= Lists of DC Comics characters =

This is a list of DC Multiverse fictional characters which were created for and are owned by DC Comics.

== Alphabetically ==
- List of DC Comics characters: 0–9
- List of DC Comics characters: A
- List of DC Comics characters: B
- List of DC Comics characters: C
- List of DC Comics characters: D
- List of DC Comics characters: E
- List of DC Comics characters: F
- List of DC Comics characters: G
- List of DC Comics characters: H
- List of DC Comics characters: I
- List of DC Comics characters: J
- List of DC Comics characters: K
- List of DC Comics characters: L
- List of DC Comics characters: M
- List of DC Comics characters: N
- List of DC Comics characters: O
- List of DC Comics characters: P
- List of DC Comics characters: Q
- List of DC Comics characters: R
- List of DC Comics characters: S
- List of DC Comics characters: T
- List of DC Comics characters: U
- List of DC Comics characters: V
- List of DC Comics characters: W
- List of DC Comics characters: X
- List of DC Comics characters: Y
- List of DC Comics characters: Z

== By type ==
- List of 100 Bullets characters
- List of Amalgam Comics characters
- List of Aquaman enemies
- List of Aquaman supporting characters
- List of Batman family enemies
- List of Batman supporting characters
- List of Black Canary characters
- List of Blue Beetle enemies
- List of The Books of Magic characters
- List of alien races in DC Comics
- Characters of the DC Extended Universe
- List of DMZ characters
- List of Doom Patrol enemies
- List of Doomsday Clock characters
- List of Fables characters
- List of Firestorm enemies
- List of Flash enemies
- List of Green Arrow supporting characters
- List of Green Arrow enemies
- List of Green Lantern enemies
- List of Green Lantern supporting characters
- List of Hawkman enemies
- List of Hellblazer characters
- List of DC Comics Hitman characters
- List of Ibis the Invincible enemies
- List of Justice League enemies
- List of Justice Society of America enemies
- List of The League of Extraordinary Gentlemen characters
- List of Legion of Super-Heroes enemies
- List of Earth-Two characters
- List of Flash supporting characters
- List of Kingdom Come (comics) characters
- List of The American Way characters
- List of metahumans in DC Comics
- List of Metal Men members
- List of Planetary characters
- List of Preacher characters
- Rogues (comics)
- List of The Sandman characters
- List of Starman characters
- List of Superman enemies
- List of Superman supporting characters
- List of Teen Titans enemies
- List of Top 10 characters
- List of Watchmen characters
- List of Wonder Woman supporting characters
- List of Wonder Woman enemies
- List of Y: The Last Man characters

== Earth-Two characters ==
Earth-Two is a fictional universe appearing in American comic book published by DC Comics. Characters who reside on Earth-Two include Superman, Batman, Wonder Woman, and various superheroes and villains and supporting characters in DC Comics.

Earth-Two (1961–1985 \ 2005–2011)	Earth-2 The New 52 (2011–present)	Notes	New Earth / Prime Earth counterpart
Kal-L / Clark Kent	Kal-El / Clark Kent Val-Zod	Superman was born on the planet Krypton, and arrived on Earth as a baby near the start of Earth's First World War. As Clark Kent, he was a reporter for the Daily Star, would become the editor-in-chief and marrying its star reporter Lois Lane. Although he was erased from existence by the events of Crisis on Infinite Earths and All-Star Squadron #60, he reappeared in Infinite Crisis and was killed by Superboy-Prime in Infinite Crisis #7. He was later resurrected as a Black Lantern, along with his wife Lois.: Following 52, another version of the character appeared, who went missing for unknown reasons for several years, leading his cousin Power Girl to search for him. With Lois Lane also missing, little is known of their adventures.; In The New 52, Kal-El is younger than the original Earth-Two version and slightly older than the mainstream Superman. His foster parents, Jonathan and Martha Kent, both survive to the present, unlike their main universe counterparts at the time. He was also married to Lois Lane but she was killed. Superman is seemingly killed alongside Batman and Wonder Woman while fighting off an Apokoliptian invasion led by Steppenwolf. A supposedly resurrected Superman later appears, having allied with Darkseid's forces. It is revealed that this version is not the actual Superman, but a Bizarro-like replica. In Earth 2: World's End, the real Superman is revived by DeSaad, who uses him as a genetic source for Kryptonian clones over the course of five years. He is eventually found and rescued by the new Wonders, who take him to safety. However, DeSaad's experimentation has left him powerless. Superman ultimately sacrifices himself to destroy the Parademon factories, saving millions of lives. Val-Zod, is a Kryptonian pacifist who refuses to fight against the forces of Darkseid occupying his Earth. Becoming the last of his House after his parents' execution by Krypton's court, Val quickly befriends fellow orphan Kara Zor-El. Moments before Krypton's destruction, he, Kara, his foster brother and another child managed to escape the planet. Through his trip, Val is educated by his parents' knowledge recorded on his capsule, convincing him to not use violence to overcome issues. After landing on Earth, he was found by Terry Sloan, who offered him asylum to "protect" him from the outside world, becoming a recluse. He was eventually found by the new Wonders. After being enlightened by Doctor Fate, Val decides to assume the Superman mantle.	Superman
Bruce Wayne	Bruce Wayne; Thomas Wayne; Dick Grayson (see Helena Wayne*)	Bruce Wayne was raised by his paternal uncle, Philip, following the murder of his parents. Along with his close friend Superman (Kal-L), Batman participated in the Justice Society and the war-time All-Star Squadron. Eventually, he retired and became the police commissioner of Gotham City. Wayne married Selina Kyle (Catwoman), and had a daughter named Helena Wayne, who became a costumed adventurer known as Huntress. In 1979, he died battling the escaped-convict Bill Jensen.: Following 52, a different version of Earth-Two Batman was introduced. This version is a founding member of the Justice Society of America who was killed by the Joker.; In the New 52, Batman is still married to Catwoman, and they have a daughter together, Helena Wayne, who became his sidekick, Robin. At some point, his wife, Selina was killed in action. Batman sacrifices himself alongside Superman and Wonder Woman against the invasion forces of Apokolips. His father, Thomas Wayne, who is revealed as being still alive, has succeeded his late son as the new Batman, using Miraclo and Venom to enhance his strength. In Convergence #3, Thomas, who has run out of his drug, is killed by various enemies of Batman from multiple timelines, while saving Dick Grayson. In Earth 2: World's End, Dick Grayson is introduced as a reporter, having never become Robin or Nightwing. His wife is Barbara Gordon, with whom he has a son, Johnny. His family flee for their lives during Darkseid's invasion and they live in a refugee camp; Barbara dies and Johnny goes missing. After finding Johnny, they line up to board an evacuation ship though they are refused under the proviso of women and children first so Richard gives his son away again to a woman, who is already inside. He then joins the battle next to Batman in one of the reacquired spaceships but they get saved by Green Lantern, who transports them off the planet. Following the events of Convergence, Dick takes the mantle of Batman after Thomas Wayne's death.	Batman
Diana Prince Trevor	Diana of Amazon Island	Princess Diana of Paradise Island, served as a member of the All-Star Squadron and soon after became secretary (later full-fledged member) of the Justice Society of America. As Diana Prince, she worked in the U.S. War Department as an assistant to intelligence officer Steve Trevor. Decades later, she and Trevor were married and had a daughter named Lyta, later known as Fury.: Following 52, another version of the character appeared, the mother of Fury, mother-in-law of Hector Hall. Diana is no longer an active member of the JSA and not a member of that group's successor Justice Society Infinity. It is unclear if she had a falling out with the group or merely retired.; In the New 52, Wonder Woman, the daughter of Hippolyta, she had taken over command of the Amazons after her mother's death. She had an affair with Steppenwolf, though she was unaware of his true intentions, which resulted in her having a daughter, Fury, with whom she has a dysfunctional relationship. Diana left Paradise Island to stop Apokoliptian invaders from abducting young Bruce Wayne and Clark Kent. Diana succeeds, but is killed by Steppenwolf.	Wonder Woman
Jay Garrick		The Flash of Earth-Two is Jay Garrick. As a college student, Garrick accidentally inhaled hard water vapors, giving him superhuman speed. Later stories had Jay inhaling heavy water instead. Jay becomes the first Justice Society member to learn of Earth-One's existence after meeting his counterpart, Barry Allen.: Following 52, another version of the character appeared, as a former member of the Justice Society of America. Like some of his Justice Society contemporaries, he has retired, though still occasionally engages in active crime-fighting.; In the New 52, a 21-year-old recent college graduate, Jay is spurned by his girlfriend, Joan Williams, and possesses very little in terms of career prospects. He receives his superhuman speed from Mercury, an Olympian god who was mortally wounded in a battle with Apokolips.	The Flash
Alan Scott		Green Lantern of Earth-Two is engineer Alan Scott. After a railroad accident, he is led from the wreck by a voice coming from a train lantern. It tells him to use part of the lantern to make a ring, and to recharge the ring by way of the lantern every 24 hours. The lantern was made from metal found in a meteor long ago. The source of Scott's power is the mystical "Starheart", the magical characteristics of the Earth-One universe gathered by the Guardians of the Universe. This collective force was hidden in the heart of a star and eventually became sentient. It helped to retard Scott's aging process. Alan subsequently met and quickly married a young woman named Alyx Florin, unaware that she was actually the schizophrenic but reformed villain Rose Canton. Alyx disappeared on their wedding night, starting a fire that led Alan to believe she had died. The two have a pair of children who would grow up and be raised separately by adoptive families as Jennifer-Lynn Hayden and Todd Rice.: Following 52, another version of the character appeared, but very little has been revealed about his specific background other than he was a formidable presence in the Justice Society of America. He is not a member of its successor group Justice Society Infinity and it is unclear if he had a falling out with the successor group or merely retired. Scott was later revealed to have died sometime ago, as stated by his daughter, Jade.; In the New 52, Alan is the young dynamic head of GBC Productions. Scott is revealed to have a boyfriend named Sam, to whom he intends to propose while on vacation in China. Before he can do so, however, the train on which the couple is travelling is suddenly wrecked. A mysterious green flame protects Scott and heals him; a disembodied voice informs him that the crash was caused by a force that threatens the whole world, and that Sam did not survive. The grief-stricken Scott is then told that he will be given the power to avenge his love and protect the world. The flame creates a costume for him, and molds Sam's engagement ring into a power ring with which Scott can harness his power. Reborn as the Green Lantern, Scott proceeds to help the other survivors and swears vengeance for Sam. Green Lantern is associated with "The Green", a mystical realm / force that connects all plant life on Earth.	Green Lantern
Kara Zor-(E)L / Karen Starr		Power Girl is the cousin of Superman. She arrived on Earth-Two late in Superman's career, and assumed the name Karen Starr as her secret identity. She took his place in the Justice Society of America after he entered into semi-retirement to focus on his personal life. After the events of Crisis on Infinite Earths and the merging of Earth-Two into New Earth, Power Girl was falsely led to believe that she was a descendant of the Atlantean sorcerer Arion.: Following 52, another version of the character appeared. At some point in time, Superman was missing and that forced Power Girl to search for her lost cousin in space. She had remained unheard for years until she returned to her Earth without any success, but to find the Power Girl of the New Earth, believing she had something to do with Superman's disappearance. Ultimately, the misunderstanding is resolved but Power Girl remained unsuccessful on what actually happened to her cousin.; In the New 52, Kara is the cousin and adopted daughter of Clark Kent and Lois Lane and the Supergirl of her world. Prior to her arrival on Earth, she was friends with Val-Zod when they were raised together on Krypton. She and Helena Wayne were flung out of their universe and into Prime Earth, during Apokolips' invasion and after her "parents"' death. Kara and Helena established new identities to blend in, but they also sought a way to return home. As Karen Starr, she used her powers quietly, working to buy or "borrow" as much advanced technology as possible to that end. She soon became a public figure, and quite wealthy. Kara decided to assume the identity of Power Girl during her superheroic exploits. The duo eventually found their way back to Earth 2, where Kara was reunited with Val-Zod.	Supergirl; Power Girl (Note: The native of Prime Earth, who becomes the new Power Girl is the Starr Industries employee Tanya Spears.)
Helena Wayne		Helena is the daughter of Bruce Wayne and Selina Kyle. As a youth, she enjoyed a thorough education, as well as being trained by her parents to become a superb athlete. After finishing school, she joined the law firm of Cranston and Grayson. In 1976, criminal Silky Cernak blackmailed Selina Kyle into resuming action once again as Catwoman, an act which eventually led to her death. Helena, deciding to bring Cernak to justice, created a costume for herself, fashioned weapons from her parents' equipment, and set out to bring him in. After accomplishing this, Helena decided to continue to fight crime as Huntress. Helena continued to fight crime as the Huntress formally joining her father's former ward Dick Grayson as his junior partner and later became a member of the revitalized Justice Society of America as well as Infinity, Inc.: Following 52, another version of the character appeared. This Helena experienced a partial mental collapse during the last case involving the Joker. Having tired of the losses to the Joker, Helena decides to kill him, but fails to do so as he ends up dying in an accident.; In The New 52 continuity, Helena Wayne fought alongside her father as Robin. During Apokolips' invasion, her father sacrificed his life, with Helena witnessing it. She was later stranded on Prime Earth along with Kara Zor-El.	Robin; Huntress (Note: One of Helena's counterparts in both New and Prime Earth, is Helena Bertinelli and in the former she is the one, who adopts the name Huntress.); Helena Kyle
Shiera Sanders Hall	Kendra Munoz-Saunders	Hawkgirl of Earth-Two was Shiera Saunders, companion of Carter Hall (Hawkman). Centuries ago, Chay-Ara and her lover Prince Khufu were killed by Hath-Set with a knife forged from Nth Metal. The properties of the metal and the strength of the duo's love created a bond between them, causing them to be continuously reincarnated. Saunders and Hall were eventually married and had a son named Hector Hall. She was also a member of the All-Star Squadron and a close associate of the Justice Society of America.: Following 52, another version of the character appeared. She is a reserve member of Justice Society Infinity.; In the New 52, Kendra Saunders is a professional treasure hunter, and was hired by the World Army before an unrevealed event occurred in Egypt that gave Kendra wings, the same time Khalid Ben-Hassin found the Helmet of Fate.	Hawkgirl / Hawkwoman (Note: Prior to the New 52, this current Earth-2 character was a native of New Earth.)
Kent Nelson	Khalid Ben-Hassin	Doctor Fate was Kent Nelson, who was orphaned as a child after his archaeologist father was killed for opening the tomb of the wizard Nabu. The wizard raised Nelson and taught him the ways of magic, eventually giving him a mystical amulet and the Helmet of Fate, which contained Nabu's essence. Whenever Nelson wore the helmet, his personality melded with that of Nabu. Fate's first encounter with a hero of that era was the Spectre, the wrath of God.: Following 52, another version of the character appeared. He was a member of the Justice Society of America, searching for two of his missing allies, Superman and Power Girl.; In the New 52, the current Doctor Fate is Khalid Ben-Hassin. He is an associate of Kendra Saunders who discovers the Helmet of Nabu in a tomb in Egypt, but is reluctant to use its power due to the increasing presence of Nabu's spirit affecting his thoughts and sanity. After Superman mercilessly attacks him, Khalid becomes traumatized and psychologically damaged by the ordeal. Fate has since joined the rest of his Earth's heroes to battle the forces of Apokolips.	Doctor Fate (Note: In the New 52, the Doctor Fate of Prime Earth is a combination of both the aforementioned characters, named Khalid "Kent" Nassour (Nelson).)
Aquaman	Marella / Aquawoman	Aquaman was given superhuman strength and the ability to live underwater and communicate with marine life by his scientist father. He briefly joined the All-Star Squadron, but preferred to work alone. He was retconned out of existence by the events of Crisis on Infinite Earths and All-Star Squadron #60. In the New 52, the rightful ruler of Atlantis is Queen Marella, who becomes an ally of the Wonders of the World after Batman frees her from the Arkham Command Center. She assists Batman and the other heroes in locating the Kryptonian Val-Zod before returning to Atlantis but vowed to help when called. During Apokolips' second invasion, Marella joins the fight against Darkseid and frees Azathoth, the avatar of the Blue, from underneath Atlantis.	Aquaman
Abigail Mathilda "Ma" Hunkel	Lois Lane	The original Red Tornado of Earth-Two is Ma Hunkel, a widow and the head of a Manhattan grocery store. A parody of the typical superhero, her costume consisted of longjohns and a cooking pot worn on her head. Although a costume mishap prevented her from attending the first meeting of the Justice Society of America, Hunkel is eventually inducted as an honorary member. In the New 52, Red Tornado was an android which grew out of the World Army's "Red Files" initiative. In the spirit of other heroes, this android was built but never successfully activated. The robot was requisitioned by Terry Sloan and implanted with the mind of Lois Lane, who was killed during the first Apokoliptian invasion.	Red Tornado
Terry Sloane		Terry Sloane is a rich man whose photographic memory, Olympic-level athletic skills, and mastery of the martial arts made him a virtual Renaissance man. After graduating college at age thirteen, he eventually became a renowned business leader. Having accomplished all of his goals by his early 20s, Sloane felt that he had nothing left and intended to committ suicide. However, upon seeing a young woman jump from a bridge, Sloane reacted quickly and saved her. He learned her name was Wanda Wilson. Sloane assisted her brother, who had been caught up in a gang, as Mister Terrific. In the New 52, Terry Sloan is a government research scientist who serves on the front line of the war against Apokolips, using the identity Mister 08. While researching methods of counter-attack, Sloan receives visions of the future. Acting to prevent these visions during his final mission, he detonates an alien device, destroying four nations.	Mister Terrific
Al Pratt		Al Pratt is a college student turned physicist who had no superpowers for much of his career. Through intense training, he achieved peak physical condition and became a fierce brawler. Among Golden Age members of the Justice Society, only Wildcat and Batman are considered more formidable in hand-to-hand combat.: Following 52, another version of the character appeared. He was a member of the Justice Society of America and remained active after the team became Justice Society Infinity, alongside his godson Nuklon.; In the New 52, Al Pratt is a U.S. Sergeant in charge of a squad carrying an atomic bomb meant to neutralize an Apokoliptian tower responsible for transporting Parademons to Earth. His squad is attacked while en route to the tower, resulting in the bomb being detonated. Pratt is later found to have survived the explosion. Five years later, Pratt has become a captain in the World Army and is operating as the Atom. After being mortally wounded by a clone of Superman, Pratt is placed in an induced coma. He is later awakened to perform one last mission. Pratt sacrifices himself to create a cavern serving as a refuge, which is named Atom's Haven in his honor.	The Atom
Wesley Dodds		The Sandman is a member of the Justice Society who wields a sleeping gas gun. Originally the character had no superpowers; he was retroactively given the ability to see the future via his dreams. In the New 52, Dodds works for the World Army. In Washington DC is attacked by Solomon Grundy, Commander Wesley Dodds, along with his Sandmen paramilitary force, is sent to retrieve and save President Lightfoot. The group later comes into conflict with Green Lantern, Flash, and Doctor Fate, who are also attacking Dherain. Just as the two groups are about to reach an agreement, they are attacked by the Hunger Dogs. Most of the Sandmen are killed in the ensuing battle, with Dodds and one other member surviving.	Sandman
Henry Heywood / Commander Steel	Henry Heywood Jr. / Captain Steel	Hank Haywood enlisted in the U.S. Marine Corps prior to their involvement in WW II, but was injured when saboteurs attacked his base. As a biology student under the tutelage of Gilbert Giles, his former professor performed extensive surgery on him with mechanized steel devices that facilitate normal human functions on a superhuman level. He adopted the persona "Commander Steel", and started fighting saboteurs before being sent to Europe on secret missions. Heywood later became a member of the All-Star Squadron. In The New 52, Henry Heywood Jr. was born in the Philippines and had a rare disorder that degraded his bones. Heywood's father reinforces his bones with a metal alloy, giving him superhuman strength. After he is attacked by Parademons, Heywood Sr. destroys his documents and kills himself rather than have the Parademons steal his work. After the end of the Apokolips War, Heywood Jr. joins the World Army as Captain Steel.	Commander / Citizen Steel
Oliver Queen	Connor Hawke / Red Arrow; Oliver Queen / Red Arrow	Oliver Queen was born to an average family in the western United States during or soon after World War I. Living alongside Native Americans on reservation land, Queen began a lifelong appreciation of the tribal lifestyle of the native Indians, becoming an Indian historian and even developing a proficiency with archery. While seeking to recover his relic collection from thieves, he took up his bow for the first time against evil doers. Deciding to continue on, Queen became the master archer known as the "Green Arrow" for the rest of his life. His large collection of artifacts and relics of the Native Americans, which he would lend out to various museums, afforded him a large personal fortune. Green Arrow later became a member of the All-Star Squadron and the Seven Soldiers of Victory. The character was killed during Crisis on Infinite Earths. In the New 52, Connor Hawke is an operative of the World Army under the codename Red Arrow. Hawke is later killed by monsters unleashed by the invading forces of Apokolips. In Earth 2: Worlds End, Oliver Queen, who is the new Red Arrow, is revealed by Thomas and Helena Wayne to be protecting Bruce Wayne's secret files which contain information on all of Earth 2's history, culture, and life, a back-up plan should the world ever become doomed.	Green Arrow (Note: Prior to the New 52, Connor Hawke was a native of New Earth, where he was the second Green Arrow. In New Earth, Red Arrow was an alias of Roy Harper.)
James "Jimmy" Olsen	James "Jimmy" Olsen / Accountable / Doctor Impossible	James Olsen is a junior reporter at the Daily Star who is taught by Clark Kent and Lois Lane. Jimmy becomes close friends with Clark and ultimately becomes the managing editor of the Daily Star. In the New 52, Jimmy Olsen is a hacktivist known as Accountable. As Accountable, Jimmy is able to interact with and manipulate electronic data, making him a powerful asset in the war against Darkseid. Over the war, he shows a stunning affinity for interacting with the Apokoliptian Mother Box as well, which actually bonds with him. Before the Mother Box leaves his body, it calls Jimmy part of the Source and after that, Olsen is left a changed man, implying that he became a New God. In Earth 2: Society, upon arriving on the New Earth 2, Jimmy reveals himself in a new costume and refers to himself as Doctor Impossible.	Jimmy Olsen (Note: Prior to the New 52, Doctor Impossible was an unnamed New God from Apokolips and the presumed brother of Mister Miracle, not related with either Earth 2 or Olsen.)
Hippolyta "Lyta" Trevor	Donna of Amazon Island	The daughter of Wonder Woman and Steve Trevor; as a result of this lineage, Lyta had all her mother's powers. Lyta later adopted the identity of Fury, named after the Furies of mythology, and was one of the founding members of Infinity Inc. She also began a relationship with her teammate Hector Hall, the Silver Scarab, who she had met as a child. Shortly after their decision to marry, Hector was possessed by an enemy of his father, Hawkman, and killed. It turned out that Fury was pregnant with Hector's child, and it was instrumental in the Silver Scarab's defeat. In post-Crisis continuity, Lyta is the daughter of Helena Kosmatos rather than Wonder Woman.: Following 52, another version of the character appeared, as a member of Justice Society Infinity and once again, Diana's daughter.; In the New 52, Donna is the daughter of the late Wonder Woman and Steppenwolf of Apokolips. She is the last Amazon, as the other Amazons were killed five years earlier during the Apokoliptian invasion of Earth 2. Donna is introduced as working with Steppenwolf, but is later revealed to have been brainwashed by him. She later joins the rest of the heroes against Apokolips' forces.	Fury; Donna Troy
Cyrus Gold	Solomon Grundy	In the late 19th century, a wealthy merchant named Cyrus Gold is murdered and his body disposed of in Slaughter Swamp, near Gotham City. Fifty years later, the corpse is reanimated as a huge shambling figure with almost no memory of its past life. He shows up in a hobo camp and, when asked about his name, one of the few things he can recall is that he was "born on a Monday". One of the men at the camp mentions the nursery rhyme character Solomon Grundy (who was born on a Monday), and Gold adopts the moniker. Solomon Grundy falls into a life of crime—or, perhaps returns to one as his scattered residual memories may indicate—attracting the attention of the Green Lantern, Alan Scott. In the New 52, Grundy is the avatar of the Grey, a cosmic force connecting all fungal life. He is the opposite of the Green, represented by Alan Scott. Grundy was originally a slaughterhouse worker in 1898 whose wife was raped by his callous foreman and ended up killing herself on the job. When the foreman made the workers feed the body to the crocodiles, Grundy snapped, killed his foreman and everyone else in the slaughterhouse, then committed suicide.	
Yolanda Montez / Wildcat	Yolanda Montez	Yolanda Montez's mother was experimented on by an insane scientist while pregnant, but unlike his other test subjects, he lost track of them when they moved from Mexico to the US. Yolanda eventually developed super powers which gave her feline characteristics. When her god father, Ted Grant, the original Wildcat was injured, she decided to succeed him, joining Infinity, Inc soon afterward. Yolanda remained with Infinity Inc. until the team disbanded, but she was later killed by Eclipso.: Following 52, another version of the character appeared, who is an active member of Justice Society Infinity.; In the New 52, Yolanda is a Mexican student and the avatar of the Red, a cosmic force connecting all animal life. The Red initially chose Yolanda's cousin Alejandro as an avatar, but she volunteered to take his place. Yolanda is later captured by DeSaad, but is freed and gives up her powers to empower Alan Scott. While stranded on the planet Telos in Convergence, Yolanda discovers she has residual animal-like senses, claws, and reflexes from her time as avatar of the Red.	Wildcat
Selina Kyle-Wayne		Selina Kyle was originally a criminal in Gotham City, and was initially one of the primary foes of Batman and Robin. Selina reformed in the 1950s (after the events of Batman #69) and married Bruce Wayne. Soon afterwards, the couple gave birth to their only child, Helena Wayne. In 1976, Selina is killed after being blackmailed by a criminal into going into action again as Catwoman. In the New 52, Selina Kyle and Bruce Wayne are married, and their daughter, Helena Wayne, is that universe's Robin. Selina was the one who supported Helena into becoming Robin, as Bruce was opposed to that, not wanting his daughter to risk her life, fighting crime. On the present day, Selina acts as a superhero but it is unknown if she has reformed or was never a supervillain in the first place. It is revealed, in Worlds' Finest #0, that Selina was killed while trying to stop what she believed was a human trafficking ring.	Catwoman
Lois Lane-Kent	(see Red Tornado*)	Lois was an aggressive, career-minded reporter for the Daily Star. She began dating her colleague, Clark Kent, with whom she had an antagonistic relationship at first, and they later get married. Lois finds out on their honeymoon that Clark is Superman, after she tried to cut his hair as he slept. When Kent succeeded Tom Taylor as Editor-in-Chief of the Daily Star, Lois became its lead investigative reporter. During Crisis on Infinite Earths, Lois accompanies Superman, Superboy-Prime, and Alexander Luthor Jr. in leaving to another dimension, as their home universes had been destroyed. Ultimately dying from a mysterious illness, she was taken from that artificial Earth and buried alongside her husband on New Earth.	Lois Lane
Dick Grayson / Robin	(see Batman*)	Dick Grayson was born in the late 1920s, and continued to be Robin even as an adult, having no successors even after Batman's death. His allies included the All-Star Squadron along with Batwoman and Bat-Girl. He eventually became a member of the Justice Society of America. During his later years, he adopted a more Batman-like look for a time, and by the 1960s had become a lawyer, the full partner in the law firm of Cranston and Grayson, and the ambassador to South Africa. On many occasions Grayson performed as the senior partner of the new "Dynamic Duo" which consisted of himself and Helena Wayne. Robin was killed during the events of Crisis on Infinite Earths.: Following 52, another version of the character appeared, as Batman's junior partner and eventual successor. Grayson kept himself at a distance from Wayne's daughter, though he is openly attached to her in a romantic manner. Grayson does not know that she also returns his affections.	Robin; Dick Grayson
Roy Harper	(see Red Arrow*)	Roy Harper was an orphan who became the ward of Oliver Queen, the Green Arrow. As Speedy, he was the Green Arrow's partner and a member of both the All-Star Squadron and the Seven Soldiers of Victory. He was retconned out of existence by the events of Crisis on Infinite Earths and All-Star Squadron #60.	Speedy
Jonathan L. Thunder; Jonni Thunder	Jonni Thunder	As an infant, the blond-haired Johnny Thunder is given possession of the pink, lightning-haired genie-like "Thunderbolt" named Yz during a mystic ritual on his 7th birthday, which was intended to allow the Badhnesians to use Johnny to rule the world. However, the plan is soon aborted after an attack from a neighboring country and Johnny returned to the United States. Jonni Thunder and her father, Jim Thunder, started the "J. Thunder Detective Agency" in Los Angeles, California. After her father's death, Jonni learned about the story of a statue her he possessed, which was found in a South American country and given to Jim by a man he himself had put in jail. She eventually retrieved the statue from a repair shop where it had ended up. Jonni inadvertently released the energy of the statue, freeing the creature called Thunderbolt. Jonni apparently had mental control over Thunderbolt, though she was rendered unconscious when it was active. In the New 52, Jonni Thunder was one of the prisoners at Arkham Base. They were all released by John Constantine of Prime Earth, in order to help him return to his Earth.	J.J. Thunder
Todd Rice / Obsidian		Todd James Rice is the biological son of Alan Scott and the villain known as Thorn. Todd was raised in an abusive adoptive home in Milwaukee, Wisconsin. He found out in his late teens that he had a twin sister, Jennie-Lynn Hayden. They met, discovered they both had superpowers and, operating under the assumption that Green Lantern was their father, decided to follow in his footsteps. Jade and Obsidian became founding members of the hero group Infinity, Inc, which comprised those who continued the legacy of the JSA. Todd later meets and falls in love with Damon Matthews, an assistant district attorney.: Following 52, another version of the character appeared. He is a member of the Justice Society of America and that he is searching for two of his missing allies, Superman and Power Girl.; In the New 52, Todd Rice was one of the prisoners at Arkham Base. They were all released by John Constantine of Prime Earth, in order to help him return to his Earth. This version is depicted as an African-American and is not related to Alan Scott. Obsidian is later killed during Apokolips' second invasion.	
Henry King, Sr. / Brain Wave; Henry King, Jr. / Brainwave	Henry King, Jr.	Henry King, Sr. was a super-villain who used his psionic powers to fight the Justice Society of America. He was married to Merry Pemberton, and they had a child who would become his heroic successor. King was a member of the Injustice Society and later of the Secret Society of Super Villains. Henry King Sr. ultimately died protecting his son, transferring his mental powers to him. Henry King Jr. became a superhero in some measure to atone for his father's past deeds. He later joined the group called Infinity, Inc., which was formed by his uncle Sylvester Pemberton. In the New 52, Henry King, Jr. was one of the prisoners at Arkham Base. They were all released by John Constantine of Prime Earth, in order to help him return to his Earth.: In Earth 2 Annual #1, a duo of characters, a father and son named Henri Roy, Sr. and Jr. appeared, as a presumed revamped and renamed version of Brainwave. Sr. is a weapons dealer of illegal hardware from Apokolips. He is defeated by the combined efforts of Atom and Batman as well as his son Henri Jr., who works with the World Army.	
Ted Grant		Ted Grant is a heavyweight boxer who becomes tangled in his sinister managers' plans, and was arrested for a murder he did not commit. He became a fugitive, taking the name of Wildcat and vowing to clear his name. After clearing his name, Wildcat continued to fight against crime. He became a member of the Justice Society of America and the All-Star Squadron. In the New 52, Ted Grant appears as a boxer living in the same in the World Army refugee camp as Dick and Barbara Grayson during Darkseid's second invasion of Earth. After Barbara's death, Ted trains Dick in fighting techniques and self-defense, and joins him on a mission to recover his lost son.	Wildcat
Robert Crane		Dr. Robert Crane worked for years on perfecting a mechanical body that could sustain a human brain after the human body was unable to continue supporting the brain. Criminals found out about Crane's experiment thinking that it could provide a form of immortality, so they tried to steal it and force Crane to tell them how to operate it. Crane refused and attempted to escape but the gangsters shot and left him to die. Crane's partner decided to transplant Crane's brain into the robot body, in order to save him. Crane became Robotman and let the world believe that he was dead, adopting a new alias. He was a member of the All-Star Squadron during World War II. In the New 52, Robert Crane is one of the scientists working on the Red Tornado project for the World Army. Crane is apparently killed during a cave-in at the World Army Arkham Base and has his brain transferred to a robotic body created by Terry Sloan.	Robotman
Lee Travis		A wealthy newsman, Lee Travis was the Crimson Avenger. He and his sidekick Wing were both members of the All-Star Squadron and the Seven Soldiers of Victory. Wing sacrificed his life to defeat Nebula Man, while Crimson Avenger later died piloting a ship away from the docks before it could explode. In the New 52, Lee Travis is a female African-American reporter who works for the Global Broadcasting Corporation.	Crimson Avenger
James "Jim" Lockhart		Jim Lockhart is a engineer and member of the U.S. Navy who built a one-man submarine called the Red Torpedo. He uses his sub to combat lawlessness at sea and fight against the Nazis and Japanese forces during World War II. Lockhart later becomes one of the first members of the Freedom Fighters. In the New 52, Jim Lockhart is an inventor who is hired by the World Army to build a flame-resistant submarine.	Red Torpedo
Dinah Drake Lance	N/A	Dinah Drake would become the Black Canary, a costumed vigilante that at first posed as a criminal in order to break up gangs. This would bring her into conflict with Johnny Thunder and Thunderbolt, who developed an unrequited romantic interest in Black Canary. Dinah would soon abandon her posing as a criminal and would later become a crime fighter. One of the few female members of the Justice Society's World War II roster, she would later marry her detective friend Larry Lance. After her husband's death, she was mistakenly believed to have migrated to Earth-One. It is later revealed that Drake died from radiation poisoning, and that the Black Canary who journeyed to Earth-One was her daughter.	Black Canary
Jim Harper	N/A	Jim Harper was a rookie cop in the Metropolis Police Department, walking his beat in Suicide Slum, and the street-level vigilante, the Guardian. He was also the uncle of Roy Harper, who was better known as Green Arrow's teen sidekick, Speedy. During World War II, he became a member of the All-Star Squadron, though mostly as a reserve.	Guardian
Molly Mayne; Marcie Cooper	N/A	Molly Mayne was a former criminal, known as Harlequin. Mayne developed a crush on Scott and, donning a colorful costume, started a life of crime to attract his attention. In 1948, Mayne betrayed her Injustice Society teammates to save the lives of the Justice Society. A subsequent deal with the U.S. government allowed her to work as an undercover agent for the FBI in return for amnesty for her past crimes. Years later, Alan Scott realized that he had loved Molly all this time and they were married. Marcie Cooper is the granddaughter of Dan Richards, the original Manhunter. As a teenager, she is recruited to join the Manhunters, the alien organization which was secretly attempting to dominate the Earth. Appealing to Cooper's greed, the Manhunters get her a job working alongside Molly Mayne at KGLX radio, a position she uses to infiltrate Infinity, Inc.	Harlequin
Carter Hall	N/A	Hawkman of Earth-Two is the archaeologist Carter Hall, companion of Shiera Saunders (Hawkgirl). Centuries ago, Chay-Ara and her lover Prince Khufu were killed by Hath-Set with a knife forged from Nth Metal. The properties of the metal and the strength of the duo's love created a bond between them, causing them to be reborn multiple times throughout the centuries. Hall an Saunders were eventually married and had a son named Hector Hall. He was also a member of the All-Star Squadron and a close associate of the Justice Society of America.: Following 52, another version of the character appeared. He is a member of the Justice Society of America and a reserve member of Justice Society Infinity.	Hawkman
Johnny Chambers / Johnny Quick	N/A	Johnny Quick was a newsreel photographer who mastered the power of superspeed by reciting a mathematical formula: "3X2(9YZ)4A". Inspired by the Flash, Chambers created a costume for himself and began calling himself "Johnny Quick" in imitation of his hero. During World War II, he was drafted into service as a member of the All-Star Squadron. After the war, Quick would resume his mostly solo actions and joined the reconstituted Justice Society before it was officially disbanded. While the formula did indeed increase Chambers' speed to vastly superhuman levels, Chambers's top speed is far below that of the Flash.	Johnny Quick
Dan Richards; Paul Kirk II	N/A	Donald "Dan" Richards attended the police academy with his girlfriend's brother, Jim, who was at the top of the class, while Dan was at the very bottom. After Jim was framed for a crime he did not commit, Dan took up the identity of Manhunter to track down the actual killer. Richards later joins the Freedom Fighters. Paul Kirk is a former big-game hunter who took on the mantle of Manhunter. Following his death, he was resurrected through cloning by a mysterious group called the Council, who he came to oppose. At some point, Kirk joined the All-Star Squadron.: Another character named Paul Kirk, also a native of Earth 2, existed before the one mentioned above. He is a private detective who operated during the 1940s. This character starred in a feature called Paul Kirk, Manhunter.	Manhunter
Patrick "Eel" O'Brian	N/A	In 1941, petty crook "Eel" O'Brian was shot during a botched robbery attempt and his wound contaminated by unknown chemicals which altered his body chemistry, giving him the ability to change shape. Nursed back to health by an order of monks, and now truly repentant, O'Brian embarked on a new career as the crime busting Plastic Man, soon joining the FBI and later becoming their official liaison with the newly formed All-Star Squadron during World War II. In late 1942 however, Eel migrated to Earth-X along with numerous other heroes who became collectively known as the Freedom Fighters. He was retconned out of existence by the events of Crisis on Infinite Earths and All-Star Squadron #60.	Plastic Man
Giovanni "John" Zatara	N/A	John Zatara is an illusionist and a descendant of the Homo Magi, who used his powers to fight crime and evil. Zatara possesses a variety of magical abilities, which are primarily activated through speaking backwards. Zatara is also a member of the All-Star Squadron.	
N/A	Sonia Sato	Commander Sonia Sato (formerly Major) is a member of the World Army, who worked to apprehend the new Wonders of the World as they started to emerge prior to the second Apokolips invasion. When the invasion took place, Sonia ended up working alongside the Wonders to help protect the Earth. She succeeded Amar Khan as Commander after his death.	Judomaster
N/A	Jason "Stormy" Foster	Jason Foster was a member of the World Army. He along with Commander Khan planned their attack on Steppenwolf, and he announced his intention to bring the criminal before the Courts of the Free World for his crimes. Foster is later killed during a battle by Apokolips' forces, during the second invasion.	
N/A	Barbara Grayson	Barbara is a police officer in Chicago Police Department, and married with a journalist, Richard "Dick" Grayson. Together they have a son, Johnny Grayson. Their family flee for their lives during Darkseid's second invasion and live in a World Army refugee camp. The family found an ally in a fellow refugee, Ted Grant, who decides to protect them during a riot. After a meteor hits the camp, Barbara gets covered in rubble but a woman helps her and later leads the family into another "safe" camp. The safe place turns out to be the old Navy Pier, now turned into a crude stockade, Gomorrah. There the people of Gomorrah imprison Barbara because she is a cop, separating her from her family. Dick is able to free Barbara and together they escape and go to search for their missing son. Barbara tries to board a train out of Chicago, but is shot dead by one of the people in the crowd.	Barbara Gordon
N/A	Sam Zhao	Sam Zhao was Alan Scott's fiancée. About five years after the first Apokoliptian invasion of Earth, Alan was about to propose to Sam when the train they were on was derailed by an explosion, killing Sam and injuring Alan. After his death, Zhao became the avatar of the White, a cosmic force representing air.	
N/A	Azathoth	Azathoth is a Cthulhu-like sea monster that sleeps near Atlantis. It became the Avatar of the Blue, the elemental force of water, when it helped to save Atlantis. He was later killed by Deathspawn and donated his spirit to Alan Scott.	
N/A	Karel Wotan	An ancient sorcerer who started life as a female Viking and later mastered the arts of sorcery having lived several lifetimes with altered genders. She came to Egypt and tried to take the power of Nabu, the wizard of Fate, but he defeated her. Realizing that she would strike at him and his successors, he marked her, giving her pale skin, and immediately killed her. Over the centuries, Wotan reincarnated in both male and female bodies up to the present day.	Wotan
N/A	Jaime Encana	Jaime Encana was a regular human until he was empowered by Kanto. After the Apokolips war ended, Encana became the criminal Mister Icicle, using a special suit that enables him to perform ice attacks. Icicle is later killed by Batman, who was searching for Kanto.	Icicle / Mr. Freeze
N/A	Jeremy Karn / Karnevil	Karn is an immoral sadist and racist who was imprisoned at Arkham Base. He, Obsidian and Jonni Thunder are released by John Constantine (Prime Earth) in order to help him return to his Earth. Karn refuses to work with Obsidian, who is black. For his bigotry and unwillingness, Karn is fatally shot by Constantine.	Kid Karnevil
N/A	Amar Khan	Khan is the Commander of a segment of the World Army dedicated to dealing with the Wonders of the World, the first line of defense after the Apokolips invasion. During the second invasion, Khan is killed in an explosion caused by Darkseid's Omega-Beams.	
N/A	John Constantine	Constantine is a Liverpool native who spent his youth in a rock band alongside his lifelong friends. Eventually, he settled down, marrying Maureen and retired to Liverpool. On his 30th birthday, Constantine and his friends decide to brave through the Apokoliptian invasion at a local pub. During their celebration, Constantine encounters his main universe counterpart, who instructs him in the use of magic. Constantine decides to sacrifice himself during a ritual, performed by the Prime Earth version, so his loved ones could live.	John Constantine
N/A	Tempest	In Teen Titans: Futures End, which takes place in an alternate timeline five years in the future, an unnamed Atlantean refugee from Earth 2, joins a new iteration of the Teen Titans in Prime Earth.	Tempest; Lagoon Boy
N/A	Klarion	In Teen Titans: Futures End, which takes place in an alternate timeline five years in the future, Klarion joins a new iteration of the Teen Titans.	Klarion the Witch Boy
N/A	Kid Flash	In Teen Titans: Futures End, which takes place in an alternate timeline five years in the future, an unnamed refugee from Earth 2 takes the mantle of Kid Flash and joins a new iteration of the Teen Titans.	Kid Flash
N/A	Johnny Sorrow	On the new Earth 2's city of New Gotham, Johnny Sorrow and his gang hunt down Terry Sloan for his crimes against society. Sorrow captures Sloan, but Batman, who is also after Sloan, later intervenes and attempts to arrest him himself. Sorrow says that Sloan belongs to creatures much darker than Batman, but he after taking out his henchmen attempts to go against Sorrow, telling him to walk away. Sorrow attempts to harm Batman by removing his mask, showing him his face, but Batman subdues him by using his cape as a reflective surface, showing Sorrow his own reflection.	Johnny Sorrow
N/A	Anarky	Prior to the series, a female version of Anarky detonated a bomb in Neotropolis that resulted in a riot. She disappeared before Superman and Power Girl could apprehend her. In present day, she appears as a hacker who is allied with Doctor Impossible, Hourman, and Johnny Sorrow.	Anarky
Rex Tyler; Rick Tyler	Rick Tyler	A chemist who discovered the miraculous chemical Miraclo, Rex Tyler became the super-hero Hourman, able to use extraordinary abilities for an hour at a time. He became a valued member of the Justice Society and the All-Star Squadron. The diminished use and refinement led Rex to abandon his Hourman identity in 1943. Rick Tyler is Rex's son and successor, the second Hourman. He took over the Hourman mantle, using his father's Miraclo pills to save people from a fire at a hospital. After serving for a few years as a member of Infinity, Inc., a team largely consisting of the children of JSA members, Rick began to grow addicted to Miraclo just as his father did. After overcoming his addiction, Rick goes on to join the JSA. In the New 52, Rick Tyler a.k.a. Hourman appears as a villain and works alongside Jimmy Olsen, Johnny Sorrow, and Anarky. Three months prior to the series, Rick broke into WayneCorp to retrieve Thomas Wayne's Miraclo supplies. Rick is motivated by revenge and views Thomas Wayne as a thief that stole the only thing that could have saved his family.	Hourman
Mist	Kyle Nimbus	A brilliant scientist, he invented a chemical to render people and objects invisible. He attempted to sell his invention to the United States Government during World War I, but he was not believed. He swore revenge by assisting the Axis powers during World War II by sending invisible agents to steal America's military secrets. Mist was the archenemy of Starman and his power allows him to transform into living gas. Kyle Nimbus is the owner of Nimbus Solutions in New Gotham. His company has created a product, the Nimbus Fusion Cell, that even though provides power it is also carcinogenic, as it is derived from toxic waste from the arch ship engines. Nimbus is also associated with the rising of crime in the city, with his enforces running the black market.	Mist
