= Insect Queen =

Insect Queen refers to comic book characters from two different publishers

- Insect Queen (DC Comics), two versions of the character from DC Comics
- Insect Queen (Marvel Comics), a version of the character from Marvel Comics
- Insect Queen (Amalgam Comics), a version of the character from Amalgam Comics
