= List of DC Comics characters: 0–9 =

== 3G4 ==
3G4 is a villain in the DC Universe. He solely appears in Aquaman vol. 5 #37 (October 1997) and was created by Peter David and Jim Calafiore.

3G4 is a Parademon who befriends Aquaman after crash-landing on Earth and gains sentience, defying his species' typical mindless behavior. When 3G4's drill instructor Topkick attacks Aquaman, 3G4 sacrifices himself to save him.

== 4-D ==
4-D first appears in JLA #24 (December 1998) as part of the International Ultramarine Corps.

== 500Z-Q ==
500Z-Q, also known as Soozie-Q, first appears in Hero Hotline #1 (April 1989) as part of the Hero Hotline team.

== 666 ==
666 is a character originating from the series Kingdom Come, created by Mark Waid and Alex Ross. He is a metahuman cyborg and one of several metahumans who were imprisoned by Superman. 666 is killed when Captain Marvel detonates a bomb that the Blackhawk squadron intended to use to kill metahumans.

== 8-Ball ==
8-Ball is a character appearing in 100 Bullets, published by Vertigo. He first appeared in 100 Bullets #29 (October 2001) and was created by Brian Azzarello and Eduardo Risso.
