= List of Amalgam Comics characters =

The following is a list of fictional characters who either fully appear, or are only briefly mentioned, in the 24 one-shots of Amalgam Comics. They are listed by comic book title and a teams section is also provided. Either the amalgamations of characters or the Amalgam versions of one character are given. Plots of the Amalgam comic books are given in the list of Amalgam Comics publications and additional information about characters is provided in the references.

== Original event (February – May 1996) ==
DC versus Marvel Comics / Marvel Comics versus DC #1–4 (February – May 1996) was a joint publication by DC Comics and Marvel Comics and the main event of the intercompany crossovers. DC published issues #1 and 4 and Marvel published issues #2 and 3.

=== First appearances ===
==== DC versus Marvel Comics #1 (February 1996) ====
- The Brothers. Two cosmic beings who personified both the Post-Crisis DC Universe of New Earth and the mainstream Marvel Universe of Earth-616, respectively (the one that personified the first universe was red in color and the one who personified the second universe was blue in color; when the Amalgam Universe was created, they were amalgamated themselves into one cosmic being that was a combination of both colors).
- Access (Axel Asher). A man who was a native of the mainstream Marvel Universe of Earth-616, but was then given the power to travel between both it and the Post-Crisis DC Universe of New Earth.

==== Marvel Comics versus DC #3 (April 1996) ====
- Super-Soldier (Clark Kent). An amalgamation (or combination) of DC's Superman (Kal-El a.k.a. Clark Kent) and Marvel's Captain America (Steve Rogers).
- The Dark Claw (Logan Wayne). An amalgamation of DC's Batman (Bruce Wayne) and Marvel's Wolverine (James Howlett a.k.a. "Logan").
- Deadeye (Bill Lawton). An amalgamation of DC's Deadshot (Floyd Lawton) and Marvel's Bullseye (Lester (last name unknown)).
- Doctor Doomsday (Victor von Doom). An amalgamation of DC's Doomsday and Marvel's Doctor Doom (Victor von Doom).
- Doctor Strangefate (Charles Xavier). An amalgamation of DC's Doctor Fate (Kent Nelson) and Marvel's Doctor Strange (Stephen Strange) and Professor X (Charles Xavier).
- Lethal (Sergei Minerva). An amalgamation of DC's the Cheetah (Barbara Ann Minerva) and Marvel's Kraven the Hunter (Sergei Kravinoff).
- The Nightcreeper (Kurt "Jack" Ryder). An amalgamation of DC's the Creeper (Jack Ryder) and Marvel's Nightcrawler (Kurt Wagner).
- The Skulk (Bruce Banner). An amalgamation of DC's Solomon Grundy (Cyrus Gold) and Marvel's the Hulk (Robert Bruce Banner).
- Spider-Boy (Peter Ross). An amalgamation of DC's Superboy (Kon-El a.k.a. Conner Kent) and Marvel's Spider-Man (Peter Parker).

== Subsequent events ==
=== First appearances or first mentions ===
==== DC/Marvel: All Access #4 (December 1996) ====
- Mutant Man (Lucas Kent). An amalgamation of DC's Superman (Kal-El a.k.a. Clark Kent) and Marvel's Bishop (full name: Lucas Bishop).
- The Martian Phoenix (J'ean J'onzz). An amalgamation of DC's the Martian Manhunter (J'onn J'onzz a.k.a. John Jones) and Marvel's Phoenix (Jean Grey).
- Green Cyclops (Kyle Summers). An amalgamation of DC's Green Lantern (Kyle Rayner) and Marvel's Cyclops (Scott Summers).
- The Dark Light (Jubilation Wayne). An amalgamation of DC's Batman (Bruce Wayne) and Marvel's Jubilee (Jubilation Lee).
- Flash Bang (Wally Guthrie). An amalgamation of DC's the Flash (Wally West) and Marvel's Cannonball (Sam Guthrie).
- King Ice (Arthur Drake). An amalgamation of DC's Aquaman (Orin a.k.a. Arthur Curry) and Marvel's the Iceman (Bobby Drake).

==== Unlimited Access #4 (January 1998) ====
- Dark Access. An evil version of Access from a possible alternate future who is under the control of Darkseid.
- Thor-El. An amalgamation of DC's Superman (Kal-El a.k.a. Clark Kent) and Marvel's Thor (full name: Thor Odinson).
  - The Valhalla Zone. An amalgamation of DC's the Phantom Zone and Marvel's version of Valhalla from Norse mythology (this place is briefly mentioned by Thor-El).
- Green Goliath (Hank Jordan). An amalgamation of DC's Green Lantern (Hal Jordan) and Goliath (Hank Pym).
- Jean Black. An amalgamation of DC's the Black Canary (Dinah Laurel Lance) and Marvel's Marvel Girl (Jean Grey).
- Captain America Jr. (Freddy Rodgers). An amalgamation of DC's Captain Marvel Jr. (Freddy Freedman) and Marvel's Captain America (Steve Rogers).
- Quick Freeze (Bobby Allen). An amalgamation of DC's Impulse (Bart Allen) and Marvel's the Iceman (Bobby Drake).
- Redwing the Avenging Wonder (Warren Drake). An amalgamation of DC's Robin (Tim Drake) and Marvel's the Angel (Warren Worthington III).
- Wonder Wasp (Cassie van Dyne). An amalgamation of DC's Wonder Girl (Cassandra Sandsmark) and Marvel's the Wasp (Janet van Dyne).
- Bat-X (real name unknown). An amalgamation of DC's Batman (Bruce Wayne) and Marvel's Professor X (Charlies Xavier).
- Saberbak. An amalgamation of DC's Kalibak and Marvel's Sabretooth (Victor Creed).
- The Red Lash. An amalgamation of DC's Lashina and Marvel's the Scarlet Witch (Wanda Maximoff).
- Kantique. An amalgamation of DC's Kanto and Marvel's Mystique (Raven Darkhölme).
- Blobba. An amalgamation of DC's Stompa and Marvel's the Blob (Fred Dukes).
- Silverlance. An amalgamation of DC's Devilance the Pursuer and Marvel's Quicksilver (Pietro Maximoff).
- Virmin Vundavort. An amalgamation of DC's Virman Vundabar and Marvel's the Toad (Mortimer Toynbee).
- Disastermind. An amalgamation of DC's DeSaad and Marvel's Mastermind (Jason Wyngarde).
- "King" Cain and "Smiling" Abel. An amalgamation of DC's Cain and Abel and the names of Marvel's Jack "The King" Kirby and "Smilin'" Stan Lee.
  - The House of Monsters and The House of Creatures. An amalgamation of DC's the House of Mystery and the House of Secrets, respectively, and elements of Marvel's monster comics.
- Two-Face. An amalgamation of DC's Two-Face (Harvey Dent) and Marvel's Arnim Zola.
  - The Double Helix-DNA Project. An Amalgam Universe organization of which DC's part of the amalgamation is Project Cadmus. Marvel's part of the amalgamation is unknown.
- The Silver Streak. An amalgamation of DC's Streaky the Supercat and Marvel's the Silver Surfer (Norrin Radd).
- The Living Totem Pole. An Amalgam Universe character of whom Marvel's parts of the amalgamation are the Living Totem and Wyatt Wingfoot. DC's part of the amalgamation is unknown.
  - The Bottle City of Latveria. An amalgamation of DC's the Bottle City of Kandor and Marvel's Latveria.
- The Spider-Clones. An amalgamation of DC's Bizarro #1 and Marvel's Spider-Man clones (clones of Peter Parker, especially the one renamed Ben Reilly).

==== Deadpool/Batman #1 (September 2025) ====
- Logo. An amalgamation of DC's Lobo and Marvel's Wolverine (James Howlett a.k.a. "Logan").

==== Batman/Deadpool #1 (November 2025) ====
- Deadbat. An amalgamation of DC's Batman (Bruce Wayne) and Marvel's Deadpool (Wade Wilson).

== Comics ==
=== April 1996 – DC Comics ===
==== Amazon #1 ====
- Wonder Woman a.k.a. Amazon (Princess Ororo of Themiscyra). An amalgamation of DC's Wonder Woman (Princess Diana of Themiscyra) and Marvel's Storm (Ororo Munroe) (an alternate version of this character also appears with the other six characters in DC/Marvel: All Access #4 (see above)).
- Circe. An amalgamation of DC's Circe and Marvel's Sersi.
- Giganta. An amalgamation of DC's Giganta (Doris Zuel) and Marvel's Gargantua (Edward Cobert).
- Panthera. An amalgamation of DC's Pantha (Rosabelle Mendez) and Marvel's Feral (Maria Callasantos).
- Professor Psycho. An amalgamation of DC's Doctor Psycho (Edgar Cizko) and Marvel's Professor Power (Anthony Power).

==== Assassins #1 ====
- Catsai (Elektra Kyle). An amalgamation of DC's Catwoman (Selina Kyle) and Marvel's Elektra Natchios.
- Dare the Terminator (Slade Murdock). A female amalgamation of DC's Deathstroke the Terminator (Slade Wilson) and Marvel's Daredevil (Matt Murdock).
- Jericha. An amalgamation of DC's Jericho (Joseph Wilson) and Marvel's Karma (Xi’an Coy Manh).
- The Big Question (Edward Nigma Fisk a.k.a. Enigma Fisk). An amalgamation of DC's the Riddler (Edward Nashton, later changed to Edward Nigma or "E. Nigma") and Marvel's the Kingpin (Wilson Grant Fisk).
- I Ching. An Amalgam Universe version of DC's I Ching.
- Winterstick. An amalgamation of DC's Wintergreen (William Randolph Wintergreen) and Marvel's Stick.
- Wired (Nathan Chase). An amalgamation of DC's the Manhunter (Chase Lawler) and Marvel's Cable (Nathan Summers).
- Jimmy Urich. An amalgamation of DC's Jimmy Olsen and Marvel's Ben Urich.
- J. Jonah White. An amalgamation of DC's Perry White and Marvel's J. Jonah Jameson.
  - The Gotham Bugle. An amalgamation of DC's The Gotham Gazette and Marvel's The Daily Bugle.
- "Smilin'" Stan Schwartz. An amalgamation of the names of DC's Julius "Julie" Schwartz and Marvel's "Smilin'" Stan Lee.
- Kevin Berganza. An amalgamation of the names of DC's Eddie Berganza and Kevin Dooley. Marvel has no part in this amalgamation.
- Frank O'Neil. An amalgamation of the names of DC's Denny O'Neil and Marvel's Frank Miller.
- J. M. Wolfman. An amalgamation of the names of DC's Marv Wolfman and Marvel's J. M. DeMatteis.

==== Doctor Strangefate #1 ====
- Nabu the Ancient One. An amalgamation of DC's Nabu the Wise and Marvel's Yao the Ancient One.
- The Abominite. An amalgamation of DC's the Hellgrammite (Roderik Rose) and Marvel's the Abomination (Emil Blonsky).
- Myx. An amalgamation of DC's Mister Mxyzptlk and Marvel's Wong.
- Jade Nova (Frankie Rayner). An amalgamation of DC's Green Lantern (Kyle Rayner) and Jade (Jennifer-Lynn Hayden) and Marvel's Nova (Frankie Raye).
- The White Witch (Wanda Zatara). An amalgamation of DC's Zatanna Zatara and Marvel's the Scarlet Witch (Wanda Maximoff).
- Baron Wotan. An amalgamation of DC's Wotan and Marvel's Baron Karl Mordo.
- Mephisatanus. An amalgamation of DC's Lord Satanus and Marvel's Mephisto.
- Arcane. An Amalgam Universe version of DC's Abigail Arcane.

==== JLX #1 ====
- Captain Marvel (William "Billy" Mar-Vell). An amalgamation of DC's Captain Marvel (Billy Batson) and Marvel's Captain Marvel (Mar-Vell).
- The Angelhawk (Warren Hall). An amalgamation of DC's Hawkman (Carter Hall) and Marvel's the Angel (Warren Worthington III).
- Goliath (Oliver Queen). An amalgamation of DC's the Green Arrow (Oliver Queen) and Marvel's Goliath (Bill Foster).
- Hawkeye (Clint Archer). An amalgamation of DC's the Green Arrow (Connor Hawke) and Marvel's Hawkeye (Clint Barton).
- The Canary (Dinah Barton). An amalgamation of DC's the Black Canary (Dinah Laurel Lance) and Marvel's the Mockingbird (Barbara "Bobbi" Morse-Barton).
- The Wraith (Todd LeBeau). An amalgamation of DC's Obsidian (Todd Rice) and Marvel's Gambit (Remy LeBeau).
- Apollo (Ray Summers). An amalgamation of DC's the Ray (Ray Terrill) and Marvel's Cyclops (Scott Summers).
- Mister X (J'onn J'onzz). An amalgamation of DC's the Martian Manhunter (J'onn J'onzz a.k.a. John Jones) and Marvel's Professor X (Charles Xavier).
  - The Skrull. An amalgamation of DC's the Green Martians and Marvel's the Skrulls.
- Runaway. An amalgamation of DC's Gypsy (Cynthia "Cindy" Reynolds) and Marvel's Rogue (Anna Marie (maiden name unknown), later Anna Marie LeBeau).
- The Aqua-Mariner (Arthur McKenzie). An amalgamation of DC's Aquaman (Orin a.k.a. Arthur Curry) and Marvel's Namor the Sub-Mariner (Namor McKenzie).
- Firebird (Beatriz Grey). An amalgamation of DC's Fire (Beatriz Da Costa) and Marvel's Phoenix (Jean Grey).
- Mercury (Pietro "Pete" Allen). An amalgamation of DC's Impulse (Bart Allen) and Marvel's Quicksilver (Pietro Maximoff).
- Will Magnus. An amalgamation of DC's Will Magnus and Marvel's Bolivar Trask.
- The Sentinels. An Amalgam Universe version of DC's the Manhunters and Marvel's the Sentinels.
- Jocasta. An amalgamation of DC's Platinum of the Metal Men and Marvel's Jocasta (full name: Jocasta Pym), Millie the Model (Millie Collins) and one of the Sentinels.
- Professor Kang. An amalgamation of DC's Professor Zoom the Reverse-Flash (Eobard Thawne) and Marvel's Kang the Conqueror (Nathaniel Richards).
- Warlord Gh'ul. An amalgamation of DC's Ra's al Ghul and Marvel's Warlord Krang.
- Botanique a.k.a. Ms. Tique (Pamela Darkhölme). An amalgamation of DC's Poison Ivy (Pamela Isley) and Marvel's Mystique (Raven Darkhölme).
- Sunfirestorm. An amalgamation of DC's Firestorm the Nuclear Man (a fusion of Ronnie Raymond and Martin Stein) and Marvel's Sunfire (Shiro Yoshida).
- Lord Nimrod. An amalgamation of DC's Lord Havok (Alexi Nikolai) and Marvel's Nimrod.

==== Legends of the Dark Claw #1 ====
- The Hyena (Creed H. Quinn). An amalgamation of DC's the Joker (real name unknown, but has used the alias "Harlan Quinn") and Marvel's Sabretooth (Victor Creed).
- The Huntress (Carol Danvers). An amalgamation of DC's the Huntress (Helena Bertinelli) and Marvel's Carol Danvers.
- Sparrow (Jubilation Lee). An amalgamation of DC's Robin (Tim Drake) and Marvel's Jubilee (Jubilation Lee).
- John Jones, Vampire Hunter. An amalgamation of DC's the Martian Manhunter (J'onn J'onnz a.k.a. John Jones) and Marvel's Blade the Vampire-Slayer (Eric Brooks).

==== Super-Soldier #1 ====
- James Olsen. An Amalgam Universe version of DC's Jimmy Olsen with elements of Marvel's Bucky Barnes.
- Sharon Carter. An amalgamation of DC's Lois Lane and Marvel's Sharon Carter.
- The Green Skull (Lex Luthor). An amalgamation of DC's Lex Luthor and Marvel's the Red Skull (Johann Shmidt).
- Ultra-Metallo. An amalgamation of DC's Metallo (John Corben) and Marvel's the First Sleeper.
- The Doomnaut. An amalgamation of DC's Doomsday and Marvel's the Juggernaut (Cain Marko).
- The American Girl (Carol Barnes). An amalgamation of DC's Supergirl (Kara Zor-El a.k.a. Linda Lee Danvers) and Marvel's Carol Danvers and Bucky Barnes.

=== April 1996 – Marvel Comics ===
==== Bruce Wayne: Agent of S.H.I.E.L.D. #1 ====
- Bruce Wayne. An Amalgam Universe version of DC's Bruce Wayne.
- Nick Fury. An Amalgam Universe version of Marvel's Nick Fury.
- Madame Cat (Selina Luthor). An amalgamation of DC's Catwoman (Selina Kyle) and Marvel's Madame Hydra (Ophelia Sarkissian).
- Nuke (Bane Simpson). An amalgamation of DC's Bane (Eduardo Dorrance) and Marvel's Nuke (Frank Simpson).
- Baron Zero (Baron Wolfgang von Strucker). An amalgamation of DC's Mister Freeze (Victor Fries, originally known as Mister Zero) and Marvel's Baron Wolfgang von Strucker.
- Deathlok (Jason Todd). An amalgamation of DC's Jason Todd and Marvel's Deathlok the Demolisher (Luther Manning) and Midnight (Jeff Wilde).
- The Black Bat (Barbara Gordon Hardy). An amalgamation of DC's Batgirl (Barbara Gordon) and Marvel's the Black Cat (Felicia Hardy).
- Moonwing (Dick Grayson). An amalgamation of DC's Nightwing (Dick Grayson) and Marvel's the Moon Knight (Marc Spector).
- Sgt. Rock. An Amalgam Universe version of DC's Sgt. Frank Rock.
- Tony Stark. An Amalgam Universe version of Marvel's Tony Stark.

==== Bullets and Bracelets #1 ====
- Diana Prince (Princess Diana of Themyscira). An Amalgam Universe version of DC's Wonder Woman (Diana Prince) with elements of Marvel's Elektra Natchios.
- The Punisher (Trevor Castle). An amalgamation of DC's Steve Trevor and Marvel's the Punisher (Frank Castle).
- The Bronze Panther. An amalgamation of DC's the Bronze Tiger (Ben Turner) and Marvel's the Black Panther (T'Challa).
- War Monarch (Jim Rhodes). An amalgamation of DC's Monarch (Hank Hall) and Marvel's War Machine (Jim Rhodes).
- Big Titania. An amalgamation of DC's Big Barda and Marvel's Titania (Mary MacPherran).
- Bernadeth. An Amalgam Universe version of DC's Bernadeth.
- Lashina. An Amalgam Universe version of DC's Lashina.
- Mad Harriet. An Amalgam Universe version of DC's Mad Harriet.
- Stompa. An Amalgam Universe version of DC's Stompa.
- Granny Harkness. An amalgamation of DC's Granny Goodness and Marvel's Agatha Harkness.
- Thanoseid. An amalgamation of DC's Darkseid (Uxas) and Marvel's Thanos the Mad Titan.
- Kanto. An Amalgam Universe version of DC's Kanto.
- All Highfather Odin. An amalgamation of DC's Highfather (Izaya) and Marvel's Odin the All-Father (full name: Odin Borson).
- Scott Free. An Amalgam Universe version of DC's Mister Miracle (Scott Free).

==== Magneto and the Magnetic Men #1 ====
- Magneto (Erik Magnus). An amalgamation of DC's Will Magnus and Marvel's Magneto (Max Eisenhardt a.k.a. Erik Lehnsherr).
- Antimony (Debbie Walker). An amalgamation of DC's Platinum of the Metal Men and Debbi Anderson and Marvel's the Scarlet Witch (Wanda Maximoff) and Patsy Walker.
- Bismuth (Snapper Jones). An amalgamation of DC's Tin of the Metal Men and Snapper Carr and Marvel's the Toad (Mortimer Toynbee) and Rick Jones.
- Cobalt (Lucius Richmond). An amalgamation of DC's Gold of the Metal Men and Lucius Fox and Marvel's Mastermind (Jason Wyngarde) and Kyle Richmond.
- Nickel (Lance Vale). An amalgamation of DC's Mercury of the Metal Men and Vicki Vale and Marvel's Quicksilver (Pietro Maximoff) and Lance Bannon.
- Iron (John Henry Steele). An amalgamation of DC's Iron of the Metal Men and Steel (John Henry Irons) and Marvel's Unus the Untouchable (Angelo Unuscione a.k.a. Gunther Bain).
- Kokoro (Tatsu "Betsy" Braddock). An amalgamation of DC's Katana (Tatsu Yamashiro) and Marvel's Psylocke (Betsy Braddock).
- Haloroma. An amalgamation of DC's Halo (Violet Harper) and Marvel's Roma.
- Sinistron. An amalgamation of DC's Psimon (Simon Jones) and Marvel's Mister Sinister (Nathaniel Essex).
- The Tyrannoids of Latkovia. There are two things here:
  - an Amalgam Universe version of Marvel's the Tyrannoids.
  - an amalgamation of DC's Markovia and Marvel's Latveria.

==== Speed Demon #1 ====
- Hal "Madman" Jordan. An amalgamation of DC's Hal Jordan and elements of Marvel's Star Brand comics.
- Sinestro. An amalgamation of DC's Sinestro (full name: Thaal Sinestro) and elements of Marvel's Star Brand comics.
- Uatu the Guardian. An amalgamation of DC's Ganthet, one of the Guardians of the Universe and Marvel's Uatu, one of the Watchers.
- The Speed Demon (Blaze Allen). An amalgamation of DC's the Flash (Barry Allen) and Etrigan the Demon and Marvel's the Ghost Rider (a bonding of Johnny Blaze and Zarathos).
- Kid Demon (Wally Allen). An amalgamation of DC's Kid Flash (Wally West) and Marvel's the Ghost Rider (a bonding of Danny Ketch and the Angel of Death).
- The Blob. An amalgamation of DC's Chunk (Chester P. Runk) and Marvel's the Blob (Fred Dukes).
- Miss Miracle. An amalgamation of DC's Mister Miracle (Scott Free) and Marvel's Crystal (full name: Crystalia Amaquelin).
- Puck. An amalgamation of DC's Oberon (full name: Oberon Kurtzberg) and Marvel's Puck (Eugene Milton Judd).
- The Night Spectre. An amalgamation of DC's the Spectre (Aztar) and Marvel's Nightmare.
- The Two-Faced Goblin (Harvey Osborn). An amalgamation of DC's Two-Face (Harvey Dent) and Marvel's the Green Goblin (Norman Osborn).
- The Scarecrow. An amalgamation of DC's version of the Scarecrow (Jonathan Crane) and Marvel's version of the Scarecrow (Ebenezer Laughton).
- Siliconman. An amalgamation of DC's Plastic Man (Patrick "Eel" O'Brian) and Marvel's the Sandman (William Baker a.k.a. Flint Marko).
- The Arrowcaster. An amalgamation of DC's Speedy (Roy Harper Jr.) and Marvel's the Nightcaster.
- Iris Simpson. An amalgamation of DC's Iris West-Allen and Marvel's Roxanne Simpson.
- Father Hellstrom. An Amalgam Universe version of Marvel's Daimon Hellstrom.
- Merlyn. An amalgamation of DC's version of Merlin and Marvel's version of Merlin.
- The Ringmaster. An Amalgam Universe version of Marvel's the Ringmaster (Maynard Tiboldt).
- The Great Gambonnos. An Amalgam Universe version of Marvel's the Great Gambonnos (Ernesto and Luigi Gambonno).
- The Human Cannonball. An Amalgam Universe version of Marvel's the Human Cannonball (Jack Pulver).
- The Clown. An Amalgam Universe version of Marvel's the Clown (Eliot Franklin).
- Rintrah. An Amalgam Universe version of Marvel's Rintrah.
- The Super-Skrull. An Amalgam Universe version of Marvel's the Super-Skrull (Kl'rt).
- The Leader. An Amalgam Universe version of Marvel's the Leader (Sam Sterns).

==== Spider-Boy #1 ====
- Bizarnage. An amalgamation of DC's Bizarro #1 and Marvel's Carnage (Cletus Kasady).
- The Guardian Angel (Doctor Tom Harper). An amalgamation of DC's the Guardian (Jim Harper) and Marvel's the Angel (Thomas Halloway).
- King Lizard. An amalgamation of DC's King Shark (Nanaue) and Marvel's the Lizard (Curt Connors).
- "Brooklyn" Barnes. An amalgamation of DC's Dan "Terrible" Turpin (a.k.a. "Brooklyn") and Marvel's Bucky Barnes.
- The Insect Queen (Mary Jane Watson). An amalgamation of DC's the Insect Queen (Lana Lang) and Marvel's Mary Jane Watson.
- Professor Dubbilex. An amalgamation of DC's Dubbilex and Marvel's Professor X (Charles Xavier).
- Mystallo. An amalgamation of DC's Metallo (John Corben) and Marvel's Mysterio (Quentin Beck).
- Ka-Zar. An amalgamation of DC's the Warlord (Travis Morgan) and Marvel's Ka-Zar (Kevin Plunder)
- This issue also features Amalgam Universe versions of various non-amalgamated characters, including DC's Ray Palmer, Jack Ryder, Dabney Donovan, Rex Leech, Roxy Leech and Sam Makoa, and Marvel's Peter Parker, Hank Pym, Otto Octavius, Curt Connors, Thunderbolt Ross, the Freak, J. Jonah Jameson, Betty Brant, and Flash Thompson.

==== X-Patrol #1 ====
- Niles Cable. An amalgamation of DC's the Chief (Niles Caulder) and Marvel's Cable (Nathan Summers) and Professor X (Charles Xavier).
- Elastigirl (Janet van Dyne). An amalgamation of DC's Elasti-Girl (Rita Farr Dayton) and Marvel's Domino (Neena Thurman) and the Wasp (Janet van Dyne).
- The Beastling (Hank Logan). An amalgamation of DC's the Changeling (Gar Logan) and Marvel's the Beast (Hank McCoy).
- Ferro Man (Piotyr Rasputin). An amalgamation of DC's Ferro Lad (Andrew Nolan) and Marvel's Colossus (Piotr "Peter" Rasputin).
- Shatterstarfire. An amalgamation of DC's Starfire (Koriand'r) and Marvel's Shatterstar (Gaveedra-Seven a.k.a. Benjamin Russell).
- Dial H.U.S.K. (Paige Guthrie). An amalgamation of elements of DC's Dial H for Hero comics and Marvel's Husk (Paige Guthrie).
  - Wonder Girl. An amalgamation of DC's Wonder Girl (Donna Troy) and Marvel's Wonder Man (Simon Williams).
  - Polaris. An amalgamation of DC's Doctor Polaris (Neal Emerson) and Marvel's Polaris (Lorna Sally Dane).
  - Mary Marvel Girl. An amalgamation of DC's Mary Marvel (Mary Bromfield) and Marvel's Marvel Girl (Jean Grey).
  - Artemisty Knight. An amalgamation of DC's Artemis of Bana-Mighdall and Marvel's Misty Knight.
- The Torpedo (Sam Guthrie). An amalgamation of DC's the Torpedoman and Marvel's Cannonball (Sam Guthrie).
- Alexei Rasputin. An amalgamation of DC's Douglas Nolan (Ferro Lad's twin brother) and Marvel's Mikhail Rasputin (Colossus's older brother).

=== June 1997 – DC Comics ===
==== Bat-Thing #1 ====
- Alicia Murdock the Little Blind Girl. An Amalgam Universe character of whom Marvel's part of the amalgamation is Alicia Masters and Daredevil (Matt Murdock). DC's part of the amalgamation is unknown.
- The Bat-Thing (Kirk Sallis). An amalgamation of DC's the Man-Bat (Kirk Langstrom) and Marvel's the Man-Thing (Ted Sallis).
- Bingle-Burry the Two-Headed Dog. An Amalgam Universe character of whom DC and Marvel's parts of the amalgamation are both unknown.
- Detective Clark Bullock. An Amalgam Universe version of DC's Harvey Bullock.
- Detective Christine Montoya. An Amalgam Universe version of DC's Renee Montoya.
- Francie-Ellen Sallis. An amalgamation of DC's Francine Langstrom and Marvel's Ellen Brandt.
- Howard the Mxyzptlx. An amalgamation of DC's Mister Mxyzptlk and Marvel's Howard the Duck (Howard Duckson).

==== Dark Claw Adventures #1 ====
- Patch Malone (an alternate identity used by the Dark Claw). An amalgamation of DC's Matches Malone (an alternate identity used by Batman) and Marvel's Patch (an alternate identity used by Wolverine).
- Lady Talia. An amalgamation of DC's Talia al Ghul and Marvel's Lady Deathstrike (Yuriko Oyama).
- Ra's a-Pocalypse. An amalgamation of DC's Ra's al Ghul and Marvel's Apocalypse (En Sabah Nur).
- THX 1138. An original Amalgam Comics character whose name is a reference to THX 1138 (1971), George Lucas's first film.
- Ubuwong. An amalgamation of DC's Ubu and Marvel's Wong.
- Cybercroc. An amalgamation of DC's Killer Croc (Waylon Jones) and Marvel's Cyber (Silas Burr).
- The Bloodcrow. An amalgamation of DC's version of the Scarecrow (Jonathan Crane) and Marvel's Bloodscream (originally known as Bloodsport).
- Spiral Harley. An amalgamation of DC's Harley Quinn (Harleen "Harley" Quinzel) and Marvel's Spiral (Rita Wayword).
- The Omega Beast. An amalgamation of DC's the KGBeast (Anatoli Knyazev) and Marvel's Omega Red (Arkady Gregorivich Rossovich).

==== Generation Hex #1 ====
- Jono Hex. An amalgamation of DC's Jonah Hex and Marvel's Chamber (Jonothon Evan Starsmore).
- Aurora Trigger. An amalgamation of DC's Wayne Trigger and Cinnamon (Kate Manser) and Marvel's Aurora (Jeanne-Marie Beaubier).
- Northstar Trigger. An amalgamation of DC's Walter Trigger and Marvel's Northstar (Jean-Paul Beaubier).
- Madame Banshee. An amalgamation of DC's Madame .44 (Jeanne Walker Tane) and Marvel's the Banshee (Sean Cassidy).
- Johnny Random. An amalgamation of DC's Johnny Thunder and Marvel's Random (Marshall Evan Stone III).
- Skinhunter. An amalgamation of DC's Scalphunter (Brian Savage a.k.a. Ke-Woh-No-Tay ("He Who Is Less Than Human")) and Marvel's Skin (Angelo Espinosa).
- The White Whip. An amalgamation of DC's the Whip (Rodrigo "Rodney" Elwood Gaynor) and Marvel's the White Queen (Emma Frost).
- Nightgate. An amalgamation of DC's Nighthawk (Hannibal Hawkes) and Marvel's Gateway.
- Retribution. An amalgamation of DC's Firehair and Marvel's Penance (Monet Yvette Clarisse Maria Therese St. Croix).
- El Papamondo. An amalgamation of DC's El Papagayo and Marvel's Mondo.
- Pow Wow Boom Boom Smith. An amalgamation of DC's Pow Wow Smith (Ohiyesa Smith) and Marvel's Boom-Boom (Tabitha Smith).
- Thunderhawk. An amalgamation of DC's Tomahawk (Tom Hawk a.k.a. Thomas Haukins) and Marvel's Thunderbird (John Proudstar).
- Thunderchick – Daughter of Thunderhawk. An amalgamation of DC's Hawk – Son of Tomahawk (Hawk Haukins) and Marvel's Siryn (Theresa Maeve Rourke Cassidy).
- Marshal "Bat" Trask. An amalgamation of DC's Bat Lash (Bartholomew Aloysius Lash) and Marvel's Bolivar Trask.
- The Razormen. An amalgamation of DC's the Scissormen and Marvel's the Sentinels.
- Black Tom Savage. An amalgamation of DC's Matt Savage, Trail Boss and Marvel's Black Tom Cassidy.
- The Shaggynaut. An amalgamation of DC's the Shaggy Man and Marvel's the Juggernaut (Cain Marko).
- M-Parasiteplate. An amalgamation of DC's the Parasite (Rudy Jones) and Marvel's Emplate (Marius St. Croix).
- The Six-Gun Triplicate Kid. An amalgamation of DC's Triplicate Girl (Luornu Durgo) and Marvel's the Two-Gun Kid (Matt Liebowicz a.k.a. Matthew J. Hawkins or Matt Hawk).

==== JLX Unleashed #1 ====
- Savage Shaw. An amalgamation of DC's Vandal Savage (Vandar Adg) and Marvel's Sebastian Shaw.
- Mistress Maxima. An amalgamation of DC's Maxima and Marvel's the White Queen (Emma Frost).
- Dark Firebird. An amalgamation of DC's Fire (Beatriz Da Costa) and Marvel's Dark Phoenix (Jean Grey).
- Lord Maxwell Hodge. An amalgamation of DC's Maxwell Lord and Marvel's Cameron Hodge.
- Mephiston. An amalgamation of DC's Neron and Marvel's Mephisto.
- Fin Fang Flame. An amalgamation of DC's Brimstone and Marvel's Fin Fang Foom.
- Mongslaught. An amalgamation of DC's Mongul and Marvel's Onslaught.
- Apocalypso. An amalgamation of DC's Eclipso (Kaala) and Marvel's Apocalypse (En Sabah Nur).
- The Iceberg. An amalgamation of DC's Ice (Tora Olafsdotter) and Marvel's the Iceman (Bobby Drake).
- Chaos (Joshua Summers). An amalgamation of DC's Spitfire (Joshua Terrill) and Marvel's Havok (Alex Summers).
- The Red Vision. An amalgamation of DC's the Red Tornado and Marvel's the Vision.
- The Blue Jacket. An amalgamation of DC's the Blue Beetle (Ted Kord) and Marvel's Yellowjacket (Hank Pym).
- Wonder-Gold. An amalgamation of DC's Booster Gold (Michael Jon "Booster" Carter) and Marvel's Wonder Man (Simon Williams).
- Metamimic. An amalgamation of DC's Metamorpho the Element Man (Rex Mason) and Marvel's Mimic (Calvin Rankin).
- Iriskani. An amalgamation of DC's Iris West-Allen and Marvel's Askani (Rachel Summers).
- Dum Dum Dugan. An Amalgam Universe version of Marvel's Timothy Aloysius Cadwallader "Dum Dum" Dugan.
- Sallie Jesse Donahue. An amalgamation of the names of the talk show hosts Sally Jessy Raphael and Phil Donahue.

==== Lobo the Duck #1 ====
- Lobo the Duck. An amalgamation of DC's Lobo and Marvel's Howard the Duck (Howard Duckson).
- The Impossible Dawg. An amalgamation of DC's Dawg and Marvel's the Impossible Man.
- Vikki Valkyrie. An amalgamation of DC's Vicki Vale and Marvel's the Valkyrie (Brunnhilde).
- Hawkhawk. An amalgamation of DC's Hawkman (Carter Hall) and Marvel's Nighthawk (Kyle Richmond).
- Doctor Bongface. An amalgamation of DC's Scarface and Marvel's Doctor Bong (Lester Verde).
- Al Forbush. An amalgamation of DC's Ma Hunkel (Abigail Mathilda "Ma" Hunkel) and Marvel's Blind Al (Althea Winifred Sanderson) and Forbush Man (Irving Forbush).
- Bevarlene. An amalgamation of DC's Darlene Spritzer and Marvel's Beverly Switzler.
- Ambush the Lunatik. An amalgamation of DC's Ambush Bug (Irwin Schwab) and Marvel's Lunatik (Arisen Tyrk a.k.a. "Harrison Turk").
- Jonas Turnip. An amalgamation of DC's Jonas Glim and Marvel's the Turnip-Man (a fusion of Arthur Winslow and Phelch the Space Turnip).
- Daryl Rutabaga. An amalgamation of elements of DC's Jonas Glim and elements of Marvel's the Turnip-Man (a fusion of Arthur Winslow and Phelch the Space Turnip).
- Billie the Millie. An amalgamation of DC's Billy the Girl and Marvel's Millie the Model (Millie Collins).
- Gamorola. An amalgamation of DC's Princess Shao-La (Shaola von Darragon) and Marvel's Gamora Zen Whoberi Ben Titan.
- Gold-Kidney Lady. An amalgamation of DC's Goldstar (Ernest Widdle) and Marvel's the Kidney Lady (Selma Blotte).
- The Godthing. An amalgamation of DC's Gawd (Cecil Geekywad Bumwimple) and Marvel's the Chair-Thing.

==== Super-Soldier: Man of War #1 ====
- The American Belle. An amalgamation of DC's the Liberty Belle (Libby Lawrence) and Marvel's Miss America (Madeline Joyce Frank).
- The Human Lantern. An amalgamation of DC's the Golden Age Green Lantern (Alan Scott) and Marvel's the android version of the Human Torch (Jim Hammond).
- The Whiz. An amalgamation of DC's the Golden Age Flash (Jay Garrick) and Marvel's the Whizzer (Robert Frank).
- Sgt. Rock. An Amalgam Comics version of Sgt. Frank Rock.
- Wildman Percy. An amalgamation of DC's Wildman (Harold Shapiro) and Marvel's Percival "Pinky" Pinkerton.
- Little Dum Dum. An amalgamation of DC's Little Sure Shot (Louis Kiyahani) and Marvel's Timothy Aloysius Cadwallader "Dum Dum" Dugan.
- Bulldozer Gabriel. An amalgamation of DC's Bulldozer (Horace Eustace Canfield) and Marvel's Gabe Jones.
- Ice-Cream Cohen. An amalgamation of DC's Ice Cream Soldier (Phil Mason) and Marvel's Izzy Cohen.
- Rebel Farmer. An amalgamation of DC's Farmer Boy and Marvel's Rebel Ralston (Robert "Rebel" Ralston).
- Dino Four-Eyes. An amalgamation of DC's Four Eyes and Marvel's Dino Manelli.
- Mademoiselle Peggy. An amalgamation of DC's Mademoiselle Marie and Marvel's Peggy Carter.
- Major Zemo. An amalgamation of DC's the Iron Major (Franz (last name unknown)) and Marvel's Baron Heinrich Zemo.
- Lois Luthor. An Amalgam Comics version of Lois Lane.

=== June 1997 – Marvel Comics ===
==== Challengers of the Fantastic #1 ====
- Reed "Prof" Richards. An amalgamation of DC's Walter Mark "Prof" Haley and Marvel's Mister Fantastic (Reed Richards).
- Susan "Ace" Storm. An amalgamation of DC's Kyle "Ace" Morgan and Marvel's the Invisible Woman (Sue Storm-Richards).
- Johnny "Red" Storm. An amalgamation of DC's Matthew "Red" Ryan and Marvel's the Human Torch (Johnny Storm).
- Ben "Rocky" Grimm a.k.a. The Four-Armed Thing. An amalgamation of DC's Leslie "Rocky" Davis and the Four-Armed Terror and Marvel's the Thing (Ben Grimm).
- Comrade Grodd. An amalgamation of DC's Gorilla Grodd and elements of Marvel's the Super-Apes.
- Congo-Red. An amalgamation of DC's Congorilla (William "Congo Bill" Glenmorgan) and elements of Marvel's the Super-Apes.
- Moon Boy. An Amalgam Universe version of Marvel's Moon-Boy.
- The Red Ghost (Kragoff). An Amalgam Universe version of Marvel's the Red Ghost (Ivan Kragoff) with some elements of DC's Gorilla City.
- Vykin the Black Bolt. An amalgamation of DC's Vykin the Black and Marvel's Black Bolt (full name: Blackagar Boltagon).
- Medusa Moonrider. An amalgamation of DC's Mark Moonrider and Marvel's Medusa (full name: Medusalith Amaquelin-Boltagon).
- Dream Crystal. An amalgamation of DC's Beautiful Dreamer and Marvel's Crystal (full name: Crystalia Amaquelin).
- Triserinak. An amalgamation of DC's Serifan and Marvel's Triton (full name unknown) and Karnak the Shatterer (full name: Karnak Mander-Azur).
- Big Gorgon. An amalgamation of DC's Big Bear and Marvel's Gorgon (full name: Gorgon Petragon).
- Lockbroot. An amalgamation of DC's Broot (Charis-Nar) and Marvel's Lockjaw.
- Galactiac. An amalgamation of DC's Brainiac (Vril Dox) and Marvel's Galactus (Galan).
- The Silver Racer (Willie Lincoln). An amalgamation of DC's the Black Racer (Willie Walker) and Marvel's the Silver Surfer (Norrin Radd) .
- Wyatt Flying Stag. An amalgamation of DC's Super-Chief (Flying Stag) and Marvel's Wyatt Wingfoot.
- Vicky Sheldon. An amalgamation of DC's Vicki Vale and Marvel's Phil Sheldon.
- June Masters. An amalgamation of DC's June Robbins and Marvel's Alicia Masters.
- Tino Lumpkin. An amalgamation of DC's Marty Ryan a.k.a. "Tino Mannary" and Marvel's Willie Lumpkin.
- Corinna Evans. An amalgamation of DC's Corinna Stark and Marvel's Dorrie Evans.
- Johnny Stormtrooper. An amalgamation of DC's Scrapper Trooper and Marvel's the Human Torch (Johnny Storm).
- The Multi-Master. An amalgamation of DC's Multi-Man (Duncan Pramble) and Marvel's the Puppet Master (Philip Masters).
- Ultivac the Multi-Robot. An amalgamation of multiple DC and Marvel characters, including DC's Ultivac and Ultra the Multi-Alien (Ace Arn) and Marvel's the Destroyer, Machine Man (Z2P45-9-X-51 a.k.a. X-51 or Aaron Stack), and one of Galactus's robots named the Punishers.
- Diablo the Volcano Man. An amalgamation of one of DC's the Volcano Men and Marvel's Diablo (Esteban Corazón de Ablo).
- Drabny the Fixer. An amalgamation of DC's Drabny and Marvel's the Fixer (Paul Norbert Ebersol).
- The Radioactive Kra. An amalgamation of DC's Kra the Living Robot and Marvel's the Radioactive Man (Chen Lu).
- Cosbie. An amalgamation of DC's Cosmo the Space Racoon and Marvel's H.E.R.B.I.E.
- The Banisher. An amalgamation of DC's Bane (Eduardo Dorrance) and Marvel's the Punisher (Frank Castle).
- The Infant Mite Terrible. An amalgamation of DC's Bat-Mite and Marvel's the Infant Terrible (later known as the Delinquent).
- Dynashield. An Amalgam Universe combination of DC's versions of Dynamo (Leonard Brown) and the Shield (Joe Higgins).
- The No-Fly. An Amalgam Universe combination of DC's versions of No-Man (Anthony Dunn) and the Fly (Tommy Troy).
  - Radiotower Comics. An Amalgam Universe combination of the names of the comic book companies Tower Comics and Radio Comics.

==== The Exciting X-Patrol #1 ====
- Jericho (Niles Dayspring). An amalgamation of DC's Jericho (Joseph Wilson) and Marvel's X-Man (Nate Grey).
- Brother Brood (Sebastian Brood). An amalgamation of DC's Brother Blood (Sebastian Blood VIII) and Marvel's the Brood.
  - The Cult of Brood. An amalgamation of DC's the Church of Blood and Marvel's the Brood.
- Raveniya Dayspring. An amalgamation of DC's Raven (Rachel Roth) and Marvel's Aliya Dayspring.
- Terra-X the Destroyer. An amalgamation of DC's Terra (Tara Markov) and Marvel's Terrax the Tamer (Tyros).
- Black Orchid the Unknown. An amalgamation of DC's the Black Orchid (Susan Linden-Thorne) and Marvel's Omega the Unknown (James-Michael Starling).
- Shang Prez, Master of Kung Fu. An amalgamation of DC's Prez Rickard and Marvel's Shang-Chi, Master of Kung Fu (full name: Zheng Shang-Chi).
- The Sea Devil Dinosaurs. An amalgamation of DC's the Sea Devils and Marvel's Devil Dinosaur.
- The Vigilante Kid. An amalgamation of DC's the Vigilante (Greg Saunders) and Marvel's the Rawhide Kid (Johnny Bart a.k.a. Johnny Clay).
- Deaddevil, the Man without Life. An amalgamation of DC's Deadman (Boston Brand) and Marvel's Daredevil (Matt Murdock).
- The Silver Tornado. An amalgamation of DC's the Red Tornado and Marvel's the Silver Centurion Armor of Iron Man.
- The Atomic Black Knight. An amalgamation of DC's the Atomic Knight (Gardner Grayle) and Marvel's the Black Knight (Dane Whitman).
- X-Stroke the Eliminator. An amalgamation of DC's Deathstroke the Terminator (Slade Wilson) and Marvel's the X-Cutioner (Carl Denti).
- Amanda Deathbird. An amalgamation of DC's Amanda Waller and Marvel's Deathbird (Cal'syee Neramani).
- Hawk and Dagger. An amalgamation of DC's the Hawk and the Dove (Hank Hall and Dawn Granger) and Marvel's Cloak and Dagger (Tyrone Johnson and Tandy Bowen).
- Stryfe. An Amalgam Universe version of Marvel's Stryfe.
- Despayre. An Amalgam Universe version of Marvel's D'Spayre.

==== Iron Lantern #1 ====
- Iron Lantern (Hal Stark). An amalgamation of DC's Green Lantern (Hal Jordan) and Marvel's Iron Man (Tony Stark).
- Oa the Living Planet. An amalgamation of DC's Oa, the homeworld of the Guardians of the Universe, and Marvel's Ego the Living Planet.
- Tagak the Lantern-Lord. An amalgamation of elements of DC's the Green Lantern Corps and Marvel's Tagak the Leopard Lord.
- H.E.C.T.O.R. (Highly Evolved Creature Totally Oriented for Revenge). An amalgamation of DC's Hector Hammond and Marvel's MODOK (George Tarleton).
- Rhomann Sur. An amalgamation of DC's Abin Sur and Marvel's Rhomann Dey.
- Madame Sapphire (Pepper Ferris). An amalgamation of DC's Star Sapphire (Carol Ferris) and Marvel's Madame Masque (Giulieta Nefaria a.k.a. Whitney Frost) and Pepper Potts.
- Senator Harrington Ferris. An amalgamation of DC's Carl Ferris and Marvel's Senator Harrington Byrd.
- Happy Kalmaku. An amalgamation of DC's Thomas Kalmaku and Marvel's Happy Hogan.
- Stewart Rhodes. An amalgamation of DC's John Stewart and Marvel's Jim Rhodes.
- The Green Guardsman (Kyle O'Brien). An amalgamation of DC's Green Lantern (Kyle Rayner) and Marvel's the Guardsman (Kevin O'Brien).
- Gardner. An Amalgam Universe version of DC's Guy Gardner.
- Gyrich. An Amalgam Universe version of Marvel's Henry Peter Gyrich.
- The Great White. An amalgamation of DC's the Shark (a.k.a. T. S. Smith and Karshon) and Marvel's Ultimo.
- Mandarinestro. An amalgamation of DC's Sinestro (full name: Thaal Sinestro) and Marvel's the Mandarin (real name unknown).
- Black Brand. An amalgamation of DC's Black Hand (William Derek Hand) and Marvel's Firebrand (Gary Gilbert).
- The Sonicorn. An amalgamation of DC's Sonar (Bito Wladon) and Marvel's the Unicorn (Milos Masaryk).
- Doctor Whiplash. An amalgamation of DC's Doctor Polaris (Neal Emerson) and Marvel's Whiplash (Mark Scarlotti).
- The Lamplight Phantom. An amalgamation of DC's the Lamplighter (Lee Carver) and Marvel's the Night Phantom (Travis Hoyt).
- Olivia Stane. An amalgamation of DC's Olivia Reynolds and Marvel's Obadiah Stane.
- Janice Doremus. An amalgamation of DC's Eve Doremus and Marvel's Janice Cord.
- Sunset Vane. An amalgamation of DC's Iona Vane and Marvel's Sunset Bain.
- Iron Lantern 5700 (Arno Manning). An amalgamation of DC's Pol Manning (an alternate identity used by Hal Jordan in the year A.D. 5700) and Marvel's Iron Man 2020 (Arno Stark).

==== The Magnetic Men featuring Magneto #1 ====
- The Black Vulture. An amalgamation of DC's the Black Condor (Ryan Kendall) and Marvel's the Vulture (Adrian Toomes).
- Chemodam. An amalgamation of DC's Chemo and Marvel's MODAM (Marcella Antonov).
- Deathborg. An amalgamation of DC's Cyborg (Victor Stone) and Marvel's Deathlok the Demolisher (Luther Manning).
- Kultron. An amalgamation of DC's Kobra (Jeffrey Franklin Burr) and Marvel's Ultron.
- Quasimodox. An amalgamation of DC's Vril Dox and Marvel's Quasimodo.
- Soniklaw. An amalgamation of DC's Sonar (Bito Wladon) and Marvel's Klaw the Master of Sound (Ulysses Klaue).
- Vance Cosmic. An amalgamation of DC's Cosmic Boy (Rokk Krinn) and Marvel's Vance Astro (full name: Vance Astrovik).
- Mister Mastermind. An amalgamation of DC's Mister Mind and Marvel's Mastermind (Jason Wyngarde).
- The Impossible Mod. An amalgamation of DC's the Mad Mod (Neil Richards) and Marvel's the Impossible Man.
- Detective Dinosaur. An amalgamation of DC's Detective Chimp (Bobo T. Chimpanzee) and Marvel's Devil Dinosaur.
- Krakoa, the Living Dinosaur Island. An amalgamation of DC's Dinosaur Island and Marvel's Krakoa.
- The Rolling Doors. An amalgamation of the names of the rock and roll groups The Rolling Stones and The Doors.

==== Spider-Boy Team-Up #1 ====
- The Agamotto Empress. An amalgamation of DC's the Emerald Empress (Sarya) with elements of Marvel's the Eye of Agamotto.
- Bouncing Ball. An amalgamation of DC's Bouncing Boy (Chuck Taine) and Marvel's Speedball (Robbie Baldwin).
- Cannonfire. An amalgamation of DC's Wildfire (Drake Burroughs) and Marvel's Cannonball (Sam Guthrie).
- Chameleon. An amalgamation of DC's Chameleon Boy (Reep Daggle) and Marvel's the Chameleon (Dmitri Smerdyakov).
- Darkstar. An amalgamation of DC's Shadow Lass (Tasmia Mallor) and Marvel's Darkstar (Laynia Petrovna).
- Doc Alternity. An amalgamation of DC's Doctor Fate (Kent Nelson) and Marvel's Eternity.
- Dream Date. An amalgamation of DC's Dream Girl (Nura Nal) and Marvel's Destiny (Irene Adler).
- Fantastic Lad. An amalgamation of DC's Elastic Lad (Jimmy Olsen) and Marvel's Mister Fantastic (Reed Richards).
- General Annihilus. An amalgamation of DC's General Zod (full name: Dru-Zod) and Marvel's Annihilus.
- Gideon Jupiter. An amalgamation of DC's Mister Jupiter (full name: Loren Jupiter) and Marvel's Gideon.
- Growing Boy a.k.a. Living Colossus. An amalgamation of DC's Colossal Boy (Gim Allon) and Marvel's It! The Living Colossus.
- Invisible Girl. An amalgamation of DC's Invisible Kid (Lyle Norg) and Marvel's the Invisible Woman (Sue Storm-Richards).
- Kang the Time Conqueror a.k.a. Chronos-Tut the Time Pharaoh. An amalgamation of DC's the Time Trapper and Chronos the Time Thief (David Clinton) and Marvel's Kang the Conqueror (Nathaniel Richards) and Pharaoh Rama-Tut (Nathaniel Richards).
- Lady Bug. An amalgamation of DC's Shrinking Violet (Salu Digby) and Marvel's the Wasp (Janet van Dyne).
- Living Lightning Lad a.k.a. 'Lectron. An amalgamation of DC's Lightning Lad (Garth Ranzz) and Marvel's Electro (Max Dillon) and the Living Lightning (Miguel Santos).
- Living Lightning Lass a.k.a. Sparkler. An amalgamation of DC's Lightning Lass (Ayla Ranzz) and Marvel's the Dazzler (Alison Blaire).
- Manorb. An amalgamation of DC's Mano and Marvel's the Orb (Drake Shannon).
- Martinex 5. An amalgamation of DC's Brainiac 5 (Querl Dox) and Marvel's Martinex (full name: Martinex T'Naga).
- Molecule Lad a.k.a. Nucleus. An amalgamation of DC's Element Lad (Jan Arrah) and Marvel's the Molecule Man (Owen Reece).
- Multiple Maid a.k.a. Myriad. An amalgamation of DC's Triplicate Girl (Luornu Durgo) and Marvel's the Multiple Man (Jamie Madrox).
- Paste-Eater Pete. An amalgamation of DC's Matter-Eater Lad (Tenzil Kem) and Marvel's Paste-Pot Pete (Peter Petruski, later known as the Trapster).
- Phantomcat. An amalgamation of DC's Phantom Girl (Tinya Wazzo) and Marvel's Shadowcat (Kitty Pryde).
- Phoenetix. An amalgamation of DC's Kinetix (Zoë Saugin) and Marvel's Phoenix (Rachel Summers).
- Psi-Girl. An amalgamation of DC's Saturn Girl (Imra Ardeen) and Marvel's Psylocke (Betsy Braddock).
- The Scavulture. An amalgamation of DC's the Scavenger (real name unknown) and Marvel's the Vulture (Adrian Toomes).
  - The Black Diamond Soul Gem. An amalgamation of DC 's the Black Diamond and Marvel's the Soul Gem, one of the six Infinity Gems (the Scavulture was looking for this jewel in order to steal it).
- Shadowstar. An amalgamation of DC's Shadow Lass (Tasmia Mallor) and Marvel's Starhawk (Stakar Ogord).
- Spartacus. An amalgamation of DC's Persuader (Nyeun Chun Ti) and Marvel's the Gladiator (Melvin Potter).
- Spider-Boy 2099 (Mig-El Gand). An amalgamation of DC's Mon-El (Lar Gand) and Marvel's Spider-Man 2099 (Miguel O'Hara).
- Star Charlie a.k.a. Mass. An amalgamation of DC's Star Boy (Thom Kallor) and Marvel's Charlie-27.
- Sun Lord. An amalgamation of DC's Sun Boy (Dirk Morgna) and Marvel's Firelord (Pyreus Kril).
- Tharlock. An amalgamation of DC's Tharok and Marvel's Deathlok the Demolisher (Luther Manning).
- Timberwolf by Night. An amalgamation of DC's Timber Wolf (Brin Londo) and Marvel's the Werewolf by Night (Jack Russell).
- Universe Boy. An amalgamation of DC's Ultra Boy (Jo Nah) and Marvel's Captain Universe.
- Valinus. An amalgamation of DC's Validus (Garridan Ranzz) and Marvel's Terminus.
- Vance Cosmic. An amalgamation of DC's Cosmic Boy (Rokk Krinn) and Marvel's Vance Astro (full name: Vance Astrovik).
- Xcel. An amalgamation of DC's XS (Jenni Ognats) and Marvel's Quicksilver (Pietro Maximoff).
- R. K. Sternsel. An amalgamation of the names of DC's Karl Kesel and Marvel's Roger Stern.

==== Thorion of the New Asgods #1 ====
- Thorion the Hunter. An amalgamation of DC's Orion and Marvel's Thor (full name: Thor Odinson).
  - Don Free (a human identity used by Thorion). An amalgamation of DC's Scott Free and Marvel's Don Blake.
  - Thorion the Celestial (a cosmic being that Thorion evolves into). An amalgamation of DC's Orion and Marvel's Thor (full name: Thor Odinson) and one of the Celestials.
- L'ok D'saad. An amalgamation of DC's DeSaad and Marvel's Loki (full name: Loki Laufeyson).
- Bald'r Lightbringer. An amalgamation of DC's Lightray (Solis) and Marvel's Balder the Brave (full name: Balder Odinson).
- Oberon Foster. An amalgamation of DC's Oberon (full name: Oberon Kurtzberg) and Marvel's Jane Foster.
- Big Sif. An amalgamation of DC's Big Barda and Marvel's Sif.
- Heimron. An amalgamation of DC's Metron and Marvel's Heimdall.
- Infinity the Beta-Ray Man. An amalgamation of DC's Infinity-Man (Drax) and Marvel's Beta Ray Bill.
- Steppenorn the Wolf Queen. An amalgamation of DC's Steppenwolf and Marvel's Karnilla the Norn Queen.
- Granny Gullin the Boar God. An amalgamation of DC's Granny Goodness and Marvel's Gullin the Boar God.
- The Absorbing Bug. An amalgamation of DC's Forager and Marvel's the Absorbing Man (Carl "Crusher" Creel).
- Devilance the Storm-Giant. An amalgamation of DC's Devilance the Pursuer and Marvel's version of one of the Storm Giants from Norse mythology.
- The Enchanted Tigra. An amalgamation of DC's Tigra and Marvel's Amora the Enchantress.

== Teams ==
The All-Star Winners Squadron in Super Soldier: Man of War #1 (June 1997)

- The 100 – First mentioned in Iron Lantern #1.
  An amalgamation of DC's the 100 and Marvel's the Maggia.
  Members: Doctor Whiplash
- The All-Star Winners Squadron – First appeared in Super-Soldier: Man of War #1. Headquarters: Midtown Clubhouse, 1940s Metropolis.
  An amalgamation of DC's the All-Star Squadron and Marvel's the All-Winners Squad.
  Members: the American Belle, the Human Lantern, the Aqua-Mariner, Super-Soldier, the Whiz, "Brooklyn" Barnes (mascot)
- The Brotherhood of Evil Gods – First appeared in Unlimited Access #4.
  An amalgamation of DC's the New Gods of Apokolips and Marvel's the Brotherhood of Evil Mutants.
  Members: Blobba, Disastermind, Kantique, the Red Lash, Sabrebak, Silverlance, Virmin Vundavort
- The Brotherhood of Injustice – First mentioned in JLX #1.
  An amalgamation of DC's the Injustice League and Marvel's the Brotherhood of Evil Mutants.
  Members: Botanique a.k.a. Ms. Tique
  Former members: Runaway
- The Challenger Haters of Evil – First appeared in Challengers of the Fantastic #1.
  An amalgamation of DC's the League of Challenger-Haters and Marvel's the Masters of Evil.
  Members: the Multi-Master, Diablo the Volcano Man, Drabny the Fixer, the Radioactive Kra, Ultivac the Multi-Robot
- The Challengers of the Fantastic – First appeared in Challengers of the Fantastic #1.
  An amalgamation of DC's the Challengers of the Unknown and Marvel's the Fantastic Four.
  Members: Reed "Prof" Richards, Ben "Rocky" Grimm, Johnny "Red" Storm, Susan "Ace" Storm
- Extreme Works – First mentioned in JLX #1.
  An amalgamation of DC's Extreme Justice and Marvel's Force Works.
- The Fantastic Legion – First mentioned in Spider-Boy #1.
  An amalgamation of DC's the Legion of Super-Heroes and Marvel's the Fantastic Four.
- The Female Furies – First appeared in Bullets and Bracelets #1.
  An Amalgam Universe version of DC's the Female Furies.
  Members: Bernadeth, Lashina, Mad Harriet, Stompa
  Former members: Big Titania
- The Frightful Five – First appeared in Spider-Boy Team-Up #1.
  An amalgamation of DC's the Fatal Five and Marvel's the Frightful Four.
  Members: Tharlock, Valinus, Manorb, the Agamotto Empress, Spartacus
- Generation Hex – First appeared in Generation Hex #1.
  An amalgamation of elements of DC's Western comics and Marvel's Generation X.
  Members: Jono Hex, Aurora Trigger, El Papamondo, Johnny Random, Madame Banshee, Nightgate, Northstar Trigger, Pow Wow Boom Boom Smith, Retribution, Skinhunter, Thunderchick – Daughter of Thunderhawk, Thunderhawk, the White Whip
- The Hand – First appeared in Bullets and Bracelets #1.
  An Amalgam Universe version of Marvel's the Hand.
- The Hellfire League of Injustice – First appeared in JLX Unleashed #1.
  An amalgamation of DC's the Injustice League and Marvel's version of the Hellfire Club.
  Members: Savage Shaw, Lord Maxwell Hodge, Dark Firebird, Mistress Maxima
- The Hexions – First mentioned in Generation Hex #1.
  An amalgamation of elements of DC's Western comics and Marvel's the Hellions.
  Members: Madame Banshee
- The Howling Commandos – First appeared in Super-Soldier: Man of War #1.
  An amalgamation of DC's Easy Company and Marvel's the Howling Commandos.
  Members: Sgt. Frank Rock, Wildman Percy, Little Dum Dum, Bulldozer Gabriel, Ice-Cream Cohen, Rebel Farmer, Dino Four-Eyes
- HYDRA – First appeared in Super-Soldier #1.
  An Amalgam Universe version of Marvel's HYDRA.
  Members: the Green Skull (alias Lex Luthor), Madame Cat, Nuke, Deathlok, Baron Zero
- The Imperial Suicide Squad – First mentioned in The Exciting X-Patrol #1.
  An amalgamation of DC's the Suicide Squad and Marvel's the Imperial Guard.
  Members: Amanda Deathbird
- Infinite Kickers, Inc. – First mentioned in Challengers of the Fantastic #1.
  An amalgamation of DC's Infinity, Inc. and Marvel's Kickers, Inc.
- The Judgment League Avengers (JLA) – First appeared in JLX #1.
  An amalgamation of DC's the Justice League of America (JLA) and Marvel's the Avengers.
  Members: Super-Soldier, the Dark Claw, the Speed Demon, Iron Lantern, the Canary, Captain Marvel, Goliath, Hawkeye, the Angelhawk, Thorion the Hunter, the Red Vision, the White Witch, the Blue Jacket, Wonder-Gold
- The Justice League X-Men (JLX) – First appeared in JLX #1.
  An amalgamation of DC's the Justice League of America (JLA) and Marvel's the X-Men.
  Members: Mister X, Apollo, Firebird, the Iceberg, Wonder Woman (a.k.a. Amazon), Runaway, the Aqua-Mariner, Chaos, Mercury, Kokoro, Metamimic
- The Legion of Evil Mutants – First mentioned in X-Patrol #1.
  An amalgamation of DC's the Legion of Super-Villains and Marvel's the Brotherhood of Evil Mutants.
- The Legion of Galactic Guardians 2099 – First appeared in Spider-Boy Team-Up #1.
  An amalgamation of DC's the Legion of Super-Heroes and Marvel's 1969 version of the Guardians of the Galaxy, with elements of Marvel's Marvel 2099 comics.
  Members: Bouncing Ball, Cannonfire, Chameleon, Darkstar, Dream Date, Fantastic Lad, Growing Boy a.k.a. Living Colossus, Invisible Girl, Lady Bug, Living Lightning Lad a.k.a. 'Lectron, Living Lightning Lass a.k.a. Sparkler, Martinex 5, Molecule Lad a.k.a. Nucleus, Multiple Maid a.k.a. Myriad, Paste-Eater Pete, Phantomcat, Phoenetix, Psi-Girl, Shadowstar, Spider-Boy 2099, Star Charlie a.k.a. Mass, Sun Lord, Timberwolf by Night, Universe Boy, Vance Cosmic, Xcel
- The Living Erasers of Qward – First mentioned in Unlimited Access #4.
  An amalgamation of DC's the Weaponers of Qward and Marvel's the Living Eraser.
- The Magnetic Men – First appeared in Magneto and the Magnetic Men #1.
  An amalgamation of DC's the Metal Men and Marvel's the Brotherhood of Evil Mutants.
  Members: Magneto, Cobalt, Iron, Nickel, Bismuth, Antimony
- The Microstar Micronauts – First appeared in The Exciting X-Patrol #1.
  An Amalgam Universe team of which Marvel's part of the amalgamation is the Micronauts. DC's part of the amalgamation is unknown.
- The Mutant Outsiders – First mentioned in Magneto and the Magnetic Men #1.
  An amalgamation of DC's the Outsiders and Marvel's the New Mutants.
  Former members: Kokoro, Haloroma
- The New Western Teen Malform Force – First mentioned in Generation Hex #1.
  An amalgamation of DC's the New Teen Titans and Marvel's X-Force.
  Members: Pow Wow Boom Boom Smith
- The New York Special Crimes Unit – First appeared in Spider-Boy #1. Headquarters: New York, New York.
  An amalgamation of DC's the Metropolis Special Crimes Unit (MSCU) and Marvel's version of the New York Police Department (NYPD).
  Members: Captain Sam Makoa, Roxy Leech, "Flash" Thompson, "Brookyn" Barnes
- The Offending Society – First mentioned in Lobo the Duck #1.
  An amalgamation of DC's the Justice Society of America (JSA) and Marvel's the Defenders (this may be a mangled version of the team's real name on the part of Lobo the Duck, whether it is or not is unknown).
  Members: Doctor Strangefate, the Skulk, Vikki Valkyrie, Hawkhawk, Lobo the Duck
- The Quentin Carnival – First appeared in Speed Demon #1.
  An Amalgam Universe version of Marvel's the Quentin Carnival.
  Members: Blaze Allen (the Speed Demon), the Blob, "the Clown", "the Flying Gambonnos", Miss Miracle, Puck, "the Ringmaster", Wally Allen (Kid Demon)
- The Shadow Guild – First appeared in JLX Unleashed #1.
  An amalgamation of elements of DC's Obsidian and Marvel's the Thieves Guild.
  Members: the Wraith (Todd LeBeau)
- S.H.I.E.L.D. – First appeared in Bruce Wayne: Agent of S.H.I.E.L.D. #1.
  An Amalgam Universe version of Marvel's S.H.I.E.L.D.
  Members: Bruce Wayne, Nick Fury, Dum Dum Dugan, Sgt. Rock, Moonwing, the Black Bat
- The Sinister Society – First appeared in The Magnetic Men featuring Magneto #1.
  An amalgamation of DC's the Secret Society of Super Villains and Marvel's the Sinister Six.
  Members: Kultron, Deathborg, the Black Vulture, Soniklaw, Vance Cosmic, Quasimodox, Chemodam
- Spitfire and the Blackhawks – First mentioned in Challengers of the Fantastic #1.
  An amalgamation of DC's the Blackhawk Squadron and Marvel's Spitfire and the Troubleshooters.
- The Star Brand Corps – First mentioned in Speed Demon #1.
  An amalgamation of DC's the Green Lantern Corps with elements of Marvel's Star Brand comics.
  Members: Hal "Madman" Jordan, Sinestro
- The Super Four – First mentioned in Unlimited Access #4.
  An amalgamation of DC's the Superman Family and Marvel's the Fantastic Four.
- The Super-Weirdies – First mentioned in Unlimited Access #4.
  An amalgamation of DC's the DNAliens and Marvel's the Deviants.
- The Terrible Three – First appeared in Speed Demon #1.
  An amalgamation of DC's the Terrible Trio and Marvel's the Sinister Six.
  Members: the Scarecrow, Siliconman, the Two-Faced Goblin
- The Thunder Crusaders – First mentioned in Challengers of the Fantastic #1.
  An Amalgam Universe combination of DC's versions of the T.H.U.N.D.E.R. Agents and the Mighty Crusaders.
  Members: Dynashield, the No-Fly
- The Un-People – First appeared in Challengers of the Fantastic #1. Headquarters: Super Town, New Asgard.
  An amalgamation of DC's the Forever People and Marvel's the Inhumans.
  Members: Big Gorgon, Dream Crystal, Lockbroot, Medusa Moonrider, Triserinak, Vykin the Black Bolt
- The Weaponers of A.I.M. – First mentioned in Iron Lantern #1.
  An amalgamation of DC's the Weaponers of Qward and Marvel's A.I.M. (Advanced Idea Mechanics).
  Members: H.E.C.T.O.R. (Highly Evolved Creature Totally Oriented for Revenge)
- The X-League of America – First appeared in DC/Marvel: All Access #4, then reappeared in Unlimited Access #4 featuring additional characters.
  An amalgamation of DC's the Justice League of America (JLA) and Young Justice and Marvel's the Avengers and the X-Men.
  Members: Captain America Jr., the Dark Light, Flash Bang, Green Cyclops, Green Goliath, Jean Black, King Ice, the Martian Phoenix, Mutant Man, Quick Freeze, Redwing the Avenging Wonder, Thor-El, Wonder Wasp, Wonder Woman a.k.a. Amazon (an alternate version)
- The X-Patrol – First appeared in X-Patrol #1. Headquarters: the X-Building.
  An amalgamation of DC's the Doom Patrol and the Teen Titans and Marvel's X-Force.
  Members: the Beastling, Ravenyia Dayspring, Niles Cable, Shatterstarfire, Dial H.U.S.K., the Torpedo, Jericho, Ferro Man, Elasti-Girl
- The X-tremists – First mentioned in JLX #1.
  An Amalgam Universe team of which DC's part of the amalgamation is the Extremists. Marvel's part of the amalgamation is unknown.
  Members: Lord Nimrod
- The Young Commandos – First mentioned in Spider-Boy #1.
  An amalgamation of DC's the Boy Commandos and Marvel's the Young Allies.
  Members: "Brooklyn" Barnes
