= List of The American Way characters =

The following are a list of characters that appear in DC Comics' comic book series The American Way, created by John Ridley and Georges Jeanty.

== Characters ==
=== Civil Defense Corps ===
- Amber Waves - Can wield energy that allows her to generate forcefields and other shapes similar to Green Lantern, and fly. On-off girlfriend of Muscle Shoals from the Southern Defense Corps. Her name comes directly from the lyrics to America the Beautiful. She becomes oddly temperamental and aggressive following Freya's death.
- East Coast Intellectual - An old-school pulp character, based on the supergenius archetype embodied by characters like Doc Savage, and modern characters like Will Magnus and Reed Richards. His power is super intelligence.
- Freya - A self-proclaimed Asgardian goddess and Thor analog, who was killed by the villain Hellbent with her own "magic axe". Her sister Skadi, presumably also an Asgardian, shows up for her funeral in the next issue. In actual Norse mythology Skadi was married to Njord and was therefore stepmother to Freya and her brother Frey. Freya's true mother is never named.
- New American - Jason Fisher, an African-American, is given invulnerability and superstrength by the FDAA. His invulnerability comes with a catch: the project left him with the pain receptors of a normal human. According to FDAA scientists he is almost as strong as Muscle Shoals.
- Old Glory - A chain-smoking, sixgun toting patriotic hero, with a faked generational backstory similar to that of Uncle Sam. He dies of a heart attack during a faked fight with Johnny Lau, the villain known as Red Terror.
- Pharos - A mixture of Superman and Captain Marvel due to his powers, costume, and relationship with a female reporter. He is incredibly powerful but plagued by doubt and indecision. The CDC's FDAA handlers have no idea how powerful he really is, or where he got his powers. He has demonstrated flight, invulnerability, heat vision, and a weakness to magic (the wound from Freya's magic axe won't heal). As evidenced by the symbol on his costume, the name Pharos comes from the Lighthouse of Alexandria. His powers are stated to grow everyday, leading to his discovering new ones occasionally. It is implied that he's not human, and may have been both a sixth grader named Nicky Palmer and a Circus Strongman before joining the CDC.
- Secret Agent - Another old-school pulp analog in the vein of G-8 and Operator No. 5, with superhuman reflexes and heightened deductive capabilities. He has also demonstrated an uncanny shooting skill that allows him to predict the path of his ricochets and plan for them. In issue #3 he calls himself a "genetically juiced-up super shooter". He returns in the second series as a domestic intelligence operative named Erskine Wells.
- The Wanderer - An actor named Paul Simms. Simms played The Wanderer from Dimension 8, an alien ally similar to the Martian Manhunter, and wore a special costume and flight pack. He was also used as a test subject for FDAA's inventions, which gave him powers that varied from mission to mission. He later gained telekinetic powers and killed his entire family, before being stopped by the Civil Defense Corps. In the ensuing battle, the New American's faceplate was smashed, and nearby reporters captured it on film.
- X-15 - A loudmouthed racist with a cruel streak, X-15 is a super speedster in the vein of the Flash. He is only interested in his salary, and asks for a pay raise whenever one of his teammates dies. Named after the USAF/USN North American X-15 from the X-plane series of 1960s experimental aircraft.

=== Southern Defense Corps ===
- The Captain - A hero with precognition who looks and acts like Mark Twain. He constantly quotes words of wisdom originally written by Twain, demonstrating a moderate non-racist outlook. He also wears a white suit and always has a smoking pipe. He has no problem with the New American being on the team. His name might be based on a Twain's story "Captain Stormfield's Visit to Heaven", or on "Captain", a term of respect that originated in the regional vocabulary of Southern Louisiana. It is loosely implied by the Captain that he is actually the real Mark Twain.
- Mighty Delta - A racist Superman analog, with super strength, flight and energy vision. Mighty Delta rarely has an opinion of his own, but is led by the strongest personality around him, which in this case is Southern Cross. His name is a reference to the Mississippi Delta.
- Mister Lucky - Luck powers and the ability to charge playing cards with an unknown energy similar to Gambit. Both in design and costume he resembles Clark Gable from Gone with the Wind. Unlike Southern Cross he is a moderate racist. It is loosely implied that he is homosexual.
- Muscle Shoals - An illiterate, kind hearted invulnerable hero with the ability to create and restore plant life. He is the strongest member of the Southern Defense Corps, and possibly the strongest member of the formerly united CDC. Also Amber Waves' on-off boyfriend. He has no problem with the New American being on the team, but is confused by the constant racist rhetoric of those around him. He is named after the city of Muscle Shoals, Alabama.
- Ole Miss - Has the power to turn back local time in order to save the lives of her teammates, but every time she does so, she loses a little over three months from her own life. She has brought Southern Cross back from the dead so many times, that he's cost her a year and a half of her life. She can also permanently age her enemies to dust if she wishes. This use of her powers does not affect her in a detrimental way. She has no problem with the New American being on the team.
- Southern Cross - A powerful southern pyrokinetic and hotheaded racist. He can cover his body in flames and fly. His costume is similar to that of the Human Torch, but is white and black with a Ku Klux Klan cross on it. It is implied throughout the story and by Ole Miss that he is homosexual.

=== Other ===
- Wesley "Wes" Chatham - The protagonist and primary narrator. A former ad man for a car company, he lost his job at the start of the series. He is then hired by his friend Bobby to work with the handlers/managers of the CDC, a secret subdivision of the FDAA. His new job poses ethical dilemmas for him from day one, not the least of which being all the secrecy and lies it entails. At the end of the series, he is appointed head of the CDC.
- Tannis Darling - A female newspaper reporter in the vein of Lois Lane. She has a relationship with Pharos. At several points, she comes close to learning (and revealing) all the secrets of the CDC, though she's never shown going through with it.
- Hellbent - A super-intelligent serial killer, hired assassin and cult leader formerly in the employ of the US government. He goes rogue after killing a bus full of African-American activists, a rogue group of heroes from the CDC (the Secret Agent, Pharos and Freya), track him down with the intent of ending his threat permanently. During the fight he kills Freya with her own magic axe, wounds Pharos' face and chest with the axe, and lops off one of the Agent's hands. He was later tracked down and beaten to death by the New American.
- Red Terror - A Chinese-American actor named Johnny Lau. Lau was employed by the FDAA to play the Red Terror while wearing a special flight pack. After Old Glory's death while fighting him in a mock battle, Lau's paranoid fear that the FDAA was going to kill him and his delusion that he had actual superpowers led him to jump from a rooftop to his untimely death.
- Chet - A CDC handler/manager and implied former head of the organization. He works closely with Wes throughout the series. At some point, he joined forces with Hellbent and began sabotaging the CDC covertly. He is found out at the series' conclusion.
