= List of DMZ characters =

DMZ is an American comic book series set in a near future war-torn New York City that ran for 72 issues from 2005 to 2012. Characters in the story are, for the most part, subjects of either the United States federal government and its corporate affiliates, the rival Free States of America, or natives of the demilitarized zone (DMZ) of Manhattan island.

== Factions ==
=== Free States of America ===
Originally a largely disorganized movement of right wing and anti-federal militias, the FSA has come to seize control of large areas of territory from the U.S. government. The FSA arose out of anger and disillusion following the U.S. government's continual engagement in foreign wars. Before the U.S. had the chance to respond militarily to the threat inside its own borders the FSA had amassed enough support and materials to fight the returning and exhausted U.S. military at Allentown, Pennsylvania to a stand still.

The FSA is revealed to be fighting an asymmetric war employing conventional tactics as well as unconventional ones. The FSA has used money, intimidation and violence to compel state and local government officials to align with their cause. FSA influence is extensive and not fully known, for example a FSA commander which Matty Roth met with claimed that the governing authorities of the neutral city of Chicago to actually be FSA affiliated, capable of flipping at any time and initiating a new front in the war.

Perceived and portrayed as an army of rednecks and backwoods hicks (a label the FSA doesn't seem to mind at times) the FSA is a sophisticated and dangerous force even claiming to have large conventional forces poised to take the DMZ and end the war. The FSA operates on the western side of the Lincoln Tunnel launching its own operations into the DMZ. The flag of the FSA consists of a five-pointed star (like those on the U.S. flag), with a diagonal line splitting the star in half, symbolizing the breakup of the United States of America (it resembles the Bonnie Blue Flag during the First American Civil War by another secessionist regime, the Confederate States).

The penultimate volume of the series, Free States Rising, included several flashbacks which provided more information on how the FSA began, combined with other scattered references in earlier issues. The U.S. had become entangled in numerous and increasingly expensive anti-terrorism campaigns around the globe, decried as "foreign adventurism", until ultimately three quarters of a million U.S. soldiers were deployed fighting on six fronts around the globe (the most recent being the Horn of Africa). These interventions were alternatively described as "three different wars on as many continents". This strained the domestic economy and infrastructure to the point of near-collapse, with domestic spending co-opted to fund these overseas "police actions". Due to massive budget cuts, municipal authorities were forced to abandon entire neighborhoods, with basic utilities, public transit, and 911 services shut down. This reduced vast swaths of major cities to ghost towns, including Detroit, St. Louis, Chicago, Portland, Boston, Miami, and most recently, Richmond. Despite this dire situation, the federal government passes the largest war spending bill in history, devoted entirely to funding the ever-expanding overseas wars. This led to the accusation from much of the country that the military-industrial complex had abandoned the United States's own citizens: even as large portions of major cities were being abandoned due to lack of public utilities, major corporations were actually making record profits from supplying the U.S. military's foreign wars. Protests erupted around a G8 summit held in Phoenix, Arizona, which turned particularly violent. Ultimately, local anti-government militias in Montana started a secessionist movement, which quickly spread to other states - sometimes directly, but frequently other local groups were inspired to spontaneously join in due to the crippling domestic problems and anti-government anger across the country. As explained later in the series, the FSA was not so much a rival nation as an ideology, and had no clear hierarchical leadership. Eventually the anti-government militias coalesced and began to spread eastwards. The same massive budget cuts that the militias were protesting against had also gutted domestic police forces, so they encountered very little opposition. Even National Guard bases were practically undefended due to budget cuts, and considered "ripe for the picking" as the militias began to pick their armories clean of heavy military hardware. The split-star flag of the movement began appearing across the country, and the disparate anti-government forces began calling themselves "the Free States of America". Many bitter and underfunded National Guard units actually began to defect to the FSA rather than fight them, giving a boost to the skill and training level of their forces. The U.S. military was stretched so thinly due to foreign interventions that when what regular forces could be assembled finally faced the FSA militia units in Allentown, Pennsylvania, the FSA actually managed to defeat them. Even the FSA forces were surprised at their own rapid advance. At this point the federal government yanked back all military forces from foreign fronts and redeployed them on U.S. soil to stem the tide of the insurrection. For a time this worked, and the U.S. seemed to be gaining the upper hand, but then on Day 204 U.S. soldiers accidentally gunned down a crowd of unarmed protesters in Manhattan. This caused the U.S. to lose its momentum, and each side settled into a stalemate which lasted for a decade.

Not much is revealed about the state of affairs in the rest of America, but in general, the U.S. government only maintains firm control over New England and Long Island, while everything westward is a warzone of sectarian violence between U.S. and FSA forces. The FSA firmly controls New Jersey and Staten Island, from which it launches its continued pushes to take Manhattan - as the nation's largest city, both sides see controlling New York as a symbol of control over the entire country. Many cities have also apparently declared their official neutrality: it is mentioned that Chicago is officially neutral, though it privately has leanings towards the FSA.

Later in the series the FSA commander and some of his troops assist the newly formed Delgado nation in acquiring a nuclear weapon, in order to put more pressure on the U.S. government (it is later revealed by the FSA commander that the FSA were the true backers behind the formation of Delgado Nation). The strategy eventually ends up working against the FSA though as the U.S. simply uses the event as a pretext to finally go on the offensive into the DMZ. During the offensive the FSA commander is captured (and subsequently executed) while the main conventional army of the FSA is defeated on Manhattan. With one of its leaders dead and the bulk of its army defeated, the FSA movement is finally all but crushed after a decade of civil war. The war officially ends with the U.S. and the FSA signing an armistice.

=== United States ===
The officially-recognized U.S. government has largely lost control or is contending over much of the territory of the United States. From the comic it appears one of the few places the U.S. has complete control is Long Island, where it launches its many offensives into the DMZ. Pushed to the brink by the war, the U.S. possesses a technologically sophisticated and extensive military force capable of meting out serious destruction both against its enemies and the civilians caught in the cross fire. The U.S. has demonstrated that it faces issues of deep corruption and will do anything (or kill anyone) in its efforts to end the war and secure the DMZ. What remains of the United States as a faction is dominated by the military-industrial complex: even five years into the stalemated war with no end in sight, the U.S. government cynically makes open announcements in the press that it is promising massive graft contracts to Trustwell, Inc. and other large corporations for the future reconstruction of New York City.

One of the few remaining advantages the U.S. has is that it still maintains total air superiority against the FSA, which does not have its own rival air force. The FSA, however, simply uses asymmetric warfare tactics in response, drastically decreasing the value of air power geared towards fighting a conventional war.

After the rise of Delgado Nation in the DMZ, and their subsequent acquirement of a nuclear warhead, the United States military detonates a nuclear device of their own in order to frame the newly formed nation and thus give the U.S. a legitimate reason to move into Manhattan and end the war. After a sustained shock and awe bombing campaign on the DMZ the U.S. military finally moves in, fighting their way through both DMZ militias and FSA troops. The U.S. eventually gains control of Manhattan and through both Matty's efforts and the interrogation of the FSA Commander, Parco Delgado is captured. While the U.S. gains the upper hand in the conflict, Matty discovers the cover-up used to justify the U.S. offensive and uses evidence of it to blackmail the U.S. government into pardoning the life of Parco Delgado in exchange for Matty's own silence on his knowledge of the nuclear detonation (a deal in which Matty directly negotiates with the U.S. President himself). With the truth of the cover-up sealed, the United States is finally able to both secure the DMZ and defeat the FSA Army, thus finally ending the Second American Civil War. The war officially concludes with the signing of an armistice between the U.S. and the FSA.

=== Trustwell Inc. ===
Trustwell Inc. is a private military contractor that operates throughout the DMZ under contract from the U.S. government. Ruthless and amoral, Trustwell has been shown to kill civilians, fund terrorism, torture and manipulate events to ensure that its role (and profits) in the DMZ only expands.

Following Parco Delgado's election, Trustwell has withdrawn much of its official presence but hundreds of its agents remain within the DMZ, stranded and desperate. When the war concludes, Trustwell ensures that they can continue their involvement in the DMZ through a rebranded construction company.

=== DMZ militias ===
Largely formed out of the need for DMZ residents to defend their neighborhoods, the militias protect certain areas while fighting with one another for territory. When the initial FSA offensive reached Manhattan there was a mass evacuation of the island, but in many ways it was botched and several hundred thousand residents remain trapped in the city. After five full years of the island being reduced to a "demilitarized zone" - a major front in the war with sporadic flareups - these local militias have carved out their own enclaves in different parts of what used to be a thriving metropolis. Some are loyal to the FSA, others to the US, and there is an ongoing proxy conflict between them. Many militias, however, are loyal to no side but their own, feeling abandoned by the outside world - equally blaming the FSA for starting the war, and the U.S. government for the massive corruption that led to the FSA's creation in the first place, and their continued lack of concern for their well-being.

Militias are always hostile to incursions from the U.S. or FSA military and will attack anything or any person they deem a threat.

=== Wilson's Triads ===
A dominant criminal organization operating out of and zealously guarding Chinatown, mostly apolitical and generally stays out of conflicts. However, the Triads do exert significant influence on the events within the DMZ such as providing Parco Delgado with a portion of gold left behind before the conflict so he could finance his acquisition of a nuclear weapon. The U.S. government tries to pay Wilson to surrender before the bombing campaign near the end of the war. Wilson refuses their demands to leave Chinatown but allows his people to evacuate to safety. He is killed in the ensuing airstrikes, becoming a martyr to the people of Chinatown for protecting them throughout the war.

=== Delgado Nation ===
Supporters of Parco Delgado. Part political party, part militia group which Matty Roth became extensively involved with. After the election of Parco Delgado to "governor of the DMZ" they extended their control to large areas of Manhattan. Delgado's government "evicted" US, FSA and Trustwell forces from the DMZ on his first day, but has maintained ties with FSA officials. The government raised the ire of the U.S. after acquiring a nuclear weapon, which caused the U.S. to deploy forces throughout the DMZ to search for it.

The U.S. detonated a nuclear device to destroy the Delgado's weapon hidden at the Indian Point Nuclear facility, then blamed the act on the Delgado Nation and used it as a pretext to attack the group. The Nation was left in disarray following U.S. strikes and the disappearance of Parco Delgado.

=== Central Park Ghosts ===
Small group of ex-US and FSA soldiers led by Soames who protect what little is left of Central Park. The group has had an important role in DMZ affairs supplying Parco Delgado with a nuclear weapon. Following the nuclear detonation, most of the group and Central Park was destroyed by U.S. reprisals. Their leader Soames is revealed to have survived the bombardment but his mind has completely collapsed into madness and Central Park is left a toxic scar on the city.

=== Fur Hat Militia ===
A distinctive militia group whose members wear a fur hat and gas mask in the DMZ to conceal their identities, the group's main objective seems to cause as much destruction and mayhem to the settlements in the DMZ as possible, randomly killing anything that moves. Not much is known about the group initially. They operated out of the damaged, but still standing, Empire State Building.

It is later revealed in the "No Future" story arc that most, if not all, of them were once members of the New York City police and fire departments. As emergency services they desperately tried and failed to maintain order as city and the nation fell apart, only to see it destroyed by the very people they were trying to protect. Many of their families were also killed in the process. Now they consider themselves an army of dead men, refocusing their anguish over the fall of the city by exacting bitter vengeance on those still fighting in the ruins. They equally hate and attack both FSA and U.S. forces and allied street gangs: the FSA for starting the war, and the U.S. forces for allowing the FSA to happen in the first place. As many of them were formerly members of the police force they are very well organized, functioning like a small professional army, coordinating their attacks with scouts and calling in reinforcements by radio. The militia is described as in many ways a death cult, its members holding routine group therapy sessions instead of prayer, operating in shifts and severing all contact with the outside world.

At the end of the war many returned to larger society while others committed suicide. One lone member remained behind at the conclusion of the war.

== Individual characters ==
=== Matthew (Matty) Roth ===
The protagonist of the series, Matthew (Matty) Roth, begins the story as a naïve photo journalism intern for the fictional Liberty News Network, a part of Viktor Ferguson's crew entering the DMZ for the first time to report on the conditions of the war-torn United States. While landing in Manhattan, Matty is left stranded in the DMZ when the crew are attacked by local militia. In the chaos and confusion, Matty meets Zee who treats his wounds and acts as his reluctant guardian and guide in the DMZ. Being the only source of news coming out of the DMZ, Matty unintentionally becomes a national and international celebrity — an advantage and a curse. Matty's reporting elevates his position in the DMZ and he becomes extensively involved with the government of Parco Delgado. His involvement with the government and his actions with them ultimately has dire consequences for himself and the DMZ. Matty becomes heavily involved with Parco and his government and helps facilitate the transfer of a nuclear weapon into Parco's control. As Matty amasses more power in Parco's government he gains control of his own special military unit that he uses to kill Parco's opponents. After being assaulted by U.S. troops in the city, Matty orders his unit to hunt down and kill the soldiers but mistakenly ends up causing the death of a large group of civilians. After the detonation of the nuclear weapon at Indian Point and the collapse of the Delgado nation, Matty becomes persona non grata and lives in exile in the northern part of the city. Matty racked with guilt over his actions with Parco eventually accepts responsibility for his actions and resumes his role as a reporter in the closing stages of the war. During the final U.S. offensive Matty is able to obtain evidence that proves that the U.S. was behind the nuclear detonation at Indian Point as well as finding the location of Parco. Matty uses that knowledge to make a bargain with the U.S. President to spare Parco's life in exchange to keep the information concealed, in order to allow the U.S. to maintain their moral high ground and conclude the war. At the end of the war Matty is brought up on charges of crimes against humanity, the U.S. government using his actions in the DMZ and as a member of the Delgado government against him. Still regretful over his actions as a member of Parco's government he admits guilt to all the charges and is sentenced to life in prison. The series concludes with Matty giving instructions to the prison transport on the best route so he could get one final look at a recovering New York City.

=== Zee Hernandez ===
Prior to the War, Zee was a medical student working at the local hospitals in downtown Manhattan. In the days leading up the U.S. Army's confrontation with the Free Armies, Zee tended to the victims of the various bombings that occurred around New York City. When the U.S. government evacuated Manhattan, Zee remained behind to help tend to the hundreds of thousands left behind in the conflict. Zee, like all of the residents of Manhattan, adapted to the new harsh reality of life in the DMZ. Hard, street-wise and highly suspicious of people outside of the DMZ, Zee does her best to aid the people of Manhattan, including responding to the various bombings and US/Free Army incursions into the city while making regular visits to the local clinics set up around the city. Zee was initially distrusting of Matty, believing him to merely be a tourist in the DMZ. However, as Matty's role as a reporter grows in the DMZ the initial distrust gives way to a strong friendship and relationship. However, that relationship is nearly destroyed as a consequence of Matty's actions as a member of Parco Delgado's government.

=== Wilson ===
A Chinese immigrant, Wilson runs Chinatown and is a confidant to Matty. Wilson frequently checks Matty's new gear for surveillance bugs, in exchange for the goods Matty doesn't want. He is a former enforcer who gained notoriety at the start of the war. His power and prestige grow greatly during the war and he is considered the de facto leader and protector of Chinatown, helping to maintain its independence and identity in the chaos of the war. In the final stages of the war as the U.S. launches its bombing campaign, Wilson opts to stay but is given one final massive display of respect by the citizens before they evacuate. He is killed by the U.S. bombing.

=== Parco Delgado ===
A native of Manhattan, Parco is the charismatic populist governor of the DMZ. Described as having qualities of Hugo Chavez and other populist leaders, Parco emerged as a candidate in opposition to the handpicked candidates of the U.S. and FSA. Parco's refusal to be a pawn for U.S. or FSA interests may have been a cause of his attempted assassination. Parco has been criticized as merely a gangster making a grab at legitimate power but he remains very popular in the DMZ. Matty became heavily involved with Parco in both his campaign and government. Matty fearing and resenting that his role in Delgado's government was being marginalized, demanded after securing a nuclear weapon for Parco a greater role in his government. The seizure of a nuclear weapon made Parco and his movement a U.S. target. After the "detonation" of the weapon (actually the detonation of a U.S. weapon made to look like Parco's) provided the U.S. with the pretext and support to initiate a final offensive in the DMZ, Parco disappeared and his organization collapsed. Parco was revealed by the FSA commander to be in hiding with the information proving the U.S. was behind the nuclear detonation. It is also revealed that Parco and his government was a ploy by the FSA to gain an ally in the DMZ that would help them end the war. Parco is eventually captured by the US, but as a result of a deal made by Matty Roth, he is only subject to a mock execution and instead goes into exile.

=== The FSA Commander ===
A calm and brilliant tactician who commands the FSA forces in the Jersey area. Throughout the series he is seen leading and carrying out schemes and operations into the DMZ in order to discredit and hamper the U.S. government’s war effort. The Commander uses or manipulates Matty during some of these schemes, mostly as a mediator to bring the demands of the FSA to the attention of the U.S. government. In the “Free States Rising” story arc it is revealed he was once a gun runner who joined the FSA to clear his record. He then quickly raised through the FSA ranks and gained a strong sense of loyalty to the movement after he personally planned and executed the capture of The Holland Tunnel during the early stages of the war. Near the end of the war, the commander points Matty Roth to the location of Parco and the information he has on the nuke. He is eventually captured by the U.S. and thinks he's made a deal with them that will save him but is instead unceremoniously shot in the head by U.S. agents while asking for a ride back to New Jersey.

== Sources ==
- Irvine, Alex (2008). "DMZ". In Dougall, Alastair (ed.). The Vertigo Encyclopedia. New York: Dorling Kindersley. pp. 58–60. ISBN 0-7566-4122-5. OCLC 213309015.
