= List of Metal Men members =

This is a list of fictional characters from DC Comics who are members of the Metal Men.

Overview of Metal Men members
| Hero\Member | First appearance | Description |
|---|---|---|
| Will Magnus | Showcase #37 (April 1962) | Will "Doc" Magnus is the creator of the Metal Men, and one of the world's foremost authorities on robotic engineering. Throughout his career, he has also been an associate of the Doom Patrol, a member of the Science Squad, and an advisor on the White House presidential cabinet. |
| Gold | Showcase #37 (April 1962) | Created by Will Magnus. Gold is the field leader of the Metal Men. |
| Iron | Showcase #37 (April 1962) | Created by Will Magnus. Calm, focused and a dependable member of the Metal Men. |
| Lead | Showcase #37 (April 1962) | Created by Will Magnus. Nice guy of the Metal Men, who despite his big size has a gentle attitude when it comes to other people. |
| Mercury | Showcase #37 (April 1962) | Created by Will Magnus. Member of the Metal Men team who has a hostile and prideful personality, but who is nonetheless heroic and good-natured. |
| Platinum | Showcase #37 (April 1962) | Created by Will Magnus. Platinum, also known as Tina, is the first female member of the Metal Men and has a romantic attraction to Gold and Will Magnus despite being a robot. |
| Tin | Showcase #37 (April 1962) | Created by Will Magnus. The shy member of the Metal Men who has self-confidence issues, but always springs into action in spite of his doubts. |
| Doc Robot | Metal Men #2 (July 1963) | The Robots of Terror are duplicates of the Metal Men built by Doc Robot, himself a robotic duplicate of Will Magnus created by Platinum. Platinum created him when she was fed up of being rejected by Magnus, and built herself a more attentive duplicate. Something short-circuited in the process, and Doc decided to make its own set of Metal Men and attack humanity. The real Magnus and the Metal Men battle one of the robots each and mutually destroy each other. Platinum takes the Doc Robot and Plutonium robots to the Moon, where Plutonium is detonated. |
| Aluminum | Metal Men #2 (July 1963) | |
| Barium | Metal Men #2 (July 1963) | |
| Calcium | Metal Men #2 (July 1963) | |
| Plutonium | Metal Men #2 (July 1963) | |
| Sodium | Metal Men #2 (July 1963) | |
| Zirconium | Metal Men #2 (July 1963) | |
| Platinum | Metal Men #3 (August–September 1963) | An unsuccessful recreation of Platinum. |
| Agantha | The Brave and the Bold #55 (September 1964) | When Uranium is accidentally reactivated, he builds a "female" partner, Agantha (silver). She and Uranium destroy the Metal Men and force Doc Magnus to build a Death Ray. When the Atom undoes the effect of Uranium's weapon, Platinum battles and destroys Agantha. |
| Uranium | The Brave and the Bold #55 (September 1964) | Uranium, one of the first robots created by Will Magnus, comes back to battle the Metal Men, who team up with the Atom to defeat him. |
| Copper | Metal Men #9 (September 1964) | Introduced in the one-page excerpt "Metal Facts and Fancies", Copper was alloyed with Tin to make Bronze. Copper and Bronze did not appear until 2007, when Copper was reintroduced as a full-fledged member of the Metal Men. |
| Nameless | Metal Men #13 (May 1965) | Nameless is a robot created by Tin to be his girlfriend. Having no name, she officially took "Nameless" as her own. At first rejected by the other Metal Men, Nameless officially joined the team after helping them on a mission. After several adventures, Nameless asked Magnus to rebuild her into something beautiful; but something went wrong and Nameless was badly burned. Years later, Batman finds Nameless imprisoned by Platinum Man and frees her. Nameless and Tin get married. However, a Missile Man working with Platinum Man attacks them right after the wedding ceremony is over. Nameless sacrifices herself to save her friends and is destroyed in an explosion. |
| Cobalt | Metal Men #31 (May 1968) | Will Magnus created the Second Metal Men with the following analogues: Cobalt is the strong counterpart to Iron; Gallium is a temperamental liquid, similar to Mercury; Iridia (short for Iridium) is a beautiful and rare metal, like Platinum; Osmium is the only element denser than Lead; Silver is the team leader and equivalent to Gold; Zinc is the analogue for Tin |
| Gallium | Metal Men #31 (May 1968) | Will Magnus created the Second Metal Men with the following analogues: Cobalt is the strong counterpart to Iron; Gallium is a temperamental liquid, similar to Mercury; Iridia (short for Iridium) is a beautiful and rare metal, like Platinum; Osmium is the only element denser than Lead; Silver is the team leader and equivalent to Gold; Zinc is the analogue for Tin |
| Iridia | Metal Men #31 (May 1968) | Will Magnus created the Second Metal Men with the following analogues: Cobalt is the strong counterpart to Iron; Gallium is a temperamental liquid, similar to Mercury; Iridia (short for Iridium) is a beautiful and rare metal, like Platinum; Osmium is the only element denser than Lead; Silver is the team leader and equivalent to Gold; Zinc is the analogue for Tin |
| Osmium | Metal Men #31 (May 1968) | Will Magnus created the Second Metal Men with the following analogues: Cobalt is the strong counterpart to Iron; Gallium is a temperamental liquid, similar to Mercury; Iridia (short for Iridium) is a beautiful and rare metal, like Platinum; Osmium is the only element denser than Lead; Silver is the team leader and equivalent to Gold; Zinc is the analogue for Tin |
| Silver | Metal Men #31 (May 1968) | Will Magnus created the Second Metal Men with the following analogues: Cobalt is the strong counterpart to Iron; Gallium is a temperamental liquid, similar to Mercury; Iridia (short for Iridium) is a beautiful and rare metal, like Platinum; Osmium is the only element denser than Lead; Silver is the team leader and equivalent to Gold; Zinc is the analogue for Tin |
| Zinc | Metal Men #31 (May 1968) | Will Magnus created the Second Metal Men with the following analogues: Cobalt is the strong counterpart to Iron; Gallium is a temperamental liquid, similar to Mercury; Iridia (short for Iridium) is a beautiful and rare metal, like Platinum; Osmium is the only element denser than Lead; Silver is the team leader and equivalent to Gold; Zinc is the analogue for Tin |
| Gold Girl | Metal Men #32 (July 1968) | Will Magnus created the Metal Women as the Metal Men wished that they had girlfriends, just like Tin had Nameless, but they are more independently minded than the Metal Men had hoped for. Additionally, Platinum wished for a boyfriend to take her mind and feelings off of Doc Magnus at the same time. The Metal Women, along with Nameless, prove themselves to the Metal Men by destroying a runaway robot tank. The tank was the forerunner of invading Robot Amazons, who lure the Metal Men into a trap. The Metal Women defeat the Amazon Robots, but a lava vein opens; the Metal Women sacrifice themselves to save the Metal Men. |
| Iron Girl | Metal Men #32 (July 1968) | |
| Lead Girl | Metal Men #32 (July 1968) | |
| Mercury Girl | Metal Men #32 (July 1968) | |
| Platinum Man | Metal Men #32 (July 1968) | |
| Plutonium Man | Metal Men #45 (April–May 1976) | A rogue Metal Man created by Doc Magnus, but taken over by a Karnian agent for nefarious reasons. |
| Tungsten | Doom Patrol (vol. 2) #60 (October 1992) | Created by Will Magnus. Tungsten and Magnus assist the Doom Patrol in combating the Candlemaker, who destroys Tungsten in battle. |
| Tantalum | Silver Age Secret Files #1 (July 2000) | Helper robot created by Will Magnus for his School of Robots. |
| Copper | Superman/Batman #34 (April 2007) | When the team moved to Illinois, Copper was treated as the new member of the team. The other Metal Men and Doc Magnus often forgot she existed and could never remember her name. Copper constantly sucks up to Gold, the team leader, even when no one else takes him seriously. She has feelings for him, much to the disgust of Platinum. |
| Fermium | Metal Men (vol. 3) #3 (November 2007) | The Death Metal Men, were created by Will Magnus' brother David Magnus during a time travel incident to stop a terrible future coming true where the Metal Men cause a worldwide catastrophe. Luckily, they were changed back to normal when Will used a device called "Particularium" to restore them to their original forms. |
| Lithium | Metal Men (vol. 3) #3 (November 2007) | The Death Metal Men, were created by Will Magnus' brother David Magnus during a time travel incident to stop a terrible future coming true where the Metal Men cause a worldwide catastrophe. Luckily, they were changed back to normal when Will used a device called "Particularium" to restore them to their original forms. |
| Polonium | Metal Men (vol. 3) #3 (November 2007) | The Death Metal Men, were created by Will Magnus' brother David Magnus during a time travel incident to stop a terrible future coming true where the Metal Men cause a worldwide catastrophe. Luckily, they were changed back to normal when Will used a device called "Particularium" to restore them to their original forms. |
| Radium | Metal Men (vol. 3) #3 (November 2007) | The Death Metal Men, were created by Will Magnus' brother David Magnus during a time travel incident to stop a terrible future coming true where the Metal Men cause a worldwide catastrophe. Luckily, they were changed back to normal when Will used a device called "Particularium" to restore them to their original forms. |
| Strontium | Metal Men (vol. 3) #3 (November 2007) | The Death Metal Men, were created by Will Magnus' brother David Magnus during a time travel incident to stop a terrible future coming true where the Metal Men cause a worldwide catastrophe. Luckily, they were changed back to normal when Will used a device called "Particularium" to restore them to their original forms. |
| Thorium | Metal Men (vol. 3) #3 (November 2007) | The Death Metal Men, were created by Will Magnus' brother David Magnus during a time travel incident to stop a terrible future coming true where the Metal Men cause a worldwide catastrophe. Luckily, they were changed back to normal when Will used a device called "Particularium" to restore them to their original forms. |
| Uranium | Metal Men (vol. 3) #3 (November 2007) | The Death Metal Men, were created by Will Magnus' brother David Magnus during a time travel incident to stop a terrible future coming true where the Metal Men cause a worldwide catastrophe. Luckily, they were changed back to normal when Will used a device called "Particularium" to restore them to their original forms. |
| Aluminum | Legends of Tomorrow #4 (August 2016) | In The New 52 timeline, when Will Magnus was working for the military and created the Metal Men for them to use as weapons, Magnus quickly escaped their clutches along with the Metal Men to freedom. Determined to get the Metal Men back, the military created their own Metal Men based on Magnus' work as the All-New Metal Men to recapture the original Metal Men. All except Copper were destroyed. |
| Copper | Legends of Tomorrow #4 (August 2016) | In The New 52 timeline, when Will Magnus was working for the military and created the Metal Men for them to use as weapons, Magnus quickly escaped their clutches along with the Metal Men to freedom. Determined to get the Metal Men back, the military created their own Metal Men based on Magnus' work as the All-New Metal Men to recapture the original Metal Men. All except Copper were destroyed. |
| Lithium | Legends of Tomorrow #4 (August 2016) | In The New 52 timeline, when Will Magnus was working for the military and created the Metal Men for them to use as weapons, Magnus quickly escaped their clutches along with the Metal Men to freedom. Determined to get the Metal Men back, the military created their own Metal Men based on Magnus' work as the All-New Metal Men to recapture the original Metal Men. All except Copper were destroyed. |
| Magnesium | Legends of Tomorrow #4 (August 2016) | In The New 52 timeline, when Will Magnus was working for the military and created the Metal Men for them to use as weapons, Magnus quickly escaped their clutches along with the Metal Men to freedom. Determined to get the Metal Men back, the military created their own Metal Men based on Magnus' work as the All-New Metal Men to recapture the original Metal Men. All except Copper were destroyed. |
| Silicon | Legends of Tomorrow #4 (August 2016) | In The New 52 timeline, when Will Magnus was working for the military and created the Metal Men for them to use as weapons, Magnus quickly escaped their clutches along with the Metal Men to freedom. Determined to get the Metal Men back, the military created their own Metal Men based on Magnus' work as the All-New Metal Men to recapture the original Metal Men. All except Copper were destroyed. |
| Zirconium | Legends of Tomorrow #4 (August 2016) | In The New 52 timeline, when Will Magnus was working for the military and created the Metal Men for them to use as weapons, Magnus quickly escaped their clutches along with the Metal Men to freedom. Determined to get the Metal Men back, the military created their own Metal Men based on Magnus' work as the All-New Metal Men to recapture the original Metal Men. All except Copper were destroyed. |
| Fluorine | Metal Men Volume 4 #7 (August, 2020) | The Metal Mammals were created as a replacement team modeled after animals when the Metal Men left Will Magnus. Fluorine is based on a king cobra, Helium a hawk, Neon a tiger, Nitrogen a bear, Oxygen a wolf, Rusty a dog, and Xenon a gorilla. Their first showing is impressive, as they easily defeat Z-1 and his Missile Men. However, the Metal Mammals are destroyed by Chemo in their next battle. |
| Helium | Metal Men Volume 4 #7 (August, 2020) | The Metal Mammals were created as a replacement team modeled after animals when the Metal Men left Will Magnus. Fluorine is based on a king cobra, Helium a hawk, Neon a tiger, Nitrogen a bear, Oxygen a wolf, Rusty a dog, and Xenon a gorilla. Their first showing is impressive, as they easily defeat Z-1 and his Missile Men. However, the Metal Mammals are destroyed by Chemo in their next battle. |
| Neon | Metal Men Volume 4 #7 (August, 2020) | The Metal Mammals were created as a replacement team modeled after animals when the Metal Men left Will Magnus. Fluorine is based on a king cobra, Helium a hawk, Neon a tiger, Nitrogen a bear, Oxygen a wolf, Rusty a dog, and Xenon a gorilla. Their first showing is impressive, as they easily defeat Z-1 and his Missile Men. However, the Metal Mammals are destroyed by Chemo in their next battle. |
| Nitrogen | Metal Men Volume 4 #7 (August, 2020) | The Metal Mammals were created as a replacement team modeled after animals when the Metal Men left Will Magnus. Fluorine is based on a king cobra, Helium a hawk, Neon a tiger, Nitrogen a bear, Oxygen a wolf, Rusty a dog, and Xenon a gorilla. Their first showing is impressive, as they easily defeat Z-1 and his Missile Men. However, the Metal Mammals are destroyed by Chemo in their next battle. |
| Oxygen | Metal Men Volume 4 #7 (August, 2020) | The Metal Mammals were created as a replacement team modeled after animals when the Metal Men left Will Magnus. Fluorine is based on a king cobra, Helium a hawk, Neon a tiger, Nitrogen a bear, Oxygen a wolf, Rusty a dog, and Xenon a gorilla. Their first showing is impressive, as they easily defeat Z-1 and his Missile Men. However, the Metal Mammals are destroyed by Chemo in their next battle. |
| Rusty | Metal Men Volume 4 #7 (August, 2020) | The Metal Mammals were created as a replacement team modeled after animals when the Metal Men left Will Magnus. Fluorine is based on a king cobra, Helium a hawk, Neon a tiger, Nitrogen a bear, Oxygen a wolf, Rusty a dog, and Xenon a gorilla. Their first showing is impressive, as they easily defeat Z-1 and his Missile Men. However, the Metal Mammals are destroyed by Chemo in their next battle. |
| Xenon | Metal Men Volume 4 #7 (August, 2020) | The Metal Mammals were created as a replacement team modeled after animals when the Metal Men left Will Magnus. Fluorine is based on a king cobra, Helium a hawk, Neon a tiger, Nitrogen a bear, Oxygen a wolf, Rusty a dog, and Xenon a gorilla. Their first showing is impressive, as they easily defeat Z-1 and his Missile Men. However, the Metal Mammals are destroyed by Chemo in their next battle. |
