= List of Justice Society of America enemies =

This is a list of fictional characters from DC Comics who are or have been enemies of the Justice Society of America. In chronological order (with issue and date of first appearance).

== Golden Age ==
Villain	First appearance	Description
Ultra-Humanite	Action Comics #13 (June 1939)	Pre-Crisis, the body-hopping Ultra-Humanite was the first recurring nemesis to Superman (a precursor, and perhaps the inspiration, to Lex Luthor). His original body was that of a bald crippled scientist, but his most well-known body is that of an albino ape. However, he progressed to being one of the most consistent and dangerous opponents to the JSA, and even caused the death of Johnny Thunder. He is a member of the Time Stealers.
Wotan	More Fun Comics #55 (May 1940)	The nemesis of Doctor Fate and a powerful sorcerer, Wotan's ire fell on the Society several times and even the Justice League.
Kulak	All Star Comics #2 (Fall 1940)	Arguably the Spectre's nemesis, Kulak is an ancient, powerful three-eyed sorcerer from the planet Brztal.
Greenheads	All Star Comics #55	A race of greenheaded aliens who invade Jupiter and force the inhabitants to help them invade the Solar System. Professor Elwood Napier finds a way to make a spaceship, but is kidnapped by them and a hypno-helmet used to make him try to invade the System. The aliens try and destroy the Earth using a huge cannon, and place most of the JSA under their control with the hypno-helmets, but Green Lantern is able to free the group by knocking of the helmets. The JSA are able to defeat them, and the cannon, when fired, instead destroys the Green Star, the Greenheads base.
Ian Karkull	More Fun Comics #69 (August 1941)	Seeking the powers of darkness, Ian Karkull built a machine fusing science and magic that turned him into living shadow. An early opponent of Dr. Fate, one confrontation Karkull had with the Society led to his believed demise where part of his essence was infused in the heroes presents stunting their aging (one of the explanations for their youth despite their elder age). Further, it was his energies infused in Alan Scott that gave rise to the powers wielded by the hero's son Obsidian.
Adolf Hitler	Green Lantern vol. 1 #3 (Spring 1942)	Leader of the Third Reich and part of the Axis powers, Hitler declared war on the world and used the Spear of Destiny and Holy Grail to erect the Sphere of Influence over much of Europe and Asia. This Sphere would make anyone vulnerable to magic that entered it loyal to the Axis, preventing the majority of Earth's heroes from becoming involved in the greater part of World War II.
Thor	Adventure Comics #75 (June 1942)	"Fairy Tales" Fenton was an enemy of the Sandman that used his knowledge of science to build a body suit and hammer that replicated the mythical Thor that went on to menace the All-Star Squadron.
Thor	All-Star Comics 80-Page Giant #1 (September 1999)	The Norse God of Thunder summoned by Hitler to slay the leaders of the Allied powers.
Black Dragon Society	All Star Comics #12 (August 1942)	A group of Japanese spies and saboteurs who went after a group of Allied scientists and stole their inventions. The JSA stopped their planned attacks on the JSA, and after Johnny accidentally found their base and the Thunderbolt summoned their other members they were captured.
Benito Mussolini	Wonder Woman #2 (September 1942)	Prime Minister of Italy and leader of the National Fascist Party that formed an alliance with the Third Reich when it appeared to Mussolini that Hitler's forces would win World War II.
Hans Goobsten	All-Star Comics #13 (October 1942)	A Nazi scientist who tries to destroy the JSA after Hitler orders him to. His agents pump gas into their meeting room, then load the unconscious heroes into rockets and send them to different planets in the Solar System. However, they each overcome some menace to the natives, are given something to help the War effort and get back to Earth, where they defeat the agents.
Vandal Savage	Green Lantern vol. 1 #10 (Winter 1943)	When caveman Vandar Adg was bathed in the radiation of a meteorite thousands of years ago, it provides him a superior intellect and nigh-immortality. He has manipulated history to his advantage, assassinating Caesar, advising Napoleon, and committing murders as Jack the Ripper. Savage has battled heroes all throughout history, including Immortal Man (who also gained similar gifts from the meteorite) and the Hawk avatar, he crossed swords with the Green Lantern while working with the Nazis, before becoming one of the most frequent threats to face the JSA, and one of the founding members of the Injustice Society.
Brain Wave	All Star Comics #15 (February–March 1943)	An immensely powerful psionic that repeatedly faced the JSA, and was a founding member of the Injustice Society until his death. However, even in death, he remained a threat when his abilities were passed onto his son who went insane and took on a malevolent persona.
Hideki Tōjō	World's Finest Comics #9 (March 1943)	Prime Minister of Japan under Emperor Hirohito, Tōjō led his country's forces as the Army Minister into Asia and against the United States, England, and Holland after Japan joined the Axis Powers. As the war progressed, he would also become Home Minister, Foreign Minister, Education Minister, Commerce Minister, and Chief of the Imperial Japanese Army General Staff. It was the attack on Pearl Harbor that brought the US into the World War II conflict. Finally, he was captured and executed.
King Bee (Elmer Pane)	All-Star Comics #18 (August 1943)	A scientist who uses hormones to make super-insect men, with which he tries to commit crimes. However, the JSA foil the crimes, and restore the transformed super-insects.
Black Barax	Sensation Comics #28 (April 1944)	An enemy of a time traveling Mister Terrific, the Black Barax was a warlord in 7532 AD who came to the past to destroy Tylerco before it discovered the means for time travel.
The Monster	All Star Comics #20 (Spring 1944)	The disembodied brother of Jason Rogers, Monster could possess his sibling turning him into a super strong and highly durable form living up to his name. Dying in a battle with the Society, he would be plucked from time by Per Degaton alongside King Bee, Professor Zodiac, Sky Pirate, Solomon Grundy, and Wotan to battle the Society in the past and change the events of Pearl Harbor.
Gambler	Green Lantern #12 (Summer 1944)	A foe of the Green Lantern, master of disguise, knives and guns, and founding member of the Injustice Society, Steven Sharpe III would later battle the JSA on his own. He committed suicide after losing his money to a corrupt casino, but his daughter took his name.
Solomon Grundy	All-American Comics #61 (October 1944)	A super-strong swamp elemental pseudo-zombie born in Slaughter Swamp outside Gotham City created from the body of murdered merchant Cyrus Gold, he would face Green Lantern, as wood in his body gave him resistance to the Lantern's ring, before becoming a frequent opponent to the Justice Society and League, often destroyed but returning to some semblance of reanimation. Over the years he absorbed some of Green Lantern's power. Sometimes, Grundy would return different, such as a childlike being that followed around Jade or a gentlemanly intellectual that tried to attain true immortality using Amazo.
Wizard	All Star Comics #34 (March 1945)	Originally an illusionist who learned his skills in Tibet before murdering his teacher, a monk, the Wizard attempted to join the JSA when he believed they were secretly villains using their image to deceive the public. After they foiled his crimes, he pretended to commit suicide by leaping into a vat of acid, but the vat was an illusion. He would go on to form the Injustice Society, leading the first two incarnations, and Crime Champions, lead a version of the Secret Society of Super-Villains, and eventually came to possess actual magical abilities.
Psycho-Pirate	All-Star Comics #23 (Winter 1945)	Charles Halstead plotted crimes based on emotions and came into conflict with the Society.
Psycho-Pirate	Showcase #56 (May–June 1965)	Coming into possession of the Medusa Mask, Roger Hayden develops the ability to manipulate emotions and alter perception.
Black Adam	The Marvel Family # 1 (December 1945)	A champion for Shazam in Egypt during the reign of Prince Khufu, Teth-Adam's family is slain by Vandal Savage's slave Ahk-ton which spirals him toward darkness in the thrall of Shazam's demonic daughter Blaze. Shazam strips him of his power, storing it in a scarab, and his former champion rapidly ages for the centuries he had lived as a pseudo-god/avatar. Teth-Adam's reincarnated as a sociopath named Theo Adam who discovers the scarab and uses it to become a super-villain. Teth-Adam begins to become able to assert control over the Black Adam persona, capable of complete control after a malignant tumor is removed from the brain of Theo. Becoming a member of the JSA, Adam would again turn to darkness when he invades his native Kahndaq to free it from a dictator, and takes control of it with a group of former JSA allies/members (most notably Atom Smasher). Later he battled them again after his family is murdered and he declares war against the world.
Landor (The Man who knew too much)	All Star Comics vol. 1 #29 (June 1946)	A man born in the year 2416, however he found his era of peace boring and wanted adventure. He found a time machine in a museum and used it to travel 500 years back, to the year 1946, but it disintegrates on landing. He is unable to get food, so decides to commit crimes, using his advanced knowledge to turn everyday objects into weapons, such as making a fountain pen shoot ink that pins people to the floor, and a typewriter fire bolts when he presses the keys. He challenges the JSA to stop six crimes, but he is foiled at all of them. He challenges Johnny Thunder to a duel of magic, hoping to be captured and taken to the JSA headquarters, where he will destroy them with his flashlight gun. He gets to the headquarters, but Flash takes his gun and Green Lantern destroys it. Not wanting to jail him as he could make a weapon to get out, they decide to send him back to 2446 with Green Lantern's ring. He then decides his era is not so bad after all.
Zor	All Star Comics #31 (October 1946)	A strange creature that resembles a glowing ball, and takes over a toymaker Willy Wonder, making dangerous weaponry to enable crooks to commit crimes. The Duma, a race of otherdimensional creatures, alert the JSA to this, and tell them Zor is a criminal from their world. The JSA prevent the crimes, where the crooks use devices like air-walking shoes and invisible fabrics, and get to Willy Wonder's workshop, where the Duma force the insane Zor out of Willy Wonder's body and take him away.
Per Degaton	All Star Comics #35 (June–July 1947)	An assistant for the Time Trust (a group of scientists that developed time travel technology often involving the JSA), Per Degaton would turn on his compatriots and meet the time traveling robot Mekanique. She enlists his aid against the All-Star Squadron which starts him down a path against history's heroes as he unlocks the secrets of time, becoming one of the JSA's most consistent enemies and a founding member of the Injustice Society as he attempts to alter history to his advantage after stealing the Time Machine of Professor Zee.
Gentleman Ghost	Flash Comics #88 (October 1947)	A notorious highwayman lynched by Nighthawk, Gentleman Ghost would return as an ethereal specter that followed his murderer throughout history as he reincarnated in different bodies (Nighthawk being an iteration of Prince Khufu). Hawkman, latest of these incarnations, would often battle the intangible villain who in time would menace the entire JSA. Later he summons up an army of ghosts to destroy the JSA, but is again beaten.
Injustice Society	All Star Comics #37 (October–November 1947)	A group formed by the Wizard made up of the JSA's worst enemies (individually and collectively). The original line-up featured Vandal Savage, Brain Wave, Per Degaton, Gambler, and the Thinker. They would later include the Fiddler, Sportsmaster, Huntress, Icicle, Harlequin, Shade, and Solomon Grundy. Several members with some youthful additions returned to menace Infinity, Inc. as Injustice Unlimited. The group was later reformed by Johnny Sorrow.
Wax museum guard	All Star Comics #38 (January 1948)	An insane wax museum guard who disguises himself as historical villains Emperor Nero, Goliath, Genghis Khan, Borgia, Captain Kidd, and Attila the Hun, and commits murders in Gotham City which others are framed for. The JSA are all killed when he sends them letters to lure them into traps. Attila the Hun kills Johnny Thunder, but with his last breath he tells Black Canary of their base's location. The JSA's bodies are taken to Paradise Island and revived with the Purple Ray. The guard captures them using exploding wax statues, then when they are suspended in his museum, he reveals he impersonated all the villains, and tries to use hot wax to turn the JSA into wax statues, but Black Canary stops this, the guard falls into a vat of hot wax and is killed.
Lorelei	All Star Comics #39 (February–March 1948)	Leader of a monstrous army in Fairyland that would return to team with the Wizard against Infinity, Inc.
Fire People	All Star Comics #49	A race of fiery people that start attacking the world after a Yellow Comet strikes it. When this happens, a film is activated from people in the past, whose civilisation was destroyed by the Fire People after the yellow comet was sighted. The JSA defeat them, and make a message for a Million yrs into the Future to warn them about the Yellow Comet.
Professor Zodiac, 'The Alchemist', 'The Man who hated science'	All Star Comics #42 (August 1948)	An Alchemist named Zobar Zodiak overhears the dying Galio, who is about 500 yrs old, tell the JSA of the four wonders of Alchemy as he wants someone worthy to have them. He tries to take them, and succeeds in capturing the JSA as they try to get them. Alchemy ties them to the wheel of a perpetual motion machine, with magnetic rays to negate their powers. However they use his elixir of life to become children and slip out of the wheel. They then get to the trial of Zodiac, where they were supposed to be the witnesses for his murder charge, and defeat him. It is revealed the Professor has not actually died. Later he was pulled back in time by Per Degaton to capture the Society, but is sent back.
Evil Star	All Star Comics #44 (December 1948-January 1949)	Guy is the owner of Ace Movel Rental Agency and a crime lord who tries to halt a film outlining his identity as a crime lord that draws the attention of the Society.
King Kull	Captain Marvel Adventures #125 (October 1951)	Ruler of the Submen and frequent foe to Captain Marvel, Kull masterminded a caper where he sneaked into the Rock of Eternity using a faster than light ship and captured Shazam and the gods/goddesses that grant power to the Marvel Family using a ray that slowed down their impulses, with only the swift Mercury escaping and warning other heroes. Allying with Mister Atom, Brainiac, Queen Clea, Penguin, Blockbuster, Ibac, Joker, Weeper, Shade, and Doctor Light, Kull sought to eliminate humanity on all three Earths and it took the combined effort of the Justice Society, Justice League, and Squadron of Justice to stop him.

== Silver Age ==
Villain	First appearance	Description
Qwsp	Aquaman #1 (January–February 1962)	Originally a whimsical ally to Aquaman, the 5th Dimension imp akin to Mister Mxyzptlk and Bat-Mite would take a dark turn much like Aquaman but would end up a psychotic villain menacing Earth and his home dimension. Qwsp's madness generally revolved around the lightning genie Yz/Thunderbolt and later his master Jakeem Thunder.
Demons Three	Justice League of America #10 (March 1962)	Generally a JLA threat, Abnegazar, Rath, and Ghast would be summoned by Mordru in the far future and battle the League, Society, and Legion of Super-Heroes.
Lord of Time	Justice League of America #10 (March 1962)	Generally an enemy to the League, the Lord of Time is a traveler from the year 3786 who hopes to conquer different time periods and organized the Five Warriors From Forever (Jonah Hex, Enemy Ace, Viking Prince, Black Pirate, and Miss Liberty) for a scheme to attack the Eternity Brain and stop it destroying the Universe by stopping time, luring the League and Society to his base. He succeeded in this plan due to Elongated Man.
Crime Champions	Justice League of America #21 (August 1963)	When the Justice Society and Justice League teamed together, their enemies banded together to oppose them after the Fiddler discovered a way to travel between Earths. Formed by the Wizard, the group was made up of the Icicle and Fiddler from Earth-2, and from Earth-1 Doctor Alchemy, Felix Faust, and Chronos. The villains succeeded in capturing each Flash, then tricked the Green lanterns into providing enough power to capture all the heroes, placing them in cages in space. But the Green Lanterns were able to escape, release the others, and the villains were jailed on their respective worlds.
Eclipso	House of Secrets #61 (August 1963)	The original Wrath of God, Eclipso was trapped in the Heart of Darkness and went on to live through those that happened upon shards of the large jewel. He would return repeatedly to face Earth's heroes.
T. O. Morrow	Flash #143 (March 1964)	A brilliant scientist who created the Red Tornado android and would menace the Justice Society and Justice League.
Crime Syndicate of America	Justice League of America #29 (August 1964)	A group of evil JLA counterparts from Earth-3. Ultraman, Superwoman, Power Ring, Johnny Quick, and Owlman. Pre-Crisis they are from Earth-3, where they are opposed to the only heroe Alexander Luthor. They captured the JSA, and placed them in a prison that would blow up Earth-1 and 2 if they were freed, as they wanted to battle the JLA on Earth-2. They were again defeated and placed by Green Lantern in a prison between the two worlds. Once they were recruited by Per Degaton to help him take over Earth-2, but when he was defeated, these events were erased from existence. Post-Crisis they are from the antimatter Universe. The nature of the Worlds means they will win on their Earth, but not on the JLA's Earth.
Lawless League	Justice League of America #37 (August 1965)	The villainous Johnny Thunder of Earth-1 gains control of his Earth-2 doppelgänger's Thunderbolt genie after Johnny wants to see his counterpart but gets knocked out by him, to remove the Justice League from history creating a new universe with Earth-A to compensate. When the JSA foil his schemes, he has the Thunderbolt take his best men in time to take the place of the JLA and gains their powers. His Lawless League was composed of Superman (Ripper Jones), Batman (Bill Gore), Martian Manhunter (Eddie Orson), Flash (Race Morrison), Atom (Barney Judson), and Green Lantern (Monk Loomis). This alternate history is erased when the crooked Johnny tells his thunderbolt o stop these events from never happening after a battle between it and Doctor Fate gets him buffeted about by the conflicting forces.
Anti-Matter Man	Justice League of America #46 (August 1966)	A powerful entity and explorer from the Anti-Matter Universe that destroyed all matter it touched. It travels through Warp-Space towards Earth-1 and Earth-2. The Spectre tries to stop him, but is distorted whenever he touches him, and weakened by his presence. The combined power of the Justice Society and Justice League, protected by the magic of Dr Fate, defeated him, and the Spectre helped to send him back to his own Universe.
Mordru	Adventure Comics #369 (June 1968)	Generally an enemy to the Legion of Super-Heroes, Mordru first historically faced the Legion, League, and Society in the future with the Demons Three. Chronologically, Mordru was a resident of Gemworld and a Lord of Chaos that sought to usurp the rebirth of Dr. Fate in the body of the reincarnated Hector Hall, born from the rape of Dove by her partner Hawk (driven mad by Mordru). When this failed, Mordru would return repeatedly to battle the Society.

== Bronze Age ==
Villain	First appearance	Description
Aquarius	Justice League of America #73 (August 1969)	A living star that tries to destroy Earth-Two's universe and battles the Justice League and Justice Society.
Darkseid	Superman's Pal Jimmy Olsen #134 (November 1970)	Leader of the New Gods of Apokolips, Darkseid would menace the Justice Society when he sought to destroy Earth and place his planet in its stead. The efforts of the Society, Justice League, and New Gods of New Genesis would prevent this.
Nebula Man	Justice League of America #100 (August 1972)	The living universe Nebula Man came into conflict with the Society when the Iron Hand summoned him and would hurl the Seven Soldiers of Victory across time. The efforts of the JSA and JLA managed to return their allies to their proper time and defeated the galactic menace, however the Soldier Wing was killed when defeating him.
Stalker	Stalker #1 (June–July 1975)	Slaying the demon Dgrth, Stalker sought dimensions to destroy which led him to Earth and an inevitable defeat at the hands of the Justice Society and their allies.
Kobra	Kobra #1 (February 1976)	A terrorist organization whose leader carries the same name, Kobra stands apart as arguably the most dangerous terrorist cell on Earth. Its ranks have faced the Society on many occasions, such as costing the life of Atom Smasher's mother (before he went back in time and switched her place with Extant) in an attack and whose leader was murdered by Black Adam, ripping out his heart when he almost escaped justice by walking out on his trial.
Secret Society of Super Villains	Secret Society of Super Villains #1 (May 1976)	An organization of super-villains that has become one of the largest such groups on Earth. While generally menacing the Justice League, they have also faced the Justice Society several times. Once, Ultra-Humanite organized the group to face both hero teams with Brainwave, Monocle, Psycho-Pirate, Rag Doll, Cheetah, Floronic Man, Killer Frost, Mist, and Signalman.
The Valkyries	DC Special #29 (August 1977)	The Valkyries of myth summoned by Hitler with the Spear of Destiny to protect a long-range bomber targeting Washington, D.C. When the United States' heroes thwarted this scheme, the Valkyrie Gudra escaped, infiltrated the White House, and assassinated President Franklin D. Roosevelt. The Spectre pleaded for the man's life with the Voice of God, however, and Roosevelt was resurrected. It was this union of heroes against the Valkyries that prompted those present to form the Justice Society.
Baron Blitzkrieg	World's Finest Comics #246 (August–September 1977)	The leader of Shadowspire and a high-ranking agent for Hitler. Speedster Zyklon accompanied Blitzkrieg when he attempted to steal the Liberty Bell which would result in the heroine Liberty Belle acquiring sonic powers.
Kung	Wonder Woman #237 (November 1977)	A samurai able to turn into animals that was an agent for Japan during World War II. He would team with Prince Daka, Sumo the Samurai, and Tsunami to steal Starman's gravity rod. He died in the attack on Hiroshima and returned as a spirit to menace the JSA.
Arthur Pemberton	All-Star Comics #70 (January–February 1978)	Forming the Strike Force and taking the name Number One, Arthur Pemberton (nephew of Sylvester Pemberton) sought to obtain the most cutting-edge weapons and technology through theft. Meeting defeat at the hands of his uncle and Wildcat, Arthur would lose his fortune and place in the organization. Years later, he returned once more leading Strike Force as a mercenary group, wielding the Mundane Staff of Crete.
Strike Force	All-Star Comics #70 (January–February 1978)	Formed by the nephew of the original Star-Spangled Kid Arthur Pemberton, Strike Force would part ways with their creator when Arthur's fortune was seized by his heroic relative. Later, they would return to menace Power Company under the direction of Doctor Cyber. The group returned to kidnap Stargirl for Johnny Sorrow in another bid to resurrect the King of Tears.
Frederic Vaux	Adventure Comics #463 (May 1979)	A sorcerer that sought to erase the memory of heroes from the Earth's people on behalf of the Lords of Chaos. He empowered Bill Jensen who went on to murder Earth-2's Batman.
Spirit King	Justice League of America #171 (October 1979)	Roger Romaine sought to become a necromancer, killing women in Portsmouth, Washington while hunted by Mr. Terrific. Meeting his end at the grisly hands of the Spectre, he returned from Hell during a JLA/JSA meeting. Possessing Jay Garrick, he murdered Terrific before the soul of the dead hero returned to return Romaine back to Hell. When Hal Jordan became the Spectre, he tried to become a Spirit of Redemption which allowed Romaine to lead all those sent to Hell by the Spectre back to Earth and raise an undead army. Only when Jordan conceded to being the spirit of vengeance were the spirits returned.
House Un-American Activities Committee	Adventure Comics #466 (November–December 1979)	The formation of HUAC resulted from movements of politicians like Senator Joseph McCarthy in response to the Red Scare. Hosting a hearing bringing the JSA before them from fears of supporting Communism, the heroes were ordered to unmask to prove their loyalty to America. The Society refused and promptly left, choosing to disband and generally retire. It is claimed that Vandal Savage manipulated these events.
Dragon King	All-Star Squadron #4 (December 1981)	A high ranking agent for Japan during WWII, Dragon King acquired the Holy Grail which galvanized the Sphere of Influence. He would return years later to menace the Star-Spangled Kid before acquiring the Spear of Destiny to create an army of super-soldiers bringing him against the JSA again. In addition, he also spliced his DNA with a lizard's DNA to become a reptilian humanoid.

== Modern Age ==
Villain	First appearance	Description
Surtr	Last Days of the Justice Society #1 (1986)	King of the Fire Giants, Surtr would bathe the world in fire at Ragnarök. When the JSA chose to face the event for the sake of the world and were trapped in an endless loop, Surtr's forces were trapped with them.
Mekanique	All-Star Squadron #58 (June 1986)	Based on Metropolis' Machine-Man, Mekanique traveled from the future to ensure her time came to pass but change it such that the workers did not rise up. She would team with Per Degaton where the pair become a couple.
Axis Amerika	Young All-Stars #1 (June 1987)	Team composed of some of the top operatives among the Axis Powers. Its members are based on the Justice League: Superman (Übermensch), Batman (Grösshorn Eule), Robin (Fledermaus), Wonder Woman (Gudra the Valkyrie), Aquaman (Sea Wolf), and Green Arrow (Usil). They were also joined by Kamikaze whom bears some similarities to Bulletman.
Sons of Dawn	Young All-Stars #28 (August 1989)	Hugo Danner (whom Superman is partly based upon) employs a formula his father created that granted the son superhuman abilities to empower a group of men under his thrall. When Hugo's son Iron Munro and his allies the Young All-Stars discovered them, Hugo unleashed his group on the world and the many mystery men of America in the All-Star Squadron and Justice Society had to combine forces to best them.
Extant	Zero Hour: Crisis in Time! #4 (September 1994)	After Hank Hall was driven mad by Mordru, he became Monarch whom consumed Waverider and developed into Extant. When the heroes of history and the universe opposed him, Doctor Mid-Nite, Atom, and Hourman (though, the future's Hourman switched places with him) paid the ultimate price. Extant would return to face the JSA later seeking Hourman's Worlogog, but the group defeated him where Atom Smasher had the villain switch places with his mother killed in an airplane bombing caused by Kobra, apparently slaying the time-manipulating villain.
Johnny Sorrow	Secret Origins of Super-Villains 80-Page Giant #1 (December 1999)	An otherworldly villain, Sorrow became a pawn of the King of Tears that saw an opportunity to get revenge on the Justice Society who foiled his schemes in turn tearing his body apart and making him a target for the Lovecraftian entity. He would be the force to reform the Injustice Society. His face has been so transformed by his experience that it will kill most beings that look at it.
King of Tears	JSA #16 (November 2000)	A god from the Subtle Realms, the King of Tears has escaped his dimension on several occasions thanks to his agent Johnny Sorrow and the Injustice Society.
Onimar Synn	JSA #23 (June 2001)	The Sin Eater, one of the Seven Devils that razed Thanagar at the dawn of its civilization, Synn is the master of Nth metal, his gigantic body composed entirely from it. One of the greatest threats to ever face the planet, Synn can steal the life out of the living to fuel his strength and return them as an undead servant. One of Hawkman's reincarnations was attributed to be Thanagar's champion against Synn and his armies.
Roulette	JSA Secret Files #2 (September 2001)	Granddaughter to the original Roulette, a frequent opponent to the original Mr. Terrific (where the modern believes had relations with her grandmother to produce her ancestry), Roulette operates an illegal coliseum-like series of events that pits super-heroes and their ilk against each other to the death for entertainment.
Lord Dynamo	JSA: Strange Adventures #1 (October 2004)	Erich Donnerstein was a brilliant, young scientist that was paralyzed and devised ways to move using different forms of energy. Eventually, he became composed of energy and had to consume greater amounts of energy in order to continue to live, at one point absorbing the Thunderbolt genie.
Isis	52 #3 (May 2006)	Black Adam's wife, an Egyptian slave given to him by Intergang to get his favour. He gives her the power of the most powerful Egyptian goddess Isis, giving her vast magical abilities. She is killed by the Four Horsemen of Apokolips, causing Black Adam to go mad, and after being returned to life by the sorcerer Felix Faust and freed from his control by Adam, she attempts to wipe out all life on Earth, but the wizard Shazam turns her to stone with Adam, though her brother Osiris later restores her.
Kid Karnevil	Shadowpact #1 (July 2006)	Originally introduced as an enemy to the Shadowpact as a member of the Pentacle, Karnevil is a sociopath who idolizes the Joker and wishes to become more renowned than him as a force of evil (in turn slaying the Joker when he's accomplished this feat to punctuate it). Karnevil would infiltrate the JSA as Billy Armstrong, the All-American Kid, and become Mister America's sidekick. Karnevil would attack the Society with the Fourth Reich before activating the Darkness Engine, which negates metahuman abilities, and within 20 years rule the world as the Führer. However, the efforts of Mr. Terrific would alter history and stop Karnevil in the past before the Darkness Engine can be activated.
Fourth Reich	Justice Society of America vol. 3 #2 (February 2007)	A group of Neo-Nazis and other Supremacists formed by Vandal Savage that tried to eliminate heroes by killing their family and loved ones in hopes it would eliminate their legacies. They would return under Kid Karnevil. Membership includes Captain Nazi, Baroness Blitzkrieg, Rebel, Reichsmark, Swastika, White Dragon, Hunter, Shadow of War, Green Ghoul, Count Berlin, Captain Swastika, Doctor Demon, Baron Gestapo, and Captain Murder (new members introduced in the team's second appearance were originally MLJ Comics properties that were folded into the DCU).
Gog	Justice Society of America vol. 3 #16 (July 2008)	An Old God who empowered William Matthews (who took on his master's name) to eliminate false gods in preparation of the arrival of Gog to Earth. The original absorbs his disciple and is reborn, performing miracles in exchange for worship. These actions split the Justice Society, one side led by Magog and performing Gog's will until the Old God tried to turn the Flash into lightning. His would-be acolytes reformed and the JSA whole again, they decapitate Gog and embed his head in the Source Wall.
Gods of Parador	JSA All-Stars vol. 2 #8 (September 2010)	A group of four youths that obtain god-like abilities. They take on the names Yum-Kimil, Ah-Kin, Ix-Chel, and Nacon.
Scythe	Justice Society of America vol. 3 #44 (December 2010)	Product of the Nazi-sponsored Drachen Project in Libya, the Flash and Green Lantern were sent by the CIA in 1941 take out the experiment in its entirety. However, when Lantern discovers the experiment to be an infant, he struggles against his ally until finally they resolve to let the child live. In later history, the experiment was held at the CIA's black jail in Afghanistan until he escaped and held an assault on the city of Monument Point, nearly destroying the location if not for the intervention of the Justice Society. Though captured, the victory is short-lived as Scythe escapes and returns to the city.
Doctor Chaos	Justice Society of America vol. 3 #46 (February 2011)	A highly trained mercenary hired to destroy Monument Point.
Puzzlemen	JSA All-Stars vol. 2 #14 (March 2011)	Stone giants behind thefts that seem insignificant but could lead to doom for humanity.
Killer Wasp	Justice Society of America #9	The son of Wildcat's foe Yellow Wasp, Killer Wasp was the test subject of many of his father's experiments. Yellow Wasp mutated his son into a half-insect/half-human hybrid. He has enhanced strength, agility and endurance. He also has wasp-like wings on his back which allow him to fly up to speeds of 50 mph, and the ability to shoot electrical blasts from his hands. Soon after, Yellow Wasp kidnapped Wildcat's son, Jake. Rather than slaying the hero's child, Yellow Wasp began to think kindly of Jake, raising him as a (some would say favorite) son. Killer Wasp soon killed the two in a fit of jealousy. Shortly afterward, he joined the Injustice Society formed by Johnny Sorrow. The group of supervillains attacked JSA headquarters while most of the team was out, with only Wildcat in the building. Killer Wasp faced off with Wildcat, who taunted him, claiming he was too scared to face him in a hand-to-hand fight. Wasp took off his mask in response, and engaged in open battle. In the end, Wildcat was victorious. During the Infinite Crisis storyline, Killer Wasp appears as a member of Alexander Luthor Jr.'s Secret Society of Super Villains. Killer Wasp shows up again in JSA All Stars #2, again fighting under the command of Johnny Sorrow, as part of the Injustice Society. He is killed when Johnny cuts open his chest and removes his heart.

== See also ==
- List of Justice League enemies
- List of Batman family enemies
- List of Superman enemies
- List of Wonder Woman enemies
- List of Flash enemies
- List of Green Lantern enemies
- List of Captain Marvel enemies
- List of Aquaman enemies
- List of Green Arrow enemies
- List of Hawkman enemies
- List of Plastic Man enemies
