= Iron Munro =

Comics character

- Arn Munro, artist Brian Murray.

Publication information
- Publisher: DC Comics
- First appearance: Young All-Stars #1 (June 1987)
- Created by: Roy Thomas (writer); Dann Thomas (co-plotter); Michael Bair (artist); Brian Murray (artist)

In-story information
- Alter ego: Arnold Raymond "Iron" Munro
- Species: Metahuman
- Team affiliations: Young All-Stars; All-Star Squadron; Freedom Fighters; Supermen of America
- Notable aliases: Arn Munro
- Abilities: Super strength and speed Invulnerability; Able to make great leaps Longevity; Enhanced reflexes

Iron Munro (Arn Munro) is a superhero character appearing in American comic books published by DC Comics. Roy Thomas created the character in 1987 for Young All-Stars. He largely served to replace Superman in stories set during World War II after the Crisis on Infinite Earths storyline eliminated continuities in which Superman was active in this period.

Following the cancellation of Thomas' World War II-set comic All-Star Squadron, a follow-up series was created following a new team, the Young All-Stars. Iron Munro was one of several new characters Thomas created as analogues for popular superheroes written out of the continuity, with comparable powers and appearance to Superman's. He was inspired by two 1930s pulp fiction characters who in turn prefigured Superman: John W. Campbell's science fiction hero Aarn Munro, who appeared in comics as "Iron Munro", and Hugo Danner, the protagonist of Philip Wylie's 1930 novel Gladiator, who had powers similar to Superman's and is sometimes seen as an inspiration.

Young All-Stars did not achieve the popularity of All-Star Squadron, which had featured better known characters from the Golden Age of Comic Books, and the series was cancelled in 1989 due to low sales. Iron Munro continued to make occasional appearances in DC Comics.

== Development ==
From 1981 to 1987, Roy Thomas wrote DC Comics' popular series All-Star Squadron, set on Earth-Two, a parallel universe based on the company's characters of the 1940s Golden Age of Comic Books. All-Star Squadron depicts a team of Earth-Two versions of characters like Superman, Batman, and Wonder Woman fighting in World War II. In 1985, DC launched the Crisis on Infinite Earths crossover storyline, which ultimately eliminated the company's Multiverse of parallel worlds in favor of a new unified continuity. This removed Superman and others from the World War II setting, and DC cancelled All-Star Squadron in 1987.

DC charged Thomas with writing a follow-up series with new characters. He created Young All-Stars, featuring a new team of World War II-era superheroes. His concept was that the "displaced energy" of the removed superheroes generated analogs to replace them; as such, most of the new cast stood in for the heroes written out of the continuities. Iron Munro replaced Superman with similar powers and appearance; Flying Fox, Fury, and Neptune Perkins replaced Batman, Wonder Woman, and Aquaman respectively.

Thomas' Iron Munro was inspired by two characters from 1930s pulp fiction. His name comes from Aarn Munro, the hero of John W. Campbell's 1934 science fiction novel The Mightiest Machine and some subsequent works. Campbell's character had incredible strength and agility from growing up on a high-gravity planet (Jupiter), the same explanation for Superman's powers in early stories. Notably, this is an inversion of Edgar Rice Burroughs' earlier character John Carter, an earthling whose strength increased on the smaller planet of Mars. Aarn Munro appeared in Shadow Comics as "Iron Munro" in the 1940s. Additionally, Iron Munro is based on Hugo Danner, the protagonist of Philip Wylie's 1930 novel Gladiator. Often viewed as a precursor to and possible inspiration for Superman, Hugo Danner likewise had otherworldly strength, speed, and impervious skin. In a nod to Superman's debt to Gladiator, Thomas made Iron Munro the son of Hugo Danner.

== Publication history ==
Loosely following Philip Wylie's novel Gladiator, the comics establish that in 1894, scientist Abednego Danner injected his pregnant wife with an experimental serum. Their son Hugo was born with super-human strength, speed, and nigh-invulnerability. Hugo's powers led him through a number of adventures, but set him apart from mortal humans, bringing him grief. Eventually, Hugo staged his own death in the Yucatán Peninsula and went into hiding. He briefly returned to Colorado and had a one-night stand with his high school sweetheart, Anna Blake, who became pregnant. When Hugo disappeared for good, Blake married a young businessman named John Munro, who never realized the child she bore was not his own. Their son, Arnold, began exhibiting superhuman powers of strength and invulnerability at age ten. Remembering Hugo's troubles, Anna made her son promise to keep his abilities a secret until he turned eighteen.

As a baseball player at his high school in Indian Creek, Colorado, Munro earned the nickname "Iron". He was a senior there when, in April 1942, he saved the superheroes TNT and Dan the Dyna-Mite from a burning car crash. TNT died but he managed to bring Dyna-Mite to a nearby hospital. Subsequently, Munro and other new "Young All-Stars" aided the All-Star Squadron in defeating Axis Amerika. Franklin D. Roosevelt asked Munro and the others to join the Squadron, about which Munro was reluctant, but he accompanied them on a cross-country War Bond promotion.

Soon thereafter, Arn received a mysterious diary written by Hugo Danner, his father. He learned about his father's troubled life as one of the 20th century's first metahumans. This led the young hero on a quest to learn of his father's fate. After having read his father's diary, Arn turned to the government's secret Project M, demanding to know the location of the "Dinosaur Island" mentioned in his father's diary. There he met Georgia Challenger, who led him instead to Maple White Land in South America. Surprisingly they found Arn's father, Hugo Danner, who had spawned a new band of "offspring", the Sons of Dawn. Danner used his father's formula to bestow powers on these Sons of Dawn and mentioned that the creators of the villain Übermensch had also stolen that formula.

Arn was forced to oppose his father when Danner ordered the Sons of Dawn to attack a Brazilian city. The combined might of the All-Star Squadron defeated the Sons of Dawn and Danner was killed.

=== Legacy ===
During the war, Iron Munro also met his future wife, the Squadron member known as Phantom Lady, Sandra Knight. Before the two of them were married, Sandra conceived a child (which she never revealed to him). She confided only in the Atom, Al Pratt, who helped her give the child up for adoption. The hospital mistakenly listed Al as the father on the child's birth certificate. The child was named Walter Pratt and later became the father of Kate Spencer (the current vigilante Manhunter).

After the war, both Arn and Sandra started working for the U.S. Government as members of the O.S.S. offshoot called Argent. Arn took the code name "Gladiator One". The couple eventually married and on numerous missions came up against his WWII Nazi nemesis, Baron Blitzkrieg (calling himself simply The Baron and working for the Soviets). When the couple bore a second child, it was kidnapped by the Baron when Sandra was on a mission in Communist Poland. The child was assumed killed at the time.

The couple gradually grew apart and sometime in the 1960s, Phantom Lady disappeared while on a covert mission for Argent. Though Munro later discovered she was alive, the two were never reunited.

Munro settled in Florida with his friend, Roy Lincoln (the Human Bomb). There he eventually met the young hero Grant Emerson (Damage). Munro helped Emerson search for the identity of his biological parents. For a time, it appeared that Grant might be Arn and Sandra's lost child. Eventually they learned that Damage was actually the son of the Atom, Al Pratt, and his wife.

Iron Munro continues to serve as an adventurer and apparently benefits from extended youth. During the massive war between Imperiex and Brainiac 13, the Justice Society's Sand recruited an army of All-Stars, which Arn joined. Afterwards, he joined the Human Bomb and Damage in the Freedom Fighters. This group was doomed and Arn lost his good friend Roy when several of the Freedom Fighters were killed by the Society of Super-Villains.

Sandra Knight later learned that the child she gave up for adoption, Walter Pratt, had become a homicidal maniac. Pratt died when he was cut in half midstream in teleportation. Sandra met Spencer, and months later brought Arn to Kate for an introduction to her and Ramsey, his great-grandson.

Iron Munro became part of a network called Supermen of America after Superman learned that he cannot be everywhere at once. Along with other heroes, like Steel, Super-Chief, Supergirl, and Superboy, he has a signal watch that can be used for summons in emergencies. Iron Munro also works closely with the rehabilitated villain Livewire and S.T.A.R. Labs employee Serling Roquette. Livewire is accepted into the team.

== Powers ==
Munro abilities are superhuman strength and speed which provide him with a level of invulnerability to firearms, enhanced reflexes, and a slower rate of ageing than ordinary humans.
