= Tigress (DC Comics) =

Names of some fictional characters appearing in DC Comics

Publication information
- Publisher: DC Comics
- First appearance: Zatara foe: Action Comics #1 (1938); Paula Brooks: Sensation Comics # 68 (Aug 1947); Artemis Crock: Infinity Inc. #34 (Jan 1987)
- Created by: Zatara foe: Fred Guardineer; Paula Brooks: Mort Meskin; Artemis Crock: Roy Thomas Todd McFarlane

In-story information
- Alter ego: Paula Brooks; Artemis Crock; Tabitha Galavan (Gotham)
- Abilities: Hand to hand combat

Tigress is the name of three different comic book characters, all of whom have appeared in various series published by DC Comics.

The original Tigress debuted in Action Comics #1 (1938) during the Golden Age of Comics as an enemy of Zatara. The second Tigress was Paula Brooks, who first appeared in Sensation Comics #68 (1947) as the original Huntress and later reintroduced as Tigress in Young All-Stars #6 (1987) following the Crisis on Infinite Earths (1985–1986) crossover series. The third character to assume the Tigress name was Artemis Crock, who debuted in Infinity, Inc. #34 (1987). Artemis is the daughter of Paula Brooks and Crusher Crock, initially pursuing a criminal career modeled after her parents. Following the New 52 (2011–2016) continuity reboot, Artemis officially took on the identity of Tigress in The Culling (2012) crossover story arc, where she assists the Teen Titans.

An original incarnation of Tigress called Tabitha Galavan appeared in the live-action series Gotham (2014–2019), portrayed by Jessica Lucas. Additionally, the Paula Brooks incarnation of Tigress appeared in the live-action DC Universe / The CW series Stargirl (2020–2022), portrayed by Joy Osmanski. A teenage version of Artemis Crock appeared in Young Justice (2010–2022) as one of the main characters, voiced by Stephanie Lemelin. Her mother, a character inspired by Paula Brooks named Paula Nguyen, also appeared in the series, voiced by Kelly Hu. A character inspired by Artemis, named Evelyn Sharp, appeared as a supporting character in Arrow (2012–2020), portrayed by Madison McLaughlin.

== The original Tigress ==
=== Publication history ===
The original Golden Age Tigress.

The first Tigress appeared during the Golden Age, whose alter ego is unknown and who also went by the alias Miss La France, was a thief and spy who served as an enemy of Zatara in the late 1930s.

She debuted in Action Comics #1 (June 1938), and was created by Fred Guardineer. She wore tiger-striped sweaters and ran gangs of thieves and murderers. She appears throughout twelve issues of Action Comics, including issues #1–3, 6, 7, 9, 10, 22, 23, 25, 30, 35 and 42. In her initial appearance, she battles Zatara and his assistant Tong while attempting to rob a freight train. She escapes and later resurfaces in stories using various methods in attempts to kill wealthy men, including using an attacking airplane, poisoning their drinks and infecting them with a disease from a rare South American insect. She also uses her influence as a mob boss to pressure other criminals into assisting her in crime sprees, which usually involve bank robberies and thefts of other valuables.

The Artemis entry in Who's Who Update '87 #1 states that the Golden Age Tigress is the mother of Paula Brooks (the second Tigress and original Huntress) and the grandmother of Artemis Crock (the third Tigress). However, Who's Who Update '87 #5 included a retraction of that information and stated that neither Paula Brooks nor Artemis Crock is related to her.

== Paula Brooks ==
Paula Brooks
- Paula Brooks as the Tigress. Art by Michael Bair, Howard Simpson, and Brian Murray

Publication information
- Publisher: DC Comics
- First appearance: As Huntress: Sensation Comics #68 (August 1947); As Tigress: Young All-Stars #6 (November 1987)
- Created by: Huntress: Mort Meskin; Tigress: Roy Thomas

In-story information
- Alter ego: Paula Brooks
- Species: Human
- Team affiliations: Injustice Society; Young All-Stars; All-Star Squadron
- Partnerships: Sportsmaster (husband); Artemis Crock (youngest daughter)
- Supporting character of: Artemis Crock
- Notable aliases: Tigress, Huntress
- Abilities: Skilled hand-to-hand fighter with sharpened claw-like fingernails

Paula Brooks is a fictional comic book character published by DC Comics. She is one of many characters to use the names Tigress and Huntress. Paula Brooks is married to Sportsmaster and the mother of Artemis Crock.

Paula Brooks appeared as Tigress on the DC Universe streaming service show Stargirl played by Joy Osmanski. The show also appeared on The CW Network.

=== Publication history ===
Brooks first appeared in Sensation Comics #68 as the Huntress where she was created by artist Mort Meskin and an uncredited writer. Later, it is retroactively revealed that she was a heroine named the Tigress before becoming a criminal where this alias was created by Roy Thomas.

=== Pre-Crisis ===
Prior to the Crisis on Infinite Earths, she battles Helena Wayne (who had become the new Huntress) and is defeated.

During this time, an Earth-1 Huntress and Sportsmaster are revealed. They fight Batgirl and Robin in Batman Family and then challenge the Earth-1 superheroes to a baseball game between heroes and villains. When the heroes win, the Earth-1 Huntress and Sportsmaster reform and are not seen again.

After the Crisis on Infinite Earths, the Earth-1 pair cease to exist and the Golden Age versions become the dominant version in the new unified universe.

=== Post-Crisis ===
In the pages of Young All-Stars, Paula Brooks was retroactively given the codename Tigress. These stories took place prior to her villainous career as the Huntress.

At this point, the young Paula Brooks (approximately age 18-19) is a superheroine, and fights both Nazis and criminals alongside Iron Munro, the first Fury, Neptune Perkins, Tsunami and Dan the Dyna-Mite. During these stories, Paula expresses a fan worship of Paul Kirk, the Manhunter. She frequently makes a play for Iron Munro as well. During a battle with the Nazi warriors known as Axis Amerika, Tigress is attacked and seemingly killed by the Valkyrie known as Gudra. She was revived (it is unclear if she really was actually dead) with a new attitude, which eventually leads to her becoming the villainous Huntress. In the late 1990s JSA Returns mini-series, Tigress has yet to fully embrace her villainous attitude and was still operating as a heroine and companion of Manhunter.

A full page of panel of Sensation Comics #68 (Aug. 1947), featuring Paula Brooks' debut.

Upon donning a tiger-skin costume and becoming Huntress years later, Paula Brooks tracked down Wildcat and trapped him in her private zoo as part of her plan to capture people who would throw people in prison. Wildcat became the first person she caught to break out.

Huntress returned, plotting to capture Ted Grant and replace him with a double so that she would bet on his opponent and get money when the double lost. When Huntress captured "Stretch" Skinner, she drew the attention of Wildcat. Huntress and Wildcat fought to a draw as Wildcat and Skinner escaped her ship. When Ted won, a disguised Huntress watched the match and later slipped away.

Due to her reputation for fighting Wildcat, Huntress is invited to join the Injustice Society. In a competition to see who would lead the group, Huntress manages to steal Plymouth Rock and nearly defeats Atom and Flash.

Huntress and Sportsmaster are later engaged and have a daughter named Artemis, who goes on to become a criminal like them.

=== DC Rebirth ===
In 2016, DC Comics implemented a relaunch of its books called "DC Rebirth", which restored its continuity to a form much as it was prior to "The New 52" reboot. Tigress appears as a member of the Injustice Society.

=== Powers and abilities ===
Brooks has no powers or unusual technology, but she did utilize various types of wild beasts in committing her crimes. She is also a skilled hand-to-hand fighter whose nails were once sharpened like talons.

She also used a small crossbow and a steady supply of crossbow bolts. She has also been known to use throwing nets and bolos to trap her prey.

=== Other versions ===
Paula Brooks appears in The Golden Age, which takes place in an alternate universe. In August 1948, Brooks is granted amnesty for her crimes in return for her allegiance to Tex Thompson's newly created anti-communism force. In 1950, after learning that Thompson is actually the ruthless Ultra-Humanite, Brooks joins other heroes in opposing him and his allies. Traumatized by the deaths of her lover, Lance Gallant, and friends such as Miss America and Sportsmaster in the ensuing conflict, Brooks returns to crime.

=== Television ===
- Paula Brooks / Tigress makes a cameo appearance in the Batman: The Brave and the Bold episode "Aquaman's Outrageous Adventure!".
- Paula Brooks, now named Paula Crock Nguyen appears in Young Justice, voiced by Kelly Hu. She is a composite character between herself and the mother Jade Nguyen. Introduced in the episode "Downtime", she had previously operated as Huntress before becoming disabled. She lives with her younger daughter, Artemis Crock, in Gotham City, and is aware of her eldest daughter Jade Nguyen's activities as an assassin.
- Paula Brooks / Tigress appears in Stargirl, portrayed by Joy Osmanski. This version is a member of the Injustice Society of America (ISA) and Blue Valley High School's gym teacher. Throughout the first season, she joined the ISA in attacking the Justice Society of America (JSA) before reluctantly going into retirement. In the present, Brooks and Sportsmaster come out of retirement to stop Stargirl's JSA from interfering with the ISA's plans, only to be foiled by them. In the second season finale, Artemis Crock breaks Brooks and Sportsmaster out of prison so they can help Cindy Burman and the JSA fight Eclipso. In the third season, Brooks and Sportsmaster work with the JSA to investigate Gambler's death until they are killed by Icicle.

=== Miscellaneous ===
Paula Brooks / Tigress makes a cameo appearance in the DC Super Hero Girls episode "Welcome to Super Hero High".

=== Reception ===
Michael Eury and Gina Misiroglu characterized the original Huntress Paula Brooks as "a relatively obscure Golden Age villainess", whose title was borrowed for the character of Helena Wayne.

Sophie Bonadè found that Paula Brooks, like a number of villainesses of the time, falls under the "Dating Catwoman" cliché of being in a romantic relation to the hero she fights.

== Artemis Crock ==
Artemis Crock
- Artemis Crock as Tigress, as depicted in JSA #17 (December 2000). Art by Stephen Sadowski.

Publication information
- Publisher: DC Comics
- First appearance: Infinity, Inc. #34 (January 1987)
- Created by: Roy Thomas; Todd McFarlane

In-story information
- Species: Human
- Team affiliations: Injustice Society; Dead Hero Club; Secret Society of Super Villains
- Notable aliases: Tigress
- Abilities: Highly skilled hand-to-hand combatant and martial artist; Above-average agility, endurance, stamina and reflexes; Expert markswoman and swordswoman

Artemis Crock is a fictional comic book character, appearing in American comic books published by DC Comics. First appearing in Infinity, Inc. #34 (January 1987), she has appeared as both a supervillain and superhero, known mononymously as Artemis. Artemis is also one of many characters to use the name Tigress. In addition, she is also the daughter of Sportsmaster and Paula Crock.

Outside of comic books, Artemis has appeared in Young Justice, voiced by Stephanie Lemelin, and Stargirl, portrayed by Stella Smith. Additionally, a character inspired by Artemis named Evelyn Sharp appears in Arrow, portrayed by Madison McLaughlin.

=== Publication history ===
Artemis Crock debuted in Infinity, Inc. #34 (January 1987) and was created by writer Roy Thomas and artist Todd McFarlane.

=== Fictional character biography ===
Artemis Crock is the daughter of the Golden Age villains Paula Brooks and Crusher Crock. She had taken up a career in crime, modeled on that of her parents, but only after some years did she take on the mantle of Tigress.

During the DC mini-series Legends, the people of America are turned against heroes, and law was made that no one could operate legally wearing a costume. This did not affect the villains much, as they are already lawbreakers. Known by the mononym Artemis, Artemis Crock joins the Wizard in his new Injustice Society, called Injustice Unlimited. The group overcomes the security at the International Trade Conference in Calgary, namely Infinity, Inc. and a contingent of the Global Guardians. Their plan is thwarted when Hourman frees himself and Solomon Grundy is brought in from the Arctic Circle. Grundy incapacitates Artemis and her parents, but they manage to escape.

Weeks later, Injustice Unlimited plots to murder the members of Infinity, Inc. to make a name for themselves. Artemis goes after Jade, whom she apparently kills in combat. The members of Injustice Unlimited intend to bring all the remaining Infinitors to Stellar Studios and kill them, but this plan is thwarted by the unwillingness of Hazard to cooperate and the sudden reappearance of Jade and Brainwave.

Artemis later changes her codename to Tigress and has an on-again, off-again relationship with the second Icicle, with whom she has a daughter named Isabelle. Artemis helps Icicle, Wizard, Solomon Grundy, Gentleman Ghost, Rag Doll, and Thinker break into JSA headquarters and steal the Prometheus Key, a key that is used to open doors between reality and magic. The key allows Johnny Sorrow, who normally exists in another dimension, to manifest on Earth.

=== The New 52 ===
In The New 52 continuity reboot, a new version of Artemis was introduced in The Culling crossover event. She helps the Teen Titans get their bearings before the Culling begins and introduces them to other metahuman teens captured by the villain Harvest. After the Titans are taken, a member of Harvest's crew tries to put Artemis in a state of rage. She fights back, but is killed. Her death helps motivate the Teen Titans and the Legion of Super-Heroes to work together to take down Harvest. The Titans later discover that Artemis survived and was healed by the Colonel, a servant of Harvest.

The original Artemis is reintroduced in the DC Rebirth relaunch.

=== Powers and abilities ===
Tigress/Artemis possesses no superhuman abilities; however, she is an expert archer, swordswoman and markswoman. Artemis is also a highly skilled in hand-to-hand combat, along with the use of various gadgets (including her compact crossbow, knives, nets, and bolas).

=== Television ===
Artemis Crock as she appears in the first season of Young Justice.

- Artemis Crock makes a non-speaking cameo appearance in the Batman: The Brave and the Bold episode "Aquaman's Outrageous Adventure!".
- A teenage version of Artemis Crock (full name Artemis Lian Crock) appears in Young Justice, voiced by Stephanie Lemelin. This version is of Vietnamese and European descent. Introduced in the first season, she poses as Green Arrow's niece and new sidekick and joins the Team following the departure of Green Arrow's original sidekick, Roy Harper. Though the Team discovers her true history and connection to their enemy Sportsmaster, she remains with them at the encouragement of Robin and enters a relationship with Wally West. In the second season, Artemis assumes the Tigress identity to infiltrate the Light. In the fourth season, she becomes a college professor and enters a relationship with Jason Bard.
- A character inspired by Artemis named Evelyn Sharp appears in Arrow, portrayed by Madison McLaughlin.
- Artemis Crock appears in Stargirl, portrayed by Stella Smith. This version is an athletic and competitive student at Blue Valley High School and classmate of the titular character. As of the second season, she was moved into a foster home following the arrest of her parents, Sportsmaster and Tigress, and is secretly manipulated by Cindy Burman and Eclipso into joining their group Injustice Unlimited. After joining Burman, Eclipso, and Isaac Bowin in fighting Stargirl's Justice Society of America (JSA) however, Artemis flees after Eclipso sends Burman to the Shadowlands and consumes Bowin. She later breaks her parents out of prison so they can help the JSA and Burman defeat Eclipso. In the third season, Artemis works to prove herself as a candidate for JSA membership and later gets into college, only to lose her parents to Icicle and move in with the Whitmore-Dugan family. As of a flash-forward in the series finale, she has successfully joined the JSA.

=== Film ===
- The Young Justice incarnation of Artemis makes a non-speaking cameo appearance in Scooby-Doo! WrestleMania Mystery.
- The Young Justice incarnation of Artemis makes a non-speaking cameo appearance in Teen Titans Go! To the Movies.

=== Video games ===
- The Young Justice incarnation of Artemis appears as a playable character in Young Justice: Legacy, voiced again by Stephanie Lemelin.
- Artemis Crock, in her heroine and Tigress forms, appear as separate playable characters in Lego DC Super-Villains.

== Other versions ==
=== Earth-S ===
An unknown woman nicknamed Tigress from Earth-S appears in Spy Smasher #2 (December 1941). This version is an enemy of Spy Smasher.

=== Quality Universe ===
An unknown woman dubbed The Tigress or Tiger Lady appears in Blackhawk #11 (June 1946). This version is the leader of a gang of international criminal fugitives who had fled the civilized world and hid herself in a jungle fortress within a mountainous, tropical part of the world before she is killed by island natives while her forces are killed by the Blackhawk Squadron.

== Original incarnation in other media ==
- An original incarnation of Tigress appears in the Batman Beyond episode "Splicers", voiced by Cree Summer. This version is an unnamed human who was spliced with tiger DNA and serves genetics expert Dr. Abel Cuvier.
- An original incarnation of Tigress, Tabitha Galavan, appears in Gotham, portrayed by Jessica Lucas. This version is the sister and lead enforcer of Theo Galavan, a member of the Dumas family, and step-aunt of Silver St. Cloud.
