= List of DC Comics characters: U =

== Ubermensch ==
Übermensch, also known as Overman, is the name of several supervillains who have appeared in American comic books published by DC Comics as a counterpart of Superman.

=== First version ===
The first version was created by Roy Thomas, Dann Thomas, Vince Argondezzi, Michael Bair and Brian Murray, and first appeared in Young All-Stars #1 (June 1987). Übermensch was a Nazi super-agent of Axis Amerika.

=== Second version ===
The second version (also known as Shepherd) was created by Joe Kelly and Duncan Rouleau, and first appeared in JLA #80 (June 2003). Übermensch was a member of Axis Amerika and the Society.

=== Third version ===
A third version (known as Reichsmark) was created by Geoff Johns, Alex Ross, and Dale Eaglesham, and first appeared in Justice Society of America (vol. 3) #2 (March 2007). A member of the Fourth Reich who fights against the Justice Society of America, he is a metahuman who has indestructible metal skin and turns anyone he touches into statues. Alongside Captain Nazi and Baroness Blitzkrieg, Reichsmark attacks many of the JSA's members' descendants before being killed by Damage.

== Ubu ==
Ubu is the name of a lineage of several people who are members of the League of Assassins and serve Ra's al Ghul. Created by writer Dennis O'Neil and artist Neal Adams, the character first appeared in Batman #232 (June 1971).

=== Ubu in other media ===
- Ubu appears in series set in the DC Animated Universe (DCAU):
  - Ubu appears in Batman: The Animated Series, voiced by Manu Tupou in the episode "The Demon's Quest" and George DiCenzo in "Avatar".
  - Ubu appears in the Superman: The Animated Series episode "The Demon Reborn", voiced by Michael Horse.
- Ubu appears in Batman: Dark Tomorrow, voiced by Dean Elliott.
- Ubu makes non-speaking cameo appearances in Batman: The Brave and the Bold.
- Ubu makes a non-speaking appearance in Batman: Under the Red Hood.
- Ubu appears in Young Justice, voiced by Fred Tatasciore.
- Ubu appears in Son of Batman, voiced by Bruce Thomas.
- Ubu appears as a character summon in Scribblenauts Unmasked: A DC Comics Adventure.
- Ubu makes a non-speaking appearance in Batman vs. Teenage Mutant Ninja Turtles.
- Ubu appears in the DC Super Hero Girls episode "#LeagueOfShadows".

== Doctor Ub'x ==
Doctor Ub'x is a H'lvenite, a rodent-like alien originating from the planet H'lven in Space Sector 1014. Possessing great intelligence and an equally great desire for power, Ub'x leaves his homeworld and creates a powerful military force known as the Crabster Army that conquers most of the planets in the sector. Turning his attention to his homeworld, Ub'x easily conquers H'lven and sentences the leader of the resistance, Ch'p, to death. Ch'p is visited by one of the Guardians of the Universe, who gives him a Green Lantern power ring. Using the ring, Ch'p drives Ub'x's forces from the planet.

Ub'x creates the Sucker Stick, a device designed to match the power of a Green Lantern, just before the events of "Crisis on Infinite Earths". Realizing that the timeline is being rewritten, Ub'x uses the Stick to transform himself into energy, which prevents him from being erased from history.

Ub'x follows Ch'p to Earth. Once he defeats the Green Lanterns, Ub'x regains his physical form and prepares to kill Ch'p. However, he relents after realizing that Ch'p is among the few individuals who remember the original, pre-Crisis timeline. Ub'x and Ch'p form a truce and eventually became friends.

Ub'x relocates to Africa, where he experiments on wildlife to create a species similar to the H'lvenites. Accompanying Ch'p on a mission to the 58th century, Ub'x discovers that his experiments have prospered and remains in the future to watch over them.

== Ultivac ==
Ultivac is a giant robot built by scientists Felix Hesse and Floyd Barker, who went rogue against its creators. It was ultimately convinced to give up its villainous ways by the Challengers of the Unknown before one of its creators destroyed it nevertheless. It was magically re-created to oppose the Forgotten Heroes.

== Ultraa ==
Ultraa is a DC Comics character, originally the first superhuman on Earth Prime. The original first appeared in Justice League of America #153 (April 1978), he was created by Gerry Conway and George Tuska. The current Ultraa first appeared in Justice League Quarterly #13 (Winter 1993), written by Kevin Dooley and drawn by Greg LaRocque. A new version of Ultraa appears in Grant Morrison's The Multiversity project.

Ultraa's origin is very similar to Superman's, in that he was born on an alien world and sent to Earth to escape its destruction. He landed in the Australian Outback and was raised by Indigenous Australians. Ultraa joins the Justice League of Earth-One, but they turn against him following an incident where he uses a ray gun to make the members of the League and the Injustice Gang apathetic.

As a result of their second encounter with Ultraa, the League imprisons him in a "stasis cube" prison of Superman's design. He is later released by an alien hive mind known as the Over-Complex. A dispirited Ultraa adopts the civilian guise of Jack Grey and becomes a busboy. He is manipulated by Joe Parry, a down-and-out former opponent of the Justice League, but a heart-to-heart talk with Hawkman convinces him to break off the attack. Ultraa subsequently decides to move back to Australia.

Following Crisis on Infinite Earths, which reboots the continuity of the DC Universe, the original Ultraa is retconned out of existence. In Justice League Quarterly #13 (1993), Ultraa is reintroduced as a native of Almerac and the betrothed of Queen Maxima. Ultraa later appears as a member of the League Busters in Justice League International.

In The New 52, Ultraa is a metafictional character who resides on Earth-33, an analogue of the real world that has no metahumans. Ultra is Earth-33's sole metahuman and is empowered by the minds of those who read his comics.

== Umbaluru ==
Umbaluru is an Australian aboriginal man who travelled to Gotham City to retrieve a relic and avenge his people, coming into conflict with Batman. By the time of the events of Doomsday Clock, he had joined the Sleeping Soldiers, Australia's sanctioned superhero team.

== Umbrax ==
Umbrax is a sentient black sun that was powering the Ultraviolet Invisible Spectrum and became the first Ultraviolet Lantern.

== Usil the Sun Archer ==
Usil the Sun Archer is from Naples during fascist Italy. A counterpart of Green Arrow, he combines extraordinary archery skills with a variety of standard and trick arrows, and a member of Axis Amerika.
