= Young Allies =

Young Allies, in comics, may refer to one of the following superhero teams:

- Young Allies (DC Comics), a team made up of young superheroes featured in Young All-Stars published by DC Comics
- Young Allies (Marvel Comics), several superhero teams in stories published by Timely/Marvel Comics
