= Young All-Stars =

DC Comics characters

- Young All-Stars #12, artist Michael Bair.

Publication information
- Publisher: DC Comics
- First appearance: Young All-Stars #1 (June 1987)
- Created by: Roy Thomas (writer); Dann Thomas (co-plotter); Michael Bair (artist); Brian Murray (artist)

In-story information
- Member(s): Dan the Dyna-Mite; Flying Fox; Fury; Iron Munro; Neptune Perkins; Sandy; Tigress; Tsunami

The Young All-Stars are a team of fictional DC Comics superheroes. They were created by Roy Thomas, Dann Thomas, and Michael Bair, and introduced in Young All-Stars #1, dated June 1987. The team members Tsunami, Neptune Perkins, and Dan the Dyna-Mite were all introduced in previously published DC Comics stories. The team members Iron Munro, Flying Fox, and Fury were created for the series and intended to be analogs of the Golden Age versions of Superman, Batman, and Wonder Woman respectively.

Young All-Stars lasted for 31 issues, as well as one annual.

== Publication history ==
Young All-Stars was a follow-up to DC's popular 1980s series All-Star Squadron, created and written by Roy Thomas. All-Star Squadron retroactively introduced new stories into DC's Golden Age history, mainly during World War II. The series premise was that during World War II, President Franklin D. Roosevelt created Article X, a "superhero draft" that asked all active masked crime-fighters and superhuman adventurers to join forces as a special war-time group, the All-Star Squadron. The team's base was located on the grounds of the 1939 New York World's Fair. The team introduced brand new characters, used many of DC's Golden Age heroes, and also featured Golden Age heroes who weren't published by DC Comics in the 1930s and 1940s but had since been acquired by the company. The series was known for revising and expanding parts of the fictional history of DC Comics superheroes.

The series took place on the parallel world of Earth-Two, which DC had designated as the reality where stories published during the Golden Age of Comics took place. Modern day comics (starting with the mid-1950s) were said to occur in a reality called Earth-One. While the Golden Age Superman, introduced in 1938, had lived through World War II, the Earth-One Superman had not even been born until long after the war was over. While the modern-day Earth-One Wonder Woman was a superhero in her prime, new stories revealed that the Golden Age Wonder Woman of Earth-Two had fought Nazis during World War II, then later semi-retired, married her dear friend Steve Trevor, and had a daughter named Hyppolyta Trevor (who became a hero called Fury and joined a team of heroes known as Infinity, Inc.).

During the 1985-1986 series Crisis on Infinite Earths, Earth-Two and Earth-One, along with some other realities, merged into a new, unified reality with a revised history. The heroes of World War II now existed in the same timeline as modern heroes, simply operating at an earlier time. While it was not a major problem to establish that certain characters such as the Golden Age Flash (Jay Garrick) and the later Flash (Barry Allen) could co-exist and both operate during different time periods, this explanation did not work for heroes with direct counterparts. Golden Age heroes such as Superman, Wonder Woman, Batman, Robin, and Green Arrow all of whom had the same secret identities, same basic origin stories, and largely similar supporting casts as their modern day counterparts. For this reason, these particular Golden Age heroes, and some others, had to be removed from the history of the new, unified timeline. This also meant the canon of the All-Star Squadron stories was now questionable, since the Golden Age versions of those same heroes made multiple appearances in the series. To clear the slate after Crisis on Infinite Earths and re-launch the franchise, All Star Squadron was canceled with issue #67 and replaced with a successor series, Young All-Stars.

Young All-Stars featured the previously existing characters Neptune Perkins and Dan the Dyna-Mite as stand-ins for the Golden Age versions of Aquaman and Robin, respectively. The rest of the team consisted of brand new characters created to be spiritual and contextual analogs for other eliminated Golden Age characters: Iron Munro stood in for Superman, Flying Fox stood in for Batman, and Fury stood in for Wonder Woman (this new character was now said to be the mother of the modern day hero Fury who served in Infinity, Inc.). Another character included in the team was Tsunami, who had been originally introduced in All-Star Squadron.

Young All-Stars issue #1 also introduced a team of villains called Axis Amerika, a subversive US-based organization that included agents of the Axis Powers. The members of the group were all evil analogs for the Golden Age versions of Superman, Wonder Woman, Batman, Robin, Green Arrow, and Aquaman. The villains included: Übermensch, Gudra the Valkyrie, Der Grosshorn Eule (Horned Owl) and his son/sidekick Fledermaus, the archer Usil, and the amphibious wolfman called Sea Wolf.

== Fictional history ==
While carrying out a mission for the All-Star Squadron, TNT and Dyna-Mite are ambushed by members of Axis America. During the battle, TNT is killed. Dyna-Mite, who barely survives, is aided by Arn Munro, a young man who possesses superhuman physical abilities. Iron Munro, Fury (Helena Kosmatos), Flying Fox, and Dan help fend off an Axis America attack on Squadron headquarters. The four young heroes meet up with Neptune Perkins and Tsunami while heading out to the West Coast to track down Axis America. Later on they meet and recruit Tigress.

After routing the forces of Axis America, the five young heroes are invited to join the All-Star Squadron on a probationary basis. They fight foreign and local Axis threats. They also meet an older group of metahumans collected by the Allied countries known as The Young Allies whose members come from Russia, China, France, and England. The Young All-Stars disband after being absorbed into the All-Star Squadron.

== Members ==
- Dan the Dyna-Mite, the former sidekick of TNT with explosive powers.
- Flying Fox, a First Nations hero from Canada. He replaces Batman from All-Star Squadron.
- Fury (Helena Kosmatos), an Amazon heroine empowered by the ancient Furies. She replaces Wonder Woman from All-Star Squadron.
- Iron Munro (Arn Munro) is the super strong, nearly invulnerable son of Hugo Danner, the title character from Philip Wylie's 1930 novel Gladiator. He replaces Superman from All-Star Squadron.
- Neptune Perkins, a water-breathing World War II hero who would later marry Tsunami and become a U.S. Senator. He replaces Aquaman from All-Star Squadron.
- Tigress (Paula Brooks), a cat burglar turned hero. In the post-World War II era, she would become the villainous Huntress.
- Tsunami, a water-breathing and water-controlling hero. She describes herself as a Japanese-American kibei, and later marries Neptune Perkins.

== See also ==
- Justice Society of America
- Freedom Fighters
- Seven Soldiers of Victory
- The Crusaders

== Resources ==
- The Unofficial History of ...The Young All-Stars
- JSA Chronology entry for the Young All-Stars
- Roy Thomas, ed., The All-Star Companion, Vol. 2 (2006). ISBN 1-893905-37-3
