= Hugo Danner =

Fictional character in Gladiator

- From cover of the 1949 edition of Gladiator.

Publication information
- Publisher: Alfred A. Knopf; Marvel Comics; Wildstorm
- First appearance: Gladiator (1930)
- Created by: Philip Wylie

In-story information
- Team affiliations: WWI Western Front allied forces French Foreign Legion
- Notable aliases: Le Colorado
- Abilities: Superhumanly dense tissue grants: Superhuman strength, leaping, stamina, speed and durability; Accelerated healing factor

Hugo Danner is a fictional character and the protagonist of Philip Wylie's 1930 novel Gladiator. Born in the late 19th century with superhuman abilities via prenatal chemical experimentation, Danner tries to use his powers for good, making him a precursor of the superhero. However, Danner grows disillusioned with his inability to find a permanent outlet for his great strength, and dies frustrated.

Apart from Wylie's novel, the character has also appeared in a feature film and publications by Marvel Comics and DC Comics. Comedic actor Joe E. Brown portrayed him in a 1938 movie adaptation of the book. Decades later the character starred in an adaptation titled "Man-God" in Marvel's black-and-white comics magazine Marvel Preview #9 (Winter 1976). He next appeared in DC's standard color comic book Young All-Stars in 1988 and 1989, as the estranged father of an illegitimate son named Iron Munro. In 2005, he returned in the comic book miniseries Legend, published by the DC imprint Wildstorm. Here Danner, in the late 1960s, fights as a U.S. Army supersoldier in the Vietnam War rather than as a super Legionnaire in World War I.

== Publication history ==
=== Creation ===
In early February 1930, Wylie described the inspiration for Danner's creation in the introduction to one of the earliest printings of Gladiator:

A temperamental consciousness of material force brought Hugo Danner into being. The frustration of my own muscles by things, and the alarming superiority of machinery started the notion of a man who would be invincible. I gave him a name and planned random deeds for him. I let him tear down Brooklyn Bridge and lift a locomotive. Then I began to speculate about his future and it seemed to me that a human being thus equipped would be foredoomed to vulgar fame or to a life of fruitless destruction. He would share the isolation of geniuses and with them would learn the inflexibility of man's slow evolution. To that extent Hugo became symbolic and Gladiator a satire. The rest was adventure and perhaps more of the book derives from the unliterary excitement of imagining such a life than from a studious juxtaposition of incidents to a theme"

=== Development ===
The novel begins during the closing years of the 19th century, as Colorado science Professor Abednego Danner searches for a way to improve the innate weaknesses of human biology and create a new "race that doesn't know fear — because it cannot know harm". After 14 years of research he finally discovers "alkaline radicals" that vastly improve "muscular strength and the nervous discharge of energy". Following very successful animal testing, which yields super-strong tadpoles and a bulletproof kitten capable of taking down cattle as prey, he injects this super-serum into the womb of his pregnant wife, Matilda. Hugo Danner is born on Christmas several months later.

His parents imbue him with a strong moral compass during his formative years and warn him never to use his great strength in anger. However, during kindergarten, Danner nearly kills the school's bully in a one-sided fight after being assaulted by the child. This event brands him as an outsider in the eyes of the other children. Because they treat him with such abhorrence, his only solace comes in the form of unleashing his powers within the Colorado wilderness (uprooting trees, throwing huge boulders, leaping to the mountain tops, etc.). This stigma eventually wears off, though, and is forgotten by the time Danner enters high school.

Danner leaves Colorado after graduating high school to attend Webster University. There, he becomes an unstoppable football star and the most popular boy in school. During the summer months, he works as a circus strong man and even enters a fight competition for money. However, after returning to college and accidentally killing another player during a game, he quits school and becomes a sailor. A year later, his ship is trapped in France by the outbreak of World War I in 1914.

He and a fellow American sign up with the French Foreign Legion and find themselves on the battlements after a short training period. He eventually reveals his powers to his Legionnaire superiors, who believe him to be a devil or supernatural Native American, and he is given free rein to roam the battlefield and kill as many German soldiers as he possibly can. Stories of "Le Colorado" (The Colorado) quickly spread from trench to trench and Danner becomes a sort of mythical hero. After a short stint in an American Legionnaire unit, Danner grows weary of war and devises a plan with an airplane:

He would drive it far into Germany. When its petrol failed, he would crash it. Stepping from the ruins, he would hasten on in the darkness, on, on, like Pheidippides, till he reached the centre of the enemy government. There, crashing through the petty human barriers, he would perform his last feat, strangling the Emperor, slaying the generals, pulling buildings apart with his Samsonian arms, and disrupting the control of the war.

However, the Treaty of Versailles is signed the very day he prepares to leave, and so he is forced to abort his mission, much to his dismay. He returns to the United States and works in a number of professions — steel mill worker, bank teller, farm hand, and disarmament lobbyist — but his unique stature among mortal men forever brings him grief. He eventually offers his services to a noted history professor preparing a Mayan archaeological dig and travels with the group to the Yucatan Peninsula.

During the trip, Danner wonders if the Mayans and Egyptians had discovered the same formula as his father, "which could be poured into the veins of the slaves [who built the pyramids], making them stronger than engines". There, he works as the head steward of the hired Mayan helpers and proves himself an asset to the team. But when a mishap reveals his great strength to the professor, the elderly man suggests Danner use his father's formula to create a new race of men known as the "Sons of Dawn", who will use their powers to right the world's wrongs. The idea appeals to him at first, but Danner fears that these sons would also be hated by humanity for their superiority and treated much the same as himself. In the end, he climbs a mountain amidst an oncoming thunderstorm, and is struck dead by lightning while praying to God. The formula is lost in the resulting fire. The professor discovers his charred remains three days later and buries him among the Mayan ruins.

== Powers and abilities ==
Even during his early years, Danner displays superhuman strength. He demolishes his wooden crib as a newborn, saves a man's life by lifting a two-ton supply wagon at 6 years old, and uproots entire trees at 10. He progressively grows stronger as he gets older. During his twenties, he can stop and kill a charging bull with a single punch, bend a railroad rail, lift a seventy-five millimeter howitzer cannon singlehandedly, lift a car and its driver singlehandedly, rip open a 5-foot-thick (1.5 m) bank vault, and easily catch a falling 8,000-pound block of stone.

Danner's physical strength extends to his legs, allowing him to leap great heights and distances. At age 10 he can leap 40 feet (12 m) into the air and run faster than a train. During his freshman year in college, he easily breaks a world track record, though he actually doesn't run at his full speed. While in the service of the French Foreign Legion in World War I, he traverses 37 miles (60 km) round trip in just thirty minutes (a speed of about 148 miles per hour (238 km/h)); all while carrying 2,000 pounds (910 kg) of food, water, and ammunition for his unit. Despite his great strength, he is still susceptible to fatigue.

He first learns of his body's superior resistance to physical injury during the war. Bullets and bayonets glance off his tough skin. He believes he can even survive a plane crash. The only weaponry capable of penetrating his skin at the time are the largest artillery shells. Although, he still feels the effects of the elements, sweating under the heat of the sun and freezing during winter. Danner's only vulnerability is lightning, which ultimately kills him.

Danner's bodily tissues have a somewhat greater density than those of an ordinary human being. Though he has an athletic build, his strength is far greater than what his frame would naturally allow. People guess him to be 155 pounds (70 kg), but he actually weighs 211 pounds (96 kg). During his stint as a sailor, he goes pearl diving with the natives of Cristobal and is able to dive deeper and stay under longer because of his density.

His body can heal damaged tissue much faster and more extensively than an ordinary human can. He collapses from exhaustion and wounds sustained from artillery shells after he goes berserk against the Germans to avenge a friend's death. When he wakes up in an army hospital, he finds "his wounds had healed without the necessity of a single stitch". Long periods of comatose sleep (up to 20 hours) and the consuming of huge meals also aid in his regenerative process.

== In other media ==
Movie poster

=== Film ===
Danner was portrayed by comedic actor Joe E. Brown in the 1938 film The Gladiator, which loosely adapted science-fiction drama as a comedy, and, among the many changes, renamed the protagonist "Hugo Kipp". The film begins when Kipp wins a large sum of money in a contest and decides to return to college. There, he is talked into joining the football team and fails to live up to his athletic father's legendary reputation. But after a Professor Danner (Lucien Littlefield) injects Kipp with a serum that gives him superhuman strength, he becomes an unstoppable player and wins the heart of the self-centered quarterback's girlfriend (June Travis). In the end, he faces Man Mountain Dean in a wrestling match, but the serum runs out at the last minute.

=== Comics ===
Marvel Preview #9 (Winter 1976). Cover art by Earl Norem

In comics, Danner first appeared in the 52-page story "Man-God", by writer Roy Thomas and artist Tony DeZuniga (credited as Antony DeZuniga) in Marvel Comics' Marvel Preview #9 (Winter 1976). Only the first half of the novel is adapted.

Danner next appeared in DC Comics' Young All-Stars #9-11 (Feb.-April 1988) and #28-31 (Aug.-Nov. 1989), as the estranged father of Iron Munro, his illegitimate son. Munro was not a character or even a possibility in the original novel, where, as Danner's ailing scientist father explained, "the effect of the process is not inherited by the future generations. It must be done over each time".

In this storyline, Munro comes into possession of his father's diary and learns of Danner's troubled life as the 20th century's first metahuman. After having read the diary, Munro turns to the government's secret Project M, demanding to know the location of the "Dinosaur Island" mentioned by Danner. There he meets a person who leads him instead to Maple White Land in South America. Munro is surprised when he finds his father is alive. Danner apparently faked his death in the Yucatan and briefly returned home to have a one-night stand with his former high school sweetheart Anna Blake. The resulting union bore Munro, who took his surname from his mother's new husband (who believed the child to be his own). Danner has, by this time, succeeded in rearing the first generation of the Sons of Dawn. He later reveals to the Young-All Stars that the villain Übermensch has stolen the formula in order to create his own race of supermen.

Munro is forced to oppose his father when Danner orders the Sons of Dawn to attack a Brazilian city. The combined might of the All-Star Squadron defeats the Sons of Dawn and Danner is killed during the final battle.

Danner starred in the four-issue miniseries Legend (April–July 2005) by writer Howard Chaykin and artist Russ Heath, published by the DC imprint Wildstorm. Cover blurbs on the first two issues read, "Inspired by Philip Wylie's Novel Gladiator". The story now takes place in the second half of the 20th century, with the Vietnam War replacing World War I, but the story remaining for the most part intact.

Hugo Danner appears in the 2015 graphic novel Nemo: River of Ghosts, written by Alan Moore and illustrated by Kevin O'Neill. Hugo Danner is portrayed as the first and only genuine American superhuman. After World War I, disillusioned with humanity, Danner seeks to create a civilization of superhumans like himself in the ruins of Utopia. However, Clark Savage Sr. (father of Doc Savage) hires Hugo Hercules to stop him, fearing competition for his own superhuman son. Danner and Hercules engage in an epic battle, which ends with Danner's death, his head crushed by a headbutt from Hercules. Danner's death is kept secret, and the U.S. government begins faking the existence of superhumans in the 1920s, since the only real one had "disappeared."

== Comparison with later heroes ==
No confirmation exists that Superman co-creator Jerry Siegel was influenced by Gladiator. He and co-creator Joe Shuster began developing Superman in 1934.

Superman as originally published came from an unnamed planet whose inhabitants were millions of years more evolved than humans. When they reached maturity, "the people of his race became gifted with titanic strength". Their advanced evolution and great strength accounted for Superman's superhuman abilities on earth. As Siegel described them: "When maturity was reached, he discovered he could easily: leap 1/8th of a mile; hurdle a twenty-story building...raise tremendous weights...run faster than an express train...and that nothing less than a bursting shell could penetrate his skin!"

Siegel and Shuster compared Superman's strength and leaping abilities to those of an ant and a grasshopper, respectively, as did Abednego for his son. Danner also claims descent from a far-off land (Colorado) inhabited by a race of super-strong, indestructible men. In order to keep his true "experimental" origins a secret, he tells his Legionnaire superiors, "[Colorado is a] place in America. A place that has scarcely been explored. I was born there. All the men of Colorado are born as I was born and are like me. We are very strong. We are great fighters. We cannot be wounded except by the largest shells." Other examples of similarities include both of their biological fathers are scientists (Jor-El and Abednego), both grow up in rural settings (Smallville and Indian Creek, Colorado), both are imbued with a strong moral compass from a young age both lift cars over their heads, and both hide their powers from the world.

One critic noted that Danner's "creation and upbringing by a scientist father recall Doc Savage's origins" and a "prototype for the famous scene in which the fledgling Spider-Man defeats a hulking wrestler to make money is found in Wylie's novel; Hugo's bout in the ring is similar to that in the Spider-Man's origin story in 1962's Amazing Fantasy #15."
