= Michael Bair =

American comic artist (born 1938/9)

- Born: Michael A. Hernandez; January 14, 1961 (age 65)
- Areas: Penciller, Inker
- Notable works: As a penciler: Alpha Flight; As an inker: Hawkman; Identity Crisis.

Michael A. Hernandez is an American comics artist also known by the pen name Michael Bair, who is best known for his work as an inker. His work includes Marvel Comics' Alpha Flight, and DC Comics' Hawkman. He is best known for inking Rags Morales' pencils since 2002, most notably on the miniseries Identity Crisis.

== Biography ==
Bair started his career in the early 1980s, pencilling a "Stormy Tempest" story in Star*Fems #2 for AC Comics/Paragon Publications in 1982. In 1983, he began working for the leading American comic book publishers, DC Comics and Marvel Comics. Bair's first work for "DC was the 'Huntress' backup in Wonder Woman and then JSA Vs America, [sic]" all of which work, he recalls, "was pencilling." He produced a range of penciled and inked covers for the company over the following ten years; for Marvel he penciled a backup story for Moon Knight #31 (May 1983), but focused on non-Marvel work until the mid-to-late 1980s.

Between 1984 and 1985, Bair worked for Eclipse Comics, drawing covers and interior pencils for Aztec Ace, pencils and inks for Crimson Dawn, and backup features for Sabre.

For these few early years of his career, Bair says he "used my legal name which is Michael Hernandez. I chose to change to Bair because it's my mother's maiden name and you have to understand, there are a lot of Hernandez's in comics- I've even got chided over it [laughs]. It was simple to go with Bair — there are no other Bairs in comics — though I did get a call from Mike Barr over it [laughs]."

=== Pencils ===
==== DC Comics ====
Bair's major work in the 1980s was providing interior pencils and often inks for DC Comics. In particular, he had a long run working on a number of Golden Age-connected characters with Roy Thomas. Penciling Infinity, Inc. gave way to some of his most notable works, co-creating the Young All-Stars and Young Allies in the pages of Young All-Stars with Roy and Dann Thomas.

Bair also worked as a penciler on Firestorm, and his inks appeared in Captain Atom in the late 1980s, during which time he inked the Catwoman mini-series written by Mindy Newell. Bair contributed work to DC's guidebook titles, including Secret Origins and Who's Who: The Definitive Directory of the DC Universe from 1985 to 1989.

==== Marvel Comics ====
Between 1987 and 1995, Bair drew a number of covers for Marvel Comics, pencilling, inking and occasionally painting several. Producing most of his Marvel work during the early 1990s, Bair provided the art for a story in the 1990 Daredevil Annual. Writer Gregory Wright commented "I don't think that story could have worked at all if it weren't for the terrific artwork of Michael Bair". Bair then pencilled Alpha Flight for a year, and provided pencils to various Marvel Comics series including The Avengers Annual #20, Nick Fury, Agent of S.H.I.E.L.D. vol. 2 #12, The Punisher War Journal #34, and Uncanny X-Men #280.

He contributed pencils and inks to the Wild Cards anthology for Epic Comics, before - c. 1991 - switching mostly to inking duties, including on Sleepwalker and What If...? #36. He provided both pencils and inks to the first five issues of the Hellstorm series in 1993.

==== Other ====
Around 1994, Bair ceased his association with Marvel and DC in favor of Valiant/Acclaim, pencilling and inking issues and covers for X-O Manowar, Bloodshot, and Blood and Roses, among others.

=== Inks ===
Bair recalled in 2004 that, "[t]he first ten years of my career was all pencilling — I didn't know how to ink". Having, early in his career, shown samples to Jim Shooter (then Marvel's Editor-in-chief), Bair recalled nearly twenty years later that Shooter "said, 'Those pencils look pretty good', and then when I showed him my inking, he said, 'But stay away from the inks'".

These comments, he says, "felt like a personal challenge, so on my own I worked on my inks and creators like Mark Texeira, who I worked with in the past, strongly influenced how I approached inking. The more I learned about inks, the more I wanted to ink my own work — there's a reason why you don't see too many people pencilling and inking their own work — it's just too much to do on a monthly schedule". The time-consuming nature of this led Bair to largely move away from penciling in favor of inking the pencils of others.

During the mid-1990s, Bair inked David W. Mack at Caliber Press and William Tucci at Crusade Entertainment on their respective comics: Kabuki and Shi. After working for various smaller publishers, Bair penciled and inked a couple of comics for Harris Comics' Vampirella.

==== Back to DC ====
In mid-1997, Bair working for DC Comics again, cementing his almost-exclusive switch from pencils to inks with the miniseries The Kents over pencils by Timothy Truman and half of JLA: Year One with series artist Barry Kitson. He inked most of the first two years of the James Robinson/David Goyer-written JSA revival over pencils by regular series artist Steve Sadowski. In 2002, Bair inked covers by Tom Grummett for Power Company, before first teaming with penciller Rags Morales on Geoff Johns and James Robinson's Hawkman relaunch. Morales said "when I saw the magic that Michael Bair added to my work, I knew I had to stick with this dude". Johns compared his artistic collaborators to the stars of the book, saying "there are four stars to this book. Hawkman, Hawkgirl, Rags Morales and Michael Bair... Michael Bair and Rags together make you feel every punch and smash in the series, but at the same time convey the utter beauty of Hawkgirl, who's graceful but is also very vicious."

Bair continued to ink Morales' pencils on Identity Crisis (2004–2005) and a few issues of Wonder Woman with writer Greg Rucka. Bair signed an exclusive contract with DC in 2004.

He later inked issues in Grant Morrison's Seven Soldiers metaseries, including two covers and one interior of the Bulleteer miniseries with penciler Yanick Paquette. In addition to his continued work with Morales, including a two-issue story in the JSA: Classified series, Bair co-inked Dave Gibbons' pencils in the Green Lantern Corps series, and on the cover of the Rann-Thanagar War: Infinite Crisis Special (April 2006), in which he provided some interior inks. In 2007, Bair inked Morales' pencils on Peter Tomasi's run on Nightwing.

=== Influence ===
In a tour of his studio, artist Simone Bianchi highlighted a photograph, explaining "it is a photo of myself and Mike Bair that was taken in New York in Summer 2004: that was a very important moment in my career and I owe a lot to this great artist and friend so I like having it in my studio."

== Awards ==
Identity Crisis was selected by the Young Adult Library Services Association (YALSA)'s 2007 recommended list of Great Graphic Novels For Teens and was nominated for the 2005 "Best Single Issue or Story" Harvey Award.

== Bibliography ==
Interior comics work includes:

- "When You Wish Upon A...?" (pencils as Michael A. Hernandez, with writer/inker Bill Black, in Star*Fems #2, AC Comics/Paragon Publications, 1982)
- "Fly the Friendly Skies" (pencils as Michael A. Hernandez, with writer Steve Ringgenberg and inks by Kevin Dzuban, backup story in Moon Knight #31, May 1983, Marvel Comics)
- Huntress (pencils as Michael A. Hernandez, with writer Joey Cavalieri, backup stories in Wonder Woman, DC Comics):
  - "Straitjacket!" (inks by Rick J. Bryant, in Wonder Woman #305, July 1983)
  - "It's...Madness" (inks by Rick J. Bryant, in Wonder Woman #306, August 1983)
  - "Side Effects" (inks by Frank Giacoia, in Wonder Woman #307, September 1983)
  - "Pressure" (inks by Frank Giacoia, in Wonder Woman #308, October 1983)
- Aztec Ace (as Michael A. Hernandez, with writer Doug Moench, Eclipse Comics):
  - "The Mexica Serpent" (pencils, with inks by Nestor Redondo, in Aztec Ace #1, March 1984)
  - "Lightning Snatched From the Tyrant of Time" (pencils, with inks by Nestor Redondo, in Aztec Ace #2, April 1984)
  - "Picnics at Midnight" (breakdowns, with pencil finishes and inks by Ron Harris, in Aztec Ace #9, January 1985)
- Secret Origins (with writer Roy Thomas, DC Comics):
  - "The Secret Origin of the Golden Age Sandman" (pencils, with co-author Dann Thomas and inks by Steve Montano in Secret Origins #7, 1986)
  - "The Secret Origin of the Golden Age Hourman" (pencils, with co-author Dann Thomas and inks by Mike Gustovich in Secret Origins #16, 1987)
  - "The Secret Origin of Doctor Fate" (pencils, with inks by Bob Downs in Secret Origins #24, 1988)
  - "The Secret Origin of the Justice Society of America" (pencils, with inks by Bob Downs in Secret Origins #31, 1988)
  - "The Secret Origin of the Grim Ghost" (pencils/inks, in Secret Origins #42, 1989)
- Who's Who: The Definitive Directory of the DC Universe (pencils/inks, with various, DC Comics):
  - "Sandman I" (in Who's Who: The Definitive Directory of the DC Universe #XX, October 1986)
  - "Zyklon" (in Who's Who: The Definitive Directory of the DC Universe #XXVI, April 1987)
- All-Star Squadron #63 (pencils, with writer Roy Thomas and inks by Mike Machlan, DC Comics, November 1986)
- Who's Who in Star Trek #1–2 (pencils/inks, with writer Allan Asherman, DC Comics):
  - "Nurse Chapel" (in Who's Who in Star Trek #1, March 1987)
  - "Deltans" (in Who's Who in Star Trek #1, March 1987)
  - "Miramanee" (in Who's Who in Star Trek #2, April 1987)
  - "Natira" (in Who's Who in Star Trek #2, April 1987)
- Nightmask #7 (pencils, with writers Roy Thomas and Dann Thomas and inks by Pablo Marcos, Marvel Comics, May 1987)
- Infinity, Inc. #39, 50–53, Annual #1 (pencils, with writers Roy Thomas and Dann Thomas and inks by Bob Downs, DC Comics, 1987–1988)
- Young All-Stars (with writers Roy Thomas and Dann Thomas, DC Comics)
  - Young All-Stars #1, 6, 11–12, and 31, (pencils, 1987–1989)
  - Young All-Stars #16–22, Annual #1 (pencils/inks, 1988–1989)
  - Young All-Stars #31 (pencils; pin-up pencils/inks, November 1989)
- Catwoman (inks, with writer Mindy Newell and pencils by J. J. Birch, four-issue mini-series, DC Comics, 1989)
- Green Arrow #25–26 (inks, with writer Mike Grell and pencils by J. J. Birch, DC Comics, 1989)
- Daredevil: "Two Schizos" (pencils/inks, with writer Gregory Wright, in Daredevil Annual #6, Marvel Comics, 1990)
- Alpha Flight #87–91, 93–95, 97–100 (pencils, with Fabian Nicieza and inks by Mike Manley and Chris Ivy, Marvel Comics, 1990–1991)
- Sleepwalker #5, 7, 11–12 (inks, with writer Bob Budiansky, and pencils by Bret Blevins (#5, 7, 11) and Joe Quesada (#12), Marvel Comics, 1991–1992)
- Hellstorm: Prince of Lies #1–5 (pencils/inks, with writer Rafael Nieves, Marvel Comics, 1993)
- Shi (Crusade Comics):
  - The Way of the Warrior #2–8 (inks, with writers Peter Gutierrez/William Tucci and pencils by William Tucci, 1994)
  - Senryaku #1 (pencils, with writer Gary Cohn, 1995)
- Cynder (Immortelle Studios):
  - Cynder #1–3 (1995)
  - Cynder II #1 (1996)
  - Cynder Annual #1 (May 1996)
- Kabuki (Caliber Comics, reprinted in Kabuki Classics):
  - Circle of Blood (inks, with script and pencils by David W. Mack, 1995)
  - Masks of the Noh #3 (pencils/inks, with writer David W. Mack, 1996)
- Tomoe #1 (inks, with writers Peter Gutierrez and William Tucci and pencils by William Tucci, Crusade Comics, 1996)
- Vampirella:
  - "The Blood Red Game" (pencils/inks, with writer Grant Morrison, in Vampirella: 25th Anniversary Special, Harris Comics, 1996)
  - Vampirella vs Hemorrhage (pencils/inks, with writers Ian Edginton and Thomas E. Sniegoski, three-issue mini-series, Harris Comics, 1997)
  - "Vampirella/Lady Death" (inks, with writer David Conway and pencils by Louis Small Jr., one-shot, Chaos Comics, 1999)
- The Kents #1–8 (inks, with writer John Ostrander and pencils by Timothy Truman, DC Comics, 1997–1998, tpb, 272 pages, 2000, ISBN 1-56389-513-7)
- JLA: Year One #4–6, 9, 10, 12 (inks, with Brian Augustyn and Mark Waid and pencils by Barry Kitson, DC Comics, 1998)
- JSA (with writers David Goyer and James Robinson, DC Comics)
  - JSA #1–5, 7–10 (inks, with pencils by Steve Sadowski and Derek Aucoin, DC Comics, 1999–2000)
  - JSA #11 (breakdowns/inks, with pencil finishes by Buzz, June 2000)
  - JSA #13–20 (inks (#19 with co-inker Keith Champagne), with pencils by Steve Sadowski, DC Comics, 2000–2001)
  - JSA #22–27 (inks, with pencils by Steve Sadowski and Rags Morales, DC Comics, 2001)
- Hawkman #1–12, 15–17, 20–23, 25 (inks, with writers Geoff Johns and James Robinson and pencils by Rags Morales, DC Comics, 2003–2004)
- Identity Crisis (inks, with writer Brad Meltzer and pencils by Rags Morales, seven–issue limited series DC Comics, 2004–2005)
- Wonder Woman #215, 217, 221, 223 (inks, with Greg Rucka and pencils by Rags Morales, DC Comics, 2005–2006)
- Seven Soldiers (all with writer Grant Morrison)
  - Bulleteer #1 (inks, with Yanick Paquette, DC Comics, January 2006)
  - Mister Miracle #2 (inks, with pencils by Billy Dallas Patton, DC Comics, February 2006)
- Green Lantern Corps #4–5 (inks, with script and pencils by Dave Gibbons, DC Comics, 2006)
- JSA: Classified #19–20 (inks, with writer Scott Beatty and pencils by Rags Morales, DC Comics, 2007)
- The Origin of the Justice Society of America" (inks, with writer Mark Waid and pencils by Don Kramer, in 52, DC Comics, 2007)
- Nightwing #140–145, 148 (inks, with Peter Tomasi and pencils by Rags Morales, DC Comics, 2008)
- Captain Britain and MI: 13 #7–8 (inks, with writer Paul Cornell and pencils by Leonard Kirk, Marvel Comics, 2009)

=== Covers ===
Cover work includes:

- Nightmask #5, 7 (Marvel Comics, March–May 1987)
- JSA #45–47 (pencils/inks, DC Comics, April–June 2000)
- Seven Soldiers: Bulleteer #1, 4 (inks, with pencils by Yanick Paquette, DC Comics, January/May 2006)
- Nightwing #140–143 (inks, with pencils by Rags Morales, DC Comics, 2008)

Preceded by Mike DeCarlo	"Huntress" feature in Wonder Woman artist 1983	Succeeded by Tim Burgard
Preceded by Mark Bagley	Alpha Flight penciller 1990–1991	Succeeded by Tom Morgan
Preceded by n/a	JSA inker 1999–2001	Succeeded by Christian Alamy
Preceded by n/a	Hawkman vol. 4 inker 2002–2004	Succeeded by Lary Stucker
