= TNT (character) =

Publication information
- Publisher: DC Comics
- First appearance: Star-Spangled Comics #7 (April 1942)
- Created by: Mort Weisinger

In-story information
- Alter ego: Thomas N. "Tex" Thomas
- Team affiliations: All-Star Squadron; Seven Soldiers of Victory
- Partnerships: Dan the Dyna-Mite
- Abilities: After coming in contact with Dan the Dyna-Mite: Enhanced strength, speed and resistance to injury Heat generation

TNT is a fictional character appearing in American comic books published by DC Comics. TNT and his sidekick Dan the Dyna-Mite were created by Mort Weisinger for DC Comics, and made their debut in Star Spangled Comics #7 (April 1942).

The "human hand grenades" had a short lived career during the Golden Age of Comic Books, reappearing occasionally in reprint form during the 1970s, returning in Super Friends #12, and appearing from time to time in All-Star Squadron and its Post-Crisis sequel, Young All-Stars.

== Fictional character biography ==
=== Pre-Crisis ===
TNT and Dan the Dyna-Mite are the secret identities of chemistry teacher and track coach Thomas N. "Tex" Thomas and his student Daniel Dunbar. While working with "radioactive salts", they discover they are charged with atomic energy. Thomas is charged with positive energy, while Dunbar is charged with negative energy. Thomas makes a pair of rings which keeps the energy dormant until they are touched together, at which point the pair gains enhanced strength, speed, and resistance to injury, and the ability to generate different forms of energy. Thomas generates heat, while Dan can generate bursts of electricity. The series ran through Star-Spangled Comics #23 (August 1943).

=== Post-Crisis ===
TNT was revived as part of Roy Thomas's All-Star Squadron, and its spin-off, The Young All-Stars. After TNT and Dyna-Mite had been active for a few months, they are summoned by the All-Star Squadron to participate in their first general meeting. Their participation seems to have been limited to attending meetings and little else until April 1942, when Liberty Belle, as chairperson of the All-Stars, asks TNT and Dyna-Mite to look into Axis espionage activity in Colorado. Here, they meet future All-Star member Iron Munro, but TNT is killed by Gudra the Valkyrie, a supernatural agent of Adolf Hitler. TNT is posthumously awarded the Medal of Honor, leaving Dyna-Mite to work with Munro and other members of the Young All-Stars. Keeping Thomas' ring, Dan finds he can activate his powers by slamming both rings together.

In 2010's DCU: Legacies #2, TNT and Dyna-Mite are revealed to have been founding members of the Seven Soldiers of Victory. How this retcon affects their histories, such as the previously established death of TNT and Dyna-Mite's Young All-Stars stint, has not yet been revealed.

=== Current version ===
The latest version of the character is featured in Grant Morrison's Seven Soldiers project. Calling himself Dyno-Mite Dan, Harris D. Ledbetter makes an online purchase of what he believes are TNT and Dan the Dyna-Mite's rings, and joins five other heroes in Seven Soldiers #0. Later, he is killed with the rest of his team. His rings are actually working fakes made by Cassandra Craft.

=== DC Universe ===
In Dark Nights: Death Metal, TNT is revealed to have died some time prior before Batman resurrects him with a Black Lantern ring.

== Powers and abilities ==
When his powers are unleashed, TNT possesses super-strength, enhanced speed, and resistance to injuries. He can also do energy blasts.

=== Equipment ===
TNT possesses a special ring that helps contain his powers when in his civilian form. When his ring touches Dan the Dyna-Mite's ring, their powers are unleashed.

== Enemies ==
TNT had his own rogues gallery:

- "Brainy" Beggs - a criminal leader.
- Aces Keenan - a gambler and criminal.
- Blast - a saboteur.
- Bruiser Blane - a criminal who was looking for gold in Placer Gulch.
- Clumsy Charlie - the leader of a gang who are bad at committing crimes.
- Crime Clown - a clown that led a criminal gang.
- Dwarf - a tiny crime lord.
- Ebenezer Oglum - a miserly old man who fell in with some gangsters.
- Herr Streicher - a Nazi.
- Judson Cross - a criminal who stole money for a charity dedicated to helping blind children.
- Mother Goose - George Ready is the leader of the Mother Goose Mob.
- Mr. Heyler - a Nazi who manipulated Clumsy Charlie and his gang.
- Parrot - Harry Hicks is a masked criminal who uses a parrot that has poison on its claws.
- Phineas Smythe - an art dealer.
- Posey - a bandit leader who was nicknamed the "Blooming Bandit".
- Sparkler Rattigan - a criminal who used a special static electricity machine to keep Thomas and Daniel from transforming into TNT and Dan the Dyna-Mite.
- Test Tube Gang - a criminal gang that uses new types of acids and explosives for their crimes.

== Reception ==
American Comic Book Chronicles says that the TNT and Dan the Dyna-Mite series "had potential, but consistently fell flat, limited space and unimaginative writing its chief problems".

== Other versions ==
TNT is mentioned in the 1993 four issue mini-series The Golden Age, written by James Robinson and drawn by Paul Smith. This series is set during the period of McCarthyism and, much as he did in The Young All-Stars, TNT is said to have died during World War II.
