= Stephen Sadowski =

Canadian artist

- Area: Artist
- Notable works: JSA
- Spouse: Shane Rooks

Stephen Sadowski (born 1967, in British Columbia) is a Canadian artist, working primarily as a penciler and cover artist on superhero comics. He is known for penciling JSA, the 1999 revival of the Justice Society of America written by James Robinson and David S. Goyer. His other work has included Avengers/Invaders, Red Sonja, and Warlord of Mars for Dynamite Entertainment; and Fairest, and Fables: The Wolf Among Us for DC's Vertigo imprint.

Sadowski is openly gay.

One of Sadowski's Art, of Artemis as Tigress.
