= Fury (DC Comics) =

Any one of three DC Comics superheroes

- The Lyta Hall incarnation of Fury as depicted in Infinity, Inc. #16 (July 1985). Art by Todd McFarlane (penciler) and Tony DeZuniga (inker).

Publication information
- Publisher: DC Comics
- First appearance: Wonder Woman #300 (February 1983)
- Created by: Roy Thomas; Danette Thomas; Ross Andru

In-story information
- Full name: Hippolyta "Lyta" Trevor-Hall
- Team affiliations: Infinity, Inc.
- Notable aliases: Lyta Hall; Donna of Amazon Island (Earth 2)
- Abilities: Superhuman strength, speed and endurance Enhanced senses and durability Animal empathy Regeneration; Invulnerability to magic

Fury is the codename shared by three DC Comics superheroes, two of whom are mother and daughter, both of whom are directly connected with the Furies of mythology, and the third who is an altogether different character.

Lyta Hall appears in the drama series The Sandman (2022), portrayed by Razane Jammal.

== Fictional character biography ==
=== Hippolyta "Lyta" Trevor ===
==== Pre-Crisis ====
Originally Fury was Hippolyta "Lyta" Trevor, the daughter of the Golden Age Wonder Woman and Steve Trevor; Lyta inherited all her mother's powers. She was introduced in Wonder Woman (vol. 1) #300. Like most Golden Age-related characters at the time, Lyta lived on the parallel world of "Earth-Two".

Lyta later adopted the identity of Fury, named after the Furies of mythology, and was one of the founding members of Infinity Inc. She began a relationship with her teammate Hector Hall, the Silver Scarab, whom she had met as a child; they reunited as classmates at UCLA. Shortly after their decision to marry, Hector was possessed by an enemy of his father, Hawkman, and killed. Fury was pregnant with Hector's child, and it was instrumental in the Silver Scarab's defeat. In 52, a new Earth-2 with a similar history is created, and Lyta Trevor serves as a member of the Justice Society Infinity.

Lyta, like all her Infinity Inc. counterparts, briefly made an appearance during the DC Convergence crossover. Powerless and trapped on Telos, Lyta Trevor became a police officer before regaining her powers and taking on a Post-Crisis version of Jonah Hex. Eventually, Lyta and all of Infinity Inc. take over for the Justice Society on a returned Earth-2.

==== Post-Crisis ====
Following the 1985 miniseries Crisis on Infinite Earths, the Golden Age Wonder Woman retroactively no longer existed, and Lyta was now the daughter of the newly created character Helena Kosmatos, the Golden Age Fury (a Greek superheroine and a member of the All-Star Squadron, and an avatar of the Fury Tisiphone) and had been raised by Joan Trevor (née Dale), also known as Miss America, and her husband Derek.

For a while, Lyta served with Infinity, Inc., but eventually left the team to bear a child. At home, Lyta was visited by a resurrected Hector Hall. After his death, Hall mistakenly believed he had been chosen as the Guardian of Dreams called the Sandman following the suicide of Garrett Sandford and joined the real Sandman in the Dream Dimension.

After suffering a nervous breakdown, Lyta Hall searches for her baby Daniel in The Sandman #60; pencils by Marc Hempel, inks by D'Israeli.

In The Sandman, it was revealed that the Dream Dimension was a portion of the Dreaming enclosed by Brute and Glob during Morpheus' imprisonment. Upon Morpheus' return, Hector's soul was released and Lyta was sent back to Earth, where she gave birth to their son. Afterwards, Lyta blamed Morpheus for Hector's death; but Morpheus visited the child, named him Daniel, and claimed him as an heir. When Daniel was later captured by Loki and Robin Goodfellow, Lyta invoked the Three's Erinyes aspect to destroy Morpheus, whereupon Daniel became the new Lord of the Dreaming.

Hector and Lyta's spirits depart into the Dreaming in JSA #80, art by Don Kramer.

Lyta's story continued in the graphic novel Sandman Presents: The Furies. She appeared in JSA where she was reunited with Hector, now reincarnated as Doctor Fate. At some point between the graphic novel and her return in JSA, Mordru captured Lyta and imprisoned her in Fate's amulet. Once freed, she rejoined her husband and regained her memories of Daniel.

During the Spectre's quest to destroy magic, he banished Doctor Fate and Lyta to a freezing mountain, later identified as part of Hell. In JSA #80, Lyta recalls being visited by Daniel in a dream, where he offers to bring Lyta and Hector to the Dreaming for all eternity; because Hector is dying, Lyta accepts the offer.

=== Helena Kosmatos ===
Fury
- Helena Kosmatos as "Golden Age" Fury, as she appeared on the cover of Young All-Stars #12, art by Michael Bair and Mark Beachum.

Publication information
- Publisher: DC Comics
- First appearance: Infinity Inc. #35 (February 1987)
- Created by: Roy Thomas; Danette Thomas; Todd McFarlane

In-story information
- Full name: Helena Kosmatos
- Team affiliations: Young All-Stars; All-Star Squadron; Amazons of Themyscira
- Abilities: Superhuman strength, leaping, speed, and durability Magical document provides ageless immortality Ties to the Fury Tisiphone provide a secondary form, granting her greater strength, invulnerability, flight, and heat vision that can survive in the vacuum of space Wears a suit of magical armor

Helena Kosmatos was a new character named "Fury", created to replace the Golden Age Wonder Woman as Lyta Trevor's biological mother. She began appearing in Thomas' Young All-Stars, a book set in World War II, and her backstory was revealed in Secret Origins #12. She was a Greek national who had learned her brother was co-operating with Italian fascists who previously killed her father. When she confronted her brother with this revelation in front of their mother, it was too much for the widow to take and she died of an instant heart attack. Wishing revenge upon her brother, she was approached by Tisiphone, one of the Eumenides or Furies, who gave her a suit of magic armor, which increased her strength, speed and stamina. When angered, she became an avatar of Tisiphone, and it was in this state that she killed her brother.

At one point, the Amazon Queen Hippolyta took over the role of Wonder Woman and traveled back in time to aid the JSA against the Nazis. During this time, Helena began to look to Hippolyta as a mother figure and believed that she was indeed the daughter of the Amazon queen, despite the knowledge that her true parents were killed during the war. When Queen Hippolyta returned to her own time, Helena sought a magical means to gain eternal youth; this was accomplished via a magical document that, if destroyed, would revert Helena to her true age and possible death. After this was done, Helena met Hippolyta's true daughter Diana and took an immediate dislike to her. By this point, Helena's mental state was near collapse, as she began to behave irrationally. Diana took her to Themyscira, where Hippolyta addressed Helena as a daughter to support her fragile psyche. After Hippolyta's death during the Our Worlds at War storyline, Helena went into mourning and much of her mental imbalance was resolved.

=== Erik Storn ===
In 52, a new Infinity Inc. created by Lex Luthor was introduced, with a male hero going by the name of Fury. The newest Fury had been given blackened skin and claws after submitting to Luthor's Everyman Project. After Luthor's arrest and after the project was shut down, Erik's powers were disabled. He developed a stutter, which is later revealed to be a defense mechanism to hide his desire for self-castration. It is later revealed that Erik gained the ability to assume a female form, who is dubbed Amazing Woman.

Erik is later found and tortured by Codename: Assassin, having discovered and shared with Jimmy Olsen precious information about Project 7734. Erik puts Jimmy in contact with Natasha Irons before dying.

== Powers and abilities ==
Fury has superhuman strength, speed and endurance, enhanced senses and durability, animal empathy, and regenerative healing factor. She is also invulnerable to magic.

== Other versions ==
Donna as Fury in Earth 2: Society #2.

In September 2011, The New 52 rebooted DC's continuity. In this new timeline, Fury made her debut in Earth 2 #8 (2013). She is the daughter of Wonder Woman of Earth-2 and Steppenwolf and the last surviving Amazon after the others were killed during an Apokoliptian invasion. In the series Earth 2: Society (2016), it is revealed that Fury's name is Donna, making her a counterpart of Donna Troy.

This new version of the character appears to be more powerful than the previous versions. Fury and Big Barda are evenly matched in strength, as well as skill. In World's Finest Huntress/Power Girl Annual #1, a 'First Contact Prelude' issue, Donna is seen trading blows and going toe to toe with Power Girl. It is also mentioned that she has received training from Barda and Steppenwolf.

As Darkseid's forces converge closer to Earth-2, Mister Miracle convinces Fury to combat Darkseid's forces. Following the destruction of Earth-2 and the events of Convergence, Fury takes on the role of Wonder Woman. At the end of the series Earth 2: Society, Fury uses Pandora's Box to recreate Earth-2.

== In other media ==
Aresia as she appears in Justice League.

- A character inspired by the Lyta Trevor and Helena Kosmatos incarnations of Fury called Aresia appears in the Justice League episode "Fury", voiced by Julie Bowen. As a child, she and her mother were forced to flee their homeland on a refugee ship, but it was attacked and sunk by pirates. After being separated from her mother and left drifting for days, Aresia eventually washed ashore on Themyscira, where she was taken in by Hippolyta and raised as an Amazon. During the last stage of her Amazon rebirth, Aresia secretly left the island to exact revenge on all men, believing this will make her a hero in the other Amazons' eyes. With help from Lex Luthor's Injustice Gang, she creates a virus in a bid to kill all men. Aresia intends to continue her plot until Wonder Woman and Hawkgirl drive off her allies and jam the bomber's doors. The Justice League and Hippolyta escape, but Aresia dies in the subsequent plane crash. The Justice League later discovers Aresia's notes and uses them to create an antidote for her virus.
- An original incarnation of Fury inspired by the Erik Storn incarnation named Rosa appears in Young Justice, voiced by Quei Tann. Similarly to Storn, Rosa is a member of Lex Luthor's Infinity Inc., which is later reworked into the Infinitors. While not stated in the series, series developer Greg Weisman confirmed Rosa to be a transgender woman when he retweeted a question from a Twitter user.
- Lyta Hall appears in The Sandman, portrayed by Razane Jammal.
