= Infinity, Inc. =

Fictional team of superheroes

Infinity Inc.
- Cover of Infinity Inc. #1, depicting the original Infinitors, art by Mike Machlan.

Publication information
- Publisher: DC Comics
- Schedule: Monthly
- Format: Ongoing series
- Publication date: March 1984 – June 1988
- No. of issues: 53
- Main character(s): Sylvester Pemberton the original Star-Spangled Kid; Silver Scarab; Fury; Northwind; Nuklon; Jade; Obsidian; Power Girl; Huntress; Brainwave Jr.

Creative team
- Created by: Roy Thomas; Jerry Ordway; Mike Machlan
- Written by: Roy Thomas; Dann Thomas
- Penciller: Various

Infinity, Inc. is a team of superheroes appearing in American comic books published by DC Comics. The team is mostly composed of the children and heirs of the Justice Society of America (JSA), making them the Society's analogue to the Teen Titans. Created by Roy Thomas, Jerry Ordway, and Mike Machlan, Infinity, Inc. first appears in All-Star Squadron #25 (September 1983). There is also an eponymous comics series starring the group that ran from March 1984 through June 1988.

== Publication history ==
Roy Thomas and his wife Dann Thomas wrote the series throughout its run. Artists who worked on the series included Jerry Ordway, Don Newton, Todd McFarlane, Michael Bair and Vince Argondezzi. The group is assembled by Sylvester Pemberton, the original Star-Spangled Kid, in Infinity Inc. #1, when several JSA protégés were denied admission to the JSA and instead formed their own group. Members of Infinity, Inc. are known as Infinitors. The series ended in 1988 with the death of the Star-Spangled Kid (by then known as Skyman) at the hands of Solomon Grundy, and the group presumably disbanded shortly thereafter. Several members of Infinity, Inc. went on to supporting roles in other comic series: Fury filled a pivotal role in The Sandman and is the mother of Daniel Hall, while Hourman, Obsidian, Nuklon (as Atom Smasher), Silver Scarab (as Doctor Fate), and Power Girl joined the 21st-century incarnation of the JSA. The series originally took place on the parallel world of Earth-Two, but in 1986 it was merged with the rest of DC continuity following Crisis on Infinite Earths. From then on, Infinity, Inc. became Los Angeles' superteam with the Outsiders and was involved in a crossover with the New Teen Titans.

== Fictional team biography ==
=== Infinity, Inc. (vol. 1, 1984–1988) ===
==== Formation ====
Hector Hall, Lyta Trevor, Norda Cantrell, and Albert Rothstein decide to adopt identities of their own and apply for membership in the Justice Society of America (JSA). They adopt the codenames Silver Scarab, Fury, Northwind, and Nuklon respectively. They are turned down, but apply again with Jennie-Lynn Hayden and Todd Rice, Alan Scott's children. Star-Spangled Kid decides to leave the JSA to create a new group and they are joined by Power Girl, Huntress, and Brainwave Jr. They call themselves Infinity, Inc.

Infinity, Inc. first faces the JSA, turned evil by the Ultra-Humanite. They defeat the JSA and the Ultra-Humanite. In a press conference to garner media attention for the new team, the members publicly divulge their secret identities, and Hector announces his engagement to Lyta. Star-Spangled Kid forms a partnership with Los Angeles to commission his team as for-hire protectors and purchases Stellar Studios to revitalize its production of movies.

==== Clashes with Helix ====
Fury is kidnapped in an extortion attempt by the villain group known as Helix: the original members are Arak the Wind-Walker, Baby Boom, Kritter, Mister Bones, Penny Dreadful, and Tao Jones. They are defeated by the Infinitors, but manage to escape.

Later, the second Wildcat, Yolanda Montez, learns that she is a cousin of Helix member Carcharo and that they are products of the same genetic experiments of Doctor Love as Helix. The two teams battle to a stalemate. Bones is arrested, but the others escape.

==== Crisis on Infinite Earths ====
Infinity, Inc. is involved in the Crisis on Infinite Earths event, which results in three new superheroes—Yolanda Montez as Wildcat, Rick Tyler as Hourman, and Beth Chapel as Doctor Mid-Nite—joining the team.

==== The Silver Scarab saga ====
Even with all of his friends at Infinity, Inc., Hector leaves the group after a fallout with Lyta. Shortly afterward, the team learns that the JSA has disappeared. The other members notify people associated with JSA members of the society's disappearance. Professor James Rock contacts Hector, though he is presumed to be long dead. Northwind travels to Hall Mansion to confront Hector, only to find him already under Hath-Set's manipulations, who used Rock's alias.

Hector kidnaps Fury, and he and Hath-Set uncover the Eye of Ra, a powerful and ancient weapon. Northwind returns and leads Infinity, Inc. into a final confrontation with the Silver Scarab at Hall Mansion, which, when burned down, reveals a topless pyramid inside. While Northwind confronts the Silver Scarab in a duel, Nuklon saves Fury.

The Eye of Ra denies the Silver Scarab control and flies away. The Silver Scarab is not pure enough in the eyes of Seketh, the Egyptian god of Death, for the pureness of Hector's heart lives on in his unborn child with Lyta. Therefore, he is not fully cleansed of his goodness and the Silver Scarab is thrown away by the Eye's power. Northwind can close the Eye of Ra while Hath-Set escapes. Infinity, Inc. mourns the loss of Hector, and Northwind and Fury leave the team after his funeral.

A pregnant Lyta goes home to spend time with her parents. When Nuklon goes to visit her to profess his love, she tells him she is not over Hector yet and that she only has friendly feelings for him. Disappointed, he discovers that there is a prowler sneaking around the property. Nuklon captures him and discovers him to be Hector Hall, the new Sandman. Hector reveals that his spirit wound up in the dream dimension after the scarab ejected it from his body. The former Sandman, Garrett Sanford, died after years of service and his assistants Brute and Glob conscripted Hector to replace him. They put Hector into Garrett's body and gave him a new life. He can only come out of the dream stream for one hour a day, but it is enough for him and Lyta to rekindle their relationship.

==== Death in the Family ====
During Hector and Lyta Trevor-Hall's wedding, Harlequin (Marcie Cooper) uses trickery to make Bones and Skyman meet in Solomon Grundy's room. She then deceives Grundy into grabbing Bones' arm and using him to kill Skyman with his cyanide touch. Upset, Bones leaves and Infinity, Inc. finds him with Helix. Doctor Love has gained control of Helix and orders them to kill Bones, but the group turns on Love and kills him instead. Helix leaves in disgust, telling Bones he is no longer one of them, but the Infinitors grant him full membership in the team. The Infinitors continue on in Skyman's memory, but disband some time after.

=== Infinite Crisis ===
A post-Infinite Crisis version of the original Infinity, Inc. appears in Justice Society of America (vol. 3) Annual #1 in 2008, and is known as the Justice Society Infinity after it merges with its world's Justice Society of America. The Earth-2 versions of Silver Scarab, Fury, Jade, and Northwind are members, but their Superman is missing, their Flash is retired, and their Green Lantern (Alan Scott) is dead.

=== JSA: Black Reign ===
The closest that Infinity, Inc. has come to reforming is when Brainwave (under Mister Mind's thrall), Atom Smasher, Northwind, Nemesis, and Eclipso (who at the time was being controlled by the second Wildcat's cousin Alex Montez), were Black Adam's army in Khandaq. Black Adam mentions in an internal monologue that he had also thought of recruiting Power Girl for the group to further strengthen the Infinity, Inc. ties.

=== 52 ===
Cover art for 52 #21, featuring Luthor's Infinity, Inc. Art by J.G. Jones.

In the aftermath of Infinite Crisis, Lex Luthor clears his name and resurfaces as a legitimate businessman. He offers a metagene-based therapy, called the "Everyman Project", to regular people to allow them to develop superpowers. The therapy spawns six perfect specimens, to whom Luthor gives the identities purchased from the Pemberton Estate. He calls the new team Infinity Inc., and creates Starlight (Natasha Irons, the team's leader), a new Nuklon, a male Fury, a new Skyman, Everyman, and Trajectory.

Unbeknownst to the team, Luthor can "shut off" any of the team's powers at any time, as he does to Trajectory during a battle, causing her death at the hands of Blockbuster. Trajectory is replaced by Matrix, a pin-up model who displays superhuman strength and invisibility, similar to the original Matrix.

A new version of Jade with plant-based powers debuts with the team on Thanksgiving Day, which leads to the team being attacked by an angry Obsidian, the brother of the original Jade, who died. Alan Scott intervenes and breaks up the fight. Infinity, Inc. then claims that the older heroes will soon be replaced.

This version of Infinity, Inc. makes frequent appearances in the local media, acting both as a commercial stunt for the Everyman Project, and as a control system against rogue metahumans spawned from the Project itself.

Natasha begins to collect evidence against Luthor and the Everyman Project for Steel and enlists Skyman to help her. Skyman is later killed by Everyman, who then assumes his identity, and reveals Natasha's duplicity to Luthor. Luthor captures Natasha as bait to lure Steel and reveals that he has used the exo-gene therapy on himself and now possesses the same powers as Superman. Recruiting the Teen Titans, John Henry storms LexCorp to rescue Natasha.

The Titans take on Nuklon and the others while Irons faces Everyman and Luthor. Luthor severely injures Irons and impales him with his own hammer before Natasha can destroy Lex's exo-gene with an electromagnetic pulse from Steel's hammer, allowing him to be knocked out easily. The remaining members of Infinity, Inc. are taken into custody while Natasha and John Henry reunite.

Nuklon, Jade, Matrix, and Fury appear in the "World War III" storyline, where Alan Scott asks them to help in the final push against Black Adam. They refuse and flee the battlefield.

=== Infinity Inc. (vol. 2, 2007 – 2008) ===
Infinity Inc. (vol. 2)
- Cover of Infinity Inc. (vol. 2) #1 (November 2007). Art by Max Fiumara.

Publication information
- Publisher: DC Comics
- Schedule: Monthly
- Format: Ongoing series
- Publication date: November 2007 – October 2008
- No. of issues: 12
- Main character(s): Steel; Vaporlock; Double Trouble; Amazing Woman; Vanilla; Empathy

Creative team
- Written by: Peter Milligan
- Artist(s): Max Fiumara (#1–2); Matt Camp (#6–7); Pete Woods (#8–10)
- Penciller(s): Max Fiumara (#3–5); Travel Foreman (#3); Javier Aranda (#11–12)
- Inker(s): Matthew Southworth (#3–5); Dom Regan (#6–7); Javier Enebral (#11–12)

The new Infinity Inc. team, from the promotional cover art for Infinity Inc. (vol. 2) #5. Art by Max Fiumara.

Dan DiDio revealed at a DC Nation panel in Los Angeles that a new Infinity, Inc. ongoing series would debut in September 2007 with John Henry Irons as the main character. The book was written by Peter Milligan with art by Max Fiumara.

The first issues focuses on Natasha Irons (formerly Starlight), Erik Strom (formerly Fury), and Gerome McKenna (formerly Nuklon), a year after the end of the Everyman Project. Natasha is living with her uncle John Henry Irons and is in psychotherapy along with Erik, who refers to it as "our national religion," and Gerome. Another longtime patient, teenager Dale Smith, attacks his therapist and realizes his powers as a psychic vampire. He takes the name "Kid Empty". It is revealed that a side effect of the exogene therapy is that once the exogene is suppressed, the energies unleashed by the therapy remain, re-enabling the metagene differently. As a result, Natasha finds herself turning into a mist-like substance, McKenna gains the ability to duplicate himself, and Strom gains a strong, overconfident female alter-ego. The group recruits Mercy Graves and Lucia, an Everyman subject who can psychically inflict pain on others. In #8, the team gains official costumes and codenames, and goes on their first mission.

In issue #10, Mercy admits she is not ready to be on a team and leaves. Issue #11 begins a two-issue arc that ties into the Dark Side Club.

DeSaad, under the alias "Bud Fogel", secretly manipulates McKenna (now using the codename of "Double Trouble") by nurturing a third personality created from McKenna's base and repressed instincts, and promising it the opportunity to take full control.

When the splintered McKenna personality can wrest control over the main body (as shown when McKenna's main personality is transported in DeSaad's labs, while his duplicate attempts to force himself on Lucia), the Infinitors try to stop him. However, the plan is revealed to be a trap. The duplicate fatally wounds McKenna to possess his body, but disappears when McKenna's strength weakens. The other subjects are trapped in a machine that is designed to take away the powers of the remaining Everymen without activating their metagene. DeSaad admits he was forced to this course of action because the Everymen, even after turning into metahumans, are undetectable from Darkseid's minions, and they could be a wild card during the planned Final Crisis.

As a side effect of the machine, the Infinitors vanish. Steel, who arrives too late, swears he will resume his search for Natasha.

Infinity, Inc. reappeared briefly in the third issue of the Terror Titans mini-series, imprisoned by DeSaad. Towards the end of the miniseries, an undercover Miss Martian tips Irons off about their imprisonment in the Terror Titans' headquarters, leading to their release.

== Membership ==
=== Infinity Inc. ===
==== Proposed members ====
In the original pitch for the Infinity, Inc. series, creators Roy Thomas and Jerry Ordway had planned on using a young gay male as a new Harlequin.

In an interview with Alter Ego, Ordway explains: "Northwind is shown—but at his side [...] is a new, young, male Harlequin, who Jerry's notes suggest might become comics' first gay character. Or we could just assume it. Not a bad idea, and maybe we should have played it that way; but we were already going to have two Green Lantern-derived heroes in Infinity, Inc."

La Garro appearing alongside the founding Infinitors in a promotion for Infinity, Inc. from All-Star Squadron #28.

In promotional material appearing in All-Star Squadron #28, a Catwoman-like figure, riding what is referred to as a cat-cycle, appears alongside the Infinity, Inc. group. A caption refers to her as "La Garro", but she never appears in any of the team's adventures, or its comics under this name. She was later developed into the future Infinitor, the second Wildcat (Yolanda Montez).

Sandy Hawkins, also known as Sandy the Golden Boy, sidekick to the Sandman, is also referred to as a member, but does not end up being a member of the team. Thomas briefly toyed with the idea of giving the character superpowers based on Sandy's time as a sand-monster, but it was dropped because Thomas and others felt he could have ended up as the DC equivalent to Marvel's Sandman, which could have further confused a situation that had been a minor irritant between DC and Marvel from time to time. It was ultimately decided that with the cast as large as it had become Sandy was one of the characters to be dropped.

== Allies ==
- Pat Dugan - Formerly the hero Stripesy, he acted as team's mechanic.
- Solomon Grundy - He acted as Jade's protector.
- Jonni Thunder - A female private detective.

== Collected editions ==
Title	Material collected	Published date	ISBN
Infinity Inc.: The Generations Saga	Infinity Inc. (vol. 1) #1-4, All-Star Squadron #25-26, Annual #2	September 2011	978-0857684325
Crisis on Infinite Earths Companion Deluxe Edition Vol. 2	Infinity, Inc. (vol. 1) #18-25, Annual #1 and DC Comics Presents #86, Swamp Thing #44, Losers Special #1, Legends of the DC Universe: Crisis on Infinite Earths #1, Justice League of America #244-245, New Teen Titans (vol. 2) #13-14 and material from Detective Comics #558	May 2019	978-1401289218
Infinity Inc. Vol. 1: Luthor's Monsters	Infinity Inc. (vol. 2) #1-6	July 2008	978-1845768836
Infinity Inc. Vol. 2: Bogeyman	Infinity Inc. (vol. 2) #7-12	January 2009	978-1848560734
Convergence: Infinite Earths Book One	Convergence: Infinity Inc. #1-2 and Convergence: Action Comics #1-2, Convergence: Detective Comics #1-2, Convergence: Justice Society of America #1-2, Convergence: World's Finest #1-2	November 2015	978-1401258375

== In other media ==
- Infinity, Inc. appears in Young Justice, initially consisting of Trajectory, Fury, and Everyman. This version of the team was created by Lex Luthor to discredit the Outsiders and secretly assist the Light. After their connection to Luthor's criminal activities is exposed and their reputation is ruined, the Light reworks Infinity, Inc. into the Infinitors under Geo-Force's leadership and adds the size-shifting Kobold to the team.
  - The Infinitors appear in the tie-in comic miniseries Young Justice: Targets, with the addition of Lizard Johnny and Jet.
- Stargirl executive producer Geoff Johns revealed that the two-part episode "Infinity Inc.", which sees Mister Bones becoming inspired by the Justice Society of America to create his own superhero team, was meant to serve as a backdoor pilot for a spin-off series based on Infinity Inc.
