= All-Star Squadron =

Group of DC Comics fictional characters

- Cover of All-Star Squadron #31 (March 1984), art by Jerry Ordway.

Publication information
- Publisher: DC Comics
- First appearance: Preview: Justice League of America #193 (August 1981); First full appearance: All-Star Squadron #1 (September 1981)
- Created by: Roy Thomas; Rich Buckler; Jerry Ordway

In-story information
- Base(s): Trylon and Perisphere

The All-Star Squadron is a DC Comics superhero team that debuted in Justice League of America #193 (August 1981) and was created by Roy Thomas, Rich Buckler and Jerry Ordway. Although the team was introduced in the 1980s, its self-titled series took place in the 1940s, retroactively inserting their narratives into the fictional history of the DC Comics superheroes. The team included many of DC's Golden Age era characters, new characters, and other World War II superheroes which DC did not own during the 1940s but later acquired. The name "All-Star Squadron" was creator Roy Thomas' reference to All Star Comics, the series that introduced the Justice Society of America, the first comic book superhero team.

According to the series All-Star Squadron, US President Franklin Roosevelt creates a "superhero draft" called Article X during World War II. Article X asks all active American masked crime-fighters and superhuman adventurers to join forces as a single war-time organization, just as many American labor organizations did during World War II. In the canon of DC Comics, the Axis Powers used the mystical Spear of Destiny to create a "sphere of influence" over their occupied territories and surrounding areas during most of World War II. This sphere of influence caused superhumans, magically empowered people, and magic-users to fall under Hitler's control and take on some of his personality traits. For this reason, the All-Star Squadron focused its activities on protecting the US from invasion, super-villains, spies, and sabotage rather than risk their minds being controlled by the Axis Powers if they operated overseas in Europe or Asia.

After their introduction in Justice League of America, the team starred in the series All-Star Squadron which ran from 1981 to 1987. At different times, the organization's chairperson was Liberty Belle or Hawkman. A spin-off series entitled Young All-Stars began in 1987 and published 32 issues.

== Publication history ==
During the Golden Age of Comics (roughly 1935–1951), several comic books featured crime-fighters, "mystery-men", adventurers, and superheroes. DC Comics began publishing the anthology series All Star Comics (sometimes referred to as All-Star Comics) in 1940. In issue #3, DC had many of their superheroes join for dinner and share stories, declaring the gathering to be the first meeting of the Justice Society of America. The JSA was the first comic book superhero team and became the main feature of All Star Comics until it was canceled with issue #57 in 1951.

Writer Gerry Conway revived the All Star Comics series in 1976, continuing the original numbering by starting with issue #58. By this time, DC had established that its modern-day adventures took place in the universe of Earth-One, whereas DC's Golden Age stories during the 1930s and 40s occurred in a parallel reality called Earth-Two. While the Golden Age Superman, introduced in 1938, had lived through World War II, the Earth-One Superman had not even been born until long after the war was over. While the modern-day Earth-One Wonder Woman was a superhero in her prime, new stories revealed that the Golden Age Wonder Woman of Earth-Two had fought Nazis during World War II, then later semi-retired, married her dear friend Steve Trevor, and had a daughter named Hyppolyta Trevor (who became a hero called Fury and joined a team of heroes known as Infinity, Inc.).

The 1970s revival of All Star Comics involved some flashback stories, but most of the issues took place in the modern day, showing the Justice Society members as older heroes decades after World War II. Conway also included younger heroes in the group, such as Power Girl (an Earth-Two version of Supergirl). His hope was to later have the younger members star in a spin-off series of their own, forming a team that could be called the All-Star Squadron. Management at DC worried that the team's name would be abbreviated as A.S.S., and so the group's name was changed to the Super Squad.

A team known as the All-Star Squadron debuted years later in a special insert in Justice League of America #193 (August 1981). The team's official series All-Star Squadron then began the following month with the creative team of writer Roy Thomas, with artists Rich Buckler and Jerry Ordway. The comic book series lasted 67 issues from September 1981 to March 1987, with three annuals published as well.

In All-Star Squadron #1, series writer Roy Thomas published "An Open Letter to the Readers" wherein he described the impetus for the series. Namely, DC wanted a comic book telling tales of the Justice Society of America (JSA). The last series to do so was the second volume of All Star Comics, which lasted only seventeen issues from 1976 to 1979. Roy Thomas said that DC management gave him "a chance to write a return of the JSA". Instead of writing stories in the modern era of Earth-Two, Roy Thomas chose to set the series during World War II. Roy Thomas decided to include other Golden Age era characters that were not published by DC Comics during the 1930s and 40s but were acquired by the company in later years, such as the Quality Comics characters. All-Star Squadron established that most of these characters co-existed with the Golden Age DC heroes on Earth-Two.

In a nod to the original JSA adventures in All Star Comics, Thomas tried to include at least a cameo appearance by the Golden Age Hawkman in every issue, since he was the one hero to appear in every Golden Age issue of the original All Star Comics series, including the two issues that predated the formation of the Justice Society of America. Although Hawkman did not appear in every issue of the second All Star Comic series, Roy Thomas wanted to create a new streak for the character in All-Star Squadron. The artwork for issue #49 was printed without Hawkman's cameo included, making it the only issue of the series where he does not appear.

The All-Star Squadron is an example of "retroactive continuity" or "retcon", since the team was retroactively inserted into the history of DC superheroes and the series rewrote portions of DC canon published during the 1940s. The first known use of the term "retcon" was by Roy Thomas in the letter column of All-Star Squadron #20 (April 1983). Several story lines ironed out continuity errors, fleshed out characters' origins, explained inconsistencies in character development, and resolved lingering questions and plot threads. Roy Thomas had used the Marvel Comics series Invaders in a similar way to address and revise official Marvel fictional history. Several issues of the series offered detailed origin stories of various characters, sometimes with revised details. Characters who had origin issues dedicated to them included Amazing-Man, Starman, Doctor Fate, Liberty Belle, Robotman, Johnny Quick, and the Tarantula. The story arc in issues #32-33 detailed how the Freedom Fighters traveled from Earth-Two to Earth-X, an event indicated in an earlier Justice League story.

With so many characters to choose from, the creative team decided to concentrate on "quite promising characters who have been ignored or underplayed for years", instead of only those Earth-Two characters who had popular counterparts on Earth-One. For examples, All-Star Squadron did not focus much on the Earth-Two versions of Superman and Wonder Woman, nor on the Golden Age version of the Flash, Jay Garrick, whose counterpart Barry Allen was very popular as the Flash of Earth-One. Roy Thomas wrote: "If we lost the original GL, we gained the Earth-Two Robotman; if we dropped Jay (Flash) Garrick, we picked up on Johnny Quick; Liberty Belle could stand in for Wonder Woman till more super-powered ladies came along. We even tossed in an Earth-Two version of the venerable Plastic Man, whose series in Adventure Comics was just folding..."

When Rich Buckler left the series after the fifth issue, editor Len Wein hired artist Adrian Gonzales as a replacement and notified Roy Thomas with a note stating "You're going to like Adrian Gonzales". He drew the series for 13 issues, during which the team had a crossover with the Justice League of America. Jerry Ordway, who had inked the series since its start, became the series regular penciler starting with issue #19 (March 1983). He and Thomas then co-created the Infinity, Inc. team, introducing it in All-Star Squadron #25 (Sept. 1983).

All-Star Squadron #31 (1984) featured the group's first "full roster" general meeting, taking place at their headquarters. The All-Star Squadron HQ was depicted as the Trylon and Perisphere, actual structures in Flushing Meadows, Queens, New York, constructed for the 1939 New York World's Fair. The Perisphere contained the Squadron meeting hall, while the Trylon was retrofitted as an aircraft hangar/vertical launch platform. The All-Star Squadron had a robotic butler named Gernsback, based on the Elektro robots from the fair and named after science fiction publisher Hugo Gernsback.

During the 1985–86 series Crisis on Infinite Earths, Earth-Two and Earth-One, along with some other realities, merged into a new, unified reality with a revised history. The heroes of World War II now existed in the same timeline as modern heroes, simply operating at an earlier time. While it was not a major problem to establish that certain characters such as the Golden Age Flash (a man named Jay Garrick) and the later Flash (a man named Barry Allen) could co-exist and both operate during different time periods, this explanation did not work for heroes with direct counterparts, Golden Age heroes such as Superman, Wonder Woman, Batman, Robin, and Green Arrow all of whom had the same secret identities, same basic origin stories, and largely similar supporting casts as their modern-day counterparts. For this reason, these particular Golden Age heroes, and some others, had to be removed from the history of the new, unified timeline. This also meant the canon of several recent All-Star Squadron stories was now questionable, since the Golden Age versions of those same heroes made multiple appearances in the series.

To clear the slate after Crisis on Infinite Earths and re-launch the franchise, All Star Squadron ended with issue #67 and the series was succeeded by Young All-Stars. Since then, the All-Star Squadron has appeared in sporadic stories published by DC Comics. Article X was used again during the crossover Final Crisis when Earth's superheroes needed to unite against the forces of Darkseid and the evil New Gods.

In a 2025 interview, Thomas said of All-Star Squadron that "I always say two things. One is that was my favorite comic of all time to write, above Conan, Avengers, or anything, because it combined the superheroes and the history, two of my great passions. And the other thing is that ... there is a possibility that if it hadn't been for that damn Crisis on Infinite Earths ... we might have kept going, we'd be right up to three or four hundred issues by now."

== Fictional history ==
The All-Star Squadron battling Captain Marvel, art by Rich Buckler.

On the day of the bombing of Pearl Harbor, President Franklin Roosevelt gathered available superheroes—including members of the Justice Society of America, Freedom Fighters, and solo heroes—at the White House. He asked them to band together for the war as the All-Star Squadron to battle sabotage and keep the peace on the home front during World War II. The rationale for not using the Squadron in combat situations in the European or Pacific Theaters of War was that Adolf Hitler had possession of the Spear of Destiny, a mystical object that gave him control of any superheroes with magic-based powers or a vulnerability to magic (including Superman, Green Lantern, Doctor Fate and others) who crossed into territory held by the Axis powers.

At the time, many of the Justice Society members had been captured by the time-travelling villain Per Degaton with the help of JSA foes he had pulled back in time, but the available heroes were asked to first guard against a potential attack on the West Coast of the United States. Degaton himself used some stolen Japanese planes with hypnotized troopers to launch such an attack on San Francisco, hoping to change history by making the United States fight to a stalemate against Japan, enabling him to take over the world, so the new Squadron's first major mission was to stop the attack and rescue the captured heroes, who also became part of the new group. Due to Per Degaton going back in time after the JSA were freed they forgot his involvement, though the events were not wiped. America's entry into the war caused several of the members of the JSA to enlist, or be drafted in their civilian identities. These included Alan Scott, Starman, Hawkman, The Atom and Johnny Thunder.

In "The New Golden Age", it is stated that the Golden Age Aquaman was briefly a member of the All-Star Squadron.

== Creators ==
=== Writers ===
- Roy Thomas – #1–67 (Sept. 1981–March 1987); Annual #1–3 (1982–84)
- Gerry Conway – #8–9 (April–May 1982) (Steel section only)
- Paul Kupperberg – #41, 44 (Jan. 1985, April 1985)
- Mike Baron – #43 (March 1985)
- Dann Thomas – #46, 51, 53–55 (June 1985, Nov. 1985, Jan. 1986–March 1986)

=== Artists ===
- Rich Buckler – #1–5, 36 (Sept. 1981–Jan. 1982, Aug. 1984); Annual #3 (1984)
- Adrian Gonzales – #6–18 (Feb. 1982–Feb. 1983); Annual #1 (1982)
- Don Heck – #8–9, 65 (April–May 1982, Jan. 1987) (Steel section only for #8–9)
- Jerry Ordway – #19–26, 29 (March 1983–Oct. 1983, Jan. 1984); Annual #2–3 (1983–1984)
- Richard Howell – #27–28, 30, 40 (Nov. 1983–Dec. 1983, Feb. 1984, Dec. 1984); Annual #3 (1984)
- Rick Hoberg – #31–35, 38–39 (March 1984–July 1984, Oct. 1984–Nov. 1984); Annual #3 (1984)
- Arvell Jones – #37, 41–46, 50–55, 58–60, 67 (Sept. 1984, Jan. 1985–June 1985, Oct. 1985–March 1986, June 1986–Aug. 1986, March 1987)
- Keith Giffen – Annual #3 (1984)
- Carmine Infantino – Annual #3 (1984)
- Don Newton – Annual #3 (1984)
- Martin Nodell – Annual #3 (1984)
- George Pérez – Annual #3 (1984)
- Todd McFarlane – #47 (July 1985)
- Mike Harris – #48–49, 61 (Aug. 1985–Sept. 1985, Sept. 1986)
- Mike Clark – #51, 56–57, 60 (Nov. 1985, April 1986–May 1986, Aug. 1986)
- Tony DeZuniga – #62 (Oct. 1986)
- Michael Bair – #63 (Nov. 1986)
- Wayne Boring – #64 (Dec. 1986); Annual #3 (1984)
- Alan Kupperberg – #66 (Feb. 1987)

=== Cover artists ===
- Rich Buckler – #1, 3–6, 36 (Sept. 1981, Nov. 1981–Feb. 1982, Aug. 1984)
- Joe Kubert – #2, 7–18 (Oct. 1981, March 1982–Feb. 1983)
- Jerry Ordway – #19–33, 50, 60 (March 1983–May 1984, Oct. 1985, Aug. 1986); Annual #1–2 (1982–83)
- Rick Hoberg – #34–35, 37–39 (June 1984–July 1984, Sept. 1984–Nov. 1984); Annual #3 (1984)
- Arvell Jones – #40–44, 46, 52, 55, 58–59, 64–66 (Dec. 1984–April 1985, June 1985, Dec. 1985, March 1986, June 1986–July 1986, Dec. 1986–Feb. 1987)
- Tim Burgard – #45 (May 1985)
- Todd McFarlane – #47 (July 1985)
- Mike Harris – #48–49, 61–62 (Aug. 1985–Sept. 1985, Sept. 1986–Oct. 1986)
- Mike Clark – #51, 53–54, 56–57 (Nov. 1985, Jan. 1986–Feb. 1986, April 1986–May 1986)
- Michael Bair – #63 (Nov. 1986)
- Tom Grindberg – #67 (March 1987)

=== Editors ===
- Len Wein – #1–20, Annual #1 (Sept. 1981–April 1983)
- Roy Thomas – #21–67, Annual #2–3 (May 1983–March 1987)

=== Associate/assistant editors ===
- Mike W. Barr #1–9 (Sept. 1981–May 1982)
- Carl Gafford #10–16, Annual #1 (June–Dec. 1982)
- Nick Cuti #17–29, Annual #2 (Jan. 1983–Jan. 1984)
- Janice Race #32–58, Annual #3 (April 1984–June 1986)
- Barbara Randall #59–61 (July–Sept. 1986)
- Greg Weisman #62–67 (Oct. 1986–March 1987)

== Collected editions ==
Title	Material collected	Published date	ISBN
Showcase Presents: All-Star Squadron Vol. 1	All-Star Squadron #1–18, Annual #1 and material from Justice League of America #193	April 2012	978-1401234362
Crisis on Multiple Earths Vol. 6	All-Star Squadron #14–15 and Justice League of America #195-197, 207–209	June 2013	978-1401238223
Infinity Inc.: The Generations Saga	All-Star Squadron #25-26, Annual #2 and Infinity Inc. (vol. 1) #1-4	September 2011	978-0857684325
Crisis on Infinite Earths Companion Deluxe Edition Vol. 1	All-Star Squadron #50-60, DC Comics Presents #78, The Fury of Firestorm #41-42, Green Lantern #194-198	November 2018	978-1401274597
DC Finest: The Spectre: The Wrath of the Spectre	All-Star Squadron #27-28 (non-All-Star Squadron stories: Adventure Comics #431-440, Showcase #60-61, #64, The Spectre (vol. 2) #1-10, The Brave and the Bold #72, Ghosts #97-99)	September 2025	978-1799502814

== See also ==
- The Crusaders
- Freedom Fighters
- Justice Society of America
- Seven Soldiers of Victory
- Young All-Stars
