= Dann Thomas =

American comic book writer

- Born: Danette Maxx Couto; January 30, 1952 (age 74)
- Area: Writer
- Notable works: All-Star Squadron; Arak, Son of Thunder; Avengers West Coast; Infinity, Inc. Young All-Stars
- Spouse: Roy Thomas

Dann Thomas (born Danette Maxx Couto, January 30, 1952) is an American comic book writer and is married to comic book writer and editor Roy Thomas. She has at times collaborated with her husband on All-Star Squadron, Arak, Son of Thunder, the Crimson Avenger miniseries, and Avengers West Coast.

She married Roy Thomas in May 1981 and legally changed her first name from Danette in the early 1980s.

== Biography ==
Dann Thomas' earliest comic book credit appears on "The Sea of No Return" (credited as "Adapted from a story by Danette Couto") in Savage Sword of Conan #66 (July 1981). Her husband credits her with the original idea for Arak, Son of Thunder, noting, "Danette Couto (soon to be Dann Thomas) had this idea: What if a Native American had discovered Europe?" He also credits her with initiating the concept behind their series Captain Thunder and Blue Bolt (published by Hero Comics in 1987-88 and 1992) and writing most of the dialogue. She began co-writing the Arak title with issue #12 (Aug. 1982) and would work with Thomas on most of his projects afterwards. Roy Thomas explained in 2011 that "Dann and I co-wrote Infinity [Inc.] from the beginning, coplotting it, with Dann usually, if not always, doing the first draft on the script, which I then rewrote. Not that she was openly credited as co-writer right away; I had to take it slow in that area." Dann Thomas co-wrote Wonder Woman #300 (Feb. 1983) and, as Roy Thomas noted in 1999 "became the first woman ever to receive scripting credit on the world's foremost super-heroine." A rare example of Dann Thomas' solo writing appeared in the Wally Wood's T.H.U.N.D.E.R. Agents series published by Deluxe Comics. Roy Thomas' contractual obligations to DC Comics prevented him from working on the series but Dann Thomas was able to work on it.

Dann Thomas' last new comic book writing appeared in Cadillacs and Dinosaurs #9 (Nov. 1994), published by Topps Comics.

In 2003, she obtained her Masters of Arts degree from California State University. Her thesis was entitled "Comic Books 1938-1945: A Study of the Evolution of Attitudes Towards the Enemy Nations and Their Populations In American Comic Books During World War II." In it, she credits her "husband, Roy Thomas, for his encouragement and support, and for the use of his library of comics-related materials."

== Tributes ==
The super-heroine Firebrand of the All-Star Squadron takes her civilian name, Danette Reilly, from Dann Thomas. Dann Thomas co-wrote later issues of All-Star Squadron. Another character based upon Dann Thomas is a woman named Danette who appeared in the story "What If Conan the Barbarian Walked the Earth Today?" published in What If? #13 (Feb. 1979).

== Bibliography ==
=== Blue Comet Press ===
- Crime Smasher Special Edition #1 (1987)

=== Dark Horse Comics ===
- Cormac Mac Art #1–4 (1990)

=== DC Comics ===
- Action Comics Weekly #623–626 (Shazam backup feature) (1988)
- All-Star Squadron #46, 51–55, 58–59, Annual #3 (1984–1986)
- America vs. the Justice Society #1–4 (1985)
- Arak, Son of Thunder #12–50, Annual #1 (1982–1985)
- Captain Carrot and His Amazing Zoo Crew! #16 (1983)
- Crimson Avenger #1–4 (1988)
- Infinity, Inc. #1–53, Annual #1–2, Special #1 (1984–1988)
- Jonni Thunder a.k.a. Thunderbolt #1–4 (1985)
- Last Days of the Justice Society Special #1 (1986)
- The New Teen Titans vol. 2 #38 (1987)
- Secret Origins #5 (Crimson Avenger), #26 (Miss America) (1986–1988)
- Shazam!: The New Beginning #1–4 (1987)
- Wonder Woman #300 (1983)
- Young All-Stars #1–31, Annual #1 (1987–1989)

=== Deluxe Comics ===
- Wally Wood's T.H.U.N.D.E.R. Agents #1–2, 4 (1984–1986)

=== First Comics ===
- Alter Ego #1–4 (not to be confused with the magazine of the same name) (1986)

=== Hero Comics ===
- Captain Thunder and Blue Bolt #1–10 (1987–1988)
- Captain Thunder and Blue Bolt vol. 2 #1–2 (1992)

=== Marvel Comics ===
- The Avengers Annual #19–20 (1990–1991)
- Avengers Spotlight #37–39 (1990)
- Avengers West Coast #60–63, 65–94, 96, Annual #5–7 (1990–1993)
- Black Knight #1–4 (1990)
- Doctor Strange, Sorcerer Supreme #5–24, 26–40 (1989–1992)
- Eternals: The Herod Factor #1 (1991)
- Impossible Man Special #1 (1990)
- Iron Man Annual #11–12 (1990–1991)
- Marvel Super-Heroes vol. 2 #6–7 (1991)
- Nightmask #6–7, 10–12 (1987)
- Saga of the Sub-Mariner #1–12 (1988–1989)
- Savage Sword of Conan #66 (credited as "Danette Couto"), #190–195, 207–210, 225 (1981–1994)
- Spider-Woman #1–3 (1993–1994)
- Thor Annual #15 (1990)

=== Star*Reach ===
- Within Our Reach #1 (1991)

=== Topps Comics ===
- Cadillacs and Dinosaurs #9 (1994)

== Screenwriting ==
- G.I. Joe: A Real American Hero (1985)
