= List of Justice Society of America members =

The Justice Society of America is a team of comic book superheroes published by DC Comics. The JSA members are listed here only once—in order of their first joining the team. Retconned members are listed only where they historically took part in the stories.

Note: In the wake of DC Comics' Flashpoint event, the history of the JSA was rebooted. Many of the characters were reintroduced with new histories while others were erased from existence. Their history was later restored (with minor changes) by the events of Doomsday Clock. Characters' last known status is listed below. An alternate version of the team appears in the New 52 series Earth-2.

== Golden Age members ==
Character	Real Name	Joined	Notes
The Atom	Al Pratt	All Star Comics #3	Founding member. Deceased.
Batman	Bruce Wayne	All Star Comics #3	Founding honorary member. The character's history with the Society was erased after Crisis on Infinite Earths.
Doctor Fate	Kent Nelson	All Star Comics #3	Founding member. Deceased.
The Flash	Jay Garrick	All Star Comics #3	Founding member.
Green Lantern	Alan Scott	All Star Comics #3	Founding member.
Hawkman	Carter Hall	All Star Comics #3	Founding member and chairman.
Hourman	Rex Tyler	All Star Comics #3	Founding member. Retired.
The Sandman	Wesley Dodds	All Star Comics #3	Founding member. Deceased.
The Spectre	Jim Corrigan	All Star Comics #3	Founding member.
Superman	Clark Kent/Kal-L	All Star Comics #3	Founding honorary member. Deceased.
Johnny Thunder and The Thunderbolt	John L. Thunder and Yz	All Star Comics #6	Left the team after All Star Comics #39.
Doctor Mid-Nite	Charles McNider	All Star Comics #8	Deceased.
Starman	Ted Knight	All Star Comics #8	Deceased.
Wonder Woman	Diana	All Star Comics #11	Society Secretary. The character's history with the Society was erased after Crisis on Infinite Earths.
Mister Terrific	Terry Sloane	All Star Comics #24	Deceased.
Wildcat	Ted Grant	All Star Comics #24	
Black Canary	Dinah Drake	All Star Comics #41	Deceased.

== Guests in Justice League of America / Silver Age additions ==
Character	Real Name	Joined	Notes
Robin	Dick Grayson	Justice League of America #55	Deceased.
Red Tornado	John Smith/Ulthoon	Justice League of America #65	

== Return to All-Star Comics/ Bronze Age additions ==
Character	Real Name	Joined	Notes
The Star-Spangled Kid	Sylvester Pemberton, Jr.	All-Star Comics #58	Deceased.
Power Girl	Karen Starr/Kara Zor-L	All-Star Comics #58	
The Huntress	Helena Wayne	All-Star Comics #72	Killed in Crisis on Infinite Earths #12. Reintroduced in the New 52.

== Post-Crisis on Infinite Earths additions ==
Character	Real Name	Joined	Notes
Miss America	Joan Dale	Young All-Stars Annual #1	Retconned into the Golden Age team.
Hawkgirl	Shiera Sanders-Hall	Justice Society of America (vol. 2) #1	Referred to as a member in Last Days of the Justice Society. Retconned into the JSA in a yet-untold story.
Wonder Woman	Hippolyta	Wonder Woman (vol. 2) #133	Retconned as a member of the Golden Age team in Wonder Woman (vol. 2) #133.

== JSA additions ==
Character	Real Name	Joined	Notes
Atom Smasher	Albert Rothstein	JSA #2	
Black Canary	Dinah Lance	JSA #2	Retcon recognition as an individual distinct from her mother Dinah Drake in Justice League of America #220.
Hourman	Matthew Tyler	JSA #2	
Sand / The Sandman	Sanderson Hawkins	JSA #2	
Starman	Jack Knight	JSA #2	Retired from super-hero career.
Doctor Fate	Hector Hall	JSA #4	Deceased.
Hawkgirl	Kendra Saunders	JSA #4	Later revealed to be original Hawkgirl's (Shiera Sanders-Hall) spirit housed in her body after she killed herself.
The Star-Spangled Kid / Stargirl	Courtney Whitmore	JSA #4	
Mister Terrific	Michael Holt	JSA #11	
Doctor Mid-Nite	Pieter Cross	JSA #11	
Jakeem Thunder	Jakeem Williams	JSA Secret Files #2	
Black Adam	Teth-Adam/Theo Adam	JSA #21	Probationary member; defected in JSA #45.
Captain Marvel	Billy Batson	JSA #37	Active as the Captain.
Hourman	Rick Tyler	JSA #37	

== Justice Society of America (vol. 3) additions ==
Character	Real Name	Joined	Notes
Obsidian	Todd Rice	Between JSA #87 and Justice Society of America (vol. 3) #1	
Liberty Belle / Jesse Quick	Jesse Chambers	Between JSA #87 and Justice Society of America (vol. 3) #1	Leaves JSA to join the Justice League as its speedster from Justice League of America (vol. 2) #48 to #60.
Damage	Grant Emerson	Justice Society of America (vol. 3) #1	Died in Blackest Night #4. Resurrected after the events of Doomsday Clock.
Starman	Thom Kallor	Justice Society of America (vol. 3) #1	
Cyclone	Maxine Hunkel	Justice Society of America (vol. 3) #1	
Wildcat / Tomcat	Tom Bronson	Justice Society of America (vol. 3) #4	
Citizen Steel	Nate Heywood	Justice Society of America (vol. 3) #7	
Superman (Earth-22 version)	Clark Kent/Kal-El	Justice Society of America (vol. 3) #10	Returned to Earth-22.
Judomaster	Sonia Sato	Justice Society of America (vol. 3) #11	
Amazing Man	Markus Clay	Justice Society of America (vol. 3) #12	Left the JSA to return to New Orleans and considered forming a team of his own.
Lightning	Jennifer Pierce	Justice Society of America (vol. 3) #12	
Lance / Magog	David Reid	Justice Society of America (vol. 3) #12	Kicked out of the JSA All-Stars in Justice Society of America Annual #2
Mister America	Jeffrey Graves	Justice Society of America (vol. 3) #13	
All-American Kid	Billy Armstrong / Jeremy Karne	Justice Society of America (vol. 3) #29	Joined under false pretenses. Revealed to be Kid Karnevil in Justice Society of America (vol. 3) #33.
King Chimera		Justice Society of America (vol. 3) #29	
Doctor Fate	Kent V. Nelson	Justice Society of America (vol. 3) #30	
Blue Devil	Daniel Cassidy	Justice Society of America (vol. 3) #49	
Manhunter	Kate Spencer	Justice Society of America (vol. 3) #49	
Red Beetle	Sara Butters	Justice Society of America (vol. 3) #49	
Ri		Justice Society of America (vol. 3) #49	
Darknight		Justice Society of America (vol. 3) #49	

== JSA All-Stars (vol. 2) additions ==
Character	Real Name	Joined	Notes
Roxy		JSA All-Stars (vol. 2) #2	
Anna Fortune		JSA All-Stars (vol. 2) #6	

== DC Rebirth – present ==
Character	Real Name	Joined	Notes
Doctor Fate	Khalid Nassour	Prior to Dark Crisis #3	Grandnephew of Kent Nelson.
Doctor Mid-Nite	Beth Chapel	Prior to Doomsday Clock #12	
Hawkwoman	Shayera Thal	Prior to Dark Crisis #3	
Huntress	Helena Wayne	Justice Society of America (vol. 4) #5	Daughter of Batman and Catwoman. This version of the character is from the future of Prime Earth, rather than from Earth-2.
Jade	Jennifer-Lynn Haden	Prior to Doomsday Clock #12	Daughter of Green Lantern.
S.T.R.I.P.E.	Pat Dugan	Prior to Doomsday Clock #12	Formerly Stripsey.
Wildcat	Yolanda Montez	Prior to Doomsday Clock #12	
Wonder Woman	Diana of Themyscira/Diana Prince		Diana's career was shown in flashback to have started in the 1940s in the Rebirth timeline. When she joined the JSA is unknown.

== Young Justice Society ==
Character	Real Name	Notes
Air Wave	Harold "Hal" Jordan	Son of the original Air Wave.
Betsy Ross	Elizabeth Rose	Former sidekick of Miss America.
Big Words	Anthony Rodriguez	Member of the Newsboy Legion.
Boom	Judy Garrick	Daughter of the Flash.
Cherry Bomb	Gloria James	Former sidekick of the Human Bomb.
Dan the Dyna-Mite	Daniel Dunbar	Former sidekick of TNT.
Famous Bobby	Roberta Harper	Member of the Newsboy Legion.
Flip	Walter Johnson	Member of the Newsboy Legion.
Gabby	Jonathan Gabrielli	Member of the Newsboy Legion.
John Henry Jr.	John Henry Irons I	
Ladybug	Rosibel Rivera	Former sidekick of Red Bee.
Little Boy Blue	Tommy Rogers	Leader of the Blue Boys.
Little Miss Redhead	Janie	Member of the Blue Boys.
Molly Pitcher	Molly Preacher	Former sidekick of Miss America.
Pinky the Whiz Kid	Phineas "Pinky" Butler	Former sidekick of Mr. Scarlet.
Quiz Kid	Raghu Seetharaman	Former sidekick of Mister Terrific.
Robbie the Robot Dog		Former sidekick of Robotman
Salem the Witch Girl	Salem Nader	Former sidekick of Doctor Fate.
Scrapper	Patrick MacGuire	Member of the Newsboy Legion.
Secret	Greta Hayes	Former sidekick of the Spectre.
Sparky	Sparkington J. Northrup	Former sidekick of Blue Beetle.
Tick-Tock	James "Jimmy" Martin	Former sidekick of Hourman.
Tommy Thompkins		Member of the Newsboy Legion.
Toughy	Herbert Simms	Member of the Blue Boys.
Tubby	Richard Mehlville	Member of the Blue Boys.
Wing	Wing How	Former sidekick of the Crimson Avenger. Killed in Stargirl: The Lost Children #6.

== Alternate versions ==
=== Earth 2 ===
Two alternate versions of the JSA appears in the New 52 comics series Earth 2, set on another world of the Multiverse.

==== The World Army ====
Character	Real Name	Joined	Notes
Doctor Fate	Khalid Ben-Hassin	Earth 2 #10	
Captain Steel	Henry "Hank" Heywood Jr.	Earth 2 #13	
Red Arrow	Connor Hawke	Earth 2 #16	Killed by Parademons in Earth 2 #24.
Batman	Thomas Wayne	Earth 2 #17	Killed by an explosion in Convergence #3.
Red Tornado	Lois Lane	Earth 2 #18	
Aquawoman	Marella	Earth 2 #18	
Accountable	James "Jimmy" Olsen	Earth 2 #18	
Superman	Val-Zod	Earth 2 #19	

==== The Wonders of the World ====
Character	Real Name	Joined	Notes
Batman	Bruce Wayne	Prior to Earth 2 #1	Killed in Earth 2 #1.
Batman / Huntress / Robin	Helena Wayne	Prior to Earth 2 #1	
Power Girl / Supergirl	Kara Zor-El	Prior to Earth 2 #1	
Superman	Kal-El / Clark Kent	Prior to Earth 2 #1	Seemingly killed in Earth 2 #1, but revealed to be alive in Earth 2: World's End #9. Killed in Earth 2: World's End #15.
Wonder Woman	Diana of Amazon Island	Prior to Earth 2 #1	Killed in Earth 2 #1.
Catwoman	Selina Kyle	Prior to Earth 2 #0	Killed in Worlds' Finest #0.
Doctor Fate	Khalid Ben-Hassin	Earth 2 #14	
The Flash	Jay Garrick	Earth 2 #14	
Green Lantern	Alan Scott	Earth 2 #14	
Hawkgirl	Kendra Munoz-Saunders	Earth 2 #15	
The Atom	Al Pratt	Earth 2 #16	Killed in Earth 2: World's End #13.
Red Arrow	Connor Hawke	Earth 2 #16	Killed in Earth 2 #24.
Sandman	Wesley Dodds	Earth 2 #16	
Batman	Thomas Wayne	Earth 2: World's End #1	Killed by an explosion in Convergence #3.
Red Tornado	Lois Lane	Earth 2: World's End #1	
Superman	Val-Zod	Earth 2: World's End #1	
Batman	Dick Grayson	Earth 2: Society #16	Seemingly killed in Earth 2: Society #21.
Red Arrow	Oliver Queen	Earth 2: Society #16	Killed in Earth 2: Society #16.

=== The New Golden Age ===
An alternate version of the JSA appears in The New Golden Age storyline, in Helena Wayne's future.

Character	Real Name	Joined	Notes
Doctor Fate	Khalid Nassour	The New Golden Age #1	
The Flash	Judy Garrick	The New Golden Age #1	
Gentleman Ghost	Jim Craddock	Justice Society of America (vol. 4) #1	
Green Lantern	Alan Scott	The New Golden Age #1	
Harlequin's Son	Michael Mayne	Justice Society of America (vol. 4) #1	
The Huntress	Helena Wayne	Justice Society of America (vol. 4) #1	
Icicle	Cameron Mahkent	Justice Society of America (vol. 4) #1	
Mist	Kyle Knight	Justice Society of America (vol. 4) #1	
Power Girl	Kara Zor-L / Karen Starr	The New Golden Age #1	
Red Lantern	Ruby Sokov	Justice Society of America (vol. 4) #1	
Solomon Grundy	Cyrus Gold	Justice Society of America (vol. 4) #1	

== In other media ==
=== DC Animated Universe ===
Character	Real Name	First Appearance	Notes	Portrayed by
Justice Society
Flash	Jay Garrick	Superman & Batman Magazine #8	Comics-only	
Hawkman	Carter Hall	DC Animated Universe (comics)	Comics-only	
Hourman	Rex Tyler	Justice League Adventures #20	Comics-only	
Green Lantern	Alan Scott	Adventures in the DC Universe #4	Comics-only	
Sandman	Wesley Dodds	Justice League Adventures #20	Comics-only	
Starman	Ted Knight	Justice League Adventures #20	Comics-only	
Justice Guild of America
Black Siren	Donna Nance	Justice League S01E18	Based on Black Canary	Jennifer Hale
Catman	T. Blake	Justice League S01E18	Based on Wildcat and Batman	Stephen Root
Green Guardsman	Scott Mason	Justice League S01E18	Based on Green Lantern	William Katt
Ray Thompson		Justice League S01E18	Formerly team mascot	Neil Patrick Harris
Streak	Unknown	Justice League S01E18	Based on Flash	David Naughton
Tom Turbine	Unknown	Justice League S01E18	Based on Superman and Atom	Ted McGinley

=== Smallville ===
Character	Real Name	First Appearance	Notes	Portrayed by
Atom	Al Pratt	Smallville S09E11		Glenn Hoffmann
Black Canary	Dinah Drake	Smallville S09E11		
Doctor Fate	Kent Nelson	Smallville S09E11	Deceased	Brent Stait
Doctor Mid-Nite	Charles McNider	Smallville S09E11		
Flash	Jay Garrick	Smallville S09E11		Billy Mitchell
Green Lantern	Alan Scott	Smallville S09E11		Doug Pinton
Hawkgirl	Shiera Sanders Hall	Smallville S10E02	Deceased	Sahar Biniaz
Hawkman	Carter Hall	Smallville S09E11	Deceased	Michael Shanks
Hourman	Rex Tyler	Smallville S09E11		
Mister Terrific	Terry Sloane	Smallville S09E11		
Sandman	Wesley Dodds	Smallville S09E11	Deceased	Ken Lawson
Spectre	Jim Corrigan	Smallville S09E11		
Star-Spangled Kid	Sylvester Pemberton	Smallville S09E11	Deceased	Jim Shield
Wildcat	Ted Grant	Smallville S09E11		Roger Haskett

=== The Brave and the Bold ===
Character	Real Name	First Appearance	Notes	Portrayed by
Black Canary	Dinah Drake Lance	BTBATB S02E05	Deceased	Grey DeLisle
Doctor Fate	Kent Nelson	BTBATB S01E10		Greg Ellis
Doctor Mid-Nite	Charles McNider	BTBATB S02E05		Corey Burton
Flash	Jay Garrick	BTBATB S01E15		Andy Milder
Green Lantern	Alan Scott	BTBATB S03E11		Corey Burton
Hawkman	Carter Hall	BTBATB S02E05		William Katt
Hourman	Rex Tyler	BTBATB S02E05		Lex Lang
Mister Terrific	Terry Sloane	BTBATB S03E11		
Sandman	Wesley Dodds	BTBATB S03E11		
Spectre	Jim Corrigan	BTBATB S02E11		Mark Hamill
Starman	Ted Knight	BTBATB S03E11		Jeff Bennett
Wildcat	Ted Grant	BTBATB S01E06		R. Lee Ermey

=== DC Universe Animated Original Movies ===
Character	Real Name	First Appearance	Notes	Portrayed by
The New Frontier
Black Canary	Dinah Drake Lance	Justice League: The New Frontier (2008)		
Doctor Fate	Kent Nelson	Justice League: The New Frontier (2008)		
Doctor Mid-Nite	Charles McNider	Justice League: The New Frontier (2008)		
Flash	Jay Garrick	Justice League: The New Frontier (2008)		
Green Lantern	Alan Scott	Justice League: The New Frontier (2008)		
Hawkman	Carter Hall	Justice League: The New Frontier (2008)		
Spectre	Jim Corrigan	Justice League: The New Frontier (2008)		
Wildcat	Ted Grant	Justice League: The New Frontier (2008)		

=== Young Justice ===
Character	Real Name	First Appearance	Notes	Portrayed by
Doctor Fate	Kent Nelson	Young Justice S01E07	Deceased	Ed Asner
Flash	Jay Garrick	Young Justice S01E08		Geoff Pierson
Green Lantern	Alan Scott	Young Justice S01E15		
Red Tornado	John Smith	Young Justice S01E01		Jeff Bennett
Sandman	Wesley Dodds	Young Justice S01E15		
Wildcat	Ted Grant	Young Justice S01E15		

=== Arrowverse ===
==== Pre-Crisis members ====
A television adaptation of the JSA appears in the TV shows set in the Arrowverse. Members first appeared in Legends of Tomorrow. This version of the team was present in the Pre-Crisis continuity of Arrowverse Earth-1. It is currently unknown if they continue to exist on Earth-1 in the Post-Crisis continuity.

Character	Real Name	First Appearance	Notes	Portrayed by
Hourman	Rex Tyler	Legends of Tomorrow S01E16	Deceased	Patrick J. Adams
Commander Steel	Henry Heywood	Legends of Tomorrow S02E01		Matthew MacCaull
Obsidian	Todd Rice	Legends of Tomorrow S02E01	Retired as of 1987.	Lance Henriksen (older); Dan Payne (younger)
Stargirl	Courtney Whitmore	Legends of Tomorrow S02E01		Sarah Grey
Doctor Mid-Nite	Charles McNider	Legends of Tomorrow S02E01	Deceased	Kwesi Ameyaw
Vixen	Amaya Jiwe	Legends of Tomorrow S02E01		Maisie Richardson-Sellers

==== Post-Crisis members ====
A second version of the team appears in the Post-Crisis continuity of Arrowverse Earth-2. In this continuity, most of the JSA were wiped out by the Injustice Society 10 years prior to the start of Stargirl. Starman, shortly before his death, passes the Cosmic Staff to Pat Dugan for safekeeping in hopes that one day he can find someone who can use the Cosmic Staff and restart the JSA.

10 years later, Pat's stepdaughter Courtney Whitmore discovers the Cosmic Staff in the basement of their new home in Blue Valley, Nebraska, and is able to activate it. Courtney later takes the name Stargirl. After stealing the costumes and equipment of the former Justice Society, she gives the costumes and equipment to, and recruits her fellow High School students Yolanda Montez, Beth Chapel, and Rick Tyler to join her and Pat in the formation of a new Justice Society.

Character	Real Name	First Appearance	Notes	Portrayed by
First Team
Starman	Sylvester Pemberton	Stargirl S01E01		Joel McHale
Hourman	Rex Tyler	Stargirl S01E01	Deceased	Lou Ferrigno Jr.
Wildcat	Ted Grant	Stargirl S01E01	Deceased	Brian Stapf
Doctor Mid-Nite	Charles McNider	Stargirl S01E01		Henry Thomas (Season 1), Alex Collins (Season 2)
Flash	Jay Garrick	Stargirl S02E09		John Wesley Shipp
Johnny Thunder	John Thunder	Stargirl S02E03	Deceased	Ethan Embry
Thunderbolt	Yz	Stargirl S02E03		Jim Gaffigan (voice, S02); Seth Green (voice, S03)
Green Lantern	Alan Scott	Stargirl S01E01 (photograph only)	Deceased	
Doctor Fate	Kent Nelson	Stargirl S01E01 (photograph only)	Deceased	
Hawkman	Carter Hall	Stargirl S01E01 (photograph only)	Deceased	
Hawkgirl	Shiera Hall	Stargirl S01E01 (photograph only)	Deceased	
The Sandman	Wesley Dodds	Stargirl S01E01 (photograph only)	Deceased	
Spectre	Jim Corrigan			
Second Team
Stargirl	Courtney Whitmore	Stargirl S01E01		Brec Bassinger
Wildcat	Yolanda Montez	Stargirl S01E01		Yvette Monreal
Doctor Mid-Nite	Beth Chapel	Stargirl S01E01		Anjelika Washington
Hourman	Rick Tyler	Stargirl S01E01		Cameron Gellman
S.T.R.I.P.E.	Pat Dugan	Stargirl S01E01		Luke Wilson
S.T.R.I.P.E.	Mike Dugan	Stargirl S01E01		Trae Romano
Jade	Jennie-Lynn Hayden	Stargirl S02E01		Ysa Penarejo
Jakeem Thunder	Jakeem Williams	Stargirl S02E03		Alkoya Brunson

=== Injustice ===
Character	Real Name	First Appearance	Notes	Portrayed by
Amazing-Man	William Everett	Injustice: Year Zero #1		
Black Canary	Dinah Drake	Injustice: Year Zero #1		
Doctor Fate	Inza Cramer	Injustice 2 (2017)	Deceased	
Doctor Fate	Kent Nelson	Injustice: Gods Among Us: Year Two #2	Deceased	David Sobolov
Doctor Mid-Nite	Charles McNider	Injustice 2 #20		
Flash	Jay Garrick	Injustice: Gods Among Us (2013)	Deceased	Travis Willingham
Green Lantern	Alan Scott	Injustice: Year Zero #1		
Hawkgirl	Shiera Hall	Injustice: Gods Among Us (2013)		Jennifer Hale
Hawkman	Katar Hol	Injustice: Gods Among Us: Year Five #4	Deceased	
Hourman	Rick Tyler	Injustice: Year Zero #1		
Johnny Thunder	John Thunder	Injustice: Year Zero #1	Deceased	
Liberty Belle	Elizabeth Lawrence	Injustice: Year Zero #1		
Mister Terrific	Terry Sloane	Injustice: Year Zero #1		Edwin Hodge
Sandman	Wesley Dodds	Injustice: Year Zero #1	Deceased	
Spectre	Jim Corrigan	Injustice: Year Zero #1		
Starman	Ted Knight	Injustice: Year Zero #1		
Wildcat	Ted Grant	Injustice 2 #7		
Wonder Woman	Diana	Injustice: Gods Among Us (2013)		Susan Eisenberg; Janet Varney
Thunderbolt	Yz	Injustice: Year Zero #4		

=== DC Extended Universe ===
Character	Real Name	First Appearance	Notes	Portrayed by
Atom Smasher	Albert "Al" Rothstein	Black Adam (October 2022)		Noah Centineo
Cyclone	Maxine Hunkel	Black Adam (October 2022)		Quintessa Swindell
Doctor Fate	Kent Nelson	Black Adam (October 2022)	Deceased	Pierce Brosnan
Hawkman	Carter Hall	Black Adam (October 2022)	Team leader	Aldis Hodge

=== Tomorrowverse ===
Character	Real Name	First Appearance	Notes	Portrayed by
Black Canary	Dinah Lance	Justice Society: World War II (2021)		Elysia Rotaru
Flash	Jay Garrick	Justice Society: World War II (2021)		Armen Taylor
Hawkman	Carter Hall	Justice Society: World War II (2021)	Deceased	Omid Abtahi
Hourman	Rex Tyler	Justice Society: World War II (2021)		Matthew Mercer
Wonder Woman	Diana	Justice Society: World War II (2021)	Team leader	Stana Katic

== See also ==
- List of Justice League members
