= Ultra-Humanite =

DC Comics supervillain

- The Ultra-Humanite as depicted in Justice League of America #196 (November 1981). Art by George Pérez.

Publication information
- Publisher: DC Comics
- First appearance: Action Comics #13 (June 1939)
- Created by: Jerry Siegel; Joe Shuster

In-story information
- Alter ego: Gerard Shugel
- Species: Metahuman
- Team affiliations: Secret Society of Super Villains; Time Stealers
- Notable aliases: Dolores Winters; Johnny Thunder
- Abilities: Superhuman strength, durability, and intelligence; Primate control; Hypnotism; Telepathy; Telekinesis

The Ultra-Humanite is a supervillain appearing in American comic books published by DC Comics. He first appeared as a recurring adversary of Superman, and was the first supervillain faced by him. Though his name is a near-synonym for Superman, he was designed to be the polar opposite of Superman; while Superman is a hero with superhuman strength, the Ultra-Humanite is a criminal mastermind who has a crippled body but a highly advanced intellect. The Ultra-Humanite served as Superman's nemesis until the introduction of Superman's archnemesis, the mad scientist Lex Luthor. The origins of the Ultra-Humanite are shrouded in mystery. Even he claims not to remember his true name or appearance and attributes his vast intellect and mental prowess to scientific experiments of an unknown nature.

In other media, the Ultra-Humanite has appeared in Justice League, voiced by Ian Buchanan, as well as the third and final season of The CW network television series Stargirl.

== Publication history ==
The Ultra-Humanite was created by Jerry Siegel and Joe Shuster. He first appeared in Action Comics #13 (June 1939), which was written by Siegel and drawn by Paul Cassidy (serving as a ghost artist for Shuster).

== Fictional character history ==
=== Golden Age ===
Ultra-Humanite's original body, art by Joe Shuster.

The Ultra-Humanite is described by Superman as a "mad scientist who seeks domination of the Earth", is paralyzed from the waist down, and uses a wheelchair. Possessing a heightened intelligence, he prefers to use his talents for crime.

Superman sets out to take down the Cab Protective League, an organization headed by racketeer Jackie Reynolds. Reynolds' union intimidates other cab drivers through violence and threats against passengers. Apprehended by police, who overheard him mention his crimes during an argument with Superman, Reynolds is sentenced to Sing Sing penitentiary, but escapes by using a cigarette to emit a poisonous gas that kills his guards. Superman finds Reynolds in a cabin hideout, only to learn that Reynolds is working for the Ultra-Humanite. Superman is knocked out by an electric trap and taken captive. Reynolds and the Ultra-Humanite attempt to kill him with a buzz saw, but Superman's tough skin breaks the saw into fragments, which hit and kill Reynolds. Ultra-Humanite's henchmen set fire to the cabin, escape with their boss, and leave Superman to die. Superman regains consciousness and leaps into the aircraft's propeller, deliberately crashing the plane. He is unable to find the Ultra-Humanite, who escapes.

Ultra-Humanite is killed in battle with Superman after taking a blast from his own electrical gun. His assistants revive him with adrenaline. However, his body is still dying, so Ultra has his henchmen kidnap actress Dolores Winters and transplant his brain into her body. When "Dolores" threatens to disfigure her captives using a torch, Superman recognizes her as Ultra-Humanite. After Superman extinguishes the torch, Ultra-Humanite escapes.

The Ultra-Humanite made his last Superman appearance in Action Comics #21 (1940), and made no further comic book appearances for several decades. He was replaced as Superman's arch-enemy by Lex Luthor, who was introduced in Action Comics #23 (1940).

=== Silver Age and the Multiverse ===
With the introduction of DC's multiverse system, the continuity of Golden Age Superman stories and the Ultra-Humanite were retroactively placed on Earth-Two, the Earth of DC's Golden Age characters. The Ultra-Humanite was reintroduced during the Silver Age as a recurring villain in the "Mr. and Mrs. Superman" feature in the Superman Family anthology comic. The feature consists of stories about the early years of the marriage between the Earth-Two Superman and Lois Lane. These stories feature a number of Golden Age Superman villains of which the Ultra-Humanite is the most prominent.

In a JLA/JSA teamup story in Justice League of America #195-197 (1981), the Ultra-Humanite transfers his consciousness to an albino gorilla body. Later on, he recruits Brain Wave, Monocle, Rag Doll, Psycho-Pirate, Mist, Plant Master, Signalman, Cheetah, and Killer Frost into the Secret Society of Super Villains.

=== Post-Crisis ===
After the 1985-86 limited series Crisis on Infinite Earths, Superman's history was rewritten in The Man of Steel miniseries, and the Earth-Two Superman was removed from continuity. The Ultra-Humanite was excluded from Superman's reboot; previous appearances of the Ultra-Humanite fighting Golden Age Superman were retold to show him having fought other 1940s heroes.

The Ultra-Humanite's most ambitious scheme occurs in the 2002 "Stealing Thunder" story arc from JSA #32-37 where, having taken over the body of an aged Johnny Thunder, he deceives Jakeem Thunder into handing over his magical pen. With Thunderbolt's power, the Ultra-Humanite restores his body's youth, and then proceeds to take over the world. Under his rule, Earth is transformed into essentially a single mind, with nearly every metahuman becoming an extension of him. A few heroes manage to escape the control of the Ultra-Humanite. After the reserve JSA are able to temporarily short out Thunderbolt, the Ultra-Humanite is seemingly killed by the Crimson Avenger.

=== One Year Later ===
After the events of "Infinite Crisis", history was altered to bring Dolores Winters back to life via the reveal that her brain was placed in a new body after the Ultra-Humanite stole her body for his own use.

The Ultra-Humanite's secret origin is revised, shedding more light on his past life as genius youth Gerard Shugel (a name derived from Superman creators Joe Shuster and Jerry Siegel). He was born with both an intellect that surpassed the world's greatest minds and a degenerative disease that was slowly eating away his body. He used his intellect to find ways to keep the disease at bay, while trying to find a way to transplant his brain into a healthy body.

Working with a reckless and young Satanna, a fellow college researcher, they worked together at their brain/transplant and animal hybridization technologies. Backlash from animal rights activists forced them to relocate in the Democratic Republic of the Congo, where they were beset by rebel forces and the military. Satanna transplanted Shugel's brain into the altered body of an albino gorilla. They shared an intimate relationship for a while, then parted ways for a long time, paving the way for their separate adventures as chronicled pre-OYL.

In the 2006-07 Lightning Saga crossover between Justice Society of America and Justice League of America, the untold story of how the Ultra-Humanite transitioned from Dolores Winters' body to his albino ape form was revealed: Per Degaton, the villainous time traveler, and a young version of Despero rescued the Ultra-Humanite from a hospital in the year 1948. It is revealed that the Ultra-Humanite was stricken with terminal cancer and in exchange for his loyalty, Degaton agreed to provide a new body for the villain, in the form of an albino ape. Christening themselves the "Time Stealers", they align themselves with Mister Mind, Rex Hunter, Black Beetle, and the villainous father of Booster Gold in an attempt to manipulate time for their own goals. Their conspiracy ultimately unravels at the hands of Booster Gold and Blue Beetle.

Satanna returns to New York, attempting to aid her former lover, stealing the body of the current Terra, Atlee, for Gerard's use. After a lengthy fight, Power Girl retrieves Terra's brain (now in the crippled simian form of the Ultra-Humanite) and bring both of them to Strata, Atlee's advanced underground birth society, to restore Terra to her own body. Strata's scientists agree to clone a new, fully human body for Gerard Shugel, curing his disease. Power Girl attempts to hire him as a scientist for her Starr Labs, and Shugel plays along by showing a fake desire of reformation.

=== 2010s onward ===
When DC rebooted its continuity with The New 52 in 2011, the Ultra-Humanite was reintroduced in the pages of Action Comics with a wildly different concept: a fear-feeding alien in the Phantom Zone who manages to get out and feed on the fear of Superman when he is a child. Young Clark is too strong for him, so he retreats to the Phantom Zone.

Later, DC discarded most of its New 52 changes, with an initiative called DC Rebirth. All of Superman's villains and history were restored to pre-New 52 basics in a storyline called Superman Reborn. The original Ultra-Humanite subsequently appeared again, depicted as an evil genius who placed his brain into an albino gorilla. He is a member of the Secret Society of Super Villains.

In Superman and the Authority, the Ultra-Humanite's canonical status as Superman's first villain returns as Brainiac supplies him with a method of Brain cloning that allows him to be in multiple places at once. Superman is forced to leave Earth with the Authority while the Ultra-Humanite, unconcerned with implications of Clark's journey, prepares to continue his villainous career as the arch-nemesis of Jon Kent.

== Powers and abilities ==
The Ultra-Humanite possesses a super-genius intelligence, thus making him twice as smart as Lex Luthor. He has the medical knowledge necessary to surgically transfer his brain into another body without transplant rejection, even when using variously different species. His most frequently revisited form is that of a mutated albino gorilla with immense physical attributes and psychic powers. He invented numerous advanced weapons, vehicles, and other arcane technology.

In the New 52, the Ultra-Humanite is portrayed as an alien who feeds on a person's emotions. To help him do this, he can send out small tentacled creatures that overshadows his victim, as well as draining the fears out of him or her.

== Other versions ==
=== Tangent: Superman's Reign ===
An alternate universe version of Ultra-Humanite appears in Tangent: Superman's Reign series. This version is a living weapon created by the Soviets that went out of control.

=== Legends of the DC Universe ===
The first three issues of Legends of the DC Universe feature the post-Crisis Superman. Superman is early in his career and battles a scientist named Morgan Wilde who, angered by the death of his wife, swears revenge on Luthor and gains the ability to transfer his "life essence" (called "Under-Light") as the U.L.T.R.A. Humanite.

=== The Golden Age ===
An alternate universe version of Ultra-Humanite appears in The Golden Age, where he utilizes the body of Tex Thomson.

=== Superman & Batman: Generations ===
An alternate universe version of Ultra-Humanite appears in Superman & Batman: Generations, where he utilizes the body of Lex Luthor. Ultra-Humanite attempts to swap bodies with Superman, but is killed when Superman electrocutes him.

=== Earth 2 ===
An alternate universe version of Ultra-Humanite appears in Earth 2: Society. This version is a survivor of the destroyed Earth 2 and uses the lost children of the old Earth as his personal soldiers. Ultra-Humanite is killed by Hawkgirl with the Amazonion Casket, the object he was going to use as part of his plan to take over Earth 2.

== In other media ==
=== Television ===
The Ultra-Humanite (left) as he appears in Justice League.

- Ultra-Humanite in his albino gorilla body appears in Justice League, voiced by Ian Buchanan. This version is a cultured and intellectual criminal with a deep love for classical music and violent hatred for most modern art. Additionally, he is more benevolent than his comics counterpart, helping heroes for his own reasons across his appearances, with one seeing him joining Lex Luthor's Injustice Gang before eventually betraying him.
- Ultra-Humanite appears in the Batman: The Brave and the Bold episode "Four Star Spectacular!", voiced by Jeff Bennett. This version is a brain in a small mobile robotic jar capable of possessing others.
- Ultra-Humanite in his albino gorilla body appears in Young Justice, with vocal effects provided by Dee Bradley Baker in the first season and by Greg Weisman in the third season. This version is a member of the Light and the Injustice League and a mentor to Helga Jace.
- Ultra-Humanite in his albino gorilla body appears in the third season of Stargirl, voiced by an uncredited actor. This version is an enemy of the Justice Society of America and an associate of Dragon King. In the present, Ultra-Humanite forms an alliance with Icicle and Dragon King before transplanting his brain into the body of Starman (portrayed by Joel McHale) to manipulate Stargirl and her JSA while Dragon King transplanted his brain into Ultra-Humanite's body for him to "defeat" as Starman alongside Icicle's son before intending to run for president as a mouthpiece for Icicle to spread his ideals. However, the JSA defeat the villains, with S.T.R.I.P.E. leaving Ultra-Humanite brain-damaged.

=== Video games ===
- Ultra-Humanite appears in DC Universe Online, voiced by Brian Jepson.
- Ultra-Humanite appears as a character summon in Scribblenauts Unmasked: A DC Comics Adventure.
- Ultra-Humanite appears as a playable character in Lego Batman 3: Beyond Gotham, voiced by Travis Willingham.
- Ultra-Humanite appears as a playable character in Lego DC Super-Villains.

=== Miscellaneous ===
- Ultra-Humanite in his albino gorilla body appears in Batman: The Brave and the Bold #3.
- Ultra-Humanite appears in Young Justice #19. It is revealed that this version was originally an old woman who had her brain transplanted into an albino gorilla.

=== Merchandise ===
- Ultra-Humanite received a figure in Mattel's Justice League Unlimited toyline.
- Ultra-Humanite served as the Collect and Connect figure for the fourteenth wave of the DC Universe Classics line.

== See also ==
- List of Superman enemies
