= Stars and S.T.R.I.P.E. =

Comic-book series published by DC Comics

- Cover of Stars and S.T.R.I.P.E. #0 (July 1999), art by Lee Moder.

Publication information
- Publisher: DC Comics
- Schedule: Monthly
- Format: Ongoing when in publication
- Publication date: July 1999 - December 2000
- No. of issues: 15 (0-14)
- Main character(s): Star-Spangled Kid; S.T.R.I.P.E.

Creative team
- Written by: Geoff Johns
- Penciller: Lee Moder
- Inker: Dan Davis

Collected editions
- JSA Presents:...: ISBN 1-4012-1390-1

Stars and S.T.R.I.P.E. is an American comic book published by DC Comics, featuring the second Star-Spangled Kid and her stepfather, the original version's sidekick Stripesy. It was first published in July 1999 (with a "zero issue") and ran for fifteen single issues. It was written by Geoff Johns, with art by Lee Moder and Dan Davis.

== Courtney Whitmore ==
Courtney is the stepdaughter of Pat Dugan and the main protagonist of the series. She found Sylvester Pemberton's cosmic converter belt in her stepfather's belongings and donned the costume in order to annoy him as partial revenge for marrying her mother and supposedly forcing the family to move from Los Angeles to Blue Valley, Nebraska. Dugan, a skilled mechanic, designed and built S.T.R.I.P.E., an armored robot which he rides in to accompany and protect her. Eventually, she joined the Justice Society of America and, after being given Starman's gravity rod by Jack Knight, changed her identity to Stargirl.

== S.T.R.I.P.E. ==
S.T.R.I.P.E. is a fictional superhero in the DC Comics universe. Real name Pat Dugan, he first went by the nickname Stripesy. He is notable for being the only adult sidekick to a teenage superhero—Sylvester Pemberton, the Star-Spangled Kid. Stripesy was a gifted mechanic who built the duo's car, the Star Rocket Racer. Together, they were members of the Seven Soldiers of Victory and the All-Star Squadron. Stripesy was created by Jerry Siegel (co-creator of Superman) and Hal Sherman, and first appeared in Action Comics #40 (September 1941).

The character has been updated for a new audience: Dugan's stepdaughter, Courtney Whitmore, has become the second Star-Spangled Kid, partly in order to annoy him. This has led Dugan to develop a robotic suit of armor so as to accompany and protect her. He has also changed his moniker to S.T.R.I.P.E.. Dugan has also assisted Superman's comrade Steel.
