= Star Spangled Comics =

American comic book anthology series

- Star Spangled Comics #1 (November 1941), art by Hal Sherman.

Publication information
- Publisher: DC Comics
- Schedule: Monthly
- Format: Ongoing series
- Publication date: October 1941 – July 1952
- No. of issues: 130
- Main character(s): Star-Spangled Kid and Stripesy; Newsboy Legion; Robin, the Boy Wonder; Tomahawk

Creative team
- Written by: List: Jack Kirby, Jerry Siegel, Joe Simon
- Artist: List: Edmond Good, Hal Sherman, Jack Kirby, Joe Simon
- Editor: List: Whitney Ellsworth (#1–15) Jack Schiff (#16–130)

Star Spangled Comics is a comics anthology published by DC Comics which ran for 130 issues from October 1941 to July 1952. It was then retitled Star Spangled War Stories and lasted until issue #204 (February–March 1977).

== Publication history ==
Star Spangled Comics debuted with an October 1941 cover date. The series began as a superhero title featuring the adventures of the Star-Spangled Kid and Stripesy who appeared until #86 (November 1948). This feature had the distinction of a teen hero with an older sidekick (the reverse of the usual arrangement). With issue #7 (April 1942), the title starred the Joe Simon and Jack Kirby-created Newsboy Legion. A series of stories featuring Robin, the Boy Wonder began in issue #65 (February 1947) and continued through the end of the title with issue #130, and primarily featured Robin solo adventures, but also included some occasional cameos by Batman. Comics historian Brian Cronin has noted that due to Robin's feature in Star Spangled Comics, he made more appearances during the Golden Age of Comics than Batman.

Tomahawk, a western feature, was introduced in #69 (June 1947). Merry, Girl of 1,000 Gimmicks, first appeared in #81 (June 1948) in the "Star-Spangled Kid" feature. In the early 1950s, the title became dominated by horror features and by the end of its run the book switched to a war format; at which point it was rebooted to become Star Spangled War Stories.

A Star Spangled Comics one-shot by writer Geoff Johns and artist Chris Weston was published in 1999 as part of the "Justice Society Returns" storyline.

== Collected editions ==
- The Newsboy Legion Vol. 1 collects Star Spangled Comics #7–32, 360 pages, March 2010, ISBN 978-1401225933
- The Newsboy Legion Vol. 2 collects Star Spangled Comics #33–64, 368 pages, August 2017, ISBN 978-1401272364
- Robin Archives Vol. 1 collects Robin stories from Star Spangled Comics #65–85, 240 pages, October 2005, ISBN 978-1401204150
- Robin Archives Vol. 2 collects Robin stories from Star Spangled Comics #86–105, 256 pages, April 2010, ISBN 978-1401226251
