= Thunderbolt (DC Comics) =

DC Comics fictional character

- Thunderbolt as depicted in JSA #21 (April 2001). Art by Alan Davis.

Publication information
- Publisher: DC Comics
- First appearance: Flash Comics #1 (January 1940)
- Created by: John B. Wentworth; Stan Aschmeier

In-story information
- Alter ego: Yz
- Species: Fifth Dimensional Genie
- Place of origin: Fifth Dimension
- Team affiliations: Justice Society of America; All-Star Squadron; Justice League
- Abilities: Magic; Flight; Reality Warping; Nigh-Omnipotence

The Thunderbolt (Yz) is a fictional character appearing in American comic books published by DC Comics and the name of other fictional genie variants within the 5th Dimension as well. Yz was originally portrayed as a genie-like character who hosts Johnny Thunder and then later Jakeem Thunder. He also appeared as an original and ordinary member of the Justice Society of America.

Jim Gaffigan and Seth Green each voiced the character in The CW television show Stargirl.

== Publication history ==
Thunderbolt (Yz) first appeared in Flash Comics #1, published with a cover date of January 1940, and was created by John Wentworth and Stan Aschmeier.

== Fictional character biography ==
Yz is a fifth-dimensional genie who resided in a pen that was entrusted to Johnny Thunder on his birthday where the Badhnesians would use it to rule the world. This plan was thwarted when Badhnesia was attacked by a neighboring country. Later on, Johnny Thunder became aware of Thunderbolt's existence and the summoning word "cei-u".

In the early 1950s, Johnny is kidnapped by the Badhnesians with the intention of executing their original world conquest plan. With help from Thunderbolt, Johnny manages to summon Superman and the would-be conquerors' plans are defeated.

Later, Johnny Thunder develops dementia and loses track of the pen in which the Thunderbolt is being stored. The pen eventually ends up in the ownership of Jakeem Thunder.

In a later battle with Solomon Grundy, Jakeem unwittingly cures Johnny Thunder of Alzheimer's thanks to Thunderbolt. However, Johnny immediately falls prey to the Ultra-Humanite, who takes over Johnny's body to command the Thunderbolt's powers. In the "Stealing Thunder" storyline, Jakeem is one of several heroes left free from Ultra-Humanite's control. Eventually Jakeem wrests control of the Thunderbolt back from Ultra-Humanite, but Johnny Thunder is killed. Jakeem then wishes that the Thunderbolt could save Johnny somehow, so the genie chooses to merge with Johnny, creating a new being with the memories of both. He later assumes the name Johnny Thunderbolt.

In the DC Rebirth reboot, it was mentioned that Johnny Thunder lost Thunderbolt after Joseph McCarthy had him reveal his secret.

In Doomsday Clock, Thunderbolt returned when Doctor Manhattan undid the experiment that erased the Justice Society of America and the Legion of Super-Heroes.

Jakeem later encounters the Teen Titans after Thunderbolt's brother Elias summons Johnny Thunderbolt and removes an artifact known as the Stone of Souls from its body, rendering Jakeem powerless. When the Titans nearly die while trying to save Djinn, Jakeem discovers that he possesses some of Johnny Thunderbolt's power, enabling him to save the young heroes. After Elias' defeat, Djinn restores Johnny Thunderbolt and leaves with Jakeem to explore her newfound freedom.

== Variants ==
=== Mzzttexxal ===
Mzzttexxal is a parasitic energy being from an unknown planet. She bonded with a private detective named Jonni Thunder.

=== Zzlrrrzzzm ===
Zzlrrrzzzm is a parasitic energy being from an unknown planet, and the lover of Mzzttexxal. He later became bonded to Skyman.

== In other media ==
- The Yz incarnation of Thunderbolt makes non-speaking appearances in Justice League Unlimited as a member of an expanded Justice League.
- The Yz incarnation of Thunderbolt appears in Stargirl, voiced by Jim Gaffigan in the second season and Seth Green in the third. This version requires strict rules to grant wishes, such as specific wording, and was previously a member of the Justice Society of America alongside Johnny Thunder until the latter was killed in an attack by the Injustice Society and Thunderbolt was left trapped in his pen for over 10 years after Johnny wished for him to return to it and wait for a new owner. In the episode "Summer School: Chapter Three", Pat Dugan's son Mike obtains the pen and befriends Thunderbolt. Following a confrontation with Shade, Mike unknowingly wishes for the pen to end up in better hands, causing it to be teleported to his friend Jakeem Williams. Thunderbolt and Jakeem later assist Stargirl's JSA and their allies in fighting Eclipso.
