= Liberty Belle (character) =

Fictional characters in comics

- Libby Lawrence as the Liberty Belle in All-Star Squadron #61 (September 1986 DC Comics) drawn by Michael Harris

Publication information
- Publisher: DC Comics
- First appearance: Boy Commandos #1 (winter 1942)
- Created by: Don Cameron; Chuck Winter

In-story information
- Alter ego: Libby Lawrence; Jesse Quick
- Species: Metahuman
- Team affiliations: All-Star Squadron
- Abilities: Enhanced speed, strength, stamina, and sonic vibrational pulses Exceptional hand to hand combatant

The Liberty Belle is the name of three superheroines. Two are from DC Comics: Libby Lawrence and Jesse Chambers, and the other is from Charlton Comics: Caroline Dean.

== DC Comics ==
=== Libby Lawrence ===
The first Liberty Belle was Libby Lawrence. Her powers of enhanced speed, strength, and stamina were linked to the ringing of the Liberty Bell in Philadelphia. Early in her mystery-woman career, she had an arrangement with Tom Revere, a guard at the Liberty Bell. When she signaled him, he would ring the bell for her and trigger her powers. In her later years, after decades of super-strength many began to theorize about the nature of her powers. Some believed the sonic vibrations of the bell triggered a metahuman gene, some believed that it was mystical because Libby is connected to the power of the Spirit of America, like the heroes Uncle Sam and General Glory. Most of the Liberty Belle's heroic exploits took place during the Second World War, and she was one of the founding members (and later chairwoman) of the All-Star Squadron. In her public identity, she was the famous radio columnist Libby Lawrence, and therefore well-known both in and out of costume. During the war, she married speedster Johnny Quick. After the war, they had a daughter, Jesse, who shared both their powers and took the codename Jesse Quick. Libby Lawrence is a descendant of Bess Lynn, alias Miss Liberty.

==== Publication history ====
This character appeared in several publications. The Liberty Belle debuted in Boy Commandos #1 (winter 1942/1943). After her second appearance in Boy Commandos #2 (Spring 1943), the character thereafter appeared in Star Spangled Comics #20 (May 1943) through to Star Spangled Comics #68 (May 1947).

In 1981, DC published issue #1 of All-Star Squadron, a book whose first story appeared as an insert in Justice League of America #193. The self-described "conceptualizer" of the book was its writer Roy Thomas. He chose to include the Liberty Belle in this World War II comic to, in his own words, "play down the Earth-Two heroes who have counterparts on Earth-One in favor of other, quite promising characters who have been ignored or underplayed". Thomas also said that the Liberty Belle was chosen to stand in for Wonder Woman. All-Star Squadron lasted 67 issues, with the last being published in 1987.

As he did with several other characters, Roy Thomas took some liberties with the Liberty Belle's Golden Age continuity by having her retroactively marry Johnny Quick in 1942, while all her Golden Age appearances throughout the 1940s depict her as a single woman with a semi-romantic relationship with Captain Rick Cannon of G2 Army Intelligence. Thomas also wrote a story depicting the death of Tom Revere in 1942, despite the fact that he was a supporting character from the Golden Age Liberty Belle stories, most of which take place in 1943 and later. Finally, Thomas had the Liberty Belle retroactively wear a mask from her first appearance, rather than her original unmasked look, in which she disguised herself only by allowing her loosed hair to partly drape over her face in a look inspired by Veronica Lake.

Young All-Stars #1 came out in 1987 as a replacement book for All-Star Squadron in the wake of the Crisis on Infinite Earths and the loss of Earth-Two as a fictional setting. The Liberty Belle was used as a supporting character in this book which came to an end in 1989 with issue #31.

In 1992 DC began publishing Justice Society of America with writer Len Strazewski. The Liberty Belle appeared in flashbacks and only in her public persona of Libby Lawrence. She was used to flesh out the characters of Johnny Chambers (her ex-husband) and Jesse Chambers (their daughter).

The Liberty Belle was ranked 63rd in Comics Buyer's Guide's "100 Sexiest Women in Comics" list.

==== Fictional character history ====
===== Early history =====
All-Star Squadron #61 (September 1986) is the first true Post-Crisis issue of that comic which chronicled the origin of the Liberty Belle.

Libby Lawrence wins the American Intercollegiate Girls Athletic Tournament and receives a bell-shaped medal made from a piece of the original Liberty Bell. Years later, she becomes a member of the American team at the 1936 Olympics in Berlin, where she wins gold medals for competitive swimming.

===== World War II =====
When the Second World War begins in 1939, the young Libby Lawrence is in Poland acting as personal secretary to her father, Major James Lawrence. Her father is killed in a Nazi air raid and with the help of Rick Cannon, Libby begins a journey across Nazi occupied Europe gathering important intelligence along the way. At Dunkirk, she swims the English Channel to bring the information to the Allies. Libby is received with a ticker-tape parade on New York's Fifth Avenue and is shortly thereafter given work at a daily news syndicate, and then as a radio reporter, and she even has a television program (suspended only after the events at Pearl Harbor).

In the autumn of 1941, Libby is living in her hometown of Philadelphia. She rescues Rick Cannon, whom she thought to be a spy himself, from Nazi saboteurs.

Now a mystery-woman, the Liberty Belle becomes involved in the founding of the All-Star Squadron. On December 8, 1941 she is present, with a handful of other mystery-men, in the White House when President Roosevelt announces his order that the Justice Society of America mobilize all American costumed heroes into a single unit, an All-Star Squadron, responsible directly to the President. Their first mission is to fly to the West Coast, search out any saboteurs and prevent a Japanese attack on the U.S. mainland. They find the JSA have been captured by the time travelling villain Per Degaton, who is planning to change the events in an attempt at world domination. They stopped this, though when Per Degaton went back to 1947, they forgot his involvement. Soon after, the core members of the All-Star Squadron, including Libby, begin the process of electing other mystery-men for membership. During the meeting, the matter of electing a permanent chairman is decided by secret ballot, and the Liberty Belle receives the majority vote.

Days later, Libby returns to Philadelphia to visit with her friend Tom Revere. Independence Hall is attacked by Baron Blitzkrieg, Zyklon and Major Zwerg. In the battle, Tom Revere is killed while Major Zwerg is badly injured, the two other Nazi agents escape with the Liberty Bell. After learning that Blitzkrieg wanted the Liberty Bell to restore his sight, Libby gets to her base in a church with the help of Hawkgirl. Lightning strikes the Bell, the Baron regains his sight and escapes and Libby gains the ability to manipulate sound waves.

On April 1, 1942, Libby marries Johnny Chambers in Boston.

Libby continues to lead the All-Star Squadron in DC's series published in the 1980s but set during World War II: All-Star Squadron and Young All-Stars.

===== Later history =====
At some point after the war, Libby retires as a mystery-woman. Later still, she and Johnny have a child whom they name Jesse and begin raising a family.

Libby finally breaks up with Johnny as he founds his company called Quick-Start; the divorce soon follows. It is during this painful divorce that daughter Jesse uses her father's speed formula for the first time.

Libby later becomes extremely bitter about the costumed-adventurer business.

Libby puts on her costume again during the Infinite Crisis. Libby is fighting against Baron Blitzkrieg and other members of the Society when her powers fail. She goes to Philadelphia and attempts to increase her power levels by repeatedly ringing the Liberty Bell; however, this does not work and the Liberty Belle is trapped on the Bell, which is producing damage via sonic waves. The JSA try to help her and in the end she is saved by Stargirl.

A short time after the events of the Brightest Day crossover, Libby returns to superheroics after being recruited by the Manhunter to help the JSA battle a villain named Scythe. Writer Marc Guggenheim explained that having Libby return to the Liberty Belle identity was suggested to him by James Robinson after Libby's daughter returned to the Jesse Quick identity and joined the Justice League.

In the pages of "Dark Nights: Death Metal", Libby is revealed to be entombed in the Valhalla Cemetery. Batman later revived her with a Black Lantern power ring.

=== Jesse Chambers ===
Jesse Chambers is the second woman in the DC Universe to assume the identity of the Liberty Belle. As discussed earlier, she is the daughter of the Liberty Belle and Johnny Quick, having inherited her mother's powers. She combines those powers of enhanced strength, agility, reflexes and stamina with her father's speed, which is invoked by reciting a mathematical formula. Realizing her powers, she joins the JSA in its third incarnation. Although originally known as the speedster Jesse Quick, in December 2006 she debuted as the second Liberty Belle. Jesse marries the second Hourman, Rick Tyler, and they work as a duo within the Justice Society, until the team splits into a smaller Justice Society and a new incarnation of the All-Stars. In 2010, she joins the Justice League of America.

== Charlton Comics ==
A backup feature in Charlton's E-Man #5 (November 1974), Caroline Dean, the second Liberty Belle, was a red-white-and-blue heroine who helps out on an American rocket launch. Joe Gill scripted, with industry legend Steve Ditko supplying the art.

== Other versions ==
=== Earth-51 ===
Libby Lawrence-Chambers is President of the United States on this Earth, and is referred to as the former Liberty Belle.

=== Amalgam Comics ===
In the Amalgam Comics universe, the American Belle is an amalgamation of DC's Liberty Belle and Marvel's Miss America. The American Belle is a member of the World War II era All-Star Winners Squadron (an amalgamation of DC's All-Star Squadron and Marvel's All-Winners Squad). She appears in Super-Soldier: Man of War #1 (June 1997).

== In other media ==
=== Film ===
- The Libby Lawrence version of the character makes a cameo appearance in Superman (2025), being included on a mural depicting the history of metahumans in the DCU in the Hall of Justice.
