= Jakeem Thunder =

- Jakeem Thunder and Johnny Thunderbolt in JSA #80 (February 2006). Art by Alex Ross.

Publication information
- Publisher: DC Comics
- First appearance: Cameo: The Flash (vol. 2) #134 (February 1998); Full appearance: JLA #26 (February 1999)
- Created by: Grant Morrison (writer); Mark Millar (writer); Paul Ryan (artist)

In-story information
- Alter ego: Jakeem Johnny Williams
- Species: Human
- Team affiliations: Justice Society of America; Justice League; Teen Titans
- Partnerships: Thunderbolt
- Notable aliases: J.J. Thunder
- Abilities: Genie summoning via pen

Jakeem Thunder (Jakeem Johnny Williams), initially called J.J. Thunder, is a fictional character in the DC Comics Universe, a member of the superhero team the Justice Society of America.

The character appeared starting in the second season of Stargirl on The CW network, portrayed by Alkoya Brunson.

== Publication history ==
Jakeem first appeared in The Flash (vol. 2) #134 (February 1998), and was created by Grant Morrison, Mark Millar and Paul Ryan.

== Fictional character biography ==
Jakeem Johnny Williams is a precocious teenager from Keystone City—home of Jay Garrick (the original Flash) and Wally West (one of Garrick's successors). Jakeem's mother left his father while she was still pregnant with the boy and later died of cancer. His aunt Lashawn was then granted custody and his father Phil, never knew about his birth. Jakeem became a self-reliant latchkey kid who grew up on the streets and adopted a tough, foul-mouthed attitude to survive.

When Johnny Thunder loses control over his "genie" Thunderbolt due to his declining mental health, he puts the genie inside an ink pen, which Jay gives to Jakeem. Soon thereafter, the world is threatened by Lkz, a blue genie similar to Thunderbolt but evil in nature. The Justice League of America and Justice Society of America unite to fight the being, whereupon Jakeem discovers that Thunderbolt originates from the Fifth Dimension and is controlled by speaking its name (Yz) backwards ("Say You"). Jakeem works with a small group of JSA members, as they attempted to stay alive while Yz and Lkz battle.

Qwsp is arrested by the Fifth Dimension police. With the assistance of Captain Marvel, Jakeem fuses Yz with Lkz into a new purple genie named Ylzkz, who is controlled by speaking the phrase So Cûl (pronounced "so cool").

=== Justice Society of America ===
Jakeem somewhat reluctantly joins the Justice Society as a part-time member. Jakeem is welcomed by the fellow young hero Courtney Whitmore (the Star-Spangled Kid, who later changes her codename to Stargirl), who becomes a friend, and positive influence on him. He also benefits from the guidance of Johnny Thunder himself. He and Hourman also build a brotherly friendship. Like Johnny before him, he often causes trouble by wishing for things without meaning to, due to poorly worded commands.

During the "Last Laugh" story arc where certain villains in the DC universe have been affected by the Joker's laughing gas, a Jokerized Solomon Grundy attacks the JSA headquarters. His initial attack involves dropping the head of the Statue of Liberty outside the doors of the JSA and knocking out the then-caretaker of the museum, Alexander Montez. Jakeem and Courtney are the only two at the headquarters at the time. Their fight against Grundy goes badly, as he steals Jakeem's pen and retreats to the sewers. Jakeem tells Courtney he wants to get the pen back not because he sees Thunderbolt as his power, but because Thunderbolt is his friend.

During the fight with Grundy, Jakeem is nearly knocked out by the behemoth. He realizes Courtney is in grave peril and in desperation, stretches to reach his pen, just out of reach. A purplish-pink wave of energy appears in his eyes and around the pen, which levitates into his grasp. Jakeem briefly wonders how this has happened, but decides to figure it out later. The fight serves as a bonding experience between the two young heroes. Jakeem has Thunderbolt fix the Statue of Liberty.

=== Johnny Thunderbolt ===
During the battle with Grundy, Jakeem unwittingly cures his predecessor Johnny Thunder of his Alzheimer's disease. Johnny immediately falls prey to Ultra-Humanite, who takes over Johnny's body in order to command Thunderbolt's powers. Jakeem wrests control of Thunderbolt back from Ultra-Humanite, but Johnny Thunder is killed. Jakeem then wishes that Thunderbolt could save Johnny somehow, so the genie chooses to merge with Johnny, creating a new being with the memories of both. He later assumes the name Johnny Thunderbolt. Johnny's family is informed of his death, not knowing that he lives on as Thunderbolt.

With Johnny's help, Jakeem meets his biological father Phil, who is now an engineering student. Jakeem does not reveal his true identity, but he also meets Phil's wife Jennifer and his younger half-brother. He is torn by his longing to reconnect with his biological father, but fears he will upset Phil's life.

=== Infinite Crisis ===
In the "Infinite Crisis" storyline, the Spectre shunts Jakeem through his pen into the Fifth Dimension, where he succumbs to the machinations of Qwsp and becomes a mad tyrant. The Thunderbolt amasses an army to fight him, including the Thunderbolt's son Shocko and Shocko's wife Peachy Pet. With the help of the JSA, Jakeem is freed of Qwsp's influence. Upon the JSA's return from the Fifth Dimension, they find the villain Mordru battling with Nabu. Jakeem stabs Mordru in the throat with his pen, then summons Thunderbolt, electrocuting Mordru. Jakeem asks Thunderbolt to send Mordru "somewhere none of us will ever have to see him again" (followed for the first time by a "please").

=== The New 52 ===
Following the events of Flashpoint, Jakeem and the Justice Society are not present in the rebooted The New 52 timeline, with the Justice League instead taking over as the world's first publicly-known superhero team. This is later revealed to be the result of Doctor Manhattan erasing them from history, with Superman eventually convincing him to restore the Society.

== Powers and abilities ==
Jakeem has the ability to summon and control a fifth-dimensional genie in the form of "Johnny Thunderbolt". The genie can fulfill any wish made by Jakeem, though he occasionally follows Jakeem's wishes too literally. Thunderbolt's abilities have become limited due to certain limitations according to the new rules of the Tenth Age of Magic.

== In other media ==
- Jakeem Thunder appears in Stargirl, portrayed by Alkoya Brunson. This version is a gamer, the brother of Cindy Burman's best friend Jenny Williams, with whom he has a poor relationship, and a friend of Courtney Whitmore's younger stepbrother and Pat Dugan's son, Mike. After Mike gives him Johnny Thunder's pen, Jakeem helps the Justice Society of America and their allies fight Eclipso.
- Jakeem Thunder appears as a character summon in Scribblenauts Unmasked: A DC Comics Adventure.
