= Geoff Johns =

American comic book writer (born 1973)

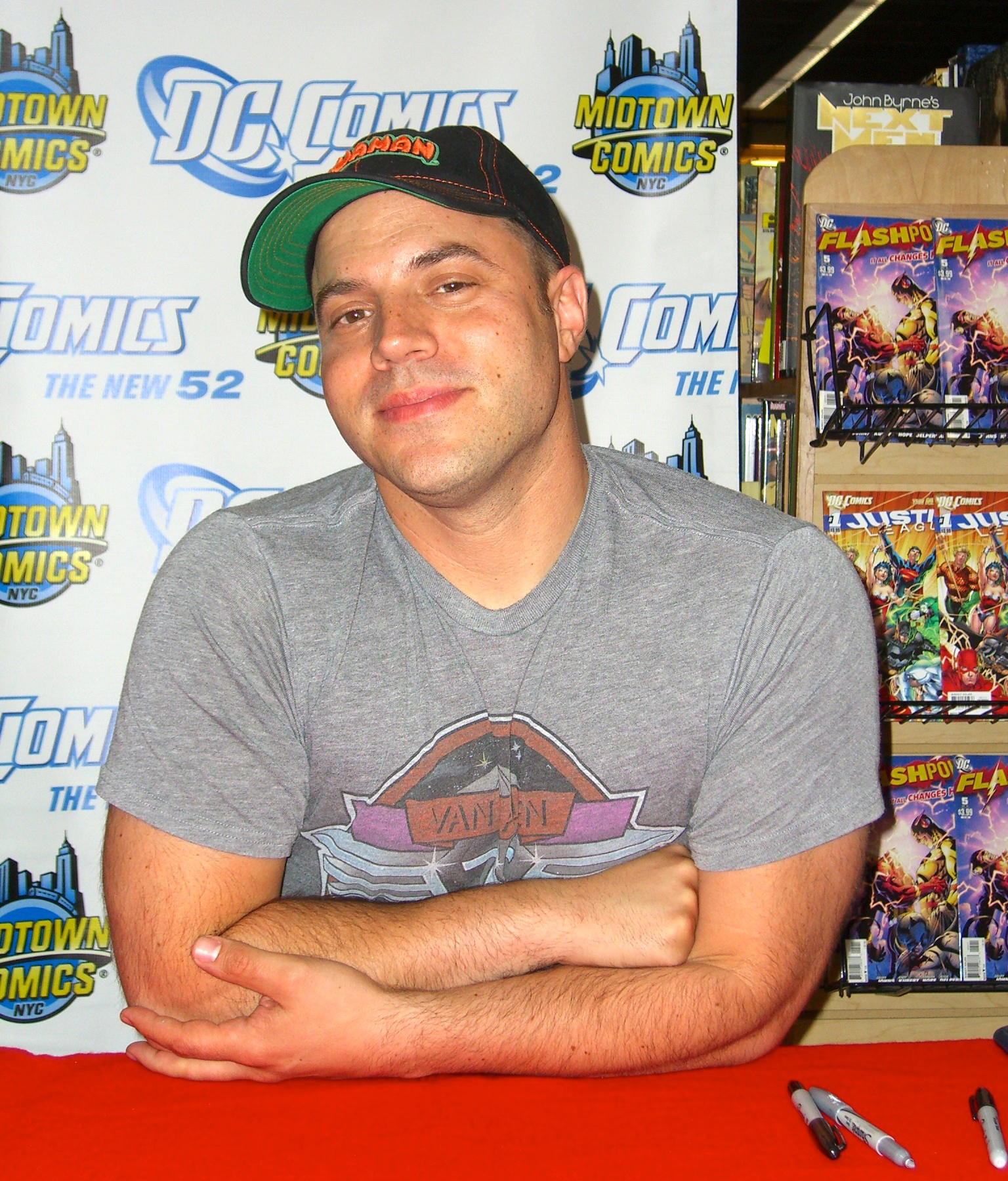
- Johns in 2011
- Born: Geoffrey Johns; January 25, 1973 (age 53); Detroit, Michigan, U.S.
- Education: Michigan State University
- Occupations: Comic book writer; screenwriter; producer
- Writing career
- Years active: 1996–present
- Notable works: Comics: JSA, The Flash, Teen Titans, Green Lantern, Infinite Crisis, 52, Action Comics, Blackest Night, Flashpoint, Justice League/Justice League of America, Shazam, Trinity War, Doomsday Clock, The Avengers, Ultimate X-Men; Television: Robot Chicken, Blade: The Series, The Flash, Titans, Doom Patrol, Batwoman, Stargirl, Superman & Lois
- Website: ghostmachinepro.com

Geoffrey Johns (born January 25, 1973) is an American comic book writer, screenwriter, and film and television producer. Johns's work on the DC Comics characters Green Lantern, Aquaman, The Flash, and Superman has drawn critical acclaim. His critically acclaimed work includes Sinestro Corps War, Blackest Night, Infinite Crisis, Throne of Atlantis, Flashpoint, Doomsday Clock, Superman: Last Son, and Superman: Brainiac. He co-created the DC character Courtney Whitmore based on his deceased sister. He also expanded the Green Lantern mythology, adding in new concepts and co-creating numerous characters. Among the DC characters and concepts he co-created are the Sinestro Corps, the Indigo Tribe, the Red Lantern Corps, the Black Lantern Corps, Larfleeze, Atrocitus, Bleez, Jessica Cruz, Simon Baz, Hunter Zolomon, Tar Pit, Miss Martian, and Christopher Kent.

He served as Chief Creative Officer (CCO) of DC Entertainment from 2010 to 2018 and as President and CCO from 2016 to 2018.

He is the co-founder and former co-chairman of DC Films and former co-runner of DC Extended Universe until 2018. In film, he was a producer or executive producer of Green Lantern (2011), Batman v Superman: Dawn of Justice (2016), Suicide Squad (2016), Wonder Woman (2017), Justice League (2017), Shazam! (2019), Birds of Prey (2020), co-wrote and produced the story for Aquaman (2018) and wrote the screenplay for Wonder Woman 1984 (2020).

Johns's involvement with DC Entertainment as producer, writer and executive has helped turn the DC Extended Universe franchise into the eleventh highest-grossing film franchise of all-time, having grossed over $5.6 billion at the global box office. The franchise's highest-grossing film, Aquaman, earned over $1.15 billion worldwide, becoming the highest-grossing DC film to-date.

He co-developed the TV series The Flash (2014–2023), Titans (2018–2023), and Doom Patrol (2019–2023) and created and produced the TV series Batwoman (2019–2022), Stargirl (2020–2022) and Superman & Lois (2020–2024). His other work in television includes writing and producing various episodes of Blade, Smallville and Arrow.

In 2018, he stepped down from his executive role at DC Entertainment to open a production company, Mad Ghost Productions, while continuing to work with Warner Bros on writing and producing film, television and comic book titles based on DC Extended Universe and other DC properties such as films Black Adam and Shazam! Fury of the Gods.

In 2023, he co-founded the media company Ghost Machine alongside several other comic book writers and artists to publish independent work.

== Early life ==
Geoff Johns was born January 25, 1973, in Detroit, Michigan, the son of Barbara and Fred Johns. He is of half-Lebanese ancestry and grew up in the suburbs of Grosse Pointe and Clarkston. As a child, Johns and his brother first discovered comics through an old box of comics they found in their grandmother's attic, which included copies of The Flash, Superman, Green Lantern, and Batman from the 1960s and 1970s. He has named the Flash as his favorite character, stating that he owns every issue of it.

Johns eventually began to patronize a comics shop in Traverse City, recalling that the first new comics he bought were Crisis on Infinite Earths #3 or 4 and The Flash #348 or 349. As Johns continued collecting comics, he gravitated toward DC Comics and later Vertigo, and drew comics. After graduating from Clarkston High School in 1991, he studied media arts, screenwriting, film production and film theory at Michigan State University. He graduated from Michigan State in 1995, and then moved to Los Angeles, California.

== Career ==
=== Early career ===
In Los Angeles, Johns cold-called the office of director Richard Donner looking for an internship, and while Johns was being transferred to various people, Donner picked up the phone by accident, leading to a conversation and the internship. Johns started off copying scripts, and after about two months, was hired as a production assistant for Donner, whom Johns regards as his mentor.

Johns visited New York City, where he met DC Comics personnel such as Eddie Berganza, reigniting his childhood interest in comics.

Berganza invited Johns to tour the DC Comics offices, and offered Johns the opportunity to suggest ideas, which led to Johns pitching Stars and S.T.R.I.P.E., a series based on the second Star-Spangled Kid and her stepfather, to editor Chuck Kim a year later. Johns expected to write comics "on the side", until he met David Goyer and James Robinson, who were working on JSA. After looking at Stars and S.T.R.I.P.E., Robinson offered Johns co-writing duties on JSA in 2000, and Johns credits both him and Mike Carlin with shepherding him into the comics industry. He also credits reading James Robinson's The Golden Age as the book responsible for his love of the characters featured in the book, and for his decision to accept writing duties on JSA.

That same year, Johns became the regular writer on The Flash ongoing series with issue 164. Johns's work on The Flash represents one example of his modeling of various elements in his stories after aspects of his birth town, explaining, "When I wrote The Flash, I turned Keystone City into Detroit, made it a car town. I make a lot of my characters from Detroit. I think self-made, blue-collar heroes represent Detroit. Wally West's Flash was like that. I took the inspiration of the city and the people there and used it in the books." Johns's Flash run concluded with #225.

He co-wrote a Beast Boy limited series with Ben Raab in 2000 and crafted the "Return to Krypton" story arc in the Superman titles with Pasqual Ferry in 2002. After writing The Avengers vol. 3 #57–76 (Oct. 2002–Feb. 2004) and Avengers Icons: The Vision #1–4 (Oct. 2002–Jan. 2003) for Marvel Comics, Johns oversaw the re-launch of Hawkman and Teen Titans.

Johns was responsible for the return of Hal Jordan in 2005 as the writer of the Green Lantern: Rebirth mini-series and subsequent Green Lantern ongoing title. Johns was the writer of the Infinite Crisis crossover limited series (December 2005–June 2006), a sequel to 1985's Crisis on Infinite Earths. Following this, Johns was one of four writers, with Mark Waid, Grant Morrison, and Greg Rucka, on the 2006–2007 weekly series 52.

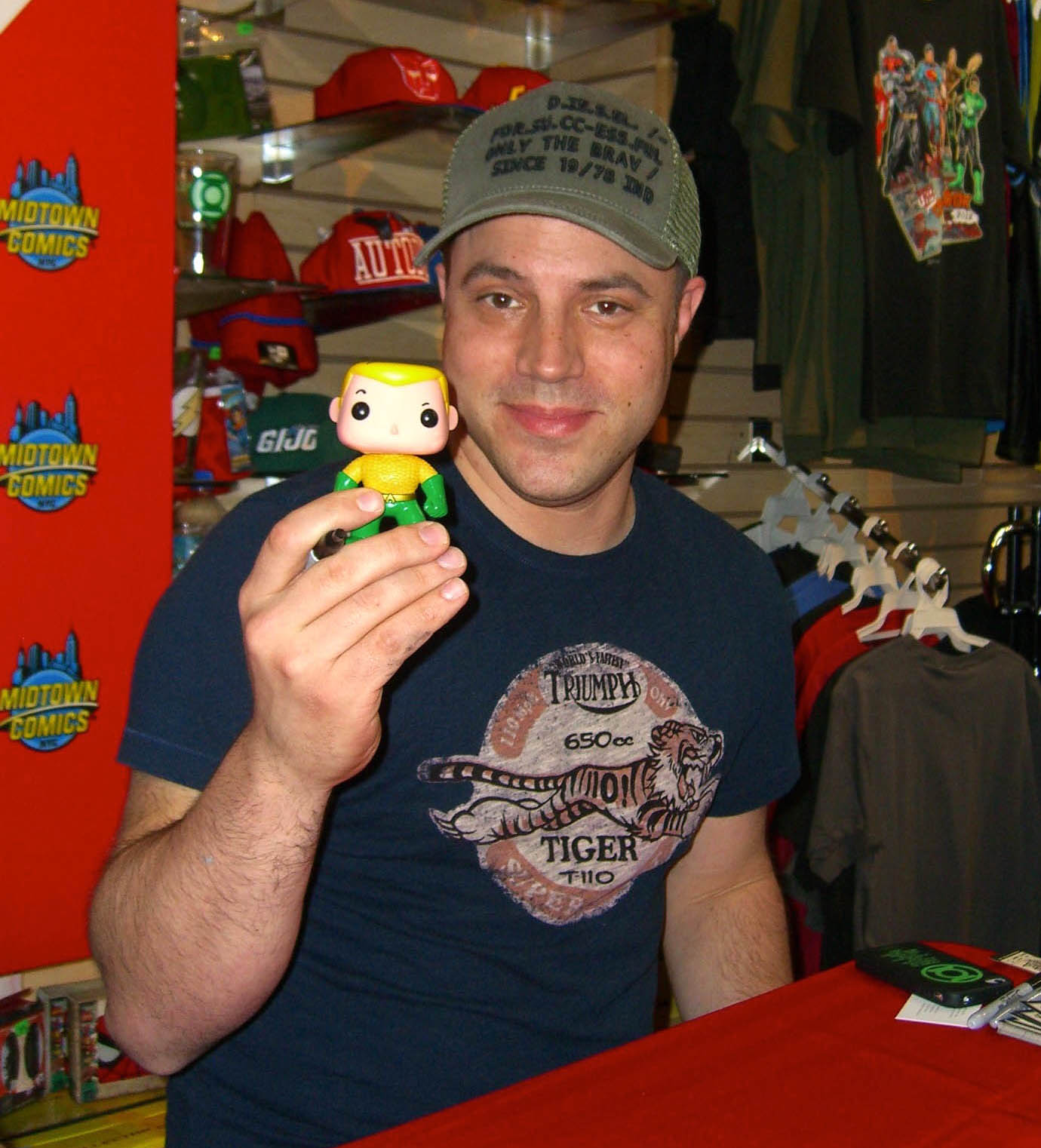
Johns holding up a Funko vinyl figure of Aquaman, one of the titles he wrote as part of The New 52

In 2006, Johns and Kurt Busiek co-wrote the "Up, Up and Away!" story arc in Superman and Action Comics. He then reunited with Richard Donner on the "Last Son" storyline in Action Comics with Donner co-plotting the series with his former assistant. The Justice Society of America series by Johns and artist Dale Eaglesham began in February 2007 and six months later, he and Jeff Katz launched the new Booster Gold series. That same year, Johns helmed the critically acclaimed "Sinestro Corps War" storyline in the Green Lantern titles. He wrote the "Final Crisis" one-shot Rage of the Red Lanterns with artist Shane Davis and collaborated with Gary Frank on Action Comics. Johns and Frank produced the "Brainiac" storyline in which Superman's adopted father Jonathan Kent was killed and retold Superman's origin story in 2009's Superman: Secret Origin.

Also in 2009, Johns teamed with artist Ethan Van Sciver on The Flash: Rebirth miniseries, which centered on the return of Barry Allen as the Flash and wrote the Blackest Night limited series. Commenting on Johns's creation of such concepts as the Blue Lantern Corps, the Red Lantern Corps, and the Indigo Tribe, DC Comics writer and executive Paul Levitz noted in 2010 that "One of Johns' sharpest additions to DC mythology is the notion that the Green Lanterns are but one color within a rainbow spectrum, and that the other hues have their own champions. Folding in old concepts and inventing new ones, Johns has established limitless story possibilities."

=== President and CCO of DC Entertainment ===
On February 18, 2010, Johns was named the Chief Creative Officer of DC Entertainment, which was established to expand the DC Comics brand across other media platforms. Johns stated that the position would not affect his writing. He then co-wrote the Brightest Day series with Peter Tomasi. He and Marv Wolfman were the principal writers of DC Universe Online, a massively multiplayer online role-playing game released in 2011.

In September 2011, following the conclusion of Johns's mini series, Flashpoint, and the crossover storyline of the same name, DC Comics instituted an initiative called The New 52, in which the publisher cancelled all of its superhero titles and relaunched 52 new series with #1 issues, wiping out most of the then-current continuity. Johns and artist Jim Lee, DC Comics' Co-Publisher, launched the line with a new Justice League series, written and illustrated by Johns and Lee, respectively. The series' first story arc was a new origin of the Justice League, which depicted the return of DC's primary superheroes to the team. Johns's contributions to The New 52 include a serialized Shazam! (Captain Marvel) backup feature in Justice League that began with issue #7, as well as the relaunched Aquaman and Green Lantern monthly titles.

Johns and Gary Frank collaborated on the Batman: Earth One graphic novel, an out of continuity story, released in mid-2012, which served as the first in a series of graphic novels intended to redefine Batman. In 2013, after writing Green Lantern for nine years, Johns ended his run with issue 20 of the New 52 series, which was released May 22, 2013. DC Comics' All Access webcast announced on February 4, 2014, that Johns would be writing the Superman series which would be drawn by John Romita Jr. The Johns/Romita Jr. team was joined by inker Klaus Janson. In May 2016, Johns was promoted to President and Chief Creative Officer of DC Entertainment and reported to Diane Nelson, the President of DC Entertainment.

Johns and Gary Frank collaborated on Doomsday Clock, a limited series featuring Superman and Doctor Manhattan. Johns and Richard Donner co-wrote "The Car" chapter in Action Comics #1000 (June 2018) which was drawn by Olivier Coipel.

In June 2018, Johns stepped down from his executive role at DC Entertainment and entered into a writer and producer deal with Warner Bros. and DC Entertainment. He opened Mad Ghost Productions, a production company that works on film, television and comic books based on DC Comics properties.

=== After DC Entertainment ===
At San Diego Comic-Con in 2018, DC announced a new "pop-up" imprint, The Killing Zone, to be curated by Johns. It was initially set to begin publishing in May 2019. In May 2020, Johns confirmed that the imprint was in development.

In November 2020, it was announced that Johns would launch a new creator-owned series from Image Comics titled Geiger with long-time collaborator Gary Frank, to debut in April 2021. The series would be his first independent comics series in more than ten years. In September 2021 it was reported that Johns and Frank would expand "The Unnamed Universe" of Geiger, starting with Junkyard Joe in October 2022.

On October 12, 2023, Johns and a group of colleagues announced at the New York Comic Con that they were forming a cooperative media company called Ghost Machine, which would publish creator-owned comics, and allow the participating creators to benefit from the development of their intellectual properties. The company publishes its books through Image Comics, and its other founders includes Brad Meltzer, Jason Fabok, Gary Frank, Bryan Hitch, Francis Manapul, and Peter J. Tomasi, all of whom would produce comics work exclusively through that company. Johns's inaugural work for the company was writing Geiger: Ground Zero, a two-issue series drawing by Frank that serves as a prequel to their 2021 miniseries of the same name. Set in a post-apocalyptic future, the book centers upon a man named Tariq Geiger who lost his family and his humanity in a nuclear war, when he was transformed into the Glowing Man, a being who can absorb radiation but struggles to contain it. Ground Zero would be followed by an ongoing Geiger series.

=== Film ===
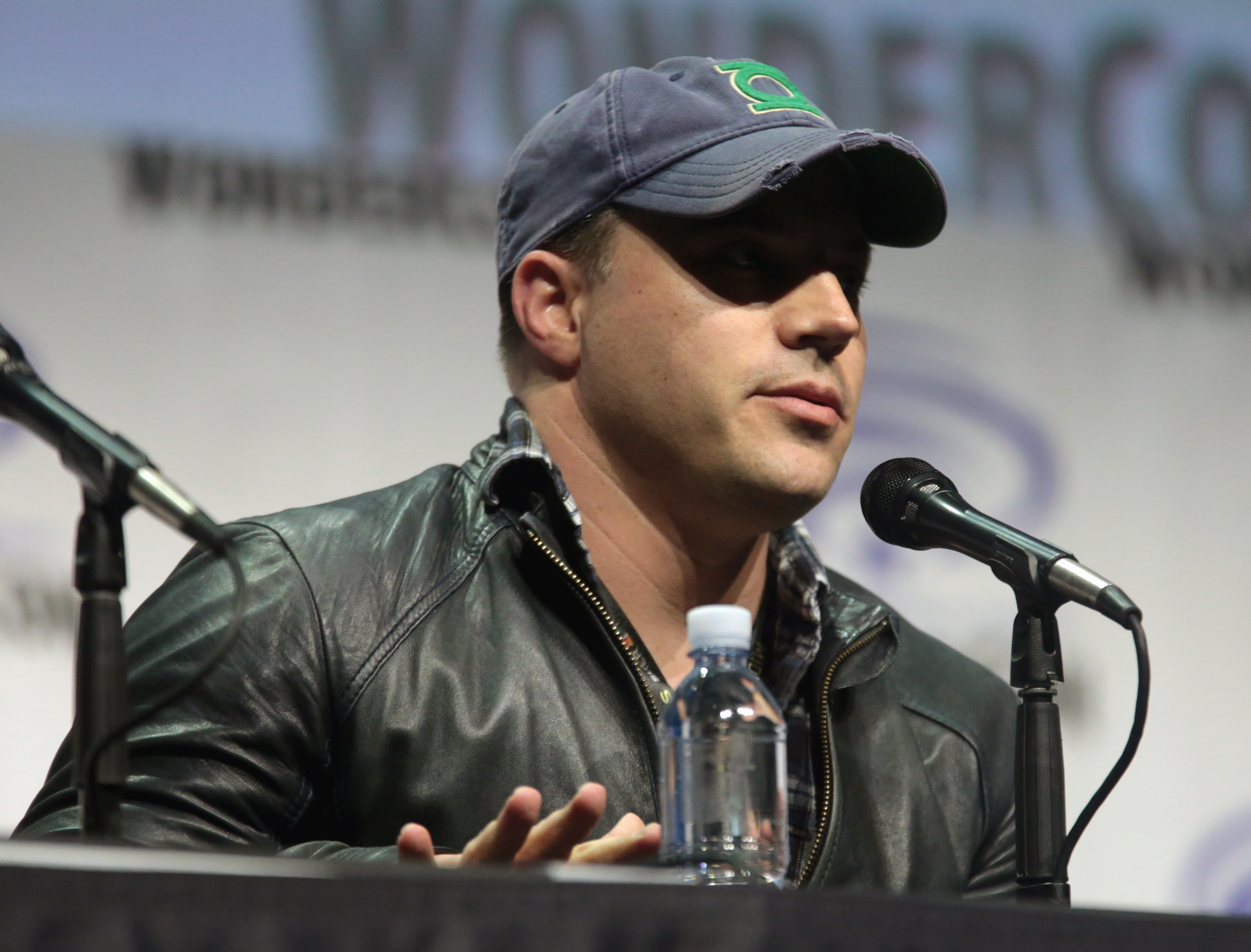
Johns speaking at the 2017 WonderCon to promote DC Comics film projects

Johns served as a co-producer and creative consultant for the 2011 Green Lantern film directed by Martin Campbell and starring Ryan Reynolds.

Johns was an executive producer on the 2016 film Batman v Superman: Dawn of Justice. Following negative critical reception to the film, Johns and Jon Berg were named to jointly run the DC Extended Universe and a newly established Warner Bros. division, DC Films, in May 2016. They served as producers on the 2017 film Justice League. Johns also co-wrote the story for Aquaman with James Wan and Will Beall, co-wrote the story for then planned Green Lantern Corps with David S. Goyer and co-wrote Wonder Woman 1984 with Patty Jenkins and David Callaham. In January 2018, after Justice League underperformed at the box office, Jon Berg was replaced by Walter Hamada as the head of DC Films, with Johns still working "closely" with Hamada on future productions.

=== Television ===
"Recruit", a 2005 episode of the Superman prequel series Smallville, on which Johns's studio mate Jeph Loeb was a writer–producer, featured a villain by the name of Geoff Johns. In 2008, Johns wrote "Legion", the eleventh episode of the eighth season, in which he introduced the three core members of the Legion of Super-Heroes. At the 2009 San Diego Comic-Con, he announced that he was writing another Smallville episode, titled "Society", based on the Justice Society of America. The success of his first episode and the ambitious nature of his follow-up episode enabled the producers to transform it into a two-part story, which subsequently aired as a feature-length episode titled "Absolute Justice".

In 2006, Johns co-wrote the story for the Justice League Unlimited episode "Ancient History", which starred Green Lantern, Hawkgirl, Hawkman, Shadow Thief, and Vixen.

Johns and David S. Goyer co-wrote the pilot for the Spike TV drama Blade: The Series, which premiered in June 2006. Johns served as one of the writing staff on the television show. Later that year, Johns teamed up with Matthew Senreich of Robot Chicken fame to write the screenplay for a holiday family-friendly movie titled Naughty or Nice for Dimension Films. Johns and Senreich are billed as directors of the movie, with actor/producer Seth Green set to provide a lead voice as well as serving as voice director on the film. This association led to Johns contributing material to the fourth season of Robot Chicken.

In 2012, Johns joined The CW's Green Arrow origin series Arrow, as a writer. He first contributed to the first-season episode "Muse of Fire", which served as the introduction of The Huntress, the teleplay for which he co-wrote with executive producer Marc Guggenheim from a story by co-creator Andrew Kreisberg. Later in the season, Johns wrote the sixteenth episode, "Dead to Rights". The episode was directed by frequent Johns collaborator Glen Winter.

On July 30, 2013, it was announced at the summer TCA tour that Johns and Arrow co-creators Kreisberg and Greg Berlanti would be introducing Barry Allen in the second season of the show, with the potential of a spin-off for the character with the 20th episode acting as a backdoor pilot. CW executives were so pleased with the handling of the character that they forwent the backdoor pilot, in favor of a full-fledged version. In May 2014, The Flash was picked up to series, to premiere later that year. Johns serves as co-developer and executive producer. He co-wrote, with Kai Yu Wu, the episodes "Going Rogue", which introduces the villain Leonard Snart / Captain Cold to the series, and "Revenge of the Rogues", which brought the rogue Heat Wave to the series fully after being introduced off screen in "Going Rogue".

In a July 2015 interview, Johns said he was collaborating with Reginald Hudlin and Denys Cowan on a live-action digital Static series from DC and Warner Bros. Blue Ribbon division.

Kreisberg, a producer on the TV series Supergirl, credits Johns with the idea that Hank Henshaw was really Martian Manhunter during production of that series' pilot in 2015.

In July 2018, Johns announced that he would be writing and executive-producing a DC Universe television series about Courtney Whitmore, a character that he created, titled Stargirl. The series premiered in May 2020.

In April 2020, it was reported that Johns is to produce a series based on Green Lantern for HBO Max. This show eventually was redeveloped and became Lanterns, though it was produced without Johns' affiliation.

In October 2022, it was announced that Paramount Television Studios would develop a TV adaptation of Geiger from Johns and Justin Simien, with Johns writing the pilot, serving as showrunner, and executive producing along with Jamie Iracleanos for Mad Ghost Productions, and Gary Frank.

== Personal life ==
Johns's younger sister, Courtney, was a victim of the TWA Flight 800 crash. The DC Comics superheroine Courtney Whitmore/Stargirl, whom Johns created, is based on her.

In a 2010 interview, Johns named Steve McNiven as an artist he would like to collaborate with, J. Michael Straczynski's run on Thor as his then-favorite ongoing comic book.

Johns is a comic book retailer who co-owns Earth-2 Comics in Northridge, California.

== Selected bibliography ==
- Stars and S.T.R.I.P.E. #0-14 (1999–2000)
- JSA #6–77, 81 (2000–2006)
  - Hawkman #1–6, 8–25 (2002–2003)
  - Justice Society of America vol. 3 #1–26 (2007–2009)
- The Flash vol. 2 #164–225 (2000–2005)
  - The Flash: Rebirth #1–6 (2009–2010)
  - The Flash vol. 3 #1–12 (2010–2011)
- Teen Titans vol. 3, #1–26, 29–46, 50 (2003–2007)
- Green Lantern: Rebirth #1–6 (2004–2005)
  - Green Lantern vol. 4 #1–67 (2005–2011)
  - Green Lantern vol. 5 #0–20 (2011–2013)
- Infinite Crisis #1–7 (2005–2006)
- 52 #1–52 (2006–2007)
- Action Comics #837–840, 844–846, 850–851, 855–873 (2006–2009)
- Booster Gold vol. 2 #0–10 (2007–2008)
- Superman: Secret Origin #1–6 (2009–2010)
- Blackest Night #0–8 (2009–2010)
- Brightest Day #0–24 (2010–2011)
- Flashpoint #1–5 (2011)
- Justice League vol. 2 #0–50 (2011–2016)
- Aquaman vol. 5 #0–19, 21–25 (2011–2013)
- Forever Evil #1–7 (2013–2014)
- Batman: Earth One Volume 1–3 (2012–2021)
- DC Universe: Rebirth (2016)
- Doomsday Clock #1–12 (2018–2020)
- Shazam! vol. 2 #1–11, 13–14 (2019–2020)
- Batman: Three Jokers #1–3 (2020)
- Flashpoint Beyond #0–6 (2022)
- The New Golden Age #1 (2022)
- Justice Society of America #1–12 (2023–2024)

== Filmography ==
=== Films ===
Year	Title	Credited as		Notes
Year	Title	Writer	Producer	Notes
1997	Conspiracy Theory	No	No	Assistant to Richard Donner, as Geoffrey Johns
1997	Double Tap	No	No	Assistant to Mills Goodloe and Alex Collet
1998	Lethal Weapon 4	No	No	Assistant to Richard Donner
2011	Green Lantern: Emerald Knights	Yes	No	
2011	Green Lantern	No	Yes	
2013	Justice League: The Flashpoint Paradox	No	Executive	
2016	Batman v Superman: Dawn of Justice	No	Executive	
2016	Suicide Squad	Uncredited	Executive	Additional photography/reshoots
2017	Wonder Woman	Uncredited	Executive	
2017	Justice League	No	Executive	
2018	Aquaman	Story	Executive	Wrote story with James Wan and Will Beall
2019	Shazam!	No	Executive	
2020	Birds of Prey	No	Executive	
2020	Wonder Woman 1984	Yes	Executive	Wrote screenplay with Patty Jenkins and David Callaham, story with Patty Jenkins
2022	Black Adam	No	Executive	
2023	Shazam! Fury of the Gods	No	Executive	
2023	The Flash	Uncredited	No	Additional literary material

=== Television ===
Year	Title	Credited as		Notes
Year	Title	Writer	Producer	Notes
2005–2006	Justice League Unlimited	Yes	No	1 episode
2006	Blade: The Series	Yes	Consulting	Writer (4 episodes), consulting producer (12 episodes)
2008–2009	Robot Chicken	Yes	No	5 episodes
2009	Titan Maximum	Story	Yes	Story by (8 episodes), co-producer (9 episodes)
2009–2011	Smallville	Yes	No	Writer (3 episodes), actor (1 episode)
2010	Robot Chicken: Star Wars Episode III	Yes	No	
2012	Robot Chicken DC Comics Special	Yes	Executive	
2012	Metal Hurlant Chronicles	Yes	No	1 episode
2012–2014	Arrow	Yes	No	5 episodes
2014	Robot Chicken DC Comics Special 2: Villains in Paradise	Yes	Executive	
2014–2018	The Flash	Yes	No	Developed with Greg Berlanti and Andrew Kreisberg; Writer (4 episodes)
2015	Robot Chicken DC Comics Special III: Magical Friendship	Yes	No	
2018–2023	Titans	Yes	Executive	Created with Akiva Goldsman and Greg Berlanti; Writer (5 episodes)
2019–2023	Doom Patrol	No	Executive	
2019–2022	Batwoman	No	Executive	
2020–2022	Stargirl	Yes	Executive	Also creator and showrunner Writer (4 episodes)
2021–2024	Superman & Lois	No	Executive	

== Awards and recognition ==
- 2002 Wizard Fan Award for Breakout Talent (for The Flash)
- 2005 Wizard Fan Award for Best Writer (for The Flash, Infinite Crisis, Green Lantern and Teen Titans)
- 2006 Wizard Fan Award for Best Writer (for Infinite Crisis)
- 2008 Project Fanboy Award for Best Writer
- 2009 Project Fanboy Award for Best Writer
- 2009 Spike TV Scream Award for Best Comic Book Writer
- 2010 Spike TV Scream Award for Best Comic Book Writer (for Blackest Night, Brightest Day, The Flash and Green Lantern)
- 2024 Ringo Award Winner for Best Series for Geiger: Ground Zero

Preceded by James Robinson; David S. Goyer	Justice Society of America writer 2000–2009 (with David S. Goyer in 2000–2003)	Succeeded by Bill Willingham; Lilah Sturges
Preceded by Mark Waid; Brian Augustyn	The Flash writer 2000–2005	Succeeded by Joey Cavalieri
Preceded by William Messner-Loebs	Hawkman writer 2002–2004 (with James Robinson in 2002–2003)	Succeeded by Jimmy Palmiotti; Justin Gray
Preceded by Jeph Loeb	Superman writer 2002–2003	Succeeded by Steven T. Seagle
Preceded by Kurt Busiek	The Avengers writer 2002–2004	Succeeded by Chuck Austen
Preceded by Dan Jurgens (Teen Titans vol. 2); Peter David (Young Justice)	Teen Titans writer 2003–2007	Succeeded by Adam Beechen
Preceded by Ron Marz	Green Lantern writer 2005–2013	Succeeded by Robert Venditti
Preceded by Kurt Busiek	JLA writer 2005 (with Allan Heinberg)	Succeeded by Bob Harras
Preceded by Gail Simone	Action Comics writer 2006–2009 (with Richard Donner in 2006–2008)	Succeeded by Greg Rucka
Preceded by Dan Jurgens	Booster Gold writer 2007–2008 (with Jeff Katz)	Succeeded by Dan Jurgens
Preceded by Alan Burnett	The Flash writer 2010–2011	Succeeded by Francis Manapul; Brian Buccellato
Preceded by Keith Giffen; J. M. DeMatteis	Justice League writer 2011–2016	Succeeded by Bryan Hitch
Preceded by James Robinson	Justice League of America writer 2013	Succeeded by Matt Kindt
Preceded by Tad Williams	Aquaman writer 2011–2013	Succeeded by Jeff Parker
Preceded by Scott Lobdell	Superman writer 2014–2015	Succeeded by Gene Luen Yang
Preceded by Marc Guggenheim	Justice Society of America writer 2022	Succeeded by Incumbent
