= Sylvester Pemberton =

- Sylvester Pemberton as the Star-Spangled Kid, as depicted in All-Star Comics #58 (January 1976). Art by Ric Estrada.

Publication information
- Publisher: DC Comics
- First appearance: Star Spangled Comics #1 (October 1941)
- Created by: Jerry Siegel; Hal Sherman

In-story information
- Alter ego: Sylvester Pemberton Jr.
- Team affiliations: Seven Soldiers of Victory; All-Star Squadron; Justice Society of America; Infinity Inc.
- Partnerships: Pat Dugan
- Notable aliases: Star-Spangled Kid, Skyman
- Abilities: Superb athlete; Hand to hand combatant; Cosmic converter belt

Sylvester Pemberton Jr., alternately known as The Star-Spangled Kid and Skyman, is a superhero in the DC Comics universe. Sylvester first appeared in Star Spangled Comics #1 (October 1941) and was created by Jerry Siegel and Hal Sherman.

Starting October 1941, the character headlined his own comic, Star Spangled Comics, which introduced his sidekick, Stripesy. Fall 1941 was a boom period for patriotic superheroes as the country prepared to enter World War II; during this period, comic book publishers also launched Miss Victory, Miss America, U.S. Jones, the Fighting Yank, the Flag, Captain Flag and Yank and Doodle, among others.

The Star-Spangled Kid and his sidekick, Stripesy, appeared in Star Spangled Comics until issue #86 (November 1948). The comic continued after that, primarily as a vehicle for Robin the Boy Wonder. In issue #131 (August 1952), the book was renamed Star Spangled War Stories. The Star-Spangled Kid also appeared in World's Finest Comics from 1942 to 1945.

A version of Sylvester Pemberton, named Starman, appears in Stargirl, portrayed by Joel McHale.

== Fictional character biography ==
=== Star-Spangled Kid ===
The original Star-Spangled Kid was Sylvester Pemberton Jr., a Golden Age character. He became the Star-Spangled Kid to battle enemies spies and fifth columnists during World War II and the Cold War. Sylvester was a spoiled, pampered rich kid who snuck out of the house to fight crime and evil; his parents never suspected what their son was up to.

He was unique in that he was a kid superhero who operated with an adult sidekick, Stripesy a.k.a. Pat Dugan, the family's chauffeur. Both he and Dugan were superb acrobats and had sufficient training in hand-to-hand combat. They devised a series of acrobatic maneuvers that allowed them to build upon one another's strengths: the Kid's agility and Dugan's prowess. They also built the Star Rocket Racer, a bubble-topped limousine with the functions of a rocket and helicopter.

According to Jess Nevins' Encyclopedia of Golden Age Superheroes, the Kid's enemies "range from ordinary criminals and Axis agents to the mad scientist Dr. Weerd, False Face, the Black Magician, the moon-mad Moonglow, Presto the criminal magician, and the rope-gimmick using Rope."

The Kid and Stripesy were members of the Seven Soldiers of Victory as well as the All-Star Squadron. In 1948, Pemberton and Dugan were joined by Merry, the Girl of 1000 Gimmicks, who supplanted The Kid and Stripsey from their own feature.

The Seven Soldiers were lost in time and rescued decades later by the Justice League of America and the Justice Society of America. Aquaman, Wildcat and the Silver Age Green Lantern rescued the Star-Spangled Kid, who was 50,000 years in the past and hiding in a cave so his flu would not wipe out humanity. Sylvester then joined the JSA, at which time a then-injured Starman loaned him his cosmic rod. It was later revealed that Starman wanted the young man to become his heir as neither of his sons expressed interest in carrying the mantle. Soon afterward, the Kid refined the technology of the rod, devising a belt with similar powers such as energy projection, flight and matter transmutation. Eventually, Sylvester temporarily retired from superheroics to reclaim his inheritance and his father's business, plus movie studio Stellar Studios, from his corrupt nephew, who was using those funds to run his own evil organization, Strike Force.

=== Skyman ===
Pemberton's debut as Skyman in Infinity, Inc. #31 (October 1986). Art by Todd McFarlane.

Sylvester later changes his name to Skyman and becomes the leader of Infinity Inc. During this period, he forms a partnership with Los Angeles to commission the team as for-hire protectors. He also purchases property to revitalize related movie production facilities.

During a battle with Skyman, Harlequin manipulates Solomon Grundy into using Mister Bones' cyanide touch to kill Skyman. Pat Dugan's stepdaughter, Courtney Whitmore, finds Sylvester's Star-Spangled Kid suit and cosmic belt and Pat's old Stripesy costume while snooping through Pat's belongings. She steals Sylvester's suit and belt and, after redesigning the suit, calls herself the second Star-Spangled Kid, but only in order to annoy Pat as revenge for him marrying her mother and moving her family to a new state. She later changes her codename to Stargirl after an adventure confronting her convict father to resolve her issues with her personal life.

In the series 52, Lex Luthor obtains the rights to Infinity Inc.'s name from the Pemberton family and passes the Skyman mantle to a new superhero named Jacob Colby. Colby is later killed by Everyman, who assumes his form.

== Powers and abilities ==
Star-Spangled Kid has no superpowers, but is a superb athlete and hand-to-hand combatant. For a time he used Starman's cosmic rod. Later, he wore a "cosmic converter belt" which enabled him to fly, increased his strength and agility, and gave him the ability to create solid light objects and project energy blasts. When he reconfigured the belt into his new costume as Skyman, he initially only had the power of flight, but as time went on, he modified the suit so it possessed all of the other powers that the converter belt had as well.

== In other media ==
- Sylvester Pemberton / Star-Spangled Kid appears in the Smallville episode "Absolute Justice", portrayed by Jim Shield. This version wielded the Cosmic Staff and is a member of the Justice Society of America (JSA) who previously operated in the 1970s. After learning Icicle is killing his teammates, Pemberton warns Chloe Sullivan before sacrificing himself to save her while the Cosmic Staff eventually ends up in Courtney Whitmore's possession.
- Sylvester Pemberton appears in Stargirl, portrayed by Joel McHale. In addition to operating as the Star-Spangled Kid and a member of the Seven Soldiers of Victory as a teenager, this version went on to operate as Starman, leader of the Justice Society of America (JSA) whose costume is inspired by his time as Skyman. Ten years prior to the series, he and the JSA were attacked by the Injustice Society of America (ISA), during which Pemberton was mortally wounded and entered a state of suspended animation. In the present, Courtney Whitmore finds the Cosmic Staff and uses it to become Stargirl, after which she frees Pemberton.
