= Jerry Siegel =

American comic book writer (1914–1996)

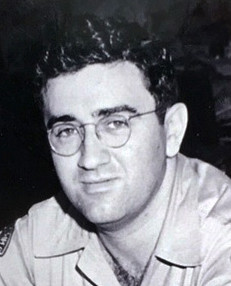
- Siegel during his service in the U.S. Army, c. 1944
- Born: Jerome Siegel; October 17, 1914 Cleveland, Ohio, U.S.
- Died: January 28, 1996 (aged 81) Los Angeles, California, U.S.
- Area: Writer
- Pseudonyms: Joe Carter, Jerry Ess, Leger
- Notable works: Superman, Action Comics #1
- Awards: Inkpot Award (1975); Will Eisner Comic Book Hall of Fame, 1992; Jack Kirby Hall of Fame, 1993; The Bill Finger Award For Excellence in Comic Book Writing, 2005
- Spouses: Bella Siegel (m. 1939; div. 1948) Joanne Siegel (m. 1948)
- Children: 2

Signature
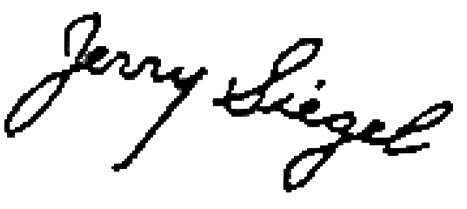

Jerome "Jerry" Siegel (/ˈsiːɡəl/ SEE-gəl; October 17, 1914 – January 28, 1996) was an American comic book writer. He was the co-creator of Superman, in collaboration with his friend Joe Shuster, published by DC Comics. They also created Doctor Occult, who was later featured in The Books of Magic. Siegel and Shuster were inducted into the comic book industry's Will Eisner Comic Book Hall of Fame in 1992 and the Jack Kirby Hall of Fame in 1993. With Bernard Baily, Siegel also co-created the long-running DC character The Spectre. Siegel created ten of the earliest members of the Legion of Super-Heroes, one of DC's most popular team books, which is set in the 30th Century. Siegel also used pseudonyms including Joe Carter and Jerry Ess.

== Biography ==
=== Early life ===
Siegel was born on October 17, 1914, in Cleveland, Ohio, the son of Lithuanian Jewish immigrants who arrived in New York in 1900, having fled antisemitism in their native Lithuania, then part of the Russian Empire. His father was born Mikhel Iankel Segalovich and his mother was born Sora Meita Khaikels, but they changed their names to Michael and Sarah Siegel after moving to the United States. Jerry was the last of six children (Isabel, Leo, Minerva, Roslyn, and Harry). His father was a tailor and owned a clothing store. On June 2, 1932, Michael was punched hard in the chest by a shoplifter and suffered a fatal heart attack, while Sarah died of a heart attack on August 17, 1941.

Siegel's family moved to the Jewish neighborhood of Glenville, Cleveland, in 1928, and he attended Glenville High School. As a sci-fi fan, he created the first sci-fi fanzine in 1929 called Cosmic Stories, containing stories he had written and that the pulp magazines Amazing Stories and Science Wonder Stories rejected when he tried to publish with them. At about age 16, while at Glenville, he befriended Joe Shuster. Siegel described his friendship with the similarly shy and bespectacled Shuster: "When Joe and I first met, it was like the right chemicals coming together." They shared a love of science fiction, adventure fiction, and movies.

Siegel and Shutter both graduated from high school in June 1934.

=== Early work for DC Comics (1935–1943) ===
Unable to afford college, he worked various delivery jobs, all the while courting publishers. In the summer of 1935, still living in Cleveland, he and Shuster began selling comic-book stories to National Allied Publications, the primary precursor of DC Comics, in New York.

Siegel and Shuster had been developing the Superman story and character since 1933, hoping to sell it as a syndicated newspaper comic-strip. But after years of fruitless soliciting to the syndicates, Siegel and Shuster agreed to publish Superman in a comic book. In March 1938, they sold all rights to Superman to the comic-book publisher Detective Comics, Inc., another forerunner of DC, for $130 ($2,973 when adjusted for inflation).

Siegel and Shuster later regretted their decision to sell Superman after he became an astonishing success. DC Comics now owned the character and reaped the royalties. Nevertheless, DC Comics retained Siegel and Shuster as the principal writer and artist for the Superman comics, and they were well-paid because they were popular with the readers. For instance, in 1942 they together earned $63,776.46 (equivalent to $1,300,000 in 2025). Siegel bought a house in University Heights and a car.

Siegel was conscripted into the United States Army on June 28, 1943. His service number was 35067731. He was trained at Fort George G. Meade, where he was trained as an "Airplane Engine Mechanic, a Film Editor, Motion Picture Cutter, Public Relations Man or Playwright (Motion Picture Writer) or Reporter". He was posted in Honolulu, where he was assigned a writing job at the military newspaper Stars and Stripes. He focused mainly on comedy columns. Siegel was discharged on January 21, 1946, at the rank of Technician 4th Grade.

=== Postwar career (1946–1959) ===
During his military service in Hawaii, Siegel learned from his friend Shuster that DC Comics had published a story featuring a child version of Superman called "Superboy", which was based on a story that Siegel had submitted to DC Comics, but which DC Comics had not bought. Because DC Comics never bought the copyright to Superboy from Siegel, Siegel sued DC Comics for the rights. A second claim they had was that DC had cheated them out of royalties from the Superman radio show and the merchandise. Siegel and Shuster simultaneously sued for the rights to Superman as well. At the conclusion of the trial, Siegel and Shuster agreed to relinquish the copyrights of both Superman and Superboy in exchange for a settlement of just over $94,000 (equivalent to $1,300,000 in 2025). Siegel's 1948 divorce papers suggest he was left with $29,000 after paying his court fees but prior to settling his divorce.

After the war, Siegel moved to New York. Between 1937 and 1947 (i.e., during the span of their contract), Siegel and Shuster had together earned more than $400,000 (roughly equivalent to $7,900,000 in 2025) while working at DC Comics.

After leaving DC Comics in late 1947, Siegel and Shuster created the comedic superhero Funnyman, which proved unsuccessful. This was their last collaboration. Siegel then took freelance writing jobs. Some of them include the newspaper strip Tallulah, Lars of Mars, and G.I. Joe. The publisher Ziff-Davis hired him as a comic-book editor in 1951, but its comics division closed after less than a year in business. Siegel never found steady work, and fell upon hard times. By 1959, he and his family were living in a one-bedroom apartment in Great Neck, Long Island, and struggling to pay their bills.

=== Return to DC and lawsuits (1959–1975) ===
Siegel returned to DC Comics in 1959 at the prompting of his second wife. Although he did write some Superman stories, he no longer had any creative control, but instead answered to the direction of the editor Mort Weisinger. During this time, he wrote extensively about the team the Legion of Super-Heroes, adding many enduring characters to its cast. Siegel's contributions during this time are difficult to determine because DC Comics did not generally give creator bylines. His last work for DC was the lead story in Adventure Comics #341 (February 1966). DC Comics ceased giving him work in 1966, when the company learned Siegel and Shuster were planning a second lawsuit to reclaim the copyright to Superman. He lost that lawsuit.

Siegel again fell into hard financial times after this second dismissal, as he was unable to find regular writing work. For a period of seven years, he worked as a typist in the mailroom for the Los Angeles Public Utilities Commission, later telling an employee newsletter "[w]ith all the troubles and prolonged litigation I have had over, I just wanted to hide out." In 1975, upon hearing that Warner Bros. was producing a Superman film, Siegel alerted the press to his condition. In response, Warner Bros, agreed to give Siegel and Shuster a lifetime stipend of $20,000 a year (later increased to $30,000) in exchange for not contesting ownership of the copyright to Superman.

=== Amalgamated Press ===
After leaving DC Comics, Siegel wrote The Spider for the British comic Lion, published by Fleetway Publications. His episodes were published from January 1966 to February 1969.

== Writing career ==
=== School years ===
Siegel wrote for his school's weekly newspaper, The Glenville Torch. One of his known works for that newspaper was Goober the Mighty, a parody of Tarzan. Joseph Shuster provided illustrations for some of Siegel's Goober stories. This was their first known collaboration as writer and artist.

Siegel also self-published a fanzine called Science Fiction: The Advance Guard of Future Civilization. In the third issue of this fanzine, he published a short story titled "The Reign of the Superman" under the pseudonym "Herbert S. Fine". The story is about a vagrant named Bill Dunn who gains vast psychic powers after taking an experimental drug. Dunn then calls himself "the Superman" and proceeds to use his powers maliciously.

In 1933, Siegel and Shuster began making amateur comic strips together. They self-published their work in a fanzine titled Popular Comics.

=== DC Comics ===
Siegel and Shuster began working for DC Comics (then known as National Allied Publications) (Note: National Allied Publications was founded in 1935 by Malcolm Wheeler-Nicholson. Due to financial difficulties, Wheeler-Nicholson formed a corporation with Harry Donenfeld and Jack Liebowitz called Detective Comics, Inc. It was under the DC label that Action Comics #1 (cover-dated June 1938) was published. In 1937, Wheeler-Nicholson sold his stake in National Allied Publications to Donenfeld and Liebowitz as part of a bankruptcy settlement. On September 30, 1946, these two companies merged to become National Comics Publications. In 1961, the company become known as National Periodical Publications. In 1967 National Periodical Publications was purchased by Kinney National Company, which later purchased Warner Bros.-Seven Arts and became Warner Communications. In 1977, National Periodical Publications changed its name to DC Comics, which had been its nickname since 1940.) in 1935. Siegel's writing career there was interrupted in June 1943 when he was conscripted into the Army, though he continued to receive credit for stories written by ghostwriters. After his discharge, he sued DC Comics for the rights to Superman and Superboy, and was consequently given no more freelance work from the publisher. In 1959, he returned to DC as a writer, and was dropped again in 1967 when he again attempted to take back the copyright to Superman.

During his first tenure at DC Comics (1935–1943), Siegel created the following characters:

- Henri Duval, a French swashbuckler, first appeared in New Fun Comics #6 (October 1935), lasted only a few issues.
- Doctor Occult, paranormal investigator, ran from New Fun Comics #6 (October 1935) to #32 (June 1938).
- Radio Squad, police serial, ran from 1936 to 1943 in New Fun Comics.
- Slam Bradley, a fist-fighting vigilante, first appeared in Detective Comics #1 (March 1937)
- Spy, serial starring the globe-trotting investigator Bart Regan and his female sidekick Sally Norris, ran from Detective Comics #1 (March 1937) and ended in issue #83 (January 1944).
- Superman, a costumed vigilante with superhuman strength, first appeared in Action Comics #1 (cover-dated June 1938). Co-created with artist Joe Shuster.
- Superboy, a child version of Superman, first appeared in More Fun Comics #101 (without Siegel's consent).
- The Presence, a fictional representation of the Abrahamic God, first appeared in More Fun Comics #52.
- The Spectre, a ghostly avenger, first appeared in More Fun Comics #52 (February 1940).
- Star-Spangled Kid and Stripesy, masked heroes, first appeared in Star Spangled Comics #1 (October 1941); co-created with artist Hal Sherman.

During his second tenure at DC Comics (1959–1966), Siegel created several characters relating to the Legion of Super-Heroes, including members Bouncing Boy, Brainiac 5, Triplicate Girl, Invisible Kid, Matter-Eater Lad, Phantom Girl, and Chameleon Boy; and enemies Cosmic King, Lightning Lord, and Saturn Queen, who are part of the Legion of Super-Villains.

During his second tenure as writer at DC Comics, Siegel did not receive any byline for his stories, which was the normal policy of DC Comics at the time.

=== Funnyman ===
Siegel and Shuster conceived Funnyman, a clownish superhero, while they were still working for DC Comics. They anticipated a decline in the popularity of conventional superheroes, and thought a comedy hybrid character would have sustainable appeal. Unlike other characters they created, Siegel and Shuster were determined to retain the copyright to Funnyman. This was unacceptable to DC Comics, so they instead made a deal with Magazine Enterprises, a comic-book publishing company owned by Vin Sullivan. The series Funnyman lasted six issues, and a subsequent newspaper strip also was unsuccessful. It was the last collaboration of Siegel and Shuster. By this time, Shuster's vision had deteriorated to the point he could not work.

=== Marvel Comics ===
Siegel first worked for Marvel in 1963, under the pseudonym "Joe Carter". With Stan Lee, he co-created the villain Plantman (Strange Tales #113). He also scripted the "Human Torch" feature in Strange Tales #112–113 (Sept.–Oct. 1963), introducing the teenaged Torch's high school girlfriend, Doris Evans; and, under his own name, a backup feature starring the X-Men member Angel, which ran in Marvel Tales and Ka-Zar. According to then-Marvel editor-in-chief Stan Lee, Siegel "was down on his luck" and in ill health at the time, so he gave him a job at Marvel as a proofreader, during which time Siegel wrote the Angel story.

=== Archie Comics ===
Siegel worked for Archie Comics in 1966, on series including The Fly, The Mighty Crusaders, The Web, and Steel Sterling, all starring characters revived from the 1940s. Archie canceled its superhero line later that year, and Siegel was let go.

=== Fleetway Publications ===
Siegel became the main writer on The Spider a British comic book supervillain/superhero that appeared in anthology book Lion between 26 June 1965 and 26 April 1969 and was reprinted in Vulcan. Siegel took over the writing of the character with his third adventure, and would write the bulk of his adventures. His first work on the character was published in the 8 January 1966 issue, the start of the serial "The Spider v Doctor Mysterioso". He also created and wrote Gadgetman and Gimmick-Kid.

=== Military magazines ===
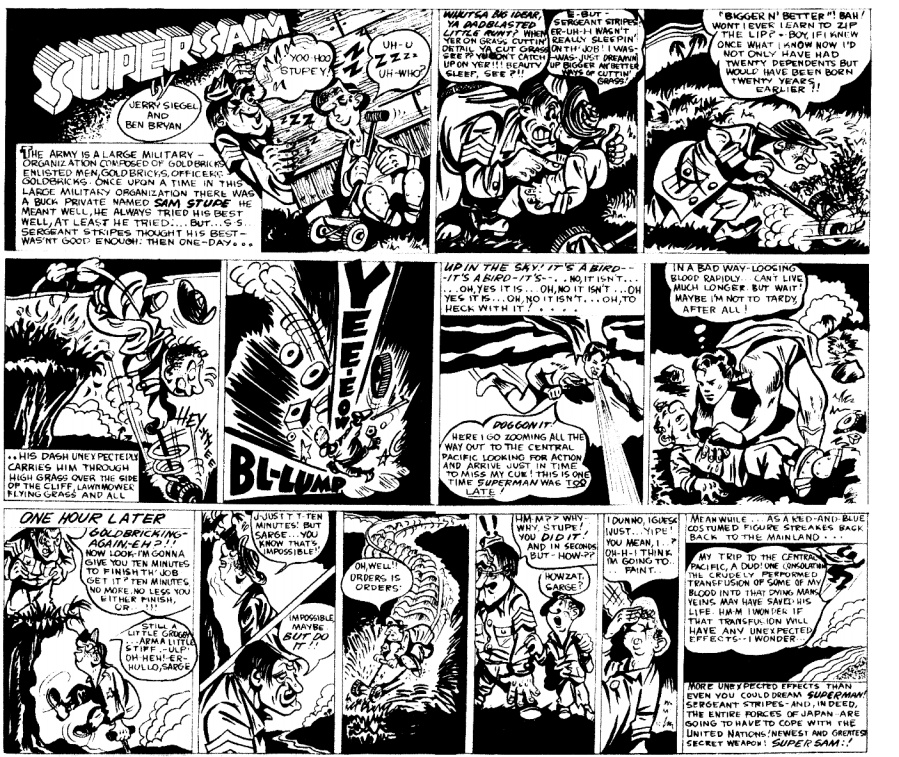
First strip of Super Sam, featuring an unauthorized appearance of Superman.

When Siegel served in the Army (1943–1946), he was posted in Honolulu, Hawaii and wrote for Stars and Stripes, Midpacifican, and Yank, the Army Weekly, all military publications written by soldiers. In Stars and Stripes, he had a small humor column titled "Take a Break wit T/5 Jerry Siegel". In Midpacifican, he wrote the comic strip Super Sam, in which an Army private gains superpowers after receiving a blood transfusion from Superman. This was not authorized by DC Comics.

=== Miscellaneous ===
In 1956, Siegel created two superheroes for Charlton Comics: Mr. Muscles and Nature Boy. The series Mr. Muscles ran two issues, and Nature Boy three.

In 1968, he worked for Western Publishing, for which he wrote (along with Carl Barks) stories in the Junior Woodchucks comic book.

He subsequently worked for the Italian comic Topolino published by Mondadori Editore (the Italian Disney comics licensee) from 1972 to 1979. He was listed in the mastheads of the period as a scriptwriter ("soggettista e sceneggiatore").

In the 1980s, he worked with Val Mayerik on the feature "The Starling", which appeared in the comic book Destroyer Duck. A projected series, The Starling, about a woman struggling to raise her half-alien, shapeshifting son after his deadbeat alien father abandoned them, went unfinished due to Siegel's death in 1996. Also in the 1980s, Siegel wrote for the comics publisher Aardvark-Vanaheim.

== Personal life ==
Siegel remained somewhat active in science fiction fandom after starting work for DC. He attended Chicon, the 1940 2nd World Science Fiction Convention, and appeared in the convention's masquerade as Clark Kent.

Siegel married Bella Lifshitz on June 10, 1939. She was a Jewish woman from his neighborhood of Glenville. With Bella, he had a son named Michael (January 27, 1944 – January 17, 2006). The couple divorced in 1948.

In November 1948, Siegel married Joanne Carter. She and Siegel first met in January 1935, when she worked with his colleague Joe Shuster as the model for Lois Lane. They reacquainted at a costume ball in New York on April 1, 1948. On March 1, 1951, Joanne gave birth to their daughter, Laura. The couple settled on Long Island, before moving to California in 1968. Siegel and Joanne remained married until his death in 1996.

== Death ==
Siegel died on January 28, 1996, of a heart attack. He had been suffering from cardiac disease for years, and had a bypass operation.

== Awards and honors ==
- Inkpot Award, 1975
- Will Eisner Comic Book Hall of Fame, 1992
- Jack Kirby Hall of Fame, 1993
- The Bill Finger Award For Excellence in Comic Book Writing, 2005 (posthumous)
- Kimberly Avenue in Cleveland was renamed "Jerry Siegel Lane" in 2009

== See also ==
- Boys of Steel, a picture book biography of Siegel and Shuster by Marc Tyler Nobleman and Ross MacDonald
- Copyright lawsuits by Superman's creators
