= Courtney Whitmore =

DC Comics superhero

- Stargirl as she appeared on a promotional image of Stargirl Spring Break Special #1 (May 2021). Art by Todd Nauck.

Publication information
- Publisher: DC Comics
- First appearance: Stars and S.T.R.I.P.E. #0 (July 1999); As Stargirl: JSA: All Stars #4 (October 2003)
- Created by: Geoff Johns (writer); Lee Moder (artist)

In-story information
- Alter ego: Courtney Elizabeth Whitmore
- Place of origin: Los Angeles, California
- Team affiliations: Justice Society of America; Stars and S.T.R.I.P.E. Suicide Squad; Young Justice; Justice League; Justice League United
- Partnerships: Pat Dugan; Jakeem Thunder; Shazam (Billy Batson)
- Notable aliases: Star-Spangled Kid
- Abilities: Expert gymnast and kick-boxer; Via Cosmic Converter Belt: Enhanced Physical Condition; Enhanced strength, speed, reflexes, durability, agility and stamina; Projection of sparkly shooting stars to dazzle and disorient her victims; Via Cosmic Staff: Flight by standing or sitting on it; Cosmic energy projection and manipulation; Stellar energy generation and control; Deflection of energy and plasma-based attacks

Courtney Elizabeth Whitmore is a superhero appearing in American comic books published by DC Comics. Debuting in Stars and S.T.R.I.P.E. #0 (1999), the character was created by Geoff Johns and Lee Moder. The character's name, appearance, and personality were patterned after Johns' sister Courtney, who died in the explosion of TWA Flight 800 in 1996.

A ordinary teenager who grew up in Los Angeles but moved to Blue Valley after her mother marries her new husband, Patrick "Pat" Dugan, she is surprised to find her seemingly unimpressive step-father was a former sidekick. Soon, she adopted the mantle of Pat's former partner, as the second Star-Spangeled Kid and the pair become a famous superhero duo in the American Midwest, with Courtney known for her youthful optimism. She is later given the codename Stargirl, becoming a successor to Starman and is gifted his cosmic staff. The character prominently serves as a member of the Justice Society of America alongside other teams such as the Justice League and its other iterations.

Stargirl has appeared in Justice League Unlimited, Batman: The Brave and the Bold, Justice League Action, and Young Justice. She has also appeared in live-action shows Smallville played by Britt Irvin, Legends of Tomorrow played by Sarah Grey, and in her own television series played by Brec Bassinger. Bassinger reprised the role for an cameo appearance in the fourth season of the HBO Max series Titans.

== Publication history ==
The character was created by writer Geoff Johns and artist Lee Moder. She made her first appearance in Stars and S.T.R.I.P.E. #0 (July 1999).

== Fictional character biography ==
=== Stars and S.T.R.I.P.E. ===
Courtney Whitmore as the Star-Spangled Kid, prior to receiving the Knight family's Cosmic Staff from Jack Knight and becoming Stargirl. Art from Stars and S.T.R.I.P.E. #1 (August 1999) by the character's co-creator Lee Moder.

Courtney Elizabeth Whitmore was born in Los Angeles, California to Barbara Whitmore and Samuel Kurtis. When Courtney was five years old, her parents filed for divorce, leading to Barbara taking full custody of Courtney. Ten years later, Barbara married Pat Dugan, who'd than moved the family to Blue Valley, Nebraska, former hometown of Kid Flash (Wally West).

At first, Courtney loathed Pat, and wanted to see his biological father over her new stepfather. She also didn't have a good first day at the town's high school, as she was immediately sent to the principal's office for kicking a bully's face, which was in defense of her new friend, Mary Kramer. Later after school, she finds the original Star-Spangled Kid's gear in her stepfather's belongings. She dons the costume to annoy Dugan. Dugan, a skilled mechanic, designs and builds S.T.R.I.P.E., a robotic suit that he uses to accompany and protect her.

During her time in Blue Valley, her frequent nemesis is the young villainess cyborg known as Shiv, daughter of the cruel Dragon King as well as Courtney's school rival, Cindy Burman. Their most recent rematch was in Infinite Crisis, on a page added to the hardcover edition.

=== Stargirl ===
Courtney joins the Justice Society of America. After being given Starman Jack Knight's cosmic staff, she changes her identity to Stargirl, a name initially suggested by Mary. Courtney appears in most issues of JSA and it is in these pages that her half-sister Patricia Dugan is born.

Later, she confronts her predecessor's killer, Solomon Grundy. Driven further into madness by the Joker's chemical assault, Grundy attacks the JSA headquarters with the head of the Statue of Liberty. With the aid of Jakeem Thunder, Courtney fights Grundy in the streets and into the sewers below. The young heroes barely defeat Grundy and Johnny Thunderbolt repairs the Statue. Grundy later develops an obsession with Courtney.

Courtney encounters Merry Pemberton, the sister of the original Star-Spangled Kid, during the "Sins of Youth" storyline. Merry's concerns about her brother's legacy and about young superheroes battling adults causes friction with Courtney. They resolve their differences during a battle against the forces of Klarion the Witch Boy. Courtney later saves Merry's life during an attack by Amazo. During this incident, Courtney is magically aged to an adult by Klarion.

Later, she discovers her biological father working as a common thug for an incarnation of the Royal Flush Gang. They later confront each other during one of the Flush Gang's robberies.

In Stars and S.T.R.I.P.E. and an issue of Impulse, Courtney hints at having a crush on Robin (Tim Drake), a concept that was not developed in subsequent issues.

Courtney, as Stargirl, and Billy Batson (a.k.a Captain Marvel) in JSA (1999) #48. Art by Leonard Kirk.

Courtney briefly dates fellow JSA member Captain Marvel, who, in his secret identity of Billy Batson, is the same age as she, although she was attracted to Billy in his older form in the first place, without knowing his secret identity, and even kissed him. To outsiders, however, Captain Marvel is by all appearances a fully grown up adult, and the relationship between Marvel and Stargirl draws criticism from Jakeem Thunder and Jay Garrick. After Garrick confronts them, Marvel decides to leave the JSA and Courtney, instead of revealing his secret to the team. Marvel later returns to the JSA and explains that the Wisdom of Solomon prevents him from revealing his secret identity.

A glimpse into the future shows an adult "Starwoman" married to Albert Rothstein, the JSA member known as Atom Smasher.

==== JSA/JSA and Black Vengeance ====
Starman and Stargirl on the cover of JSA: All Stars #4 (October 2003). Art by John Cassaday.

Courtney's family is murdered by agents of Per Degaton and she travels with the rest of the JSA to 1951. The Modern Age successors to Golden Age JSA members meet and fight alongside the originals to save her family and the future. She finds herself forced to work with Atom Smasher again, for the first time since he defected to Black Adam's rival team. During her trip to the past, Courtney is briefly stuck in an asylum when she tries to recruit Ted Knight. Knight had become clinically depressed for his perceived role in the creation of the atomic bomb to the point that he initially thought Courtney was a hallucination, but she was saved by a figure later identified as Starwoman, an adult version of her infant sister Patricia. After the crisis is over, Courtney forgives Al for his past alliance with Black Adam but Atom Smasher is nearly killed by the Spectre during an attack on Kahndaq. He survives, but the event reveals the depth of Courtney's feelings for him. She returns to her own time to find her family alive again.

Later, Atom Smasher is tried and convicted for his actions while working for Black Adam. During a TV appearance, Courtney says that with Al in prison, she would "be there for him... no matter how long it takes."

==== Infinite Crisis ====
Stargirl and S.T.R.I.P.E. on the cover of JSA #81 (March 2006). Art by Alex Ross.

Courtney is approached by the Shade, who tells her that her biological father is dead. This tragedy and her experience of the relationship between Liberty Belle and Jesse Quick prompts her to re-evaluate her family life. She discovers that she cannot hate her biological father for his failings as a father and as a man. She also learns to accept Pat Dugan as her only real father figure.

Stargirl becomes part of a coalition consisting of the JSA, the Doom Patrol and the Teen Titans to stop Superboy-Prime from destroying Smallville. During the battle, Superboy-Prime kills Titans members Pantha, Bushido, and Baby Wildebeest. Stargirl later attends a memorial service for heroes who died in the Crisis.

Afterwards, she begins attending college. She has altered her equipment: her rod now telescopes into a small cylinder, and her costume and belt materialize as the rod extends to full size.

=== "One Year Later" ===
Courtney joins the new roster of the Justice Society and fights without S.T.R.I.P.E.'s assistance.

A seasoned hero despite her age, Courtney bonds with her young teammate Cyclone, the granddaughter of the first Red Tornado. They two bond after witnessing the death of Mister America and Courtney suggests Cyclone create a new superhero costume and name. Stargirl resumes her role of mentorship for the youngest heroes by helping Jefferson Pierce's daughter, Jennifer, cope with her powers and her isolation.

A future version of Courtney is seen in Teen Titans (vol. 3) #53 along with Lex Luthor and his future Titans. Her role is minimal, however, she is seen wearing Jack Knight's goggles and jacket—the closest she has ever come to Jack's vision of "Starwoman" at the end of his series.

In the Final Crisis miniseries, Courtney joins with other heroes to form an underground resistance against Darkseid.

Courtney is present (and apparently involved in voting) for discussions on how to move the JSA forward after the Gog debacle (and whom to retain or remove from the team) and she defends some of the heroes who sided with Gog. Later she is present when the JSA meet a depowered Billy Batson, who reveals his secret identity to the others.

After the battle with Black Adam and Isis, Courtney was unhappy, as the events had happened on her birthday (and had ruined any planned celebrations). When she goes home and opens the door, the entire Justice Society is present and have prepared a late surprise party for her. Later she is unhappy to learn she still needed her braces despite being acknowledged as one of the senior members of the JSA. It has been established that both she and Atom Smasher love each other in direct quotes rather than asides and implied habits, but the elder JSA members' comments about their age difference forced Al to turn Courtney down, stating he loved her "like a sister".

Following a massive supervillain attack, the JSA is split in two. Power Girl convinces Courtney to join the JSA All-Stars splinter group. She later expresses a deep feeling of regret over siding with the All-Stars, claiming that she feels more at home with the original roster. Karen talks her through these doubts, telling her that she needed Courtney on the team because all the other teen members of the JSA look up to her.

=== The New 52 ===
In September 2011, The New 52 rebooted DC's continuity. In this new timeline, Stargirl appears as part of a new Justice League of America title.

Born in Los Angeles, Courtney Whitmore was cleaning out the office of Barbara Whitmore's boyfriend Pat Dugan when she found a staff, a belt, and a shirt with a star on it. While trying them on, she became Stargirl and caught the perpetrator of a fire she spotted. The heroic actions went viral. After talking to her friend about what happens next, Courtney was informed by Pat that the person who originally wielded the equipment has died. Though Pat agreed to train her, Courtney had to respond to the criminal activity caused by Shadow Thief who was taking hostages to draw out a superhero. She managed to rout out Shadow Thief. When Stargirl returned home, she found that Shadow Thief arrived first, killed her brother, and wounded Barbara and Ted. Stargirl used this trauma to become a better superhero.

Amanda Waller chooses Stargirl as the public face of the JLA's public relations campaign. After the JLA disbands in Forever Evil, she joins Justice League United.

=== DC Rebirth ===
In The New Golden Age, Stargirl helps rescue thirteen missing sidekicks known as the Lost Children, who the Time Masters kidnapped in an attempt to rescue them from Doctor Manhattan's alterations to the timeline. After discovering that the children cannot be returned to their own times or risk causing a time paradox, Courtney helps them find homes in the present day.

== Powers and abilities ==
While possessing no inherent superpowers, Courtney Whitmore is enhanced by Cosmic Converter Belt, a invention created by the first Star-Spangled Kid that grants her enhanced agility, durability, speed, stamina, and strength, and the ability to create a powerful force field. When later gifted Jack Knight's Cosmic Staff, it granted her flight and energy projection. Due to her accumulated experiences, the character is also a martial artist with extensive combative training and a able gymnast.

== Supporting characters ==
Besides her stepfather Pat Dugan, the following are supporting characters of Stargirl:

- Barbara Whitmore - The mother of Courtney and the wife of Pat Dugan.
- Josh Hamman - A star athlete at Blue Valley High School who had a brief relationship with Courtney.
- Mary Kramer - A student at Blue Valley High School and a close friend of Courtney.
- Mike Dugan - The son of Pat Dugan who became Courtney's stepbrother and Barbara's stepson.
- Travis Thomas - The biggest bully at Blue Valley High School who has a crush on Mary.

== Enemies ==
With her stepfather as S.T.R.I.P.E., Stargirl had her own set of enemies that she fought in the comics:

- British Bat - Douglas Hutton is a small-time supervillain. He managed to break Starman's leg before he was defeated by Stargirl, S.T.R.I.P.E., and the Justice Society of America.
- Dragon King - An immortal villain and war criminal who experimented on himself and has the appearance of a reptilian humanoid.
- Dr. Graft - A scientist who works for Dragon King.
- Icicle - A cryokinetic supervillain.
- Johnny Sorrow - A silent movie actor who wears a mask because his face can kill anyone that looks at it.
- Laroonians - A race of aliens that invade Blue Valley.
- Nebula Man - A sentient universe.
- Paintball - Paul Deisinger is an art teacher who became a paint-themed criminal and minion of Dragon King.
- Principal Sherman - The principal of Blue Valley High School who works for Dragon King and is actually a robot.
- Sam Kurtis - Courtney's father, who works as the Two of Clubs in the Royal Flush Gang.
- Shadow Thief - A female supervillain who can turn into a shadow through her Colavarian Infiltration Suit.
- Shiv - The daughter of Dragon King with cybernetic enhancements and expert gymnastic abilities.
- Skeeter - An insectoid minion of Dragon King.
- Solomon Grundy - A powerful zombie who later developed an obsession with her.
- Stunt - A minion of Dragon King.

== Other versions ==
An adult alternate universe version of Courtney Whitmore from Earth-7 appears in Countdown: Arena.

== In other media ==
=== Television ===
==== Live-action ====
- Courtney Whitmore as Stargirl appears in Smallville, portrayed by Britt Irvin. This version is a member of the Justice Society of America and was mentored by Sylvester Pemberton.
- Courtney Whitmore as Stargirl appears in the second season of Legends of Tomorrow, portrayed by Sarah Grey. This version is a member of the Justice Society of America (JSA) who operated in the 1940s before they dispersed themselves across the timeline to protect fragments of the Spear of Destiny, with Stargirl escaping to the sixth century and creating the court of Camelot under the alias of Merlin.
- Courtney Whitmore as Stargirl appears in a self-titled TV series, portrayed by Brec Bassinger as a teenager and Maizie Smith as a child. This version is a founding member and the leader of a new incarnation of the Justice Society of America following the original group's deaths.
  - Ahead of the series' premiere, Stargirl made a cameo appearance in the Arrowverse crossover "Crisis on Infinite Earths" via footage from the Stargirl episode "The Justice Society".
  - Stargirl makes a cameo appearance in the Titans episode "Dude, Where's My Gar?".

==== Animation ====
- Courtney Whitmore as Stargirl appears in Justice League Unlimited, voiced by Giselle Loren. This version is a member of the Justice League.
- Courtney Whitmore as Stargirl appears in the teaser segment of the Batman: The Brave and the Bold episode "Cry Freedom Fighters!", voiced by Hope Levy.
- Courtney Whitmore as Stargirl makes a cameo appearance in the Robot Chicken DC Comics Special as a member of the Justice League.
- Courtney Whitmore as Stargirl appears in Justice League Action, voiced by Natalie Lander. This version is a member of the Justice League.
- Courtney Whitmore as Stargirl appears in Young Justice, voiced by Whitney Moore. This version is a member of the Outsiders and the host of the news series Stargirl.

=== Film ===
Courtney Whitmore as Stargirl was originally going to appear in Black Adam as a member of the Justice Society of America, but was cut from the film.

=== Video games ===
- Courtney Whitmore as Stargirl appears as a character summon in Scribblenauts Unmasked: A DC Comics Adventure.
- Courtney Whitmore as Stargirl appears as a playable character in Lego Batman 3: Beyond Gotham, voiced by Tara Strong.
- Courtney Whitmore as Stargirl appears as a playable character in Infinite Crisis, voiced again by Natalie Lander.
