= Pat Dugan =

DC Comics character

S.T.R.I.P.E.
- Pat Dugan as Stripesy, as depicted in Who's Who: The Definitive Directory of the DC Universe #22 (December 1986). Art by George Tuska (pencils) and Josef Rubinstein (inks).

Publication information
- Publisher: DC Comics
- First appearance: Star Spangled Comics #1 (October 1941)
- Created by: Jerry Siegel; Hal Sherman

In-story information
- Alter ego: Patrick "Pat" Dugan
- Team affiliations: Justice Society of America; Stars and S.T.R.I.P.E. Infinity Inc. Seven Soldiers of Victory; All-Star Squadron; Justice League
- Partnerships: Courtney Whitmore; Sylvester Pemberton
- Notable aliases: Stripesy
- Abilities: Powered armor; Brilliant designer; Superb acrobat and hand to hand combatant; Star Rocket Racer; Great strength

Patrick "Pat" Dugan is a superhero in the DC Comics Universe. The former adult sidekick to teenage superhero Sylvester Pemberton, the Star-Spangled Kid, Dugan is a gifted mechanic known for inventions such as the Star Rocket Racer. He was originally called "Stripesy" while working with the Seven Soldiers of Victory and the All-Star Squadron before building a powered suit of armor dubbed S.T.R.I.P.E. (Special Tactics Robotic Integrated Power Enhancer). Dugan as Stripesy was created by Jerry Siegel and Hal Sherman and first appeared in Star Spangled Comics #1 (October 1941).

Pat Dugan appeared on The CW series Stargirl, played by Luke Wilson.

== Fictional character biography ==
Dugan as Stripesy in Star Spangled Comics vol. 1, 1 (October 1941). Art by Hal Sherman.

Patrick "Pat" Dugan was the chauffeur of young rich-kid Sylvester Pemberton. He got involved in superheroics after aiding Pemberton against enemy spies. The two team up as embodiments of the American flag, Sylvester as the Star-Spangled Kid and Pat as Stripesy, to track down and stop the spies.

When the Soldiers are lost in time during the late forties after battling Nebula Man, they are rescued by the Justice League of America and returned to the present day. Batman, Hourman, and Starman retrieve Stripesy from ancient Egypt. Upon his return, Dugan marries a woman named Maggie, who leaves him later to raise their son Michael on her own. Compounding his problems is the fact that Sylvester Pemberton's black sheep relative Arthur had stolen Dugan's patents during their disappearance. Upon hearing about this, Sylvester returns the patents to Pat, and the two reconcile. Dugan is later involved with Infinity, Inc. and their battle against the Injustice Society. The group's first victim is Sylvester Pemberton. The villains Harlequin, Dummy, and Hazard focus their attention on Dugan just days later. Their plan is to kill him at Stellar Studios, the headquarters of Infinity, Inc. When Pat's son becomes involved, Hazard experiences a change of heart and uses her powers to save their lives. Dummy uses the two as bait, but Hazard throws the battle, and the group is defeated. Hazard willingly gives herself up to the police.

Dugan and his new powered-exosuit, which he uses as the armored superhero the S.T.R.I.P.E. Art by Lee Moder (penciller), Dan Davis (inker), and Tom McCraw (colorist).

S.T.R.I.P.E. with Stargirl, on the cover for JSA #81. Art by Alex Ross.

The character has been updated for a new audience: In the Stars and S.T.R.I.P.E. series Dugan had gotten married (for the second time) and settled in Blue Valley. His stepdaughter, Courtney Whitmore, became the second Star-Spangled Kid, partly to annoy him. This led Dugan to develop a robotic suit of power armor and assume the identity of S.T.R.I.P.E. so as to accompany and protect her.

Dugan has gone on missions without Courtney. During the Day of Judgement incident, he travels into space with Captain Marvel and Starfire. Their goal is to retrieve the Spear of Destiny to use against the fallen angel Asmodel, who is invading Earth. The trio of heroes battle reanimated corpses of abandoned Russian cosmonauts and the corrupting influence of the Spear itself. Dugan is forced to subdue Starfire and the Spear is brought back to Earth and successfully used.

Following the events of the series, Dugan and his family move to Metropolis, where he has assisted Superman's comrade Steel. Since then, they have moved back to Blue Valley. Dugan and his wife had a daughter, Patricia, who will one day become Starwoman and continue the Starman legacy. Patricia's existence was mentioned off-handedly in a Starman story arc prior to Courtney Whitmore's debut.

Like the rest of the Seven Soldiers, Dugan is younger than he should be, owing to time travel. For a time, Dugan would become even younger, aged to pre-adolescence with many other heroes due to Klarion the Witch Boy. He joins in on at least one battle while armorless (presumably because his armor is now too big), tackling a mystically created monster with his bare hands. Pat, along with most everyone affected, turns back to normal when Klarion is blackmailed into reversing the effects.

Pat worked with the Justice Society of America for a short time, mostly in a supporting role. He retooled one of Ted Knight's old designs and created the Steel Eagle, a new aircraft for the team. He also completely re-engineered S.T.R.I.P.E., changing its entire appearance.

Pat and his family are nearly killed by the Fourth Reich, a Nazi organization who tried to wipe out heroic legacies. Right before this, Pat was encouraging his son, Mike, not to create S.T.R.I.P.E. parts in shop class. Pat and his family were saved by the Justice Society. Later, Pat hosted Courtney's birthday party at his house, inviting the whole Justice Society.

In September 2011, The New 52 rebooted DC's continuity. Pat Dugan is the boyfriend of Barbara Whitmore. Courtney was cleaning out the office of Barbara Whitmore's boyfriend Pat Dugan when she found a staff, a belt, and a shirt with a star on it. While trying them on, she became Stargirl and caught the perpetrator of a fire she spotted. The heroic actions went viral. Courtney was informed by Pat that the person who originally wielded the equipment has died. Though Pat agreed to train her, Courtney had to respond to the criminal activity caused by Shadow Thief who was taking hostages to draw out a superhero.

In the "Watchmen" sequel "Doomsday Clock", S.T.R.I.P.E. returns alongside many other superheroes to the DC Universe when Doctor Manhattan, inspired by Superman, undoes the changes that he made to the timeline that erased the Justice Society and the Legion of Super-Heroes.

== Powers and abilities ==
Pat Dugan has no superpowers, but is a gifted mechanic, having built Sylvester Pemberton's Star-Rocket Racer, the JSA's Steel Eagle. Being a superb hand-to-hand combatant he can take on anyone, even enemies bigger than him. Thanks to his power armor he can fly and has great physical strength and stamina.

=== Equipment ===
Pat also operated an armor suit named "S.T.R.I.P.E." equipped with a range of ballistic weapons and utilities, and that also gave him enhanced strength and flight ability. Its circuitry was vulnerable to water.

== Other versions ==
In Kingdom Come, Alex Ross portrays Stripesy as a black adult, renamed "Stripes", and is equipped with various military accoutrements such as automatic weaponry, knives, and kevlar padding.

== In other media ==
=== Television ===
- Pat Dugan as S.T.R.I.P.E. appears in Justice League Unlimited, voiced by an uncredited Phil LaMarr. This version is a member of the Justice League.
- Pat Dugan appears in Stargirl, portrayed by Luke Wilson. This version is largely based on his appearance in the Stars and S.T.R.I.P.E. comic, being a former member of the Seven Soldiers of Victory and Justice Society of America (JSA) as well as the sidekick of Sylvester Pemberton / Starman. When his stepdaughter Courtney Whitmore decides to become Stargirl, Dugan assists her in a mechanized battle suit he built years earlier, but never used until then. Despite his reluctance to become a superhero again, Courtney anoints him as her partner and changes his original codename, "Stripesy", to S.T.R.I.P.E. based on an acronym she coined for his armor. When the family moves to Blue Valley, he opens and runs a garage called the Pit Stop. Initially disliked by Courtney owing to her hoping that her birth father Sam Kurtis would return to her life, Dugan eventually wins her over after she learns of his past, devotion to his family, and brilliance in mechanical engineering; becoming a surrogate father figure and reluctant mentor to her and later her iteration of the JSA. While S.T.R.I.P.E. is primarily portrayed by CGI, Legacy Effects created a practical S.T.R.I.P.E. to be used during filming.
  - Ahead of the series premiere, S.T.R.I.P.E. appeared in the Arrowverse crossover Crisis on Infinite Earths via archive footage from the Stargirl episode "The Justice Society".

=== Film ===
An alternate universe incarnation of Pat Dugan appears in Justice League: Gods and Monsters, voiced by Dan Gilvezan. This version is a scientist and member of Lex Luthor's "Project Fair Play", a contingency program meant to destroy their universe's Justice League if necessary. After three of their number are killed, Dugan and the remaining scientists attempt to regroup, but are killed by the Metal Men.

=== Miscellaneous ===
Pat Dugan as S.T.R.I.P.E. appears in the Justice League Unlimited tie-in comic book.
