= Hal Sherman =

Cartoonist and comic book artist (1911–2009)

Hal Sherman (born Harold Sicherman; March 31, 1911 – January 25, 2009) was a gag cartoonist and a Platinum Age and Golden Age comic-book artist.

He is noted for his work on the Star-Spangled Kid superhero, which he co-created with Jerry Siegel, who had previously co-created the Superman superhero.

== Gag cartooning ==
Sherman drew gag cartoons for magazines, including College Laughs. During the 1950s, he created cartoons for cocktail napkins published by Monogram of California. His napkin sets include Double Feature, which was two-panel cartoons, one on the outside of the napkin, another that appeared when it was unfolded (1955); Little Friar, gags about a friar (1956); and Nudeniks, cartoons about nudists (1958).

During the 1960s, he expanded the Little Friar and the Nudeniks material each into their own full paperback of cartoons. He also drew Alley Whoops! (1962), a book of bowling cartoons, Pennant Laffs (1963), a book of punch-out humorous pennants, and Fishing for Laughs (1964), a volume of fishing cartoons.

== Awards ==
- Inkpot Award, 2002

== Personal life ==
Sherman and Ann, his wife of over sixty years, are buried together in Mount Hebron Cemetery in Flushing, New York.
