= Star-Spangled Kid =

Star-Spangled kid
- The Sylvester Pemberton incarnation of the Star-Spangled Kid as depicted in All Star Comics #64 (February 1977). Art by Wally Wood.

Publication information
- Publisher: DC Comics
- First appearance: Sylvester Pemberton: Star Spangled Comics #1 (October 1941); Courtney Whitmore: Stars and S.T.R.I.P.E. #0 (July 1999); Miss Martian: Teen Titans #37 (August 2006)

In-story information
- Notable aliases: Miss Martian; Courtney Whitmore; Sylvester Pemberton/Skyman
- Abilities: Sylvester Pemberton: Superb athlete; Hand to hand combatant; Cosmic converter belt; Courtney Whitmore: Expert gymnast and kickboxer; Enhanced strength, speed, agility and stamina; Shooting star projection; Flight; Cosmic energy manipulation; Miss Martian To view all abilities click here: Miss Martian’s abilities or White Martians

The Star-Spangled Kid is the name of several superheroes in the DC Comics' main shared universe.

== Fictional character history ==
=== Sylvester Pemberton ===
The original Star-Spangled Kid was Sylvester Pemberton, a Golden Age character, created by Superman co-creator Jerry Siegel. He adopted the identity to battle Nazism during World War II, and was unique in being a child with an adult sidekick, Stripesy a.k.a. Pat Dugan. Both he and Dugan were superb acrobats along with having sufficient training in hand-to-hand combat, but the pair regularly bickered about which of them should get top billing.

Decades later, he changed his name to Skyman and led Infinity Inc. He was later killed by Mister Bones's cyanide touch.

=== Courtney Whitmore ===
Courtney is Pat Dugan's stepdaughter, who found Pemberton's gear in his belongings and donned the Cosmic Converter Belt, with a costume of her own design. She begins her career as the second Star-Spangled Kid to annoy Dugan as partial revenge for him marrying her mother and supposedly forcing the family to move from Los Angeles to Blue Valley, Nebraska. Dugan, a skilled mechanic, designs and builds S.T.R.I.P.E., a mecha which he rides in to accompany and protect her. Eventually, she joins the JSA and, after being given Jack Knight's cosmic rod, changes her identity to Stargirl.

=== Miss Martian ===
A third Star-Spangled Kid appears in Terror Titans #1 and is subsequently captured by the Terror Titans team for the Dark Side Club. The Star-Spangled Kid is forced to fight in a tournament against other meta-humans, going on to win the tournament. During the course of the storyline he appears to have a much stronger resistance to brainwashing than the other fighters, although he does eventually succumb. Later, it is revealed that he is the shape-shifting Miss Martian, who is immune to the brainwashing and gradually frees the other combatants.

== Other versions ==
- An African-American child based on the Star-Spangled Kid, simply named Stars, appears in Kingdom Come. This version wears a leather jacket, an American flag bandana, a T-shirt with an inverted American flag, and a cosmic belt in addition to wielding the Cosmic Staff. Additionally, he is accompanied by a muscular older man called "Stripes".
- The Star-Spangled Kid appears in Tiny Titans #38.

== In other media ==
- The Sylvester Pemberton incarnation of the Star-Spangled Kid appears in the Smallville two-part episode "Absolute Justice", portrayed by Jim Shield.
- The Sylvester Pemberton incarnation of the Star-Spangled Kid appears in a photograph depicted in the Stargirl episode "Brainwave".
