= Cameron Gellman =

American actor

- Born: Cameron Roth Gellman; October 10, 1998 (age 27); Clayton, Missouri, U.S.
- Education: Clayton High School
- Occupation: Actor
- Years active: 2016–present
- Height: 1.80 m (5 ft 11 in)

Cameron Roth Gellman (born October 10, 1998) is an American actor known for his work as Rick Tyler / Hourman in the DC Universe series Stargirl.

== Early life and education ==
Gellman was born in Clayton, Missouri, and is a native of the St. Louis, Missouri area. He attended Clayton High School and graduated in 2017. As a result, he eventually relocated to the Los Angeles area in order to advance his career.

== Career ==
Gellman began his acting career in 2016 when he appeared in the drama-romance show Days of Our Lives, where he played the role of Teen #1. In the comedy series The Thundermans, where he played the guest role Good Looking Guy. Gellman made his film debut in coming-of-age comedy-drama film 20th Century Women as Mark. In 2017, Gellman played the recurring role as Liam in the series Relationship Status. In 2018, Gellman played the guest role as Max in the series The Fosters and also played the guest role as Henry in The Middle. He played Jason de la Garza in the 2018 television film Mommy Be Mine. Gellman played Bobby Beausoleil in the 2018 film Charlie Says. He played the recurring role of Kurt in the black comedy series Heathers. Gellman made a guest appearance in the crime series Solve as Alex. Gellman guest-starred on The Good Doctor as Aiden Porter. In 2020, Gellman was cast to play the lead role in the superhero series Stargirl alongside Brec Bassinger, Yvette Monreal, Anjelika Washington, Trae Romano, Jake Austin Walker and Meg DeLacy, in which he played the character Rick Tyler / Hourman II. In 2022, Gellman appeared in the drama series Animal Kingdom as Brock Fellows.

== Filmography ==
=== Film ===
Year	Title	Role	Notes
2016	20th Century Women	Mark	
2018	Mommy Be Mine	Jason de la Garza	Television film
2018	Charlie Says	Bobby Beausoleil	

=== Television ===
Year	Title	Role	Notes
2016	Days of Our Lives	Teen #1	Episode: "Episode #1.12794"
2016	The Thundermans	Good Looking Guy	Episode: "Can't Spy Me Love"
2017	Relationship Status	Liam	Recurring character / 3 episodes
2018	The Fosters	Max	Episode: "Mother's Day"
2018	The Middle	Henry	Episode: "Great Heckspectations"
2018	Heathers	Kurt	Recurring character / 7 episodes
2019	Solve	Alex	Episode: "Grindhouse"
2020	The Good Doctor	Aiden Porter	Episode: "Autopsy"
2020–2022	Stargirl	Rick Tyler / Hourman	Main cast
2022	Animal Kingdom	Brock Fellows	Episode: "Diamonds Are Forever"
2025	NCIS	Dan Holloway	Episode: Ladies’ Night
