= Jake Austin Walker =

American actor and singer-songwriter

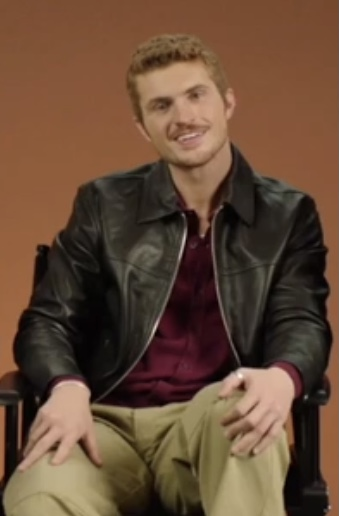
- Walker in 2022
- Born: June 24, 1997 (age 29); Hickory, Mississippi, U.S.
- Occupations: Actor, singer
- Years active: 2006–present

Jake Austin Walker (born June 24, 1997) is an American actor and singer. He is known for his roles as Jared Talbot in the Sundance series Rectify (2013–2016), Henry King Jr. in the DC Universe series Stargirl (2020–2021), and Liam Sadusky in the Disney+ series National Treasure: Edge of History.

== Life and career ==
Walker was born in Hickory, Mississippi. He is also a pop musician. Walker began his acting career in 2006 as a child actor when he appeared on the late-night talk show Talkshow with Spike Feresten. The same year, he worked in two series: 'Til Death as Classroom Kid and Bones as Matty. In the 2008 short film Miss Dirt, he played the character of Miss Dirt's Bully. In the 2008 docudrama film, Front of the Class, where he played the antagonist role of Young Brad's Bully.

In 2009, Walker made his film debut in the black comedy film I Love You Phillip Morris starring Jim Carrey and Ewan McGregor. He played the role of Tim at the age of 10 in the action miniseries Impact. In the 2009 short film The Macabre World of Lavender Williams, he played the antagonist role of Lavender William's bully. He played the uncredited role as Older Orphan Boy in the coming-of-age film Alabama Moon. In 2010, Walker played the character of J.J. in the sci-fi horror film House of Bones. He played the role of Trevor in the satirical thriller film Burning Palms and also played the role of Dennis in the comedy film Knucklehead.

In 2011, Walker plays Ted in the crime comedy film The Chaperone and in the 2012 horror film No One Lives as Older boy. In 2013, Walker played the recurring and main role of Jared Talbot in the drama series Rectify. In the 2015 short film TheCavKid, he played the role of Zack. In 2016, Walker appeared in the horror drama series Fear the Walking Dead as Seth Geary.

In 2018, Walker played the guest role as Sam Stoller in the action drama series Lethal Weapon. He was cast to play the main role in the teen drama web series Five Points alongside Hayley Kiyoko and Madison Pettis, in which he played the character as Alex Baker.

In 2020, Walker appeared on the first season of the DC Universe and The CW series Stargirl alongside Brec Bassinger, Yvette Monreal, Anjelika Washington, Cameron Gellman, Trae Romano and Meg DeLacy, in which he played the character of Henry King Jr./Brainwave. He played Jeremy in the comedy/drama film Butter starring Alex Kersting, McKaley Miller, Adain Bradley and Jack Griffo, which was released in March 7, 2020 and also was released on VOD and select theaters by Blue Fox Entertainment on February 25, 2022.

In 2021, Walker was cast to play the role in the sports film 12 Mighty Orphans, in which he played Hardy Brown. He played one of the guest roles as Kyle Richter in the legal/crime drama series Truth Be Told.

In 2022, Walker was cast to play the main role in the action-adventure series National Treasure: Edge of History alongside Lisette Olivera, Zuri Reed, Antonio Cipriano and Jordan Rodrigues, he played the role of Liam Sadusky. He played the role of Eric Olsen in the comedy drama series Tiny Beautiful Things.

== Filmography ==
=== Film ===
Year	Title	Role	Notes
2008	Miss Dirt	Miss Dirt's Bully	Short film
2009	I Love You Phillip Morris	Church Boy	Uncredited role
2009	The Macabre World of Lavender Williams	Lavender William's bully	Short film
2009	Alabama Moon	Older Orphan Boy	Uncredited role
2010	Burning Palms	Trevor	
2010	Knucklehead	Dennis	
2011	The Chaperone	Ted	
2012	No One Lives	Older boy	
2015	TheCavKid	Zack	Short film
2020	Butter	Jeremy	
2021	12 Mighty Orphans	Hardy Brown	

=== Television ===
Year	Title	Role	Notes
2006	Talkshow with Spike Feresten	Co-Star	Episode: "Fred Willard"
2007	'Til Death	Classroom Kid	Episode: "I Heart Woodcocks"
2007	Bones	Matty	Episode: "Mummy in the Maze"
2008	Front of the Class	Young Brad's Bully	TV movie
2009	Impact	Tim - 10 Years Old	Episode 2
2010	House of Bones	J.J.	TV movie
2013-2016	Rectify	Jared Talbot	Recurring role (season 1); Main role (seasons 2–4)
2016	Fear the Walking Dead	Seth Geary	Episode: "We All Fall Down"
2018	Lethal Weapon	Sam Stoller	Episode: "Frankie Comes to Hollywood"
2018	Five Points	Alex Baker	Main role (season 1)
2020-2021	Stargirl	Henry King Jr.	Main role (season 1); Guest role (season 2)
2021	Truth Be Told	Kyle Richter	Episode: "Brick by Brick It Also Falls"
2022-2023	National Treasure: Edge of History	Liam Sadusky	
2023	Tiny Beautiful Things	Eric Olsen	Episode: "The Nose"
2026	High Potential	Officer Hoff	Episode: "If You Come For The Queen"

== Discography ==
=== EPs ===
List of extended plays
Title	Details
Lost Nights	Released: September 18, 2020; Label: Santa Monica Recordings; Format: Digital download, streaming
Thinking Backwards	Released: June 7, 2024; Label: Independent; Format: Digital download, streaming

=== Singles ===
Title	Year	Album
"I'm Ready"	2017	Non-album singles
"Rolling Stones"	2018	Non-album singles
"Last Dance"	2018	Non-album singles
"Fuck Love"	2018	Non-album singles
"Need You Now"	2018	Non-album singles
"Company"	2019	Non-album singles
"Over You"	2020	Non-album singles
"Not Ok"	2020	Lost Nights
"Magnolia"	2020	Non-album singles
"The Best Thing"	2023	Non-album singles
"Changed Man"	2024	Thinking Backwards
"Lullaby"	2024	Thinking Backwards
"Suffer"	2024	Thinking Backwards

=== Other appearances ===
Title	Year	Other artists	Album
"Be Brave"	2023	—N/a	National Treasure: Edge of History (Original Motion Picture Soundtrack)
"Hey Dreamer"	2023	—N/a	National Treasure: Edge of History (Original Motion Picture Soundtrack)
"Suspicious Minds"	2023	—N/a	National Treasure: Edge of History (Original Motion Picture Soundtrack)
"I Miss That Van"	2023	—N/a	National Treasure: Edge of History (Original Motion Picture Soundtrack)
"Shame on Me"	2023	—N/a	National Treasure: Edge of History (Original Motion Picture Soundtrack)
"Beside Me, Besides You	2023	—N/a	National Treasure: Edge of History (Original Motion Picture Soundtrack)
