= Shattered Memories =

Shattered Memories may refer to:

- Silent Hill: Shattered Memories, a 2009 survival horror video game
- Shattered Memories (film), a 2018 American thriller film
