= Stargirl (TV series) =

2020 American superhero television series

- Season one logo
- Also known as: Stargirl: Summer School (season 2); Stargirl: Frenemies (season 3)
- Genre: Action; Drama; Superhero
- Created by: Geoff Johns
- Based on: Courtney Whitmore by: Geoff Johns; Lee Moder
- Showrunner: Geoff Johns
- Starring: Brec Bassinger; Yvette Monreal; Anjelika Washington; Cameron Gellman; Trae Romano; Jake Austin Walker; Meg DeLacy; Neil Jackson; Christopher James Baker; Amy Smart; Luke Wilson; Hunter Sansone; Nick Tarabay; Alkoya Brunson; Neil Hopkins; Joy Osmanski; Joel McHale
- Music by: Pinar Toprak
- Country of origin: United States
- Original language: English
- No. of seasons: 3
- No. of episodes: 39

Production
- Executive producers: Sarah Schechter; Glen Winter; Greg Beeman; Melissa Carter; Greg Berlanti; Geoff Johns
- Producers: Jennifer Lence; James Dale Robinson; Trish Stanard; Rob Hardy; Joseph Zolfo; Trina Renee; Carl Ogawa; Taylor Streitz; Andi Armaganian
- Production location: Atlanta, Georgia
- Cinematography: Christopher Manley; Scott Peck; Michael Karasick; Stefan Czapsky; Joshua Stern; Evans Brown; Learan Kahanov; Jon Delgado; Saade Mustafa
- Editors: Andi Armaganian; Daniel Downer III; Mats Abbott; Avi Youabian; Natalie A. Boschan; Joshua Carrillo; Matthew Wingard; Jessica L. Stone; Marc Pattavina; Brandon Hwang; Tom Runquist
- Running time: 38–53 minutes
- Production companies: Berlanti Productions; Mad Ghost Productions; DC Entertainment; Warner Bros. Television

Original release
- Network: DC Universe
- Release: May 18 – August 10, 2020
- Network: The CW
- Release: August 10, 2021 – December 7, 2022

DC's Stargirl, or simply Stargirl, is an American superhero television series created by Geoff Johns that premiered on streaming service DC Universe. It is based on the DC Comics superhero Courtney Whitmore, created by Johns and Lee Moder. The series follows high school student Courtney Whitmore who discovers the cosmic staff originally wielded by Starman and becomes the inspiration for a new generation of superheroes who become the new incarnation of the Justice Society of America.

DC Universe ordered the series in July 2018. Brec Bassinger was cast as Courtney Whitmore that September, with additional castings for her family members, the Justice Society of America, and the Injustice Society of America through February 2019. Filming for the series began in March 2019 in the Atlanta metropolitan area. Stargirl premiered on DC Universe on May 18, 2020; the first season consists of 13 episodes and also aired the following day on the broadcast network The CW. The second season, subtitled Summer School premiered on August 10, 2021, exclusively on The CW. The third and final season, subtitled Frenemies premiered on August 31, 2022.

Ahead of the series premiere, characters from the series were featured in a cameo during the Arrowverse crossover "Crisis on Infinite Earths" through archive footage. It established Stargirl as existing on a parallel Earth to the Arrowverse. The show has received critical acclaim.

== Premise ==
One decade after most members of the Justice Society of America (JSA) are killed in battle against the Injustice Society of America (ISA), Courtney Whitmore, a high school student who moved to Blue Valley, discovers the Cosmic Staff of Starman and learns that her stepfather Pat Dugan used to be his sidekick. After encountering the remnants of the ISA which now include the mysterious Dragon King and his daughter Cindy Burman, Courtney becomes the inspiration for a whole new generation of superheroes and recruits Yolanda Montez, Rick Tyler, and Beth Chapel.

In the second season, Stargirl and the JSA contend with the re-emergence of former ISA member Shade and a mysterious entity known as Eclipso, who works with Cindy to create a new ISA called Injustice Unlimited. When Eclipso breaks free from Cindy's control, the JSA works to stop him and finds new allies in Jennie-Lynn Scott, Jakeem Williams, Thunderbolt, a rescued Charles McNider, a revived Starman, and former ISA members Solomon Grundy, Sportsmaster, and Tigress.

In the third and final season, the heroes and villains living in Blue Valley become embroiled in a murder mystery after former ISA member Steven Sharpe is found dead, while someone has been spying on them with cameras placed all over town. It turns out that a reconstituted Icicle was responsible as he is in league with the JSA's old enemy Ultra-Humanite and a surviving Dragon King.

== Cast and characters ==
- Brec Bassinger as Courtney Whitmore / Stargirl:
  A high school student from Los Angeles who finds a powerful weapon, the Cosmic Staff, and becomes the superheroine Stargirl. As Stargirl, she also becomes the leader of the second incarnation of the Justice Society of America (JSA). In preparation for the role, Bassinger did not look at the character's previous portrayals by Britt Irvin on Smallville and Sarah Grey on Legends of Tomorrow because they were depicted as "older, more mature version[s]" of Stargirl. Bassinger added that the series follows the comic Stars and S.T.R.I.P.E. more "in that she's young, high school, naive", which she wanted to bring that into her version of Stargirl. Maizie Smith portrays a five-year old Courtney.
- Yvette Monreal as Yolanda Montez / Wildcat II:
  A once popular student at Blue Valley High until a scandal made her an outcast and a disgrace to her Catholic parents. A skilled boxer, she becomes one of Courtney's friends and a member of the new JSA as the new Wildcat.
- Anjelika Washington as Beth Chapel / Doctor Mid-Nite II: A social reject and nerd who becomes one of Courtney's friends and a member of the new JSA as the new Doctor Mid-Nite.
- Cameron Gellman as Rick Tyler / Hourman II:
  A high school delinquent with anger issues and the son of the original Hourman whose parents were killed in a staged car accident when he was seven. He becomes one of Courtney's friends and a member of the new JSA as the new Hourman. Boston Pierce portrays a 7-year-old Rick.
- Trae Romano as Mike Dugan: Pat Dugan's son and Courtney's stepbrother.
- Jake Austin Walker as Henry King Jr. (season 1; guest season 2 (Note: Eclipso uses an illusion of Henry King Jr. to torment Yolanda.)):
  A student at Blue Valley High as well as its star football player. He later develops psionic powers after experiencing emotional distress following his father becoming comatose. His deceased mother was Sylvester Pemberton's sister Merry.
- Meg DeLacy as Cindy Burman / Shiv:
  The daughter of the Dragon King, girlfriend of Henry King Jr. and the most popular student at Blue Valley High with enhanced abilities and wields wrist blades from her skin. While she is the school's cheerleading captain, she is determined to follow in her father's footsteps. In pursuit of this, she acquired a powerful suit of armor and a flame-throwing staff. In the second season, she teams up with Eclipso and forms a new ISA called Injustice Unlimited. In the third and final season, she wants to change her ways and joins the new JSA. Later, Cindy starts to manifest a reptilian form due to her father's experiments on her throughout her childhood.
- Neil Jackson as Jordan Mahkent / Icicle (season 1; recurring season 3; guest season 2 (Note: Eclipso uses an illusion of Icicle on Barbara where he claimed that the snowstorm has enabled him to be reborn. Shade helped Barbara break this illusion.)):
  The leader of the Injustice Society of America (ISA), an "astute" businessman with the power of cryokinesis and founder of a firm called The American Dream that is responsible for the revitalization of Blue Valley. Jackson initially thought "Icicle" was "a silly name" and made the character sound "like a My Little Pony", but Johns' pitch helped make the character credible for Jackson. In the third and final season, Icicle had spent the following year reconstituting himself after he was shattered by Mike Dugan. Nine months earlier, he figured out that Starman's staff had imparted cosmic energy into him that was slowly healing his body. He therefore formed an alliance with the JSA's old enemy Ultra-Humanite and the surviving Dragon King to dig up his body and revive him. His plan was to transplant the Ultra-Humanite's brain into Starman's body to be his puppet that he would use to manipulate Stargirl and her JSA and become president as a mouthpiece for Icicle to enact his policies, since Starman was a beloved hero everyone admired, and the Dragon King's brain into the Ultra-Humanite's albino gorilla body for the former to "defeat" as Starman alongside Jordan's son.
- Christopher James Baker as Henry King Sr. / Brainwave (season 1; guest season 2 (Note: Eclipso uses an illusion of Brainwave to torment Yolanda.)):
  A member of the ISA with psionic abilities, the father of Henry King Jr. and a successful neurosurgeon at Blue Valley Medical Center. Baker stated that Henry King Sr. was the "mask" of Brainwave, as opposed to the other way around, believing Brainwave "is the true being".
- Amy Smart as Barbara Whitmore: Courtney's mother and Pat Dugan's wife who strives to balance her work and home life. After her marriage to Pat, she initially serves as a surrogate mother to her stepson Mike and also to Courtney's JSA teammates after discovering Pat and Courtney's secrets.
- Luke Wilson as Pat Dugan / S.T.R.I.P.E.:
  Courtney's stepfather, the former sidekick to Starman, and a mechanic who owns a repair garage where he stores a 15-foot robotic vehicle of his own creation made from spare car parts. Pat serves as a reluctant mentor and father figure to Courtney and her JSA teammates while using a garage called The Pit Stop as a front. Despite his superheroics, Pat wants to provide a normal life for his family.
- Hunter Sansone as Cameron Mahkent: A student at Blue Valley High, aspiring artist, and the son of Jordan Mahkent who was born with cryokinetic powers like his father. He and Courtney share a mutual crush. In the third and final season, Cameron learns the Justice Society's identities and that they're responsible for his father's apparent death. Roger Dale Floyd portrays a younger Cameron.
- Nick Tarabay as Eclipso (season 2; guest season 1 (Note: Eclipso cameos in "Stars & S.T.R.I.P.E. Part Two", voiced by an uncredited actor.)): An entity trapped inside a black diamond that Cindy obtains. He plans to become a god by feeding on the negativity and darkness of the people on Earth. Milo Stein portrays Eclipso's form of young Bruce.
- Alkoya Brunson as Jakeem Williams / Jakeem Thunder (season 3; guest season 2): A gamer who is Mike Dugan's friend, the younger brother of Jenny Williams, and the current keeper of Thunderbolt's pen.
- Neil Hopkins as Lawrence "Crusher" Crock / Sportsmaster (season 3; recurring season 1; guest season 2):
  A member of the ISA who wields sports-themed weapons and believes that all of his targets are just part of a game to win. Crusher is the owner of a gym in Blue Valley called Ripped City, is married to Paula Brooks, and is the father of Artemis Crock. In the second season, he breaks out of prison twice. In the third and final season, he moves in next door to the Whitmore-Dugans.
- Joy Osmanski as Paula Brooks / Tigress (season 3; recurring season 1; guest season 2):
  A member of the ISA who hunts the world's most dangerous humans. She is a gym teacher at Blue Valley High, the wife of "Crusher" Crock, and mother of Artemis Crock. In the second season, she breaks out of prison twice. In the third and final season, she moves in next door to the Whitmore-Dugans.
- Joel McHale as Sylvester Pemberton / Starman and Gerard Shugel / Ultra-Humanite (season 3; guest season 1; recurring season 2):
  A member of the original JSA who used an anti gravity Cosmic Staff invented by scientist Ted Knight that Courtney later finds. In the present, Ultra-Humanite forms an alliance with Icicle and Dragon King before transplanting his brain into Sylvester Pemberton's body in order to manipulate Stargirl and her JSA, and Dragon King's brain into Ultra-Humanite's albino gorilla body for him to "defeat" as Starman alongside Jordan's son before intending to run for president as a mouthpiece for Icicle to spread his ideals.

== Episodes ==
Season	Episodes	Originally released		
Season	Episodes	First released	Last released	Network
1	13	May 18, 2020	August 10, 2020	DC Universe
2	13	August 10, 2021	November 2, 2021	The CW
3	13	August 31, 2022	December 7, 2022	The CW

=== Season 1 (2020) ===
No. overall	No. in season	Title	Directed by	Written by	Original release date
1	1	"Pilot"	Glen Winter	Geoff Johns	May 18, 2020
The Justice Society of America's (JSA) headquarters is attacked by the Injustice Society of America (ISA), who kill their JSA counterparts. Pat Dugan, JSA leader Starman's sidekick, arrives to find his friend dying and helps him escape. Starman tells Pat to keep his Cosmic Staff safe until he can find a worthy successor to rebuild the Justice Society. Meanwhile, a young Courtney Whitmore learns that her father Sam Kurtis could not make it home for Christmas. Ten years later, her mother, Barbara, is married to Pat as he moves his step-family to Blue Valley. After a bad first day at Blue Valley High School, Courtney accidentally stumbles upon the Cosmic Staff in her basement. It takes her to the local drive-in, where Courtney disguises herself and accidentally destroys jock Henry King Jr.'s father's car while pranking him. Returning home, Courtney is confronted by Pat, who admits his involvement with the JSA, causing Courtney to believe Starman is her real father. Henry Jr. informs his dad, Henry King Sr., about the incident, leading to Henry Sr. donning his Brainwave uniform. While training with the Cosmic Staff, Courtney is attacked by Henry Sr. before Pat saves her with a suit of armor.
2	2	"S.T.R.I.P.E."	Greg Beeman	Geoff Johns	May 25, 2020
Pat tells Courtney that JSA member Hourman survived the attack and had been secretly searching for the ISA across the country. Pat created the armor to help, but when Hourman reached Blue Valley, he and his wife were killed in a car crash. Pat came to Blue Valley two years ago to pick up the trail, during which he met Barbara. Pat advises Courtney against seeking out Brainwave, but she ignores him and creates a costume for herself from Starman's old uniform. Meanwhile, Henry Sr. finds Courtney's damaged school ID card at the site of their battle. While attending Blue Valley High's open house, Henry Sr. confronts Courtney and threatens to kill Barbara unless she brings him the Staff. Pat goes to confront Brainwave, but is easily defeated. Now calling herself Stargirl, Courtney fights Henry Sr. and, with Pat's help, short-circuits his powers, leaving him in a coma. Courtney asks Pat to become her partner, changing his codename from Stripesy to S.T.R.I.P.E. Meanwhile, Jordan Mahkent meets with associate Steven Sharpe at the ISA's headquarters under The American Dream's office and learns about Starman's successor.
3	3	"Icicle"	Michael Nankin	Colleen McGuinness	June 1, 2020
Eight years ago, Jordan swears to his dying wife that he will ensure their son's safety and to continue "Project: New America". Courtney decides that she and Pat need to find the ISA's remaining members, starting with their leader Icicle. Pat, however, insists that being a hero is far more dangerous than she understands. At school, Courtney meets aspiring magician Joey Zarick and art student Cameron Mahkent, Jordan's son. She also tries to stand up for classmate Yolanda Montez, who rebuffs her help. Meanwhile, Jordan visits fellow ISA member William Zarick and sets up a trap for Courtney, correctly guessing that she will leap at any opportunity to catch him. A school bus gets caught up in their fight, and though Pat is able to save it, he and Courtney are unable to save Joey from being hit by a truck. Enraged by his son's death, William confronts Jordan, who freezes him and covers up his death to the public. A guilt-stricken Pat takes Courtney to the old JSA headquarters and tells her to give up her identity until he says otherwise. Refusing to listen, Courtney steals the deceased JSA members' memorabilia so she can find their successors.
4	4	"Wildcat"	Rob Hardy	James Dale Robinson	June 8, 2020
Three months ago, Yolanda becomes an outcast after her rival, Cindy Burman, leaks a risqué photo she sent to Henry Jr. to the whole school. As a result, her relationship with her Catholic parents Maria and Juan Montez becomes sour. Using their mutual contempt for Henry Jr. to gain her trust, Courtney reveals her identity to Yolanda and recruits her as the new Wildcat. The two sneak into the hospital to spy on Henry Sr., hoping to find the ISA's members through the visitor sheet, but then leave after witnessing their principal, Anaya Bowin, playing the violin for him and later discover her name was not on the visitor sheet. Their classmate, Beth Chapel, spots and recognizes them as they exit. Yolanda turns down Courtney's offer in favor of regaining her old life, but when her mother still considers her a disgrace, she changes her mind. Meanwhile, Icicle meets with Dragon King, who agrees to join the ISA to participate in "Project: New America". Elsewhere, William's widow Denise tells Pat that she is leaving, warning him not to trust Blue Valley's officials. Later, while visiting his friend Zeek's junkyard for spare parts, Pat finds Denise's cat, which leads him to her car's smashed remains.
5	5	"Hourman and Dr. Mid-Nite"	David Straiton	Melissa Carter	June 15, 2020
Nine years ago, Hourman mails his coded journal to Pat before he and his wife Wendi leave their son Rick Tyler in the care of Wendi's brother Matt Harris shortly before they are murdered in an orchestrated car crash. While stalking Courtney and Yolanda, Beth discovers a pair of goggles at the former's home that once belonged to fallen JSA member Doctor Mid-Nite along with its creator's A.I. facsimile "Chuck", who reveals that Rick is Hourman's son. Courtney takes Yolanda and Beth to a Halloween party to find Rick and give him his father's hourglass, which grants him super-strength for one hour per day. Not interested in becoming Hourman, Rick chooses to use his father's device for personal gain, including destroying his abusive uncle's truck and the tree where his parents were killed to vent his rage. Before a fight breaks out, Beth discovers that the ISA had Solomon Grundy kill Rick's parents. Rick agrees to join Courtney's JSA, but makes it clear he only wants revenge. Meanwhile, Bowin and Sharpe intercept and kill delivery drivers to steal a satellite dish for "Project: New America". Pat checks Courtney's room and discovers the JSA memorabilia in her closet.
6	6	"The Justice Society"	Christopher Manley	Taylor Streitz	June 22, 2020
After killing another football coach of their daughter Artemis Crock, Lawrence "Crusher" Crock and Paula Brooks are summoned by Icicle to aid Sharpe as their ISA identities Sportsmaster and Tigress, respectively. Pat confronts Courtney, ordering her to take back the JSA equipment she gave to her friends. Fearing for her teammates' lives, Courtney asks them to surrender their gear, but they all refuse and pressure her into letting them go after Sharpe when he attempts to hack a communications company for satellite codes. However, they are intercepted by Sportsmaster and Tigress, who easily overpower and nearly kill the teens before S.T.R.I.P.E. intervenes. Afterward, Pat talks to Courtney and clarifies that while her team is not ready to face the ISA, he agrees that a new JSA is needed and offers to help train them. Meanwhile, Barbara and Pat's son Mike bond when she makes a surprise visit to his science fair presentation, Cameron's cryokinetic powers start to develop, and Icicle brings the ISA together to figure out who the JSA's successors are and to wake Brainwave to complete "Project: New America".
7	7	"Shiv Part One"	Lea Thompson	Evan Ball	June 29, 2020
Pat makes an effort to train the new JSA, but Courtney's impatience leads her to sabotage the exercise by showing off, upsetting the team. Meanwhile, Cindy visits her father, Dragon King, revealing her enhanced abilities and demanding to join the ISA. He refuses her offer, and tells her to continue to monitor Henry Jr., who is slowly developing telepathic powers. Cindy feels increasingly isolated from her friends and peers, but when Courtney partners up with her in science class, they become friends. Jordan offers Barbara the chance to handle an important business deal for The American Dream. At a Blue Valley High football game, Mike expresses jealousy over Courtney spending more time with his dad than him. Cameron asks Courtney to Homecoming, and she chooses to leave Cindy behind. Angered by this, Cindy steals an experimental suit of armor and a flame-throwing staff from her father and goes to confront Stargirl, managing to stab her with her wrist blades. After the school janitor Justin defeats her with an enchanted sword, Cindy escapes while the Staff leads Pat to an unconscious Courtney.
8	8	"Shiv Part Two"	Geary McLeod	Paula Sevenbergen	July 6, 2020
Pat fakes a car accident to explain away Courtney's injuries, although he tells her that they need to reveal the truth about the JSA to Barbara. Cindy goes to her father, who reprimands her for disobeying him before paying a visit to Courtney to reveal she knows her identity and threaten to kill her and her friends. Jordan confronts an executive of the chemical company he blames for his wife's death and kills him. Beth and Pat pose as family members to infiltrate Cindy's house and investigate her family. They find a picture of Dragon King, who Chuck identifies as deceased war criminal Dr. Shiro Ito. The team is forced to make a hasty exit when Cindy unexpectedly returns home, unaware that Courtney thinks they are in danger. Henry discovers his telekinetic power and stumbles across his father's Brainwave costume and files, learning that Cindy has monitored him. He finds her fighting with Stargirl and fires a psychic wave that knocks them both down. Confused and scared, Henry telepathically discovers Courtney's identity before running away. Noting that his prediction was correct, Dragon King orders his drones to remove Cindy.
9	9	"Brainwave"	Tamra Davis	Colleen McGuinness	July 13, 2020
Decades prior, a young Henry Sr. killed a mugger in self-defense with his burgeoning psionic abilities. Courtney informs the JSA that she plans to recruit Henry Jr., but Yolanda and Rick disagree. With Cindy imprisoned, Dragon King meets with the ISA to report that he can use Henry Jr. to complete "Project: New America" and allow them to brainwash a large portion of the United States. Barbara invites Jordan to join her family for dinner. Pat assigns Rick and Beth to investigate Blue Valley's history, during which they discover the town's founders established a network of tunnels that enable the ISA to operate covertly. Courtney visits Henry Jr. and tries to convince him that his father's belief in humanity's inherent evil is wrong, but he forces her to leave. While having dinner with Jordan and his family, Courtney realizes that he is Icicle after seeing him handle a heated hot plate without being burned. While sharing her discovery with Pat, she unintentionally brandishes the Cosmic Staff in front of a shocked Barbara. Meanwhile, Henry Jr. accidentally kills his father's shady lawyer just as Henry Sr. wakes up.
10	10	"Brainwave Jr."	Andi Armaganian	James Dale Robinson	July 20, 2020
After blaming Pat for convincing Courtney to become a superhero, Barbara kicks him out and tells Courtney that they are leaving Blue Valley. After discovering Henry Sr. has amnesia and Jordan killed his mother Merri, Henry Jr. becomes convinced that he can save his father from Jordan's influence. When Pat goes to find Barbara, Courtney and the JSA, accompanied by Henry Jr., search for the ISA's headquarters. Barbara records a conversation with Jordan and his parents, wherein she and Pat learn about a "machine" that Jordan is building. As the JSA continue their search, they stumble across Dragon King's private lab, where Courtney, Yolanda, and Henry Jr. defeat him before locating Henry Sr., who has been cured of his amnesia. The team tries to escape, but he corners them. Henry Jr. tries to talk his father into abandoning Jordan, but Henry Sr. reveals he killed Merri before burying his son alive as the JSA watches in horror.
11	11	"Shining Knight"	Jennifer Phang	Geoff Johns	July 27, 2020
Kurtis arrives in Blue Valley and bonds with Courtney in the hopes of getting her locket and selling it off for money. Pat discovers this and confronts him, telling him to never return. Meanwhile, Justin suffers from memory loss and comes to Pat to remember his time as the Shining Knight. Courtney discovers Henry Sr. knows her identity and attempts to use the Staff, but it is still non-functional due to her lack of confidence stemming from her not being Starman's daughter and her fear that she is not good enough to be Stargirl. Pat and Barbara help her regain her confidence, and she activates the Staff with even more power than it had before. Elsewhere, Henry Sr. reveals Courtney's identity to Jordan and deduces Pat is Stripesy. Jordan hacks into Barbara's computer and finds that she has been looking into Starman's death and knows his identity, so he orders Henry Sr. to kill Courtney's family. Concurrently, the ISA find that they can brainwash half of the country due to Henry Sr.'s increasing power.
12	12	"Stars & S.T.R.I.P.E. Part One"	Toa Fraser	Melissa Carter	August 3, 2020
As "Project: New America" gets underway, Crusher and Paula are dispatched to kill Pat, Barbara, and Courtney, but the latter group defeat them with Mike's help, who learns about the JSA and his father and stepsister's involvement in it. The family, joined by the JSA and Justin, take refuge at Pat's cabin to formulate a plan to foil the ISA. After Anaya's son Isaac comes to her with his bully troubles, she encourages him to take revenge against his tormentors before meeting with Crusher and Paula, who kills her for calling them unfit parents. With Pat's help, Rick deciphers Hourman's journal and discovers a map of the ISA's underground lair. Beth hacks into the ISA's computers and discovers that while "Project: New America" aims to stop global warming, utilize clean energy, and eliminate discrimination, it will come at the cost of 25 million lives. Before the JSA can locate the ISA's synaptic amplifier, Dragon King initiates the brainwashing process, leaving Justin and Barbara in trance-like states while Pat is forced to fight Courtney.
13	13	"Stars & S.T.R.I.P.E. Part Two"	Greg Beeman	Geoff Johns	August 10, 2020
Beth frees Pat and Justin from their trances, leading to a showdown between the JSA and ISA, wherein Crusher and Paula are defeated while an escaped Cindy fatally wounds Dragon King. Sharpe releases Grundy, who severely damages Pat's armor before Rick beats Grundy into submission. As Rick spares him and allows him to leave, Yolanda kills Henry Sr. while Courtney destroys the synaptic amplifier, though Jordan destroys Beth's goggles and takes Barbara hostage. He tries to convince her to side with him, but Barbara refuses before Pat and Courtney fight Jordan, who is shattered when Mike hits him with a truck. Sharpe wipes the ISA's systems before escaping. In the aftermath, Justin departs Blue Valley to find the Seven Soldiers of Victory, former ISA member Shade watches the news pass off the ISA's plot as an earthquake from their now abandoned meeting room, and Cindy finds a gem containing "Eclipso" in William's storage unit. Six weeks later, the Whitmore-Dugan family celebrates Christmas with the JSA. Meanwhile, Sylvester Pemberton looks for Pat in California.

=== Season 2: Summer School (2021) ===
No. overall	No. in season	Title	Directed by	Written by	Original release date	U.S. viewers (millions)
14	1	"Summer School: Chapter One"	Andi Armaganian	Geoff Johns	August 10, 2021	0.72
Several decades earlier, Eclipso (in the form of a boy named Bruce) kills McNider's daughter, Rebecca. Six months after the ISA's defeat, Courtney and the JSA patrol Blue Valley for supervillains but fail to find anything. Pat plans a family camping trip to Yellowstone National Park, but Courtney is assigned summer school by Bowin's successor Harold Sherman after failing several classes and getting into a fight with Artemis. Rick secretly cares for Grundy while Beth successfully reboots Chuck amidst her neglectful parents filing for divorce, though Chuck has no memory of her. Suffering from post-traumatic stress disorder after killing Brainwave, Yolanda urges Courtney to stay away from Cameron lest she reveals her part in his father's death. Elsewhere, Sylvester arrives in Nevada and asks a waitress for Pat's whereabouts. Zeek finds the S.T.R.I.P.E. armor, but mistakes it for a robot project and suggests modifications. Later that night, Courtney is attacked by a girl calling herself "Green Lantern's daughter" while Cindy and Eclipso begin recruiting for a new ISA called "Injustice Unlimited", with Artemis, Cameron, Isaac, and Mike as prospective candidates.
15	2	"Summer School: Chapter Two"	Andi Armaganian	James Dale Robinson	August 17, 2021	0.70
Green Lantern's supposed daughter introduces herself as Jennie-Lynn Scott, the daughter of deceased JSA member Alan Scott, but Courtney is skeptical, believing she may be a mole for the ISA. As Pat welcomes Jennie and teaches her to harness her power, which appears to be connected to her lantern, Courtney attends summer school with Yolanda. Pat introduces the new JSA to Jennie. Courtney berates her, but later apologizes when she realizes that she is jealous that Jennie is actually the daughter of a superhero while she is not. Jennie, feeling isolated and emotional about her missing brother Todd Rice, breaks the lantern and strengthens her powers. Pat deduces that she herself is the energy source and not the lantern. That night, Jennie leaves unnoticed. Meanwhile, antiquities collector Richard Swift calls Barbara to ask about William's equipment; Pat later identifies Swift as Shade. Elsewhere, Cindy visits her estranged stepmother Bobbie Burman, but struggles to control Eclipso and inadvertently allows him to consume Bobbie.
16	3	"Summer School: Chapter Three"	Lea Thompson	Turi Meyer & Alfredo Septién	August 24, 2021	0.60
11 years ago, JSA member Johnny Thunder meets with Pat to discuss Johnny's genie-like partner Thunderbolt. In the present, Mike experiences trouble with his paperwork business when he unknowingly grabs Thunderbolt's pen and activates him. After explaining how his wish-based powers work and seeing the late Johnny in him, Thunderbolt helps Mike seek revenge on his bullies, which Courtney and Yolanda notice. They tell Pat, but he fails to reclaim the pen. Upon learning Johnny's last wish before he died was for Thunderbolt to make a new friend, Pat allows him and Mike to stay together and help the new JSA. Working together, Mike and Thunderbolt determine Shade's location and join the JSA in confronting him, but fail to capture him before he escapes. Later that night, Mike unknowingly wishes for Thunderbolt to be in better hands, and the pen ends up at Mike's friend, Jakeem Williams' house while Chuck warns Beth of Eclipso.
17	4	"Summer School: Chapter Four"	Lea Thompson	Taylor Streitz	August 31, 2021	0.68
While Cindy recruits Isaac into Injustice Unlimited, Artemis visits her imprisoned parents to discuss her recent emotional struggles and upcoming football tryouts. Seeking to help their daughter, Crusher and Paula break out and kidnap Mike to force Pat to help them attend the tryouts until it ends, after which they will return to prison and free Mike. Before the tryouts, Crusher and Paula bond with Pat and Barbara. Courtney attempts to research Eclipso's origins and a "Bruce Gordon", but encounters Shade, who claims he wants to eliminate Eclipso. Pat accompanies Crusher and Paula to the tryouts, whose presence lifts Artemis' spirit. Cindy and Eclipso however arrive at Blue Valley High and enchant Artemis into attacking Courtney, who learned of Crusher and Paula's attendance. After the tryouts, Pat allows Crusher and Paula to have a heart-to-heart with Artemis before taking them back to prison. Following this, Artemis learns she is not being recruited for college due to her attacking Courtney and Cindy meets with Artemis to ask her to join Injustice Unlimited. Meanwhile, Beth hears McNider calling for help through Chuck as he wanders through a dark location.
18	5	"Summer School: Chapter Five"	Sheelin Choksey	Steve Harper	September 7, 2021	0.64
10 years ago, Cindy is awakened from a nightmare about her father while Dragon King secretly watches from afar. In the present, Cindy attempts to recruit Cameron while he is working on a mural for his father, but his grandmother Lily uses her own cryokinetic powers to stop Cindy. Meanwhile, Courtney confronts Pat about Shade's intentions. As a mysterious storm rolls in, Cindy tries to recruit Cameron again, but he rebukes her. On her way out, she uses Eclipso to enchant the art teacher Paul Deisinger. Shade visits Barbara regarding Courtney's search for him and leaves his number while Beth tells Pat about McNider. As Deisinger is engulfed by a paint blob, the JSA visit the school to investigate, but the affected Deisinger causes them to see nightmares until Courtney rescues him, negating Eclipso's powers. Deisinger later ends up in psychiatric evaluation. While Beth confronts her parents about their divorce, Cindy fails to recruit Cameron a third time and meets with Artemis and Isaac with a plan to recruit Mike instead. Cameron continues working on the mural until he suffers a hand cramp and drops his ice-covered paintbrush.
19	6	"Summer School: Chapter Six"	Walter Carlos Garcia	Paula Sevenbergen	September 14, 2021	0.58
Beth struggles to get her parents to talk to each other. She and Yolanda are threatened by Isaac and Artemis. While cleaning up at Blue Valley High, Courtney, Pat, and Cameron find a painting of Cindy holding Eclipso. Isaac and Artemis attack Pat and damage S.T.R.I.P.E. while Cindy abducts Mike and calls Courtney to meet. With Pat hospitalized, Courtney fears that she can't defeat Cindy without him. Barbara reassures her and informs Shade that Cindy has Eclipso. The JSA fight and defeat Cindy's team while Beth frees Mike. Shade intervenes when Cindy attempts to use Eclipso, but Courtney destroys the Black Diamond, releasing Eclipso. He uses a diamond shard to absorb Cindy, consumes Isaac, injures Rick, disables the Cosmic Staff, and forces Shade and Artemis to flee before doing the same. Afterwards, Mike resolves to improve his training and build his own S.T.R.I.P.E. Elsewhere, Eclipso assumes Bruce's form.
20	7	"Summer School: Chapter Seven"	Sheelin Choksey	Robbie Hyne	September 21, 2021	0.58
Courtney struggles to restore the Cosmic Staff and begins talking to Cameron more often. Barbara finds a strange substance dripping from the ceiling and believes Shade is responsible. Yolanda continues to struggle with Brainwave's death and begins hearing his voice before unknowingly meeting Bruce. While in class, Yolanda is taunted by a vision of Henry Jr. and Brainwave. Courtney consoles her and advises her to tell Rick and Beth. When she does so however, Yolanda states that they and Courtney have never killed anyone and that since they will not be willing to kill Eclipso, she must be the one to do so. Later, she goes to church to confess, but is taunted by visions of Henry Jr. burning and Brainwave attacking Courtney. After Courtney awakens her, Yolanda lashes out at Courtney over choosing her to become Wildcat and quits the JSA. Meanwhile, as Pat and Mike work to repair S.T.R.I.P.E., Mike finds fragments of the Black Diamond and hallucinates leeches attacking his skin before being awakened by Pat, who hopes that the Black Diamond could imprison Eclipso. That night, Bruce appears outside Beth's house.
21	8	"Summer School: Chapter Eight"	Andi Armaganian	Steve Harper	September 28, 2021	0.47
Yolanda returns the Wildcat gear to Courtney. Rick receives a visit from his teacher Miss Woods, who gives him information about applying to college before his uncle Matt tells her to leave. Rick goes to the forest and expresses his frustrations to a sympathetic Grundy. Meanwhile, Eclipso causes Beth to hallucinate that her parents blame her for their divorce and casts doubts about her inclusion in the JSA, but Beth's self-confidence enables her to return to reality. McNider tells Beth he is being hunted. Eclipso manipulates Rick into thinking that Grundy killed a little girl and attacks him. Courtney and Pat stop him, and Rick realizes he mistakenly attacked Matt. Rick destroys the hourglass amulet and is arrested while Matt is hospitalized and Grundy solemnly watches from afar. That night, frost encases the Whitmore-Dugan house.
22	9	"Summer School: Chapter Nine"	Andi Armaganian	Alfredo Septién & Turi Meyer	October 5, 2021	0.47
Several decades earlier, Eclipso persuades Bruce to give him control of his body. Years later, the original JSA attends Rebecca's funeral. Starman learns from Shade that killing Bruce will force Eclipso back into the Black Diamond, but Pat and Jay Garrick advise him not to. When Eclipso threatens their families and defeats the rest of the JSA, Starman reluctantly kills Bruce. In the present, Courtney and Beth strategize a plan to defeat Eclipso without Yolanda and Rick as a storm rolls in. Barbara gets caught in it and Eclipso causes her to see Icicle, Mike to see Cameron attacking and taunting him over his birth mother leaving him while seeking revenge for his father's death, and Pat to see Bruce and the JSA taunting him over his silence regarding the truth about Eclipso's imprisonment until Shade awakens Barbara and Courtney awakens Mike and Pat. Pat tells Courtney the truth and that Barbara already knows, angering Courtney and causing her to lash out at them while Eclipso watches from outside.
23	10	"Summer School: Chapter Ten"	Sheelin Choksey	Taylor Streitz	October 12, 2021	0.56
Following Gordon's death, Starman reveals to Pat that Eclipso had threatened Pat's life and they reconcile. In the present as Courtney argues with her parents, an injured Shade appears and claims that they can trap Eclipso by fixing the Black Diamond with the Cosmic Staff. This fails, so Pat suggests they use Jennie's power ring. Pat and Courtney find her at a Civic City rehabilitation facility searching for Todd. After leaving, head nurse Louise Love informs her boss Mister Bones about Jennie and that she covered up where Todd really is. Meanwhile, McNider contacts Beth and reveals that Shade rescued him from the ISA, but accidentally lost him in the Shadowlands and Shade received his powers after being unsuccessfully sacrificed to Eclipso in the 1800s. At the old JSA headquarters, Jennie repairs the Black Diamond, but Beth realizes too late that Shade lied. After the diamond restores Shade's powers and summons Eclipso, he knocks out Jennie and uses the diamond to absorb Courtney despite Pat's best efforts.
24	11	"Summer School: Chapter Eleven"	Sheelin Choksey	Paula Sevenbergen & Robbie Hyne	October 19, 2021	0.52
Courtney awakens in the Shadowlands, where she is taunted by illusions of the Zaricks and the Bowins in a black-and-white Blue Valley. She is attacked by Cindy, but the two realize they are both real and escape from an illusion of Dragon King. Cindy blames Courtney for being trapped in the Shadowlands and the two argue before the former is dragged away by Dragon King's drones. Courtney pursues her, but gets lost and is rescued by McNider. He informs Beth of her survival, so Jennie uses her power ring to track down Shade who can bring them back. Pat and Barbara find him recuperating in a movie theater and convince him to bring Courtney back. Despite still being weakened, Shade opens a door to the Shadowlands, allowing Courtney and McNider to return after rescuing Cindy from Dragon King. Shade seemingly dies from overusing his powers and dissolves, requesting that his good deed be remembered.
25	12	"Summer School: Chapter Twelve"	Greg Beeman	James Dale Robinson	October 26, 2021	0.62
Jennie is unknowingly infected by dark matter residue. Courtney comes home to find the Cosmic Staff at full power and agrees to a truce with Cindy. Courtney tells Yolanda that she was not the first JSA member to kill, but this only upsets her further. Pat coerces Matt into dropping the charges against Rick. Mike finds Jakeem with the pink pen and convinces him to help the JSA. Cindy goes to Yolanda and tells her about the truce, prompting her to return temporarily. Rick studies his father's journal, hoping to recreate the Hourglass Amulet. Cindy calls an unknown group for help. McNider deduces that Courtney's light can stop Eclipso and works with Beth to find him, but he intercepts them and allows Beth to summon the JSA for his plan to feed on Courtney's darkness. Meanwhile, Jennie has visions of Courtney becoming Eclipso's host.
26	13	"Summer School: Chapter Thirteen"	Greg Beeman	Geoff Johns	November 2, 2021	0.57
As Eclipso merges Earth with the Shadowlands, the JSA are joined by Grundy, Crusher, Paula, Sylvester, and Thunderbolt, the last of whom repairs S.T.R.I.P.E., in fighting him, but Eclipso defeats them all and kills Grundy. Shade returns and rescues Beth's parents. Courtney admits her hatred for Eclipso, allowing him to make her his new host. Sylvester and the JSA help her regain control, and Thunderbolt turns Eclipso into a slice of toast. Afterwards, Sylvester offers to teach Courtney more about the Cosmic Staff. Yolanda and Cindy decide to remain with the JSA while Mike and Jakeem discuss their own team. McNider leaves to find his wife and son, and Beth's parents decide to stay together. Cameron's grandparents reveal their cryokinetic powers to him. Shade remains in Blue Valley and hints to Rick that Grundy could be revived. The Crocks move next door to the Whitmore-Dugans. At the Helix Institute for Youth Rehabilitation, Nurse Love informs Mister Bones about the heroes and villains in Blue Valley as they make plans to visit.

=== Season 3: Frenemies (2022) ===
No. overall	No. in season	Title	Directed by	Written by	Original release date	U.S. viewers (millions)
27	1	"Frenemies – Chapter One: The Murder"	Andi Armaganian	Geoff Johns	August 31, 2022	0.50
After the Whitmore-Dugans return from a camping trip, Sylvester theorizes that he was reawakened by Courtney's bond with the staff. Despite promising not to return to action as Starman, he is caught with the staff, though he and Courtney later agree to share it. Steven Sharpe returns to Blue Valley hoping to make amends, but Shade tells him to leave and Crusher warns Pat that he cannot be trusted. Yolanda and Rick are displeased by Courtney's insistence to trust the villains living in Blue Valley and with Cindy's inclusion in the JSA. They locate the No Limit Gang, previous associates of Sharpe's, but they watch in astonishment as the gang is defeated by Artemis, who appeared out of nowhere and is looking to join the JSA. While Sharpe writes a letter for his daughter Rebecca, he discovers surveillance cameras placed throughout Blue Valley and is killed by an unknown assailant. The JSA find him dead and see Cindy standing over him with a gun, professing her innocence.
28	2	"Frenemies – Chapter Two: The Suspects"	Andi Armaganian	Robbie Hyne	September 7, 2022	0.49
Twelve hours prior, Sharpe moves back into his trailer, with Shade following him soon after. In the present, Cindy claims she was checking to see if Sharpe was working with the No Limit Gang again. Beth discovers Sharpe was stabbed in the heart, not shot. Courtney and Pat theorize that the killer stole Sharpe's laptop and resolve to deliver his letter to Rebecca. The following day, Paula tells Barbara that the Crocks are innocent. Sylvester aggressively questions Shade, who admits that he met Sharpe a second time to make amends. After training, Courtney has Sylvester apologize to Shade, but this leads to another fight. Mike and Jakeem attempt to use Thunderbolt to learn the killer's name, only to learn the killer has many names. Cameron struggles to continue painting with his powers hurting his hand. That night, Rick works on the amulet, Shade leaves Blue Valley to attend to other matters, Cindy attempts to open Sharpe's laptop in the former ISA meeting room, and Crusher and Paula note that a secret of theirs' will soon be found out.
29	3	"Frenemies – Chapter Three: The Blackmail"	Walter Carlos Garcia	Taylor Streitz	September 14, 2022	0.51
Cindy secretly sends Beth evidence of Sharpe blackmailing the Crocks and informs Sylvester, hoping to gain his approval. Sylvester rebukes her and fights them alone at a supermarket. Pat stops him, and Crusher admits to nearly attacking Sharpe and that the Crocks were paid back. At school, Cameron ignores Courtney and after arguing with Rick, uses his powers to give him a flat tire. Meanwhile, Sylvester tries to find a job, Paula joins a rotary club, and Barbara struggles to win the approval of her manager Tim T. Tattle. That night, Pat sews a costume, Paula confronts Tim in his office over his treatment of Barbara and Cindy tries to get into Sharpe's files on Dragon King. Cameron apologizes to Courtney and walks with her, but leaves abruptly. As someone continues surveilling Blue Valley, Sylvester returns to the crime scene and is knocked out by a roaring assailant.
30	4	"Frenemies – Chapter Four: The Evidence"	Walter Carlos Garcia	Paula Sevenbergen	September 21, 2022	0.39
Sylvester is rushed to the hospital. Pat brings in McNider, who explains that Sylvester is still alive because the Staff altered his physiology and that he survived several years in suspended animation before waking up in the present. At the crime scene, Beth finds a skin cell that seemingly belongs to Dragon King. The next day, Courtney tries to talk to Cameron, but this angers him and he accidentally unleashes his powers. He reveals that he knows Jordan's death was not an accident and wants to continue his legacy of helping people. Courtney convinces him to use his powers to make art and they share a kiss. Meanwhile, Pat gives Sylvester a new Starman suit. He then goes searching for Dragon King in the tunnels beneath Blue Valley with Yolanda and Rick. As Cindy's skin begins developing scales, she realizes that the skin cell belonged to her.
31	5	"Frenemies – Chapter Five: The Thief"	Lea Thompson	Steve Harper	October 5, 2022	0.37
After Cameron walks her home, Courtney steals Icicle's JSA file. Cindy hacks into Sharpe's laptop and learns about her father's other labs, but escapes just as Sylvester, Yolanda, and Rick enter. The next day, Cindy declines an invitation to join Mike and Jakeem's team and later discusses an old secret with Cameron. Sylvester searches one of Dragon King's former labs, but finds nothing. The JSA disapproves of Courtney's relationship with Cameron, though Sylvester advises them to not let it affect the team. That night, Rick removes the hourglass's limiter to gain longer periods of strength, Beth convinces her parents to stay out of her life as Doctor Mid-Nite in order to keep them from meeting the same fate as Sylvester's sister, and Courtney sneaks out to Cameron's house to help with his powers. As Cindy investigates one of her father's labs, Yolanda breaks into her house and finds Sharpe's laptop.
32	6	"Frenemies – Chapter Six: The Betrayal"	Lea Thompson	Alfredo Septién & Turi Meyer	October 12, 2022	0.48
Courtney continues coaching Cameron as he conjures an ice sculpture of his father. They return to his house and walk in on Pat and Barbara talking with his grandparents about how they have been spending time together. Lily is hostile, though Sofus wants what is best for Cameron. That night, Beth downloads everything on Sharpe's laptop and Yolanda tries to return it to Cindy's house to avoid suspicion, but is caught. Rick joins Yolanda in fighting her and they notice her scales. Beth discovers the camera feed surveilling Blue Valley and sees the fight, so she calls in Courtney to stop them. Cindy angrily reveals that Courtney has been coaching Cameron and threatens to tell him about her role in Icicle's death. Yolanda and Rick lash out at Courtney. Sylvester later consoles her. Later, Beth tells Pat and Courtney that they are being watched while the person surveilling them continues working on a puzzle of a skull.
33	7	"Frenemies – Chapter Seven: Infinity Inc. Part One"	Glen Winter	James Dale Robinson	October 19, 2022	0.42
Six months prior, Jennie puts on her father's ring for the first time. At that moment, her brother Todd Rice is overtaken by a dark force and found by police. They take him to the Helix Institute, where he is introduced to Love and Bones. In the present, Beth and Sylvester shut down Blue Valley's power grid while the JSA works to find and destroy the cameras. Yolanda is caught by Maria and is kicked out after refusing to turn over her phone, so she goes to Barbara and Mike. Meanwhile, Shade returns and brings Courtney and Pat to Jennie under the Helix Institute. Shade and Jennie have been drawing on each other's powers ever since Jennie was infected by dark matter residue, and Courtney theorizes that rescuing Todd will allow them to sever the link. They find him being kept under a light suppressing his powers and he claims that he will destroy the world if removed. Jennie tries to free him, but he inadvertently unleashes a wave of shadowy energy that sends Pat and Shade to the Shadowlands.
34	8	"Frenemies – Chapter Eight: Infinity Inc. Part Two"	Glen Winter	Paula Sevenbergen & Robbie Hyne	October 26, 2022	0.50
Unable to leave, Pat and Shade encounter illusions of their family and Sharpe. Shade is taunted over his decision to ignore his dying sister Emily while Pat faces his strained relationships with his father and Mike. Meanwhile, Courtney awakens locked in Love's office. Bones and Love explain that Helix's patients willingly keep themselves isolated due to their dangerous powers, but Courtney believes that Jennie's light can help Todd. They reluctantly allow Jennie to reunite with Todd, calming his powers and allowing Pat and Shade to return. As the group leaves, Bones considers forming his own team. Pat and Courtney openly accuse Helix of having planted the surveillance cameras all over Blue Valley, but Love denies any knowledge, as well as any involvement of anyone at Helix, of this scheme. Pat convinces Shade to mentor Todd, and he leaves with him and Jennie for New York in search of Sandy Hawkins, who has prophetic nightmares and helped Jennie find Todd. Courtney and Pat take a bus home, and she resolves to make amends with her team. In Blue Valley's sewers, a caped figure punches one of the camera monitors.
35	9	"Frenemies – Chapter Nine: The Monsters"	Andi Armaganian	Geoff Johns	November 2, 2022	0.44
Courtney reconciles with the JSA and gets their support in telling Cameron the truth. Rick is reluctant, but agrees to help them. Mr. Deisinger tries to convince Sofus and Lily into letting Cameron rejoin art class, but is killed by Lily. While Pat searches for Mike's mother online, Paula tries to teach Barbara self-defense. As Courtney meets with Cameron, Beth finds that the camera signal is coming from his house. Lily attacks Courtney and the rest of the JSA break in. Beth's father has her activate her suit's combat mode, and she fights Sofus alongside Artemis while Rick and Yolanda fight Cameron and Lily. After Cameron defeats Rick, Lily tells him to kill Rick, but Sofus stops them and suffers a heart attack, though Beth is able to use her gloves as defibrillators to save him. Meanwhile, Mike, Jakeem, and Thunderbolt search for Cindy in a farmhouse but are chased away by a giant albino gorilla that vows to kill them.
36	10	"Frenemies – Chapter Ten: The Killer"	Andi Armaganian	James Dale Robinson & Taylor Streitz	November 9, 2022	0.47
Sylvester theorizes that the signal coming from the Mahkent house was a distraction. Sofus returns home from the hospital and is interrogated by Pat and Sylvester about Mike and Jakeem's whereabouts. Beth and her parents treat Rick's injuries and notice his rising aggression and addiction to the hourglass. Paula defends Barbara from Lily and later tries to teach her how to use a crossbow. Courtney tells Cameron she killed his father and he states that he does not want to see her again. In the forest, Mike and Jakeem find Cindy, who has been hunting the gorilla. After they return home using Thunderbolt, Pat and Sylvester identify the gorilla as the Ultra-Humanite, an old JSA enemy who had Dragon King implant their brain into the body of actress Dolores Winters. Crusher and Paula convince Sofus and Lily to forgive everyone for Cameron's sake. That night, after Artemis calls them about her getting into college, Crusher and Paula find the monitor room in the sewers and are frozen to death by the caped figure who is revealed to be Jordan Mahkent.
37	11	"Frenemies – Chapter Eleven: The Haunting"	Jennifer Phang	Steve Harper & Maytal Zchut	November 16, 2022	0.49
Jordan's shattered pieces melted and retreated into the sewers where he spent the following year reconstituting himself. In the present, Artemis and the JSA track Crusher's mask to the sewers, where they find his and Paula's remains. Jordan returns home and tells his family that Mike killed him, but he does not desire revenge. He returns to the American Dream where he tells Barbara that he is willing to help the JSA defeat the Ultra-Humanite and claims that killing Crusher and Paula was an accident. Mike and Jakeem are unable to depower Jordan with Thunderbolt since doing so would kill him and Thunderbolt is not allowed to kill. Cindy also agrees to their alliance. That night, Cameron tries to rekindle his relationship with Courtney. After she briefly encounters Jordan, Sylvester asks her if he can take the Staff to kill Jordan. Barbara has Artemis stay with the Whitmore-Dugans. Yolanda briefly calls her mother to tell her that she only lied to protect her. In the forest, Jordan tells the Ultra-Humanite that "it's time".
38	12	"Frenemies – Chapter Twelve: The Last Will and Testament of Sylvester Pemberton"	Jennifer Phang	Turi Meyer & Alfredo Septién	November 30, 2022	0.44
In flashbacks, Winters plots with Dragon King to capture an albino gorilla to use as a new body. In the present, Sylvester promises Artemis that he will kill Jordan in her stead and tells Beth and Yolanda to find successors for the other fallen JSA members. Jordan tells Cameron that the Ultra-Humanite may have attacked Deisinger and offers to go after him. As Sylvester leaves to fight Jordan, he berates Pat, destroys S.T.R.I.P.E. and steals the Staff from Courtney. Pat realizes Sylvester was lying to protect him and follows him, only to be knocked out by Sylvester, who is revealed to be in league with Jordan. Meanwhile, with help from Thunderbolt, Jakeem, Mike, and Cindy find one of Dragon King's labs, but are ambushed by the Ultra-Humanite, who they realize has Dragon King's brain. Rick tells the JSA that Sylvester had him remove the Hourglass' limiter, and Beth notes that Rex became addicted without the limiter and that Sylvester knew this would happen. Pat awakens and is buried alive by Sylvester, who has had the Ultra-Humanite's brain all along.
39	13	"Frenemies – Chapter Thirteen: The Reckoning"	Walter Carlos Garcia	Geoff Johns	December 7, 2022	0.46
Pat escapes and reveals the truth about Sylvester before joining Barbara, Mike's group, and the JSA in fighting Sylvester and the Mahkents at the junkyard. Lily is crushed to death by a falling car, Courtney takes back the staff, Jakeem has Thunderbolt turn Dragon King into a stuffed animal, Pat irreversibly damages the Ultra-Humanite's brain, and Cameron shatters Jordan before leaving with Sofus. Afterwards, Rick apologizes to Beth's family and Beth lets her parents become her sidekicks. Pat keeps Sylvester's body on life support, Mike meets his mother, Courtney delivers Sharpe's letter to Rebecca and later reunites with Cameron, Grundy reawakens, and Yolanda considers telling her mother the truth. Three months later, Artemis burns a reconstituted Jordan alive in Copenhagen. Over the following ten years, Sylvester's brain is found and he is revived, the JSA rescues the other Seven Soldiers of Victory from Nebula Man, and Rick and Beth get engaged. While working as a tour guide for a JSA museum, Shade is interrupted by Jay Garrick, who tells him that the JSA is needed and that their adventures are not over.

== Production ==
=== Development ===
In July 2018, DC Universe gave a series order to Stargirl, consisting of thirteen episodes. The pilot was written by Geoff Johns, who also executive produces alongside Greg Berlanti, Sarah Schechter, and Melissa Carter (who is co-showrunner with Johns). Production companies involved with the series are Mad Ghost Productions, Berlanti Productions, and Warner Bros. Television. The series was said to be a "reimagining" of Stargirl. The CW renewed the series for a second season in July 2020, resulting in the series moving exclusively to the network as a CW original series. The second season is subtitled Summer School. Ahead of the second-season premiere, The CW renewed the series for a third season in May 2021. The renewal allowed the series to be co-financed by HBO Max, part of a larger deal between The CW and HBO Max. The third season is subtitled Frenemies. The CW canceled the show with the third and last season, ending on December 7, 2022.

=== Writing ===
Johns described Stargirl as having a similar tone to 1980s films such as E.T. the Extra-Terrestrial and Back to the Future. The start of the series sees the deaths of the original members of the Justice Society of America (JSA). With the younger generation taking up their mantle, Johns said their "paths aren't complete. They don't know where they're going to be or what they're going to be. And so, there's all sorts of mistakes they can make and choices they can make, and who knows what their ultimate destiny will be?... It makes for a lot of fun and a lot of unpredictability". The members of the Injustice Society mirrors those on the JSA team, with Johns teasing that just about everyone who has been a member of the Injustice Society in the comics would appear in the series. Speaking to classic JSA members such as Alan Scott and Jay Garrick, Johns called them the "elderly statesmen" and that they "are spoken of and they exist in the JSA" with "their legacies... felt throughout the show". There were also "plans in the future for things". For the first season, star Brec Bassinger felt the original Doctor Mid-Nite, Charles McNider would have "a significant role to play", while Johns added the season would establish the Seven Soldiers of Victory as the first superhero team before the JSA and explore the history of the Cosmic Staff. Regarding the death of Henry King, Jr., Johns revealed that he always "had a finite story", going "from this almost unlikeable bully to possibly a redeemed hero, and then ultimately die protecting his new friends when facing his father, while also learning a lesson that Courtney imparted on him and apologizing to Yolanda". Johns spoke with actor Jake Austin Walker before he signed on to play the character to inform him of this and discuss the character with him. The character's return in the season one finale with his father pretending to be his son was done to subvert the "nobody ever dies" superhero trope.

Yolanda Montez's struggle with killing Brainwave was "a big part of season 2". Johns added that compared to Rick Tyler, who is "starting to kind of turn a corner" after overcoming his anger for his parents' death, Yolanda is "turning the other way... She's lost in her own world, thinking about what she has done" since she was not ready to kill someone, unlike Rick. Additionally, more motivations from the surviving members of the Injustice Society are explored in the second season.

Bassinger teased that the third season would feature a murder mystery.

=== Casting ===
Brec Bassinger was cast as Courtney Whitmore / Stargirl in September 2018. Johns called the casting of Stargirl a difficult process, auditioning hundreds of actresses for the role. On why Bassinger was perfect for the role, Johns said: "Immediately... I knew she was Courtney. She has the humor, she has the enthusiasm, the energy, the innate optimism, and Brec really embodies who Stargirl is". The following roles were cast in November: Anjelika Washington as Beth Chapel / Doctor Mid-Nite, Yvette Monreal as Yolanda Montez / Wildcat, and Christopher James Baker as Henry King / Brainwave. In January 2019, Luke Wilson was cast as Pat Dugan / S.T.R.I.P.E. Amy Smart joined the cast as Barbara Whitmore in February, along with Neil Jackson as Jordan Mahkent / Icicle, Trae Romano as Mike Dugan, Hunter Sansone as Cameron, and Cameron Gellman as Rick Tyler / Hourman. Also Jake Austin Walker was cast as Henry King Jr. and Meg DeLacy cast as Cindy Burman.

The following members of the Justice Society of America were cast in December 2018: Joel McHale as Sylvester Pemberton / Starman, Lou Ferrigno Jr. as Rex Tyler / Hourman, Brian Stapf as Ted Grant / Wildcat, and Henry Thomas as Charles McNider / Doctor Mid-Nite. As well, Joy Osmanski was cast as Paula Brooks / Tigress, Neil Hopkins was cast as Lawrence "Crusher" Crock / Sportsmaster, and Nelson Lee was cast as Dr. Ito / Dragon King, members of the Injustice Society. In April 2019, Hina Khan was cast as Anaya Bowin. In October 2020, Nick Tarabay joined the cast as a series regular as Eclipso while Jonathan Cake was cast as Shade and Ysa Penarejo was cast in an undisclosed role in recurring capacities for the second season (later revealed to be Jennifer-Lynn Hayden / Jade, the daughter of Green Lantern), while Jim Gaffigan was cast as the voice of Thunderbolt. The following month, Alkoya Brunson was cast in a recurring role as Jakeem Thunder. In February 2021, John Wesley Shipp was revealed to be reprising his role as Jay Garrick from The Flash, albeit as an alternate version. Alex Collins replaced Thomas as Doctor Mid-Nite for the second season. Hopkins and Osmanski were promoted to series regulars for the third season in August 2021, following their recurring roles in the first season and guest appearance in the second. McHale was also promoted to a series regular in October for the third season following his guest appearances in the first two seasons.

In March 2022, Tim Gabriel was cast as Todd Rice / Obsidian. In May, Seth Green joined the cast in recasting to succeed Gaffigan who voiced Thunderbolt last season. The third season trailer confirmed the return of Eric Goins as Steven Sharpe / Gambler, who appeared in the first but was absent from the second.

=== Design ===
Costume designer LJ Shannon "tried to stay as true to the [comics] lore as possible" in her designs. Each of the costumes are "utilitarian" with individual looks. Johns described Doctor Mid-Nite's as "[a] little steampunky" with canvas and leather and Hourman's as "a little more slick". Legacy Effects created a practical S.T.R.I.P.E. for use during filming.

=== Filming ===
Filming began in March 2019 with Glen Winter directing the pilot. Christopher Manley and Scott Peck were directors of photography on the series. Filming occurred throughout the Atlanta metropolitan area, including: Marietta, Virginia–Highland, Duluth, Lithia Springs, Dallas, Marietta Square, West End, Westlake High School, the Atlanta Center for Medical Research, Campbell Middle School, Paulding County, Smyrna, Arbor Place Mall, Vinings, Mableton, and Douglas County High School. Walter Garcia served as the series' stunt coordinator and second-unit director. He was hired to help Stargirl's staff "have a personality and be alive when she fights with it". The series continued to film in Atlanta for the second season, with filming beginning by October 28, 2020.

=== Visual effects ===
Zoic Studios provided visual effects for the series. According to Johns, Stargirl was the first Warner Bros. Television series to use previsualization (a process most commonly used by feature films) for their effects scenes. Previsualization was handled by The Third Floor, Inc. Johns brought his experience working on the films Wonder Woman (2017), Aquaman (2018), and Shazam! (2019) to help the series have visuals not "seen in superhero shows before".

=== Music ===
Pinar Toprak is a composer for the series.

== Release ==
Stargirl premiered on DC Universe on May 18, 2020, with the first season consisting of 13 episodes. The series was originally intended to premiere on May 11, seven days before its official release. The series was released in 4K Ultra HD on DC Universe.

In November 2019, The CW announced to broadcast each episode the day after it premieres on the streaming service, with each episode available to stream on The CW's online platforms after its broadcast. Stargirl started airing on The CW on May 19, 2020, at 8 pm. Some episodes have content removed when they air on The CW to allow for the network's commercials, notably approximately eight minutes in each of the first two episodes. DC Universe streamed the full episodes, and Johns said starting with the third episode, both releases are "almost identical". The series release plans shifted and it stayed in post-production longer to accommodate the broadcast on The CW to accomplish the adjustments that had to be made.

Scenes removed in the first episode from The CW broadcast included: establishing shots of Barbara Whitmore's new job, and Pat's auto shop; an interaction between Courtney and Cindy Burman in the halls of Blue Valley High School that Alex Zalben of Decider said was "clear set-up for later" but helped strengthen Courtney's emotional arc; and Mark Ashworth's scenes as "a mysterious, extremely creepy bearded janitor", which Zalben said was more of "a fun Easter egg that will pay dividends down the road"; and Courtney finding a newspaper article about Starman and Stripesy. The first season became available on HBO Max on December 1, 2020.

The second season of the series airs exclusively on The CW, and premiered on August 10, 2021; it also debuted on HBO Max on December 10 the same year. The third season premiered on August 31, 2022. The season debuted on HBO Max on January 6, 2023.

=== Marketing ===
A teaser trailer was released in December 2019. In early August 2020, The CW released several posters for its Arrowverse series with the superheroes wearing face masks, including Stargirl, with all posters having the caption "Real Heroes Wear Masks". This marketing tactic was used to "stress the importance of wearing masks while out in public to help stop the spread of" COVID-19.

== Reception ==
=== Ratings ===
==== Season 1 ====
The following table represents viewership data for each episode's airing on The CW, as DC Universe did not release viewership information. The pilot episode was tied for the second-best series debut on The CW for the 2019–20 television season with Nancy Drew after Batwoman, and was the best summer series premiere on the network since Whose Line Is It Anyway? season nine in 2013. Through the first seven episodes of the season, Stargirl was averaging a 0.2 rating for adults 18–49 and close to 1 million initial viewers per episode, which was "on par" with The CW's Arrowverse series.

Viewership and ratings per episode of Stargirl
No.	Title	Air date	Rating (18–49)	Viewers (millions)	DVR (18–49)	DVR viewers (millions)	Total (18–49)	Total viewers (millions)
1	"Pilot"	May 19, 2020	0.3	1.22	0.2	0.54	0.5	1.77
2	"S.T.R.I.P.E."	May 26, 2020	0.3	1.19	0.2	0.63	0.4	1.82
3	"Icicle"	June 2, 2020	0.2	0.96	0.2	0.72	0.4	1.68
4	"Wildcat"	June 9, 2020	0.2	1.10	0.2	0.56	0.4	1.65
5	"Hourman and Dr. Mid-Nite"	June 16, 2020	0.2	0.94	0.2	0.76	0.4	1.70
6	"The Justice Society"	June 23, 2020	0.2	0.92	0.2	0.71	0.4	1.63
7	"Shiv Part One"	June 30, 2020	0.2	0.99	0.2	0.59	0.4	1.58
8	"Shiv Part Two"	July 7, 2020	0.2	0.96	0.2	0.61	0.4	1.57
9	"Brainwave"	July 14, 2020	0.2	0.83	0.2	0.58	0.4	1.41
10	"Brainwave Jr."	July 21, 2020	0.2	0.77	0.1	0.31	0.3	1.08
11	"Shining Knight"	July 28, 2020	0.2	0.74	0.1	0.41	0.3	1.14
12	"Stars & S.T.R.I.P.E. Part One"	August 4, 2020	0.2	0.83	0.1	0.39	0.3	1.22
13	"Stars & S.T.R.I.P.E. Part Two"	August 11, 2020	0.2	0.86	0.2	0.48	0.4	1.34

==== Season 2 ====
Viewership and ratings per episode of Stargirl
No.	Title	Air date	Rating (18–49)	Viewers (millions)	DVR (18–49)	DVR viewers (millions)	Total (18–49)	Total viewers (millions)
1	"Summer School: Chapter One"	August 10, 2021	0.1	0.72	0.1	0.47	0.2	1.19
2	"Summer School: Chapter Two"	August 17, 2021	0.1	0.70	0.1	0.46	0.2	1.15
3	"Summer School: Chapter Three"	August 24, 2021	0.1	0.60	—N/a	—N/a	—N/a	—N/a
4	"Summer School: Chapter Four"	August 31, 2021	0.1	0.68	—N/a	—N/a	—N/a	—N/a
5	"Summer School: Chapter Five"	September 7, 2021	0.1	0.64	—N/a	—N/a	—N/a	—N/a
6	"Summer School: Chapter Six"	September 14, 2021	0.1	0.58	—N/a	—N/a	—N/a	—N/a
7	"Summer School: Chapter Seven"	September 21, 2021	0.1	0.58	—N/a	—N/a	—N/a	—N/a
8	"Summer School: Chapter Eight"	September 28, 2021	0.1	0.47	—N/a	—N/a	—N/a	—N/a
9	"Summer School: Chapter Nine"	October 5, 2021	0.1	0.47	—N/a	—N/a	—N/a	—N/a
10	"Summer School: Chapter Ten"	October 12, 2021	0.1	0.56	0.1	0.33	0.2	0.89
11	"Summer School: Chapter Eleven"	October 19, 2021	0.1	0.52	0.1	0.36	0.2	0.88
12	"Summer School: Chapter Twelve"	October 26, 2021	0.1	0.62	—N/a	—N/a	—N/a	—N/a
13	"Summer School: Chapter Thirteen"	November 2, 2021	0.1	0.57	—N/a	—N/a	—N/a	—N/a

==== Season 3 ====
Viewership and ratings per episode of Stargirl
No.	Title	Air date	Rating (18–49)	Viewers (millions)	DVR (18–49)	DVR viewers (millions)	Total (18–49)	Total viewers (millions)
1	"Frenemies – Chapter One: The Murder"	August 31, 2022	0.1	0.50	—N/a	—N/a	—N/a	—N/a
2	"Frenemies – Chapter Two: The Suspects"	September 7, 2022	0.1	0.49	—N/a	—N/a	—N/a	—N/a
3	"Frenemies – Chapter Three: The Blackmail"	September 14, 2022	0.1	0.51	0.0	0.27	0.1	0.78
4	"Frenemies – Chapter Four: The Evidence"	September 21, 2022	0.1	0.39	0.0	0.23	0.1	0.62
5	"Frenemies – Chapter Five: The Thief"	October 5, 2022	0.1	0.37	0.1	0.25	0.1	0.61
6	"Frenemies – Chapter Six: The Betrayal"	October 12, 2022	0.1	0.48	0.1	0.29	0.2	0.77
7	"Frenemies – Chapter Seven: Infinity Inc. Part One"	October 19, 2022	0.1	0.42	0.0	0.22	0.1	0.64
8	"Frenemies – Chapter Eight: Infinity Inc. Part Two"	October 26, 2022	0.1	0.50	0.0	0.22	0.1	0.72
9	"Frenemies – Chapter Nine: The Monsters"	November 2, 2022	0.1	0.44	0.0	0.18	0.1	0.62
10	"Frenemies – Chapter Ten: The Killer"	November 9, 2022	0.1	0.47	0.0	0.23	0.1	0.70
11	"Frenemies – Chapter Eleven: The Haunting"	November 16, 2022	0.1	0.49	0.0	0.22	0.1	0.71
12	"Frenemies – Chapter Twelve: The Last Will and Testament of Sylvester Pemberton"	November 30, 2022	0.1	0.44	—N/a	—N/a	—N/a	—N/a
13	"Frenemies - Chapter Thirteen: The Reckoning"	December 7, 2022	0.1	0.46	—N/a	—N/a	—N/a	—N/a

=== Critical response ===
On Rotten Tomatoes, the first season has an approval rating of 89% based on 38 reviews, with an average rating of 7.61/10. The website's critical consensus reads: "A stellar series perfect for anyone looking for a little hope, Stargirl is delightful fun the whole family can enjoy". On Metacritic it has a weighted average score of 68 out of 100 based on 8 reviews, indicating "generally favorable reviews".

Brian Lowry of CNN described the series as "hardly seeks to reinvent the wheel, or even expand the mold. Still, its mix of solid characters, clever writing and youthful exuberance casts a brighter light than most". Daniel Fienberg of The Hollywood Reporter gave a review, calling it "derivative, but should fill the superhero-origin-story-shaped hole in your heart" and wrote: "The result is that a show that is frequently derivative to the point of distraction might actually fill a need for viewers able to concentrate on its occasional charms until better superhero shows return".

On Rotten Tomatoes, the second season holds an approval rating of 100% based on 5 reviews, with an average rating of 8.2/10.

=== Awards and nominations ===
Award	Date of ceremony	Category	Nominee(s)	Result	Ref.
Saturn Awards	October 26, 2021	Best Superhero Adaptation Television Series	Stargirl	Won	
Saturn Awards	October 26, 2021	Best Supporting Actor on Television	Luke Wilson	Won	
Saturn Awards	October 26, 2021	Best Performance by a Younger Actor in a Television Series	Brec Bassinger	Won	
Saturn Awards	October 25, 2022	Best Fantasy Television Series: Network/Cable	Stargirl	Nominated	
Saturn Awards	October 25, 2022	Best Performance by a Younger Actor in a Network or Cable Television Series	Brec Bassinger	Won	
Saturn Awards	February 4, 2024	Best Superhero Television Series	Stargirl	Won	
Saturn Awards	February 4, 2024	Best Performance by a Younger Actor in a Television Series	Brec Bassinger	Nominated	

== Cancelled spin-off ==
After the series' cancellation, it was revealed that a spin-off revolving around Infinity Inc. was planned and that it would have followed the Shade, Jennie, and Todd searching for the other offspring of the original JSA members and help them with their potential abilities.

== Arrowverse ==
Stargirl and her team were briefly introduced in the Arrowverse crossover "Crisis on Infinite Earths" in January 2020, through archive footage from "The Justice Society" episode. Stargirl is set on a new Earth-2, created during the crossover. Stargirl from the pre-Crisis Earth-1 had previously appeared in three episodes of season two of Legends of Tomorrow, portrayed by Sarah Grey, between October 2016 and February 2017.

Regarding any proper crossovers with the Arrowverse, Johns and Bassinger were keen on the idea. Johns said that "right now the main concern is making sure that this show is great, that these characters are great, that they have their own stories and they get the proper screen time and the proper episodes to develop on their own. So hopefully in the future we can do something fun, but the first season is all about making sure that Stargirl is the best show it can possibly be". Bassinger added that there had already been preliminary discussion about crossing over with The Flash, and she was hopeful to be able to crossover with Melissa Benoist on Supergirl. John Wesley Shipp reprised his role as an alternate version of Jay Garrick from The Flash. Johns said Shipp's appearance helped connect "our universe directly with the other shows, and also shows that were part of a grander universe. It opens up the door to opportunities for us to eventually interact with those Arrowverse characters, and that was important".

Bassinger reprised the role of Stargirl in the ninth episode of the fourth season of the HBO Max series Titans, titled "Dude, Where's My Gar?"; that series exists on Earth-9 of the live action multiverse.
