= Brainwave (character) =

DC Comics characters

- Brainwave as depicted in Who's Who: The Definitive Directory of the DC Universe #3 (May 1985). Art by Jerry Ordway.

Publication information
- Publisher: DC Comics
- First appearance: All-Star Squadron #24 (August 1983)
- Created by: Roy Thomas; Jerry Ordway; Mike Machlan

In-story information
- Alter ego: Henry King Jr.
- Species: Metahuman
- Team affiliations: Infinity, Inc. Justice League
- Notable aliases: Brainwave Jr.
- Abilities: Telepathy: Illusion-casting; Creation of both auditory and visual hallucinations; Thought projection and manipulation; Mind/Mental/Psyche disintegration; Mind control and reading; Memory alteration and manipulation; Lie detection; Telekinesis: Telekinetic energy generation and control; Telekinetic pull and push; Telekinetic energy wave; Telekinetic burst; Telekinetic force-field/Shield projection; Telekinetic force control and manipulation; Telekinetic flight/levitation; Telekinetic crushing and destruction; Telekinetic strangulation

Brainwave or Brainwave Jr. (Henry King Jr.) is a character in the DC Comics Universe, who is commonly portrayed as a superhero and son of the supervillain, Brain Wave, along with primarily being a member of the Infinity, Inc.

Henry King Jr.'s version of Brainwave appeared in the first season of the DC Universe / The CW series Stargirl, portrayed by Jake Austin Walker.

== Publication history ==
Brainwave first appeared in All-Star Squadron #24 (1983) and was created by Roy Thomas, Jerry Ordway and Mike Machlan.

== Fictional character biography ==
Hank King Jr. is the son of Hank King Sr. and Merry Pemberton. As the second Brainwave, he is a founding member of Infinity, Inc., creating the group in an attempt to bring honor to his family name. During the run of Infinity, Inc. Brainwave developed a relationship with fellow team member Jade. When Hank's father dies, he passes on his mental powers to his son, greatly increasing his existing powers and causing him to become somewhat unhinged. As a result, he is placed in a mental institution that had been created specifically for him thanks to funding from Alan Scott.

Hank resurfaces as part of Black Adam's team, including Infinitors Northwind and Atom Smasher, helping to liberate Kahndaq. In an attempt to stop Hank, Hawkman has Ray Palmer shrink and enter Brainwave's body. Guided by Doctor Mid-Nite, Palmer intends to operate on King's brain, specifically the abnormal mass of nerve fibers believed to be the source of his powers. Palmer instead encounters Mister Mind, who has been the cause of Brainwave's mental instability. Palmer eventually gets past Mind and incapacitates Brainwave.

Hank and the other members of Infinity Inc. make a brief appearance in the Convergence storyline. Powerless and trapped on Telos, he continued his relationship with Jade, although they were estranged due to his alcoholism.

== Powers and abilities ==
Both King Sr. and Jr. have a variety of mental powers. King Sr. was originally much stronger, but upon his death, he somehow passed his powers on to his son, vastly increasing King Jr.'s power level.

Chief among their powers is telepathy. Both are able to dominate many minds at once and cause people to see illusions, or even have complete control over them. Proximity seems key to the effectiveness of this power, even though it had no defined range. King Jr. mentioned how even strong wills could not resist him when he was right next to them. While many telepaths filter out the thoughts of others, King Jr. allows the millions of minds he constantly comes across to flow freely through his mind.

Lesser-used powers of the Kings include telekinesis, the creation of realistic three-dimensional holograms, and the ability to fire blasts of psionic energy.

== Other versions ==
An alternate universe version of Brainwave from Earth-2 appears in Earth 2: World's End.

== In other media ==
- Brainwave, with elements of Brain Wave, appears in Young Justice: Outsiders as a member of Infinity, Inc.
- Henry King Jr. appears in Stargirl, portrayed by Jake Austin Walker. This version is a Blue Valley High student, football player, ex-boyfriend of Yolanda Montez, and boyfriend of Cindy Burman. After his father Henry King Sr. is hospitalized, Henry Jr. begins to visit him while he recuperates, during which the latter's powers begin to develop before fully manifesting after Cindy challenges Stargirl. After researching his powers and his father's work, Henry Jr. begins to share his father's views on humanity. Shortly after Stargirl tries to convince him otherwise in her civilian identity, Henry Jr. kills his father's lawyer for trying to have him taken off life support before Henry Sr. wakes up from his coma. Upon discovering Henry Sr. killed his mother to ensure his loyalty to the Injustice Society, Henry Jr. chooses to fight him and makes peace with Yolanda before sacrificing himself to save Stargirl's Justice Society.
- Brainwave appears as a character summon in Scribblenauts Unmasked: A DC Comics Adventure.
