= Unit 234 =

2024 film by Andy Tennant

- Theatrical release poster
- Directed by: Andy Tennant
- Written by: Derek Steiner
- Produced by: Blythe Frank; Hadeel Reda; Lee Dreyfuss; William Santor; Doug Murray
- Starring: Don Johnson; Isabelle Fuhrman; Jack Huston
- Cinematography: John Pardue
- Edited by: Piper Kroeze
- Music by: George Fenton
- Production companies: Productivity Media; Type Street Productions; Red A Entertainment; Round Larry Productions
- Distributed by: Brainstorm Media
- Release dates: September 30, 2024 (United Kingdom); May 9, 2025 (United States)
- Running time: 86 minutes
- Country: United States
- Language: English

Unit 234 (also known as Unit 234: The Lock Up) is a 2024 American action thriller film directed by Andy Tennant and written by Derek Steiner. It stars Don Johnson, Isabelle Fuhrman, and Jack Huston.

== Plot ==
At a remote construction site, businessman Jules Hansacker and his criminal associates await a delivery arranged through a man named Benny. Accompanied by his bodyguard and driver Leon, enforcer Doc, and brothers Dante and Carlos, Jules becomes suspicious when Benny arrives in an empty minivan and demands more money. Searching Benny's wallet, Jules discovers a business card for a self-storage facility, with a unit number and gate access code written on it. Convinced that the expected delivery has been hidden there, Jules has Benny killed. The gang drives to the facility but discovers that they lack the key needed to open the storage unit.

Laurie, a security guard at the storage facility, starts a night shift after cancelling a weekend trip to her long-distance boyfriend Jordan. She falls while fixing a leaking pipe and breaks her mobile phone. Jules arrives and pretends to have lost the key to the unit, but his identification doesn't match the photo in Laurie's database. Laurie orders him away, then checks the unit. Inside is a sedated man with a fresh surgery scar handcuffed to a gurney. He identifies himself as Clayton and claims Benny kidnapped him to harvest his organs.

The gang has meanwhile cut the electricity and phone lines to the facility. Laurie releases Clayton and is intercepted retrieving her truck keys from the office. She pepper-sprays Jules and Dante and runs, discovers the gang has flattened the tires on her truck. Clayton defends himself from Carlos, killing him. Laurie takes a truck stored in another unit and escapes from the facility, running over and killing Dante. Clayton disables Leon's car to avoid pursuit and follows. They encounter a police car, but Doc catches up with them in a stolen scooter and fatally shoots the officer. The pair are taken prisoner and returned to the facility in the patrol car, Laurie is locked in an empty unit, and Clayton is again handcuffed to the gurney.

When Jordan arrives unexpectedly to celebrate Laurie's birthday, Leon prevents Doc from shooting him by killing him. He knows out Jordan instead. Jules tortures Clayton, cutting off his fingers to obtain a confession about something. Laurie escapes, knocks out Jules, releases Clayton, then radios the police from the patrol car.

A satellite TV news feed running on an uninterruptible power supply in the office makes Laurie realize 'Clayton' is actually Philip Travis, a convicted mass murderer who killed Jules' daughter. He escaped custody from a hospital after kidney surgery with fellow inmate Benny's help.

'Clayton' kills Leon and corners Laurie at the gate of the facility, admitting he killed six people. Jules kills 'Clayton' with bolt cutters but is shot when the police arrive. As the police question Laurie, coroners remove Benny's body from the scene, revealing the key to the unit hidden in his shoe.

== Cast ==
- Isabelle Fuhrman as Laurie Saltair
- Don Johnson as Jules
- Jack Huston as Clayton
- James DuMont as Leon
- Christopher James Baker as Doc
- Manny Galan as Dante
- Juvian Marquez as Carlos
- Anirudh Pisharody as Jordan
- Rosemberg Salgado as Benny

== Production ==
Filming occurred in the Cayman Islands in April 2022. In May 2022, it was announced that Jack Huston joined the cast of the film.

== Release ==
It was released on digital platforms in the United Kingdom by Signature Entertainment on September 30, 2024. It was released in the United States by Brainstorm Media on May 9, 2025.

== Reception ==
On the review aggregator website Rotten Tomatoes, 62% of 13 critics' reviews are positive, with an average rating of 8.5/10.

Hannah Rose of CBR gave the film a rating of 6 out of 10, stating "It's not a classic, but at the very least Unit 234 shows just how much both its actors and its director are capable of, when given the chance."

Monique Jones of Common Sense Media gave the film positive feedback, writing "This is pretty standard, serviceable action-thriller fare."

An original score of B− was given by Brian Orndorf of Blu-ray.com, who wrote "Unit 234 actually makes its way to refreshingly dark final act, and the actors assembled mostly understand what’s required of them, getting the offering to moments of misery that are more compelling than the usual in chases and near-misses."
