= Butter (2020 film) =

2020 drama film directed by Paul A. Kaufman

- Official release poster
- Directed by: Paul A. Kaufman
- Written by: Paul A. Kaufman
- Based on: Butter by Erin Jade Lange
- Produced by: J. Todd Harris; Paul A. Kaufman; Christina Sibul
- Starring: Mira Sorvino; Mykelti Williamson; Brian Van Holt; Ravi Patel; Annabeth Gish; McKaley Miller; Alex Kersting
- Cinematography: Greg Gardiner
- Edited by: Garry M.B. Smith
- Music by: Jeff Toyne
- Production company: Power of Us Entertainment
- Distributed by: Blue Fox Entertainment
- Release dates: March 7, 2020 (Cinequest Film & Creativity Festival); February 25, 2022 (United States)
- Running time: 111 minutes
- Country: United States
- Language: English
- Budget: $1.75 million
- Box office: $114,036

Butter (also titled Butter's Final Meal) is a 2020 American comedy-drama film directed by Paul A. Kaufman and starring Mira Sorvino, Mykelti Williamson, Brian Van Holt, Ravi Patel, Annabeth Gish, McKaley Miller, and Alex Kersting. It is based on the novel of the same name by Erin Jade Lange.

The film was released on VOD and select theaters by Blue Fox Entertainment on February 25, 2022.

== Plot ==
A severely obese high schooler from Scottsdale, Arizona nicknamed "Butter" is becoming increasingly suicidal by the day. He got his nickname from being forced to eat a whole stick of butter by a bully named Jeremy Strong. Butter's only joys in life besides eating are playing the saxophone at a jazz club with his music teacher, Professor Dunn, and chatting online with his crush, Anna McGinn, while he poses as a stranger named "JP". Butter is an only child with an overprotective mother, Marian, a real estate agent who enables her son's unhealthy eating habits, while his father, Frank, is a former football captain, distant and disillusioned after a freak accident injured his eye.

At school, Butter's attempt to stop Jeremy from harassing Anna backfires, and receives many humiliating comments on the school blog. As December begins, Butter announces that he will stream himself eating to death on New Year's Day. This quickly makes him popular in school, and suggestions for his final menu begin piling up on his webpage. He also begins hanging out with two classmates, Trent and Parker, with whom he plans a list of fun activities before his final meal. Anna also grows closer to Butter, who reassures him that everyone thinks he is joking. As Butter's mental health and self-confidence improve, his appetite drops drastically.

Butter is invited to a party on New Year's Eve. After playing a song he wrote for Anna on stage, he reveals himself to be JP, angering her. As he tries to apologize, Anna slaps him. Butter punches Jeremy as he intervenes, prompting Anna to cut ties with Butter completely. At midnight, Butter resumes his original plan while everyone in the party watches his stream. To everyone's horror, Butter undergoes an anaphylactic shock upon eating strawberries — being knowingly allergic — and Anna calls emergency services.

Butter wakes up in the hospital a few days later, and apologizes to his family and Anna. Though sympathetic, Anna is still angry for his deception and clarifies that she was never interested in him romantically. In addition, she did not use a profile picture because she wanted to be accepted for her personality and not be judged for her appearance, which is also what Butter struggles with and ironically, what he did to her. Butter begins attending therapy, learning that what he went through was bullying all along, disguised as popularity. Still, Butter, his family, and his doctor are pleasantly surprised to learn that he has lost 50 lb (25 kg) in just two weeks. His parents grow closer to him and Marian ceases her enabling behavior by cooking healthier meals.

After Butter's release from the hospital, Anna comes to visit him one day and the two reconcile. He reveals to her that his real name is Marshall. They become friends again, but Butter has overcome his infatuation with Anna. When he returns to school, his classmates greet him warmly and call him by his real name. After a conversation with Professor Dunn, Butter looks forward to a successful future as a saxophonist.

== Cast ==
- Alex Kersting as Butter
- McKaley Miller as Anna McGinn
- Adain Bradley as Trent
- Jack Griffo as Parker
- Matthew Gold as Tucker Smith
- Mira Sorvino as Marian
- Mykelti Williamson as Professor Dunn
- Ravi Patel as Dr. Bean
- Annabeth Gish as Dr. Jennice
- Brian Van Holt as Frank
- Monte Markham as Dr. Kaufman
- Jake Austin Walker as Jeremy

== Release ==
Butter was released on VOD and select theaters by Blue Fox Entertainment on February 25, 2022. The film was screened at the Cinequest Film & Creativity Festival and the Socially Relevant Film Festival in 2020.

== Reception ==
=== Box office ===
In the United States and Canada, the film earned $73,937 from 308 theaters in its opening weekend.

=== Critical response ===
The film currently holds a 43% rating on Rotten Tomatoes based on 14 critical reviews.

John DeFore of The Hollywood Reporter gave the film a negative review and wrote, "While it may resonate for some young viewers, anyone whose reality really resembles that of the film's protagonist should probably look elsewhere."

Pat Padua of The Washington Post wrote a somewhat more favorable review. "'Butter' doesn’t have a fairy-tale ending, but it still feels a little pat in the end, and a few of the monologues sound like something out of a public service announcement. Ultimately, it is, like its conflicted hero, sweet and likable, and you wish it well."
