= Christopher James Baker =

Australian actor

- Other names: Chris Baker; Christopher Baker
- Occupation: Actor / Writer / Director
- Years active: 1994–present
- Notable work: True Detective; Ozark; Agents of S.H.I.E.L.D. Stargirl; Eden; Boy Swallows Universe
- Height: 6 ft 2 in (188 cm)

Christopher James Baker is an Australian actor known for his work as Henry King Sr. / Brainwave in the DC Universe series Stargirl.

== Early life ==
Baker grew up in Australia. Raised by parents Maggie Baker and John Baker. In his early life, he lived in the United Kingdom before returning to Australia. After finishing high school, Baker did some travelling before studying a three-year drama course in Sydney.

== Career ==
After graduating from his acting studies, Baker spent his early career working in theatre. He co-founded the stage company 'Urban Tales' together with other alumni from his acting course, and spent his early career performing more than 14 seasons of theatre works. He was also a member of Nick Enright's theatre company 'State of Play'.

He also played small parts in Australian and locally filmed American films, including comedy Kangaroo Jack (alongside Jerry O’Connell) and Ned Kelly (alongside Heath Ledger and Orlando Bloom) (both 2003), Hell Has Harbour Views and war film The Great Raid (alongside Benjamin Bratt and James Franco) (both 2005). Further films made while in Australia war film Kokoda (2006), action film The Condemned (2007), adventure film Nim's Island (alongside Jodie Foster and Gerard Butler in 2008) and action-thriller film Sanctum (2011).

After relocating to the United States, he initially featured in numerous Off-Broadway theatre roles, before landing the role of Cyril in the Warner Bros. television pilot Deliverance Creek in 2014. Shortly following, he scored the regular role of Blake Churchman, a secondary character in the second season of HBO's True Detective, playing the assistant of Vince Vaughn's character. He also had a recurring role in 2016 crime series Shades of Blue, alongside Jennifer Lopez. In 2019, Baker played Boyd Langmore in Netflix's hit series, Ozark (alongside Jason Bateman and Laura Linney), and Chronicom Hunter Malachi in Agents of S.H.I.E.L.D.. In 2020, he was cast as Brainwave in DC series Stargirl. Other television credits include Gotham, Bull, The Blacklist, The Good Cop, and The Rookie.

Baker's film credits while in America included Deliverance Creek (2014), Kieran Darcy-Smith's The Duel (alongside Liam Hemsworth and Woody Harrelson) and The Purge: Election Year (both 2016).

Since moving back to Australia, Baker has featured in Stan drama series Eden as Lou Gracie, and as an Irish immigrant Patrick Thomas in murder mystery miniseries New Gold Mountain (filmed back to back in 2021).

He returned to the US to film the fourth season of Ozark, the second season of Stargirl and the thriller film Unit 234 in the Cayman Islands.

Back in Australia, Baker starred as Ivan Kroll in Netflix miniseries Boy Swallows Universe, based on the semi-autobiographical novel by Brisbane author Trent Dalton (alongside Simon Baker, Travis Fimmel and Bryan Brown), and as Mitch Leeway in drama series Prosper (both 2024).

== Personal life ==
Baker moved to New York City in 2009 with his wife Hannah, to further his career. They have two children who were born in Manhattan.

In 2020, after eleven years in the States, Baker returned to Australia to live, to escape "the COVID situation" and because he wanted his kids to grow up in Australia.

== Filmography ==
=== Film ===
Year	Title	Role	Notes
1994	Army Intelligence (aka Renaissance Man)	Laundry Private #1	Feature film
2000	The Three Stooges	Clapper Boy (uncredited)	Feature film
2001	Serendipity	Lars Band #1	Feature film
2002	The Road from Coorain	Danny	TV movie
2003	Kangaroo Jack	Crumble	Feature film
2003	Ned Kelly	Kurnow	Feature film
2004	Magpie and the Pigeon: A Day in the Life of Superheroes	Magpie	Short film
2004	Ike: Countdown to D-Day	Group Captain Major James Stagg	TV movie
2005	Hell Has Harbour Views	Martin Cordell	TV movie
2005	The Great Raid	Monty	Feature film
2006	Kokoda	Blue	Feature film
2006	Vend	Vend	Short film
2006	Saturday Night Newtown, Sunday Morning Enmore		Short film
2006	The Game	John	Short film
2006	Sands of Time	Nicholai Torrez	Short film
2007	Bommie	Glenn	Short film
2007	The Condemned	Eddie C	Feature film
2008	Nim's Island	Ensign	Feature film
2008	Amours Filmez Equipage	Soundy	Short film
2008	1 and 0 nly	Frank James Morley	Feature film
2009	When a Muffin Knocks	Man	Short film
2011	Sanctum	J.D.	Feature film
2012	Focus	Jake	Short film
2014	Appropriate Behavior	Ted	Feature film
2015	Deliverance Creek	Cyril	TV movie
2015	Peter and John	Jake Rivers	Feature film
2016	The Duel	Monty	Feature film
2016	The Purge: Election Year	Harmon James	Feature film
2017	Keep Watching	The Creator	Feature film
2021	Blood Brothers	Jake	Feature film
2024	In Absence	Irwin	Short film
2024	Unit 234	Doc	Feature film
2026	Posthumous	Rohan	

=== Television ===
Year	Title	Role	Notes
2000	Law & Order: Special Victims Unit	Number Two	TV series, episode: "Closure"
2001	Changi	Lofty Morgan	TV miniseries, 4 episodes
2005	All Saints	Leo Boravoskas	TV series, season 8, episode 20: "In the Name of Love"
2008	The Abominable Flatmate	Bommie	TV micro-series
2009	The Road to Tropfest	Bruce Denahey	TV series
2009	Scariacs	Scientist #2	TV series
2009	My Place	Tippy	TV series, episode 4: "1978 Mike"
2014	Gotham	Raymond Earl / The Goat	TV series, episode 6: "Spirit of the Goat"
2015	True Detective	Blake Churchman	TV series, 7 episodes
2016	The Blacklist	Clayton	TV series, season 3, episode 2: "Marvin Gerard (No. 80)"
2016	Quarry	Eugene Linwood	TV series, 2 episodes
2017	Bull	Hayden Watkins	TV series, episode 21: "How to Dodge a Bullet"
2017; 2022	Ozark	Boyd Langmore	TV series, 8 episodes
2018	Shades of Blue	Theo Bennett	TV series, 7 episodes
2018	The Good Cop	Corey Speck	TV series, episode 2: "What is the Supermodel's Secret?"
2018–2019	The Rookie	Marcus Vance	TV series, 2 episodes
2019	Agents of S.H.I.E.L.D.	Malachi	TV series, season 6, 6 episodes
2020–2021	Stargirl	Henry King Sr. / Brainwave	TV series, season 1–2, 12 episodes
2021	Eden	Lou Gracie	TV miniseries, 7 episodes
2021	New Gold Mountain	Patrick Thomas	TV miniseries, 4 episodes
2022	Darby and Joan	Curtis	TV series, 2 episodes
2024	Boy Swallows Universe	Ivan Kroll	TV miniseries, 6 episodes
2024	Prosper	Mitch Leeway	TV series, 8 episodes

== Theatre ==
=== As actor ===
Year	Title	Role	Location / Co.
1999	Tumbling Dice		Studio 1B, Sydney
1999	Father's Day		Studio 1B, Sydney with Ferknerkle Productions
1999	Spurboard		Wharf Theatre, Sydney with STC & ATYP
2000	Summer of the Seventeenth Doll		Albury Performing Arts Centre with HotHouse Theatre, Railway St Theatre Company & Riverina Theatre Company
	Dreams of Clytemnestra	Agamemnon / Aegisthus	
	Othello	Roderigo	
	Friday Night Youth Group	Jesus	
	Iphigenia in Aulis	Achilles	
2004	Don't Stare Too Much	The Commitment Phobe	Darlinghurst Theatre, Sydney with White Rhino & Pell Mell Productions
2005	The Fire Raisers	Eisenring	Old Fitzroy Theatre, Sydney with Flyby Productions
2005	The Internationalist		Darlinghurst Theatre, Sydney with Practical Theatre Company
2006	Mademoiselle Fifi	Karl	Darlinghurst Theatre, Sydney with White Rhino
2007	Wilde Tales	Various roles	Australian regional tour with Critical Stages & State of Play
2024	White Rabbit, Red Rabbit		La Boite Theatre, Brisbane

=== As director ===
Year	Title	Role	Location / Co.
2007	Bangers and Mash	Director	Australian regional tour with Critical Stages & Civic Theatre
