= Merry Pemberton =

- Merry Pemberton as depicted in Young Justice: Sins of Youth #1 (May 2000). Art by Todd Nauck (penciller), Larry Stucker (inker), Jason Wright (colorist), and Ken Lopez (letterer).

Publication information
- Publisher: DC Comics
- First appearance: Merry Pemberton: Star-Spangled Comics #81 (June 1948); Gimmix: Seven Soldiers #0 (April 2005)
- Created by: Merry Pemberton: Otto Binder (writer), Win Mortimer (artist); Gimmix: Grant Morrison (writer), J.H. Williams III (artist)

In-story information
- Team affiliations: Old Justice; All-Star Squadron; Seven Soldiers of Victory
- Notable aliases: Gimmick Girl; Merry, Girl of 1000 Gimmicks
- Abilities: Carried various devices and gimmicks within her costume

Merry Pemberton, also known as Gimmick Girl and Merry, Girl of 1000 Gimmicks is a fictional character in the DC Comics Universe. She is the adoptive sister of Sylvester Pemberton. Merry Pemberton first appeared in Star-Spangled Comics #81 in June 1948, and ran through #90 (March 1949). She was created by writer Otto Binder.

== Fictional character biography ==
Born Merry Creamer, she is adopted by Mr. and Mrs. Sylvester Pemberton Sr., the parents of the original Star-Spangled Kid. She soon adopts a crime-fighting persona and works with her brother and Stripesy, ultimately supplanting them in their own feature.

According to Jess Nevins' Encyclopedia of Golden Age Superheroes, Merry "fights her male opposite, the Gimmick Guy; Presto, a criminal stage magician; and the Rope, who uses rope-themed gimmicks".

Merry eventually marries Henry King Sr., the supervillain known as the original Brain Wave. They had one son named Henry King Jr. who became the super-hero Brainwave, a member of Infinity Inc. which was founded by his uncle, Sylvester Pemberton Jr., the Star-Spangled Kid.

References to Merry before the Crisis on Infinite Earths note that she died at some point. However, she has since been revived and joined Old Justice, a team of former Golden Age sidekicks consisting of Dan the Dyna-Mite, Doiby Dickles, Neptune Perkins, Thorndyke Thompkins of the Minute Men of America, and the Cyclone Kids who feel modern teen heroes are risking themselves and others.

During the Sins of Youth event it is revealed that she particularly resents Stargirl, who at that time had taken her brother's title as the Star-Spangled Kid. Merry assists dozens of other superheroes, most of whom had changed ages, in battling Klarion the Witch Boy and other villains. Old Justice finds itself in the parental role of supervising many super-powered adolescents. She makes her peace with Stargirl, who has become an adult woman temporarily. During a multi-character battle in Alaska, Stargirl even saves Merry from Amazo. By the end of the story Merry has made her peace with both Stargirl and younger heroes in general.

After the JSA rescues her son from Black Adam and Mister Mind, Merry takes him back into her care.

=== Legacy ===
In Seven Soldiers #0, a new character named Gimmix appears. Credited as Jacqueline Pemberton, Merry's estranged daughter, Gimmix uses her Bag of Trix to do light hero work, mostly appearing at conventions talking about how she met up with better-known heroes such as Aquaman and Booster Gold. Some of her gimmicks are Zoom Glasses, anti-spider lipstick, "What Every Girl Needs" ice spray, and an unnamed gimmick that can turn water into wine. Jacqueline becomes part of an ill-fated team of six superheroes rounded up by Greg Saunders and is killed by the Sheeda, an advanced race which feeds on its own history to survive. Later on, Gimmix is shown attending group therapy for metahumans.

In 52, it is revealed that Jacqueline was the head of the Pemberton estate, and since her death has not been officially recorded, Lex Luthor purchases the estate for the trademarks of Skyman and Infinity Inc.

== Powers and abilities ==
Merry had no superpowers but wore a costume that contained various devices and gimmicks which she used as weapons.
