= Shattered Memories (film) =

2018 American thriller film

- Directed by: Chris Sivertson
- Written by: Chris Sivertson
- Produced by: John Hermann; Michael Moran
- Starring: Elizabeth Bogush
- Cinematography: Chris Heinrich
- Edited by: Anjoum Agrama
- Music by: Andrew Skrabutenas
- Production companies: Cut 4 Productions; MarVista Entertainment
- Release date: November 15, 2018
- Running time: 86 minutes
- Country: United States
- Language: English

Shattered Memories is a 2018 American thriller film written and directed by Chris Sivertson. It is also known as Last Night.

== Plot ==
Holly sees her former lover Ray at the 15th anniversary party for her friends Lyle and Lois. She is drugged by someone and wakes up the next morning next to Ray's dead body. She does not call 911 because she finds his blood on her hands. She must figure out what happened to prove her innocence.

== Cast ==
- Elizabeth Bogush as Holly
- Eddie Kaye Thomas as Tim
- Brad Schmidt as Ray
- Sarah Lind as Joanna
- Philip Boyd as Glenn
- Victoria Barabas as Lois
- Mark Famiglietti as Lyle
- Walker Borba as Adrien
- Jonathan Daviss as Teddy
- Meg DeLacy as Clara
- Stephanie Bast as April

== Reception ==
Trevor Wells gave the film a positive review of 8 out of 10 cowboy hats, calling it "a well-acted and excellently constructed mystery, making for an enjoyable viewing experience for any mystery buff."

David Duprey of thatmomentin.com wrote, "The actors commit with all kinds of syrup, and there's no getting around that the longer it lasts, the better the entanglements become."

The British review site The Movie Scene gave the film a negative review of 2 out of 5 stars, calling it an "imperfect picture" that "has an almost soap opera quality".
