= Wildcat (Yolanda Montez) =

Publication information
- Publisher: DC Comics
- First appearance: Infinity, Inc. #12 (March 1985)
- Created by: Roy Thomas; Dann Thomas; Don Newton

In-story information
- Alter ego: Yolanda Montez
- Species: Metahuman
- Team affiliations: Infinity Inc. Shadow Fighters; Justice Society of America
- Abilities: Retractable claws Cat-like agility and reflexes

Wildcat (Yolanda Montez) is a fictional superheroine in DC Comics' shared universe, the DC universe. She first appeared in Infinity, Inc. #12 (March 1985), and was created by Roy Thomas, Dann Thomas, and Don Newton.

Yolanda Montez was the second Latina superhero, after Green Fury. The character appeared in the television series Stargirl, portrayed by Yvette Monreal.

== Publication history ==
La Garro appearing alongside the founding Infinitors.

Roy and Dann Thomas originally intended to create a Canadian superheroine named "The Lynx" for new 1980s-era descendants of the All-Star Squadron. An early incarnation of Wildcat named "La Garro" appears in promotional material for Infinity Inc.

== Fictional character biography ==
Yolanda Montez is the daughter of Maria Montez and Juan Montez, and possesses cat-like abilities due to Maria being exposed to experimental drugs while pregnant. She later succeeds her godfather Ted Grant as Wildcat following his retirement. During this time, she joins Infinity, Inc. and has a flirtatious relationship with Nuklon.

Yolanda later retires after Infinity, Inc. disbands, but resurfaces to fight Eclipso, during which she is killed. Years later, Wildcat is resurrected in Doomsday Clock and joins the Justice Society of America.

== Powers and abilities ==
Wildcat is a metahuman who possesses cat-like agility and claws.

== Other versions ==
An alternate universe variant of Yolanda Montez / Wildcat from Earth-2 appears in Earth 2: World's End and Convergence. This version is the demonic avatar of the Red, a cosmic force connecting animal life.

== In other media ==
Yolanda Montez appears in Stargirl, portrayed by Yvette Monreal. This version is a high school student, a fan of Ted Grant and the ex-girlfriend of Henry King Jr. Three months prior to the series, she became an outcast when her rival, Cindy Burman had leaked revealing photos she had sent to Henry during a school presidential election to ruin her candidacy, which also resulted in her parents revealing their true discussing natures, as they had started to treat Yolanda quite badly for no clear reason at all and had led to her pouring her frustrations into boxing. Yolanda later takes up Grant's identity of Wildcat at Stargirl's request to help rebuild the Justice Society of America (JSA). Yolanda would later go on to forgive Henry before he is killed by his father, Brainwave and avenge him by killing the latter. In the second season, Yolanda becomes a part-time waitress, but suffers from PTSD as a result of her killing Brainwave. This eventually leads her to quit the JSA after suffering hallucinations of Henry and Brainwave, although she later agrees to return to help her friends defeat Eclipso. In the third season, Yolanda moves in with Stargirl's family, as she was finally tired of being constantly abused, disrespected and mistreated by her parents, particularly by her mother, Maria. At the end of the third season, Richard Swift has indirectly implied that Yolanda had ultimately decided to press charges for child abuse against both of her parents, after coming to terms with their true natures, but she also kept her membership in the Justice Society of America and her secret identity as Wildcat hidden from them. Ten years later, she's still a member of the JSA.

- Ahead of the series' premiere, Yolanda and the JSA made a cameo appearance in the Arrowverse crossover "Crisis on Infinite Earths" via archive footage from the Stargirl episode "The Justice Society".
