= Doctor Mid-Nite =

DC Comics superhero

- Incarnations of Doctor Mid-Nite. From left to right: Charles McNider, Pieter Cross, and Beth Chapel.

Publication information
- Publisher: DC Comics
- First appearance: All-American Comics #25 (April 1941)
- Created by: Charles Reizenstein; Stanley Josephs Aschmeier

In-story information
- Alter ego: Charles M. McNider / Beth Chapel / Pieter Anton Cross
- Team affiliations: All-Star Clinic; All-Star Squadron; Justice Society of America; Infinity Inc.
- Abilities: Each version of the character possess similar powers which includes: Night vision; Expert in medical science, medicine, and hand-to-hand combat

Doctor Mid-Nite (or Doctor Midnight) is the name of several superheroes published in American comic books by DC Comics. With the original version debuting in All-American Comics #25 (April 1941) and created by writer Charles Reizenstein and artist Stanley Josephs Aschmeier, several other variations of the character was created overtime. As members of the Justice Society of America, the characters are blind legacy heroes with similar powers and origins, serving as premier physicians to various affiliated teams and superheroes in the DC Universe.

The original version, Dr. Charles McNider, was an American surgeon blinded in an accident when operating on a patient targeted by a mobster. Discovering he could see in total darkness, he created modified goggles to regain some sight and became a superhero, particularly with the Justice Society of America and All-Star Squadron. Over time, McNider trained two successors and would be killed off by the villain, Extant. McNider's first protege, African-American Dr. Beth Chapel, would become his successor after a similar accident and gained the same powers, inspired by her mentor. She served as both Infinity, Inc. and the Justice Society of America's physician and scientific expert until she was killed by Eclipso. Chapel was later resurrected and resumed her service. Dr. Pieter Cross, a Norwegian medical prodigy, was similarly mentored by McNider and suffered from a similar accident while privately investigating a drug derived from the Venom substance used by Bane. Gaining similar powers, he used his vast wealth and skills to become a vigilante and later lent his abilities as a physician to the Justice Society and superheroes alike, opening up his own clinic ("All-Stars Clinic") and once mentored the third Blue Beetle, Jaime Reyes. Following Chapel's resurrection, she and Cross concurrently act as Doctor Mite-Nite.

One of the earliest examples of a disabled superhero, Doctor Mid-Nite has simultaneously been praised as being one of comic book's positive examples of portrayal of physicians and garnered concerns over representational challenges in regards to the Beth Chapel incarnation. The character has also appeared in several media adaptations, most notably with the Charles McNider version making his live action debut in the second season of Legends of Tomorrow played by Kwesi Ameyaw. McNider also appears in Stargirl, portrayed by Henry Thomas in season one and Alex Collins in season two. Beth Chapel also appears in the series, portrayed by Anjelika Washington.

== Publication history ==
The original version of the character debuted in All-American Comics #25 (April 1941), created by Charles Reizenstein and Stanley Aschmeier.

== Characterization ==
While each Doctor Mid-Nite have different backgrounds, the characters are legacy superheroes who coincidentally have an uncanny history of being physicians blinded in a tragic accident but gained metahuman powers to see in total darkness, serving as premier medical physicians and scientific specialists to various super-heroes and supehero-based teams in the DC Universe.

=== Fictional character biography ===
==== Charles McNider ====
Once a surgeon, Charles McNider was enlisted to perform surgery on a witness set to testify against mobster Killer Maroni. During the surgery, Maroni throws a grenade into the room, killing the witness and blinding McNider, who survived. Although his career as a conventional physician ends and he becomes a magazine writer who exposes criminals, he discovers he can only see in darkness. Developing special visors to aid him, he becomes the superhero known as "Doctor Mid-Nite". He later joins the Justice Society of America (JSA) and the All-Star Squadron; in 1942, McNider enlists in the U.S. Medical Corps as a physician during World War II, rising to the rank of captain. McNider briefly assumes the role of Starman when the original Starman, Ted Knight, has a nervous breakdown and the JSA disbands. In 1953, McNider's lover Myra Mason is murdered by the Shadower, a foe who had learned Doctor Mid-Nite's secret identity. McNider later rescues a pregnant woman from attack in Sogndal, Norway and delivers her baby, Pieter Cross (the future Doctor Mid-Nite). McNider is among the JSA members who are captured and placed in suspended animation by Vandal Savage before being freed by the Flash. During the storyline Zero Hour: Crisis in Time!, McNider is killed by Extant.

==== Beth Chapel ====
A native of Orangeburg, South Carolina whose parents are passionate, Christian church pastor and choir singer respectively and raised alongside four brothers, Beth Chapel eventually becomes a medical physician mentored by McNider in his later years as one of his two best students. When Chapel is blinded in an oxygen explosion but is rescued by Hourman's son Rick Tyler, she is operated on by McNider. Unable to restore her ordinary vision, he manages to allow her to see in complete darkness like him. After being released and contemplating her next goals, she dons the Doctor Mid-Nite codename and costume. Along with a new Wildcat, Chapel and Tyler apply for membership in Infinity, Inc, eventually gaining admission; however, the association was short-lived, as Infinity, Inc. disbanded shortly thereafter, though Chapel and Tyler had a romantic relationship during their tenure. Doctor Midnight and Wildcat are subsequently recruited by the U.S. government for a mission to defeat the supervillain Eclipso, only for Chapel to die on the mission along with Wildcat, Creeper, Commander Steel, Peacemaker, and Major Victory.

Eventually, Beth is revived due to the precursor the Lazarus eruption returning her to life alongside Wildcat. She aids in operating the All-Star Clinic. She also served on the Justice Society of America once again, first helping the team battle Per Degaton while reluctantly helping Yolanda Montez stave off Eclipso's possession in secret, preferring to ask Doctor Fate and the team for aid. Once Eclipso emerged, he is defeated swiftly by time-displaced Huntress and a younger version of Mordru. She is also present to help the Justice Society battle a new iteration of the Injustice Society, who sows discord in the team internally and is captured. Beth takes a hiatus from the team to help Pieter Cross in the All-Star Clinic.

==== Pieter Cross ====
A Norwegian-born physician, Pieter Anton Cross is a medical prodigy with great respect for the original Doctor Mid-Nite, who saved his mother and delivered him as an infant. Differing from his predecessors, the character's connections and wealth helps provides healthcare to those outside typical medical circles and those whom unorthodox medicine has failed, has his own medical team to assist him, and runs the All-Star Clinic. Cross is also a devout Christian. During his appearance from the 1999 JSA series until at least 2008, the character was remarked to be in his thirties at the timeframe. As an adult, Cross is unable to save his mother from Chagas disease, which she catches in Brazil while visiting him.

Cross's crime-fighting career begins as he runs a free clinic in Portsmouth, Washington. His work leads him to investigate a new street drug called A39, an accidental derivative of the steroid-like Venom. The drug, he soon learns, is produced by an evil corporation named Praeda Industries, run by the Terrible Trio. Cross is drugged by company enforcers and soon involved in a car accident. After the accident, he finds that he can only see in pitch darkness. Stripped of his license to officially practice medicine, Cross takes the name Doctor Mid-Nite and resolves to fight crime. Cross joins the newest incarnation of the Justice Society of America, and has a brief romance with teammate Black Canary.

Cross is usually portrayed as being a physician first and vigilante second, setting up a clinic to help him treat patients who cannot afford conventional health care. Scanners in his cowl-lenses identify health risks as well as threats. He is a vegetarian and practices yoga (JSA). Cross carries high-tech medical equipment in addition to weapons (including blackout bombs). Some individuals whom Cross assists eventually come to aid him in his work as both crime fighter and community surgeon. Allies gained in this way include reformed street kids Nite Lite and Ice Sickle, and writer Camilla Marlowe. Mid-Nite also serves as a mentor to Jaime Reyes, the third Blue Beetle.

The Justice Society encounters Gog, who restores Cross's vision. Although initially a blessing, this works to Cross's disadvantage in the field, as he has lost his infrared vision and can no longer see through his own dark bombs. Eventually, the JSA mounts an all-out assault on Gog, having learned from Sandman that Gog is rooting himself into the Earth. Gog punishes them by taking away his blessings, including Cross's sight.

=== Powers and abilities ===
All three version possess powers of night vision, have knowledge in medicine and medical science, and have keen, scientific minds. In addition to those attributes, McNider is also a skilled author and athlete who kept himself condition even into his sixties. Similarly, Chapel possess unusual strength and is an expert fighter, later trained by the original Wildcat. Cross is uniquely knowledgeable in other scientific fields such as physics, robotics, chemistry, and infrared astronomy, specializes in limb grafting, and has wealth and a network of contacts to provide healthcare to patients with conditions beyond orthodox medicine.

All versions of the character also share gadgetry such as blackout bombs, in which can be used to blind enemies in darkness and allow them to see. Their costumes often includes specialized googles with "ultrasonic" lenses, allowing them to see during the day. Chapel's muted color scheme allows her to better blend into the shadows and her goggles allows her to see other wavelengths in the electromagnetic spectrum, including ultraviolet and infrared. Cross has an improved variant of blackout bombs, his own home, laboratory, and a clinic that assists with his vigilante and physician work. McNider and Cross both also have a trained owl to allow access to otherwise inaccessible places.

== Supporting casts ==
In the Doctor Mid-Nite limited series starring Pieter Cross, the character is assisted by a team; Nite-Lite and Ice Sickle acts as medical assistants and nurse role to Doctor Mid-Nite, helping him later run the All-Star Clinic in Portsmouth City. He is also assisted by Calmilla Marlowe.

=== Enemies ===
- "Gallows" Gallagher - A gangster who had his brother take his place in prison with help from a corrupt prison warden.
- "Hands" Hannigan - A gangster who wanted to take advantage of Regis Morgan's telescopic vision and make him a lookout for his gang.
- "Killer" Maroni - A gangster who was responsible for the grenade that blinded Charles McNider and became Doctor Mid-Nite's first opponent.
- Banshee -
- Big Mouth - The leader of a gang who worked with Jasper to set up hallucinations to frighten Jasper's aunt Martha Yates and his uncle Ambrose Yates.
- Doctor Light - A villain who uses light technology.
- Dr. Gamwell - A man who used a home for the blind as a front for his criminal activities.
- Fisherman - Kurt Hartmann is a fisherman-themed criminal.
- Hans - A Nazi demolition diver.
- Herman Gherkin - A Nazi general.
- Ice Ingram -
- King Cobra - A hooded gangster.
- Madame Zara - A criminal who operated as a psychic.
- Malcolm Mumm - An inventor who invented a sound-nullifying device and operated as the self-proclaimed Master of Silence. He used his invention to cover up the sounds related to his bank vault robberies.
- Mister Nitro -
- Slim - A mobster who planned to sabotage the games of the Yellow Jackets football team.
- Tarantula - A crime lord whose minion Logger suspected that Charles McNider and Doctor Mid-Nite are the same people.
- Terrible Trio - The members in the aliases of Fisk, Shackley, and Volper run Praeda Industries.

== Cultural impact ==
Notably one of the first superhero to appear with a disability, the character has been a subject of scholarly and critical analysis; In a 2018 study examining the portrayal of physicians and medical practice in comic books, comic strips, and graphic novels, Carol Tilley, Ph.D., considered Doctor Mid-Nite as an example of "the beneficence and technical facilities of early comic book physicians" and examined both the Charles McNider and Beth Chapel versions; In tandem with McNider's portrayal, the study concluded that popular media shifted portrayal of physicians from eccentric or questionable figures to being skilled, benevolent, and authoritative professionals, highlighting increasing professionalization and technologizing in the early 20th century within the medicine industry. Separately, the study also considered representational challenges and noted Beth Chapel as one of the few, non-white, heteronormative male practitioners and believed it to be essential for comics to reflect greater ethnic, racial, and gender diversity, especially for titles emphasizing health care and medicine.

== Other versions ==
- Nite-Lite is one of Pieter Cross's African-American assistants and nurse whom became indebted to him after saving his life from a deal gone bad. Possessing a level of extensive medical knowledge and combat abilities in which is exemplified by his use of brass knuckles, he often assists Doctor Mid-Nite both as a superhero and in maintaining his clinic whenever he is away. His backgrounds hints at a rough and abusive lifestyle in his youth.
- Another assistant, nicknamed Ice Sickle (and Mid-Nite Junior), is a college student who dropped out to hunt for his older brother's drug dealer, who is responsible for his overdose. Promising to help him find the dealer, he briefly takes him in as a protege to teach him skills necessary to be a surgeon while helping him run All-Star Clinic when Mid-Nite is away. Like Nite-Lite, he is also African-American but possesses surgical skills. He is unceremoniously killed by Spirit King sometime after Cross joins the Justice Society.
- In 1965, DC Comics had no plans to revive Doctor Mid-Nite. DC editor Julius Schwartz gave M.I.T. student and comic book letterhack Rick Norwood permission to publish a Dr. Midnite story in his fanzine, Five. The story written by Norwood and illustrated by Steve Sabo features a doctor named Tom Benson who is blinded in battle. He discovers that his other senses are super-sensitive and dons the Doctor Midnite costume to fight crime.
- Another version of the character was shown in JSA: The Liberty File as a World War II United States intelligence agent code-named the Owl. This character, though a playboy, resembles other Doctor Mid-Nite representations. Though derided for his dalliances with the ladies, McNider was trusted as a valued field operative.
- Batman: Holy Terror depicts an America ruled by a religious theocracy as a result of Oliver Cromwell living for a decade longer than he did in reality. McNider was a member of the underground resistance against the government years ago, working alongside Thomas Wayne, but they were discovered, with Thomas and his wife being killed while McNider was blinded and his own wife executed. McNider offers some advice to Thomas's son Bruce when he discovers the truth about his parents' deaths, leading Bruce on the path to begin his own resistance against the government.
- In the Tangent: Superman's Reign series, a version of Doctor Mid-Nite is briefly seen.
- In the new Earth-2 created in the wake of Infinite Crisis and 52, Beth Chapel is a member of the Justice Society Infinity.

== Collected editions ==
Title	Material collected	Writers/Pencillers	ISBN
JSA All-Stars Archives Vol. 1 HC (2007)	All-American Comics (1939) #25-29		
Doctor Mid-Nite (2000)	Doctor Mid-Nite #1-3	Matt Wagner, John K. Snyder III	ISBN 1-56389-607-9

== In other media ==
=== Television ===
- The Charles McNider incarnation of Doctor Mid-Nite appears in a painting depicted in the Smallville two-part episode "Absolute Justice".
- The Charles McNider incarnation of Doctor Mid-Nite makes non-speaking appearances in Justice League Unlimited as a member of the Justice League.
- The Charles McNider incarnation of Doctor Mid-Nite appears in Batman: The Brave and the Bold, voiced by Corey Burton.
- The Charles McNider incarnation of Doctor Mid-Nite appears in the Mad segment "That's What Super Friends Are For", voiced by Kevin Shinick.
- Pieter Cross appears in Young Justice, voiced by Bruce Greenwood.
- The Charles McNider incarnation of Doctor Mid-Nite appears in the second season of the Arrowverse series Legends of Tomorrow, portrayed by Kwesi Ameyaw.
- The Charles McNider and Beth Chapel incarnations of Doctor Mid-Nite appear in Stargirl, portrayed by Henry Thomas (season one) and Alex Collins (season two) and Anjelika Washington respectively. The latter takes up the mantle after the former is seemingly killed in battle against the Injustice Society.
  - Ahead of the series' premiere, Chapel made a cameo appearance in the Arrowverse crossover event "Crisis on Infinite Earths".

=== Film ===
- The Charles McNider incarnation of Doctor Mid-Nite makes a cameo appearance in the opening credits of Justice League: The New Frontier as a member of the Justice Society of America.
- The Charles McNider and Beth Chapel incarnations of Doctor Mid-Nite appears in Justice League: Crisis on Infinite Earths, with the latter voiced by Cynthia McWilliams.

=== Merchandise ===
- The Charles McNider incarnation of Doctor Mid-Nite and Hooty received an action figure in wave twelve of the DC Universe Classics line.
- The Charles McNider incarnation of Doctor Mid-Nite and Hooty received an action figure from DC Direct in 2001.
- The Charles McNider incarnation of Doctor Mid-Nite and Hooty received action figures in Mattel's Justice League Unlimited toy line in November 2011.
