= Meg DeLacy =

American actress and singer

- Born: 9 July 1996 (age 30); Los Angeles, California
- Occupations: Singer; songwriter; actress
- Years active: 2012–present

Meg DeLacy is an American actress and singer. She is known for her role as Cindy Burman in the DC Universe series Stargirl.

== Early life ==
DeLacy was born and raised in Southern California. Her mother is Filipina.

== Career ==
DeLacy began her acting career in 2012, when she started creating music at the age of 8 before picking up a guitar when she was 12 years old. DeLacy has her own YouTube channel. In 2012, DeLacy made her feature film debut in the South Korean comedy-drama film Papa, in which she played the role of Maya. From 2013 to 2015, DeLacy was cast to play the lead role in the web series Side Effects portraying Whitney Connolly. In 2016, DeLacy had a recurring role in the teen drama series Recovery Road, playing Nyla.

In 2017, DeLacy appeared as Candy in the comedy film Austin Found directed by Will Raee, which was released on July 7, 2017. On the same year, DeLacy was cast in the teen comedy film by Benny Fine titled F the Prom. Also the same year, DeLacy had a recurring role in the drama web series in Zac & Mia portraying Chloe. She played the role as Grace on The Fosters from 2017 to 2018, where she held a recurring role. For her role in Woodstock or Bust, DeLacy was nominated in 2019 for Best Supporting Actress by the Lady Filmmakers Film Festival. She appeared as Clara in Chris Sivertson's thriller film Shattered Memories.

In early 2020, DeLacy won the Best Ensemble in 2020 Independent Shorts Awards and also won the Best Actress in 2020 Fright Night Film Festival, for the short film Scars, where she held a lead role.

From 2020 to 2022, DeLacy starred as the villainous Cindy Burman in Stargirl.

== Filmography ==
=== Film ===
Year	Title	Role	Notes
2012	Papa	Maya	
2014	The Blackout	Christine	
2017	North of Neon	Coin	Short Film
2017	Austin Found	Candy	
2017	F the Prom	Felicity "City" Stufts	
2018	Woodstock or Bust	Meryl	
2018	Shattered Memories	Clara	
2020	Scars	Aris	Short Film
2020	Rose	Rose	Short Film

=== Television ===
Year	Title	Role	Notes
2015	See Dad Run	Juliette	Episode: "See Dad Runner Up"
2016	Recovery Road	Nyla	Recurring
2017	Chicago P.D.	Tonya Whitley	Episode: "I Remember Her Now"
2017	Zac and Mia	Chloe	Recurring
2017-2018	The Fosters	Grace Mullen	Recurring
2019	Santa Clarita Diet	Margot	Episode: "Knighttime"
2020-2024	The Rookie	Chastity	Recurring
2020–2022	Stargirl	Cindy Burman	Main Role
2020	Find a Way or Make One	Charlie	Episode: "Aut Viam Invenniam Aut Faciam"
2024	The Irrational	Summer	Episode: (S2 E5) "Anatomy of a Fall"
2026	Shrinking	Peyton	Episode: (S3 E10) "The Bodyguard of Sadness"

Web series roles
Year	Title	Role	Notes
2013–2015	Side Effects	Whitney Connolly	Lead role
2016	The Disappearing Girl	Carla	

== Discography ==
=== Singles ===
Title	Year	Album
"Bruises"	2018	TBA
"Red Wine"	2018	TBA
"Trapeze"	2018	TBA
"Some and All of It"	2020	TBA
"67"	2020	TBA
"Implicit"	2020	TBA
"Body"	2021	TBA
"Love Me Like That"	2021	TBA

=== Promotional singles ===
Title	Year	Album
"You Stole My Heart"	2012	Non-album singles
"Through"	2012	Non-album singles
"We're Alive"	2012	Non-album singles
"No Diggity"	2013	Non-album singles
"Warm Water (Live)"	2015	Non-album singles
"Girls Just Want to Have Fun (Live)"	2015	Non-album singles
"I'm No Good (Live)"	2015	Non-album singles
"Drinking and Driving (Live)"	2015	Non-album singles
"Never Know" (featuring Daoudi)	2017	Non-album singles

=== Guest appearances ===
List of non-single guest appearances, with other performing artists, showing year released and album name
Title	Year	Other artist(s)	Album
"Titanium"	2013	None	Side Effects: The Music, Episode 1 (Music From the Web Series)
"Sweet Little Pill"	2013	Chester See, Lulu Antariksa, Cade Canon Ball, Finn Roberts	Side Effects: The Music, Episode 1 (Music From the Web Series)
"C'mon"	2013	Lulu Antariksa	Side Effects: The Music, Episode 1 (Music From the Web Series)
"Mean"	2013	Lia Marie Johnson	Side Effects: The Music, Episode 1 (Music From the Web Series)
"Bad Day"	2013	Chester See, Lulu Antariksa, Cade Canon Ball, Finn Roberts	Side Effects: The Music, Episode 1 (Music From the Web Series)
"Cups"	2014	Lulu Antariksa, Cade Canon Ball, Keli Price, Finn Roberts, Chester See	Side Effects: The Music, Episode 2 (Music From the Web Series)
"Safe and Sound"	2014	Cade Canon Ball	Side Effects: The Music, Episode 2 (Music From the Web Series)
"Kiss You"	2014	Finn Roberts, Chester See	Side Effects: The Music, Episode 2 (Music From the Web Series)
"Boom Boom"	2014	Lulu Antariksa	Side Effects: The Music, Episode 2 (Music From the Web Series)
"Euphoria"	2017	Austin Powell	Ink (EP)
"Suffragette"	2018	Liquid Heart, David Lambert	non-album single

=== Music Videos ===
Title	Year	Director
"Through"	2012	Christine Crokos
"We're Alive"	2012	William Sikora III
"Bruises	2018	Keenan O'Reilly
"Some and All of It"	2020	Unknown
"Implicit"	2020	Unknown
"Body"	2021	Jake Matthews

=== Guest appearances ===
Title	Year	Artist(s)	Director(s)
"Almost True"	2020	KTJ & Carly	KTJ & Carly

== Awards and nominations ==
Year	Award	Category	Work	Result	Ref.
2019	Lady Filmmakers Film Festival	Best Supporting Actress in a feature film	Woodstock or Bust	Nominated	
2020	Fright Night Film Festival	Best Actress	Scars	Won	
2020	Independent Shorts Awards	Best Ensemble	Scars	Won	
