= Yvette Monreal =

American actress

- Occupation: Actress
- Years active: 2013–present

Yvette Monreal is an American actress. Her television appearances have included roles in Matador (2014), Faking It (2014), and as Yolanda Montez / Wildcat in Stargirl (2020). She also appears in the action film Rambo: Last Blood as John Rambo's caretaker's granddaughter.

== Early life ==
Monreal grew up in Lawndale, California. She became interested in acting after taking drama classes in high school. She feels that her mother inspired her to make this decision. Monreal is of half Chilean and half Mexican descent. As a child, she had enjoyed Halle Berry playing Catwoman and wanted to be like her. She has said her upbringing was "very Catholic".

== Filmography ==
=== Film ===
Year	Title	Role	Notes
2014	Casey	Casey	Short
2016	Lowriders	Claudia	
2018	Once Upon a Superhero	Frankie	
2018	Monsoon	Caitlyn	
2019	Rambo: Last Blood	Gabriela Beltran	

=== Television ===
Year	Title	Role	Notes
2013	Harpies	Temperance	2 ep.
2013	Chutes & Ladders	Olivia	9 episodes
2014	Awkward	Girl	1 episode
2014–15	Faking It	Reagan	10 episodes
2014	Matador	Senna Galan	8 episodes
2015-2017	The Fosters	Adriana	4 episodes
2018	NCIS	Maya Guzman	1 ep.
2020	Legends of Tomorrow	Yolanda Montez / Wildcat	Cameo, "Crisis on Infinite Earths, Part 5"
2020–2022	Stargirl	Yolanda Montez / Wildcat	Main cast

== Accolades ==
Year	Award	Category	Work	Result	Ref.
2019	National Film & TV Awards	Best Supporting Actress	Rambo: Last Blood	Won	
