= Faceless Hunters =

Group of DC Comics supervillains

- The Chun Yull incarnation of the Faceless Hunter as depicted in Green Lantern vol. 4 #15 (November 2006). Art by Ethan Van Sciver (penciller), Oclair Albert (inker), and Moose Baumann (colorist).

Publication information
- Publisher: DC Comics
- First appearance: Strange Adventures #124 (January 1961)
- Created by: Gardner Fox (writer); Mike Sekowsky (artist)

Characteristics
- Place of origin: Klaramar
- Notable members: Chun Yull
- Inherent abilities: Size alteration; Superhuman strength, stamina, and senses; Telepathy; Absorbing replication; Flight

The Faceless Hunters are a race of alien supervillains in the DC Comics universe that first appeared in Strange Adventures #124 (January 1961). They were created by Gardner Fox and Mike Sekowsky. The Faceless Hunters hail from Klaramar (the word Klar-a-mar breaks down into "clear of imperfection": Klar is the German language term for "clear", and "mar" can mean either blemish or imperfection).

== Publication history ==
The Faceless Hunters made three appearances in DC Comics flagship science fiction anthology title, all written by Gardner Fox - Strange Adventures, in issues #124 (January 1961) with artists Mike Sekowsky and Murphy Anderson, #142 (July 1962) with art by Carmine Infantino and Murphy Anderson, and #153 (June 1963), with art by Gil Kane and Sid Greene. All three stories also featured on the covers of those issues, with art by Murphy Anderson.

Since then they have made few appearances in the DC Universe: as one of 'The Forgotten Villains' in DC Comics Presents #77-78 (January - February 1985), written by Marv Wolfman and drawn by Curt Swan and Dave Hunt, briefly in Resurrection Man #25 (February 1999) and Young Justice #50 (December 2002), in Green Lantern (vol. 5) #12 (July 2006) and #15-16 (December 2006 - January 2007), written by Geoff Johns, and Superman: World of New Krypton #9 (November 2009).

== Fictional character biography ==
=== Strange Adventures ===
Strange Adventures #142, artist Murphy Anderson.

The Faceless Hunters first come to public attention in 1961 after one of them, Klee Pan, is intercepted trying to steal major world sculptures such as the Mount Rushmore heads and the Easter Island statues. Oregon Highway Patrolmen Bob Colby and Jim Boone are assigned to Mount Rushmore and confront Klee Pan, who explains that he comes from Klaramar - a world revolving within an atom on the planet Saturn and he is looking for a stone face left on Earth millennia ago which will prevent Saturn from exploding. He reveals that an evil Faceless Hunter, Chun Yull, planted a time-bomb on Earth and threatened to detonate it unless he was made supreme ruler, but died giving no clues as to where the face, which can defuse the bomb, was hidden. Boone deduces that the face is on the Moon, and Klee Pan takes Colby and Boone there and then to Saturn after cutting the face from the Moon's surface. When the face is destroyed by a trap set by Chun Yull, the patrolmen help reconstruct it and disarm the bomb. The Faceless Hunters replace the face on the Moon in gratitude, and Klee Pan gives both men telepathic abilities.

Having teleported himself to Saturn instead of dying, Chun Yull vows revenge on the patrolmen who had thwarted him, and on Earth. He captures Colby and Boone and builds a new bomb, then teleports them all to Klaramar, where Klee Pan once again foils Chun Yull and returns Colby and Boone to Earth. A year later, Chun Yull telepathically commands Colby and Boone to build a machine which increases his size and transports him to Earth again, which he threatens to destroy unless he is made 'Earth Citizen Number One'. After the United Nations comply, he reveals that he lied - Faceless Hunters are unable to destroy a planet unless they are citizens of it. Meanwhile, Colby and Boone manage to beam themselves to Klaramar and Klee Pan saves Earth and again captures Chun Yull.

=== DC Comics Presents ===
After this defeat, Chun Yull is imprisoned in inescapable 'Spheres of Light', from which the Enchantress frees him because she needed his space traveling powers; he then travels the stars for over 20 years looking for a sorcerer she wishes to team up with to rule the Universe. Together with Yggardis the Living Planet, Atom Master, Kraklow the Mystic, Vandal Savage, Mister Poseidon and Ultivac, Chun Yull and Enchantress form part of a criminal organization known as The Forgotten Villains. Superman joins a disparate group of minor heroes from the 20th century and the future banded together as the Forgotten Heroes and defeats Chun Yull in the future, returning him to captivity.

Following Crisis on Infinite Earths, Chun Yull and the Forgotten Villains battle the Forgotten Heroes again; this time 1.93 million years in the past. He is returned to captivity in the 20th century in Rip Hunter's Time Machine, after being abandoned with the rest of the Forgotten Villains by Kraklow and defeated by Animal Man. Eighteen months later, he is seen fighting Young Justice on the island nation of Zandia.

=== Revenge of the Green Lanterns ===
Just over three years later, three Faceless Hunters working as bounty hunters, including Chun Yull, are hunting Green Lanterns. They take control of the minds of a number of the Global Guardians to capture Green Lantern Hal Jordan; but are mistakenly attacked by a team of Rocket Reds assuming Green Lantern is with them - thwarting their plans to wipe his memory.

=== New Krypton ===
The Faceless Hunters later appears in Superman: World of New Krypton #9 (November 2009), under the command of Jemm, Son of Saturn who appears to be the de facto ruler of all three Saturnian races, including the albino Koolars and the yellow Faceless Hunters.

== Powers and abilities ==
The Klaramarians are normally of sub-atomic size, although they can control this, and are often much taller than humans, with a corresponding increase in strength. They also have access to extremely advanced alien technology. Both Chun Yull and Klee Pan possess great strength and the ability to absorb the material or energetic properties of anything they touch and project those properties explosively. Yull demonstrated the power of unaided flight while battling Superman.

Most Klaramarians also appear to be telepaths. Klee Pan demonstrated the ability to grant limited telepathy to humans.

== Other versions ==
A Faceless Hunter appears in JLA/Avengers #4 as a brainwashed minion of Krona.

== In other media ==
- A Faceless Hunter appears in the Batman: The Brave and the Bold two-part episode "The Siege of Starro!", voiced by John DiMaggio. This version is a violent outcast from a peaceful society and a servant of Starro who is immune to his parasites.
- The Chun Yull incarnation of the Faceless Hunter appears as a character summon in Scribblenauts Unmasked: A DC Comics Adventure.
- A Faceless Hunter leader named Jemm appears in the Supergirl episode "Human For a Day", portrayed by Charles Halford.
