= Wonder Woman: Gods and Mortals =

1987 comic book story arc by George Pérez

"Gods and Mortals"
- Cover of Wonder Woman vol. 2, 1 (February 1987), art by George Pérez
- Publisher: DC Comics
- Publication date: February – August 1987
- Genre: Superhero; Mythology
- Title(s): Wonder Woman vol. 2 #1–7
- Main character(s): Wonder Woman; Queen Hippolyta; Ares; Hercules

Creative team
- Writer(s): George Pérez; Greg Potter; Len Wein
- Penciller: George Pérez
- Inker: Bruce D. Patterson
- Editor(s): Janice Race; Karen Berger

"Gods and Mortals" is a seven issue comic book story arc plotted and drawn by George Pérez, with scripting by Greg Potter and Len Wein. Released in 1987, this was the first arc of the relaunched Wonder Woman series.

== Story ==
=== The Princess and the Power ===
A tale of the Amazons from 30,000 BC to now. A cavewoman, and her unborn daughter, are murdered by her mate. On Mount Olympus, Ares opposes Artemis' plans to create a new race of female mortals to set an example to other mortals, and Zeus does not care. Artemis and four other Goddesses, Athena, Hestia, Demeter, and Aphrodite, go to the Cavern of Souls where they use all the souls of perished, except for one, to create reborn, ageless Amazons. With their queens, Queen Hippolyta and Queen Antiope, the Amazons are successful but there is jealously from Greek kings. Ares manipulates Heracles to create anger towards the Amazons and under the guise of allies to the female warriors, Hercules drugs and chains the Amazons and burns down their home. Praying, Athena frees Hippolyta with the promise of no revenge, but the Amazons ignore the promise and murder the men who had chained them. In the end, Antiope leaves with half of the Amazons while Hippolyta and the remaining half are taken by Athena to be eternal jailers of evil on their new island home, Themyscira. Centuries later, Hippolyta prays for a daughter and after making a baby out of clay, the last soul is reborn as a new Amazon blessed with gifts from the gods named Diana. When she is an adult, the Gods cry to the Amazons to choose a champion to face Ares against his plans for the outside world. Diana is forbidden to enter the contest, but thanks to Athena, she enters masked like all the rest. At the end, Diana is revealed and while her mother is against it, Diana is chosen. Receiving her bulletproof bracelets, and her Warrior's garb, she is now prepared to protect the world.

=== A Fire in the Sky ===
General Kohler, working for Ares, gives Steve Trevor a mission. Back on Themyscira, Diana is given by Hermes the Lasso of Truth and is taken to see Harmonia, Ares' daughter, who gives her an amulet and is taken back home. Above Themyscira, Steve's co-pilot, also working for Ares, attacks him planning to bomb the island. Diana flies toward the plane just as the bomb is dropped, but Diana throws it back to the plane where it explodes and Diana saves Steve. Etta Candy checks in with General Kohler to find him dead and melted. Steve is being cared for at Themyscira when Athena appears to tell Diana that she needs the other half of the amulet to defeat. With Steve in her arms, Diana says farewell to her sisters and is transported by Hermes to Man's World.

=== Deadly Arrival ===
Diana sees what Man's World is like as she drops Steve Trevor in the base where he is found and is placed under arrest for the so-called mission and the murder of General Kohler. At Harvard University, Diana meets the mentor she was told who will help her, Professor Julia Kapatelis, who agrees to help Diana after she sees the Talisman even though she doesn't understand Diana's Ancient Themysciran language. Phobos, one of Ares' sons, forms a statuette out of blood from a Gorgon. His brother, Deimos, manipulates the militaries of the U.S. and Russia to fight one another. Steve Trevor is questioned by General Tolliver, who then prepares to kill him but Steve escapes. Etta is told by his escape just as Steve enters to tell her that someone is trying to kill him. Julia's daughter, Vanessa Kapatelis, receives a package to her mother. Later, Julia arrives with Diana and her and Vanessa meet. By midnight, Diana has learned English quickly and the statue starts to glow. Vanessa screams and the whole house goes into total disarray. Vanessa has now rapidly aged and Decay (the statue) destroys the house.

=== A Long Day's Journey into Fright ===
The three escape from the house and Diana goes after Decay as a crowd appears. Watching, Athena questions their trust in Diana just as Demeter arrives and announces that the Ark to take them to oblivion for failing with the Amazons. Etta searches through Tolliver's office and finds "Ares Project" folder. Press and Television gather as Diana and Decay begin to fight. Diana charges at Decay and struggles her to the ground. Strangling Diana, she feels weak but realizes the Earth might help and uses her lasso around Decay's neck and the monster is finally dead. Publicist Myndi Mayer hears the news and by using the "W" on her costume, Diana is named "Wonder Woman" by the media. In a hideout, Steve sees Diana's face and realizes she saved her from the plane crash. Doctors can not reverse Vanessa's aging process. Julia cries as Diana arrives and the two women arrive at Julia's Winter Home so they can continue studying the Amulet. Diana sees someone outside and turns out to be Steve. He tells her that he needs her help just as Etta screams for Steve.

=== The Ares Assault ===
Ares's influence grows as great military powers are preparing to fight. Colonel Michaelis explains that he followed Steve and Etta in hopes to help them and Etta slipped and fell. Etta is resting as she shows all of them "The Ares Project" file. With no luck on the Talisman, Diana realizes the pattern on the Talisman matches the chart from the Ares File. She explains that when the Talisman pattern is laid over the map, it marks the sites of various nuclear bases of the world, the target of the Ares Project. Just as she speaks, Tolliver leads renegade troops to take over one of the bases; World War III is about to start! Diana also figures out that the second half she is looking for is through the mirror's reflection of the Talisman. Diana prepares to go, along with Julia, Steve, Michaelis and Etta. Steve tells Etta that Diana reminds him of his mother. The five are taken to Ares' sons' domain, where Deimos sends several massive snakes at Diana and Phobos has Diana's friends experience their fears: Etta is buried alive, Steve fights spiders, Julia drowns and Michaelis' is attacked by wild cats. Diana disposes the last serpent and attacks the fears and each sons' attacks are defeated. But Diana's hair turns into serpents and inject venom into her. Removing her tiara, Diana kills Deimos, her hair goes back to normal and Phobos flees dropping the second half of the Amulet. Combining the two, Diana and her friends are transported to the control room Tolliver took over.

=== Powerplay ===
Etta, Steve and Michaelis attack Tolliver's men as Diana counters Tolliver at the control room. His troops rush her, but with her strength, she throws them off. Steve attacks an evil-spirited Tolliver corpse just as the key is yet to be turned. Diana vanishes and finally meets Ares, showing her his influence growing stronger. Diana attacks, but Ares blasts her into agony with his enjoyment. Grabbing her by the throat, Diana slams the Amulet on Ares' head and cries in pain as he ignites Diana. With her last strength, Diana uses her lasso on Ares and he screams and his world goes mad and Diana is knocked and is alive, but barely. Ares sees everything he wants: death, destruction, but misses something. Because of the war he created and the deaths of many, his influence falls and feels alone. Diana has shown him the ultimate consequences of his actions. Ares agrees on Diana's request to end the madness, and the balance is restored. Before sending her back, Ares tells Diana that she must save mankind from itself. Medics attend to the wounded Julia and Etta, and Colonel Michaelis is dead. Steve appears carrying the body of Diana.

=== Rebirth ===
On Mount Olympus, Zeus goes into celebration over Ares' defeat, and the Goddesses' oblivion is canceled. On Themyscira, however, the Amazons take the wounded Diana to the Island of Healing in the ancient ritual of revival. Artemis pleads with Zeus and he calls on the God Poseidon to save Diana. Thanks to him, Diana's body is healed and she is alive. Days later, Hippolyta and Diana discuss what Ares said to her and her mother does not want her to return to Man's World after she almost died. Athena gives Diana, as a sign of their support, a pair of winged sandals that Diana can wear from Themyscira to Man's World. Her mother then agrees. Etta and Colonel Hillary head to Vanessa's room to see Diana present with the cure to save her. Julia gets a call on her daughter's recovery and heads there where she sees Vanessa back to normal and Diana. Diana needs help in her mission to spread her message and Julia helps her by taking her to see Myndi Mayer, who decides to refer Diana as Wonder Woman to avoid confusion to the Diana, Princess of Wales. In an epilogue, archaeologist Barbara Minerva hears about Wonder Woman and wants her lasso.

== Publication history ==
By the 1980s, DC Comics felt that their continuity was too difficult and complex for new readers to understand. To address this issue, the company published the Crisis on Infinite Earths limited series in 1985. The first Wonder Woman series ended with #329 (February 1986) and the character was killed in the last issue of Crisis (March 1986). Because the crossover wiped the slate clean by erasing all of continuity, the stage was now set for a complete relaunch and reboot of the title.

Writer Greg Potter, who previously created the Jemm, Son of Saturn series for DC, was hired to rework the character. He spent several months working with editor Janice Race on new concepts, before being joined by writer/artist George Pérez. Inspired by John Byrne and Frank Miller's work on refashioning Superman and Batman, Pérez came in as the plotter and penciler of Wonder Woman. The Wonder Woman character, the supporting cast, the villains, and the stories, were now much more firmed in Greek mythology. The drama was on concerning Diana's explorations of modern society, and the book had more realism than the pre-Crisis version in showing an innocent young Amazon entering our world and the issues she would face.

Race left DC before the first issue of the new series was published to return to book publishing and was replaced by Karen Berger. Potter left DC as well after completing the second issue of the new series and was replaced by Len Wein. Pérez was originally set for six months but ended up staying on the book for five years. His relaunch of the character was a critical and sales success.

== Post-Crisis alterations to Wonder Woman's history ==
- Wonder Woman first leaves Themyscira and arrives in the United States during the events of the 1986 Legends crossover rather than at the dawn of the Silver Age. Within the DC Universe timeline, this has Wonder Woman appear in the DCU several years later than Superman, Batman, Green Lantern Hal Jordan, et al., as well as several years after the formation of the Justice League, invalidating her status as a founding member despite her presence in the original series. This retcon also erased virtually all Wonder Woman stories and appearances from the Golden Age, Silver Age, and up through the Crisis on Infinite Earths from canon continuity. In order to compensate for her absence from Justice League continuity, Black Canary was retroactively inserted into the roster in Wonder Woman's place as a founding member.
- In her updated origin, Wonder Woman arrives in the United States with absolutely no knowledge of the English language, having been raised in a society secluded from the rest of the world for some 3,000 years. This differs from all previous Wonder Woman origin stories in which Diana arrives in the United States already fluent in English. A fast learner, Diana picks up a solid proficiency in the language with the help of Julia Kapatelis by the time of her first confrontation with Ares in Gods and Mortals, and is fluent within a few months of living in America.
- Steve Trevor, who was previously seen as a younger man of comparable age to Wonder Woman and who had acted as a romantic interest for Wonder Woman throughout her entire comic's history since her first appearance in 1940 (including all television adaptations and even in the 2009 animated movie), was re-written to be in his forties, some twenty years older than Diana, and, rather than a suitor, would come to act as more of a brotherly figure to Diana. He later marries Etta Candy.
- Pre-Crisis, the name "Wonder Woman" was a title by the Amazons for the greatest Amazon warrior. Post-Crisis, the name was given to Diana by the U.S. media shortly after her first public appearance after a reporter takes note of her breastplate insignia resembling a double-W.
- In her pre-Crisis origin, Wonder Woman's star-spangled American-themed costume is deliberately designed by the Amazons to mimic the American flag in order to aid her in gaining the trust and support of the American people. In her post-crisis origin, revealed in "Challenge of the Gods", the costume was created years before Diana's birth as ceremonial armor inspired by WWII U.S. Air Force pilot Diana Rockwell Trevor, who by an ironic twist of fate happened to be the mother of Steve Trevor. Diana Trevor had crash landed on Themyscira decades before Diana's birth and sacrificed her life to save her Amazon sisters who were being attacked by the Cottus, who had broken through Doom's Doorway, the barrier jailing numerous mythical monsters beneath Themyscira. In order to pay tribute to the unknown woman who had saved their lives, the Amazons created two costumes based on the patches and badges worn on Trevor's jacket - one that was worn by Trevor at her cremation, and the other which would only be worn by a champion worthy of the armor. This would be given to Diana after she won the contest to go face Ares in 'Man's World'.
- Pre-Crisis, Diana had the standard compunction against killing as most superheroes of the DC Universe. This version is a classically trained warrior with a corresponding practicality in battle and is perfectly willing to use deadly force when the situation calls for it.

== Collected editions ==
- Wonder Woman Vol. 1: Gods and Mortals collects Wonder Woman vol. 2 #1–7, 192 pages, March 2004, ISBN 978-1401201975
- Wonder Woman: Gods & Mortals Book & DVD Set collects Wonder Woman vol. 2 #1–7, 192 pages, August 2015, ISBN 978-1401260026
- Wonder Woman by George Perez Omnibus includes Wonder Woman vol. 2 #1–24 and Annual #1, 640 pages, August 2015, ISBN 978-1401255473

== In other media ==
The 2009 DC Universe Animated Original Movies film Wonder Woman is loosely based on the story arc.
