= Tangent Comics =

DC Comics imprint

- Parent company: DC Comics
- Status: Dormant (since 2009)
- Founded: 1997
- Founder: Dan Jurgens (writer); Eddie Berganza (editor)
- Publication types: Comics
- Fiction genres: Superhero

Tangent Comics is a DC Comics imprint created in 1997, developed from ideas by Dan Jurgens. The line, formed from 18 one-shots, focused on creating all-new characters using established DC names, such as the Joker, Superman, and the Flash. Contrasting the Tangent Universe with the DC Universe, Jurgens commented:

The Tangent Universe tells the story of an Earth greatly influenced by the presence of super-powered beings. While the DCU Earth is essentially the same as our own, no more advanced in terms of technology or communications despite the existence of those qualities within the super-powered community, Earth Tangent is greatly influenced by all of that. Earth Tangent's economic, geographic and political landscapes are defined by the superhero community, whereas in the DCU those aspects exist unaffected by the superhero community.

== Publication history ==
=== The Superman ===
According to Dan Jurgens, the reconceptualization of Superman "went through many permutations". An early idea eschewed powers altogether and revolved around highlighting the "man" in "Superman", and making him "a cop, or a doctor or something different. A guy with no powers but tremendous character who fights on behalf of his fellow man". Writer Mark Millar noted that "the classic Superman role is already filled by the Atom", and wanted to echo "Kafka's metamorphosis where we actually see this likable, regular guy transform into a superhuman". Thus Millar took Jurgens' early idea "of the average Joe as the superMAN" and used artist Jackson Guice's "unique approach to the flashback scenes" (as seen in his Resurrection Man work) to create a different style than that used by Guice on his Action Comics work. The character and his storyline also draw influence from the story The Reign of the Superman written by Jerry Siegel and Joe Shuster prior to the creation of their iconic character. The Tangent Universe's Superman utilizes the name of DC villain Two-Face (Harvey Dent) rather than the name 'Clark Kent'. Superman's powers, according to his writer, are that "his brain is evolving at an accelerated rate" thanks to a 'god-force'.

=== Wonder Woman ===
Writer Peter David worked from Jurgens' concept that Tangent's Wonder Woman is "a female warrior" exiled to Earth for sins committed on another world. Seeking a twist to make her different from the original DCU character, David thought up Wanda's origin as "a symbol of what [her] world could be if [her people] were united". Combining two diverse aspects, she "seems distracted in any combat situation" and "would rather not fight", preferring "pondering some deep philosophical point". After the character conception, artist Gene Ha produced design artwork, initially of a bearded lady, but eventually merely "a very alien woman".

=== Nightwing: Nightforce ===
Writer John Ostrander previously wrote Nightwing for the first wave of Tangent issues and for his second wave issue christened the team (Hex, Black Orchid and Wildcat) "Nightforce". Citing the benefit of the Tangent line as giving "a far greater freedom to sculpt the world in any fashion we want", Jurgens said that for the second wave he hoped to "see Earth totally and completely subjugated". As the Tangent Universe's premiere covert team, much of the "mammoth task" of staging a pivotal Tangent event fell to Ostrander, who installed an undead, vampire Stalin as head of a Soviet Empire. Ostrander also revealed the "Dark Circle", whose members could be killed and "resurrected as a warrior, Night of the Living Dead style, for the Ultra-Humanite".

== Overview ==
The history of the Tangent Universe radically diverges from the real world due to the presence of superheroes. The interference of the original Atom causes the Cuban Missile Crisis to escalate into a limited nuclear exchange that results in the nuclear obliteration of Florida and Cuba. The aftermath of the destruction of Florida shapes the lives of several characters.

The city of New Atlantis is created out of the remains of the city of Atlanta and is later the birthplace of the Joker. A group of sea creatures are mutated by the radioactive fallout into humanoid form and become known as the Sea Devils. The other major event to have repercussions is the Soviet Union's invasion of Czechoslovakia in 1968, which leads to the creation of the Manhunter and the deployment of alternate Metal Men as a U.S. black ops squad. As a result of the Cuban War in this timeline, the Soviet Union still existed in the late 1990s and was still a world superpower. China was not involved in this nuclear exchange and has its own metahuman genetic experimentation program, resulting in the creation of Supergirl and Power Girl.

== Series ==
Based on concepts created by Dan Jurgens, Tangent Comics as a whole is dedicated to Julius Schwartz.

=== 1997 titles ===
- The Atom
  - The grandson of the Tangent Earth's first superhero, an atomic veteran, takes on the mantle and learns a horrible truth about his family. Written and penciled by Dan Jurgens, with finishes by Paul Ryan.
- Doom Patrol
  - A team from the future arrives in the present, warning of the impending destruction of the Earth. Team members include Doomsday, Star Sapphire, Firehawk and Rampage. Written by Dan Jurgens, art by Sean Chen.
- The Flash
  - Lia Nelson, the first baby born in space, grows up to become a teenage superhero with light-based powers. She can move at the speed of light and create holographic constructs. Written by Todd Dezago, art by Gary Frank.
- Green Lantern
  - A woman with a lantern which, when placed upon a grave, can bring the dead back to life just long enough to complete unfinished business. Written by James Robinson, art by J. H. Williams III.
- The Joker
  - A costumed anarchist in the city of New Atlantis uses pranks to highlight the failings and hypocrisy of those in power. Written by Karl Kesel, art by Matt Haley.
- Metal Men
  - The Metal Men are a covert military group, so named because they came back from every mission unscathed. The members are nicknamed "Hawkman", "Lobo", "Gravedigger", and "Black Lightning". Written by Ron Marz, art by Mike McKone.
- Nightwing
  - A group of agents from a mystical secret society that controls much of the world go renegade. Written by John Ostrander, art by Jan Duursema.
- Sea Devils
  - A society of mer-people are created by the nuclear exchange that destroyed Cuba and Florida in 1962. Written by Kurt Busiek, art by Vincent Giarrano.
- Secret Six
  - The Secret Six are a covert group of heroes who are formed when the Flash, Atom, the Joker, the Spectre, Plastic Man and the Manhunter join forces to combat Dr. Aquadus, a living ocean. Written by Chuck Dixon, art by Tom Grummett.

=== 1998 titles ===
Because the Tangent Comics titles were not linked to DC Comics' shared universe, they were free to make sweeping changes. In the Tangent one-shot issues published in 1998, an electromagnetic pulse disables technology worldwide and a powerful being called the Ultra-Humanite begins taking over the world.

- Powergirl
  - U.S. agents attempt to kidnap China's genetically-engineered superhuman. Written by Ron Marz, with art by Dusty Abell.
- Nightwing: Nightforce
  - The rogue Nightwing agents (including Jade, Obsidian, Black Orchid and Wildcat) attempt to rescue the Doom Patrol from the Soviet Union, only to unleash the Ultra-Humanite. Written by John Ostrander, art by Jan Duursema.
- The Superman
  - An ordinary man finds himself evolving into something millions of years beyond human. Written by Mark Millar, art by Jackson Guice.
- Tales of the Green Lantern
  - The Green Lantern tells three possible, and contradictory, stories of her origin. The framing sequence was written by James Robinson and drawn by J. H. Williams III and Mick Gray. The first two alternate origins were written by Dan Abnett and Andy Lanning, with art by Mike Mayhew and Wade Von Grawbadger; Georges Jeanty and Drew Geraci. The third was written by John Ostrander, with art by Ryan Sook.
- The Batman
  - A knight who once fought King Arthur is forced to atone for his sins, seeking justice through an empty suit of armor for all eternity.
- The Joker's Wild
  - The story focuses on three mischievous but essentially good superheroines (Madame Xanadu, Mary Marvel and Lori Lemaris) all masquerading as the Joker in New Atlantis. Written by Karl Kesel and Tom Simmons, art by Joe Phillips.
- The Trials of the Flash
  - The Flash teams up with her friends in the Secret Six to rescue one of their own from Nightwing. Written by Todd Dezago, art by Paul Pelletier.
- Wonder Woman
  - An alien warrior, meant to be the symbol of unity for her fractured world, is instead pursued to Earth. She battles her pursuers in Las Vegas, all the while wondering about her role in the cosmos. Written by Peter David and drawn by Angel Unzueta from designs by Gene Ha.
- JLA
  - A covert group of operatives is formed to take out several superhumans (the Batman, Wonder Woman, Green Lantern and the Superman). Eventually, the four targets come together and form their own Justice League. Written by Dan Jurgens, with art by Darryl Banks and Norm Rapmund.

=== Tangent: Superman's Reign (2008) ===
The 12-issue miniseries revisits the Tangent Universe 10 years later, both in reality and fiction. The series ran between March 2008 until April 2009 and was written by Dan Jurgens with art by Jamal Igle and Carlos Magno. The series was met with favorable reviews, noting strong character development and plotting.

In efforts to aid an alternate-reality-displaced Tangent Flash (Lia Nelson), Green Lantern (John Stewart) and the Flash (Wally West) are inexplicably transported to Earth-9, the Tangent Universe, by the Tangent Green Lantern. The trio joins the Tangent Spectre and the Tangent Manhunter in freeing the Atom, leaving Stewart captured by the Tangent Superman, ruler of Earth-9. While being interrogated by the Tangent Superman, Stewart's ring is contacted by Hal Jordan's ring, which the Tangent Green Lantern uses to bring additional members of the Justice League to Earth-9. The rescued Atom is revealed to be the Tangent Powergirl, lover to the Tangent Superman, and a fight ensues. The Tangent Manhunter is brutally murdered. The Tangent Superman takes Stewart's power ring and uses the ring, augmented by his psychic powers and the magic of the Tangent Orion, to travel to New Earth of the mainstream DC Universe. Meanwhile, Batman infiltrates the Core, the hub of information on Earth-9, and is saved by the Tangent Batman while escaping, who is mounting a revolution against the Tangent Superman. The Tangent Superman and the Tangent Powergirl battle their New Earth counterparts, only to escape and destroy the White House. The Tangent Superman proceeds to kidnap the world's leaders, take power from them and detonate a nuclear weapon to distract New Earth's heroes. While on Earth-9, the heroes find and recruit the Tangent Superman's last tie to humanity, his wife Lola Dent. The heroes on Earth-9 transport themselves back to New Earth, where the combined forces of New Earth's and Earth-9's heroes fight against the Tangent Superman, the Tangent Powergirl and a cadre of villains that the Earth-9 ruler has gathered from New Earth (Lex Luthor, the Joker, Mr. Freeze, Icicle, Black Manta, Poison Ivy, and Felix Faust), as well as the Tangent Ultra-Humanite. The raging battle against the Tangent Superman weakens him, allowing him to be defeated by his wife.

=== Convergence (2015) ===
Convergence is a two-month weekly miniseries, published by DC Comics, that ran from April–May 2015. Convergence spins out of the final issues of the weekly series Earth 2: World's End and The New 52: Futures End. The story involves Brainiac trapping cities from various timelines and planets that have ended, transporting them in domes to a planet outside of time and space and "opening them for a great experiment to see what happens when all these folks meet". Notable during this event is the return of DC characters from before the 2011 Flashpoint story arc that led to the creation of The New 52 universe.

== Interactions with the mainstream DC Universe ==
The Kingdom (1998) revealed that the Tangent Universe was part of Hypertime, a fluid system of alternate realities based on splitting and re-merging timelines. Regular DC characters became aware of the Tangent Universe, but did not interact with it.

Infinite Crisis (2006) identified the Tangent Universe as Earth-97, part of the recreated DC Multiverse. As Earth-97 was being destroyed in the chaos, the Tangent Universe's Green Lantern said that the heroes had to follow her lantern's light in order to survive. At the end of the story on New Earth, two children found the lantern belonging to the Tangent Universe's Green Lantern washed up on a beach.

The Tangent Universe's Green Lantern, Flash and Atom appeared in Ion #9-10 (February–March 2007), in which they displaced Ion and the two children who had found the lantern. Ion found himself in the Bleed, where he encountered Captain Atom. Upon returning to Earth, Ion defeated the Tangent heroes, apparently by sending them back to their native dimension. During this appearance, everything said by the Tangent heroes was a repeat of lines from the original Tangent Comics run.

The Tangent Universe's Green Lantern later appeared in Justice League of America (vol. 2) #50 (December 2010), where she fled to New Earth in order to warn its heroes of an impending attack by the Crime Syndicate of America. During the issue, it was revealed that the Syndicate members had ravaged the Tangent Universe's Earth and killed many of its heroes in the process. The Tangent Universe's Green Lantern later became instrumental in the ensuing battle by temporarily resurrecting Alexander Luthor Jr. of the original Earth-Three and by the end of the story, the Tangent Universe had been restored to its former state.

=== Earth-9 ===
The "History of the Multiverse" backup stories in the 2007–2008 series Countdown to Final Crisis established that the Tangent Universe now exists as one of the new 52 alternate universes. DC's official list of the current known multiverse lists the Tangent Universe as Earth-9.

== Collected editions ==
DC Comics reprinted the Tangent Comics one-shot issues and the miniseries Tangent: Superman's Reign in a series of five trade paperbacks:

- Tangent Comics (August 2007), 208 pages, collecting the Tangent Comics: The Atom, Metal Men, The Flash, Green Lantern and Sea Devils one-shot issues.
- Tangent Comics Volume Two (January 2008), 192 pages, collecting the Tangent Comics: The Joker, Nightwing, Batman, Secret Six and Doom Patrol one-shot issues.
- Tangent Comics Volume Three (June 2008), 208 pages, collecting the Tangent Comics: The Superman, Wonder Woman, The Joker's Wild, JLA, Tales of the Green Lantern, Powergirl, Nightwing: Nightforce and The Trials of the Flash one-shot issues.
- Tangent: Superman's Reign Volume One (February 2009), 160 pages, collecting #1–6 and Justice League of America (vol. 2) #16
- Tangent: Superman's Reign Volume Two (September 2009), 144 pages, collecting #7–12
