= Buddy Baker (disambiguation) =

- Buddy Baker (1941–2015), American stock car racing driver
- Buddy Baker (composer) (1918–2002), American composer
- Buddy Baker, real name of DC Comics character Animal Man
