= Animal Man =

Superhero in the DC Comics Universe

- Animal Man as depicted in 52 #20 (November 2006) by J. G. Jones.

Publication information
- Publisher: DC Comics
- First appearance: Strange Adventures #180 (September 1965)
- Created by: Dave Wood; Carmine Infantino

In-story information
- Alter ego: Bernhard "Buddy" Baker
- Species: Metahuman
- Team affiliations: Justice League Europe; Forgotten Heroes; White Lantern Corps; Justice League United; Justice League; Justice League Dark; Black Lantern Corps
- Partnerships: Swamp Thing; Vixen; Adam Strange; Starfire
- Notable aliases: A-Man
- Abilities: Ability to gain the powers of any animal that exists or has existed via access to "The Red"

Animal Man (Bernhard "Buddy" Baker) is a superhero appearing in American comic books published by DC Comics. As a result of being in proximity to an exploding extraterrestrial spaceship, Buddy Baker acquires the ability to temporarily "borrow" the abilities of animals (such as a bird's flight or the proportionate strength of an ant). Using these powers, Baker fights crime as the costumed superhero Animal Man.

Created by writer Dave Wood and artist Carmine Infantino, Buddy Baker first appeared in Strange Adventures #180 (September 1965) and adopted the name Animal Man in issue #190. Animal Man was a minor character for his first twenty years, never gaining the popularity of other DC heroes such as Batman or Superman. He made only five, non-consecutive appearances in Strange Adventures (four of which were reprinted in Adventure Comics), followed by two appearances in Wonder Woman, two in Action Comics, and two in DC Comics Presents, appearing in consecutive issues of each. These eleven stories constitute the entirety of his pre-Crisis appearances. He later became one of several DC properties, such as Shade, the Changing Man and Sandman, to be revived and revamped in the late 1980s for a more mature comics audience. As seen in Strange Adventures #195, he was billed as a "full-time hero", an aspect that would be the most changed by the revamp.

== Publication history ==
=== Beginnings ===
Strange Adventures #190 (July 1966). First appearance of costumed Animal Man, originally A-Man. Cover art by Carmine Infantino and Murphy Anderson.

Film stunt man Buddy Baker, to whom aliens gave animal-themed powers, debuted in Strange Adventures #180 (cover-dated September 1965), in the story "I Was the Man with Animal Powers" by writer Dave Wood and penciler Carmine Infantino. Despite losing his powers at the end of Strange Adventures #180, he gains them back during the events of Strange Adventures #184 (January 1966). Baker gained a costume and a name, initially A-Man, in Strange Adventures #190 (July 1966). He continued as a semi-regular feature in the book, making occasional cover appearances, through #201 (June 1967).

His subsequent appearances were sporadic. In 1980, he had a guest appearance in Wonder Woman #267–268. His main appearances in the remainder of the decade were as a member of the "Forgotten Heroes", a team of minor DC heroes. It was in that capacity that he appeared in the company-wide crossover storyline Crisis on Infinite Earths.

=== Grant Morrison revival ===
In the late 1980s, following the slate-cleaning Crisis on Infinite Earths event, DC began employing innovative writers, many of them young and from the U.K., to revamp some of their old characters. In the period that saw Alan Moore reinvent the Swamp Thing, Animal Man was reimagined by Scottish writer Grant Morrison. Morrison wrote the first 26 issues of the Animal Man comic book, published between 1988 and 1990, with art by Chas Truog and Doug Hazlewood; Brian Bolland provided the covers.

Although the series was initially conceived as a four-issue limited series, it was upgraded into an ongoing series following strong sales. Consequently, Morrison developed several long-running plots, introducing mysteries, some of which were not explained until a year or two later. The title featured the protagonist both in and—increasingly—out of costume. Morrison made the title character an everyman figure living in a universe populated by superheroes, aliens, and fantastic technology. Buddy's wife Ellen, his son Cliff (9 years old at the beginning of the series), and his daughter Maxine (5 years old) featured prominently in most storylines, and his relationship with them, as husband, father, and provider, was an ongoing theme.

The series championed vegetarianism and animal rights, causes Morrison supported. In one issue, Buddy helps a band of self-described eco-terrorists save a pod of dolphins. Enraged at a fisherman's brutality, Buddy drops him into the ocean, intending for him to drown. Ironically, the man is saved from drowning by a dolphin.

Buddy fought several menaces, such as an ancient, murderous spirit that was hunting him; brutal, murderous Thanagarian warriors; and even the easily defeated red robots of an elderly villain who was tired of life. The series made deep, sometimes esoteric references to the entire DC canon, including B'wana Beast, the Mirror Master, and Arkham Asylum.

Soon after the launch of his series, Animal Man briefly became a member of Justice League Europe, appearing in several early issues of their series.

Following Morrison's run, Peter Milligan wrote a six-issue story featuring several surreal villains and heroes, exploring questions about identity and quantum physics and utilizing the textual cut-up technique popularized by William Burroughs. Tom Veitch and Steve Dillon then took over for 18 issues, in which Buddy returned to his work as a movie stuntman and explored mystical totemic aspects of his powers. Jamie Delano wrote 29 issues with Steve Pugh as artist (with occasional issues by other artists, like Will Simpson), giving the series a more horror-influenced feel with a "suggested for mature readers" label on the cover, beginning with issue #51.

==== Vertigo ====
After Jamie Delano's first six issues, wherein, among other things, he killed off the central character of Buddy Baker, created the "Red" (analogous to the "Green" of Swamp Thing) and resurrected Buddy as an "animal avatar", the series became one of the charter titles of DC's new mature readers Vertigo imprint with #57, and its ties to the DC Universe became more tenuous. Vertigo was establishing itself as a distinct "mini-universe" with its own continuity, only occasionally interacting with the continuity of the regular DC Universe. The title evolved into a more horror-themed book, with Buddy eventually becoming a non-human animal god. The superhero elements of the book were largely removed—since Buddy was reborn as a kind of animal elemental, and legally deceased, he discarded his costume, stopped associating with other heroes, and generally abandoned his crimefighting role. He co-founded the Life Power Church of Maxine to further an environmentalist message, drifting along U.S. Route 66 to settle in Montana. Delano's final issue was #79, culminating in Buddy dying again.

Between issues #66 and #67, Delano also penned Animal Man Annual #1, focusing on Buddy's daughter Maxine. It was the third part of Vertigo's crossover event "The Children's Crusade". This event ran across the Annuals of the five then-Vertigo titles --- Animal Man, Swamp Thing, Black Orchid, The Books of Magic, and Doom Patrol—book-ended by two Children's Crusade issues co-written by Neil Gaiman, and starring his Dead Boy Detectives.

A brief run by Jerry Prosser and Fred Harper featured a re-reborn Buddy as a white-haired shamanistic figure before the series was canceled after the 89th issue due to declining sales.

=== Back in the DCU ===
After the cancellation of his own series, Animal Man made cameos in several other titles, returning to his standard costumed form.

He has been utilized in most of the recent DC company-wide crossovers fighting alongside other less-mainstream heroes, including Infinite Crisis and 52, the latter of which was co-written by Grant Morrison, as well as Justice League of America #25.

=== The Last Days of Animal Man miniseries ===
In 2009 Gerry Conway and artist Chris Batista produced The Last Days of Animal Man, a six-issue limited series telling the tale of Animal Man in the future. The series portrays a middle-aged Animal Man in the year 2024 on his final adventure.

=== Relaunch ===
As part of The New 52, DC Comics relaunched Animal Man with issue #1 in September 2011 with writer Jeff Lemire and artist Travel Foreman.

The relaunched Animal Man has been met with a great deal of critical acclaim. MTV Geek said: "I don't want to oversell this, but if there is a better book put out by DC during the month of September, I will eat the other 51 comics. It's just that good". The A.V. Club writer Oliver Sava wrote that the "first issue of Animal Man combines family drama, superhero action, and macabre horror into a cohesive story that is unique, yet still true to the history of Buddy Baker". Read/RANT said: "Along with Action Comics, Animal Man is among the best the line has to offer", and gave the book an A+ overall, calling it the Must Read Book of the Week. Greg McElhatton at Comic Book Resources was less complimentary, giving the book 3.5 stars (out of 5): "The art might be uneven in Animal Man #1, but the script is dynamite".

According to ICv2.com, the relaunched Animal Man #1 sold over 55,000 copies, while Animal Man #2 was one of the 50 best-selling comics in October 2011.

The storyline of the relaunched version essentially builds on previous Animal Man continuity with Buddy as a happily married family man and superhero. Buddy is forced to take his family on the run after he discovers that his daughter Maxine is the avatar of The Red (the force which sustains all animal life) and that agents of The Rot (the elemental force of decay that are also called The Black) are seeking to kill her.

== Fictional character biography ==
Buddy Baker gained animal powers when he encountered a spaceship that blew up, infusing him with radiation. He used his powers to fight crime and ward off alien attackers.

He then joined the Forgotten Heroes group prior to the Crisis on Infinite Earths. He was seen with this group during the Crisis.

Baker's Post-Crisis origin was slightly altered, but it retained the essence of the original. While hunting as a teenager, he encountered a crashed spaceship that apparently endowed him with his abilities (the slight discrepancies between the two stories were addressed as Pre-Crisis and Post-Crisis origins, and were acknowledged in-story, with the "original" Buddy Baker appearing, and not wishing to be written out of existence). After an apparently unsuccessful stint as a superhero, followed by a hiatus where he utilized his powers to work as a film stuntman, Baker decided to restart and make a career out of it after being inspired by the headline-making Justice League International; this is where his self-titled series begins.

He is married to his high school sweetheart, Ellen, a storyboard artist and, later, an illustrator for children's books. They have two children, Cliff and Maxine, who are a pre-teen and toddler, respectively, when the series starts. They live in a suburban area outside of San Diego.

Through the series, Animal Man becomes a man of great compassion toward all creatures, an ardent animal rights activist, an environmentalist, and a vegetarian. Later, he finds his link to the M-field has been passed on to his daughter, Maxine, who is also connected to the animal kingdom. Although he wears a mask, he goes to no great lengths to conceal his true identity. A jacket was added to Animal Man's costume (so he could have pockets and a place to put his keys as well as notes from his wife). However, this jacket was denim and not a leather jacket: Buddy specifically discusses that he will not wear leather, out of moral considerations.

An early aspect of the character was his desire for fame, and is manifested by his wish to be in the Justice League. He is initially driven by a desire for the publicity from interviews and public appearances more than any altruistic impulse. Buddy joins the newly formed Justice League Europe and bonds with Dmitri of the Rocket Reds over the shared experiences of being fathers. He soon resigns due to tragic events taking place later in his series.

After a brief period of reconditioning and exploration of his limits, Baker's first work is a job from S.T.A.R. Labs investigating a break-in at an animal testing facility. He traces it to the hero B'wana Beast, whom he is able to befriend and aid. The conditions he witnesses at the testing facilities compel him to become vegetarian, a sudden decision that briefly puts him at odds with his family. Baker also becomes a staunch animal rights activist and goes on several missions with environmental themes.

During his further adventures, he experiences glitches with his powers. He also begins experiencing evidences of his existence within a comic book, although he does not immediately understand them for what they are. He is targeted for murder by a mysterious organization upset with his environmental work, and must face the new Mirror Master. Baker is also pursued by Dr. James Highwater, a physicist with no memory of any prior existence, and seemingly no purpose other than to contact Baker. A parallel story involves a pair of yellow aliens (described as "agents of some unspecified 'higher power'" that engineered the spaceship wreck that granted his powers) who are aware of the events of the Crisis and monitor Baker's actions. They are aware of "a second Crisis" coming, which they believe that only Animal Man can avert. They reconcile the two variations of Animal Man's origin through an unexplained "surgery" that also extends his abilities. Elsewhere, in Arkham Asylum, the Psycho-Pirate, aware of "continuity" and his fictional environment, opens a gateway into the real world and other comic book realities and begins bringing several characters no longer in continuity into existence.

Baker is demoralized, however, when firefighters are injured in a laboratory blaze started by activists that he was working with. He is approached by Highwater just as he decides to give up his costumed identity. While away on a vision quest with Highwater, in which he learns the true nature of his powers and briefly sees the comic's reader, Baker's family is brutally murdered by an assassin sent by the corporate heads seeking to stop his environmental work. With the help of the Mirror Master (who had turned down the hit), Baker tracks down the businessmen and assassin and kills them. While trying to undo his family's deaths with a time machine, Baker accidentally becomes warped through time and meets the Phantom Stranger, Jason Blood, and the Immortal Man in the 1960s, who help him learn to accept his grief. Baker is then contacted by the aliens and taken to Arkham, where he stops the Psycho-Pirate and prevents damage to the continuity. Baker is transported to Limbo and encounters several comic book characters who are not being used in stories. Ultimately, Baker encounters his own writer (Grant Morrison themself), and the two share a conversation on the relationship between the creator and the fictional characters whose lives they write. After this encounter, Baker is sent back home and his family are restored back to life; it is left ambiguous as to whether or not Baker remembers the full nature of these events.

Next, after falling into a coma, Buddy finds himself in a strange alternative reality, which he correctly deduces is a divergent phase of existence and is then able to return home.

Having since left the Justice League, Baker resumes his stunt work career. He also finds himself frequently displaying uncontrolled animalistic behavior. He is assaulted by a neighbor, Travis Cody, a burnout with a PhD in electronic engineering from MIT. Cody has deduced that Baker's powers have become skewed, and that unfocused usage of his abilities kills animals. After reaching an understanding, the two work together to measure and enhance Animal Man's powers. They are themselves targeted by a group of shamans, one of whom was present at Animal Man's origin, and who are aware of the yellow aliens and the writer. During this time, Baker's daughter Maxine begins demonstrating powers similar to his own and is able to communicate with the head shaman, who is attempting to bring Baker to him.

S.T.A.R. Labs again contacts Baker, offering a position as their spokesman on environmentalism, but he declines. After an accident in which Baker kills the entire population of the San Diego Zoo, his wife takes their daughter to live with her mother in Vermont to avoid the media attention. Baker descends into depression and his son runs away, eventually ending up with an uncle, a lecherous predator. Baker goes to Vermont as well, where he finally meets the shaman. Meanwhile, Cody has been hired by S.T.A.R. Labs for his expertise, and while there he uncovers a conspiracy involving one of the shamans, but is mentally trapped in cyberspace.

Baker continued to split his time between his family, his career as Animal Man, and regular stunt work for films. He occasionally lent his talents to various superhero groups, including the JLA and the Forgotten Heroes, and played a prominent role in the Swamp Thing's task force, the Totems.

=== Post-series ===
This marked the reappearance of Buddy in costume, and heralded his return to the mainstream DC Universe (although his Vertigo appearances were clearly meant to take place inside the DCU as well). He subsequently appeared alongside Aquaman, Hawkman, and the Resurrection Man. In JLA #27 (March 1999), Buddy officially joins the League to battle a rampaging Amazo in the Florida Everglades; however, since Amazo was able to mimic the powers of any and all members of the League, they were only able to defeat Amazo by disbanding the League. Buddy does not stay for the reorganization. During a JLA crossover event, Animal Man's expertise in the morphogenetic field assists the League.

Animal Man also makes an appearance in the Identity Crisis limited series, helping to search for the murderer of Sue Dibny.

Animal Man remained obscure during the OMAC Project, and was devastated when he learnt that his good friend Rocket Red VII was killed by the OMACS in Moscow. The two of them were friends since the JLE back in the 80'S, they both had families, and got along well in the JLE.

After encountering danger signs from the animal world, Animal Man is recruited by Donna Troy as part of a team journeying to New Cronos to stop the Infinite Crisis, mirroring his role in Crisis on Infinite Earths, in which he journeyed into space with the Forgotten Heroes on Brainiac's ship. During this adventure, he formed a mentoring friendship with the new Firestorm, Jason Rusch.

Due to a malfunction of the Zeta Beam, which Adam Strange deploys to return the team to Earth, Animal Man, along with most of the heroes, go missing after Infinite Crisis. Eventually, some of the heroes are recovered, but Animal Man, Strange, and Starfire are still missing. They become core East Coast members of DC's weekly series 52.

=== 52 ===
In 52, Animal Man, Starfire, and Adam Strange are stranded on an alien planet. The trio escape, but are pursued by bounty hunters. They are joined by Lobo. In issue #36, during a battle with Lady Styx and her horde, Animal Man is killed by a necrotoxin, which causes its victims to rise again in the service of Lady Styx. Animal Man makes Starfire promise not to let him come back as a zombie. He gestures to the reader, saying, "Look, they're cheering us on. I told you the universe likes me". At the moment of his death, Ellen, still on Earth, senses his death and begins to cry.

In issue #37, moments after Starfire and Adam Strange leave Animal Man in space, Buddy comes back to life. The aliens who originally granted him his powers stand next to him, saying: "And so it begins". After plucking him out of the timestream and repairing his body, they leave him in outer space. Animal Man must reach out to another life form to survive, and claims the abilities of a group of Sun-Eaters, including their homing sense. He observes his wife from a wormhole in space provided by the aliens, only to discover that Ellen is seeing another man (though it is later revealed she only reluctantly went out with one of Buddy's friends).

Buddy returns to Earth, describing the marvels of space to his delighted family. Ellen throws a party to celebrate his return, but some followers of Lady Styx appear, bent upon killing the family. They are eliminated by Starfire, who has only partially recovered from wounds suffered in space. She delivers Buddy's jacket and faints from weakness and surprise when she sees him alive, leaving the family to care for her.

=== Countdown to Adventure ===
Animal Man joined Adam Strange and Starfire in the series titled Countdown to Adventure written by Adam Beechen. The first issue reveals that his family has been caring for Starfire, who still has not regained her powers. Buddy convinces Ellen to let Starfire stay and act as a nanny to his two children. When a strange form of madness infects the people of San Diego, he and Starfire team up to stop it. Buddy's closeness to Starfire has made Ellen disgruntled, thinking that Buddy is in love with her. Buddy's powers have been in a state of flux, not working at all at some times and manifesting strange abilities at others, such as creating a whirlwind or firing energy beams. Once their extraterrestrial trip is done, Starfire leaves the Baker home, telling them that they will always be in her heart.

=== Anansi ===
In Justice League of America vol. 2 #25, Buddy is drawn into Vixen's animal totem and captured by the trickster god Anansi, who claims to be the one who gave Buddy his powers, having disguised himself as the aliens (whilst reminding Vixen and Buddy that he constantly lies). Anansi also mentions that Buddy's new powers were a side effect of his manipulation of Earth's morphogenic field. After escaping the totem and defeating Anansi, Animal Man went back to the JLA Headquarters to thank the JLA for their aid. The Black Canary and Wonder Woman told Buddy that there is a seat for him in the JLA. Buddy declined, choosing to focus on his family and remain a part-timer. Buddy used the JLA teleporter to return home to his wife and children in San Diego.

=== Cry for Justice ===
Buddy appears in the second half of writer James Robinson's miniseries event Justice League: Cry for Justice. While he and his family are entertaining Starfire and Donna Troy, Buddy is approached by Mikaal Tomas and Congorilla, who ask him for help in tracking down the supervillain Prometheus. He accompanies them to the JLA Watchtower to seek help from the Justice League, and is present when Red Arrow is mauled by an unknown attacker. While searching for the Red Arrow's assailant, Buddy is assaulted by Prometheus disguised as Freddy Freeman.

During the finale, Buddy is seen helping Starfire and Firestorm rescue survivors after Prometheus destroys Star City.

=== Blackest Night ===
During the Blackest Night event, Nekron, the Lord of the Dead, reveals that all those who have returned from the dead, such as Buddy, were allowed to do so to become his "inside agents". A black power ring attaches itself to Buddy, canceling out his resurrection and transforming him into a Black Lantern. In the final battle, Animal Man is freed by the power of white light.

=== Starman/Congorilla ===
Following the events of Blackest Night, Buddy helps Starman and Congorilla during their search for the Fountain of Youth, using his abilities to help translate for Rex the Wonder Dog. Buddy is later revealed to be a member of the JLA's reserve team, and joins the League during their battle against Eclipso. Shortly after joining the battle, Buddy and his teammates are possessed by Eclipso. The reserve JLA members are all freed after Eclipso is defeated.

=== The New 52 ===
In The New 52, Buddy Baker has returned to his role as an environmental activist and actor. After his daughter Maxine manifests powers of her own, they journey into The Red, where they learn that Maxine must fight a battle between The Red and The Rot. The Baker Family travels cross country to unite with Swamp Thing. Buddy's son Cliff sacrifices himself in battle with The Rot.

Animal Man appears as a member of the Justice League of America. After the events in Justice League United, Animal Man takes a break to care for his family.

=== DC Rebirth ===
In 2017, after the events depicted in the series DC Rebirth, Animal Man became a reserve member of the new Justice League. He helped the Justice League alongside other new reserve members like Adam Strange and the Swamp Thing. In the aftermath of the Justice League: No Justice series Animal Man's name was mentioned in the new Justice League series by Wonder Woman. Animal Man was seen helping Vixen fix the Earth alongside the rest of the Justice League. He was later seen helping the Justice League fight the Legion of Doom and protecting a doorknob key from getting into the hands of the Legion. Animal Man was latterly seen with the rest of the Justice League, Justice League Dark, and the Teen Titans at a get-together party in the Hall of Justice.

Animal Man was summoned – along with the JLA, the Teen Titans and the JSA – by Batman to fix the Source Wall in anticipation of a forthcoming war across the multiverse. Animal Man then assisted these teams in a cross universe battle to defeat Perpetua and Lex Luthor's Legion of Doom.

During the "Dark Nights: Death Metal" storyline, Animal Man was among the prisoners in New Apokolips after The Batman Who Laughs and his Dark Knights took over Prime-Earth. They were freed when Wonder Woman, Batman, and Harley Quinn rescued Superman from the control of Darkfather. During the hero's fight with Robin King, Animal Man accompanied Red Tornado and Blue Beetle into battle against Robin King. However, Robin King kills Red Tornado, causing an explosion that kills Animal Man. Batman later revives him using a Black Lantern ring.

Animal Man then featured in a small cameo in Wonder Woman #780. Animal Man and other Justice League members were in the cafeteria having lunch. They were surprised to see Wonder Woman walk past them. She had returned to the Justice League following the events of the Dark Nights: Death Metal storyline series.

In DC Halloween Special, Animal Man works to protect his daughter Maxine from her classmates, who are bullying her because of her animal powers.

During the Titans: Beast World event, Animal Man attempts to help the Teen Titans battle the Necrostar. However, after Beast Boy turns into a Starro to fight the Necrostar, has his mind suppressed by Doctor Hate, and spreads spores around the world that transform people into animal hybrids, Animal Man is overwhelmed by the Red destabilizing and loses control of his powers.

Animal Man is seen in Batman: The Brave and the Bold #20, helping Maxine with her nightmares of animals in pain. Martian Manhunter helps Maxine to help her to get to her father. As Maxine connects with her father in the Red, he tells her that she will have to get used to the pain of animals eating each other to survive and that avatars have a calling to do what they can. Maxine's nightmares stop afterward. The next morning, John Jones (Martian Manhunter's alter ego) is invited to the Baker family for breakfast and is asked to stay awhile and help renovate their house.

Animal Man appears again in Justice League Unlimited, in the aftermath of the Dark Crisis series. In issue #21, he makes a background appearance wearing his 1980s orange suit, trailed by a flock of birds. During the series, Animal Man helps the Justice League hunt down the Brainiac Queen after her clash with the Superman Family, and he joins the team to fight off Despero the Conqueror. Animal Man's daughter Maxine Baker will be filling infor her father as (Animal Girl) meets up with Aquaman as she team ups with Swamp Thing protector of (The Green) and they are going to be helping Aquaman who is connected to the ocean of the blue In Emperor Aquaman issue #21.

== Powers and abilities ==
Buddy can mimic the abilities of any animal as a result of his encounter with a crashed alien spacecraft. He does this by either focusing on a specific animal near him, or, as he learns later, by drawing power from the animal kingdom in general (this enables him to even mimic extinct animals). The nature of these powers has been described in various ways, including the superficial "alien radiation" explanation of his early appearances, the reconstruction of his body by aliens with "morphogenetic grafts" at the cellular level, and, currently, mystical access to a "morphogenetic field" created by all living creatures, also known as "The Red". He does not grow wings to fly as a bird (instead he flies in classic "Superman style"), nor does he form gills to breathe underwater when mimicking a fish, but he has occasionally been known to mimic the actual appearances of animals, such as adopting the claws of a wolverine temporarily, or his metamorphosis toward the end of Delano's run on his series.

Among the "animal powers" Buddy has been known to use are:

- The strength of a Tyrannosaurus rex.
- The flight of a bird.
- The swimming ability of a fish.
- The speed of an ant.
- The reflexes of a fly.
- The eloquence of a parrot.
- The wall-crawling of a spider.
- The sonic blast of a pistol shrimp.
- The sense of smell of a moth.
- The stench of a skunk.
- The color changing of a chameleon.
- The agility of a snake.
- The playfulness of a kitten.
- The electricity of an electric eel and electric ray.
- The ability of a worm to re-grow lost body parts.
- The righteous anger of a mother bear.
- The bark of a large dog.
- The reproduction abilities of protozoa.
- The durability of a cockroach.
- The ability to "fire lightning from his face" from an unidentified alien creature.
- The beauty of a monarch butterfly.
- The smell of a hippopotamus.
- The napping ability of a cat.

The level of Buddy's abilities is proportional to the size of the animal they are drawn from. Hence, drawing the jumping ability from a flea would allow him to cover great distances. However, taking the abilities of a larger animal does not result in diminished power for him. In some appearances, he can also talk to animals and enter their minds.

Tapping into the Red, Animal Man can also fire blasts of force or unidentified energy. In cooperation with Vixen and the woman known as "Tristess", he helped to create an entire universe.

In 52, Buddy experiences an upgrade that allows him to connect to the universe's morphogenetic field, providing him unlimited access to all animals in the universe regardless of origin. At first, Animal Man knew nothing about the alien creatures whose abilities he took, but later has ample knowledge.

== Other versions ==
- Animal Man appears in JLA: The Nail as a prisoner of Cadmus Labs.
- Animal Man appears in The Last Days of Animal Man. This version lost his powers and subsequently retired.
- Animal Man appears in the "Flashpoint" event. This version was imprisoned at the Doom's prison after being framed for murdering his family. During a prison break, he is ordered to kill Heat Wave by the Atomic Skull before being killed by the former.
- Animal Man appears in the DC Black Label series Swamp Thing: Green Hell. This version died under unspecified circumstances, leading his family to move to Nanda Parbat.
- Animal Man appears in the Elseworlds comic, DC vs. Vampires: World War V. Buddy Baker is hunting animals in the wild when his family is turned into vampires and his family trick him, locking Buddy in the cell under the house allowing, Ellen and the children to roam free whilst Buddy as their prisoner.

== In other media ==
=== Television ===
- Animal Man appears in the Mad segment "That's What Super Friends Are For".
- Animal Man appears in a self-titled segment of DC Nation Shorts, voiced by "Weird Al" Yankovic. This version focuses on rescuing animals instead of people.
- Animal Man appears in the Teen Titans Go! episode "Forest Pirates".

=== Film ===
- Animal Man appears in DC Super Hero Girls: Super Hero High.
- Animal Man appears in Teen Titans Go! To the Movies.

=== Video games ===
- Animal Man appears in DC Universe Online.
- Animal Man appears as a character summon in Scribblenauts Unmasked: A DC Comics Adventure.

=== Miscellaneous ===
- Animal Man appears in Justice League Unlimited #21 and #29.
- Animal Man makes a cameo appearance in DC Super Hero Girls as a graduate of Super Hero High.
- Animal Man appears in Injustice 2. This version can shapeshift into animals. He initially supports Ra's al Ghul and the League of Assassins until Damian Wayne convinces him otherwise. Animal Man tries to escape the League's custody, but is killed by Ra's daughter Athanasia al Ghul.
