= Vandal Savage =

DC Comics supervillain

- Vandal Savage as depicted for the anthology comic book series DC Universe Presents (2012). Art by Bernard Chang.

Publication information
- Publisher: DC Comics
- First appearance: Green Lantern #10 (December 1943)
- Created by: Alfred Bester; Martin Nodell

In-story information
- Alter ego: Vandar Adg
- Species: Enhanced Cro-Magnon
- Team affiliations: Injustice Society; Abraxas Corporation; Tartarus; Secret Society of Super Villains; Demon Knights; Legion of Doom; Council of Immortals; Children of the Light
- Notable aliases: Khafre; Khufu; Alexander the Great; Julius Caesar; Genghis Khan; Blackbeard; Sauvage; Jon Savage; Burt Villers; Cain
- Abilities: Enhanced strength, speed, and durability; Immortality; Regeneration; Master martial artist and hand-to-hand combatant; Genius-level intellect; Master tactician, strategist, and field commander; Skilled swordsman and marksman

Vandal Savage (Vandar Adg) is a supervillain appearing in American comic books published by DC Comics. He is said to be a Cro-Magnon warrior who gained immortality and advanced healing abilities after encountering a strange meteorite during prehistoric times. For over 50,000 years, he plagues the Earth as a villain and occasional conqueror, sometimes using different names but most often calling himself Vandal Savage. He is a brilliant and sadistic tactician with immense knowledge in various sciences and forms of combat. Throughout history, his most frequent enemies are immortal or reincarnating heroes such as Immortal Man, Hawkman, Hawkgirl, and Resurrection Man. He is also a recurring foe of the Justice Society and the Justice League and occasionally works as a member of super-villain organizations such as the Injustice Society and the Legion of Doom.

Vandal Savage has been substantially adapted into media outside comics. He is voiced by Phil Morris in Justice League and Miguel Ferrer in Young Justice, with David Kaye replacing Ferrer following his death. Furthermore, Savage appears in media set in the Arrowverse, portrayed by Casper Crump.

== Publication history ==
Vandal Savage's debut in Green Lantern #10, art by Martin Nodell

Vandal Savage first appeared during the Golden Age of Comic Books in Green Lantern #10 (December 1943), created by writer Alfred Bester and artist Martin Nodell. In the story, he has pointed, demonic ears and reveals he is a million-year-old Cro-Magnon man who gained immortality from a special meteor. The story ends when the Green Lantern (Alan Scott) causes Savage to fall into a seemingly bottomless pit. Four years later, he made his second appearance in All Star Comics #37 (1947), where he joined the original Injustice Society, a team of villains that battled the Justice Society of America. The story featured Savage targeting Hawkman, who decades later would be established as one of Savage's most frequent enemies.

During the Silver Age of Comic Books, DC rebooted its universe of superheroes, altering some character histories while also creating new versions of familiar characters. The Silver Age version of the Flash (Barry Allen) and his contemporaries were later said to live in the universe of Earth-One. The Golden Age Flash, Golden Age Green Lantern, and the Justice Society of America were retroactively said to be inhabitants of Earth-Two, where their stories took place. This made Vandal Savage an inhabitant of Earth-Two as well.

Sixteen years after his second comic book story, Vandal Savage returned in The Flash #137 (June 1963). This comic established he was closer to 50 thousand years old than 1 million years old, and also revealed that his original name had been Vandar Adg. After this, he became a recurring enemy to the heroes of Earth-Two and Earth-One, sometimes crossing the dimensional barrier between the two realities. Frequently, he battled the Flashes and Superman. In Action Comics #515-516 (1981), the story indicated Vandal Savage was no longer just ageless but could also heal from any physical injury, even near disintegration. The story shows Savage seemingly reduced to ash by a meteorite, but Superman concludes the villain will still return. In Action Comics #542 (1983), this is proven correct, and Savage reveals his body was able to heal and reform even from near total destruction.

Two years after Vandal Savage's return to comics in the Silver Age, Strange Adventures #177 (1965) introduced a hero called the Immortal Man. Whenever the Immortal Man died or was killed, his powerful amulet allowed him to quickly materialize in a new body elsewhere on Earth, without having to literally be born again and with his memories intact. The Immortal Man initially appeared in four stories, then disappeared from comics for seventeen years. He returned in a two-part story in Action Comics #552–553 (1984), written by Marv Wolfman with art by Gil Kane. In this story, it was said the Immortal Man and Vandal Savage were archenemies across history and had been since before they had gained their powers. The Immortal Man's amulet was also revealed to be a piece of the same meteorite that made Savage immortal. The same story featured the Immortal Man forming a team of Forgotten Heroes to fight Savage.

During the crossover Crisis on Infinite Earths, the Immortal Man seemingly died, giving up his reincarnation energy to help save reality. As a result of this crossover, the histories of Earth-One and Earth-Two were merged and revised into a new, unified DC Universe, altering some character histories in the process. The crossover was followed by History of the DC Universe, a two-part mini-series intended to establish the basic history of the new timeline (although within a few years, several parts of it were already dismissed and contradicted by new stories). History of the DC Universe #1 established for the first time that Vandar Adg's people were known as the Blood Tribe (while the Immortal Man came from the Bear Tribe). The same issue showed that the meteor which made Vandal Savage immortal also enhanced his intelligence and altered his body, explaining why he resembled a modern Homo sapiens when other stories claimed he was originally Cro-Magnon.

Over time, new revelations were made about Vandal Savage, such as the fact that he kept track of his children and descendants in case he needed to harvest them for organs and replacement parts, since his ability to heal has weakened over time. The comic book series Resurrection Man said Savage and the Immortal Man were not made immortal by radiation or gases from the meteorite they encountered but by sub-atomic robots it carried called "tektites" that entered their bloodstreams. The same comic book series revealed that along with the Immortal Man, Savage has also regularly fought Mitchell Shelley, the Resurrection Man, across history. Likewise, it was revealed that Vandal Savage had regularly fought the reincarnating heroes Hawkman and Hawkgirl across many of their lives, sometimes being responsible for their deaths. The crossover Final Crisis depicts characters believing Vandal Savage is the inspiration for the story of Cain from the Bible.

In 2011, DC rebooted its history again with the New 52 timeline. In the New 52 series Demon Knights, it was said that Vandal Savage worked alongside several heroes and warriors during the Dark Ages, fighting evil rather than causing it. During these days, Savage is a mirthful, often drunk warrior who enjoys a fight as a break from boredom. In 2016, DC Rebirth restored much of the pre-New 52 history while making some new changes. The 2017 comic book Dark Days: The Forge and the 2018 series The Immortal Men establishes that Vandal Savage and the Immortal Man were part of the Council of Immortals, a group whose members gained immortality from the same meteor.

== Fictional character biography ==
=== Pre-Crisis ===
In his debut story, Vandal Savage manipulates the Green Lantern and his secret identity Alan Scott into helping his schemes, later revealing he knows they are the same person. Savage explains that he is "one million years old" and was once a Cro-Magnon man who was the chief of his tribe. After being exposed to gases from a meteor, Savage is rendered comatose for months and awakens to discover that he has gained eternal youth. Savage does not reveal his original name to the Green Lantern, but claims that over the years he has lived under many identities, including an ancient king of Sumer, Cheops, Julius Caesar, and Genghis Khan. When he realized he could still die from injury, he decided to no longer act as a public man of power and instead would serve as an advisor to powerful leaders including Napoleon Bonaparte, Otto von Bismarck, and Adolf Hitler; gaining resources and political influence while others could be the target for assassination. Now in the modern-day, he wishes to become a powerful figure in the government and war industry. In the end, he is defeated when Green Lantern opens a seemingly bottomless pit beneath him, causing him to fall out of sight.

Savage survives and is recruited into the original incarnation of the Injustice Society, a group dedicated to defeating the Justice Society of America. During this adventure, he targets and captures JSA member Hawkman. The Justice Society proves victorious, however, and Vandal Savage is imprisoned.

After 16 years of prison, Vandal Savage escapes and lures the Justice Society members out of retirement, capturing them. He accidentally attracts the attention of Barry Allen, who aids the older heroes against the villain. As a result, the Justice Society decides to return to semi-active duty. Savage is now said to be 50,000 years old rather than one million, and his original name is revealed to be Vandar Adg. The meteor that mutated him did so through radiation rather than exotic gases, and that it did not actually explode but warped through space and time. A later story reveals that a fragment of the same radioactive meteor is recovered by a caveman named Klarn, an enemy of Vandar Adg, who then makes it into an amulet. With this amulet, Klarn gains a unique reincarnation ability; every time he is killed or dies, he quickly reappears elsewhere on Earth in a new body, with his memories of all past lives intact.

Savage alters the history of Earth-One so that he has been its ruler for centuries, with Superman serving as his trusted enforcer. Realizing Savage is a cruel leader who censors news media so only good things are said about his rule, Superman joins the rebellion against the villain and then restores the original history. Traveling back in time to when he first gained his power, Savage is seemingly destroyed by the radiation of the meteor that made him immortal. Later, his body rebuilds itself from the ash, either due to his healing always being this powerful or because the meteor's radiation temporarily enhanced his immortal abilities. Deciding to conquer the world through technology, Savage remains on modern-day Earth-One and creates the technological research corporation Abraxas in Metropolis, pretending to be an altruistic scientist and businessman while secretly continuing his plans for conquest and battling Superman.

=== Post-Crisis ===
Following Crisis on Infinite Earths, several universes merged into one single timeline, creating a new version of history where the Justice Society and Justice League had always lived on the same Earth, with one team forming decades after the other. The post-Crisis version of Savage is more bloodthirsty, and it is suggested by some that he is the first cannibal on record in human history. As with the Silver Age stories, the meteor that made him immortal is one that travels by warping through space and time, now specifically said to have originated from the future. The meteor did not empower him through radiation but by infecting him with sub-atomic robots called tektites.

As he grows older, Savage realizes he has three human enemies who constantly reincarnate, though unlike the Immortal Man they do so in the traditional sense, needing to literally be reborn as children again following each death. Two of these enemies are known as Prince Khufu and his wife Chay-Ara in their original lives, fated to meet each other and fall in love in all subsequent lives. In the early 20th century, they are reborn as Carter Hall and Shiera Saunders, Hawkman and Hawkgirl. Vandal Savage compares the two reincarnating Hawk heroes to cockroaches. Savage's other reincarnating enemy is Mitchell Shelley, who is repeatedly reborn again and usually recalls the events of his past lives, leading him to remaining the same person. In many lives, Shelley fights Savage, becoming his most frequent enemy next to Immortal Man.

Vandal Savage claims to have been several noteworthy figures of history, but it has been shown that at least some of these boasts are false, a means of taking credit and seeming more important. At times he enjoys being a soldier for glory or a minor conqueror. More often, unwilling to test how much damage his immortality can repair, he is content to be an advisor behind the scenes. While temporarily living in ancient Atlantis, Savage founds a secret society known as the Children of the Light. This organization helps topple the power of Atlantis. Before the continent sinks, Savage's followers leave and spread across Earth, becoming known as the Illuminati. Savage serves as the group's secret leader for many years.

At some point after the retirement of the JSA, Vandal Savage fathers a daughter whom he names Scandal. As with many children he has had over the centuries, Vandal dismisses any notions of love or affection towards Scandal. However, he comes to admire her warrior spirit and talent for violence, leading him to protect her at times in the hopes that she will one day provide an even more formidable heir whom he can use.

Soon after the Crisis on Infinite Earths, Savage captures the Immortal Man. He then funds the Lab, a group attempting to recreate the tektites that make the villain immortal. The Lab experiments on blood samples taken from both Savage and the Immortal Man, hoping to understand the sub-atomic technology. By this time, Mitchell Shelley has reincarnated, now living as a lawyer in Viceroy, South Carolina. Though suffering from visions and dreams of his past lives, Shelley is unable to learn the full truth of his past before he is targeted for death by enemies. Though he survives, he wanders the streets, brain-damaged and amnesiac. Later, he is coincidentally kidnapped by the Lab, as Savage's organization is now testing tektites by injecting it into homeless people and seeing if they survive lethal injuries. Shelley's ability to reincarnate and remember his past lives seems to interact with the tektites, giving him the ability to continuously resurrect himself after death and gain a new superpower each time he does. After escaping the Lab, Shelley's memories return in part, and he recalls his long-time rivalry with Vandal Savage.

Soon before the events of Infinite Crisis, Vandal Savage joins the newly reorganized Secret Society of Super Villains (now simply calling itself "the Society"). Meanwhile, his now-adult daughter Scandal Savage joins the newest Secret Six, a team that opposes the Society's agenda. Savage later reveals that he believes Scandal and her Secret Six teammate Catman would produce a suitable and formidable heir. Scandal, however, is romantically involved with Knockout. Seeing this as defiance, Savage threatens Knockout and the team.

Vandal Savage becomes leader of a doomsday cult and endows his followers with a variety of superhuman abilities using a serum based on his own blood (though they lose these abilities without regular injections). His recruit Fantasia then casts illusions to trick the Flash into bringing Savage an alien "Summoner" device. Deciding that the planet is overpopulated and no longer an enjoyable place for him to live, Savage intends to use the Summoner to force the Thanatos asteroid to crash to Earth, causing an apocalypse event and "thinning out the herd" of the human race. The Flash reverses the effect of the device, pushing the asteroid away, but then Savage leaps into the path of the beam, believing he will gain greater power from the asteroid just as a meteor once gave him power before. As he is sent to the asteroid, he declares that he will protect the Flash and his family and heirs as thanks for Wally West's help in his achievement of new power. As Savage vanishes, his followers are rounded up and their abilities fade. Savage's immortality allows him to survive on the meteor and he later returns to Earth by "hitching a ride" on a comet that is headed in that direction.

Savage later returns as the mastermind behind a group of superhuman Neo-Nazis called the Fourth Reich, targeting the heirs of several Golden Age superheroes. They kill the heroes Minute-Man, General Glory, and Mister America (Trey Thompson), along with their families. The Fourth Reich kills nearly all of Commander Steel's family. The battle ends when the Fourth Reich is defeated and Savage is struck down by a fire truck.

=== Final Crisis ===
In Final Crisis: Revelations, the Order of the Stone (who worship Cain) comes in possession of the Spear of Destiny, a magical item which Hitler once used to keep superheroes from entering Nazi-occupied territories. They plunge the Spear into Savage's body, causing the spirit of Cain to be reborn in him. Using the Spear, Savage/Cain separates the Spectre, the Spirit of Vengeance, from his human host, then enslaves him. Savage's plans are undone by Renee Montoya, the vigilante known as the Question, who manages to steal the Spear and reunite the Spectre with his host. The Spectre sentences Savage to walk the Earth, unable to disguise the Mark of Cain on his face, to be reviled and denied rest until God says otherwise. Savage rids himself of the Mark of Cain by passing it on to Montoya. However, Montoya removes the Mark of Cain from herself by acknowledging her flaws and shortcomings.

=== The New 52 ===
In 2011, "The New 52" rebooted the DC universe. Vandal Savage gained immortality and superhuman strength by encountering a small meteorite that broke off from a radioactive comet that passed by Earth. Savage later learns that this meteor nearly struck Krypton before, but was deflected by an ancestor of Superman's. During the Dark Ages and the time of King Arthur, Savage joins with Etrigan the Demon, Madame Xanadu, and Shining Knight to form the Demon Knights, fighting powerful forces that threaten humanity. Savage himself does this not out of altruism but to avoid boredom and test his might.

Savage is later depicted as a villain free of imprisonment. After Superman's identity is exposed and he finds himself losing his powers, Superman eventually learns that Savage is responsible for his power drain after somehow infecting Superman with a form of radiation that hinders his body's ability to absorb sunlight. After capturing most of the Justice League and stealing Superman's Fortress of Solitude, Savage reveals that the comet which empowered him before will be passing by Earth again, and he intends to collect it with the aid of some of his mortal descendants, all of whom gain power as the comet approaches. Reaching the comet, he gains greater power and attempts to recruit Superman to his side after Superman is able to cure himself of the radiation inhibiting his powers through a risky form of kryptonite "chemotherapy". Rejecting Savage's offer, Superman sends the comet away, causing Savage to revert to his default form and power level.

=== DC Rebirth ===
In 2016, DC Comics implemented another relaunch of its books called DC Rebirth, which restored its continuity to a form much as it was prior to The New 52. In the new history, Vandal Savage is one of a group of five people who are made immortal by a radioactive meteorite that fell to Earth many thousands of years before recorded history. This group becomes the Council of Immortals, hoping to shape the human race from the shadows. Each of these immortals, including Savage, can share their ability to stop aging with others, creating many followers down through the centuries.

In the modern day, Vandal Savage attempts to create a new Injustice Gang, but his plans are thwarted by Lex Luthor, who decides to form his own Legion of Doom. Luthor seemingly beats Savage to death with a doorknob made from a piece of the Totality, the oldest energy source in existence and one of the few things that can successfully kill him.

At the conclusion of Dark Nights: Death Metal, Vandal Savage has been restored to the present day, becoming a member of the joint hero/villain collaboration on the space station "The Totality".

In the aftermath of the storyline "Gotham War", Savage takes up residence in Gotham City, as he will lose his immortality if he leaves the city. Over time, Savage becomes Gotham City's police commissioner, working with Gotham mayor Poison Ivy and the newly-created unit TUCO (Tactical Urban Combat Officers) against Batman. In the subsequent storyline "Bad Seeds", Savage turns against Ivy, leading to a conflict between them and against Batman. After Ivy loses her powers, Savage takes over her position as mayor and declares martial law. However, Savage is ambushed and apparently killed by Killer Croc, who beheads him.

== Powers and abilities ==
Vandal Savage's long life has allowed him to become a master of hand-to-hand combat, an expert in military tactics and a variety of weapons, and familiar with many cultures, languages, and fields of science. His choice of weaponry changes depending on the battle. Sometimes he employs swords, knives, and maces, while other times he wields advanced technology, such as energy-based weapons, a suit that allows him limited flight, or a pen-sized sonic device that can immobilize people with super-speed.

In the original Golden Age and Silver Age stories, Vandal Savage was ageless but could still die by injury, which is the traditional definition of immortality. Over time, he began gradually aging and then lost his immortality completely in the twentieth century before finding a way to regain it. For a brief time when he existed out of phase with his home dimension of Earth-Two, Savage was able to mentally project messages and images.

Starting in the 1980s, Savage was depicted not only as ageless but also having superhuman healing abilities, meaning his body could repair itself from lethal damage and destruction. He also exhibited greater strength, speed, reflexes, resiliency to injury, and tolerance to pain than the average human being. In the 1990s, it was revealed that the source of his power was not radiation-induced mutation but a colony of sub-atomic robots called "tektites" inhabiting his bloodstream and cells. These tektites work to preserve and rebuild his body by any means necessary. Over time, this immortality has weakened, and Savage has had to rely on his children, descendants, or clones for organ replacement and blood transfusions. He has also funded research into tektite replication.

During the Final Crisis crossover event, Savage bore the metaphysical "Mark of Cain" on his face. Though the mark could vanish if the bearer recognized their own shortcomings and flaws, Savage did not realize this and passed it on to another person.

In the New 52 timeline, Savage was mutated by radiation from a passing comet, one which had almost destroyed the planet Krypton years before. This gave him not only immortality and advanced healing, but also superhuman strength. When Savage later encountered the comet again, his proximity to it increased his power, giving him flight, organic armor, and an energy field of an unknown nature. When the comet was destroyed, Savage apparently lost these extra abilities.

== Children ==
Over the millennia, Savage has occasionally fathered children and has many descendants alive on Earth. One such descendant is Roy Harper. Savage's more recent children who still live include his daughter Scandal Savage (the only one of his children he considers his true heir) and Cliff DeWitt, who helps run the clandestine organization known as the Lab (which gave the Resurrection Man his powers). The demon Grendel, famously known for his role in the story of Beowulf, is also apparently a child of Vandal Savage. Grendel refers to Savage as "Cain", a reference to the first murderer in the Bible.

The New 52 version of Vandal Savage also fathered Kassidy Sage, an FBI agent, and Angelo Bend, also known as Angle Man.

== Other versions ==
=== DC One Million ===
An older future version of Vandal Savage from the 853rd century appears in DC One Million. This Savage was noticeably older than his 20th-century counterpart and is no longer truly immortal. This version of Savage was later permanently killed by a nuclear explosion.

=== Star Trek/Legion of Super-Heroes ===
Vandal Savage appears in the Star Trek/Legion of Super-Heroes crossover, co-published by DC Comics and IDW Publishing in 2011. This version is a parallel universe version of Flint, a mysterious immortal previously encountered by James T. Kirk and his crew. (Note: As depicted in the Star Trek: The Original Series episode "Requiem for Methuselah".)

=== The Multiversity ===
An alternate universe version of Vandal Savage appears in The Multiversity. This version is an inter-dimensional pirate from Earth-40, a world resembling the 1930s and ruled by pulp fiction-style villains.

=== DC x Sonic the Hedgehog: Metal Legion ===
Vandal Savage appears in DC x Sonic the Hedgehog: Metal Legion #2, in which he allied himself with Deadly Six leader Zavok.

== In other media ==
=== Television ===
Casper Crump as Vandal Savage in the Arrowverse crossover "Heroes Join Forces".

- Vandal Savage appears in Justice League, voiced by Phil Morris. This version is approximately twenty-five thousand years old. Additionally, a potential future version of Savage from a post-apocalyptic future where he devastated Earth appears in the episode "Hereafter". After Superman prevents the past Savage from devastating Earth and alters the timeline, the future Savage is erased from existence.
- A character inspired by Vandal Savage named Curtis Knox appears in the Smallville episode "Cure", portrayed by Dean Cain. Similar to Savage, Knox is a centuries-old immortal, and is additionally implied to have lived as Napoleon and Jack the Ripper and been a member of the Nazi Party. Additionally, he was originally referred to as Vandal Savage in the script, but the producers were prevented from using the name.
- Vandal Savage appears in Young Justice, voiced by Miguel Ferrer in the first two seasons and subsequently by David Kaye following Ferrer's death. This version is the leader of the Light and a Mongolian Cro-Magnon from the Pleistocene who sports facial scars from a previous encounter with a cave bear. In the 10th and 13th centuries, Savage encountered and formed alliances with Klarion the Witch Boy and Darkseid respectively and went on to become the ancestor of Nabu and the Homo magi and Atlantean races through his grandson Arion. As of the present, he and Klarion, among others, founded the Light based on a survival of the fittest mentality, with Savage believing that the Justice League is stopping humanity from evolving further.
- Vandal Savage appears in media set in the Arrowverse, portrayed by Casper Crump. This version originated as Hath-Set, an Egyptian priest who became immortal after being exposed to dark matter ore from Thanagarian meteorites and spent the succeeding millennia reinventing himself as Vandal Savage, hunting Prince Khufu and Priestess Chay-Ara's reincarnations to strengthen himself, and mentoring esteemed conquerors such as Per Degaton.
  - First appearing in the crossover event "Heroes Join Forces", Savage obtains the Staff of Horus and attempts to kill Khufu and Chay-Ara's current reincarnations, Carter Hall and Kendra Saunders, only to be temporarily killed by them, the Flash, the Green Arrow, and the latter pair's allies before Malcolm Merlyn collects Savage's ashes.
  - A future incarnation of Savage appears in Legends of Tomorrow. In the first season, he allies with the Time Masters, who believe he is the only one who can thwart a Thanagarian invasion in 2166. However, rogue Time Master Rip Hunter forms the Legends to kill Savage in retaliation for Savage killing his family. After the Legends kill the Time Masters, Savage attempts to create a temporal paradox by detonating Thanagarian meteorites in three different time periods, but the radiation renders him and his past selves mortal again. The Legends eventually destroy the meteorites while Saunders and Hunter kill Savage.

=== Film ===
- Vandal Savage appears in Justice League: Doom, voiced again by Phil Morris. This version is a ~80,000 year old Sumatran and formed the Legion of Doom in a failed attempt to kill the Justice League.
- Vandal Savage appears in Lego DC Comics Super Heroes: Justice League – Cosmic Clash, voiced again by Phil Morris.
- Vandal Savage appears in Suicide Squad: Hell to Pay, voiced by Jim Pirri. This version previously lived as Alexander the Great, Julius Caesar, and Genghis Khan. He retrieves a "Get Out Of Hell Free" card under the belief that a metahuman will find a way to kill him despite his immortality, which will lead to him suffering for thousands of years of sin and murder, and tasks Professor Pyg with surgically implanting it in his chest in such a way that any attempt to remove it will kill him and expend its magic. After a battle with the Suicide Squad, Savage is killed after Professor Zoom phases the card out of his body.

=== Video games ===
- Vandal Savage appears as a non-playable character (NPC) in DC Universe Online, voiced by Brian Talbot.
- Vandal Savage appears as a character summon in Scribblenauts Unmasked: A DC Comics Adventure.
- Vandal Savage, based on the Arrowverse incarnation, appears as an unlockable playable character in Lego DC Super-Villains via the "DC TV Super-Villains" DLC pack.

=== Miscellaneous ===
Vandal Savage appears in Superman & Batman Magazine #2.

== Reception ==
In 2009, Vandal Savage was ranked as IGN's 36th-greatest comic book villain of all time.
