= Greg Potter =

American comic book writer

- Born: Gregory Paul Potter
- Area: Writer
- Notable works: Jemm, Son of Saturn; Wonder Woman

Gregory Paul Potter is an American comic book writer best known for co-creating the DC Comics series Jemm, Son of Saturn with artist Gene Colan.

== Biography ==
Greg Potter began writing comics stories for Warren Publishing's black-and-white horror comics magazines in 1971, while still a teenager. His first work for DC Comics was the seven-page short story "Do You Believe In...?" published in House of Mystery #259 (July–Aug. 1978). His story "Papa Don" in Secrets of Haunted House #17 (Oct. 1979) was included in DC's "Top Ten Stories of 1979" collection. He stopped writing comics while attending Trinity College in Hartford, Connecticut, but returned to the industry in 1984. That year, Potter created Jemm, a character originally conceived as the cousin of the extraterrestrial superhero the Martian Manhunter, a long-running character that had not been in use for some time. Partway through developing the series, Potter was told by editor Janice Race that the Martian Manhunter character would reappear in the Justice League of America title. To avoid any continuity problems, Potter rewrote the series as Jemm, Son of Saturn, a character with no connection to the Martian Manhunter. The series was penciled by Gene Colan and inked by Klaus Janson and Bob McLeod. The Jemm character appeared in the "Human for a Day" episode of the Supergirl television series in 2015 and was portrayed by actor Charles Halford.

Potter and Race spent several months working on new concepts for the mid-1980s relaunch of Wonder Woman, before being joined by artist and co-plotter George Pérez. Potter left DC after completing the second issue of the new series to continue his career in advertising and was replaced by Len Wein.

== Bibliography ==
=== DC Comics ===
- All-Star Squadron Annual #3 ("Jemm, Son of Saturn" preview) (1984)
- DC Graphic Novel #5 ("Me & Joe Priest") (1985)
- House of Mystery #259, 261, 275 (1978–1979)
- Jemm, Son of Saturn #1–12 (1984–1985)
- Secrets of Haunted House #17 (1979)
- Wonder Woman vol. 2 #1–2 (1987)

=== Fantagraphics ===
- The Comics Journal #47, 53, 59, 63, 67, 71, 94 (1979–1984)

=== Warren Publishing ===
- Comix International #1, 3–4 (1974–1976)
- Creepy #46, 52–53, 66, 82, 123, 136 (1972–1982)
- Eerie #36, 44, 47, 57–58, 86 (1971–1977)
- Vampirella #20 (1972)
- Warren Presents #13 (1981)

Preceded by Trina Robbins and Kurt Busiek	Wonder Woman writer 1987	Succeeded by Len Wein
