= DC Comics Presents =

Comic book series

- Cover of DC Comics Presents #1 (July–August 1978), art by José Luis García-López and Dan Adkins.

Publication information
- Publisher: DC Comics
- Schedule: Bi-monthly (#1–2); Monthly (#3–97)
- Format: Ongoing series
- Publication date: July/August 1978 – September 1986
- No. of issues: 97, plus 4 Annuals
- Main character: Superman

Creative team
- Written by: List: Martin Pasko Len Wein Cary Bates Gerry Conway Paul Levitz Dennis O'Neil Bob Rozakis Roy Thomas Marv Wolfman Paul Kupperberg Alan Moore Steve Gerber
- Penciller: List: José Luis García-López Murphy Anderson Dick Dillin Joe Staton Rich Buckler Jim Starlin Irv Novick Alex Saviuk George Pérez Jack Kirby Rick Veitch Curt Swan
- Inker: List: Jack Abel Dick Giordano Frank McLaughlin Romeo Tanghal Kurt Schaffenberger Bob Smith Joe Giella Al Williamson
- Colorist: Gene D'Angelo

DC Comics Presents is a comic book series published by DC Comics from 1978 to 1986 which ran for 97 issues and four Annuals. It featured team-ups between Superman and a wide variety of other characters in the DC Universe. A recurring back-up feature "Whatever Happened to...?" had stories revealing the status of various minor and little-used characters.

== Publication history ==
DC Comics Presents debuted with a July/August 1978 cover date and was edited by Julius Schwartz. The series was launched with a team-up of Superman and the Flash by writer Martin Pasko and artist José Luis García-López. The winner of the DC Comics Presents letter column name contest appeared in the Superman/Hawkman story in issue #11 (July 1979). The "Whatever Happened to...?" backup feature began in issue #25 (Sept. 1980) and would appear in most issues for the next two years until its last installment in issue #48 (Aug. 1982). Issue #26 included an insert introduction story to the then-upcoming New Teen Titans series by Marv Wolfman and George Pérez. Len Wein and Jim Starlin co-created the supervillain Mongul in issue #27 (Nov. 1980) as part of a three-issue storyline. Another insert in issue #41 previewed the "new direction" Wonder Woman. In issue #47, Superman traveled to Eternia and met the Masters of the Universe. Ambush Bug made his first appearance in issue #52 (Dec. 1982) and made additional appearances in issues #59 and 81. The Superman/Challengers of the Unknown tale in issue #84 was drawn by Jack Kirby and Alex Toth. The series also contained the Alan Moore Superman/Swamp Thing story "The Jungle Line" in DC Comics Presents #85 (Sept. 1985), pencilled by Rick Veitch and inked by Al Williamson. Issue #87 featured the first appearance and origin of Superboy-Prime. The last issue is an exception to the team-up format, instead featuring Superman in an "Untold Tale" involving the Phantom Zone by Steve Gerber, following up as the conclusion to Gerber's previous limited series of the same title.

In 2004, the title DC Comics Presents was revived for eight one-shot issues, each a tribute to Schwartz, who had recently died. Each issue featured two stories based on a classic DC Comics cover of the past, reflecting Schwartz's frequent practice of commissioning a cover concept, then telling the writers to create a story about that cover.

In 2010, DC launched a new DC Comics Presents, a line of 100-page reprint issues reprinting stories that have not seen print since their original publication.

== Featured team-ups ==
Issue	Character(s)
#1	Flash
#2	Flash
#3	Adam Strange
#4	Metal Men
#5	Aquaman
#6	Green Lantern
#7	Red Tornado
#8	Swamp Thing
#9	Wonder Woman
#10	Sgt. Rock
#11	Hawkman
#12	Mister Miracle
#13	Legion of Super-Heroes
#14	Superboy
#15	Atom
#16	Black Lightning (Note: Also appeared as a member of the Outsiders in issue #83.)
#17	Firestorm
#18	Zatanna
#19	Batgirl
#20	Green Arrow
#21	Elongated Man (Note: Also appeared as a member of the Elastic Four in issue #93.)
#22	Captain Comet
#23	Doctor Fate
#24	Deadman
#25	Phantom Stranger
#26	Green Lantern
#27	Martian Manhunter
#28	Supergirl
#29	Spectre
#30	Black Canary
#31	Robin
#32	Wonder Woman
#33	Captain Marvel
#34	Marvel Family
#35	Man-Bat
#36	Starman
#37	Hawkgirl
#38	Flash
#39	Plastic Man
#40	Metamorpho
#41	Joker
#42	Unknown Soldier
#43	Legion of Super-Heroes
#44	Dial H for Hero
#45	Firestorm
#46	Global Guardians
#47	Masters of the Universe
#48	Aquaman
#49	Captain Marvel
#50	Clark Kent
#51	Atom
#52	Doom Patrol
#53	House of Mystery
#54	Green Arrow
#55	Air Wave
#56	Power Girl
#57	Atomic Knights
#58	Elongated Man
#58	Robin
#59	Legion of Substitute Heroes
#60	Guardians of the Universe
#61	OMAC
#62	Freedom Fighters
#63	Amethyst, Princess of Gemworld
#64	Kamandi
#65	Madame Xanadu
#66	Etrigan the Demon
#67	Santa Claus
#68	Vixen
#69	Blackhawk
#70	Metal Men
#71	Bizarro
#72	Phantom Stranger, Joker
#73	Flash
#74	Hawkman
#75	Arion
#76	Wonder Woman
#77	Forgotten Heroes
#78	Forgotten Villains
#79	Clark Kent
#80	Legion of Super-Heroes
#81	Ambush Bug
#82	Adam Strange
#83	Batman and the Outsiders
#84	Challengers of the Unknown
#85	Swamp Thing
#86	Supergirl
#87	Superboy-Prime
#88	Creeper
#89	Omega Men
#90	Firestorm
#90	Captain Atom
#91	Captain Comet
#92	Vigilante
#93	Elastic Four (Note: The Elastic Four was a one-time unofficial team made up of Plastic Man, the Elongated Man, Elastic Lad and the Malleable Man.)
#94	Harbinger, Lady Quark, Pariah
#95	Hawkman
#96	Blue Devil
#97	Phantom Zone villains
Annual #1	Superman (Earth-Two)
Annual #2	Superwoman
Annual #3	Captain Marvel
Annual #4	Superwoman

== Characters featured in the "Whatever Happened to...?" back-up series ==
Issue	Character(s)
#25	Hourman
#26	Sargon the Sorcerer
#27	Congorilla
#28	Johnny Thunder (John Tane) and Madame .44
#29	Doctor Mid-Nite
#30	Atom
#31	Robotman
#32	Mark Merlin and Prince Ra-Man
#33	Star Hawkins
#35	Rex the Wonder Dog
#37	Rip Hunter
#38	Crimson Avenger
#39	Richard Dragon
#40	Air Wave
#42	Sandman
#47	Sandy
#48	Black Pirate

Writer Mike Tiefenbacher had several proposals for other "Whatever Happened to...?" stories. These included Captain Action, Blackhawk, Genius Jones, Nighthawk, Ragman, the Sea Devils, Silent Knight, and Wildcat.

== Julius Schwartz tribute ==
In September and October 2004, the title DC Comics Presents was revived for a series of eight one-shot issues, each a tribute to DC editor Julius Schwartz, who had died the previous February. Each issue featured two stories based on a classic DC Comics cover of the past, reflecting Schwartz's frequent practice of commissioning a cover concept, then telling the writers to create a story about that cover.

DC Comics Presents:	Date	Notes
DC Comics Presents: Batman #1	September 2004	Cover art by Adam Hughes is a homage to the cover of Batman #183 (August 1966).
DC Comics Presents: Green Lantern #1	September 2004	Cover art by Brian Bolland is a homage to the cover of Green Lantern #31 (September 1964).
DC Comics Presents: Hawkman #1	September 2004	Cover art by José Luis García-López and Kevin Nowlan is a homage to the cover of Hawkman #6 (February–March 1965).
DC Comics Presents: Mystery in Space #1	September 2004	Cover art by Alex Ross is a homage to the cover of Mystery in Space #82 (March 1963).
DC Comics Presents: Flash #1	October 2004	Cover art by Alex Ross is a homage to The Flash #163 (August 1966).
DC Comics Presents: Justice League of America #1	October 2004	Cover art by José Luis García-López is a homage to Justice League of America #53 (May 1967).
DC Comics Presents: Superman #1	October 2004	Cover art by Adam Hughes is a homage to the cover of Superman #264 (June 1973).
DC Comics Presents: The Atom #1	October 2004	Cover art by Brian Bolland is a homage to the cover of The Atom #10 (December 1963 – January 1964).

== 2010 revival ==
In 2010, DC launched a new DC Comics Presents series featuring stories that have not seen print since their original publication. The issues are:

- DC Comics Presents: Batman #1 (October 2010), which spotlights Batman and reprints Batman #582–585 (10/20/2010).
- DC Comics Presents: Batman #2 (November 2010), reprints Batman #591–594 (11/17/2010).
- DC Comics Presents: Batman #3 (December 2010), reprints Batman #595–598 (12/15/2010).
- DC Comics Presents: Brightest Day #1, which spotlights Deadman and Hawkman and reprints selected stories from Hawkman #27, 34 and 36, Solo #8, DCU Holiday '09 and Strange Adventures #205.
- DC Comics Presents: Brightest Day #2, which spotlights Martian Manhunter and Firestorm and reprints Martian Manhunter #24 and Firestorm #11–13.
- DC Comics Presents: Brightest Day #3, which spotlights the Aquaman, Batman, Joker, and the Teen Titans, reprinting Legends of the DC Universe #26–27 and Teen Titans (2003-2011) #27–28.
- DC Comics Presents: Ethan Van Sciver, which spotlights the art of Ethan Van Sciver and reprints Batman and Catwoman: Trail of the Gun #1–2.
- DC Comics Presents: The Flash and Green Lantern: Faster Friends, which spotlights Green Lantern (Kyle Rayner) and the Flash (Wally West) and reprints both issues of the titular miniseries.
- DC Comics Presents: Green Lantern, which spotlights Green Lantern (Kyle Rayner) and Jade and reprints Green Lantern (vol. 3) #137–140.
- DC Comics Presents: Jack Cross, which spotlights Jack Cross and reprints issues #1–4 of his self-titled series.
- DC Comics Presents: J. H. Williams III, which spotlights the art of J. H. Williams III and reprints Chase #1 and 6–8.
- DC Comics Presents: Legion of Super-Heroes #1, which spotlights Dan Abnett and Andy Lanning's re-invention of the Legion of Super-Heroes leading into Legion Lost and reprints Legion of Super-Heroes (vol. 4) #122-123 and Legionnaires #79-80.
- DC Comics Presents: Legion of Super-Heroes #2, which spotlights Geoff Johns and reprints Adventure Comics #0-4, Action Comics #864 and 900 and the Mon-El story from Action Comics Annual #10.
- DC Comics Presents: Superman #1, which spotlights Superman and reprints Superman #179-180 and 185 and Superman: The Man of Steel #121.
- DC Comics Presents: Superman #2, reprints Superman: The Man of Steel #133, Superman #189, The Adventures of Superman #611 and Action Comics #798.
- DC Comics Presents: Superman #3, reprints Superman #177–178 and 181–182.
- DC Comics Presents: Superman #4, reprints Action Comics #768 and 771–773.
- DC Comics Presents: Young Justice #1, which spotlights Young Justice and reprints JLA: World without Grown-Ups #1–2.
- DC Comics Presents: Young Justice #2, reprints Young Justice Secret Files and Origins #1, Young Justice in No Man's Land, and Young Justice: The Secret.
- Vertigo Resurrected, which contains a controversial and previously unpublished Hellblazer story by Warren Ellis.

== Collected editions ==
- Showcase Presents DC Comics Presents: Superman Team-Ups Vol. 1 includes DC Comics Presents #1–26, 512 pages, November 2009, 1-4012-2535-7
- Showcase Presents DC Comics Presents: Superman Team-Ups Vol. 2 includes DC Comics Presents #27–50 and Annual #1, 512 pages, July 2013, 978-1-4012-4048-6
- Superman vs. Flash includes DC Comics Presents #1–2, 208 pages, May 2005, 978-1401204563
- Adventures of Superman: José Luis García-López includes DC Comics Presents #1–4, 17, 20, 24, and 31, 360 pages, April 2013, 978-1-4012-3856-8
- Superman's Greatest Team-Ups includes DC Comics Presents #5, 9–10, 12, 14, 19, 28, 30, 35, 38–39, 45, 50, 58, 63, 67, 71, 97; 400 pages, April 2021, 978-1779504869
- Superman in the Seventies includes DC Comics Presents #14, 224 pages, November 2000, 1-56389-638-9
- Deadman Omnibus includes DC Comics Presents #24, 944 pages, December 2020, 978-1779504883
- The Phantom Stranger Omnibus includes DC Comics Presents #25 and 72; 1,184 pages, May 2022, ISBN 978-1779506030
- The New Teen Titans Archives Vol. 1 includes the New Teen Titans story from DC Comics Presents #26, 240 pages, February 1999, 978-1563894855
- The New Teen Titans Omnibus Vol. 1 includes the New Teen Titans story from DC Comics Presents #26, 684 pages, September 2011, 978-1401231088
- Superman in the Eighties includes DC Comics Presents #29, 192 pages, April 2006, 1-4012-0952-1
- The Spectre: The Wrath of the Spectre Omnibus includes DC Comics Presents #29, 680 pages, September 2020, 978-1779502933
- Legends of the Dark Knight: José Luis García-López includes DC Comics Presents #31 and 41, 472 pages, November 2021, 978-1779505804
- Superman vs. Shazam! includes DC Comics Presents #33–34, 49, and Annual #3, 192 pages, March 2013, 978-1-4012-3821-6
- Superman vs. Shazam! includes DC Comics Presents #33–34, 49, and Annual #3, 256 pages, March 2021, 978-1779509093
- Joker: The Bronze Age Omnibus includes DC Comics Presents #41, 72; 832 pages, August 2019, 978-1401293406
- Wonder Woman: 80 Years of the Amazon Warrior - The Deluxe Edition includes DC Comics Presents #41, 416 pages, August 2021, 978-1779511577
- DC Through the 80s: The End of Eras includes DC Comics Presents Annual #1, 520 pages, December 2020, 978-1779500878
- Showcase Presents Ambush Bug Vol. 1 includes DC Comics Presents #52, 59, and 81, 488 pages, March 2009, 1-4012-2180-7
- Shazam! The Greatest Stories Ever Told includes DC Comics Presents Annual #3, 224 pages, February 2008, 978-1401216740
- Adventures of Superman: Gil Kane includes DC Comics Presents Annual #3, 392 pages, January 2013, 978-1-4012-3674-8
- Batman and the Outsiders Vol. 3 includes DC Comics Presents #83, 288 pages, April 2019, 978-1401287641
- The Greatest Team-Up Stories Ever Told includes DC Comics Presents #85, 288 pages, December 1989, 978-0930289515
- DC Universe by Alan Moore includes DC Comics Presents #85, 464 pages, March 2012, 1-4012-3339-2
- Superman: Back In Action includes DC Comics Presents # 4, 17 and 24. 143 pages. January 2007. 978-1-4012-1263-6
- Superman vs Mongul includes DC Comics Presents # 27, 28, 36 and 43. 144 pages. December 2013. 9781401242565
- Superman: Past And Future includes DC Comics Presents Annual # 2. 192 pages. December 2008. 9781401219345
- Swamp Thing: The Bronze Age Vol. 2 includes DC Comics Presents # 8. 448 pages. January 2020. 9781401294229
- The DC Universe by Len Wein includes DC Comics Presents # 27, 28 and 29. 384 pages. February 2019. 9781401287870
- DC Universe vs The Masters Of The Universe includes DC Comics Presents # 47. 160 pages. August 2014. 9781401247201
- Shazam!: A Celebration Of 75 Years includes DC Comics Presents # 49. 397 pages. April 2015. 9781401255381
- Adventures Of Superman: George Perez includes DC Comics Presents # 61. 448 pages. May 2020. 9781779500120
- Superman: Escape From Bizarro World includes DC Comics Presents # 71. 160 pages. May 2008. 9781401220334
- Crisis On Infinite Earths Companion: Deluxe Edition Vol. 1 includes DC Comics Presents # 78. 512 pages. November 2018. 9781401274597
- Crisis On Infinite Earths Companion: Deluxe Edition Vol. 2 includes DC Comics Presents # 86. 560 pages. May 2019. 9781401289218
- Crisis On Infinite Earths Companion: Deluxe Edition Vol. 3 includes DC Comics Presents # 87, 88, 94 and 95 . 536 pages. October 2019. 9781401294489
- Superboy: A Celebration Of 75 Years includes DC Comics Presents # 87. 440 pages. July 2020. 9781779503152
- Superman: Phantom Zone includes DC Comics Presents # 97. 160 pages. July 2013. 9781401240516
- Robin: The Bronze Age Omnibus includes DC Comics Presents # 31 and 58. 912 pages. March 2020. 9781779500854

== See also ==
- Super-Team Family
- Marvel Comics Presents
