= Forgotten Heroes =

DC Comics superhero team

- The Forgotten Heroes as depicted in Action Comics #553 (March 1984). Art by Gil Kane.

Publication information
- Publisher: DC Comics
- First appearance: Action Comics #545 (July 1983)
- Created by: Marv Wolfman (writer); Gil Kane (artist)

In-story information
- Member(s): Animal Man; Ballistic; Cave Carson; Dolphin; Fetish; The Ray; Resurrection Man; Vigilante (Pat Trayce)

The Forgotten Heroes are a fictional superhero team in the DC Comics universe. The group is composed of originally unrelated superheroes introduced in DC publications in the 1940s, 1950s and 1960s. Having faded from appearances in DC publications, Marv Wolfman and Gil Kane brought them together in Action Comics #545 (July 1983) as a team that had simply faded from the limelight of their world.

== Fictional team history ==
=== Pre-Crisis ===
In their original adventures prior to the Crisis on Infinite Earths, the Forgotten Heroes are all superheroes who, at one point in their career, had discovered a mysterious golden pyramid. When they attempt to report the discovery, they find themselves censored by the US Government. The members of the team are brought together by Immortal Man, who reveals to them that the pyramids are the work of his eons-old foe, Vandal Savage. With the aid of Superman, the Forgotten Heroes destroy the pyramids and save the Earth.

In Crisis on Infinite Earths #10, Animal Man, Dolphin and Rip Hunter again team up, along with Adam Strange, Captain Comet and Atomic Knight. This assemblage has been referred to as "the Forgotten Heroes" in retrospect, but was never called that in the Crisis series itself.

The original Forgotten Heroes were opposed by a team of evil counterparts known as the Forgotten Villains. Members of the Forgotten Villains include Atom-Master, Enchantress, Faceless Hunter, Kraklow, Mr. Poseidon, Ultivac, and Yggardis the Living Planet.

=== Post-Crisis ===
A new version of the Forgotten Heroes is formed in Resurrection Man #24 (March 1999), when some of the original members mistake Mitch Shelley for a reincarnated Immortal Man.

== Membership ==
=== Original team ===
- Animal Man (Bernhard "Buddy" Baker)
- Calvin "Cave" Carson
- Congo Bill/Congorilla (William Glenmorgan)
- Dolphin
- Dane Dorrance
- Rick Flag Jr.
- Rip Hunter
- Immortal Man (Klarn)

=== Later team ===
- Animal Man
- Ballistic (Kelvin Mao)
- Cave Carson
- Fetish (Thula)
- The Ray (Ray Terrill)
- Resurrection Man (Mitch Shelley)
- Vigilante (Pat Trayce)
