= Janice Race =

American former comic book editor

- Born: Janice Race
- Area: Editor
- Notable works: Jemm, Son of Saturn; World's Finest Comics

Janice Race is an American former comic book editor best known for her work at DC Comics in the 1980s.

== Biography ==
Raised in The Bronx, Race earned a B.S. in speech pathology and audiology from the College of City University. She was employed by DC Comics in the 1980s and had worked as a textbook editor for Harcourt Brace Jovanovich before entering the comics industry.

She began working at DC in late 1983 and served as an Associate Editor for Roy Thomas and Gerry Conway as well as an editor in her own right. Among the titles she oversaw was World's Finest Comics which featured DC's two best-known characters, Superman and Batman. Race was a frequent collaborator with writer Greg Potter and edited his Jemm, Son of Saturn limited series and his Me & Joe Priest graphic novel. She and Potter spent several months working on new concepts for the mid-1980s relaunch of Wonder Woman, before being joined by writer/artist George Pérez.

Race left DC before the first issue of the new series was published to return to book publishing and was replaced by Karen Berger. Bob Rozakis, the Executive Director of Production at DC Comics in the 1980s, has stated that Race left DC after being told of the low sales on the Jemm, Son of Saturn series.

== Bibliography ==
As editor unless noted:

=== DC Comics ===
- All-Star Squadron #32–58, Annual #3 (1984–1986) (as Associate Editor)
- America vs. the Justice Society #1–4 (1985) (as Associate Editor)
- Arak, Son of Thunder #33–41, Annual #1 (1984–1985) (as Associate Editor)
- Booster Gold #1–5 (1986)
- DC Graphic Novel #5 ("Me & Joe Priest") (1985)
- Deadman vol. 2 #1–3 (1986) (as co-editor for #2–3 with Richard Bruning)
- The Fury of Firestorm #22, 24–26, 28–49, 54, Annual #3 (1984–1986) (as Associate Editor until #36, as Editor from #37 afterwards)
- Jemm, Son of Saturn #1–12 (1984–1985) (as co-editor for #1–2 with Dick Giordano)
- Secret Origins vol. 2 #4 (Firestorm) (1986)
- Sun Devils #4–6 (1984 (as Associate Editor)
- World's Finest Comics #306–323 (1984–1986)

Preceded by Nick Cuti	All-Star Squadron associate editor 1984–1986	Succeeded by Barbara Randall
Preceded by Roger Slifer	World's Finest Comics editor 1984–1986	Succeeded by n/a
Preceded by Gerry Conway	The Fury of Firestorm editor 1985–1986	Succeeded by Paul Kupperberg
Preceded by n/a	Booster Gold editor 1986	Succeeded by Alan Gold
