= Jemm =

- Jemm as depicted in Martian Manhunter (vol. 2) #16 (March 2000). Art by Tom Mandrake.

Publication information
- Publisher: DC Comics
- First appearance: Jemm, Son of Saturn #1 (September 1984)
- Created by: Greg Potter (writer); Gene Colan (artist)

In-story information
- Species: Red Saturnian
- Place of origin: Saturn
- Team affiliations: Injustice Gang; Justice League
- Notable aliases: Son of Saturn
- Abilities: Superhuman Strength; Superhuman Speed; Superhuman Endurance; Superhuman Senses; Invulnerability; Telekinesis; Immortality; Flight; Telepathy; Empathy; Psychokinesis; Intangibility; Invisibility; Limited Shapeshifting

Jemm is a fictional alien character appearing in various comic book series published by DC Comics. He is an analogue of and occasional ally of Martian Manhunter.

== Publication history ==
Jemm was created by Greg Potter and Gene Colan, and first appeared in Jemm, Son of Saturn #1 (September 1984).

The first unofficial appearance of a Red Saturnian in DC Comics was Detective Comics #314 (April 1963) where he was a nameless alien criminal who was weakened by motor oil, enabling Martian Manhunter to defeat him.

According to Potter, Jemm was originally supposed to be Martian Manhunter's cousin. However, partway through developing the series, Potter was told by editor Janice Race that Martian Manhunter would reappear in Justice League of America. To avoid continuity problems, Potter rewrote the two to be unrelated.

Jemm is reintroduced to the DC Universe by Grant Morrison in JLA #12, which emphasized his similarity to Martian Manhunter. John Ostrander's run on Martian Manhunter reveals that the Saturnians were created by and modelled after the Martians.

== Fictional character biography ==
Jemm vs the Koolar in Jemm, Son of Saturn #2 (October 1984). Art by Gene Colan.

Jemm under Luthor's control in JLA #11 (October 1997). Art by Howard Porter.

Jemm is the prince of the Saturnians, a genetically modified species of Martian created by the other Martians to help them colonize the planet Saturn. The White Martians treated their clones as slaves, leading to a civil war between the two Martian races regarding their treatment. At the end of the war, the Saturnians gain freedom from the Martians and the White Martians are exiled to the Still Zone, a realm similar to the Phantom Zone.

Jemm is forced to flee the Saturnians' palace after a White Martian coup. His mother Jarlla hides him in a cave, where he is trained by the White Saturnian Rahani.

After Jarla and Rahani are killed by White Martians, Jemm steals a ship and escapes to Earth, searching for his lover Syraa. He arrives in Harlem and befriends African-American orphan Luther Mannkin. Jemm later locates Syraa, with whom he travels to New Bhok, a Red Saturnian colony. Jemm is exiled from the Saturnians due to his refusal to participate in a civil war occurring on New Bhok.

=== Injustice Gang ===
Jemm resurfaces years later as a member of the Injustice Gang, having been brainwashed by Lex Luthor and used a weapon against the Justice League. Martian Manhunter telepathically connects with Jemm, which frees him but leaves him comatose. He then learns that Jemm has been chosen to enter an arranged marriage with White Saturnian princess Cha'rissa to unite the Red and White Saturnians.

=== New Krypton ===
Jemm appears in Superman: World of New Krypton as the leader of the Saturnians. He commands all three known Saturnian races, including the white Koolars and the yellow "Faceless Hunters".

== Powers and abilities ==
Jemm possesses similar powers and weaknesses to Martian Manhunter, with the exception of shapeshifting. He can fire psychic energy blasts from the gemstone in his forehead, known as the Mark of Jargon.

== Other versions ==
An alternate universe version of Jemm from Earth-48 appears in Countdown to Final Crisis.

== In other media ==
=== Television ===
- Jemm appears in the Supergirl episode "Human for a Day", portrayed by Charles Halford. This version is the leader of the Faceless Hunters and a former prisoner of the Phantom Zone. When an earthquake hits National City, Jemm escapes the Department of Extranormal Operations (DEO)'s custody before he is killed by Martian Manhunter.
- Jemm appears in Young Justice, voiced by Phil LaMarr. This version is a Red Martian prince named J'emm J'axx whose fiancée S'yraa S'mitt accidentally killed his father King S'turnn while learning magic to seek his approval. J'emm later breaks up with S'yraa and becomes the leader of the Martians, promoting equality among them.

=== Video games ===
Jemm appears as a character summon in Scribblenauts Unmasked: A DC Comics Adventure.

=== Miscellaneous ===
Jemm received an action figure in wave 15 of Mattel's "DC Universe Classics" line in 2010.
