= Resurrection Man (character) =

- Artwork for the cover of Resurrection Man #25 (April 1999, DC Comics), art by Todd Klein and Jackson Guice.

Publication information
- Publisher: DC Comics
- First appearance: Resurrection Man #1 (May 1997)
- Created by: Andy Lanning; Dan Abnett; Jackson Guice

In-story information
- Alter ego: Mitchell "Mitch" Shelley
- Species: Metahuman
- Team affiliations: Forgotten Heroes; Justice Legion Alpha; Justice League
- Abilities: Originally: Reincarnation; After tektites: Resurrection, with different additional super-power each time he revives

Mitch Shelley, also known as Resurrection Man, is a character appearing in stories published by DC Comics. The character was created by Andy Lanning, Dan Abnett, and Jackson Guice, and first appeared in Resurrection Man #1 in 1997. The character does not identify himself as a superhero but often involves himself in cases where he protects people from criminals and super-villains. Due to sub-atomic technology in his bloodstream, Shelley cannot be permanently killed. No matter how he is killed or how much damage is done, he always resurrects fully healed. With each resurrection he has a new super-power (while whatever super-power he had previously disappears). In some cases, there is a physical transformation element to his resurrection (in one case, he resurrected as a living shadow, while another time his body altered into a woman's form).

The character has been connected to DC's immortal characters Vandal Savage and the Immortal Man. In the crossover DC One Million, a future timeline shows Mitch Shelley still alive in the 853rd century, operating with the superhero team Justice Legion A and now armed with a "Resurrector" device that controls his resurrection ability.

== Publication history ==
Resurrection Man was created by British comic book writers Dan Abnett and Andy Lanning (frequently known as DnA in their collaborations) and American artist Butch Guice. The initial idea came to them while working for Marvel Comics in the early 90s. Abnett and Lanning had considered reviving the Great Lakes Avengers, a superhero team led by a character called Mr. I or Mr. Immortal. Both felt it was boring that immortality was Mr. Immortal's sole power, and Lanning suggested it would be more interesting if the hero gained a different superpower with every resurrection. When the writing team moved to DC Comics, they proposed the concept to the editors and it was accepted. It was decided that the character Mitch Shelley would be a reluctant hero who did not emulate traditional superheroes, deciding not to wear a costume and often avoiding team-ups with DC's more famous characters such as Superman or the Justice League. To add mystery, the character was introduced as an amnesiac who was uncertain about the nature or origins of his resurrection ability.

Mitch Shelley made his debut in Resurrection Man #1 (1997). The monthly series was structured to follow a grand story arc planned by Abnett and Lanning, with stories following Shelley as he wandered America, having adventures while searching for the truth behind his past and his transformation. During this, he is pursued by "the Lab", its former director Hooker, and the bounty hunters known as the Body Doubles. The first volume of Resurrection Man was critically acclaimed and earned a dedicated fanbase but did not become a commercial success. The series ended in 1999 after 27 issues, with one issue being numbered Resurrection Man #1 Million (taking place in the 853rd century and tying into the DC One Million crossover). While the series answered many questions about Shelley's life and powers, some mysteries were left unresolved regarding the revelation that he had fought evil and villains such as Vandal Savage across history by reincarnating many times and somehow recalling the memories of his past lives. Following the series cancellation, Mitch Shelley made only occasional guest appearances and cameos in other DC Comics stories.

In 2011, DC ended its mainstream superhero titles and relaunched its superhero universe across 52 new series, leading to the New 52 rebooted timeline. Editor Eddie Berganza asked Abnett and Lanning to revive Resurrection Man as an ongoing title. The new monthly series debuted in September, with Fernando Dagnino Guerra as the artist. Rather than act as a sequel to the original stories, this series rebooted the character as an amnesiac searching for his origins, pursued by the Lab, the US government, and an angel who took issue with his constant resurrections. With 52 new superhero titles being published simultaneously, DC Comics acted quickly to cancel books that did not sell well enough to warrant their continuation. Due to mediocre sales, Resurrection Man volume 2 ended after 13 issues (the final issue being numbered #0, wrapping up the series while revealing the new origin story).

Resurrection Man: Quantum Karma (volume 3) was released in 2025 as a DC Black Label six-issue prestige format miniseries, written and drawn by Eisner Award winners Ramnarayan Venkatesan and Anand Radhakrishnan respectively. As one of his last projects before his death, character co-creator Jackson Guice also contributed to the limited series by drawing a one-page recap for each issue.

== Fictional biography ==
=== Original ===
Mitch Shelley grows up in (the fictional) Viceroy, South Carolina, raised by lawyer Preston Shelley. While Mitch finds his father to be harsh and judgmental, he is comforted with love and empathy from the housekeeper Conchita. As a child, Mitch seems to have dreams and visions of information and events he shouldn't know "as if he could access the memories of other people". Conchita believes this means Mitch is remembering past lives he's lived. Believing his child needs stricter discipline and should not have his dreams and "flights of fancy" encouraged, Preston sends Mitch to a boarding school at age eight. This begins a rift between the two that extends into Mitch's adulthood. Later becoming a lawyer himself, Mitch works with organized crime and helps bring legitimacy to the businesses of crime lords, partially as an act of defiance to his father. Later deciding he no longer wishes to be involved with criminals, Shelley gathers evidence to give to the FBI in exchange for entering the witness protection program. His wife Paula and his business partner Richard Bessly, secretly lovers, decide to take over Shelley's business and continue working for organized crime. As a show of good faith, they hire corrupt police detective Keach to kill Mitch Shelley. A gas main explosion destroys Shelley's office while he is inside.

Miraculously, Mitch survives, brain-damaged and amnesiac, wandering the streets as a homeless man. Months later, he is kidnapped by a clandestine organization simply called "the Lab". Along with many other homeless people, Shelley is forced to be a test subject of Hooker, director of the Lab. Suffering from an inoperable brain tumor, Hooker is determined to achieve immortality through a form of nano-technology called "tektites", sub-atomic robots that can heal and rebuild the body, defeating death. All of the test subjects are injected with tektites and then killed, but only Shelley ("sample 268") actually resurrects. Unable to determine what makes Shelley special, a desperate Director Hooker takes a sample of Mitch's blood and injects it into himself. Rather than duplicating Shelley's full resurrection, Hooker becomes invincible to death but is unable to heal from wounds, losing his sanity in the process. In a rage, he attacks the Lab personnel, causing enough chaos that Shelley escapes. Once again living on the streets, a confused and still amnesiac Shelley discovers he can fly. Meanwhile, Hooker escapes, in pursuit of Shelley, able to sense him due to the tektites in their respective bloodstreams. His subordinates "Mr. Fancy" and Cliff DeWitt take over the tektite experiments. They send the Body Doubles to retrieve Shelley, wishing to know why he gained a resurrection ability not seen in any other test subject, and also hoping to understand why he gained super-powers, as the Lab's tektite technology should not have been able to grant superhuman abilities.

Two years later after surviving the gas main explosion, Shelley is killed while trying to protect people from criminals. He resurrects and discovers his flight has been replaced with a new power. The shock of his resurrection brings back concrete memories, leading him to learn from a newspaper article that he is Mitchell "Mitch" Shelley, a lawyer believed to have died. Pursued by the bounty hunters known as the Body Doubles, Mitch begins investigating what happened to him two years ago that left him amnesiac and unable to die. As he travels, he involves himself in new adventures, helping those he can. During some of his subsequent deaths and resurrections, more memories return. Returning home to Viceroy, he reveals himself to his wife Paula and his business partner Richard Bessly, only to be shocked when they try to kill him. Shelley joins forces with investigator Kim Rebecki and is then confronted by Hooker. Their meeting triggers more memories and Shelley recalls his life in Viceroy, while also realizing that Paula and Richard betrayed him. He arranges for his killers to be caught, leading to Keach and Paula's arrest and indirectly causing Richard's death. Following this, crime lord Lucky Falcone targets Shelley.

While investigating his past, Shelley and Rebecki form a romantic interest in each other. The two find the Lab and learn about its tektite experiments from Mr. Fancy. Hooker then attacks, causing the Lab's nuclear reactor to become unstable. Rebecki, Fancy, and others escape, but Shelley and Hooker are caught in the nuclear explosion. Shelley survives for weeks as a living shadow before regaining his body, while Hooker is now a sentient skull. Following this incident, and while battling a parasitic creature called the Rider, Mitch once again has visions of past lives, recalling being a boy in Ancient Egypt, a knight in medieval times who encountered the demon Etrigan, and a soldier during World War I. With each of these memories, Shelley also recalls the experience of dying. Soon afterward, he is confronted by Lament, who claims to be an angel who has seen Mitch die many times but has never been able to collect his soul. Following this, Shelley teams up with the centuries-old mystic known as the Phantom Stranger. The Phantom Stranger calls Mitch one of his oldest friends and says they have fought together during many lifetimes because each time Shelley has died he has later reincarnated, the same soul and mind reborn. The Phantom Stranger is surprised to learn that Mitch now has the power to literally resurrect rather than reincarnate. He also mentions that Shelley used to have a single super-power in his different lives, indicating this is the reason he exhibits superhuman abilities while no other tektite test subject does. Before they part ways, the Phantom Stranger warns Mitch that his life has a great purpose and reminds him that in many lives he has been an enemy to the immortal villain Vandal Savage.

The villain Skism causes reality to warp around Mitch, outfitting him in a superhero costume and temporarily convincing him he is a masked hero. Mitch then formally meets Superman, who has met a future version of the Resurrection Man in the 853rd century (during the crossover DC One Million) and invites him to join the Justice League. Working with the team for a short time, Shelley decides a superhero life is overwhelming and not right for him, then leaves with Batman's blessing. Mitch later teams up with the Forgotten Heroes, a team originally formed by the heroic Immortal Man to fight his arch-enemy Vandal Savage. Before recorded history, Savage and his longtime enemy the Immortal Man gained their forms of immortality via exposure to a seemingly radioactive meteorite. This made Savage ageless and nearly invincible to injury, while the Immortal Man was able to die but each time would instantly reappear elsewhere on Earth in a new body and with his full memories intact. Cave Carson of the Forgotten Heroes explains to Shelley that the meteorite exposed the two men to tektites of unknown (possibly alien) origin, causing their immortal abilities. Savage then funded the Lab, hoping DeWitt (his son) and the other scientists could replicate the tektites in his own body. These replicated tektites were then injected into Shelley, giving him his resurrection power and slowly undoing the brain-damage he suffered from the gas main explosion, restoring his memories.

Cave Carson initially believes that Shelley is actually Immortal Man, who was believed to have finally died during the Crisis on Infinite Earths (an event in 1985-86 where DC Comics decided to both celebrate its 50th anniversary and reboot its fictional continuity where all DC stories would take place henceforth) and hasn't been seen since. Later, Savage confirms that the Resurrection Man and the Immortal Man are separate people, and reveals that the Immortal Man has been his prisoner for years. Shelley, Savage, the Immortal Man, and the Forgotten Heroes then join forces against a creature that emerges along with a second tektite meteorite. This creature, a "Warp Child", alters time and reality. To save the day, the Immortal Man melds his tektite field with the creature's own, overloading it. This destroys them both while restoring reality in the process. Following the battle, Mitch decides to leave adventures behind for a while so he can pursue a relationship with Kim Rebecki.

=== New 52 ===
Much of the DC Universe has its history changed as a result of the New 52 timeline. In this version of events, Mitch Shelley is born in the late 20th century but has no memories of any past lives and there is no indication he has ever lived past lives. An amnesiac Mitch Shelley wanders America, gaining different powers with each death, encountering the angel Suriel, who targets Mitchell because she insists that his soul is overdue to enter the afterlife. Shelley is also pursued by the Body Doubles, hired by Hooker, and private investigator Kim Rebecki, who has been hired by Amanda Waller, director of Task Force X (also known as the Suicide Squad). Initially believing Mitchell to be a villain, Rebecki's view changes after meeting him.

Eventually, Mitch Shelley is captured by Hooker, who explains that the two of them, as well as the Body Doubles, are all empowered by tektites that have reacted to them in different ways (Hooker became immortal but with no healing ability, while the Body Doubles became superhumanly strong). The director of the Lab then reveals himself to be the real, original Mitch Shelley, a cold-hearted and amoral scientist. Five years before, the original Shelley experimented on fallen and fatally injured soldiers in Iraq, attempting to perfect his "tektite solution". Shelley then lost his arm during an attack on their base and received a tektite injection. Rather than allow him to re-attach his arm, the tektites grew a new arm. The lost arm was burned but later grew into a copy of Mitch Shelley with no memories and a different morality, a Resurrection Man who has a different super-power each time he returns from death. After learning of the copy's existence and abilities, the original Shelley and Hooker decided to retrieve the Resurrection Man.

The Resurrection Man is horrified to learn he is a copy of a cruel villain. He concludes that the tektites brought him to life to make amends for the evil the original Shelley has caused. During their confrontation, forces of Heaven and Hell come to claim Mitch Shelley's soul. The angel Suriel takes the soul of the original Mitch Shelley, while a demon takes Resurrection Man and Kim Rebecki to safety back in Metropolis. The demon remarks that Resurrection Man's soul grows more powerful with each resurrection, and is curious to see what the result of this will be. After he leaves, Resurrection Man and Kim ponder their future.

== Powers and abilities ==
It was confirmed by Vandal Savage and the Phantom Stranger that Mitch Shelley has lived many lives across history, dying only to be reincarnated later. In each new life, he gained access to the memories of his past lives, making him essentially the same person living throughout history. What gave him this unique ability is unknown. The Phantom Stranger implied that in each life, Mitch had a single super-power, which might also be connected to why he gains a different power each time he resurrects. In his current life, Mitch Shelley was injected by sub-atomic "tektites" based on the same microscopic technology that grants Vandal Savage his own immortality. The tektites reacted to Mitch's unique nature, giving him not only the ability to resurrect fully healed from all forms of death (including cremation and seeming disintegration), but to have a different additional super-power each time he does so. When he next dies and resurrects, this power will be exchanged for another. The time it takes Mitch Shelley to resurrect varies with each occurrence. The process may take moments, minutes, or hours.

Beyond this unique immortality, Mitch seems to usually have only one super-power at a time, though sometimes the singular power can be used in a variety of ways. There seems to be no limit to the nature of the power Shelley might possess. His temporary abilities have ranged from minor shape-shifting (the ability to alter his skin color) or heightened perception (X-ray vision) to energy/matter manipulation. It was hypothesized by some characters that the power Mitch gets with his resurrection is often a defensive response influenced by the method of his previous death. After dying in a fire, Mitch resurrected with flame-based abilities and immunity to burns. After being atomized in a nuclear blast, Mitch resurrected as a sentient shadow who was only tangible when he concentrated, meaning he had a body that couldn't be injured (except by bright light). When he died from pain inducement, Shelley resurrected as a woman, with higher pain tolerance, then reverted to his former physical form during his next resurrection. Shelley himself has no control over what new power or trait his resurrection decides to give him.

Due to the tektites in his bloodstream, Shelley can detect and be detected by others who have tektites, with their technology noticeably reacting to each other the closer they get. His "tektite field" can also interact with another's, increasing their power or causing interference.

During the crossover DC One Million, Mitch Shelley was seen alive in the 853rd century without having aged. In this future timeline, Shelley wielded a device called a Resurrector that could instantly kill him while allowing him to choose what new power he would have after his next resurrection. The Resurrector also allowed him to keep the "default" powers of superhuman strength and flight.

The New 52 version of Resurrection Man owes his powers entirely to tektites and never lived past lives.

== Other versions ==
=== Elseworlds ===
During the run of Resurrection Man, Abnett and Lanning also wrote an Elseworlds graphic novel called The Superman Monster which retold the story of Frankenstein as a Superman story. This featured an actual "resurrection man" (i.e. a body-snatcher) who was drawn to closely resemble Mitch Shelley.

== Collected editions ==
- Resurrection Man Vol. 1 (#1-14)
- Resurrection Man Vol. 2: Dead Again (#1–7)
- Resurrection Man Vol. 2: A Matter of Death and Life (#0, #8-12)
