= Sea Devils (comics) =

Team of characters in DC Comics

- Cover to Sea Devils #21, art by Howard Purcell.

Publication information
- Publisher: DC Comics
- First appearance: Showcase #27 (August 1960)
- Created by: Robert Kanigher (writer); Russ Heath (artist)

In-story information
- Base(s): Windward Home
- Member(s): Biff Bailey; Dane Dorrance; Judy Walton; Nicky Walton; Miguel; Molo; Sikki

The Sea Devils are a team of characters in comics published by DC Comics. They are a team of conventional (non-superpowered) adventurers, in undersea adventures. They were created by writer Robert Kanigher and artist Russ Heath (through issue #10).

== Fictional team history ==
The team was introduced in Showcase #27 (July–August 1960) – #29 (November–December 1960). They then got their own title which lasted 35 issues (1961–67).

The team consisted of leader Dane Dorrance, Biff Bailey, Judy Walton (Dane's girlfriend), and Nicky Walton (Judy's younger brother). During a one issue crossover story with the Challengers of the Unknown in Challengers of the Unknown #51, they fight the criminal group Scorpio.

The team also has affiliated allies called the International Sea Devils: Molo from Africa, Sikki from India, and Miguel from South America. They also sometimes team up with a magically cursed, green skinned amphibian man they called the Man-Fish (Juan Vallambrosa) and a group of diving students called the "Tadpoles".

More than ten years after the cancellation of their title, the team takes a small part in the defeat of an alien invasion in Showcase #100 (May 1978). Dane and Judy (now married) help out Christopher Chance, the Human Target, in Detective Comics #486 (October–November 1979).

The Sea Devils (usually only Dane) later appear as part of the Forgotten Heroes team. Dane has also works away from the other Devils when he forms a new team to protect dolphin migration from human killers.

They help in another alien invasion, this time by the Appellaxians. They assist in entrapping a group of "Mercury" aliens, assisted by Aquaman and Cave Carson. This is set chronologically early in their career.

The Sea Devils resurface in Aquaman: Sword of Atlantis as the de facto paramilitary guardians of Windward Home. Jim Lockhart, the former Red Torpedo, and Elsa Magnusson, the widow of Mark Merlin, are the administrators of Windward. The Sea Devils briefly appear in Grant Morrison's Final Crisis, where they aid an alternate universe version of Aquaman in his battle against Ocean Master. The Sea Devils also appear in Justice League: Cry For Justice, where they assist Wally West and Jay Garrick in defusing an underwater explosive planted by Prometheus.

In The New 52 continuity reboot, the Sea Devils (composed of Dane Dorrance and Nick and Judy Walton) appear as "eco-terrorists" but remain close allies of Aquaman.

== Other versions ==
- Dane Dorrance appears in Convergence, where he becomes the director of S.T.A.R. Labs in Metropolis.
- An alternate universe iteration of the Sea Devils appears in the Tangent Comics imprint. These versions are mutant humanoid fish led by Ocean Master.
- An alternate universe iteration of the Sea Devils appears in Flashpoint. This version is a government-sponsored combat group.
- The Sea Devils make cameo appearances in DC: The New Frontier.
