= Cave Carson =

- Cover to Showcase #48, art by Lee Elias.

Publication information
- Publisher: DC Comics
- First appearance: Brave and the Bold #31 (August 1960)
- Created by: France Herron (writer); Bruno Premiani (artist)

In-story information
- Alter ego: Calvin Carson
- Team affiliations: Shadow Fighters; Forgotten Heroes
- Abilities: Highly intelligent; Cybernetic eye

Calvin "Cave" Carson is a fictional character who appeared in stories published by DC Comics. Carson, a spelunker, first appeared in Brave and the Bold #31 (September 1960); he was created by France Herron and Bruno Premiani.

== Publication history ==
Cave Carson and Rip Hunter were science fiction characters inspired by the success of the Challengers of the Unknown. Unlike similar groups, such as Hunter's Time Masters and the Sea Devils, Carson and his team never received a solo title.

The group appeared in The Brave and the Bold #31–33, 40, and 41. Next, they appeared in Showcase #48, 49, and 52. Carson's stories featured Carson and a team of fellow adventurers engaging in various adventures beneath the Earth's surface. He was joined by Bulldozer Smith, Johnny Blake, and Christie Madison.

In 2016, Cave Carson received a solo series, Cave Carson Has A Cybernetic Eye, as part of DC's Young Animal publishing line. It was written by Gerard Way and Jon Rivera, with art by Michael Avon Oeming. The series was relaunched in March 2018, without Way writing, as Cave Carson Has An Interstellar Eye.

== Fictional character biography ==
Cave Carson is an expert geologist and skilled cave diver and spelunker. He worked with his friends Bulldozer Smith, Johnny Blake, and Christie Madison. Carson and a team of fellow adventurers engage in various adventures beneath the Earth's surface. Carson had a lifelong fascination with tunnels and caves, but maybe not always of high moral values, as when he was young, he started his career as a lab tech for the company E. Borsten & Sons.

There, Carson started the Mighty Mole Project, which was working on developing a remarkable digging machine to help in mining access. However, the government's priority was on space shuttle and satellite projects, so the funding of the Mighty Mole Project was cut.

Carson would later join the Forgotten Heroes, who helped stop the Appellaxian invasion. They help Aquaman and the Sea Devils find an underwater grotto, during which they battle water-polluting aliens. Carson later works with the Time Masters on one of their adventures in time.

Carson later battles Eclipso when working with government liaison Amanda Waller. He leads Mona Bennet and Bruce Gordon in retaking the country Parador from Eclipso, who breaks his legs.

Carson and his team help the Justice Society of America retrieve Sand from the Earth's crust. In Final Crisis, Carson discovers ancient cave drawings under Manhattan.

In Challengers of the Unknown (2025), Carson is revealed to have been killed by a living asteroid.

== In other media ==
- Cave Carson appears as a character summon in Scribblenauts Unmasked: A DC Comics Adventure.
- Cave Carson appears in Batman: The Brave and the Bold.
