= Justice League in other media =

Fictional superhero team

Adaptations of the Justice League in other media
- Logo for the DC Extended Universe (DCEU) film Justice League (2017)
- Original source: Comics published by DC Comics
- First appearance: The Brave and the Bold #28 (March 1960)

Films and television
- Film(s): Justice League of America (1997); Justice League (2017); Zack Snyder's Justice League (2021); The Flash (2023)
- Television show(s): Super Friends (1973); Batman Beyond (2000); Justice League (2001); Static Shock (2001); Justice League Unlimited (2004); Young Justice (2011); Justice League Action (2016); DC's Legends of Tomorrow (2020)

Games
- Video game(s): Justice League Task Force (1995); Justice League Heroes (2006); Mortal Kombat vs. DC Universe (2008); DC Universe Online (2011); Lego Batman 2: DC Super Heroes (2012); Injustice: Gods Among Us (2013); Injustice 2 (2017)

The Justice League, also called the Justice League of America or JLA, is a fictional superhero team that appears in comic books published by DC Comics. Since their first appearance in The Brave and the Bold #28 (February/March 1960), various incarnations of the team have appeared in film, television, and video game adaptations.

== Television ==
=== Animation ===
- The Justice League appears in The Superman/Aquaman Hour of Adventure, consisting of Superman, Green Lantern, Hawkman (Katar Hol), Flash, and Atom (Ray Palmer).
- The longest-running version of the Justice League was the loosely adapted series called Super Friends, which ran in various incarnations from 1973 to 1986.
- The Justice League appears in series set in the DC Animated Universe, consisting of Batman, Superman, Wonder Woman, Martian Manhunter, Flash, Hawkgirl, and Green Lantern as founding members. In Justice League Unlimited, various heroes join the League, including Aquaman, Atom Smasher, Aztek, Black Canary, Blue Devil, Booster Gold, B'wana Beast, Captain Atom, Commander Steel, Creeper, Crimson Avenger, Crimson Fox, Doctor Fate, Doctor Light, Doctor Mid-Nite, Elongated Man, Etrigan, Fire, Green Arrow, Gypsy, Hawk and Dove, Hourman, Ice, Johnny Thunder and Thunderbolt, Metamorpho, Mr. Terrific, Nemesis, Obsidian, Orion, Plastic Man, Question, Ray, Red Tornado, Rocket Red, Sand, Shining Knight, Stargirl, Starman, Steel, S.T.R.I.P.E., Vibe, Vigilante, Vixen, Waverider, Wildcat, and Zatanna. Additionally, Captain Marvel, Huntress, and Supergirl were formerly members before leaving for various reasons.
  - A futuristic version of the League appears in Batman Beyond, consisting of Superman, Big Barda, Green Lantern Kai-Ro, Aquagirl, Micron, Rex Stewart / Warhawk, Static, and Gear.
  - An early attempt at a Justice League television series was to feature lesser known superheroes, like the Question and Doctor Fate, that would have been part of the DC Animated Universe. The series was cancelled in favor of Batman Beyond.
- The Justice League appears in The Batman, consisting of Batman, Superman, Martian Manhunter, Green Lantern, Green Arrow, Hawkman, and the Flash. Introduced in the fourth season finale, "The Joining", the League's members make recurring appearances throughout the fifth season as allies to Batman. Additionally, the show's version of their headquarters combines elements of the Hall of Justice from Super Friends and the Watchtower from the comics.
- The Justice League appears in Batman: The Brave and the Bold, consisting of Batman, Superman, Wonder Woman, Green Lantern (Hal Jordan), Flash (Barry Allen), Aquaman, Martian Manhunter, Black Canary, Green Arrow, Red Tornado, and Fire. The Justice League International is introduced in "Darkseid Descending!", and consists of Batman, Aquaman, Martian Manhunter, Fire, Ice, Green Lantern (Guy Gardner), Booster Gold, and Blue Beetle (Jaime Reyes).
- The Justice League appears in Young Justice, consisting of Atom, Aquaman, Batman, Batwoman, Black Canary, Black Lightning, Blue Devil, Captain Atom, Captain Marvel/Shazam, Doctor Fate, Elongated Man, Fire, Flash (Barry Allen), Green Arrow, Green Lantern (Guy Gardner, Hal Jordan, and John Stewart), Hardware, Hawkman, Hawkwoman, Ice, Icon, Katana, Magog, Martian Manhunter, Metamorpho, Plastic Man, Red Tornado, Rocket, Steel, Superman, Wonder Woman, and Zatanna.
- The Justice League appears in the Mad segment "That's What Super Friends Are For".
- Funny animal variants of the Justice League appear in the DC Nation Shorts segment Farm League, consisting of Superman, Batman, Wonder Woman, Flash, Green Lantern, Aquaman, Captain Marvel, Robin, and Cyborg.
- A Justice League animated series titled Justice League Action debuted on Cartoon Network in fall 2016. The series features a revolving cast anchored by Batman, Wonder Woman, and Superman.
- The Justice League appears in Harley Quinn, consisting of Superman, Batman, Wonder Woman, Zatanna, Aquaman, Green Lantern (John Stewart), and Flash (Barry Allen).
- The Justice League are mentioned recurringly in Batwheels, however, they never physically appear. Known members include Batman, Green Arrow, The Atom, Green Lantern (John Stewart), Zatanna and the Flash.

=== Live action ===
- The Justice League appears in Legends of the Superheroes, consisting of Batman, Robin, Black Canary, Captain Marvel, Flash, Green Lantern, Hawkman, and Huntress.
- In 1990, Magnum Pictures developed a script for a Justice League TV show starring Booster Gold, Blue Beetle, Fire and Ice plus other members from the comic's Justice League International run.
- The Justice League appears in Justice League of America, consisting of Green Lantern (Guy Gardner), Fire, Ice, Flash (Barry Allen), and Atom (Ray Palmer).
- The Justice League appears in Smallville, consisting of Aquaman, Cyborg, Green Arrow, Black Canary, Martian Manhunter, and Impulse as primary members and Emil Hamilton and Chloe Sullivan as support staff.
- The Justice League appears in the Arrowverse crossover "Crisis on Infinite Earths", consisting of White Canary, Flash, Supergirl, Batwoman, Superman, Black Lightning and Martian Manhunter, with an empty seat in honor of Green Arrow.

== Film ==
=== Live-action ===
==== Justice League: Mortal (canceled) ====
In February 2007, it was announced that Warner Bros hired husband and wife duo Michele and Kieran Mulroney to write a script for a Justice League film. The news came around the same time that Joss Whedon's long-developed Wonder Woman film had been canceled, as well as The Flash, written and directed by David S. Goyer. Titled Justice League: Mortal, Michele and Kiernan Mulroney submitted their script to Warner Bros. in June 2007, receiving positive feedback, which prompted the studio to immediately fast track production in the hopes of filming to begin before the 2007–2008 Writers Guild of America strike. Warner Bros. was less willing to proceed on development with a sequel to Superman Returns, having been disappointed with the box office return. Brandon Routh was not approached to reprise the role of Superman in Justice League Mortal, nor was Christian Bale from Batman Begins. Warner Bros. intended for Justice League: Mortal to be the start of a new film franchise, and to branch out into separate sequels and spin-offs. Shortly after filming finished with The Dark Knight, Bale stated in an interview that "It'd be better if it doesn't tread on the toes of what our Batman series is doing," though he personally felt it would make more sense for Warner Bros. to release the film after his planned "Batman 3" (later called The Dark Knight Rises). Jason Reitman was the original choice to direct Justice League, but he turned it down, as he considers himself an independent filmmaker and prefers to stay out of big budget superhero films. George Miller signed on to direct in September 2007, with Barrie Osbourne producing on a projected $220 million budget.

The following month roughly 40 actors and actresses were auditioning for the ensemble superhero roles, among them Joseph Cross, Michael Angarano, Max Thieriot, Minka Kelly, Adrianne Palicki, and Scott Porter. Miller intended to cast younger actors as he wanted them to "grow" into their roles over the course of several films. D. J. Cotrona was cast as Superman, along with Armie Hammer as Batman. Jessica Biel reportedly declined the Wonder Woman role after being in negotiations. The character was also linked to actresses Teresa Palmer and Shannyn Sossamon, along with Mary Elizabeth Winstead, who confirmed that she had auditioned. Ultimately, Megan Gale was cast as Wonder Woman, while Palmer was cast as Talia al Ghul, whom Miller had in mind to act with a Russian accent. The script for Justice League: Mortal would have featured John Stewart as the Green Lantern, a role originally offered to Columbus Short. Hip hop musician Common was cast, with Adam Brody as The Flash / Barry Allen, and Jay Baruchel as the lead villain, Maxwell Lord. Longtime Miller collaborator Hugh Keays-Byrne had been cast as Martian Manhunter. Aquaman had yet to be cast. Marit Allen was hired as the original costume designer before her death in November 2007, and the responsibilities were assumed by Weta Workshop.

However, the Writers Strike began that same month and placed the film on hold. Warner Bros. had to let the options lapse for the cast, but development was fast tracked once more in February 2008 when the strike ended. Warner Bros. and Miller wanted to start filming immediately, but production was pushed back three months. Originally, the majority of Justice League: Mortal would be shot at Fox Studios Australia in Sydney, with other locations scouted nearby at local colleges, and Sydney Heads doubling for Happy Harbor. The Australian Film Commission also had a say with casting choices, giving way for George Miller to cast Gale, Palmer and Keays-Bryne, all Australian natives. The production crew was composed entirely of Australians, but the Australian government denied Warner Bros. a 40 percent tax rebate as they felt they had not hired enough Australian actors. Miller was frustrated, stating that "A once-in-a-lifetime opportunity for the Australian film industry is being frittered away because of very lazy thinking. They're throwing away hundreds of millions of dollars of investment that the rest of the world is competing for and, much more significantly, highly skilled creative jobs." Production offices were then moved to Vancouver Film Studios in Canada. Filming was pushed back to July 2008, while Warner Bros was still confident they could release the film in summer 2009.

With production delays continuing, and the success of The Dark Knight in 2008, Warner Bros. decided to focus on development of individual films featuring the main heroes, allowing director Christopher Nolan to separately complete his Batman trilogy with The Dark Knight Rises in 2012. Gregory Noveck, senior vice president of creative affairs for DC Entertainment stated "we're going to make a Justice League movie, whether it's now or 10 years from now. But we're not going to do it and Warners is not going to do it until we know it's right." Actor Adam Brody joked "They [Warner Brothers] just didn't want to cross their streams with a whole bunch of Batmans in the universe." Warner Bros. relaunched development for the solo Green Lantern film, released in 2011 as a critical and financial disappointment. Meanwhile, film adaptations for The Flash and Wonder Woman continued to languish in development while filming for a Superman reboot was commencing in 2011 with Man of Steel, produced by Nolan and written by David S. Goyer, which would go on to launch the DC Extended Universe.

==== DC Extended Universe (DCEU) ====
The Justice League are a common narrative plot thread in the DC Extended Universe starting with Batman v Superman: Dawn of Justice with Superman, Batman and Wonder Woman teaming up against Doomsday and in Suicide Squad where Bruce gets the files on Barry Allen and Arthur Curry from Amanda Waller.

The theatrical version of a live action Justice League movie was released in November 2017 and received mixed reviews from critics and earned over $657 million worldwide. The film was directed by Joss Whedon and Zack Snyder although Snyder is the only person to receive a directing credit for the film. Whedon was brought on as a consultant, then given control over the project after Snyder stepped down following his daughter's death, and the film was rewritten by Whedon, with the original script being completed by Chris Terrio. The film stars Ben Affleck as Bruce Wayne / Batman, Henry Cavill as Clark Kent / Superman, Gal Gadot as Diana Prince / Wonder Woman, Ezra Miller as Barry Allen / The Flash, Jason Momoa as Arthur Curry / Aquaman and Ray Fisher as Victor Stone / Cyborg. The film also stars Amy Adams as Lois Lane, Jeremy Irons as Alfred Pennyworth, Diane Lane as Martha Kent, Connie Nielsen as Hippolyta, Joe Morton as Silas Stone, Ciarán Hinds as Steppenwolf, Amber Heard as Mera and J. K. Simmons as James Gordon.

Snyder and Warner Bros released a 4 hour director's cut of Justice League via HBO Max on March 18, 2021. This version presents Snyder's original vision for a Justice League film with a more grounded and darker tone as well as an overall aesethetic more in line with Snyder's previous DCEU films Man of Steel and Batman v Superman: Dawn of Justice rather than the lighter, more family friendly tone of the 2017 theatrical cut and features a radically overhauled ending. Additional footage seen in this cut is mainly footage that was shot for the theatrical cut but was discarded when Snyder left the project although a handful of new scenes were filmed once the director's cut release was greenlit. Characters who did not appear in the theatrical cut in 2017 such as Martian Manhunter (played by Harry Lennix), Iris West (played by Kiersey Clemons), Ryan Choi (Zheng Kai), Darkseid (Ray Porter) and DeSaad (Peter Guinness) are also included in this version of the film. The Snyder Cut also features a new score by Tom Holkenborg. Holkenborg was intended to score the original version of Justice League, but was replaced by Danny Elfman during reshoots.

- The team made a cameo appearance in the Peacemaker season 1 finale episode "It's Cow or Never" with only Momoa and Miller reprising their roles as Aquaman and Flash while Superman and Wonder Woman were played by stand-ins.
- In a mid-credit scene of Shazam! Fury of the Gods, A.R.G.U.S. agents Emilia Harcourt and John Economos invite Billy Batson / Shazam to the Justice Society, where Shazam expresses his disappointment that it wasn't the Justice League.
- An alternate version of the Justice League was featured in The Flash (2023) and consisted of two versions of Barry (one from the main timeline and one from the past, both played by Miller), an alternate version of Bruce Wayne / Batman (played by Michael Keaton) and Kara Zor-El / Supergirl (played by Sasha Calle). Additionally, Affleck, Gadot, and Momoa cameod as their versions of Batman, Wonder Woman, and Aquaman. A CGI version of Cavill as Superman also appeared in the film. Cyborg was also briefly pictured, albeit not portrayed by Ray Fischer.

=== Animation ===
- The Justice League appears in Justice League: The New Frontier, consisting of Batman, Green Lantern, Martian Manhunter, Flash (Barry Allen), Wonder Woman, Superman, Aquaman, and Atom.
- The Justice League appears in Justice League: Crisis on Two Earths, consisting of Batman, Superman, Wonder Woman, Green Lantern, the Flash (Wally West), Martian Manhunter, Firestorm, Black Canary, Red Tornado, and Black Lightning.
- The Justice League appears in Justice League: Doom, consisting of Superman, Batman, Cyborg, the Flash (Barry Allen), Green Lantern (Hal Jordan), Wonder Woman, and Martian Manhunter.
- The Justice League appears in Lego Batman: The Movie – DC Super Heroes Unite.
- The Justice League appears in the DC Animated Movie Universe, consisting of Superman, Batman, Wonder Woman, Cyborg, Flash (Barry Allen), Green Lantern (Hal Jordan), Aquaman, Shazam, Green Lantern (John Stewart), Flash (Barry Allen), Hawkman, and Martian Manhunter.
- The Justice League appears in JLA Adventures: Trapped in Time, consisting of Superman, Batman, Cyborg, Flash (Barry Allen), Wonder Woman, and Aquaman.
- The Justice League appears in DC Super Heroes vs. Eagle Talon, consisting of Batman, Superman, Wonder Woman, Flash (Barry Allen), Aquaman, and Cyborg.
- An alternate universe variant of the Justice League appears in Justice League: Gods and Monsters, consisting of Batman (Kirk Langstrom), Wonder Woman (Bekka), and Superman (Hernan Guerra).
  - An animated series, Justice League: Gods and Monsters Chronicles, serves as a companion to the film. While the first season was released in 2015, a second season was planned to be released in the following year and would have featured ten episodes, but as of 2020, it has been shelved. Additionally, a series of one-shot comics written by J. M. DeMatteis and Bruce Timm was released and focused on each hero's origin story, including a three-issue prequel comic book series.
- The Justice League appears in the Tomorrowverse, consisting of Batman, Superman, Wonder Woman, Flash (Barry Allen), Martian Manhunter, Vixen, Green Arrow, and Green Lantern (John Stewart).

=== Canceled Justice League animated films ===
- An untitled Justice League direct to DVD film was in the works in 2008, with a design by James Tucker.
- In 2009, Bruce Timm has expressed interest in an animated film based on the JLA/Avengers crossover limited series. As of 2026, no updates have appeared since.
- In 2013, producer James Tucker has spoken about wanting a Wonder Woman-centered Justice League film.

==== Other appearances ====
- The Justice League appears in The Lego Movie franchise, consisting of Superman, Batman, Wonder Woman, Green Lantern (Hal Jordan), Flash (Barry Allen), and Aquaman.
- The Justice League appears in Teen Titans Go! To the Movies, consisting of Superman, Batman, Wonder Woman, Green Lantern (John Stewart), Aquaman, Atom (Ray Palmer), Flash (Barry Allen), Green Lantern (Hal Jordan), and Shazam.
- The Justice League makes a cameo appearance in Space Jam: A New Legacy, consisting of Superman, Flash, Green Lantern (John Stewart), Aquaman, and Batgirl.
- The Justice League appears in DC League of Super-Pets, consisting of Superman, Batman, Wonder Woman, Green Lantern (Jessica Cruz), Flash (Barry Allen), Aquaman, and Cyborg.

== Games ==
=== VIdeo games ===
- The Justice League appears in the video games Justice League Task Force, released in 1995 for the Sega Genesis and Super Nintendo Entertainment System, and Justice League Heroes, released in 2006 as a cross-platform game, as well as several video games based on its animated incarnation.
- Superman, Batman, Wonder Woman, Flash (Barry Allen), Captain Marvel, and Green Lantern (Hal Jordan) appear in Mortal Kombat vs. DC Universe.
- The Justice League is featured prominently in DC Universe Online, with the Watchtower serving as the transportation hub between Metropolis and Gotham City.
- The Justice League appears in the mobile game Justice League: Earth's Final Defense, consisting of Superman, Batman, Wonder Woman, Green Lantern, the Flash, Aquaman, and Cyborg.
- The Justice League appears in the Injustice franchise, consisting of Batman, Supergirl, Green Arrow, Black Canary, Firestorm, Blue Beetle, Green Lantern (Hal Jordan), Flash (Barry Allen), Harley Quinn, and Catwoman.
- The Justice League appears in Justice League: Cosmic Chaos.
- The Justice League appears in Suicide Squad: Kill the Justice League, consisting of Superman, Batman, Wonder Woman, Flash (Barry Allen), and Green Lantern (John Stewart).

==== Lego video games ====
- The Justice League appears in Lego Batman 2: DC Super Heroes, consisting of Superman, Flash, Wonder Woman, Green Lantern (Hal Jordan), Cyborg, and Martian Manhunter.
- The Justice League appears in Lego Batman 3: Beyond Gotham, consisting of Batman, Robin, Superman, Wonder Woman, Flash, Green Lantern (Hal Jordan), Cyborg, Martian Manhunter, Aquaman, and Plastic Man.
- The Justice League is featured in Lego DC Super-Villains. As part of the story, they are replaced by a different team of superheroes called the "Justice Syndicate".

=== Tabletop games ===
- The Justice League is also the theme of the Justice League Unlimited Roleplaying Game.
