= Booster Gold (comic book) =

Monthly DC Comics comic book

- Cover to Booster Gold vol. 2 #1. Art by Dan Jurgens.

Publication information
- Publisher: DC Comics
- Schedule: Monthly
- Format: Ongoing series
- Genre: Superhero
- Publication date: (vol. 1); February 1986 – February 1988 (vol. 2); October 2007 – August 2011
- No. of issues: (vol. 1); 25 (vol. 2); 47
- Main character(s): Booster Gold; Rip Hunter; Skeets

Creative team
- Created by: Dan Jurgens
- Written by: Keith Giffen; J.M. DeMatteis; Dan Jurgens; Geoff Johns; Jeff Katz
- Artist(s): Chris Batista; Dan Jurgens; Norm Rapmund

Booster Gold was an ongoing monthly DC Comics comic book series featuring the eponymous superhero Booster Gold, created by Dan Jurgens.

== Volume 2 ==
The second Booster Gold series began publication in October 2007. After twelve issues, co-writers Geoff Johns and Jeff Katz left the series, leaving Jurgens as the main writer and artist, along with Norm Rapmund as co-artist. With #32, Keith Giffen and J.M. DeMatteis, who wrote the 1980s Justice League International series (of which Booster was a part) took over the series, and was joined by Chris Batista as interior artist and former JLI artist Kevin Maguire as cover artist for #32-36. Giffen, DeMatteis, and Batista left the series with #43 and were replaced by a returning Dan Jurgens and Norm Rapmund, who provided the final story arc of the series, a Flashpoint crossover story. The series ended in August 2011 with issue #47.

=== Characters ===
==== Main ====
- Booster Gold (Michael Jon Carter): A former college football star from the 25th century turned time-travelling adventurer.
- Rip Hunter: Booster's boss, a mysterious time master who refuses to reveal his identity, who is later revealed to be Booster Gold's future son. His father is still unaware of his parentage. It is later revealed that Booster's future self checks up on his son's progress in shaping his younger counterpart into the hero he is destined to be.
- Skeets: An artificially intelligent robot who accompanies Booster in his time-traveling adventures.

==== Recurring ====
- Goldstar (Michelle Carter): Booster's twin sister from the future. She worked as Booster's partner, but then fled into time after finding out that she would be dead if Rip had not saved her while time travelling. Booster later found her in Coast City and brought her back to the present.
- Blue Beetle (Jaime Reyes): A teen who is the latest to don the Blue Beetle mantle. He struggles in his double life as a teenager and a superhero.
- Supernova (Daniel Carter): Present-day unemployed ancestor of Booster, Goldstar, Rip Hunter, and Jon Carter who reluctantly dons the mantle of the superhero Supernova.

=== Plot ===
52 Pick-Up is the first story arc (issues #1–6) of the series. Booster traveled through the ravaged time stream with Skeets and Rip Hunter to repair the damage done during 52 and to stop a group of supervillains who were exploiting temporal anomalies to eliminate the world's greatest heroes. Booster failed to save Barbara Gordon from being paralyzed and wished to try again, but Rip told him that the event was fated. Angry at Rip and wanting to save Ted Kord from being killed by Maxwell Lord, Booster is visited by Dan Garret, Jaime Reyes, and a future Blue Beetle.

Blue and Gold covered issues #0, 7–10, and 1,000,000. Booster tried to save Ted Kord from being murdered, but the resulting change to the time stream created a wormhole of problems. Realizing the time stream would never be right as long as he is alive, Ted sacrifices his life. Rip perked Booster up by showing him that he had rescued his sister, Michelle, unbeknownst to her.

Vicious Cycle ran in issues #11–12. When Batman and Batgirl foiled a heist conducted by Killer Moth at the behest of 27th century time-traveler Wiley Dalbert, they were removed from the timeline. Booster and Michelle, now working under the name Goldstar, then helped the villains get away with their crime.

Stars in Your Eyes spanned issues #13–14. When Daniel brought back a Starro spore from an attack in Paris, the alien invader used Rip to take over the world. Booster had to make a deal with Lady Chronos. Together, they stopped the invasion.

Reality Lost spread over issues #15–19. A mysterious time-traveler stole a knife and attempted to unlock a vault at Vanishing Point. Booster eventually catches him and sets reality straight. Meanwhile, Michelle discovers that she was supposed to die and is alive because of Rip. Feeling angry and betrayed, she runs away in time to live her own way.

Issue #20 revolved around the Time Sphere stalling. Booster then dives into 1952 and gets involved with Task Force X. When Booster notices Rip fix the Time Sphere, he and Rip safely retreat to the present.

Day of Death occupied issues #21–25. Booster has to fix a timeline in which Black Beetle had killed Robin and the rest of the Teen Titans. Afterwards, Rip reminds him that he needs to remove Joker's photos of him trying to save Barbara Gordon from the Batcave.

Dead Ted, a Blackest Night tie-in, ran in issues #26–27. Ted Kord is reanimated as a Black Lantern and tries to kill Booster. Booster teams up with Jaime Reyes to survive. After failing to defeat him with their hands or energy blasts, they discover that Black Lanterns are vulnerable to light. They grab a light gun from Ted's industries and defeat Kord. Later, they go to Vanishing Point and give him a proper burial.

The Tomorrow Memory covered issues #28–31. Rip sends an unwilling Booster to stop the murder of Hank Henshaw, who would soon become Cyborg Superman. Time-traveling assassin Sondra Crain arrives in Coast City to murder Henshaw. When Booster meets her, she persuades him to help stop Cyborg Superman from mass murder.

During Cyborg Superman's attack, Booster and Skeets are able to save only Sondra Crain, Grace Greene and Michelle. Elsewhere, on Vanishing Point, Booster's future self meets with Rip. He reveals that Rip did not train the younger Booster alone and that he will become the hero that he is destined to be. In the present Rip counsels an angry and sad Booster, who patches things up with Michelle and saves a girl's dog he had unintentionally killed earlier. Rip then goes to Vanishing Point and is notified that something is wrong with the timeline. (see Batman: The Return of Bruce Wayne)

The 10th story arc (beginning in issue #32) ties in with the events of Justice League: Generation Lost and Brightest Day #0. After retrieving Doctor Fate's helmet, Booster discovers that Maxwell Lord is alive and after Lord erases the memory of his existence, only Booster, Skeets, Captain Atom, Fire, and Ice remember him. Booster then goes back to see if Lord is remembered and to find evidence to prove Lord's existence without success.

Turbulence, a Flashpoint tie-in story, finished the series over issues #44–47. After the Time Masters: Vanishing Point event, Rip informs them that someone sneaked into their base and left a message on the chalkboard. When an alternate timeline starts due to the machinations of the Flash, Booster and Skeets awaken and are the only ones who remember the original timeline. Booster travels to Coast City, but US soldiers mistakenly attack him as an Atlantean threat. Skeets is damaged by the military's Project Six, which is revealed to be Doomsday. During the battle Booster Gold discovers that Doomsday is controlled by General Nathaniel Adam. Booster escapes from Doomsday and saves a woman named Alexandra Gianopoulos. Booster learns the timeline has been changed, suspecting that Professor Zoom was behind it. Alexandra and Booster Gold split up, but she uses her secret powers to take others' powers and follows him. Later, he flies to Gotham City and Doomsday attacks him. Alexandra destroys Adam's control link in an attempt to rescue Booster. An uncontrolled Doomsday attacks Booster. Doomsday beats Booster nearly to death, but he is rescued by Alexandra. Booster manages to put Doomsday's helmet back on, restoring control to General Adam, who grabs Booster, hoping to kill him. Adam takes Booster back to the base for interrogation, allowing him to escape when the sight of "Project Superman" causes Doomsday's true personality to resurface. Alexandra manages to defeat Doomsday by using the control helmet to make Doomsday tear himself apart, subsequently asking Booster to take her with him. However, Alexandra subsequently sacrifices herself to save him from an Atlantean attack. Booster returns to Vanishing Point as history resets itself, without any clear memory of his time in the "Flashpoint" universe. Alexandra leaves the message on the chalkboard and vanishes.

=== Co-feature ===
Blue Beetle began a co-feature in issues #21–29.

The first story arc, Armor Plated, was about Blue Beetle battling several robots that were attacking El Paso. When he, Brenda Del Vecchio, and Paco investigate who was behind the attacks, it turned out to be a convict's daughter, who later turns out to be a fembot.

The second arc, Black and Blue, features Black Beetle who tries to kill Jaime. As they fight, Jaime gets angry and his scarab goes through a transition, turning the costume into a more deadly look and the scarab starts to repeat "Kill". After this happens, Black Beetle reveals that he is a future Jaime. Jaime refuses to believe this and escapes.

In Dead Ted, a Booster story arc that Jaime guest-stars in, Jaime joins Booster in trying to stop Ted Kord. After initially failing to defeat him, Jaime and Booster grab Ted's light gun and finally succeed.

In The Beginning of the End Jaime and his friends go to Bialya. When they set off a trap, resulting in bugs attacking them, Jaime went into costume, but when he touches a scarab it takes control of him.

The following story arc, The End of the End, finished the story arc and the co-feature. Peacemaker appears and battles Jaime. The scarab told him to kill Peacemaker, but Jaime temporarily overpowered it and asks Peacemaker to destroy the pyramid and free him. Peacemaker does so, saving the day.

=== Collected editions ===
Vol. #	Title	Material collected	Pages	Publication date	ISBN
1	52 Pick-Up	Booster Gold vol. 2 #1–6	160	May 2009	1-40121-787-7
2	Blue and Gold	Booster Gold vol. 2 #0, 7–10, 1,000,000	160	December 2009	1-40121-956-X
3	Reality Lost	Booster Gold vol. 2 #11–12, 15–19	168	August 2009	1-40122-249-8
4	Day of Death	Booster Gold vol. 2 #20–25; The Brave and the Bold #23	160	April 2010	978-1-40122-643-5
5	The Tomorrow Memory	Booster Gold vol. 2 #26–31	160	December 2010	1-40122-918-2
6	Past Imperfect	Booster Gold vol. 2 #32–38	168	April 2011	1-40123-024-5
7	Flashpoint: The World of Flashpoint Featuring Superman	Booster Gold vol. 2 #44–47 (book contains other Flashpoint-related series as well)	256	March 2012	1-40123-434-8
Vol. #	Title	Material collected	Pages	Publication date	ISBN
1	The Complete 2007 Series: Book One	Booster Gold vol. 2 #0–14, 1,000,000	400	April 2024	978-1779527233
2	The Complete 2007 Series: Book Two	Booster Gold vol. 2 #15–31; The Brave and the Bold #23	440	April 2025	978-1799501039
