= Glacier (DC Comics) =

- Sigrid Nansen as Glacier. Concept art by Meghan Hetrick.

Publication information
- Publisher: DC Comics
- First appearance: Super Friends #9 (December 1977)
- Created by: E. Nelson Bridwell (writer); Ramona Fradon (artist)

In-story information
- Alter ego: Sigrid Nansen
- Species: Metahuman
- Team affiliations: Justice League America; Global Guardians; Justice League
- Partnerships: Fire; Ice; Ice Minister
- Notable aliases: Icemaiden
- Abilities: Cyrokinesis

Sigrid Nansen is a superhero in American comic books published by DC Comics, first appearing in Super Friends #9 (December 1977). Originally known as Icemaiden, they replaced the hero known as Ice for a time. They are one of multiple ice-themed characters in the DC Universe. The character was re-introduced during "Infinite Frontier" in which they adopt the new identity of Glacier and identify as non-binary.

== Fictional character biography ==
=== Pre-Flashpoint ===
==== Global Guardians ====
Sigrid Nansen received her powers as the result of an experiment funded by the Norwegian government. In an attempt to please both her overbearing scientist mother (who constantly belittled her for not having a boyfriend and not being a top scientist) and the Norwegian government, Sigrid reluctantly agreed to the experiments. The goal was to duplicate the abilities of what at the time were a legendary tribe of ice-people; the experiment was a success, though as a side-effect, Sigrid's skin permanently turned blue. Taking the name Icemaiden, she joined the Global Guardians as her country's representative to that international super-team.

==== Legends ====
During the DC miniseries Legends, the people of the United States were turned against all heroes, superheroes, and metahumans; the President decreed that no costumed hero could operate legally. This did not affect the Global Guardians, however, who worked outside of the U.S. During this time, what Sylvester Pemberton referred to as the "Great Super-Hero Scare" Doctor Mist sent Icemaiden, along with Rising Sun, Tasmanian Devil, and Green Flame to Canada to run security for the international Trade Conference. Icemaiden fell victim to Injustice Unlimited and was hypnotized into serving the villains. This resulted in her traveling to Greenland with Jade and the new Icicle on a mission to find and free Solomon Grundy. In the end, the villains were defeated and Icemaiden regained her free will.

==== Resignation ====
Upon the discovery of a real tribe of ice-people, their princess Tora Olafsdotter (Ice) joined the Global Guardians. This led Sigrid to quit the team.

==== Justice League ====
Years later, after Ice had left the Global Guardians, joined the Justice League International, and was killed by the Overmaster, Sigrid re-emerged. She chose to honor the fallen heroine by serving as her replacement in the Justice League.

There were hints of a romantic relationship with her teammate Fire, but this was all part of a plan hatched by Sigrid. Realizing Fire was not coping with Ice's death (and Fire was attempting to control her, much like Sigrid's mother had done growing up), they dressed up to resemble Ice and showed romantic feelings toward Fire. The shock made Fire realize that Ice was gone, and she could not recreate the past. During her time in the JLA, she was disliked and criticized by Guy Gardner, who had also not come to terms with Ice's death.

She left active duty with the League after they and several others were heavily wounded during the attack of the Hyperclan (White Martians). Later recovered, Sigrid resumed her superhero career and is assumed to have eventually joined an unofficial branch of Justice League Europe. That League chapter was, however, infiltrated by Mist, who apparently lured Icemaiden away and subsequently disguised herself as the blue-skinned hero before killing three League members: Crimson Fox, Amazing Man, and Blue Devil.

In the same story, it was revealed that Mist covertly contacted Icemaiden and informed her of a supposed threat facing her homeland of Norway, and she must defeat the threat without informing anyone until afterwards. Icemaiden left during the middle of the night, and Mist replaced her within the JLE by the next morning. The JLE did not know that Mist replaced Icemaiden until Mist began her attacks against them. Mist informed Crimson Fox that the threat she informed Icemaiden about was not real, and that she had sent Icemaiden on an ultimately fruitless search so that she could disguise herself as Icemaiden and replace them on the team.

==== One Year Later ====
After the "Infinite Crisis" storyline, it was revealed that Icemaiden had at some point been abducted by the supervillain Warp, a capture paid for by a mysterious "organ-napper" who turned out to be former actress Delores Winters. Winters—who was believed to have been killed decades earlier by the Ultra-Humanite—longed for new flesh to replace her own aging skin and had her personal physician surgically flay the Icemaiden to harvest her superpowered skin. Icemaiden did not die and eventually was placed, comatose, into a hydration womb within a facility of S.T.A.R. Labs. Later, in the same story, the hydration womb is cracked. It is unknown if Icemaiden survived.

=== Post-Flashpoint ===
==== Infinite Frontier ====
In the "Infinite Frontier" relaunch, Sigrid is reintroduced into the continuity of the DC Universe for the first time since it was reset as part of The New 52. They appear in the 2021 holiday special Tis the Season to Be Freezin' in Andrew Wheeler and Meghan Hetrick's story "Break the Ice" and takes the code name Glacier. Sigrid is referred to using they/them pronouns.

== Powers and abilities ==
Sigrid Nansen possesses abilities surrounding ice, snow and cold. Their powers are not natural, as they are the result of scientific experiments. Whether it was a success because they had a dormant gene is unknown. Icemaiden can control small quantities of snow or ice in varying degrees, such as projecting ice shields and icicles from their body. These capabilities are also closely linked to Sigrid's mental state.

== Personal life ==
Sigrid is bisexual. They were flirtatious with Nuklon during their time together in the JLA, and later became involved with Olivia Reynolds, the ex-girlfriend of Hal Jordan.

They also showed interest in Judaism during their conversations with Nuklon.

In Tis the Season to Be Freezin', Sigrid is identified as non-binary.
