= Justice League of America (film) =

1997 American superhero television film

- Based on: Characters by DC Comics
- Written by: Lorne Cameron; David Hoselton
- Directed by: Félix Enríquez Alcalá; Lewis Teague (uncredited)
- Starring: Matthew Settle; Kim Oja; John Kassir; Michelle Hurd; Kenny Johnston; David Krumholtz; Elisa Donovan; Ron Pearson; David Ogden Stiers; Miguel Ferrer
- Music by: John Debney
- Country of origin: United States
- Original language: English

Production
- Executive producers: Scott Shepherd; Lorne Cameron; David Hoselton
- Producer: Larry Rapaport
- Cinematography: Barry Wilson
- Editor: Ed Rothkowitz
- Running time: 86 minutes

Original release
- Network: CBS
- Release: December 28, 1997

Justice League of America is a 1997 American superhero television film and an unsuccessful pilot produced by CBS and directed by Félix Enríquez Alcalá and Lewis Teague (though the latter went uncredited), based on a team of fictional DC Comics superheroes from the comic of the same name. The film aired on CBS on December 28, 1997. It centers on Tori Olafsdotter, a female meteorologist who gains superpowers and is later inducted into the "Justice League", while the city of New Metro is held for ransom by a terrorist armed with a weather control device.

The film is interjected with mock-interviews of members of the Justice League, speaking about life as a superhero in the past tense, preceding the events of the film.

== Plot ==
Tori Olafsdotter is a meteorologist working at the Eno Meteorological Institute who will later become Ice. The city of New Metro is faced with a tornado controlled by a terrorist calling himself the Weatherman. The Flash dissipates the tornado using his super speed while the other members of the JLA use their powers to save civilians.

Tori stumbles upon a hidden device in the lab where she works. While investigating its use, she spills water on it, and it strikes her with strange blue electricity. She is unharmed and leaves the lab for home, freezing everything she touches. En route, she sees a man drowning; when she attempts to rescue him, the water freezes around her. The JLA, believing her to be the Weatherman, abducts and interrogates her. They release her, and Tori believes it was all simply a bad dream.

The JLA suspects that Tori's timid colleague, Arliss Hopke, is The Weatherman. New Metro is attacked again, this time by golf ball-sized hailstones, but Fire melts them all. The JLA infiltrates a party at the Eno Meteorological Institute looking for evidence that Arliss Hopke is the Weatherman. Tori, however, discovers that it is her boss, Dr. Eno, who is The Weatherman.

Tori takes this knowledge to the JLA, and they, in turn, take her to their secret command center, an alien spacecraft hidden underwater. The JLA's leader J'onn J'onzz introduces himself to Tori, and the other members of the League reveal their secret identities. Tori discovers that Atom is a man with whom she has been flirting. The JLA attempts to train Tori to hone her freezing powers without much success.

Martin Walters, a young man who has been pursuing B.B. DaCosta romantically, watches a news broadcast about the JLA and sees that Fire is wearing earrings that he gave B.B. as a gift. Martin tells B.B. that he knows her secret identity. B.B. secretly alerts the JLA, and J'onn takes the shape of Fire and appears before Martin and B.B. "Fire" claims that B.B. is a close friend who lent "her" the earrings. Martin is embarrassed by his "mistake", and B.B. gently terminates his romantic interest in her, although she assures him that he's a nice guy and that he will find true love someday.

The Weatherman demands $20 million, or he will engulf New Metro in a tidal wave. He attacks the Watchtower using a heat ray. The JLA escapes and devises a plan to stop the Weatherman, leaving Tori behind. They are unsuccessful, but Tori stops it by freezing the tidal wave solid.

The other heroes apologize for leaving Tori behind, and offer her membership again, including a costume and the codename "Ice". Tori forgives them and agrees to their offer. Meanwhile, the Weatherman plans his escape from prison.

== Cast ==
- Matthew Settle as Guy Gardner / Green Lantern, a software salesman.
- Kim Oja as Tori Olafsdotter / Ice, a meteorologist working at Dr. Eno's Meteorological Institute.
- John Kassir as Ray Palmer / The Atom, a science teacher.
- Michelle Hurd as B.B. DaCosta / Fire, a struggling actress.
- Kenny Johnston as Barry Allen / The Flash, unemployed.
- David Krumholtz as Martin Walters, an actor who has a crush on B.B.
- Elisa Donovan as Cheryl, Guy's girlfriend.
- Ron Pearson as Dr. Arliss Hopke, one of Tori's colleagues.
- David Ogden Stiers as J'onn J'onzz / Martian Manhunter, the leader of the JLA.
- Miguel Ferrer as Dr. Eno / The Weather Man, a rival meteorologist.
- Jason Weissbrod as Drazen

== Production ==
=== Initial development at NBC ===
After Warner Bros. Television Studios acquired Lorimar Television in June 1988, then Lorimar President Henry David Salzman decided to use the company's new Warner Bros. connections to mine DC Comics properties for potential TV projects. Salzman called then DC Comics President Jenette Kahn and the two collectively decided a Justice League TV series would be the best option with the 1989 Justice League International by Keith Giffen, J. M. DeMatteis, and Kevin Maguire serving as the main source for the adaptation. After the project was set up at NBC, Jeff Freilich was hired to write the screenplay as he had significant experience in the genre having served as a writer and producer on series such as the 1978 The Incredible Hulk series. On why he agreed to work on the project, Freilich stated:

The New Justice League of America seemed like the most natural television show because it has an ensemble cast of humans who have made themselves into superheroes [except Martian Manhunter].

Freilich enlisted screenwriters David Arnott and James Cappe to assist in writing the pilot script with team lineup for this incarnation consisting of Doctor Fate (Kent Nelson), Maxwell Lord, Martian Manhunter, Booster Gold, Blue Beetle, Fire, Ice, Mister Miracle, Oberon, Inza Nelson (Kent's wife), and Big Barda. Despite being a relatively direct translation of the comics, the writers did make some changes such as Mister Miracle no longer being from New Genesis and would now simply be a human escape artist while Kent and Inza Nelson would also have a son. At this point in development, the producers could not use characters such as Green Lantern and Batman, as those characters were already being utilized for separate projects.

The plot for this incarnation Justice League of America would have begun with the archaeological discovery of a “Black Helmet,” which is promptly stolen from its museum debut by Tibetan monks. Despite Booster Gold's efforts, they escape with the artifact, and Doctor Fate soon discovers a Lord of Chaos—the Black Helmet of Chaos—is loose on the world. Fate's attempted recovery fails, and his helmet is stolen. Chaos wreaks havoc throughout the world, forcing Maxwell Lord to assemble all known heroes— Booster, Martian Manhunter, Fire, Ice, Beetle, and Mr. Miracle—to find Doctor Fate and save the world. After a tour of their headquarters, the team heads off in Blue Beetle's Bug to Salem, Massachusetts to search for the missing Kent Nelson. But they soon return to New York to deal with the mayhem created by the Lord of Chaos. The United Nations falls under siege by terrorists, which means the JLA has to break in quietly. The religious leader, the Dalai Lama, dons the deadly Black Helmet and becomes possessed by the Lords of Chaos. In the cataclysmic conclusion, a nuclear attack is launched by all the superpower nations simultaneously. Blue Beetle's missile deflector saves the day, and when Kent Nelson recovers, he confronts the Lords of Chaos, still using the Lama's body and ultimately saving the city from nuclear annihilation.

Freilich said while NBC was enthusiastic for the show, once they received the final script the network felt the scope and scale involving supernatural antagonists would've been more suited to a feature film rather than a television series which was estimated to have costs around $3 million for the pilot film and $1 million per episode given the level of effects needed to convey some of the sequences scripted. There was some consideration of repurposing the project as a Miniseries, but due to the failure of the 1990 The Flash series, networks were more hesitant in making financial commitments to superhero and comic book-based projects. Freilich stated in hindsight he and his writing team tried to go for a Raiders of the Lost Ark vibe in terms of the tone and style for the series as the suggested route by DC Comics of centering the action on a criminal mastermind planning an elaborate heist felt too familiar and that going with a more supernatural focus as well as the inclusion of Blue Beetle's flying Bug and an action filled New York City set climax played a significant role in the project getting shelved.

=== Revival at CBS ===
In June 1997, it was announced that Warner Bros. Television Studios, motivated by the commercial success of the Grant Morrison penned JLA comic book series, would be producing a TV movie pilot featuring the Justice League titled Justice League of America for CBS with the possibility of being picked up to a weekly series. The team roster was announced to consist of Martian Manhunter, the Barry Allen Flash, the Guy Gardner Green Lantern, The Atom (initially reported as the Al Pratt version), Fire, and Ice. The script was slated to be written by Lorne Cameron and David Hoselton and would take tonal and thematic inspiration from the 80s Justice League International by Keith Giffen and J. M. DeMatteis with a focus on a lighthearted tone and comedic banter among the cast. Filming took place in March of that year in Vancouver, British Columbia, Canada.

In August 1997, it was reported that CBS had not picked up Justice League of America for the 1997–98 fall schedule with no word on if the film would air or possibly be developed as a mid-season replacement By September, Warner Bros. stated that they were still awaiting a decision from CBS regarding Justice League of America. By January 1998, the fate of the film had not been determined. By July of that year, bootleg copies of Justice League of America were circulating through comic book conventions fueling speculation the pilot would not air on CBS.

The initial director of the pilot was Félix Enríquez Alcalá. Executives were unsatisfied with Alcalá's work halfway through production and Alcalá was fired. Lewis Teague was hired to direct reshoots in the hopes that he could save the pilot, but was not afforded the time or resources needed to make the film work and requested that his name be left off the credits.

According to Kenny Johnston, who played the Flash in the pilot, Warner Bros. had high hopes for the series and pitched it as NBC's Friends with the Justice League, which is also why he was directed to play his character similarly to Joey Tribbiani.

== Reception ==
Reviews of the film have been negative. Common complaints are the plot holes, poor special effects, and the League members deviating heavily from their comics counterparts. Critics have also said the film tried to be like "Friends with superpowers". Future JLA writer Mark Waid said the film was "80 minutes of my life I'll never get back".

== Release ==
Justice League of America aired on CBS in the United States on December 28, 1997. It has been shown on television in the UK (Channel 5), Puerto Rico's WAPA-TV (Channel 4), Thailand (Cinemax), Brazil (SBT), Uruguay, Poland (TVN, TVN 7, TV4), Mexico (TV Azteca), South Africa (e.tv), Germany, India and Israel. Bootleg copies have been distributed through conventions, websites and file sharing networks.

== See also ==
- Aquaman another pilot based on a DC character that was not picked up as a series.
- Legends of the Superheroes the previous live-action depiction of the Justice League.
