= Ice (character) =

DC Comics character

- Ice, art by David Nakayama.

Publication information
- Publisher: DC Comics
- First appearance: Justice League International #12 (April 1988)
- Created by: Keith Giffen (writer); J. M. DeMatteis (writer); Kevin Maguire (artist)

In-story information
- Alter ego: Tora Olafsdotter
- Species: Metahuman
- Team affiliations: Justice League; Global Guardians; Justice League International
- Partnerships: Fire; Icemaiden
- Abilities: Cryokinesis

Ice (Tora Olafsdotter) is a superheroine appearing in American comic books published by DC Comics. First appearing in Justice League International #12 (April 1988), the character was created by Keith Giffen, J. M. DeMatteis, and Kevin Maguire. She is a member of the Justice League who possesses cryokinetic abilities and is often associated with fellow superhero Fire. The character has also been associated with the Global Guardians.

Ice has appeared in various media outside comics, primarily television. Jennifer Hale voices Ice in Batman: The Brave and the Bold, while Kimberly Oja portrays her in Justice League of America.

== Publication history ==
Created by Keith Giffen, J. M. DeMatteis, and Kevin Maguire, she first appeared in Justice League International #12 (April 1988).

Ice is a separate character from Icemaiden, although the two are similar in appearance, group affiliation, and powers. When Icemaiden first appeared, she had blue skin and pointy ears, and was named Sigrid Nansen. When the character joined Justice League International, the comic book creators believed that her real name had never been given but they were mistaken.

After Ice is killed, the original Icemaiden joins the Justice League. A backstory revealed that she is the first Icemaiden, and quit the Global Guardians when Tora appeared.

An alternate origin was revealed in Justice League: Generation Lost #12 (2010), written by Judd Winick and art by Fernando Dagnino Guerra.

== Fictional character biography ==
=== Origin ===
The princess of an isolated tribe of magic-wielding Norsemen, Tora Olafsdotter has the natural ability to create and manipulate ice.

In the Danish graphic novel Superman: A Tale of Five Cities, Superman and Lois Lane visit Oslo and encounter Ice (Isjomfruen), a local superhero, and her sister Ice Flower (Isblomst), in Frogner Park.

==== Alternate origin ====
A different origin was presented in Justice League: Generation Lost. It has not been revealed in what respects this story replaces Tora's original history.

In the alternate origin mentioned in Justice League: Generation Lost story, Tora's parents and brother are Romanifolket, and her grandfather was the head of a small sect of Romanifolket known as the Is Bygd. Tora was trained to stay calm to control her metahuman ability to create and manipulate ice, to ensure that her grandfather (from whom Tora's parents sought to hide their daughter) could not find her and force her to use her power to keep control over the other Bygd residents.

=== Global Guardians ===
When an engineer named Rod Schoendienst discovered the ice people, he made a pact with the King that allowed Tora to leave their kingdom. After Rod introduced Tora to Doctor Mist and the Global Guardians she joined the team as the second Icemaiden. Soon after, she became friends with Beatriz da Costa (aka Green Flame). After the Guardians lose their funding from the United Nations in the wake of the Justice League's reformation as Justice League International, Green Flame talks Icemaiden into joining the Justice League.

=== Justice League ===
Green Flame and Icemaiden

Ice's personality is a mix of girl-next-door wholesomeness and innocent-abroad naiveté, which served as a contrast to the impulsive, libidinous traits of her friend and teammate Fire. The two change their names from Green Flame and Icemaiden to Fire and Ice.

Ice later falls under the mental influence of Overmaster. During a confrontation with the Justice League, Ice breaks free of Overmaster's control, only to be killed by him.

=== Resurrection ===
While on a mission in Azerbaijan, Barbara Gordon's Birds of Prey discover Ice unconscious within a Rocket Red suit which they wrest from the possession of an underworld figure, Kerimov. Kerimov has hired the Secret Six to transport the suit, and the Birds of Prey and Secret Six come to blows after Big Barda and Huntress capture it. Kerimov plans to use Ice to manipulate the Russian people by playing on their superstitions about ice princesses, and to use her great power to make himself a powerful ruler.

Tora is awakened by Creote, a member of the team who addresses her as "goddess". She is enraged and attacks the Birds of Prey and the Secret Six, seeking to avenge her murder. Huntress' mention of Guy Gardner, in addition to a hard slap, brings Ice back to her senses.

=== Generation Lost ===
Ice appears as one of the central characters in Justice League: Generation Lost, a maxi-series that takes place during the "Brightest Day" storyline. She is one of many superheroes tasked with hunting down Maxwell Lord, a former ally of the Justice League who murdered Ted Kord. During an encounter with Lord at the Justice League's former headquarters, Ice is rendered unconscious alongside Fire, Booster Gold, and Captain Atom. The former Justice League members awake to discover that Lord has used his mental abilities to erase his existence from the minds of every human on the planet, save for those present at the embassy. and the others. After trying to talk to Guy and tell him what has transpired, Tora discovers that Lord has mentally influenced the world into believing that she had attempted to murder Guy.

Ice, Fire and Rocket Red arrive at a robotics labs and are confronted by the Metal Men, who are being controlled by Professor Ivo. Ice loses control after nearly being beaten to death, transforming her skin and hair into ice. Ice nearly kills the entire team, but calms down as the repressed memories involving the truth about her origins resurface.

=== The New 52 ===
In September 2011, The New 52 rebooted DC's continuity. In this new timeline, Ice is recruited as part of the new U.N.-sponsored Justice League International. She appears to still have some sort of existing relationship with Guy, though it is not expanded upon.

Ice appeared in the 2022 limited series Human Target by Tom King and Greg Smallwood where she was the primary love interest and secondary lead in the series. The series follows the Human Target as he investigates who poisoned him and tried to poison Lex Luthor, with the primary suspects being the Justice League International.

In Absolute Power, Ice loses her powers to Amanda Waller's Amazo army. After the Amazos are defeated, Ice and Fire regain their powers, but have them swapped. Fire and Ice star in the 2024 miniseries Fire & Ice: Welcome to Smallville, where they relocate to Smallville; and the 2025 miniseries Fire & Ice: When Hell Freezes Over, where Fire inadvertently causes herself and Ice to swap bodies after wishing on a monkey's paw to return their powers to normal. Following a journey through Hell, Fire and Ice retrieve the Ring of Nabu and regain their original bodies and powers.

== Powers and abilities ==
In addition to being a proficient hand-to-hand combatant, Ice can project in various forms and quantities of ice and snow through her hands. She can create platforms of ice upon which she can skate. Before her initial death, she was powered-up mysteriously (later revealed to be the result of the Overmaster). She was able to generate larger amounts of ice and snow, and gained superhuman strength and the ability to fly.

== Other versions ==
- An alternate universe variant of Ice from Earth-9, formerly Earth-96, appears in the Tangent Comics imprint. This version is a supervillain and a member of the Fatal Five.
- A possible future variant of Ice appears in Justice League 3000. Having survived to the 31st century, she has become darker and less heroic. Nonetheless, she reverts to her original personality after encountering Beatriz.

== In other media ==
=== Television ===
Ice as depicted in Batman: The Brave and the Bold

- Ice appears in Justice League of America, portrayed by Kimberly Oja. This version is an American meteorologist named Tori Olafsdotter who acquired her powers after being exposed to Weather Wizard's weather machine and later enters a relationship with the Atom.
- Ice makes non-speaking appearances in Justice League Unlimited as a member of the Justice League.
- Ice appears in Batman: The Brave and the Bold, voiced by Jennifer Hale. This version is a founding member of Justice League International.
- Ice appears in the Robot Chicken DC Comics Special, voiced by Clare Grant.
- Ice appears in the Mad segment "That's What Super Friends Are For".
- Ice makes non-speaking appearances in Young Justice as a member of the Justice League.

=== Video games ===
- Ice appears as a non-player character (NPC) in DC Universe Online.
- Ice appears as a character summon in Scribblenauts Unmasked: A DC Comics Adventure.

=== Merchandise ===
- At Toy Fair 2007, Mattel announced Fire and Ice action figures would be released as part of the Justice League Unlimited line.
- A figure of Ice with her Global Guardians suit was released as part of a DC Direct Justice League International set designed by Kevin Maguire.
- In 2025, McFarlane Toys released a seven inch action figure, based on the artwork of David Nakayama, in their DC Multiverse line.
