= Olivia Reynolds =

- Art by Mark Bright

Publication information
- Publisher: DC Comics
- First appearance: Green Lantern (vol. 2) #71 (1969)
- Created by: John Broome; Gil Kane

In-story information
- Alter ego: Olivia Reynolds
- Abilities: U-Mind (which contains a civilization living in her brain)

Olivia Reynolds is a fictional character in the DC Comics universe. She has a latent superpower (the U-Mind), and has been abducted by various races who wanted to harness the power, and temporarily became a villainess. All memories of her experiences with the U-Mind have now been blocked after she was mindwiped.

She is bisexual and has been romantically linked to both Green Lantern and Icemaiden.

== Fictional character biography ==
A toy saleswoman and rival of Hal Jordan, Olivia later became his girlfriend. For a long time, she was unaware of her latent power, her U-Mind that sustained an entire race (the Lenglyns of Lengyl). When the alien Mogrians seek to retrieve the U-Mind, Hal (as Green Lantern) and Flash battle them to save Olivia as well as the Lenglyns.

Green Lantern (vol. 3) #29: Olivia Reynolds returns to face Hal Jordan.

The Weaponers of Qward kidnap Olivia, seeking to use her U-Mind to tap into a power called the Ergono and open the obelisk, a monument left behind by the ancient Qwardians. Hal and Eli Bently (Olivia's physician) save her, but not before the obelisk is shattered.

Olivia returns as a representative for the new Green Lantern toyline and renews her relationship with Hal Jordan. The Lenglyns and the Weaponers of Qward attempt to control the Ergono power by abducting Olivia and Aleea Strange (daughter of Adam Strange), who also possesses the U-Mind power. A band of Qward soldiers capture Olivia again, hoping that her presence will help them oppose the Weaponers. This time, the power of the Ergono usurps her. Driven mad with power, Olivia seeks to become queen of Qward. Hal and Adam Strange rescue Olivia from the Ergono's control, and then Hal wiped clean Olivia's memories of her U-Mind and any events on Qward.

Still later, Olivia became her toy company's liaison with Guy Gardner and the Justice League, responsible for developing Guy Gardner: Warrior and Justice League America toylines. During this time, she had a flirtation with Icemaiden. It is unknown if their relationship developed further.

== Powers and abilities ==
Known as the "U-Mind", Olivia Reynolds's mind sustains an entire alien race, the Lenglyns of Lengyl. The U-Mind is used to control the Ergono power (a power similar to the Anti-Life Equation).

== See also ==
- Anti-Life Equation
