= Rocket Red =

- Gavril Ivanovich, Justice League International's second Rocket Red; art by Aaron Lopresti.

Publication information
- Publisher: DC Comics
- First appearance: Dmitri Pushkin; Justice League #3 (July 1987); Gavril Ivanovich; Justice League: Generation Lost #4 (August 2010)
- Created by: Pushkin; Steve Englehart (writer); Joe Staton (artist); Ivanovich; Judd Winick (writer); Joe Bennett (artist)

In-story information
- Full name: Dimitri Pushkin; Gavril Ivanovich
- Team affiliations: Justice League; Rocket Red Brigade; Justice League International; Justice League Europe; Pushkin: Black Lantern Corps
- Notable aliases: Rocket Red #4
- Abilities: Superhuman strength and durability; Flight; Energy blasts; Technology manipulation

Rocket Red (Russian: Ракетно-Красный, romanized: Raketno-Krasnyy) is a superhero appearing in the DC Comics universe. Created by Steve Englehart and Joe Staton, he first appeared in Green Lantern Corps #208 (January 1987), appearing shortly afterward in Justice League #3 (July 1987); Rocket Red was inducted into the Justice League in Justice League #7 (November 1987).

The term "Rocket Reds" refers to any member of the Rocket Red Brigade; the name in the singular is used to refer to the three individual characters named Rocket Red who were members of the Justice League. These comprise the original Rocket Red #7 (later revealed as an android), Dmitri Pushkin (Rocket Red #4), and Gavril Ivanovich.

== Fictional character biography ==
=== Dmitri Pushkin ===
Dmitri Pushkin's second Rocket Red armor, art by Ty Templeton.

Dmitri Pushkin (Rocket Red #4) joins the Justice League International after Rocket Red #7 is revealed to be a Manhunter. A kind-hearted and jolly man with a taste for American culture, Pushkin serves with the Justice League International for many years.

When his armor is destroyed by Lobo, he replaces it with a more advanced model made on Apokolips. Rocket Red later joins Justice League Europe, with Maxwell Lord arranging for his wife Belina and their two children, Mischa and Tascha, to live with him at the League's Paris embassy.

In the 2005 series The OMAC Project, Pushkin is killed while protecting the Justice League's members. He has remained dead since, but was temporarily resurrected as a Black Lantern during the Blackest Night event in 2009.

In the Booster Gold series, Rocket Red's grandfather, Sergei Pushkin, is revealed to have been a Russian scientist working with the U.S. on the space race in 1952. After being exposed as a traitor working for Russia, Pushkin is placed under house arrest, working on the Rocket Red armor in secret. Pushkin dies before completing the suit, which was finished by his son.

=== Gavril Ivanovich ===
The 2010 ongoing series Justice League: Generation Lost introduced Gavril Ivanovich. In this title, several members of the erstwhile JLI, pursuing a group of OMACs controlled by the resurrected Maxwell Lord, encounter a fight among a group of Rocket Reds incited by Ivanovich who remains loyal to the old Communist cause and is resistant to the capitalist values of the modern Rocket Red brigade. He also sports a bulkier, outdated Rocket Red armor that resembles Pushkin's armor rather than the sleek, modern suits worn by the other members of the brigade. The Justice League members intervene to prevent collateral damage, and Ivanovich joins the group.

In The New 52 continuity, Ivanovich is reintroduced in the ongoing series Justice League International as a member of a United Nations-assembled superhero team led by Booster Gold. After helping to repel an invasion by the alien conqueror Peraxxus, Ivanovich is killed in an explosion during a press conference introducing the team.

== Powers and abilities ==
The versions of Rocket Red were originally created for the Soviet Union by Kilowog and the Rocket Red Brigade — normal human beings enhanced using "forced evolution" and armored battle suits — proudly defended the USSR.

Their abilities included super strength, invulnerability, flight, the ability to project powerful energy blasts, and "mecha-empathy", the ability to sense and control computers and machines.

== In other media ==
=== Television ===
- The Dmitri Pushkin incarnation of Rocket Red makes non-speaking appearances in Justice League Unlimited as a member of the Justice League.
- The Dmitri Pushkin incarnation of Rocket Red makes a non-speaking appearance in the Batman: The Brave and the Bold episode "Crisis: 22,300 Miles Above Earth!" as a member of Justice League International.
- The Dmitri Pushkin incarnation of Rocket Red appears in the Young Justice episode "Leverage", voiced by Steve Blum. This version is a new member of the Rocket Red Brigade.

=== Merchandise ===
- The Dmitri Pushkin incarnation of Rocket Red received an action figure in Mattel's DC Universe: Justice League Unlimited Fan Collection toy line.
- An unidentified incarnation of Rocket Red received an action figure in Mattel's Signature Series, available through Mattel's online outlet at MattyCollector.com.
