= Justice League: Generation Lost =

Comic book limited series

- Cover art for Justice League: Generation Lost #1, art by Tony Harris.

Publication information
- Publisher: DC Comics
- Schedule: Bi-weekly
- Format: Limited series
- Genre: Superhero
- Publication date: July 2010 – April 2011
- No. of issues: 24
- Main character: Justice League International

Creative team
- Written by: Keith Giffen (issues #1–6); Judd Winick (issues #1–24)
- Penciller: Aaron Lopresti
- Inker: Matt Ryan
- Letterer: Sal Cipriano
- Colorist: Hi-Fi Colour
- Editor(s): Rex Ogle; Michael Siglain (#1–6) Brian Cunningham (#6–24)

Collected editions
- Volume 1 (hardcover): ISBN 1-4012-3020-2
- Volume 2 (hardcover): ISBN 1401232833
- Volume 1 (paperback): ISBN 1401232256

Justice League: Generation Lost is a comic book limited series that premiered in July 2010. It ran twice a month for 24 issues, alternating with Brightest Day, which was written by Geoff Johns and Peter Tomasi.

== Publication history ==
The series was written by Keith Giffen and Judd Winick. The breakdowns were done by Giffen up to issue #7, when he left the series, while the art was supplied by a rotating team of pencillers and inkers, namely Aaron Lopresti and Matt Ryan; Joe Bennett and Jack Jadson; and Fernando Dagnino and Raul Fernandez. The covers were supplied by Tony Harris and J.D. Mettler, Cliff Chiang, and Dustin Nguyen, with variant covers by Kevin Maguire. The book was edited by Michael Siglain. The comic saw the return of the Justice League International, which has not been seen since the mid-1990s.

The series also connected to Giffen's run on Booster Gold vol. 2 and Winick's run on Power Girl. In addition, Teen Titans #83 was used to explain why Blue Beetle would be taking a leave of absence from the Titans, and the events of Generation Lost #2 are indirectly mentioned there as well. The Brightest Day maxi-series also touches on the comic's events as one issue reveals that Deadman remembers Maxwell Lord and, after briefly receiving a White Ring, Bruce Wayne is shown radioing a mysterious person saying he needs to talk about Lord. Issue #18 of Power Girl confirms that she also now remembers Lord's existence. In the following issue, she calls a meeting of the Justice Society to tell them with Batman in attendance, but midway through, everyone forgets what they were talking about (an apparent effect of the mindwipe).

== Plot summary ==
The plot revolves around the Justice League International, specifically the characters Captain Atom, Booster Gold, Jaime Reyes (the third Blue Beetle), Fire, Ice, and Rocket Red, and their hunt for the recently resurrected Maxwell Lord. As the series begins, Lord is the subject of an international manhunt by every law enforcement agency and super-hero on the planet. Booster Gold finds him hiding in the abandoned Justice League International embassy in New York, but Lord defeats Booster Gold, leaving him bloody and unconscious. When Captain Atom, Ice, Fire, and Skeets, arrive, they discover that Lord has used a machine to amplify his mind control powers to an unprecedented level. Superman arrives soon afterward but, when they inform him of Lord's narrow escape, Superman indicates that he has no memory of who Lord is.

The team soon discover that Lord has erased all memory of his existence from the minds of everyone but the four of them. The four try to relate the truth to other heroes but are universally disbelieved. When confronted with an image of Wonder Woman killing Lord, Superman reports that he sees only a photo of Wonder Woman alone. When Booster Gold shows the same images to Batman (Dick Grayson) he tells Booster Gold that, as far as the world knows, Bruce Wayne (instead of Maxwell Lord) restarted the Justice League, Lex Luthor usurped the OMAC project and Ted Kord committed suicide. Soon, Fire is informed she has failed a psych exam and is dismissed from Checkmate, Guy Gardner claims Ice tried to kill him, and Captain Atom is tricked by Lord into attacking a general and having to fight his way out of an Air Force base. Booster Gold is not subject to any such character assassination, his reputation among the superhuman community being already poor, but the four realize Lord is trying to isolate and discredit them.

Before the team can decide how to proceed, they are called to the aid of Blue Beetle, whose family are under attack from a squad of OMACs. It transpires that the alien scarab that gives Beetle his powers also remembers Lord (since it, like Skeets, is an artificial intelligence). To escape the OMACs Beetle teleports the group to Russia, where they are confronted by the Rocket Red Brigade. The brigade are battling a rogue Rocket Red, an old-time Communist who hates what Russia has become. The heroes, initially reluctant to become involved, enter the fray when the battle endangers civilians, separating the attacking Red - later identified as Gavril Ivanovich - from the group. The team's roster thus expanded, Booster Gold realizes that Lord is manipulating them into recreating the lineup of the old JLI. Via a comms device in the armour of a fallen Rocket Red, Lord tells them he excluded them deliberately from the mindwipe in an effort to protect them, and offers them a chance to work with him in "saving the world".

The team refuse to cooperate with Lord and Captain Atom tells the group that, after an explosion shown in issue #1, he was thrown forwards in time to a postapocalyptic future in which an aged and crippled Power Girl warned him that Lord was responsible for a superhuman war that plunged the world into disaster. Captain Atom entreats the rest of the group to help him fight Lord, and they infiltrate Checkmate Headquarters to try to stop him. Lord then receives a vision from the Life Entity, who was responsible for his resurrection. It tells him to stop Magog from plunging the world into war (later supplementing this with visions of scenes taken directly from the series Kingdom Come, in which Magog is responsible for the destruction of Kansas), and shows Lord images of himself killing a distraught Magog with Magog's own staff. When the team next encounter Lord, after mind-controlling Fire and then Booster Gold to prevent them from stopping him, he ports from the old JLI embassy back to Checkmate, where he attempts to provoke Magog into a fatal fight with Captain Atom.

Meanwhile, Power Girl and Batman both come close to identifying Lord during separate investigations, but lose their train of thought when on the verge of remembering his history. The League, meanwhile, find evidence that Lord has been assembling secret robotics labs; Fire, Ice and Rocket Red go to visit one only to be confronted by the Metal Men. In the ensuing battle Ice's powers mutate to new levels, causing her briefly to go mad as she remembers the truth of her origins. Elsewhere, Booster Gold, Blue Beetle and Captain Atom are investigating an abandoned base when Captain Atom is assailed by Magog. Magog and Captain Atom battle in the heart of Chicago, where Captain Atom is able at length to convince Magog that he is being manipulated. Magog, remembering Lord's existence, ceases the attack, but Lord is on hand and mind-controls Magog into killing himself with his spear. Lord then uses his powers to convince bystanders and the media that Captain Atom killed Magog. He then receives a message from the Entity, saying he "has averted war. Life returned".

As horrified witnesses accuse him of murder, Captain Atom realizes Magog's spear is about to explode with energy. He tries to absorb as much as he can, but the force thrusts him once again into the time stream. This time he finds himself just a century into the future: again he meets Power Girl, presently the head of an incarnation of the Justice League, whom he tries to help in a disastrous battle against a new form of OMACs, who quickly overwhelm the team. Power Girl, critically injured, tells Captain Atom that the tipping point for the world's descent into chaos was Lord's murder of Wonder Woman. A final assault on an OMAC engine prompts an explosion that restores Captain Atom to his own time, equipped with knowledge about how to stop Lord.

Lord, preparing to strike at Wonder Woman, then discovers - and is conscious of the irony - that abruptly all memory of Wonder Woman has disappeared from the world, just as he was forgotten following his mindwipe. Simultaneously, Captain Atom tries to convince a reluctant Booster Gold that they need to kill Lord before he can kill Wonder Woman, only to discover that Blue Beetle and Rocket Red also lack memories of her and Skeets has no records of her in his database - she is remembered only by the core four unaffected by Lord's initial mindwipe. The group are then attacked by the Creature Commandos, with Fire sustaining several gunshot wounds at close range. Batman and Power Girl are informed by Checkmate that messages indicate Magog thought he was being ordered by Checkmate to kill Atom and they forensic evidence indicates Atom may not have caused the explosion. In the battle with the Creature Commandos, Blue Beetle grabs one Commando to force him to use his healing power on Fire. Lord reveals that he set up the events to teleport away with Blue Beetle.

The League defend themselves against the Creature Commandos, who suddenly stop fighting, realizing they do not know why they're so far from their base. At the United Nations, Taleb is defending Checkmate against a Security Council meeting, who believe he has lost control, blaming him for Magog's attack and other events. They revoke Checkmate's charter and Taleb rants at White King Alton Janus about how this means the end of the organization, but Janus replies it's merely the beginning. He teleports them to a secret base as Taleb realizes that Janus has been manipulating him all this time, pushing him to actions that would destroy Checkmate. Lord then appears in order to reveal that he is the real brains and uses his power to transform Taleb into an OMAC as a horrified Blue Beetle looks on in captivity. The League tracks down a lead on where they took Blue Beetle but Captain Atom finds himself attacked by Power Girl, who has been pushed by Lord to blame Atom for the destruction in Chicago and is out to bring him down. Tortured by Lord, Blue Beetle remembers him as Lord reveals that the mind-wipe (which could only be done once) feeds off psychic energy so the more people around, the faster some will forget. Captain Atom fights Power Girl, realizing that thanks to Lord, she sees him as an out-of-control Superman and is not holding back. The JLI help but Power Girl sees them as other Justice Leaguers and continues to fight. Booster Gold gets Rocket Red to attack Kara with high-powered sonics, rattling her concentration. This allows Power Girl to free herself of Lord's control and remembers everything. She then decides to join the rest of the JLI to take Lord down.

While Power Girl wants to help the others, Booster Gold says she can do more by telling everyone about Lord. Rocket Red worries she will forget again but she insists Lord's influence is broken and flies off. Meanwhile, Lord tells a captive Jaime that he used the JLI to make Checkmate look ineffective so he could take it over. The Scarab manages to withstand the torture to send a signal out, telling the JLI where Blue Beetle is. They fly to a massive headquarters, shaped like a robotic horse piece as Beetle breaks out of the lab to attack Lord. The rest of the team arrives just in time to see Lord using a blaster to shoot Blue Beetle in the head. Lord escapes as the JLI try but fail to revive Jaime. Meanwhile, Power Girl tries to convince Dick Grayson of the truth behind Ted Kord's death, going so far as to exhume Kord's body for Dick to examine. Dick refuses, but Bruce Wayne enters to reveal that he remembers Lord's existence. He and Dick examine the body together, and Bruce makes Dick see the evidence that Ted was murdered, telling him to remember it. He and Kara then go to join up with the JLI.

The team is dealing with the loss of Jaime. Captain Atom is feeling guilt over being blamed for all the deaths in Chicago and confessing to Ice how he no longer feels human. Fire surprises herself by kissing Gavril. Booster Gold blames himself for leading the team into so much danger, feeling his reputation as a joke makes him less trustworthy and does not want to be the leader anymore. The rest of the team overhear his ranting and say they believe in him, knowing what a hero he truly is. Booster Gold is still upset, saying they cannot win against Lord when Blue Beetle suddenly sits up, his wound healed, declaring he knows what Lord's plan is and how to stop him. Blue Beetle explains his armor protected him from the blast as it hacked Lord's computers. Batman and Power Girl arrive to aid the team, discovering that Lord is organizing some sort of attack on Wonder Woman. While Power Girl does not remember Diana, Batman does, due to his exposure to the White Lantern, and knows she is in New York. The team find her investigating the deaths of Amazons. Lord uses a device to enhance his mental powers, turning people around the world into OMACs' to attack Wonder Woman and the JLI. Too late, Batman realizes that since Lord cannot find information on Wonder Woman, he has used the JLI to track her down. The OMAC army then teleports Wonder Woman and the JLI (with the exception of Batman, Power Girl, and Atom) to Los Angeles. Lord sends down OMAC Prime, a huge robot he controls to attack the heroes. Booster manages to track down Lord's flying headquarters, attacking it to come face-to-face with Lord. At the same time, the rest of the team fights OMAC Prime, only to realize the robot can duplicate all of their powers.

During the battle, Captain Atom allows OMAC Prime to take some of his powers, only to suck away much of its energy, threatening to overload himself. Blue Beetle attacks, and OMAC Prime appears to take his power but ends up being infected by the Scarab's power. This allows Beetle to attack and destroy OMAC Prime. Booster Gold and Lord fight it out, Lord still defending his actions, while Booster Gold points out what a hypocrite he is, claiming to be defending humanity yet killing thousands. They end up falling through the sky out of the headquarters, Booster Gold saving Lord at the last moment, but Lord uses his powers to hold Booster Gold at bay when an overloaded Captain Atom flies down to grab him. Captain Atom tells Lord he is going to be sucked into the timestream, and he will take Lord with him, knowing that for a control freak like Lord, being in a strange time and place would be a nightmare. Desperate, Lord agrees to Captain Atom's demand: that he undo the mindwipe and let the world remember him. Once it's completed, Atom lets go and is sucked away as Lord teleports away. Later, Lord posts a video online where he blames Professor Ivo for Magog's rampage and claims he was still trying to defend the world and will continue to do so in secret. Booster Gold is angry that Lord ended up winning but Batman says that it is not over and shows Booster Gold his plan: A new Justice League International.

== Collected editions ==
- Justice League: Generation Lost Volume One (collects Justice League: Generation Lost #1–12, 320 pages, hardcover, April 2011, ISBN 1-4012-3020-2; paperback, February 2012, ISBN 1-4012-3225-6)
- Justice League: Generation Lost Volume Two (collects Justice League: Generation Lost #13–24, 320 pages, hardcover, October 2011, ISBN 1-4012-3283-3)
