= Fire (character) =

DC Comics superhero

- Fire taken from a variant cover of The Human Target #7 (November 2022) Art by Stanley Lau.

Publication information
- Publisher: DC Comics
- First appearance: Super Friends #25 (October 1979)
- Created by: E. Nelson Bridwell (writer); Ramona Fradon (artist)

In-story information
- Alter ego: Beatriz Bonilla Da Costa
- Species: Metahuman
- Place of origin: Brazil
- Team affiliations: Checkmate; Global Guardians; Justice League; Justice League International; Justice League Task Force
- Partnerships: Ice; Icemaiden
- Notable aliases: B. B. da Costa, Green Fury, Green Flame, Black King's Knight
- Abilities: Green pyrokinesis; Ability to become a being purely composed of living green fire; Pyrokinetic flight; Intangibility; Pyroplasmic form

Fire (Beatriz Bonilla Da Costa) is a superheroine appearing in American comic books published by DC Comics. Created by E. Nelson Bridwell and Ramona Fradon, the character debuted in Super Friends #25 (October 1979), where she was known as Green Fury. Fire is a Brazilian superhero with the ability to control green flames and fly. She is a member of Justice League International and partner of fellow superhero Ice.

Beatriz Da Costa is noted as the first Latin American female superhero in mainstream American comics, and the fourth Latin American superhero.

Fire has appeared in other media, being played by Michelle Hurd in the 1997 pilot film Justice League of America, Natalie Morales in the 2017 series Powerless, and voiced by Maria Canals-Barrera in the animated series Justice League Unlimited.

== Publication history ==
The original version of Beatriz first appeared in Super Friends #25 (October 1979) and was created by E. Nelson Bridwell and Ramona Fradon. This character was known as Green Fury and joined the Global Guardians.

The character debuted in the mainstream DC universe in DC Comics Presents #46 (1982) as the Green Flame. After the Crisis on Infinite Earths, she joined Justice League International (Vol. 1) starting with issue #14 (1988), alongside fellow Global Guardian, Ice Maiden. They would later change their names to Fire and Ice, respectively.

Fire returned for the New 52 reboot, debuting in Justice League International (Vol. 3) #1 (November, 2011). Fire and Ice star in two 6-issue miniseries following Absolute Power; Fire & Ice: Welcome to Smallville (2024), and Fire & Ice: When Hell Freezes Over (2025).

== Fictional character biography ==
=== Pre-Crisis ===
==== Super Friends ====
Beatriz as the Green Fury.

Beatriz da Costa, alias Green Fury, is the president of the Brazilian branch of Wayne Enterprises. Due to Brazilian mysticism, she possesses an array of abilities which includes the power to exhale vast quantities of mystical green fire. She can also fly, alter her clothing at will, and display a limited capacity to project hallucinations. In her first appearance, she confronts and battles Superman, who is controlled by the "puppet master" Overlord, Sandor Fine. In her next appearance, Green Fury calls the Super Friends to help defeat the villain Green Thumb (Fargo Keyes), and months later reveals her secret origin to them to thwart the demons from a green hell.

==== Global Guardians ====
Green Fury becomes a member of the Global Guardians when Superman, recruited by Doctor Mist, asks for assistance in locating one of many ancient artifacts being pursued by a group of mystics. They battle a wizard called El Dorado in an ancient city deep in the jungle. The two face off against 'spirit jaguars' and seemingly lose the artifact, a crown, to the wizard. Costa then assists Superman and other Guardians in battling the wizards, El Dorado included, on Easter Island. The heroes catch a break after learning that Superman swapped the artifacts with fakes. This prevents the rise to power of the entity the wizards followed, Thaumar Dhai. Though not as powerful as planned, Dhai was still a threat. Green Fury's mystical based powers were essential in destroying him.

=== Post-Crisis ===
After the Crisis on Infinite Earths, her history is altered. Renamed Beatriz Bonilla da Costa, she starts as an amateur model on the beaches of Rio, then becoming a showgirl and stage performer before finding herself serving as a top secret agent for Brazilian government's SNI (Serviço Nacional de Informações - National Information Service), actually ABIN (Agência Brasileira de Inteligência - Brazilian Intelligence Agency). In the course of one of her missions, Beatriz is trapped in a pyroplasmic explosion that gives her the ability to exhale fire. She assumes the identity of Green Fury, and then changes it again to Green Flame. She joins the international superhero team the Global Guardians, of which she is a longtime member.

==== Justice League ====
In the wake of the formation the Justice League International, the Guardians' United Nations funding is withdrawn. Beatriz convinces her teammate and best friend Icemaiden into joining her to apply for Justice League International membership. In the wake of Black Canary's resignation and the abduction of several members, the short-handed JLI takes them on. Eventually, she once again changes her heroic name, this time to Fire in affinity with Icemaiden's shortening of her name to simply Ice. As a result of the "gene bomb" detonated by the alien Dominators, Fire's powers are dramatically increased, but are less reliable for a time.

Fire assumes a big sister role with Ice, watching out for her and her interactions with the "real" world. For example, Fire steps in when Ice does not realize she is being stalked by a delusional fan. However, Fire herself makes mistakes, such as torching the cash she'd just saved while foiling a bank robbery.

Beatriz remains with Justice League International for the remainder of its existence — in fact, she serves the longest tenure of any JLI member. During this time, she is also trained in the arts of battle by Big Barda.

In the battle against Doomsday, Beatriz loses her powers by taxing them to their limits. She remains with the team but by the time she returns in Justice League America #88, it is too late to help prevent her best friend's death, as Ice is killed by the Overmaster. As Beatriz tries to cope with this loss, she briefly has a romantic relationship with Ice's former lover, Guy Gardner, and a longer one with Nuklon. When the first Icemaiden, Sigrid Nansen, joins the League in Ice's place, Fire befriends her. However, their friendship is tainted by Bea's irrational grief-driven behavior, and Sigrid's romantic attraction to Bea.

When this League collapses, Beatriz returns to Brazil and tries to re-establish herself as the country's main protector. This meets with varied success, which she blames partly on Martian Manhunter's prominence in the Southern hemisphere.

==== The Super Buddies ====
Fire tries to retire from being a superhero and establish a career as an internet glamor girl when Maxwell Lord talks her and several other former JLI members into reforming as a group of "heroes for the common man" called the "Super Buddies". She finds herself sharing an apartment with Mary Marvel and, in a characterization reminiscent of her relationship with Ice, becomes a reluctant "babysitter" for the naive teenager.

In one adventure with the Super Buddies, Fire and the others are given the opportunity to rescue Ice's spirit from Hell (or a similar dimension). Yet like in the Greek myth of Orpheus and Eurydice, Fire cannot resist looking behind her, which causes Ice's spirit to vanish. During the Super Buddies' time in Hell, Etrigan the Demon suggests that it was Fire who was fated to die instead of Ice.

Later, during her time in the group, she encounters an alternate universe version of Ice.

==== Infinite Crisis ====
The Super Buddies do not realize that Maxwell Lord is also secretly the Black King of Checkmate. After the Buddies' dissolution, Beatriz becomes an agent of Checkmate working for Amanda Waller, who took over Checkmate after Lord's death. One of Fire's first missions is to retrieve Brother Eye, which had crash-landed in Saudi Arabia. This plan is thwarted by Sasha Bordeaux, also formerly of Checkmate.

She appears later, criticizing Booster Gold for his shameless self-promotion while the search continues for the missing superheroes. She is also on hand at a memorial for Ralph Dibny's wife Sue.

==== Checkmate ====
Nearly one year later, after the Crisis, Checkmate is reformed under the supervision of the United Nations and Beatriz becomes the Black King's Knight. Though she no longer reports to Waller (who is made White Queen), Waller blackmails Beatriz with evidence against her father and forces her to perform covert assassinations. It is revealed that, as a child, Bea was trained to kill by her father. Despite her past, Beatriz expresses remorse over taking part in a Checkmate mission that results in the deaths of as many as 50 Kobra agents, many of whom are immolated by Fire herself.

==== Reunited with Ice ====
In Checkmate #16, Fire is reunited with Ice following her resurrection in the pages of Birds of Prey.

Their renewed relationship is referenced again during a date between Ice and her lover Guy Gardner. Ice refuses his proposal to cohabit on Oa, as she decided to get her life together on Earth, with some help from Beatriz. Gardner claims that Fire is manipulating Ice.

==== Generation Lost ====
Fire appears as one of the central characters in Justice League: Generation Lost, a maxi-series that takes place during the wider Brightest Day event. At the start of the series, Fire is recruited as part of a massive group of superheroes tasked with hunting down the JLI's founder and Ted Kord's murderer, Maxwell Lord. During an encounter with Lord at the Justice League's former New York headquarters, Fire is rendered unconscious alongside Ice, Booster Gold, and Captain Atom. The former Justice League members awake to discover that Lord has used his mental abilities to erase his existence from the minds of every single human on the planet, save for those present at the embassy. After she tries to tell Wonder Woman of her killing of Lord, Wonder Woman refuses to believe it. Fire discovers that Lord has mentally influenced the world into believing that Checkmate has dismissed her for failing her psychological evaluation.

Afterward, Fire encounters Lord in JLI headquarters. After mind-controlling Fire and then Booster Gold to prevent them from stopping him, he ports from the old JLI embassy back to Checkmate. Before they can figure out their next move, the base comes under attack by the Creature Commandos. Caught while powered down, Fire is shown having been shot several times. Fire is healed by Khalis, but is unable to keep Blue Beetle from being kidnapped by Maxwell Lord. While the team deals with the apparent loss of Blue Beetle, Fire bonds with Gavril Ivanovich, the current Rocket Red, and the two grow close, eventually sharing a passionate kiss.

=== The New 52 ===
In The New 52 reboot, Fire appears as a member of Justice League International. Fire is injured toward the end of the first story arc and is sidelined for the remainder of the run.

In Absolute Power, Fire and Ice lose her powers to Amanda Waller's Amazo army. After the Amazos are defeated, the two regain their powers, but have them swapped. Fire and Ice star in the 2024 miniseries Fire & Ice: Welcome to Smallville, where they relocate to Smallville; and the 2025 miniseries Fire & Ice: When Hell Freezes Over, where Fire inadvertently causes herself and Ice to swap bodies after wishing on a monkey's paw to return their powers to normal. Following a journey through Hell, Fire and Ice retrieve the Ring of Nabu and regain their original bodies and powers.

== Powers and abilities ==
The original Green Fury had the ability to breathe mystical green fire from her mouth. She was also able to create and cast illusions with her "dazzle power" and fire blasts with her white-hot flame or super-cold freezing flame. Her green flame had the magical ability to heal and repair her costume after a battle. Beatriz was also trained by Batman in hand-to-hand combat. In post-Crisis continuity, Green Fury never had any of these magical powers and had a new revised origin.

In her post-Crisis incarnation, Fire initially only possesses fire breath. During the Invasion! crossover event, the Dominators' bomb magnifies Fire's abilities, giving her the ability to transform into a pure plasma being and become intangible.

== In other media ==
=== Television ===
- Fire appears in Justice League Unlimited, voiced by Maria Canals-Barrera. This version is a member of the Justice League.
- Fire appears in Batman: The Brave and the Bold, voiced by Grey DeLisle. This version directs her powers through her hands instead of her mouth and is a founding member of Justice League International. Additionally, an alternate universe variant named Blaze makes a non-speaking appearance in the episode "Deep Cover for Batman!" as a member of the Injustice Syndicate.
- Fire appears in the Mad segment "That's What Super Friends Are For".
- Fire, as "Green Fury", appears in Powerless, portrayed by Natalie Morales.

=== Film ===
Fire appears in Justice League of America, portrayed by Michelle Hurd.

=== Video games ===
- Fire appears in DC Universe Online, voiced by Shawn Sides.
- Fire appears as a character summon in Scribblenauts Unmasked: A DC Comics Adventure.

=== Miscellaneous ===
Fire makes non-speaking background appearances in DC Super Hero Girls as a student of Super Hero High.
