= Flashpoint (comics) =

American comic story arc by DC Comics

- Cover of Flashpoint#1 (May 2011). Art by Alex Sinclair, Andy Kubert, Sandra Hope, Nathan Eyring, Aspen MLT Inc.
- Publisher: DC Comics
- Publication date: May – August 2011
- Genre: Superhero
Title(s)
Flashpoint - 5 issues (main series)
- Main character(s): Barry Allen; Reverse-Flash (Eobard Thawne); Batman (Thomas Wayne); Cyborg; Booster Gold; Wonder Woman; Aquaman

Creative team
- Writer: Geoff Johns
- Artist: Andy Kubert
- Hardcover: ISBN 1-4012-3337-6

"Flashpoint" is a 2011 comic book crossover story arc published by DC Comics. Consisting of an eponymous core limited series and a number of tie-in titles, the storyline premiered in May 2011. The core miniseries was written by Geoff Johns and pencilled by Andy Kubert. The series radically changes the status quo for the DC Universe, leading into the publisher's 2011 relaunch, The New 52.

Flashpoint details an altered DC Universe in which only Barry Allen seems to be aware of significant differences between the regular timeline and the altered one, including Cyborg's place as the world's quintessential hero, much like Superman is in the main timeline, with Superman himself being held captive as a lab-rat by the United States government within an underground facility in Metropolis. In addition, Thomas Wayne is Batman, and a war between Wonder Woman and Aquaman has decimated western Europe.

Consisting of a 61 issue run, the series crossed over with Booster Gold, sixteen separate three-issue miniseries, and a number of one-shots beginning in June 2011. Flash #12 was the last in the series; a thirteenth issue was announced for sale in May of the same year, but was withdrawn.

A sequel series, Flashpoint Beyond, debuted in 2022, with Johns returning to write the series alongside Jeremy Adams and Tim Sheridan.

The storyline is adapted in the film Justice League: The Flashpoint Paradox as well as in the third season of The CW television series The Flash. Elements of the storyline are also adapted into a feature film adaptation of The Flash as part of the DC Extended Universe.

== Plot ==
Barry Allen wakes up to discover everything and everyone around him has changed. He is not the Flash, nor does he have powers. His mother Nora Allen (deceased in his own timeline) is alive; his father, Henry Allen, died of a heart attack three years ago (alive and in prison in his own timeline). Captain Cold is Central City's greatest hero, the Justice League was never established, and even Superman is seemingly nonexistent. Cyborg and Batman have a conference with a group of superheroes to discuss the war between the Amazons and Atlanteans. Barry drives to the Batcave, where Batman attacks him. Batman is revealed to be Thomas Wayne—in this timeline, Bruce Wayne was killed instead of his parents. Thomas beat the robber to death for murdering Bruce, while Martha Wayne went insane at the loss of her son, becoming the Joker.

At Wayne Manor, Barry tries to explain to Thomas about his secret identity as the Flash and his relationship to Bruce Wayne. Barry's memory begins to spontaneously realign itself to the altered timeline and Barry realizes that the world of Flashpoint is not a parallel dimension, but an altered timeline. Barry's ring ejects Eobard Thawne's costume and causes Barry to believe that Thawne is responsible for changing history. Barry decides to recreate the accident that gave him his powers in a bid to undo the damage caused by Thawne, but his initial attempt fails and leaves him badly burned.

A second attempt at recreating Barry's accident restores his powers and health. He concludes that the Reverse-Flash changed history to prevent the formation of the Justice League. He also learns that Kal-El was taken by Project: Superman. Flash, Batman and Cyborg join the cause to stop Wonder Woman and Aquaman. After being rescued, Kal-El flies off in seeming fright in the midst of a battle with the guards, leaving the three in the sewers to be rescued by Element Woman. Flash's memories continue to change.

The president announces Cyborg's failure to unite the world's superheroes and the U.S. enters into the Atlantean-Amazon war. Flash, Batman, Cyborg, and Element Woman ask for the Marvel Family's help and Batman asks Billy Batson to use his lightning to prevent Flash's memories from changing further. Flash tells Batman that if he fails to stop Thawne, the world will destroy itself. Despite reservations, Batman joins Flash as the group heads off to New Themyscira. Enchantress joins them en route. Wonder Woman and Aquaman are fighting one-on-one until Flash and his team arrive. The Marvel Family transforms into Captain Thunder, but is stopped by Enchantress, who uses her magic to restore the Marvel Family to their mortal forms. Penthesilea kills Billy, causing an explosion that cripples the opposing forces.

Thawne reveals that Flash himself created the Flashpoint timeline by traveling back in time to stop him from killing Barry's mother. According to Thawne, these actions transformed him into a living paradox, no longer requiring Barry to exist and allowing him to kill the Flash without erasing his own existence. Thawne continues to taunt Barry with this knowledge until Batman kills him. As the fight continues, Superman arrives and begins to aid the heroes. Thomas insists that Barry put history back to normal to undo the millions of deaths. Now knowing the point of divergence, the Flash restores the timeline.

Traveling back in time, Barry merges with his earlier self during the attempt to stop Thawne. While traveling through time, Barry realizes he can see three different timelines — DC (New Earth), Vertigo (Earth-13), and WildStorm (Earth-50). A mysterious hooded figure tells him that the world was split into three to weaken them for an impending threat, and must now be reunited to combat it. The DC, Vertigo, and Wildstorm universes are then merged. Barry then wakes up in a similar manner to the beginning of Flashpoint, retaining all his memories from the alternate timeline. Barry gives a letter from the alternate Thomas Wayne to Bruce, who is still Batman in this timeline.

== Alternate versions ==
=== Tales from the Dark Multiverse ===
In Tales from the Dark Multiverse, Barry Allen attempts to restore his powers in order to undo the Flashpoint timeline, he dies in the process and Eobard Thawne – the Reverse Flash – takes his place and begins to reshape the world as he desires. After he blackmails the President to grant him authority by killing Aquaman to end the war, Thawne is nearly defeated by 'Superman', only for Superman to be killed by Batman so that Thawne may someday bring Bruce back to life. When Wonder Woman reappears with the New Gods of Apokolips as her gods, Thawne runs back in time to save the Waynes as a deal with Thomas, and then turns his attention to trying to reconstruct reality to make himself the hero.

== Publication ==
=== Titles ===
Flashpoint teaser

- Prelude
  - The Flash (vol. 3) #8–12
- Flashpoint main series
  - Flashpoint #1–5
- Crossover
  - Booster Gold (vol. 2) #44–47
- Mini-series: Several tie-in mini-series were announced via DC's "The Source" Blog and the creative teams were announced in March 2011.
  - Batman-centric: Whatever Happened to Gotham City?
    - Flashpoint: Batman Knight of Vengeance #1–3, written by Brian Azzarello and drawn by Eduardo Risso.
    - Flashpoint: Deadman and the Flying Graysons #1–3, written by JT Krul and drawn by Mike Janin with covers by Cliff Chiang.
  - Villains: Whatever Happened to the World's Greatest Super Villains?
    - Flashpoint: Citizen Cold #1–3, written and drawn by Scott Kolins.
    - Flashpoint: Deathstroke & the Curse of the Ravager #1–3, written by Jimmy Palmiotti and drawn by Joe Bennett & John Dell.
    - Flashpoint: The Legion of Doom #1–3 written by Adam Glass and drawn by Rodeny Buchemi & Jose Marzan with cover by Miguel Sepulveda.
    - Flashpoint: The Outsider #1–3, written by James Robinson and drawn by Javi Fernandez with cover by Kevin Nowlan
  - Green Lantern/Superman: Whatever Happened to the Aliens?
    - Flashpoint: Abin Sur – The Green Lantern #1–3, written by Adam Schlagman and drawn by Felipe Massafera.
    - Flashpoint: Project: Superman #1–3, written by Scott Snyder & Lowell Francis and drawn by Gene Ha.
  - Mystic-centric: Whatever Happened to Science & Magic?
    - Flashpoint: Frankenstein & the Creatures of the Unknown #1–3, written by Jeff Lemire and drawn by Ibraim Roberson with covers by Doug Mahnke.
    - Flashpoint: Secret Seven #1–3, written by Peter Milligan and drawn by George Pérez and Scott Koblish
  - Whatever Happened to Europe?
    - Flashpoint: Emperor Aquaman #1–3, written by Tony Bedard and drawn by Ardian Syaf & Vicente Cifuentes.
    - Flashpoint: Wonder Woman and the Furies #1–3, written by Dan Abnett & Andy Lanning and drawn by Scott Clark & David Beaty with covers by Ed Benes.
    - Flashpoint: Lois Lane and the Resistance #1–3, written by Dan Abnett & Andy Lanning and drawn by Eddy Nunez & Sandra Hope.
  - Everything You Know Will Change in a Flash
    - Flashpoint: Kid Flash Lost #1–3, written by Sterling Gates and drawn by Oliver Nome with covers by Francis Manapul.
    - Flashpoint: The World of Flashpoint #1–3, written by Rex Ogle and drawn by Paulo Siqueira with covers by Shane Davis and Brett Booth.
  - He Never Got the Ring
    - Flashpoint: Hal Jordan #1–3, written by Adam Schlagman and drawn by Ben Oliver with covers by Rags Morales.
- One-shots
  - Flashpoint: Grodd of War #1, written by Sean Ryan and drawn by Ug Guara with cover by Francis Manapul
  - Flashpoint: Reverse-Flash #1, written by Scott Kolins and drawn by Joel Gomez with cover by Ardian Syaf and Vicente Cifuentes
  - Flashpoint: Green Arrow Industries #1, written by Pornsak Pichetshote and drawn by Mark Castiello with cover by Viktor Kalvachev
  - Flashpoint: The Canterbury Cricket #1, written by Mike Carlin and drawn by Rags Morales with cover by Rags Morales

=== Collected editions ===
The series is collected into a number of volumes:

Title	Material collected	Published date	ISBN
The Flash Vol. 2: The Road to Flashpoint	The Flash (vol. 3) #8–12	November 2011	978-1401232795
Flashpoint	Flashpoint #1–5	October 2011	978-1401233372
Absolute Flashpoint	Flashpoint #1–5, The Flash (vol. 4) #1	January 2019	978-1401286262
Flashpoint: The World of Flashpoint Featuring The Flash	Grodd of War #1, Kid Flash Lost #1–3, Legion of Doom #1–3, Reverse Flash #1, Citizen Cold #1–3	March 2012	978-1401234089
Flashpoint: The World of Flashpoint Featuring Wonder Woman	Emperor Aquaman #1–3, Outsider #1–3, Lois Lane and the Resistance #1–3, Wonder Woman and the Furies #1–3	March 2012	978-1401234102
Flashpoint: The World of Flashpoint Featuring Superman	World of Flashpoint #1–3, Booster Gold #44–47, The Canterbury Cricket #1, Project Superman #1–3	March 2012	978-1401234348
Flashpoint: The World of Flashpoint Featuring Batman	Batman: Knight of Vengeance #1–3, Deadman and the Flying Graysons #1–3, Deathstroke and the Curse of the Ravager #1–3, Secret Seven #1–3	March 2012	978-1401234058
Flashpoint: The World of Flashpoint Featuring Green Lantern	Hal Jordan #1–3, Abin Sur – The Green Lantern #1–3, Frankenstein and the Creatures of the Unknown #1–3, Green Arrow Industries #1	March 2012	978-1401234065
Flashpoint: The 10th Anniversary Omnibus	Booster Gold (vol. 2) #44-47, Flash (vol. 3) #9-12, Flashpoint #1-5, Flashpoint: Reverse-Flash #1, Flashpoint: Abin Sur the Green Lantern #1-3, Flashpoint: Emperor Aquaman #1-3, Flashpoint: Batman Knight of Vengeance #1-3, Flashpoint: Citizen Cold #1-3, Flashpoint: The World of Flashpoint #1-3, Flashpoint: Deadman and the Flying Graysons #1-3, Flashpoint: Deathstroke and the Curse of the Ravager #1-3, Flashpoint: Lois Lane and the Resistance #1-3, Flashpoint: The Outsider #1-3, Flashpoint: Secret Seven #1-3, Flashpoint: The Canterbury Cricket #1, Flashpoint: Wonder Woman and the Furies #1-3, Flashpoint: Kid Flash Lost #1-3, Flashpoint: Project Superman #1-3, Flashpoint: Frankenstein and the Creatures of the Unknown #1-3, Flashpoint: Green Arrow Industries #1, Flashpoint: Grodd of War #1, Flashpoint: Hal Jordan #1-3, Flashpoint: The Legion of Doom #1-3	April 2021	978-1779509772

== In other media ==
=== Television ===
- Several allusions to Flashpoint are made in The CW's live-action Arrowverse:
  - A loose adaptation of Flashpoint begins in The Flash episode "The Race of His Life". Grief-stricken after Hunter Zolomon/Zoom kills Henry Allen, Barry Allen travels back to 2000 and stops Eobard Thawne/Reverse-Flash from killing Nora, thus radically altering the timeline. As in the comic book story, Barry begins losing his memories as the Flashpoint timeline starts to overwrite the timeline he is familiar with. Thawne tries to convince Barry to release him, so they can fix what he did, but Barry refuses to listen and tries to make things better by helping Wally West stop The Rival. Barry succeeds in stopping the Rival who is killed by Joe West, but not before Wally is critically wounded. Realizing Flashpoint's effects are only going to get worse, Barry releases Thawne, who kills Nora in 2000 and returns Barry to the corrected 2016, but Thawne leaves a taunting hint that things are not exactly the same, evident by Thawne being alive in 2016 rather than being erased from existence in 2015 due to Eddie Thawne's suicide.
    - The episode "Armageddon, Part 4" revealed that Eobard Thawne created a Reverse-Flashpoint where he was Flash and Barry was Reverse-Flash after Thawne went back in time to kill Nora and a younger Barry. Investigating what Despero meant that he would cause Armageddon, Flash goes to the year 2031, where he learns of the changes and his role in the Reverse-Flashpoint; Barry will fade away when the Reverse-Flashpoint becomes permanent by midnight. With help from the Reverse-Flashpoint Darhk, Barry undoes the Reverse-Flashpoint timeline.

=== Film ===
- The 2013 DC Universe Animated Original Movie entitled Justice League: The Flashpoint Paradox closely adapts the Flashpoint comic's story. Similar to the comic launching The New 52, the film served to launch a shared universe of fifteen DC animated films released between 2013 and 2020. Among the differences is the prologue with the Justice League helping the Flash defeat the Rogues, the implication that Eobard Thawne is not Nora Allen's killer, Enchantress not betraying Cyborg's Resistance, and Lex Luthor being a part of Deathstroke's crew of pirates.
  - In Justice League Dark: Apokolips War, John Constantine reads Flash's mind to learn about the "Flashpoint" incident. Following the defeat of Darkseid and Batman stating that Earth lost 31% of its core due to Darkseid's actions, Constantine asks Flash to travel back in time to trigger another Flashpoint and restart the timeline over again so that the current state of things will be erased. Barry replies that he promised his wife Iris not to do it again. Constantine assures him that, though certain changes will not be good, it will still be better than the current timeline. Flash resolves to follow through and runs off into the Speed Force, resetting reality.
- Elements of the Flashpoint storyline are incorporated for the DC Extended Universe film The Flash. Director Andy Muschietti was requested to adapt the storyline, which he recognized as a great story due to employing time travel to include Barry Allen's origin story and Batman, by Warner Bros., though Muschietti personally feels that his film is more suspenseful to make a more emotional experience whereas the original comic was more like Jacob's Ladder. The film is directed by Muschietti, from a screenplay by Christina Hodson, with Ezra Miller reprising their role of The Flash, and Ben Affleck and Michael Keaton reprising their respective roles of Batman. The film was released in theaters on June 16, 2023.

=== Video games ===
- The 2013 video game Injustice: Gods Among Us had Flashpoint-inspired designs of Batman, Aquaman, Wonder Woman, and Deathstroke as downloadable content.
- The 2015 video game Batman: Arkham Knight had Batman's Flashpoint design for Batman as downloadable content.
- The 2017 video game Injustice 2 featured the Flashpoint version of Wonder Woman making a cameo in Green Arrow's alternate ending as a member of the multiverse Justice League.
- The 2011 video game DC Universe Online launched its 40th episode, "World of Flashpoint" in 2021, featuring Queen Wonder Woman, Emperor Aquaman, Batman (Thomas Wayne), and the Flash.
