= Fernando Dagnino Guerra =

Spanish comic book artist (born 1973)

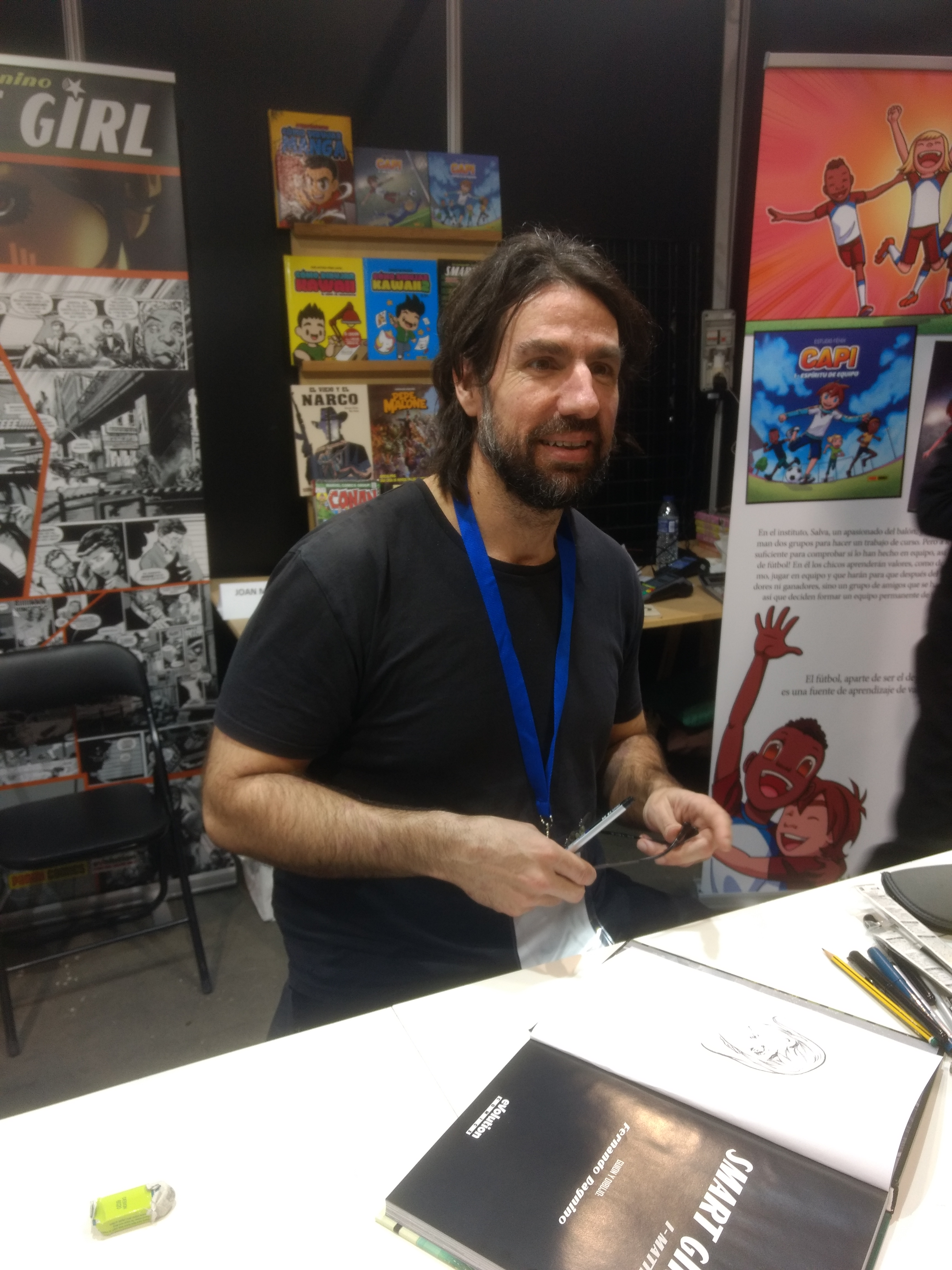
Fernando Dagnino - València 2020

Fernando Dagnino Guerra (born 24 July 1973), known professionally as Fernando Dagnino, is a Spanish comic book artist, writer and penciller born in Madrid, Spain.

== Career ==
Dagnino's artistic career started out during his last years of university (master's degree in English Studies) and led him into three main fields: graphic design, illustration and comic books.

He worked for The Walt Disney Company's Imagineers in the design of an attraction permanently exhibited in Florida. He also combined work as an illustrator for juvenile literature while producing works as a freelancer for publicity agencies, magazines and producers.

In 2008 Dagnino abandoned the advertising industry to start to work for DC Comics exclusively. That same year he published his first children's book (Kasandra y la Rebelión de los niños) which will be part of a series in the future.

Dagnino became the regular penciller of the comic Superman with issue #692.

He also did the art for the Green Lantern Prequel Special: Sinestro #1.

As part of DC Comics' company-wide 2011 title relaunch, The New 52, Dagnino was made the artist on Resurrection Man. He subsequently took over art duties on Suicide Squad, beginning with issue #9, replacing Jesus Saiz, who moved to Resurrection Man.

== Bibliography ==
=== Comics ===
==== DC ====
- Action Comics #886 (along with Pere Pérez) (2010)
- Batman and the Outsiders, vol. 4, 13 (2009)
- Justice League: Generation Lost #3, 6, 9, 12, 19, 21, 23 (2010–11)
- Legion of Super-Heroes, vol. 5, #14 (2011)
- Starman, vol. 2, #81
- Supergirl, vol. 4, #41, 48, Annual #1 (2009–10)
- Superman, #692-693 (2009)
- Teen Titans, vol. 3, #64, 67, Annual #1 (2009)
- Wonder Woman, vol. 3, #41-43 (among other artists) (2010)

==== Other publishers ====
- Tales of the Black Spain #1-3 (Factoría de Ideas)

=== Children Books ===
- Kasandra y la Rebelión de los niños (Editorial Puerto Norte-Sur, 2008, ISBN 84-934369-7-6)
