= Aaron Lopresti =

American comic book artist (born 1964)

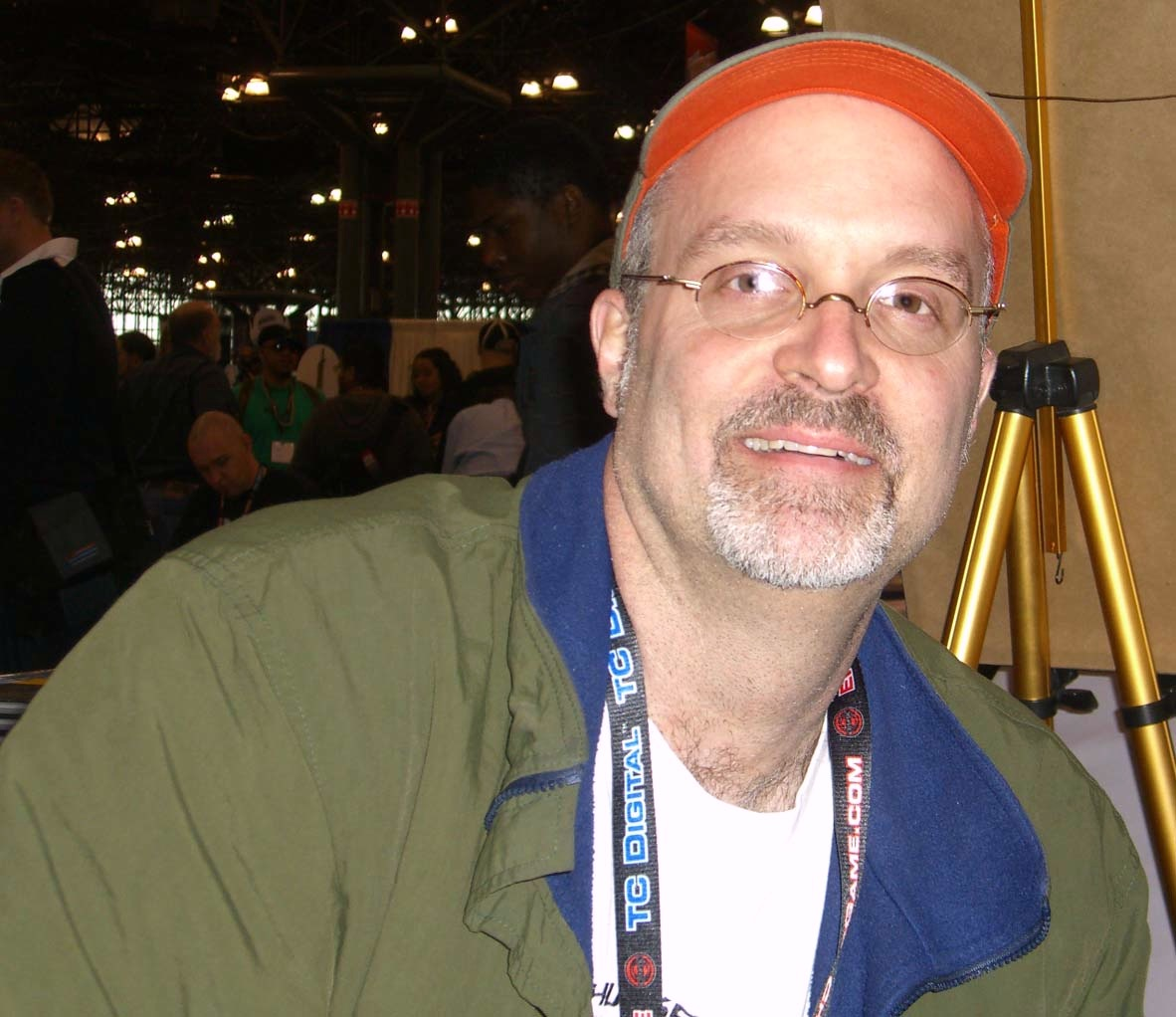
- Lopresti in 2008
- Born: Aaron Allen Lopresti; January 7, 1964 (age 62)
- Areas: Writer, Penciller, Inker
- Notable works: Captain Marvel; Excalibur; Planet Hulk; Ms. Marvel; Wonder Woman

Aaron Lopresti (born January 7, 1964) is an American comic book artist who has worked for Marvel Comics, DC Comics, Dark Horse Comics, CrossGen Comics and Image Comics.

== Early life ==
Aaron Lopresti was born January 7, 1964 in Portland, Oregon. After studying business for a year at Oregon State University, Lopresti left to pursue his passion for film. After two years of community college, went to study at USC School of Cinematic Arts in Los Angeles.

== Career ==
Lopresti's first published work of note was the Malibu Comics title Sludge, in 1993. He has since gone on to illustrate such titles as Marvel's X-Men, Captain Marvel, Planet Hulk and Ms. Marvel and was the artist for DC's Wonder Woman for issues #20-23, 26–30, 32–40, switching shifts with artist Bernard Chang. He drew covers for both Adventure Comics and Superman: Last Stand of New Krypton, as well as interior art for Justice League: Generation Lost. Lopresti was amongst the new creative talent running DC Comics' The New 52 relaunch in 2011, becoming the penciller of the new Justice League International series, working with writer Dan Jurgens. In June 2012 it was announced that Lopresti and writer Christy Marx will be producing a revival of Amethyst, Princess of Gemworld in the Sword of Sorcery title.

Since that time, Lopresti has written and illustrated the serialized Garbage Man series for DC Comics which appeared in the anthology miniseries Weird Worlds and My Greatest Adventure and dealt with the adventures of a young corporate lawyer turned toxic muck monster who, according to Lopresti, was created because "the DCU needed a monster/hero character to replace Swamp Thing which at the time was being held captive by Vertigo". That project was followed by work on Detective Comics and Legends of the Dark Knight. In 2015–2016, Lopresti wrote and illustrated his first creator-owned project, Power Cubed, published by Dark Horse Comics and wrote and illustrated the revamped Metamorpho series for DC Comics.

=== Influences ===
Comics artists that Lopresti has named as influences include Berni Wrightson, Neal Adams, Michael Golden, Jim Steranko, Brian Bolland. Illustrators who have influenced him include Frank Frazetta, James Bama, William Stout, JC Leyendecker, Brian Froud, Robert McGinnis and Chuck Jones.

Other contemporary artists Lopresti has named as his favorites include Adam Hughes, Travis Charest, Mark Schultz, Mike Ploog, Peter de Sève, Walt Simonson, Alan Davis, Barry Windsor-Smith, Chris Ayers, Claire Wendling, Dave Johnson, Rudy Nebres and Alex Niño.

== Personal life ==
Lopresti and his wife Shelley have two children, Josh and Samantha.

== Bibliography ==
=== Empire Comics ===
- Wraith of God (2022), artist and writer
- Wraith of God: Bloodhunters (2023), artist and writer
- Kit Carter: Planet Doom (2024), artist and writer

=== DC ===
- Aquaman vol. 8 #56 (with writer Kyle Higgins, 2020)
- Catwoman vol. 4 #25 (with writer John Layman, 2013)
- Convergence #7 (with writers Jeff King and Scott Lobdell, 2015)
- Countdown to Final Crisis #12 ("Origin of Circe" backup story, with writer Scott Beatty, 2008)
- Damage vol. 2 #9-16, Annual #1 (with writer Robert Venditti, 2018–2019)
- Death of Hawkman #1-6 (with writer Marc Andreyko, 2016–2017)
- Detective Comics vol. 2 #26, 28-29 (with writer John Layman, 2014)
- Earth 2 #15.2 (Solomon Grundy, with writer Matt Kindt, 2013)
- Elseworlds 80-Page Giant #1 one-shot (among other artists, 1999)
- Future Quest Presents #9-11 (The Herculoids, with writer Rob Williams, 2018)
- Green Lantern 80-Page Giant #3 (among other artists, 2000)
- Guy Gardner: Warrior #40 (with writer Beau Smith, 1996)
- Harley Quinn vol. 3 #67 (among other artists, 2020)
- JSA Returns: National Comics #1 (with writer Mark Waid, 1999)
- Justice League vol. 4 #41-42, 48–50, Annual #2 (with writers Robert Venditti and Si Spurrier, 2020)
- Justice League: Generation Lost #1, 5, 8, 11, 14, 18, 24 (with writer Judd Winick, 2010–2011)
- Justice League International vol. 3 #1-5, 7-12 (with writer Dan Jurgens, 2011–2012)
- Legends of Tomorrow #1-6 (Metamorpho, writer/artist, 2016)
- Legion of Superheroes vol. 4 #41 (with writer Jim Shooter, 2008)
- Martian Manhunter/Marvin the Martian Special #1 (with writers Steve Orlando and Frank Barbiere, 2017)
- My Greatest Adventure vol. 2 #1-6 (Garbage Man, writer/artist, 2011–2012)
- The New 52: Futures End #4, 7, 10, 14, 20, 23, 27, 33, 37 (with writers Brian Azzarello, Jeff Lemire, Dan Jurgens, and Keith Giffen, 2014–2015)
- Plastic Man Special #1 (with writer Ty Templeton, 1999)
- Robin Vol. 2 #23-24 (with writer Chuck Dixon, 1995, 1996)
- Superboy vol. 4 #66-67 (with writer Karl Kesel, 1999)
- Superboy and the Ravers #11-12 (with writers Karl Kesel and Steve Mattsson, 1997)
- Sword of Sorcery vol. 2 #0-3, 5-8 (Amethyst, Princess of Gemworld, with writer Christy Marx, 2012–2013)
- Takion #1-7 (with writer Paul Kupperberg, 1996)
- Tales from the Dark Multiverse: Infinite Crisis #1 (with writer James Tynion IV, 2020)
- Weird Worlds vol. 2 #1-6 (Garbage Man, writer/artist, 2011)
- Wonder Woman vol. 3, #20-23, 26–30, 32–36, 38-40 (with writer Gail Simone, 2008–10)
- Wonder Woman vol. 5 #73 (with writer Steve Orlando, 2019)
- Wonder Woman/Conan #1-6 (with writer Gail Simone, 2017–2018)

=== Marvel ===
- The Amazing Spider-Man, #365, 368, 370–372, 375 (backup stories, with writers Al Milgrom, J. M. DeMatteis, and David Michelinie, 2009)
- Amazing Spider-Man Annual, #26-27 (backup stories, with writers Mike Lackey and David Michelinie, 2009)
- Captain Marvel vol. 3 #19-22 (With writer Peter David, 2004)
- Civil War: X-Men miniseries, #3 (2006)
- Darkhawk Annual #2 (1993)
- New Excalibur #2-14 (With writer Chris Claremont, 2004–05)
- Generation X #46-47 (1998–99)
- Hulk Giant-Size #1 (among other artists) (2006)
- Impossible Man Summer Vacation Spectacular #1 (1990)
- Incredible Hulk vol. 2, #96-99, 102-103 (With writer Greg Pak, 2006–07)
- Marvel Comics Presents (Spider-Man) #39 (1990)
- Ms. Marvel vol. 2 #13-24 (With writer Brian Reed, 2007–2008)
- Namor, the Sub-Mariner #51 (1994)
- New X-Men #16-19 (With writers Nunzio DeFilippis and Christina Weir, 2005)
- Uncanny X-Men #403, 406 (With writer Joe Casey, 2002)

=== Other publishers ===
- Atomic Toybox #1 (Image, 1999)
- Countdown #1-6 (With writer Jeff Mariotte, 2000)
- Lady Death: A Medieval Tale #11-12 (CrossGen, 2004)
- Marriage of Hercules and Xena #1 (Topps, 1998)
- Mystic #31-34, 36–39, 41-43 (With writer Tony Bedard, CrossGen, 2003–04)
