= Rocket Red Brigade =

DC Comics superhero team

- Rocket Red Brigade, artist Ivan Reis.

Publication information
- Publisher: DC Comics
- First appearance: Green Lantern Corps #208 (January 1987)
- Created by: Steve Englehart (writer); Joe Staton (artist)

In-story information
- Base(s): Russian Federation
- Member(s): Assorted Rocket Reds; Rocket Red #1; Rocket Red #4; Rocket Red #7

The Rocket Red Brigade (Russian: Ракетная Красная Бригада, romanized: Raketnaya Krasnaya Brigada) is a DC Comics superhero team. They first appeared in Green Lantern Corps #208 (January 1987), and were created by Steve Englehart and Joe Staton.

== History ==
Originally created for the Soviet Union by Green Lantern Kilowog, the Rocket Red Brigade — normal human beings enhanced using "forced evolution" and armoured battle-suits — proudly defended the USSR.

Their abilities included super strength, invulnerability, flight (through rocket packs/boots), the ability to project powerful energy blasts and "mecha-empathy" — the ability to sense and control computers and machines.

=== Rocket Red #1 ===
==== Josef Denisovich ====
Decorated Russian soldier Josef Denisovich was a close friend of the alien Green Lantern Kilowog. He was also the first member of the Rocket Red Brigade. Denisovich was turned against Kilowog by the Soviet government and died fighting him.

==== Maks Chazov ====
In Checkmate #22, it is revealed that Checkmate has since recruited the current Rocket Red #1, Maks Chazov, as its White Queen's Knight, with the apparent consent of Chazov's superiors.

=== Rocket Red #7 ===
Vladimir Mikoyan was the first Rocket Red admitted into Justice League International. During the Millennium event, Mikoyan was discovered to be an undercover Manhunter android and destroyed by Booster Gold and the Justice League.

=== Pozhar ===
Mikhail Arkadin, the Russian hero also known as Pozhar, wore a modified suit of Rocket Red armor while serving as a member of the Red Shadows.

=== Russian Mafia ===
After the Soviet Union collapsed, the other Rocket Reds fell on hard times. Several were brainwashed to serve as agents of the super-criminal Sonar. Many of the suits ended up on the black market. Some of the Rocket Reds began working for the Russian mafia to support themselves.

=== Rockets fly again ===
Surviving members of the Rocket Red Brigade took their armor back from the Russian Army to fight the world prison break during the events of Villains United. They also appeared protecting Russia's border in 52, wearing new, more advanced suits of armor. They were seen again in One Year Later protecting Russia while hindering Green Lantern Hal Jordan's attempt to apprehend an interstellar criminal in Green Lantern #10. After the ensuing situation was resolved, the current Rocket Red #1 is promoted as a possible Justice League member in the future, should the League plan to expand.

In Justice League of America #45, the League meets the German Rakete-Auslese, or "Rocket Elite", who Batman notes are the German equivalent of the Rocket Reds, and use some of the same technology in their flying battlesuits.

During Mon-El's tour of the earth, he visits Moscow and helps the Rocket Reds during a battle with Georgian terrorists. Afterwards, a female Rocket Red pilot named Ivana takes Mon-El on a tour of Saint Basil's Cathedral and gives him the first kiss he's ever received from a human.

The Rocket Red Brigade appears in Justice League: Generation Lost #4. One of their former number who had served under the USSR, Gavril Ivanovich, joins the members of the former Justice League International in tracking down Maxwell Lord. In The New 52 continuity reboot, Ivanovich joins the Justice League as a representative of Russia.

== In other media ==
=== Television ===
- An unidentified Rocket Red resembling Dmitri Pushkin makes non-speaking cameo appearances in Justice League Unlimited as a member of the Justice League.
- The Dmitri Pushkin incarnation of Rocket Red appears in the Batman: The Brave and the Bold episode "Crisis: 22,300 Miles Above Earth!" as a member of Justice League International.
- The Rocket Red Brigade appears in the Young Justice episode "Leverage". This version of the group was created by the Russian government to serve as their equivalent to the Justice League, is led by Commander Olga Illyich / Rocket Red No. 1 (voiced by Stephanie Lemelin), and also consists of new member Dmitri Pushkin / Rocket Red No. 4 (voiced by Steve Blum).

=== Miscellaneous ===
The Rocket Red Brigade appears in Smallville Season 11.

=== Merchandise ===
- Rocket Red received an action figure in Mattel's Justice League Unlimited DC Superheroes toy line.
- Rocket Red received an action figure in Mattel's Signature Series, available through Mattel's online outlet at MattyCollector.com.

== See also ==
- List of Russian superheroes
