= Kevin Maguire (artist) =

American comics artist

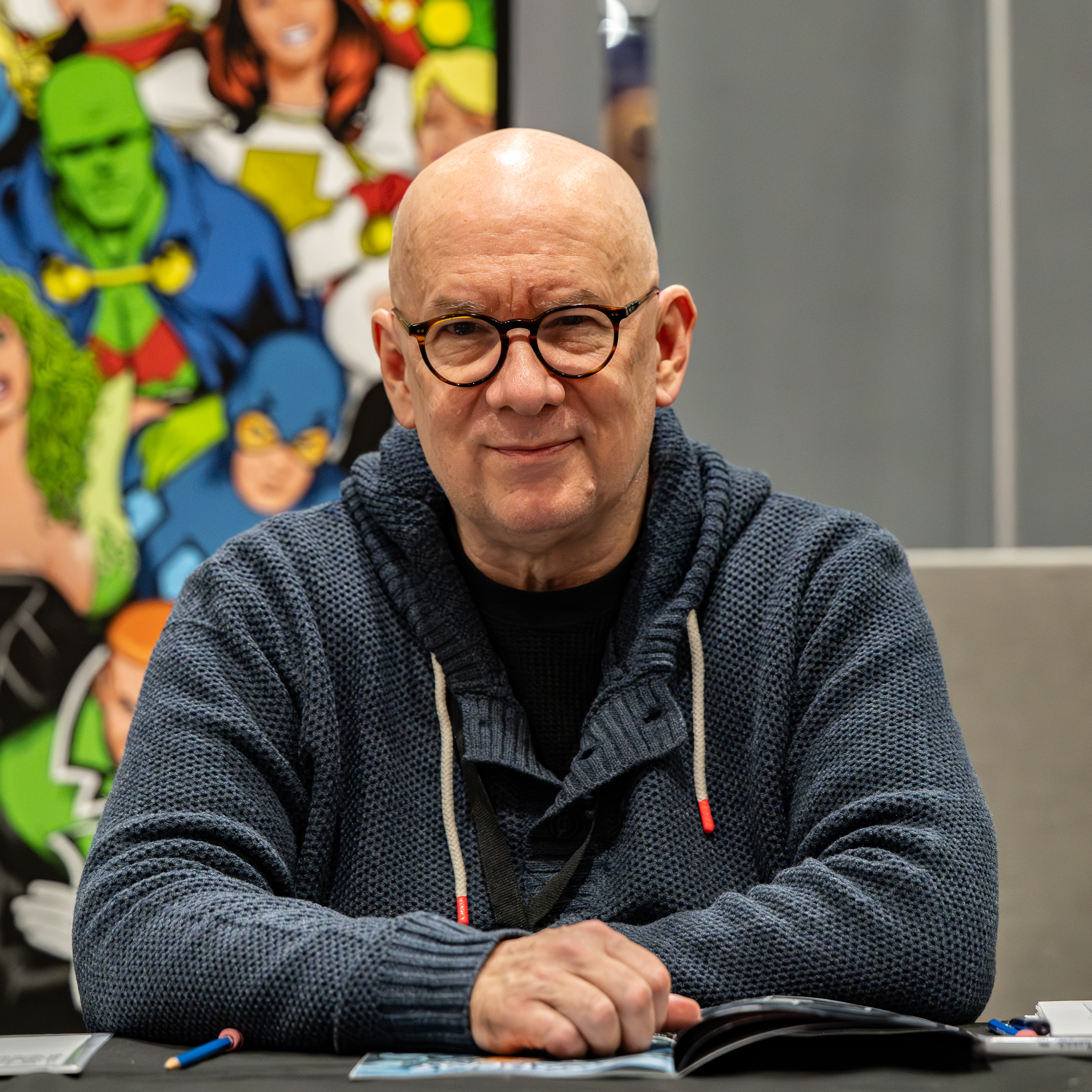
- Maguire at MCM Comic Con London, 24 October 2025
- Born: September 9, 1960 (age 66) Kearny, New Jersey, U.S.
- Areas: Writer, Penciller, Inker
- Notable works: Justice League; The Defenders
- Awards: Russ Manning Best Newcomer Award (1988)

Kevin Maguire (born September 9, 1960) is an American comics artist, known for his work on series such as Justice League, Batman Confidential, Captain America, and X-Men.

== Career ==
Maguire's first credited published comics work was The Official Handbook of the Marvel Universe vol. 2 #6 (May 1986). He debuted at DC Comics with artwork in Who's Who: The Definitive Directory of the DC Universe #23 (Jan. 1987) and #25 (March 1987).

In 1987, Maguire was the artist on the relaunch of Justice League written by Keith Giffen and J. M. DeMatteis. Maguire left the series with issue #24 (February 1989) but returned for Giffen and DeMatteis' final story in #60 (March 1992). The two writers and Maguire reunited in 2003 for the Formerly Known as the Justice League miniseries and its 2005 sequel, I Can't Believe It's Not the Justice League published in JLA Classified. Maguire's other collaborations with Giffen and DeMatteis include The Defenders at Marvel in 2005, a DC Retroactive: Justice League - The '90s one-shot in 2011, and a series of Metal Men back-up stories in the 2009 revival of the Doom Patrol.

Maguire was one of the artists who launched the Team Titans series in 1992. He has frequently collaborated with writer Fabian Nicieza on series such as Adventures of Captain America, X-Men Forever, and Batman Confidential.

Maguire and George Pérez alternated as artists of the New 52 revival of the Worlds' Finest series, written by Paul Levitz. He departed the series with #12. Maguire was to have reunited with Giffen and DeMatteis on the 2013 Justice League 3000 series, but was removed from the project by DC. He moved to Marvel for a short time, working on various projects with Brian Michael Bendis, but would return to DC in 2018 joining writer Marc Andreyko as the artist on Supergirl vol. 7 as of issue #21 (Oct. 2018).

== Critical reception ==
In 2015, comedian and late night talk show host Seth Meyers named Maguire as his favorite comic book artist. Meyers previously collaborated with Maguire and Bill Hader on the 2008 Spider-Man one-shot comic Spider-Man: The Short Halloween.

Writer Marc Andreyko praised Maguire stating "Basically, the right artist for any project is Kevin Maguire. He's an absolute genius, an underappreciated genius." and "He has some of the best grasp of facial expressions and character acting of almost any artist working in the business."

== Bibliography ==
=== Interior art ===
==== Acclaim Comics ====
- Trinity Angels #1–12 (1997–1998) - script: #1-12, script/art: #1-5, 12

==== DC Comics ====
- Batman Confidential #17–21 (2008)
- DC Retroactive: JLA - The '90s #1 (2011)
- DCU Holiday Special #1 (among other artists) (2009)
- Doom Patrol vol. 5 (Metal Men) #1–4, 6–7 (2009–2010)
- Fairest in All the Land HC (2014)
- Formerly Known as the Justice League, miniseries (Super Buddies) #1–6 (2003–2004)
- Gen13 #42 (1999)
- Hawk and Dove vol. 3 #20, 25 (1991)
- Injustice: Gods Among Us (digital comic) #19 (2013)
- JLA 80-Page Giant #1 (1998)
- JLA: Created Equal miniseries #1–2 (2000)
- JLA Classified #4–9 (2005)
- Justice League #40 (among other artists) (2015)
- Justice League International #1–12, 16–19, 22–24, 60, Annual #5 (1987–1992)
- Just Imagine Stan Lee creating The Flash (2002)
- Legion of Super-Heroes #23 (2013)
- My Greatest Adventure, miniseries, ("Tanga" feature) #1–6 (2011–2012)
- New Titans #86 (among other artists) (1992)
- Secret Origins (Deadman) #15; (Teen Titans) Annual #3 (1987–1989)
- Silver Age: The Brave and The Bold (Batman and Metal Men) #1 (2000)
- Supergirl vol. 7 #21–23, 26, 30–31 (2018–2019)
- Superman vol. 2 #177 (with Ed McGuinness) (2002)
- Superman/Batman #27 (2006)
- Team Titans #1–3 (1992)
- Weird Worlds, miniseries ("Tanga" feature), #1–4 (2011)
- Worlds' Finest, #0, 1–4, 6–7, 10, 12 (with George Pérez) (2012–2013)

==== Image Comics ====
- Strikeback! #1–5 (Also writer. Reprint of Malibu/Bravura #1–3, with new issues #4 and #5 completing the story) (1996)
- Velocity: Pilot Season #1 (2007)
- WildC.A.T.s #22 (1995)
- Wildstorm Rising #2 (1995)

==== Malibu Comics ====
- Strikeback!, miniseries, #1–3 (Also writer. 1994, under "Bravura" imprint)

==== Marvel Comics ====
- The Avengers Annual #18 (among other artists) (1989)
- Adventures of Captain America miniseries #1–4 (1991)
- Captain America vol. 3 #50 (2002)
- The Defenders miniseries #1–5 (2005–2006)
- Fantastic Four Annual 2001
- Guardians of the Galaxy vol. 3 #10 (2013), vol. 4 #14 (2016)
- The Incredible Hulk Annual #18 (1992)
- Spider-Man Holiday Special (1995)
- Spider-Man: The Short Halloween #1 (2009)
- X-Men Forever miniseries #1–6 (2001)
- X-Men Unlimited #35 (2002)

=== Covers only ===
==== Atomeka Press ====
- Hero Squared X-tra Sized Special #1 (2005)

==== Black Bull Entertainment ====
- Shadow Reavers #1 (2001)

==== Dark Horse Comics ====
- Godzilla #5–8 (1995–1996)
- The Mask: World Tour #1–4 (1995–1996)

==== DC Comics ====
- Action Comics #864–865 (2008)
- Adventures of the Outsiders #43 (1987)
- Ambush Bug: Year None #5 (2009)
- Aquaman #1–7 (1991–1992)
- Aquaman: Sword of Atlantis #55, 57 (2007)
- Booster Gold vol. 2 #32–36 (2010)
- Darkstars #13 (1993)
- Deathstroke the Terminator #29 (1993)
- Demolition Man #1–4 (1993–1994)
- Fanboy #3 (1999)
- Green Lantern vol. 3 #18 (1991)
- Hawk and Dove Annual #2 (1991)
- Justice League America #26–30, 59, Annual #4 (1989–1992)
- Justice League: A Midsummer's Nightmare #1–3 (1996)
- Justice League Europe #11, 36, Annual #2 (1990–1992)
- Justice League: Generation Lost #1–6, 9, 11–22, 24 (2010–2011)
- Justice League International #25 (1989)
- Justice League of America #7 (2007)
- Justice League Quarterly #4–5 (1991)
- L.E.G.I.O.N. #1–18, 32–39, 43 (1989–1992)
- The Legion #36 (2004)
- Robin II #1–4 (1991)
- Secret Origins vol. 2 #20, 48 (1987–1990)
- Showcase '93 #2 (1993)
- Starman #38–39 (1991)
- Superboy: The Comic Book #2–12, 14–22, Special #1 (1990–1992)
- Suicide Squad #38 (1990)
- Tales of the Legion of Super-Heroes #346 (1987)
- Tales of the Teen Titans #79 (1987)
- Titans Sell-Out Special (1992)
- Valor #16 (1994)

==== IDW Publishing ====
- Star Trek: Mission's End #1 (2009)

==== Malibu Comics ====
- Man of War #6 (1993)
- The Solution #6–8 (1994)
- Warstrike #5 (1994)

==== Marvel Comics ====
- The Amazing Spider-Man #573 (2008)
- Double Dragon #6 (1991)
- Gambit #13-15 (2000)
- Marvel Comics Presents #25 (1989)
- Marvel Super-Heroes vol. 2 #14 (1993)
- The Original Ghost Rider #5 (1992)
- Power Man and Iron Fist #123 (1986)
- The Sensational She-Hulk #23 (1991)
- X-Factor #200 (2010)
- X-Men: Phoenix #2 (2000)

== Awards ==
- 1988 Russ Manning Best Newcomer Award
- 2004 Eisner Award for Best Humor Publication for Formerly Known as the Justice League, with Keith Giffen, J. M. DeMatteis, and Josef Rubinstein

=== Nominations ===
- 1988 Eisner Award for "Best Art Team" for Justice League International #1, with Al Gordon

Preceded by n/a	Justice League artist 1987–1989	Succeeded by Ty Templeton and Mike McKone
Preceded by Eric Shanower	"Russ Manning Most Promising Newcomer"; Eisner Award recipient 1988	Succeeded by Richard Piers Rayner
Preceded by n/a	Worlds' Finest artist (with George Pérez); 2012–2013	Succeeded by Robson Rocha
