= Justice League International =

DC Comics superhero team

- Cover of Justice League #1 (May 1987) by Kevin Maguire and Terry Austin.

Group publication information
- Publisher: DC Comics
- First appearance: Justice League #1 (May 1987)
- Created by: Keith Giffen; J. M. DeMatteis

In-story information
- Type of organization: Team

Roster
- See: List of Justice League members

Justice League International

Series publication information
- Schedule: Monthly
- Format: Ongoing series
- Genre: Superhero
- Publication date: List: Justice League May – October 1987 (#1-6) Justice League International (1987 series) November 1987 – April 1989 (#7-25) Justice League America May 1989 – August 1996 (#26-113) Justice League International (1993 series) June 1993 – September 1994 Justice League International (2011 series) September 2011 – August 2012
- Number of issues: List: Justice League: 6 Justice League International (1987 series): 19 (#7–25) Justice League America: 94 (#26–113) Justice League International (1993 series): 17 Justice League International (2011 series): 12, plus 1 Annual

Creative team
- Writer(s): List: (1987 series / JL America) Keith Giffen J. M. DeMatteis Dan Jurgens Dan Vado Gerard Jones (1995 series) Gerard Jones (New 52, 2011 series) Dan Jurgens
- Penciller(s): List: (1987 series / JL America) Kevin Maguire Ty Templeton Adam Hughes Linda Medley Chris Wozniak Dan Jurgens Kevin West Marc Campos Chuck Wojtkiewicz (1995 series) Ron Randall Chuck Wojtkiewicz (2011 series) Aaron Lopresti Dan Jurgens Marco Castiello
- Inker(s): List: (1987 series) / JL America) Al Gordon Joe Rubinstein Art Nichols Rick Burchett Bob Smith (1995 series) Roy Richardson (2011 series) Matt Ryan Vincenzo Acunzo
- Colorist(s): List: (1987 series / JL America) Gene D'Angelo (2011 series) Hi-Fi
- Creator(s): Keith Giffen; J. M. DeMatteis

Collected editions
- Volume 1: ISBN 1-4012-1666-8
- Volume 2: ISBN 1-4012-1826-1
- Volume 3: ISBN 1-4012-1941-1
- Volume 4: ISBN 1-4012-2196-3

Justice League International (JLI) is a superhero team appearing in American comic books published by DC Comics that succeeded the original Justice League from the late 1980s to the early 2000s. The team enjoyed several comic book runs, the first being written by Keith Giffen and J. M. DeMatteis, with art by Kevin Maguire, created in 1987. Due to editorial conflicts, the team's new makeup was based largely on newer characters, such as Booster Gold, and recent acquisitions from other comic book companies, such as Blue Beetle.

In 2010 and 2011, the team experienced a resurgence as part of the Blackest Night and New 52 comic runs.

== Publication history ==
Following the events of the company-wide crossovers Crisis on Infinite Earths and Legends, Justice League of America writer J. M. DeMatteis was paired with writer Keith Giffen and artist Kevin Maguire on a new Justice League series. However, at the time, most of the core Justice League characters were unavailable. Superman was limited to John Byrne's reboot, George Pérez was relaunching Wonder Woman and Mike Baron was launching the Wally West version of the Flash.

As a result, the initial team consisted of:

- Batman: Series editor Dennis O'Neil, taking pity on the new creative team, allowed Batman to be used in the series.
- Black Canary: Dinah Lance was written as a strong feminist and often clashed with chauvinist Guy Gardner.
- Blue Beetle: A recent acquisition from Charlton Comics.
- Captain Marvel: No longer a separate personality from his civilian self Billy Batson, this version focuses on his alter ego's naiveté.
- Doctor Fate: The inclusion of Doctor Fate was followed by a miniseries written by DeMatteis and Giffen.
- Doctor Light: First appearing in Crisis on Infinite Earths, Kimiyo Hoshi briefly joins the League.
- Guy Gardner: Editor Andy Helfer suggested using Guy Gardner over the more well-known Hal Jordan.
- Martian Manhunter: The only connection to the previous iteration of the Justice League.
- Mister Miracle: The world's greatest escape artist. His wife, Big Barda, and friend, Oberon, are also associated with the League.

The resulting comedic tone was Giffen's idea, introducing new characterizations to old characters: Guy Gardner was now a loutish hothead, Booster Gold was greedier and more inept than he had been in Dan Jurgens' series and Captain Marvel displayed a childlike personality.

When Black Canary resigns, Green Flame and Ice Maiden (both from the Global Guardians) join. They eventually change their names to Fire and Ice and become long standing members within the team.

The series was nominated as "Best New Series" in 1988 by the Harvey Awards, but lost to Paul Chadwick's Concrete. It also featured Adam Hughes' first work for a major comic book publisher.

They fight the Champions of Angor, other-dimensional superheroes intent on destroying all nuclear weapons. Rumaan Harjavti, the dictator of Bialya, takes advantage of the Champions to eliminate his rivals. In Russia, the League fights the Rocket Red Brigade, until Mikhail Gorbachev allows them to help. Wandjina sacrifices himself to stop a nuclear meltdown and the League are sent home by international law. Millionaire entrepreneur Maxwell Lord takes an interest in the team, breaching their security and suggesting Booster Gold as a new member.

Booster proves himself in combat against the Royal Flush Gang and Lord declares himself their press liaison. Martian Manhunter saves the world when they battle against a conscious psychic plague and he consumes it. Gardner challenges Batman to a fight over leadership, but Batman knocks him out in one punch. Doctor Fate is captured by the Gray Man, a rogue servant to the Lords of Order. Teaming up with the Creeper, they release Fate and stop the Gray Man from taking over the world.

Earth is attacked by a mysterious satellite and the League travels into space. Miracle recognizes it as a modified device from New Genesis and neutralizes it. They return home as heroes. Maxwell Lord introduces a proposal to get United Nations funding and they are given sponsorship in exchange for government regulation. This plan allows them to act as an independent city-state with worldwide embassies. Captain Atom and Rocket Red #7 are added to the team by the United States and Russia, respectively. Captain Marvel and Doctor Fate quit the team for personal reasons; Batman steps down as leader, appointing Martian Manhunter to replace him. They are reintroduced to the world as Justice League International. Despite a series of embarrassing accidents, they successfully move in to embassies around the world. This includes Moscow, New York City, and Paris.

With issue #7, the series was renamed Justice League International to reflect the team's new international status. The name change spawned the term "JLI", which is used when referring to this period in Justice League history. The series was again renamed following the launch of Justice League Europe in 1989. The series was known as Justice League America until its cancellation in 1996.

=== "Justice League: Breakdowns" ===
"Breakdowns" was a 16-issue crossover between the Justice League America (#53–60) and Justice League Europe (#29–36) titles, changing the tone of both series from a humorous one to a more serious one. After it, the creative teams of both series changed. The major events that occurred were the following:

- Maxwell Lord is initially in a coma from a failed assassination attempt. He is later possessed by JLE foe Dreamslayer of the Extremists. Lord loses his powers following the events of "Breakdowns".
- Queen Bee, ruler of the country Bialya, is killed in a coup d'état led by Sumaan Harjavti, the twin brother of Rumaan Harjavti.
- Despero awakens and escapes Manga Khan's starship to wreak havoc on New York City, seeking vengeance against the Justice League. A force of the Justice League's best (Martian Manhunter, Power Girl, Fire, Rocket Red, Metamorpho, the Flash, Guy Gardner, Major Disaster), along with the Conglomerate (led by Booster Gold) and Lobo, were unable to stop him. Kilowog and L-Ron subdue Despero by transferring L-Ron's consciousness into Despero's body.
- While possessing Maxwell Lord, Dreamslayer kidnaps and later murders Mitch Wacky on the island of Kooey Kooey Kooey, where Blue Beetle and Booster Gold previously attempted to open a resort called "Club JLI". Using Lord's persona, Dreamslayer lures a large portion of the Justice League to the island and takes control of them, making them the "new Extremists".
- The Silver Sorceress, one of the former Champions of Angor and a Justice League member, dies defeating Dreamslayer and is buried on Kooey Kooey Kooey.
- The United Nations withdraws its support from the Justice League and it disbands. Martian Manhunter seemingly takes a leave of absence, although he later re-emerges under the persona of Bloodwynd.

=== Expansion ===
The Justice League gets a larger roster as seen in Justice League International #24 (February 1989), cover art by Kevin Maguire and Josef Rubinstein.

Justice League International was renamed Justice League America. The franchise expanded from the early to mid-1990s by adding severall Spin offs. These included: Justice League Europe, Justice League Task Force, Extreme Justice and Justice League Quarterly. Justice League Europe was later retitled to become the second volume of Justice League International.

In the latter part of the series, more recognizable characters, including Superman, Wonder Woman, Green Lantern and Aquaman, joined, followed by lesser known characters such as Bloodwynd, Maya, Maxima, Nuklon, Obsidian, Tasmanian Devil, and Triumph. Longtime JLI-era characters such as Captain Atom, Martian Manhunter, and Power Girl were revised and revamped.

By 1996, with the commercial success of the series fading, each of the titles was eventually cancelled.

=== Miniseries ===
In 2003, Giffen, DeMatteis, and Maguire reunited for the six-issue miniseries Formerly Known as the Justice League. This depicted Maxwell Lord trying to get the gang back together as The Super Buddies – a hero-for-hire group that operated out of a strip mall. 2005 saw a second storyline, I Can't Believe It's Not the Justice League, by the same creative team published in the pages of JLA Classified. This tale told a story of the characters attempt to rescue Ice from Hell.

=== Return ===
Following Blackest Night, DC launched two alternating 24-issue bi-weekly comic book miniseries, Brightest Day and Justice League: Generation Lost, written by Keith Giffen and Judd Winick. This second series features Captain Atom, Booster Gold, the new Blue Beetle (Jaime Reyes), Fire, Ice, and a new Rocket Red (Gavril Ivanovich) and essentially saw the return of Justice League International, as explained by Giffen:

In all of my years in comics, I have never experienced anything like the complete 180 this project took once the brainstorming kicked off. Like I said, when we started the writers' summit, the Justice League... hell, why mince words... Justice League International was not on the table. Then someone, and I really wish I remembered exactly who, stirred the JLI into the mix.

Over the course of the series, Power Girl and Batman joined the group as well, with Wonder Woman appearing in the book's final three issues. The title was heavily tied to Winick's run on Power Girl, which had the title character dealing with villains connected to Maxwell Lord's plans in Generation Lost, and eventually had her rejoin Justice League International after a crossover between the two titles. The title also indirectly tied into Odyssey, a storyline published in Wonder Woman that saw the title character being removed from history with her existence forgotten by most of her fellow heroes. This formed the basis of the book's finale, with the members of the Justice League International racing to track down Wonder Woman before Lord could find her and kill her. Plot threads from Kingdom Come and The OMAC Project also appeared.

Generation Lost ended with a teaser that a new Justice League International series from The New 52 would be coming in a few months (with Booster Gold as leader).

=== The New 52 ===
As part of DC's 2011 New 52 relaunch of all of its monthly books, Justice League International was relaunched in September 2011, after the conclusion of the Flashpoint storyline, written by Dan Jurgens and drawn by Aaron Lopresti.

This version of Justice League International is formed by United Nations director Andre Briggs as a UN-controlled counterpart to the original Justice League and is based out of the Hall of Justice. The founding members of the team consist of Booster Gold, Fire, Ice, Rocket Red (Gavril Ivanovich), Green Lantern (Guy Gardner), Vixen, August General in Iron, and Godiva, who are recruited to the team due to having their identities publicly known. Batman is denied membership due to having a secret identity, but is allowed to accompany the group as part of an effort to foster good relations between the JLI and the original Justice League. The team goes on to defeat the Signal Men and the alien conqueror Peraxxus.

During a press conference outside the Hall of Justice, Rocket Red is killed when a bomb explodes, while Fire, Ice and Vixen are hospitalized and become comatose. This leads Booster Gold to recruit Batwing, OMAC and Firehawk to the team.

DC canceled Justice League International in 2012, concluding with issue #12 and Justice League International Annual (vol. 2) #1 in August.

== Writers ==
- Keith Giffen: Justice League / Justice League International / Justice League America #1–60, Justice League / Justice League International / Justice League America Annual #1–5, Justice League International Special #1
- J.M. DeMatteis: Justice League / Justice League International / Justice League America #1–60, Justice League / Justice League International / Justice League America Annual #1–5
- Dan Jurgens: Justice League America #61–77, Justice League Spectacular #1, Justice League International (vol. 3) #1–12
- Dan Vado: Justice League America #78–91, Annual #8
- Christopher Priest: Justice League America #92, Annual #10, Justice League International (vol. 2) #68
- Gerard Jones: Justice League America #0, 93–113, Annual #9, Justice League Europe / Justice League International (vol. 2) #37–67, Annual #4–5, Justice League Spectacular #1

== Collected editions ==
Title	Material collected	Published date	ISBN
Justice League: A New Beginning	Justice League (vol. 1) #1-6, Justice League International (vol. 1) #7	May 1989	978-0930289409
Justice League International: The Secret Gospel of Maxwell Lord	Justice League International (vol. 1) #8–12, Justice League America Annual #1	February 1992	978-1563890390
Justice League International Volume 1	Justice League (vol. 1) #1-6, Justice League International (vol. 1) #7	March 2008	978-1401217396
Justice League International Volume 2	Justice League International (vol. 1) #8–13, Justice League Annual #1, Suicide Squad #13	August 2008	978-1401218263
Justice League International Volume 3	Justice League International (vol. 1) #14–22	November 2008	978-1401219413
Justice League International Volume 4	Justice League International (vol. 1) #23–25, Justice League America #26–30	March 2009	978-1401221966
Justice League International Volume 5	Justice League International Annual #2–3, Justice League Europe #1–6	January 2011	978-1401230104
Justice League International Volume 6	Justice League America #31–35, Justice League Europe #7–11	May 2011	978-1401231194
Justice League International Book One: Born Again	Justice League (vol. 1) #1-6, Justice League International (vol. 1) #7-17, Justice League Annual #1, Justice League International Annual #2, Suicide Squad #13	January 2020	978-1401295714
Justice League International Book Two: Around the World	Justice League International (vol. 1) #18-25, Justice League America #26-30, Justice League Europe #1–6, Justice League International Annual #3	January 2021	978-1779507617
Superman & Justice League America Vol. 1	Justice League America #61–68, Justice League Spectacular #1	March 2016	978-1401260972
Superman & Justice League America Vol. 2	Justice League America #69–77, Annual #6	September 2016	978-1401263843
Wonder Woman & Justice League America Vol. 1	Justice League America #78–85, Annual #7, Guy Gardner #15	March 2017	978-1401268343
Wonder Woman & Justice League America Vol. 2	Justice League America #86-91, Justice League International (vol. 2) #65-66, Justice League Task Force #13-14	October 2017	978-1401274009
Justice League: Corporate Maneuvers	Justice League Quarterly #1-4	February 2020	978-1401299064
Justice League International Omnibus Vol. 1	Justice League (vol. 1) #1-6, Annual #1, Justice League International (vol. 1) #7-25, Annual #2-3, Justice League Europe #1-6, Justice League America #26-30, Suicide Squad #13	October 2017	978-1401273866
Justice League International Omnibus Vol. 2	Justice League America #31-50, Justice League Europe #7-25, Justice League America Annual #4, Justice League Europe Annual #1, Justice League Quarterly #1, Justice League International Special #1	November 2020	978-1779502964
Justice League International Omnibus Vol. 3	Justice League America #51-60, Justice League Europe #26-36, Justice League America Annual #5, Justice League Europe Annual #2, Justice League Quarterly #2-5, Justice League International Special #2, Formerly Known as the Justice League #1-6, JLA: Classified #4-9, DC Retroactive: Justice League America - the 90s #1 Secret Origins #33-35, Green Lantern #18, JLA 80-Page Giant #1	May 2024	978-1779525642
Formerly Known as the Justice League	Formerly Known as the Justice League #1-6	April 2004	978-1401203054
I Can't Believe It's Not The Justice League	JLA: Classified #4–9	December 2005	978-1401204785
Justice League: Generation Lost Vol. 1	Justice League: Generation Lost #1–12	April 2011	978-1401230203
Justice League: Generation Lost Vol. 2	Justice League: Generation Lost #13–24	October 2011	978-1401232832
Justice League International Vol. 1: The Signal Masters	Justice League International (vol. 3) #1–6	May 2012	978-1401235345
Justice League International Vol. 2: Breakdown	Justice League International (vol. 3) #7–12, Annual (vol. 2) #1, The Fury of Firestorm: The Nuclear Men #9	January 2013	978-1401237936
Convergence: Zero Hour Book One	Convergence: Justice League International #1-2 and Convergence: Catwoman #1-2, Convergence: Superboy #1-2, Convergence: Green Arrow #1-2, Convergence: Suicide Squad #1-2	October 2015	978-1401258399

== In other media ==
The JLI's initial roster as they appear in Batman: The Brave and the Bold.

Justice League International appears in Batman: The Brave and the Bold. Introduced in the episode "Darkseid Descending!", this version of the team is assembled by Batman, Aquaman, and Martian Manhunter to combat Darkseid following an unspecified incident that led to the Justice League's disbandment, initially consists of them, Blue Beetle, Booster Gold, Guy Gardner, Fire, and Ice, and are based in the Justice League Satellite. In subsequent episodes, Rip Hunter, Robin, Kid Flash, Superman, Wonder Woman, Plastic Man, Green Arrow, Captain Atom, Captain Marvel, and Rocket Red join the team.

== Reception ==
Martin A. Stever reviewed Justice League International Space Gamer/Fantasy Gamer No. 83. Stever commented that "thanks to clever characterization and wit, this creative team makes team moving day as exciting and as much fun as a brush with Armageddon".

== See also ==
- List of Justice League members
