= Waverider (character) =

- The Matthew Ryder incarnation of Waverider as depicted in Superman: Legacy of Superman #1 (February 1993). Art by Arthur Adams.

Publication information
- Publisher: DC Comics
- First appearance: Armageddon 2001 #1 (May 1991)
- Created by: Archie Goodwin; Dan Jurgens

In-story information
- Alter ego: Matthew Ryder
- Team affiliations: Linear Men; Justice League
- Abilities: Time travel; Can access a person's aura and see their past and possible future; Quantum energy blasts; Lightspeed flight; Invisibility; Intangibility

Waverider (Matthew Ryder) is a superhero appearing in media published by DC Comics universe. He was created by Archie Goodwin and Dan Jurgens, with the first version of the character, Matthew Ryder, first appearing in Armageddon 2001 #1 (May 1991). A second version of the character is a Hypertime-line counterpart and partner of the original, who became Waverider after his superpowered doppelgänger's death during the storyline Zero Hour: Crisis in Time! (September 1994).

A third version of the character first appeared in Convergence: Booster Gold #2 (July 2015) as a reborn older version of the pre-Flashpoint Booster Gold (also created by Jurgens). After his transformation, he is instrumental to saving the multiverse in Convergence #8. His powers are the same as the original Waverider, but his knowledge and history are Booster Gold's.

== Fictional character biography ==
In the year 2030, Earth is ruled by a villain named Monarch, who has managed to kill all of the planet's superheroes. Matthew Ryder, a scientist, discovers that Monarch was once a hero and built a time machine to travel to the past and learn Monarch's identity. Ryder is merged with the time stream and gains the ability to travel through time and see into the future. With his new powers and appearance, Ryder becomes Waverider.

When Waverider travels to the past, he accidentally comes into contact with Captain Atom, generating a massive amount of temporal energy. This creates an opening in the quantum field, which allows Monarch to travel back in time to ensure his own existence. When Monarch kills Dove, her partner Hawk becomes enraged, beats Monarch, and unmasks him, only to see that Monarch is his future self.

=== Post-Armageddon ===
When Waverider is traveling through the time stream, he encounters an alternate timeline version of himself, who remains a regular human (since Monarch's future reign had been erased). Waverider and his alternate self join the Linear Men, a group that protects the time stream, with the powerless Ryder eventually becoming the team's leader. Despite the Linear Men's policy of non-intervention in the timeline, Waverider comes to Superman's aid when he discovers that Doomsday has returned to life and is now working with the Cyborg Superman. Recognizing the danger of Doomsday's existence, Waverider tells Superman of Doomsday's origin as a genetically engineered being capable of evolving to overcome anything that proved capable of killing him. Superman and Waverider defeat Doomsday by taking him to the end of time, where he is destroyed by entropy.

During the Zero Hour: Crisis in Time! storyline, Waverider is killed by Extant, who had evolved from Monarch. His alternate self, Matthew Ryder, survives and is shortly thereafter contacted by Metron. At Metron's insistence, Ryder becomes the second Waverider and assists a group of heroes in thwarting Parallax's effort to recreate the universe.

=== Successors ===
==== Linear Woman ====
Black Beetle, Despero, Ultra-Humanite, and Per Degaton intend on finding Rip Hunter and killing him so that the time stream would no longer be guarded. Black Beetle takes his allies to a destroyed Vanishing Point and reveals that Rip Hunter and the Linear Men were never in agreement about how to handle time. He also reveals that Rip Hunter, tired of the Linear Men's interference, locked them away in a cell at Vanishing Point. The four villains find the cell and tore it open, seeing an alive Matthew Ryder and Liri Lee in it. Black Beetle asks the Linear Men to help bring Waverider back to life. However, Supernova prevents Black Beetle from succeeding, and sends the villains back to the present.

The Linear Men teleport through time to search for Waverider's corpse in the desolate wasteland of Earth's future. After Black Beetle finds Waverider's corpse, he double-crosses them, revealing his plan to use Waverider's power to become invulnerable. Black Beetle attempts to fuse with Waverider's corpse and gain his power, but he is thwarted by Supernova. Liri Lee fuses with Waverider's corpse to become Linear Woman, after which Black Beetle escapes. Rip Hunter and the rest of the Time Masters then arrive. However, Linear Woman refuses to agree with Rip Hunter's rules of time travel and teleports herself and Matthew Ryder through the timestream.

==== Booster Gold ====
As the older iteration of pre-Flashpoint Booster Gold is dying due to excessive time travel, his son, Rip Hunter, has the New 52 Booster take him to Vanishing Point, where the older Booster is taken to a secret room. The original surrenders his body to the time stream and emerges as a new version of Waverider.

== Powers and abilities ==
Waverider can time-travel at will, and is capable of accessing the time stream and monitoring it. He can also access a person's aura, and, by touching them, can predict their most likely future at any time in their life. Waverider can also fly at the speed of light, fire quantum energy blasts, and become invisible and intangible.

== In other media ==
- The Matthew Ryder incarnation of Waverider makes non-speaking cameo appearances in Justice League Unlimited as a member of the Justice League.
- The Matthew Ryder incarnation of Waverider appears as a character summon in Scribblenauts Unmasked: A DC Comics Adventure.
- The Matthew Ryder incarnation of Waverider received an action figure in Mattel's Justice League Unlimited toy line in early 2006.
