= Rip Hunter =

- Rip Hunter as depicted in Time Masters: Vanishing Point #1 (September 2010). Art by Dan Jurgens and Norm Rapmund.

Publication information
- Publisher: DC Comics
- First appearance: Showcase #20 (June 1959)
- Created by: Jack Miller (writer); Ruben Moreira (artist)

In-story information
- Alter ego: Nathaniel Ware
- Species: Human
- Team affiliations: Linear Men; Forgotten Heroes; Legends; Time Bureau; Time Masters
- Partnerships: Booster Gold; Supernova; Goldstar
- Abilities: Genius level inventor Time travel Skilled in fighting styles and martial arts from every era of history

Rip Hunter is a time-traveling superhero appearing in American comic books published by DC Comics. Created by writer Jack Miller and artist Ruben Moreira, the character first appeared in Showcase #20 (May 1959). Following three more appearances in Showcase (#21, 25, 26), Rip Hunter was given his own series which ran for 29 issues (1961–65). He later starred in the eight-issue Time Masters series (1990), written by Bob Wayne and Lewis Shiner. After numerous revisions and following the events of the 2005 "Infinite Crisis" storyline, Hunter is established as the son of Booster Gold.

Arthur Darvill portrays Rip Hunter in the Arrowverse television series Legends of Tomorrow.

== Publication history ==
The cover of Showcase #20 (May 1959), art by Bob Brown and Ira Schnapp, featuring the debut of Rip Hunter.

The Challengers of the Unknown is a quartet of science fiction adventurers created by Jack Kirby. They debuted in 1957, and their commercial success spawned two other science fiction characters: Cave Carson and Rip Hunter. Hunter was the more successful of the two, with art in his early appearances by Joe Kubert, Mike Sekowsky, and Nick Cardy. Hunter was the leader of a gang of time travelers who were featured in brisk and historically accurate adventures in various eras. DC editor Jack Schiff reported that he and writer Jack Miller had "lots of fun" creating the comics.

Rip Hunter has had numerous revisions within the fictional DC Universe. Those changes are generally connected to larger events and story lines. The writing and editorial staff often use a narrative device within the comics, known as a crisis event, to explain dramatic changes to the appearance or personality of characters. Hunter has undergone several different developments within this fictional universe.

== Fictional character biography ==
Cover of Time Masters #1. Art by Art Thibert.

In his original incarnation, Rip Hunter is portrayed as an ordinary man who uses his invention, the Time Sphere, to travel through time. Aided by his friend Jeff Smith, girlfriend Bonnie Baxter, and Bonnie's younger brother Corky, they have adventures in time. These stories were told in the series Rip Hunter...Time Master which ran for 29 issues between 1961 and 1965.

Rip is next seen in the series Challengers of the Unknown, where, in the year AD 12,000,000, he assists the Challengers of the Unknown, Swamp Thing, and Deadman in defeating the dictatorial Sun Lords. The character's next major appearance is in Action Comics #552–554. With the aid of Superman and the Forgotten Heroes, he prevents an alien invasion of Earth.

The Forgotten Heroes are then seen in the 1985 series Crisis on Infinite Earths, a mini-series intended to change the fictional universe shared by DC characters. During this story, Hunter enables the superheroes of the multiverse to travel to the dawn of time, where they face off against the Anti-Monitor. The multiverse is destroyed in the ensuing battle, with the remaining universes being merged into one. Hunter then reunites with some of his Forgotten Heroes teammates, as well as cosmic heroes Adam Strange and Captain Comet in a quest to defeat the Anti-Monitor once and for all. With the help of Brainiac, they journey to Apokolips, where Darkseid uses his advanced science to peer into the Anti-Matter universe and aid Alex Luthor, Superman, and Superboy-Prime in the ultimate destruction of the Anti-Monitor. This narrative event allowed the writing staff of DC Comics to alter many of their heroes and fictional situations.

The version of Rip Hunter native to this new universe is also a master of time travel, and aids heroes Booster Gold and Animal Man in their own time-traveling adventures before taking on the vast Illuminati conspiracy during the eight-issue series Time Masters. This more gritty and realistic (symbolized by jeans and a T-shirt rather than a costume) take on the character attempts to change the past to prevent the Illuminati, led by Vandal Savage, from coming into existence. During the series, a relative of the character known as Dan Hunter decides to stay in the past at the time of the Revolutionary War. This is used to create a link between Rip and the pre-existing western themed Dan Hunter, a character associated with Tomahawk. This series concludes with Hunter being stranded in the prehistoric past.

Rip is then depicted as attracting the attention of the Linear Men with his clumsy exploration of time. To protect Hunter and the integrity of history, the Linear Men recruit him into their ranks and the writers altered the appearance of Rip, using the stress of time travel as an explanation for those changes. Now, with white hair and bionic implants, he is seen in several series that involve time, or the manipulation of time as an element of the narrative—most notably during the Zero Hour: Crisis in Time! mini-series and event.

In The Kingdom, Hunter turns on the other Linear Men, who believe that time follows a single course of events, and joins forces with Superman, Batman, and Wonder Woman. Rip also joins forces with young heroes from the future, to stop the time-traveling villain Gog in his efforts to destroy Kansas twenty years ahead of schedule. As a result of this battle, Hunter finally breaks down the barrier to Hypertime, revealing that the Linear Men are wrong about the non-existence of alternate timelines in the post-Crisis universe. Rip also reveals that the timeline of the Kingdom can exist, regardless of what happens in the present.

Shortly thereafter, the Linear Men, including the original character of Hunter, are destroyed during Imperiex's onslaught. Although their consciousnesses survive, and they eventually construct new bodies for themselves, they have been driven insane by the experience. The Quintessence, a group of cosmic beings who counsel one another, disband the Linear Men, and Hunter vanishes in a whirlwind.

In the Chronos series, starring Walker Gabriel, an alternate version of Gabriel, experimenting with time travel to avert World War III, mentions a horrible accident suffered by a Commander Hunter, who apparently scattered himself across time, with only "bits of flesh and bone" which kept resynchronizing in the lab.

Rip's next major appearance is within the page of 2004's Justice Society of America, where he takes members of the modern day Justice Society of America back in time to fight the villainous Per Degaton. Once again, Rip serves as a device that allows for time-travel, and for other heroes to do so. This version of the character returns to a sci-fi influenced costume and the use of a time bubble. The ramifications of being a time-traveler are explored by writer Geoff Johns, who turns the name Rip Hunter into an alias. This is explained as being part of an attempt by the character to hide all of the details of his history, lest an enemy travel back in time and kill him as a child.

=== 52 ===
The themes of time and changes to the timeline are next explored in the weekly series 52. Following up from events in the Infinite Crisis mini-series, Booster Gold tries to contact Hunter. Booster discovers his base of operations in a time-locked concrete bunker in the Arizona desert, but when he finally manages to enter the bunker, he finds only a blackboard, a globe, and some pieces of paper filled with writings about the future. These papers had references to facts and events like the mortality of Vandal Savage, the last Lazarus Pit of Nyssa Raatko, and the appearances of the mysterious Supernova. The purpose of the blackboard was to provide clues for the readers of upcoming storylines within that series and other DC Universe titles.

As this series progresses, more and more time-traveling characters, such as Waverider are killed by a mysterious figure who is later revealed to be Booster Gold's robot companion Skeets.

Hunter finally emerges in the bottled city of Kandor. Working with Supernova, Hunter has been trying to put together a machine that will "fix" time before Skeets can find him. When Skeets attacks Kandor, Supernova turns back into Booster Gold and battles Skeets using special items gathered from the planet. Rip Hunter and Booster then teleport away, angering Skeets even more. After discovering Mister Mind burrowing into Skeets' shell, Rip uses T. O. Morrow and the severed head of Red Tornado as bait for him. Mind metamorphoses into a nigh-omnipotent imago form, a universe-eating hyperfly. Hunter then reveals to Booster Gold and Booster's ancestor Daniel Carter that the multiverse is restored as 52 individual universes as a result of Alex Luthor's actions after he escaped his "paradise dimension". Subsequently, the heroes seal Mind in a time rift to save the multiverse. Hunter warns the others to keep the multiverse a secret for the time being as he eagerly prepares to explore it.

=== Booster Gold ===
Rip is next seen as an integral part of the cast of the Booster Gold series, where he acts as a companion and boss to Booster Gold. Rip is later revealed to be the son of Booster Gold. He convinces Booster to turn down membership in the recently reformed Justice League and pretend to be incompetent to make sure that his father's legacy is one of failure and is ultimately forgotten by history. This is done to ensure rogue time travelers have no motivation to kill Booster in the past, which would also prevent Rip's birth. Rip and an older Booster occasionally would interact during the present version's mission, as they discuss the need to manipulate Booster (in particular, teaching him not to change history when Booster demands they prevent the death of Ted Kord).

In this new version, Rip Hunter's methods are darker than previously portrayed: he imprisoned the surviving members of the Linear Men after they tried to mess with the timeline to save Waverider; and Rip tortured Rex Hunter when Rex refused to give him information. Rip might have also been motivated by a personal grudge, as Rex was a former Time Master who had murdered Rips' previous team. Rex had been working with the Time Stealers and was killed by them before Rip could learn any information.

=== Time Masters: Vanishing Point ===
Rip, along with Booster Gold, Superman, and Hal Jordan starred in Time Masters: Vanishing Point (2010–11), a limited series that is a companion piece to Batman: The Return of Bruce Wayne. The series followed the heroes' journey to find Batman, who was lost in time in Final Crisis.

=== "Convergence" ===
Though Rip Hunter was shown blinking out of existence following the end of the 2011 storyline Flashpoint, Convergence reveals that he survived and may have turned against his father, Booster Gold (who survived the continuity reboot of the DC Universe that occurred in the aftermath of Flashpoint). Through means that are yet to be revealed, Rip almost managed to prevent his father from frantically warning his newly created counterpart that the romance between Wonder Woman and Superman will erase the past of his future from existence.

=== Vertigo ===
A Rip Hunter story by writer Damon Lindelof and artist Jeff Lemire appeared in Time Warp #1, published by Vertigo in May 2013.

=== DC Rebirth ===
In 2016, DC Comics implemented another relaunch of its books called DC Rebirth, restoring its continuity to a form much as it was before The New 52. Rip was seen in the DC Nuclear Winter Special #1, stranded on a post-apocalyptic version of Earth's future telling holiday stories about DC heroes from alternate earths, the future, and the past to some cannibals trying to eat him, stalling for time while he recharged the battery in his Time Sphere.

Rip Hunter was about to leave by Boom Tube after he had saved his father and his best friend from a battle. Rip's friend Trixie wanted to say good to him, and was wondering why Rip cared for Booster Gold for. Rip revealed to Trixie that Booster Gold was his father, and that he did not want to embarrass her with a long story about time travel, before leaving.

== Collected Editions ==
Showcase Presents: Rip Hunter Time Master Vol 1 (2012) Collects DC Showcase 20-21 and 25-26 Time Masters (vol 1) 1-15 Softcover ISBN 978-1-4012-3521-5

Time Masters (2008) Collects Time Masters (1990) Mini Series Softcover ISBN 978-1-4012-1659-7

Time Masters: Vanishing Point (2011) Collects Time Masters: Vanishing Point (2010) Mini Series. Softcover ISBN 978-1-4012-3047-0

== In other media ==
Arthur Darvill as Rip Hunter in Legends of Tomorrow.

=== Television ===
- Rip Hunter appears in Batman: The Brave and the Bold, voiced by Brian Bloom.
- Rip Hunter appears in Legends of Tomorrow, portrayed by Arthur Darvill. This version is a rogue Time Master who came to the present to assemble the titular group and oppose Vandal Savage. In the second season, Rip is temporarily brainwashed into joining the Legion of Doom. In the third season, he forms the Time Bureau to fix time anachronisms and defeat the time entity Mallus, ultimately sacrificing himself in the season finale to save his teammates.

=== Video games ===
- Rip Hunter appears as an NPC in DC Universe Online.
- Rip Hunter appears as a character summon in Scribblenauts Unmasked: A DC Comics Adventure.
