= Armageddon 2001 =

1991 DC Comics crossover event

- Cover art of Armageddon 2001, volume 1, issue #2 (Oct. 1991), art by Dan Jurgens.
- Publisher: DC Comics
- Publication date: May – October 1991
- Genre: Crossover; Time travel
Title(s)
- Action Comics Annual #3
- Adventures of Superman Annual #3
- Armageddon 2001 #1-2
- Detective Comics Annual #4
- Flash Annual #4
- Batman Annual #15
- Hawk and Dove Annual #2
- Hawkworld Annual #2
- Justice League America Annual #5
- Justice League Europe Annual #2
- L.E.G.I.O.N. '91 Annual #2
- Superman Annual #3
- The New Titans Annual #7
- Armageddon: Alien Agenda #1-4
- Armageddon: Inferno #1-4
- Action Comics #670
- Superman (vol. 2) #61
- Captain Atom: Armageddon #1-9
- Main characters: Waverider; Monarch

Creative team
- Writers: Archie Goodwin; Dennis O'Neil
- Penciller: Dan Jurgens
- Inkers: Dick Giordano; Steve Mitchell; Art Thibert
- Colorists: Adrienne Roy; Anthony Tollin

"Armageddon 2001" is a 1991 crossover event storyline published by DC Comics. It ran through a self-titled, two-issue limited series and most of the annuals DC published that year from May through October (Legion of Super-Heroes Annual #2 did not tie-in to the storyline). After the event, there were two limited series, Armageddon: The Alien Agenda #1-4 (which was a direct sequel) and Armageddon: Inferno #1-4 (which was only tangentially related).

Each participating annual explored potential possible futures for its main characters. The guiding hands behind the series were editor and writer Dennis O'Neil, writer Archie Goodwin and artist Dan Jurgens.

== Plot ==
=== Monarch ===
Monarch was an oppressive tyrant from a bleak, dystopian Earth 50 years in the future. The people were unhappy with his rule, particularly a scientist named Matthew Ryder, an expert on temporal studies, who was convinced he could use his technology to travel back in time and prevent the maniacal ruler from ever coming to power. He learned that in the late 20th century one of Earth's superheroes had become evil. In the year 2001 this hero had killed all of his comrades, assumed the identity of Monarch, and began his rise to global domination. Because Monarch always appeared in a suit of full body armor his prior identity was unknown.

Chosen by Monarch to take part in a time-travel experiment, Ryder traveled back to 1991, the year in which the series was published, and 10 years before Monarch's massacre of Earth's heroes. Ryder was determined to find out who the Monarch really was and, if possible, kill him before he could rise to power. As he travelled through the rift, his body mutated into a form of living temporal energy, and upon arriving at his destination, he took the name Waverider.

=== Waverider ===
Waverider used the superhuman abilities he gained during his transformation to peer into several possible futures of different members of various superheroes in the DC Universe, seeing where they would be in the year 2001, when Monarch's rise to power began, but he was unable to pinpoint exactly who would become Monarch. After several attempts, he began to rethink his approach, but Waverider accidentally came in physical contact with Captain Atom, unleashing a storm of temporal energy that opened a gate to the future through which Monarch emerged. Monarch, it seems, had been monitoring Waverider's every move in the past ever since he left the future and merely waited for the perfect time to travel back and stop him from erasing his existence.

=== Hawk and Dove ===
In Hawk and Dove Annual #2, Waverider looked into Hank Hall's future to see him fight and die at the hands of Monarch in 2001. The Dove's power interacts with Waverider's, allowing him to see a multitude of futures to the point Waverider comments "No matter the future they fought him but never became him"; Waverider finally touches both Hawk and Dove to see their daughter Unity alter Monarch's mind.

In Armageddon 2001 #2, in a subsequent battle with the Justice League, Monarch retreated, taking Dawn Granger, the current Dove, with him. Hank Hall (the Hawk), who was also a captive, watched as Monarch killed the Dove in front of his own eyes. Being created as two beings whose natures were supposed to be in balance, Hank became enraged when his partner's pacifist nature could no longer contain his warlike spirit. He beat Monarch to death, only to learn the horrible truth: he was the one who would be the Monarch of the future. Upon seeing Monarch's dead body and the device he was building to enslave humanity, he mused that Earth would need someone to keep the balance, so he put on Monarch's armor and continued building his machine.

Eventually, the Justice League found him, and Captain Atom, feeling guilty he let Monarch slip through the timestream in the first place, decided to fight him one-on-one. The battle caused Atom's energy and Monarch's suit to clash, creating a portal that sent both of them back in time to the Age of Dinosaurs.

=== The Alien Agenda ===
When hostile aliens encounter Monarch and Atom in the past (sometime between 230 and 65 million years ago), they attempted to enlist both (without either's knowledge) to assist them in creating a wormhole. The wormhole's creation would destroy the universe in which the primitive Earth existed, but would allow the aliens to freely travel.

The creation of the wormhole hinged on a sophisticated, bowling ball-shaped "trigger". Captain Atom next causes an explosion on the primitive Earth, which propels both him and the trigger forward in time to Emperor Nero (A.D. 54-68) era Rome. Monarch strikes a bargain to retrieve the trigger if the aliens agree to place him back in his own time. Monarch allows the aliens to place him in stasis with an alien companion and a device that will awaken them when it senses Captain Atom.

Once awake, Monarch follows Atom through Nero's Rome, the "Old West" (approx. late 1890s), and finally into World War II (estimated near 1945 - as they are testing atomic power). In the World War II era, they stumble onto an atomic test (which Atom is aware of, but Monarch is not) and Atom is blasted into the present, while Monarch's fate is left unknown.

== Response and last-minute changes ==
At some point during the crossover it was revealed that Captain Atom would be the hero who became Monarch. The conclusion of the Annual for Justice League Europe, the final crossover issue before the conclusion of the story, seemed to confirm this leak. Waverider had seen the futures of various Justice League Europe members but had not scanned Captain Atom, who was away at the time. The final panel of the issue showed Waverider about to touch Captain Atom, who had just returned, and a text box stated that the story would be concluded in the second issue of Armageddon 2001.

In response to the leak, the originally-intended ending was changed at the last minute: Monarch was revealed to be, not Captain Atom, but rather the Hawk. The problem with this reveal was that Waverider had seen Hank Hall fight and die against Monarch and that the Dove had allowed him to see so many futures as to conclude "No matter the future they fought him but never became him", making Hank Hall and Dawn Granger the only two heroes Monarch could not be. They were the only characters shown in this situation, and thus any of the other major characters could have been Monarch without creating a continuity issue.

This revelation was unpopular among both fans and professionals, in part because of the continuity issue mentioned above and the disregard for the clues placed in previous issues. Additionally, it required Hawk to behave in ways that many felt to be out of character. This also made it impossible to continue using either Hawk or Dove as they had in the past and necessitated the cancellation of the Hawk & Dove series. Karl Kesel, the writer of Hawk & Dove, commented that "Hawk and Dove was always a love story. Then one day, Hawk went insane and murdered Dove".

A storyline in JSA later revealed that the ending of Armageddon 2001 had been faked by Mordru. He had created an illusion of the Dove being murdered by a future Hawk/Monarch in order to drive the current Hawk insane. He then took control of Hawk and used him to impregnate Dove so she would give birth to a child that would inherit all the powers of the Lords of Chaos and Order. Mordru cast a spell on Dove that kept her in a comatose state for years. She did give birth to a child, but before Mordru could possess the child's body, it was instead inhabited by a reincarnated Hector Hall who aged the body to adulthood and thus caused it to become the new Doctor Fate. Much later, while searching for his wife Lyta, Hector would discover Dove and bring her out of Mordru's spell, revealing the truth of these events. She would then discover that her sister had inherited Hawk's powers after the death of Hank Hall.

== Annual tie-ins ==
In addition to the bookend issues, the storyline followed Waverider through multiple annuals:

- Armageddon 2001 #1 leads to Superman Annual (vol. 2) #3 (by Jurgens and penciller Dusty Abell; Superman attempts to rid the world of nuclear weapons, but is instead killed by Batman at the government's behest (the plot was the inverse of Frank Miller's Batman: The Dark Knight Returns, and contains homages to that story). It leads to Batman Annual #15.
- Batman Annual #15 - The time traveler, Waverider, shows Batman a possible future. In the near future of 2001, an aged Batman is found guilty of murder for the accidental death of the Penguin and sentenced to death. Anarky, an anarchist anti-villain, sympathizes with the fallen hero and breaks into the prison in an attempt to rescue Batman mere hours before the execution is to take place. Believing himself guilty, Batman initially refuses to escape, but when he discovers evidence that the accident was set up by a third party, he escapes to pursue the true murderer.
- Justice League America Annual #5 - written by Keith Giffen and J.M. DeMatteis; Guy Gardner starts his own cult, while Fire bankrupts the Blue Beetle. The story is humorous in tone, much like the JLA books at the time. It leads to Hawk and Dove Annual #2.
- Hawk and Dove Annual #2 - written by Karl and Barbara Kesel; The daughter of the Hawk and the Dove takes on Monarch.
- Hawkworld Annual #2 - written by John Ostrander; Hawkman and Hawkwoman come out of retirement to face a robot.
- Flash Annual #4 - written by Mark Waid; Wally West has entered the Witness Protection Program, but becomes the Flash once again to rescue his super-powered son from his former Rogues Gallery.
- L.E.G.I.O.N. '91 Annual #2 - by Alan Grant and penciller Mike McKone; Dox and Lady Quark take over the universe.
- The New Titans Annual #7 - Nightwing leads the Team Titans on guerrilla raids against a fascist government. While most of the annuals had no real consequences for the ongoing series they were attached to, The New Titans Annual #1 tied in significantly to ongoing storylines. The future group of "Team Titans" depicted in the Annual had been present in the ongoing series for some time as seemingly antagonistic figures.
- Action Comics Annual #3 - by writer Roger Stern and penciller Tom Grummett; Superman becomes President of the United States, after remembering moments of the previously probable future seen in Superman Annual (vol. 2) #3.
- Detective Comics Annual #4 - Batman vs. Talia.
- The Adventures of Superman Annual #3 - by writer Louise Simonson and penciller Bryan Hitch; Lois Lane dies while pregnant with Superman's child and a widowed Superman eventually romances Maxima. It leads to Justice League Europe Annual #2.
- Justice League Europe Annual #2 - The JLE are lost in time. It leads to Armageddon 2001 #2.

=== Aftermath titles ===
- Action Comics #670
- Superman (vol. 2) #61

=== Sequel miniseries ===
- Armageddon: The Alien Agenda #1-4
- Armageddon: Inferno #1-4

== Aftermath ==
After Armageddon 2001, Waverider continued to show up (next, in the cover of Action Comics #670, with Armageddon 2001's aftermath), mostly in the Superman titles (Superman (vol. 2) #61 depicts Superman and Waverider in the Metropolis disaster area, which is the same area seen in Action Comics #670, and follows Waverider and Superman almost immediately after Armageddon 2001), before playing an important role in 1994's Zero Hour: Crisis in Time! event which was likewise controlled by Jurgens.

None of the alternate futures shown in Armageddon 2001 came true and most of their events had no impact on the DC Universe. One exception was The New Titans crossover which showed a group of super-powered teens fighting against a god-like dictator. These characters had already appeared in New Titans, having traveled back in time to prevent their future from happening.

== In other media ==
The title "Armageddon" was given the five-part episode crossover during the eighth season of the Arrowverse series The Flash. It borrows the idea of a hero becoming a villain in the future, in the show's case Barry Allen, and a figure traveling back in time to prevent it, Despero filling the role occupied by Waverider in the original story.

== See also ==
- Publication history of DC Comics crossover events
- Zero Hour: Crisis in Time!
