= Linear Men =

Fictional characters, a fictional superhero team in the DC Comics universe

Publication information
- Publisher: DC Comics
- First appearance: Adventures of Superman #476 (March 1991)
- Created by: Dan Jurgens (script)

In-story information
- Base(s): Vanishing Point
- Member(s): Travis O'Connell; Rip Hunter; Liri Lee; Ryak the Rogue; Matthew Ryder; Waverider

The Linear Men are a superhero team appearing in American comic books published by DC Comics. They first appeared in Adventures of Superman #476 (March 1991).

== Fictional history ==
The Linear Men are a team of men and women who police time and work to resolve time paradoxes. The core team consists of Matthew Ryder (the leader and founder), an alternate future version of Ryder known as Waverider, Travis O'Connell, Liri Lee, and Rip Hunter, although other members of the Linear Men have been seen from time to time. An alternate Matthew, who was once employed by Lex Luthor, also became part of the team. They operate in the Vanishing Point, a base that exists at the end of the universe. The team's name is taken from the premise that after the Crisis on Infinite Earths, time is strictly linear and paradoxes can unravel the timeline.

Prior to Crisis on Infinite Earths, Travis O'Connell perishes when he detonates the moon in AD 2995. This is exactly what was supposed to happen and Travis O'Connell's sacrifice keeps the timeline on track.

During Gog's attack on Superman in the event The Kingdom, killing him in his present and then traveling back to the previous day to do it again, the Linear Men are shaken at the lack of anomalies on their equipment. Superman is constantly killed, yet their records still show him as alive in the 853rd century without any errors. Rip Hunter explains this anomaly to various key heroes when he reveals the existence of Hypertime, a mass of alternate timelines, which he had kept secret from the Linear Men due to their inability to accept its existence. Hunter then goes on the run from his former colleagues after he took the Superman, Batman, and Wonder Woman characters from the year 2020 (along with the children of various other heroes) back in time to 1999 to help the younger 'Trinity' stop Gog.

Rip Hunter eventually locks the Linear Men away for unknown reasons. In the Time Masters: Vanishing Point limited series, it is revealed that Rip and the Linear Men were never in agreement about how to handle time and that Rip, tired of the Linear Men's interference, locked them away in a cell at Vanishing Point. Later, Matthew Ryder and Liri Lee are freed from their imprisonment by the Time Stealers: Black Beetle, Despero, Per Degaton, and Ultra-Humanite. Black Beetle intends to use the Linear Men to bring Waverider to life, but Supernova stops Black Beetle and returns the Time Stealers to the present. However, Black Beetle escapes and the Linear Men go with him. They teleport through time to search for Waverider's corpse in the future Earth. After Black Beetle finds Waverider's corpse, he double-crosses them, revealing his plan to use Waverider's power to become invulnerable. Black Beetle attempts to fuse with the power of Waverider's corpse, but is thwarted by Supernova. Instead, Liri fuses with Waverider's corpse to become Linear Woman, after which Black Beetle escapes. Rip and the rest of the Time Masters arrive, but Linear Woman refuses to agree with Rip's rules of time travel and teleports herself and Matthew through the timestream.

== In other media ==
Legends of Tomorrow is loosely based on the Linear Men, with the eponymous group including Sara Lance, Atom (Ray Palmer), Mick Rory, Nate Heywood, Zari Tomaz, Wally West, John Constantine, Hawkman, Hawkgirl, Rip Hunter, Jefferson Jackson, Martin Stein, Leonard Snart, and Amaya Jiwe.
