= Booster Gold =

Fictional character

- Booster Gold, as he appeared on the promotional art of Booster Gold comic book series. Art by Dan Jurgens.

Publication information
- Publisher: DC Comics
- First appearance: Booster Gold #1 (February 1986)
- Created by: Dan Jurgens

In-story information
- Full name: Michael Jon "Booster" Carter
- Species: Human
- Team affiliations: Justice League; The Conglomerate; Justice League International; A.R.G.U.S. Extreme Justice
- Partnerships: Skeets; Blue Beetle; Michelle Carter; Rip Hunter; Godiva; Green Lantern
- Notable aliases: Supernova; Waverider; Gold Star; Green Lantern; Banana Man
- Abilities: Power suit grants: Superhuman strength, speed, endurance, and durability; Extended longevity; Force field generation; Energy blasts via gauntlets; Enhanced senses via visor; Time travel; Flight via ring; Expert athlete and hand-to-hand combatant

Booster Gold (Michael Jon "Booster" Carter) is a superhero appearing in American comic books published by DC Comics. Created by Dan Jurgens, the character first appeared in Booster Gold #1 (February 1986) and has been a member of the Justice League.

He is initially depicted as a glory-seeking showboat from the future based in Superman's home city, Metropolis, staging high-publicity heroics through his knowledge of historical events and futuristic technology. Carter develops over the course of his publication history and through personal tragedies to become a hero weighed down by his reputation.

The character has been portrayed in live action television by Eric Martsolf in Smallville and by Donald Faison in the seventh season of the Arrowverse series Legends of Tomorrow. Additionally, Tom Everett Scott, Diedrich Bader, and Bruce Timm have voiced Booster Gold in animation.

== Publication history ==
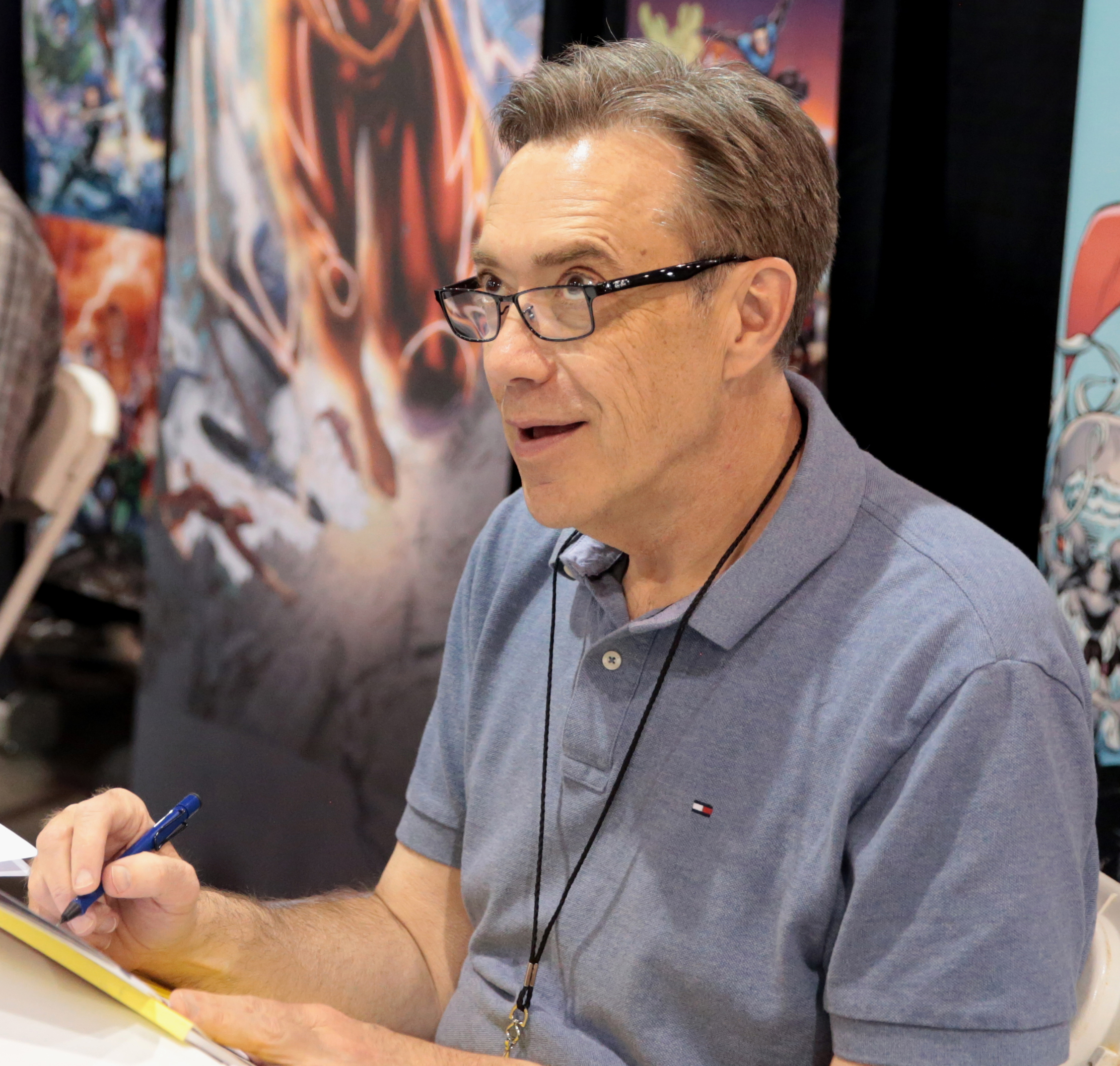
Dan Jurgens, the creator of Booster Gold, in 2017

Booster Gold first appeared in Booster Gold #1 (February 1986), being the first significant new character introduced into DC Universe continuity after Crisis on Infinite Earths. The next year, he began to appear regularly in the Justice League series remaining a team member until the group disbanded in 1996. He and his former Leaguers subsequently appeared as the "Superbuddies" in the Formerly Known as the Justice League miniseries and its JLA: Classified sequel "I Can't Believe It's Not the Justice League".

At Wizard World Los Angeles in March 2007, Dan DiDio announced a new ongoing series titled All-New Booster Gold, which was later published as simply Booster Gold. The series follows the events of 52 and was initially co-written by Geoff Johns and Jeff Katz, with art by creator Jurgens and Norm Rapmund. The series focuses primarily on Booster Gold's clandestine time travel within the DC Universe. The series also features Rip Hunter, Skeets, and Booster's ancestors Daniel Carter and Rose Levin as supporting characters. The tagline of the series is: "The greatest hero you've never heard of!". Katz and Johns left the book after 12 issues (#1-10, #0, and a One Million issue). Jurgens and Rapmund stayed. Jurgens assumed writing duties following four issues by guests Chuck Dixon and Rick Remender.

In May 2010, Keith Giffen took over the Booster Gold title, linking it with the 26-week miniseries Justice League: Generation Lost, in which Booster worked with Fire, Ice, and Captain Atom to defeat the resurrected Maxwell Lord. From July 2010 through February 2011, Booster starred alongside Rip Hunter, Green Lantern, and Superman in the six-issue miniseries Time Masters: Vanishing Point, part of the "Return of Bruce Wayne" arc, which also reintroduced the Reverse-Flash and established the background for the 2011 DC crossover event Flashpoint. Jurgens returned to the main Booster Gold title with issue #44.

=== Development ===
Jurgens's 1984 series proposal for Booster Gold compared the hero to U.S. Olympic Gold athletes such as Dorothy Hamill, Peggy Fleming, and Bruce Jenner, who had turned "Olympic gold into commercial gold", selling multiple products based on their fame and past accomplishments. Booster's origin as a security guard at a future Superman museum was altered when writer/artist John Byrne was brought to DC to reboot Superman's origin in The Man of Steel.

=== Legacy ===
Since his origin, other characters within the DC Universe have hinted that there is a greater purpose to Booster Gold than he knows.

During the Millennium event, Harbinger reveals to Martian Manhunter that Booster is descended from the Chosen and that he must be protected. It is revealed that Booster is destined to come to the past to protect him from an unknown event in the future. In 52, Rip states that the moment Booster helped save the multiverse from Mister Mind would be remembered in the future as the start of Gold's "glory years." Later, in the new Booster Gold series, Rip hints at a "Carter heroic legacy." It is then revealed that Booster is important to the Time Masters, as he will train "the greatest of them all", being the father and the teacher of Rip Hunter himself, who willingly chose to protect his identity against other time-travelers, to pass through history as the only loser of the clan. Despite the general distrust of Booster, Rip and his descendants apparently know the truth, always honoring him.

Due to the complicated time-travel mechanics, Booster's future self, "currently" operating from an unknown era with his time-travel educated wife, still watches over his past self and his son, making sure that Rip Hunter gives his past self proper schooling. The older Booster acts in total anonymity, and has access to other "time-lost" equipment than his suit, such as Superboy's seemingly-destroyed "super-goggles".

Due to a temporal paradox, the future Booster is revealed to be a more experienced Time Master than his son Rip Hunter, but also that he personally tasked Rip to school his past self. It is also implied that the departure of the Hypertime concept, rather than a simple retcon, is Booster's work, as in the future he tasked himself with the role of pruning divergent timelines from each universe in the multiverse.

== Fictional character biography ==
=== From the future ===
Michael Jon Carter was born poor in 25th-century Gotham City. He and his twin sister, the slightly younger Michelle, never knew their father because he left after gambling away all their money. Michael was a gifted athlete, attending Gotham University on a football scholarship. At Gotham U., Michael was a star quarterback until his father reentered his life and convinced him to deliberately lose games for gambling purposes. He was exposed, disgraced and expelled. His twin sister Michelle, the more responsible of the two, took on multiple jobs to support their ailing mother. Later, he was able to secure a job as a night watchman at the Metropolis Space Museum where he studied displays about superheroes and villains from the past, particularly the 20th century.

Michael's sidekick is a robot named Skeets. Skeets is a 25th-century security robot (sometimes "valet unit") with artificial intelligence. He is capable of flight, cognition, and voice projection, which are all considered highly advanced for 21st century Earth. He also has historical records which give him a vast knowledge of what will happen between the 21st and 25th centuries, though its reliability has become questionable. He possesses numerous miniature tools and weapons kept within his shell, and is also equipped with a powerful energy blaster. He is apparently immune to reality and temporal manipulation.

With the help of Skeets, Michael stole devices from the museum displays, including a Legion of Super-Heroes flight ring and Brainiac 5's force field belt. He used Rip Hunter's Time Sphere, also on display in the museum, to travel to the 20th century, intent on becoming a superhero and forming a corporation based around himself to make a comfortable living. He is a shameless self-promoter whose obsession with fame and wealth irritates other heroes.

Carter's nickname as a football player was "Booster", but his chosen 20th century superhero name was "Goldstar". After saving Ronald Reagan, Carter mangled the two names, causing Reagan to introduce him as "Booster Gold". The name stuck. In a running joke throughout the DC Universe, people erroneously call him "Buster", to his chagrin.

=== Celebrity ===
Booster is originally based in Superman's home city, Metropolis. He starts his hero career by preventing the shapeshifting assassin Chiller, an operative of The 1000, from killing the President of the United States and replacing him. With the subsequent public exposure, Booster signs a multitude of commercial and movie deals. During his career, his sister Michelle Carter, powered by a magnetic suit, follows in his footsteps as the superheroine Goldstar. Booster is devastated when she dies battling creatures from another dimension. Amassing a small fortune, Booster founds Goldstar, Inc. (later Booster Gold International) as a holding company and hires Dirk Davis to act as his agent. During the Millennium event, Davis reveals that he is a Manhunter in disguise and that he siphoned money from Booster's accounts in hopes of leaving him no choice but to do the Manhunters' bidding. Although the Manhunters are ultimately defeated, Booster is left bankrupt.

=== Justice League ===
Booster Gold is a key character in the late 1980s/early 1990s Justice League revamp by writers Keith Giffen and J. M. DeMatteis. Booster Gold is frequently partnered with Ted Kord (Blue Beetle), and the two quickly become best friends. The duo's notable appearances include a stint as superhero repo men, and as the minds behind the construction of a gaming resort, Club JLI, on the living island Kooey Kooey Kooey.

After one too many embarrassments and longing for his old reputation, Booster quits the League to found The Conglomerate, a superhero team whose funding is derived from corporate sponsors. Booster and his team are determined to behave as legitimate heroes, but find that their sponsors compromise them far too often. The Conglomerate reforms several times after Booster rejoins the League, though without much success.

When an alien comes to Earth on a rampage, Booster coins the name Doomsday for it. While battling the entity, Booster's costume is destroyed. Ted is able to design a new, bulkier costume to replace it, although this costume often malfunctions. During a later battle with Devastator, a servant of the Overmaster, Booster is nearly killed and loses an arm. Again, Ted comes to his aid, designing a suit that acts as a life support system in addition to replicating the powers of Booster's previous costumes. This suit also includes a cybernetic prosthetic for his lost arm.

=== Extreme Justice ===
After the Justice League falls apart, Booster Gold joins Extreme Justice, a team led by Captain Atom. While a member of this team, Booster makes a deal with the supervillain Monarch who fully heals Booster's wounds so that he can once again remove his battle suit. Booster dons a new costume created by Ted. Skeets acts as its systems controller who aids Booster and is able to take control of the costume if Booster is rendered unconscious.

Following the disbanding of Extreme Justice, this suit is destroyed. Professor Hamilton subsequently creates a new one based on the designs of both the original 25th century costume and the energy containment suit Superman was wearing at this time. This costume is later tweaked to closer resemble Booster's original costume.

=== Countdown to Infinite Crisis: The OMAC Project ===
After the events depicted in the limited series Identity Crisis, in which Sue Dibny is murdered, Booster Gold retires briefly, but then helps Ted discover who is manipulating KORD Industries. Booster is badly injured in an explosion at Kord's home, and it is revealed that his companion Skeets has been dismantled for its 25th century technology by Checkmate.

In The OMAC Project limited series, Booster Gold gathers the old Justice League International heroes to investigate Blue Beetle's disappearance. At the series' end, he is ruined physically and emotionally, having destroyed much of his gear in the fight against the OMACs. He has seen his friend Rocket Red die in battle. He discovered that another friend, Maxwell Lord, is responsible for killing Ted and that in fact, Lord always hated metahumans and superheroes. In a moment of self-reflection, he realizes that if only he had bothered to recall more of what was history in his native era, he might have been able to warn his friends. Giving a farewell kiss to the forehead of his wounded teammate Fire as she lay in a hospital bed, he drops his trademark goggles on the floor and leaves, saying only that he has decided to "go home", implying a return to the 25th century.

=== Infinite Crisis ===
In Infinite Crisis, Gold resurfaces in the ruins of the Justice League Watchtower on the moon, along with Skeets, again branded as a criminal in his time for "hijacking historical records". When Skeets fails to locate the absent Martian Manhunter, Booster searches for Jaime Reyes, the new Blue Beetle, whom he takes to the Batcave. Booster tells Batman the subject of the stolen records: Batman never finds Brother Eye, but Booster implies that, with Jaime's aid, they can succeed. The mission is successful and Booster plays a pivotal role in the destruction of the satellite.

=== 52 and Supernova ===
In the aftermath of Infinite Crisis, Superman, Batman, and Wonder Woman temporarily retire their costumed identities, and the remaining heroes attend a memorial for Superboy in Metropolis after he is killed by Superboy-Prime. Booster attends the memorial, but when Superman, Batman, and Wonder Woman do not arrive as he expects, he suspects his robot sidekick Skeets is malfunctioning and becomes hysterical. After Skeets reports other incorrect historical data, Booster searches fellow time traveler Rip Hunter's desert bunker for answers, finding it littered with enigmatic scrawled notes. Booster finds photos of himself and Skeets surrounded by the words "his fault" with arrows pointing toward them.

=== One Year Later ===
Following the events of 52, Booster Gold returns in his second solo series with the first story arc "52 Pick-Up". Booster puts in a request to the Justice League that they admit him and the group begrudgingly decide to monitor him over the following week. However, Rip Hunter informs Booster that history has become malleable after Mister Mind's rampage and damage to the timeline.

=== Blackest Night ===
In a tie-in to the Blackest Night event, Booster faces Ted Kord who has been reanimated as a Black Lantern. At first unavailable due to reliving Ted's funeral in the past, he returns to meet his ancestor Daniel Carter, only to find the crashed, derelict Bug at his house. Then, he finds Kord pummeling Jaime Reyes, Daniel, and Skeets. Attacked by him, he removes Daniel and Rose from the scene and heads to Kord Industries to arm himself. He uses a special light gun designed by Ted to blast the corpse and separate the ring with light, simulating the emotional spectrum.

Upon separating the corpse from the ring, he collects Ted's remains before the ring can reanimate them and takes them into the Time Sphere to Vanishing Point Fortress to secure them. He is somewhat relieved when Skeets uses the Fortress's special chronal surveillance equipment to display images of the days of Team Blue and Gold. Jaime promises to live up to Kord's legacy and eventually form a new Blue and Gold team. They find evidence at the warehouse of someone else entering, even though the doors were genetically coded, with only two people cleared for access: Ted and Booster.

=== Brightest Day ===
Booster next finds his sister living in Coast City mere hours before its destruction. Though unable to save her boyfriend, Booster and Michelle patch up their relationship, with her agreeing not to leave him. This arc introduces an older Booster Gold, the man that trained Rip Hunter and was the master of both Time, the multiverse, and Hypertime. Rip reveals that this Booster is not only his father, but also has been watching Rip training the young Booster Gold, aiding him when needed. Older Booster also reveals that he is still married to Rip's mother, and that Michelle is with them in some unknown time.

In Justice League: Generation Lost, Booster is part of the manhunt to bring the resurrected Maxwell Lord to justice. He finds Max but is beaten badly. Fire, Ice, and Captain Atom find him just as Lord uses his psychic powers to the utmost to erase all memory of himself from the minds of the entire world. For some reason, Booster, Fire, Ice, and Atom are the only ones who remember Lord and see him in recorded images. Trying to convince Batman (Dick Grayson), Booster is horrified to learn that, thanks to Max, the world believes Ted committed suicide. Fire, Ice, and Captain Atom are soon set up by Max to cut them off from allies, but Booster is left alone because his reputation is already poor.

=== Flashpoint ===
After the Time Masters: Vanishing Point event, Rip Hunter informed them that someone snuck into the JLI base, leaving messages on a chalkboard about the altered timeline. When Earth entered an alternate timeline due to the actions of the Flash, Booster and Skeets awaken and are the only ones who remember the original timeline due to the former's suit protecting them. Gold travels to Coast City, but US soldiers attack him mistaking him to be an Atlantean threat. Skeets is damaged when Gold is attacked by the military's Project Six, which is revealed to be Doomsday.

During the battle in Coast City, he discovers that Doomsday is controlled by General Nathaniel Adam. He escapes from Doomsday and then saves a woman named Alexandra Gianopoulos from Doomsday's attack. He learns the timeline has been changed, suspecting Professor Zoom. Alexandra and Booster split up, but she secretly has powers allowing her to take others' powers and follows him. Later, he flies to Gotham City when Doomsday attacks him. General Adam's control link is destroyed by Alexandra in an attempt to rescue Booster. Doomsday's true personality comes to the surface and he attacks Booster. During the fight, Doomsday beats him nearly to death, but he is rescued by Alexandra. He tries to prevent Doomsday from killing innocent people, and manages to put Doomsday's helmet back on. Doomsday's control is restored to Adam, who grabs Booster, hoping to kill him. Adam takes him back to the base for interrogation, allowing him to escape when the sight of "Project Superman" causes Doomsday's true personality to resurface. Alexandra defeats Doomsday by using the control helmet to make Doomsday tear himself apart, subsequently asking Booster to take her with him when he restores history to normal. Alexandra sacrifices herself to save Booster from an Atlantean attack, leaving him to return to Vanishing Point as history resets without any clear memory of his time in the "Flashpoint" universe. Before the Time Masters: Vanishing Point event, Alexandra appears in the JLI base and leaves messages regarding the altered timeline on the chalkboard before vanishing.

=== The New 52 ===
In The New 52, Booster Gold appears as part of the new Justice League International series. In the Post-Flashpoint continuity, Booster is portrayed with his original glory-seeking personality and is chosen by the U.N. to lead the JLI due to his PR sense and naiveté. He takes his leadership role seriously, and strives to become a better hero and role model. However, despite his best efforts and support from Batman who officially defers to Booster's leadership after supporting Booster for leader, the JLI falls apart due to a string of attacks against the group that leaves members killed or wounded. Despite his best attempts to bring in new members, Booster later watches in horror as the hero OMAC betrays the team and inflicts more carnage, including teleporting Blue Beetle to the homeworld of the Reach.

In the end, Booster is confronted with what appears to be an older version of him, an agent of A.R.G.U.S. who warns his present self to prevent Superman and Wonder Woman from dating. Failure to prevent it, without explanation, would cause Booster Gold to cease existing. As the JLI monitor reveals Superman and Wonder Woman kissing, the future Booster disappears. The present day Booster disappears moments later. A.R.G.U.S. director Amanda Waller orders Chronos to search for the contemporary Booster through time, but Chronos is captured by the Secret Society. The older Booster Gold mysteriously reappears in other timelines, like 19th century Gotham City. In Booster Gold: Futures End #1, the older Booster clarifies he is not an older version of the New 52 Booster, but an older version of him from a universe which no longer exists. The older Booster is sent careening through the timeline, eventually meeting up with his sister Goldstar who is in a version of Metropolis which has been sealed in a bubble by a godlike version of Brainiac from an alternative universe. They are teleported to where the younger, New 52 Booster is held captive by Brainiac. Brainiac threatens to kill Michelle unless the younger Booster gives up the location of Vanishing Point, which he concedes. The older Booster knows this could lead to the end of the multiverse, setting up the events of Convergence.

In the two-part Convergence: Booster Gold, Booster is found by a pre-Flashpoint Rip Hunter on Skartaris, where the older Booster Gold and Goldstar are in prison on the planet Telos, where Brainiac has gathered cities from across the history of the multiverse. The New 52 Booster and Rip release them both. Hunter tells older Booster that he has not traveled through the timeline, but through the cities in the planet which were now chronal anomalies that he was in conflict with, and that his body absorbed so much time travel radiation that he was aging rapidly and dying. The aged pre-Flashpoint Booster transports again, and encounters the Zero Hour Ted Kord. Booster explains to Kord that he has led a good life, married and had a son. Rip, the New 52 Booster and Michelle find him, and Rip forces the New 52 Booster to take his father into the raw chronal field contained at Vanishing Point to cure him; pre-Flashpoint Booster's body is destroyed, but he is reborn as Waverider, an all-knowing cosmic time traveler. Waverider then emerges on Telos in the final issue of Convergence, along with the New 52 Booster and Goldstar to bring back Brainiac, and they convince him to save the multiverse from its imminent destruction. Brainiac then sends the Zero Hour Parallax and pre-Flashpoint Superman to the conclusion of the Crisis on Infinite Earths to avert the original crisis event, restoring the multiverse.

Alternate versions of Booster Gold and Blue Beetle as they were prior to Countdown to Infinite Crisis appear in the pages of Justice League 3000 #14, where they are awakened from a 1,000-year suspended animation on the prison planet Takron-Galtos in the 31st century. According to Keith Giffen, "they're J.M. DeMatteis and my Blue Beetle and Booster Gold".

=== DC Rebirth ===
In 2016, DC Comics implemented a relaunch of its books called "DC Rebirth", which restored its continuity to a form much as it was prior to the New 52. Booster Gold and Skeets return in Action Comics #992.

Later, after traveling through a time rift, Booster Gold absorbed a significant amount of "Omega Energy" and was thrown into a post-apocalyptic future where he was captured and tortured by Darkseid's forces for two years. The Time Trapper, who was working to stop Darkseid's ascendance, directed Superman and Superboy-Prime to this future to save Booster Gold. The two Kryptonians fought the Darkseid Legion, a version of the Legion of Super-Heroes under Darkseid's control, and successfully freed the weakened yet Omega Energy-infused Booster Gold, bringing him back to the present. While it was previously thought that the heroes saved Booster, it is implied that Darkseid had taken his form and infiltrated the heroes' ranks to manipulate the tournament from within and ensure his own victory as "King Omega".

== Other versions ==
- An alternate universe version of Booster Gold appears in I Can't Believe It's Not the Justice League.
- An alternate-universe version of Booster Gold from Earth-22 is an unseen character in the futuristic comic book epic Kingdom Come. However, his younger self appears in the sequel, The Kingdom, where he calls Batman to investigate a potential haunting. This version of Booster Gold is the founder and owner of the Planet Krypton restaurant.
- An alternate universe version of Booster Gold appears in Justice Riders. This version is a traveling mercenary and gambler.
- An alternate timeline version of Booster Gold, Peter Platinum, appears in DC One Million.
- An alternate universe version of Booster Gold appears as a member of the Crime Syndicate of America appears in Countdown to Final Crisis.
- An alternate universe version of Michael Carter appears as the Black Beetle.

== Reception ==
Booster Gold was ranked as the 173rd greatest comic book character of all time by Wizard magazine. IGN also ranked him as the 59th greatest comic book hero.

== In other media ==
=== Television ===
==== Animation ====
- Booster Gold and Skeets appear in Justice League Unlimited, voiced by Tom Everett Scott and Billy West respectively. This version of the duo are members of the Justice League who originate from the year 2462.
- Booster Gold and Skeets make a cameo appearance in the Legion of Super-Heroes episode "Man of Tomorrow" as janitors in a Superman museum.
- Booster Gold and Skeets appear in Batman: The Brave and the Bold, voiced again by Tom Everett Scott and Billy West respectively. This version of the duo are members of Justice League International.
- Booster Gold appears in Teen Titans Go!, voiced by Fred Tatasciore. This version is in a relationship with Ted Kord.
- Booster Gold appears in the Mad segment "That's What Super Friends Are For".
- Booster Gold appears in Robot Chicken DC Comics Special as a member of the Justice League.
- Booster Gold appears in Justice League Action, voiced by Diedrich Bader. This version is a member of the Justice League who was previously married to heiress Margot Montgomery. However, he eventually left her to become a superhero in an attempt to provide for them, with her becoming the villainess Red Velvet to seek revenge. Booster realizes the error of his actions and returns to the future to reconcile with Margot, erasing Red Velvet from existence.

==== Live-action ====
- Booster Gold and Skeets appear in the Smallville episode "Booster", portrayed by Eric Martsolf and voiced by Ross Douglas respectively.
- In November 2011, Syfy ordered a Booster Gold television series, developed by Greg Berlanti and Andrew Kreisberg. While the latter submitted a script in early June 2013, the project never came to fruition.
- Both fans and critics noted similarities between Krypton's version of Adam Strange and Booster Gold, with many outlets considering the former an amalgamation of the two.
- Legends of Tomorrow's executive producers Marc Guggenheim and Phil Klemmer had frequently considered having Booster Gold appear in the series, but he was off-limits for most of the series's run. Due to this, some of Booster's character traits were incorporated into Rip Hunter. Eventually, Donald Faison would portray a variation of Booster Gold in the series finale "Knocked Down, Knocked Up". This version is "Mike", who protects a fixed point in time in 1916. While supposedly agreeing to help the Legends, Mike destroys Gwyn Davies' time machine and hijacks their timeship, the Waverider, to confront his superiors. When the Waverider returns, the Legends find that the Time Police have arrested Mike.
- Booster Gold will appear in a self-titled DC Universe television series for HBO Max.

=== Film ===
- Booster Gold appears in Batman and Harley Quinn, voiced by Bruce Timm. This version is a member of the Justice League.
- Booster Gold makes a non-speaking cameo appearance in Teen Titans Go! To the Movies.

=== Video games ===
- Booster Gold and Skeets appear as non-playable characters in DC Universe Online, voiced by Tracy W. Bush and Shanon Weaver respectively.
- Booster Gold and Skeets appear as character summons in Scribblenauts Unmasked: A DC Comics Adventure.
- Booster Gold and Skeets appear in Lego Batman 3: Beyond Gotham and Lego DC Super-Villains, voiced by Travis Willingham and Roger Craig Smith respectively.
- Booster Gold and Skeets appear in Justice League: Cosmic Chaos, voiced by Alex Bedria and Josh Keaton respectively.

=== Miscellaneous ===
- Booster Gold appears in Smallville Season 11.
- Booster Gold appears in the GraphicAudio radio-play adaptation of 52.
- Booster Gold and Skeets appear in Legion of Super Heroes in the 31st Century #19.
- Booster Gold and Skeets appear in the Injustice 2 prequel comic, with the former serving as a friendly rival to Ted Kord. A year after the fall of High Councilor Superman's Regime, Booster time-travels to the present to warn Kord of his impending death. After Orca and Killer Croc fatally wound Kord, he entrusts Booster with training Jaime Reyes in his stead and bequeaths Kord Industries to him. Later in the series, after Booster is injured while saving Reyes from Starro, he is visited by alternate universe variants of himself and Kord, who stay with him until he dies.
