= Michelle Carter =

Michelle Carter may refer to:

- Michelle Carter (athlete) (born 1985), American shot putter
- Michelle Carter (comics), a DC Comics character
- Michelle Carter (born 1996), American woman convicted of manslaughter in the death of Conrad Roy
- "Michelle Carter", 2021 single by the band SKYND based on the Michelle Carter manslaughter case
