= Plastique (character) =

- Plastique as depicted in Suicide Squad vol. 3 #7 (May 2008). Art by Javier Piña.

Publication information
- Publisher: DC Comics
- First appearance: The Fury of Firestorm #7 (December 1982)
- Created by: Gerry Conway (writer); Pat Broderick (artist)

In-story information
- Alter ego: Bette Sans Souci
- Species: Metahuman
- Team affiliations: Suicide Squad; Bomb Squad; Extreme Justice; Secret Society of Super Villains
- Partnerships: Captain Atom; Electrocutioner
- Abilities: Can project explosive force from her body

Plastique (Bette Sans Souci) is a supervillain appearing in American comic books published by DC Comics. She is an enemy of Firestorm and both an enemy and love interest of Captain Atom.

== Publication history ==
Plastique first appeared in the series The Fury of Firestorm as a terrorist attempting to coerce the separation of Quebec from the rest of Canada. She subsequently makes several appearances during Gerry Conway's tenure as writer of that series. Plastique also appears in Captain Atom as an adversary, later love interest, of the titular hero.

== Fictional character biography ==
=== Firestorm ===
In her first appearance, Plastique attempts to bomb the New York News Express using a set of bombs attached to her costume. However, Firestorm disarms her by vaporizing her clothing, leaving her naked and humiliated in public while Firestorm takes the bombs to explode in a safer area. Later, via genetic engineering, she gains the power to project explosive force outward from her body.

Her last major public operation as a terrorist is depicted in her first Captain Atom appearance, wherein she attempts to destroy the Canadian Parliament Building in Ottawa and the Statue of Liberty in New York City, as well as assassinate the President of the United States and the Canadian Prime Minister. Her plans were thwarted, and Plastique is captured by Captain Atom.

=== Suicide Squad ===
Plastique joins the Suicide Squad for the duration of a single mission. She attempts to betray the team during a field operation in Qurac, but her betrayal was anticipated by the group. Plastique is caught by fellow operative Nemesis and subsequently brainwashed to suppress all memories of her membership in the Squad. Her followers eventually abandon her after becoming disillusioned with the use of force and violence to advance their shared cause, after which Plastique becomes a mercenary. Plastique later reforms, subsequently earning a pardon from the U.S. government and marrying Captain Atom.

Plastique then became engaged to Captain Atom, although the engagement was effectively broken in the wake of events of Armageddon 2001. Following his reappearance in the then-present day, the engagement was renewed. Plastique was invited into the ranks of the Extreme Justice faction of the Justice League. Plastique and Captain Atom later separate, with Plastique returning to the Suicide Squad.

=== One Year Later ===
One year after the events of Infinite Crisis, Signalman informs Black Lightning that Plastique has teamed with the Electrocutioner in a partnership known as the Bomb Squad. Plastique later appeared in the series Checkmate, having returned to the Suicide Squad.

=== The New 52 ===
In The New 52 continuity reboot, Plastique appears as a member of the Secret Society of Super Villains. She later infiltrates A.R.G.U.S. to plant a bomb on Doctor Light's body.

== Powers and abilities ==
Originally Plastique wore a costume covered with plastic explosives, which she could trigger and detonate manually. She has since gained the ability to project explosive force at will by touching an object with her fingertips.

== Other versions ==
A possible future version of Plastique appears in The New 52: Futures End. This version is a thief and mercenary from the year 2020. She crosses paths with Batman (Terry McGinnis), who has traveled back in time to stop a robot apocalypse. After killing Plastique, McGinnis is forced to bring her body with him so the future technology will not fall into anyone's hands. Plastique's future self finds her body, leading her to work with and become romantically involved with McGinnis.

== In other media ==
=== Television ===
- Plastique appears in the Justice League Unlimited episode "Task Force X", voiced by Juliet Landau. This version is an explosives and demolition expert and a member of Task Force X.
- Plastique appears in Smallville, portrayed by Jessica Parker Kennedy. This version is a metahuman and member of the Suicide Squad who was previously kidnapped and held prisoner by LuthorCorp as a child.
- Bette Sans Souci appears in The Flash episode "Plastique", portrayed by Kelly Frye. This version is an EOD specialist for the U.S. Army who gained her abilities from the explosion of S.T.A.R. Labs' particle accelerator. While on the run from Wade Eiling, who intends to weaponize her, Souci encounters the Flash and his allies, who create special gloves to negate her abilities. Souci is later killed while secretly attempting to kill Eiling.
- Plastique appears in the Harley Quinn episode "Harlivy", voiced by Kari Wahlgren. This version is a member of the Suicide Squad. After being kidnapped by Harley Quinn and Poison Ivy, Amanda Waller calls in Plastique to successfully buy her time to escape. Ivy restrains Plastique, who commits suicide via one of her explosives.

=== Film ===
Plastique makes a non-speaking appearance in Injustice.

=== Video games ===
- Plastique appears as a character summon in Scribblenauts Unmasked: A DC Comics Adventure.
- Plastique appears as a playable DLC character in Lego Batman 3: Beyond Gotham.

== Reception ==
The character of Plastique has been portrayed in diverse ways in its various appearances: considered "a classic DC villainess" by Tierney Bricker, "she has flirted with good on occasion". Reviewers Scott Von Doviak, Brianna Reeves and Felix Böhme found Plastique's appearance in The Flash TV series interesting and nuanced, both in comparison to other representations of the character as well as other comic antagonists: she is shown as a victim, but still as a dangerous and uncontrolled force, making how to deal with her a moral conundrum for the team of the titular hero.

Reviewer Rachel Paige commented on the impact of Plastique's changing backstory: she found the idea from the comics, that the character got her supernatural explosive abilities by "some handy genetic engineering" terrifying, but getting her powers from the S.T.A.R. Labs explosion like the Flash from the TV series only mildly so.

Brent Frankenhoff included Plastique in his list of Comics' Sexiest Bad Girls due to the accentuated depiction of her body, while the character was still portrayed with a sense of shame when unclad in public.
