= Justice Riders =

1997 Elseworlds prestige format one-shot

Publication information
- Publisher: DC Comics
- Format: One-shot
- Genre: Superhero
- Publication date: 1997
- No. of issues: 1
- Main character: Justice League

Creative team
- Written by: Chuck Dixon
- Artist: J. H. Williams III

Justice Riders is a 1997 Elseworlds prestige format one-shot, from DC Comics, written by Chuck Dixon, with art by J. H. Williams III.

The story involves the Justice League of America recast in assorted roles in the Wild West. Wonder Woman is a Marshal, Booster Gold is a Maverick-style gambler, and Wally West is an outlaw, wrongly accused of the death of Barry Allen. Ted Kord is an inventor wearing a pair of antennae. Guy Gardner is a Pinkerton detective hunting Flash. Hawkman and Martian Manhunter also appear. There is also a cameo at the end by Clark Kent, as a dime novel writer. Maxwell Lord is the story's villain, predating his evolution into a villain in the main continuity.

== Plot ==
In 1873, US Marshall Diana Prince's hometown, Paradise, is destroyed by Professor Felix Faust, an alcoholic "sorcerer" who also murders Diana's mentor, Sheriff Oberon. She vows to avenge Paradise's townspeople and asks for the help of Wally West, the Kid Flash, a gunslinger with above-average reflexes; and Katar Johnson, a Cheyenne Indian warrior also known as "Hawkman" who utilizes artificial wings. They then set to El Inferno, the headquarters of Faust's employer, railroad baron Maxwell Lord. On their way there, they are attacked by mechanical gunslingers sent by Lord and saved by Michael Carter, the Booster Gold, a mercenary outfitted with powerful guns devised by an eccentric inventor, Ted Kord. They agree to join Diana in their quest.

As they near El Inferno, the Justice Riders are joined by J'onn Jones, an old friend of Diana's and an alien searching for Lord's "secret weapon". They are followed by Guy Gardner, a Pinkerton Agency private investigator who wants to arrest Kid Flash for the death of a lawman called Barry Allen. Upon arriving at El Inferno, the Justice Riders face off against Lord, Faust and their mechanical soldiers. Diana, Hawkman, Jones and Kid Flash destroy the robots while Booster Gold and Blue Beetle fight Gardner. Suddenly, they are attacked by Lord, piloting a powerful war machine called the Lordevastator.

El Inferno is nearly destroyed in the battle, but Diana manages to destroy the Lordevastator. Lord claims that he is Earth's rightful heir and reveals that he has been destroying several small towns such as Paradise to open way for a railroad that will allow Lord to transport his war machines to strategic points of the United States and slowly take over Earth. Diana kills him while Kid Flash and Gardner, who were fighting each other, briefly team-up to shoot Faust, who tried to kill them with a shotgun. Gardner agrees to allow Kid Flash to escape this one time, but vows that he will capture him eventually before riding off. Kid Flash decides to hide in Mexico, while Hawkman returns to the Indian reserve where he lives and Jones uncovers the source of Lord's advanced technology: a Dominion alien trapped in a cage. He decides to return the being to its homeworld, while Diana returns to Paradise intending to rebuild it and Booster Gold searches for new jobs in Alabama. Blue Beetle returns to his old town and sells the story to dime writer Clark Kent in order to use the money to finance his inventions.

The Justice Riders ride together into the sunset one last time. In the ruins of Paradise, Faust rises from the death once more, revealing himself to be a supernatural being.

== Earth-18 ==
This world is part of the new post-Infinite Crisis (2005) Multiverse, designated Earth-18. It is visited again in DC's Convergence (2015) crossover, where evil versions of Hawkman and Hawkwoman from Flashpoint (2011) attack its heroes.

== Publication ==
- Justice Riders (by Chuck Dixon and J. H. Williams III, DC Comics, 63 pages, January 1997, ISBN 1-56389-257-X)

== In other media ==
Earth-18 appears in the Arrowverse crossover event, "Crisis on Infinite Earths". This Earth is home to an alternate version of Jonah Hex, who has gained immortality through the use of a Lazarus pit.

== See also ==
- List of Elseworlds publications
- Weird West
