= Ted Kord =

Ted Kord Blue Beetle
- Ted Kord as the Blue Beetle taken from the cover of Blue Beetle #1 (April 1986). Art by Paris Cullins.

Publication information
- Publisher: Charlton Comics; DC Comics
- First appearance: Captain Atom #83 (November 1966)
- Created by: Steve Ditko

In-story information
- Full name: Theodore Stephen "Ted" Kord
- Species: Human
- Team affiliations: Justice League International; L.A.W. Kord Enterprises; Justice League; Extreme Justice; Black Lantern Corps
- Partnerships: Booster Gold; Green Lantern; The Question; Jaime Reyes
- Abilities: Genius-level intellect; Excellent athlete, acrobat, and hand-to-hand combatant; Possesses advanced weapons and equipment; Highly skilled spy, pilot

Theodore Stephen "Ted" Kord (Note: In many stories and character entries, it is noted that "Ted" is an abbreviated form of "Theodore", but in Chuck Dixon's Birds of Prey, Barbara Gordon states that "Ted" is short for "Edward". In Countdown to Infinite Crisis, the wizard Shazam repeatedly addresses Ted as "Theodore Kord"; and Checkmate's profile of Blue Beetle also lists him as such.) is a superhero who was the second incarnation of Blue Beetle, originally published by Charlton Comics and later acquired by DC Comics. He was created by Steve Ditko and first appeared as a back-up feature in Captain Atom #83 (November 1966), with Gary Friedrich scripting from Ditko's conception and plot.

Since his debut in the comics, Kord has made appearances in numerous media. He is voiced by Wil Wheaton in Batman: The Brave and the Bold and Matt Lanter in the Tomorrowverse.

== Publication history and fictional character biography ==
=== Charlton Comics ===
Ted Kord was a genius-level inventor and a gifted athlete, sharing much more in common with Dan Garret, the Fox Feature Syndicate original, than did Charlton's reimagining of the Garrett (a second "t" was added) / Blue Beetle character. Kord's signature equipment was his bug-shaped personal aircraft, which he entered and exited typically with a cable suspended from the cockpit. He also generally eschewed personal weaponry, except for a pistol that made a blinding flash of light and, additionally, a strong airblast to gain the advantage when he closed in for hand-to-hand combat.

The character ran as a backup feature in Captain Atom #83–86 (November 1966 – June 1967) before getting his own Blue Beetle title, which ran for 5 issues between June 1967 and November 1968. A sixth issue was produced, but published in the Charlton Portfolio by CPL Gang. The Question ran as a backup series, with the fifth issue featuring a quasi-team-up in which the Blue Beetle story continues in part in the Question tale.

An origin was given in Secret Origins vol. 2, #2, linking him to the original Blue Beetle. Ted was a former student of Dan Garrett, and they were investigating his uncle Jarvis Kord, learning Jarvis was working to create an army of androids to take over Earth; Garrett fought Jarvis, but both were killed in the battle. Garrett died and passed on the responsibility of the alter-ego to Ted, but was not able to pass on the mystical Blue Beetle scarab (a convenient means for Ditko to explain his preference for a power-free character). There was a hint that one android was still left in stasis, but this would remain unresolved until the DC series of the late 1980s.

In the early 1980s, the first issue of Charlton's anthology comic Charlton Bullseye featured a team-up of the Blue Beetle and the Question. Later, AC Comics would publish a story intended for Charlton Bullseye in Americomics #3, and a one-shot of a team-up of all the Charlton "Action Heroes" called the Sentinels of Justice, as the company called its lineup. Upon losing Blue Beetle, AC Comics created a similar character called Scarlet Scorpion.

=== DC Comics ===
==== DC solo series ====
Cover to Secret Origins #2, art by Gil Kane.

DC Comics acquired the Charlton heroes in the mid-1980s and used the Crisis on Infinite Earths crossover event to integrate them all into the DC Universe. During this period, Ted Kord had his own Blue Beetle series, written by Len Wein, which ran for 24 issues from June 1986 to May 1988. Also published during this time was Secret Origins #2 (cover illustrated by Gil Kane), which explained the origins and careers of the Ted Kord and Dan Garrett Blue Beetles in post-Crisis continuity. They would also follow up on the hinted android in stasis from the Charlton series, which would eventually become "Carapax, the Indestructible Man".

In his monthly, solo series, Kord was shown as an industrialist, the owner of KORD Industries, which he took over from his father Thomas Kord and transformed it from a small R&D company to a scientific industry rivaling S.T.A.R. Labs. Upon joining the newly formed Justice League (following the events in the Legends) Ted was more often portrayed as a second string joke. He was short on money, leading to his entering "get-rich-quick" schemes with Booster Gold. A brief appearance in JLA: Year One showed the young Ted working in Kord Industries R&D, where he designed the JLA HQ security system. Upon meeting the heroes, he thought, "Screw the family business. I want to be one of those guys", possibly explaining the company's fluctuating status since he took over.

==== Joining the Justice League ====
JLI #8 (December 1987), art by Kevin Maguire (pencils) and Al Gordon (inks).

Kord is probably best known as the wisecracking Blue Beetle of Keith Giffen and J. M. DeMatteis' lighthearted, five-year run on various Justice League of America titles (notably Justice League International), where he was memorably partnered with Booster Gold, and the two become best friends. Among fans, they are known collectively as the "Blue and Gold" team. After Giffen and DeMatteis left, the series continued to run until Justice League America #113. Dan Jurgens tied "The Death of Superman" storyline into JLA, in which Doomsday left Kord in a coma during his murderous rampage, as well as a six-inch scar on the back of his skull. Kord and Booster Gold both subsequently joined the short-lived Justice League offshoot known as Extreme Justice.

Kord then entered a period of relative obscurity. The miniseries LAW (Living Assault Weapons) reunited him and the other heroes acquired from Charlton, but the series met with critical disfavor.

==== Super Buddies ====
In July 2003, Giffen, DeMatteis, and original JLI artist Kevin Maguire reunited for the six-issue miniseries Formerly Known as the Justice League, where many of the original JLI characters re-teamed with a storefront office. Ted (who had grown in maturity) was an important member of this new team known as the "Super Buddies". The sequel story arc I Can't Believe It's Not the Justice League was initially slated as a second miniseries, but instead ran delayed in JLA: Classified #4–9 (2005).

Ted made several appearances in Birds of Prey, at first as Oracle's internet friend and later in person. It was hinted in several issues that Ted had a crush on Oracle. Ted had gone back to his company, but still had many, many problems with it; problems Oracle tried to help resolve. During this time, it was revealed he had a heart condition (where he had actually experienced multiple heart attacks while in action without noticing), but this did not stop him from assisting when it was needed. After his death, the Birds of Prey visited a statue in Valhalla Cemetery built in his honor; Black Canary revealed that being in the JLA was only fun when Ted was there, and Oracle revealed having had a cyber crush on him.

=== Death and return ===
Ted Kord shot by Maxwell Lord, art by Phil Jimenez.

In Countdown to Infinite Crisis, Kord discovers a revived Checkmate organization headquartered in a Belgian castle fortress where Kord is captured. Maxwell Lord, former bankroller of the JLA, reveals to Blue Beetle a plan to use Checkmate to ensure that metahumans, including superheroes, will be kept under human's surveillance and control. Blue Beetle is then given an ultimatum to join Lord's organization, but refuses with the reply "Rot in hell, Max" to which Lord murders him with a bullet to the head.

That same story had earlier reiterated that Kord had thought the scarab was destroyed back in Blue Beetle vol. 6. #18 (1987); however, it had been rediscovered, untouched, in a temple in Egypt and handed over to Kord. It is unclear as to whether or not this is the same scarab created from a piece of future technology magically infused by Nabu in the Time Masters miniseries. Shazam took the scarab upon encountering Kord, fueling speculation about the possibility of the character's return in Infinite Crisis. At the Wizard World convention, writer Greg Rucka stated that Kord would not be resurrected.

=== One Year Later ===
During Infinite Crisis, Jaime Reyes obtains Kord's scarab and becomes the new Blue Beetle. A statue of Kord is displayed in a memorial to fallen Justice League members. When recruiting members for the new Justice League, Superman suggests Booster Gold to which Batman responds: "There are better ways to honor Ted".

In Geoff Johns' 2007/2008 ongoing Booster Gold series, Booster Gold agrees to help Rip Hunter set right the timeline, but at a cost: Rip must help Booster travel back in time and save Ted Kord. Hunter tries to shock Booster into acknowledging the inability to change the past. As Booster prepares to accept this fate, a futuristic Blue Beetle appears with Dan Garrett and Jaime Reyes in tow to show how to turn the time around Kord's death into "malleable time". Booster betrays Hunter and rescues Kord from death. The story arc "Blue and Gold" reveals that this act has altered the present, creating a timeline where Maxwell Lord rules over Earth as a police state. The future Blue Beetle is revealed to be the supervillain Black Beetle. Facing the defeat of his former JLI teammates (the only free heroes in the new timeline), Kord returns to the past and allows himself to die to restore the timeline.

=== Blackest Night ===
Ted Kord as a Black Lantern, art by Dan Jurgens.

During the "Blackest Night" event, Kord is revived as a Black Lantern and lures Booster Gold into the open by targeting Daniel Carter (Supernova) and Rose Levin, Booster's 21st-century ancestor. He is able to successfully pierce the Supernova costume shields with his gun, and holds Supernova in place while beating Blue Beetle (Jaime Reyes) and staving off Skeets' attack until Booster arrives. He then moves in for the kill, hoping to rip out Booster's heart.

Kord battles all of the heroes, but is unsuccessful in killing anyone except a neighbor who complained about the noise from the fight. Jaime and Booster Gold remove Rose and Daniel from the scene and head to a KORD Industries warehouse where one of Kord's hidden bases is located to collect special equipment to fight the Black Lantern. Booster discovers that even though the doors were genetically coded, someone had accessed Kord's hidden base a few months before his remains were reanimated. However to Booster's knowledge, only two people, had authorization to access it: Booster Gold and Kord himself. Kord corpse battles Booster until he is attacked by a light blast from a gun designed by Kord to access the emotional spectrum. Kord is separated from the ring, leaving his body inanimate. Booster seizes his remains before the ring can reanimate them, takes them into the Time Sphere, and deposits them in a small grave at the Vanishing Point.

=== The New 52 ===
Following DC's 2011 relaunch of its properties as part of its The New 52 publishing event, Ted Kord is not mentioned in comics until 2014, when he is reintroduced in the final pages of Forever Evil, DC's company-wide crossover event. At the beginning of the story, Lex Luthor threatens the owner of Kord Industries, Thomas Kord, and his entire family and company, as part of a plan to acquire the company but the helicopter loses control, and crashes into the side of LexCorp Tower. Lex later undergoes a change of heart after finding a message appearing on his phone's screen from the Crime Syndicate: "THIS WORLD IS OURS". Lex looks up to see that Thomas Kord is still alive, but dangling precariously from the helicopter's wreckage over a sheer drop to the street. He tries to save him but Ultraman accidentally causes Kord to fall to his death. Lex Luthor later promises Ted Kord (depicted as a grad student) that he will not be acquiring Kord Industries despite Ted's desire to sell it to him. Lex compliments Ted on his genius with nanotechnology and offers him his assistance should he ever need it again. Ted thanks Lex and praises him for living up to his reputation for benevolence.

=== DC Rebirth ===
In DC Universe: Rebirth, Ted Kord is the owner of Kord Industries, where he makes and designs technologies. After Jaime Reyes approaches Kord for help to get rid of the Scarab, Kord is trying to figure out what the Scarab can do and help as many people in the process. Kord is warned by Doctor Fate that he does not know what he is dealing with, as the Scarab is magical in nature. Kord is established to have been Blue Beetle some time in the past, having worked alongside other heroes such as Nightshade.

During the Dark Nights: Death Metal storyline, Blue Beetle is among the prisoners in Apokolips after The Batman Who Laughs and his Dark Knights take over Earth. They are freed when Wonder Woman, Batman, and Harley Quinn freed Superman from the control of Darkfather. During the heroes' fight with Robin King, Blue Beetle accompanies Red Tornado and Blue Beetle into battle against Robin King. Robin King summons a giant beetle which kills Blue Beetle. Batman later resurrects Blue Beetle using a Black Lantern ring.

== Hardcover collection ==
Nearly all of Ted Kord's Charlton Comics appearances as Blue Beetle have been collected as part of the DC Archive Editions series.

Title	Material collected	Publication date	ISBN
The Action Heroes Archives, Vol. 2	Captain Atom #83–89; Blue Beetle vol. 5, #1–5; Charlton Portfolio #9–10 (written for and presented as Blue Beetle #6)	May 2007	978-1401213466

The Charlton Portfolio material is in black and white as originally presented, while the rest is in color. The collection includes nearly all of the Charlton appearances of the Question, as well as a brief appearance by Captain Atom. Volume 1 of the archive contained nearly all of Captain Atom's Charlton stories and a brief appearance by Nightshade.

== Powers and abilities ==
Ted Kord has no superpowers; he possesses a genius-level intellect, with an IQ of 192. He is proficient in numerous sciences such as physics, chemistry, computer science, genetics, mechanical engineering, and aerospace engineering. He additionally has a comprehensive understanding of extraterrestrial technology. Despero once claimed that Ted's mind was second only to that of the Martian Manhunter. Former Justice League teammate Guy Gardner claims that Ted is smarter than Batman, "although nobody ever noticed". Kord is an Olympic-level acrobat and skilled hand-to-hand combatant, having studied in the martial arts of karate and aikido. Dick Grayson stated that Ted is very adept physically, to the point where he is almost ambidextrous.

=== Equipment ===
- Kord created numerous gadgets, including suction pads, sight-enhancing lenses, and a protective costume. To prevent being forcibly unmasked, especially if rendered unconscious, Kord's cowl had a lock mechanism that only opened when he touched the mask under his jaw with a chip in his glove, which would at least force an enemy to perform the more troublesome task of cutting through the material to unmask him.
- He also created a power armor suit for his friend Booster Gold. The suit contained a fully functioning artificial arm and also provided life-support for Booster as he recovered from potentially fatal injuries. He later converted a suit of alien power armor for Booster to use.
- His BB gun was a handheld weapon that could blind villains with a flash of light, or knock them back with a compressed air blast capable of felling a charging rhino. The original BB gun was designed with a security feature so that it would function only when the Blue Beetle held it, becoming inactive without contact with special circuitry in the Beetle costume's gloves. The BB gun is solar powered.
- Blue Beetle's airship, the "Bug", contained high tech equipment, could electrify or magnetize its hull, fire electrical energy, and fly at 600 mph. All models had booster jets hidden under the shell of the Bug. The boosters on the first two models could speed the Bug up to the speed of sound for a short period of time; no time limit was ever given for how long the burst lasted. Later models of the boosters were used for intercontinental travel at supersonic speed. It was also 90% solar powered. Later models also had energy weapons of various types, from lasers to plasma. The last two models were capable of reaching orbit and all models could operate underwater. No depth was ever given that they could go to, but one model Bug was seen operating on the sea floor after going through an underwater volcano. All models were remotely controllable from controls built into Kord's gloves.
- He also built flight pads similar to Mister Miracle's flight discs used throughout the entire Extreme Justice run and claimed to Barbara Gordon that he could keep the Birds of Prey jet flying 24-7 with technology based on the New Gods' Mother Boxes.
- As a Black Lantern, Blue Beetle is equipped with a "decayed", damaged version of the Bug, and black, power ring-derived constructs of his Blue Beetle suit and his BB gun. This iteration of the BB gun is an aggressive, rather than a defensive, weapon, able to pierce the powerful shields in the Supernova suit.

== Other versions ==
- Ted Kord appears in Kingdom Come as one of Batman's generals who wields the Blue Beetle scarab and knight-like armor.
- A Wild West-inspired variant of Ted Kord appears in Justice Riders as an inventor who teams up with Booster Gold.
- A future variant of Ted Kord appears in Justice League America Annual #5. Having allowed his health and business ventures to fall apart and sold the rights to his name, he suffers a psychotic breakdown and attacks his former team.
- An Earth-3 variant of Ted Kord appears in Countdown to Final Crisis.
  - Several alternative variants of Ted appear in Countdown: Arena, most prominently an anthropomorphic blue beetle named Ted who serves as the pet of Mr. Kord and Mrs. Kord from Earth-33 who is forced to fight for a role in the Monarch's army, during which the latter kills him.

== In other media ==
=== Television ===
Sebastian Spence as Ted Kord in Smallville.

- Ted Kord appears in the Smallville episode "Booster", portrayed by Sebastian Spence. This version did not take up the Blue Beetle mantle from Dan Garrett who had died after failing to control the scarab. Kord attempts to use the device for good, but it bonds to Jaime Reyes. After Kord hires Booster Gold to help him find the scarab and locates Reyes, he agrees to help the latter control the scarab's powers.
- Ted Kord / Blue Beetle appears in Batman: The Brave and the Bold, voiced by Wil Wheaton. This version was the owner of K.O.R.D. Industries who was close friends with Batman and Booster Gold before sacrificing himself to stop his villainous uncle from obtaining the scarab, which eventually came into Jaime Reyes' possession.
- Ted Kord / Blue Beetle appears in Teen Titans Go!, voiced by Jess Harnell. This version is Booster Gold's boyfriend.
- Ted Kord / Blue Beetle makes non-speaking appearances in Young Justice. This version was a member of the Justice League who recognized the Scarab's potential dangers and chose to rely on his inventions instead. Sometime prior to the second season, Kord was attacked by Deathstroke and Sportsmaster and sacrificed himself to prevent the two from obtaining the Scarab.
- Ted Kord / Blue Beetle appears in DC Super Hero Girls, voiced by Max Mittelman.

=== Film ===
- Ted Kord / Blue Beetle makes a cameo appearance in Teen Titans Go! To the Movies.
- Ted Kord / Blue Beetle appears in DC Showcase: Blue Beetle, voiced by Matt Lanter.
- Ted Kord / Blue Beetle appears in Teen Titans Go! & DC Super Hero Girls: Mayhem in the Multiverse.
- Ted Kord makes a vocal cameo appearance in the mid-credits scene of Blue Beetle, voiced by Bobby McGruther. This version was previously based in Palmera City before disappearing sometime prior to the film, leaving behind an older sister and daughter.
- Ted Kord / Blue Beetle appears in Justice League: Crisis on Infinite Earths, voiced again by Matt Lanter.

=== Video games ===
Ted Kord / Blue Beetle appears as a character summon in Scribblenauts Unmasked: A DC Comics Adventure.

=== Miscellaneous ===
- Ted Kord / Blue Beetle appears in Adventures in the DC Universe #8.
- Ted Kord / Blue Beetle appears in Justice League Unlimited.
- Ted Kord appears in Injustice 2. This version is Jaime Reyes' mentor and a participant in Batman's efforts to rebuild the world following the fall of High Councilor Superman's Regime. After Booster Gold informs him of his impending death, Kord reassumes the Blue Beetle mantle, but is attacked and abducted by the League of Assassins, who task Killer Croc and Orca with murdering him and other industrialists whose businesses have negatively impacted the environment on live television. Via a holographic message, Kord bequeaths Kord Industries to Booster and entrusts him to continue training Reyes. Additionally, an alternate universe variant of Kord arrives to spend time with a dying Booster.

== Reception ==
This version of Blue Beetle has been ranked as the 61st-greatest comic book character of all time. An IGN ranking stated that his intelligence, his "bwahahha" antics, his endearing partnership with Booster Gold, and his brave sacrifice during the build-up to Infinite Crisis all serve to cement his legacy.
