= Extreme Justice =

DC Comics series

- Extreme Justice #0, art by Marc Campos.

Publication information
- Publisher: DC Comics
- Schedule: Monthly
- Format: Ongoing series
- Publication date: January 1995 – July 1996
- No. of issues: 19 (18 plus issue #0)

Creative team
- Created by: Dan Vado; Marc Campos
- Written by: Various
- Artist(s): Various

Extreme Justice is a monthly Justice League spin-off title in the DC Comics universe. It replaced the cancelled Justice League International (formerly Justice League Europe) and ran for nineteen issues from 1994 to 1996.

== Overview ==
Several heroes split from the main Justice League over dissatisfaction with the League's association with the United Nations. These characters form their own Justice League, based in Mount Thunder, Colorado. The team is led by Captain Atom and consists of Maxima, Blue Beetle (Ted Kord), Booster Gold, and Amazing-Man (Will Everett III). They are later joined by Firestorm (Ronnie Raymond), Plastique, and the Wonder Twins (Zan and Jayna). Carol Ferris becomes the administrator of the Mount Thunder facility. The characters never refer to the team as "Extreme Justice" in the series; they are called that in an issue of Justice League America.

Although at one point there are three Justice League groups in action (Extreme Justice, Justice League America, and Justice League Task Force), there is little unity between the teams and a strong sense of rivalry among the respective leaders, Captain Atom, Wonder Woman, and Martian Manhunter.

Captain Atom leads the team in an invasion of Bialya. This is when the current ruler, Queen Beatriz, is rebuilding the Extremists. Most of Extreme Justice, having lost friends to the group before, do not want to tolerate the existence of these entities. They invade the country and destroy what they think are robots, but are in fact cyborgs created from of the Queen's subjects. They allegedly volunteered, a whole army's worth, but Captain Atom destroys all the facilities and threatens worse if Beatriz continues. This particular incident is the last straw and all versions of the Justice League are disbanded.

In summer 1996, all three Justice League series were cancelled and replaced by an ongoing monthly titled JLA.
