= Hank Hall =

DC comics superhero

- Textless cover of Hawk & Dove #5 (March 2012), art by Rob Liefeld

Publication information
- Publisher: DC Comics
- First appearance: As the Hawk: Showcase #75 (June 1968); As Monarch: Armageddon 2001 #1 (May 1991); As Extant: Zero Hour: Crisis in Time! #4 (September 1994)
- Created by: Steve Ditko; Steve Skeates

In-story information
- Alter ego: Henry Hall
- Species: Metahuman
- Team affiliations: The Hawk and the Dove; Teen Titans; Black Lantern Corps; Birds of Prey; Justice League
- Notable aliases: The Hawk, Extant, Monarch
- Abilities: The Hawk: Superhuman strength, durability, stamina, speed, agility and reflexes Enhanced body density, healing factor and invulnerability Extant: Time travel Chronokinesis; Energy blasts Flight; Omniscience

Henry Hall is a fictional character that appears in American comic books published by DC Comics. He first appeared in Showcase #75 (June 1968) as the Hawk of the Hawk and the Dove. After that, he became known as Extant, and appeared in the limited series Zero Hour: Crisis in Time, as well as some related tie-ins. Long after that, he became the supervillain Monarch in the crossover event limited series Armageddon 2001. The Hawk has appeared in numerous television shows and films. He appeared in his first live action adaptation in the television series Titans, played by Alan Ritchson in the first, second, and third seasons.

== Publication history ==
The character first appeared in Showcase #75 (June 1968), created by Steve Ditko and Steve Skeates. He later appeared as Monarch in Armageddon 2001 #1 (May 1991), created by Archie Goodwin, Denny O'Neil, and Dan Jurgens, and as Extant in Zero Hour: Crisis in Time #4 (September 1994), created by Jurgens.

== Fictional character biography ==
=== The Hawk and the Dove ===
Hank Hall is originally the superhero Hawk of the superhero duo the Hawk and the Dove. The Hawk represents "chaos", while the Dove represents "order". His brother Don Hall dies during Crisis on Infinite Earths and is replaced with Dawn Granger.

=== Armageddon 2001: Monarch ===
Monarch is an oppressive tyrant from a bleak dystopian Earth 50 years in the future. The people are unhappy with his rule, particularly scientist Matthew Ryder, an expert on temporal studies, who is convinced he can use his technology to travel back in time and prevent Monarch from ever coming to power. He learns that 40 years ago, one of Earth's strongest and most powerful heroes eventually turns evil and becomes Monarch, and 10 years from that event he conquers the world. During a time travel experiment, Matthew is transformed into a being called "Waverider", and begins searching the timestream for the hero who becomes Monarch. Monarch follows him and comes into battle with the heroes of the present day. In the ensuing battle, he kills the Dove, and her enraged partner kills him for it. Removing the villain's mask, Hank discovers that he is Monarch, and dons the armor.

The reveal of Hank Hall as Monarch led to some controversy among the fan community; Monarch was originally intended to be revealed as Captain Atom, with clues in the story pointing towards this which had to be discarded when it was changed at the last minute. This change was due to the premature leaking of Monarch's identity. While Monarch was always supposed to be Captain Atom, this was supposed to be a secret. When Monarch's identity was prematurely leaked, DC decided to preserve the surprise of the story by switching Monarch's identity to that of Hall.

=== Armageddon: The Alien Agenda ===
When hostile aliens encounter Monarch and Captain Atom in the past (sometime between 230 and 65 million years ago), they attempt to enlist both (with each figure having no knowledge of the other involved) to assist them in creating a wormhole. The wormhole's creation would destroy the universe in which the primitive Earth existed, but would allow the aliens to travel freely.

=== Zero Hour: Extant ===
Hank Hall as Extant during Zero Hour, art by Eric Battle

Shortly after returning to the present, Monarch confronts Waverider and uses his power to see the past and future, becoming aware of the power within him. It is explained at this point that when Monarch killed the Dove, her powers went directly into the Hawk. Realizing this, Monarch unleashes his hidden powers and becomes Extant. Extant removes Waverider's time travel device and joins forces with renegade Green Lantern Hal Jordan, now known as Parallax, to alter time as they see fit.

His first act is to alter the future so that he can have a metahuman army at his disposal, mostly consisting of members of the Teen Titans; his plan is to amass an army so powerful that no one can interfere with his efforts to control time itself. Several armies of heroes band together to stop his plans before they began in the 30th century, and alter history so that his followers never come to exist in the future.

Down, but not out, Extant begins to strike back at the heroes at Ground Zero, the beginning of time. Parallax gathers metahumans from various time periods for the ultimate assault, and Extant hits the Atom with a chronal blast, de-aging him into a teenager. Sensing defeat is imminent, he escapes the fight, promising vengeance at a later date.

Extant first reappears in the 1999 one-shot "Impulse: Bart Saves the Universe". In it, Extant picks a fight with the original Justice Society as a means of tricking the Linear Men into saving the life of an innocent bystander who was destined to die. The man they saved would now go on to develop a nuclear weapon that, when tested, would shift the Earth out of its proper orbit, causing massive changes in the timelines of some of Earth's greatest heroes. Among these changes, Hal Jordan never becomes Green Lantern, thus he never becomes Parallax, and never stops Extant from destroying all of time. Impulse stops Extant and prevents the Linear Men from saving the doomed scientist.

He engages the Justice Society again on a later date as he seeks to acquire the reality-warping power of the Worlogog, recently dismantled by Hourman, who fears its power. Although Extant succeeds in his goal with the aid of Metron's stolen Mobius Chair, Doctor Fate learns from the imprisoned Mordru that when the Hourman dismantled the Worlogog, he retained a small fragment of it, thus creating an infinitesimal flaw that the JSA can exploit.

After the resurrected Dove sacrifices herself to distract Extant, the Hourman divides his powers amongst his teammates, granting them all immunity to Extant's reality-warping powers for four minutes and enabling them to separate him from the Worlogog. Following this setback, Extant again attempts to escape. Instead, he is teleported by Hourman and Metron, at the Atom Smasher's behest, into the seat of an airplane whose crash Kobra caused earlier in the timestream. The Atom Smasher's mother originally died on the plane that day, but he replaces her with a weakened Extant, saving her life and killing Extant.

=== The Hawk restored ===
In response to fan-criticism of Armageddon 2001, many of whose readers felt that the character of the Hawk had been severely misused in the story's last-minute changes, DC Comics set about restoring the character as he had originally been intended: a hero. DC retconned Extant's portion of Hank Hall's timeline in issue #14 of JSA, dated September 2000, in which Metron announced his intention to erase the villain's timeline. This was the second issue of a three-part story entitled The Hunt for Extant! (the details of which are listed above). After this, DC also retcons Monarch's portion of Hall's timeline with the final issue of the six-issue miniseries The Battle for Blüdhaven, dated September 2006, which now depicts Captain Atom's transformation into Monarch, as had been DC's original intention back in 1991. The Hawk is restored, but he is not revived until the last issue of Blackest Night.

=== Blackest Night ===
Hank Hall as the resurrected White Lantern version of the Hawk from Birds of Prey #4, art by Ryan Sook

In Blackest Night, Hank Hall returns as a member of the Black Lantern Corps. The black power rings also try to reanimate his brother Don, but are denied as he is at peace in death and unable to be resurrected. Hank then tracks down and attacks Dawn and the new Hawk (Holly Granger). After a short battle, Hank kills Holly by ripping her heart out. Holly's body is then revived by a Black Lantern and attacks Dawn. Severely outmatched, Dawn retreats, with Hank and Holly giving chase. Hank and Holly follow Dawn to Titans Tower, where the Black Lanterns are attacking the living heroes. Dawn suddenly radiates a white energy that destroys Holly and several other Black Lanterns. While battling the Black Lanterns at Coast City, Hank is fully resurrected by the white light. Dawn has a vision of Don who tells Dawn that she can save Hank, and to not give up on him.

=== Brightest Day/Birds of Prey ===
At the beginning of the Brightest Day event, Hank and Dawn begin working together again as a crime-fighting duo. Dawn expresses worries over Hank's increasingly violent demeanor, but he simply brushes off her concerns. While stopping an army of powerful teenaged supervillains in Gotham City, Hank and Dawn are invited by Zinda Blake to join the Birds of Prey. The two are immediately called by the Oracle to help the Black Canary and the Huntress during their battle with a dangerous villainess known as the White Canary. The Dove attempts to defeat her herself, but is surprised when the White Canary is somehow able to dodge her attack and then draw blood from her. Hank and Dawn later encounter Deadman, who Hank asks to resurrect Don. In Silver City, New Mexico, Deadman attempts to revive Don, only to be prevented from doing so by the Life Entity. As a number of onlookers (including Jackson Hyde) watch the Entity speak to the heroes, it instructs Hank to catch the boomerang that Captain Boomerang will throw at the Dove.

After being injured by the Penguin, Hank is sent to a hospital while his teammates plan their next move. During his hospital stay, Hank has a vision of himself, clad in a White Lantern uniform and talking to Don. Just before the dream ends, Don assures his brother that he is at peace. Later, Dawn is transported to the Star City forest by the Entity. The Hawk unintentionally went with her, but when the "dark avatar" made his presence known, the Entity tells them that they must protect the forest and withstand the ultimate savior, which is Alec Holland.

== Powers and abilities ==
As the Hawk he possesses a "danger sense transformation" which allows him to change into a superhuman with the powers of super-strength, unlimited stamina, enhanced speed, increased agility, enhanced body density, extreme durability and healing factor.

His partner the Dove suppresses his violent nature, and without her Hank's rage becomes boundless.

As Monarch he possesses the same powers that he had as the Hawk, along with a suit of highly durable armor that is crafted using advanced technology.

As Extant, he has the powers of chronokinesis, energy projection, flight, and omniscience. After piecing together the Worlogog, he becomes nigh-omnipotent.

As a Black Lantern, Hank wields a black power ring which allows him to generate black energy constructs. He is also able to perceive emotional auras. Whilst he is able to perceive Holly's aura as red for rage, he sees Dawn's as a pure white that his ring cannot identify. While wearing the black power ring, it lowers his original power by over 50%.

== Other versions ==
- An alternate universe version of Hank Hall / the Hawk appears in JLA: The Nail.
- An alternate universe version of Hank Hall / the Hawk from a reality created by Anansi appears in Justice League of America (vol. 2) #26.

== In other media ==
=== Television ===
- Hank Hall as the Hawk appears in Justice League Unlimited, voiced by Fred Savage. This version is a member of the Justice League.
- Hank Hall as the Hawk appears in Batman: The Brave and the Bold, voiced by Greg Ellis.
- Hank Hall as the Hawk appears in Titans, portrayed by Alan Ritchson and by Tait Blum as a young adult. This version is a former football player and half-brother of Don Hall / the Dove, with the two operating as the original version of the Hawk and the Dove to hunt down sexual predators. After Don and Dawn's mother, Marie, is killed in an accident, Hank and Dawn Granger gradually enter a relationship, with Dawn subsequently becoming the new Dove using the physical abuse she and Marie suffered at the hands of the former's father as motivation. The new duo go on to meet and team up with Dick Grayson and the Titans, though tensions occur when Grayson and Dawn enter a romantic relationship. While planning on retiring, Hank and Dawn cross paths with Grayson again when he requests their help in protecting Rachel Roth. This leads to Hank, Dawn, and Grayson being attacked by the Nuclear Family, who were hired to retrieve Roth, and Dawn ending up in a coma due to injuries sustained in the ensuing fight. Dawn eventually awakens when she receives a vision from Roth, telling her and Hank to find Jason Todd.
  - The Titans incarnation of Hank Hall / the Hawk appears in the Arrowverse crossover Crisis on Infinite Earths via archival footage from the episodes "Trigon" and "Titans".

=== Film ===
Hank Hall as Hawk appears in Justice League: Crisis on Infinite Earths.

=== Video games ===
Hank Hall as the Hawk appears as a character summon in Scribblenauts Unmasked: A DC Comics Adventure.

=== Miscellaneous ===
Hank Hall as the Hawk makes non-speaking cameo appearances in DC Super Hero Girls as a student of Super Hero High.
