= Per Degaton =

DC Comics supervillain

- Per Degaton as depicted in Justice League of America #209 (December 1982). Art by George Pérez.

Publication information
- Publisher: DC Comics
- First appearance: All Star Comics #35 (June/July 1947)
- Created by: John Broome; Irwin Hasen

In-story information
- Team affiliations: Injustice Society; Time Stealers; Cabal
- Abilities: Skilled armed/unarmed combatant Semi-precognitive "Time Vision"; Genius-level intellect Master planner and tactician Time travel equipment Intangibility; Seeming immortality

Per Degaton is a supervillain appearing in American comic books published by DC Comics. He is a known time-traveling villain who is a recurring enemy of the Justice Society of America.

Cory Grüter-Andrew portrays a young Degaton on the first season of Legends of Tomorrow, while an uncredited actor portrayed his older self.

== Publication history ==
Per Degaton made his first appearance in All Star Comics #35 (June/July 1947) and was created by John Broome and Irwin Hasen.

Per Degaton was one of the six original members of the Injustice Society, who began battling the Justice Society of America in All Star Comics #37 (October 1947).

== Fictional character biography ==
=== Pre-Crisis ===
Per Degaton has been obsessed with time travel ever since he was an assistant to the Time Trust, a group of scientists developing a time ray to go to the future and acquire an effective bombing defense for use during World War II. In 1941, the Justice Society of America is sent 500 years into the future to retrieve a formula that produces a bomb-proof shield. In a fit of jealousy, Degaton sabotages the formula and leaves the Time Trust.

By 1947, Degaton is assisting Professor Malachi Zee, a former member of the Time Trust who is developing a time machine. Degaton plans to take the machine for himself and shoots Zee. He makes several attempts to alter history, but it returns to normal due to paradoxes inherent in Zee's time machine. After his final attempt, Degaton is imprisoned for 30 years.

After his release, Degaton roams the streets as a derelict until his old ally Brain Wave finds him homeless and in poor health. Brain Wave restores his vitality and creates new bodies for himself and Degaton. Under cover of a series of natural disasters that he causes, Brain Wave uses a machine to sap the Justice Society's willpower and divert it to power Degaton's new body. After being defeated by the JSA, Degaton returns to prison (back in his original body), but is paroled ten years later due to his advanced age.

Taking advantage of the revelation of "Batman's Diary", a document that supposedly convicts the Justice Society of treason, Degaton uses his remaining influence to attempt to indict the group. After failing to do so, Degaton commits suicide.

=== Post-Crisis ===
Due to the events of the Crisis on Infinite Earths, Per Degaton, following his stint with the Time Trust, is employed at another secret scientific group, Project M. During this time he meets the time-traveling robot Mekanique, who enlists his aid in her war against the All-Star Squadron. In exchange for his help, Mekanique promises to give him the secrets of time travel. They fail in their attack on the All-Stars, and Mekanique's body is destroyed, but Degaton salvages her head. He keeps her head by his side for the next five years, and they fall in love.

By 1947, Degaton is assisting Professor Malachi Zee who finishes a time machine with Degaton and Mekanique's help. Degaton plans to take the machine for himself and shoots Zee, who falls into the machine, sending him 40 years into the future. Mekanique suggests that the two of them simply wait four decades for the machine to reappear, but this idea drives Degaton into a lunatic rage. He buries Mekanique's head, and makes new plans for himself.

Frustrated for being unable to harm the JSA, Degaton uses his time-traveling abilities to "watch life hurting [his enemies]". Sequentially confronting the JSA members, he tells them that he saw them die, and reveals some hints on their final moments. Now equipped with a time disc, Degaton has the ability to live "between seconds", apparently ageless in an intangible state, which he can only be removed from with the concentrated tachyons found in the hourglass of Hourman.

He mounts a new attack on the JSA after Rick Tyler changes history to save his father from his death at the hands of Extant, the change of history creating a weakness in the timestream that Degaton can use to mount an attack. He makes arrangements to ensure that the JSA's temporary 1950s dissolution would become permanent before setting up an attack on the White House that would culminate in the Atom 'self-destructing', reasoning that the death of Harry S. Truman due to a costumed hero would disgrace all masked crime-fighters and leave them branded as traitors, thus erasing from history all subsequent superheroes. Degaton is eventually stopped by an alliance of the 1950s JSA and the early-2000s JSA. The timeline is restored so that his changes never occurred. Degaton retreats into the time-stream with his memories intact rather than being forced back to 1947 with his memories wiped, renewing his commitment to watching his enemies' deaths across time.

Following his release from prison, Degaton reconstructs Mekanique, and the pair battle Infinity, Inc., at the site where Zee's time machine is to arrive. When it reappears, it contains not only the dying Zee but a past version of Degaton. It is revealed that when Degaton lunged at the disappearing machine in 1947, the machine's energies created two Degatons, one who lives a normal life and one who is carried along with the time machine. The older Degaton disintegrates instantly due to the paradoxical existence of two Degatons at one moment. Mekanique kills the younger Degaton as well as herself, fearing this Degaton would end up betraying her once more.

Degaton returns briefly in Justice League of America and then in Booster Gold as part of a team with Ultra-Humanite, Despero, Supernova, and Black Beetle, who have formed "The Time Stealers", a supervillain group that appears to be manipulating the timestream to their advantage. This version of Per Degaton, along with Ultra-Humanite and Despero, is from an earlier period in the timeline, pulled from their respective moments in time by Black Beetle and returned in the Time Masters: Vanishing Point limited series.

Later an older version of Degaton appears, calling himself Prime Degaton, who seems to have been present during the earlier plans of Per Degaton. He tells his younger self that by combining all of his infinite selves across the time lines, he will become omnipotent, but that will require his younger selves to cease to exist. When the Justice Society make Monument Point their new base, he appears with greater power over time and battles them, warning Jesse Quick about the fallen god D'arken.

=== DC Rebirth ===
In 2016, DC Comics implemented a relaunch of its books called DC Rebirth, which restored its continuity to a form much as it was prior to The New 52 reboot. Per Degaton appears as a member of the Cabal alongside Amazo, Doctor Psycho, Hugo Strange, Queen Bee, and Teel. Degaton also appears as a member of the Injustice Society in flashbacks to the 1940s. In "The New Golden Age", Huntress and her makeshift Justice Society encounter Per Degaton. Degaton murders Power Girl, Solomon Grundy, Gentleman Ghost, Harlequin's Son, Icicle, Mist, and Red Lantern until Catwoman arrives and buys Huntress time to escape to an earlier time period and save the Justice Society. Degaton arrives with various versions of himself throughout time as they attack Huntress, the JSA, Madame Xanadu, Deadman, Detective Chimp, and Batman. Doctor Fate manages to trap Degaton inside the snow globe that contains the Flashpoint reality.

== Powers and abilities ==
Per Degaton is skilled at armed combat and hand-to-hand combat. He is also a skilled tactician, possesses genius-level intellect, can become intangible, and is seemingly immortal.

Per Degaton possesses a limited "Time Vision", allowing him to know what will happen in the near future. He is out of phase with normal time, which renders him intangible. Hourman's tachyon-filled hourglass has been shown to blur his time vision and allow anyone possessing it to hit Degaton. He is also aware of changes to the timestream and has made mention of remembering events from before Crisis on Infinite Earths.

=== Equipment ===
Per Degaton travels on a "time disc", a machine that allows him to travel through time as well as having fail-safes to return time to normal should his plans fail. He also uses smaller time discs which can speed up metabolism by variable amounts.

== In other media ==
- Per Degaton appears in the Batman: The Brave and the Bold episode "The Golden Age of Justice!", voiced by Clancy Brown. This version participated in World War II, but vanished into an antimatter dimension while attempting to use the damaged Spear of Destiny. In the present, Degaton is revived by his assistant Professor Zee before being transformed into an old man by the Spear's power.
- Per Degaton appears in Legends of Tomorrow, portrayed by Cory Grüter-Andrew as a child and an uncredited actor as an adult. This version is from Kasnia in 2147 and a pupil of Vandal Savage who is stated to eventually become a dictator after Savage destroyed the world with the "Armageddon" virus, for which Degaton was blamed. Amidst the Legends' attempts to avert this future, Degaton murders his father and begins his reign early until he is betrayed and killed by Savage.
- Per Degaton appears as a character summon in Scribblenauts Unmasked: A DC Comics Adventure.
