= Goldstar (character) =

Gold Star
- Goldstar as depicted in Lobo (vol. 2) #44 (October 1997). Art by C.T. Critchlow.

Publication information
- Publisher: DC Comics
- First appearance: Collins: Booster Gold #1 (February 1986) Carter: Booster Gold #5 (June 1986) Widdle: Lobo (vol. 2) #5 (May 1994)
- Created by: Collins: Dan Jurgens Carter: Dan Jurgens Widdle: Alan Grant; Val Semeiks

In-story information
- Alter ego: Theresa "Trixie" Collins; Michelle Carter; Ernest Widdle
- Place of origin: Collins: Earth; Carter: Earth; Widdle: Planet Harmony
- Partnerships: Carter: Booster Gold
- Supporting character of: Widdle: Lobo
- Abilities: Collins: Magnetically based abilities of flight and super-strength Carter: Magnetically based abilities of flight and super-strength, magnetical blasts, resilience to chronal damage, ability to travel in time, schooled in time-travel mechanics Widdle: Good morals, harmonic "niceness vibes"

Goldstar is the name used by three characters appearing in American comic books published by DC Comics.

== Fictional character biographies ==
=== Trixie Collins ===
Goldstar was Booster Gold's original chosen superhero name. When asked who he was by the President of the United States Ronald Reagan (whose life he had just saved), Booster mixes up his old football nickname (Booster) and Goldstar. Reagan introduces him as Booster Gold and the name sticks.

Booster Gold hires S.T.A.R. Labs scientist Jack Soo to create a supersuit to wear; the suit uses magnetic energy to give the wearer superhuman strength and the capability of flight.

When Booster Gold is threatened by an anti-superhero mob, his secretary Theresa "Trixie" Collins reluctantly uses the Goldstar costume to save his life. Collins accompanies Booster when he returns to the future to recharge his depleted costume. When the group returns to the present, Collins gives up the Goldstar suit.

=== Michelle Carter ===
Booster's twin sister Michelle Carter traveled back in time like her brother and was interested in being a superhero. Michelle decided to explore the present, a time unfamiliar to her and "borrowed" the Goldstar costume. Michelle's suit has been shown to have more powers than originally seen, as she can now fire energy blasts from her wrists.

Rip Hunter saves Michelle from an explosion that would have killed her and deposits her safely years after her supposed death. Michelle spends some time unaware of the deeper implications of her return, until Rex Hunter, who was deleted from his intended timeline by the Time Stealers because of Rip Hunter's actions, returns as a chronal energy being, forcing Goldstar to witness her intended fate. Despite Rex Hunter's defeat, Michelle is left deeply traumatized, and starts obsessing about her own death, believing her life to be a glitch in the timeline. Resentful against Rip Hunter for having hidden her real fate from her, Goldstar disables Skeets and escapes.

While Rip and Booster find that Goldstar is heading to Coast City on the eve of its destruction. Booster Gold finds Goldstar and brought her back to the present, but her boyfriend Drew dies in Coast City's destruction. Goldstar contemplates returning to the 25th century, but is convinced to stay by Booster Gold.

=== Ernest Widdle ===
Ernest Widdle is a character in the Lobo comics and the younger brother of Bludhound. Goldstar thought that Lobo murdered his brother after witnessing Bludhound's death on the planet Harmony (although Bludhound actually died of an incurable disease).

Goldstar was generally depicted as an antithesis to Lobo - kind, decent, clean-cut and generally a stick in the mud (as far as Lobo was concerned). All that Goldstar wished to do was encourage niceness, decency and heroism in the universe. For this, he is routinely beaten and brutalized by Lobo.

During the "Genesis" storyline, the Godwave, a remnant of energy from the creation of the universe, travels across the universe, causing havoc. Goldstar dies in an attempt to save Lobo, jumping into the Godwave itself.

== Powers and abilities ==
The Trixie Collins version of Goldstar has magnetic-based abilities of flight and super-strength.

The Michelle Carter version of Goldstar has magnetic-based abilities of flight and super-strength, magnetic blasts, resilience to chronal damage, ability to travel in time, and is schooled in time-travel mechanics.

The Ernest Widdle version of Goldstar has good morals and harmonic "niceness vibes".
