= Hawk and Dove =

Fictional team of superheroes

- Dove (Don Hall, left) and Hawk (Hank Hall, right) from their first appearance in Showcase #75 (June 1968); Art by Steve Ditko

Group publication information
- Publisher: DC Comics
- First appearance: Showcase #75 (June 1968)
- Created by: Steve Ditko; Steve Skeates

In-story information
- Member(s): Hank Hall and Don (Donald) Hall; Hank Hall and Dawn Granger; Sasha Martens and Wiley Wolverman; Dawn Granger and Holly Granger

Hawk and Dove

Series publication information
- Publication date: (Volume 1); September 1968 – June/July 1969 (Volume 2); October – December 1988 (Volume 3); June 1989 – October 1991 (Volume 4); November 1997 – March 1998 (Volume 5); September 2011 – March 2012
- Number of issues: 6 (vol. 1); 5 (vol. 2); 28, plus 2 Annuals (vol. 3); 5 (vol. 4); 8 (vol. 5)
- Creator(s): Steve Ditko; Steve Skeates

Collected editions
- Hawk and Dove: ISBN 978-1-56389-120-5

Hawk and Dove are a superhero team appearing in American comic books published by DC Comics. Created by Steve Ditko and Steve Skeates, they appeared in Showcase #75 (June 1968) during the Silver Age of Comic Books. The duo has existed in multiple incarnations over the years across several eponymous ongoing series and miniseries, and has also appeared in a number of recurring roles and guest appearances in titles such as Teen Titans, Birds of Prey, and Brightest Day. The duo originated as teenage brothers Hank Hall as Hawk and Don Hall as Dove. Following Don's death in Crisis on Infinite Earths (1985), Dawn Granger assumed the role of Dove in Hawk & Dove #1 (October 1988). The mantle of Hawk would later be taken up by Dawn's sister Holly Granger in 2003 after Hank was killed during 1994's Zero Hour: Crisis in Time! until her death and Hank's resurrection in Blackest Night (2009). An unrelated team consisting of military cadet Sasha Martens as Hawk and rock musician Wiley Wolverman as Dove also appeared as the focus of a 1997 miniseries. The pairing of Hank and Dawn serve as the current and most commonly published incarnation of the team.

Inspired by the emerging political divides of the 1960s between pro-war hawks and pacifist doves, the central concept traditionally revolves around two young heroes with contrasting personalities and diametrically opposed ideologies who, by speaking their superheroic aliases, are transformed and granted power sets of heightened strength, speed, and agility. With Dove embodying reason and nonviolence and Hawk embodying force and aggression, the two heroes complement one another to effectively fight evil. With the introduction of Dawn Granger, it was revealed that Hawk and Dove's powers are derived from the Lords of Chaos and Order.

Though the duo's ongoing titles have all been relatively short-lived and their guest appearances in other titles sporadic, the heroes have experienced a storied and sometimes tragic history. Multiple characters have worn the respective titles of Hawk and Dove at one time or another and the legacy has experienced death, resurrection and even Hank's own descent into madness and subsequent transformation into the mass-murdering villain Monarch and later Extant.

Hank Hall, Dawn Granger, and Don Hall made their live-action debuts in the television series Titans, played by Alan Ritchson, Minka Kelly, and Elliot Knight, respectively. Furthermore, Fred Savage, Jason Hervey, Greg Ellis, and Dee Bradley Baker voice the duo in Justice League Unlimited and Batman: The Brave and the Bold respectively.

== Publication history ==
=== Silver and Bronze Ages ===
Spinning off from their Showcase debut, Hank and Don Hall received their own series titled The Hawk and the Dove. Created by plotter/artist Steve Ditko and writer Steve Skeates, with Carmine Infantino coming up with the title, Ditko plotted only the first issue and left after the second. In a 1999 interview, Skeates expressed dismay with changes that would be made to his script by Ditko and editorial, citing a tendency to neutralize Dove's abilities as a crimefighter in favor of Hawk's:

It was strange. A lot of changes would happen after I turned in a script. Quite often, my idea of what to do with the Dove was have him do brave stuff – and then it would be changed by either Dick [Giordano] or Steve into the Hawk doing that stuff. They'd say it was out of character for the Dove. They seemed to be equating Dove with wimp, wuss, coward or whatever. And I don't really think it was because they were more hawkish. I just don't think that they knew what a dove was.

Although Skeates attempted to change the direction of the series after Ditko left and artist Gil Kane joined the creative team, Skeates himself left after the fourth issue, leaving Kane to take on both writing and art responsibilities until the book's cancellation due to low sales after only the sixth issue.

The original Hawk and Dove made sporadic appearances in different DC titles throughout the 1970s and 1980s, primarily within the Teen Titans and New Teen Titans, joining the original incarnation briefly from Teen Titans #25–30 (January–October 1970), under the guidance of writers Dick Giordano and Robert Kanigher and artist Nick Cardy. Skeates also provided scripts for some of these issues they appeared in. The brothers also teamed up with Batman in The Brave and the Bold #181 (December 1981) in an out-of-continuity tale written by Alan Brennert and drawn by Jim Aparo.

The original Hawk and Dove's last appearance together was in Crisis on Infinite Earths #12 (March 1986), in which Don Hall is killed.

=== Modern Age ===
Following Dove's death, Hawk and Dove would appear together in various flashbacks, while Hawk would appear alone in occasional guest-appearances in the Teen Titans titles, including his own solo two-part story in Teen Titans Spotlight #7–8 (February–March 1987) by Mike Baron and Jackson Guice.

In 1986, Karl Kesel and Barbara Kesel began collaborating on a revival of Hawk and Dove, with the idea of creating a second Dove, who would this time be a female that would later become Dawn Granger. Karl Kesel stated:

I was inking the figure of the dead Dove on George Pérez's "Crisis" spread in The History of the DC Universe not crying tears over the death of the guy since he was pretty much a minor hero, but regretting the end of a really interesting team. I always liked Hawk and Dove. I always thought how they'd say "Hawk!" and "Dove!" and transform was really cool. Then it hit me: The mysterious voice that gave Hawk and Dove their powers could easily give the Dove powers to someone else! Maybe… a woman! I called Barbara as soon as I could. She sparked off the idea instantly and before even we knew it, we were co-writers.

The revival was approved for a five-issue miniseries, and the Kesels were joined by then-up-and-coming artist Rob Liefeld. The miniseries, shortened from its 1968 title to simply Hawk & Dove, was published in 1988–1989. The revival veered away from the duo's Silver Age political leanings and told a more straightforward superhero story with human trappings, introducing a number of supporting characters and villains that were loosely based on many of the Kesels' friends and family. Their portrayals of Hank and Dawn themselves were modeled on Barbara Kesel's brother and Karl Kesel's sister, respectively. This new direction was well received by fans and sold out, which then spurred the launch of an ongoing series with Hawk & Dove (vol. 3) in June 1989, co-written by the Kesels, with Greg Guler replacing Liefeld on art chores. The Kesels also wrote a Hawk and Dove feature in Secret Origins #43 (August 1989) that elaborated on the origin story of Hank and Don, revealing that Hawk and Dove's powers were given to them by the Lords of Chaos and Order and that Hawk and Dove themselves were Agents of Chaos and Order, respectively.

Despite its strong start, the relaunched ongoing series was eventually cancelled after 28 issues and two Annuals, with issue #28 being published in October 1991. To date, this is the longest any Hawk & Dove ongoing series has lasted.

== Fictional character biography ==
=== Hank and Don Hall ===
Hank and Don Hall in The Hawk and the Dove #1 (September 1968), cover art by Steve Ditko.

Hank and Don Hall are the sons of Judge Irwin Hall. They find out that their father has many enemies when he is nearly assassinated. Hank and Don eventually follow the attacker back to his hideout and accidentally lock themselves in the closet of some criminals plotting to dispose of him. Mysterious voices echo throughout the room, offering the boys a chance to save their father by giving them powers. The voices belong to a Lord of Chaos named T'Charr and a Lord of Order named Terataya, who had fallen in love despite their respective groups, the Lords of Chaos and Order, being enemies. The Hall brothers invoke their new powers and become Hawk and Dove. The conservative Hawk (Hank) is hot-headed and reactionary, whereas the liberal Dove (Don) is more thoughtful and reasoned, but is prone to indecisiveness. Irwin Hall displays a more centrist political beliefs, and firmly disapproves of vigilantism, not knowing his sons are costumed adventurers and saved him from his would-be assailants.

After their series ended, Hawk and Dove became semi-regulars in the Teen Titans, eventually joining Titans West. Writer Alan Brennert attempted to end their saga in a 1982 issue of The Brave and the Bold where 12 years later, Hank and Don Hall, then adults, are trying to cope with their 1960s values in the 1980s. After Hawk and Dove team up with Batman, the mysterious voice revokes Hank and Don's powers, deeming them still immature.

In Crisis on Infinite Earths, Dove is killed by the Anti-Monitor's shadow demons. Without Dove to restrain him, Hawk becomes violent to the point where many superheroes consider him nearly as much trouble as the supervillains.

=== Modern Age ===
Hawk and Dove: Hank Hall and Dawn Granger, art by Rob Liefeld.

In 1988, a new Hawk and Dove miniseries written by Karl Kesel and Barbara Kesel reintroduced the duo. This series places a woman named Dawn Granger as Dove, replacing Don. The new Dove mysteriously receives her powers while attempting to save her mother from terrorists. At the end of the miniseries, it is revealed that Dawn received her powers the moment Don lost them.

This Dove, while considerably more aggressive and self-confident than Don, also has greater-than-average strength and dexterity, faster-than-human speed and expanded mental capabilities. Dove fights mostly defensively, preferring to out-think and remain in control of her opponent. She also heals quickly and cannot revert to Dawn if her wounds or some other condition would be fatal to Dawn. They manage to hold their own against the Lords of Chaos' creation Kestrel.

Set in Washington, D.C. (where the duo attend Georgetown University), the series introduces several supporting characters, including Hank's girlfriend, Ren Takamori, and friends Kyle Spenser and Donna Cabot. They also work with police Captain Brian "Sal" Arsala, who develops a mutual admiration for Dawn. It also introduces Kestrel, an evil spell created by M'Shulla and Barter, owner of Barter Trading: Exotic Goods and Services.

Hawk and Dove are lured to the mystical land of Druspa Tau – the home of the Lords of Chaos and Order – by Kestrel in an effort by M'Shulla to seek out that world's Lords of Order. T'Charr and Terataya are later found in the form of a combined being called Unity. After M'Shulla and Kestrel are defeated, T'Charr and Terataya reveal that they empowered Hawk and Dove to prove to the other Lords of Chaos and Order that the two forces could work together (The reader learns that heir ultimate hope is that Hawk an Dove will conceive a child together, a literal mingling of Chaos and Order, but they do not reveal this to Hawk and Dove.). T'Charr and Terataya convince Hawk and Dove to absorb their essences, which enhances their powers: Dove gains the ability to fly and is stronger and bulletproof; and Hawk gains superhuman strength and durability.

=== Hawk's fall and redemption: Armageddon 2001, Zero Hour: Crisis in Time! and JSA ===
The villain Monarch was originally intended to be a future version of Captain Atom. After this information was leaked to the public, DC Comics changed the storyline last-minute. Sales of Hawk and Dove had dipped and the series was slotted for cancellation, contributing to the decision to make Hank Hall the true identity of Monarch. In a fight against the heroes, Monarch murders Dawn, causing Hank to suffer a psychotic break, kill Monarch and assume his villainous identity. He briefly becomes a recurring foe for Captain Atom before absorbing Waverider's time-travel powers, subsequently changing his form and name to Extant in Zero Hour: Crisis in Time!.

As Extant, Hawk murders several members of the Justice Society of America; during a rematch, however, the Atom Smasher uses Metron's Mobius Chair to transfer Hall onto a doomed plane in place of Atom Smasher's mother.

=== Sasha Martens and Wiley Wolverman ===
Hawk and Dove: Sasha Martens and Wiley Wolverman.

Another version of Hawk (Sasha Martens) and Dove (Wiley Wolverman) appear in a five-issue miniseries in 1997, written by Mike Baron. In this version, completely unrelated to the concept of the Lords of Chaos and Order, the duo's conflicting personalities manifest as "military brat" and "slacker dude", respectively. They gain large bird-like wings and a telepathic link after receiving experimental medical treatments as children. Following the miniseries, the new Hawk and Dove make a handful of cameo appearances in Titans-related books, once protecting the town of Woodstock, New York, during a worldwide crisis.

=== Holly and Dawn Granger ===
In 2003, JSA #45–50 tell of a mysterious woman in a coma who is taken into the care of the Justice Society. Initially thought to be the comatose body of Hector Hall's missing wife, Hippolyta Trevor, the woman is revealed to be none other than the presumed-dead Dawn Granger. Dawn's "death" is revealed to be a hoax orchestrated by Mordru, who turns out to have caused Hank's insanity that set him down the path to becoming Monarch (and later Extant).

Dawn later gains a new partner when her estranged sister Holly Granger is granted the mystical powers of Chaos as the third Hawk. Holly's first appearance is in Teen Titans (vol. 3) #22–23, joining her sister and many other former Titans against Doctor Light. The duo later re-teams with the Titans to rescue Raven's "soul self" from their old nemesis Kestrel.

Hawk and Dove also appeared in Countdown to Mystery, in which Dawn Granger is among the heroes possessed by Eclipso. In Teen Titans (vol. 3) #34 (post-Infinite Crisis), Holly and Dawn are shown in Titans Tower sometime during the previous year, with dialogue from Hawk implying that they were at the time members of the Teen Titans. Their association with the team was temporary, though they resurface in the Titans East Special as part of a new team organized by Cyborg.

=== Blackest Night ===
In Blackest Night, Hank Hall is resurrected as a Black Lantern. He lures Holly and Dawn to a library, then kills Holly by ripping out her heart. The black power rings claim Holly's body, but are unable to resurrect Don Hall. Writer Geoff Johns attributed Don's immunity to him being at peace in death, leaving him unable to be affected by the rings.

Dove goes to Titans Tower for help, only to find it under attack by several dead Titans members, who have become Black Lanterns. When Holly attempts to rip out Dawn's heart, a blast of white energy radiates from her body, severing the connection between Holly and the ring. Dawn turns the light on the other Black Lanterns, destroying all but Terra, Tempest, and Hank. Barry Allen realizes that Dawn possesses the "white light of creation", a power created by the combined seven powers of the emotional spectrum. In the aftermath of the final battle, Hank is resurrected by the white light.

=== Brightest Day ===
Hank and Dawn encounter Deadman shortly after the events of Blackest Night. They have him, in their own particular ways, try to resurrect Don and Holly, but to no avail. The three are transported to Silver City, New Mexico, where they find the White Lantern power battery in a crater. When Deadman asks the white battery why they were all brought back to life, the Life Entity tells them that it is dying and requires a successor. The Entity also tells Hawk to save Dawn from Captain Boomerang.

Hawk and Dove are transported to the Star City forest by the Entity, where it tells them that they must protect the forest and withstand Alec Holland. Within the forest, Captain Boomerang finds Dawn and throws a boomerang at her. Hawk fails to catch it, with Deadman catching it instead and dying in the process. Hawk is left to knock Captain Boomerang unconscious.

=== The New 52 ===
In 2011, DC relaunched this title as part of their company-wide reboot of their 52 major titles. It was released on 7 September, written by Sterling Gates and art by Rob Liefeld.

In this new series, Hawk and Dove are Hank Hall and Dawn Granger, who resume their superhero activities in Washington, D.C., with assistance from Deadman. They encounter Condor and Swan, a new pair of supervillains who possess superpowers similar to theirs. Hawk and Dove fight Condor and Swan after they try to kill President Barack Obama and Hank's father. Swan escapes, but Hawk and Dove manage to defeat Condor, who is revealed to be an old unnamed man.

During the first issue, the origins of Hawk and Dove are recounted – Don and Hank were Dove and Hawk for at least two years, until three years before the start of the series, when Don died during the "worst crisis the world has ever seen" (referencing Don's death in the original canon in the Crisis) and Dawn became the next avatar almost immediately. This is later retconned in the Titans Hunt miniseries, where it is revealed that Hank and Don were members of the original Teen Titans, and that Don was killed during a battle with Mister Twister.

== Powers and abilities ==
=== Dove ===
Dawn Granger transforms into Dove in the presence of danger. The transformation wears off a short time after any danger has passed, unless Dove is seriously injured. As Dove, Dawn gains avian characteristics, which are hidden under her costume.

Dove is also hypervigilant; her natural aptitudes are enhanced, such as her ability to judge people which allows her to "read" people and objects, and know how they will behave. In addition to flight, she also has enhanced agility and a healing factor.

During the Blackest Night storyline, Dove is revealed to be able to harness the white light of creation, a combination of the other aspects of the emotional spectrum. The white light is able to destroy Black Lanterns along with blocking a Black Lantern's aura-reading power.

=== Hawk ===
Hawk possesses a "danger sense transformation" which allows him to change into a super-human with the powers of superstrength, unlimited stamina, enhanced speed, enhanced agility, enhanced durability, enhanced body density and healing factor.

His partner Dove suppresses his violent nature and without her presence Hawk's rage becomes boundless.

While he was a member of the Black Lantern Corps, Hawk wielded a black power ring which allowed him to generate black energy constructs. He was also able to perceive emotional auras.

== Enemies ==
Outside of the enemies they fought with the Teen Titans, each of the Hawk and Dove incarnations had their own enemies:

- Condor – The evil counterpart of Hawk. Condor's identity is an unnamed elderly man who was a 200 year old cannibalistic serial killer of Avatars.
- D'Khan – A priest who is secretly the ancient Dragon of D'Yak.
- Hunter – A supervillain who worked for the "D'Yak" and had hunted Hawk and Dove.
- Kestrel – A formless supervillain created by M'Shulla and Gorrum of the Lords of Chaos to either subvert Hawk to the forces of evil or kill him. Powers are possession, dimensional travel and strength.
- Necromancer – A powerful sorceress who tried unlocking unlimited magical power with the circle of totems.
- Shellshock – A mysterious woman who can detonate anything by saying its name.
- Sudden Death – A beach bum-themed metahuman named Dwayne Wainwright with incredible strength, stamina, and an ability to generate explosions of massive force. He would later join the Suicide Squad.
- Swan – The evil counterpart of Dove and killer of Ospery to gain power as an Avatar. Swan's identity is Rachel Felps who was later killed for her power by Condor.
- Unity – Dr. Arsala is the daughter of Hank and Dawn from an alternate future who used the Gem of Order to become Unity.

== Collected editions ==
- Hawk and Dove (collects Hawk and Dove (vol. 2) #1–5), November 1993, ISBN 978-1-56389-120-5
- Hawk and Dove: Ghosts & Demons (new edition also collects Hawk and Dove (vol. 2) #1–5), March 2012, ISBN 978-1401233976
- DC Comics Presents: Brightest Day Vol. 3 (collects Teen Titans (vol. 3) #27–28; Legends of the DC Universe #26–27), February 2011 – features Hawk (Holly) and Dove (Dawn), alongside the Teen Titans, fighting Kestrel.
- Hawk and Dove: First Strikes (collects Hawk and Dove (vol. 5) #1–8), August 2012, ISBN 978-1781163993
- Teen Titans: The Silver Age Omnibus (collects Showcase #75, Hawk and Dove #1–6, Teen Titans #21), November 2016, ISBN 978-1401267568
- The Hawk and the Dove: The Silver Age (collects Showcase #75, Hawk and Dove #1–6, Teen Titans #21), April 2018, ISBN 978-1401278052

== In other media ==
=== Television ===
- The Hank and Don Hall incarnations of Hawk and Dove appear in Justice League Unlimited, voiced by Fred Savage and Jason Hervey respectively. This version of the duo are members of the Justice League who possess a strong relationship, with Don being more self-confident than Hank and their philosophical bickering resembling brotherly teasing. Additionally Hank utilizes brute force and aggressive tactics, at times resembling a football player, while Don uses a blend of techniques reminiscent of aikido or judo, using his attacker's movements to fling them aside.
- The Hank and Don Hall incarnations of Hawk and Dove appear in Batman: The Brave and the Bold, voiced by Greg Ellis and Dee Bradley Baker respectively.
- The Hank and Don Hall incarnations of Hawk and Dove, as well as Dawn Granger, appear in Titans, portrayed by Alan Ritchson, Elliot Knight, and Minka Kelly, respectively, while Tait Blum and Jayden Marine portray younger versions of Hank and Don, respectively. The series' versions of the trio are humans who all rely on their physical prowess - Hank as a football player, Don as a martial artist, and Dawn as a ballerina - to fight crime. Moreover, the Halls are half-brothers who operated as the original Hawk and Dove to hunt down sexual predators, motivated by abuse that Hank's football coach inflicted on him as a child. After Don and Dawn's mother, Marie, are killed in an accident, Hank and Dawn gradually enter a relationship, with Dawn subsequently becoming the new Dove using the physical abuse she and Marie suffered at the hands of the former's father as motivation. The new duo go on to meet and team up with Dick Grayson and the Titans, though tensions occur when Grayson and Dawn enter a romantic relationship. While planning on retiring, Hank and Dawn cross paths with Grayson again when he requests their help in protecting Rachel Roth. This leads to Hank, Dawn, and Grayson being attacked by the Nuclear Family, who were hired to retrieve Roth, and Dawn ending up in a coma due to injuries sustained in the ensuing fight. Dawn eventually awakens when she receives a vision from Roth, telling her and Hank to find Jason Todd.
  - Hank and Dawn appear in "Crisis on Infinite Earths" via archive footage from the episodes "Trigon" and "Titans".

=== Film ===
The Hank Hall and Dawn Granger incarnations of Hawk and Dove appear in Justice League: Crisis on Infinite Earths.

=== Miscellaneous ===
The Hank Hall and Dawn Granger incarnations of Hawk and Dove make non-speaking appearances in DC Super Hero Girls as students of Super Hero High.
