= Zero Hour: Crisis in Time! =

1994 DC Comics crossover storyline

- Cover of the Zero Hour: Crisis in Time trade paperback, art by Dan Jurgens.

Publication information
- Publisher: DC Comics
- Schedule: Weekly
- Format: Limited series
- Publication date: September 1994
- No. of issues: 5
- Main character: DC Universe

Creative team
- Created by: Dan Jurgens; Jerry Ordway
- Written by: Dan Jurgens
- Penciller: Dan Jurgens
- Inker: Jerry Ordway
- Letterer: Gaspar Saladino
- Colorist: Gregory Wright
- Editor: KC Carlson

Collected editions
- Zero Hour: Crisis in Time: ISBN 1563891840

"Zero Hour: Crisis in Time!" is a comic book crossover storyline published by DC Comics in 1994, consisting of an eponymous five-issue limited series written and drawn by Dan Jurgens and a number of tie-in books.

In the storyline, Hal Jordan, a member of the intergalactic police force known as the Green Lantern Corps, goes mad with grief after the destruction of his home town of Coast City during the "Reign of the Supermen!" storyline and attempts to destroy and remake the DC Universe after having obtained immense power as Parallax. The issues of the limited series were numbered in reverse order, beginning with issue #4 and ending with #0. The crossover involved almost every DC Universe monthly series published at the time.

== Background ==
Zero Hour: Crisis in Time! was the follow-up to the Crisis on Infinite Earths limited series. This event served as an opportunity to reconcile continuity problems left unaddressed by Crisis and other problems that had been unintentionally caused by it. In particular, the revised characters of the post-Crisis universe had been rolled out gradually, with DC continuing to feature the old versions until the new versions were launched.

== Plot ==
The story begins when characters from alternate realities such as Alpha Centurion, an alternate version of Batgirl, and Triumph suddenly start appearing in the DC Universe. A wave of entropy then moves from the end of time to the beginning, erasing entire historical ages in the process.

Parallax (Hal Jordan, center), about to recreate the DC Universe in his image. Also pictured (clockwise from upper left): Time Trapper, Metron, Extant, the Spectre, and Superman. Art by George Pérez, from Green Lantern Gallery #1.

The villain of the story is Extant, formerly Hawk of the duo Hawk and Dove. Extant has acquired temporal powers, using them to unravel the DC Universe's timeline. In a confrontation with the Justice Society of America, Extant ages several of them — removing the effect that has kept them young from the 1940s into the present day — leaving them either feeble or dead. However, the true villain behind the destruction of the universe turns out to be Hal Jordan, a member of the Green Lantern Corps. Calling himself Parallax, Jordan has gone insane and is now trying to remake the universe, undoing the events which have caused his breakdown and his own murderous actions following it. The collective efforts of the other superheroes manage to stop Parallax from creating his vision of a new universe, and the timeline is recreated anew, albeit with subtle differences compared to the previous one, after the young hero Damage, with help from the other heroes, triggers a new Big Bang. Although Jordan was severely weakened from using so much energy, he manages to survive even after Green Arrow shoots an arrow into his heart.

== Aftermath ==
DC published a fold-out timeline inside the back cover of Zero Hour #0 which identified various events and key stories and when they occurred. Although fixed dates were given for the debut of historical characters such as the JSA, the debut of Superman was presented as "10 years ago" and subsequent dates were expressed the same way, keeping the calendar years of these events fluid and relative to the present as a way to keep the characters at their present ages.

The Legion of Super-Heroes was completely rebooted following Zero Hour, and the various Hawkman characters were merged into one. Most ongoing series at the time retold the origin of its heroes in a #0 issue published after the end of Zero Hour and resumed their previous numbering the following month or went on to #1.

=== Tie-in issues ===
- Action Comics #703
- The Adventures of Superman #516
- Anima #7
- Batman #511
- Batman: Shadow of the Bat #31
- Catwoman (vol. 2) #14
- Damage #6
- Darkstars #24
- Detective Comics #678
- Flash (vol. 3) #94
- Green Arrow (vol. 2) #90
- Green Lantern (vol. 3) #55
- Guy Gardner: Warrior #24
- Hawkman (vol. 3) #13
- Justice League America #92
- Justice League International (vol. 2) #68
- Justice League Task Force #16
- L.E.G.I.O.N. '94 #70
- Legion of Super-Heroes (vol. 4) #61
- Legionnaires #18
- Outsiders (vol. 2) #11
- Robin (vol. 4) #10
- Showcase '94 #8-10 (prelude)
- Steel (vol. 2) #8
- Superboy (vol. 3) #8
- Superman (vol. 2) #93
- Superman: The Man of Steel #37
- Team Titans #24
- Valor #23
- Comics Values Monthly #95
- Zero Month Sampler
- Zero Hour: Crisis in Time Ashcan Edition
- Zero: The Beginning of Tomorrow

=== Series ending with Zero Hour ===
- Team Titans (a spin-off of The New Titans)
- L.E.G.I.O.N. '94
- Valor
- Justice League International (vol. 2)

=== Series rebooted during Zero Hour ===
- Legion of Super-Heroes (vol. 4) and Legionnaires (after Zero Hour, both titles were treated as one bi-weekly series, much like the Superman books at the time)

=== Series launched following Zero Hour ===
- Extreme Justice
- Fate
- R.E.B.E.L.S. '94 (replacement for L.E.G.I.O.N. '94)
- Manhunter
- Primal Force
- Starman (vol. 2)
- Xenobrood (miniseries)

== Zero Month ==
Following the end of Zero Hour, every DC Universe title published a #0 issue retelling the character or team's origins and featured the slogan "The Beginning of Tomorrow!" in an event dubbed "Zero Month".

- Batman #0
- Deathstroke the Hunted #0
- Flash (vol. 3) #0
- Legion of Super-Heroes (vol. 4) #0
- Primal Force #0
- The Spectre (vol. 3) #0
- Superboy (vol. 3) #0
- Superman: The Man of Steel #0
- Wonder Woman (vol. 2) #0
- Batman: Shadow of the Bat #0
- The Demon (vol. 3) #0
- Green Lantern (vol. 3) #0
- Hawkman (vol. 3) #0
- Justice League America #0
- The New Titans #0
- Starman (vol. 2) #0
- Superman (vol. 2) #0
- The Adventures of Superman #0
- Batman: Legends of the Dark Knight #0
- Detective Comics #0
- Fate #0
- Gunfire #0
- Justice League Task Force #0
- Legionnaires #0
- Outsiders (vol. 2) #0
- The Ray (vol. 2) #0
- R.E.B.E.L.S.'94 #0
- Steel (vol. 2) #0
- Xenobrood #0
- Action Comics #0
- Anima #0
- Aquaman #0
- Catwoman (vol. 2) #0
- Damage #0
- The Darkstars #0
- Green Arrow (vol. 2) #0
- Guy Gardner, Warrior #0
- Lobo #0
- Manhunter #0
- Robin (vol. 4) #0

=== Booster Gold #0 (2008) ===
In 2008, 14 years after the end of Zero Hour, an issue of Booster Gold (vol. 2) was published as "Booster Gold #0", and was announced as an official Zero Hour tie-in by DC Comics. The issue used the same cover style as the previous tie-ins to the event, referring to the "Crisis in Time" and using the semi-metallic "fifth color" ink used on the original Zero Hour issues. Like the other tie-in issues, Booster's origin was explained as part of the adventure in the issue. The cover was a homage to Zero Hour #4, with Ted Kord's mask replacing Wally West's, alternate Blue Beetles replacing the alternate Hawkmen and the superheroes around the edges replaced by Booster in the center.

== 30th Anniversary Special ==
In August 2024, DC Comics published a graphic novel, Zero Hour 30th Anniversary Special #1, to commemorate the three decades since publication of the original miniseries. The book consists of an all-new story co-written by original author Jurgens and Ron Marz, with a group of artists and others contributing multi-page segments, as well as alternate cover artworks. The new story's main character is Kyle Rayner, the last surviving member of the Green Lantern Corps at the end of Zero Hour. Rayner is transported to a "pocket universe" created by Hal Jordan in his guise as Parallax, where he encounters alternate versions of fellow superheroes and villains he knows fighting each other and the "oblivion wave" that had erased realities in the original series.

== In other media ==
Some elements of the Zero Hour storyline were loosely adapted into Green Lantern: Beware My Power as part of the Tomorrowverse.

== Collected editions ==
Title	Material collected	Published date	ISBN
Zero Hour: Crisis in Time	Zero Hour: Crisis in Time #4-0 and material from Showcase '94 #8-9	August 1994	978-1563891847
Batman: Zero Hour	Batman #0, 511; Batman: Shadow of the Bat #0, 31; Detective Comics #0, 678; Catwoman #0, 14; Batman: Legends of the Dark Knight #0; Robin #0, #10	June 2017	978-1401272586
Justice League: Zero Hour	Justice League Task Force #0, 15-16, Justice League International #67-68, Justice League America #0, 92, The Ray #0, Extreme Justice #0, Guy Gardner, Warrior #0, 24	June 2019	978-1401291648
Superman: Zero Hour	Adventures of Superman #0, 516, Superman #0, 93, Superman: The Man of Steel #0, 37, Superman in Action Comics #0, 703, Steel #0, 8, Superboy #8, 0	June 2018	978-1401280536
Zero Hour: Crisis in Time 25th Anniversary Omnibus	Action Comics #703, Adventures of Superman #516, Anima #7, Batman #511, Batman: Shadow of the Bat #31, Catwoman #14, Damage #6, Darkstars #24, Detective Comics #678, The Flash #0 and #94, Green Arrow #90, Green Lantern #0 and #55, Guy Gardner: Warrior #24, Hawkman #13, Justice League America #92, Justice League International #68, Justice League Task Force #16, L.E.G.I.O.N. '94 #70, Legionnaires #18, Legion of Super-Heroes #61, Outsiders #11, Robin #10, Steel #8, Superboy #8, Superman #93, Superman: Man of Steel #37, Team Titans #24, Valor #23, Zero Hour #4-0, Zero Month Sampler and material from Showcase '94 #8-10	October 2019	978-1401294366
DC Finest: Zero Hour: Crisis in Time Part One	Zero Hour: Crisis in Time #4–3, Superman #93, The Flash #94, L.E.G.I.O.N. #70, Green Lantern #55, Superman: The Man of Steel #37, Team Titans #24, The Darkstars #24, Valor #23, Batman #511, Batman: Shadow of the Bat #31, Detective Comics #678, Legionnaires #18, Hawkman #13, Showcase '94 #8–9, Steel #8, Superboy #8, Outsiders #11	Dec 10, 2024	978-1779528506
DC Finest: Zero Hour: Crisis in Time Part Two	Zero Hour: Crisis in Time #2–0, The Flash #0, Green Arrow #90, Adventures of Superman #516, Justice League America #92, Action Comics #703, Justice League International #68, Legion of Super-Heroes #61, Green Lantern #0, Superman: The Man of Steel #0, Guy Gardner: Warrior #24, Justice League Task Force #16, Catwoman #14, Robin #10, Showcase '94 #10, Damage #0, 6, Anima #7	May 6, 2025	978-1799501305
