= Supernova (DC Comics) =

Identity used by three characters in the DC Comics Universe

- Supernova, as appeared on a panel of 52 #35, art by Phil Jimenez.

Publication information
- Publisher: DC Comics
- First appearance: 52 #8
- Created by: Geoff Johns; Grant Morrison; Greg Rucka; Mark Waid; Keith Giffen

In-story information
- Alter ego: Michael Jon Carter; Daniel Carter; Jon Carter
- Abilities: Possesses advanced technology allowing: Flight; Light emission; Energy projection; Teleportation; Shrinking

Supernova is an identity used by three characters in the DC Comics Universe, all related to the Carter bloodline. The first appearance of this character was in the weekly DC Comics series 52 where the mystery of his true identity and purpose was one of the recurring themes of the series.

== Publication history ==
=== 52 ===
The character of Supernova first appears during the eighth issue of the weekly comic series 52. In issue #15, as Booster Gold gets bad promotion and publicity, Supernova receives the promotion and publicity that he once had. Elongated Man deduces the identity of Supernova, but this information is not shared with the reader until issue #37 of the series where he is revealed to be Booster Gold. With the assistance of Rip Hunter, he had faked his death and traveled back in time to become Supernova as part of a plan to stop his robot Skeets, who was being controlled by Mister Mind.

The Supernova suit is then employed by Daniel Carter, an ancestor of Booster Gold and Hunter. Daniel is a former high school football player whose career ended following a debilitating knee injury. Mister Mind finds and manipulates Daniel, trapping him in the timestream before he is rescued by Hunter, who defeats Mind. Daniel uses the Supernova suit for a time to become a superhero on his own.

=== Booster Gold ===
Supernova is next seen in the relaunched Booster Gold series, which continues from the events of 52. Rip Hunter and Booster Gold continue their alliance to prevent history from being altered. The Supernova suit is stolen by Booster Gold's father Jon Carter, who works with Ultra-Humanite, Per Degaton, Despero, and Black Beetle in an attempt to change history for his benefit.

Parallel to those events, Daniel meets Rose Levin, a journalist hoping to make her fortune selling articles and photos of Booster Gold. At first, Rose not only finds him uneducated, uncultured and basically repellent, which serves only to entice Daniel's attraction further, but is flabbergasted by the idea that she and Daniel will eventually marry. Eventually, Daniel and Rose do get together in a rocky, argumentative, yet committed relationship.

== Powers and abilities ==
Supernova uses a Phantom Zone Projector built into his suit to teleport matter from one place to another through the Phantom Zone. The suit contains a copy of the size-changing belt used by the Atom, and an advanced laser system able to melt steel. Additionally, the suit can freeze time for its wearer, allowing them to survive without sustenance and preventing them from aging.
