= List of Justice League members =

The Justice League is a team of comic book superheroes in the DC Comics Universe. Over the years they have featured many characters in a variety of combinations.

The JLA members are listed here in order of their first joining the team, and none are listed twice. No retconned members are listed (except where they historically took part in the stories). No associates and unofficial members, or members of the Super Friends (except when they are also Justice League members in the mainstream comics) are listed.

Non-full members and staff are also listed below.

Characters in bold are current Justice League active members.

== Pre-New 52/Rebirth ==
DC Comics had the first fictional universe of superheroes, with the Justice Society of America forming in the Golden Age of Comic Books in the 1940s. This shared continuity became increasingly complex with multiple worlds, including a similar team of all-star superheroes formed in the 1960s named the Justice League of America, debuting in The Brave and the Bold Volume 1 #28. This universe included several reboots and retcons starting with Crisis on Infinite Earths in 1986 and culminating in the Flashpoint storyline, leading to the New 52 in 2011.

=== Members ===
Character	Real name	Joined in	Notes
==== Original team: Justice League of America ==== Seven members were featured in the team's first appearance (The Brave and the Bold #28, February–March 1960), with new members added in the team's own series (Justice League of America launched in November 1960). This incarnation lasted until the mid-1980s.
Superman	Kal-El / Clark Kent	The Brave and the Bold #28	Founding members. Active.
Batman	Bruce Wayne	The Brave and the Bold #28	Founding members. Active.
Wonder Woman	Princess Diana / Diana Prince	The Brave and the Bold #28	Founding members. Active.
The Flash	Barry Allen	The Brave and the Bold #28	Founding members. Active.
Green Lantern	Hal Jordan	The Brave and the Bold #28	Founding members. Active.
Aquaman	Orin / Arthur Curry	The Brave and the Bold #28	Founding member. Active. The Emperor in Justice Arcana.
Martian Manhunter	J'onn J'onzz / John Jones	The Brave and the Bold #28	Founding member. Active. The Hermit in Justice Arcana.
Green Arrow	Oliver Queen	Justice League of America #4	Active. Judgement in Justice Arcana.
Atom	Ray Palmer	Justice League of America #14	Active in civilian identity as an agent of S.H.A.D.E
Hawkman	Katar Hol / Carter Hall	Justice League of America #31	Retconned as the Golden Age Hawkman (JLA: Incarnations #1). Active. One of The Lovers in Justice Arcana.
Metamorpho	Rex Mason	Justice League of America #42	Metamorpho is offered membership but refuses, willing to be a stand-by member. He is later called into action in issue #44 and appears with several superheroes in issues #100–102. He attends a funeral for Aquaman alongside other Leaguers in Aquaman #30.
Black Canary	Dinah Drake / Dinah Laurel Lance	Justice League of America #74	Active in Birds of Prey. For a period, after Crisis on Infinite Earths a retcon in Secret Origins (vol. 2) #32 (November, 1988) revealed she was a founding member instead of Wonder Woman. The latter was changed to being a fairly new hero who debuted several years after the League formed.
Phantom Stranger	Unknown	Justice League of America #103	Active. The Magician in Justice Arcana.
Elongated Man	Ralph Dibny	Justice League of America #105	Deceased in 52 #42. Post Flash-Point member of the Secret Six. Elongated Man is one of the few Justice League members who isn't a reimagined Golden Age hero, though he is similar to Quality Comics' Plastic Man; DC acquired the rights to all Quality characters in 1956 but editor Julius Schwartz was evidently ignorant of this when he had Elongated Man created in the pages of The Flash.
Red Tornado	Ulthoon / John Smith	Justice League of America #106	Post Flash-Point Status unknown
Green Lantern	John Stewart	Justice League of America #110	Stewart fills in for Earth's primary Green Lantern, Hal Jordan. He also appears with the League in Justice League of America Annual #1 in 1983 and the first Red Tornado mini-series.
Hawkwoman	Shayera Thal	Justice League of America #146	Retconned as the Golden Age Hawkgirl (JLA: Incarnations #1). Active.
Zatanna	Zatanna Zatara	Justice League of America #161	Active in Justice League Dark.
Firestorm	Ronnie Raymond and Martin Stein	Justice League of America #179	Ronnie Raymond (with Jason Rusch) Active. The Sun in Justice Arcana.
==== Detroit team ==== This team existed for a few years in the mid-1980s following the disbanding of the original team. It consisted of Aquaman, Zatanna, Elongated Man and J'onn J'onzz (and later Batman), plus the following members:
Steel	Hank Heywood III	Justice League of America Annual #2	Deceased in Justice League America #38.
Vixen	Mari McCabe	Justice League of America Annual #2	Active in JLI
Vibe	Paco Ramone	Justice League of America Annual #2	Deceased in Justice League of America #258.
Gypsy	Cindy Reynolds	Justice League of America #236	Active.
==== Justice League International ==== This group was formed in the late 1980s after the Crisis on Infinite Earths and lasted until the early 1990s. During this era the Justice League was split into several teams. Lineup changes were rather frequent. Most of the Silver Age members were at least briefly part of one of these teams, and in addition, the following characters joined for the first time during this period:
Blue Beetle	Ted Kord	Legends #6	Deceased in Countdown to Infinite Crisis #1.
Captain Marvel	Billy Batson	Legends #6	Inactive; depowered in Justice Society of America (vol. 3) #23.
Doctor Fate	Kent Nelson	Legends #6	Deceased in The Book of Fate #1.
Green Lantern	Guy Gardner	Legends #6	Active in the Green Lantern Corps and JLI.
Mister Miracle	Scott Free	Justice League #1	Deceased in Death of the New Gods #8. Resurrected, but then displaced to Earth-51, in Final Crisis #7.
Doctor Light	Kimiyo Hoshi	Justice League #1	Active.
Booster Gold	Michael Carter	Justice League #4	Active in JLI. The Devil in Justice Arcana.
Captain Atom	Nathaniel Adam	Justice League International #7	Active.
Rocket Red 7	Vladimir Mikoyan	Justice League International #7	Revealed as a Manhunter cyborg. Destroyed in Justice League International #9.
Rocket Red 4	Dimitri Pushkin	Justice League International #11	Deceased in The OMAC Project #5.
Fire	Beatriz da Costa	Justice League International #14	Active in JLI.
Ice	Tora Olafsdotter	Justice League International #14	Deceased in Justice League Task Force #14. Revived in Birds of Prey #104. Active in JLI.
Hawkman	Fel Andar	Justice League International #19	Retcon membership; originally the Silver Age Katar Hol. Revealed as a traitor. Deceased in Hawkman (vol. 4) #48.
Hawkwoman	Sharon Parker	Justice League International #19	Retcon membership; originally the Silver Age Shayera Hol. Deceased in Hawkworld (vol. 2) #23.
Huntress	Helena Bertinelli	Justice League America #30	Active in Birds of Prey.
Doctor Fate	Linda Strauss	Justice League America #31	Deceased in Dr. Fate Vol 2 #24 (1991).
Lightray	Solis	Justice League America #42	Deceased in Countdown to Final Crisis #48. Resurrected, but then displaced to Earth-51, in Final Crisis #7.
Orion		Justice League America #42	Deceased in Final Crisis #1.
General Glory	Joseph Jones	Justice League America #50	Deceased in Justice League Quarterly #16.
Tasmanian Devil	Hugh Dawkins	Justice League America #56	Deceased in Justice League: Cry for Justice #3. Resurrected in Starman/Congorilla #1
Maxima		Justice League America #63	Deceased in Superman: The Man of Steel #117.
Ray	Ray Terrill	Justice League America #71	Active in the Freedom Fighters.
Black Condor	Ryan Kendall	Justice League America #71	Deceased in Infinite Crisis #1.
Agent Liberty	Benjamin Lockwood	Justice League America #71	Deceased in Action Comics #873.
Bloodwynd	—	Justice League America #78	Active.
Flash	Jay Garrick	Justice League America #78	Active in the JSA.
==== Justice League Europe ====
Animal Man	Buddy Baker	Justice League International #24	Active.
Flash	Wally West	Justice League International #24	Active. The Chariot in Justice Arcana.
Metamorpho	Rex Mason	Justice League International #24	Active in the Outsiders.
Power Girl	Kara Zor-L / Karen Starr	Justice League International #24	Active.
Crimson Fox	Vivian and Constance d'Aramis	Justice League Europe #13	Vivian deceased in Justice League America #104. Constance deceased in Starman (vol. 2) #38.
Blue Jay	Jay Abrams	Justice League Europe #20	Active. Left for the Multiverse in Justice League of America (vol. 2) #53.
Silver Sorceress	Laura Neilsen	Justice League Europe #20	Deceased in Justice League Europe #35.
Maya	Chandi Gupta	Justice League Europe #50.	Active.
==== Justice League Antarctica ==== This was a one-shot team played exclusively for humor.
Major Disaster	Paul Booker	Justice League Annual #4.	Death confirmed in Blackest Night: Director's Cut #1.
G'nort	Gnort Esplanade G'neeshmacher	Justice League Annual #4.	Later became a member of the Darkstars. Presumably still active.
Multi-Man	Duncan Pramble	Justice League Annual #4.	Active.
Big Sir	Dufus P. Ratchett	Justice League Annual #4.	Deceased in Suicide Squad (vol. 2) #1.
Cluemaster	Arthur Brown	Justice League Annual #4.	Active.
Clock King	William Tockman	Justice League Annual #4.	Active.
The Mighty Bruce	Unknown	Justice League Annual #4.	Active.
Scarlet Skier	Dren Keeg	Justice League Annual #4.	Active.
==== Post-Zero Hour ==== Three teams would use the name Justice League in the early 1990s: Justice League America (led by Wonder Woman), Justice League Task Force (led by the Martian Manhunter), and Extreme Justice (led by Captain Atom).
Triumph	William MacIntyre	Justice League International #67	Deceased in JLA #38. Strength in Justice Arcana.
Hawkman	Katar Hol	Justice League America #0	Deceased in Hawkman Vol 3 #33.
Nuklon	Albert Rothstein	Justice League America #0	Active in the JSA as Atom Smasher.
Obsidian	Todd Rice	Justice League America #0	Active in the JSA.
Amazing Man	Will Everett III	Justice League America #0	Deceased in Starman (vol. 2) #38.
Blue Devil	Daniel Cassidy	Justice League America #98.	Active.
Icemaiden	Sigrid Nansen	Justice League America #98.	Inactive due to severe injuries.
L-Ron/Despero		Justice League Task Force #12	L-Ron/Despero now separated. L-Ron: Active in Robot Renegades. Despero: Active. L-Ron, in his robot form, is also listed in the staff section.
Mystek	Jennifer Barclay	Justice League Task Force #26	Deceased in Justice League Task Force #32.
Zan and Jayna (Wonder Twins)	Zan & Jayna of Exor	Extreme Justice #16	Active.
==== JLA ==== This team was formed in the September 1996 Justice League: A Midsummer's Nightmare written by Mark Waid and Fabian Nicieza. The JLA series, by Grant Morrison, was a return to the "Big Seven", with Superman, Batman, Wonder Woman, Flash (Wally West), Green Lantern (Kyle Rayner), Aquaman and J'onn J'onzz. New to the team were:
Green Lantern	Kyle Rayner	Justice League: A Midsummer's Nightmare #3	Active in the Green Lantern Corps.
Tomorrow Woman	Clara Kendall	JLA #5	Destroyed in JLA #5 and revived as a human in Trinity #52. The Empress in Justice Arcana.
Aztek	Uno / Curt Falconer	Aztek #10	Deceased in JLA #41.
Green Arrow	Connor Hawke	JLA #9	Active.
Oracle	Barbara Gordon	JLA #16	Active as Batgirl.
Plastic Man	Patrick O'Brien	JLA #16	Active. The Fool in Justice Arcana.
Steel	John Henry Irons	JLA #16	Active.
Zauriel	—	JLA #16	Active.
Wonder Woman	Hippolyta of Themyscira	JLA #16	Active as the Queen of the Amazons.
Big Barda	Barda Free	JLA #17	Deceased in Death of the New Gods #1. Resurrected, but then displaced to Earth-51, in Final Crisis #7.
Hourman	Matthew Tyler	JLA #26	Defunct in JSA #66.
Jade	Jennie-Lynn Hayden	Made reserve in JLA #27	Deceased in Rann/Thanagar War: Infinite Crisis Special #1. Resurrected in Blackest Night #8. Active.
Antaeus	Mark Antaeus	JLA: Superpower	Deceased in JLA: Superpower
Jesse Quick	Jesse Chambers	The Flash (vol. 2) #140	Active.
Dark Flash	Walter West	JLA #33	Last seen traveling through Hypertime to find his home dimension in The Flash (vol. 2) #159.
Moon Maiden	Laura Klein	JLA Giant Size Special #3	Retconned into the Silver Age team. Whereabouts unknown.
Nightwing / Batman	Dick Grayson	JLA #69	Active as Nightwing.
Faith		JLA #69	Active.
Hawkgirl	Kendra Saunders	JLA #69	Deceased in Blackest Night #1. Folded into the resurrected Shiera Hall. One of The Lovers in Justice Arcana.
Jason Blood (Etrigan)	—	JLA #69	Active.
Green Lantern	John Stewart	JLA #76	Active in the Green Lantern Corps. Previously filled in for Hal Jordan in 1970s comics.
Manitou Raven	—	JLA #78	Deceased in Justice League Elite #8.
==== Justice League Elite ==== Sister Superior organized the JL Elite for missions the JLA refused to do. Included JLA past core member Green Arrow, as well as JLA members Flash (Wally West), Manitou Raven and Major Disaster.
Sister Superior	Vera Black	JLA #100	Whereabouts unknown.
Menagerie	Sonja (last name unrevealed)	JLA #100	Last seen in Justice League custody.
Coldcast	Nathan Jones	JLA #100	Whereabouts unknown.
Naif al-Sheikh	—	Justice League Elite #1	Whereabouts unknown.
Kasumi	Cassandra Cain	Justice League Elite #1	Active in Batman Inc. as Blackbat.
Manitou Dawn	—	Justice League Elite #1	Active.
==== Post-Infinite Crisis: during 52 ==== Firestorm's brief Justice League from the pages of 52. This Justice League did not operate in any official capacity sanctioned by any previous incarnations of the team or previous members.
Firestorm	Jason Rusch	52 #24	Active. Host Gehenna deceased in Blackest Night #3, currently merged with Ronnie Raymond.
Firehawk	Lorraine Reily	52 #24	Active.
Super-Chief	Jon Standing Bear	52 #24	Deceased in 52 #24.
Bulleteer	Alix Harrower	52 #24	Active.
Ambush Bug	Irwin Schwab	52 #24	Active.
==== One Year Later Recruits ==== A new Justice League of America was formed following the case entitled The Tornado's Path. Every hero who participated in the case was offered membership.
Black Lightning	Jefferson Pierce	Justice League of America (vol. 2) #7.	Originally offered membership in and declined in Justice League of America #173 and reiterated it the following issue.
Red Arrow	Roy Harper	Justice League of America (vol. 2) #7.	Active in the Outlaws as Arsenal.
Geo-Force	Brion Markov	Justice League of America (vol. 2) #7.	Active. The World in Justice Arcana.
==== Justice Arcana ==== In the Trinity series written by Kurt Busiek, a new team is formed based on the Major Arcana, including many other prior League members.
Black Adam	Teth-Adam	Trinity #31	
Black Orchid	Susan Linden	Trinity #31	The Moon.
Brainwave	Henry King, Jr.	Trinity #31	
Citizen Steel	Nathan Heywood	Trinity #31	Active in the JSA.
Crimson Avenger	Jill Carlyle	Trinity #31	Death. Active in the JSA.
Cyborg	Victor Stone	Trinity #31	The Tower. Joins the League proper in Justice League of America (vol. 2) #41. Retconned as founding member post-Flashpoint. Active.
Deadman	Boston Brand	Trinity #31	The Hanged Man.
Doctor Mid-Nite	Pieter Cross	Trinity #31	Active in the JSA.
Gangbuster	Jose Delgado	Trinity #31	Wheel of Fortune.
Green Lantern	Alan Scott	Trinity #31	Active in the JSA.
Lex Luthor	Alexander Luthor	Trinity #31	The Hierophant.
Mister Terrific	Michael Holt	Trinity #31	Temperance.
Nightshade	Eve Eden	Trinity #31	The Moon replacement.
Ragman	Rory Regan	Trinity #31	Justice.
Raven	Rachel Roth	Trinity #31	The High Priestess.
Sandmaster	Sandy Hawkins	Trinity #31	The World replacement. Active in the JSA.
Skyrocket	Celia Forrestal	Trinity #31	
Starfire	Koriand'r	Trinity #31	The Star. Joins the League proper in Justice League of America (vol. 2) #41. Active in the Outlaws.
Stargirl	Courtney Whitmore	Trinity #31	Active in the JSA.
==== Cry for Justice ==== In a mini-series written by James Robinson, Hal Jordan forms a more pro-active league with Oliver Queen and Ray Palmer, as well as new members.
Supergirl	Kara Zor-El / Linda Lang	Justice League: Cry for Justice #3	Active.
Starman	Mikaal Tomas	Justice League: Cry for Justice #5	Active.
Congorilla	William "Congo Bill" Glenmorgan	Justice League: Cry for Justice #5	Active.
==== Post-Cry for Justice ==== New team which also includes Batman (Dick Grayson), Green Lantern (Hal Jordan), Green Arrow (Oliver Queen), Atom (Ray Palmer) and Dr. Light (Kimiyo Hoshi)
Guardian	Jim Harper	Justice League of America (vol. 2) #41	Retired Superman: War of the Supermen #4.
Mon-El	Lar Gand	Justice League of America (vol. 2) #41	Returned to the Phantom Zone, as seen in Adventure Comics (vol. 2) #11. Active in the Legion of Super-Heroes in the 31st century.
Donna Troy	—	Justice League of America (vol. 2) #41	Active.
==== Generation Lost ==== In the maxi-series written by Keith Giffen and Judd Winick, Justice League International is re-established along with several new members.
Blue Beetle	Jaime Reyes	Justice League: Generation Lost #3	Active.
Rocket Red #7	Gavril Ivanovich	Justice League: Generation Lost #4	Deceased.

=== Other members ===
Auxiliary, associate, honorary, and other members of the Justice League
Character	Real name	Non-full membership in	Notes
This section is for honorary and other non-full members.
Snapper Carr	Lucas "Snapper" Carr	Made honorary member, and team mascot in The Brave and The Bold #28	Resigned in Justice League of America #77. Active as a member of Checkmate, briefly a superhero with The Blasters, and later a non-powered friend to the android Hourman. The 1998–99 mini-series JLA: Year One revises this history to include Carr's uncle Simon Carr as a patron of League shortly after they formed.
Sargon the Sorcerer	John Sargent	Made honorary in Justice League of America #99	Killed in Swamp Thing (vol. 2) #50. Appears in issues #97–98, helping the League with a magical enemy Starbreaker. Issue #99 includes an off-hand reference to Sargon being voted an honorary member.
Golden Eagle	Charley Parker	Infiltrates the League Justice League of America #116	Parker is a fan of Hawkman who impersonates him and briefly helps the League in issue 116. In the following issue, the JLAers suggest voting on him as an honorary member but never actually do and instead welcome the actual Hawkman back to the League following a brief leave. Parker later creates the persona of Golden Eagle and makes a handful of appearances, mostly with the Teen Titans before being killed in the "Titans Hunt" storyline. A retconned version of him from the Hawkworld series was later active on Thanagar.
Captain Comet	Adam Blake	Made honorary in DC Special #27	Active in adventuring. Comet is appointed an honorary member by Hawkman while patrolling on the JLA's satellite headquarters. The only time he uses this membership was in DC Special Series #6, published the same month. He would later appear at the wedding of Ray Palmer (The Atom) and Jean Loring in Justice League of America #157.
Sandman	Garrett Sanford	Made honorary in Justice League of America Annual #1	Committed suicide. Death confirmed in The Sandman (vol. 2) #12.
Sue Dibny		Made honorary in Justice League International #24	Murdered by Jean Loring in Identity Crisis #1.
Adam Strange		Made honorary in JLA: Secret Files #1	Active in adventuring. Strange was often a JLA guest star, starting in Mystery in Space #75 and Justice League of America #24. During the Mystery in Space adventure, the Flash thinks, "Terrific! I'm going to propose Adam Strange for membership in the Justice League at our next meeting!" but this never happens in subsequent comics. The Flash does propose him for membership in Justice League of America #4, published one year earlier.
Tempest	Garth	Made honorary in Justice League of America Vol. 2	Killed in Blackest Night #2.
Batgirl	Barbara Gordon	Made honorary after her death in Zero Hour #0	Killed in Zero Hour #0. Note: This was an alternative-reality version of Barbara Gordon (as Batgirl). She was granted honorary JLA membership (in the 1990s crossover "Zero Hour") after sacrificing herself to save Damage during a battle with Hal Jordan/Parallax.
Creeper	Jack Ryder	Made honorary in Justice League International #24	Active.
Retro	Unrevealed	Made honorary in New Year's Evil: Prometheus	Killed by Prometheus in New Year's Evil: Prometheus.
Resurrection Man	Mitch Shelley	Granted probationary in Resurrection Man #21	Active.
Toyman	Hiro Okamura	Made honorary in Superman/Batman #49	Revealed to be an android in Action Comics #865.
Tattooed Man	Mark Richards	Made honorary in Final Crisis #6	Active.
Bulleteer	Alix Harrower	Made reserve member in Justice League of America (vol. 2) #56	Active.

=== Staff ===
Justice League staff
Character	Real name	Joined staff in	Notes
This section covers staff.
Simon Carr		JLA: Year One #1	Financer (fronting for Oliver Queen).
Dale Gunn		Justice League of America Annual #2	Whereabouts unknown. Operator of the League's headquarters The Bunker. He never joins the JLA but accompanies Steel under the direction of his grandfather, the original Commander Steel, Hank Heywood Sr.
Maxwell Lord		Justice League #1	Betrays the Justice League by murdering Ted Kord. Killed by Wonder Woman in Wonder Woman (vol. 2) #219. Resurrected in Blackest Night #8.
Oberon		Justice League #1	Active with the Meta-Movers (Doom Patrol (vol. 5) #7).
Catherine Cobert		Justice League International #8	Whereabouts unknown.
Kilowog		Justice League America #33	Active in the Green Lantern Corps.
L-Ron		Justice League America #42	Active in the Robot Renegades.
Hannibal Martin		Justice League Task Force #1	Whereabouts unknown.
Yazz		Justice League America #95	Deceased. Yazz appears in a monument to fallen members erected by the Martian Manhunter in 52 #24.

== Post-New 52/Rebirth ==
After the New 52 universe was published for five years, DC merged several of their prior continuities again in the DC Rebirth event. The consequent universe contains elements of all previous DC publications.

=== Members ===
DC Rebirth Justice League members
Character	Real name	Team membership	Joined in	Notes
==== The New 52 ====
**Justice League** The Justice League was rebooted in 2011.
**Batman**	Bruce Wayne	**Justice League (Unlimited)**, Justice League International, Justice League of America (Rebirth)	Justice League (vol. 2) #6	Founding member of the Justice League and the second Justice League of America. Unofficial member of the Justice League International. Active as a leader of Justice League Unlimited. Temporal duplicates from Batman: Zero Year and Batman/Superman: World's Finest join Justice League Unlimited in Justice League Unlimited #7 and Justice League Unlimited #8, respectively.
**Superman**	Clark Kent / Kal-El	**Justice League (Unlimited)**	Justice League (vol. 2) #6	Founding member of the Justice League. Active as a member of Justice League Unlimited. Temporal duplicates from Batman/Superman: World's Finest and Superman Blue join Justice League Unlimited in Justice League Unlimited #8.
**The Flash**	Bartholomew "Barry" Allen	**Justice League (Unlimited)**	Justice League (vol. 2) #6	Founding member of the Justice League. Active as a member of Justice League Unlimited. Temporal duplicate from The Flash: Year One joins Justice League Unlimited in Justice League Unlimited #8.
**Aquaman**	Orin / Arthur Curry	**Justice League (Unlimited)**	Justice League (vol. 2) #6	Founding member of the Justice League. Active as a member of Justice League Unlimited. Temporal duplicate from Aquaman vol. 5 joins Justice League Unlimited in Justice League Unlimited #7.
**Cyborg**	Victor "Vic" Stone	**Justice League (Unlimited)**, Justice League Odyssey, **Justice League Red**	Justice League (vol. 2) #6	Founding member of the Justice League and Justice League Odyssey. Active as a member of Justice League Unlimited and Justice League Red. Also active as a member of the Titans.
**Wonder Woman**	Princess Diana of Themyscira	**Justice League (Unlimited)**, Justice League Dark (DC Universe)	Justice League (vol. 2) #6	Founding member of the Justice League; founding member and leader of the second Justice League Dark. Active as a leader of Justice League Unlimited.
**Green Lantern**	Harold "Hal" Jordan	**Justice League (Unlimited)**	Justice League (vol. 2) #6	Founding member of the Justice League. Active as a member of Justice League Unlimited and the Green Lantern Corps.
**Booster Gold**	Michael Jon Carter	Justice League International, **Justice League (Unlimited)**	Justice League International (vol. 3) #1	Founding member and appointed leader of the Justice League International. Active as a member of Justice League Unlimited.
August General in Iron	Fang Zhifu	Justice League International	Justice League International (vol. 3) #1	Founding member of the Justice League International. Active in the Great Ten.
**Fire**	Beatriz da Costa	Justice League International, **Justice League (Unlimited)**	Justice League International (vol. 3) #1	Founding member of the Justice League International. Active as a member of Justice League Unlimited.
Godiva	Dorcas Leigh	Justice League International	Justice League International (vol. 3) #1	Founding member of the Justice League International.
**Ice**	Tora Olafsdotter	Justice League International, **Justice League (Unlimited)**	Justice League International (vol. 3) #1	Founding member of the Justice League International. Active as a member of Justice League Unlimited.
**Green Lantern**	Guy Gardner	Justice League International, **Justice League (Unlimited)**	Justice League International (vol. 3) #1	Founding member of the Justice League International. Active as a member of Justice League Unlimited and in the Green Lantern Corps.
Rocket Red	Gavril Ivanovich	Justice League International	Justice League International (vol. 3) #1	Founding member of the Justice League International. Dies in Justice League International #7.
**Vixen**	Mari McCabe	Justice League International, Justice League of America (Rebirth), Justice Foundation, **Justice League (Unlimited)**	Justice League International (vol. 3) #1	Founding member of the Justice League International, the second Justice League of America, and the Justice Foundation. Active as a member of Justice League Unlimited.
Madame Xanadu	Nimue Inwudu	Justice League Dark (New 52)	Justice League Dark #1	Initially formed the Justice League Dark. Active.
**John Constantine**		Justice League Dark (New 52), **Justice League (Unlimited)**	Justice League Dark #1	Founding member and later leader of the Justice League Dark. Active as a member of Justice League Unlimited.
**Deadman**	Boston Brand	Justice League Dark (New 52), **Justice League (Unlimited)**, **Justice League Red**	Justice League Dark #1	Active as a member of Justice League Unlimited and Justice League Red.
**Zatanna**	Zatanna Zatara	Justice League Dark (New 52), Justice League Dark (DC Universe), **Justice League (Unlimited)**	Justice League Dark #1	Founding member and later leader of the first Justice League Dark; founding member of the second Justice League Dark. Active as a member of Justice League Unlimited.
Shade, the Changing Man	Rac Shade	Justice League Dark (New 52); Retired	Justice League Dark #1	
Mind Warp	Jay Young	Justice League Dark (New 52); Retired	Justice League Dark #3	
**Martian Manhunter**	J'onn J'onzz / John Jones	**Justice League (Unlimited)**, Justice League of America (New 52), Justice League United	Between Justice League (vol. 2) issues #6 and #7	Founding member of the Justice League of America, and Justice League United. Active as a member of Justice League Unlimited.
Batwing	David Zavimbe	Justice League International	Justice League International (vol. 3) #8	Former member of Batman, Inc. Active.
O.M.A.C.	Kevin Kho	Justice League International	Justice League International (vol. 3) #9	Active.
Andrew Bennett		Justice League Dark (New 52)	Justice League Dark #9	
Black Orchid	Alba Garcia	Justice League Dark (New 52)	Justice League Dark #9	
**Doctor Mist**	Nommo Balewa	Justice League Dark (New 52), **Justice League (Unlimited)**	Justice League Dark #9	Revealed to be working for Felix Faust in Justice League Dark #11. Active as a member of Justice League Unlimited.
Timothy Hunter		Justice League Dark (New 52)	Justice League Dark #11.	
Olympian	Aristides Demetrios	Justice League International	Justice League International (vol. 3) Annual #1	Briefly joined the Justice League International before it disbanded.
**Blue Beetle**	Jaime Reyes	Justice League International, **Justice League (Unlimited)**	Justice League International (vol. 3) Annual #1	Briefly joined the Justice League International before it disbanded. Active as a member of Justice League Unlimited.
Frankenstein		Justice League Dark (New 52), Justice League	Justice League Dark Annual #1	
Amethyst	Amaya	Justice League Dark (New 52); Reserve member of the Young Justice League Squad	Justice League Dark Annual #1	
The Atom	Rhonda Pineda	Justice League, Justice League of America (New 52)	Justice League (vol. 2) #18	Revealed in vol. 2 issue #23 to secretly be a member of the Crime Syndicate. Died in Forever Evil #7.
Element Woman	Emily Sung	Justice League	Justice League (vol. 2) #18	
**Firestorm**	Ronnie Raymond and Jason Rusch	**Justice League (Unlimited)**	Justice League (vol. 2) #18	Ronnie Raymond later merges with Martin Stein, then becomes Firestorm on his own. Ronnie Raymond active as a member of Justice League Unlimited.
Steve Trevor		Justice League of America (New 52)	Justice League of America (vol. 3) #2	Founding member and field leader of the first Justice League of America. Active.
Hawkman	Katar Hol	Justice League of America (New 52), Justice League United	Justice League of America (vol. 3) #2	Founding member of the first Justice League of America. Dies in Death of Hawkman #6.
**Katana**	Tatsu Yamashiro	Justice League of America (New 52), **Justice League (Unlimited)**	Justice League of America (vol. 3) #2	Founding member of the first Justice League of America. Active as a member of Justice League Unlimited.
Vibe	Francisco "Cisco" Ramon	Justice League of America (New 52)	Justice League of America (vol. 3) #2	Founding member of the first Justice League of America.
Catwoman	Selina Kyle	Justice League of America (New 52)	Justice League of America (vol. 3) #2	Founding member of the first Justice League of America.
**Stargirl**	Courtney Whitmore	Justice League of America (New 52), Justice League United, **Justice League (Unlimited)**	Justice League of America (vol. 3) #2	Founding member of the first Justice League of America and Justice League United. Active as a member of Justice League Unlimited.
**Green Arrow**	Oliver Queen	**Justice League (Unlimited)**, Justice League of America (New 52), Justice League United	Justice League of America (vol. 3) #4; Justice League (vol. 4) #59	Acted as a spy for the Justice League within the first Justice League of America, joined the Justice League following the Endless Winter event. Active as a member of Justice League Unlimited.
**Green Lantern**	Simon Baz	Justice League of America (New 52), **Justice League (Unlimited)**, **Justice League Red**	Justice League of America (vol. 3) #5	Active as a member of Justice League Unlimited, Justice League Red, and the Green Lantern Corps.
Doctor Light	Arthur Light	Justice League of America (New 52)	Justice League (vol. 2) #22	Killed by Superman in Justice League (vol. 2) #22.
==== Post-Trinity War ====
Nightmare Nurse	Asa	Justice League Dark (New 52)	Justice League Dark #24	Joined to help fight Blight during Forever Evil.
**Swamp Thing**	Alec Holland	Justice League Dark (New 52), Justice League Dark (DC Universe), **Justice League Unlimited**	Justice League Dark #25	Active as a member of Justice League Unlimited.
Pandora		Justice League Dark (New 52)	Trinity of Sin: Phantom Stranger #14	Killed in DC Rebirth Special.
Phantom Stranger	Judas Iscariot	Justice League Dark (New 52)	Trinity of Sin: Phantom Stranger #14	
Zauriel		Justice League Dark (New 52)	Constantine #10	
**Animal Man**	Bernhard "Buddy" Baker	Justice League United, **Justice League (Unlimited)**	Justice League United #1	Founding member of the Justice League United. Active as a member of Justice League Unlimited.
**Adam Strange**		Justice League United, **Justice League (Unlimited)**	Justice League United #1	Died in Death of Hawkman #6; resurrected in Justice League (vol. 4) #1. Active as a member of Justice League Unlimited.
**Supergirl**	Kara Zor-El	Justice League United, **Justice League (Unlimited)**	Justice League United #2	Active as a member of Justice League Unlimited.
Equinox	Miiyabin Marten	Justice League United	Justice League United #5	Allied with the team in Justice League United #0–4 before officially joining in issue #5.
**Shazam / The Captain**	William "Billy" Batson	**Justice League (Unlimited)**	Justice League (vol. 2) #31	Active as a leader of Justice League Unlimited.
**Lex Luthor**		**Justice League (Unlimited)**	Justice League (vol. 2) #33	Active as a member of Justice League Unlimited
Captain Cold	Leonard Snart	Justice League	Justice League (vol. 2) #33	
**Power Ring / Green Lantern**	Jessica Cruz	**Justice League (Unlimited)**, Justice League Odyssey	Justice League (vol. 2) #35 (as Power Ring)	Becomes a Green Lantern in Justice League (vol. 2) #50. Active as a member of Justice League Unlimited.
==== DC Rebirth ====
**Super-Man**	Kong Kenan	Justice League of China, **Justice League (Unlimited)**	New Super-Man #2	Founding member of the Justice League of China. Active as a member of Justice League Unlimited.
Wonder-Woman	Peng Deilan	Justice League of China	New Super-Man #2	Founding member of the Justice League of China.
Bat-Man	Wang Baixi	Justice League of China	New Super-Man #2	Founding member of the Justice League of China.
Robinbot		Justice League of China	New Super-Man #2	Founding member of the Justice League of China.
**The Flash**	Avery Ho	Justice League of China, **Justice League (Unlimited)**	New Super-Man #9	Active as a member of Justice League Unlimited.
**Black Canary**	Dinah Drake Lance	Justice League of America (Rebirth), Justice Foundation, **Justice League Unlimited**	Justice League of America: Rebirth #1	Founding member of the second Justice League of America and the Justice Foundation. Active as a member of Justice League Unlimited and the Birds of Prey.
**Atom**	Ryan Choi	Justice League of America (Rebirth), Justice Foundation, **Justice League Unlimited**	Justice League of America: Rebirth #1	Founding member of the second Justice League of America and the Justice Foundation. Active as a member of Justice League Unlimited.
**Killer Frost / Frost**	Caitlin Snow	Justice League of America (Rebirth), Justice Foundation, **Justice League (Unlimited)**	Justice League of America: Rebirth #1	Founding member of the second Justice League of America and the Justice Foundation. Brainwashed by Deathstroke into leaving Justice League Unlimited and joining the Crime Syndicate. Eventually recovers memories and rejoins Justice League Unlimited.
**Ray**	Ray Terrill	Justice League of America (Rebirth), Justice Foundation, **Justice League (Unlimited)**	Justice League of America: Rebirth #1	Active as a member of Justice League Unlimited.
**Lobo**	Unpronounceable	Justice League of America (Rebirth)	Justice League of America: Rebirth #1	Active as a member of Justice League Unlimited.
**Aztek**	Nayeli Constant	Justice League of America (Rebirth), Justice Foundation	Justice League of America (vol. 5) #25	Founding member of the Justice Foundation.
**Dragonson**	Ahn Kwang-Jo	Justice League of China, **Justice League (Unlimited)**	New Super-Man #20	Active as a member of Justice League Unlimited.
**Mera**		**Justice League (Unlimited)**	Justice League (vol. 3) #24	Active as a member of Justice League Unlimited.
Freedom Beast	Dominic Mndawe	Justice Foundation	Justice League of America (vol. 5) #29	Founding member.
**Extraño**	Gregorio de la Vega	Justice Foundation, Justice League Queer, **Justice League (Unlimited)**	Justice League of America (vol. 5) #29	Founding member. Active as a member of Justice League Unlimited
Insight	Mastrocola	Justice Foundation	Justice League of America (vol. 5) #29	Founding member.
Lorraine Bedy		Justice Foundation	Justice League of America (vol. 5) #29	Founding member.
Strange Visitor	Sharon Vance	Justice Foundation	Justice League of America (vol. 5) #29	Founding member.
Xenos		Justice Foundation	Justice League of America (vol. 5) #29	Founding member.
==== DC Universe ====
**Hawkgirl**	Kendra Saunders	**Justice League (Unlimited)**	Dark Nights: Metal #6	Active as a member of Justice League Unlimited.
Man-Bat	Robert Kirkland "Kirk" Langstrom	Justice League Dark (DC Universe), Justice League	Justice League Dark (vol. 2) #1	Founding member of the second Justice League Dark.
**Detective Chimp**	Bobo T. Chimpanzee	Justice League Dark (DC Universe), **Justice League (Unlimited)**	Justice League Dark (vol. 2) #1	Founding member of the second Justice League Dark. Active as a member of Justice League Unlimited.
**Doctor Fate**	Khalid Nassour	Justice League Dark (DC Universe), **Justice League (Unlimited)**	Justice League Dark (vol. 2) #18	Initially joined as an adviser and became a full-time member of the second Justice League Dark. Active as a member of Justice League Unlimited.
**Hawkman**	Carter Hall	**Justice League (Unlimited)**	Justice League (vol. 4) #1	Active as a member of Justice League Unlimited.
**Mister Terrific**	Michael Holt	**Justice League (Unlimited)**	Justice League (vol. 4) #1	Active as chairman of Justice League Unlimited.
**Plastic Man**	Patrick "Eel" O'Brian	**Justice League (Unlimited)**	Justice League (vol. 4) #1	Active as a member of Justice League Unlimited.
**Green Lantern**	John Stewart	**Justice League (Unlimited)**	Justice League (vol. 4) #2	Active as a member of Justice League Unlimited and in the Green Lantern Corps.
**Starfire**	Koriand'r	Justice League Odyssey, **Justice League (Unlimited)**	Justice League Odyssey #1	Active as a member of Justice League Unlimited. Also active as a member of the Titans.
**Azrael**	Jean-Paul Valley	Justice League Odyssey, **Justice League (Unlimited)**	Justice League Odyssey #1	Active as a member of Justice League Unlimited.
Starman	Will Payton	Justice League	Justice League (vol. 4) #14	Deceased.
Arla Hax		Justice League Odyssey	Justice League Odyssey #14	
Blackfire	Komand'r	Justice League Odyssey	Justice League Odyssey #14	
**Orion**		Justice League Odyssey, **Justice League (Unlimited)**	Justice League Odyssey #14	Active as a member of Justice League Unlimited.
Red Lantern	Dex-Starr	Justice League Odyssey	Justice League Odyssey #14	
World Forger	Alpheus	Justice League	Justice League (vol. 4) #25	Originally from the Sixth Dimension.
Gamma Knife	Suzi Starr	Justice League Odyssey	Justice League Odyssey #21	Erased from timeline in Justice League Odyssey #25.
**Miss Martian**	M'gann M'orzz	**Justice League (Unlimited)**	Titans (vol. 3) Special #1	Initially liaison between Justice League and Titans. Former member of the Titans. Active as a member of Justice League Unlimited.
**Aztek**	Uno	**Justice League (Unlimited)**	Robin 2021 Annual #1	Shown in flashback. Active as a member of Justice League Unlimited.
**Green Arrow**	Connor Hawke	**Justice League (Unlimited)**	Robin 2021 Annual #1	Shown in flashback. Active as a member of Justice League Unlimited.
**Black Adam**	Teth-Adam	**Justice League (Unlimited)**	Justice League (vol. 4) #59	Active as a member of Justice League Unlimited.
Powerhouse	Naomi McDuffie	Justice League	Justice League (vol. 4) #63	
**Queen Nubia**	Nubia of Themyscira	**Justice League (Unlimited)**	Nubia and the Justice League Special #1	Active as a member of Justice League Unlimited.
==== Dark Crisis ====
Aquaman	Jackson Hyde	**Justice League (Unlimited)**, reserve member of the Young Justice League Squad; Justice League (Dark Crisis)	Dark Crisis #1	Active as a member of Justice League Unlimited.
**Blue Beetle**	Ted Kord	**Justice League (Unlimited)**	Dark Crisis #1	Active as a member of Justice League Unlimited.
**Superman**	Jonathan Samuel "Jon" Kent	**Justice League (Unlimited)**	Dark Crisis #1	Founding member of the team following the apparent death of his father. Active as a member of Justice League Unlimited.
**Doctor Light**	Kimiyo Hoshi	**Justice League (Unlimited)**	Dark Crisis #1	Active as a member of Justice League Unlimited.
**Harley Quinn**	Harleen Quinzel	**Justice League (Unlimited)**	Dark Crisis #1	Active as a member of Justice League Unlimited. Temporal duplicate from Harley Quinn vol. 2 joins Justice League Unlimited in Justice League Unlimited #8.
**Robin**	Damian Wayne	**Justice League (Unlimited)**	Dark Crisis #1	Active as a member of Justice League Unlimited.
**Wonder Girl**	Yara Flor	**Justice League (Unlimited)**	Dark Crisis #3	Active as a member of Justice League Unlimited.
==== DC All In ====
**Star Sapphire**	Carol Ferris	**Justice League (Unlimited)**	Justice League Unlimited #1	Joined the Justice League between the events of Absolute Power and DC All In. Active as a member of Justice League Unlimited.
**Air Wave**	Harold Jordan Levey	**Justice League (Unlimited)**	Justice League Unlimited #1	Joined the Justice League between the events of Absolute Power and DC All In. Active as a member of Justice League Unlimited.
**Tuatara**	Jeremy Wakefield	**Justice League (Unlimited)**	Justice League Unlimited #1	Joined the Justice League between the events of Absolute Power and DC All In. Active as a member of Justice League Unlimited.
**Beast Boy**	Garfield Logan	**Justice League (Unlimited)**	Justice League Unlimited #1	Joined the Justice League between the events of Absolute Power and DC All In. Active as a member of Justice League Unlimited.
**Signal**	Duke Thomas	**Justice League (Unlimited)**	Justice League Unlimited #1	Joined the Justice League between the events of Absolute Power and DC All In. Active as a member of Justice League Unlimited.
**Boom**	Judy Garrick	**Justice League (Unlimited)**	Justice League Unlimited #1	Joined the Justice League between the events of Absolute Power and DC All In. Active as a member of Justice League Unlimited.
**Black Lightning**	Jefferson Pierce	**Justice League (Unlimited)**	Justice League Unlimited #1	Joined the Justice League between the events of Absolute Power and DC All In. Active as a member of Justice League Unlimited.
**The Flash**	Wally West	**Justice League (Unlimited)**	Justice League Unlimited #1	Joined the Justice League between the events of Absolute Power and DC All In. Active as a member of Justice League Unlimited.
**Kid Flash**	Ace West	**Justice League (Unlimited)**	Justice League Unlimited #1	Joined the Justice League between the events of Absolute Power and DC All In. Active as a member of Justice League Unlimited.
**Red Tornado**		**Justice League (Unlimited)**, **Justice League Red**	Justice League Unlimited #1	Joined the Justice League between the events of Absolute Power and DC All In. Leader of Justice League Red. Active as a member of Justice League Unlimited and Justice League Red.
**Arrowette**	Cissie King-Jones	**Justice League (Unlimited)**	Justice League Unlimited #1	Joined the Justice League between the events of Absolute Power and DC All In. Active as a member of Justice League Unlimited.
**Atom**	Ray Palmer	**Justice League (Unlimited)**	Justice League Unlimited #1	Joined the Justice League between the events of Absolute Power and DC All In. Active as a member of Justice League Unlimited.
**Batgirl**	Stephanie Brown	**Justice League (Unlimited)**	Justice League Unlimited #1	Joined the Justice League between the events of Absolute Power and DC All In. Active as a member of Justice League Unlimited.
**Big Barda**	Barda Free	**Justice League (Unlimited)**	Justice League Unlimited #1	Joined the Justice League between the events of Absolute Power and DC All In. Active as a member of Justice League Unlimited.
**Boruka**		**Justice League (Unlimited)**	Justice League Unlimited #1	Joined the Justice League between the events of Absolute Power and DC All In. Active as a member of Justice League Unlimited.
**Cadejos**	Andrés Aguilar	**Justice League (Unlimited)**	Justice League Unlimited #1	Joined the Justice League between the events of Absolute Power and DC All In. Active as a member of Justice League Unlimited.
**Donna Troy**		**Justice League (Unlimited)**	Justice League Unlimited #1	Joined the Justice League between the events of Absolute Power and DC All In. Active as a member of Justice League Unlimited.
**Metamorpho**	Rex Mason	**Justice League (Unlimited)**	Justice League Unlimited #1	Joined the Justice League between the events of Absolute Power and DC All In. Active as a member of Justice League Unlimited.
**Nightwing**	Dick Grayson	**Justice League (Unlimited)**	Justice League Unlimited #1	Joined the Justice League between the events of Absolute Power and DC All In. Active as a member of Justice League Unlimited.
**Obsidian**	Todd Rice	**Justice League (Unlimited)**	Justice League Unlimited #1	Joined the Justice League between the events of Absolute Power and DC All In. Active as a member of Justice League Unlimited.
**Ragman**	Rory Regan	**Justice League (Unlimited)**	Justice League Unlimited #1	Joined the Justice League between the events of Absolute Power and DC All In. Active as a member of Justice League Unlimited.
**Rana Dorada**		**Justice League (Unlimited)**	Justice League Unlimited #1	Joined the Justice League between the events of Absolute Power and DC All In. Active as a member of Justice League Unlimited.
**Raven**	Rachel Roth	**Justice League (Unlimited)**	Justice League Unlimited #1	Joined the Justice League between the events of Absolute Power and DC All In. Active as a member of Justice League Unlimited.
**Red Canary**	Sienna Song	**Justice League (Unlimited)**, **Justice League Red**	Justice League Unlimited #1	Joined the Justice League between the events of Absolute Power and DC All In. Active as a member of Justice League Unlimited and Justice League Red.
**Robin**	Tim Drake	**Justice League (Unlimited)**	Justice League Unlimited #1	Joined the Justice League between the events of Absolute Power and DC All In. Active as a member of Justice League Unlimited.
**Sand**	Sanderson Hawkins	**Justice League (Unlimited)**	Justice League Unlimited #1	Joined the Justice League between the events of Absolute Power and DC All In. Active as a member of Justice League Unlimited.
**Sin**	Cynthia Lance	**Justice League (Unlimited)**	Justice League Unlimited #1	Joined the Justice League between the events of Absolute Power and DC All In. Active as a member of Justice League Unlimited.
**Superboy**	Conner Kent / Kon-El	**Justice League (Unlimited)**	Justice League Unlimited #1	Joined the Justice League between the events of Absolute Power and DC All In. Active as a member of Justice League Unlimited.
**Swamp Thing**	Levi Kamei	**Justice League (Unlimited)**	Justice League Unlimited #1	Joined the Justice League between the events of Absolute Power and DC All In. Active as a member of Justice League Unlimited.
**Tempest**	Garth	**Justice League (Unlimited)**	Justice League Unlimited #1	Joined the Justice League between the events of Absolute Power and DC All In. Active as a member of Justice League Unlimited.
**Zealot**	Zannah of Khera	**Justice League (Unlimited)**	Justice League Unlimited #1	Joined the Justice League between the events of Absolute Power and DC All In. Active as a member of Justice League Unlimited.
**Doctor Occult**	Richard Occult	**Justice League (Unlimited)**	Justice League Unlimited #2	Joined the Justice League between the events of Absolute Power and DC All In. Active as a member of Justice League Unlimited.
**Mary Marvel**	Mary Bromfield	**Justice League (Unlimited)**	Justice League Unlimited #2	Joined the Justice League between the events of Absolute Power and DC All In. Active as a member of Justice League Unlimited.
**Atom Smasher**	Albert Rothstein	**Justice League (Unlimited)**	Justice League Unlimited #2	Joined the Justice League between the events of Absolute Power and DC All In. Active as a member of Justice League Unlimited.
**Elongated Man**	Ralph Dibny	**Justice League (Unlimited)**	Justice League Unlimited #3	Joined the Justice League between the events of Absolute Power and DC All In. Active as a member of Justice League Unlimited.
Metal Men	Gold, Iron, and Platinum	**Justice League (Unlimited)**	Justice League Unlimited #3	Joined the Justice League between the events of Absolute Power and DC All In. Active as a member of Justice League Unlimited.
**S.T.R.I.P.E.**	Pat Dugan	**Justice League (Unlimited)**	Justice League Unlimited #3	Joined the Justice League between the events of Absolute Power and DC All In. Active as a member of Justice League Unlimited.
**Envoy**	Xanthe Zhou	**Justice League (Unlimited)**	Justice League Unlimited #3	Joined the Justice League between the events of Absolute Power and DC All In. Active as a member of Justice League Unlimited.
**The Flash**	Jay Garrick	**Justice League (Unlimited)**	Justice League Unlimited #4	Joined the Justice League between the events of Absolute Power and DC All In. Active as a member of Justice League Unlimited.
**Max Mercury**		**Justice League (Unlimited)**	Justice League Unlimited #4	Joined the Justice League between the events of Absolute Power and DC All In. Active as a member of Justice League Unlimited.
**Negative Man**	Larry Trainor	**Justice League (Unlimited)**	Justice League Unlimited #4	Joined the Justice League between the events of Absolute Power and DC All In. Active as a member of Justice League Unlimited.
**Robotman**	Cliff Steele	**Justice League (Unlimited)**	Justice League Unlimited #4	Joined the Justice League between the events of Absolute Power and DC All In. Active as a member of Justice League Unlimited.
Superwoman	Lois Lane	Justice League (Unlimited)	Justice League Unlimited #4	Left upon losing her powers.
**Wildcat / Spectre**	Ted Grant	**Justice League (Unlimited)**	Justice League Unlimited #4	Joined the Justice League between the events of Absolute Power and DC All In. Active as a member of Justice League Unlimited.
**Impulse**	Bart Allen	**Justice League (Unlimited)**	Justice League Unlimited #5	Joined the Justice League between the events of Absolute Power and DC All In. Active as a member of Justice League Unlimited.
**Thunderlord**	Liang Xih-K'ai	**Justice League (Unlimited)**	Justice League Unlimited #5	Joined the Justice League between the events of Absolute Power and DC All In. Active as a member of Justice League Unlimited.
**Green Lantern**	Alan Scott	**Justice League (Unlimited)**	Justice League Unlimited #6	Joined the Justice League between the events of Absolute Power and DC All In. Active as a member of Justice League Unlimited.
**Power Girl**	Kara Zor-L / Karen Starr	**Justice League (Unlimited)**, **Justice League Red**	Justice League Unlimited #6	Joined the Justice League between the events of Absolute Power and DC All In. Active as a member of Justice League Unlimited and Justice League Red.
**Steel**	Natasha Irons	**Justice League (Unlimited)**	Justice League Unlimited #6	Joined the Justice League between the events of Absolute Power and DC All In. Active as a member of Justice League Unlimited.
Batman	Terry McGinnis	Justice League (Unlimited)	Justice League Unlimited #7	Brought to the present from various points in the past and future alongside temporal duplicates of many of the previously listed members.
Green Lantern	Abin Sur	Justice League (Unlimited)	Justice League Unlimited #7	Brought to the present from various points in the past and future alongside temporal duplicates of many of the previously listed members.
Jonah Hex		Justice League (Unlimited)	Justice League Unlimited #7	Brought to the present from various points in the past and future alongside temporal duplicates of many of the previously listed members.
**Red Hood**	Jason Todd	**Justice League (Unlimited)**	Justice League Unlimited #7	Temporal duplicate from his time as Robin brought to the present from the past. Present-day incarnation first shown as a member in DC K.O. #1.
Ultra the Multi-Alien	Ace Arn	Justice League (Unlimited)	Justice League Unlimited #7	Brought to the present from the future.
**Green Lantern**	Kyle Rayner	**Justice League (Unlimited)**	Justice League Unlimited #9	Joined the Justice League between the events of Absolute Power and DC All In. Active as a member of Justice League Unlimited.
**Geo-Force**	Brion Markov	**Justice League (Unlimited)**	Justice League Unlimited #10	Joined the Justice League between the events of Absolute Power and DC All In. Active as a member of Justice League Unlimited.
**The Chief**	Niles Caulder	**Justice League (Unlimited)**	Justice League Unlimited #10	Joined the Justice League between the events of Absolute Power and DC All In. Active as a member of Justice League Unlimited.
**Thunder**	Anissa Pierce	**Justice League (Unlimited)**	Justice League Unlimited #11	Joined the Justice League between the events of Absolute Power and DC All In. Active as a member of Justice League Unlimited.
**Santa Claus**		**Justice League (Unlimited)**	Batman/Santa Claus: Silent Knight Returns #5	Active as a member of Justice League Unlimited.
**Question**	Renee Montoya	Watchtower, **Justice League (Unlimited)**	The Question: All Along the Watchtower #1	Security guard on the Watchtower. Active as a member of Justice League Unlimited.
**Challengers of the Unknown**	Kyle "Ace" Morgan, Matthew "Red" Ryan, Lester "Rocky" Davis, Walter "Prof" Haley, June Robbins, Kenn Kawa	Watchtower, **Justice League (Unlimited)**	The Question: All Along the Watchtower #1	Maintenance workers on the Watchtower. Active as members of Justice League Unlimited.
**Batwoman**	Kate Kane	**Justice League (Unlimited)**	The Question: All Along the Watchtower #1	Active as a member of Justice League Unlimited
**Hawk**	Hank Hall	**Justice League (Unlimited)**	The Question: All Along the Watchtower #1	Active as a member of Justice League Unlimited
**Nightshade**	Eve Eden	**Justice League (Unlimited)**	The Question: All Along the Watchtower #1	Active as a member of Justice League Unlimited
**Blue Devil**	Daniel Cassidy	**Justice League (Unlimited)**	The Question: All Along the Watchtower #1	Active as a member of Justice League Unlimited
**Bumblebee**	Karen Beecher-Duncan	**Justice League (Unlimited)**	The Question: All Along the Watchtower #1	Active as a member of Justice League Unlimited
**Creeper**	Jack Ryder	**Justice League (Unlimited)**	The Question: All Along the Watchtower #1	Active as a member of Justice League Unlimited
**Jade**	Jennifer-Lynn Hayden	**Justice League (Unlimited)**	The Question: All Along the Watchtower #1	Active as a member of Justice League Unlimited
**Mister Tawky Tawny**	Tawky Tawny	**Justice League (Unlimited)**	The Question: All Along the Watchtower #1	Active as a member of Justice League Unlimited
**Omen**	Lilith Clay	**Justice League (Unlimited)**	The Question: All Along the Watchtower #1	Active as a member of Justice League Unlimited
**Shining Knight**	Justin Arthur	**Justice League (Unlimited)**	The Question: All Along the Watchtower #1	Active as a member of Justice League Unlimited
**Bulleteer**	Alix Harrower	**Justice League (Unlimited)**	The Question: All Along the Watchtower #2	Active as a member of Justice League Unlimited
**Alpha Centurion**	Marcus Aelius	**Justice League (Unlimited)**	The Question: All Along the Watchtower #3	Active as a member of Justice League Unlimited
**Pantha**	Rosabelle Mendez	**Justice League (Unlimited)**	The Question: All Along the Watchtower #3	Active as a member of Justice League Unlimited
**Argus**	Nick Kelly	**Justice League (Unlimited)**	The Question: All Along the Watchtower #4	Active as a member of Justice League Unlimited
**Heckler**	Stu Mosely	**Justice League (Unlimited)**	The Question: All Along the Watchtower #4	Active as a member of Justice League Unlimited
**Gangbuster**	Jose Delgado	**Justice League (Unlimited)**	The Question: All Along the Watchtower #5	Active as a member of Justice League Unlimited
**Red Star**	Leonid Kovar	**Justice League (Unlimited)**	The Question: All Along the Watchtower #5	Active as a member of Justice League Unlimited
**Ambush Bug**	Irwin Schwab	**Justice League (Unlimited)**	The Question: All Along the Watchtower #6	Active as a member of Justice League Unlimited
**Etrigan**	Jason Blood	**Justice League (Unlimited)**	The Question: All Along the Watchtower #6	Active as a member of Justice League Unlimited
**Green Lantern**	Sojourner "Jo" Mullein	**Justice League (Unlimited)**	Justice League: The Omega Act Special #1	Active as a member of Justice League Unlimited
**Damage**	Ethan Avery	**Justice League (Unlimited)**	DC K.O. #1	Active as a member of Justice League Unlimited
**Jack O'Lantern**	Daniel Cormac	**Justice League (Unlimited)**	Justice League Unlimited #15	Active as a member of Justice League Unlimited
**Giganta** (Note: Joined the Justice League as part of the group's amnesty program.)	Doris Zuel	**Justice League (Unlimited)**	Justice League Unlimited #17	Active as a member of Justice League Unlimited
**King Shark**	Nanaue	**Justice League (Unlimited)**	Justice League Unlimited #17	Active as a member of Justice League Unlimited
**Starro**	Jarro	**Justice League (Unlimited)**	Justice League Unlimited #17	Active as a member of Justice League Unlimited
**Cheetah**	Barbara Minerva	**Justice League (Unlimited)**	Justice League Unlimited #17	Active as a member of Justice League Unlimited
**Monkey Prince**	Marcus Shugel-Shen	**Justice League (Unlimited)**	Justice League Unlimited #17	Active as a member of Justice League Unlimited
**Sideways**	Derek James	**Justice League (Unlimited)**	Justice League Unlimited #17	Active as a member of Justice League Unlimited
**Galaxy**	Taylor Barzelay	**Justice League (Unlimited)**	Justice League Unlimited #18	Active as a member of Justice League Unlimited
**Dreamer**	Nia Nal	Justice League (Unlimited)	Justice League Intergalactic Special #1	
**Doctor Mid-Nite**	Elizabeth "Beth" Chapel	**Justice League (Unlimited)**	Justice League: Dream Girls - A DC Pride Event #1	Active as a member of Justice League Unlimited
**Doctor Polaris**	Neal Emerson	**Justice League (Unlimited)**	Justice League Unlimited #19	Active as a member of Justice League Unlimited
**Bunker**	Miguel Barragan	**Justice League (Unlimited)**	Justice League: Dream Girls - A DC Pride Event #2	Active as a member of Justice League Unlimited
**Midnighter**	Lucas Trent	**Justice League (Unlimited)**	Justice League: Dream Girls - A DC Pride Event #2	Active as a member of Justice League Unlimited
**Coagula**	Kate Godwin	**Justice League (Unlimited)**	Justice League: Dream Girls - A DC Pride Event #3	Active as a member of Justice League Unlimited
**Stitch**		**Justice League (Unlimited)**	Justice League: Dream Girls - A DC Pride Event #4	Active as a member of Justice League Unlimited
**Rising Sun**	Izumi Yasunari	**Justice League (Unlimited)**	Justice League Unlimited #21	Active as a member of Justice League Unlimited
**Terra-Man**	Tobias Manning	**Justice League (Unlimited)**	Justice League Unlimited #24	Active as a member of Justice League Unlimited
**Elasti-Woman**	Rita Farr	**Justice League (Unlimited)**	Justice League: The Dark Realm Special #1	Active as a member of Justice League Unlimited
**Bat-Mite**		**Justice League (Unlimited)**	Justice League: The Dark Realm Special #1	Active as a member of Justice League Unlimited
**Nite-Mite**	Dyxl	**Justice League (Unlimited)**	Justice League: The Dark Realm Special #1	Active as a member of Justice League Unlimited
**Red Hood Mite**		**Justice League (Unlimited)**	Justice League: The Dark Realm Special #1	Active as a member of Justice League Unlimited
**Mister Dinosaur**		**Justice League (Unlimited)**	Justice League: The Dark Realm Special #1	Active as a member of Justice League Unlimited
**Superboy-Prime**	Kal-El	**Justice League (Unlimited)**	Justice League: The Dark Realm Special #1	Active as a member of Justice League Unlimited

=== Alternate Leagues ===
Other DC Rebirth Justice Leagues
Character	Real name	Joined in	Notes
**New 52 Justice League 3000** A 31st century Justice League consisting of clones of 21st-century heroes, who possess fragments of their original selves' memories and powers.
Batman	Bruce Wayne	Justice League 3000 #1	
The Flash	Barry Allen	Justice League 3000 #1	Dies in issue #2, resurrected in issue #4, dies again in issue #7, and resurrected again sometime before Justice League 3001 #3. Left the team to supervise the Super Buddies 3000. Dies again in 3001 #7.
Green Lantern	Hal Jordan	Justice League 3000 #1	Left the team prior to Justice League 3001 #1 in order to supervise the Super Buddies 3000.
Superman	Clark Kent/Kal-El	Justice League 3000 #1	
Wonder Woman	Princess Diana	Justice League 3000 #1	
Firestorm	Ronnie Raymond and Jason Rusch	Justice League 3000 #4	Left the team in issue #8. Later, assumed charge of Project Cadmus.
The Flash	Teri	Justice League 3000 #9	Genetically recreated with DNA of Barry Allen.
Green Lantern	Guy Gardner	Justice League 3001 #1	Brought back to life in a female body.
**New 52 Super Buddies 3000** A 31st century recreation of the Super Buddies/Justice League International.
Blue Beetle	Ted Kord	Sometime prior to Justice League 3001 #3	Woke up in the 31st century after being frozen.
Booster Gold	Michael Jon Carter	Sometime prior to Justice League 3001 #3	Woke up in the 31st century after being frozen.
Fire	Beatriz Bonilla da Costa	Sometime prior to Justice League 3001 #3	
Ice	Tora Olafsdotter	Sometime prior to Justice League 3001 #3	
The Flash	Barry Allen	Sometime prior to Justice League 3001 #3	Resurrected again sometime prior to Justice League 3001 #3, joined the team to supervise it. Dies again in 3001 #7.
Green Lantern	Hal Jordan	Sometime prior to Justice League 3001 #3	Joined the team to supervise it. Presumed dead after the scullion attack in 3001 #7.
**Futures End Justice League Beyond** The active Justice League from 35 years in the future.
Superman	Kal-El	Batman Beyond (Vol. 5) #9	
Green Lantern	Kai-Ro	Batman Beyond (Vol. 5) #9	
Big Barda	Barda Free	Batman Beyond (Vol. 5) #9	
Aquagirl	Mareena Curry	Batman Beyond (Vol. 5) #9	
Warhawk	Rex Stewart	Batman Beyond (Vol. 5) #9	
Micron	Unknown name	Batman Beyond (Vol. 5) #9	
**Justice League Incarnate** Justice League of the Multiverse.
Aquawoman	Ariel Curry	The Multiversity #2	Originally from Earth-11.
**Batman**	Bruce Wayne	The Multiversity #2	Originally from Earth-17.
Captain Carrot	Roger Rabbit	The Multiversity #2	Originally from Earth-26.
Dino-Cop	Rex Stegman	The Multiversity #2	Originally from Earth-41.
**Green Lantern**	Abin Sur	The Multiversity #2	Originally from Earth-20.
Machinehead		The Multiversity #2	Originally from Earth-8. Dies in Infinite Frontier #6.
Mary Marvel	Mary Batson	The Multiversity #2	Originally from Earth-5.
**President Superman**	Kalel / Calvin Ellis	The Multiversity #2	Originally from Earth-23.
Red Racer	Ray	The Multiversity #2	Originally from Earth-36. Dies in Superman (vol. 4) #16.
**Spore**		The Multiversity #2	Originally from Earth-41.
Thunderer		The Multiversity #2	Originally from Earth-7.
The Flash	Barry Allen	Infinite Frontier #0	
**Wonder Woman**	Maria Mendoza	Infinite Frontier #1	Originally from Earth-6.
Batman	Thomas Wayne	Infinite Frontier #6	Originally from Flashpoint timeline.
The Flash	Avery Ho	Justice League Incarnate #1	
Orion		Justice League Incarnate #1	Quits team in Justice League Incarnate #5.
Doctor Multiverse	Maya Chamara	Justice League Incarnate #2	Originally from Earth-8.
**Future State**
Aquawoman	Andrianna "Andy" Curry	Generations Shattered #1	Active.
Batman	Timothy "Jace" Fox	Generations Shattered #1	Active.
The Flash	Jess Chambers	Generations Shattered #1	Active.
Superman	Jonathan Samuel "Jon" Kent	Generations Shattered #1	Active.
Wonder Woman	Yara Flor	Generations Shattered #1	Active.
Green Lantern	Sojourner "Jo" Mullein	Future State: Justice League #1	Active.
Aquaman	Arthur Curry	Future State: Superman: Worlds at War #1	
Batgirl	Barbara Gordon	Future State: Superman: Worlds at War #1	
Cyborg	Victor Stone	Future State: Superman: Worlds at War #1	
Green Lantern	John Stewart	Future State: Superman: Worlds at War #1	
Hawkgirl	Kendra Saunders	Future State: Superman: Worlds at War #1	
Hawkman	Carter Hall	Future State: Superman: Worlds at War #1	
Martian Manhunter	J'onn J'onzz	Future State: Superman: Worlds at War #1	
Nightwing	Richard "Dick" Grayson	Future State: Superman: Worlds at War #1	
The Flash	Barry Allen	Future State: Suicide Squad #1	
Shazam	Billy Batson	Future State: Suicide Squad #1	
Wonder Woman	Diana	Future State: Suicide Squad #1	
**Justice League** + **Sonic League** Featured in the intercompany crossover DC X Sonic the Hedgehog
Batman	Bruce Wayne	Before DC X Sonic the Hedgehog #1	
Cyborg	Victor Stone	Before DC X Sonic the Hedgehog #1	Also a member of the Teen Titans
The Flash	Barry Allen	Before DC X Sonic the Hedgehog #1	
Green Lantern	John Stewart	Before DC X Sonic the Hedgehog #1	
Hawkgirl	Kendra Saunders	Before DC X Sonic the Hedgehog #1	
Mister Terrific	Michael Holt	Before DC X Sonic the Hedgehog #1	
Supergirl	Kara Zor-El	Before DC X Sonic the Hedgehog #1	
Superman	Kal-El/Clark Kent	Before DC X Sonic the Hedgehog #1	
Wonder Woman	Princess Diana	Before DC X Sonic the Hedgehog #1	
Batman	Shadow the Hedgehog	DC x Sonic the Hedgehog #3	Reserve member
Cyborg	Miles "Tails" Prower	DC x Sonic the Hedgehog #3	Reserve member Also a reserve member of the Teen Titans; Wears an armor resembling Cyborg's components
The Flash	Sonic the Hedgehog	DC x Sonic the Hedgehog #3	Reserve member
Green Lantern	Silver the Hedgehog	DC x Sonic the Hedgehog #3	Reserve member
Superman	Knuckles the Echidna	DC x Sonic the Hedgehog #3	Reserve member
Wonder Woman	Amy Rose	DC x Sonic the Hedgehog #3	Reserve member

== In other media ==
=== Television ===
==== Filmation ====
Justice League members from Filmation
Character	Real name	Actor	First appearance	Notes
Aquaman	Arthur Curry	Marvin Miller	The Superman/Aquaman Hour of Adventure 1x01 "Menace of the Black Manta"	
Atom	Ray Palmer	Pat Harrington Jr.	The Superman/Aquaman Hour of Adventure 1x?? "The Atom: Invasion of the Beetle-Men"	
Flash	Barry Allen	Cliff Owens	The Superman/Aquaman Hour of Adventure 1x?? "The Flash: The Chemo-Creature"	
Green Lantern	Hal Jordan	Gerald Mohr	The Superman/Aquaman Hour of Adventure 1x03 "Green Lantern: Evil Is as Evil Does"	
Hawkman	Katar Hol	Vic Perrin	The Superman/Aquaman Hour of Adventure 1x04 "Hawkman: Peril from Pluto"	
Superman	Kal-El / Clark Kent	Bud Collyer	The New Adventures of Superman 1x01 "The Force Phantom"	

==== Super Friends ====
Justice League members from Super Friends
Character	Real name	Actor	First appearance	Notes
Superman	Kal-El / Clark Kent	Danny Dark	Super Friends 1x01 "The Power Pirate"	
Batman	Bruce Wayne	Olan Soule; Adam West	Super Friends 1x01 "The Power Pirate"	
Wonder Woman	Diana	Shannon Farnon; Constance Cawlfield; B. J. Ward	Super Friends 1x01 "The Power Pirate"	
Apache Chief	Unknown	Michael Rye	Super Friends 2x02 "The Antidote"	
Aquaman	Arthur Curry	Norman Alden; William Callaway	Super Friends 1x01 "The Power Pirate"	
Atom	Ray Palmer	Wally Burr	Super Friends 2x05 "Energy Mass"	
Black Canary	Dinah Lance		Super Friends #3	Comics-only
Black Vulcan	Unknown	Buster Jones	Super Friends 2x01 "The Whirlpool"	
Cyborg	Victor Stone	Ernie Hudson	Super Friends 8x01 "The Seeds of Doom"	
Doctor Fate	Kent Nelson		Super Powers #1	Comics-only
El Dorado	Unknown	Fernando Escandon	Super Friends 5x30 "Alien Mummy"	
Elongated Man	Ralph Dibny		Limited Collectors' Edition #C-41	Comics-only
Firestorm	Ronnie Raymond	Mark L. Taylor	Super Friends 7x01 "The Bride of Darkseid (Part 1)"	
Flash	Barry Allen	Ted Knight; Jack Angel	Super Friends 1x07 "Too Hot to Handle"	
Gleek		Michael Bell	Super Friends 2x01 "Joy Ride"	
Green Arrow	Oliver Queen	Norman Alden	Super Friends 1x14 "Gulliver's Giant Goof"	
Green Lantern	Hal Jordan	Michael Rye	Super Friends 2x06 "Flood of Diamonds"	
Hawkgirl	Shayera Thal	Shannon Farnon	Super Friends 2x03 "Space Emergency"	
Hawkman	Katar Hol	Jack Angel	Super Friends 2x03 "Space Emergency"	
Jayna		Liberty Williams; B. J. Ward	Super Friends 2x01 "Joy Ride"	
Martian Manhunter	J'onn J'onzz		Limited Collectors' Edition #C-41	Comics-only
Marvin White		Frank Welker	Super Friends 1x01 "The Power Pirate"	
Plastic Man	Eel O'Brian	Norman Alden	Super Friends 1x03 "Professor Goodfellow's G.E.E.C."	
Red Tornado			Super Friends #8	Comics-only
Robin	Dick Grayson	Casey Kasem	Super Friends 1x01 "The Power Pirate"	
Samurai	Toshio Eto	Jack Angel	Super Friends 2x09 "Attack of the Giant Squid/Game of Chicken/The Water Beast/Volcano"	
Snapper Carr	Lucas Carr		Limited Collectors' Edition #C-41	Comics-only
Wendy Harris		Sherry Alberoni	Super Friends 1x01 "The Power Pirate"	
Wonder Dog		Frank Welker	Super Friends 1x01 "The Power Pirate"	
Zan		Michael Bell	Super Friends 2x01 "Joy Ride"	

==== DC Animated Universe ====
Justice League members from the DC Animated Universe
Character	Real name	Actor	First appearance	Notes
Superman	Kal-El / Clark Kent	Tim Daly (STAS); George Newbern (later series)	Superman: TAS 1x01 "The Last Son of Krypton, Part 1"	
Batman	Bruce Wayne	Kevin Conroy	Batman: TAS 1x01 "On Leather Wings"	
Wonder Woman	Diana	Susan Eisenberg	Justice League 1x01 "Secret Origins, Part 1"	
Flash	Wally West	Charlie Schlatter (STAS); Michael Rosenbaum (later series)	Superman: TAS 2x04 "Speed Demons"	
Martian Manhunter	J'onn J'onnz	Carl Lumbly	Justice League 1x01 "Secret Origins, Part 1"	
Green Lantern	John Stewart	Phil LaMarr	Justice League 1x02 "Secret Origins, Part 2"	
Hawkgirl	Shayera Hol	Maria Canals-Barrera	Justice League 1x02 "Secret Origins, Part 2"	
**Expanded**
All-Star	Olivia Dawson		Justice League Adventures #13	Formerly; comics-only
Animal Man	Bernhard "Buddy" Baker		Justice League Unlimited #13	Comics-only
Aquaman	Orin / Arthur Curry	Miguel Ferrer (Superman); Scott Rummell (Justice League)	Superman: TAS 3x09 "A Fish Story"	
Atom	Ray Palmer	John C. McGinley	Justice League Unlimited 1x01 "Initiation"	
Atom-Smasher	Albert Rothstein		Justice League Unlimited 1x01 "Initiation"	
Aztek	Uno	Chris Cox; Corey Burton	Justice League Unlimited 1x01 "Initiation"	
B'wana Beast	Michael Maxwell	Peter Onorati	Justice League Unlimited 1x01 "Initiation"	
Big Barda		Farrah Forke	Superman: TAS 2x26 "Apokolips... Now!, Part 2"	
Black Canary	Dinah Laurel Lance	Morena Baccarin	Justice League Unlimited 1x01 "Initiation"	
Black Condor	Richard Grey		Justice League Unlimited #17	Comics-only
Black Lightning	Jefferson Pierce		Superman & Batman Magazine #4	Comics-only
Bloodwynd	Unknown		Batman and Harley Quinn (2017)	Mentioned only
Blue Beetle	Ted Kord		Superman & Batman Magazine #1	Comics-only
Blue Devil	Daniel Cassidy	Lex Lang	Justice League Unlimited 1x01 "Initiation"	
Booster Gold	Michael Carter	Tom Everett Scott	Justice League Unlimited 1x01 "Initiation"	
Captain Atom	Nathaniel Adams	George Eads; Chris Cox	Justice League Unlimited 1x01 "Initiation"	
Captain Marvel	Billy Batson	Shane Haboucha (Billy Batson); Jerry O'Connell (Captain Marvel)	Justice League Unlimited 2x07 "Clash"	Formerly
Commander Steel	Hank Heywood III		Justice League Unlimited 1x01 "Initiation"	
Creeper	Jack Ryder	Jeff Bennett	The New Batman Adventures 1x03 "Cold Comfort"	
Crimson Avenger	Lee Travis	Kevin Conroy	Justice League Unlimited 1x01 "Initiation"	
Crimson Fox	Vivian D'Aramis		Justice League Unlimited 1x01 "Initiation"	
Cyborg	Unknown		Justice League: The First Mission (2000)	Non-canon
Detective Chimp	Bobo T. Chimpanzee		Justice League Unlimited #39	Comics-only
Doctor Fate	Kent Nelson	George DelHoyo (Superman); Oded Fehr (Justice League)	Superman: TAS 2x19 "The Hands of Fate"	
Doctor Light	Kimiyo Hoshi	Lauren Tom	Justice League Unlimited 1x01 "Initiation"	
Doctor Mid-Nite	Charles McNider		Justice League Unlimited 1x01 "Initiation"	
Doctor Occult	Richard Occult		Justice League Unlimited #14	Comics-only
Dove	Donald Hall	Jason Hervey	Justice League Unlimited 1x01 "Initiation"	
Elongated Man	Ralph Dibny	Jeremy Piven	Justice League Unlimited 1x01 "Initiation"	
Etrigan	Jason Blood	Billy Zane (Batman); Michael T. Weiss (Justice League); Kevin Conroy (Unlimited); Dee Bradley Baker (young)	The New Batman Adventures 1x10 "The Demon Within"	
Fire	Beatriz da Costa	Maria Canals-Barrera	Justice League Unlimited 1x01 "Initiation"	
Firestorm	Ronnie Raymond		Justice League Unlimited #20	Comics-only
Flying Fox	Unknown		Justice League Unlimited #29	Comics-only
Green Arrow	Oliver Queen	Kin Shriner	Justice League Unlimited 1x01 "Initiation"	
Green Lantern	Alan Scott		Adventures in the DC Universe #4	Comics-only
Green Lantern	Guy Gardner		Justice League vs. the Fatal Five (2019)	
Green Lantern	Hal Jordan	Adam Baldwin	Justice League Unlimited 1x13 "The Once and Future Thing, Part 2: Time, Warped"	Formerly
Green Lantern	Jessica Cruz	Diane Guerrero	Justice League vs. the Fatal Five (2019)	
Green Lantern	Kyle Rayner	Michael P. Greco (Superman); Will Friedle (Unlimited)	Superman: TAS 3x07 "In Brightest Day..."	Formerly
Gypsy	Cynthia Reynolds		Justice League Unlimited 1x01 "Initiation"	
Hawk	Hank Hall	Fred Savage	Justice League Unlimited 1x01 "Initiation"	
Hourman	Rick Tyler		Justice League Unlimited 1x01 "Initiation"	
Huntress	Helena Bertinelli	Amy Acker	Justice League Unlimited 1x01 "Initiation"	Formerly
Ice	Tora Olafsdotter		Justice League Unlimited 1x01 "Initiation"	
Impulse	Bart Allen		Justice League: The First Mission (2000)	Non-canon
Johnny Thunder	John Thunder		Justice League Unlimited 1x01 "Initiation"	
Lobo		Brad Garrett; Kevin Michael Richardson (Lobo 2000)	Superman: TAS 1x09 "The Main Man, Part 1"	Formerly
Long Shadow		Gregg Rainwater	Justice League Unlimited 1x09 "Ultimatum"	Formerly
Mary Marvel	Mary Batson		Adventures in the DC Universe #7	Comics-only
Metamorpho	Rex Mason	Tom Sizemore	Justice League 1x22 "Metamorphosis, Part 1"	
Miss Martian	M'gann M'orzz	Daniela Bobadilla	Justice League vs. the Fatal Five (2019)	
Mister Miracle	Scott Free	Ioan Gruffudd; Zack Shada (young)	Superman: TAS 2x25 "Apokolips... Now!, Part 1"	
Mister Terrific	Michael Holt	Michael Beach; Kevin Michael Richardson	Justice League Unlimited 1x01 "Initiation"	
Nemesis	Tom Tresser		Justice League Unlimited 1x01 "Initiation"	
Obsidian	Todd Rice		Justice League Unlimited 1x01 "Initiation"	
Orion		Steve Sandor (Superman); Ron Perlman (Justice League)	Superman: TAS 2x25 "Apokolips... Now!, Part 1"	
Phantom Stranger	Unknown		Batman: Gotham Adventures #33	Comics-only
Plastic Man	Eel O'Brian		Justice League Unlimited 1x07 "The Greatest Story Never Told"	Mentioned only
Power Girl	Karen Starr		Superman & Batman Magazine #1	Comics-only
Question	Vic Sage	Jeffrey Combs	Justice League Unlimited 1x01 "Initiation"	
Ragman	Rory Regan		Justice League Unlimited #15	Comics-only
Ray	Raymond Terrill		Justice League Unlimited 1x01 "Initiation"	
Red Tornado		Peter Onorati; Powers Boothe	Justice League Unlimited 1x01 "Initiation"	
Robin	Dick Grayson	Loren Lester; Joey Simmrin (young)	Batman: TAS 1x19 "Fear of Victory"	Non-canon
Rocket Red	Yuri (last name unknown)		Justice League Unlimited 1x01 "Initiation"	
Sand	Sandy Hawkins		Justice League Unlimited 1x01 "Initiation"	
Shining Knight	Justin Arthur	Chris Cox	Justice League Unlimited 1x01 "Initiation"	
Speedy	Roy Harper	Mike Erwin	Justice League Unlimited 3x07 "Patriot Act"	
Star Boy	Thom Kallor	Elyes Gabel	Justice League vs. the Fatal Five (2019)	Deceased
Stargirl	Courtney Whitmore	Giselle Loren	Justice League Unlimited 1x01 "Initiation"	
Starman	Gavyn		Justice League Unlimited 1x01 "Initiation"	
Steel	John Henry Irons	Michael Dorn (Superman); Phil LaMarr (Unlimited)	Superman: TAS 2x21 "Prototype"	
S.T.R.I.P.E.	Pat Dugan	Phil LaMarr	Justice League Unlimited 1x01 "Initiation"	
Supergirl	Kara In-Ze / Kara Kent	Nicholle Tom	Superman: TAS 2x37 "Little Girl Lost, Part 1"	Formerly
Swamp Thing	Alec Holland		Justice League 2x21 "Comfort and Joy"	
Triumph	William MacIntyre		DC Animated Universe (comics)	Comics-only
Thunderbolt	Yz		Justice League Unlimited 1x01 "Initiation"	
Vibe	Paco Ramone		Justice League Unlimited 1x01 "Initiation"	
Vixen	Mari McCabe	Gina Torres	Justice League Unlimited 1x01 "Initiation"	
Vigilante	Gregory Saunders	Michael Rosenbaum; Nathan Fillion	Justice League Unlimited 1x01 "Initiation"	
Waverider	Matthew Ryder		Justice League Unlimited 1x01 "Initiation"	
Wildcat	Ted Grant	Dennis Farina	Justice League Unlimited 1x01 "Initiation"	
Zatanna	Zatanna Zatara	Julie Brown; Stacy Randall; Jennifer Hale; Juliet Landau	Batman: TAS 1x50 "Zatanna"	
Zauriel			Justice League Unlimited #7	Comics-only
**Unlimited**
Superman	Kal-El / Clark Kent	Christopher McDonald	Superman: TAS 1x01 "The Last Son of Krypton, Part 1"	
Aquagirl	Mareena	Jodi Benson	Batman Beyond 3x07 "The Call, Part 1"	
Batman	Terry McGinnis	Will Friedle	Batman Beyond 1x01 "Rebirth, Part 1"	
Big Barda		Farrah Forke	Superman: TAS 2x26 "Apokolips... Now!, Part 2"	
Black Adam	Teth-Adam		Adventures in the DC Universe #7	Comics-only
Captain Marvel	Billy Batson	Shane Haboucha (Billy Batson); Jerry O'Connell (Captain Marvel)	Justice League Unlimited 2x07 "Clash"	
Captain Marvel Jr.	Freddy Freeman		Adventures in the DC Universe #7	Comics-only
Flash	Danica Williams		Batman Beyond Unlimited #13	Comics-only
Gear	Richie Foley	Jason Marsden	Static Shock 1x01 "Shock to the System"	
Green Lantern	Kai-Ro	Lauren Tom	Batman Beyond 3x07 "The Call, Part 1"	
Mary Marvel	Mary Batson		Adventures in the DC Universe #7	Comics-only
Micron	Unknown	Wayne Brady	Batman Beyond 3x07 "The Call, Part 1"	
Mister Miracle	Scott Free	Zack Shada (young); Ioan Gruffudd (adult)	Superman: TAS 2x25 "Apokolips... Now!, Part 1"	
Shazam			Adventures in the DC Universe #7	Comics-only
Starfire	Koriand'r		Batman Beyond Unlimited #15	Comics-only
Static	Virgil Hawkins	Phil LaMarr	Static Shock 1x01 "Shock to the System"	
Superboy	Ur-Zod		Justice League Beyond 2.0 #4	Comics-only
Warhawk	Rex Stewart	Peter Onorati	Batman Beyond 3x07 "The Call, Part 1"	

==== The Batman ====
Justice League members from The Batman
Character	Real name	Actor	First appearance	Notes
Batman	Bruce Wayne	Rino Romano	The Batman 1x01 "The Bat in the Belfry"	
Flash	Barry Allen	Charlie Schlatter	The Batman 4x13 "The Joining (Part 2)"	
Green Arrow	Oliver Queen	Chris Hardwick	The Batman 4x13 "The Joining (Part 2)"	
Green Lantern	Hal Jordan	Dermot Mulroney	The Batman 4x13 "The Joining (Part 2)"	
Hawkman	Katar Hol	Robert Patrick	The Batman 4x13 "The Joining (Part 2)"	
Martian Manhunter	J'onn J'onzz	Dorian Harewood	The Batman 4x12 "The Joining (Part 1)"	
Superman	Kal-El / Clark Kent	George Newbern	The Batman 5x01 "The Batman/Superman Story"	

==== Smallville ====
Justice League and Watchtower Network members from Smallville
Character	Real name	Actor	First appearance	Notes
Superman	Kal-El / Clark Kent	Tom Welling	Smallville 1x01 "Pilot"	
Aquaman	Orin / Arthur Curry	Alan Ritchson	Smallville 1x06 "Hourglass" (vision; corpse) Smallville 5x04 "Aqua"	
Batman	Bruce Wayne		Smallville 1x06 "Hourglass" (vision; corpse) Smallville Season 11 #5	
Black Canary	Dinah Lance	Alaina Huffman	Smallville 7x11 "Siren"	
Blue Beetle	Jaime Reyes	Jaren Bartlett	Smallville 10x18 "Booster"	
Booster Gold	Michael Carter	Eric Martsolf	Smallville 10x18 "Booster"	
Cyborg	Victor Stone	Lee Thompson Young	Smallville 5x15 "Cyborg"	
Emil Hamilton		Alessandro Juliani	Smallville 8x12 "Bulletproof"	
Flash	Barry Allen		Smallville 1x06 "Hourglass"	Vision; corpse
Green Arrow	Oliver Queen	Justin Hartley	Smallville 6x02 "Sneeze"	
Green Lantern	John Stewart		Smallville 1x06 "Hourglass" (vision; corpse) Smallville: Lantern #1	
Hawkman	Katar Hol		Smallville 1x06 "Hourglass"	Vision; corpse
Impulse	Bart Allen	Kyle Gallner	Smallville 4x05 "Run"	Deceased
Jayna		Allison Scagliotti	Smallville 9x08 "Idol"	
Lois Lane		Erica Durance	Smallville 4x01 "Crusade"	
Martian Manhunter	J'onn J'onzz	Phil Morris	Smallville 6x08 "Static"	
Miss Martian	M'gann M'orzz		Smallville Season 11 Special #1	Comics-only
Red Tornado	Lutessa Luthor	Cassidy Freeman	Smallville 8x01 "Odyssey"	Also known as Tess Mercer or Watchtower
Speedy	Mia Dearden	Elise Gatien	Smallville 9x06 "Crossfire"	
Stargirl	Courtney Whitmore	Britt Irvin	Smallville 9x11 "Absolute Justice, Part 1"	
Superboy	LX-15 / Conner Kent	Jakob Davies; Connor Stanhope; Lucas Grabeel	Smallville 10x01 "Lazarus"	
Supergirl	Kara Zor-El / Kara Kent	Laura Vandervoort	Smallville 7x01 "Bizarro"	
Watchtower	Chloe Sullivan-Queen	Allison Mack	Smallville 1x01 "Pilot"	
Wonder Woman	Diana		Smallville 1x06 "Hourglass" (vision; corpse) Smallville Season 11 #16	
Zan		David Gallagher	Smallville 9x08 "Idol"	
Zatanna	Zatanna Zatara	Serinda Swan	Smallville 8x17 "Hex"	

==== Teen Titans and Teen Titans Go! ====
Justice League members from Teen Titans and Teen Titans Go!
Character	Real name	Actor	First appearance	Notes
**Teen Titans**
Superman	Kal-El / Clark Kent		Teen Titans Go! #45	Comics-only
Batman	Bruce Wayne		Teen Titans 3x05 "Haunted"	
Wonder Woman	Diana		Teen Titans Go! #36	Comics-only
Atom	Ray Palmer		Teen Titans Go! #45	Comics-only
Black Canary	Dinah Laurel Lance		Teen Titans Go! #45	Comics-only
Captain Atom	Nathaniel Adams		Teen Titans Go! #45	Comics-only
Flash	Barry Allen		Teen Titans Go! #45	Comics-only
Green Lantern	John Stewart		Teen Titans Go! #45	Comics-only
Hawkgirl	Shayera Hol		Teen Titans Go! #45	Comics-only
Martian Manhunter	J'onn J'onzz		Teen Titans Go! #45	Comics-only
Mary Marvel	Mary Batson		Teen Titans Go! #45	Comics-only
Speedy	Roy Harper	Mike Erwin	Teen Titans 2x09 "Winner Take All"	
Supergirl	Kara Zor-El		Teen Titans Go! #45	Comics-only
Zatanna	Zatanna Zatara		Teen Titans Go! #45	Comics-only
**Teen Titans Go!**
Superman	Kal-El / Clark Kent	Nicolas Cage	Teen Titans Go! 1x33 "Sidekick"	
Batman	Bruce Wayne	Jimmy Kimmel; Kal-El Cage (young)	Teen Titans Go! 1x01 "Legendary Sandwich"	
Wonder Woman	Diana	Halsey	Teen Titans Go! 1x33 "Sidekick"	
Aquaman	Unknown	Eric Bauza	Teen Titans Go! 1x24 "Matched"	
Cyborg	Victor Stone	Khary Payton	Teen Titans Go! 1x01 "Legendary Sandwich"	Formerly
Flash	Barry Allen	Wil Wheaton	Teen Titans Go! 1x24 "Matched"	
Green Lantern	John Stewart	Lil Yachty	Teen Titans Go! 2x30 "Real Boy Adventures"	
Martian Manhunter	J'onn J'onzz		Teen Titans Go! 1x33 "Sidekick"	

==== Legion of Super-Heroes ====
Justice League members from Legion of Super-Heroes
Character	Real name	Actor	First appearance	Notes
Batman	Bruce Wayne		Legion of Super-Heroes in the 31st Century #11	Comics-only
Flash	Wally West		Legion of Super-Heroes in the 31st Century #11	Comics-only
Green Lantern	John Stewart		Legion of Super-Heroes in the 31st Century #11	Comics-only
Martian Manhunter	J'onn J'onzz		Legion of Super-Heroes in the 31st Century #11	Comics-only
Wonder Woman	Diana		Legion of Super-Heroes in the 31st Century #11	Comics-only

==== The Brave and the Bold ====
Justice League members from Batman: The Brave and the Bold
Character	Real name	Actor	First appearance	Notes
Batman	Bruce Wayne	Diedrich Bader	BTBATB 1x01 "Rise of the Blue Beetle!"	Also a member of Justice League International
Aquaman	Arthur Curry, Sr.	John DiMaggio	BTBATB 1x02 "Evil Under The Sea!"	Also a member of Justice League International
Black Canary	Dinah Laurel Lance	Grey DeLisle	BTBATB 1x16 "Night of the Huntress!"	
Fire	Beatriz da Costa	Grey DeLisle	BTBATB 1x02 "Terror on Dinosaur Island!"	Also a member of Justice League International
Flash	Barry Allen	Alan Tudyk	BTBATB 2x06 "Sidekicks Assemble!"	
Green Arrow	Oliver Queen	James Arnold Taylor	BTBATB 1x01 "Rise of the Blue Beetle!"	Also a member of Justice League International
Green Lantern	Hal Jordan	Loren Lester	BTBATB 1x10 "The Eyes of Despero!"	
Martian Manhunter	J'onn J'onzz	Nicholas Guest	BTBATB 2x06 "Sidekicks Assemble!"	Also a member of Justice League International
Plastic Man	Edward O'Brian	Tom Kenny	BTBATB 1x02 "Terror on Dinosaur Island!"	Also a member of Justice League International
Red Tornado		Corey Burton	BTBATB 1x04 "Invasion of the Secret Santas!"	
Superman	Kal-El / Clark Kent	Roger Rose	BTBATB 2x06 "Sidekicks Assemble!"	Also a member of Justice League International
Wonder Woman	Diana	Vicki Lewis	BTBATB 2x06 "Sidekicks Assemble!"	Also a member of Justice League International
**International**
Blue Beetle	Jaime Reyes	Will Friedle	BTBATB 1x01 "Rise of the Blue Beetle!"	
Booster Gold	Michael Carter	Tom Everett Scott	BTBATB 1x17 "Menace of the Conqueror Caveman!"	
Captain Atom	Nathaniel Adams	Brian Bloom	BTBATB 3x10 "Powerless!"	
Captain Marvel	Billy Batson	Jeff Bennett (Captain Marvel); Tara Strong (Billy Batson)	BTBATB 2x01 "Death Race to Oblivion!"	
Green Lantern	Guy Gardner	James Arnold Taylor	BTBATB 1x05 "Day of the Dark Knight!"	
Ice	Tora Olafsdotter	Jennifer Hale	BTBATB 2x24 "Darkseid Descending!"	
Kid Flash	Wally West	Hunter Parrish	BTBATB 2x13 "Requiem for a Scarlet Speedster!"	
Robin	Dick Grayson	Jeremy Shada; Crawford Wilson; Lex Lang	BTBATB 1x18 "The Color of Revenge!"	
Rocket Red	Dmitri Pushkin		BTBATB 3x11 "Crisis 22,300 Miles Above Earth!"	

==== Young Justice ====
Justice League members from Young Justice
Character	Real name	Actor	First appearance	Notes
Superman	Kal-El / Clark Kent	Nolan North	Young Justice 1x01 "Independence Day"	
Batman	Bruce Wayne	Bruce Greenwood	Young Justice 1x01 "Independence Day"	Leader of the Justice League in season 1. Former member of Batman Incorporated.
Wonder Woman	Diana	Maggie Q	Young Justice 1x01 "Independence Day"	Co-leader of the Justice League until 3x26 "Nevermore".
Aquaman	Orin	Phil LaMarr	Young Justice 1x01 "Independence Day"	
Aquaman	Kaldur'ahm	Khary Payton	Young Justice 1x01 "Independence Day"	Former member of the Team as Aqualad. Co-leader of the Justice League until 3x26 "Nevermore".
Aquaman	La'gaan	Yuri Lowenthal	Young Justice 1x08 "Downtime"	Former member of the Team as Lagoon Boy.
Atom	Ray Palmer	Jason Marsden	Young Justice 1x22 "Agendas"	
Batwoman	Katherine Kane		Young Justice 3x01 "Princes All"	Former member of Batman Incorporated.
Black Canary	Dinah Lance	Vanessa Marshall	Young Justice 1x01 "Independence Day"	Leader of Justice League from 2x20 "Endgame" until prior to season 3.
Black Lightning	Jefferson Pierce	Khary Payton	Young Justice 2x01 "Happy New Year"	Former member of Nightwing's team. Leader of the Justice League in 3x26 "Nevermore" and season 4.
Blue Beetle	Ted Kord		Young Justice #20	Deceased
Blue Devil	Daniel Cassidy		Young Justice 1x14 "Revelation"	
Captain Atom	Nathaniel Adam	Michael T. Weiss	Young Justice 1x01 "Independence Day"	Leader of Justice League in season 2 until 2x20 "Endgame".
Captain Marvel/Shazam	Billy Batson	Rob Lowe (Captain Marvel; season 1); Chad Lowe (Captain Marvel; seasons 1–3); Robert Ochoa (Billy Batson; seasons 1–2); Eric Lopez (Billy Batson; season 4)	Young Justice 1x01 "Independence Day"	
Cyborg	Victor Stone	Zeno Robinson	Young Justice 3x10 "Exceptional Human Beings"	Former member of the Team and the Outsiders.
Doctor Fate	Giovanni Zatara	Nolan North (Zatara); Kevin Michael Richardson (Nabu)	Young Justice 1x01 "Independence Day"	Later reserve member (Zatara only). Former member of the Team (Zatanna only). Also member of the Sentinels of Magic (Zatanna only). From 4x13 "Kaerb Ym Traeh!" onwards, mantle rotates between Zatara, Zatanna, Traci Thirteen, and Khalid Nassour.
Doctor Fate	Zatanna Zatara	Lacey Chabert	Young Justice 1x15 "Humanity"	Later reserve member (Zatara only). Former member of the Team (Zatanna only). Also member of the Sentinels of Magic (Zatanna only). From 4x13 "Kaerb Ym Traeh!" onwards, mantle rotates between Zatara, Zatanna, Traci Thirteen, and Khalid Nassour.
Elongated Man	Ralph Dibny	David Kaye	Young Justice 3x23 "Terminus"	
Fire	Beatriz da Costa		Young Justice 3x07 "Evolution"	Mentioned only
Flash	Barry Allen	George Eads (seasons 1–2); James Arnold Taylor (season 3)	Young Justice 1x01 "Independence Day"	
Flash	Jay Garrick	Geoff Pierson	Young Justice 1x08 "Downtime"	Former member of the Justice Society of America.
Green Arrow	Oliver Queen	Alan Tudyk	Young Justice 1x01 "Independence Day"	Former member of Batman Incorporated.
Green Lantern	Guy Gardner	Troy Baker	Young Justice 1x14 "Revelation"	
Green Lantern	Hal Jordan	Dee Bradley Baker	Young Justice 1x01 "Independence Day"	
Green Lantern	John Stewart	Kevin Michael Richardson	Young Justice 1x01 "Independence Day"	
Hardware	Curtis Metcalf		Young Justice 3x01 "Princes All"	Former member of Batman Incorporated.
Hawkman	Katar Hol	James Arnold Taylor	Young Justice 1x01 "Independence Day"	
Hawkwoman	Shayera Thal	Danica McKellar (season 1); Zehra Fazal (season 3)	Young Justice 1x01 "Independence Day"	
Katana	Tatsu Yamashiro		Young Justice 3x01 "Princes All"	Former member of Batman Incorporated.
Ice	Tora Olafsdotter		Young Justice 3x01 "Princes All"	
Icon	Augustus Freeman	Tony Todd	Young Justice 1x14 "Revelation"	
Magog	David Reid	Kevin Michael Richardson	Young Justice 1x16 "Failsafe"	
Martian Manhunter	J'onn J'onzz	Kevin Michael Richardson	Young Justice 1x01 "Independence Day"	
Metamorpho	Rex Mason	Fred Tatasciore	Young Justice 3x10 "Exceptional Human Beings"	Former member of Batman Incorporated.
Plastic Man	Patrick O'Brien		Young Justice 1x14 "Revelation"	Former member of Batman Incorporated.
Red Arrow	Will Harper	Crispin Freeman	Young Justice 1x01 "Independence Day"	Revealed to be an unwitting mole for the Light. Former member of the Team. Later reserve member. Also member of Bowhunter Security.
Red Tornado		Jeff Bennett	Young Justice 1x01 "Independence Day"	Former member of the Justice Society of America.
Rocket	Raquel Ervin	Miss Kittie; Denise Boutte; Cree Summer (Legacy)	Young Justice 1x14 "Revelation"	Former member of the Team.
Steel	John Henry Irons	Zeno Robinson	Young Justice 3x01 "Princes All"	
**Reserve roster**
Adam Strange		Michael Trucco	Young Justice 2x01 "Happy New Year!"	
Alanna		Jacqueline Obradors	Young Justice 2x02 "Earthlings"	
Bumblebee	Karen Beecher	Masasa Moyo	Young Justice 1x10 "Targets"	Former member of the Team.
B'arzz O'oomm		Phil LaMarr	Young Justice 2x12 "True Colors"	Former agent of the Reach as Green Beetle.
Clayface	Matt Hagen	Nolan North	Young Justice 1x08 "Downtime"	Former member of the League of Shadows. Also member of Bowhunter Security.
Delphis		Tiya Sircar	Young Justice 3x18 "Early Warning"	
Doctor Fate	Khalid Nassour	Usman Ally	Young Justice 4x09 "Odnu!"	Also member of the Sentinels of Magic. From 4x13 "Kaerb Ym Traeh!" onwards, mantle rotates between Khalid Nassour, Zatara, Zatanna, and Thirteen.
Dubbilex		Phil LaMarr	Young Justice 1x01 "Independence Day"	
Etrigan	Jason Blood	David Shaughnessy	Young Justice 4x10 "Nomed Esir!"	
Guardian	Jim Harper	Crispin Freeman	Young Justice 1x01 "Independence Day"	Also member of Bowhunter Security.
Guardian	Mal Duncan	Kevin Michael Richardson	Young Justice 1x10 "Targets"	Former member of the Team.
Madame Xanadu	Nimue Inwudu	Cree Summer	Young Justice 1x07 "Denial"	
Mera		Kath Soucie	Young Justice 1x08 "Downtime"	
Phantom Stranger		D. B. Woodside	Young Justice 4x09 "Odnu!"	
Sam Koizumi		Janice Kawaye	Young Justice 2x14 "Runaways"	
Sergeant Marvel	Mary Bromfield	Erika Ishii	Young Justice 4x09 "Odnu!"	Former member of the Team and the Sentinels of Magic. Secretly recruited into the Female Furies.
Tempest	Garth	Yuri Lowenthal	Young Justice 1x08 "Downtime"	Former member of the Team.
Troia		Grey DeLisle	Young Justice 3x01 "Princes All"	Former member of the Team.
Tye Longshadow		Gregg Rainwater	Young Justice 2x05 "Beneath"	
Wyynde		Robbie Daymond	Young Justice 3x20 "Quiet Conversations"	

==== Arrowverse ====
In order of appearance:

Justice League members in the Arrowverse
Character	Real name	Actor	First appearance	Notes
Green Arrow	Oliver Queen	Stephen Amell	Arrow 1x01 "Pilot"	Honorary member; deceased
White Canary	Sara Lance	Caity Lotz	Arrow 1x01 "Pilot"	Also leader of the Legends of Tomorrow.
The Flash	Barry Allen	Grant Gustin	Arrow 2x08 "The Scientist"	Founder and Leader; also leader of Team Flash
Supergirl	Kara Danvers	Melissa Benoist	Supergirl 1x01 "Pilot"	Also leader of the Superfriends
Martian Manhunter	J'onn J'onzz	David Harewood	Supergirl 1x01 "Pilot"	
Superman	Kal-El / Clark Kent	Tyler Hoechlin	Supergirl 2x01 "The Last Children of Krypton"	
Batwoman	Kate Kane	Ruby Rose	Arrow 7x09 "Elseworlds"	Also leader of Team Bat
Black Lightning	Jefferson Pierce	Cress Williams	Black Lightning 1x01 "The Resurrection"	Also leader of his team.

==== DC Super Friends ====
Justice League members from DC Super Friends
Character	Real name	Actor	First appearance	Notes
**Joker's Playhouse**
Superman	Kal-El / Clark Kent	David Kaye	DC Super Friends: Joker's Playhouse (2010)	
Batman	Bruce Wayne	Daran Norris	DC Super Friends: Joker's Playhouse (2010)	
Aquaman	Arthur Curry		DC Super Friends: Joker's Playhouse (2010)	Pictured only
Cyborg	Victor Stone	Phil LaMarr Salazar Fernandez	DC Super Friends: Joker's Playhouse (2010)	
Flash	Barry Allen	Eric Bauza	DC Super Friends: Joker's Playhouse (2010)	
Green Lantern	Hal Jordan	Grant Moninger	DC Super Friends: Joker's Playhouse (2010)	
Hawkman	Katar Hol	David Kaye	DC Super Friends: Joker's Playhouse (2010)	
Robin	Dick Grayson		DC Super Friends: Joker's Playhouse (2010)	Pictured only
Wonder Woman	Diana		DC Super Friends: Joker's Playhouse (2010)	Pictured only
**Webseries**
Superman	Kal-El / Clark Kent	Matthew Mercer	DC Super Friends 1x02 "The Brave & The Bald"	
Batman	Bruce Wayne	Mark Gagliardi	DC Super Friends 1x01 "The Cape and the Clown"	
Wonder Woman	Diana	Rachael MacFarlane	DC Super Friends 1x02 "The Brave & The Bald"	
Aquaman	Arthur Curry	Mark Deakins	DC Super Friends 1x02 "The Brave & The Bald"	
Cyborg	Victor Stone	Bryton James	DC Super Friends 1x02 "The Brave & The Bald"	
Flash	Barry Allen	Yuri Lowenthal	DC Super Friends 1x02 "The Brave & The Bald"	
Green Lantern	Hal Jordan	Wally Wingert	DC Super Friends 1x02 "The Brave & The Bald"	
Hawkman	Katar Hol	Sean Schemmel	DC Super Friends 1x02 "The Brave & The Bald"	
Robin	Dick Grayson	Johnny Yong Bosch	DC Super Friends 1x01 "The Cape and the Clown"	

==== Justice League Action ====
Justice League members from Justice League Action
Character	Real name	Actor	First appearance	Notes
Superman	Kal-El / Clark Kent	Jason J. Lewis	Justice League Action 1x02 "Power Outage"	
Batman	Bruce Wayne	Kevin Conroy	Justice League Action 1x01 "Classic Rock"	
Wonder Woman	Diana	Rachel Kimsey	Justice League Action 1x02 "Power Outage"	
Ace the Bat-Hound	Ace		Justice League Action 1x33 "Best Day Ever"	
Aquaman	Arthur Curry		Justice League Action Run (2017)	
Atom	Ray Palmer	Jerry O'Connell	Justice League Action 1x20 "Inside Job"	
Big Barda		Laura Post	Justice League Action 1x43 "It'll Take a Miracle!"	
Black Canary	Dinah Lance		Justice League Action 1x05 "Follow That Space Cab!"	
Blue Beetle	Jaime Reyes	Jake T. Austin	Justice League Action 1x09 "Time Share"	
Boodika			Justice League Action 1x47 "Watchtower Tours"	
Booster Gold	Michael Carter	Diedrich Bader	Justice League Action 1x03 "Night of the Bat"	
Cyborg	Victor Stone	Khary Payton	Justice League Action 1x03 "Night of the Bat"	
Doctor Fate	Kent Nelson	Erica Luttrell (young)	Justice League Action 1x13 "Trick or Threat"	
Doctor Light	Kimiyo Hoshi		Justice League Action 1x46 "Party Animal"	
Etrigan		Patrick Seitz	Justice League Action 1x14 "Speed Demon"	
Firestorm	Ronnie Raymond	P. J. Byrne	Justice League Action 1x06 "Nuclear Family Values"	
Flash	Barry Allen	Charlie Schlatter	Justice League Action 1x05 "Follow That Space Cab!"	
Green Arrow	Oliver Queen	Chris Diamantopoulos	Justice League Action 1x03 "Night of the Bat"	
Green Lantern	Hal Jordan	Josh Keaton	Justice League Action 1x04 "Abate and Switch"	
Hawkman	Katar Hol	Troy Baker	Justice League Action 1x05 "Follow That Space Cab!"	
John Constantine		Damian O'Hare; Paula Rhodes (young)	Justice League Action 1x04 "Abate and Switch"	
Krypto the Superdog	Krypto		Justice League Action 1x33 "Best Day Ever"	
Martian Manhunter	J'onn J'onzz	Crispin Freeman	Justice League Action 1x02 "Power Outage"	
Mister Miracle	Scott Free	Roger Craig Smith	Justice League Action 1x43 "It'll Take a Miracle!"	
Mister Terrific	Michael Holt	Hannibal Buress	Justice League Action 1x34 "The Cube Root"	
Plastic Man	Eel O'Brian	Dana Snyder	Justice League Action 1x04 "Abate and Switch"	
Red Tornado		Jason J. Lewis	Justice League Action 1x20 "Inside Job"	
Shazam	Billy Batson	Sean Astin	Justice League Action 1x01 "Classic Rock"	
Stargirl	Courtney Whitmore	Natalie Lander	Justice League Action 1x18 "Field Trip"	
Streaky the Supercat	Streaky	Jason J. Lewis	Justice League Action 1x51 "Unleashed"	
Supergirl	Kara Zor-El	Joanne Spracklen	Justice League Action 1x38 "Forget Me Not"	
Swamp Thing	Alec Holland	Mark Hamill	Justice League Action 1x04 "Abate and Switch"	
Vixen	Mari McCabe	Jasika Nicole	Justice League Action 1x17 "Plastic Man Saves the World"	
Zatanna	Zatanna Zatara	Lacey Chabert; Dayci Brookshire (young)	Justice League Action 1x07 "Zombie King"	

==== Titans ====
Justice League members from Titans
Character	Real name	Actor	First appearance	Notes
Batman	Bruce Wayne	Iain Glen	2x01 "Trigon"	
The Flash	N/A	N/A	Doom Patrol 1x03 "Puppet Patrol"	Mentioned only
Wonder Woman	Diana	N/A	Titans 1x08 "Donna Troy"	Mentioned only
Superman	Clark Kent	N/A	Titans 2x01 "Trigon"	Mentioned only

==== Harley Quinn ====
Justice League members from Harley Quinn
Character	Real name	Actor	First appearance	Notes
Superman	Kal-El / Clark Kent	James Wolk	Harley Quinn 1x03 "So You Need a Crew?"	
Batman	Bruce Wayne	Diedrich Bader	Harley Quinn 1x01 "Til Death Do Us Part"	
Wonder Woman	Diana	Vanessa Marshall	Harley Quinn 1x03 "So You Need a Crew?"	
Aquaman	Arthur Curry	Chris Diamantopoulos	Harley Quinn 1x04 "Finding Mr. Right"	
Cyborg	Victor Stone		Harley Quinn: The Animated Series: The Eat. Bang! Kiss. Tour #4	Comics-only
Flash	Barry Allen	Scott Porter (season 2); Zeno Robinson (season 4)	Harley Quinn 1x12 "Devil's Snare"	
Green Lantern	John Stewart		Harley Quinn 1x12 "Devil's Snare"	
Space Cabbie	Unknown		Harley Quinn 2x13 "Something Borrowed, Something Green"	
Tommy Tomorrow			Harley Quinn 1x04 "Finding Mr. Right"	
Vibe	Paco Ramone		Harley Quinn 1x04 "Finding Mr. Right"	
Vixen	Mari McCabe		Harley Quinn: The Animated Series: The Eat. Bang! Kiss. Tour #4	Comics-only
Zatanna	Zatanna Zatara		Harley Quinn 1x03 "So You Need a Crew?"	

=== Film ===
==== Justice League of America pilot ====
Justice League members from Justice League of America
Character	Real name	Actor	First appearance	Notes
Atom	Ray Palmer	John Kassir	Justice League of America (1997)	
Fire	Beatriz da Costa	Michelle Hurd	Justice League of America (1997)	
Flash	Barry Allen	Kenny Johnson	Justice League of America (1997)	
Green Lantern	Guy Gardner	Matthew Settle	Justice League of America (1997)	
Ice	Tori Olafsdotter	Kimberly Oja	Justice League of America (1997)	
Martian Manhunter	J'onn J'onzz	David Ogden Stiers	Justice League of America (1997)	

==== DC Universe Animated Original Movies ====
Justice League members from DC Universe Animated Original Movies
Character	Real name	Actor	First appearance	Notes
**The New Frontier**
Superman	Kal-El / Clark Kent	Kyle MacLachlan	Justice League: The New Frontier (2008)	
Batman	Bruce Wayne	Jeremy Sisto	Justice League: The New Frontier (2008)	
Wonder Woman	Diana	Lucy Lawless	Justice League: The New Frontier (2008)	
Aquaman	Arthur Curry	Alan Ritchson	Justice League: The New Frontier (2008)	
Flash	Barry Allen	Neil Patrick Harris	Justice League: The New Frontier (2008)	
Green Arrow	Oliver Queen		Justice League: The New Frontier (2008)	
Green Lantern	Hal Jordan	David Boreanaz	Justice League: The New Frontier (2008)	
John Henry	John Wilson		Justice League: The New Frontier (2008)	Deceased
Martian Manhunter	J'onn J'onzz	Miguel Ferrer	Justice League: The New Frontier (2008)	
**Crisis on Two Earths**
Superman	Kal-El / Clark Kent	Mark Harmon	Justice League: Crisis on Two Earths (2010)	
Batman	Bruce Wayne	William Baldwin	Justice League: Crisis on Two Earths (2010)	
Wonder Woman	Diana	Vanessa Marshall	Justice League: Crisis on Two Earths (2010)	
Aquaman	Unknown	Josh Keaton	Justice League: Crisis on Two Earths (2010)	
Black Canary	Dinah Lance	Kari Wuhrer	Justice League: Crisis on Two Earths (2010)	
Black Lightning	Jefferson Pierce	Cedric Yarbrough	Justice League: Crisis on Two Earths (2010)	
Firestorm	Jason Rusch	Cedric Yarbrough	Justice League: Crisis on Two Earths (2010)	
Flash	Wally West	Josh Keaton	Justice League: Crisis on Two Earths (2010)	
Green Lantern	Hal Jordan	Nolan North	Justice League: Crisis on Two Earths (2010)	
Jester	Unknown	James Patrick Stuart	Justice League: Crisis on Two Earths (2010)	Crime Syndicate Earth; deceased
Lex Luthor		Chris Noth	Justice League: Crisis on Two Earths (2010)	Crime Syndicate Earth
Martian Manhunter	J'onn J'onzz	Jonathan Adams	Justice League: Crisis on Two Earths (2010)	
Red Tornado			Justice League: Crisis on Two Earths (2010)	
**Doom**
Superman	Kal-El / Clark Kent	Tim Daly	Justice League: Doom (2012)	
Batman	Bruce Wayne	Kevin Conroy	Justice League: Doom (2012)	
Wonder Woman	Diana	Susan Eisenberg	Justice League: Doom (2012)	
Cyborg	Victor Stone	Bumper Robinson	Justice League: Doom (2012)	
Flash	Barry Allen	Michael Rosenbaum	Justice League: Doom (2012)	
Green Lantern	Hal Jordan	Nathan Fillion	Justice League: Doom (2012)	
Martian Manhunter	J'onn J'onzz	Carl Lumbly	Justice League: Doom (2012)	
**Flashpoint Paradox**
Superman	Kal-El / Clark Kent	Sam Daly	Justice League: The Flashpoint Paradox (2013)	
Batman	Bruce Wayne	Kevin Conroy	Justice League: The Flashpoint Paradox (2013)	
Wonder Woman	Diana	Vanessa Marshall	Justice League: The Flashpoint Paradox (2013)	
Aquaman	Orin / Arthur Curry	Cary Elwes	Justice League: The Flashpoint Paradox (2013)	
Captain Atom	Nathaniel Adam	Lex Lang	Justice League: The Flashpoint Paradox (2013)	
Cyborg	Victor Stone	Michael B. Jordan	Justice League: The Flashpoint Paradox (2013)	
Flash	Barry Allen	Justin Chambers	Justice League: The Flashpoint Paradox (2013)	
Green Lantern	Hal Jordan	Nathan Fillion	Justice League: The Flashpoint Paradox (2013)	
**Trapped in Time**
Superman	Kal-El / Clark Kent	Peter Jessop	JLA Adventures: Trapped in Time (2014)	
Batman	Bruce Wayne	Diedrich Bader	JLA Adventures: Trapped in Time (2014)	
Wonder Woman	Diana	Grey DeLisle	JLA Adventures: Trapped in Time (2014)	
Aquaman	Arthur Curry	Liam O'Brien	JLA Adventures: Trapped in Time (2014)	
Cyborg	Victor Stone	Avery Waddell	JLA Adventures: Trapped in Time (2014)	
Flash	Barry Allen	Jason Spisak	JLA Adventures: Trapped in Time (2014)	
Robin	Unknown	Jack DeSena	JLA Adventures: Trapped in Time (2014)	
**Gods and Monsters**
Superman	Hernan Guerra	Benjamin Bratt	Justice League: Gods and Monsters (2015)	
Batman	Kirk Langstrom	Michael C. Hall	Justice League: Gods and Monsters (2015)	
Wonder Woman	Bekka	Tamara Taylor	Justice League: Gods and Monsters (2015)	

==== DC Animated Movie Universe ====
Justice League members from the DC Animated Movie Universe
Character	Real name	Actor	First appearance	Notes
Superman	Kal-El / Clark Kent	Alan Tudyk (War); Jerry O'Connell	Justice League: War (2014)	
Batman	Bruce Wayne	Kevin Conroy (Flashpoint Paradox); Jason O'Mara	Justice League: The Flashpoint Paradox (2013)	
Wonder Woman	Diana	Michelle Monaghan (War); Rosario Dawson	Justice League: War (2014)	
Aquaman	Arthur Curry	Matt Lanter; Dane Jamieson (young)	Justice League: Throne of Atlantis (2015)	Deceased
Cyborg	Victor Stone	Shemar Moore	Justice League: War (2014)	Deceased
Flash	Barry Allen	Justin Chambers (Flashpoint Paradox); Christopher Gorham	Justice League: The Flashpoint Paradox (2013)	
Green Lantern	Hal Jordan	Justin Kirk (War); Nathan Fillion	Justice League: War (2014)	Deceased
Green Lantern	John Stewart	Roger Cross	Justice League Dark (2017)	Deceased
Hawkman	Katar Hol		Justice League Dark (2017)	
John Constantine		Matt Ryan	Justice League Dark (2017)	
Lex Luthor		Steve Blum (Throne of Atlantis); Rainn Wilson	Justice League: Throne of Atlantis (2015)	Deceased
Martian Manhunter	J'onn J'onzz	Nyambi Nyambi	Justice League Dark (2017)	
Mera		Sumalee Montano	Justice League: Throne of Atlantis (2015)	
Shazam	Billy Batson	Zach Callison (as Billy Batson); Sean Astin (as Shazam)	Justice League: War (2014)	Deceased
Zatanna	Zatanna Zatara	Camilla Luddington	Justice League Dark (2017)	Deceased

==== DC Extended Universe ====
In order of appearance:

Justice League members from the DC Extended Universe
Character	Real name	Actor	First appearance	Notes
Superman	Kal-El / Clark Kent	Henry Cavill	Man of Steel (2013)	
Batman	Bruce Wayne	Ben Affleck	Batman v Superman: Dawn of Justice (2016)	
Wonder Woman	Diana	Gal Gadot	Batman v Superman: Dawn of Justice (2016)	
Flash	Barry Allen	Ezra Miller	Batman v Superman: Dawn of Justice (2016)	
Aquaman	Arthur Curry	Jason Momoa	Batman v Superman: Dawn of Justice (2016)	
Cyborg	Victor Stone	Ray Fisher	Batman v Superman: Dawn of Justice (2016)	

==== Tomorrowverse ====
Justice League members from the Man of Tomorrow universe
Character	Real name	Actor	First appearance	Notes
Superman	Kal-El / Clark Kent	Darren Criss	Superman: Man of Tomorrow (2020)	
Batman	Bruce Wayne	Jensen Ackles	Batman: The Long Halloween, Part One (2021)	
Wonder Woman	Diana	Stana Katic	Justice Society: World War II (2021)	
Flash	Barry Allen	Matt Bomer	Justice Society: World War II (2021)	
Green Arrow	Oliver Queen	Jimmi Simpson	Batman: The Long Halloween, Part Two (2021)	
Green Lantern	Hal Jordan	Nolan North	Green Lantern: Beware My Power (2022)	Deceased
Green Lantern	John Stewart	Aldis Hodge	Green Lantern: Beware My Power (2022)	
Martian Manhunter	J'onn J'onzz	Ike Amadi	Superman: Man of Tomorrow (2020)	
Vixen	Mari McCabe	Keesha Sharp	Green Lantern: Beware My Power (2022)	

==== DC League of Super-Pets ====
Justice League members from DC League of Super-Pets
Character	Real name	Actor	First appearance	Notes
Superman	Kal-El / Clark Kent	John Krasinski	DC League of Super-Pets (2022)	
Batman	Bruce Wayne	Keanu Reeves	DC League of Super-Pets (2022)	
Wonder Woman	Diana	Jameela Jamil	DC League of Super-Pets (2022)	
Aquaman	Arthur Curry	Jemaine Clement	DC League of Super-Pets (2022)	
Cyborg	Victor Stone	Daveed Diggs	DC League of Super-Pets (2022)	
Flash	Barry Allen	John Early	DC League of Super-Pets (2022)	
Green Lantern	Jessica Cruz	Dascha Polanco	DC League of Super-Pets (2022)	

=== Video games ===
==== Justice League Heroes ====
Justice League members from Justice League Heroes
Character	Real name	Actor	First appearance	Notes
Superman	Kal-El / Clark Kent	Crispin Freeman	Justice League Heroes (2006)	
Batman	Bruce Wayne	Ron Perlman	Justice League Heroes (2006)	
Wonder Woman	Diana	Courtenay Taylor	Justice League Heroes (2006)	
Aquaman	Orin	Bryce Johnson	Justice League Heroes (2006)	
Black Canary	Dinah Laurel Lance	Jennifer Hale	Justice League Heroes (2006)	
Flash	Wally West	Chris Edgerly	Justice League Heroes (2006)	
Green Arrow	Oliver Queen	Ralph Garman	Justice League Heroes (2006)	
Green Lantern	Hal Jordan	John Rubinow	Justice League Heroes (2006)	
Green Lantern	John Stewart	Michael Jai White	Justice League Heroes (2006)	
Green Lantern	Kyle Rayner	John Rubinow	Justice League Heroes (2006)	
Hawkgirl	Kendra Saunders	Collette Whittaker	Justice League Heroes (2006)	
Huntress	Helena Bertinelli	Vanessa Marshall	Justice League Heroes (2006)	
Martian Manhunter	J'onn J'onzz	Daniel Riordan	Justice League Heroes (2006)	
Supergirl	Kara Zor-El	Tara Strong	Justice League Heroes (2006)	
Zatanna	Zatanna Zatara	Kari Wahlgren	Justice League Heroes (2006)	

==== DC Universe Online ====
Justice League members from DC Universe Online
Character	Real name	Actor	First appearance	Notes
Superman	Kal-El / Clark Kent	Adam Baldwin; George Newbern	DC Universe Online (2011)	
Batman	Bruce Wayne	Kevin Conroy	DC Universe Online (2011)	
Wonder Woman	Diana	Gina Torres; Susan Eisenberg	DC Universe Online (2011)	
Ambush Bug	Irwin Schwab	Tracy W. Bush	DC Universe Online (2011)	
Aquaman	Orin / Arthur Curry	Jens Andersen	DC Universe Online (2011)	
Batgirl	Cassandra Cain	Mindy Raymond	DC Universe Online (2011)	
Batwoman	Katherine Kane	Christina J. Moore	DC Universe Online (2011)	
Black Canary	Dinah Lance	Kelley Huston	DC Universe Online (2011)	
Black Lightning	Jefferson Pierce	Alexander Brandon	DC Universe Online (2011)	
Booster Gold	Michael Carter	Philip Tanzini	DC Universe Online (2011)	
Cyborg	Victor Stone	Alexander Brandon	DC Universe Online (2011)	
Fire	Beatriz da Costa	Shawn Sides	DC Universe Online (2011)	
Flash	Barry Allen	Greg Baglia	DC Universe Online (2011)	
Green Arrow	Oliver Queen	David Jennison	DC Universe Online (2011)	
Green Lantern	Hal Jordan	Gray Haddock	DC Universe Online (2011)	
Green Lantern	John Stewart	George Washington III	DC Universe Online (2011)	
Hawkman	Carter Hall	Jason Liebrecht	DC Universe Online (2011)	
Huntress	Helena Bertinelli	Claire Hamilton	DC Universe Online (2011)	
Martian Manhunter	J'onn J'onzz	Dwight Schultz	DC Universe Online (2011)	
Oracle	Barbara Gordon	Katherine Catmull	DC Universe Online (2011)	
Question	Renee Montoya	Angela Harger	DC Universe Online (2011)	
Red Tornado		Jim Canning	DC Universe Online (2011)	
Steel	John Henry Irons	Billy Brooks	DC Universe Online (2011)	
Supergirl	Kara Zor-El	Adriene Mishler	DC Universe Online (2011)	
Zatanna	Zatanna Zatara	Claire Hamilton	DC Universe Online (2011)	

==== Injustice ====
Justice League members from Injustice
Character	Real name	Actor	First appearance	Notes
Superman	Kal-El / Clark Kent	George Newbern (games); Justin Hartley (film)	Injustice: Gods Among Us (2013)	
Batman	Bruce Wayne	Kevin Conroy (games); Anson Mount (film)	Injustice: Gods Among Us (2013)	
Wonder Woman	Diana	Susan Eisenberg (games); Janet Varney (film)	Injustice: Gods Among Us (2013)	
Aquaman	Arthur Curry	Phil LaMarr (games); Derek Phillips (film)	Injustice: Gods Among Us (2013)	
Cyborg	Victor Stone	Khary Payton (games); Brandon Micheal Hall (film)	Injustice: Gods Among Us (2013)	Also a member of the Titans
Flash	Barry Allen	Neal McDonough (Injustice); Taliesin Jaffe (Injustice 2); Yuri Lowenthal (film)	Injustice: Gods Among Us (2013)	
Green Arrow	Oliver Queen	Alan Tudyk (games); Reid Scott (film)	Injustice: Gods Among Us (2013)	
Green Lantern	Hal Jordan	Adam Baldwin (Injustice); Steve Blum (Injustice 2); Brian T. Delaney (film)	Injustice: Gods Among Us (2013)	
Hawkgirl	Shiera Hall		Injustice: Gods Among Us (2013)	
Hawkman	Carter Hall		Injustice: Gods Among Us (2013)	
Mister Terrific	Michael Holt		Injustice: Gods Among Us (2013)	
Nightwing	Dick Grayson	Troy Baker (games); Derek Phillips (film)	Injustice: Gods Among Us (2013)	Also a member of the Titans
Raven		Tara Strong	Injustice: Gods Among Us (2013)	Also a member of the Titans
Shazam	Billy Batson	Joey Naber (games); Yuri Lowenthal (film)	Injustice: Gods Among Us (2013)	
**Regime Earth**
Superman	Kal-El / Clark Kent	George Newbern (games); Justin Hartley (film)	Injustice: Gods Among Us (2013)	
Batman	Bruce Wayne	Kevin Conroy (games); Anson Mount (film)	Injustice: Gods Among Us (2013)	Formerly
Wonder Woman	Diana	Susan Eisenberg (games); Janet Varney (film)	Injustice: Gods Among Us (2013)	
Aquaman	Arthur Curry	Phil LaMarr (games); Derek Phillips (film)	Injustice: Gods Among Us (2013)	Formerly
Batwoman	Katherine Kane		Injustice: Gods Among Us #6	Deceased
Black Canary	Dinah Lance	Vanessa Marshall	Injustice: Gods Among Us #6	Formerly
Black Lightning	Jefferson Pierce	Kane Jungbluth-Murry	Injustice: Gods Among Us #6	Formerly
Captain Atom	Nathaniel Adam	Fred Tatasciore	Injustice: Gods Among Us #1	Deceased
Cyborg	Victor Stone	Khary Payton (games); Brandon Micheal Hall (film)	Injustice: Gods Among Us (2013)	
Flash	Barry Allen	Neal McDonough (Injustice); Taliesin Jaffe (Injustice 2); Yuri Lowenthal (film)	Injustice: Gods Among Us (2013)	Formerly
Green Arrow	Oliver Queen	Alan Tudyk (games); Reid Scott (film)	Injustice: Gods Among Us (2013)	Deceased
Green Lantern	Guy Gardner		Injustice: Gods Among Us (2013)	Deceased
Green Lantern	Hal Jordan	Adam Baldwin (Injustice); Steve Blum (Injustice 2); Brian T. Delaney (film)	Injustice: Gods Among Us (2013)	Formerly
Hawkgirl	Shiera Hall		Injustice: Gods Among Us (2013)	
Huntress	Helena Bertinelli		Injustice: Gods Among Us #6	Deceased
Martian Manhunter	J'onn J'onzz	Carl Lumbly	Injustice: Gods Among Us #6	Deceased
Mister Terrific	Michael Holt	Edwin Hodge	Injustice (2021)	Formerly
Nightwing	Dick Grayson	Troy Baker (games); Derek Phillips (film)	Injustice: Gods Among Us (2013)	Deceased
Plastic Man	Patrick O'Brien	Oliver Hudson	Injustice: Gods Among Us: Year Three #7	Formerly
Raven		Tara Strong	Injustice: Gods Among Us (2013)	Formerly
Robin	Damian Wayne	Neal McDonough (Injustice); Scott Porter (Injustice 2); Zach Callison (film)	Injustice: Gods Among Us (2013)	Deceased
Shazam	Billy Batson	Joey Naber (games); Yuri Lowenthal (film)	Injustice: Gods Among Us (2013)	Deceased
**Justice League Task Force**
Batman	Bruce Wayne	Kevin Conroy (games); Anson Mount (film)	Injustice: Gods Among Us (2013)	
Atom	Ray Palmer		Injustice: Gods Among Us: Year Five Annual #1	
Batgirl	Barbara Gordon	Kimberly Brooks	Injustice: Gods Among Us (2013)	
Black Canary	Dinah Lance	Vanessa Marshall	Injustice: Gods Among Us #6	
Catwoman	Selina Kyle	Grey DeLisle (games); Anika Noni Rose (film)	Injustice: Gods Among Us (2013)	
Green Arrow	Oliver Queen	Alan Tudyk (games); Reid Scott (film)	Injustice: Gods Among Us (2013)	
Harley Quinn	Harleen Quinzel	Tara Strong (games); Gillian Jacobs (film)	Injustice: Gods Among Us (2013)	
Luke McDunnagh			Injustice: Gods Among Us: Year Four Annual #1	
Nightwing	Dick Grayson	Troy Baker (games); Derek Phillips (film)	Injustice: Gods Among Us (2013)	Deceased Also a member of the Titans
Plastic Man	Patrick O'Brien	Oliver Hudson	Injustice: Gods Among Us: Year Three #7	
Red Hood	Jason Todd	Cameron Bowen	Injustice 2 #1	
Starfire	Koriand'r	Kari Wahlgren	Injustice: Gods Among Us: Year Three Annual #1	Also a member of the Titans
Steel	Natasha Irons		Injustice 2 #5	
Superboy	Kon-El / Conner Kent		Injustice: Gods Among Us: Year Three Annual #1	Also a member of the Titans
Wildcat	Ted Grant		Injustice 2 #7	
Wonder Girl	Cassie Sandsmark		Injustice: Gods Among Us: Year Three Annual #1	Also a member of the Titans
Zatanna	Zatanna Zatara	Lacey Chabert	Injustice: Gods Among Us (2013)	

==== DC Legends ====
Justice League members from DC Legends
Character	Real name	Actor	First appearance	Notes
Superman	Kal-El / Clark Kent		DC Legends (2016)	
Batman	Bruce Wayne		DC Legends (2016)	
Wonder Woman	Diana		DC Legends (2016)	
Aquaman	Arthur Curry		DC Legends (2016)	
Black Lightning	Jefferson Pierce		DC Legends (2016)	
Cyborg	Victor Stone		DC Legends (2016)	
Firestorm	Jason Rusch		DC Legends (2016)	
Flash	Barry Allen		DC Legends (2016)	
Flash	Wally West		DC Legends (2016)	
Green Arrow	Oliver Queen		DC Legends (2016)	
Green Lantern	Hal Jordan		DC Legends (2016)	
Green Lantern	Jessica Cruz		DC Legends (2016)	
Killer Frost	Caitlin Snow		DC Legends (2016)	
Lobo			DC Legends (2016)	
Martian Manhunter	J'onn J'onzz		DC Legends (2016)	
Supergirl	Kara Zor-El		DC Legends (2016)	
Vixen	Mari McCabe		DC Legends (2016)	

=== LEGO ===
Justice League members from LEGO DC movies and video games
Character	Real name	Actor	First appearance	Notes
**Video games**
Superman	Kal-El / Clark Kent	Travis Willingham	Lego Batman 2: DC Super Heroes (2012)	
Batman	Bruce Wayne	Steve Blum; Troy Baker; Kevin Conroy	Lego Batman: The Videogame (2008)	
Wonder Woman	Diana	Laura Bailey; Susan Eisenberg	Lego Batman 2: DC Super Heroes (2012)	
Adam Strange		J. P. Karliak	Lego DC Super-Villains (2018)	
Ambush Bug	Irwin Schwab	Sam Riegel	Lego Batman 3: Beyond Gotham (2014)	
Aquaman	Orin / Arthur Curry	Brian Bloom; Scott Porter; Lex Lang	Lego Batman 2: DC Super Heroes (2012)	
Arsenal	Roy Harper	Crispin Freeman	Lego Batman 3: Beyond Gotham (2014)	Also a member of the Teen Titans
Atom	Ray Palmer	Troy Baker; Brandon Routh	Lego Batman 3: Beyond Gotham (2014)	
Atom	Ryan Choi	Jason Marsden	Lego DC Super-Villains (2018)	
Batgirl	Barbara Gordon	Grey DeLisle; Kari Wahlgren; Kimberly Brooks; Tara Strong	Lego Batman: The Videogame (2008)	
Beast Boy	Garfield Logan	Nolan North Greg Cipes	Lego Batman 3: Beyond Gotham (2014)	Also a member of the Teen Titans
Black Canary	Dinah Laurel Lance	Kari Wahlgren; Vanessa Marshall	Lego Batman 2: DC Super Heroes (2012)	
Black Lightning	Jefferson Pierce		Lego DC Super-Villains (2018)	
Blue Beetle	Jaime Reyes	Dee Bradley Baker; Josh Keaton	Lego Batman 3: Beyond Gotham (2014)	Also a member of the Teen Titans
Booster Gold	Michael Carter	Travis Willingham	Lego Batman 3: Beyond Gotham (2014)	
Bronze Tiger	Ben Turner	Ike Amadi; Kane Murry	Lego Batman 3: Beyond Gotham (2014)	
Creeper	Jack Ryder	J. P. Karliak	Lego DC Super-Villains (2018)	
Cyborg	Victor Stone	Brian Bloom; Bumper Robinson	Lego Batman 2: DC Super Heroes (2012)	
Deadman	Boston Brand	Steve Blum	Lego DC Super-Villains (2018)	Also a member of Justice League Dark
Detective Chimp	Bobo T. Chimpanzee	Dee Bradley Baker	Lego Batman 3: Beyond Gotham (2014)	
Doctor Fate	Kent Nelson	Liam O'Brien; David Sobolov	Lego Batman 3: Beyond Gotham (2014)	Also a member of the Justice Society of America
Etrigan	Jason Blood	Liam O'Brien; Travis Willingham	Lego Batman 3: Beyond Gotham (2014)	Also a member of Justice League Dark
Firestorm	Ronnie Raymond	Nolan North	Lego Batman 3: Beyond Gotham (2014)	
Firestorm	Jason Rusch	Kane Murry	Lego DC Super-Villains (2018)	
Flash	Barry Allen	Charlie Schlatter; Michael Rosenbaum	Lego Batman 2: DC Super Heroes (2012)	
Flash	Wally West	Jason Spisak	Lego DC Super-Villains (2018)	Also a member of the Teen Titans
Frankenstein		Fred Tatasciore; David Sobolov	Lego Batman 3: Beyond Gotham (2014)	Also a member of Justice League Dark
Green Arrow	Oliver Queen	Stephen Amell; James Arnold Taylor	Lego Batman 2: DC Super Heroes (2012)	
Green Lantern	Guy Gardner	James Arnold Taylor	Lego Batman 3: Beyond Gotham (2014)	
Green Lantern	Hal Jordan	Cam Clarke Josh Keaton	Lego Batman 2: DC Super Heroes (2012)	
Green Lantern	Jessica Cruz	Grey DeLisle	Lego DC Super-Villains (2018)	
Green Lantern	John Stewart	Ike Amadi; Nyambi Nyambi	Lego Batman 3: Beyond Gotham (2014)	
Green Lantern	Simon Baz	Taliesin Jaffe	Lego DC Super-Villains (2018)	
Hawkgirl	Shayera Hol	Kari Wahlgren; Tiffany Smith	Lego Batman 2: DC Super Heroes (2012)	
Hawkman	Katar Hol	Troy Baker; Travis Willingham	Lego Batman 2: DC Super Heroes (2012)	
Huntress	Helena Bertinelli	Kari Wahlgren; Sumalee Montano	Lego Batman: The Videogame (2008)	
John Constantine		Gideon Emery	Lego DC Super-Villains (2018)	Also a member of Justice League Dark
Katana	Tatsu Yamashiro	Sumalee Montano	Lego Batman 2: DC Super Heroes (2012)	
Kid Flash	Bart Allen	Sam Riegel	Lego Batman 3: Beyond Gotham (2014)	Also known as Impulse; Also a member of the Teen Titans
Lobo		Travis Willingham; David Sobolov	Lego Batman 3: Beyond Gotham (2014)	
Martian Manhunter	J'onn J'onzz	Cam Clarke; Ike Amadi	Lego Batman 2: DC Super Heroes (2012)	
Mera			Lego Batman 3: Beyond Gotham (2014)	
Miss Martian	M'gann M'orzz	Laura Bailey	Lego Batman 3: Beyond Gotham (2014)	Also a member of the Teen Titans
Mister Miracle	Scot / Scott Free	Roger Craig Smith	Lego DC Super-Villains (2018)	
Nightwing	Dick Grayson	James Arnold Taylor Cam Clarke; Matthew Mercer; Charlie Schlatter	Lego Batman: The Videogame (2008)	Also a member of the Teen Titans
Orion		Nolan North; Roger Craig Smith	Lego Batman 3: Beyond Gotham (2014)	
Plastic Man	Eel O'Brian	Dee Bradley Baker J. P. Karliak	Lego Batman 3: Beyond Gotham (2014)	
Power Girl	Kara Zor-L		Lego Batman 3: Beyond Gotham (2014)	Also a member of the Justice Society of America
Question	Vic Sage	Liam O'Brien	Lego Batman 3: Beyond Gotham (2014)	
Raven		Tara Strong	Lego Batman 3: Beyond Gotham (2014)	Also a member of the Teen Titans
Red Tornado		Liam O'Brien; Peter Jessop	Lego Batman 3: Beyond Gotham (2014)	
Robin	Damian Wayne	Charlie Schlatter; Stuart Allan	Lego Batman 2: DC Super Heroes (2012)	Also a member of the Teen Titans
Robin	Tim Drake		Lego Batman: The Videogame (2008)	
Shazam	Billy Batson	Travis Willingham; Josh Keaton; Zach Callison (Billy Batson); Brandon Routh (Shazam); Asher Angel (Billy Batson); Zachary Levi (Shazam)	Lego Batman 2: DC Super Heroes (2012)	
Spectre	James Corrigan	Corey Burton	Lego DC Super-Villains (2018)	Also a member of Justice League Dark
Starfire	Koriand'r	Kari Wahlgren; Hynden Walch	Lego Batman 3: Beyond Gotham (2014)	Also a member of the Teen Titans
Stargirl	Courtney Whitmore	Tara Strong	Lego Batman 3: Beyond Gotham (2014)	Also a member of the Justice Society of America
Superboy	Kon-El / Conner Kent	Scott Porter	Lego Batman 3: Beyond Gotham (2014)	
Supergirl	Kara Zor-El	Bridget Hoffman; Kari Wahlgren	Lego Batman 2: DC Super Heroes (2012)	
Swamp Thing	Alec Holland	JB Blanc; Fred Tatasciore	Lego Batman 3: Beyond Gotham (2014)	Also a member of Justice League Dark
Vibe	Cisco Ramon	Dee Bradley Baker	Lego Batman 3: Beyond Gotham (2014)	
Vixen	Mari McCabe	Megalyn Echikunwoke	Lego Batman 3: Beyond Gotham (2014)	
White Lantern	Kyle Rayner	Josh Keaton	Lego Batman 3: Beyond Gotham (2014)	
Wonder Girl	Cassie Sandsmark	Kari Wahlgren; Grey DeLisle	Lego Batman 3: Beyond Gotham (2014)	Also a member of the Teen Titans
Wonder Girl	Donna Troy	Julie Nathanson	Lego DC Super-Villains (2018)	Also a member of the Teen Titans
Zatanna	Zatanna Zatara	Kari Wahlgren	Lego Batman 2: DC Super Heroes (2012)	Also a member of Justice League Dark
**Movies**
Superman	Kal-El / Clark Kent	Nolan North	Lego DC Comics: Batman Be-Leaguered (2014)	
Batman	Bruce Wayne	Troy Baker	Lego DC Comics: Batman Be-Leaguered (2014)	
Wonder Woman	Diana	Grey DeLisle; Kari Wahlgren	Lego DC Comics: Batman Be-Leaguered (2014)	
Aquaman	Orin / Arthur Curry	Dee Bradley Baker	Lego DC Comics: Batman Be-Leaguered (2014)	
Atom	Ray Palmer	Eric Bauza	Lego DC Comics Super Heroes: The Flash (2018)	
Cyborg	Victor Stone	Khary Payton	Lego DC Comics: Batman Be-Leaguered (2014)	Also a member of the Teen Titans
Firestorm	Jason Rusch	Phil LaMarr	Lego DC Comics Super Heroes: The Flash (2018)	
Flash	Barry Allen	James Arnold Taylor	Lego DC Comics: Batman Be-Leaguered (2014)	
Green Arrow	Oliver Queen	Phil Morris	Lego DC Comics Super Heroes: Justice League vs. Bizarro League (2015)	
Green Lantern	Guy Gardner	Diedrich Bader	Lego DC Comics Super Heroes: Justice League vs. Bizarro League (2015)	
Green Lantern	Hal Jordan	Josh Keaton	Lego DC Comics Super Heroes: Justice League – Attack of the Legion of Doom (2015)	
Green Lantern	Jessica Cruz	Cristina Milizia	Lego DC Comics Super Heroes: Aquaman – Rage of Atlantis (2018)	
Hawkman	Unknown	Phil Morris	Lego DC Comics Super Heroes: Justice League vs. Bizarro League (2015)	
Martian Manhunter	J'onn J'onzz	Dee Bradley Baker	Lego DC Comics Super Heroes: Justice League vs. Bizarro League (2015)	
Plastic Man	Eel O'Brian	Tom Kenny	Lego DC Comics Super Heroes: Justice League vs. Bizarro League (2015)	
Shazam	Billy Batson	Zach Callison (Billy Batson); Sean Astin (Shazam)	Lego DC Shazam! Magic and Monsters (2020)	
Supergirl	Kara Zor-El	Jessica DiCicco	Lego DC Comics Super Heroes: Justice League – Cosmic Clash (2016)	
**The Lego Movie**
Batman	Bruce Wayne	Will Arnett	The Lego Movie (2014)	Also a Master Builder
Apache Chief	Unknown		The Lego Batman Movie (2017)	
Aquaman	Arthur Curry	Jason Momoa	The Lego Batman Movie (2017)	Also a Master Builder
Black Canary	Dinah Laurel Lance		The Lego Batman Movie (2017)	
Black Vulcan	Unknown		The Lego Batman Movie (2017)	
Cyborg	Victor Stone		The Lego Batman Movie (2017)	Also a Master Builder
El Dorado	Unknown		The Lego Batman Movie (2017)	
Flash	Barry Allen	Adam Devine	The Lego Movie (2014)	Also a Master Builder
Gleek			The Lego Batman Movie (2017)	
Green Arrow	Oliver Queen		The Lego Batman Movie (2017)	
Green Lantern	Hal Jordan	Jonah Hill	The Lego Movie (2014)	Also a Master Builder
Hawkgirl	Kendra Saunders		The Lego Batman Movie (2017)	
Hawkman	Carter Hall		The Lego Batman Movie (2017)	
Jayna			The Lego Batman Movie (2017)	
Martian Manhunter	J'onn J'onzz		The Lego Batman Movie (2017)	
Samurai	Toshio Eto		The Lego Batman Movie (2017)	
Superman	Kal-El / Clark Kent	Channing Tatum	The Lego Movie (2014)	Also a Master Builder
Wonder Dog			The Lego Batman Movie (2017)	
Wonder Woman	Diana	Cobie Smulders	The Lego Movie (2014)	Also a Master Builder
Zan			The Lego Batman Movie (2017)	

== See also ==
- List of Justice Society of America members
