= Our Worlds at War =

2001 DC Comics storyline

- Cover of JLA: Our Worlds at War (September 2001), art by Jae Lee.
- Publication date: August – October 2001
- Genre: Crossover
Title(s)
Action Comics #780-782
Adventures of Superman #593-596
Batman #593-594
Batman: Our Worlds at War #1
The Flash: Our Worlds at War #1
Green Lantern: Our Worlds at War #1
Harley Quinn: Our Worlds at War #1
Impulse #77
JLA: Our Worlds at War #1
JSA: Our Worlds at War #1
Nightwing: Our Worlds at War #1
Superboy vol. 3 #89-91
Supergirl vol. 4 #59-61
Superman vol. 2 #171-173
Superman: Our Worlds at War Secret Files and Origins #1
Superman: The Man of Steel #115-117
Wonder Woman vol. 2 #171-173
Wonder Woman: Our Worlds at War #1
World's Finest: Our Worlds at War #1
Young Justice #35-36
Young Justice: Our Worlds at War #1

Creative team
- Writer(s): Jeph Loeb; Joe Casey; Mark Schultz; Joe Kelly; Phil Jimenez; Peter David; Geoff Johns
- Penciller(s): Mike Wieringo; Ed McGuinness; Doug Mahnke; Ron Garney; Leonard Kirk; Angel Unzueta
- Volume 1: ISBN 1-56389-915-9
- Volume 2: ISBN 1563899167
- Complete Edition: ISBN 1401211291

"Our Worlds at War" is a comic book storyline, published by DC Comics in mid-2001. OWAW was a crossover storyline that spanned several different books, including several books starring Batman, Superman and Wonder Woman, The Flash, Green Lantern, and a number of supporting characters and books. Creators involved in the crossover included writers Jeph Loeb, Joe Casey, Mark Schultz, Joe Kelly, Phil Jimenez, and Peter David, and artists that included Mike Wieringo, Ed McGuinness, Doug Mahnke, Ron Garney, and Leonard Kirk.

== Plot ==
The Our Worlds at War storyline involves the heroes battling Imperiex, a cosmic entity who represents entropy and threatens to destroy the universe.

Thanks to the sacrifice of Strange Visitor and General Rock, Earth's forces crack Imperiex's armor, releasing his energy. However, Brainiac-13 appears with Warworld and absorbs the energy, vowing to use it to rule everything.

In a desperate gambit, Superman dives into the heart of the Sun, thus gaining a massive power boost. Rapidly realizing that Warworld cannot be destroyed without releasing Imperiex and triggering another Big Bang, Superman and Martian Manhunter form a telepathic link with the remaining major combatants — including Darkseid, Lex Luthor, Steel and Wonder Woman — to explain their new plan. Tempest focuses energy through Steel's Entropy Aegis armor, which was created from a burned-out Imperiex probe. The Entropy Aegis is combined with Lex Luthor activating a temporal displacement weapon, which sends Warworld, Imperiex, and Brainiac back in time to the beginning of the universe. Before being destroyed, Imperiex realizes that the imperfection he had detected in the universe was himself.

Several heroes are killed or presumed dead during the conflict, including Hippolyta, Sam Lane, Aquaman, Maxima, Massacre, Jonathan and Martha Kent, and Strange Visitor. Hippolyta, Aquaman, Sam Lane, and the Kents are later revealed to have survived.

== Characters ==
- The Flash
- Superman
- Krypto
- Wonder Woman (Diana, Hippolyta)
- Green Lantern (Kyle Rayner)
- Martian Manhunter
- Aquaman
- The Justice League of America
- Young Justice
- Superboy
- Supergirl
- Imperiex
- Brainiac 13
- Darkseid
- Grayven
- Doomsday
- Lex Luthor
- Suicide Squad
- Manchester Black
- Strange Visitor
- Lois Lane
- Lena Luthor
- Sam Lane

== Publications ==
The story ran through the following issues:

- Action Comics #780-782
- Adventures of Superman #593-596
- Batman #593-594
- Batman: Our Worlds at War #1
- Flash: Our Worlds at War #1
- Green Lantern: Our Worlds at War #1
- Harley Quinn: Our Worlds at War #1
- Impulse #77
- JLA: Our Worlds at War #1
- JSA: Our Worlds at War #1
- Nightwing: Our Worlds at War #1
- Superboy #89-91
- Supergirl #59-61
- Superman #171-173
- Superman: Our Worlds at War Secret Files and Origins #1
- Superman: The Man of Steel #115-117
- Wonder Woman #171-173
- Wonder Woman: Our Worlds at War #1
- World's Finest Comics: Our Worlds at War #1
- Young Justice #35-36
- Young Justice: Our Worlds at War #1
- Superman/Batman #64, #68-71 (a brief new direction of the Superman/Batman series at the start of 2010 that featured a story that took place in the aftermath of Our Worlds at War with #64 acting as a prologue and #68 through #71 being the story proper complete with the trade dress banner).

=== Collected editions ===
The story has been collected into trade paperbacks:

- SUPERMAN: OUR WORLDS AT WAR VOL. 1 | 256pg. | Color | Softcover | ISBN 1-56389-915-9
- SUPERMAN: OUR WORLDS AT WAR VOL. 2 | 247pg. | Color | Softcover | ISBN 1-56389-916-7
- SUPERMAN: OUR WORLDS AT WAR THE COMPLETE EDITION | 512pg. | Color | Softcover | ISBN 1401211291
