= Strange Visitor =

- The Strange Visitor's debut appearance in Superman (vol. 2) #149 (October 1999), art by Ron Frenz.

Publication information
- Publisher: DC Comics
- First appearance: Superman (vol. 2) #149 (October 1999)
- Created by: Randall Frenz; Ron Frenz

In-story information
- Alter ego: Sharon Vance
- Team affiliations: Team Superman; Justice League
- Notable aliases: Kismet
- Abilities: Flight; Electromagnetic field manipulation; Energy manipulation; Magnetic blasts; Aura reading; Intangibility; Power siphoning; Interstellar travel; Empathy

Strange Visitor (Sharon Vance) is a fictional character appearing in American comic books published by DC Comics. She first appeared in Superman (vol. 2) #149 and was created by Randall Frenz and Ron Frenz.

== Fictional character biography ==
Following a lightning strike on a plane, the cosmic entity Kismet and Sharon Vance (Clark Kent's childhood friend from Smallville) became one entity known as the Strange Visitor. She had become a being of pure electromagnetic energy and was drawn to the laboratories of Professor Emil Hamilton, who still had one of Superman's containment suits (from a period when he was temporarily converted to electromagnetic energy). Emil modified the suit to fit her since test results showed that her energy field was dissolving and the suit would help her maintain solid form. Her memories were weak, and even though she easily used her powers to magnetically levitate trains over destroyed tracks, destroy alien attackers with an electromagnetic pulse, and absorb the powers of a self-proclaimed "god of war", she still did not know who she was. A battle with the Parasite restores her powers and her memories.

When the Imperiex fleet attacks Earth during the "Our Worlds at War" event, Strange Visitor sacrifices herself by giving all of her powers to Superman to give him the necessary power boost to defeat Imperiex.

Strange Visitor returns in the sixth volume of Supergirl (2018) as a prisoner of the Department of Extranormal Operations and a member of the Justice Foundation.

== Powers and abilities ==
Strange Visitor is connected to the Earth's geomagnetic field and has the power to manipulate electromagnetic energy, which enables her to fire blasts of electrical energy from her hands or eyes, generate magnetic fields to move, lift, and manipulate metal objects, create force fields, steal energy from others, and even "read" an object's magnetic field. She also has the power to fly at near light speeds, lower her density to become intangible, and telepathically sense emotions.

== In other media ==
Sharon Vance appears in the Young Justice episode "True Colors", voiced by Masasa Moyo. This version is a tour guide at a LexCorp farming facility.
