= Jack Kirby bibliography =

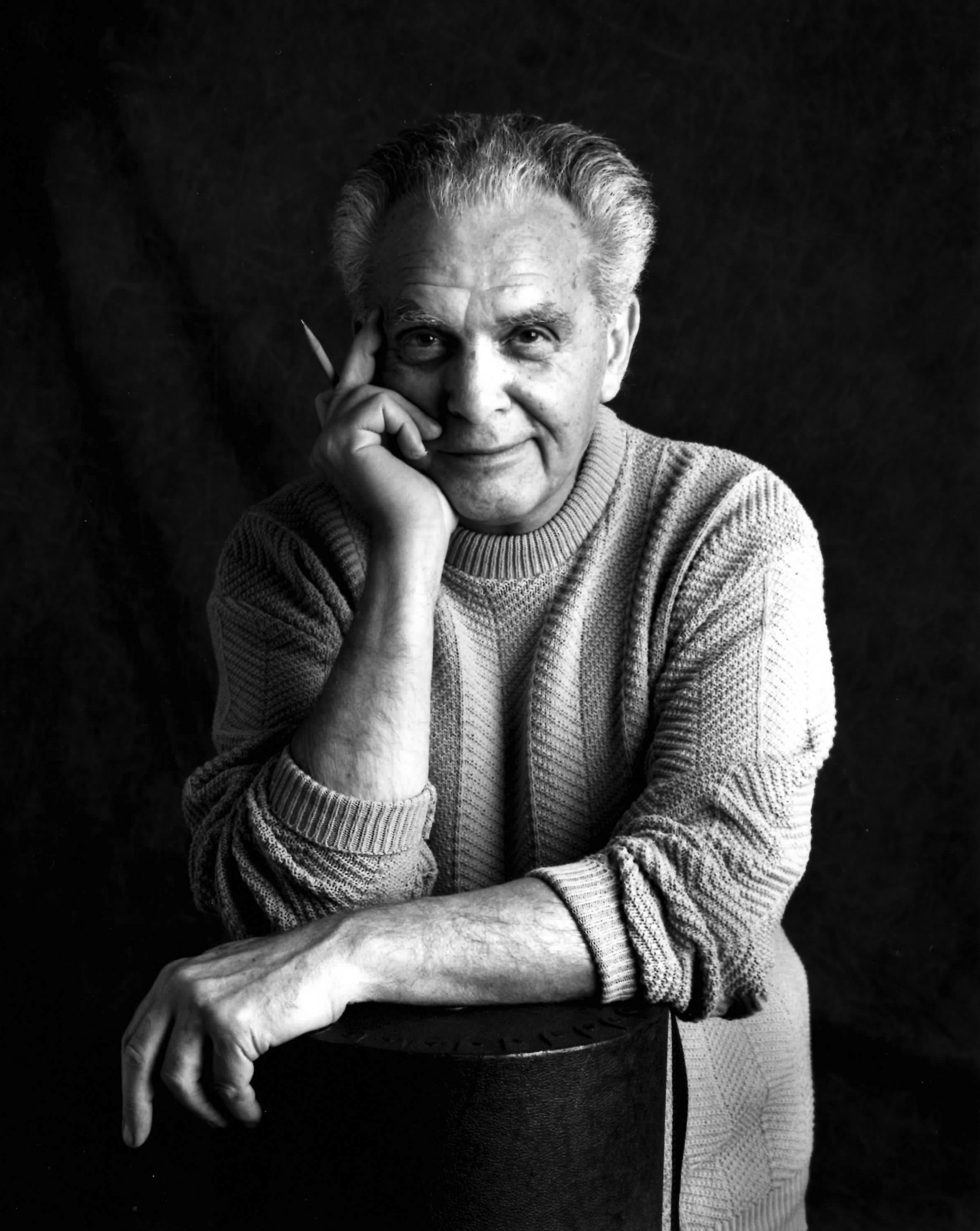
- Jack Kirby in 1992
- Active period: 1941–1993

Publishers
- Marvel Comics: 1941–1978
- DC Comics: 1942–1986
- Pacific Comics: 1981–1984

Jack Kirby was a prolific comics creator who created many American comic books and characters, particularly for Marvel Comics and DC Comics.

== Comics ==
Comics work (interior pencil art and story) includes:

=== DC Comics ===
- Adventure Comics (Sandman) #72–97, 100–102 (1942–46); (Manhunter): #73–80 (1942–43); (Green Arrow) #250–256 (1957)
- All Star Comics #14–17, 19 (Sandman) (1942–43)
- All-Star Western #99 (1958)
- The Amazing World of DC Comics #1 (1974) (material intended for In the Days of the Mob #2)
- The Best of DC #22 (story intended for unpublished Sandman #7) (1981)
- Boy Commandos #1–6, 15, 17, 19, 21, 23–24, 29–33 (1942–43; 1946–49)
- Cancelled Comic Cavalcade (Sandman) #2 (1978)
- Challengers of the Unknown #1–8 (1958–59)
- DC Comics Presents #84 (Superman and the Challengers of the Unknown) (1985)
- DC Graphic Novel #4 ("The Hunger Dogs") (1985)
- Demon #1–16 (1972–74)
- Detective Comics (Boy Commandos) #64–83, 85, 128, 134, 136–137, 150 (1942–44, 1947–48)
- 1st Issue Special #1 (Atlas), #5 (Manhunter), #6 (Dingbats of Danger Street) (1975)
- Forbidden Tales of Dark Mansion #6 (1972) (material intended for Spirit World #2)
- Forever People #1–11 (1971–72)
- Heroes Against Hunger #1 (two pages only) (1986)
- History of the DC Universe HC (one page only) (1988)
- House of Mystery #61, 63, 65–66, 70, 72, 76, 78–79, 84–85 (1957–59)
- House of Secrets #3–4, 8, 11–12 (1957–58)
- In the Days of the Mob #1 (1971)
- Justice, Inc. #2–4 (1975)
- Kamandi: The Last Boy on Earth #1–40 (1972–76)
- Kobra #1 (1976)
- Mister Miracle #1–18 (1971–74)
- My Greatest Adventure #15–18, 20–21, 28 (1957–59)
- New Gods #1–11 (1971–72)
- New Gods vol. 2 #6 (1984)
- O.M.A.C. #1–8 (1974–75)
- Our Fighting Forces (The Losers) #151–162 (1974–75)
- Real Fact Comics #1–2, 9 (1946–47)
- Richard Dragon, Kung Fu Fighter #3 (1975)
- Sandman #1, 4–6 (1974–76)
- Showcase (Challengers of the Unknown) #6-7, 11-12 (1957–1958)
- Spirit World #1 (1971)
- Star Spangled Comics (Newsboy Legion) #7–30, 53–56, 58–59 (1942–46)
- Superman #400 (one page only) (1984)
- Superman's Pal Jimmy Olsen #133–139, 141–148 (1970–72)
- Super Powers #1–4 (plotter), #5 (writer/penciller) (1984)
- Super Powers vol. 2 #1–6 (1985–86)
- Tales of the Unexpected #12–13, 15–18, 21–24 (1957–58)
- Weird Mystery Tales #1–3 (1972) (material intended for Spirit World #2)
- Who's Who: The Definitive Directory of the DC Universe #2–6, 8–18, 20, 22 (1985–86)
- World's Finest Comics (Sandman) #6–7 (1942); (Boy Commandos) #8–11, 13-14 (1942–43); (Green Arrow) #96–99 (1957)

=== Marvel Comics ===
- All Winners Comics #1–2 (Timely, 1941)
- Amazing Adventures #1–6 (1961)
- Amazing Adventures vol. 2 #1–4 (Inhumans) (1970–71)
- The Amazing Spider-Man #8 (1964)
- Astonishing #56 (Atlas, 1956)
- Astonishing Tales #1–2 (Ka-Zar) (1970)
- The Avengers #1–8 (full pencils), #14–16 (layouts only, pencils by Don Heck, Dick Ayers) (1963–65)
- Battle #64-70 (1959–1960)
- Battleground #14 (Atlas, 1956)
- Black Panther #1–12 (1977–78)
- Black Rider #1 (Atlas, 1957)
- Captain America Comics #1–10 (Timely, 1941–42)
- Captain America #100–109, 112 (1968–69); #193–214, Annual #3–4 (1976–77)
- Chamber of Darkness #4–5 (1970)
- Daring Mystery Comics #6 (Timely, 1940)
- Devil Dinosaur #1–9 (1978)
- Eternals #1–19, Annual #1 (1976–78)
- Fantastic Four #1–102, 108, 236, Annual #1–6 (1961–71, 1981)
- Gunsmoke Western #47, 51, 59, 62–67, 69–71, 73, 77 (1958–1963)
- The Incredible Hulk #1–5 (1962–63)
- Journey into Mystery #51–52, 54–82 (1959–62); (Thor): #83–89, 93, 97–125, Annual #1 (1962–66)
- Kid Colt Outlaw #86, 93, 95-96 (1959–1961); #119 (1964)
- Love Romances #85, #96-105 (1960–1963)
- Machine Man #1–9 (1978)
- Marvel Mystery Comics #13–25 (Golden Age Vision)(Timely, 1940–41)
- Marvel Treasury Special Featuring Captain America's Bicentennial Battles (1976)
- My Own Romance #74 (1960)
- Not Brand Echh #1, 3, 5–7 (1967–68)
- Quick Trigger Western #16 (Atlas, 1957)
- Rawhide Kid #17-32, 34, 43 (1960–1964)
- Red Raven Comics #1 (Timely, 1940)
- Sgt. Fury and his Howling Commandos #1–7, 13 (1963–64)
- Silver Surfer #18 (1970)
- Silver Surfer: The Ultimate Cosmic Experience (1978) (Marvel Fireside Books/Simon & Schuster)
- Strange Stories of the Unusual #7 (Atlas, 1956)
- Strange Tales #67–70, 72–100 (1959–62); (Human Torch): #101–105, 108–109, 114, 120, Annual #2 (1962–64); (Nick Fury): #135, 141–142 (full pencils), 136–140, 143–153 (layouts only, pencils by John Severin, Jim Steranko and others) (1965–67)
- Strange Worlds #1, 3 (1958–1959)
- Tales of Suspense #2–4, 6–35 (1959–62); (Iron Man): #40-41, 43 (1963); (Captain America): #59–68, 78–86, 92–99 (full pencils), #69–75, 77 (layouts only) (1964–1968)
- Tales to Astonish #1, 5–34; (Ant-Man): #35–40, 44, 49–51 (1962–64); (The Incredible Hulk): #68–72 (full pencils), #73–84 (layouts only, pencils by Bill Everett and others) (1965–66)
- Teen-Age Romance #84-86 (1961–1962)
- Thor #126–177, 179, Annual #2 (1966–70)
- Two-Gun Kid #54-55, 57-62 (1960–1963)
- Two Gun Western #12 (Atlas, 1957)
- 2001: A Space Odyssey #1–10 (1976–77)
- 2001: A Space Odyssey treasury special (1976)
- What If #11 (Fantastic Four) (1978)
- World of Fantasy #16, 18 (1959)
- X-Men #1–11 (full pencils), #12–17 (layouts only, pencils by Alex Toth and Werner Roth) (1963–65)
- Yellow Claw #2-4 (Atlas, 1956–1957)
- Young Allies Comics #1 (Timely, 1941)

=== Crestwood Publications/Prize ===
- All For Love vol. 3, #2 (1959)
- Black Magic #1-7, #10-11, #13, #15, #18-33 (1950–54)
- Fighting American #1-7 (1954–55); #1 (1966, Harvey Comics)
- Frankenstein Comics #7 (1947)
- Headline Comics #23–37 (1947–49)
- Justice Traps the Guilty #1-10, #18-19 (1947–49, 1950)
- Prize Comics #7-9, #63 (1940–41, 1947)
- Real West Romances #4-5 (1949–50)
- Strange World of Your Dreams #1-3 (1952)
- Treasure Comics #10 (1946)
- Western Love #1-2, 5 (1949–50)
- Young Brides #1-4, #6-12, #25-30 (1952–54, 1955–56)
- Young Love #1-4, #6-10, #13-23, #25, #30-31, #36-37, #39-51, #55, #69-73 (1949–54, 1956)
- Young Romance #1–47, #53-67, #80-88, #90-93, #95, #97-99, #102-103 (1947–54, 1955–59)

=== Other publishers ===
- Argosy vol. 3 #2 (1990) (Richard Kyle Publications)
- All-New Comics #13 (1946) (Harvey Comics)
- Airboy Comics vol. 4 #5–11 (1947) (Hillman Comics)
- Black Cat #6–8 (1947) (Harvey Comics)
- Boy Explorers #1–2 (1946) (Harvey Comics)
- Boys' Ranch #1–6 (1950–51) (Harvey Comics)
- Blue Bolt Comics #2–6, 8–10 (1940–41) (Novelty Press)
- Bullseye #1–5 (1954–1955) (Mainline Publications)
- Captain 3-D #1 (1953) (Harvey Comics)
- Captain Marvel Adventures #1 (1941) (Fawcett Comics)
- Captain Victory and the Galactic Rangers #1–13, Special #1 (1981–84) (Pacific Comics)
- Clue Comics #13, vol. 2 #1–3 (1947) (Hillman Comics)
- Champion Comics #10 (1940) (Harvey Comics)
- Crash Comics Adventures #1–3 (1940) (Holyoke Publishing)
- Destroyer Duck #1–5 (with Steve Gerber) (1982–83) (Eclipse Comics)
- Double Life of Private Strong #1–2 (1959) (Archie Comics)
- Famous Funnies #63, 84 (1939) (Eastern Color)
- Fly #1–2 (1959) (Archie Comics)
- Foxhole #2 (1954) (Mainline Publications)
- Green Hornet Fights Crime #37–39 (1947–58) (Harvey Comics)
- In Love #1–3 (1954) (Mainline Publications)
- Jumbo Comics #1–3 (1938) (Fiction House)
- The Last of the Viking Heroes Summer Special #1 (writer, with David Schwartz and Michael Thibodeaux) (1987) (Genesis West)
- My Date Comics #1-4 (1947–1948) (Hillman Comics)
- Mystery Men Comics #10 (1940) (Fox Comics)
- Phantom Force #1–2 (with Michael Thibodeaux) (1993–1994) (Image Comics)
- Phantom Force #0 (with Michael Thibodeaux) (1994) (Genesis West)
- Police Trap #2, 4 (1954–1955) (Mainline Publications)
- Police Trap #5–6 (1955) (Charlton Comics)
- Real Clue Crime Stories vol. 2 #4–6 (1947) (Hillman Comics)
- Satan's Six #1 (1993) (Topps Comics)
- Science Comics #4 (1940) (Fox Comics)
- Silver Star #1–6 (1983–84) (Pacific Comics)
- Stuntman #1–3 (1946) (Harvey Comics)
- Turtle Soup #4 (with Michael Thibodeaux) (1992) (Mirage Studios)
- Wow Comics #1 (1940–41) (Fawcett Comics)

=== Collected work ===
==== DC Comics ====
- The Boy Commandos by Joe Simon and Jack Kirby Vol. 1 collects stories from Detective Comics #64–73; World's Finest Comics #8–9; and Boy Commandos #1–2; 256 pages, November 2010, ISBN 978-1401229214
- The Boy Commandos by Joe Simon and Jack Kirby Vol. 2 collects stories from Detective Comics #74-85; World's Finest Comics #10-13; and Boy Commandos #3-5; 304 pages, December 2015, ISBN 978-1401258177
- Challengers of the Unknown Archives
  - Volume 1 collects Showcase #6–7, 11–12 and Challengers of the Unknown #1–2, 168 pages, August 2003, ISBN 978-1563899973
  - Volume 2 collects Challengers of the Unknown #3–8, 168 pages, November 2004, ISBN 978-1401201531
- Challengers of the Unknown by Jack Kirby collects Showcase #6–7, 11–12 and Challengers of the Unknown #1–8, 320 pages, June 2012, ISBN 978-1401234744
- Fourth World by Jack Kirby Omnibus (New Printing) collects Superman’s Pal Jimmy Olsen #133-139 and 141–148, New Gods #1-11, Forever People #1-11, DC Graphic Novel #4: The Hunger Dogs and a story from New Gods #6 (1984). 1536 pages, September 2021, ISBN 978-1779512611
- In the Days of the Mob collects In the Days of the Mob #1, 108 pages, August 2013, ISBN 978-1401240790
- Jack Kirby's The Demon, collects The Demon #1–16, 384 pages, November 2008, ISBN 978-1401219161
- Jack Kirby's The Forever People collects The Forever People #1–11, 288 pages, October 1999, ISBN 978-1563895104
- Jack Kirby's Mister Miracle: Super Escape Artist collects Mr Miracle #1–10, 256 pages, September 1998, ISBN 978-1563894572
- Jack Kirby's Fourth World: Featuring Mister Miracle collects Mr Miracle #11–18, 187 pages, July 2001, ISBN 978-1563897238
- Jack Kirby's Fourth World Omnibus
  - Volume 1 collects Forever People #1–3, Mister Miracle #1–3, The New Gods #1–3, Superman's Pal Jimmy Olsen #133–139, 396 pages, May 2007, ISBN 978-1401213442 (hardcover); December 2011, ISBN 978-1401232412 (paperback)
  - Volume 2 collects Forever People #4–6, Mister Miracle #4–6, The New Gods #4–6, Superman's Pal Jimmy Olsen #141–145, 396 pages, August 2007, ISBN 978-1401213572 (hardcover); April 2012, ISBN 978-1401234409 (paperback)
  - Volume 3 collects Forever People #7–10, Mister Miracle #7–9, The New Gods #7–10, Superman's Pal Jimmy Olsen #146–148, 396 pages, November 2007, ISBN 978-1401214852 (hardcover); August 2012, ISBN 978-1401235352 (paperback)
  - Volume 4 collects Forever People #11; Mister Miracle #10–18; The New Gods #11; "Even Gods Must Die" from The New Gods vol. 2, #6; DC Graphic Novel #4: "The Hunger Dogs"; "On the Road to Armagetto!" (previously unpublished), 424 pages, March 2008, ISBN 978-1401215835 (hardcover); December 2012, ISBN 978-1401237462 (paperback)
- Jack Kirby's New Gods, collects The New Gods #1–11; 304 pages, December 1997, ISBN 978-1563893858
- Jack Kirby's O.M.A.C.: One Man Army Corps, collects O.M.A.C. #1–8, 200 pages, June 2008, ISBN 978-1401217907 (hardcover); September 2013, ISBN 978-1401240424 (paperback)
- Jack Kirby Omnibus
  - Volume 1 collects Green Arrow stories from Adventure Comics #250–256 and World's Finest Comics #96–99 plus stories from All-Star Western #99; House of Mystery #61, 63, 65–66, 70, 72, 76, 78–79, 84–85; House of Secrets #3–4, 8, 11–12; My Greatest Adventure #15–18, 20–21, 28; Real Fact Comics #1–2, 9; and Tales of the Unexpected #12–13. 15–18, 21–24; 304 pages, August 2011, ISBN 978-1401231071
  - Volume 2 collects The Best of DC #22; Black Magic #1–9; DC Comics Presents #84; 1st Issue Special #1, 5–6; Kobra #1; Richard Dragon, Kung Fu Fighter #3; The Sandman #1, 4–6; Super Powers #1–5; and Super Powers vol. 2 #1–6; 624 pages, May 2013, ISBN 978-1401238339
- Jimmy Olsen: Adventures by Jack Kirby
  - Volume 1 collects Superman's Pal Jimmy Olsen #133–141, 183 pages, July 2003, ISBN 9781563899843
  - Volume 2 collects Superman's Pal Jimmy Olsen #142–150, 192 pages, October 2004, ISBN 9781401202590
- Kamandi Archives
  - Volume 1 collects Kamandi: The Last Boy on Earth #1–10; 224 pages, October 2005, ISBN 978-1401204143
  - Volume 2 collects Kamandi: The Last Boy on Earth #11–20; 228 pages, February 2007, ISBN 978-1401212087
- Kamandi by Jack Kirby
  - Volume 1 collects Kamandi: The Last Boy on Earth #1–20, 448 pages, September 2011, ISBN 9781401232337
  - Volume 2 collects Kamandi: The Last Boy on Earth #21–40, 424 pages, December 2012, ISBN 978-1401236724
- The Losers by Jack Kirby collects Our Fighting Forces #151–162, 240 pages, March 2009, ISBN 978-1401221652
- The Newsboy Legion by Joe Simon and Jack Kirby Volume 1 collects Star Spangled Comics #7–32, 360 pages, March 2010, ISBN 978-1401225933
- Sandman by Joe Simon and Jack Kirby collects World's Finest Comics #6–7; Adventure Comics #72–102; and Sandman #1; 304 pages, August 2009, ISBN 978-1401222994
- Showcase Presents Challengers of the Unknown Volume 1 collects Showcase #6–7, 11–12, and Challengers of the Unknown #1–17, 544 pages, September 2006, ISBN 978-1401210878
- Showcase Presents Green Arrow Volume 1 collects Green Arrow stories from Adventure Comics #250–256 and World's Finest Comics #96–99; 528 pages, January 2006, ISBN 978-1401207854
- Spirit World collects work done for Spirit World #1 and 2, 108 pages, May 2012, ISBN 978-1401234188

==== Marvel Comics ====
- Marvel Masterworks:
  - Avengers
    - Volume 1 collects The Avengers #1–8, 216 pages, September 1988, ISBN 978-0785108832
    - Volume 2 collects The Avengers #14–17, 224 pages, September 1989, ISBN 978-0785111788
  - Captain America
    - Volume 1 collects Tales of Suspense #59–68, 77–81, 272 pages, October 1990, ISBN 978-0785111764
    - Volume 2 collects Tales of Suspense #82–86, 92–99 and Captain America #100, 240 pages, June 2005, ISBN 978-0785117858
    - Volume 3 collects Captain America #101–109 and 112, 288 pages, July 2006, ISBN 978-0785120636
  - Fantastic Four
    - Volume 1 collects Fantastic Four #1–10, 256 pages, November 1987, ISBN 978-0785111818
    - Volume 2 collects Fantastic Four #11–20 and Fantastic Four Annual #1, 295 pages, October 1988, ISBN 978-0785109808
    - Volume 3 collects Fantastic Four #21–30, 234 pages, September 1990, ISBN 978-0785111825
    - Volume 4 collects Fantastic Four #31–40 and Fantastic Four Annual #2, 264 pages, November 1992, ISBN 978-0785111832
    - Volume 5 collects Fantastic Four #41–50 and Fantastic Four Annual #3, 240 pages, October 1993, ISBN 978-0785111849
    - Volume 6 collects Fantastic Four #51–60 and Fantastic Four Annual #4, 240 pages, October 2000, ISBN 978-0785112662
    - Volume 7 collects Fantastic Four #61–71 and Fantastic Four Annual #5, 304 pages, August 2004, ISBN 978-0785115847
    - Volume 8 collects Fantastic Four #72–81 and Fantastic Four Annual #6, 272 pages, March 2005, ISBN 978-0785116943
    - Volume 9 collects Fantastic Four #82–93, 272 pages, November 2005, ISBN 978-0785118466
    - Volume 10 collects Fantastic Four #94–102, 272 pages, May 2006, ISBN 978-0785120612
  - Golden Age Captain America
    - Volume 1 collects #1–4, 264 pages, March 2005, ISBN 0-7851-1619-2
    - Volume 2 collects #5–8, 280 pages, July 2008, ISBN 978-0785122296
    - Volume 3 collects #9–10, 280 pages, January 2009, ISBN 0-7851-2878-6
  - Human Torch
    - Volume 1 collects Strange Tales #101–105, 108–109, 114 and Strange Tales Annual #2, 272 pages, September 2006, ISBN 978-0785120704
    - Volume 2 collects Strange Tales #120, 256 pages, April 2009, ISBN 978-0785135050
  - The Incredible Hulk
    - Volume 1 collects The Incredible Hulk #1–5, 150 pages, September 1989, ISBN 978-0785111856
    - Volume 2 collects Tales to Astonish #68–79, 266 pages, December 2004, ISBN 978-0785116547
    - Volume 3 collects Tales to Astonish #80–84, 288 pages, January 2006, ISBN 978-0785120322
  - Iron Man Volume 1 collects Tales of Suspense #41 and 43, 197 pages, September 1992, ISBN 978-0785111863
  - Nick Fury, Agent of S.H.I.E.L.D. Volume 1 collects Strange Tales #135–153, 288 pages, September 2007, ISBN 978-0785126867
  - Sgt. Fury and his Howling Commandos Volume 1 collects Sgt. Fury and his Howling Commandos #1–7 and 13, 320 pages, February 2006, ISBN 978-0785120391
  - Tales of Suspense Volume 1 collects Tales of Suspense #2–4 and 7–10, 272 pages, October 2006, ISBN 978-0785123538
  - Tales to Astonish
    - Volume 1 collects Tales to Astonish #1 and 5–10, 272 pages, January 2006, ISBN 978-0785118893
    - Volume 2 collects Tales to Astonish #11–20, 272 pages, March 2008, ISBN 978-0785129134
    - Volume 3 collects Tales to Astonish #21–30, 272 pages, March 2010, ISBN 978-0785141969
    - Volume 4 collects Tales to Astonish #31–34, 304 pages, January 2012, ISBN 978-0785158813
  - Thor
    - Volume 1 collects Journey Into Mystery #83–89, 93, 97–100, 280 pages, October 1991, ISBN 978-0785112679
    - Volume 2 collects Journey Into Mystery #101–110, 224 pages, January 1994, ISBN 978-0785111917
    - Volume 3 collects Journey Into Mystery #111–120 and Journey Into Mystery Annual #1, 256 pages, November 2001, ISBN 978-0785112686
    - Volume 4 collects Journey Into Mystery #121–125 and Thor #126–130, 240 pages, November 2005, ISBN 978-0785118800
    - Volume 5 collects Thor #131–140 and Thor Annual #2, 256 pages, November 2006, ISBN 978-0785120766
    - Volume 6 collects Thor #141–151, 224 pages, July 2007, ISBN 978-0785126904
    - Volume 7 collects Thor #152–162, 224 pages, May 2008, ISBN 978-0785129240
    - Volume 8 collects Thor #163–172, 224 pages, February 2009, ISBN 978-0785134978
    - Volume 9 collects Thor #173–177 and 179, 240 pages, October 2010, ISBN 978-0785142201
  - X-Men
    - Volume 1 collects X-Men #1–10, 240 pages, November 1987, ISBN 978-0785108450
    - Volume 2 collects X-Men #11–17, 240 pages, November 1988, ISBN 978-0785109839
- Marvel Omnibus:
  - Captain America Volume 1 collects Tales of Suspense #59–99 and Captain America #100–109, 112, 856 pages, May 2011, ISBN 978-0785150787
  - Captain America by Jack Kirby collects Captain America #193–214, Captain America Annual #3–4; and Marvel Treasury Special Featuring Captain America's Bicentennial Battles, 568 pages, March 2011, ISBN 978-0785149606
  - The Eternals Omnibus collects The Eternals #1–19 and The Eternals Annual #1, 392 pages, July 2006, ISBN 978-0785122050
  - The Fantastic Four Omnibus
    - Volume 1 collects Fantastic Four #1–30 and Fantastic Four Annual #1, 848 pages, October 2013, ISBN 978-0785185666
    - Volume 2 collects Fantastic Four #31–60 and Fantastic Four Annual #2–4, 832 pages, December 2013, ISBN 978-0785185673
  - The Incredible Hulk Omnibus Volume 1 collects The Incredible Hulk #1–5 and Tales to Astonish #68–84, 752 pages, June 2008, ISBN 978-0785130567
  - The Mighty Thor Omnibus Volume 1 collects Journey Into Mystery #83–89, 93, 97–120 and Journey Into Mystery Annual #1, 768 pages, January 2011, ISBN 978-0785149736
  - The X-Men Omnibus Volume 1 collects X-Men #1–17, 768 pages, April 2009, ISBN 978-0785129585
- Essential Captain America
  - Volume 1 collects Captain America #100–102, 520 pages, March 2000, ISBN 978-0785107408
  - Volume 2 collects Captain America #103–109, 112 512 pages, January 2002, ISBN 978-0785108276
- Captain America: Madbomb collects Captain America #193–200, 152 pages, August 2004, ISBN 0-7851-1557-9
- Captain America: Bicentennial Battles collects Captain America #201–205 and Marvel Treasury Special Featuring Captain America's Bicentennial Battles, 176 pages, June 2005, ISBN 0-7851-1726-1
- Captain America: The Swine collects Captain America #206–214, Captain America Annual #3 and Captain America Annual #4, 240 pages, December 2006, ISBN 0-7851-2078-5
- Black Panther
  - Volume 1 collects Black Panther #1–7, 136 pages, February 2005, ISBN 978-0785116875
  - Volume 2 collects Black Panther #8–12, 112 pages, August 2006, ISBN 978-0785120698
- Eternals Volume 1 collects The Eternals #1–11, 208 pages, June 2008, ISBN 978-0785133131
- Marvel Visionaries: Jack Kirby:
  - Volume 1 collects "Mercury in the 20th Century" from Red Raven Comics #1, "The Vision" from Marvel Mystery Comics #13, "Meet Captain America" from Captain America Comics #1, "UFO the Lightning Man" from Yellow Claw #3, "I Defied Pildorr, the Plunderer from Outer Space!" from Strange Tales #94, "I am the Amazing Dr. Droom!" from Amazing Adventures #1, "Beware the Rawhide Kid!" from Rawhide Kid #17, "The Origin of the Hulk" from Hulk #3, "Spidey Tackles the Torch" from Amazing Spider-Man #8, "Captain America Joins the Avengers!" from Avengers #4, "The Fangs of the Fox" from Sgt. Fury #6, "The Coming of Galactus" from Fantastic Four #48–50; "This Man. This Monster" from Fantastic Four #51, "The People Breeders" from Thor #134–135, "To Become an Immortal" from Thor #136, "This is a Plot?" from Fantastic Four Annual #5, "The Inhumans!" from Amazing Adventures vol. 2 #1–2, "America Will Die!" from Captain America #200, "The Fourth Host" from Eternals #7 and "What If the Original Marvel Bullpen Was the Fantastic Four?" from What If? #11, 344 pages, November 2004, ISBN 0-7851-1574-9
  - Volume 2 collects Captain America Comics #1, Marvel Mystery Comics #23, Yellow Claw #4, Strange Tales #89, 114, Two-Gun Kid #60, Love Romances #103, X-Men #9; Tales of Suspense #59, Sgt. Fury #13, Fantastic Four #57–60, Not Brand Echh #1, Thor #154–157, Devil Dinosaur #1, 344 pages, April 2006, ISBN 0-7851-2094-7

==== Titan Books ====
- Best of Simon and Kirby 240 pages, May 2009, ISBN 978-1845769314
- The Simon and Kirby Library: Crime 320 pages, November 2011, ISBN 978-1848569607
- The Simon and Kirby Library: Horror 320 pages, March 2014, ISBN 978-1848569591
- The Simon and Kirby Library: Science Fiction 320 pages, June 2013, ISBN 978-1848569614
- The Simon and Kirby Superheroes 480 pages, September 2010, ISBN 978-1848563650

=== Posthumous ===
Work usually based on reworking unused notes and sketches:

- Jack Kirby's Galactic Bounty Hunters (pencils, Icon Comics, July 2006–November 2007, collected as, 256 pages, hardcover, October 2007, ISBN 0-7851-2628-7, softcover, July 2008, ISBN 0-7851-2629-5)
- Fantastic Four: The Lost Adventure (with Stan Lee, unused story planned for Fantastic Four #102 some of which was reused in Fantastic Four #108 which is also reprinted, Marvel Comics, April 2008)
