= D. Bruce Berry =

American comic book artist

- Born: Douglas Bruce Berry; January 24, 1924 Oakland, California
- Died: September 30, 1998 (aged 74) Long Beach, California
- Areas: Penciller, Inker, Letterer
- Notable works: Kamandi; OMAC
- Awards: 1964 Alley Award "Best Fan Comic Strip"

Douglas Bruce Berry (January 24, 1924 – September 30, 1998) was an American comic book artist who is best known as the inker of several of Jack Kirby's comic book series in the 1970s.

== Biography ==
D. Bruce Berry was born in Oakland, California and served in the United States Army Air Forces during World War II. He worked in the advertising industry for 29 years and drew for various fanzines including Bill Spicer's Fantasy Illustrated in 1963–1964. Berry sent several threatening letters to science-fiction editor Earl Kemp in 1958 and was sent to a mental institution following a trial. He was released in 1960. Berry and Spicer collaborated with Eando Binder on an Adam Link story which won the 1964 Alley Award in the category "Best Fan Comic Strip". In the late 1960s, he moved to Los Angeles. He began inking and lettering Jack Kirby's Kamandi series as of issue #16 (April 1974) and worked with Kirby for the next two years. In 2019, TwoMorrows Publishing released Jack Kirby's Dingbat Love, a collection of previously unpublished work which Kirby had drawn for DC Comics in the 1970s. This included a "Dingbats of Danger Street" story inked by Berry.

== Bibliography ==
=== Bill Spicer ===
- Fantasy Illustrated #1–2 (1963–1964)

=== DC Comics ===
- 1st Issue Special #1 (Atlas), #5 (Manhunter) (1975)
- DC Graphic Novel #4 ("The Hunger Dogs") (1985)
- Kamandi #16–37 (1974–1976)
- Kobra #1 (1976)
- New Gods vol. 2 #6 (1984)
- OMAC #2–7 (1974–1975)
- Our Fighting Forces #151–152, 154–155, 161–162 (The Losers) (1974–1975)
- Richard Dragon, Kung-Fu Fighter #3 (1975)

=== Marvel Comics ===
- Amazing Adventures #33 (Killraven) (1975)
- Captain America #191–192, 195–196 (1975–1976)

=== Pacific Comics ===
- Silver Star #3–6 (1983–1984)

=== Texas Trio ===
- Star-Studded Comics #6 (1965)

=== TwoMorrows Publishing ===
- Jack Kirby's Dingbat Love (Dingbats of Danger Street) (2019)

Preceded by Mike Royer	Kamandi inker 1974–1976	Succeeded by Mike Royer
Preceded by Mike Royer	OMAC inker 1974–1975	Succeeded by Mike Royer
Preceded by Vince Colletta	Captain America inker 1975–1976	Succeeded by Frank Giacoia
