= Mike Royer =

American comics artist and inker (born 1941)

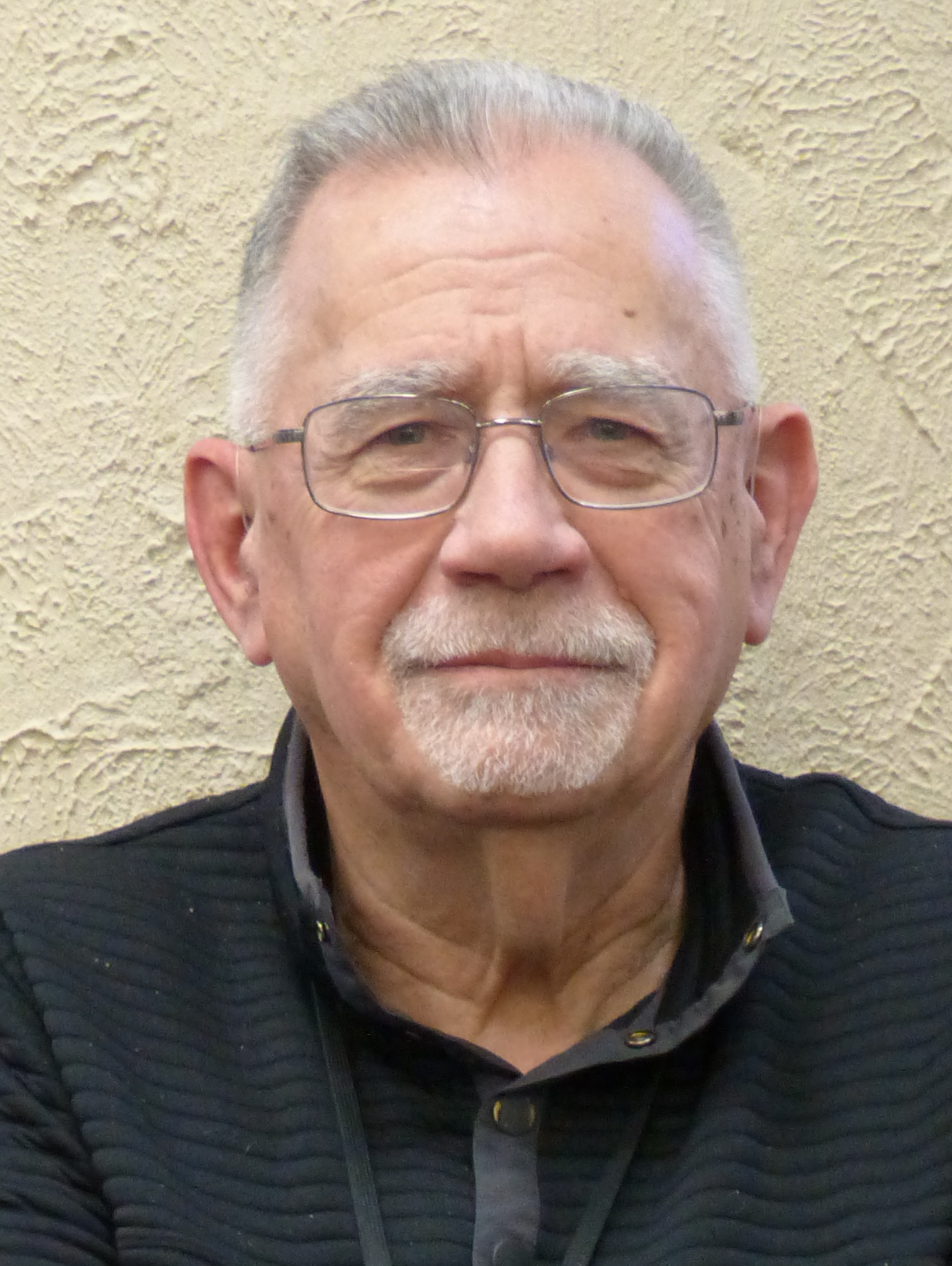
- Royer in 2020
- Born: Michael W. Royer; June 28, 1941 (age 85) Lebanon, Oregon, U.S.
- Areas: Penciller, Inker
- Pseudonym: Mike
- Awards: Inkpot Award 1978; Inkwell Awards Joe Sinnott Hall of Fame Award (2021)

Michael W. Royer (/ˈrɔɪ.ər/; born June 28, 1941) is an American comics artist and inker, best known for his work with pencilers Russ Manning and Jack Kirby. In later life Royer became a freelance product designer and character artist for The Walt Disney Company.

== Biography ==
=== Early life and career ===
Mike Royer was born on June 28, 1941, in Lebanon, Oregon. He moved to southern California in early 1965 to pursue a career in comic book art, although his first confirmed credit, inking penciler Tony Strobl on the two-page story "Pluto Helps Babysitting" in publisher Gold Key Comics' Walt Disney's Comics and Stories #282 (March 1964), appeared a year earlier. He became an assistant to artist Russ Manning on Gold Key's Magnus, Robot Fighter comic book, beginning with issue #12 (Jan. 1966), and Tarzan, beginning with issue #158 (June 1966). By the following year, he was also working with artists Warren Tufts and Alberto Giolitti on the company's Korak, Son of Tarzan comic. He fully drew two 10-page stories, featuring the Three Musketeers and a group called the Arabian Knights, in Gold Key's children's comic Hi-Adventure Heroes #2 (Aug. 1969). He also worked, uncredited, writing and drawing the Gold Key comics Speed Buggy and Butch Cassidy and the Sundance Kids, and drew covers for the publisher's licensed Hanna-Barbera property TV Adventure Heroes.

While continuing to work primarily for Gold Key, Royer began freelancing for Warren Publishing's line of black-and-white horror comics magazines, drawing writer James Haggenmiller's eight-page "Space Age Vampire" in Eerie #23 (Sept. 1969), and later drawing a handful of stories in Creepy and Vampirella as well.

=== 1970s and Jack Kirby ===
Beginning in 1970, Royer illustrated the album covers for the multi-part, year-by-year Cruisin' series of early rock and roll hits on Increase Records. The covers, when read as panels, created a faux romance comics story.

Royer inked the covers of writer-penciler Jack Kirby's The Forever People #2 and #5 (May and Nov. 1971), and The New Gods #5 (Nov. 1971) in Kirby's "Fourth World" epic at DC Comics, which he began after leaving Marvel Comics. He became Kirby's primary inker at DC, working on those titles and another title connected to the Fourth World series Mister Miracle, as well as on the preexisting series, Superman's Pal Jimmy Olsen which was incorporated into the same narrative. He additionally inked Kirby's next two DC series, The Demon and Kamandi, The Last Boy on Earth, and, among other Kirby projects, inked the extant war comics feature "The Losers" in several issues of Our Fighting Forces in 1975.

Royer also lettered and inked the last six months of Russ Manning's Tarzan Sunday-newspaper comic strip and, in the late 1970s, the first four months of Manning's daily and Sunday Star Wars comic strips.

=== Later career ===
Beginning in 1979, Royer spent 14 years on staff with The Walt Disney Company, doing art and design for books, comic books and comic strips, and theme park and licensed merchandise for its Consumer Product/Licensing division. His comics work there included designing and art directing the movie tie-in Dick Tracy and 3-D Rocketeer comic books, and helping launch a Winnie the Pooh licensing program in late 1993; for the latter, he was featured in a 43-minute video, How To Draw Pooh, sent to licensees. Royer left his staff position in June 1993 to freelance full-time for Disney, primarily on Winnie the Pooh projects.

Since 2000, Royer has produced freelance art and design, including work on Digimon products, screen icons for the Fox Family cable television channel environment and its Fox Kids programming bloc, "floor plans" for computer game animators, Reader Rabbit workbooks, and Rescue Heroes toy packaging. Since 2001, Royer and his wife and concept collaborator, Laurie, have lived in Medford, Oregon. In 2019, TwoMorrows Publishing released Jack Kirby's Dingbat Love, a collection of previously-unpublished work which Kirby had drawn for DC Comics in the 1970s. This included a "Dingbats of Danger Street" story inked by Royer.

== Awards ==
Royer received an Inkpot Award in 1978. In 2018, Royer was the Inkwell Awards Guest of Honor at the annual live ceremony. He was awarded the Inkwell Awards Joe Sinnott Hall of Fame Award in May 2021 for his inking career.

== Bibliography ==
=== Comico ===
- Jonny Quest #1 (1986)

=== DC Comics ===
- 1st Issue Special #6–7, 12 (1975–1976)
- Adventure Comics #442 (1975)
- The Amazing World of DC Comics #1 (1974)
- The Best of DC #22 (1982)
- Cancelled Comic Cavalcade #2 (1978)
- DC Graphic Novel #4 ("The Hunger Dogs") (1985)
- Demon #1–16 (1972–1974)
- Detective Comics #452–453 (1975)
- Forbidden Tales of Dark Mansion #6 (1972)
- Forever People #6–11 (1971–1972)
- Freedom Fighters #1 (1976)
- House of Mystery #236 (1975)
- House of Secrets #139 (1976)
- Justice, Inc. #2–4 (1975)
- Kamandi, the Last Boy on Earth #1–16, 38–44 (1972–1976)
- Mister Miracle #5–18 (1971–1974)
- Mister Miracle Special #1 (1987)
- New Gods #5–11 (1971–1972)
- Omac #1–2, 8 (1974–1975)
- Our Fighting Forces #153, 156–160 (The Losers) (1975)
- Plastic Man #14 (1976)
- Sandman #1–3, 5 (1974–1975)
- Superman's Pal Jimmy Olsen #146–148 (1972)
- Weird Mystery Tales #1–3 (1972)
- Who's Who: The Definitive Directory of the DC Universe #16 (Mother Box profile) (1986)
- Who's Who: Update '87 #2 (Esak and Fastbak profiles) (1987)

=== Eclipse Comics ===
- The DNAgents #4, 15, 18 (1983–1985)
- Surge #4 (1985)

=== Gold Key Comics ===
- Donald Duck #104–106, 116, 135, 215–216 (1965–1980)
- Edgar Rice Burroughs Korak, Son of Tarzan #20–22, 34 (1967–1970)
- Fantastic Voyage #1–2 (1969)
- Golden Comics Digest #4, 9 (1969–1970)
- Hanna-Barbera Hi-Adventure Heroes #2 (1969)
- Hanna-Barbera Super TV Heroes #2–6 (1968–1969)
- Magnus, Robot Fighter #12–14, 24–28, 31, 45–46 (1965–1977)
- Mickey Mouse #102 (1965)
- Mystery Comics Digest #18–19 (1974)
- Space Family Robinson, Lost in Space on Space Station One #58 (1982)
- Tarzan #153–156, 158, 160–161, 163, 175–178, 188–203, 205 (1965–1971)
- Uncle Scrooge #55, 88 (1965–1970)
- Walt Disney Chip 'n' Dale #32–35 (1975)
- Walt Disney Comics Digest #11 (1969)
- Walt Disney Presents Blackbeard's Ghost (1968)
- Walt Disney Presents King Louie and Mowgli #1 (1968)
- Walt Disney Scamp #22–25, 29 (1975–1976)
- Walt Disney's Comics and Stories #v24#9, #v25#12, #v26#2, #v26#3, #v26#8, #v35#7 (1964–1975)

=== Marvel Comics ===
- 2001: A Space Odyssey #1–10 (1976–1977)
- Avengers: The Ultron Imperative #1 (2001)
- Black Panther #1–12 (1977–1978)
- Captain America #210–212, 214 (1977)
- Captain America: What Price Glory #1–4 (2003)
- Defenders #49–50 (1977)
- Devil Dinosaur #1–9 (1978)
- Eternals #5–19, Annual #1 (1976–1978)
- Fantastic Four vol. 3 #50 (2002)
- Fantastic Four: World's Greatest Comics Magazine #10 (2001)
- Ka-Zar vol. 2 #1, 3–4 (1974)
- Machine Man #1–9 (1978)
- Thor: Godstorm #1–3 (2001–2002)
- Werewolf by Night #18 (1974)
- What If...? #11 (1978)

=== Pacific Comics ===
- Captain Victory and the Galactic Rangers #1–2, 6 (1981–1982)
- Silver Star #1–3 (1983)

=== Topps Comics ===
- Satan's Six #1 (1993)

=== TwoMorrows Publishing ===
- Jack Kirby's Dingbat Love (Dingbats of Danger Street) (2019)

=== Warren Publications ===
- Creepy #29–30, 32, 37–38 (1969–1971)
- Eerie #23–25, 27, 32, 34 (1969–1971)
- Vampirella #1–2, 4–6 (1969–1970)

| Preceded by Vince Colletta | New Gods inker 1971–1972 | Succeeded by Dan Adkins (in 1977) |
| Preceded by Vince Colletta | Mister Miracle inker 1971–1974 | Succeeded by Ilya Hunch (in 1977) |
| Preceded by n/a | Kamandi, the Last Boy on Earth inker 1972–1974 | Succeeded by D. Bruce Berry |
| Preceded by D. Bruce Berry | Kamandi, the Last Boy on Earth inker 1976 | Succeeded by Bob Smith |
