= Green Team (comics) =

DC Comics series

The Green Team
- The Green Team from 1st Issue Special #2 (May 1975), cover art by Jerry Grandenetti.

Publication information
- Publisher: DC Comics
- First appearance: 1st Issue Special #2 (May 1975)
- Created by: Joe Simon; Jerry Grandenetti

In-story information
- Member(s): Commodore Murphy; J.P. Huston; Cecil Sunbeam; Abdul Smith

The Green Team is a fictional comic book team of rich-kid adventurers published by DC Comics. The team debuted in 1st Issue Special #2 (May 1975), and was created by Joe Simon and Jerry Grandenetti. In its initial appearance, the group was subtitled "Boy Millionaires". In 2010s comics, a revamped version of the group appeared in a series subtitled "Teen Trillionaires", thus adjusting for both inflation and the declining popularity of boy adventurers.

== Publication history ==
The Green Team's first adventure appears in 1st Issue Special #2 (cover-dated May 1975), an anthology comic. For many years, this would be their only conventionally published appearance. Not long after their debut, a regular Green Team series went into production, but the DC Implosion prevented it from reaching store shelves. Two issues had been completed at the time the series was cancelled, and these saw publication of a sort in the first volume of Cancelled Comic Cavalcade (Fall 1978), a two-volume collection DC Comics printed on photocopiers to secure copyrights on the stack of unpublished material left over after the DC Implosion. In the first of the two unpublished adventures, the boys are pitted against giant lobsters and the Russian Navy. In the second, the Green Team faces a villain called the Paperhanger who has special wallpaper that grows plants and trees, and who is a dead ringer for Adolf Hitler.

In subsequent decades, the Green Team appeared on one page of Ambush Bug #3 (August 1985), in one panel of Animal Man #25 (July 1990), and a single page of Adventures of Superman #549 (Aug. 1997), in which the boys meet the Newsboy Legion and Dingbats of Danger Street, financing a youth center for the two street gangs. Writer Karl Kesel explained that he was a fan of the Newsboy Legion, and brought in the other two boy groups as a counterpoint to the Newsboys, since all three were created by Joe Simon and/or Jack Kirby. Cecil Sunbeam and Abdul Smith, two members of the Green Team, appear in Ambush Bug: Year None #1 (Sept. 2008).

As part of The New 52 reboot of DC's continuity, the Green Team and its sister book The Movement were re-established in 2013. Written by Art Baltazar and Franco Aureliani, and drawn by Ig Guara, the first issue debuted in May 2013 and focused on teens who use their financial resources to purchase power in the DC Universe, including super powers. This run lasted 8 issues and concluded in January 2014.

== Fictional character biographies ==
The only prerequisite for joining the original Green Team is possession of at least one million dollars, primarily in cash. The team pays fortunes to anyone who can offer them a worthy adventure. In their first story, they fund the "Great American Pleasure Machine", a sort of roller coaster ride that brings so much pleasure to the villian of the piece that it drives them insane.

As a text page in 1st Issue Special #2 (May 1975) explains, their jumpsuit uniforms have many pockets for money, with special locks, and they carry ticker-tape wristwatches, a chain of keys that unlock any of their many labs and money vaults in far-flung lands, and a quarter-million dollars each.

=== The New 52 ===
In The Green Team: Teen Trillionaires, the group is reintroduced as a development company headed by Commodore Murphy with the stated purpose of funding cutting-edge technology. Commodore's true interest is in superheroics, however. He buys a set of four nanorobotic armor suits for the team, which grant them various powers and weapons, although none of the group know how to operate them. The team is quickly embroiled in a conflict with Riot, the suits' intended buyer; he is revealed to be Commodore's father, who harvested his son's genetic material to give himself superpowers. Commodore neutralizes Riot by using his suit to fill Riot's body with metal.

The group then goes to space to investigate a large asteroid. They are attacked by Icicle on orders from billionaire Bellachek Temple, who intends to strip the asteroid of its minerals and intentionally cause it to crash into the Earth. Icicle destroys the Green Team's ship and the asteroid and nearly kills them all, but Commodore manages to protect them with his suit, guiding them safely to Earth to land in front of Bellachek's headquarters. In the process, however, Commodore discovers that Cecilia has been secretly conducting an affair with J.P. Commodore confronts Bellachek, who admits that he sabotaged both the Team's suits and Riot's attempt to gain superpowers, all in the pursuit of gaining more money. Cecilia is seemingly disintegrated by Bellachek's men while protecting Commodore, causing J.P. to go berserk and transform into a yeti-like creature. Bellachek then manipulates J.P. into attacking the rest of the Green Team; during the fight, Mohammad manifests energy-based powers to protect Lucia and Cecilia reconstitutes her body.

The Team raid Bellachek's headquarters, only for Riot to intervene once more, now strengthened by Commodore's addition of metal to his self-replicating body. It is revealed that Bellachek promised Riot superpowers in exchange for delivering Commodore and the Green Team as guinea pigs. Commodore destroys the building, burying Riot while Bellachek escapes. Mohammad teleports the group away from the wreckage, and in the series' final page, they meet with the Teen Titans as Commodore proposes buying their team.

=== DC Rebirth ===
Following the DC Rebirth relaunch and the events of Death Metal, the 2023 series Danger Street retconned the Green Team to a form based on their original membership in 1st Issue Special. They are introduced in the series as materialistic young villains: Commodore employs Codename: Assassin as the Team's hired killer and bodyguard, and J.P. is shown to engage in illegal logging before he is murdered by a human Manhunter cultist. Commodore compels Jack Ryder to spread propaganda against The Outsiders, who Commodore claims are terrorists; following the murders of J.P. and Cecil, he betrays Abdul. It is eventually revealed that the Lord of Chaos gave the Helmet of Fate to the Green Team as children for winning a playground game, magically granting the Team wealth and power and transforming the game's losers into the Outsiders.

=== All In ===
In the 2026 New Titans series, a new version of Commodore Murphy is introduced as an antagonist. This incarnation of the character is the CEO of GreenCorp who uses the hashtag #GreenTeam to accumulate support for his activities on social media, claiming to build green energy infrastructure in the Amazon rainforest while searching for the secret city of Akahim.

== Membership ==
=== Original ===
- Commodore Murphy: A boy shipping magnate.
- J.P. Huston: A Texan oil tycoon.
- Cecil Sunbeam: A film director known as the "Starmaker".
- Abdul Smith: An African-American shoeshine boy who received half a million dollars due to a bug in his bank's computer. He shrewdly multiplied that stake, returned it to the bank, and had a million dollars left.

=== The New 52 ===
- Commodore Murphy: The leader of the group, who is into electronics. He is also interested in superhero-related materials. He is affectionately referred to as "64" within the group, an inside joke related to his trust fund; he will inherit 64 trillion dollars from his family when he turns twenty-one.
- J.P. Houston: A Texan who comes from "old money". He is Latino and has a sister named Lucia "L.L." Lynn who often spends time with the group. He is Commodore's best friend, but has misgivings about Commodore's interest in "this superhero thing" and how it will affect the group.
- Cecilia Sunbeam: The self-proclaimed "greatest actor of our generation." People whisper about her: "She's a celebrity, and she has all the problems that go with that". She is introduced as Commodore's girlfriend while secretly dating J.P.
- Mohammad Qahtanii: A prince and the youngest member of the Team.
