= DC Explosion and DC Implosion =

1978 DC Comics cancellation purge

The "DC Explosion" and "DC Implosion" were two events in 1978 – the first an official marketing campaign, the second a sardonic reference to it – in which American comics company DC Comics expanded their roster of publications, then abruptly cut it back. The DC Explosion was part of an ongoing initiative at DC to regain market share by increasing the number of titles they published, while also increasing page counts and cover prices. The so-called "DC Implosion" was the result of the publisher experiencing losses that year due to a confluence of factors, and cancelling a large number of ongoing and planned series in response. The cancellations included long-running series such as Our Fighting Forces, Showcase, and House of Secrets; new series introduced as part of the expansion, or "Explosion", such as Firestorm and Steel: The Indestructible Man; and announced series such as The Vixen which would have been the company's first title starring an African American woman. Former flagship series Detective Comics was also considered for cancellation. Some of the material already produced for these cancelled series was used in other publications. Several of the completed stories were "published" in small quantities as two issues of Cancelled Comics Cavalcade, whose title was a reference to DC's Golden-Age Comic Cavalcade series.

== History ==
The DC Explosion was a 1978 marketing campaign in which DC touted its increasing number of titles in the previous few years and increased story pages in all of its titles, accompanied by higher cover prices. The Explosion campaign itself lasted three months from its debut in comics cover-dated June 1978 until the revamp in comics cover-dated September 1978. The actual implosion at the company then followed with cancellations and a reduction in the number of titles.

Since the early 1970s, DC had seen its dominance of the market overtaken by Marvel Comics, partly because Marvel had significantly increased the number of titles that it published (both original material and reprint books). In large part, the DC Explosion was a plan to overtake Marvel by using its own strategy. DC's expansion actually began in earnest in 1975, when the company debuted 12 titles in the spring and summer, followed by four more titles by the end of the year. DC added 14 titles in 1976 and four more in 1977.

However, DC experienced ongoing poor sales from the winter of 1977 to the winter of 1978. This has been attributed in part to the North American blizzards in 1977 and 1978, which both disrupted distribution and curtailed consumer purchases. Furthermore, the effects of ongoing economic inflation, recession, and increased paper and printing costs, led to declines in both the profitability of the entire comic book industry and the number of readers. In response, company executives ordered that titles with marginal sales and several new series that were still in development be cancelled. During these meetings, it was decided that DC's long-running flagship title Detective Comics was to be terminated with #480 — until the decision was overturned following strenuous arguments on behalf of saving the title within the DC office, and Detective was instead merged with the better-selling Batman Family.

On June 22, 1978, DC Comics announced staff layoffs and the cancellation of approximately 40% of its line. Editors Al Milgrom and Larry Hama were two of the employees laid off.

== Cancelled titles ==
As a result of the Implosion, 17 series were cancelled abruptly. Fourteen other titles were cancelled in 1978, for the most part "planned" cancellations announced in DC promos and in the final issues of the comics themselves. The following titles were cancelled due to the Implosion, with the following as their final issue:

- All Star Comics #74 (Sept. cover date) — issue #75 later published in Adventure Comics #461 (Jan.–Feb. 1979) and 462 (March 1979); the feature continued there until #466
- Army at War #1 (Nov.) — war title
- Batman Family #20 (Nov.) — merged into Detective Comics as of issue #481 (Dec. 1978–Jan. 1979)
- Battle Classics #1 (Sept.) — reprint title
- Black Lightning #11 (Sept.) — issue #12 later published in World's Finest Comics #260 (Dec. 1979–Jan. 1980)
- Claw the Unconquered #12 (Aug.–Sept.)
- Doorway to Nightmare #5 (Sept.) — merged into The Unexpected
- Dynamic Classics #1 (Sept.) — reprint title
- Firestorm #5 (Oct.) — A new version of the story announced for issue #6 appeared in The Flash #294–296 (February–April 1981); the original version was published in the trade paperback Firestorm: The Nuclear Man (2011)
- House of Secrets #154 (Oct.–Nov.) — merged into The Unexpected
- Kamandi: The Last Boy on Earth #59 (Sept.–Oct.) — the "OMAC" back-up stories by Jim Starlin appeared in The Warlord #37–39 (Sept.–Nov. 1980)
- Our Fighting Forces #181 (Sept.–Oct.)
- Secrets of Haunted House #14 (Oct.–Nov.) — revived a year later with issue #15 (August 1979); the title continued until issue #46 (March 1982)
- Showcase #104 (Sept.) — the Deadman story for #105 appeared in Adventure Comics #464 and the Creeper story for #106 appeared in The Creeper by Steve Ditko (2010)
- Star Hunters #7 (Oct.–Nov.) - a planned Adam Strange back-up story later appeared in World's Finest #262
- Steel: The Indestructible Man #5 (Oct.–Nov.) — #6 story reworked for All-Star Squadron #8–9 (April–May 1982)
- The Witching Hour #85 (Oct.) — merged into The Unexpected

== 1978 cancellations unrelated to the DC Implosion ==
- Aquaman #63 (Aug.–Sept. cover date) — cancellation announced in March 1978. The Aquaman story from #64 was published in Adventure Comics #460 (November 1978)
- Challengers of the Unknown #87 (June–July)
- DC Super Stars #18 (Jan.–Feb.)
- Freedom Fighters #15 (July–Aug.) — cancelled a few months before the Implosion to make room for other titles in the DC Explosion; storyline was to have been concluded in Secret Society of Super Villains #16–18, which was itself cancelled (see below)
- Karate Kid #15 (July–Aug.) — cancelled a few months before the Implosion to make room for other titles in the DC Explosion; final story published
- Metal Men #56 (February–March) — storyline concluded with the Metal Men being recognized by the United Nations as citizens of the world and not property
- Mister Miracle #25 (Sept.) — cancellation announced March 1978.
- Return of the New Gods #19 (July–Aug.) — feature concluded in Adventure Comics #459-460
- Secret Society of Super Villains #15 (June–July) — cancellation announced March 1978. The characters next appeared in Justice League of America #166–168 (May–July 1979), which picked up where issue #15 left off. The stories from Secret Society of Super Villains #16 and 17 were finally published in Secret Society of Super Villains Vol. 2 (2012)
- Shade, the Changing Man #8 (Aug.–Sept.) — cancellation announced March 1978. The "Odd Man" story by Steve Ditko appeared in Detective Comics #487. Both the Shade and Odd Man stories were published in The Steve Ditko Omnibus Vol. 1 (2011)
- Shazam! #35 (May–June) — merged into World's Finest Comics with issue #253
- Super-Team Family #15 (Mar.–Apr.) – #16 (a Supergirl and the Doom Patrol team-up story published in The Superman Family #191–193)
- Teen Titans #53 (Feb.)
- Welcome Back, Kotter #10 (Mar.–Apr.) – final story published in Limited Collectors' Edition #C-57

== Cancelled Comic Cavalcade ==
About 30 titles were affected. Much of the unpublished work saw print in Cancelled Comic Cavalcade, a summer 1978 two-issue ashcan "series" which "published" the work in limited quantity solely to establish the company's copyright. The title was a play on DC's 1940s series Comic Cavalcade. Some of the material already produced for the canceled publications was later used in other series. The two volumes, composed of some of these stories along with earlier inventoried stories, were printed by DC staff members in black-and-white on the office photocopier. A total of 35 copies of each volume were produced, and distributed to the creators of the material, the U.S. copyright office and the Overstreet Comic Book Price Guide as proof of their existence. Considered a valued collectible, a set of both issues was valued as high as $3,680 in the 2011–2012 edition of the Comic Book Price Guide.

The contents ranged from completed stories to incomplete artwork. The covers featured new illustrations; the first one (by Al Milgrom) showed the canceled books' heroes lying either unconscious or dead on the ground, the second (by Alex Saviuk) showed the canceled heroes being kicked out of an office by a bespectacled man in a suit. The first issue carried a cover price of 10 cents, while the second carried a cover price of $1.00, but the publications were never actually offered for sale.

Cancelled Comic Cavalcade contained the following material:

=== Issue #1 ===
- Black Lightning #12 (later printed in World's Finest Comics #260), cover to issue #13
- Claw the Unconquered #13–14
- The Deserter #1
- Doorway to Nightmare #6 (later printed in The Unexpected)
- Firestorm #6 (later adapted as back-up stories in The Flash #294–296 (February-April 1981), original version published in the Firestorm: The Nuclear Man trade paperback in 2011)
- Green Team: Boy Millionaires #1–2 (were to have followed a try-out in 1st Issue Special #2)

=== Issue #2 ===
- Kamandi #60–61 ("OMAC" back-ups would appear in The Warlord #37–39 (September–November 1980), while the Kamandi stories were published in Kamandi Challenge Special in 2017)
- Prez #5 (later published in the 2016 trade paperback Prez: The First Teen President)
- Shade, the Changing Man #9 ("The Odd Man" story would appear in Detective Comics #487 (December 1979–January 1980))
- Showcase #105 featuring Deadman (later printed in a slightly edited form in Adventure Comics #464) and #106 featuring the Creeper
- Secret Society of Super Villains #16–17 (later published in Secret Society of Super Villains Vol. 2)
- Steel #6 (later reprinted with edits in All-Star Squadron #8–9 (April–May 1982))
- The Vixen #1
- covers for Army at War #2, Battle Classics #3, Demand Classics #1–2, Dynamic Classics #2, Mister Miracle #26, Ragman #6, Weird Mystery Tales #25–26, Western Classics #1–2

== Unpublished titles ==
Among the new series planned, but never published:

- Bucky O'Hare, a Larry Hama creation which was eventually published by Continuity Comics in 1984
- Demand Classics (reprint series) with "Flash of Two Worlds" planned for #1
- The Deserter (a Western created by Gerry Conway with pencils by Dick Ayers and inks by Romeo Tanghal)
- Ms. Mystic, a Neal Adams/Michael Netzer character later published by Pacific Comics and Continuity Comics
- Sorcerer, a David Michelinie/Bob Layton character later used as the basis for the Deathmask series published by Future Comics in 2003
- Starslayer, a Mike Grell creation later published by Pacific Comics and First Comics
- The Vixen would have been the first comic book series starring an African American superheroine; the character later made her first appearance in Action Comics #521 (July 1981). A back-up feature with the Harlequin II (Duela Dent) would have begun with issue #2.
- Western Classics (reprint series)

Secondary features were planned, but the titles in which three were to appear were cancelled before the stories were published; the reasons why the two that were planned for Adventure Comics were left unreleased are unknown:

- "Manhunter from Mars" in Aquaman
  - Pages from the first story exist. The story was written by Cary Burkett with pencils by John Fuller and inks by Bob Layton
- "Vigilante" in Aquaman
- "Captain Comet" in Secret Society of Super Villains
- "Metal Men" in Adventure Comics
- "The Man from Neverwhere", a creation of writer Roger McKenzie for Adventure Comics, "some sort of elvish/magical/time-travel superhero mishmosh of a concept"
- "Adam Strange" in Star Hunters. Story published in World's Finest Comics #263 (June/July 1980)

== See also ==
- List of comics solicited but never published
