= Codename: Assassin =

- Codename: Assassin from Superman's Pal Jimmy Olsen #1, art by Jesus Merino.

Publication information
- Publisher: DC Comics
- First appearance: 1st Issue Special #11 (February 1976)
- Created by: Gerry Conway; Steve Skeates; Nestor Redondo

In-story information
- Alter ego: Jonathan Drew
- Species: Metahuman
- Team affiliations: United States Army; Project Cadmus
- Notable aliases: The Assassin
- Abilities: Trained covert operative, telepathy, telekinesis

Codename: Assassin is a fictional antihero, a comic book character published by DC Comics. He debuted in 1st Issue Special #11 (February 1976), and was created by Gerry Conway, Steve Skeates and Nestor Redondo (credited as the Redondo Studio). In this first appearance he is called The Assassin, but later appearances renamed him "Codename: Assassin" after the feature in which he debuted.

Conway had been tasked with producing a story for the 11th issue of 1st Issue Special, and since he was working with Redondo, an artist who did not draw superheroes, he decided to make something similar to his earlier non-superhero vigilante the Punisher. In the resulting story, while participating in extrasensory perception studies conducted by a Doctor Andrew Stone at the fictional Antioke University, Jonathan Drew develops powers of telepathy and telekinesis which he uses to punish the murderers of his sister Marie. Drew's telekinesis allows him to walk on air, generate force fields, and lift heavy objects. The idea of The Assassin running through the air rather than using traditional flight was inspired by Wayne Boring's 1950s Superman comic books.

1st Issue Special #11, artist Mike Grell.

The Assassin briefly operates in Opal City during the 1970s. The character was given a 21st century revival in Superman's Pal Jimmy Olsen Special #1 (December 2008), which updates his origin and presents the character in a new light. In this new take, Drew is an operative of the American Government. Jonathan Drew is seemingly part of a conspiracy directed against Superman, and for as yet unknown reasons was responsible for Atlas' attack on Metropolis. Drew is also behind the murders of Dr. Stone, the original Newsboy Legion and the alien known as Dubbilex. He also attempts to murder Daily Planet photojournalist Jimmy Olsen, who had accidentally uncovered the conspiracy.

Drew acts as an agent of General Sam Lane in the multi-title crossover Superman: New Krypton.

- Adventure Comics Special Featuring the Guardian one-shots
- Superman's Pal Jimmy Olsen #2
- Superman #695
- Superman: War of the Supermen #1–4
