= Kevin Dooley =

Editor at DC Comics

- Born: Kevin Dooley; January 7, 1953 (age 73)
- Areas: Writer, Editor

Kevin Dooley (born January 7, 1953) is a former editor at DC Comics.

== Biography ==
During his time at DC, he served as the assistant editor to Andy Helfer, and then took over many of the titles following Helfer's promotion. Dooley edited the various Green Lantern books and Aquaman. He also dabbled with writing comics, including Mister Miracle (third series-1996), a stint on Green Arrow, Justice League Quarterly, Justice League America #50, as well as an issue of Superboy (The Adventures of Superboy #21) and a Scooby-Doo mini-comic.

Perhaps Dooley's most notable accomplishment during his time at DC was overseeing the Emerald Twilight storyline, which marked a major shift in Green Lantern, specifically the Hal Jordan Green Lantern, a long-standing marquee character for DC comics, who was replaced by a younger character, Kyle Rayner.

Beyond Green Lantern, Dooley also oversaw the Aquaman series, wherein Aquaman had his left hand chewed off by piranha to be replaced by a hook. Among the other titles Dooley edited were Sovereign Seven and Vext.

Before Dooley came to DC, from 1986 to 1988 he edited Fantagraphics' Amazing Heroes. Dooley left the employ of DC Comics in 1999.
