= Plop! =

Comic book anthology series

- Cover of Plop! #1 (Sept.-Oct. 1973), art by Basil Wolverton.

Publication information
- Publisher: DC Comics
- Schedule: Bi-monthly
- Format: Ongoing series
- Genre: Horror, humor/comedy
- Publication date: September/October 1973 – November/December 1976
- No. of issues: 24

Creative team
- Written by: Steve Skeates
- Artist(s): Sergio Aragonés; Basil Wolverton; Wally Wood
- Editor: Joe Orlando

Plop!, "The New Magazine of Weird Humor!", is a comic book anthology series published by DC Comics in the mid-1970s. It falls into the horror / humor genre. It lasted 24 issues and the series ran from Sept./Oct. 1973 to Nov./Dec. 1976.

== Origin ==
According to Steve Skeates, Plop! was based around "The Poster Plague", a quirky story illustrated by Sergio Aragonés and published in House of Mystery.

The title initially was intended to be called Zany. A number of the one-panel cartoons published in the comic included the visible prefix ZA, in reference to the originally intended title. Sergio Aragonés credits publisher Carmine Infantino with coming up with the final title:

"Joe Orlando and I were sitting in a restaurant talking with Carmine Infantino. They wanted a magazine that was different, something about black humor. Carmine came up with the name. We were talking about it and he said, 'What will we call it?' And I said, 'We can call it anything, because if the magazine is good, then it will stay'. And he said, 'No, we can't call it, for instance...PLOP!' And I said, 'Yes, we can'. And so I started making sketches of things going PLOP! and they laughed and decided the name was good".

== Contents ==
Each issue contained a frame story hosted by three ghoulish characters with Biblical names: Cain, Abel (previously introduced in The House of Mystery and The House of Secrets, respectively) and Eve. An issue would typically contain a story told by each of the characters, each bidding to outdo the others in fiendishness.

The most common method of story generation was for Steve Skeates would write full scripts. Due to a brief feud with editor Joe Orlando, for a time Skeates' stories were written under the pseudonym Chester P. Hazel. Other stories were created from plot ideas submitted by readers of the anthology. Orlando would select which plot ideas would be used and Skeates would then write the full story. The third way was for Aragonés to write the plot and draw the story, after which a writer would supply words.

A tale drawn by Berni Wrightson in #1 entitled "The Gourmet" had a gourmand whose love for frog legs leads to revenge by the now legless frogs.

Basil Wolverton and Wally Wood provided covers for the first 19 issues, each depicting a freakish character. The cover borders hosting a plethora of creatures were drawn by Sergio Aragonés. All three artists had worked on MAD, and the logo of Plop! is reminiscent of the early logo of that magazine. Wolverton's covers were not drawn for Plop!; they were inventory pieces which he sent to DC Comics as a general submission. When all of the drawings he submitted were found suitable for use in Plop!, Wolverton briefly came out of retirement so that he could continue drawing covers for the magazine. After he had a stroke, the magazine turned to Wood as the new cover artist.

Aragonés drew the majority of the frame stories. Later MAD contributor Dave Manak also did art.

The magazine was first published without ads. When sales proved insufficient, advertisements were brought in for later issues. The magazine sold so poorly that, even with the added advertising revenue, DC Comics lost money on each issue, leading to its cancellation.

== Awards ==
The series received a number of awards, including the Shazam Award for Best Humor Story in 1973 for "The Gourmet" in issue #1, and another nomination for the same award for "The Escape" in the same issue. Steve Skeates also won the Shazam Award for Best Writer (Humor Division) in 1973 for his work on the series. The comic was nominated for the Eagle Award for Favourite Comic (Humour) in 1977.

== Reprinted stories ==
- The Steve Ditko Omnibus Volume 1 includes Plop! #16: "Love is a Dandy!" by Steve Skeates and Steve Ditko, 480 pages, September 2011, ISBN 1-4012-3111-X
