= Mister Miracle =

DC Comics superhero

- The Scott Free incarnation of Mister Miracle as depicted in Mister Miracle #15 (September 1973). Art by Jack Kirby and Mike Royer.

Publication information
- Publisher: DC Comics
- First appearance: Mister Miracle #1 (April 1971)
- Created by: Jack Kirby

In-story information
- Alter ego: Scott Free
- Species: New God
- Place of origin: Apokolips, formerly New Genesis
- Team affiliations: New Gods; Justice League; Justice League International
- Notable aliases: Mr Miracle
- Abilities: Superhuman strength, speed, stamina, and durability; Superhumanly skilled escape artist; Immortality; Accelerated healing; Genius-level intellect; Proficient scientist and inventor; Indomitable will; Advanced hand-to-hand combatant; Knowledge of the Anti-Life Equation; The Alpha Effect; Teleportation; Heat vision; Carries a Mother Box, aero-discs, multi-cube and advanced gadgets

Mister Miracle is the name of three superheroes appearing in American comic books published by DC Comics. The first and third are humans Thaddeus Brown and Shilo Norman, while the second is New God Scott Free. The Scott Free incarnation of Mister Miracle first appeared in Mister Miracle #1 (April 1971) and was created by Jack Kirby.

The Scott Free incarnation of Mister Miracle has appeared in various media outside comics, primarily in association with the New Gods. Ioan Gruffudd, Yuri Lowenthal, Roger Craig Smith, and Andy Daly have voiced the character in animation. Josh Hutcherson will voice the character in the DC Universe, beginning with a self-titled animated series.

== Publication history ==
Mister Miracle debuted in the first issue of the eponymous series cover dated April 1971 as part of the Fourth World tetralogy. Big Barda, the character's love interest, was introduced in Mister Miracle #4 (October 1971). According to creator Jack Kirby's then-assistant Mark Evanier, Kirby wanted to be a comics creator and creative supervisor at DC Comics, rather than a regular writer-artist: "... we were going to turn Mr. Miracle over to Steve Ditko after a couple of issues and have me write it and Ditko draw it. Carmine Infantino, publisher of DC at the time, vetoed that and said Kirby had to do it all himself." Evanier unofficially co-plotted sequences in the fifth issue of the book.

The original title featuring Miracle was the longest-lasting of the Fourth World titles, lasting 18 issues while the other titles, New Gods and The Forever People, were cancelled after 11 issues. The only one of the Fourth World titles to focus on a single title character, the last seven issues as well as later incarnations of the series would downplay the Fourth World mythology in favor of complete-in-one-issue adventure stories and Scott Free's mentorship of the next Mr Miracle, a young Shilo Norman. Scott and Barda married in issue #18, the last issue of the original run. The Scott Free character teamed up with Batman three times in The Brave and the Bold. The title was revived in September 1977 by Steve Englehart and Marshall Rogers. Steve Gerber and Michael Golden continued the series for three issues ending with #25 (September 1978) leaving several story lines unresolved. Mister Miracle teamed with Superman in DC Comics Presents #12 (August 1979) and met the Justice League of America and the Justice Society of America in Justice League of America #183–185 (October–December 1980).

When the character was revived as part of the Justice League International lineup in 1987, a one-shot special by writer Mark Evanier and artist Steve Rude was published in 1987. This special was followed by an ongoing series that began in January 1989, written by J. M. DeMatteis and drawn by Ian Gibson. Other writers who contributed to the title include Keith Giffen, Len Wein, and Doug Moench. This run lasted 28 issues before cancellation in 1991. The series was largely humor-driven, per Giffen's reimagining Scott Free, his wife Big Barda, and their friend Oberon, who pretended to be Scott's uncle, as living in suburbia when they were not fighting evil with the Justice League.

In 1996, a series written by Kevin Dooley showed Scott attempting to escape his destiny as a New God by working for a charitable foundation in New York. This ran for seven issues, before all Fourth World titles were canceled for the launch of Jack Kirby's Fourth World.

In addition, Scott's ally and wife Big Barda was made a member of the revived Justice League and appeared regularly in the Jack Kirby's Fourth World series by John Byrne.

With the launching of Grant Morrison's meta-series Seven Soldiers (2005–2006), Mister Miracle was revived as a four-issue miniseries. This miniseries focused instead on Scott's sidekick and apprentice Shilo Norman, who died.

In 2017, the character returned in a 12-issue limited series written by Tom King and illustrated by Mitch Gerads.

From July 2021 to January 2022, Mister Miracle: The Source of Freedom was published as a six issue miniseries starring Shilo Norman as Mister Miracle. The series was written by Brandon Easton and drawn by Fico Ossio.

== Fictional character biography ==
Mister Miracle was one of four DC Comics series in Kirby's ambitious, but short-lived, Fourth World saga. Mister Miracle, Super Escape Artist was inspired by comic book writer/artist Jim Steranko. Mister Miracle's relationship with his wife Big Barda is based on Kirby's relationship with his own wife Roz.

=== Thaddeus Brown ===
Thaddeus Brown is a circus escape artist whose stage name is Mister Miracle. As the first escape artist to use the name Mister Miracle, Brown earns a modest living and practices his art into his later years. Brown meets Scott Free as he is practicing an outdoor escape with his long-time friend and assistant Oberon. Scott then aids Brown as he is being coerced by thugs working for Intergang member Steel Hand. While practicing an escape of being tied to a tree with a projectile speeding toward him, Brown is killed by a sniper working for Steel Hand. After Brown's murder, Scott takes his costume and the mantle of Mister Miracle.

Following The New 52 and DC Rebirth relaunches, Brown's history remains intact, though it is claimed that he may have faked his death. Brown is also revealed to have been part of a group called Justice Society Dark in the 1940s.

=== Scott Free ===
Cover to Mister Miracle #1 (April 1971), art by Jack Kirby and Vince Colletta.

Scott Free is the son of Highfather, the ruler of New Genesis, and his wife, Avia. As part of a diplomatic move to stop a war with the planet Apokolips, Highfather agreed to an exchange of heirs with Darkseid, the ruler of Apokolips. Scott was traded for Darkseid's second-born son Orion.

Scott grows up in one of Granny Goodness' orphanages with no knowledge of his heritage, but refuses to allow his spirit to break under the institution's training. As he matures, Scott rebels against the totalitarian ideology of Apokolips. Hating himself for being unable to fit in despite his unfailing defiance of the abuse he suffered, Scott is influenced by Metron to see a future beyond Darkseid. Scott joins a small band of pupils led by Himon, a New Genesian who has infiltrated Apokolips. At these meetings, Scott meets Big Barda, a lieutenant in Darkseid's Female Furies.

Eventually, Free escapes and flees to Earth. His escape, long anticipated and planned for by Darkseid, nullifies the pact between Darkseid and Highfather, allowing Darkseid to revive his war with New Genesis. Once on Earth, Free meets circus escape artist Thaddeus Brown, whose stage name was Mister Miracle. Brown is impressed with Scott's skills (especially as supplemented with Apokoliptian technology). Scott befriends Brown's assistant, a dwarf named Oberon. When Brown is murdered, Free assumes the identity of Mister Miracle. Barda later follows Scott to Earth and the two battle Darkseid, who seeks to capture them. Eventually, tired of being chased by Darkseid's servants, Scott returns to Apokolips and wins his freedom through trial by combat.

Scott later joins Justice League International alongside Barda and Oberon. This recast Scott and Barda as semi-retired super-heroes who seek to live peaceful civilian lives. In particular, Scott is recast as a hen-pecked husband who often finds himself on the receiving end of Barda's temper over her desire to live a quiet life on Earth.

During his time in the League, Scott develops an intense rivalry with Manga Khan. Khan repeatedly kidnaps Scott, convincing Scott's conniving former manager Funky Flashman into forging documents that force Scott to work for Manga as his personal entertainer. To force him to go along willingly, Khan replaces Scott with a lifelike robot who is later destroyed by Despero. Scott ultimately escapes from Khan's clutches and reunited with his wife and friends, though the shock leads Scott to quit the League and take on Shilo Norman as his protégé.

In September 2011, The New 52 rebooted DC's continuity. In this new timeline, Mister Miracle appears alongside Big Barda flying around the ruins of Gotham City on Earth 2. Their purpose is revealed to find the mysterious new Batman, which is thwarted when both are attacked by Fury.

=== Shilo Norman ===
Shilo Norman, Mister Miracle #1 Art by Pasqual Ferry.

Abandoned by his mother when he was only an infant, Shilo Norman's desire to escape was fostered in an abusive orphanage. He eventually runs away and ends up on the streets near the informal ward of Thaddeus Brown (the original Mister Miracle), and he served as an occasional stand-in. When Brown is murdered by Steel Hand, Scott Free avenges his death by taking on the identity of Mister Miracle and bringing Steel Hand to justice. Shilo also works with Scott and his wife Barda. Shilo later becomes security chief of the Slab, a maximum-security prison.

Shilo Norman also appears in Mister Miracle: The Source of Freedom, a six-issue miniseries spinning out of the events of "DC Future State" and tying into "Infinite Frontier".

== Powers and abilities ==
Like all the New Gods, Scott Free is functionally immortal; having stopped aging around the age of 30, he has developed an immunity to toxins and diseases. Scott has super strength, agility, speed, coordination and reflexes, along with extreme stamina.

During his life on Apokolips, Scott was instructed by Himon in the science and use of advanced Fourth World's technology. He has designed most of the equipment in his costume, including his Mother Box.

Scott was trained by Granny Goodness as an Aero-trooper. Although he despises violence and is often portrayed as a pacifist, he is still an exceptional warrior, instructed in all combat techniques of Apokolips and very skilled with weapons. Also, he is a master escapologist and acrobat. He is considered better at escapes than Batman.

Scott Free is heir of the Alpha Effect, the antithesis of Darkseid's Omega Energy. This power was almost unlimited and allowed him to manipulate energy in many ways. Also, Mister Miracle used his godlike powers to resurrect his wife and battle against Steppenwolf and Kalibak, temporarily stopping the war between New Genesis and Apokolips. Later, Scott relinquished his heritage.

Scott possesses greater power as the embodiment of the Anti-Life Equation. The ability is fueled by rage and negative emotions. The Anti-Life Equation can give any being the power to dominate the will of all sentient and sapient races and alter the reality, space, time, matter and anti-matter at the cosmic level. Mister Miracle proved to be powerful enough to fight Superman and Orion together.

=== The New 52 ===
In The New 52 reboot, Mister Miracle retains the status of a New God and has been reborn more powerful than before. Mister Miracle is able to lift at least 50 tons. He is shown to have a high level of invulnerability; enduring space's rigors, surviving the explosion of three "Boom Spheres", resisting attacks of powerful beings such as Darkseid. His combined reflexes, speed and agility make him able to dodge almost any attack, even from two Apokalitian assassins, as he did with Lashina and Kanto. In addition, Mister Miracle has a limited healing factor and a great variety of mental tricks that allow him to break free of psychic influence. Mister Miracle is still a super escape artist and an expert combatant, successfully defeating Fury, Wonder Woman's daughter.

=== Equipment ===
- Mother Box: The Mother Box can access the energy of the Source for various effects; it can change the gravitational constant of an area, transfer energy from one place to another, sense danger, sense of life, create force fields, transmute matter, absorb or project powerful shock blasts, create electro-webs of atoms, control the mental state of a being, communicate telepathically with a host or other life form, manipulate the life-force of a host to sustain it past fatal injuries, and teleport via Boom Tubes.
- Costume: Mister Miracle's costume is magnetically sealed and provides limited protection from damage and fire. It contains numerous hidden pockets. Each glove and boot has a pocket and the utility belt contains half a dozen more. A secret pocket on the upper right arm hides his Mother Box.
- Mask: Contains circuitry for his Mother Box and a life support unit. The circuits let Scott use his Mother Box hands free. The life support system lets him survive in hostile environments.
- Gloves: Have wide cuffs that hold Scott's multi-cube and assorted picks. In addition, the gloves can fire concussive blasts and generate enormous electric power, and contain a fingertip laser for fine welding or burning. His hidden circuits have the ability to create fission blasts and mini shockwaves.
- Boots: Contain laser-jets capable of burning almost any surface.
- Cape: Is made of a memory fibroid from New Genesis. Scott's Mother Box can transmute the cape into a cocoon that can withstand a sizable explosion. This can only be done once. The transmutation is not permanent and destroys the cape.
- Aero Discs: Thin metal plates about a foot across. The New Gods use them for personal travel. They can reach speeds of 250 mph. Scott has modified his discs considerably for battle. They can be attached to the forearms to use them as shields or blades.
- Multi-Cube: A peripheral device for Mister Miracle's Mother Box. The cube was designed by Mister Miracle to use the transmutation power of the Mother Box to create a number of preset mechanisms in its interior. All of these functions are much easier to perform than improvised transmutation. They can be activated in stressful situations. The cube is small enough to be hidden in the palm of the hand. The multi-cube is not sentient but is still capable of interpreting complex commands and recording data. The multi-cube can fly under its own power and follow the mental commands of Mister Miracle. The cube can use the transmuting power of the Mother Box to create several hundred feet of swing line. Besides the cable, the cube can produce a smoke screen or fire suppression foam. The simplest use of the cube is to generate light effects. The cube can create lifelike holograms, a blinding flash or a laser capable of cutting through a steel cable or handcuff links. In hologram mode the cube can record extended scenes or make a complete holographic recording. It can then manipulate the playback to simulate the subject in motion. The cube can emit a powerful sonic beam that can spring locks or shatter a brick wall. The sound blast can stun an unprotected human.

== Other versions ==
- An alternate timeline version of Mister Miracle appears in Kingdom Come.
- An alternate universe version of Mister Miracle who became Metron's successor appears in Superman: The Dark Side.
- An alternate universe version of Mister Miracle appears in JLA: The Nail. This version downloaded himself into Barda's Mother Box before being killed by DeSaad. The Box's circuitry later bonds with a Green Lantern ring, allowing him to project his consciousness into an energy construct similar to his original body.
- The character has a cameo (identified only as "Scott Free") in "Passengers," an issue of Neil Gaiman's run of The Sandman. Morpheus visits him to ascertain the whereabouts of the Dreamstone that was taken from him and found its way into the possession of the Justice League. Scott leads him to Martian Manhunter, who directs Morpheus to the place where the Dream stone can be found.

== In other media ==
=== Television ===
- The Scott Free incarnation of Mister Miracle appears in series set in the DC Animated Universe (DCAU), voiced by Ioan Gruffudd as an adult and Zack Shada as a child.
- The Scott Free incarnation of Mister Miracle appears in Batman: The Brave and the Bold, voiced by Yuri Lowenthal.
- The Scott Free incarnation of Mister Miracle appears in the Justice League Action episode "It'll Take a Miracle!", voiced by Roger Craig Smith.
- The Scott Free incarnation of Mister Miracle makes a cameo appearance in the Harley Quinn episode "Inner (Para) Demons", voiced by Andy Daly.
- The Scott Free incarnation of Mister Miracle will appear in a self-titled animated series set in the DC Universe (DCU), voiced by Josh Hutcherson.

=== Film ===
- An alternate universe version of Scott Free / Mister Miracle makes a non-speaking appearance in a flashback in Justice League: Gods and Monsters.
- The Scott Free incarnation of Mister Miracle was intended to appear in a New Gods film, with director Ava DuVernay and comic writer Tom King attached to the production, before the project was cancelled in April 2021.

=== Video games ===
- The Scott Free incarnation of Mister Miracle appears in DC Universe Online via the "Halls of Power" DLC trilogy.
- The Scott Free incarnation of Mister Miracle appears as a character summon in Scribblenauts Unmasked: A DC Comics Adventure.
- The Scott Free incarnation of Mister Miracle appears as a playable character in Lego DC Super-Villains, voiced again by Roger Craig Smith.

=== Music ===
- American rapper Isaiah Rashad cited the character as one of the primary sources on his album The House is Burning.

== Collected editions ==
- Jack Kirby's Mister Miracle: Super Escape Artist collects Mr Miracle #1–10, 256 pages, September 1998, ISBN 978-1563894572
- Jack Kirby's Fourth World: Featuring Mister Miracle collects Mr Miracle #11–18, 187 pages, July 2001, ISBN 978-1563897238
- Jack Kirby's Fourth World Omnibus
  - Volume 1 collects Forever People #1–3, Mister Miracle #1–3, The New Gods #1–3, Superman's Pal Jimmy Olsen #133–139, 396 pages, May 2007, ISBN 978-1401213442 (hardcover); December 2011, ISBN 978-1401232412 (paperback)
  - Volume 2 collects Forever People #4–6, Mister Miracle #4–6, The New Gods #4–6, Superman's Pal Jimmy Olsen #141–145, 396 pages, August 2007, ISBN 978-1401213572 (hardcover); April 2012, ISBN 978-1401234409 (paperback)
  - Volume 3 collects Forever People #7–10, Mister Miracle #7–9, The New Gods #7–10, Superman's Pal Jimmy Olsen #146–148, 396 pages, November 2007, ISBN 978-1401214852 (hardcover); August 2012, ISBN 978-1401235352 (paperback)
  - Volume 4 collects Forever People #11; Mister Miracle #10–18; The New Gods #11; "Even Gods Must Die" from The New Gods vol. 2 #6; DC Graphic Novel #4: "The Hunger Dogs"; "On the Road to Armagetto!" (previously unpublished), 424 pages, March 2008, ISBN 978-1401215835 (hardcover); December 2012, ISBN 978-1401237462 (paperback)
- Mister Miracle by Steve Englehart and Steve Gerber collects Mister Miracle #19–25, 216 pages, March 2020, ISBN 978-1779500793

== Awards ==
The Mister Miracle series plus Forever People, New Gods, and Superman's Pal Jimmy Olsen earned Jack Kirby the 1971 Shazam Award for Special Achievement by an Individual in the comic industry.

The Mister Miracle series by Tom King and Mitch Gerads won the 2019 Eisner Award for Best Limited Series.

== See also ==
- Jack Kirby bibliography
