= Steve Skeates =

American comic creator (1943–2023)

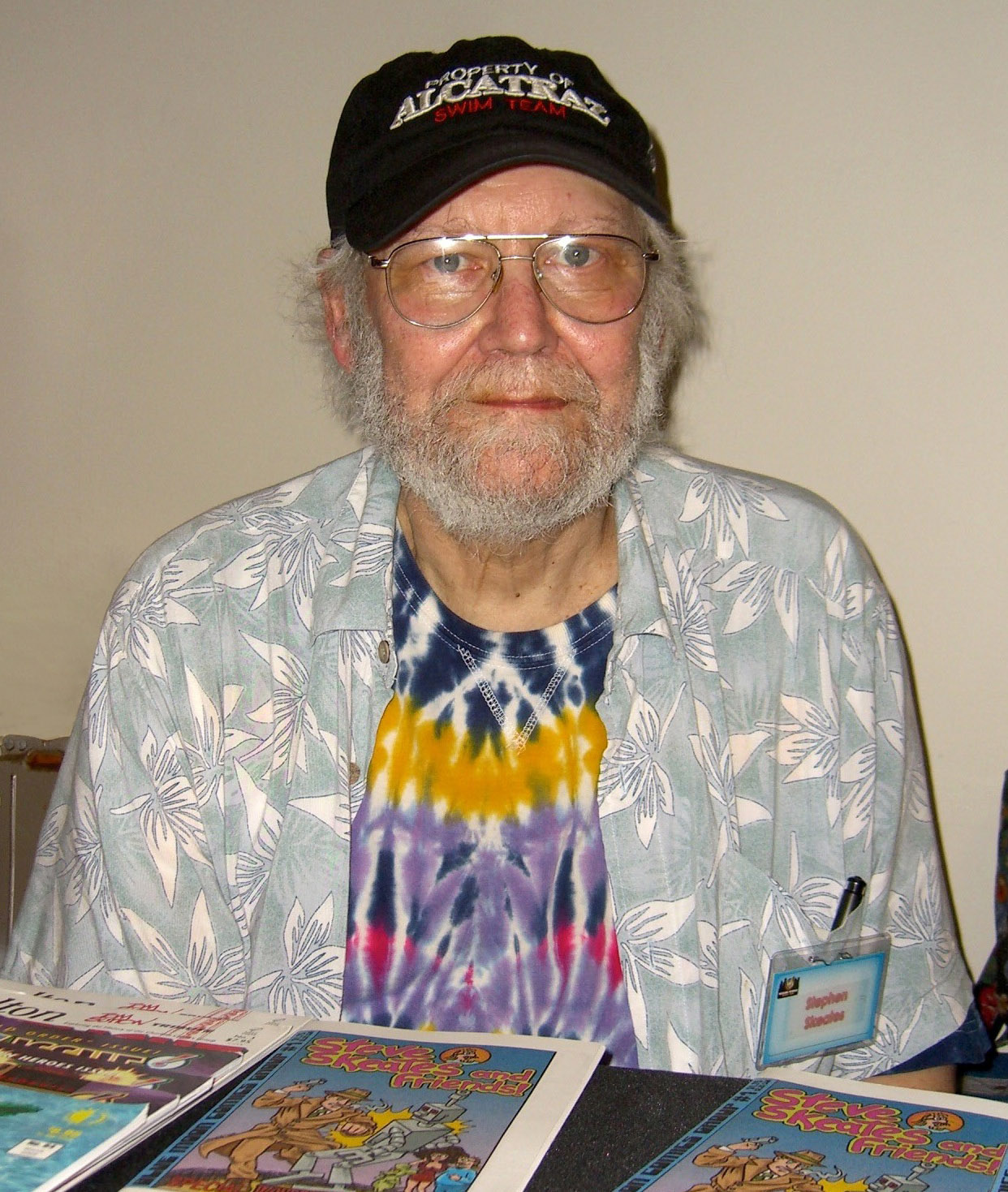
- Skeates at the 2011 Big Apple Comic Con
- Born: Stephen Skeates; January 29, 1943 Rochester, New York, U.S.
- Died: March 30, 2023 (aged 80) Rochester, New York, U.S.
- Area: Writer
- Pseudonyms: Chester Hazel; Warren Savin
- Notable works: Aquaman; Hawk and Dove; House of Mystery; Warren Publishing titles
- Awards: Shazam Award 1972, 1973; Warren Award 1973; Bill Finger Award 2012
- Children: Melissa

Stephen Skeates (/skeɪts/; January 29, 1943 – March 30, 2023) was an American comic book creator known for his work on such titles as Aquaman, Hawk and Dove, T.H.U.N.D.E.R. Agents, and Plop!. He also wrote under the pseudonyms Chester P. Hazel and Warren Savin.

== Early life ==
Stephen Skeates was born in Rochester, New York, on January 29, 1943. He and his parents lived in the attic of his maternal grandmother's Fairport home until he was four and a half, at which time they and his baby brother moved into a two-story home that his father and uncle had built. His parents tended to describe him as "a dreamer" because he preferred to play alone rather than interact with other children. He enjoyed reading comic books, preferring cartoon animal antics to the superhero titles. From an early age, he wanted to become a writer, but he found that ambition hampered by the fact that he read very slowly. So, in junior high school and later at Fairport High School, he was drawn to humorists such as James Thurber, Donald Ogden Stewart, S.J. Perelman, and Robert Benchley, who wrote short works. He also loved the parody stories in EC Comics' MAD, subscribing to its comic book incarnation. Skeates set his sights on becoming a humorist himself and writing for magazines, but the popularity of television in the fifties drove many publications out of business.

Still desiring a writing career, Skeates chose his college based on catalog recommendations that it was a good school for writers. However, when he entered Alfred University in 1961, he chose math as his major, which he later called "a truly silly idea from the start." After a year, he changed to English Literature. Despite what the college catalogs had indicated, Alfred offered only one two-credit creative-writing course, in which the instructor, Dr. Ernest Finch, required the composition of only three short stories. As he approached graduation still undecided on a career, Skeates half-heartedly applied to various metropolitan newspapers for reporting jobs. It was at about this time that he discovered the new Marvel Comics being written by Stan Lee and drawn by Jack Kirby, Steve Ditko, and Don Heck. He became an instant fan. Then, "on a whim," he sent the four major comic book firms application letters in the form of comic book captions, "but with me as the central character rather than some superhero!" Marvel editor-writer Lee himself called with the offer of a job as his assistant.

== Career ==
=== The 1960s and early 1970s ===
In 1965, Skeates moved to New York City to become Lee's assistant editor, which largely required him to proofread finished comics. His lack of skill for this quickly became apparent, and Lee grew frustrated when obvious artwork errors were overlooked. Within two weeks, Roy Thomas became the new assistant, and Skeates was assigned to write westerns as compensation. Using his brief term as Lee's assistant as a calling card, Skeates picked up work at Tower, Charlton, DC, Gold Key, Red Circle, Archie, and Warren Publishing (for whom he wrote 72 stories from 1971 to 1975). His stories were illustrated by such artists as Jim Aparo, Dick Ayers, Gene Colan, Alex Toth, Gil Kane, Ogden Whitney, Ramona Fradon, Mike Grell, Wally Wood, and Dick Giordano.

After penning two tales for the second issue of Charlton's mystery anthology The Many Ghosts of Doctor Graves (July 1967) — one of which, "The Mystic Book," is a favorite of his — Skeates was given total control of the writing for the title, including introductory pages, through issue #12. With cartoonist Sergio Aragonés, he won the ACBA Shazam Award for the best humor story of 1972, which was "The Poster Plague," a tale that inspired DC's dark-humor anthology Plop!, the series about which Skeates professed to be the proudest because it "spoke quite emphatically to the disillusionment extant at least throughout this country during the so-called Watergate era." In 1973, he shared the best humor story award with Bernie Wrightson for "The Gourmet" (Plop #1), which has been reprinted more than any other Skeates-written work.

=== Favorite co-workers ===
Of all of his artistic collaborators, Skeates named as his favorites Pat Boyette, with whom he worked at Charlton (his favorite employer); Jim Aparo, his partner on a highly regarded Aquaman run that lasted until April 1971; and Steve Ditko, with whom he co-created the quirky team Hawk and Dove in Showcase #75 (June 1968), despite the fact that progressive Skeates and Objectivist Ditko are politically polar opposites. During the 1970s he began a long-standing collaboration with fellow comics writer Mary Skrenes.

=== Plastic Man ===
One of the series Skeates wrote at DC in the 1970s was Plastic Man, for which he created the villain Carrot Man, an evil game show host who hit contestants on their heads with a toaster. When that character appeared on the Plastic Man animated show, his creator received no royalties, but the showrunners "tried to make good" by changing Carrot Man's true identity to Stephen Skeates. As a result, people would stop the writer on the street and say, "You were on TV!"

=== The 1980s ===
In the early 1980s, Skeates was working for comics "from a distance," writing for Gold Key and Marvel through the mail. In 1984, while he was taking various story ideas into editors' offices, Marvel's Larry Hama tapped him to script the Generic Comic Book, which he did anonymously. During the mid-1980s he also co-wrote a handful of episodes of Transformers, G.I. Joe: A Real American Hero, and Jem.

By the late 1980s, Skeates felt burnt out from trying to write comics for the more demanding hardcore fans and left the industry to take up bartending. This left him with a creative need that was going unfulfilled, so he finally went to the only daily newspaper in the area of his residence and presented its editor with the idea for a locally oriented comic strip called The Adventures of Stew Ben and Alec Gainey, that Skeates would write and draw for the Sunday Spectator, which was the Sunday paper for both The Hornell Tribune (Steuben) and The Wellsville Daily Reporter (Allegany). While it looked like a humor strip, it was actually a continuing adventure story about two private eyes. Skeates was initially afraid that his little section of New York State wasn't ready for the "bizarre mish-mash of stuff that didn't quite mesh" which he was turning out, but readers caught on quickly. The newspaper's publisher did not, however, and wanted the strip canned, but the supportive editor convinced his employer to let the subscribers decide by way of a ballot placed in the paper. Skeates made a bundle of ballot photocopies and bribed his regulars with free drinks to save the strip. After a year (summer 1989-summer 1990) of producing "that very strange little avant-garde entity," Skeates ended his "most interesting experience within the wonderful world of comics" by having his protagonists sacrifice themselves to save the Earth.

=== 1990s–2010s ===
Skeates moved back to Rochester in 1993 or 1994 to help his mother care for his father, who had developed Parkinson's disease. In 2000, he began writing articles about comics for Charlton Spotlight, and he continued that until 2006. In 2011, Surprising Comics head Mark Davis found some of Skeates's Facebook postings and asked him to write SC's water-based hero Depthon, Son of the Ocean, so he produced a five-page story, with art and lettering by Kenneth M. Johnson, that appeared in All-Surprising Comics #1. He then scripted a seven-pager that was illustrated by Ron Stewart and appeared in Monty's World #1. The fate of a third Depthon script is unknown to Skeates. A number of smaller comics companies proceeded to contact Skeates, including Canada-based Red Lion, whose editor-publisher, Jonathan A. Gilbert, wanted to revive an unsold talking-animal property called Stateside Mouse, which Skeates and artist Joe Orsak had developed twenty years earlier as a World War II-era adventure series (It remains unpublished, but Skeates and Orsak still have hopes for it). At the same time, Skeates self-published a 22-page magazine-sized comic called “Could I Have My Reality Check Please?” which was created in the style of the Underground comix of the sixties and seventies and sold at conventions.

At San Diego Comic-Con in July 2012, Skeates received the Bill Finger Award for Excellence in Comic Book Writing. He began writing for The Charlton Arrow anthology series in 2014. In 2018, two unpublished stories originally written by Skeates and penciled by George Wildman in 1978-1979 for the Underdog comic series by Warren Publishing were completed and published in Underdog 1975 #1 by American Mythology.

From 1996 to 2012, Skeates was the editor of the PCBN (Peoples' Comic Book Newsletter). A fanzine that promoted upcoming comic books artists and writers.

Canadian comics creator Jonathan A. Gilbert wrote of Skeates, "The reason Steve is such an influence on me creatively is because of his unique writing style. He is not what I would call a 'pretty writer' but rather takes a subject and puts a unique twist on it that no one else had even considered. He can make the old look new again which is a rare talent in our business."

== Awards ==
- 1972 Shazam Award: Best Humor Story, "The Poster Plague" in House of Mystery #201 (with Sergio Aragonés)
- 1973 Warren Award: for Best All Around Writer
- 1973 Shazam Award: for Best Writer (Humor Division)
- 1973 Shazam Award: Best Humor Story, "The Gourmet" in Plop! #1
- 2012 Bill Finger Award

== Bibliography ==
=== AC Comics ===
- The Charlton Arrow vol. 2 #2 (2017)

=== American Mythology ===
- Underdog 1975 #1 (2018)

=== Archie Comics ===
- Red Circle Sorcery #6–7 (1974)

=== Atlas/Seaboard Comics ===
- Western Action #1 (1975)
- Wulf the Barbarian #3 (1975)

=== Charlton Comics ===
- Abbott & Costello #1–11 (1968–1969)
- Blue Beetle #4 (Question backup story) (1967)
- Charlton Premiere vol. 2 #1, 4 (1967–1968)
- Go-Go #7–8 (1967)
- The Gunfighters #52 (1967)
- Hercules #1–13 (Thane of Bagarth backup stories) (1967–1968)
- Judomaster #95–98 (Sarge Steel backup stories) (1967)
- The Many Ghosts of Doctor Graves #2–13 (1967–1969)
- Outlaws Of The West #66–79 (1967–1970)
- Peacemaker #4–5 (Fightin' 5 backup stories) (1967)
- Secret Agent #10 (Sarge Steel) (1967)
- Timmy the Timid Ghost #6 (1968)

=== Comicfix ===
- The Charlton Arrow #2–3 (2014)

=== DC Comics ===
- 1st Issue Special #11 (Codename: Assassin) (1976)
- Adventure Comics #417, 421–424, 427–429, 432–433, 435–436, 449 (1972–1977)
- The Amazing World of DC Comics #13 (1976)
- Aquaman #40–56 (1968–1971)
- Blackhawk #244–246, 249–250 (1976–1977)
- Date with Debbi #1–3 (1969)
- Debbi's Dates #1–5 (1969–1970)
- DC Graphic Novel #2 (1984)
- DC Super Stars #13 (1977)
- The Flash #202, 204, 207, 209–211, 216 (1970–1972)
- Forbidden Tales of Dark Mansion #10 (1973)
- Hawk and Dove #1–4 (1968–1969)
- House of Mystery #201–202, 209, 213–214, 217, 224, 251, 254, 256, 261, 310, 313 (1972–1983)
- House of Secrets #84, 93, 97, 103, 105, 107, 117–118, 120, 125–126, 131, 134–135, 139, 143–144 (1970–1977)
- The Mighty Isis #2–4 (1976–1977)
- Mystery in Space #114 (1980)
- Phantom Stranger vol. 2 #18–19, 22, 27–30, 34 (1972–1974)
- Plastic Man #11–13, 15–16 (1976–1977)
- Plop! #1–2, 4, 6–11, 13, 15–20, 22, 24 (1973–1976)
- Secrets of Haunted House #8, 42 (1977–1981)
- Secrets of Sinister House #10 (1973)
- Showcase #75 (Hawk and Dove) (1968)
- Spectre #8 (1969)
- Star Spangled War Stories #184, 196, 199 (1975–1976)
- Super DC Giant #S-26 (Aquaman) (1971)
- Super-Team Family #3 (Flash and Hawkman teamup); #8–10 (Challengers of the Unknown) (1976–1977)
- Superman's Pal Jimmy Olsen #152–153 (1972)
- Teen Titans #28–32, 36 (1970–1971)
- Unknown Soldier #205–207 (1977)
- Weird Mystery Tales #4, 7, 11–12, 14, 21, 23 (1973–1975)
- Weird War Tales #32, 35, 46–49 (1974–1976)
- Weird Western Tales #32 (1976)
- The Witching Hour #6–7, 12, 26 (1969–1971)
- World's Finest Comics #203, 205, 214 (1971–1972)

=== Gold Key Comics ===
- The Twilight Zone #76 (1977)
- Underdog #7, 11–13, 17–18, 22–23 (1976–1979)
- Yosemite Sam and Bugs Bunny #44, 57 (1977–1978)

=== Marvel Comics ===
- Bizarre Adventures #30–34 (1982–1983)
- Chamber of Chills #4, 6 (1973)
- Crazy Magazine #68–69, 75, 77 (Howard the Duck backup stories); #79 (1980–1981)
- Generic Comic #1 (1984)
- Howard the Duck magazine #9 (1981)
- Journey into Mystery vol. 2 #1 (1972)
- Marvel Preview #23 (1980)
- Monsters Unleashed #3 (1973)
- Peter Porker, the Spectacular Spider-Ham #1–7, 10 (1985–1986)
- Savage Sword of Conan #98 (1984)
- Savage Tales vol. 2 #2, 6 (1985–1986)
- Sub-Mariner #72 (1974)
- Tower of Shadows #6 (1970)
- Two-Gun Kid #80 (1966)
- What If...? #23 ("What If Aunt May Had Been Bitten by That Radioactive Spider?") (1980)

=== Star Reach ===
- Star Reach #1–2 (1974–1975)
- Quack! #2 (1977)

=== Tower Comics ===
- Noman #1–2 (1966–1967)
- T.H.U.N.D.E.R. Agents #4–8, 11–14 (1966–1967)
- Undersea Agent #3–4 (1966)

=== Warren Publishing ===
- Creepy #38–42, 44, 47, 52–52, 58, 60–62, 64 (1971–1974)
- Eerie #31–34, 36–37, 39–41, 43, 48–50, 52, 54, 56–57, 60–63, 65, 67 (1971–1975)
- Vampirella #8, 10–11, 17, 20–24, 30–34, 39 (1970–1975)

=== Western Publishing ===
- Starstream #1–2 (1976)

== Television ==
- The Transformers: "The Face of the Nijika" (November 20, 1986)

Preceded by Bob Haney	Aquaman writer 1970–1971	Succeeded by David Michelinie (in 1977)
Preceded by Robert Kanigher	Teen Titans writer 1970–1971	Succeeded by Bob Haney
Preceded by Arnold Drake (in 1968)	Plastic Man writer 1976–1977	Succeeded by John Albano
