= Kamandi =

Fictional character

- Kamandi taken from the cover of Kamandi, The Last Boy on Earth #2 (December 1972), by Jack Kirby.

Publication information
- Publisher: DC Comics
- First appearance: Kamandi, The Last Boy on Earth #1 (October 1972)
- Created by: Jack Kirby

In-story information
- Species: Human
- Place of origin: Earth A.D.
- Team affiliations: Checkmate
- Notable aliases: Kingsley Jacobs; King
- Abilities: Skilled fighter
Kamandi, The Last Boy on Earth
- Cover for Kamandi, The Last Boy on Earth #1 (October 1972), art by Jack Kirby and Mike Royer.
Publication information
- Schedule: (vol. 1); Bimonthly; The Kamandi Challenge; Monthly
- Format: Ongoing series Limited series
- Genre: Science-fiction
- Publication date: List: (vol. 1) October 1972 – September 1978 The Kamandi Challenge March 2017 – February 2018
- No. of issues: (vol. 1): 59; The Kamandi Challenge: 12
- Main character(s): Kamandi; Dr. Canus; Pyra
Creative team
- Written by: List: (vol. 1) Jack Kirby Gerry Conway Elliot S. Maggin Dennis O'Neil Jack C. Harris The Kamandi Challenge Dan Abnett Peter Tomasi Jimmy Palmiotti James Tynion IV Bill Willingham Steve Orlando Marguerite Bennett Keith Giffen Tom King Greg Pak Rob Williams Gail Simone
- Penciller: List: (vol. 1) Jack Kirby Chic Stone Keith Giffen Dick Ayers The Kamandi Challenge Dale Eaglesham Neal Adams Amanda Conner Carlos D'Anda Ivan Reis Philip Tan Dan Jurgens Steve Rude Kevin Eastman Joe Prado Walter Simonson Ryan Sook
- Inker: List: (vol. 1) D. Bruce Berry Mike Royer Ernie Chan Alfredo Alcala

Kamandi (/kəˈmændi/) is a fictional comic book character created by artist Jack Kirby and published by DC Comics. The bulk of Kamandi's appearances occurred in the comic series Kamandi: The Last Boy on Earth, which ran from 1972 to 1978. He is a young hero living in a post-apocalyptic future. Following the Great Disaster, humans have backslid to savagery in a world ruled by intelligent, highly evolved animals.

== Publication history ==
=== Creation ===
DC editor Carmine Infantino had tried to acquire the license to publish Planet of the Apes comic books. After rival Marvel Comics acquired the rights, Infantino asked Jack Kirby for a series with a similar concept. Kirby had not seen the films, but knew the rough outline and had created a similar story, "The Last Enemy!", where a present-day man finds himself in a future where anthropomorphic animals have founded their own civilization. Kirby also had an unused comic strip he created in 1956, titled Kamandi of the Caves. Kirby brought these elements together to create Kamandi. Although his initial plan was not to work on the comic books personally, the cancellation of Forever People freed him up to do so.

=== The series ===
The Kamandi series was launched in October–November 1972, and was written and drawn by Jack Kirby. The book went to a monthly publishing schedule quickly, a sign of its early popularity.

Kirby provided art and story through the comic's 37th issue, in January 1976. Kirby also drew issues #38 through #40, although they were scripted by Gerry Conway. Kirby subsequently left DC. The series continued, initially with scripts by Conway and art by Chic Stone. Later issues were written by Paul Levitz, Dennis O'Neil, David Anthony Kraft, Elliot S. Maggin, and Jack C. Harris (alternating), with art by Pablo Marcos, Keith Giffen, and Dick Ayers. The title was canceled during the "DC Implosion" of 1978, despite respectable sales figures. The final published issue was #59, cover-dated September–October 1978. Two additional issues, completed but not released, were included in Cancelled Comic Cavalcade #2.

=== Entering the DC Universe ===
During Kirby's run on the book, Steve Sherman indicated in the letters column that the series was connected to Kirby's then-current OMAC series, which was set in the future, but prior to the Great Disaster. The only explicit connection to the DC Universe occurs in issue #29, in which Kamandi discovers a group of apes who worship Superman.

Other stories, not by Kirby, explicitly take place in the DC universe. Kamandi meets Batman in The Brave and the Bold #120 (July 1975) and #157 (December 1979). Superman #295 (January 1976) establishes that the costume seen in issue #29 is Superman's and that Earth A.D. is an alternate timeline. Issues #49–50 of the series establish Kamandi's grandfather to be Buddy Blank, the former OMAC, and features a brief return of his satellite ally Brother Eye. Cancelled Comic Cavalcade #2 guest stars Sandman and establishes that Jed Walker from The Sandman is the Earth-One counterpart of Kamandi.

The 1975–1977 Hercules Unbound series and the OMAC backup stories in Kamandi and The Warlord tie OMAC to the storyline of Hercules Unbound and the Atomic Knights, indicating the Great Disaster to be the atomic war of 1986 that precipitated the events of the latter. Superman #295 (Jan. 1976) implies the Great Disaster to be a natural occurrence.

DC Comics Presents #57 (May 1983) shows that the events of the Atomic Knights stories were a fantasy in the mind of Gardner Grayle, but DC Comics Presents #64 and Crisis on Infinite Earths #2 establish that Kamandi still exists in an alternate future of Earth-One.

Following Crisis on Infinite Earths, Earth-AD is erased from existence.

=== Revival ===
Cover for Countdown Special: Kamandi, The Last Boy on Earth, by Ryan Sook.

A young Kamandi and his grandfather Buddy Blank appear in Countdown to Final Crisis, which sees the beginning stages of the Great Disaster as a virus causes humans and animals to develop aspects of each other.

Kamandi also appears in Final Crisis, where he meets Anthro via a time distortion.

=== DC Rebirth ===
Cover of The Kamandi Challenge #2, art by Kenneth Rocafort. This 12-issue limited series brought Kamandi back to the DC Universe in 2017.

In January 2017, the miniseries The Kamandi Challenge was released to commemorate the 100th anniversary of Jack Kirby's birth. Each issues features a new writer and artist.

Writers on the series included Dan Abnett, Peter Tomasi, Jimmy Palmiotti, James Tynion IV, Bill Willingham, Steve Orlando, Marguerite Bennett, Keith Giffen, Tom King, Greg Pak, Rob Williams and Gail Simone while artists were Dale Eaglesham, Neal Adams, Amanda Conner, Carlos D'Anda, Ivan Reis, Philip Tan, Dan Jurgens, Steve Rude, Kevin Eastman, Joe Prado, Walter Simonson and Ryan Sook.

In Infinite Frontier, Kamandi travels back in time and establishes Checkmate under the alias Kingsley Jacobs.

== Fictional character biography ==
Map of Earth A.D. from Kamandi #32 (1975).

Kamandi is a teenage boy on a post-apocalyptic Earth dubbed Earth A.D. (After Disaster). The Earth has been ravaged by the mysterious Great Disaster, which devastated human civilization. Isolated pockets survive in underground bunkers, while most humans revert to savagery. By Kamandi's time, an unspecified period after the Great Disaster, the effects of radiation and the intelligence-enhancing drug Cortexin cause various animals to become anthropomorphic. Kamandi is the last survivor of the human outpost in the "Command D" bunker, from which his name is derived. After a wolf kills his grandfather, Kamandi leaves the bunker in search of other human outposts. He soon discovers that the only other intelligent humans left on Earth are Ben Boxer and his friends Steve and Renzi, a trio of genetically engineered mutants. He also makes a number of animal friends including the dog scientist Dr. Canus, the tiger king Caesar, and his son Tuftan. Later additions to the cast include the alien Pyra, the primitive girl Flower, her twin sister Spirit, detective Mylock Bloodstalker, and his associate Doile.

== Earth-AD characters ==
Besides Kamandi, the following reside on Earth-AD:

=== Supporting characters ===
- Ben Boxer - A human and one of the Nuclear People who fought the Tiger People.
- Buddy Blank - The grandfather of Kamandi.
- Dr. Canus - A dog scientist who works for Great Caesar.
- Flower - A primitive girl and the sister of Spirit. She was Kamandi's love interest. Flower was shot by the Puma Poarchers and was given a decent burial.
- Inspector Zeel - A dolphin inspector who is an ally of Kamandi and Ben Boxer.
- Mylock Bloodstalker - A bloodhound detective loosely based on Sherlock Holmes.
  - Doile - A bulldog and Mylock's associate. He is named after Arthur Conan Doyle, the creator of Sherlock Holmes, and modeled after Dr. Watson.
- Prince Tuftan - A tiger who is the son of Great Caesar.
- Pyra - An alien woman.
- Spirit - A primitive girl and the sister of Flower.
- Teela - A dolphin who took a shine to Kamandi.

=== Villains ===
- Dr. Skuba - A criminal mastermind who fought OMAC once.
- Great Caesar - The dictator of the Tiger People and the father of Prince Tuftan who has butted heads with Kamandi.
- Misfit - A short mutant.
- Ramjam - A gorilla member of the Ape People.
  - Tiny - A giant gorilla member of the Ape People.
- Sacker - A snake businessman who resides in the Tiger Empire. His main trade is human slavery.

=== Races ===
As mentioned above, most of the animals developed humanoid forms. Among the known humanoid animal tribes are:

- Ape People
- Barracuda People
- Bat People - The Bat People reside in the caves of South America.
- Boar People
- Caterpillar People
- Coyote People - The Coyote People live in Hollywood Hills.
- Crocodile People
- Dog People - Dr. Canus, Mylock Bloodstalker, and Doile are associated with this tribe.
- Dolphin People
- Gopher People - The Gopher People reside in the underground tunnels of what used to be Ohio.
- Leopard People - The Leopard People are scavengers and make use of technology found within the ruins of major cities. The technology at their disposal is equivalent to that of Earth of the late 20th century.
- Lion People - The Lion People reside in an area called the United States of Lions somewhere in the Pacific Northwest.
- Lizard People - The Lizard People reside in the Southwestern United States.
- Puma People - The Puma People that Kamandi had encountered were roving biker gangs.
- Rat People - The Rat People are a scavenger race who reside in the ruins of New York City. They are always pursuing Kamandi and are at odds with the Tiger People.
- Sloth People - The Sloth People reside in dense forests.
- Tiger People - The Tiger People are the most powerful and growing clans of the animal tribes. The Tiger People reside on the eastern seaboard where New York City used to stand. They are led by Great Caesar.
- Wolf People

== Other versions ==
- An alternate universe variant of Kamandi appears in Kamandi: At World's End and Superman: At Earth's End.
- Kamandi appears in Superman/Batman.
- Kamandi appears in Wednesday Comics.
- Kamandi appears in The Multiversity.

== In other media ==
=== Television ===
- A Kamandi animated series was optioned during the late 1970s, but was cancelled before entering the production phase.
- Kamandi appears in Batman: The Brave and the Bold, voiced by Mikey Kelley.

=== Film ===
- Kamandi appears in DC Showcase: Kamandi: The Last Boy on Earth!, voiced by Cameron Monaghan.
- Kamandi appears in Justice League: Crisis on Infinite Earths, voiced by Will Friedle.

=== Video games ===
Kamandi appears as a character summon in Scribblenauts Unmasked: A DC Comics Adventure.

=== Merchandise ===
Kamandi received a figure in the DC Universe Classics line in 2010.

=== Miscellaneous ===
Kamandi appears in Justice League Adventures #30.

== Collected editions ==
- Kamandi Archive:
  - Volume 1 collects Kamandi: The Last Boy on Earth #1-10, 224 pages, October 2005, ISBN 1-4012-0414-7
  - Volume 2 collects Kamandi: The Last Boy on Earth #11-20, 228 pages, February 2007, ISBN 1-4012-1208-5
- Countdown Special: Kamandi, the Last Boy on Earth 80-Page Giant #1 collects Kamandi: The Last Boy on Earth #1, #10 and #29.
- Kamandi by Jack Kirby Omnibus
  - Volume 1 collects Kamandi: The Last Boy on Earth #1-20, 448 pages, September 2011, ISBN 1-4012-3233-7
  - Volume 2 collects Kamandi: The Last Boy on Earth #21-40, 424 pages, December 2012, ISBN 1401236723
- Wednesday Comics collects Wednesday Comics #1-12, 200 pages, June 2010, ISBN 1401227473
- Kamandi by Jack Kirby Omnibus collects Kamandi: The Last Boy on Earth #1-40, 896 pages, March 2018, ISBN 1401274692
- The Kamandi Challenge collects The Kamandi Challenge #1-12, 460 pages, April 2018, ISBN 1401278361

== See also ==
- Jack Kirby bibliography
