= Silver Star (comics) =

American superhero comic book

- Cover to Silver Star #1 by Jack Kirby.

Publication information
- Publisher: Pacific Comics; Topps Comics; Dynamite Entertainment
- Genre: Superhero

Creative team
- Created by: Jack Kirby
- Written by: Jack Kirby
- Penciller: Jack Kirby
- Inker(s): Mike Royer (issues #1–4); D. Bruce Berry (issues #5–6)
- Letterer(s): Mike Royer (issues #1–4); D. Bruce Berry (issues #5–6)
- Colorist(s): Janice Cohen (issues #1–4); Tom Luth (issues #5–6)

Silver Star is an American superhero comic book series created, written, and drawn by Jack Kirby, first published by Pacific Comics in 1983. Featuring a title character who becomes super-powered due to genetic mutation, the series continued Kirby's run of creator-owned work. Reprints of the original series and new stories based on it have subsequently been published by other comic book companies.

== Publication history ==
The concept for Silver Star began in the mid-1970s as a movie screenplay by Jack Kirby and Steve Sherman. The final comic series was based on the initial screenplay, with some revision made by Kirby.

The original Pacific Comics series ran from February 1983 to January 1984, lasting six issues. The series was launched following the success of Kirby's previous creator-owned book for Pacific, Captain Victory and the Galactic Rangers. Silver Star follows the exploits of government agent Morgan Miller, who, after being transformed into a genetic mutant ("Homo Geneticus") by his father Dr. Bradford Miller, was appointed the task of fighting other super-powered beings. In the six-issue series Silver Star teams with fellow "Homo Geneticus" Norma Richmond (gifted with the ability to resist enormous stress) and Big Masai (a size changing mutant), and battles with the villainous Darius Drumm, an early subject of Dr. Bradford Miller's genetic structuring with the ability to warp reality.

Unlike the initial run of Marvel Comics' X-Men, also done by Kirby, in which the cast remains intact, the story kills off two potential members of the team before Silver Star could recruit them (one by an exploding baseball, the other by a circus act gone wrong), in issues #3 and #4. A secondary character is also killed (Floyd Custer, introduced in #1, killed in #2), and several disasters implying great loss of life are depicted in #2 and #6.

The original Pacific Comics series also featured additional back-up stories, including Steve Ditko's The Mocker (in issue #2), Mike Thibodeaux's Last of the Viking Heroes (in issues #1, #5, and #6), and Detective Flynn by Richard Kyle and D. Bruce Berry (in issues #3 and #4).

In 1993 Topps Comics planned to launch a new Silver Star as a part of its "Kirbyverse" imprint. The series, written by Kurt Busiek with art by James W. Fry III and Terry Austin, only lasted one issue before the line was cancelled, although the cover stated it was the first issue of four.

In 2007 Image Comics released a hardcover collection titled Jack Kirby's Silver Star. The collection featured all six issues of the original Pacific Comics series, with restored colors on issues #5 and #6 by comic artist Erik Larsen, plus the original screenplay by Kirby and Sherman.

The character appeared in the 2011 Dynamite Entertainment series Kirby: Genesis, which incorporates the pantheon of Kirby's creator-owned properties. In November Dynamite published a 6-issue tie-in Kirby Genesis: Silver Star miniseries, by writer Jai Nitz and artist Johnny D, featuring covers by Alex Ross, Jae Lee, and Mark Buckingham.

== Plot summary ==
A girl in a strange place "projects" a birthday song for a 21-year-old man called Morgan Miller while cryptically talking about several plot points, including Morgan's father. Simultaneously, Miller is an infantry soldier in Vietnam War who lifts a 40-ton tank, then suddenly collapses. Colonel Walter Hammer, M.D., treats Miller and orders a stuntman-like silver suit for him, claiming that Miller would die without it (Hammer compares the process to "stopping a leaking reactor with lead shielding"). The White House sends a high-ranking man, Floyd Custer, to make a report - they both find Miller unconscious. Miller is astral-travelling through several worlds to meet with the girl, Tracy, thanking her for the song but explaining that it will be dangerous for her to contact him again in the future: there is an imminent threat - a man who is hiding at that point. Meanwhile, Hammer explains to Floyd that the latter had worked with Miller's father, Bradford "Cowboy" Miller, in an experiment to create "homo geneticus", a new breed of man who can survive after a nuclear holocaust - albeit Hammer was reluctant in several points. A number of babies from different mothers were inoculated with implants and will become more than human. In the astral worlds, Miller wrestles a giant, growing to confront it (while also growing his comatose body on earth), then meets Darius Drumm. Drumm introduces himself and promises to kill Miller after he kills "the others" (later discovered to refer to "the other homo geneticus"). When Miller wakes up, Hammer christens him Silver Star.

Silver Star has demonstrated the skill to manipulate atoms, creating anything he wants to build a base of operations, shared with Hammer and Silver Star's father Dr. Miller. Hammer is growingly sceptic; although Miller insists that his son is a good man, other subjects may not be - indeed they are attacked by a giant bacillus sent by Drumm, proving Hammer's point. Although Silver Star saves them, Drumm also sends monsters after Floyd, killing him, then sending illusions to show his death to Silver Star, Hammer and Miller. Miller then reveals to Hammer that his superhumans can alter their aging: Silver Star looks no older than he was in Vietnam War (apparently ten years have passed since), and Drumm himself is a child in a man's body. Drumm recalls his past: just after birth, he was able to speak and make cultural references, then started manipulating his surrogate father to control the Foundation for Self-Denial, a sect whose business affairs Mr. Drumm handled. Darius Drumm then influenced the sectarians to murder his father and burn the buildings so he could escape, then began his quest to murder his own peers, creating a base of operation from which he could attack Silver Star. They are nonetheless in an impasse: whenever Drumm shoots, Silver Star generates a shield that protects him and his friends. This is not satisfactory, though: ten years ago, Drumm had damaged the nearby Coleman farm and the Millers could only save little Tracy Coleman - the girl in the first issue - by keeping her in stasis. Silver Star decides to recruit "the others" against Drumm.

Silver Star finds stuntwoman Norma Richmond in a film set. Knowing she is one of "the others", and that Drumm would attack them, Silver Star teletransports the whole film crew to his base. When they return, they see the remains of the attack, a huge bomb. Norma agrees to join Silver Star, then they leave for a baseball game, feeling that someone there is another superhuman. Batter John Blainey "Home-Run" Hunter, a perfect scorer, is thrown an explosive ball, and Silver Star understands the danger too late: the ball blows up and the whole crowd is killed. Separated from Silver Star, Norma is found and captured by Drumm. Silver Star reports to Hammer and Dr. Miller, while Drumm goes to a circus to see strongman Albie Reinhart. With Norma captured and unable to move, Drumm alters Reinhart's show so that it is more than even Reinhart's super-strong body can handle. Silver Star hears Reinhart's screams and teleports there.

Silver Star finds Reinhart too late, only to see him die. Drumm takes Norma to a cave; she shows courage confronting him there, but she can't escape. Silver Star then finds teenager Elmo Frye, known as the hero of the ghetto, Big Masai, but Elmo is not interested in Silver Star's quest, preferring to help his peers. Three gangsters - Sugar Man; Macho, the Flash; and Roswell Baggs - want to shake Frye off but, when they try using thugs and semiautomatic weapons, Frye becomes a 30-foot giant and gets rid of Sugar Man, then going after Macho, while Silver Star has a drink at a local bar, sharing philosophy with the bartender. Finally sick of waiting, Silver Star matches Masai's size, confronts him, and insists on the urgency of his quest.

Silver Star and Big Masai wrestle over the city, until Masai decides to end the fight by changing them both to human size and discuss the issue. Drumm listens to the conversation and gathers the sectarians as their army. The sectarians also try to keep Norma captive, but she is too strong and brazen for them – only Drumm's threat are useful, as her powers are not developed enough to match his. Silver Star finds Drumm's lair and teleports there, keeping Masai as a backup. The sectarians are offended by Silver Star's shining, sumptuous suit and attack him, but they fail. Drumm then arrives with Norma, who is now romantically interested in Silver Star after her time with irrational Drumm. Drumm explains his anti-social view and how his sect will get rid of perceived hedonists - albeit he had told Norma, and would tell Silver Star later, that he intended to wipe all the homo sapiens from the face of Earth. The sectarians attack, but they cannot defeat either Silver Star or Norma. Drumm is nonetheless calm, as the heroes cannot defeat him either. After the fight, Drumm changes his appearance to a winged creature to carry on with his plan.

Drumm's new aspect as the "Angel of Death" is received by his followers with cheers, while the heroes try to escape. Meanwhile, Silver Star telepathically contacts his allies outside to warn them, although there is little they can do. Norma and Silver Star share a kiss, then Norma leaves to warn the nearest town and try to protect it; Silver Star stays behind to confront Drumm's final form. They wrestle mid-flight, but Drumm's death powers rot Silver Star's body. Becoming little more than a skeleton in rugs of his suit, but still alive, Silver Star falls and tries to heal. Meanwhile, the USAF - alerted by Dr. Miller - attacks the Angel of Death, but they are unable to stop him from destroying suburbs and several areas. The Angel of Death reaches Redlands City, population ten million and, when he starts to kill people in the crowd - he sees that all of them have Darius Drumm's face - this is later revealed to have been an illusion staged by Silver Star. The Angel of Death, who is Drumm, cannot kill himself and, facing this paradox, he disintegrates. Due to his powers, he may survive, but Silver Star speculates that Drumm would be incapacitated for several centuries. Silver Star closes the story wondering whether the homo geneticus, designed to survive a nuclear holocaust, would be able to survive the confrontation with other homo geneticus.

== Bibliography ==
- Silver Star #1–6 (Pacific Comics)
- Jack Kirby's Silver Star (one-shot) (Topps Comics)
- Kirby: Genesis – Silver Star #1–7 (Dynamite Entertainment)

== Collected editions ==
- Jack Kirby's Silver Star (2007) collects the original six issues of the Pacific Comics series and the original screenplay by Kirby and Steve Sherman.
