= 1st Issue Special =

Comics anthology series from DC Comics

- 1st Issue Special #1 (April 1975), art by Jack Kirby and D. Bruce Berry.

Publication information
- Publisher: DC Comics
- Schedule: Monthly
- Format: Ongoing series
- Publication date: April 1975 – April 1976
- No. of issues: 13

Creative team
- Written by: List: Gerry Conway, Michael Fleisher, Mike Grell, Bob Haney, Robert Kanigher, Jack Kirby, Dennis O'Neil, Martin Pasko, Joe Simon, Steve Skeates
- Artist: List: Ramona Fradon, Jerry Grandenetti, Mike Grell, Walt Simonson, Mike Vosburg
- Penciller: List: Steve Ditko, Jack Kirby, Nestor Redondo, John Rosenberger
- Inker: List: D. Bruce Berry, Vince Colletta, Creig Flessel, Al Milgrom, Mike Royer

1st Issue Special is a comics anthology series from DC Comics, done in a similar style to their Showcase series. It was published from April 1975 to April 1976. The goal was to capitalize on the trend that the first issues of comic book series typically sell better than subsequent issues.

== Publication history ==
Writer Gerry Conway explained the series' origin: "1st Issue Special was a peculiar book concept based on [publisher] Carmine Infantino's observation that first issues of titles often sold better than subsequent issues. Carmine's brainstorm: a monthly series of nothing but first issues. It sounds like a joke, but he was dead serious."

Conway has also denied that 1st Issue Special was a tryout series, pointing out that tryout series run each feature for several issues so that the publisher has enough time to get sales figures before deciding whether to give the feature its own series; since each feature in 1st Issue Special ran only one issue, DC would have had to either launch the new series before sales figures came in for the tryout (thus making the feature's appearance in 1st Issue Special pointless) or launch the new series six months or more after the tryout issue (by which time reader interest in the feature would have faded). Conway added, "We used to sit at editorial meetings and [Carmine Infantino] would say, 'Who has an idea for 1st Issue Special next month?' How do you develop a project that has a potential to be a real series within 20 days? You can't." Only two of the 1st Issue Special features received an ongoing series: Mike Grell's The Warlord, which first appeared in issue #8 (November 1975), and Gerry Conway and Mike Vosburg's Return of the New Gods, which appeared in issue #13.

Issues #1 (featuring Atlas) featured art and story by Jack Kirby. A number of issues featured existing DC characters: issue #3, Metamorpho, issue #5, Manhunter (a new take on a pre-existing but dormant character), issue #7, the Creeper, issue #9, the Golden Age character Doctor Fate, and issue #13, the New Gods. The Metamorpho feature reunited the character's creators, writer Bob Haney and artist Ramona Fradon. Haney and Fradon had met at the 1974 San Diego Comic-Con, and while reminiscing, it emerged that both of them regarded Metamorpho as one of the features they had most enjoyed working on, leading them to ask DC if they could do one more Metamorpho story together. When asked in later years, 1st Issue Special staff have not been able to answer why the Creeper story was illustrated, but not written, by the character's creator, Steve Ditko.

Issue #12 featured a new Starman character which would later be used in James Robinson's 1990s series focused on the character Jack Knight. The character was a supporting player in Justice League: Cry for Justice in 2010.

Some stories which had been intended for publication in 1st Issue Special appeared in other titles instead. A Batgirl and Robin team-up was published in Batman Family #1 (September - October 1975) and a Green Arrow and Black Canary story was kept in inventory until it was published as a backup feature in Green Lantern #100 (January 1978).

1st Issue Special never included a letters column, instead accompanying each feature with a "Story Behind the Story" text page.

DC published a hard cover collection of the series in 2020.

Characters from 1st Issue Special star in the 12-issue 2022-2023 DC Black Label series Danger Street by Tom King and Jorge Fornes. Instead of devoting separate issues to each character or group, as in the original series, Danger Street incorporates all the different characters into overlapping narratives.

== List of stories and credits ==
Issue #	Date	Featured character and story title	Writer	Artists
1	April 1975	Atlas	Jack Kirby	Jack Kirby and D. Bruce Berry
2	May 1975	The Green Team: Boy Millionaires	Joe Simon	Jerry Grandenetti
3	June 1975	Metamorpho, The Element Man: "The Freak and the Billion-Dollar Phantom".	Bob Haney	Ramona Fradon
4	July 1975	Lady Cop: "Poisoned Love"	Robert Kanigher	John Rosenberger and Vince Colletta
5	August 1975	Manhunter	Jack Kirby	Jack Kirby and D. Bruce Berry
6	September 1975	Dingbats of Danger Street	Jack Kirby	Jack Kirby and Mike Royer
7	October 1975	The Creeper: "Menace of The Human Fire-Fly".	Michael Fleisher	Steve Ditko and Mike Royer
8	November 1975	The Warlord: "Land of Fear"	Mike Grell	
9	December 1975	Doctor Fate: "The Mummy That Time Forgot"	Martin Pasko	Walt Simonson
10	January 1976	The Outsiders: "Us...The Outsiders".	Joe Simon	Jerry Grandenetti and Creig Flessel
11	February 1976	Codename: Assassin	Gerry Conway and Steve Skeates	The Redondo Studio and Al Milgrom
12	March 1976	Starman	Gerry Conway	Mike Vosburg and Mike Royer
13	April 1976	Return of the New Gods: "Lest Night Fall Forever".	Gerry Conway and Denny O'Neil	Mike Vosburg

== Collected editions ==
- The Jack Kirby Omnibus Volume 2 includes the Atlas story from 1st Issue Special #1, the Manhunter story from #5, and the Dingbats of Danger Street story from #6, 624 pages, May 2013, ISBN 978-1401238339
- Showcase Presents: The Great Disaster featuring the Atomic Knights includes the Atlas story from 1st Issue Special #1, 576 pages, June 2014, ISBN 978-1401242909
- The Creeper by Steve Ditko includes the Creeper story from 1st Issue Special #7, 288 pages, April 2010, ISBN 978-1401225919
- The Warlord: The Savage Empire includes the Warlord story from 1st Issue Special #8, 240 pages, November 1991, ISBN 978-1563890246
- Showcase Presents: Warlord includes the Warlord story from 1st Issue Special #8, 528 pages, September 2009, ISBN 978-1401224738
- The Art of Walter Simonson includes the Doctor Fate story from 1st Issue Special #9, 208 pages, June 1989, ISBN 0930289412
- DC's 1st Issue Specials includes issues #1-13, 272 pages, March 2020, ISBN 978-1779501776

== See also ==
- List of DC Comics publications
