= OMAC (Buddy Blank) =

Fictional comic book character

- Cover of OMAC #6 (July–August 1975) with the original OMAC. Art by Jack Kirby and D. Bruce Berry.

Publication information
- Publisher: DC Comics
- First appearance: OMAC #1 (October 1974)
- Created by: Jack Kirby

In-story information
- Alter ego: Buddy Blank
- Team affiliations: Global Peace Agency
- Notable aliases: One-Man Army Corps
- Abilities: Superhuman strength, speed, durability and explosive energy generation provided by Brother Eye

OMAC (Buddy Blank) is a superhero appearing in American comic books published by DC Comics.

== Publication history ==
OMAC was created by writer-artist Jack Kirby towards the end of his contract with the publisher following the cancellation of his New Gods series; it was reportedly developed due to Kirby needing to fill his contractual quota of 15 pages a week. The character is inspired by Captain America, but lives in the future, an idea Kirby had conceived years earlier while at Marvel Comics but had never realized.

== Fictional character biography ==
Set in the near future ("The World That's Coming"), OMAC is a corporate nobody named Buddy Blank who is changed via a "computer-hormonal operation done by remote control" by an A.I. satellite called "Brother Eye" into the super-powered One-Man Army Corps (OMAC).

OMAC works for the Global Peace Agency (GPA), a group of faceless people who police the world using pacifistic weapons. The world balance is too dangerous for large armies, so OMAC is used as the main field enforcement agent for the GPA. The character initially uses his abilities to save a female coworker at the Pseudo-People factory (manufacturers of androids initially intended as companions but later developed as assassins). The coworker is revealed to be in actuality a bomb, and Blank is left in the employ of the GPA, sacrificing his identity in their relentless war, with faux parents his only consolation and companions.

The original OMAC series ended abruptly with its eighth issue (December 1975), leaving both the story arc and overall series lacking a conclusion, as Kirby had already departed DC for Marvel by the time of its publication. In Kamandi #50 (May 1977), by other creators, OMAC is revealed to be Kamandi's grandfather. An "OMAC" back-up feature by Jim Starlin began in issue #59 (October 1978), but Kamandi was cancelled after its first appearance. The story was later printed in Warlord, and led to a new OMAC back-up series in that title (#37–39, 42–47). OMAC appeared with Superman in DC Comics Presents #61.

In 1991 OMAC was featured in a four-issue prestige format limited series by writer/artist John Byrne that was independent of the previous series (it did resolve prior plot points, however, including a quick resolution to the cliffhanger from the first series). Byrne later reused OMAC in Superman & Batman: Generations 3, an Elseworlds limited series.

A contemporary incarnation of Buddy Blank appears in Countdown to Final Crisis. Following the release of the Morticoccus virus, Blank and his grandson flee to the scientific facility Command D, where Brother Eye rescues them and transforms Blank into a prototype OMAC.

== Powers and abilities ==
As OMAC, Buddy Blank possesses various abilities derived from Brother Eye. For example, an increase in his density grants superhuman strength and enhanced durability, and a decrease in his density allows flight and super-speed. Brother Eye could provide other abilities as well, such as self-repair functions and energy generation.

== OMACs ==
The modern OMAC; cover to The OMAC Project #5 (Oct. 2005), art by José Ladrönn.

The character and the Brother Eye satellite were reimagined for the Infinite Crisis storyline. OMACs are portrayed as humans whose bodies have been corrupted by a nano-virus. The acronym has multiple meanings throughout the series: "Observational Meta-human Activity Construct", "One-Man Army Corps", and "Omni Mind and Community".

== Other versions ==
- "Omegatech Mechanoid Armored Cop", a parody of OMAC, appears in the Tangent Comics comic The Joker's Wild.
- Two versions of Equus, amalgamated with OMAC, appear in "For Tomorrow".
- Alternate timeline variants of Superboy and Lex Luthor, amalgamated with OMAC, appear in DC One Million.
- A gender-flipped version of OMAC named OWAC (One-Woman Army Corps) appears in Kingdom Come.
- OMAC makes a non-speaking cameo appearance in JLA: Another Nail.
- Cartoonist Paul Pope reimagined the first issue of the original OMAC series for the anthology Solo.
- Basic OMAC units resembling the first OMAC appear in Final Crisis.
- bioMAC, an alternate universe variant of Ben Boxer amalgamated with OMAC, appears in The Multiversity.

== In other media ==
OMAC as he appears in Batman: The Brave and the Bold.

=== Television ===
A contemporary version of Buddy Blank / OMAC appears in Batman: The Brave and the Bold, voiced by Jeff Bennett.

=== Video games ===
Buddy Blank / OMAC appears as a character summon in Scribblenauts Unmasked: A DC Comics Adventure.

=== Merchandise ===
- OMAC received a figure in the Justice League Unlimited toyline.
- OMAC received a figure in wave 15 of Mattel's "DC Universe Classics" line.
- The modern OMAC received figures in Mattel's DC Universe and DC Direct toy lines.

== Collected editions ==
- Jack Kirby's O.M.A.C.: One Man Army Corps collects O.M.A.C.: One Man Army Corps #1–8, 200 pages, May 2008, ISBN 1-4012-1790-7

== See also ==
- Jack Kirby bibliography
