= Dingbats of Danger Street =

Fictional comic book gang of kids published by DC Comics

- The Dingbats of Danger Street from 1st Issue Special #6, art by Jack Kirby and Mike Royer.

Publication information
- Publisher: DC Comics
- First appearance: 1st Issue Special #6 (September 1975)
- Created by: Jack Kirby

In-story information
- Member(s): Good Looks; Krunch; Non-Fat; Bananas

The Dingbats of Danger Street are a fictional comic book gang of kids published by DC Comics. The Dingbats debuted in 1st Issue Special #6 (September 1975) and were created by Jack Kirby.

== Publication history ==
According to inker Mike Royer, The Dingbats of Danger Street was developed as a new series, but the series was cancelled and the first issue repurposed as an issue of 1st Issue Special. In this issue, the Dingbats (at least partly by accident) stop the villains Jumpin' Jack and the Gasser with the help of Lieutenant Terry Mullins. Two additional stories that would have been The Dingbats of Danger Street #2 and #3 were written and drawn by Kirby, but remained unpublished until 2019, when they were included in the compilation book Dingbat Love

The Dingbats reappear in The Adventures of Superman, one of a number of Kirby homages by Karl Kesel. They first appear in brief cameos, but are subsequently seen in full in The Adventures of Superman #549, in which they compete with the Newsboy Legion and the Green Team for a disused theatre. Kesel explained that he was a fan of the Newsboy Legion, and brought in the other two boy groups as a counterpoint to the Newsboys, since all three were created by Joe Simon and/or Jack Kirby. He added, "As much as I love Kirby's work overall, I can't say I have any special fondness for the Dingbats - they served their story purpose as a counterpoint to the Newsboys, but it wasn't like I was hoping we'd get a Dingbats mini out of their appearance."

The group makes a cameo in the final issue of Batman: The Brave and the Bold as Bat-Mite is upset at the comic's cancellation and expresses disappointment at missed potential team-ups, such as the Dingbats.

One of the Dingbats, Krunch, appeared as a member of the new Challengers of the Unknown in the 2018 miniseries written by Scott Snyder.

In 2022, Danger Street, a new 12-issue series written by Tom King and art by Jorge Fornés, was launched. It takes a darker tone as a plan to join the Justice League by Starman, Metamorpho, and Warlord goes awry, dragging the Dingbats into trouble.

== Membership ==
- Good Looks - an average looking kid, the group's leader.
- Krunch - a large red headed boy whose eyes were always hidden by his long hair; the muscle.
- Non-Fat - a skinny boy in a wool hat with a hot dog. Mike Royer has confirmed that, as his facial features and a few lines of dialogue suggest, Non-Fat was meant to be African-American but was mis-colored as a Caucasian.
- Bananas - a boy who was considered to be crazy. The visual model for Bananas was a caricatured Mike Royer.
