= DC Graphic Novel =

1980s DC Comics graphic novel line

- Cover of DC Graphic Novel #1 featuring the Star Raiders (1983), art by Stephen Hickman.

Publication information
- Publisher: DC Comics
- Format: Anthology
- Genre: Science fiction Superhero
- Publication date: List: DC Graphic Novel: 1983–1986 DC Science Fiction Graphic Novel: 1985–1987
- No. of issues: List: DC Graphic Novel: 7 DC Science Fiction Graphic Novel: 7
- Main character: List: Star Raiders Warlords The Hunger Dogs

Creative team
- Written by: List: DC Graphic Novel Ernie Colón Arthur Byron Cover Jack Kirby Elliot S! Maggin Pat Mills Greg Potter Steve Skeates DC Science Fiction Graphic Novel Cary Bates Robert Bloch Ray Bradbury Harlan Ellison Robert Loren Fleming Klaus Janson Paul Kupperberg George R. R. Martin Neal McPheeters Doug Moench Larry Niven Victoria Petersen Frederik Pohl Robert Silverberg
- Artist: List: DC Graphic Novel Ernie Colón José Luis García-López Alex Niño Kevin O'Neill Ron Randall David Wenzel DC Science Fiction Graphic Novel Jan Duursema Klaus Janson Neal McPheeters Marshall Rogers
- Penciller: List: DC Graphic Novel Jack Kirby DC Science Fiction Graphic Novel Pat Broderick Gene Colan Keith Giffen
- Inker: List: DC Graphic Novel D. Bruce Berry Mike Royer Greg Theakston DC Science Fiction Graphic Novel Neal McPheeters Greg Theakston Bill Wray
- Editor: List: DC Graphic Novel Ernie Colón Andy Helfer Dave Manak Joe Orlando Janice Race Julius Schwartz DC Science Fiction Graphic Novel Julius Schwartz

DC Graphic Novel is a line of graphic novel trade paperbacks published from 1983 to 1986 by DC Comics.

The series generally featured stand-alone stories featuring new characters and concepts with one notable exception. The Hunger Dogs was intended by Jack Kirby and DC to serve as the end to the entire Fourth World saga. The project was mired in controversy over Kirby's insistence that the series should end with the deaths of the New Gods, which clashed with DC's demands that the characters could not be killed off.

As a result, production of the graphic novel suffered many delays and revisions. Pages and storyline elements from the unpublished "On the Road to Armagetto" were revised and incorporated into the graphic novel. Then, DC ordered the entire plot restructured which resulted in many pages of the story being rearranged out of Kirby's intended reading order.

From 1985 to 1987, DC also published a second, related line called DC Science Fiction Graphic Novel. Rather than being original stories, the graphic novels of this line were instead adaptations of works published by well-known authors of science fiction. These were edited by Julius Schwartz, making use of his connections to recruit the famous authors whose works were adapted. This was the last editorial work Schwartz did before retiring.

These two series were DC's counterparts to Marvel Comics' Marvel Graphic Novel line.

== DC Graphic Novel series ==
Number	Title	Year	Writers	Artists	Editor	Notes
1	Star Raiders	1983	Elliot S! Maggin	José Luis García-López	Andy Helfer	Based on the video game Star Raiders. Cover art by Stephen Hickman.
2	Warlords	1983	Steve Skeates	David Wenzel	Dave Manak	Based on the video game Warlords. Cover art by Thomas Blackshear
3	The Medusa Chain	1984	Ernie Colón			
4	The Hunger Dogs	1985	Jack Kirby	Jack Kirby, Greg Theakston, D. Bruce Berry, Mike Royer	Joe Orlando	Finale to Jack Kirby's Fourth World. First appearance of Bekka.
5	Me and Joe Priest	1985	Greg Potter	Ron Randall	Janice Race	Cover art by Howard Chaykin
6	Metalzoic	1986	Pat Mills	Kevin O'Neill	Andy Helfer	Published almost simultaneously with the serialization in 2000 AD. Cover art by Bill Sienkiewicz.
7	Space Clusters	1986	Arthur Byron Cover	Alex Niño	Julius Schwartz	

== DC Science Fiction Graphic Novel series ==
Number	Title	Year	Writers	Artists	Editor	Notes
1	Hell On Earth	1985	Robert Bloch, Robert Loren Fleming	Keith Giffen, Greg Theakston, Bill Wray	Julius Schwartz	Adapts a horror story that was originally published in the pulp magazine Weird Tales in May 1942. Cover art by Bill Sienkiewicz.
2	Nightwings	1985	Robert Silverberg, Cary Bates	Gene Colan, Neal McPheeters	Julius Schwartz	Cover art by Bill Sienkiewicz.
3	Frost and Fire	1985	Ray Bradbury, Klaus Janson	Klaus Janson	Julius Schwartz	Cover art by Bill Sienkiewicz.
4	The Merchants of Venus	1986	Frederik Pohl, Victoria Petersen, Neal McPheeters	Neal McPheeters	Julius Schwartz	
5	Demon with a Glass Hand	1985	Harlan Ellison	Marshall Rogers	Julius Schwartz	Also adapted as the October 17, 1964 episode of The Outer Limits.
6	The Magic Goes Away	1986	Larry Niven, Paul Kupperberg	Jan Duursema	Julius Schwartz	
7	Sandkings	1987	George R. R. Martin, Doug Moench	Pat Broderick, Neal McPheeters	Julius Schwartz	Also adapted as the March 26, 1995 episode of The Outer Limits.

== Collected editions ==
- Jack Kirby's Fourth World Omnibus Volume 4 (collects DC Graphic Novel #4: "The Hunger Dogs", with some alterations to the art, 424 pages, March 2008, ISBN 1-4012-1583-1)
