= Atlas (DC Comics) =

DC Comics characters

- Atlas as seen on the cover of 1st Issue Special (April 1975).

Publication information
- Publisher: DC Comics
- First appearance: 1st Issue Special #1 (April 1975)
- Created by: Jack Kirby

In-story information
- Alter ego: Atlas
- Species: Human (empowered)
- Team affiliations: Justice League
- Abilities: Superhuman strength and invulnerability

Atlas is the name of several characters appearing in American comic books published by DC Comics. The first Atlas is a superhero and antihero who debuted in 1st Issue Special #1 (April 1975) and was created by Jack Kirby.

== Publication history ==
The first Golden Age version of a character named Atlas in DC Comics appeared in Action Comics #121 (June 1948). The second appearance of an Atlas was in Action Comics #320 (January 1965). The third was in Action Comics #353 (August 1967).

The Jack Kirby Atlas' first and only appearance prior to Superman #677 was in 1st Issue Special #1. James Robinson brought Atlas back in Superman #678. According to Robinson, "Atlas is going to have humanity. The way I like to look at him is like in the Marvel Universe, Namor is a hero but he really skates the fine line between being a hero and a villain, but he stays on the side of the hero. Atlas, skates that line between hero and villain but he ultimately always falls on the villain side."

One of the earlier characters named Atlas re-appeared in Grant Morrison's All-Star Superman, where a version of Atlas appears in issue #3. This Atlas is more closely based on the mythological figure of Atlas and competes with Superman and Samson to "win" Lois Lane, similar to the story in Action Comics #320 from January 1965.

== Fictional character biography ==
=== Titan version ===
The first Atlas is based on the Greek mythological figure, a Titan who was forced to support the Earth as punishment for his participation in the Titanomachy. When Wonder Woman is on Mount Olympus with Hermes during the "War of the Gods" storyline, Hercules helps to protect Themyscira. Atlas is now carrying Themyscira on his shoulders, but struggles to do so, causing earthquakes throughout Themyscira. Atlas is also one of the deities who empower Captain Marvel, providing him with superhuman stamina.

=== Atlas (second version) ===
Atlas' family and people were killed by the raiders of Hyssa the Lizard King. Atlas was raised by a wise and mysterious traveller named Chagra. Because of an alien crystal carried by Atlas, Chagra theorized that Atlas was one of the people of the Crystal Mountain. Chagra agrees to help Atlas achieve his revenge, but only if Atlas leads him to the Crystal Mountain. Atlas grows up to become a protector of the innocent, but once Hyssa was defeated, his petulance and darker nature come to the forefront.

Atlas returns in Superman #677 as part of The Coming of Atlas storyline. He is working with a secret government project that intends to kill Superman. Atlas wants to defeat Superman and replace him as Metropolis' champion on his way to conquer the modern world. He fights the Science Police and Superman. Atlas holds the upper hand on Superman for most of the battle, but is defeated after Superman is magically enhanced by Zachary Zatara. Atlas' return and fight with Superman were intended to test Project 7734, a government project that utilizes magic in an effort to kill Superman.

Atlas is later kidnapped and brainwashed by an unknown party and forced to fight the Justice League.

=== A.T.L.A.S. ===
A new incarnation of Atlas inspired by the Teen Titans version, whose name is an acronym for Automated Titanium Lethal Attack Sentry, appears in the "Dawn of DC" Cyborg miniseries.

== Powers and abilities ==
The first Atlas possesses superhuman strength and invulnerability.

== Other versions ==
- An alternate universe version of Atlas appears in Kingdom Come.
- An alternate universe version of Atlas appears in All-Star Superman.

== In other media ==
- Atlas appears in Teen Titans, voiced by Keith David. This version is a robot and member of the Brotherhood of Evil.
- Atlas appears in All-Star Superman, voiced by Steve Blum.
- Atlas appears as a character summon in Scribblenauts Unmasked: A DC Comics Adventure.
- The Teen Titans incarnation of Atlas appears in Teen Titans Go!.

== See also ==
- List of Superman enemies
