= Last Days of the Justice Society of America =

Publication information
- Publisher: DC Comics
- Format: One-shot
- Genre: Superhero
- Publication date: 1986
- No. of issues: 1
- Main character: Justice Society of America

Creative team
- Written by: Roy Thomas; Dann Thomas
- Penciller: David Ross
- Inker: Mike Gustovich
- Letterer: David Cody Weiss
- Colorist: Carl Gafford
- Editor: Roy Thomas

Collected editions
- Last Days of the Justice Society of America: ISBN 978-1-4012-6733-9

Last Days of the Justice Society of America, a.k.a. simply Last Days of the Justice Society, is a one-shot comic book special from DC Comics, originally produced in 1986. A sequel to the maxi-series Crisis on Infinite Earths, the book's purpose was to remove the Justice Society of America from the DC universe, because the writers felt that the team of aging heroes had become irrelevant in the post-Crisis world. However, it was done in such a way that the JSA could be brought back in the future if writers wanted to.

== Main characters ==
The following heroes take part in the main action of the book:

- Atom (Al Pratt)
- Doctor Fate (Kent Nelson)
- Doctor Mid-Nite (Charles McNider)
- Flash (Jay Garrick)
- Green Lantern (Alan Scott)
- Hawkgirl (Shiera Sanders Hall)
- Hawkman (Carter Hall)
- Hourman (Rex Tyler)
- Power Girl (Kara Zor-L)
- Sandman (Wesley Dodds)
- Sandy the Golden Boy
- Spectre (Jim Corrigan)
- Star-Spangled Kid (Sylvester Pemberton)
- Starman (Ted Knight)
- Johnny Thunder and Thunderbolt
- Wildcat (Ted Grant)

The following heroes only appear in the 1945 flashback:

- Batman (Earth-Two)
- Mister Terrific (Terry Sloane)
- Superman (Earth-Two)
- Wonder Woman (Earth-Two)

The following members of Infinity, Inc. make two cameo appearances:

- Brainwave Jr.
- Fury (Hippolyta Trevor)
- Jade
- Northwind
- Nuklon (Albert Rothstein)
- Obsidian
- Silver Scarab

The principal villain of the story is Adolf Hitler, as he was depicted in All-Star Squadron.

== Plot ==
Fifteen members and associates of the Justice Society—Hawkman, Hawkgirl, Flash, Green Lantern, Sandman, Sandy, Starman, Dr. Mid-Nite, Dr. Fate, Atom, Johnny Thunder, Hourman, Wildcat, Power Girl, and Star-Spangled Kid—are gathered for a private memorial service for the Robin and Huntress of Earth-Two, who had recently been killed in the Crisis. Feeling redundant in a world filled with younger heroes, the JSA is about to officially disband, when suddenly The Spectre appears to them, apparently fatally wounded despite being a ghost. In an instant of psychic communion, he puts a message into Dr. Fate's head, and then dissipates. Dr. Fate then psychically shares this information with all the others, and elaborates as he casts a spell to transport them all through time and space to Berlin on April 15, 1945.

The message was that, while The Spectre was lying unconscious in the cosmic void in the aftermath of the Crisis, his unchecked energy had reached out in space and time, making contact with the Spear of Destiny in 1945 while Adolf Hitler was trying to use it to bring about the end of the world. The Spectre's power, added to that of the Spear, enabled it to bring about Hitler's "Twilight of the Gods", destroying the Earth and the universe, and fatally wounding The Spectre in the process. He'd managed to reach the modern-day JSA and warn them of this disaster just before the altered past caught up with the present.

The heroes arrive at their destination just in time to see Hitler start his spell, opening a whirling hole in the sky. The JSA fly up through the hole and find themselves in the realm of Asgard, home of the Norse/Teutonic Gods, who are about to fight their final battle (i.e., Ragnarök). To prevent the Norse Gods from losing, and thus prevent the destruction of the Earth, Dr. Fate uses his magic to physically merge the other heroes with the Gods, adding to their might and willpower. Many of the heroes/Gods are killed in the battle, but the remaining ones fight on, determined to change its predetermined outcome.

During the battle, days pass on Earth; Hitler's spell fails, Germany is defeated by the Allies, and Hitler and Eva Braun commit suicide.

The heroes defeat almost all of the enemy, but they still have to beat Surtur, the fire-giant who's determined to burn away all life on the battlefield (and also the Earth). Due to the non-linear nature of time in the Asgardian realm, Dr. Fate is able to bring the slain heroes back to life, and together they fight and kill Surtur. However, because Ragnarök is a never-ending battle, the battle starts all over again, and the heroes must re-fight it forever to prevent the end of the world. Dr. Fate sends Power Girl and the Star-Spangled Kid back home against their will, saying the young must sometimes be spared the fate of the old; Fate then prepares to enter the eternal battle alongside his comrades, when The Spectre—apparently fully healed—stops him, saying that Fate's magic is needed to eternally sustain the other heroes. Against his will, Fate is sent back home by The Spectre, who says that he himself has been called home by his Master.

Dr. Fate finds himself back at the site of the memorial service along with Power Girl and Star-Spangled Kid. Seven members of Infinity, Inc. are also present, having shown up late for the service, and Fate psychically shows them everything that has happened. They walk away, along with Power Girl and the Star-Spangled Kid, to grieve for the loss of their families and allies, leaving only Dr. Fate behind. Lying at his feet are chessmen shaped like the eternally-battling heroes.

== Notes ==
- In the story, Hitler's Ragnarök spell took place on the day of Franklin D. Roosevelt's funeral, at which the then-current roster of the JSA (including Superman, Batman, Wonder Woman, and Mr. Terrific) served as an honor guard. According to DC Special #29 (August–September 1977), Roosevelt played a major part in the original formation of the JSA.
- In The Sandman #26 (May 1991), which is collected in The Sandman: Season of Mists, it was revealed that the realm in which the heroes were trapped was actually a simulation created by Odin as a way to thwart the actual Ragnarök.
- In 1992, the miniseries Armageddon: Inferno brought the heroes out of Ragnarök with other superheroes, such as the Justice League of America, rescuing them while another group called Daemons took their place and they were put back into the DC universe; this led directly into the 1992 Justice Society of America series.

== Trade paperback ==
In 2017, DC released the trade paperback Last Days of the Justice Society of America, which includes the original one-shot comic as well as origin stories reprinted from the following issues of the 1986 run of Secret Origins:

- Issue #7 (Sandman)
- Issue #9 (Star-Spangled Kid, Flash)
- Issue #11 (Hawkman)
- Issue #13 (Johnny Thunder)
- Issue #15 (Spectre)
- Issue #16 (Hourman)
- Issue #18 (Green Lantern)
- Issue #20 (Dr. Mid-Nite)
- Issue #24 (Dr. Fate)
- Issue #25 (Atom)
- Issue #31 (Justice Society of America)
