= Sandman (comics) =

Sandman or The Sandman, in comics, may refer to a number of characters:

- Sandman (DC Comics), denoting the various characters that have taken the mantle of the Sandman, including:
  - The Sandman (comic book), a comic book series written by Neil Gaiman and centers on the protagonist, Dream/Morpheus, the immortal anthropomorphic personification of dreams
  - Sandman (Wesley Dodds), a comic character from the 1930s who has made more recent appearances in:
    - Sandman Mystery Theatre
    - Sandman Midnight Theatre, in which Dodds meets Dream
  - Just Imagine... Sandman, Stan Lee and Walt Simonson’s version of Sandman
  - Sandy Hawkins, the current DC Sandman
  - Sandman (DC Comics) #Garrett Sanford, a comic book series from the 1970s, created by Joe Simon and Jack Kirby.
  - The Sandman Saga (Superman), a Superman story arc published in 1971.
- Sandman (Marvel Comics), a supervillain who can transform his body into sand, and is an enemy of Spider-Man
- Sandmann (comic book), a 2019 comic book by Michael Mikolajczak and Jacek Piotrowski

== See also ==
- Sandman (disambiguation)
