= The New Golden Age =

2022 comic book storyline

- Publisher: DC Comics
- Publication date: November 2022 – October 2024
- Genre: Superhero
Title(s)
The New Golden Age #1, Stargirl: The Lost Children #1–6, Justice Society of America (vol. 4) #1–12
- Main character(s): Justice Society of America; Huntress (Helena Wayne); Stargirl; Red Arrow; Green Lantern (Alan Scott); Flash (Jay Garrick); Sandman (Wesley Dodds); Legion of Super-Heroes

Creative team
- Writer: Geoff Johns
- Artist: Various

"The New Golden Age" is a crossover event in DC Comics publications. Written by Geoff Johns, the story follows the Justice Society of America unraveling a mystery following the Golden Age heroes and villains and the untold stories that come with it. The story comprises an eponymous one-shot and the central storyline in the ongoing Justice Society of America, as well as tie-in limited series like Stargirl: The Lost Children, Alan Scott: The Green Lantern, Jay Garrick: The Flash, and Wesley Dodds: The Sandman.

The event received highly positive reviews from critics.

== Publication history ==
In August 2022, DC Comics announced "The New Golden Age", an event meant to reintroduce readers to the Justice Society of America and other Golden Age characters, as well as explore the past, present and future of the DC multiverse.

The New Golden Age was expanded to three new six-issue miniseries: Alan Scott: The Green Lantern by Tim Sheridan and Cian Tormey, Jay Garrick: The Flash by Jeremy Adams and Diego Olortegui, and Wesley Dodds: The Sandman by Robert Venditti and Riley Rossmo. The crossover event is also part of the "Dawn of DC" initiative.

== Plot ==
=== Prelude ===
In Star City, Green Arrow and Red Arrow are approached by Crimson Avenger (Jill Carlyle), who states to Green Arrow that Lee Travis needs his help. Carlyle informs Stargirl that Wing, Travis' sidekick, previously sacrificed himself to help return Green Arrow and Speedy to the present. Stargirl and Red Arrow follow the Seven Soldiers of Victory to the shipwreck that Crimson Avenger died on and learn that Crimson Avenger survived because of Clock King using Per Degaton's time machine. While working to deactivate the time machine, Stargirl inadvertently touches Travis and has a vision of Wing. A voice states to Stargirl that the Childminder is coming and that the lost sons and daughters need to be free. Crimson Avenger tells Stargirl to save Wing and to destroy Degaton's time machine before it swallows everything. Stargirl evacuates Carlyle before the time machine implodes, killing Travis. In the 1940s, Clock King is confronted by Degaton, who plans to use him in his plots.

Meanwhile, Rip Hunter is informed that the Time Masters' capsules containing missing Golden Age superheroes (Mister Miracle, Aquaman, Legionnaire, Betsy Ross, Molly Pitcher, Ladybug, Quiz Kid, Salem the Witch Girl, Cherry Bomb, Harlequin's Son, John Henry Jr., Judy Garrick, and Red Lantern) have shut down, returning their captives to their own time.

=== Main plot ===
==== The New Golden Age ====
Ten years from now on November 22, Helena Wayne is playing with her friends at Gotham Elementary School. She states that she has seen a mysterious person who she calls "The Stranger". On November 22, 3022, the ruins of the JSA's headquarters are found by the descendants of Green Lantern, Doctor Fate, and Atom as they are ambushed by the Stranger, who kills Fate. In the present, Kent Nelson's grand-nephew Khalid Nassour meets with Detective Chimp, who tells him what he knows about the Helmet of Fate and that Deadman may help them exorcise Nabu from the Helmet of Fate. When Khalid puts on the Helmet of Fate, he has a vision of Green Lantern and Atom battling the Stranger in 3022. In 1848, Corky Baxter is confronted by his fellow Time Masters after attempting to prevent the assassination of Abraham Lincoln. 13 years prior to Helena's future, her father Bruce Wayne was killed, causing her to become Huntress to avenge his death.

==== Justice Society of America ====
While searching for Khalid Nassour, Huntress forms a new incarnation of the Justice Society consisting of Power Girl, Solomon Grundy, Gentleman Ghost, Harlequin's Son, Icicle, Mist, and Red Lantern. Two days later, the JSA find Doctor Fate's mummified body. The Strange attacks and shoots Power Girl with a kryptonite bullet. He proceeds to use his time-based abilities to kill Gentleman Ghost, rot Grundy's body, shatter Icicle's body, overload Red Lantern, and age Mist to death. With Huntress left alive, she tries to attack as the Stranger ages her. Catwoman then arrives and buys Huntress time to save the JSA from before an earlier year. Huntress is sent to the year 1940, where she is found by Johnny Thunder and Thunderbolt.

Huntress awakens in a medical lab in November 1940 and meets the Justice Society members Flash, Hawkman, Atom, Doctor Fate, Green Lantern, Sandman, Spectre, Johnny Thunder, and Thunderbolt. Huntress introduces herself and states that she is from the future. In the future, Catwoman identifies the Stranger as Per Degaton. Huntress is suddenly returned to the present, where she encounters Doctor Fate, Detective Chimp, and Deadman.

Madame Xanadu informs the Society that Per Degaton made a deal with the Lords of Chaos and intends to kill the original Justice Society. However, Fate summons alternate universe versions of the Society to stop Degaton. Fate travels to the 31st century to assist the Legion of Substitute Heroes. After they persuade Solomon Grundy, Red Lantern, Icicle, and Harlequin's Son to join up with them, the Society recruits Legionnaire, a young heroic version of Mordru. However, the Legion of Super-Heroes arrive to stop them, believing that Mordru will inevitably turn evil. During the fight, Eclipso bursts out of Wildcat. With help from Legionnaire, Huntress fires an enchanted arrow at Eclipso's black diamond. As Wildcat is restored to life and Legionnaire has Eclipso's black diamond locked away on Gemworld, the Legion of Super-Heroes hooks Legionnaire and Huntress up with the JSA of their time period.

In the present, Courtney Whitmore graduates while reflecting on her past.

=== Subplots ===
==== Stargirl: The Lost Children ====
On April 13, 1942, two criminals named the Fox and the Crow have committed a robbery as they are being pursued by TNT and Dan the Dyna-Mite, who defeat them. In the present, Courtney is visited by Red Arrow, who has a lead on Wing's whereabouts. Both of them then hear some message meant for Dan on the radio until an explosion happens, with a voice telling them to find them. Meanwhile, Dan lands on an island and is mysteriously de-aged as a voice states that he should not have come here.

Stargirl and Red Arrow trace Dan's last known research to an island in the Diablo Triangle. During the voyage, Stargirl has a vision from Air Wave stating that they are too close and that he is trapped with the children as the boat is attacked. After Red Arrow rescues Stargirl and swims to the surface, they see an island nearby. Stargirl and Red Arrow are attacked by egg-shaped robots called Child Collectors, who manage to capture Red Arrow. Stargirl is saved by Air Wave, Cherry Bomb, Wing, and Robotman's robotic dog Robbie. Wing states that they are on Orphan Island and that they can escape as Robbie states that the only way off the island is death.

Wing introduces Stargirl to the Lost Children consisting of Little Miss Redhead and her companions the Blue Boys, the Newsboy Legion (who were sidekicks to Guardian), Tick-Tock of Hourman's Minute Men of America, John Henry Jr., Betsy Ross, Molly Pitcher, Ladybug, Salem the Witch Girl, and Quiz Kid. At the Childminder's castle, Red Arrow meets Boom, who has been imprisoned next to her.

Corky states that the missing sidekicks disappeared from history following the creation of the Flashpoint reality. The Time Masters rescued them from Limbo to keep them from being erased, intending to keep hold of them until the timeline was fully restored. Due to the attack on the timestream, Childminder pulled the children to Orphan Island. When asked by Salem the Witch Girl on how long they were here, Corky states that time stands still on Orphan Island. Stargirl then asks who Childminder is going to sell the children to, though Corky evades the question. Childminder greets the buyer, who is revealed to be the Hourman android.

Stargirl and Red Arrow attack Childminder's castle and free the sidekicks. However, Childminder and Hourman arrive with the Child Collectors to recapture them. As Stargirl confronts Hourman, he notes that his master is coming - an older version of Corky Baxter named Time Master. He claims to Stargirl and Quiz Kid that history is currently stable with the Lost Children outside of time. Boom removes Hourman's brain so that Quiz Kid and Robbie can reprogram him and return him to his normal behavior. As Childminder rants about wanting to be young again, a beam from the time portal reduces Childminder to an egg. With Hourman reprogrammed, he helps Stargirl and the Lost Children fight Time Master as he blasts him into the time portal. Corky states that Wing is needed to stop Nebula Man. Despite Stargirl's objection, Wing persuades her to return him to the past, allowing him to die. Hourman states that the Lost Children cannot be returned to their own time, as doing so would create a time paradox. Instead, the Lost Children are brought to the present day. Meanwhile, Corky is visited by Rip Hunter, who tells him that the Time Master no longer exists.

==== Wesley Dodds: The Sandman ====
In the summer of 1940, Sandman attacks corrupt official/crime boss Robert Rossi, who is responsible for several deaths. Sandman narrates how his prophetic dreams have led him to Rossi and Tarantula. However, he has not been able to decipher some of the dreams, including one about figures in elaborate dress fighting an adversary dressed in black (later revealed to be the Justice Society of America fighting Per Degaton). Sandman then recalls his first nightmare involving his father fighting in World War I, where he was traumatized by the bodies of soldiers blistered by chemical concoctions. After speaking with Dian Belmont, Wesley meets with his father's old friend Wheeler Vanderlyle and Colonel Malcolm Breckinridge. Wesley and Breckinridge talk about a sedative gas and how it can be used on enemy soldiers in non-lethal ways. With the proposal for the gas failing, Wesley is invited to Vanderlyle's reception. During the reception, Wesley is at the table with Dian and her father Lawrence Belmont as he meets Rex Tyler. Outside, Wesley tells Dian about how his proposal to Breckinridge fell through. Dian tells him that there will be other colonels he can propose to. As Wesley grabs his stuff from Leslie Humphries' car, he changes into Sandman and saves a man from being mugged. The thugs flee on a passing fire truck. Wesley hitches a ride on the fire truck and arrives at his house, which been set on fire in his absence.

The next day, Wesley speaks with a fire chief, who speculates that the fire was caused by a burglary gone wrong. Wesley learns that his research into gas has been stolen along with his gas mask and gas guns. As Wesley rests, he has a dream about the culprit posing as him to use the deadly gases. After waking up, Wesley sneaks into the police headquarters to access the records and slips out before a police officer can catch him. Upon developing his photos, Wesley finds that his search has led him to Igor Kluge, who is known for burglary and safecracking. Meanwhile, the culprit dons a copy of the Sandman attire and prepares to pose as Sandman.

Later that night, Sandman searches the ruins of Dodds Mansion for clues. He is attacked by a mysterious figure dressed in a black version of his Sandman outfit as Sandman tries to obtain the figure's identity from him. Sandman manages to disarm the figure, who he nicknames Fog. When Fog removes Sandman's mask, he tries to use one of the toxins on him, only for Wesley to end up setting it off. As Fog runs off, Wesley holds his breath as long as he can until he collapses.

After recovering, Wesley battles Fog, assuming that he gave his research to Colonel Malcolm Breckinridge. After using a knife on Wesley, Fog continues his attack and is accidentally knocked out the window, seemingly dying. As Wesley helps Wheeler to his feet, Dian comes in and learns about the attack and that Fog was the lead on where his journal is.

Sandman interrogates Breckinridge on why he sent people to steal Wesley Dodds' research, his use of Igor Kluge, and where the journal containing his research is. While admitting that Kluge was a poor soldier, Breckinridge states that Wesley's journal is with someone who will make a lot of damage with it. Wesley leaves Breckinridge and his recorded confession for the police to pick up. Meanwhile, Leslie Humphries finds Wesley's journal, but is knocked out by Vanderlyle wielding a candlestick.

When Wesley arrives to confront Vanderlyle, Vanderlyle grabs a revolver, preparing to shoot Wesley. As Vanderlyle prepares to fire his revolver, he is instead shot by Dian Belmont who prepares to tend to Wesley's injuries. Six months later, Wesley's house has been rebuilt as Dian visits him and Humphries. Dian then introduces Wesley to her nephew Sandy Hawkins. Wesley is greeted by Hawkman, Green Lantern, Flash, Doctor Fate, Spectre, Hourman, and Thunderbolt, who invite him into the Justice Society of America.

==== Jay Garrick: The Flash ====
In 1963, Jay Garrick recalls when he and his daughter Judy, also known as Boom, rescued Joan Garrick from a kidnapper. In the present, Jay and Joan have lost their memories of Judy. Joan's memory is jogged when she is reunited with Boom and taken to her room, where Bart Allen had been bunking. Later, Jay's memory is jogged when Judy reminds him that they were fighting Doctor Elemental when she disappeared. In a flashback to 1963, Boom saves Joan from Doctor Elemental before he can change Joan on an elemental level. With his mask damaged, Boom recognizes Elemental before he disappears, stating that they will see each other again someday. After saving Joan, Boom starts to disappear. When Flash catches up to Joan, he learns that she has no memory of Boom.

In a flashback to 1941, Atom, Doctor Fate, Green Lantern, and Hawkman are battling a group of sentient robots in Wutch Gorge. They then encounter a cyborg bear named Ro-Bear. Flash subdues Ro-Bear, who teleports away. In the present, Judy Garrick's powers are being studied at S.T.A.R. Labs' Detroit branch. Sarah Charles finds no traces of tachyon displacement or cell degeneration in Judy. Courtney Whitmore and Judy go to the Keystone City Mall, only for Ro-Bear to attack. Despite being mad at her father, Judy assists him in defeating Ro-Bear as Jay remembers him.

After Boom states that she has Doctor Elemental unmasked, Mister Terrific states that he can work on an invention to help her. They enter Mister Terrific's lab, where Quiz Kid and Mister Terrific's son Fairplay are playing chess. When Mister Terrific asks about the status of the Memory Imager, Fairplay states that it is ready for use. As it is used on Boom to access the memory of when she saw Doctor Elemental unmasked, Flash identifies the man as Professor Hughes, who he claims is the one responsible for him gaining his super-speed.

Arriving at Detroit's S.T.A.R. Labs branch, Flash and Boom enter the office of Garrison Slate. Upon entering, Slate gives them Professor Hughes' diary. In 1938, Hughes saw on TV the news report detailing the heroic actions of Green Lantern. Three years later, Hughes puts his plans for a human test subject to work by having Jay separate the gases from the hard water he studied in order to prepare for a new experiment. Using the observation lab that he set up next door, Hughes sees him smoking a cigarette and hits a button in his laboratory to trigger an accident. This led to hard water vapors covering Jay as he collapses. Three days later, Jay recovers in the hospital as Hughes learns that Jay has gained superhuman speed. Hughes worked on replicating the experiment, but every attempt failed. Hughes eventually set up a lab in Wutach Gorge, where he created Ro-Bear, advanced vehicles, and technology that enables him to control the classical elements.

Hughes, now known as Doctor Elemental, kidnaps Judy from Pieter Cross's property and has her tied up. He activates a device that absorbs energy from S.T.A.R. Labs establishments around the world. As the meter reaches 100%, Doctor Elemental uses his wind attack to activate his device so that he can awaken every metagene in the world with Boom serving as a battery. Flash destroys the devices at the S.T.A.R. Labs branches before attacking Doctor Elemental's facility, where he frees Boom. Doctor Elemental escapes and is approached by a mysterious person, who has a proposition for him.

==== Alan Scott: The Green Lantern ====
At FBI headquarters, Alan Scott is reading a bulletin of his latest heroics as he speaks with J. Edgar Hoover. Hoover intends to make Alan work with the JSA in exchange for his homosexuality being kept secret. In 1941, Alan as Green Lantern shows up at the bank as a police lieutenant tells him about a gunman and a woman sights a red fireball approaching. He manages to stop the red fireball. In 1935, Alan and his lover Johnny Ladd are attacked by a tentacled menace that drags Johnny underwater. This incident led to Alan supposedly going mad and ending up in Arkham Asylum.

Flashbacks reveal that Johnny Ladd is actually a Russian man named Vladimir Sokov. Vladimir grew up in the Soviet Union in the 1920s and left home at a young age to get away from his father. Years later, Vladimir learned about the Crimson Flame of Death and was told to infiltrate the United States Army to retrieve the weapon by any means necessary. Vladimir took on the alias of Johnny Ladd and joined the U.S. Army in locating the Crimson Flame, during which he met Alan Scott. After Vladimir was pulled overboard by the Crimson Flame, Red Labs found his body and Vladimir spent two years having the Crimson Flame's fragments removed from him for study. Eventually, Vladimir was presented with a red lantern that housed the Crimson Flame and its associated ring and became Red Lantern.

While battling Red Lantern, Alan Scott is sent to the center of the Starheart, the source of his powers. The Emerald Flame explains how the Guardians of the Universe worked to trap its energy and how the Crimson Flame was born. The Emerald Flame states that it is fueled by willpower, while the Crimson Flame is fueled by rage. After he leaves the Starheart, Alan and Red Lantern are attacked by a group of people claiming that Red Lantern has been relieved of his duty. They are introduced as Comrade Kostra, the Countess, Professor Molotok, Proletari-ant, and their leader Major Blaze, who make up the Crimson Host and were conceived in Red Lantern's image as his replacements.

Red Lantern saves Green Lantern from being killed by Major Blaze, but is seemingly killed in the process. However, Red Lantern suddenly revives himself and annihilates the Crimson Host. Green Lantern disarms Red Lantern of his ring and leaves him in green restraint constructs. Six weeks later, Green Lantern is taken to the House of Detention by Doiby Dickles. Once there, Green Lantern visits Red Lantern, who states that Adolf Hitler is looking for the Red Labs. He asks Green Lantern to stop Hitler before it is too late. After Green Lantern leaves, Red Lantern learns that he can harness the Crimson Flame without using a power ring. Green Lantern then meets with J. Edgar Hoover, who mentions that he called in the JSA to help deal with the Crimson Host. While daring Hoover to reveal his secret to the world, Green Lantern tells him to lose the private call button he has as the JSA is now under new management. Back in the present, it is revealed that Alan had been telling his story to his son Obsidian. Time-traveling to 1941, Alan writes a letter to himself, telling him that he is still loved.

== Titles ==
=== Prelude issues ===
Title	Issues	Writers	Artists	Debut date	Conclusion date
Stargirl Spring Break Special	1	Geoff Johns	Todd Nauck; Bryan Hitch; Fred Hembeck	May 25, 2021	
Flashpoint Beyond	0–6	Geoff Johns; Jeremy Adams; Tim Sheridan	Eduardo Risso; Xermánico; Mikel Janín	April 12, 2022	October 18, 2022

=== Main issues ===
Title	Issues	Writers	Artists	Debut date	Conclusion date
The New Golden Age	1	Geoff Johns	Diego Olortegui; J.P. Mayer; Scott Hanna; Jerry Ordway; Steve Lieber; Todd Nauck; Scott Kolins; Viktor Bogdanovic; Brandon Peterson; Gary Frank	November 7, 2022	
Justice Society of America (vol. 4)	1–12	Geoff Johns	Mikel Janín	November 29, 2022	October 2, 2024

=== Tie-in issues ===
Title	Issues	Writers	Artists	Debut date	Conclusion date
Stargirl: The Lost Children	1–6	Geoff Johns	Todd Nauck	November 15, 2022	May 9, 2023
Wesley Dodds: The Sandman	1–6	Robert Venditti	Riley Rossmo	October 10, 2023	March 12, 2024
Jay Garrick: The Flash	1–6	Jeremy Adams	Diego Olortegui	October 17, 2023	April 16, 2024
Alan Scott: The Green Lantern	1–6	Tim Sheridan	Cian Tormey	October 23, 2023	May 21, 2024

== Critical reception ==
On Comicbook Roundup, The New Golden Age #1 received an average review of 8.1 out of 10 based on 13 reviews, the main The New Golden Age story received an average rating of 7.8 out of 10 based on 76 reviews, and Stargirl: The Lost Children received an average rating of 8.6 based on 59 reviews.

== See also ==
- Golden Age of Comic Books
