= Neil Gaiman's Midnight Days =

1999 compilation of comics by Neil Gaiman

- Cover of Neil Gaiman's Midnight Days, art by Dave McKean.

Publication information
- Publisher: Vertigo (imprint of DC Comics)
- Publication date: 1999 (Original), 2012 (Deluxe Edition)

Creative team
- Written by: Neil Gaiman
- Artist: Various (depending on the stories)

Neil Gaiman's Midnight Days is a 1999 compilation of new and previously released comics stories written by British author Neil Gaiman, and published by the Vertigo imprint of American company DC Comics. A thematic sequel collection was released in 2004 titled The Sandman: Endless Nights.

== Background ==
Due to Gaiman's increased popularity resulting from his series The Sandman, DC chose to collect some of his earliest and hardest-to-find work in a single volume. Included is his previously unpublished "tryout" story for DC editor Karen Berger. The story, "Jack in the Green", was illustrated by Stephen R. Bissette and John Totleben, colored by Tatjana Wood, and lettered by John Costanza, the same team that collaborated on much of Alan Moore's run on Swamp Thing.

Other stories in the collection include:

- "Hold Me", a John Constantine tale with art by frequent Gaiman collaborator Dave McKean, originally published as Hellblazer #27
- "Brothers", a Swamp Thing story in which, however, this character does not appear (the protagonist being Brother Power the Geek), with art by Richard Piers Rayner, Mike Hoffman, and Kim DeMulder, originally published as Swamp Thing Annual #5
- "Shaggy God Stories", a post-Millennium Floronic Man story with art by Mike Mignola, also from Swamp Thing Annual #5
- "Sandman Midnight Theatre", the one and only meeting between the Golden Age Sandman and the Sandman of the Endless, originally published as the Sandman Midnight Theatre one-shot, co-written by Matt Wagner (plot) and Neil Gaiman (plot/script), with painted art by Teddy Kristiansen

The expanded "Deluxe Edition" published in 2012 also includes the framing sequence from Welcome Back to the House of Mystery #1, illustrated by Sergio Aragones.
