= Northwind (character) =

- Northwind as depicted in Hawkman #19 (November 2003). Art by Scot Eaton.

Publication information
- Publisher: DC Comics
- First appearance: All-Star Squadron #25 (September 1983)
- Created by: Roy Thomas (writer); Jerry Ordway (artist)

In-story information
- Alter ego: Norda Cantrell
- Species: Feitheran-human hybrid
- Team affiliations: Infinity, Inc.
- Abilities: Superhuman strength and durability; Aerial adaptation; Avian communication; Avian control; Sensing weather patterns; Enhanced vision; Flight; Feitheran magic

Northwind is a fictional character appearing in American comic books published by DC Comics.

Created by Roy Thomas, Jerry Ordway and Mike Machlan, Northwind first appeared in All-Star Squadron #25. He also appeared in the Infinity Inc. comic, although he left the team partway through the run.

== Creation ==
Thomas spoke on the creation of the character, stating:

"As a longtime Hawkman fan, I wanted Carter and Shiera Hall represented in the new group, even if not by a blood relative. After all, for an offspring of theirs to have real wings, we'd have had to jump through some hoops, since the Halls strapped on synthetic wings and belts of Nth Metal when they went trolling for criminals. Instead, we settled on a godchild. For years I had been enraptured by the Gardner Fox/Joe Kubert Hawkman tale "The Land of the Bird People" in Flash Comics #71 (May 1946); so Dann and I came up with Northwind, a half human, half Arctic bird-person."

== Fictional character biography ==
Norda as an Infinitor.

After learning of its existence in the Explorer's Club, Hawkman (Carter Hall) travels to the hidden city of Feithera in Greenland and saves its native people from human invaders intent on hunting them. For years, Hawkman visits the Feitherans. With their permission, he brings along an anthropologist colleague, Fred Cantrell, who intends to study the Feitherans. A Feitheran woman named Osroro immediately falls in love with Cantrell despite being betrothed to another Feitheran named Ramphastos. Ramphastos leaves Feithera and the couple is able to marry, although most Feitherans do not support their union.

Worla, Norda's grandfather and spiritual leader of the Feithereans, knows of the irrevocable destiny prophesied for Hawkman's son Hector, but decides not to tell him. This was caused by the curse of Seketh, the ancient Egyptian god of death, which prophesied that the combination of the Silver Scarab and the Eye of Ra would destroy Earth. Thoth, the first Feitheran leader, and a group of Egyptian birdpeople traveled to Greenland and founded Feithera in the hope of stopping the curse. Despite their efforts, Hector Hall fulfills the prophecy by being born without a soul.

Norda leaves Feithera at age 15. Thanks to his stamina and inborn Feitheran migration senses, Norda reaches Washington, D.C., the city in which his father was born. Norda lives on the streets for some time before making contact with the Halls, who take him in. Norda returns to Feithera for the coming of age ceremony, in which each adult Feitheran receives their life scroll, which dictates that person's role in Feitheran society, and decided their future mate. Norda is destined to marry a Feitheran girl named Isos, and Worla plans to make him his successor as spiritual leader of the Feitheran people, but Norda refuses, denying his pre-ordained role in Feitheran society. In a last-ditch attempt to make him stay, Worla reveals the prophecy of Hector Hall to his grandson, but Norda rips up his life-scroll and flies away.

Norda returns just as Hector Hall, Lyta Trevor, and Albert Rothstein decide to adopt heroic identities and apply for membership in the Justice Society of America. Norda joins them, and they apply as the Silver Scarab, Fury, Nuklon, and Northwind. They are turned down for membership, but together with the Star-Spangled Kid, Obsidian, Jade, Brainwave Jr., Power Girl and Huntress, they form their own group, Infinity, Inc. During one of his adventures with Infinity, Inc., Northwind assists in moving Feithera to a location called New Feithera.

Hector Hall leaves Infinity, Inc. after a falling out with Lyta and Doctor Hastor (a re-incarnated Hath-Set) contacting him. Norda believes the prophecy his grandfather had warned him of was coming to pass. Traveling to Hall Mansion, Norda attempts to confront Hector, only to find him already under Hath-Set's control. Going to Old Feithera in hopes of uncovering the means to defeat this ancient evil, he once again meets his grandfather Worla. Worla trains Norda in the occult traditions of Feithera and teaches him to harness the power of Thoth inherent in all Feitherans.

Returning to Infinity, Inc., Northwind is a changed man, sporting a new look, demeanor and the ability to fire powerful blasts of mystic energy from his hands. The now-possessed Silver Scarab and Hath-Set uncover the Eye of Ra, a powerful and ancient weapon. Northwind is able to close the Eye of Ra, sending it away to sleep under the sands of Egypt and end its rampage, but Hector Hall is killed. Northwind has become aloof and distant after his training in Feithera, and now accepts his role as spiritual leader of the Feitherans.

=== Kahndaq ===
Through yet undisclosed events, Northwind and the Feitherans evolve into an even more bird-like state, losing their capability of speech, and New Feithera is destroyed. Black Adam convinces Northwind and the other Feitherans to join him and take over his ancestral homeland Kahndaq.

== Powers and abilities ==
Northwind is a bird-like humanoid who possesses enhanced athletic prowess and agility. He appears to have advanced regenerative abilities, as well as superhuman strength and stamina. He also possesses what he calls "migra-power", an inborn migration sense which enables him to fly long distances and prevents him from getting lost. He can also communicate with birds and sense approaching weather patterns. After training under his grandfather Worla, Northwind gained mastery of Feitheran magic, which allows him to project mystical fire from his palms.

== In other media ==
Northwind appears as a character summon in Scribblenauts Unmasked: A DC Comics Adventure.
