= Sandman Midnight Theatre =

1995 American one-shot comic book

Publication information
- Publisher: Vertigo
- Format: One-shot
- Publication date: 1995
- No. of issues: 1
- Main character(s): Sandman; Dream; Wesley Dodds

Creative team
- Written by: Matt Wagner (co-plot); Neil Gaiman (co-plot/script)
- Artist: Teddy Kristiansen
- Letterer: Todd Klein

Sandman Midnight Theatre is a one-shot comic book in which two DC comics characters called the Sandman — Dream and Wesley Dodds — encounter each other. Sandman Midnight Theatre was co-written by Sandman Mystery Theatre author Matt Wagner (co-plot) and The Sandman author Neil Gaiman (co-plot/script), and featured painted artwork by Teddy Kristiansen and lettering by Todd Klein. In 1996, it received the Comics Buyer's Guide Fan Award for Favorite Original Graphic Novel/Album of 1995.

== Publication history ==
Sandman Midnight Theatre was published with a cover date of September 1995. The following issue of The Sandman's regular series was #72, in which Dodds appeared out of costume as an epilogue to the events in this book. Chronologically, The Sandman #72 happened long after Sandman Midnight Theatre, which occurred during Dream's imprisonment. In terms of Sandman Mystery Theatre, Sandman Midnight Theatre occurs between the storylines "The Python" and "The Mist" (between issues #36 and #37).

== Plot ==
Following the events of "The Python," Dian Belmont left New York City for London. Dodds uses a murder case as an excuse to follow her, and he finds her working at a church's soup kitchen. While Belmont deliberately avoids Dodds, both end up, for different reasons, at a party held by Roderick Burgess, the man who imprisoned Dream in his cellar.

== Collected editions ==
The graphic novel was reprinted in the 1999 anthology, Neil Gaiman's Midnight Days.
