= Doctor Death (character) =

DC Comics supervillain

Dr. Death
- Dr. Death as depicted in Batman (vol. 2) #25 (January 2014). Art by Greg Capullo.

Publication information
- Publisher: DC Comics
- First appearance: Detective Comics #29 (July 1939)
- Created by: Gardner Fox (writer); Bob Kane (artist)

In-story information
- Alter ego: Dr. Karl Hellfern
- Species: Metahuman
- Team affiliations: Science Squad
- Partnerships: Riddler
- Abilities: Chemical and biological weapons

Doctor Death (Dr. Karl Hellfern) is a supervillain appearing in American comic books by DC Comics, primarily as an enemy of Batman. Created by Gardner Fox and Bob Kane, he first appeared in Detective Comics #29 (July 1939). He is notable as the first traditional supervillain to be encountered by Batman as well as his first recurring foe.

== Publication history ==
The character first appeared in Detective Comics #29 in 1939. The scriptwriter for Detective Comics #29 and #30 is an issue of dispute, leaving the creator of Doctor Death uncertain. Batman creator Bob Kane is officially credited as scriptwriter of these issues, though later Gardner Fox, the scriptwriter of Detective Comics #31 and #32, claimed authorship.

== Fictional character biography ==
=== Golden Age ===
In his first appearance in Detective Comics #29, Doctor Death develops a lethal chemical agent from pollen extract and plans to use the poison to extort money from wealthy Gotham City citizens. He is assisted by a large East Indian manservant Jabah. He decides to eliminate Batman, and threatens to kill someone unless Batman stops him. Batman defeats his two henchmen, but is wounded when Jabah shoots him, though he escapes using a gas pellet. He then gets to Doctor Death's base, meeting him in his lab, and chases him around the building. To evade capture, Doctor Death ignites chemicals in his laboratory, presumably killing Jabah and himself in the resulting explosion.

Doctor Death next appears the following month in Detective Comics #30. With a new accomplice, a Cossack named Mikhail, Doctor Death is this time successful in claiming a victim in his extortion scheme, but discovers from the widow that the poisoned man lost his fortune in the Great Depression. Batman intervenes in the plot, following Mikhail back to Doctor Death's base, and upon apprehending the doctor, discovers that his face had been horribly disfigured from the lab explosion, giving him a brown, skeletal appearance.

=== Bronze Age revival ===
After several decades' absence, writer Gerry Conway reintroduced Doctor Death in Batman #345 and Detective Comics #512 (1982). Conway's story is an update of the original 1939 tale. In this version, Doctor Death is depicted as a paraplegic, but his deadly gas gimmick remains the same. He is assisted this time by a manservant named Togo.

=== Modern Age ===
Doctor Death was revived once again in Batgirl #42-44 and #50 (2003–2004) by writer Dylan Horrocks. The modern version of the character is a producer of biological weapons, often selling them on the black market to terrorists and other criminals. He is now depicted as a bald, gnome-like man wearing a lab coat and an oxygen mask. This incarnation of Doctor Death makes a minor appearance in Batman: War Games, where he is seen working with Black Mask.

=== The New 52 ===
In September 2011, The New 52 rebooted DC's continuity. Doctor Death is reintroduced in Batman #25 as part of the story arc Batman: Zero Year. He is once again established as one of the first supervillains encountered by Batman early in his career. A disgruntled former Wayne Enterprises scientist, Doctor Death murders several people with a serum that causes uncontrolled bone growth. He is depicted with a skeletal appearance, a result of testing his serum on himself. Dr. Death joins forces with the Riddler to try to seize control of Gotham City during a super-storm.

In Batman #29 (2014), it is revealed that Doctor Death created his bone serum in an attempt to eliminate human weakness. This was motivated by the death of his son, a soldier who had been sent to locate the missing Bruce Wayne overseas. Doctor Death battles Batman aboard a blimp in the midst of the storm. He is struck by shrapnel from an explosion, which causes his mutated bones to begin growing again, seemingly killing him.

== Other characters named Doctor Death ==
- A different character named Doctor Death appears in Doom Patrol #107 (November 1966).
- In Sandman Mystery Theatre #21 (December 1994), Wesley Dodds encounters a serial killer named "Doctor Death", a.k.a. Dr. Raymond Kesslor. This Doctor Death euthanizes elderly patients, in a reference to Jack Kevorkian.
- A rogue doctor styling himself "Doctor Death" is the villain of the Scoop Smith story in Whiz Comics #2. This issue features the first appearance of Captain Marvel, later Shazam.

== In other media ==
Doctor Death appears as a character summon in Scribblenauts Unmasked: A DC Comics Adventure.
