= Sandman (DC Comics) =

Pseudonym of several DC Comics characters

- Wesley Dodds as the Sandman. Art by Gavin Wilson and Richard Bruning.

Publication information
- Publisher: DC Comics
- First appearance: Dodds: New York World's Fair Comics #1 (April 1939); Sanford: The Sandman #1 (December 1974); Marshall: Sandman Mystery Theatre: Sleep of Reason #1 (February 2007)
- Created by: Dodds: Gardner Fox (writer); Bert Christman (artist); Sanford: Joe Simon; Jack Kirby; Marshall: John Ney Rieber; Eric Nguyen

In-story information
- Alter ego: Wesley Dodds; Garrett Sanford; Hector Hall; Morpheus; Daniel Hall; Sandy Hawkins; Kieran Marshall
- Team affiliations: Justice Society of America; Justice League
- Abilities: See list: Wesley Dodds; Prophetic dreams; Expert hand-to-hand combatant and marksman; Decelerated aging; Use of gas gun Morpheus; Incarnation of dream and reality; Vast cosmic powers; Magic mastery; Reality manipulation; Nigh-omniscience; Omnipresence; Telepathy; Immortality Sandy Hawkins; Silicon-based body is elastic and resilient, morphs into sand and emits seismic disruptions; Prophetic dreams; Weapon proficiency; Use of gas gun

The Sandman is the pseudonym of several fictional characters appearing in comic books published by DC Comics. They have appeared in stories of various genres, including the pulp detective character Wesley Dodds, superheroes such as Garrett Sanford and Hector Hall, and mythic fantasy characters more commonly called by the name Dream. Named after the folklore character that is said to bring pleasant dreams to children, each has had some thematic connection to dreaming, and efforts have been made to tie them into a common continuity within the DC Universe.

== Fictional character biographies ==
=== Wesley Dodds ===
Wesley Dodds is the first DC Comics fictional character to bear the name of the Sandman. Attired in a green business suit, fedora, and gas mask, the Sandman uses a gun emitting a sleeping gas to sedate criminals. He starts out as reminiscent of a pulp magazine anti-hero, but eventually develops into a more standard superhero, becoming a founder of the Justice Society of America. He later uses sand and a blowtorch that he could use to quickly create walls, and wears a purple and gold costume. Sandman would later pick up a sidekick, Sandy the Golden Boy. The Sandman appeared in Adventure Comics #40 (July 1939) through #102 (February 1946).

=== Garrett Sanford ===
Sandman
- The Sandman #1. Art by Jack Kirby.

Publication information
- Publisher: DC Comics
- Schedule: Bi-monthly
- Format: Ongoing series
- Publication date: 1974–1976
- No. of issues: 6
- Main characters: Sandman (later revealed as Garrett Sanford); Brute and Glob; Jed Paulsen; Ezra Paulsen; Clarice; Barnaby

Creative team
- Created by: Jack Kirby, Joe Simon
- Written by: Joe Simon, Michael Fleisher
- Penciller(s): Jack Kirby, Ernie Chua
- Inker(s): Jack Kirby, Mike Royer, Wally Wood

The Sandman of the 1970s was created by Joe Simon and Jack Kirby. Issue #1 was intended as a one-shot, but five more issues and an additional story followed. After the first issue, the stories were written by Michael Fleisher. The second and third issues were illustrated by Ernie Chua. Inks were by Kirby, Mike Royer and, in the sixth issue, Wally Wood. All covers were by Kirby, and the fourth issue noted his return to the interior artwork on the cover.

Kirby and Simon reimagined the Sandman inspired by the Sandman of popular folkloer, who induces people to sleep with use of a powder. There was no detailed origin story or explation for this version of the character. The Sandman is assisted by two living nightmares named Brute and Glob. They are implied to be relatively harmless and well-intentioned once freed. Using security monitoring devices, the Sandman can enter the "Dream Stream" or the "Reality Stream", and he carries a pouch of dream dust with which he can cause anyone to sleep and dream. The Sandman's main task is protecting children from nightmare monsters within their dreams, especially one young boy named Jed Paulsen, who lives with his grandfather Ezra Paulsen. The Sandman also ensures children have an appropriate level of nightmares rather than dealing with such anxieties in real life.

The Nightmare Wizard is the Sandman's antagonist in three stories, a character who creates nightmares that are too extreme and sometimes kill children who dream them.

In the final Fleischer-Kirby-created adventure (intended for The Sandman #7 but published in The Best of DC #22) he even assists the legendary Santa Claus against a menacing band of Seal Men who are angry about being sent the wrong gifts during the previous Christmas.

This version of the Sandman only appeared for a handful of issues and was largely ignored for years thereafter. In a retcon by Roy Thomas, appearing in Wonder Woman #300 (February 1983), the 1970's Kirby-Simon Sandman is revealed to be Dr. Garrett Sanford, a UCLA psychology professor who became trapped in the Dream Dimension while saving the life of a great man who was in a coma while being terrorized by a powerful nightmare monster. It is implied this powerful man was a US President. This issue introduce the limitation the Sandman can depart the Dream Dimension for only one hour at a time. Nontheless, Sanford tries to romance Diana in spite of her acceptance of Steve Trevor's proposal of marriage. The issue also introduced Hippolyta Trevor (daughter of the Earth-Two counterparts of Diana and Steve Trevor), who would later be married to Sanford's successor, Hector Hall, and a major character in the Vertigo series as mother of Daniel Hall.

This version of the Sandman also became an honorary member of the Justice League in Justice League of America Annual #1 (1983) (written by Paul Levitz and Len Wein), in which they fought Doctor Destiny, who had trapped Sanford in a tube like those used for Brute and Glob, and eventually the Justice League as well. Sanford declined a full membership because he cannot leave the Dream Dimension for more than an hour at a time.

The latter two appearances, and the subsequent uses of the costume, featured a red hourglass on the front of the suit, a detail which did not appear in the art by Kirby or Chua.

Letters pages in the original Kirby-Simon series often complained of the series being too juvenile. (Note: Issue #2, issue #5—Orlando responded that The Sandman and Swamp Thing were intended for very different audiences. Sanford, Jed, Brute, and Glob eventually appeared in a one-panel cameo in Swamp Thing (vol. 2) #62.) This childlike tone had changed in later depictions, as Wonder Woman #300 makes references to sexual dreams and has Sanford admit to observing Diana's dreams inappropriately.

Sandman, Jed, Brute, and Glob, observed by Metron, appeared in one panel of Swamp Thing #62, Rick Veitch's first writing on the series.

In Infinity, Inc. #50 (May 1988), it is revealed Sanford had since gone insane due to the loneliness of the Dream Dimension and ended his life.

In 2016, DC Comics implemented another relaunch of its books called "DC Rebirth" which restored its continuity to a form much as it was prior to "The New 52". Garrett Sanford has been operating in the Dreaming as Sandman for a long time while being served by Brute and Glob. Unlike the pre-Crisis version, this version of Sanford wields an Orichalchum Whistle that enables him to leave the Dreaming. Sandman appeared to help Forager after falling into a trap by General Electric wielding a copy of the Orichalcum Whistle. Electric's plot was thwarted when Forager traveled back in time and caused a paradox.

=== Hector Hall ===
In Infinity Inc. #50 (May 1988), Hector Hall (formerly the Silver Scarab and son of Carter Hall) has now supplanted the deceased Sanford as the Sandman, and uses Sanford's body after his own was taken by the second Silver Scarab. Hector becoming Sandman was caused by Brute and Glob.

In The Sandman vol. 2 #12 (1990), it is revealed that the Dream Dimension is a small pocket dream world in the mind of Jed Walker created by Brute and Glob, two former servants of Dream who escaped his realm during his absence. Hall died some years prior, and that his incarnation as the Sandman is merely a shell that Dream sucks into another part of the Dreaming when he defeats the two creatures as the collapsing of this "Dream Dimension" unleashed a shockwave that accidentally killed Jed's abusive Aunt Clarice and Uncle Barnaby.

Hall goes on to be reincarnated as Doctor Fate. His only appearances as Sandman are in Infinity, Inc. #49–51, The Sandman vol. 2, #11–12 and The Sandman Presents: The Thessaliad #2.

Ambush Bug briefly wore the Sanford/Hall costume in Ambush Bug Nothing Special #1 in an attempt to become Dream's sidekick.

This Sandman likeness appeared, along with Brute and Glob, in JSA #63–64. This time, the costume was worn by Sandy Hawkins. Daniel Hall recaptured Brute and Glob and again retired the Kirby Sandman design.

=== Dream ===
Dream, also known as Morpheus, is one of seven archetypal beings referred to as the Endless who embody various aspects of existence. He is the main character of the second Sandman series, written by Neil Gaiman. Dream is the personification of dreams, storytelling and—because the Endless also represent the opposite of that which they personify—reality. Gaiman's Dream more closely resembles the concept of the Sandman as he is portrayed in mythology than a traditional superhero genre character. In the course of Gaiman's story arcs, it is retconned that the other DC characters named Sandman were connected to Morpheus. For instance, Wesley Dodds' prophetic dreams warning him of crimes and disasters are explained as an attempt by reality to fill the void left by Dream's absence from his realm during most of the 20th century, while the Kirby version of the Sandman is the result of two nightmares trying to manipulate a human being into fulfilling that same role in the hopes that they would be able to control the new incarnation of Dream.

=== Daniel Hall ===
Daniel Hall, the child of Hector Hall, eventually assumes the position of Dream when Morpheus dies. He, like Morpheus, is the embodiment of dreams, storytelling and reality. He refers to himself as simply "Dream of the Endless"; in The Wake he states that he has no right to the name of "Morpheus", and that the part of him which was the mortal boy Daniel Hall no longer exists.

=== Sandy Hawkins ===
Some time later in the pages of JSA 63–64, the chairman and heir to the Sandman legacy Sand has his soul stolen by Brute and Glob to briefly assume the role of the Dream Dimension's protector, again in the Kirby-designed costume. Doctor Fate (Hector Hall) and his wife Lyta lead a contingent of the JSA to Sand's rescue, with Brute and Glob being abjured to a part of the Dream Dimension known only as "The Darkness".

Subsequently, Sand officially adopted the Sandman name and a costume patterned after Wesley Dodds in the third volume of Justice Society of America.

=== Kieran Marshall ===
Kieran Marshall as the Sandman on the cover of Sandman Mystery Theatre: Sleep of Reason #3. Art by Tim Bradstreet.

In the Sandman Mystery Theatre: Sleep of Reason mini-series, photojournalist Kieran Marshall briefly takes on the identity of the Sandman to battle insurgents in Afghanistan, inspired by a visit Wesley Dodds made to the region shortly before his death.

== In other media ==
=== Television ===
==== Live-action ====
- An unrelated Sandman appears in the Batman consecutive episodes "The Sandman Cometh" and "The Catwoman Goeth", portrayed by Michael Rennie. This version is an international criminal who uses special hypnotic sand to control sleepwalkers to do his bidding.
- A character loosely inspired by the Sandman under the pseudonym of Nightshade appears in The Flash, portrayed by Jason Bernard. This version is Dr. Desmond Powell, a 1950s vigilante who captured criminals using a knockout gun and tranquilizer darts. After defeating "The Ghost" in 1955 and retiring from superheroics, he became a doctor and Chief of Staff at Central City Hospital. When the Ghost reappears in 1990, Powell becomes Nightshade once again and joins forces with the Flash to apprehend his old enemy. After unknowingly inspiring the Deadly Nightshade, Powell is framed for multiple counts of murder. Nonetheless, he eventually clears his name, captures the impostor, makes his secret identity public, and becomes a celebrity.
- The Wesley Dodds incarnation of Sandman appears in the Smallville two-part episode "Absolute Justice", portrayed by Ken Lawson.
- The Wesley Dodds incarnation of Sandman makes a non-speaking cameo appearance in the Stargirl pilot episode, portrayed by an uncredited actor.
- Dream, Hector Hall, and Daniel Hall appear in The Sandman, portrayed by Tom Sturridge, Lloyd Everitt and Jacob Anderson respectively.

==== Animation ====
- Sandy Hawkins / Sand makes non-speaking appearances in Justice League Unlimited.
- The Wesley Dodds incarnation of Sandman makes a non-speaking cameo appearance in the Batman: The Brave and the Bold episode "Crisis: 22,300 Miles Above Earth!".
- The Wesley Dodds incarnation of Sandman makes a non-speaking cameo appearance in the Young Justice episode "Humanity".

=== Film ===
- An unidentified, alternate universe version of Sandman appears in Justice League: Crisis on Two Earths as a minor member of the Crime Syndicate.
- An alternate universe version of Wesley Dodds / Sandman appears in Justice League: The Flashpoint Paradox.
- The Wesley Dodds incarnation of Sandman makes a cameo appearance in Superman via a mural at the Hall of Justice.

=== Miscellaneous ===
An unidentified Sandman appears in the DC Super Hero Girls episode "Welcome to Super Hero High" as a graduate of the titular school.

== See also ==
- Jack Kirby bibliography
- Sandman (comics) - Lists other comic book characters with the same name
