= Sandman Mystery Theatre =

American superhero comic published by Vertigo

- Cover to Sandman Mystery Theatre #29 (August 1995) by Gavin Wilson.

Publication information
- Publisher: Vertigo Comics
- Schedule: Monthly
- Format: Ongoing series
- Genre: Detective, superhero
- Publication date: April 1993 – February 1999
- No. of issues: 70; Annual #1
- Main character(s): Wesley Dodds; Dian Belmont

Creative team
- Written by: Matt Wagner; Steven T. Seagle
- Artist: List: Guy Davis John Watkiss R. G. Taylor Vince Locke Warren Pleece Matthew Dow Smith
- Penciller: Michael Lark
- Inker: Richard Case
- Letterer(s): John Costanza; Gaspar Saladino; Clem Robins
- Colorist: David Hornung
- Editor: Karen Berger List: Assistants: Shelly Bond Keri Kowalski Joan Hilty

Sandman Mystery Theatre was an ongoing comic book series published by Vertigo Comics, the mature-readers imprint of DC Comics. It ran for 70 issues, one annual, and a cross-over special between 1993 and 1999 and retells the adventures of the Sandman, a vigilante whose main weapon is a gun that fires sleeping gas, originally created by DC in the Golden Age of Comic Books. In a similar vein to Batman, the Sandman possesses little to no superhuman powers, though he has minor precognitive abilities through his prophetic dreams, and relies on his detective skills and inventions.

In this film noir-like series by writers Matt Wagner and Steven T. Seagle, Wesley Dodds (the Sandman) and his girlfriend Dian Belmont (daughter of the District Attorney) encountered several, often grotesque, foes in multi-issue storylines. The team of Dodds and Belmont were a nod to Nick and Nora Charles of The Thin Man novel and movies.

== Art ==
The first artist was Guy Davis, who defined the visual look of the character. Davis changed Dodds from the traditional portrayal as a tall, square-jawed figure, making him shorter, round-faced and slightly overweight. He also gave Dodds a pair of round spectacles, visually echoing the round eyepieces of the gas mask he wore as the Sandman.

Davis also redesigned the Sandman costume. In the original 1930s comics, the Sandman wore a green suit, purple cape, orange fedora and blue-and-yellow gas mask. For Sandman Mystery Theatre, the color palette was toned down to gray, olive green and brown. The super-heroic trappings were downplayed in favor of a "real-world" sensibility, such as a trench coat instead of the cape.

For the second and third story arcs, "The Face" and "The Brute", art was provided by John Watkiss and R. G. Taylor respectively.

A minor controversy developed around the second storyline, "The Face". A coloring error resulted in Asian characters being portrayed with bright yellow skin. The editor apologized for the error in the letter column of a subsequent issue.

Guy Davis returned for the fourth arc and the remainder of the series with occasional additional work from Vince Locke and Warren Pleece.

== Themes and guest stars ==
Set during the late 1930s, before Dodds became a founding member of the Justice Society of America, this series dealt with mature themes such as abortion, racism, and anti-Semitism, as well as historical themes such as the rise of Nazism and international appeasement. As the series progressed Wesley encountered in his adventures other "mystery men" of the era, including the Crimson Avenger, Starman, Blackhawk and the Hourman. In issue #23 the Sandman interrogates a boxer outside Grant's Gym, and the man mentions the name "Ted", a reference to Ted Grant, the original Wildcat. A reference is made to Detective Jim Corrigan, later to be known as the Spectre. Doctor Mid-Nite, alias Dr. Charles McNider is also mentioned as the physician that treated Wesley in issue #27.

Dodds and Belmont would themselves guest star in the popular comic Starman (set in the present day), appearing as older versions of themselves, and in flashbacks done by Davis himself in the same art-style as Sandman Mystery Theatre. They also guest-starred in the "Exodus Noir" storyline of Madame Xanadu, set during the 1940s.

== Differences ==
The series introduced many changes to previous representations of Sandman's early years; however, as the title is under the Vertigo imprint it is not bound by standard DC Universe continuity. Relating to standard continuity these changes would be considered retcons, but the series is instead intended to serve as an alternative telling of Sandman's origin. One such change in the series included Wesley Dodds' portrayal as a quiet man who is considered odd by others instead of a playboy socialite. Some of the retcons introduced in Sandman Mystery Theatre have been reflected in modern DC continuity. One such retcon that was later overturned was that of the character of Sandy Hawkins being nothing more than a fictional comic book character with Dian Belmont instead acting as Sandman's sidekick "Sandy" on at least one occasion. Also, Dian's death had previously been recounted in All-Star Squadron #18, but in this new continuity she lives well into old age and remains Dodds's companion for life.

== Dream ==
The revival of the character was due in part to the success of a later, related character created by Neil Gaiman: Dream of the Endless, whose adventures were then being published under the title of The Sandman (hence the need for a more elaborate title for the older character's adventures). Dream made numerous cameo appearances in Wesley Dodds' dreams throughout the series.

The two characters met briefly in a one-shot special, Sandman Midnight Theatre, co-written by Gaiman and Wagner.

== Reception ==
In their review of Sandman Mystery Theatre #41–48, Wizard gave the series a 5 on a scale of 1 to 6, particularly praising the historical authenticity of the lingo and cultural norms, as well as the intricately developed characters, "horrific" villains, and unique atmosphere. Their one major criticism was that it is too difficult for new readers to follow what is going on if they begin reading the series in the middle of a story arc.

== 2007 revival series ==
DC published a new five-issue limited series, Sandman Mystery Theatre: Sleep of Reason, set in 2007 and featuring a new character taking up the Sandman mantle.

== Collected editions ==
The comics have been collected in a number of trade paperbacks:

- Sandman Mystery Theatre:
  - The Tarantula (by Matt Wagner, with art by Guy Davis, collects #1–4, 112 pages, May 2005, ISBN 1-56389-195-6)
  - The Face and The Brute (by Matt Wagner, with art by John Watkiss and R.G. Taylor, collects #5–12, 208 pages, November 2004, ISBN 1-4012-0345-0)
  - The Vamp (by Matt Wagner and Steven T. Seagle, with art by Guy Davis, collects #13–16, 104 pages, July 2005, ISBN 1-4012-0718-9)
  - The Scorpion (by Matt Wagner and Steven T. Seagle, with art by Guy Davis, collects #17–20, 104 pages, May 2006, ISBN 1-4012-1040-6)
  - Dr. Death and The Night of the Butcher (by Matt Wagner and Steven T. Seagle, with art by Guy Davis and Vince Locke, collects #21–28, 208 pages, April 2007, ISBN 1-4012-1237-9)
  - The Hourman and The Python (by Matt Wagner and Steven T. Seagle, with art by Guy Davis and Warren Pleece, collects #29–36, 200 pages, March 2008, ISBN 1-4012-1677-3)
  - The Mist and The Phantom of the Fair (by Matt Wagner and Steven T. Seagle, with art by Guy Davis, collects #37–44, 200 pages, March 2009, ISBN 1-4012-2139-4)
  - The Blackhawk and The Return of the Scarlet Ghost (by Matt Wagner and Steven T. Seagle, with art by Matthew Smith and Guy Davis, collects #45–52, 224 pages, April 2010, ISBN 978-1-4012-2583-4)
  - Book One (collects #1–12, 328 pages, June 2016, ISBN 978-1-4012-6327-0)
  - Book Two (collects #13–24 and Annual #1, 384 pages, January 2017, ISBN 978-1-4012-6569-4)
  - Book Three (collects #25–36 and Sandman Midnight Theatre #1, 368 pages, June 2017, ISBN 978-1-4012-7094-0. Unreleased)
  - Compendium One (collects #1–36 and Annual #1, 981 pages, May 2023, ISBN 978-1-77952-153-8)
  - Compendium Two (collects #37-70 and Vertigo: Winter's Edge #1-2, 888 pages, August 2025, ISBN 978-1-7995-0489-4)
