= List of DC Comics characters: H =

== Hackett ==
Hackett is a former pilot of the Royal Air Force who later became a henchman of the heroin manufacturer China White. Decades prior, he manipulated Oliver Queen into investing in illegal offshore accounts, though Queen was unaware that the money was being used for drug trafficking.

=== Hackett in other media ===
Two characters loosely based on Hackett, David "Dave" Hackett and his son Sam Hackett, appear in Arrow, portrayed by Ben Cotton and Luke Camilleri respectively. The former worked as a bodyguard for Robert Queen while the latter is a former minor criminal and electrical engineer. In flashbacks, Dave accompanied Robert on his yacht, the Queen's Gambit, as part of a business trip to China. However, the ship sank and Dave, Robert, and Robert's son Oliver were left adrift on a raft until Robert killed Dave and himself to ensure Oliver's survival. In the present, Sam hacks the DA office's computer and obtains unredacted transcripts of Oliver's therapy sessions, through which Sam discovers his father's fate and plots revenge on Oliver. After Sam hacks Star City's power grid, Oliver attempts to calm him by telling his side of the story, but Sam refuses to stand down until Dinah Drake destroys Sam's machine and Sam is arrested.

== Sebastian Hady ==
Sebastian Hady was the corrupt mayor of Gotham City, associated with Carmine Falcone, and eventually killed by the League of Shadows.

=== Sebastian Hady in other media ===
Sebastian Hady appears in The Penguin, portrayed by Rhys Coiro. This version was a city councilman with a gambling addiction who used public funds to pay off his gambling debts.

== Hagen ==
Hagen is an Atlantean magic user who was trained by the Atlantean mage Gamemnae. He tried to control Mera before being defeated by Aquaman.

In "Infinite Crisis", Hagen appears as a member of Alexander Luthor Jr.'s Secret Society of Super Villains. He assists some of Aquaman's enemies in attacking Sub Diego, but is killed by the Spectre.

== Jack Haly ==
Jack Haly (also known as C.C. Haly) is the ringmaster of Haly's Circus, which Dick Grayson and his family worked for. When the circus came to Gotham City, Haly was confronted by Tony Zucco, who demanded protection money and murdered Dick's parents, the Flying Graysons, after he refused. Following the incident, Haly paid protection money to Zucco while Dick was taken in by Bruce Wayne.

=== Jack Haly in other media ===
- Jack Haly appears in the Batman: The Animated Series two-part episode "Robin's Reckoning", voiced by an uncredited Ed Gilbert.
- Jack Haly appears in Young Justice, voiced by Stephen Root.
- Jack Haly makes a non-speaking cameo appearance in Batman: Return of the Caped Crusaders. This version's design is similar to the Young Justice version.

== Hector Hall ==
- First appearance: All-Star Squadron #25 (September 1983)
- Created by: Roy Thomas; Jerry Ordway
- Teams: Infinity, Inc.; All-Star Squadron; Justice Society of America; Justice League
- Aliases: Silver Scarab; Sandman; Doctor Fate
- Further reading: Hector Hall at Comic Vine; Hector Hall at League of Comic Geeks; Hector Hall at the Grand Comics Database; Hector Hall at DC Database

Hector Sanders Hall (also known as Hektor Hol) is a superhero appearing in American comic books published by DC Comics. Created by Roy Thomas and Jerry Ordway, he made his first appearance in All-Star Squadron #25 (September, 1983). While having adopted various codenames, the character is frequently associated with Hawkman-related characters.

Hector Hall is the son of Carter and Shiera Hall, the Golden Age heroes known as Hawkman and Hawkgirl. Carter and Shiera were reincarnations of an ancient Egyptian pharaoh and his wife, both of whom had been killed and cursed by their rival Hath-Set. Unbeknownst to either of them, however, Hath-Set's curse also concerned the two's children. The curse of Seketh, the ancient Egyptian god of death, prophesied the combination of the Silver Scarab and the Eye of Ra, which would mean the end of the world. Hector is born without a soul and destined to be a vessel for the Silver Scarab, an agent of vengeance called forth by Hath-Set.

Feeling neglected by his parents, Hector constructs a suit out of the Nth Metal that granted his parents the power of flight, while also adding some solar improvements. Hector enrolls at UCLA and reunites with his childhood friend, Lyta Trevor. The two quickly fall in love and decide to apply for membership in the Justice Society of America. However, they, Atom Smasher, and Northwind are rejected due to their age and inexperience. Alongside Jade, Obsidian, Brainwave, Star-Spangled Kid, Power Girl, and Huntress, the heroes found a new group called Infinity, Inc.

After battling their parents and mentors (who were under the influence of Koehaha, the River of Evil), the team publicly reveals their secret identities and Hector announces his engagement to Lyta. They have little time to enjoy their happiness as the entity that had been within Hector since his birth came forth, thanks to the manipulation of Hath-Set. The reincarnated Silver Scarab battles Infinity, Inc. alongside Hath-Set and summons the Eye of Ra. The heroes manage to defeat Silver Scarab, but at the cost of Hector's life.

Hector's consciousness is cast into the Dreaming, where he is discovered by Brute and Glob, former servants of Dream who manipulate him into adopting the identity of Sandman. Some time later, Dream escapes captivity, returns Hector to the realm of the dead, and claims Hector's unborn son Daniel, who is destined to become the next Lord of Dreams.

Hector Hall later undergoes a reincarnation cycle that enables him to return to life. Shortly after his birth, Mordru accelerates Hector's aging process to adulthood, intending to usurp his power as Doctor Fate. On a later adventure in Kahndaq, Hector and Nabu clash as the latter argues the legitimacy of Black Adam's current agenda and accuses him of blindly following his father. Nabu later takes control of Hector and imprisons his spirit in the Amulet of Anubis. Within the Amulet, he is reunited with the previous incarnations of Doctor Fate: Kent Nelson, Eric Strauss, and Linda Strauss, who help him trap Nabu inside the Amulet. Lyta and Hector return to the Tower of Fate and live happily until they are trapped in Hell by the Spectre, who is on a rampage to destroy all magic. Near death, Lyta and Hector enter a portal to the Dreaming as their physical bodies die.

Following The New 52 reboot in 2011, the histories of previous Doctor Fates, including Hector Hall, were erased from continuity.

In "Infinite Frontier", Hector as the Silver Scarab appears in a portrait of the Infinity Inc. members. In a short backup story in the conclusion of the Superboy: Man of Tomorrow limited series, Changeling appears during a battle between Hawkman, Hawkwoman, and various alien creatures. He introduces himself as his son Hektor Hol, much to Hawkman's surprise.

=== Hector Hall in other media ===
Hector Hall appears in The Sandman, portrayed by Lloyd Everitt. This version is a Black British man who died in a car accident.

== Catherine Hamilton ==
Catherine Hamilton-Kane is a character appearing in American comic books published by DC Comics.

Following the death of his wife Gabrielle, Jacob Kane later remarried Hamilton Rifle Company heiress Catherine Hamilton who became Kate Kane and Beth Kane's stepmother.

=== Catherine Hamilton in other media ===
- Catherine Hamilton-Kane appears in Batwoman, portrayed by Elizabeth Anweis. This version is a defense contractor and the CEO of Hamilton Dynamics who later sacrifices herself to save her daughter Mary Hamilton after they are poisoned by Alice.
- Catherine Hamilton-Kane appears in Gotham Knights, voiced by Liz Burnette. This version became the commissioner of the Gotham City Police Department sometime after the death of James Gordon and does not share his support towards vigilantism.

== Hammer ==
Hammer is the name of several characters appearing in American comic books published by DC Comics.

=== Ivan ===
Ivan and his brother Igor were acrobats who were turned into deadly agents by the NKVD's "Red Flag" program and fought the Blackhawks as Hammer and Sickle.

=== Blackhawks foe ===
The second Hammer is an unnamed man who fought the Blackhawks.

=== Boris Ulyanov ===
Boris Ulyanov is a Russian man with super-strength and an expert at hand-to-hand combat who is the sister of Sickle. They went together as Hammer and Sickle and fought the Outsiders.

In "Infinite Crisis", Hammer and Sickle join Alexander Luthor Jr.'s Secret Society of Super Villains.

=== Superhero ===
The fourth Hammer is a British superhero who frequents a pub called "Time in a Bottle".

== Sydney Happersen ==
Sydney Happersen is a scientist working for LexCorp, deeply loyal to Lex Luthor. Luthor threatens to launch a barrage of missiles at Metropolis, but is dissuaded by Superman, who states that he would be committing mass murder. Enraged by Luthor's refusal, Happersen presses the detonation switch himself and is killed by an accidental electric surge.

=== Sydney Happersen in other media ===
- Sydney Happersen appears in media set in the DC Universe, portrayed by Stephen Blackehart. This version is a LuthorCorp scientist who specializes in dimensional portals.
  - First appearing in Superman (2025), he helps Otis Berg release a kaiju into Metropolis and later helps to control Ultraman. After Lex Luthor's plot is thwarted, Happersen is arrested.
  - Happersen makes additional appearances in Peacemaker, where he is released from prison to work for A.R.G.U.S.
- Sydney Happersen appears in Suicide Squad: Kill the Justice League, voiced by Dave B. Mitchell. This version is as a LexCorp scientist who is later killed by Lex Luthor to prevent him from revealing incriminating information.

== Harlequin ==
Harlequin is the name of four clown-themed DC Comics characters. The original Harlequin, introduced in 1944, was a foe of the Golden Age Green Lantern (Alan Scott) and later became his wife.

=== Molly Mayne ===
- First appearance: All-American Comics #89 (September 1947)
- Created by: Robert Kanigher, Irwin Hasen
- Teams: Injustice Society; Manhunters
- Further reading: Molly Mayne at Comic Vine; Molly Mayne at League of Comic Geeks; Molly Mayne at DC Database; Molly Mayne at The Comics Archive

The original Harlequin is Molly Mayne who became a harlequin-themed criminal to get Alan Scott's attention after falling in love with him. Years later, after the death of his first wife Rose Canton, Scott realizes that he had loved Mayne all this time and they got married. The Starheart behind Scott's powers stalls his aging process, causing him to remain a young man while Mayne ages normally. Mayne sells her soul to the demon Neron in return for youth and the ability to create nightmares. Scott and Kyle Rayner fight through Hell to reclaim Mayne's soul and return it to her body, restoring her true age.

In post-Rebirth continuity, Scott and Mayne are no longer married.

=== Duela Dent ===
Duela Dent is the second character to use the Harlequin name. The character was introduced in Batman Family #6 (July/August 1976). Originally appearing as a villain, she called herself the Joker's Daughter, claiming to be the daughter of the Joker. In pre-Crisis continuity, Dent is revealed to be the daughter of Two-Face and joins the Teen Titans as Harlequin. In later continuity, Dent is the daughter of the Jokester and Three-Face, the Earth-Three counterparts of the Joker and Two-Face.

=== Marcie Cooper ===
- First appearance: Infinity Inc. #4 (May 1985)
- Created by: Roy Thomas, Todd McFarlane
- Teams: Manhunters; Injustice Unlimited
- Further reading: Marcie Cooper at Comic Vine; Marcie Cooper at League of Comic Geeks; Marcie Cooper at the Grand Comics Database; Marcie Cooper at DC Database

Marcie Cooper was recruited as a youth by the Grandmaster to join the Manhunters. The Manhunters give her a job working at KGLX radio in Gotham City, alongside Molly Mayne. Cooper begins dating Northwind and later Obsidian, both of Infinity, Inc., and infiltrates the team from within. When the Manhunters attack Earth, Cooper steals Mayne's illusion-casting glasses, taking the identity of Harlequin.

=== Fourth version ===
A mysterious fourth Harlequin debuted in Green Lantern Corps Quarterly #5-6 and battled Alan Scott. As a child, she discovered she had illusion-casting powers. She learned all about the first Green Lantern, and how the first Harlequin was his lover. She knew it was her destiny to become the next Harlequin and to be with Green Lantern.

== Harlequin's Son ==
Harlequin's Son (Michael Mayne) is the son of Harlequin (Molly Mayne). Michael was in his 20s, he took one of his mother's illusion-creating glasses, made his own costume, and assaulted a gay bar while hunting down the men who previously put him in the hospital. As a civilian, Michael became an actor and was considered to join Infinity, Inc., but declined.

In Flashpoint Beyond, Harlequin's Son is among the thirteen missing Golden Age superheroes who are kidnapped by the Time Masters. The sidekicks were returned to their own times when the pods they were in failed, causing history to rebuild around them.

He is later transported to the present day, targeted males who were abusive towards their male partners, and becomes an ally of the Justice Society of America when they apprehended him. It was also revealed that the fabric of his outfit was enhanced by Wizard to provide him with some magical protection.

== Harm ==
Harm (William Hayes) is a character appearing in American comics published by DC Comics. Created by writer Peter David and artist Todd Nauck, he first appeared in Young Justice #4 (January 1999).

William Hates was an orphan boy adopted by middle-class parents and their young daughter Greta. At the age of 11, he attempted to kill his adoptive father Burt by slitting his neck. Burt narrowly survived after William missed his jugular vein and was left with a large scar.

As a teenager, Billy is approached by the demon Buzz, who offers him power. Billy later murders Greta, sacrificing her in exchange for power. He takes on the name Harm, determined to become the world's greatest murderer. Young Justice goes after Harm when he attacks Arrowette and stabs her in the arm. They attempt to capture him, but Harm defeats each member with ease before retreating to escape from the police. Harm returns home, only to be shot dead by his father.

During the "Day of Judgment" storyline, Hell freezes over, allowing Harm to return to Earth. As before, Harm is able to easily defeat Young Justice. At the last moment, Secret realizes that Harm is her brother and propels them both over a cliff. Impulse is unable to find their bodies, although Secret eventually returns.

Harm's final appearance is at the end of the Young Justice series, where he possesses his father. Greta is manipulated into joining forces with Darkseid, relocating herself and her father to Apokolips. Harm forces his father to jump into one of the fire pits, killing them both. Harm has not appeared since.

=== Harm in other media ===
- Harm appears in the Young Justice episode "Secrets", voiced by Benjamin Diskin. This version wields the Sword of Beowulf, having killed Greta to obtain it as it can only be wielded by someone who is purely good or evil. Greta's spirit forces Harm to confront his guilt over his actions, after which he loses the sword and is arrested.
- Harm appears as a character summon in Scribblenauts Unmasked: A DC Comics Adventure.

== Lian Harper ==
Lian Harper is the daughter of superhero Arsenal and the assassin Cheshire. She is killed in Justice League: Cry for Justice when Prometheus destroys Star City. Long after her death, Lian is resurrected in the DC Rebirth relaunch and depicted as Cheshire Cat, a thief and Catwoman's sidekick.

=== Lian Harper in other media ===
Lian Harper appears in Young Justice, voiced by Zehra Fazal.

== Harpi ==
Harpi (Angelika Bal) is an archaeologist and the wife of Adonis Bal. They were excavating the Temple of Medusa when a ruby they removed set off a trap that injured them both. Mento saved Angelika and Adonis' lives. The two are transformed into Harpi and Gorgon, respectively resembling their namesakes Harpy and Gorgon. Harpi and Gorgon go on to join Mento's group, Hybrid.

== Harpy ==
Harpy is the name of several characters appearing in American comic books published by DC Comics.

=== Satan Circle member ===
The second Harpy is a member of Satan Circle and the wife of Lucifer.

=== Iris Phelios ===
Iris Phelios is the girlfriend of Maxie Zeus and donned a winged costume to battle Batman in defense of Zeus. Iris Phelios first appeared in Batman #481 (July 1992) and was created by Doug Moench and Jim Aparo.

== Jay Harriman ==
Jay Harriman is a member of the Sons of Liberty. He and the Sons of Liberty try to assassinate Pete Ross, but Superman reveals the conspiracy to Agent Liberty who killed Harriman and his followers.

In "DC All In", the character is reintroduced as an anti-metahuman councilman and the father of Tyler Harriman.

== Hat ==
- First appearance: Action Comics #775 (February 2001)
- Created by: Joe Kelly, Doug Mahnke, Tom Nguyen

The Hat (Rampotatek) is a wannabe superhero in the DC Universe.

He is a Japanese member of the Elite who wields a hat powered by demonic magic. The team's violent actions lead them into conflict with Superman, during which they are stripped of their powers.

=== Hat in other media ===
- The Hat appears in Supergirl, portrayed by Louis Ozawa Changchien. This version is an alien whose namesake utilizes fifth-dimensional energy.
- The Hat appears in Superman vs. The Elite, voiced by Andrew Kishino.

== Hauhet ==
- First appearance: Future State: Justice League #1 (2021)
- Created by: Ram V & Marcio Takara
- Teams: Ogdoad; Doctor Fate (Khalid Nassour)
- Abilities: Hauhet's divine sphere of influence includes infinity, time, and eternity, allowing her to see through time and the multiverse and can bestow such powers to the Helm of Fate.

Hauhet is a fictionalized version of the Egyptian entity of the same name, appearing in American comic books published by DC Comics.

A contemporary of Nabu in association with Doctor Fate, she acts as the patron deity within the Helm of Fate to Khalid Nassour. She first appears in Future State: Justice League #1 within an alternate future parallel to the mainstream comic universe although she would later make her mainstream appearance in Justice League Dark Annual #2 (2022).

In the mainstream comic universe, Hauhet makes a brief appearance, the aforementioned event taking place years after; she is revealed to be the entity responsible for sending visions to Khalid Nassour, depicting the fall of the Tower of Fate through the machinations of Merlin and Arion. Upon further study, Khalid also learns that Merlin will bargain a deal with Jason Blood, in which will lead to him betraying Justice League Dark and himself despite insisting otherwise. She later arranges a meeting with Diana through Doctor Fate's ankhs, having Diana act as a messenger for the urgency of the situation and warning him and the Justice League Dark to not allow Merlin access to the Helm of Fate. Both Wonder Woman and Khalid are initially skeptical of her nature and intentions.

=== Other versions of Hauhet ===
An alternate timeline version of Hauhet appears in DC Future State.

== Head ==
- Further reading: Head at the Comic Book DB (archived from the original)

The Head is an alien in the DC Universe. The character, created by Gail Simone and Grant Morrison, first appeared in Brave New World #1, 2006.

Within the context of the stories, the Head is stranded on Earth after a failed plot by the microscopic alien race the Waiting to conquer it.

== Headhunter ==
Headhunter is the name of two characters in DC Comics.

=== Mercenary ===
The Headhunter is a mercenary and nemesis of Batman who is hired by criminal Vincent Morelli to kill Commissioner Gordon.

In the DC Rebirth relaunch, Headhunter is killed by Swamp Thing.

==== Moreland McShane ====
Another mercenary/serial killer called Headhunter (Moreland McShane) appeared in the Catwoman books. A former Marine, McShane is assigned to catch Catwoman by Gordon, but falls for her leading to her rejecting him once he knows her true identity. McShane is killed aboard Babylon Towers, leading Catwoman to report his body to the GCPD.

=== Hawkman villain ===
This Headhunter was a warrior shaman who used Nth Metal weapons. He developed a particular fascination with Hawkman, to the point of reanimating the bones of his previous incarnations.

=== Headhunter in other media ===
The mercenary incarnation of Headhunter appears in the fifth season of Gotham, portrayed by Kyle Terry. This version, also known as Wendell, temporarily replaced Victor Zsasz as Penguin's security counsel before Wendell was seemingly killed for his incompetence. He is later revealed to have survived after joining forces with Zsasz to fulfill a contract for Sofia Falcone in her gang war against the Penguin.

== Heatstroke ==
Heatstroke is a member of the Masters of Disaster who possesses pyrokinesis.

=== Heatstroke in other media ===
A genderbent incarnation of Heatstroke named Joe appears in Black Lightning, portrayed by Esteban Cueto. This version is an inmate who gained his powers through an A.S.A. experiment called "Project Masters of Disaster". While fighting Black Lightning and Thunder, Heatstroke is killed by Latavius "Lala" Johnson.

== William Heller ==
William "Billy" Heller is a character appearing in DC Comics. Created by John Ostrander and Luke McDonnell, the character first appeared in Suicide Squad vol. 1 #4 (August 1987) as William Hell and in Justice Society of America vol. 3 #2 (March 2007) as the White Dragon.

William Heller is a Neo-Nazi and white supremacist who formed the Aryan Empire. He poses as a vigilante in order to target minority criminals, but is exposed by Deadshot. Heller later returns as a member of the Fourth Reich before he's defeated by Hawkman. Heller conspires with Wade Eiling to overthrow Amanda Waller and kill the Suicide Squad, but he's killed by Plastique. Heller is shown to be alive in the Dawn of DC storyline, fighting Damage and Dyna-Mite.

== Hellhound ==
Hellhound is the name of three characters appearing in American comic books published by DC Comics.

=== Kai ===
Kai was the best student in the Armless Master's dojo in Gotham City. He later became a thief, mercenary, and enemy of Catwoman before being killed during a meeting of Gotham gang bosses.

=== Jack Chifford ===
The second Hellhound, Jack Chifford, is introduced in Villains United as a member of the Secret Society of Super Villains. During Salvation Run, he is killed and eaten by "lion-lizards" while stranded on Cygnus 4019.

=== Menagerie member ===
"The New 52" shows a version of Hellhound as a member of Cheetah's Menagerie.

=== Hellhound in other media ===
- Hellhound makes a non-speaking appearance in the Justice League Unlimited episode "Grudge Match" as a participant in Roulette's Meta-Brawl.
- Hellhound appears as a character summon in Scribblenauts Unmasked: A DC Comics Adventure.
- Hellhound appears in Batman: Bad Blood, voiced by Matthew Mercer.

== Inspector Henderson ==
Inspector Henderson is the name of two characters appearing in American comic books published by DC Comics.

=== William Henderson ===
A police detective who is variously depicted as a supporting character for first Superman, and later Black Lightning. Originally created for The Adventures of Superman, initially voiced by Matt Crowley and later by Earl George, Inspector William Henderson is Superman's police contact. He would later appear in Action Comics #442 by Elliot S! Maggin, Curt Swan and Bob Oksner. Following this, Henderson would make additional appearances in Black Lightning, in which he has a son who joined the 100 named Andrew, and John Byrne's 1986 Man of Steel miniseries before eventually becoming Metropolis' police commissioner. Additionally, a young Henderson who worked as a detective-sergeant and attempted to convince a young Superman, then known as Superboy, to move from Smallville to Metropolis appeared in The New Adventures of Superboy #6 (June 1980).

=== Mike Henderson ===
Inspector Mike Henderson appears in Supergirl (vol. 5) #37 (March 2009) as an African-American detective who heads the Metropolis Metacrimes Division.

=== Inspector Henderson in other media ===
- Inspector Henderson appears in Adventures of Superman, portrayed by Robert Shayne. This version is a friend of the Daily Planet staff and father of a teenage son named Ray (portrayed by Richard Shackleton) in addition to being a member of the Metropolis Police Department.
- Inspector Henderson appears in the Superman (1988) episode "Night of the Living Shadows".
- Inspector Henderson appears in the first season of Lois & Clark: The New Adventures of Superman, portrayed variously by Mel Winkler, Brent Jennings, and Richard Belzer.
- Inspector Henderson appears in the Superman: The Animated Series episode "Feeding Time", voiced by Mel Winkler. This version is the police commissioner of the Metropolis Police Department.
- Inspector Bill Henderson appears in Black Lightning, portrayed by Damon Gupton. This version is a police detective, later deputy chief and chief of police, of the Freeland Police Department and associate of Black Lightning and Thunder who is later killed by a Markovian soldier.

== John Henry ==
- First appearance: DC: The New Frontier #3 (May 2004)
- Created by: Darwyn Cooke
- Abilities: Uses sledgehammers
- Aliases: John Wilson

John Wilson, also known as John Henry, is a DC Comics superhero who appeared in DC: The New Frontier.

John Henry was a veteran of the Korean War whose family was killed by the Ku Klux Klan. Devastated by the events and blamed for the murders, John forged two iron sledgehammers, donned an executioner's hood, and became a vigilante before eventually being captured and killed.

In The New Golden Age, John Henry's history is integrated into the main timeline. One of his sledgehammers is found by an unnamed old man and given to a youth who takes the name John Henry Jr.

== John Henry Jr. ==
John Henry Jr. is a character appearing in American comic books published by DC Comics.

John Henry Irons has a great-uncle of the same name who was inspired by the vigilante John Henry after he was given one of John Henry's sledgehammers by a mysterious old man. After he brought the last of John Henry's murderers to justice, John Henry Jr. was kidnapped by the Time Masters when trying to look for the other sledgehammer that John Henry Jr. wielded. John Henry Jr. was among the 13 missing Golden Age superheroes that were returned to their own time when the pods they are in failed causing history to be rewritten around them.

However, John Henry Jr. ended up a prisoner of the Childminder. He and the other missing sidekicks are eventually rescued by Stargirl and transported to the present day. From there, he meets John Henry Irons and Natasha Irons.

== Heretic ==
Heretic (whose real name is Hafid al Ghul and also known as "Fatherless") is a character appearing in American comic books published by DC Comics debuting in Batman and Robin #12 (July 2010). He was created by Grant Morrison and David Finch.

Heretic is an operative of Leviathan who wears a steel bat-shaped mask and armor. He would later be revealed to be a genetically modified adult clone of Damian Wayne created by Talia al Ghul. He was additionally responsible for killing Damian in the Batman, Inc. comic and killing fellow Batman Inc. member Knight, not before Squire costs him an eye. Talia is furious at Heretic's decision to kill Damian without permission and in revenge beheads Heretic.

Later, Heretic returns under the title of "The Other", having claimed a League of Assassins Lazarus Pit from the previous owner. Heretic/Other destroys Titans Tower, kills Lady Vic, and hires Lobo to kidnap Damian. He is defeated by Robin and falls into a crevice.

=== Heretic in other media ===
- Heretic appears as a character summon in Scribblenauts Unmasked: A DC Comics Adventure.
- Heretic appears in Batman: Bad Blood, voiced by Travis Willingham. This version was part of a project established by Ra's al Ghul to create a worthy soldier for the League of Assassins, with the Mad Hatter programming his mind. Heretic is later killed by Talia al Ghul after a failed attempt to gain independence.

== Jinny Hex ==
- First appearance: Batman Giant #4 (December 2018)
- Created by: Brian Michael Bendis and Nick Derrington
- Abilities: Uses guns and inherited some of her grandfather's divine powers
- Aliases: Virginia Hex

Virginia "Jinny" Hex is a DC Comics superheroine. She is the granddaughter of Jonah Hex and a member of Young Justice. She first appeared in Batman Giant #4 (December 2018).

== Hindenburg ==
Hindenburg was a supervillain and member of the Superior Five. He was a sinister counterpart of Blimp of the Inferior Five. Together with his teammates, he was exiled on Salvation.

== Cecile Horton ==
Cecile Horton is the defense attorney for Barry Allen / The Flash for Professor Zoom's murder in "The Trial of the Flash" storyline. The character, created by Cary Bates and Carmine Infantino, first appeared in The Flash #332 (April 1984).

=== Cecile Horton in other media ===
A loose interpretation of Cecile Horton appears in The Flash, portrayed by Danielle Nicolet. This version is a defense attorney who goes on to enter a relationship with Joe West after helping solve metahuman crimes and helping Team Flash. Additionally, she gains the metahuman abilities of telepathy and telekinesis on several occasions (such as being possessed by Psycho-Pirate) before she utilizes on the Virtue identity as a superhero.

== Hourman ==
Hourman (also spelled Hour-Man) is the name of three different superheroes appearing in comics published by DC Comics. The original Hourman, Rex Tyler, was created by writer Ken Fitch and artist Bernard Baily and first appeared in Adventure Comics #48 (March 1940), during the Golden Age of Comic Books.

=== Rex Tyler ===
Rex Tyler, raised in upstate New York, is a scientist who develops an affinity for chemistry, particularly biochemistry. After graduating college, he lands a job researching vitamins and hormone supplements at Bannermain Chemical. A series of discoveries and accidents lead him to the "miraculous vitamin" Miraclo, which gives the user superhuman strength and vitality for one hour at a time. Feeling that Miraclo should be used for good purposes, Rex uses its powers to help those in need, becoming a superhero based in Appleton City and a founding member of the Justice Society of America. It is later revealed that Miraclo is addictive and that Rex is struggling with its effects.

In Zero Hour: Crisis in Time!, Hourman is killed by Extant, who causes him to age rapidly. He is resurrected after the Hourman android takes his place in the battle with Extant, enabling him to survive. Hourman retires from heroics and provides technical support for the JSA All-Stars, of whom his son Rick is a member.

=== Rick Tyler ===
Rick Tyler, Rex's son, becomes Hourman during Crisis on Infinite Earths, using some of his father's Miraclo pills to save people trapped in a burning hospital. After serving for a few years as a member of Infinity, Inc., Rick becomes addicted to Miraclo just as his father did. Amazo, posing as the android Hourman, cures him of his Miraclo addiction. Having conquered his personal demons, Rick joins the Justice Society.

=== Matthew Tyler ===
The Hourman android is an android from the 853rd century constructed by Tyler Chemorobotics who possesses the capability for human emotions. Rex Tyler, the original Hourman, spent some time in the future and was involved in its construction. Metron later appoints the android as his heir and entrusts him with the Worlogog, an ancient artifact containing a map of space and time.

During "DC One Million", the entity Solaris places a virus in Hourman's body that disables his time-traveling abilities, stranding Justice Legion Alpha in the past and the Justice League in the future. After overcoming the virus, Hourman creates a duplicate of Krypton and rescues its inhabitants from the past, creating the world of New Krypton in the 853rd century. Solaris' actions deeply affect Hourman, who travels to the present day and joins the Justice League. He damages the Worlogog and limits his own power to resemble his predecessors, giving him power for one hour at a time.

Hourman later joins the Justice Society of America and meets Rick Tyler, son and heir of the original Hourman. After leaving the group, Hourman gives Rick a tachyon-filled hourglass that can see the future and temporarily resurrects his father, who was killed during the Zero Hour: Crisis in Time! event.

In "The New Golden Age", the android Hourman is revealed to be the buyer who wanted to purchase the Lost Children, a group of kidnapped, time-displaced Golden Age sidekicks, from a Time Scavenger called Childminder. It is revealed that Hourman is working for an adult version of Corky Baxter called Time Master. After Hourman is reprogrammed and returns to his original self, he blasts Time Master into a time portal. Hourman brings the Lost Children to the present day, as returning them to their own times would cause a time paradox.

=== Hourman in other media ===
==== Television ====
- The Rick Tyler incarnation of Hourman makes non-speaking appearances in Justice League Unlimited as a member of the Justice League.
- The Rex Tyler incarnation of Hourman makes a cameo as a painting in Smallville.
- The Rex Tyler incarnation of Hourman appears in Batman: The Brave and the Bold, voiced by Lex Lang. This version is a member of the Justice Society of America.
- In November 2013, a live-action Hourman series was announced to have been in development at The CW. However, no progress was made after the announcement.
- The Rex Tyler incarnation of Hourman appears in Legends of Tomorrow, portrayed by Patrick J. Adams. This version is the leader of the Justice Society of America before he is killed by the Reverse-Flash.
- The Rex and Rick Tyler incarnations of Hourman appear in Stargirl, portrayed by Lou Ferrigno Jr. and Cameron Gellman respectively. These versions derive their powers from an hourglass amulet.

==== Film ====
- The Rex Tyler incarnation of Hourman makes a non-speaking appearance in the opening credits of Justice League: The New Frontier.
- An alternate universe version of Rex Tyler / Hourman appears in Justice Society: World War II, voiced by Matthew Mercer. This version hails from Earth-2 and is a founding member of the Justice Society of America, who were active during their Earth's version of the titular war.
- An Hourman film was announced to be in development in March 2021, with Gavin James and Neil Widener to write the screenplay and Chernin Entertainment producing the film along with Warner Bros. and DC Films.
- The Rex Tyler incarnation of Hourman makes a non-speaking appearance in Justice League: Crisis on Infinite Earths.

== Professor Hughes ==
Professor Hughes (first name unknown) is a professor at Midwestern University. Jay Garrick worked under him while performing experiments that eventually gave him super-speed.

In The New Golden Age, Hughes is reimagined as Doctor Elemental, a supervillain and member of the Injustice Society who wields element-manipulating armor. In a retcon to Flash Comics #1, Hughes is said to have engineered the unlikely "accident" that transformed Jay Garrick into the Flash, making him Flash's oldest villain. In addition, he was also revealed to have created Ro-Bear and founded S.T.A.R. Labs. In the present, Hughes resurfaces and joins Scandal Savage's Injustice Society.

== Human Cannonball ==
- Further reading: Human Cannonball at the Comic Book DB (archived from the original)

The Human Cannonball (Ryan Chase) is a superhero in the DC Universe. The character, created by Tom DeFalco and Win Mortimer, first appeared in Superman Family #188 (March 1978). Within the context of the stories, the Human Cannonball grew up in the circus and is a friend of Lois Lane. He has no superhuman powers, but can fly using an advanced jet-pack—he wears a cannonball-shaped helmet to allow him to crash into his targets head-on.

== Hyena ==
- Further reading: Hyena at the Comic Book DB (archived from the original)

The Hyena is the name of two supervillains appearing in media published by DC Comics. The first Hyena debuted in Firestorm #4 (September 1978) and was created by Gerry Conway and Al Milgrom. The second Hyena debuted in The Fury of Firestorm #10 (March 1983) and was created by Conway and Pat Broderick. Both are werehyenas who transform when under great emotional stress.

=== Summer Day ===
The first Hyena, Summer Day, is the sister of Doreen Day, a love interest of Firestorm. She joined the Peace Corps as a result of relational issues with her police officer father Bert and was turned into a werehyena after an accident in Africa. Taking the name Hyena, Summer returned to America and began attacking both criminals and police officers. A result of her condition is a steadily progressing madness.

In Infinite Crisis, Hyena joins the Secret Society of Super Villains. Deadshot kills Hyena after a prison breakout to serve as a message to the other villains to the leaders of the Secret Society of Super Villains.

Hyena is resurrected following The New 52 relaunch, which rebooted the continuity of the DC universe. This version of the character resembles a spotted hyena. In Forever Evil, Hyena appears as a member of Crime Syndicate of America's incarnation of the Secret Society of Super Villains.

=== Jivan Shi ===
The second Hyena, Jivan Shi, is a psychiatrist whom Summer Day had fallen in love with while he was attempting to treat her werehyena condition. One night, as Day and Shi were embracing, Day transformed and infected him with the werehyena curse.

Hyena appeared as a member of the Injustice League in "One Year Later".

During the "Salvation Run" storyline, Hyena is among the villains who are sent to the planet Cygnus 4019. He is later killed by Parademons.

Jivan Shi is reintroduced in the "Doomsday Clock" storyline, where he is stated to be a civilian psychologist working for the Department of Metahuman Affairs.

=== Hyena in other media ===
The Summer Day incarnation of Hyena makes a non-speaking appearance in the Creature Commandos episode "Chasing Squirrels" as an inmate of Belle Reve.
