= Flashpoint Beyond =

Limited comic book series published by DC Comics

- Cover of Flashpoint Beyond #0 (April 2022). Art by Dexter Soy and Alex Sinclair.

Publication information
- Publisher: DC Comics
- Schedule: Monthly
- Format: Limited series
- Genre: Mystery; Superhero
- Publication date: April 12, 2022 – October 18, 2022
- No. of issues: 7
- Main characters: Batman (Thomas Wayne); Super-Man; Gilda Dent; Joker (Martha Wayne); Batman (Bruce Wayne); Rip Hunter; Time Masters

Creative team
- Written by: Geoff Johns; Jeremy Adams; Tim Sheridan
- Artists: Eduardo Risso (issue #0); Xermánico; Mikel Janín
- Letterer: Rob Leigh
- Colorists: Trish Mulvihill; Romulo Fajardo Jr.; Jordie Bellaire

Flashpoint Beyond is an American comic book published by the publishing company DC Comics. The seven-issue limited series—written by Geoff Johns, Jeremy Adams and Tim Sheridan and illustrated by Eduardo Risso, Xermánico and Mikel Janín—began its monthly publication from April 12 to October 18, 2022. It is the sequel to the limited series Flashpoint (2011) by Johns and Andy Kubert. The series received critical acclaim from critics, with critics praising the writing, art, action, and characters. The series would later go on to set up the events of The New Golden Age.

== Premise ==
After helping Barry Allen—the speedster superhero The Flash—restore the timeline back to its original state, (Note: As depicted in Flashpoint (2011).) Thomas Wayne—the vigilante Batman—finds himself once again in the aberrant timeline known as the Flashpoint, whose existence Batman is determined to change and replace with another version of the DC Universe (DCU), all for the sole purpose of erasing the death of his son Bruce.

== Plot ==
Batman enlists Mime and Marionette (from Doomsday Clock) to sneak into the Time Masters' headquarters and steal a snowglobe that houses the Flashpoint timeline to save his father from being erased from existence. This causes Thomas Wayne to wake up in his reality where Penguin works for him, before heading to meet Harvey Dent, Harvey tells Thomas that his wife is obsessed with Martha Wayne - this reality's Joker. Thomas confronts this world's powerless Barry Allen, attempting to recreate the experiment that gave Barry his powers, but someone interferes, killing Barry. Moments later, Harvey Dent is killed by an assassin who destroys the car. Thomas saves Harvey's son Dexter before confronting and killing the assassin, who says Aquaman sent him to stop Barry Allen from becoming the Flash. Back on Earth Prime, Bruce is confronted by Corky Baxter, who warns him that Rip Hunter and the Time Masters will come after him.

A news report states that the Battle for Britain was lost and that the world's heroes have failed to stop the war between the Amazons and the Atlanteans, who are now entrenched in Britain. Aquaman interrupts the news broadcasts demanding that the humans withdraw from the oceans and turn over all nuclear weapons to Atlantis in 12 hours or everyone will drown starting with Britain. Back at Wayne Manor, Thomas introduces Dexter to Oswald and asks him to watch over Dexter while he attends to business outside of Gotham City. In Britain, Wonder Woman is a prisoner of the Atlanteans. After Wonder Woman attacks one of her guards, Batman arrives, dispatches them and then asks Wonder Woman for her Magic Lasso in exchange for the lives of her and her people. Wonder Woman gives in to the deal, and Batman uses it on Aquaman to get the answers on Allen and Dent's deaths. Aquaman says he did not send the assassin, as Oswald contacts Batman stating that somebody bombed their casino. As Aquaman prepares to use his trident to sink Britain, he is killed by Wonder Woman. Thomas returns home to find Oswald teaching Dexter how to wield a gun. Back on Prime Earth, Corky Baxter says it is not too late to undo this.

Thomas Wayne ponders three murders that occurred while he was in Britain, as the media dubs them the Clockwork Killer. When Oswald says Dexter has been asking him about explosives, Thomas advises Oswald to do just that. At the ruins of Wayne Casinos, Thomas is told by Commissioner Gigante that a clue has not been found yet. She does tell Thomas about an Arkham Asylum inmate named Psycho-Pirate who says that he came to 'hyper-time' to escape a "Dark Crisis" while ranting that Bruce Wayne is supposed to be Batman. Thomas goes to Arkham Asylum to confront Psycho-Pirate only to find him hanged in his cell. After seeing the writing on the wall, Batman walks down the hall when he gets the attention of Gilda Dent asking why he took her son noting that Batman is Thomas Wayne. Interrogating Gilda about Psycho-Pirate's death, Gilda claims she did not see the culprit before claiming that Thomas drove Martha mad the day when Bruce was killed. When Gilda starts to ramble that Thomas was a bad father, Batman punches the glass window of her cell, disfiguring the left side of her face. Later, Thomas dispatches some muggers, before being confronted by Super-Man. Back on Prime Earth, Corky Baxter notes that Batman stole the snowglobe from Rip Hunter and that the Time Masters took it from someone else first, warning Batman that the owner may come for it.

30 years ago, on the planet Krypton, a rocket carrying a baby Kal-El is shot into space in a space capsule, arriving on Earth and decimating Metropolis. Oswald is teaching Dexter how to work with explosives when they get a glimpse of a Flash-like figure who needs Thomas Wayne. Super-Man states to Batman that he needs help, though Batman rejects the offer, causing Super-Man to knock him out. Meanwhile, Batman wakes up in the presence of Poison Ivy who is working for Super-Man, along with Jason Woodrue/Swamp Thing, to build the Oasis. Batman is shown a message from Jor-El stating that Krypton is dying and that the Kryptonians need a new home before Krypton self-destructs - now planning to invade Earth in five days. Batman rejects Super-Man's plea for an alliance. Meanwhile, Eobard Thawne is dead, with the word Tick written nearby in blood. In Hypertime, two operatives find that a paradox has been reset and suspect Thawne to be responsible.

At Arkham Asylum, Gilda Dent has broken free from her restraints. Batman finds that Thawne has been found dead before performing an autopsy on the corpse. Meanwhile, Dexter finds his way into the Batcave and pulls out a costume from his backpack that he changes into. Thomas arrives home with the clock gears he found in Thawne's corpse and Oswald tells him that Dexter is gone, suspecting he went to visit his mother in Arkham Asylum. Thomas ignores him, stating that he is one step closer to finding the killer, and that the clock gears hold the clue. At Arkham, Dexter makes his way towards Gilda's cell. After putting together the clock, Thomas figures out its final, extra piece and why his grandfather clock has not been working. Dexter meets Gilda's ally, the Joker, who enters from a secret passage. Back on Prime Earth, the snow globe starts to crack, with Corky stating Batman does not know the truth about his mom.

Two days after the Dark Crisis, Batman finds Ra's al Ghul in Wayne Manor wanting to celebrate both their returns. He gives Batman the ashes of the alternate Thomas Wayne who was incinerated by Darkseid's Omega Beams and research from Rorschach's journal claiming that there's still time to save his father. At Arkham, Gilda starts to develop a second personality. Batman arrives to fight Joker while asking why she killed Barry Allen and Eobard Thawne. As Gilda departs with Dexter, Joker states that Psycho Pirate told her everything before killing him. Following her into her lair where she obtained a Time Sphere, Joker reveals her plans to save Bruce's life and make sure they are the ones who die. Back on Earth-Prime, Rip Hunter shows up to confront Batman. When Rip asks Bruce if he knows why he is here, Batman states that he will not let him interfere.

Rip states that imprisoning the Flashpoint timeline in a snowglobe will inevitably fail. Inside the Flashpoint, Batman shares a kiss with Joker and then turns her down. Gilda reappears with Dexter to force Joker into action so that Harvey becomes Two-Face. On Prime Earth, Batman and Rip Hunter clash as Batman states that he will not let him kill his father. In the Flashpoint, Joker talks about the loss, anger, and pain that have emerged in their reality, stating that this tragic world has shown how broken everything is as Joker again asks Batman's help. On Prime Earth, Rip states that he needs to release the Flashpoint timeline before it detonates and intertwines with Prime Earth. In the Flashpoint, Dexter asks Batman if he will die. Batman states to Dexter that he will not die as he never has lived. As Joker gets in to the Time Sphere, Batman lunges towards Gilda as the Time Sphere explodes. Joker shoots Gilda to keep her from killing Batman. Batman, Joker, and Dexter evacuate Arkham Asylum as it collapses. Back on Prime Earth, Rip notes that the snowglobe has stabilized and that Batman knew the Flashpoint version of his father would prove that the Flashpoint would be better without Bruce, citing the letter that his father had written to him. In the Flashpoint, Dexter has taken up the Robin mantle while Joker is in a special cell in the Batcave. Batman and Robin then head out to fight the invading Kryptonians with Joker offering to hook them up with anyone who has Kryptonite. As the Time Masters work on making Bruce pay for his transaction towards them, Corky states to his sister Bonnie that Bruce will have his hands full with his mother's family soon.

When Bonnie asks about the Thirteen, Rip states that the capsules have failed and that the Thirteen have been pulled back into history which is rebuilding around them. The Thirteen are revealed to be various individuals related to the Golden Age. Rip says that they should pray that they will reintegrate back into the 1940s without incident. When Bonnie asks about the Justice Society of America, Rip states that they will have to handle Per Degaton. In the Watchmen reality, a girl named Cleopatra Pak meets Bubastis as they fail to enter a building. Cleopatra, now under the alias of "Nostalgia", states that they will have to find the Watchman another way.

== Publication ==
The Flashpoint Beyond comic book limited series was written by Geoff Johns, Jeremy Adams and Tim Sheridan, while the illustrations were provided by Eduardo Risso (who drew only the zero issue of the comic book), Xermánico and Mikel Janín. It was also lettered by Rob Leigh and colored by Trish Mulvihill, Romulo Fajardo Jr. and Jordie Bellaire. Flashpoint Beyond was officially announced by DC Comics in January 2022 as the sequel to the limited series Flashpoint (2011), which was originally written by Johns and drawn by Andy Kubert. Comprising seven issues released by DC at monthly intervals, Flashpoint Beyond began publishing on April 12 and ended on October 18 of the same year.

=== Issues ===
Issue	Title	Publication date	Ref.
#0	"The Clockwork Killer: Prologue"	April 12, 2022	
#1	"The Clockwork Killer: Chapter One"	May 3, 2022	
#2	"The Clockwork Killer: Chapter Two: Gilda the Good Witch"	June 7, 2022	
#3	"The Clockwork Killer: Chapter Three: The Secret of the Super-Man"	July 5, 2022	
#4	"The Clockwork Killer: Chapter Four: The Other Side of the Wall"	August 2, 2022	
#5	"The Clockwork Killer: Chapter Five: The Joke's on Me"	September 6, 2022	
#6	"The Clockwork Killer: Chapter Six: The Th13teen Club"	October 18, 2022	

=== Collected Editions ===
- Flashpoint Beyond (collects Flashpoint Beyond #0-6, 280 pages, softcover, December 13, 2022, ISBN 9781779517371)

== Reception ==
According to Comic Book Roundup, Flashpoint Beyond received an average score of 8.1 out of 10. Reviewing Flashpoint Beyond, Sam Stone of Comic Book Resources stated: "Flashpoint Beyond picks up and remixes where the original miniseries left off, exploring a version of the story where The Flash never swooped in to save the day. The creative team is firing on all cylinders as they explore this dark twist on the DCU from the perspective of its Batman".

== Future ==
In April 2022, Johns said that the sixth and final issue of Flashpoint Beyond would serve as the basis for the creation of several new DC titles: "There will be books and stories that spin out of [Flashpoint Beyond] into the greater DCU, some of them featuring characters that haven't been at the forefront for quite a while that I'm excited to see. But it'll do it in a very focused way on this side of history and time. But it is a storyline that is going to explore hopefully a different facet of the DCU that we haven't seen for a while".

Flashpoint Beyond leads into The New Golden Age, with a new Justice Society of America series and a Stargirl miniseries springing from it, both written by Johns.
