= Dian Belmont =

- Dian from Sandman Mystery Theatre. Art by Guy Davis.

Publication information
- Publisher: DC Comics
- First appearance: Adventure Comics #47 (February 1940)
- Created by: Gardner Fox; Ogden Whitney

In-story information
- Team affiliations: Justice Society of America
- Supporting character of: Sandman
- Notable aliases: Sandy the Golden Girl; Woman in Evening Clothes

Dian Belmont is a fictional DC Comics character, associated with the Golden Age Sandman. A socialite and amateur detective, she assisted Sandman on most of his adventures as his aide and confidant. She made her first appearance in Adventure Comics #47 (February 1940), created by Gardner Fox and Ogden Whitney.

== Fictional character biography ==
Dian from her first appearance in her "Woman in Evening Clothes" guise. Art by Ogden Whitney.

=== Pre-Crisis ===
In Dian Belmont's first adventure she was originally a thief named the Woman in Evening Clothes whom Sandman foiled a robbery by. After a few more stories, her past as a gentlewoman thief was entirely forgotten; she became the rich socialite girlfriend of Wesley Dodds and a fellow detective in his guise as Sandman, with her father being district attorney Lawrence Belmont. A distinction between Dian and most other superhero girlfriends was that Dian was fully aware of Wesley's Sandman identity and was a constant aid in his war on crime and less a damsel in distress. In Adventure Comics #69 (December 1941), Sandman was given a new look and sidekick in Sandy the Golden Boy. Dian disappeared from the strip and did not reappear for several decades, until it was explained that Sandy was her nephew and that she had died sometime before the Second World War.

In All-Star Squadron #18 (dated February 1983, but set on Earth-Two in the early 1940s), writer Roy Thomas explained Dian's disappearance from the series by having Nazi spies murder her after mistaking her for the Sandman. She had donned the Sandman's gas mask costume and was investigating a suspicious fire while Wesley Dodds was out of town.

=== Post-Crisis/Sandman Mystery Theatre ===
Starting in Sandman Mystery Theatre, Dian Belmont's history is altered. Her relationship with Wesley is now modeled on that of Nick and Nora Charles in The Thin Man: they have a more lighthearted rapport but a much more mature view of their personal relationship. Dian's father is the District Attorney and she is now seen as a flighty party girl who after an encounter with the Sandman joins in his fight against crime. In later adventures Dian jokingly refers to herself as Sandy due to a comic that she read about a fictionalized version of herself and Wesley (itself based on the Golden Age adventures of Sandman and Sandy). In her twilight years, Dian Belmont became an award-winning crime novelist and attracted such high profile fans as Jack Knight, also known as Starman, helping him solve one of his crimes. Dian died of natural causes and was joined by Wesley soon after.

=== The New Golden Age ===
In "The New Golden Age", a flashback to the summer of 1940 has Dian Belmont wishing Wesley good luck in his meeting with Colonel Breckinridge. During the reception of Wheeler Vanderlyle, Wesley sits with Dian and Lawrence. She learns from Wesley that the proposal for the use of sleeping gas on enemy soldiers fell through. Dian tells him that he can try this proposal with other colonels. Dian is shown to work as a secretary of Wheeler Vanderlyle as she learns from Wesley that some of his private possessions have been stolen. Sandman later brings up his findings on what happened at Dodds Mansion to Dian Belmont and Wheeler Vanderlyle. When Dodds is exposed to one of his gases when fighting a villain that he dubbed Fog, Leslie Humphries finds Dodds' body and brings him to Wheeler Vanderlyle's penthouse to recuperate as Dian visits him. She is told about the attack and the plans to make more poison gases. Dian suspects that someone had Igor Kluge murdered and framed for the break-in. She later comes in after Wesley saves Wheeler from Fog, which resulted in Fog falling out the window to his death on the streets below. After she and Wesley are interviewed by the detectives about Fog's attack on Wheeler Vanderlyle's penthouse and him falling out the window, Dian also advises them to talk to her father if new developments come up from the crime scene. When Wheeler Vanderlyle is revealed to be the culprit of the theft of Wesley's journal and he was badly hurting Sandman, Dian shoots him in self-defense. As Wesley's mansion is being rebuilt, Dian visits him and introduces Wesley to her nephew Sandy Hawkins, as Leslie Humphries informs him that there are some people in the backyard that want to meet him.
