= Allen Bert Christman =

American cartoonist

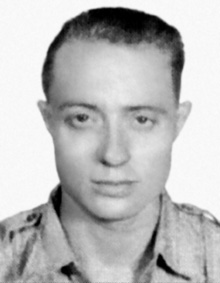
- Born: May 31, 1915 Fort Collins, Colorado, United States
- Died: January 23, 1942 (aged 26) Burma Road, Burma
- Notable works: Scorchy Smith; Sandman

Allen Bert Christman (May 31, 1915 – January 23, 1942) was an American cartoonist and naval aviator. He is best known as artist of the newspaper comic strip Scorchy Smith, about a pilot-adventurer in the inter-war years. He was also credited with co-creating the original, Wesley Dodds version of the DC Comics character the Sandman.

== Biography ==
Artist Bert Christman and writer Gardner Fox are generally credited as having co-created the original Wesley Dodd version of the DC Comics character the Sandman. While the character's first appearance is usually given as Adventure Comics #40 (cover-dated July 1939), he also appeared in DC Comics' 1939 New York World's Fair Comics omnibus, which historians believe appeared on newsstands one to two weeks earlier, while also believing the Adventure Comics story was written and drawn first. Each of the two stories' scripts were credited to the pseudonym "Larry Dean"; Fox wrote the untitled, 10-page story in New York World's Fair #1, while he simply plotted, and Christman scripted, the untitled, six-page story, generally known as "The Tarantula Strikes", in Adventure #40. Creig Flessel, who drew many early Sandman adventures, has sometimes been credited as co-creator on the basis of drawing the Sandman cover of Adventure #40, but no other evidence has surfaced.

Christman gave up his career as an artist, and joined the U.S. Navy in June 1938 as a pilot cadet. He was serving on the aircraft carrier Ranger in 1941 when he was recruited to join the American Volunteer Group to fight the invading Japanese in the skies over China and Burma. The AVG was later famous as the “Flying Tigers.”

During his time with the Tigers, Christman made many friends by using his artistic talents to personalize the noses of the P-40Bs of the “Panda Bear” squadron of the AVG with cartoons and caricatures for the pilots.

In 1942, Christman's plane was shot down and he was killed while parachuting by the Japanese Army Air Force while flying in defense of the Burma Road. He was buried with the full military honors due to being a colonel in the Chinese Air Force.

Bert Christman's grave is located in Grandview Cemetery, Fort Collins, Colorado.
