= Sandman (Wesley Dodds) =

Fictional DC Comics character

- Wesley Dodds as Sandman as appeared on the cover of Adventure Comics #51 (June 1940). Art by Creig Flessel

Publication information
- Publisher: DC Comics/Vertigo
- First appearance: New York World's Fair Comics #1 (April 1939)
- Created by: Gardner Fox (writer); Bert Christman (artist)

In-story information
- Full name: Wesley Bernard "Wes" Dodds
- Species: Metahuman
- Team affiliations: All-Star Squadron; Justice Society of America; Black Lantern Corps
- Notable aliases: Grainy Gladiator; Wes Dodds
- Abilities: Prophetic dreams; Expert chemist and inventor; Expert hand-to-hand combatant, athlete, and marksman; Skilled detective; Use of gas mask and gas gun

The Sandman (Wesley Bernard "Wes" Dodds) is a superhero appearing in American comic books published by DC Comics. The first of several DC characters to bear the name Sandman, he was created by writer Gardner Fox and artist Allen Bert Christman. Attired in a green business suit, fedora, and World War I gas mask, the Sandman used a gun emitting a sleeping gas to sedate criminals. He was originally one of the "mystery men" to appear in comic books and other types of adventure fiction in the 1930s, but later was outfitted with a unitard/cowl costume and developed into a proper superhero, acquiring a sidekick, Sandy, and founding the Justice Society of America (JSA).

Like most DC Golden Age superheroes, the Sandman fell into obscurity in the 1940s and eventually other DC characters took his name. During the 1990s, when writer Neil Gaiman's Sandman (featuring Morpheus, the anthropomorphic embodiment of dreams) was popular, DC revived Dodds in Sandman Mystery Theatre, a pulp/noir series set in the 1930s. Wizard Magazine ranked Wesley Dodds among the Top 200 Comic Book Characters of All Time, and he is the oldest superhero in terms of continuity to appear on the list.

== Publication history ==
=== Golden Age of comic books ===
Artist Bert Christman and writer Gardner Fox are generally credited as co-creating the original, Wesley Dodds version of the DC Comics character the Sandman. While the character's first appearance is usually given as Adventure Comics #40 (cover-dated July 1939), he also appeared in DC Comics' 1939 New York World's Fair Comics omnibus, which historians believe appeared on newsstands one to two weeks earlier, while also believing the Adventure Comics story was written and drawn first. Each of the two stories' scripts were credited to the pseudonym "Larry Dean"; Fox wrote the untitled, 10-page story in New York World's Fair #1, while he simply plotted, and Christman scripted, the untitled, six-page story, generally known as "The Tarantula Strikes", in Adventure #40. Creig Flessel, who drew many early Sandman adventures, has sometimes been credited as co-creator on the basis of drawing the Sandman cover of Adventure #40, but no other evidence has surfaced.

Following these two first appearances, the feature "The Sandman" continued to appear in the anthology Adventure Comics through #102 (February–March 1946). One of the medium's seminal "mystery men", as referred to at the time, the Sandman straddled the pulp magazine detective tradition and the emerging superhero tradition by dint of his dual identity and his fanciful, masked attire and weapon: an exotic "gas gun" that could compel villains to tell the truth, as well as put them to sleep. Unlike many superheroes, he frequently found himself the victim of gunshot wounds, both in the Golden Age and in stories in DC's modern-day Vertigo imprint, and he would continue fighting in spite of his injuries.

In his early career, Dodds (the character's surname was given as "Dodd" in his first four appearances; he became "Dodds" in Adventure Comics #44) was frequently aided by his girlfriend, Dian Belmont, who is aware of his dual identity. Unlike many superhero love interests, Belmont was often, though not always, portrayed as an equal partner of the Sandman, rather than a damsel in distress. Later stories would reveal that the two remained together for the duration of their lives, though they never married.

The Sandman was one of the original members of the Justice Society of America when that superhero team was introduced in All Star Comics #3, published by All-American Comics, one of the companies that would merge to form DC.

In Adventure Comics #69 (December 1941), Dodds was given a yellow-and-purple costume by writer Mort Weisinger and artist Paul Norris, as well as a yellow-clad kid sidekick, Sandy the Golden Boy, nephew of Dian Belmont. Later that year, the celebrated team of Joe Simon and Jack Kirby took over this version of the character. In 1942, Dodds enlisted in the U.S. Army and served as an anti-aircraft gunner during World War II.

=== Silver Age to Modern Age ===
Reintroduced in the Silver Age in Justice League of America #46 (July 1966), the Sandman made occasional appearances in the annual teamups between that superhero group and the JSA.

In 1981 DC began publishing All-Star Squadron, a retelling of the Earth-Two mystery-men during WWII. Although not a main character, Sandman does appear in its pages. Of note is issue #18 which gives an explanation of why Dodds changed costumes from the cloak and gas mask to the yellow-and-purple outfit; Dian wore his costume while he was fighting elsewhere and she was killed in a fray. Dodds decided to wear the new costume, of Dian's design, until he could bring himself to wear the original in which she had died.

Later, this explanation would be changed again when Dian Belmont was retconned to have never died, and a new explanation was given: Sandy convinced Dodds to switch to the more colorful costume to gain the support of regular people, who preferred the more traditional superhero look to his older, pulp-themed costume.

An acclaimed film noir-inspired retelling of the original Sandman's adventures, Sandman Mystery Theatre, ran from 1993 to 1998 under DC Comics' Vertigo mature-reader imprint. Although as a whole its continuity within the DC Universe is debatable, several elements of the series – the more nuanced relationship between Dodds and Dian Belmont; the Sandman's appearance (wearing a trench coat and World War I gas mask instead of the cape and the custom-made gas mask); and Dodds' pudgier appearance and wearing of glasses – have been adopted into regular continuity. The series ran for 70 issues and 1 annual.

In Sandman Midnight Theatre (1995) a one-shot special by Neil Gaiman (author of the Modern Age supernatural series The Sandman), Matt Wagner (co-author of Sandman Mystery Theatre), and Teddy Kristiansen, depicts an interaction between the two characters, with the original visiting Great Britain and encountering the imprisoned Dream, the protagonist of Gaiman's series. It is suggested that Dodds' prophetic dreams come from Dream's domain, the Dreaming.

=== Twilight years ===
Dodds is one of a number of Justice Society members who find themselves in the "Ragnarok Dimension" during the early Modern Age of Comic Books. The Last Days of the Justice Society of America Special (1986) wrote the post-Crisis tale of a time-warped wave of destruction ready to engulf the world. Dodds and his JSA teammates enter into a limbo to engage in an eternal battle that would allow the universe to continue its existence. This was later revealed to be a simulation created by Odin, which he intended to give to Dream as a bribe. Dodds, Dream's protege, and Hawkman, the grandfather of Dream's appointed successor are the only JSA members who were seen at that time. This lasted only until 1992 when DC published Armageddon: Inferno. This mini-series ended with the JSA members leaving limbo and entering the 'real' world. Justice Society of America (1992–1993) showed how the JSA members handled returning to normal life. For the Sandman, the series depicted him as an old, thin man with a balding scalp and a sharp wit. Starting with issue #1 his physical condition became important as writer Len Strazewski had him suffer a stroke at the first sign of a villainous attack. Both his age and his physical limitations became a theme writers would use in this character's post-Crisis stories.

During Zero Hour: Crisis in Time!, Dodds is returned to his proper age by Extant. Later, Wesley Dodds is shown as retired and living with Dian Belmont though occasionally coming out of it, most notably in a team-up with Jack Knight, the son of Dodds' JSA teammate Starman. When Dian is diagnosed with a terminal disease, the two travel the world together until her death.

Towards the end of his life, Dodds' prophetic dreams alert him to the identity and location of the new Doctor Fate, prompting him to contact the Gray Man, a being created from the residue of others' dreams, as well as his old friend Speed Saunders to instruct them to warn his former teammates about what he has discovered. Waiting on a clifftop, he is subsequently confronted by the powerful villain Mordru, who intends to force Dodds to tell him the identity of the new Doctor Fate, only for Dodds to distract Mordru with his gas-gun long enough to commit suicide by jumping off the cliff rather than allow Mordru to torture him into submission. Dodd's sidekick Sandy the Golden Boy becomes known simply as Sand and joins the Justice Society.

Dodds has largely remained dead since. However, he is temporarily resurrected as a Black Lantern in "Blackest Night" and as a zombie in "Knight Terrors".

=== Dawn of DC ===
In 2023, Dodds received a self-titled miniseries as part of "The New Golden Age" titled Wesley Dodds: The Sandman, which explored his adventures during the 1940s where he contended with theft from his house, a doppelganger killer named Fog, and the betrayal of his friend Wheeler Vanderlyle. After Vanderlyle is shot by Dian Belmont, Dodds oversaw the reconstruction of his mansion and met Dian's nephew Sandy Hawkins. He would later join the Justice Society.

When a girl calling herself Kid Eternity follows Wildcat into the afterlife after he had been killed by Lady Eve, Sandman is among the dead JSA members who tell Kid Eternity that the JSA is in danger and that they will need her help.

== Powers and abilities ==
Dodds has prophetic dreams which come to him as cryptic, ambiguous visions of crimes. Originally of unexplained origin, these dreams were later ascribed to an encounter between Dodds and the entity known as Dream via retcon. The visions haunt Dodds, who uses his keen intellect and amateur detective skills to properly interpret them. He is also a talented chemist and inventor, creating the sand-like substance and the Silicoid Gun ultimately responsible for transforming Sandy the Golden Boy into a silicon-based life-form. In the early years of his career, Wesley Dodds possesses the strength level of a man who engages in regular exercise, and was a fine hand-to-hand combatant. As he grows older, his strength level diminishes in relative proportion to his age. As hobbies, Dodds enjoys reading, writing, poetry, origami and philosophy. Through an unknown process, Dodds passes his power of prophetic visions on to his former ward Sandy Hawkins upon the moment of his own death.

=== Equipment ===
Wesley Dodds' costume consists of a basic green business suit, fedora, a World War I era gas mask, a gas gun, and a specially designed "wirepoon" gun, which fires a length of thin, steel cable. The gas mask protects Dodds from the effects of the gas emitted from his gas gun. The gas gun, a handheld device fitted with cartridges containing concentrated sleeping gas, is Wesley Dodds' only known weapon. Pressing the trigger on the gun releases a cloud of green dust rendering all within the Sandman's immediate vicinity unconscious. An upgraded canister dispenser for the gun is provided for him by his close friend and confidant Lee Travis. Dodds is also known to conceal smaller knockout gas capsules in a hollow heel on his shoe. These prove ideal when placed in situations where his gas gun is not readily available.

In the early days of his career, the Sandman drives a black 1938 Plymouth coupe. The car is enhanced with various features to aid Dodds in his crusade against crime.

== Enemies ==
Sandman has an assortment of enemies that he fought:

- Butcher - A cannibalistic butcher.
- Doctor Death - Raymond Kessler is a serial killer/swindler who is the boyfriend of Dian Belmont's cousin Lucy.
- Phantom of the Fair - Gerald Zimmerman is a man who has been torturing and killing homosexual men at the New York World's Fair.
- Ramulus - A plant-manipulating villain who was also known as Nightshade and Plant Master. He later appeared as a member of the Monster Society of Evil.
- Scorpion - Terrence Pritchard is an ad executive who becomes a bullwhip-wielding vigilante.
- Tarantula - A man who targeted Vivian Dale. There was also a second Tarantula that Sandman fought. This one was Roger Goldman who is a serial killer and the former owner of the Evergood Milk Bottling Company.

== Other versions ==
=== Earth 2 ===
In The New 52 (a reboot of DC Comics), a new Earth-2 version of Sandman appears. When Washington DC is attacked by Solomon Grundy, Dodds and the Sandmen paramilitary force are sent to retrieve and save President Lightfoot. They are later assigned by Commander Khan to infiltrate Terry Sloane's secret facility, where they confront and subdue a mind-controlled Michael Holt.

=== Earth 40 ===
On Earth 40, Wesley Dodds meets with The Unholy Three to give information about the Trigger, a device that causes every nuclear reactor in the world to detonate in a nuclear explosion. The Sandman arranges for The Unholy Three to meet with The Lantern, who has information on where the Trigger is located.

=== Kingdom Come ===
Dodds appears as an infirm old man at the beginning of Kingdom Come, plagued with visions of the impending apocalyptic battle between various factions of metahumans. Before his death, he relates his visions, interpreted through passages from the Book of Revelation, to his friend Norman McCay.

== In other media ==
=== Television ===
- Wesley Dodds / Sandman appears in the Smallville episode "Absolute Justice", portrayed by Ken Lawson. This version was a member of the Justice Society of America (JSA) before the group was disbanded in the 1970s. In the present, Dodds is ambushed and killed by Icicle as part of a targeted attack on the JSA.
- Wesley Dodds / Sandman makes a non-speaking appearance in the Batman: The Brave and the Bold episode "Crisis: 22,300 Miles Above Earth!" as a member of the JSA.
- Wesley Dodds / Sandman makes a non-speaking cameo appearance in a flashback in the Young Justice episode "Humanity" as a member of the JSA.
- Wesley Dodds / Sandman makes a non-speaking cameo appearance in the Stargirl pilot episode as a member of the JSA.

=== Film ===
- Wesley Dodds / Sandman appears in Justice League: The Flashpoint Paradox.
- Wesley Dodds / Sandman makes a cameo appearance in Superman via a mural at the Hall of Justice.

=== Audio drama ===
Wesley Dodds appears in the Kingdom Come audio drama, voiced by Garrick Hagon.

== Collected editions ==
- The Golden Age Sandman Archive Vol. 1 (Sandman stories from New York World's Fair Comics #1–2 and Adventure Comics #40–59) by Gardner Fox, Bert Christman and others.
- Sandman by Joe Simon and Jack Kirby (World's Finest #6–7; Adventure Comics #72–102; Sandman #1)
- Sandman Mystery Theatre Book 1: The Tarantula (Sandman Mystery Theatre #1–4)
- Sandman Mystery Theatre Book 2: The Face and The Brute (Sandman Mystery Theatre #5–12)
- Sandman Mystery Theatre Book 3: The Vamp (Sandman Mystery Theatre #13–16)
- Sandman Mystery Theatre Book 4: The Scorpion (Sandman Mystery Theatre #17–20)
- Sandman Mystery Theatre Book 5: Dr. Death and The Night of the Butcher (Sandman Mystery Theatre #21–28)
- Sandman Mystery Theatre Book 6: The Hourman and The Python (Sandman Mystery Theatre #29–36)
- Sandman Mystery Theatre Book 7: The Mist and The Phantom of the Fair (Sandman Mystery Theatre #37–44)
- Sandman Mystery Theatre Book 8: The Blackhawk and The Return of the Scarlet Ghost (Sandman Mystery Theatre #45–52)
- Sandman Mystery Theatre: Sleep of Reason (Sandman Mystery Theatre: Sleep of Reason #1–5)
- Wesley Dodds: The Sandman (Wesley Dodds: The Sandman #1-6)
