= Jade (DC Comics) =

Fictional character, a superheroine in the DC Comics Universe

- Jade as depicted in a variant cover of JSA #1 (2024). Art by Fico Ossio.

Publication information
- Publisher: DC Comics
- First appearance: All-Star Squadron #25 (September 1983)
- Created by: Roy Thomas (writer); Jerry Ordway (artist)

In-story information
- Alter ego: Jennifer-Lynn Hayden
- Species: Metahuman
- Place of origin: Earth
- Team affiliations: Outsiders; Infinity, Inc.; Justice League; Justice Society of America; Blood Pack; Green Lantern Corps; Black Lantern Corps; White Lantern Corps
- Notable aliases: Green Lantern; Jennie-Lynn; Jen; Jade Scott; Nicki Jones
- Abilities: Via Starheart: Energy manipulation; EM spectrum control; Gravity control; Telepathy; Psychic amplification; Magical empowerment; Hypnotism; Astral projection; Intangibility; Invisibility; Chlorokinesis; Via Green Power Ring: Flight; Force field generation; Interstellar travel; Space survivability; Generation and control of green hard-light constructs into any shape or form; Real-time translation of all languages

Jade (Jennifer-Lynn Hayden) is a superhero appearing in American comic books published by DC Comics. She first appeared in All-Star Squadron #25 in September 1983, created by Roy Thomas and Jerry Ordway. Since the character's creation, she has appeared as a reoccurring member in both Green Lantern and Justice Society of America titles.

As one of the fraternal twin children (the other being Obsidian) of Alan Scott and Rose Canton, she was raised in an adoptive home but awakens her powers shortly into adulthood. Reuniting with her long-lost brother, she became a superhero and learns of her biological parents. The character would serve as a prominent member of Infinity Inc, the Outsiders, and the Green Lantern Corps alongside Kyle Rayner as a love interest. Subjected to a comic book death during the Rann-Thanagar War limited series, she is revived during Blackest Night and served as a member of the Justice League of America. Within DC Rebirth onward, the character reappears with much of her history intact and serves as a member of the Justice Society of America, wherein she serves as the interim chairwoman of the team.

Jade appeared in the second and third season of Stargirl on The CW network, portrayed by Ysa Penarejo.

== Creation ==
Thomas spoke on the genesis of the character, stating:

Dann and I decided that Alan Scott, a.k.a. Green Lantern, would have two kids in the new group--twins, no less. Coming up with Jade was the easy part: we loved (and figured our pubescent male readers would drool over) the idea of a green-skinned girl, who possessed from birth the powers her father gained only by slipping on a magic ring which had obviously affected his genes.

== Fictional character biography ==
Jade is the daughter of Alan Scott / Green Lantern and the villain Rose Canton / Thorn and fraternal twin sister of Todd Rice / Obsidian. Thorn fears that she will harm her children, so she gives them up for adoption, with Jade being adopted by a couple in Milwaukee. After reuniting as teenagers, Jade and Obsidian become superheroes and founding members of Infinity, Inc.

As a civilian, Jade becomes a model, photographer, and roommate and girlfriend of Kyle Rayner. After she loses her powers in a battle with Starheart, Kyle gives her a spare Green Lantern power ring. After becoming Ion, Kyle restores Jade's powers, with John Stewart gaining her ring. Jade later breaks up with Kyle and becomes the leader of the Outsiders.

In Rann–Thanagar War, Jade is killed while trying to prevent Alexander Luthor Jr. from recreating the multiverse. Her Starheart power is transferred to Kyle Rayner, causing him to become Ion a second time.

=== Blackest Night ===
Jade as a Black Lantern, menacing her former love, art by Patrick Gleason.

During the 2009–2010 Blackest Night storyline, Jade is resurrected as a member of the Black Lantern Corps. Jade, a soulless undead being, uses Kyle's affection for her against him, claiming that his love for her had brought her back. However, Kyle recognizes her lies after witnessing the attack of the Black Lantern Corps on the planet Oa. Jade captures Kyle and torments him with black energy constructs of Alexandra DeWitt, Donna Troy, his mother Moira, and herself. The battle between Jade and Kyle is ended by Soranik Natu, who activates Jade's ring.

The Black Lanterns are ordered to devour Oa's Central Power Battery. Mogo causes all of the Black Lanterns, including Jade, to be absorbed into the core of Oa. The Black Lanterns are continuously burned with magma, preventing them from regenerating their bodies.

During the finale of Blackest Night, Jade and several of the Black Lanterns are resurrected by the Life Entity in their true forms. Jade and Kyle resume their relationship.

=== The New 52 ===
Jade and the Justice Society are not present in The New 52 continuity reboot. In Doomsday Clock, this is revealed to be the result of Doctor Manhattan altering the timeline. The Justice Society is brought back after Superman convinces Manhattan to restore the timeline.

== Powers and abilities ==
Jade inherited the power to manipulate and generate emerald energies similar to the Starheart-powered energies also utilized by the original Green Lantern's ring. Unlike her father's ring, her energies are self-renewing and allows for powers such as flight. She also possess the power to control plants and photosynthesis. After temporarily losing her powers, she wielded a Green Lantern ring to compensate.

== Other versions ==
The new Jade, Nicki Jones, is introduced, art by Chris Batista.

- An unrelated Jade, Nicki Jones, appears in 52. She is a graphic arts student from the San Francisco Art Institute and a member of Lex Luthor's Infinity, Inc. who possesses similar powers to the original Jade.
- An alternate universe version of Jade from Earth-22 appears in Kingdom Come.
- An alternate universe version of Jade from Earth-9 appears in the Tangent Comics universe. This version is an Asian operative of Meridian with dragon tattoos that she can bring to life.
- An alternate universe version of Jade appears in Ame-Comi Girls. This version is Jade Yifei, a Chinese teenager and the daughter of a National People's Congress official who was blinded at a young age. During an attack on her family, Jade is chosen by a Green Lantern power ring, which partially restores her vision.

== Reception ==
She was ranked 34th in Comics Buyer's Guide's "100 Sexiest Women in Comics" list.

== In other media ==
=== Television ===
Jennie-Lynn Hayden appears in Stargirl, portrayed by Ysa Penarejo. Introduced in the second season, she breaks into Courtney Whitmore's home to retrieve Alan Scott's lantern, only to be attacked by Courtney. After Jennie introduces herself to Courtney and the latter's family, Courtney becomes skeptical of Jennie's intentions, believing she is a mole for the Injustice Society. As Pat Dugan trains Jennie to control her powers, which initially appear to be connected to Scott's lantern, Courtney eventually apologizes. After feeling isolated and emotional over her missing brother Todd Rice, Jennie breaks the lantern and strengthens her powers, after which Dugan theorizes Jennie herself is the source. Jennie leaves to find Rice, though Courtney and Dugan later recruit her to help them fight Eclipso. In the third season, Jennie receives Sandy Hawkins' help in finding Rice and helps him control his powers after discovering they are connected to hers.

=== Film ===
An alternate universe version of Jade from Earth-2 makes a non-speaking cameo appearance in Justice League: Crisis on Infinite Earths. This version is a member of the Justice Society of America.

=== Video games ===
Jade appears as a character summon in Scribblenauts Unmasked: A DC Comics Adventure.

=== Miscellaneous ===
- Jade appears in Justice League Adventures #20.
- Jade appears in Legion of Super Heroes in the 31st Century #6 as a member of the Green Lantern Corps.
