= Obsidian (character) =

DC Comics superhero

- Obsidian as depicted in Infinity Inc. #6; art by Mike Machlan.

Publication information
- Publisher: DC Comics
- First appearance: All-Star Squadron #25 (September 1983)
- Created by: Roy Thomas (writer); Jerry Ordway (artist)

In-story information
- Full name: Todd James Rice
- Species: Metahuman
- Team affiliations: Justice Society of America; Justice League America; Infinity, Inc.; Justice League
- Partnerships: Ian Karkull; Eclipso; Mordru
- Abilities: Can merge with his own shadow, giving him enhanced physical strength and vitality; Flight; Intangibility; Invisibility; Phasing; Shadow manipulation; Shadow absorption; Shadow creature control; Shadow construct creation; Shadow possession; Envelop enemies, showing them their dark side; Ability to enlarge himself and cover areas in pure shadow/darkness from a vast distance

Obsidian (Todd James Rice) is a superhero published by DC Comics. He first appeared in All-Star Squadron #25 (September 1983), and was created by Roy Thomas and Jerry Ordway. He is the son of Alan Scott and Rose Canton and the twin brother of Jade. According to an Infinity, Inc. letter page, Obsidian was named "Todd" after a friend of Thomas.

Obsidian made his first live-action appearance on the second season of the DC show Legends of Tomorrow, with a younger version of the character portrayed by Dan Payne, with no speaking lines, and an older version portrayed by Lance Henriksen. Rice also appears in the third season of Stargirl on the CW network played by Tim Gabriel.

== Creation ==
Thomas spoke on the character's creation, stating "To make up for Nuklon's and Northwind's non-blood-relative status, Dann and I decided that Alan Scott, a.k.a. Green Lantern, would have two kids in the new group—twins, no less... Obsidian became the dark side of the ring's magic, but that concept seems to have taken a bit more time to come together."

== Fictional character biography ==
=== Pre-Crisis ===
Todd Rice is the son of Alan Scott and Rose Canton, respectively the Golden Age superhero Green Lantern and villain Thorn. Todd was raised in an abusive adoptive home in Milwaukee, Wisconsin. As a teenager, he discovers that he has a twin sister, Jennie-Lynn Hayden / Jade. After reuniting, the two follow in their father's footsteps and become superheroes and founding members of Infinity, Inc.

=== Post-Crisis ===
In post-Crisis continuity, Obsidian is a member of the Justice League. After being corrupted by Ian Karkull, Obsidian attempts to cover Earth in darkness. He is defeated in battle by Alan Scott, Obsidian retreats to the Shadowlands, the otherdimensional plane from which he derives his powers. Obsidian later allies with the mystical villains Mordru and Eclipso, but is stopped by the Justice Society and cured of his mental instability.

Afterwards, Obsidan retired, came to terms with being a gay man, and began dating Damon Matthews, an assistant district attorney and ally of Kate Spencer / Manhunter.

Obsidian later degenerates into an egg made of darkness after being attacked by Kid Karnevil. A time-traveling Mister Terrific informs Alan Scott that the egg must be hatched to save Obsidian's life. In the present, Karnevil searches for the egg, but is confronted by a resurrected Obsidian, who takes him out.

==== Brightest Day ====
During the "Brightest Day" storyline, Obsidian and the JSA come into contact with Batman's new Justice League after Alan Scott is possessed by an unknown entity and takes off into the sky. After catching up with Scott and reuniting with Jade, the teams figure out that the being controlling Scott is the Starheart, the cosmic force that granted Scott and his children their abilities. The Starheart then takes over Obsidian's body as well and disappears.

=== Convergence ===
In the 2015 comics event Convergence, a two-part miniseries titled Infinity Inc. featured the return of the pre-Crisis on Infinite Earths version of the Infinity Inc. team, including Todd as Obsidian. Todd and Infinity Inc. were brought to Telos in the series. This Obsidian was based on his pre-Crisis version but had elements of the modern day version of the character as well. His counterparts made veiled references to Todd's sexuality and appeared accepting of him being in a relationship with a man.

=== DC Rebirth ===
In Doomsday Clock, Obsidian is among the Justice Society members who were erased from history when Doctor Manhattan altered history to prevent Alan Scott from becoming a Green Lantern. Obsidian and the Society are later resurrected when Superman convinces Manhattan to return history to normal. Obsidian then reunites with his father, who comes out as gay to him.

== Powers and abilities ==
Obsidian is able to harness the energy of the Shadowlands dimension to manipulate shadows, the result of his father being exposed to shadow energy during a battle with Ian Karkull. Obsidian can merge with his own shadow and possess the shadows of others. In his shadow form, he possesses superhuman strength and can fly and become intangible. After being corrupted by the Shadowlands, Obsidian is able to control his shadow powers to the point that he could grow to enormous size and create objects out of shadow. Obsidian also has limited telepathic abilities and can force a person to see the evil side of their own soul, which has been known to drive people insane.

== Other versions ==
- An alternate universe version of Obsidian appears in Kingdom Come as a member of Batman's Outsiders.
- Two characters based on Obsidian appear in the Tangent Comics universe. The first is Todd Rice, an operative of Nightwing also known as Dark Star, while the second is an unnamed female operative of Nightwing's Russian counterpart Meridian who can transform into stone.
- Two alternate universe versions of Todd Rice appears in The New 52.
- Wraith, a composite character based on Obsidian and Marvel Comics character Gambit, appears in Amalgam Comics.
- An alternate universe version of Todd Rice appears in Absolute Green Lantern. This version is a coffee shop owner from Evergreen, Nevada who was captured, experimented on, and transformed into a monster by Hector Hammond. After obtaining the power of the violet light, Hal Jordan restores Rice to his human form.

== Sexual orientation ==
He has a short-lived, troubled relationship with Marcie Cooper, the third Harlequin, shortly before the disbanding of Infinity, Inc. Later, sexual confusion was shown during his tenure in the Justice League, when he told his friend Nuklon that the only two people he could ever love in the world were his sister and him. When Nuklon asked if he was gay, Obsidian did not fully answer, instead asking "Why must there be labels?" After Obsidian's redemption, JSA penciller Steven Sadowski stated that Todd's sexuality would be dealt with whenever he returned to that title.

Todd shares a kiss with Damon Matthews.

Todd appeared in Manhunter (vol. 3) #18 where he shares a kiss with Damon Matthews, a recurring gay character, and spoke in the fashion of a lover, confirming his sexuality. Marc Andreyko, the writer of Manhunter, goes into detail about selecting Obsidian as Damon's lover:

I didn't want to make a character gay unless it felt organic. So, the list was pretty short. Then I remembered when Obsidian was in the JLA years ago and Gerard Jones, the writer, danced around the issue. I went back and read all my Infinity, Inc.'s and although Todd dated women, it was always a mess.

Andreyko said that DC was supportive, wanting a "visible gay character" and that it was "a general void in the DCU that needed exploration". Geoff Johns, longtime writer of JSA, also stated his support for the idea.

When writer Bill Willingham took over the JSA title, there was a great amount of concern among fans about how this would affect Todd (as Willingham is a Republican). Some fans even feared that Willingham would "cure" Todd's sexuality. In Justice Society of America (vol. 3) #40, Willingham attempted to address this concern in a humorous way by having the newly restored Obsidian announce that his homosexuality has been cured, only for him to quickly renounce this claim, telling the readers, while breaking the fourth wall for a brief moment, that he was only joking and that he was still gay.

As of Justice Society of America (vol. 3) #43 (October 2010), Todd is still dating Damon, confirming this in conversation with his father.

During the crossover Convergence Infinity Inc., Obsidian's sexuality is referenced. His teammates are okay if he is gay, but he denies it even though he brought a close male friend to his sister's theatre performance.

== Rogues gallery ==
The following are enemies of Obsidian:

- Ian Karkull: A former foe of the All-Star Squadron and the Justice Society of America. Having been believed to be dead for decades, Ian manipulated Obsidian to gain access to, and subsequently rule, the Shadowlands. Karkull had apparently been corrupting Obsidian for months in an effort to get revenge on his enemies in the Justice Society.
- Chroma: A cosmic entity that Obsidian faced during his time with Infinity, Inc. Chroma interrupted a televised concert with a song about apocalyptic events. The song, though talking about death, somehow proved so engaging that many people desired to hear it again and again. Todd, having just come off a bad date, found himself uninvolved with the song (thus making him immune to its effects).
- Kid Karnevil: While posing as a new JSA recruit, All-American Kid, Jeremy Karne attacked Obsidian with an illumination device. The attack left Todd in a severely degenerated state. Karne later stole the black egg that Obsidian had degenerated into and handed it over to his allies in the Fourth Reich.
- Harlequin: A former girlfriend of Todd's. She attempted to recruit him to the Manhunters, but he refused. Marcie was later responsible for the murder of Todd's leader and friend, Sylvester Pemberton.

== In other media ==
=== Television ===
- Obsidian makes non-speaking cameo appearances in Justice League Unlimited as a member of the Justice League.
- Obsidian appears in the second season of Legends of Tomorrow, portrayed by Dan Payne as a young man and by Lance Henriksen as an older man. This version is a member of the Justice Society of America, who were primarily active in 1942. As of 1987, he became the last living member of the JSA after most of them were presumed dead while on a mission years prior.
- Todd Rice appears in the third season of Stargirl, portrayed by Tim Gabriel. This version was separated from his sister Jennie-Lynn Hayden and taken in by the Helix Institute for Youth Rehabilitation while looking for her. Additionally, their powers became connected to each other after her ring, which she inherited from their father Alan Scott, is infected by dark matter residue left over from her fight with Eclipso in the second season. Jennie and Todd eventually reunite and she helps him gain control of his powers while Shade agrees to help him further.

=== Film ===
An alternate universe version of Obsidian from Earth-2 makes a non-speaking cameo appearance in Justice League: Crisis on Infinite Earths — Part One. This version is a member of the Justice Society of America.

=== Video games ===
Obsidian appears as a character summon in Scribblenauts Unmasked: A DC Comics Adventure.

=== Merchandise ===
- The Justice League Unlimited incarnation of Obsidian received a Target-exclusive figure in the series' tie-in toyline.
- In 2010, Mattel released a 6" figure of "Todd Rice" -- as the name "Obsidian" was unavailable due to a rights issue -- in the Walmart-exclusive Wave 14 of their DC Universe Classics line.
