= Sandy Hawkins =

Fictional character in DC Comics

- Cover to Justice Society of America, Volume 2 #5 (2007), art by Alex Ross

Publication information
- Publisher: DC Comics
- First appearance: Adventure Comics #69 (December 1941)
- Created by: Mort Weisinger (writer); Paul Norris (artist)

In-story information
- Alter ego: Sanderson "Sandy" Hawkins
- Species: Metahuman
- Team affiliations: Justice Society of America; All-Star Squadron; Young All-Stars; Justice League
- Notable aliases: Sandy the Golden Boy, Sand, Sandman
- Abilities: Prophetic dreams; Armed combat; Silicon-based body

Sanderson "Sandy" Hawkins, formerly known as Sandy the Golden Boy, Sands, Sand and currently known as Sandman, is a character appearing in comics published by DC Comics. He was created by writer Mort Weisinger and artist Paul Norris, he first appeared in Adventure Comics #69. After being unutilized for several years, he was reintroduced by writers David S. Goyer and Geoff Johns in the comic JSA in the late 1990s and with a greatly expanded set of powers and responsibilities. He eventually took on the name of Sandman, succeeding his former mentor.

== Publication history ==
=== Golden Age ===
The character of Sandy the Golden Boy was created as a sidekick to the Sandman. Created by Mort Weisinger and Paul Norris, the nephew of The Sandman's girlfriend Dian Belmont, the character debuted as a tights-wearing youth (in the same vein as Robin the Boy Wonder) in Adventure Comics #69 (Dec 1941). This same issue also showcased a new yellow-and-purple costume for The Sandman.

=== Silver Age ===
The flourish of mystery-men comic books came to an end in the late 1940s. About ten years later, DC Comics reintroduced some of the mystery-men characters in new books, but reimagined them as super-heroes, characters such as Green Lantern and Hawkman. September 1961 saw the publication of "Flash of Two Worlds" in The Flash #123. This was the first new story using an original mystery-man character, namely, the Flash (Jay Garrick). The concept of an Earth-1 and Earth-2 began to be developed and soon other 1940s characters were being used in modern stories. Sandy the Golden Boy was reintroduced to the public by writer Len Wein in Justice League of America #113 in 1974.

Wein wrote of his inspiration in the compilation book Crisis on Multiple Earths Volume 3 (2004): "I had always been a fan of the Golden Age Sandman, and had always wondered why he'd been put back into his double-breasted Man of Mystery Gas-Mask outfit when he was revived, instead of the more traditional purple-and-yellow super-hero costume he'd worn in the latter days of the 1940s. This would make the perfect place to find out. Thus was born The Creature in the Velvet Cage".

In this story, it was revealed that, in the 1940s, Sandy had been transformed into a sand-like creature when an experimental weapon Sandman was testing exploded. Wracked with guilt, Sandman stopped wearing the costume he used as Sandy's partner and went back to his original outfit. The transformed Sandy was later kept in a glass cage for decades. In a later story (DC Comics Presents #47, July 1982), Sandy was finally turned back into his human self and found that he had not aged in all that time; physically, he was still a teenager.

=== The 1980s and 1990s ===
The 1980s saw writer Roy Thomas' World War II era series The All-Star Squadron (pre-Crisis) and the Young All-Stars (post-Crisis). Sandy was brought into the Squadron storyline during the Crisis crossover, beginning with issue #51 (Nov 1985). That book soon ceased printing and was replaced by the Young All-Stars (June 1987) where Sandy played a role in issues 2 through 8. This series states that Sandy is fourteen going on fifteen in the spring of 1942.

Also written by Roy Thomas, the one-issue special Last Days of the JSA published in 1986 depicts the departure of the JSA characters. Although taking place in the modern era (within weeks of the Crisis), Sandy is still depicted as a teenager wearing his World War II uniform of yellow-and-red. The story relates how he and other JSA members are taken into Ragnarok where they must fight forever. Published in 1992, the Armageddon Inferno miniseries written by John Ostrander takes the JSA members out of Ragnarok and brings them back to Earth, allowing writers to use them in future stories. Sandy is one of these characters.

The 1999 series JSA was preceded by a JSA Secret Files special. The special and the series reintroduced Sandy, but now as a young man calling himself Sand. This new and further development of the character was written by James Robinson and David S. Goyer. Issue 18 of the series, written by David Goyer and Geoff Johns, introduced retconned history for the character including his "killing" of Johnny Sorrow in 1944. In reality, Sorrow had been transported to another dimension. The JSA–JSA storyline has Sand time travel to 1951 and interact with Sandman; writer Geoff Johns states the present-day age of the character as being "biologically 25", but his birth year is changed to 1926. The "Velvet Cage" story from the 1970s is also referenced and rewritten to an extent and the year of his transformation into the sand creature was changed from 1947 to 1945. Issue #83 (2006) is part of the One Year Later of the DC comics line; in this issue written by Paul Levitz, Sand is no longer shown as a member of the JSA. Sand makes no more appearances in the series which ended with issue #87 (2006).

This book debuted in February 2007, written by Geoff Johns. The cover of this book shows the round table of the JSA surrounded by 17 heroes including Sandy Hawkins, now wearing a black cape and fedora reminiscent of the original Sandman. According to Geoff Johns' interview in Wizard #180 (October 2006) Sand would become the JSA's "Recon Man" doing more detective work in the process. He was brought in on issue #3, appearing in a cloud of smoke and speaking of nightmares, attributes more recognizable of Wesley Dodds than for Sandy Hawkins. Issue #5 shows this version of Hawkins as more sober and serious than previous incarnations. For about a year the character was not used in the series, nor were his face and name shown in the JSA roll call found framing the main story pages. He was not seen again until issue #14 (2008) where Johns portrayed him as tormented by perverse and horror-filled nightmares. He was briefly freed of these dreams by Gog, but rejects this gift as he felt it made him a less effective investigator, discovering a dead child that he was sure he could have saved if he still had his powers. When the JSA discovers that Gog is forming a parasitic bond to Earth that would make it impossible for him to leave without destroying the planet, Gog takes back his gifts in a fit of anger.

In the "Doomsday Clock" storyline, Hawkins returns alongside many other superheroes to the DC Universe when Doctor Manhattan, inspired by Superman, undoes the changes that he made to the timeline that erased the Justice Society and the Legion of Super-Heroes.

== Powers and abilities ==
Like his mentor, Hawkins developed prophetic dreams. He later gained a silicon-based body that is elastic, highly durable, and able to transform into sand. Additionally he gains control over seismic energy.

=== Equipment ===
Hawkins is proficient with many handgun-based weapons such as gas guns and wirepoon guns.

== In other media ==
- Sandy Hawkins / Sand makes non-speaking appearances in Justice League Unlimited as a member of the Justice League.
- Sandy Hawkins / Sand received an action figure in Mattel's Justice League Unlimited toyline.
