= Slipknot (comics) =

DC Comics character

- Slipknot as depicted in Millennium #4 (January 1988). Art by Joe Staton.

Publication information
- Publisher: DC Comics
- First appearance: The Fury of Firestorm #28 (October 1984)
- Created by: Gerry Conway; Rafael Kayanan

In-story information
- Alter ego: Christopher Weiss
- Species: Human
- Team affiliations: Suicide Squad; Kobra; 2000 Committee; Secret Society of Super Villains
- Abilities: Great physical strength; Speed, agility and reflexes; Ability to climb on every building or harsh object using ropes, grappling pistol or usage of many other advanced rope vessels; High-level fighting skills

Slipknot (Christopher Weiss) is a fictional supervillain appearing in American comic books published by DC Comics. Created by Gerry Conway and Rafael Kayanan, the character made his first appearance in The Fury of Firestorm #28 (October 1984). Initially appearing as an enemy of Firestorm, Slipknot later joined the Suicide Squad.

Adam Beach portrays Slipknot in the DC Extended Universe film Suicide Squad.

== Fictional character biography ==
Christopher Weiss originally worked for a chemical company in the southern United States, where he developed his formula for the durable ropes he would later use as Slipknot.

In Slipknot's first appearance, he is recruited by Multiplex to attack Lorraine Reilly/Firehawk. However, he is defeated and placed in police custody. He makes several subsequent appearances as an antagonist of Firestorm.

Slipknot comes under the attention of the Suicide Squad. They are a varied team, all serving the government for their own reasons. Many members are criminals, who are promised a reduced sentence if they survive their missions. The group's initial mission is to capture Firestorm, who had demanded the U.S. government dispose of their nuclear stockpile on behalf of a terminally ill Martin Stein. Slipknot attempts to kill Suicide Squad leader Rick Flag, but is knocked out by Batman.

During the Millennium storyline, a stronghold of Manhunters is discovered near the Suicide Squad's base at Belle Reve. Slipknot and the Squad are sent to destroy the Manhunters using "Baby Huey", an experimental car bomb. After being overwhelmed by Manhunters, Slipknot attempts to flee. However, his left arm is blown off by an explosive implanted to prevent him from deserting his mission, which he had doubted the existence of. Following the success of the mission, Slipknot is found, weakened and bleeding but still alive, by Duchess.

In Identity Crisis, Slipknot is in prison, having joined the Kobra cult. He is the initial suspect in the murder of Jean Loring, but is later revealed to have no knowledge of the event.

In Final Crisis, Slipknot is revealed to have obtained a prosthetic arm, which is damaged in battle with Tattooed Man. Deathstroke captures Slipknot so that Tattooed Man can kill him and prove his loyalty to Deathstroke's Titans. After a brutal fight, Tattooed Man kills Slipknot by beheading him with a wire.

Slipknot is resurrected following The New 52 continuity reboot, where he is depicted as a member of the Secret Society of Super Villains.

=== Second Slipknot ===
An unidentified, second incarnation of Slipknot appears in Robin (vol. 2) #145.

== Powers and abilities ==
Slipknot is adept at martial arts and hand-to-hand combat. He also wields indestructible ropes.

== Other versions ==
An alternate timeline version of Slipknot makes a minor appearance in Flashpoint: Legion of Doom #2 as a prisoner of Doom prison.

== In other media ==
Slipknot appears in Suicide Squad, portrayed by Adam Beach. This version is a Native American mercenary who is recruited into Amanda Waller's Task Force X program to defeat the Enchantress. However, Captain Boomerang initially believes the nano-bombs implanted into the squad members' necks to dissuade them from abandoning the mission are a ruse and Slipknot is subsequently killed while mounting an escape attempt.
