= Killer Frost =

Fictional character from DC Comics

- Caitlin Snow as Killer Frost in Justice League of America: Killer Frost Rebirth #1 (March 2017). Art by Mirka Andolfo

Publication information
- Publisher: DC Comics
- First appearance: (Frost) Firestorm #3 (June 1978) (Lincoln) Firestorm (vol. 2) #21 (March 1984) (as Louise Lincoln); Firestorm (vol. 2) #34 (April 1985) (as Killer Frost) (Snow) Fury of Firestorm: The Nuclear Man #19 (June 2013) (as Caitlin Snow); Justice League of America (vol. 3) #7.2 (November 2026) (as Killer Frost)
- Created by: (Frost and Lincoln); Gerry Conway; Al Milgrom (Snow); Dan Jurgens

In-story information
- Alter ego: Crystal Frost; Dr. Louise Lincoln; Caitlin Snow
- Species: Metahuman
- Team affiliations: (Frost); Hudson University; Black Lantern Corps (Lincoln); Suicide Squad; Injustice League; Secret Society of Super Villains (Snow); S.T.A.R. Labs; Legion of Doom; Suicide Squad; Justice League
- Notable aliases: (Snow); Frost
- Abilities: (All): Cryokinesis; Thermokinesis; Energy absorption; Heat absorption; Accelerated healing; Superhuman durabilty; Cold immunity; Advanced hand-to-hand combatant

Killer Frost is the name of several characters appearing in American comic books published by DC Comics. All three characters associated with the mantle are metahumans possessing ice powers, and have some connection to the superhero Firestorm.

The first Killer Frost is Crystal Frost, a misandristic scientist who attempts to kill her former professor Martin Stein for rejecting her romantic advances. After Frost's death, her friend Louise Lincoln takes up the mantle of Killer Frost to seek revenge against Firestorm. The New 52 reboot introduced a new Killer Frost named Caitlin Snow, who eventually reforms and joins the Justice League of America as the superhero Frost.

Various iterations of Killer Frost, primarily Crystal Frost and Louise Lincoln, have appeared in various animated projects and video games, primarily voiced by Jennifer Hale. Additionally, Danielle Panabaker portrayed Caitlin Snow, Killer Frost (later renamed Frost), and Khione in The CW's Arrowverse franchise, such as the television series The Flash.

== Fictional character biographies ==
=== Crystal Frost ===
Crystal Frost is the first incarnation of Killer Frost, first appearing in Firestorm #3 (June 1978). While Frost was studying to be a scientist in Hudson University, she fell in love with her teacher Martin Stein. While working on a project in the Arctic, Frost was upset to learn that Stein did not reciprocate her feelings; Stein told a fellow researcher that Frost was a withdrawn student and that Stein had merely tried to draw her out of her shell, which Frost misinterpreted. Frost accidentally locked herself in a thermafrost chamber but survived, gaining the ability to absorb heat and project cold and ice. Calling herself "Killer Frost", she began her murderous crusade against men and battles Firestorm on multiple occasions.

Frost's friend Louise Lincoln later informs her that her body is deteriorating, which will soon kill her. Firestorm is overwhelmed in battle with Killer Frost before Martin Stein convinces him to let Frost absorb his energy, which she believes will sustain her. Frost is unable to handle Firestorm's power, which creates a miniature explosion that kills her.

During the Blackest Night event, Frost is temporarily resurrected as a member of the Black Lantern Corps.

=== Louise Lincoln ===
Dr. Louise Lincoln is the second incarnation; she first appeared in Firestorm (vol. 2) #21 (March 1984) and became Killer Frost in Firestorm (vol. 2) #34 (April 1985). Lincoln was a colleague and friend to Crystal Frost. After her friend's death, Lincoln decided to repeat the experiment as a last respect to her friend, with Lincoln herself as the second Killer Frost. Just as ruthless as her predecessor, she began a vendetta against Firestorm, whom she blamed for her friend's death. She briefly served as a member of the Suicide Squad and sold her soul to Neron for more power.

Lincoln is later diagnosed with cancer and tricks Jason Rusch, the new Firestorm, into curing her. With her health and powers restored, Killer Frost goes on a rampage, only to be defeated when Jason reverses his alterations to her body, returning her cancer.

In DC Universe #0, Killer Frost appears as a member of Libra's Secret Society of Super Villains. She is later seen as one of the villains sent to retrieve the Get Out of Hell Free card from the Secret Six, and ultimately helped deal the killing blow to the crazed supervillain Junior and the troubled vigilante Tarantula.

=== Caitlin Snow ===
In September 2011, The New 52 rebooted DC's continuity; Killer Frost is reintroduced in September 2013, as the "Villains Month" part of the Forever Evil – she was featured in the one-shot Justice League of America (vol. 3) #7.2, also titled Killer Frost #1. She is also seen on the cover of Forever Evil #1, which hints at her involvement in that series. Killer Frost is revealed to be Dr. Caitlin Snow, a scientist who was sent to a S.T.A.R. Labs outpost in the Arctic to work on a thermodynamic engine whose creator had committed suicide. Snow soon discovered the place had been infiltrated by H.I.V.E. agents. When they tried to kill her inside the engine, Snow frantically ripped off the coolant system, merging her body with ice. Transformed into a heat vampire, she killed the H.I.V.E. agents out of revenge. She then wandered out into the cold until she came across a Norwegian camp and took their heat. Hijacking a helicopter, she made it back to her hometown Pittsburgh. She even created a suit that helped her retain heat for longer. She later encountered the superhero Firestorm and discovered that his powers could temporarily heal her mutation. She tried recreating the Firestorm matrix several times, only to fail with each attempt. When Firestorm and the Justice League were declared dead by the Crime Syndicate, she lost hope for a cure to her condition.

In DC Rebirth, Caitlin Snow is taken to Belle Reve Penitentiary, where she is introduced to the Suicide Squad and recruited into the team by Amanda Waller. Snow helps the Suicide Squad in their fight against the Justice League, but subsequently assists them against Maxwell Lord when he is possessed by Eclipso, whose attempt to tap into her "darkest desire" only unlocks her desire to make a difference. She then has to save all the Suicide Squad and the Justice League by absorbing the energy out of Superman and using it against Lord. Afterwards, Waller is forced to release Snow into Batman's custody. Snow goes on to join the new Justice League of America alongside Batman, Atom, Lobo, Black Canary, Vixen, and Ray.

== Powers and abilities ==
All versions have shown the ability to absorb heat from external sources and transmute it into waves of cold. Using these powers, Killer Frost can create an ice-sheen across her entire body that grants her increased durability, cause intense blizzards that can instantly freeze the target and generate objects composed completely of ice, such as projectiles in the form of ice shards and defensive walls or shields. She can also instantly freeze animate matter through physical contact and is unable to touch a normal person without freezing them. If the target negates her cold, Frost can touch them without harming them.

Her weakness is the need to absorb external heat sources to generate ice: although heat-based weapons such as flamethrowers only make her stronger, she can be imprisoned in cold surroundings such as being locked in a refrigeration truck or buried under a mountain of snow. The Caitlin Snow version of Killer Frost is constantly plagued by a hunger for heat, which can only be sated by absorbing the heat from a living being, a process which inevitably kills the victim. However, in recent stories she seems to have finally gotten it under control by only absorbing a tiny amount of heat from every person she touches, sparing them and leaving them otherwise unharmed. Snow and Louise Lincoln have, albeit inconsistently, demonstrated the ability to fly, either by riding Arctic winds or through an unknown manner of self-propulsion.

While the exact limits of her abilities are unspecified, how much power Frost can channel at once seems to depend on how much heat she has absorbed and stored in her body. For example, when she absorbed all the heat from Superman (whose body is supercharged by yellow solar energy) during a stand-off between the Justice League and the Suicide Squad, she was able to flash-freeze the entire League in a single blast. Frost risks dying if she runs out of energy.

The Caitlin Snow version also boasts a genius-level intellect, being S.T.A.R. Labs' youngest and brightest scientist prior to her transformation. She could solve complex equations easily, operate heavy energy generating machinery and appeared particularly skilled in the field of physics and research about energy. She once managed to create an ice prism with her powers that converted Superman's heat vision into a bright burst of sunlight to defeat Eclipso.

Several adaptations of the villain have also depicted the Crystal Frost and Louise Lincoln incarnations as having basic skills in melee combat which they use in conjunction with their powers as well as impressive agility, being able to perform maneuvers such as leaps or cartwheels with ease.

== Other versions ==
An alternate universe version of Killer Frost appears in DC Comics Bombshells. This version is Louise L'inconnue, a servant of Hugo Strange who is of French and German descent and gained her powers after her mother was killed and she was left to die in a well.

== In other media ==
=== Television ===
Crystal Frost / Killer Frost in Young Justice.

- An unidentified incarnation of Killer Frost appears in the DC Animated Universe series Justice League and Justice League Unlimited, voiced by Jennifer Hale. This version is a homicidal member of Gorilla Grodd's Secret Society.
- The Louise Lincoln incarnation of Killer Frost appears in the teaser for the Batman: The Brave and the Bold episode "Darkseid Descending!", voiced again by Jennifer Hale. This version is Ronnie Raymond's vengeful ex-girlfriend and resembles the Crystal Frost incarnation.
- The Crystal Frost incarnation of Killer Frost appears in Young Justice, voiced by Sarah Shahi.
- The Caitlin Snow incarnation of Killer Frost appears in the Justice League Action episode "Freezer Burn", voiced by Mena Suvari. This version gained her powers during a freak accident involving "thermafrost" and is a fan of Mr. Freeze.
- The Louise Lincoln incarnation of Killer Frost makes non-speaking cameo appearances in Harley Quinn. This version's appearance resembles her counterpart from Batman: Assault on Arkham.
- The Caitlin Snow incarnation of Killer Frost appears in Bat-Fam, voiced by Natasha Leggero.

==== Arrowverse ====
Danielle Panabaker as Caitlin Snow / Frost in The Flash.

Danielle Panabaker portrays Caitlin Snow in media set in the Arrowverse. This version is an employee of S.T.A.R. Labs and Ronnie Raymond's fiancée before he is killed stopping a singularity over Central City.

Due to Barry Allen altering the timeline while creating and undoing the "Flashpoint" timeline in the third season, Caitlin develops cryokinetic abilities and an alternate, villainous personality named Frost, both of which she attempts to hide. In the fifth season, Caitlin discovers that her powers originated from her father Thomas' attempts to cure their genetic propensity to ALS.

In the seventh season, Caitlin and Frost are separated by Mirror Monarch's rays and decide to live separate lives as twin sisters. In the eighth season, Frost is killed in battle with Deathstorm. Caitlin tries to resurrect her, but inadvertently creates a new individual named Khione.

Caitlin also appears in the animated series Freedom Fighters: The Ray, with Panabaker reprising the role.

=== Film ===
- The Louise Lincoln incarnation of Killer Frost appears in Superman/Batman: Public Enemies, voiced again by an uncredited Jennifer Hale. This version is a member of the "Cold Warriors".
- The Louise Lincoln incarnation of Killer Frost appears in Batman: Assault on Arkham, voiced again by Jennifer Hale. This version is a member of the Suicide Squad who is later killed by Bane amidst a mass breakout.
- The Crystal Frost incarnation of Killer Frost appears in Suicide Squad: Hell to Pay, voiced by Kristin Bauer van Straten. This version is a "tough girl" who killed her abusive parents after her powers manifested when she was young. Amanda Waller recruits Frost into the Suicide Squad. She defects to siding with Reverse-Flash after he removes her nano-bomb until Waller kills her using Copperhead's.
- The Louise Lincoln incarnation of Killer Frost makes a non-speaking cameo appearance in Injustice.

=== Video games ===
- The Louise Lincoln incarnation of Killer Frost appears as a boss in Justice League Heroes, voiced by Nika Futterman.
- The Louise Lincoln incarnation of Killer Frost appears as a boss in DC Universe Online, voiced by Christina Moore.
- The Louise Lincoln incarnation of Killer Frost appears in Injustice: Gods Among Us, voiced again by Jennifer Hale.
- The Louise Lincoln incarnation of Killer Frost appears as a character summon in Scribblenauts Unmasked: A DC Comics Adventure.
- The Crystal Frost incarnation of Killer Frost appears as a boss in Young Justice: Legacy, voiced by Vanessa Marshall.

==== Lego ====
- The Louise Lincoln incarnation of Killer Frost appears as an unlockable character in the portable version of Lego Batman 2: DC Super Heroes.
- The Caitlin Snow incarnation of Killer Frost appears as a downloadable character in Lego Batman 3: Beyond Gotham.
- The Caitlin Snow incarnation of Killer Frost appears in Lego DC Super-Villains, voiced by Jennifer Hale. This version is a member of the Legion of Doom.

=== Miscellaneous ===
- The Crystal Frost incarnation of Killer Frost appears in Justice League Adventures #12 as a member of the Cold Warriors.
- The DCAU incarnation of Louise Lincoln / Killer Frost appears in issue #21 of the Justice League Unlimited tie-in comic book, in which she enters a relationship with Heat Wave.
- An unidentified incarnation of Killer Frost appears in DC Super Friends #16 as a member of the "Ice Pack".
- The Injustice incarnation of Louise Lincoln / Killer Frost appears in the Injustice: Gods Among Us prequel comic.
- Caitlin Snow / Frost appears in DC Super Hero Girls and its tie-in films, voiced by Danica McKellar. This version is a hero, student at Super Hero High, and roommate of Lady Shiva, Miss Martian, and Star Sapphire.
