= Firestorm (character) =

Superhero published by DC Comics

- The Ronnie Raymond incarnation of Firestorm as depicted in The Fury of Firestorm: The Nuclear Men #0 (November 2012). Art by Yıldıray Çınar.

Publication information
- Publisher: DC Comics
- First appearance: Firestorm the Nuclear Man #1 (March 1978)
- Created by: Gerry Conway; Al Milgrom

In-story information
- Alter ego: Ronnie Raymond; Dr. Martin Stein; Dr. Mikhail Arkadin; Jason Rusch
- Species: Metahuman
- Team affiliations: Justice League
- Abilities: Molecular reconstruction; Fundamental forces control; Atomic manipulation; Energy manipulation; Energy absorption; Energy projection; Radiation generation; Regeneration; Flight; Intangiblity; Interstellar travel; Nuclear pyrokinesis; Superhuman strength; Superhuman durability; Self-sustenance; Teleportation
Firestorm
- Cover of the first issue of Firestorm the Nuclear Man (March 1978). Art by Al Milgrom
Publication information
- Schedule: Monthly
- Format: Ongoing series
- Genre: Superhero
- Publication date: March 1978 – May 2013
- No. of issues: (Firestorm the Nuclear Man) 5; (The Fury of Firestorm) 100; (Firestorm) 35; The Fury of Firestorm the Nuclear Men 21

Firestorm is a superhero appearing in American comic books published by DC Comics. He was created by Gerry Conway and Al Milgrom. Ronnie Raymond and Martin Stein first fused together to become Firestorm in Firestorm, the Nuclear Man #1 (March 1978). Jason Rusch debuted as a modern update of the character in Firestorm (vol. 3) #1 (July 2004), and was created by Dan Jolley and ChrisCross.

Firestorm was featured in The CW's Arrowverse, portrayed by Robbie Amell, Victor Garber, and Franz Drameh (as Jefferson Jackson) mainly in The Flash and Legends of Tomorrow. The character has also appeared in the series Super Friends, Batman: The Brave and the Bold, and Justice League Action.

== Creation ==
In an interview, Conway discussed his reasoning and influences while creating the character: "I always loved the idea of the hair on fire, I think it goes back to Johnny Storm, the Human Torch, an entire flaming character, of course." Conway further elaborated, "I'd been playing around with the idea of a teenage superhero for DC, who could sort of fill the hole that had been left in my heart by leaving Spider-Man behind. I'd been thinking about the tropes — one of which was the meek, mild alter ego, the brainy kid who, in wish fulfillment, gets superpowers, is extremely powerful… able to do things that he hadn't been able to do before. That was, I think, the major motivating force—I wanted to play on that trope. To do that, I wanted to flip it around: create a guy who wasn't the brightest guy in the room, the not-terribly-smart guy who became a superpowered character. The way I'd make that work: I'd bring him into contact with the smarter person, who would also share the powers. This led to… the multiple-people-in-one, Professor Stein/Ronnie Raymond dynamic."

Jack Kirby's design for Lightray's costume influenced the look of artist Al Milgrom's creation of Firestorm. In a 2019 interview, Milgrom admitted: "The facemask on Firestorm, the way it comes around the chin, was probably inspired by Lightray more than anything... I liked the [Lightray] head-covering thing; I said, "I'm stealin' it!".

In a 2016 interview with Comic Book Resources, preceding the release of the comic series Legends of Tomorrow, Conway further discussed the creation of Firestorm. Although Firestorm was created amidst the Cold War and tension over nuclear weapons, Conway stated that nuclear power was not conceived as a core aspect of the character and considered Ronnie Raymond and Martin Stein's dynamic more important.

== Publication history ==
The first Firestorm series was short-lived and canceled after the fifth issue, becoming a victim of the company-wide "DC Implosion". The sixth issue was included in Cancelled Comic Cavalcade.

Writer Gerry Conway added Firestorm to the roster of Justice League of America. This led to a series of eight-page stories in the back of The Flash (issues 289–304; with art by George Pérez, Jim Starlin and others), and a revival of a monthly Firestorm comic written by Gerry Conway in 1982. The Fury of Firestorm (later called Firestorm the Nuclear Man) lasted from 1982 until 1990.

Firestorm (vol. 3) ran from 2004 to 2007, and introduced the second Firestorm, Jason Rusch, following Ronnie Raymond's death in Identity Crisis.

The Fury of Firestorm: The Nuclear Men, a series starring Ronnie Raymond and Jason Rusch, ran from 2012 to 2013 as part of The New 52 continuity reboot. It was initially written by Gail Simone and Ethan Van Sciver and drawn by Yıldıray Çınar. Joe Harris replaced Simone starting in issue #7, while Van Sciver also provided the art for issues #7 and 8 before Çınar returned. Veteran writer/artist Dan Jurgens took over the series with issue #13 in 2012, until the series' end with issue #20 in 2013.

In 2016, Firestorm was one of the features in the Legends of Tomorrow television series, which united Martin Stein and Jefferson Jackson as Firestorm. The unrelated comic series Legends of Tomorrow, published around the same time, was an anthology series with Ronnie Raymond and Jason Rusch as two of the starring characters.

In April 2026, Firestorm received a new ongoing series, The Fury of Firestorm, as part of the "DC Next Level" publishing initiative. The series is written by Jeff Lemire, with art by Rafael De Latorre. Originally a limited series with six issues, The Fury of Firestorm was extended to nine issues, then 15 issues, due to its popularity.

Firestorm has faced off with many enemies in his publication history. Thinker and Danton Black/Multiplex was introduced in issue 1, and Killer Frost was introduced in issue 3. Introduced in Firestorm Volume 2, this included Black Bison, Plastique, the 2000 Committee, Hyena, the Assassination Bureau, Enforcer, Mindboggler, Moonbow, Breathtaker, Pozhar, Sand Demon, Shadowstorm, Shango, Slipknot, Stalnoivolk, Tokamak, Weasel, and Zuggernaut. Other enemies introduced later in publication included Bolt (Blue Devil #6), Brimstone (Legends #1), Naiad (Firestorm, the Nuclear Man #90), and Deathstorm (Brightest Day #10).

== Aliases ==
=== Ronnie Raymond / Martin Stein ===
The original Firestorm was distinguished by his integrated dual identity. High school student Ronnie Raymond and Nobel Prize-winning physicist Martin Stein were caught in an accident that allowed them to fuse into Firestorm. Due to Stein being unconscious during the accident, Raymond was prominently in command of the Firestorm form with Stein a voice of reason inside his mind, able to offer Raymond advice on how to use their powers without having any control. Banter between the two was a hallmark of their adventures. Stein is initially unaware of their dual identity, leaving him concerned about his unusual disappearances and blackouts, but Ronnie eventually convinces him of the truth, allowing them to bond as separate individuals rather than as parts of a whole.

=== Ronnie Raymond / Martin Stein / Mikhail Arkadin ===
When Conway left the series in 1986, John Ostrander (with artist Joe Brozowski) began writing the Firestorm stories. His first major story arc pitted Firestorm against the world as the hero, acting on a suggestion from a terminally ill Martin Stein, demanded that the United States and the Soviet Union destroy all of their nuclear weapons. After confrontations with the Justice League and most of his enemies, Firestorm faced the Russian nuclear superhero Pozhar in the Nevada desert, where an atomic bomb was dropped on them. A new Firestorm resulted, a fusion of the two heroes: this new Firestorm was composed of Ronnie Raymond and the Russian Mikhail Arkadin but controlled by Stein's disembodied amnesiac mind.

=== Fire Elemental ===
The Firestorm with Arkadin proved to be a transitional phase, as in 1989 Ostrander fundamentally changed the character of Firestorm by revealing that Firestorm was a "Fire Elemental". Firestorm now became something of an environmental crusader, formed from Ronnie Raymond, Mikhail Arkadin, and Svarozhich, a Soviet clone of the previous Firestorm, but with a new mind. Martin Stein, no longer part of the composite at all, continued to play a role, but the focus was on this radically different character. New artist Tom Mandrake would create a new look to match. During this time, Firestorm meets Sango and the Orishas, the elemental gods of Nigeria.

By the series' 100th issue, Stein learns that he was intended to be the true Fire Elemental and would have been being it not for Ronnie Raymond also being there by circumstance. Raymond and Arkadin lose their powers and Stein becomes the sole Firestorm. After saving Earth, Stein spends many years traveling through space as a wanderer, rarely returning to Earth.

After the transition to the elemental Firestorm, all of the main characters from the series vanished from the comics for some time after the cancellation of the Firestorm comic in 1990. Ronnie Raymond eventually returns in the pages of Extreme Justice. Raymond, at the time undergoing treatment for leukemia, regains his original powers after a chemotherapy session. Firestorm begins to appear regularly in a number of DC titles, though lacking the guidance and knowledge necessary to use his skills wisely. Firestorm is drafted by Batman into a "replacement" Justice League that was commissioned in case something befell the original team (in this case, being stranded in the distant past in "The Obsidian Age" storyline). After the original team returns, Firestorm remains as a reserve member of the League and participated in events such as a team-up with the Justice Society of America (in JLA/JSA: Virtue and Vice) and the crossover story JLA/Avengers. He was also briefly a member of the Power Company.

=== Jason Rusch ===
Jason Rusch is the second Firestorm, introduced following Ronnie Raymond's death in Identity Crisis. He was created by writer Dan Jolley and artist ChrisCross.

Jason was a 17-year-old living in Detroit who wanted nothing more than to escape his home city. He lived with his father, who had turned abusive after he lost his hand in an industrial accident. His mother left the family sometime after the accident. With the loss of a job he needed for college tuition, Jason turned to a local thug for money, accepting a job as a courier. It was on that job that he encountered the Firestorm matrix, searching for a new host after Ronnie Raymond's death. In the aftermath, Jason struggled to cope with his new identity and powers—a struggle that led to the death of the man who had hired him.

=== Jason Rusch / Martin Stein ===
In the 2006 miniseries Infinite Crisis, it was revealed that Martin Stein, alive in space as the "Elemental Firestorm", had sensed the presence of Jason Rusch within the Firestorm matrix, but was unaware of Ronnie Raymond's death. When Jason, as Firestorm, was gravely wounded in the line of duty, Stein linked with him in a variation of the merge, promising Jason a new Firestorm body to let him return into battle (although Stein had been unable to save his friend Mick Wong) and asking him about Ronnie's fate.

Accepting Stein's proposal, Jason asked him to become the permanent second member of the Firestorm matrix. Sensing his "errors" (including Mick's death) were the result of his youth and lack of experience, he sought the experience and maturity of Stein. Stein refused at first, but later accepted Jason's request, thus ensuring both a new Firestorm body and the reconstruction of human bodies for both Rusch and Stein.

It was revealed in Infinite Crisis that Jason would have been a native of Earth-Eight in the old multiverse.

=== Jason Rusch / Firehawk ===
As the storyline jumped ahead one year (and the series was re-titled as Firestorm the Nuclear Man from issue #23 on), Martin Stein has mysteriously vanished, and Jason Rusch has been merging with Firehawk to become Firestorm, allowing him to use her powers as well. The two decided to look for Stein together. Stein had been kidnapped and tortured by the Pupil (Adrian Burroughs), his former teaching assistant. Flanked by the D.O.L.L.I.s, a group of cyborg soldiers of limited cognitive ability, the Pupil questioned Stein about the secrets of the universe. Jason and Firehawk, along with the mysterious teleporter Gehenna, freed the captured Stein and restored him to full health. Jason is a college freshman at New York City's Columbus University and seems to have ties with Dani Sharpe, a member of the senior staff at LexCorp.

The Firestorm team of Jason and Firehawk made several appearances across the DC universe before the search for Martin Stein ended. This included dealing with the latest OMAC and teaming up with Superman in the "Back in Action" story arc in Action Comics. Firehawk later introduced Jason to Pozhar, a Russian superhero who was once a part of the Firestorm matrix; together, the trio takes on a newly reborn Tokamak. This series ended with Firestorm the Nuclear Man #35 (April 2007).

=== Jason Rusch / Ronnie Raymond ===
In Blackest Night, Ronnie Raymond is resurrected as a Black Lantern dubbed Deathstorm. In Brightest Day, Deathstorm becomes a separate entity. Ronnie is fully resurrected by the Life Entity and works with Jason to stop him from destroying the universe.

In The New 52 continuity reboot, Ronnie and Jason are classmates who gain powers after obtaining Martin Stein's "God Particle". They are able to operate as separate Firestorms or merge into a creature dubbed Fury.

=== Doomsday Clock ===
The DC Rebirth relaunch restores a version of Firestorm's initial origin to continuity. In Doomsday Clock, Doctor Manhattan informs Ronnie Raymond that Martin Stein deliberately transformed the two into Firestorm to study metahumans. Ronnie, furious at Stein, begins operating as Firestorm on his own. However, he is taken over by the Firestorm matrix, which is revealed to be sentient.

== Powers and abilities ==
Firestorm has the ability to rearrange molecular or particle structures of any substance into almost anything else, creating different atomic structures of equal mass. He can transmute the basic composition of an object (e.g., transmuting lead into gold) and can also change its shape or form at will. Much like Green Lantern's limitations, Firestorm can only create items whose workings are understood by the "driver" of the Firestorm matrix, though he can make more complex sentient constructs out of the matrix's energies. Unlike Green Lantern's creations, Firestorm's alterations are permanent unless he reverses them.

Initially, he could not affect organic matter without painful, even lethal, feedback (i.e., fatal biophysical disruption or even localized particle motion phenomena like extreme changes in the weather). It was later revealed that Firestorm could always change organic matter, but opted not to. After Jason Rusch became Firestorm, however, this weakness appeared to have dissipated. With old and new variations, the organic limitation does not extend to his own person, as its users can molecularly change their driver self at will, allowing them to regenerate lost or damaged bodily tissue, boost immune systems, shape-shift, increase physical capabilities and survive indefinitely without food, sleep, water or air. Capacities as such produce superhuman levels of strength, durability, stamina and resistance to injury great enough to challenge the New Gods or surviving the rigors of outer space and sitting near the inner corona above the Sun's photosphere without discomfort. Stein has stated Firestorm's power to be theoretically infinite, harnessing the spark of creation, the Big Bang itself. However, infinite power runs the risk of burning out its host.

While the Firestorm matrix can be utilized by a single host, it is not recommended. The matrix functions best with two people, a primary and secondary pilot to comprehend and master it. Martin Stein instructed Jason Rusch on how to study current and potential powers available to them within the matrix and to manually adjust them on the fly at a later date. Its main source of energy stemmed from the ambient stellar energies of native stars and suns, but it could also use its co-pilot as a power source, though they will burn out over time and genetically disintegrate if not properly adjusted to its power.

The merging aspect of the matrix can enable outside fusions that assimilate any inherent abilities these others might possess. However, this can diminish its effectiveness and stability. Rusch has shown he can spontaneously warp himself and others he had previously merged with to his specific location, triggering the neural pathway connection and allowing the gestalt to access each other's knowledge and memories to better utilize Firestorm's capabilities. Users of the Firestorm matrix can access a type of ancestral memory from the continuum of past matrix users, allowing them to access the latest knowledge of the atoms comprising it. This also translates into a form of time-space sight in which the matrix user can glimpse the past, present, future, and alternate lives of every other Firestorm throughout reality using a collective of subatomic wormholes that exist as a part of the matrix. This power is too complex to properly control; thus, it has been highly unreliable as an ability.

The driver can fly at supersonic speeds in an atmosphere and reach escape velocities. The driver can also adjust the driver's body's size or pull and enlarge others from the subatomic universe at will, Jason Rusch having once dragged Ray Palmer from his microscopic size to the natural world while on Apokolips. Manipulation of the self at the subatomic level allows the driver to become intangible and pass through solid objects. This allowed Rusch to communicate with John Stewart and sift through his mind telepathically after he had been taken over by the void beast. Firestorm is also adept at absorbing and redistributing radiation or energy both harmlessly and productively. He can generate destructive or concussive blasts of nuclear energy through which he can also channel his transmutation.

While the matrix grants the fusers unique powers, it can also accidentally bestow them on individuals caught in the matrix by mistake. One example is Nanette Phaedon, who gained the ability to change her quantum state for size-shifting and flight by her own will. Following Ronnie Raymond's resurrection during Brightest Day, Firestorm gained the ability to switch "drivers" between Ronnie and Jason at will; before that, only the active driver was in control, with the dormant consciousness only able to advise the other. One of the faults of a Firestorm fusion is that the stronger psyche will have dominance of the matrix's power, such as when Jason fused with Luis Salvador who overpowered him from the passenger seat of the matrix.

During The New 52, the Firestorm matrix could be shared through multiple users at a time. Users could fuse and become stronger, but more unstable. The entity formed between Ronnie and Jason when using the matrix in tandem created a nuclear being called Fury. It is also shown that the matrix shares a kinship to the Quantum Field in some way, enabling Firestorm users to derive its power for subatomic transmutation and manipulation. The matrix may be related to the God particle theory. Its merging properties can place a large burden on the user; Firestorm runs the risk of reaching critical mass and detonating. At worst, the fusion of too many users in the matrix could trigger a second Big Bang.

== Enemies ==
In alphabetical order (with issue and date of debut appearance).

Villain	First appearance	Description
2000 Committee	Firestorm (vol. 2) #17 (October 1983)	A clandestine organization that sought control of the United States government by the year 2000. Some of their former operatives included Multiplex, Tokamak, and Slipknot and hired Breathtaker's Assassination Bureau to capture Firestorm. One of their higher-ranking members was Martin Stein's ex-wife Clarissa Clemens.
Assassination Bureau	Firestorm (vol. 2) #29 (November 1984)	An organization that uses metahuman assassins to kill people at a high price.
Bazooka Joan	Firestorm (vol. 2) #29 (November 1984)	An operative of the Assassination Bureau. She rides a hover cycle featuring a large back-mounted cannon.
Black Bison	Firestorm (vol. 2) #1 (June 1982)	When Bison-Black-as-Midnight-Sky is killed by muggers, his soul takes over his great-grandson's body John Ravenhair via an amulet to avenge wrongs done against the Native American people.
Bolt	Blue Devil #6 (November 1984)	Primarily a foe of Blue Devil, Bolt is an assassin and a member of Multiplex's group of criminals that targeted Firestorm.
Breathtaker	Firestorm (vol. 2) #29 (November 1984)	Head of the Assassination Bureau, a band of killers-for-hire.
Brimstone	Legends #1 (November 1986)	Sent by Darkseid to assist Glorious Godfrey in turning citizens against Earth's heroes. It would go on to threaten Earth's sun.
Bug and Byte	Firestorm (vol. 2) #23 (May 1984)	Siblings Bernard and Blythe Bonner became a criminal duo where Bug used a power suit and Byte could turn into energy.
Casey Krinsky	Firestorm (vol. 2) #4 (October 2004)	Obsessed with Firestorm (Jason Rusch), Casey can steal the power and matter of whatever she touches.
Deathstorm	Brightest Day #10 (September 2010)	During Blackest Night, Ronnie Raymond was resurrected as a Black Lantern. After Nekron's defeat, the corpse managed to remain inside the Firestorm matrix. Separating from the matrix, he seeks to torture the Firestorm hosts in order to create another Big Bang and destroy all life.
Enforcer	Firestorm (vol. 2) #14 (July 1983)	Leroy Merkyn was hired by Multiplex under orders of Tokamak's civilian identity to capture Firestorm with a cybernetic suit of armor. Upon failure, Tokamak killed him.
Enforcer	Firestorm (vol. 2) #14 (July 1983) (as Mica); Fury of Firestorm #18 (November 1983) (as Enforcer)	An employee for Tokamak, Mica used the Enforcer armor to try and capture Firestorm, but failed. She would later join the Suicide Squad and die in combat.
Flying Dutchman	Firestorm (vol. 2) #70 (April 1988)	Rikkard Rynders was obsessed with time travel and used drugs to practice astral projection. Leaving his body and entering the timestream, he permanently disembodied himself. Inevitably, he was able to enter the Firestorm matrix, subjugate it, and use it to go back in time. Eventually, Ronnie and Martin were able to regain control, expel Rynders, and return to the present.
Goldenrod	Firestorm (vol. 2) #19 (January 1984)	Fred Delmar dies after taking the drug Nuvafed and his body is dumped in the forest. The drug reacts with the plants therein and reanimates Delmar as the plant-man Goldenrod, who seeks revenge against the drug makers.
Hyena	Firestorm #4 (September 1978)	Summer Day was cursed as a werehyena and her psychological issues with her policeman father and failure to become a cop compels her to attack criminals and police officers when she turns into her monstrous form.
Hyena	Firestorm (vol. 2) #10 (March 1983)	Psychiatrist Jivan Shi manipulated Summer into cursing him as a werehyena so he could revenge himself against doctors.
Incognito	Firestorm (vol. 2) #29 (November 1984)	A shapeshifter in the Assassination Bureau.
Killer Frost	Firestorm #3 (June 1978)	Scientist Crystal Frost was spurned by Martin Stein and developed the power to absorb heat and create cold after being locked in a thermafrost chamber. With these abilities, she initiated a deadly rampage against men. She died absorbing too much power from Firestorm in one of their battles.
Killer Frost	Firestorm (vol. 2) #21 (March 1984)	Following Crystal Frost's death, her friend Louise Lincoln repeated the former's accident and became the new Killer Frost seeking revenge against Firestorm.
King Crusher	Firestorm (vol. 2) #51 (September 1986)	Taking steroids to become a stronger wrestler, Crusher turned into a green, muscular behemoth similar to Killer Croc.
Mindboggler	Firestorm (vol. 2) #29 (November 1984)	Leah Wasserman is a mercenary for the Assassination Bureau with the ability to confuse the senses of others and subvert their will. She was killed while serving in the Suicide Squad.
Danton Black / Multiplex	Firestorm #1 (March 1978) (as Danton Black); Firestorm #2 (April 1978) (as Multiplex)	Formerly an assistant to Martin Stein, Danton Black was fired and sought to steal blueprints from his former employ. The explosion that created Firestorm provided Black the power to split into multiple versions of himself.
Naiad	Firestorm, the Nuclear Man #90 (October 1989)	Mai Miyazaki was murdered by an employee of the Shogun Oil Company for protesting. She was reborn as Earth's water elemental and initiated the "Elemental War" with Firestorm (fire elemental), Swamp Thing (earth elemental), and Red Tornado (wind elemental).
Parasite	Firestorm (vol. 2) #58 (April 1987)	Rudy Jones was a S.T.A.R. Labs janitor whom Darkseid manipulated into being exposed to radiation in a waste container, gaining the ability to absorb the life force and abilities of others. Drafted into the Suicide Squad to subdue Firestorm, Parasite went berserk and attacked his teammates, Firestorm, and the Justice League (the latter also came to capture Martin Stein).
Plastique	Firestorm (vol. 2) #7 (December 1982)	A Canadian terrorist, Bette Sans Souci was foiled in her attempt to be a suicide bomber when Firestorm dissolved her outerwear, leaving her nude. Embarrassed, she underwent genetic testing to be able to unleash explosive blasts of force.
Pozhar	Firestorm (vol. 2) #62 (August 1987)	After an accident in a nuclear reactor, Mikhail Arkadin was granted nuclear powers and became the Russian hero Pozhar. Ordered to battle Firestorm when Stein sought to eliminate the world's nuclear weaponry, a nuclear bomb was dropped on the pair during combat and they were fused into a new Firestorm. He would later be removed from the matrix and returned to Russia.
Sand Demon	Firestorm (vol. 2) #51 (September 1986)	The manager to King Crusher who provided him with mutative steroids. Eddie Slick was exposed to the same drugs as his wrestler and buried in the desert for exposing the drug ring behind the steroids. Developing the power to control sand, he sought revenge and crossed paths with Firestorm.
Satin Satan	Justice League of America #179 (June 1980)	Operating out of the Studio, a local disco, Satin Satan is possessed by the demon Sataroth, who has been kidnapping young people including Firestorm.
Shadowstorm	Firestorm (vol. 2) #96 (April 1990)	When the shadows of the Orisha-Nla spread across the Earth, Firestorm was exposed to them, creating a copy of him fueled by darkness and anger that sought to destroy the original.
Shango	Firestorm (vol. 2) #95 (March 1990)	African god of storms, Shango sought his brother Obatala on Earth and was interrupted by Firestorm in his search. He strikes the hero with his ax, sending him to Ifé.
Silver Deer	Firestorm (vol. 2) #25 (July 1984)	When her brother and father were murdered by a bigot, Silver Deer studied Cherokee mystics arts and sought revenge against white people. To this end, she sought aid from Black Bison.
Silver Shade	Firestorm (vol. 2) #53 (November 1986)	Xavier Purvis is a metahuman with the power to absorb energy and use it to shape metal who built a suit to amplify his powers and sought Firestorm to fuel his abilities.
Slipknot	Firestorm (vol. 2) #28 (October 1984)	Christopher Weiss uses his talent for rope use as a mercenary for the 2000 Committee under the direction of Tokamak.
Sparx	Firestorm Annual Vol. 2 #3 (1985)	Substance abuser Frido Kelp develops the ability to manipulate electricity and comes into conflict with Firestorm.
Stalnoivolk	Firestorm (vol. 2) #67 (January 1988)	The Steel Wolf, Ivan Illyich Gort was the Russian Superman who slaughtered under orders of Joseph Stalin during and after World War II. After Stalin's death, Gort was exiled due to his cruelty. He was later sought by the Red Shadows to battle Firestorm. Stalnoivolk would kill Ronnie's grandfather Richard Dare (Captain X during WWII) before being defeated. Bears some similarities to Captain Nazi and Iron Munro.
Stratos	Firestorm (vol. 2) #29 (November 1984)	Member of the Assassination Bureau able to control wind.
Thinker	Firestorm #1 (March 1978) (as Cliff Carmichael); Firestorm (vol. 2) #99 (July 1990) (as the Thinker)	A frequent sparring partner of Ronnie Raymond at Vandemeer University, Cliff Carmichael had a psychological break after paralyzing his cousin and was institutionalized. There, the Thinking Cap of the original Thinker was used on him and Cliff used it to improve upon its design, placing microchips in his brain and developing the power of telepathy. He was drafted into the Suicide Squad, but later betrayed them. When Jason Rusch took up the Firestorm mantle, Cliff combated him with Multiplex and Typhoon in his thrall.
Tokamak	Firestorm (vol. 2) #15 (August 1983)	Henry Hewitt, head of the Hewitt Corporation, was a high-level member of the 2000 Committee that used Multiplex to turn Lorraine Reilly into Firehawk. Data gathered from the event was used to turn Hewitt into Tokamak, the Living Reactor. In this capacity, he faced Firestorm on behalf of the 2000 Committee.
Tokamak	Firestorm (vol. 2) #28 (October 2006)	Hewitt cloned himself to survive a terminal illness and assumes the name Victor Hewitt, claiming to be Henry Hewitt's son. He sought to create meltdowns worldwide to empower himself, but was defeated by Firestorm, Firehawk, and Pozhar.
Trash	Firestorm (vol. 2) #54 (December 1986)	Steve Brockman just wanted to be a rock star, but had no talent. So he designed a guitar that created sonic blasts, force fields, and enabled flight.
Typhoon	Flash #294 (February 1981)	Exposed to radiation and ocean water, Martin Stein's colleague David Drake developed the ability to control weather. Initially going berserk whenever he entered the Typhoon identity, Drake later learned to control his powers and developed a hatred for Firestorm due to his numerous defeats at his hands.
Venom	Firestorm Annual #4 (1986)	Todd Walton sought to develop a non-addictive painkiller but instead created Venom-X, an addictive hallucinate that gives abusers snake-like qualities. Walton went on a killing spree, equipped with a wrist-mounted blaster that fired his drug.
Weasel	Firestorm (vol. 2) #35 (May 1985)	John Monroe became the costumed serial killer Weasel to get revenge on those that mocked him as a youth. Monroe later joins the Suicide Squad, only to be killed by Rick Flag Jr. under the control of the original Thinker. In The New 52 reboot, Monroe is resurrected and depicted as a humanoid weasel.
Zuggernaut	Firestorm (vol. 2) #69 (March 1988)	Matvei Rodor merged with an alien symbiote to become the Zuggernaut and sought revenge against corrupt prosecutor Soliony and came into conflict with Firestorm. The hero reflected one of the alien hybrid's energy blasts, mortally wounding Rodor who was abandoned by the extraterrestrial.

== Other versions ==
Firestorm has appeared in various alternate realities within the DC Multiverse: a gender-reversed version appears in Countdown: The Search for Ray Palmer as an inhabitant of Earth-11; a version of Ronnie Raymond appeared in JLA: The Nail, as a captive of Cadmus Labs; a Firestork of the Just'a Lotta Animals; and a fusion of Ronnie Raymond and Nathaniel Adam of Earth-37 called Quantum-Storm who was summoned by Monarch in the miniseries Countdown: Arena. A 31st-century clone of Firestorm appeared as part of the eponymous team in the series Justice League 3000.

== In other media ==
=== Television ===
- The Ronnie Raymond / Martin Stein incarnation of Firestorm appears in Super Friends: The Legendary Super Powers Show, voiced by Mark L. Taylor and Olan Soule respectively.
- The Ronnie Raymond / Martin Stein incarnation of Firestorm appears in The Super Powers Team: Galactic Guardians, voiced by Mark L. Taylor and Ken Sansom respectively.
- The Ronnie Raymond / Martin Stein incarnation of Firestorm was planned to appear in Justice League Unlimited, with writer/producer Dwayne McDuffie stating that the series' producers had permission from DC Comics to use them. However, the series' creators could not come up with a story that they liked. Later on, it was stated that the character was intended to be the focus of "The Greatest Story Never Told", but was ultimately replaced with Booster Gold.
- The Ronnie Raymond / Jason Rusch incarnation of Firestorm appears in Batman: The Brave and the Bold, voiced by Bill Fagerbakke and Tyler James Williams respectively. Producer James Tucker said, "...the smart kid has the body and he's got this dumb guy in his head telling him stuff...it's kind of a total flip of the original Firestorm".
- The Ronnie Raymond incarnation of Firestorm appears in the Robot Chicken DC Comics Special segment "Real Characters From the DC Universe", voiced by Alfred Molina.
- The Ronnie Raymond / Martin Stein incarnation of Firestorm appears in Justice League Action, voiced by P. J. Byrne and Stephen Tobolowsky respectively.

=== Arrowverse ===
Franz Drameh as Jefferson "Jax" Jackson—the second Firestorm–in the Arrowverse as depicted in Legends of Tomorrow

Firestorm appears in media set in The CW's Arrowverse, with Martin Stein portrayed by Victor Garber, Ronnie Raymond portrayed by Robbie Amell, and Jefferson "Jax" Jackson portrayed by Franz Drameh.

- Stein, Raymond, and Jackson first appear in the live-action TV series The Flash, with Stein and Raymond as the first incarnation of Firestorm after they were fused with the former's F.I.R.E.S.T.O.R.M. matrix during the explosion of Harrison Wells' particle accelerator. They initially lack control over their powers until Wells safely separates them, allowing the pair to master their powers and join the Flash in fighting crime until Raymond sacrifices himself to save Central City. After the F.I.R.E.S.T.O.R.M. matrix begins to destabilize and threaten Stein's life, Team Flash eventually find Jackson, who joins forces with Stein to become the new Firestorm despite initial hesitancy and leaves Central City with him to hone their powers.
  - Additionally, Jason Rusch appears in the episode "Revenge of the Rogues", portrayed by Luc Roderique.
  - An Earth-2 incarnation of Ronnie called Deathstorm appears in the episode "Welcome to Earth-2" as Killer Frost's significant other, and an enforcer for Zoom before being killed by the latter.
  - Deathstorm from Earth-Prime appears in the eighth season, additionally portrayed by Milton Barnes, Alexa Barajas, Rick Cosnett, and Michelle Harrison. This version is a cold fusion entity who obtained sentience following Earth-1 Raymond's sacrifice. Deathstorm attacks and kills indiscriminately throughout Central City to feed on grief until it is defeated by Hell Frost.
- Jackson and Stein appear in the animated web series Vixen, with Drameh and Garber reprising their respective roles.
- Jackson and Stein appear in the live-action TV series Legends of Tomorrow, with Drameh and Garber reprising their respective roles and Graeme McComb portraying a younger version of Stein. Stein and Jackson join the Legends in traveling through and stopping evildoers across time until the "Crisis on Earth-X" crossover, during which Stein is killed by Nazis from Earth-X and takes a formula developed by Ray Palmer to prevent Jackson from dying with him.

=== Film ===
- The Jason Rusch incarnation of Firestorm appears in Justice League: Crisis on Two Earths, voiced by Cedric Yarbrough. Additionally, an unnamed, alternate universe version appears as a member of the Crime Syndicate.
- The Jason Rusch incarnation of Firestorm appears in Lego DC Comics Super Heroes: The Flash, voiced by Phil LaMarr.
- The Ronnie Raymond incarnation of Firestorm appears in Justice League: Crisis on Infinite Earths.

=== Video games ===
- The Ronnie Raymond / Martin Stein incarnation of Firestorm appears as a playable character in Lego Batman 3: Beyond Gotham, voiced by Nolan North.
- The Jason Rusch / Martin Stein incarnation of Firestorm appears as a playable character in Injustice 2, voiced by Ogie Banks and Fred Tatasciore respectively.
- The Jason Rusch / Martin Stein incarnation of Firestorm appears as a playable character in Lego DC Super-Villains.

=== Miscellaneous ===
- The Ronnie Raymond incarnation of Firestorm appears in the Justice League Unlimited tie-in comic.
- An unidentified Firestorm makes a cameo appearance in The Order of the Stick #359.

== Collected editions ==
- Firestorm the Nuclear Man - collects Firestorm the Nuclear Man #1–5, the unpublished #6 and backup stories from The Flash Vol.1 #289-293
- Firestorm the Nuclear Man: Reborn - collects vol. 3 #23–27
- The Fury of Firestorm the Nuclear Men Vol. 1: God Particle - collects vol. 4 #1–6; 144 pages, September 2012, 978-1401237004
- The Fury of Firestorm the Nuclear Men Vol. 2: The Firestorm Protocols - collects vol. 4 #7–12 and #0; 160 pages, June 2013, 978-1401240325
- The Fury of Firestorm the Nuclear Men Vol. 3: Takeover - collects vol. 4 #13–20; 176 pages, December 2013, 978-1401242923
- The DC Universe by Dwayne McDuffie - collects Action Comics #847, The Demon #26-29, Impulse #60, JLA Showcase 80 Page Giant #1, Batman: Gotham Knights #27, Sins of Youth: Kid Flash/Impulse #1, Firestorm: The Nuclear Man vol. 3 #33-35; 280 pages, February 2023, 978-1779521637
