= Naiad (character) =

Publication information
- Publisher: DC Comics
- First appearance: Firestorm (vol. 2) #90 (October 1989)
- Created by: John Ostrander (writer); Tom Mandrake (artist)

In-story information
- Alter ego: Mai Miyazaki
- Species: Metahuman
- Supporting character of: Firestorm
- Abilities: Hydrokinesis; Hydrokinetic form

Naiad (Mai Miyazaki) is a character appearing in comics published by DC Comics. She first appeared in Firestorm (vol. 2) #90 (October 1989), during the four-issue Elemental War storyline, and was created by John Ostrander and Tom Mandrake.

== Fictional character biography ==
Mai Miyazaki is a Japanese environmentalist who is murdered by operatives of the Shogun Oil Company while protesting a drilling rig in the sea off the coast of Alaska. Miyazaki is reborn as the water elemental Naiad and destroys the drilling rig. Enraged and out of control, Naiad attacks Firestorm, the fire elemental.

Swamp Thing begins looking for Firestorm because his attempts to terraform an African desert valley have affected the Green, a force connecting plant life. Firestorm is able to temporarily calm Naiad and Red Tornado, both of whom have been driven mad by pollution. However, the two quickly return to normal, bury Firestorm underwater, and head for Japan, intending to kill its entire population. A drowning Firestorm is contacted by Maya the "Earth Mother", who tells him that she created him and the three other elementals to guard nature and force humanity to evolve. Swamp Thing saves Firestorm from drowning; the two head to Tokyo, intent on stopping Naiad and Red Tornado. Firestorm recounts his meeting with Maya to the other elementals, who are convinced to stand down.

== Powers and abilities ==
Naiad is Earth's current Water Elemental. She possesses the ability to control all water in her immediate vicinity, as well as teleport by manifesting in small or large bodies of water anywhere on Earth.

== In other media ==
Naiad appears as a character summon in Scribblenauts Unmasked: A DC Comics Adventure.
