= Doomsday Clock (comics) =

Superhero comic book published by DC Comics

- Variant cover for Doomsday Clock #1 (November 2017) featuring Superman and Doctor Manhattan by Gary Frank.

Publication information
- Publisher: DC Comics
- Format: Limited series
- Genre: Superhero
- Publication date: November 2017 – December 2019
- No. of issues: 12
- Main characters: Watchmen; DC Universe

Creative team
- Written by: Geoff Johns
- Penciller: Gary Frank
- Letterer: Rob Leigh
- Colorist: Brad Anderson
- Editors: Brian Cunningham; Amedeo Turturro; Bobbie Chase (executive editor)

Doomsday Clock is a 2017–2019 superhero comic book limited series published by DC Comics, written by Geoff Johns with art by penciller Gary Frank and colorist Brad Anderson. The series concludes a tangential story established in the New 52 and DC Rebirth, and it is a sequel to the 1986–1987 graphic novel Watchmen by Alan Moore, Dave Gibbons and John Higgins, making it the first official crossover between Watchmen and the mainstream DC Universe.

At the time, DC co-publisher Dan DiDio promoted Doomsday Clock as an official "sequel" to Watchmen. However, series writer and DC Chief Creative Officer Geoff Johns declined to characterize it as such, viewing it as a "standalone" story.

The series's debut issue was published on November 22, 2017, and the final issue was published on December 18, 2019.

== Publication history ==
Doomsday Clock is part of the DC Rebirth initiative, and it continues the narrative that was established with the 2016 one-shot DC Universe: Rebirth #1, the 2017 crossover event "The Button" and other related stories. It is a follow-up to the 1986–1987 miniseries Watchmen by Alan Moore, Dave Gibbons and John Higgins, and it introduces that story's characters into the DC Universe, alongside a few original characters created for the book. Although Dan DiDio (then DC's co-publisher) confirmed that it is a sequel to that miniseries, Johns originally declined to characterize it as such, viewing it as a standalone story, saying, "It is something else. It is Watchmen colliding with the DC Universe."

Doomsday Clock was revealed on May 14, 2017, with a teaser image displaying the Superman logo in the 12 o'clock slot of the clock depicted in Watchmen and the series title in the bold typeface used for Watchmen.

The story includes many characters, but it has a particular focus on Superman and Doctor Manhattan. Johns felt like there was an interesting story to be told in DC Rebirth with Doctor Manhattan; he thought there was an interesting dichotomy between Superman—an alien who embodies and is compassionate for humanity—and Doctor Manhattan—a human who has detached himself from humanity. This idea led to over six months of debates amongst the creative team about whether or not to intersect the Watchmen universe with the DC Universe. He explained that Doomsday Clock was the "most personal and most epic, utterly mind-bending project" that he had worked on in his career.

Johns also explained that Doomsday Clock is a stand-alone story with no tie-in material. However, it "will have an impact on the entire DC Universe. It will affect everything moving forward and everything that has come before. It will touch the thematic and literal essence of DC." So by the time the final issue is released, "the rest of the universe will have caught up to it—and the repercussionsof the event will become known."

=== Release schedules ===
The first issue of Doomsday Clock was released on November 22, 2017, with a planned run of 12 issues. The series was scheduled to release monthly and end in December 2018, with planned breaks in March and August 2018. However, in January 2018, it was announced that the series would take a break in March and April 2018, before releasing again in May 2018 and switching to a bi-monthly schedule, with the series ending in July 2019. Issue #8 was pushed back from November 28 to December 5, 2018. Issue #9 was pushed back from January 23 to March 6, 2019. Issue #10 was pushed back from March 27 to May 29, 2019. Issue #11 was pushed back from May 22 to September 4, 2019. The twelfth and final issue was published on December 18, 2019.

Two collected editions of six issues each were released in October 2019 and June 2020. A single-volume edition of all 12 issues followed in October 2020. An Absolute Edition collecting the full series and extra bonus material was released in October, 2022.

== Setting ==
=== Plot ===
Doomsday Clock is the finale of the story that was established in DC Rebirth, officially concluding the storylines that began in the New 52 continuity. The comic features the concept of the Multiverse, where the Watchmen universe exists separately from the DC Universe and each universe's characters treat the other universe's characters as fictional.

In the Watchmen universe, seven years after the massacre in New York City, the details inside Rorschach's journal have been published, exposing Ozymandias's role in the event. Now a fugitive, Ozymandias gathers several others to find Doctor Manhattan and bring him back to save the world. Reggie Long, the new Rorschach, attempts to enlist the help of Batman, while Ozymandias consults Lex Luthor.

Meanwhile, in the DC Universe, during the present day, the Supermen Theory, a conspiracy theory that accuses the federal government of the United States of creating its own metahumans, has created international conflict and led to an arms race, with various governments around the world recruiting metahumans and creating sanctioned superteams.

Dr. Manhattan, who is thought to have deliberately manipulated the post-Flashpoint universe, has a vision of the future in which he believes he and Superman will try to kill each other.

=== Characters ===
Doomsday Clock features characters from Watchmen and the DC Universe, and it also introduces some new characters, such as Reggie Long, the son of Malcolm Long, who becomes the new Rorschach; Mime and Marionette, a married couple of criminals searching for their missing son; and Bubastis II, a clone of the original Bubastis.

Other returning characters include the Comedian, Doctor Manhattan, Mothman, and Ozymandias, alongside Alfred Pennyworth, Batman, Black Adam, Firestorm, Johnny Thunder, Joker, Lex Luthor, Lois Lane, Pozhar, Saturn Girl, Superman and Wonder Woman.

== Issues ==
Issue	Title	Written by	Drawn by	Coloured by	Publication date	Critic rating	Critic reviews	Ref.
#1	"That Annihilated Place"	Geoff Johns	Gary Frank	Brad Anderson	November 22, 2017	8.6/10	56	
On November 22, 1992, seven years after the massacre in New York City, Adrian Veidt's plan for world peace has failed after the details of Walter Kovacs' journal were published. Consequently, Veidt becomes a fugitive as the U.S. stands on the brink of war with Russia. As preparations for nuclear war begin, a new Rorschach breaks into prison to retrieve Marcos Maez and Erika Manson. Rorschach takes them to his partner Veidt, who is dying of a terminal disease. Veidt offers the couple the location of their son and $200 million if they help him locate his former colleague Doctor Manhattan. Meanwhile, in another universe, Clark Kent has a nightmare about the night Jonathan and Martha Kent were killed in a car crash. Clark's wife Lois wakes him, as she cannot remember the last time Clark had a nightmare. Clark then tells Lois that he does not think he has ever had one before. Seven years ago, the New Frontiersman revealed details about Veidt's main role in the New York massacre, but it was ignored. Over time, Robert Redford ordered reopening the case after he became President of the United States. He meets some fragment huge, and stops to guess What powerful but unrecorded race Once dwelt in that annihilated place. — "Ozymandias" (Horace Smith)
#2	"Places We Have Never Known"	Geoff Johns	Gary Frank	Brad Anderson	December 27, 2017	8.6/10	40	
Marionette joins Mime, Rorschach and Veidt aboard the Owlship. Just as nuclear war between countries commences, Veidt activates a machine that transports the Owlship to the most recent location of Manhattan's electron particles. After crashing into an abandoned fairground and cuffing Marionette and Mime, Veidt and Rorschach explore Gotham City, noting the differences between the universes. After conducting research at a local library, Veidt discovers that this Earth is going through its own political crisis due to the Supermen Theory, which has put the United States at odds with Russia and Markovia. This has been brought up by Helga Jace, Lady Clayface, Man-Bat, and Metamorpho. Additionally, public opinion has turned against Batman while Wayne Enterprises is under threat of a takeover from LexCorp. Looking for allies in their search for Manhattan, Rorschach confronts Batman in the Batcave while Veidt confronts Lex Luthor. Veidt and Luthor are then attacked by a seemingly-resurrected Edward Blake, while Mime and Marionette escape in the Owlship. Various media mention the Supermen Theory and how it accuses the U. S. government of creating its own metahumans in order to expand its dominion around the world. We are torn between nostalgia for the familiar and an urge for the foreign and strange. As often as not, we are homesick most for the places we have never known. — Carson McCullers
#3	"Not Victory nor Defeat"	Geoff Johns	Gary Frank	Brad Anderson	January 24, 2018	8.5/10	35	
In a flashback, it is revealed that Manhattan intervened in Veidt's murder of the Comedian by saving him from the fall and transported the latter to Metropolis. In the present, Veidt has a brief fight with the Comedian and is badly injured while escaping. Meanwhile, Rorschach tries to convince Batman to help locate Manhattan by presenting him with Kovacs' journal. Batman tells Rorschach to make himself at home while he reads. In a retirement home, the elderly Johnny Thunder stares out the window during a thunderstorm while waiting for his family to take him out to dinner, but they never arrive. Elsewhere, Marionette and Mime explore Gotham City and stumble into a bar in the Joker's territory, killing several of his men. After drinking a toast to finding their son, they decide to go in search of Joker. Rorschach has a nightmare of Veidt's monster attacking New York. When he awakens, Batman tells him that he has tracked a temporal anomaly to Arkham Asylum. However, Rorschach discovers that Batman has tricked him when he is locked up in Arkham, being told by Batman that he belongs there. Old newspapers report the murder of Carver Colman, a noir film actor who played the character "Nathaniel Dusk". For better it is to dare mighty things, to win glorious triumphs, even though checkered by failure...than to rank with those poor spirits who neither enjoy nor suffer much because they live in a gray twilight that knows not victory nor defeat. — Theodore Roosevelt
#4	"Walk on Water"	Geoff Johns	Gary Frank	Brad Anderson	March 28, 2018	8.5/10	38	
While incarcerated at Arkham and after being protected from inmates by Vortex, Rorschach recalls his past as Reggie Long, the son of Malcolm Long. Shortly after the New York massacre, he met Byron Lewis in an asylum, who taught Reggie some fighting moves. Shortly after Veidt's crimes were exposed, Reggie escaped the asylum which Byron set on fire and traveled to Veidt's retreat in Antarctica to exact revenge. However, Reggie decided to spare Veidt when he showed remorse. In the present, Reggie is evaluated by Batman under the disguise of a therapist which he discusses with Alfred Pennyworth. Imra Ardeen frees Reggie and they escape Arkham. Prior to committing suicide, Byron wrote letters to his sister who died in the New York massacre caused by Ozymandias. The miracle is not to walk on water. The miracle is to walk on earth. — Linji Yixuan
#5	"There Is No God"	Geoff Johns	Gary Frank	Brad Anderson	May 30, 2018	8.5/10	40	
Lois and Clark agree that someone is behind the Supermen Theory, which has triggered an international metahuman arms race leading the United Kingdom, France, Markovia, Russia, Israel, India, and China to establish their own superhero teams. Killer Frost claims that Firestorm, Captain Atom, Firehawk, Moonbow, and Typhoon were products of the government as Firestorm claims that the Supermen Theory is a hoax. Hawk and Dove are arrested in Russia by the Rocket Red Brigade while Sam Lane pulls his troops out of Qurac. Veidt escapes from the hospital and returns to the Owlship where he is confronted by Batman. As they flee the Gotham police, the two argue over how their respective heroes treated their worlds, with Veidt believing Manhattan came to the DC Universe because of its heroes' simplistic "pulp hero" morality. Batman falls out of the Owlship and into a rioting mob. Lois confronts Lex who denies being behind the Supermen Theory. He claims that a metahuman and former member of the Justice League created metahumans for the government. With the Comedian hot on their trail, Mime and Marionette locate Joker who has a beaten Batman delivered to him. After escaping from his retirement home, Johnny Thunder travels to Pittsburgh to locate Alan Scott's Green Lantern at a ruined steel factory. He is saved from thugs by Saturn Girl and Rorschach, who are searching for Manhattan. Meanwhile, Black Adam offers asylum to every metahuman who was rejected by their respective governments after saving Creeper from being sacrificed by the Kobra organization. When men make Gods, there is no God! — Eugene O'Neill
#6	"Truly Laugh"	Geoff Johns	Gary Frank	Brad Anderson	July 25, 2018	8.1/10	36	
Joker leads Marionette and Mime to a secret meeting of the supervillain community headed by the Riddler. The villains discuss the ongoing Supermen Theory as well as the tensions rising over Black Adam's invitation to Kahndaq. Sonar claims that Green Lantern's alien enemies are not on Earth, Doctor Poison mentions rumors about the Amazons forcefully dragging Wonder Woman back to Themyscira, and Tattooed Man states that Sanctuary "screwed up" his successor. Typhoon and Moonbow are accused of being government stooges. Suddenly, the Comedian appears and attacks the villains, shooting Typhoon. Mime and Marionette leave with Joker as Mirror Master evacuates the Rogues. The next morning, Comedian confronts them before he is joy-buzzed by the Joker. The metahuman arms race continues with Iran, Japan, and Australia creating their own superteams. At the Department of Metahuman Affairs, the rumors surrounding Typhoon and Moonbow are revealed to be true and the director orders Typhoon's body to be retrieved for study. To truly laugh, you must be able to take your pain, and play with it. — Charlie Chaplin
#7	"Blind Spot"	Geoff Johns	Gary Frank	Brad Anderson	September 29, 2018	8.6/10	37	
Veidt uses his pet lynx Bubastis II (a clone of the original Bubastis who contains a sliver of Manhattan's power) and the Lantern battery to teleport himself, Rorschach, Saturn Girl and Johnny Thunder to the Joker's funhouse and summon Doctor Manhattan. Manhattan reveals that Marionette is again pregnant and that Veidt faked his remorse and cancer in order to gain Reggie's help. Veidt then reveals that Walter Kovacs changed Malcolm Long's world view, leading to his separation from his wife; a secret Byron Lewis tried to hide to protect Reggie. Manhattan reveals that he came to the DC Universe to look for a place in the world, but saw nothing as he peered into the future. Reggie attacks Veidt and takes off his Rorschach mask. Veidt returns to the Owlship, saying that he has a plan to save the world. Mime and Marionette leave with Comedian and the Lantern battery. Around the world, teams of metahumans carry out missions on behalf of their governments. Superman is the only hero allowed to travel internationally as his heroics speak for themselves. Black Adam attacks Israel, escalating global tensions. Manhattan returns to Mars and reflects on a vision he had of Superman attacking him one month in the future that results in the end of everything. Veidt's files show how Bubastis II was created. Seeing-is-believing is a blind spot in man's vision. — R. Buckminster Fuller
#8	"Save Humanity"	Geoff Johns	Gary Frank	Brad Anderson	December 5, 2018	8.7/10	34	
After breaking into the Oval Office at the White House, Ozymandias leaves with some files. A confrontation between Firestorm and Pozhar in Russia becomes an international incident when Firestorm accidentally turns a crowd of civilians into glass. At the Daily Planet, Lois finds a flash drive which shows footage of the Justice Society of America, a team that she has never heard of. After finding Firestorm at the Chernobyl Nuclear Power Plant in Chernobyl, Ukraine, Superman helps him restore a young boy to normal and heads to Moscow, where Vladimir Putin is declaring war on the United States. When Russian soldiers open fire on Firestorm, many of the glass victims are shattered. The People's Heroes proceed to fight Superman and Firestorm when an energy spike is detected. Batman detects that the energies are similar to Manhattan's and realizes that he is the real culprit behind the people turning to glass. A massive explosion consumes Superman and Firestorm, downs the Batwing, and knocks out the world's technologies. Veidt is shown watching the events in Moscow from an undisclosed location with a Russian military uniform and an AK-74 rifle lying behind him. Afterward, several newspapers show distrust in Superman because of the incident. The urge to save humanity is almost always a false front for the urge to rule. — H. L. Mencken
#9	"Crisis"	Geoff Johns	Gary Frank	Brad Anderson	March 6, 2019	8.6/10	31	
Examining a Legion ring that once belonged to Ferro Lad, Doctor Manhattan is confronted by most of Earth's superheroes, who have tracked the energy spike from the Moscow explosion to Mars. Guy Gardner leads everyone in attacking Manhattan after Martian Manhunter broadcasts Manhattan's vision of his future encounter with Superman. Manhattan transports Firestorm seven years into the past, where Firestorm learns that Martin Stein deliberately caused the accident that created Firestorm to learn more about metahumans. During the fight, Manhattan dissects Gardner's power ring and analyzes the magic attacks used by the Justice League Dark. Despite Captain Atom disintegrating Manhattan, he reforms his body and takes out all the heroes in an instant. At the Hall of Justice, Lois watches over a recovering Superman while protesters have gathered outside the Hall of Justice following the events in Moscow. Lex Luthor confronts Lois and reveals he sent her the flash drive as proof that someone is undermining all of creation, mentioning Wally West's history as an example. Wonder Woman comes out of hiding to address the United Nations, hoping to defuse the metahuman arms race. However, the summit is interrupted by Black Adam, Creeper, and Giganta, who take advantage of the absence of the other superheroes to attack the UN. Stein has written a file about Firestorm, mentioning that he founded the Department of Metahuman Affairs to help other metahumans like his son, who died because he could not control his powers. Wherever there is a human being, there is an opportunity for crisis. — Seneca
#10	"Action"	Geoff Johns	Gary Frank	Brad Anderson	May 29, 2019	9.1/10	29	
Doctor Manhattan remembers arriving in the DC Universe to start over and meeting aspiring actor Carver Colman, who would later be murdered by his mother Charlotte after a blackmail attempt over his homosexuality. He learns that the DC Universe is actually a "Metaverse" that is in constant change, and in turn, the Multiverse reacts to changes in the DC Universe. Outside forces have been causing Superman's arrival on Earth to constantly shift forward in time, which makes Manhattan realize that Superman is the center of the Metaverse. When Manhattan intervened during the Flashpoint event creating The New 52 era, he was warned by Wally West about the incoming consequences. Back in the present, Manhattan spares the defeated heroes, but makes sure they will not interfere with what is next. He then transports himself from Mars to Earth causing Superman to awake from his coma. Among the evidence of Colman's death, there was a letter from his mother which was later burnt by his maid to protect his secrets and save his acting career. There was also a script describing the final scenes of Colman's last film, titled The Adjournment which a younger Johnny Thunder worked on the set of. Every action has its pleasures and its price. — Socrates
#11	"A Lifelong Mistake"	Geoff Johns	Gary Frank	Brad Anderson	September 4, 2019	7.7/10	32	
Lex Luthor tells Lois that he was tracking several anomalies related to the current timeline. After reading Kovacs' journal, Alfred tries to convince Reggie to help him, but the latter refuses and leaves. Mime and Marionette still hold Comedian hostage. Black Adam moves on to the White House after the Amazons take Wonder Woman back to Themyscira. Sam Lane admits his involvement in the Supermen Theory. Ozymandias reveals to Saturn Girl and Johnny that Mime and Marionette's child will be adopted by Laurie Juspeczyk and Daniel Dreiberg. He also reveals he leaked the details of Stein's involvement with the Supermen Theory to the Russians, and that Bubastis II caused the explosion around Firestorm and Superman to frame Doctor Manhattan and make him confront the other heroes on Mars. Saturn Girl is erased from the timeline. At the White House, Superman confronts Adam, Creeper, Giganta, Doc Dread, Killer Frost, Lady Clayface, Man-Bat, Manhunter, Sandstorm, and Stingaree. In the middle of these events, Superman finally meets Manhattan in person. Among the LexCorp files, there are "copies" of Manhattan's photo with his ex-girlfriend Janey Slater, alongside a picture of the first meeting between Barry Allen and Jay Garrick. Luthor tells Lois that he wants to find Manhattan, believing he has information about the universe evolving; therefore Luthor wants to break his endless feud with Superman. I am not afraid to make a mistake, even a great mistake, a lifelong mistake and perhaps as long as eternity too. — "A Portrait of the Artist as a Young Man" (James Joyce)
#12	"Discouraged of Man"	Geoff Johns	Gary Frank	Brad Anderson	December 18, 2019	7.9/10	28	
As several factions are fighting around Washington, D.C., Batman and Alfred convince Reggie to become Rorschach once more. After a talk with Superman, Manhattan regains his sense of hope and reverses his previous actions by destroying and recreating the DC Universe—restoring the previous timeline (including the Justice Society of America, Jonathan and Martha Kent, and the Legion of Super-Heroes with subtle differences) and the Multiverse in the process—and changing Carver Colman's fate. Peace is restored when the restored superhero groups help Superman defeat Black Adam's group. Superman's name is cleared, Stein is arrested for his actions related to the Supermen Theory as the Justice Society is currently investigating the Department of Metahuman Affairs, and Firestorm is undergoing treatment. Luthor uses a device to return the Comedian to the moment of his death. Manhattan returns to the Watchmen universe with Rorschach and Ozymandias. Mime and Marionette stay with their unborn daughter, hoping to reunite with their son in the future. Back in the Watchmen universe, Doctor Manhattan saves the Earth by making all nuclear weapons disappear. Ozymandias is imprisoned for his crimes while people around the world protest the further buildup of nuclear weapons. Reggie makes his peace with Lewis and Kovacs while operating as Rorschach. Manhattan raises Mime and Marionette's son as his own, naming him Clark. Manhattan eventually disappears, transferring his life force to the planet and his powers to Clark. Clark is sent to Laurie and Daniel's home to be adopted by them. Following his peaceful death, Carver Colman is honored on the Hollywood Walk of Fame. Every child comes with the message that God is not yet discouraged of man. — Rabindranath Tagore

== Reception ==
Doomsday Clock received acclaim from critics. On the review aggregator Comic Book Roundup, it holds an average rating of 8.5 out of 10 from professional critics, based on 438 reviews.

== Aftermath and sequel ==
Following the release of the final issue, Geoff Johns stated that he and Gary Frank were considering the possibility of a sequel for Doomsday Clock.

The events of Doomsday Clock have been referenced in later works of the DC Universe:

- Dark Nights: Death Metal (2020)
- Generations (2020)
- Infinite Frontier relaunch (2021)
- Flashpoint Beyond (2022)
- The New Golden Age (2022)
- DC All In relaunch (2024)

== Collected editions ==
Title	Material collected	Published date	ISBN
Doomsday Clock: Part 1	Doomsday Clock #1–6	October 2019	978-1779501202
Doomsday Clock: Part 2	Doomsday Clock #7–12	June 2020	978-1779501189
Doomsday Clock: The Complete Collection	Doomsday Clock #1–12	October 2020	978-1779506054
Absolute Doomsday Clock	Doomsday Clock #1–12	October 2022	978-1779515605
