= Brightest Day =

2010–11 crossover storyline published by DC Comics

- Variant cover of Brightest Day 0 (June 2010 DC Comics), art by Ivan Reis
- Publisher: DC Comics
- Publication date: June 2010 – June 2011
- Genre: Superhero
Title(s)
Brightest Day #0–24
- Main character(s): Green Lantern; Reverse-Flash; Jade; Osiris; Maxwell Lord; Hawkman; Hawkgirl; Aquaman; Martian Manhunter; Firestorm; Captain Boomerang; Deadman; Hank Hall; Anti-Monitor; Black Manta; Siren

Creative team
- Writer(s): Geoff Johns; Peter Tomasi
- Penciller(s): Scott Clark; Patrick Gleason; Joe Prado; Ivan Reis; Ardian Syaf
- Inker(s): Oclair Albert; Dave Beaty; Vicente Cifuentes; Mark Irwin
- Letterer: Rob Clark
- Colorist: Peter Steigerwald
- Editor(s): Eddie Berganza; Rex Ogle; Adam Schlagman
- Volume 1 (hardcover): ISBN 1-4012-2966-2
- Volume 2 (hardcover): ISBN 1401230830
- Volume 3 (hardcover): ISBN 1401232167
- Volume 1 (paperback): ISBN 1401232760

"Brightest Day" is a 2010–2011 crossover storyline published by DC Comics, consisting of a year-long comic book maxiseries that began in April 2010, and a number of tie-in books. The story is a direct follow-up to the "Blackest Night" storyline that depicts the aftermath of the events of that storyline on the DC Universe.

== Plot ==
At the end of the 2009–2010 Blackest Night storyline, 12 deceased heroes and villains are resurrected for an unknown purpose. The events of Brightest Day follow their exploits as they seek to learn the secret behind their resurrection.

The story begins the day after Blackest Night showing Boston Brand smashing his tombstone. Nearby, a baby bird falls out of its nest and dies, but Boston resurrects it. The ring then takes him to everyone that was resurrected and he (while being invisible) sees how they are celebrating their new leases on life. Boston then asks the ring why it is showing him this; its answer was - it needs help. It then takes him to the destroyed Star City and creates a forest.

== Characters ==
=== Main characters ===
- Green Lantern
- Aquaman
- Boston Brand
- Captain Boomerang ("Digger" Harkness)
- Firestorm (Ronnie Raymond)
- Hawk (Hank Hall)
- Hawkgirl (Shiera Hall)
- Hawkman (Carter Hall)
- Jade
- Martian Manhunter
- Maxwell Lord
- Osiris
- Reverse-Flash (Eobard Thawne)

=== Supporting characters ===
- Black Manta
- Dove (Dawn Granger)
- D'Kay D'Razz
- Hath-Set
- Jason Rusch and Martin Stein
- Mera
- Siren

== Assignments ==
Brightest Day #7 reveals that the twelve resurrected must complete an individual assignment given to them by the Life Entity to be fully resurrected.

- Reverse Flash frees Barry Allen from the Speed Force.
- Jade balances the darkness.
- Osiris frees the nature goddess Isis.
- Maxwell Lord stops Magog from causing the future events of Kingdom Come.
- Hawkgirl prevents Hath-Set from killing Hawkman.
- Hawkman closes the dimensional gateway between Hawkworld and Earth.
- Aquaman enlists the new Aqualad.
- Martian Manhunter kills D'Kay D'Razz, a Green Martian criminal, and devotes himself to protecting Earth.
- Jason Rusch and Ronnie Raymond stop Deathstorm from destroying the universe.
- Captain Boomerang throws a boomerang at Dove.
- Hawk is assigned to catch the boomerang, but fails to do so.
- Boston Brand finds a new champion to bear the white light.

== Publication history ==
The series, written by Geoff Johns and Peter Tomasi, was published twice a month for 24 issues (25 if including issue #0) alternating with Justice League: Generation Lost written by Keith Giffen and Judd Winick. Johns has discussed the general theme:

Brightest Day is about second chances. I think it's been obvious from day one that there are major plans for the heroes and villains from Aquaman to take center stage in the DC Universe, among many others, post-Blackest Night. Brightest Day is not a banner or a vague catch-all direction for the DC Universe, it is a story. Nor is Brightest Day a sign that the DC Universe is going to be all about 'light and brighty' superheroes. Some second chances work out...some don't.

Brightest Day also crossed over into the Green Lantern series, the Green Lantern Corps, Justice League of America, The Titans and The Flash. Gail Simone returned to a new volume of the Birds of Prey comic book, which also went under the same banner. Other tie-ins included the first issues of a relaunched Green Arrow and the Justice Society of America. Jeff Lemire wrote the one-shot Brightest Day: The Atom Special with artist Mahmud Asrar, which acted as a springboard for an Atom story to co-feature in Adventure Comics with the same creative team.

The Green Lantern series featured more of the characters Atrocitus, Larfleeze, Saint Walker, and Indigo-1 in a story arc titled "New Guardians". Johns said that Firestorm is a "main character" in Brightest Day.

The first issue, issue #0, was penciled by Fernando Pasarin. David Finch, a newly DC exclusive artist, illustrated the covers for the entire series.

Brightest Day event was also used to introduce Jackson Hyde, the new Aqualad created for the Young Justice animated series, into the DC Universe. Similarly, the final issue reintroduces Swamp Thing and John Constantine into the mainstream DC Universe after their extended time in DC's Vertigo Comics imprint.

== Titles ==
- Brightest Day #0-24 (twice monthly, 25 issues including issue #0) focuses on the resurrected Deadman, Hawkman, Hawkgirl, Martian Manhunter, Aquaman, and Firestorm.
- Green Lantern (vol. 4) #53-62 focuses on Hal Jordan, as well as the other representatives of the other Lantern Corps, as they attempt to prevent the capture of all the emotional entities which eventually leads to the Green Lantern Corps War.
- Green Lantern Corps (vol. 2) #47-57 focuses on Kyle Rayner, John Stewart, and Ganthet as they face the revolt of the Alpha Lanterns and the return of the Weaponers of Qward until the War of the Green Lantern Corps erupts.
- Green Lantern: Emerald Warriors (issues #1-6) focuses on Guy Gardner, Kilowog, Arisia Rrab, Sodam Yat, and Bleez as they battle Krona to prevent the War of the Green Lantern Corps.
- Brightest Day: The Atom Special is a one-shot that was bannered as a Brightest Day tie-in, but is in actuality an introduction to the Atom miniseries contained within Adventure Comics #516-521 and Giant-Size Atom #1.
- Birds of Prey (vol. 2) #1-6 focuses on the resurrected Hawk as well as the Dove's connection to the White Light.
- The Flash (vol. 3) #1-7 features the resurrected Captain Boomerang.
- Green Arrow (vol. 4) #1-12 focuses on the Star City forest that sprouted from the White Lantern ring.
- Justice League of America (vol. 3) #44-48 focuses on the resurrected Jade as she tries to save her brother Obsidian and father Alan Scott from the control of the Starheart.
- Justice League: Generation Lost #1-24 (twice monthly, 24 issues) focuses on Booster Gold, Captain Atom, Fire, and Ice as they attempt to find the resurrected Maxwell Lord.
- Justice Society of America (vol. 3) #40-43, which is part of the storyline shared with Justice League of America #44-48.
- Titans (vol. 2) #24-30 focuses on the resurrected Osiris as he joins a team of villains led by Deathstroke, and composed of the Tattooed Man, Cheshire, and a new character named Cinder. An additional special called Titans: Villains For Hire Special #1 precedes number #24 and deals with the death of Ryan Choi, the fourth Atom, at the hands of the villains. For unknown reasons, issue #28 was the last issue to be labeled as a Brightest Day tie-in.

=== Involved, but not listed, under the Brightest Day banner ===
- Action Comics (beginning with issue #890–900) focuses on Lex Luthor and his universal quest to locate the energy of the Black Lantern Corps. Incidentally, issue #890 was labeled as Blackest Night Aftermath.
- Booster Gold (vol. 2) #33–43 picks up on elements of the search for Maxwell Lord in Justice League: Generation Lost.
- Power Girl #13–23 is loosely connected with Justice League: Generation Lost.
- Untold Tales from Blackest Night #1 (October 2010)
- Green Lantern: Larfleeze Christmas Special: while not bannered as a "Brightest Day" tie-in, this issue is a tongue-in-cheek one-shot issue focusing on Larfleeze's misunderstanding of the meaning of Christmas.
- Shazam! #1: this one-shot is loosely connected with Osiris' mission to rescue his sister Isis.
- Teen Titans (vol. 3) #83 explains why Blue Beetle would be taking a leave of absence from the Titans, and the events of Generation Lost #2 are indirectly mentioned there as well.
- War of the Green Lanterns is a storyline that crosses over all three Green Lantern titles, and is a direct continuation of the "Brightest Day" story arcs (Green Lantern #63-67, Green Lantern Corps #58-60, Green Lantern: Emerald Warriors #7-10 and War of the Green Lanterns: Aftermath #1-2).

== Brightest Day Aftermath: The Search for Swamp Thing ==
In June, a three-issue miniseries involved the return of John Constantine to the DC Universe and his attempt to convince Superman and Batman that the choosing of Alec Holland (the new Swamp Thing) as the Earth's new protector is inevitable and the resurrected Alec Holland will have to die, so that his soul can merge again with the Green.

- Brightest Day Aftermath: The Search for Swamp Thing #1, 32 pages, June 22, 2011
- Brightest Day Aftermath: The Search for Swamp Thing #2, 32 pages, July 27, 2011
- Brightest Day Aftermath: The Search for Swamp Thing #3, 32 pages, August 24, 2011

== Collected editions ==
The series is collected into a number of volumes:

- Brightest Day Volume One (collects Brightest Day #0–7, 256 pages, hardcover, December 2010, ISBN 1-4012-2966-2; softcover, December 2011, ISBN 1-4012-3276-0)
- Brightest Day Volume Two (collects Brightest Day #8–16, 240 pages, hardcover, May 2011, ISBN 1-4012-3083-0; softcover, May 2012, ISBN)
- Brightest Day Volume Three (collects Brightest Day #17–24, 280 pages, hardcover, September 2011, ISBN 1-4012-3216-7)

Other titles are also being collected:

- Birds of Prey Volume One: Endrun (collects Birds of Prey (vol. 2) #1–6, 160 pages, hardcover, May 2011, ISBN 1-4012-3131-4)
- The Flash Volume One: The Dastardly Death of the Rogues (collects The Flash (vol. 3) #1–6 and The Flash Secret Files and Origins 2010 #1, 208 pages, hardcover, February 2011, ISBN 1-4012-2970-0; paperback, January 2012, ISBN 1-4012-3195-0)
- Green Arrow Volume One: Into the Woods (collects Green Arrow (vol. 4) #1–7, 192 pages, hardcover, July 2011, ISBN 1-4012-3073-3)
- Green Arrow Volume Two: Salvation (collects Green Arrow (vol. 4) #8–14, 192 pages, paperback, February 2013, ISBN 978-1-4012-3528-4)
- Green Lantern: Brightest Day (collects Green Lantern (vol. 4) #53–62, 256 pages, hardcover, June 2011, ISBN 1-4012-3181-0, paperback, May 2012, ISBN 978-1-4012-3141-5)
- Green Lantern Corps: Revolt of the Alpha Lanterns (collects Green Lantern Corps (vol. 2) #21–22 and 48–52, 176 pages, hardcover, May 2011, ISBN 1-4012-3139-X)
- Green Lantern Corps: The Weaponer (collects Green Lantern Corps (vol. 2) #53-57, 128 pages, hardcover, October 2011, ISBN 1-4012-3281-7, paperback, October 2012, ISBN 1-4012-3441-0)
- Green Lantern: Emerald Warriors Volume One (collects Green Lantern: Emerald Warriors #1–7, 176 pages, hardcover, August 2011, ISBN 1-4012-3079-2)
- Justice League: Generation Lost Volume One (collects Justice League: Generation Lost #1–12, 320 pages, hardcover, April 2011, ISBN 1-4012-3020-2; paperback, February 2012, ISBN 1-4012-3225-6)
- Justice League: Generation Lost Volume Two (collects Justice League: Generation Lost #13–24, 320 pages, hardcover, October 2011 ISBN 1-4012-3283-3)
- Justice League of America: the Dark Things (collects Justice League of America #44-48, Justice Society of America #41-42).

== In other media ==
A Brightest Day skin attributed to Batman is one of the special skins in Batman: Arkham Origins.
