= Doctor Manhattan =

Watchmen character

- Art by Dave Gibbons

Publication information
- Publisher: DC Comics
- First appearance: Watchmen #1 (September 1986)
- Created by: Alan Moore; Dave Gibbons

In-story information
- Alter ego: Dr. Jonathan "Jon" Osterman; Calvin "Cal" Abar (né Jelani)
- Species: Metahuman
- Team affiliations: United States Department of Defense
- Partnerships: Romantic partners: Janey Slater; Laurie Juspeczyk; Angela Abar Children: Christopher "Topher" Abar; Rosie Abar; Emma Abar; Clark Osterman
- Abilities: See list: Omnipotence *; Omniscience *; Omnipresence *; Reality warping*; Disintegration; Time manipulation; Time travel; Cosmic awareness; Science manipulation; Telepathy; Telekinesis; Energy manipulation; Atomic manipulation; Density manipulation; Retrocognition; Precognition; Clairvoyance*; Subatomic perception and control; Size manipulation; Intangibility; Immortality *; Reconstruction; Superstrength; Flight; Levitation; Phasing; Extrasensory perception; Elemental transmutation; Elemental manipulation; Energy construct creation; Energy projection; Photokinesis; Power distribution; Teleportation; Superhuman intelligence; Invulnerability *; Perfect memory; Dimensional travel; Electricity manipulation; Self-duplication; Self-sustenance; History manipulation*

Doctor Manhattan (Dr. Jonathan "Jon" Osterman) is a fictional DC Comics character created by writer Alan Moore and artist Dave Gibbons. He debuted in the limited series graphic novel, Watchmen.

After a laboratory accident, atomic physicist Jon Osterman gains the ability to observe and manipulate matter at the subatomic level. The U.S. government dubs him Doctor Manhattan due to his immense destructive potential. As he explores the extent of his powers, Jon becomes increasingly detached from his personal life and his understanding of the human experience, which dehumanizes him. Media analysts view his portrayal in the novel as a significant exploration of the tension between absolute power and its moral use, as well as a commentary on American exceptionalism in the late 20th century.

Manhattan later appeared in the Before Watchmen comic book prequel. In 2016, as part of DC Comics' Rebirth relaunch, Manhattan became a major character in the DC Universe. He was one of the main characters in the Doomsday Clock miniseries, published from 2017 to 2019.

Manhattan made his first live-action debut in the 2009 film Watchmen, played by Billy Crudup. He also appeared in the 2019 limited television series Watchmen, played by Yahya Abdul-Mateen II, with his original form played by Darrell Snedeger.

== Publication history ==
Dr. Manhattan's chosen symbol

Doctor Manhattan is partially based on Charlton Comics' Captain Atom, although he has more in common with Gold Key Comics' Solar. In Moore's original proposal, Captain Atom was surrounded by the shadow of a nuclear threat. However, Moore found he could do more with Manhattan as "a supreme super-hero" than he ever could have done with Captain Atom. Moore sought to delve into nuclear physics and quantum mechanics in constructing the character of Manhattan. He believed a character living in a quantum universe would not perceive time from a linear perspective, which would influence the character's perception of human affairs. Moore also wanted to avoid creating an emotionless character like Spock from Star Trek, so he allowed Manhattan to retain "human habits", but eventually grow away from them and humanity in general.

Gibbons had created the blue character Rogue Trooper, and reused the blue skin motif for Manhattan as it visualised electrical or atomic energy while still resembling human skin tonally and "reading as Jon Osterman's skin would've read, but in a different hue". Moore incorporated color into the story, and Gibbons noted the rest of the comic's color scheme made Manhattan unique.

Moore recalled that he was unsure if DC would allow the creators to depict the character as fully nude, which partially influenced how they portrayed the character. Gibbons wanted to tastefully depict Manhattan's nudity, selecting carefully when full frontal shots would occur and giving him "understated" genitals—like a classical sculpture—so the reader would not initially notice it. Manhattan's forehead is marked with the atomic structure (specifically the Bohr model) of hydrogen, which he put on himself, declining a helmet with the atom symbol.

== Fictional character biography ==
=== Origins ===
Jonathan Osterman is born in 1929 to a Jewish-American family of German descent. He plans to follow in his father's footsteps as a watchmaker, but when the U.S. drops the atomic bomb on Hiroshima, his father declares his profession outdated and forces Jon to work toward a career studying nuclear physics. This turning point foreshadows Doctor Manhattan's "exterior" perception of time as predetermined and all things within it as so determined, including Manhattan's reactions and emotions.

Jon attends Princeton University and graduates with a Ph.D. in atomic physics. In early 1959, he moves to a research base at Gila Flats, where experiments are being performed on the "intrinsic fields" of physical objects which, if tampered with, result in their disintegration. Here he meets Janey Slater, a fellow researcher; they eventually become lovers. During a visit to an amusement park in New Jersey, Janey's wristwatch breaks and Jon promises to fix it. A month later, Jon realizes he left the repaired watch in his lab coat inside a test chamber. When he goes inside to retrieve it the test chamber door closes behind him locking him inside. Researchers outside are unable to open the door or override the countdown, and the force of the generator tears Jon to pieces.

A series of strange events and ghostly appearances occur over the next few months, leading researchers to speculate that the area is haunted. After a series of partial bodily appearances, it becomes apparent that Jon is gradually reforming his body. Each time, the appearance lasts for only a few seconds: first a disembodied nervous system including the brain and eyes; then a circulatory system; and then a partially muscled skeleton. Jon eventually reappears as a blue-skinned man, glowing with a "flare of ultraviolet".

=== Before Watchmen ===
Jon gradually becomes a pawn of the U.S. government. He is given the code name "Doctor Manhattan"—a reference to the Manhattan Project—and a costume that he begrudgingly accepts. Manhattan chooses a representation of a hydrogen atom as his emblem. He declares that its simplicity kindles his respect; accordingly, he painlessly burns the mark into his forehead. This preference for material mechanisms marks the beginning of his declining humanity. Over time, he sheds uniform bit by bit. By the end of the 1970s, he refuses to wear clothing at all except during mandatory public appearances.

Manhattan's presence tips the balance of the Cold War in the West's favor, and as a result, U.S. foreign policy becomes more militaristic. At President Richard Nixon's request, he secures an American victory in the Vietnam War, which allows Nixon to repeal the 22nd Amendment and serve up to five terms. Far from solving underlying international tensions, Manhattan's presence exacerbates them while stifling their expression, which inevitably builds toward disaster.

Manhattan spends much of his time conducting research. He is single-handedly responsible for the shift to electric-powered vehicles, and Adrian Veidt credits him with causing a huge leap forward in a myriad of science and technology sectors. As a result, the technology of the alternative 1985 of the Watchmen universe is far more advanced. During the only meeting of the Crimebusters group, Manhattan becomes attracted to Laurie Juspeczyk, the second Silk Spectre. His relationship with Janey ends acrimoniously and he begins dating Laurie.

=== Events of Watchmen ===
At the start of Watchmen, Manhattan works at the Rockefeller Military Research Center, where he lives with Laurie. Rorschach informs them of the murder of Edward Blake, aka the Comedian, and warns them that all former costumed adventurers are being targeted by a "mask killer". Because he works for the U.S. government, Manhattan is exempt from a federal law outlawing costumed heroes. Manhattan dismisses Rorschach by teleporting him outside and encourages Laurie to go out with Dan Dreiberg, the second Nite Owl. A short time later, Manhattan attends Blake's funeral with Veidt and Dreiberg. He reflects on his association with Blake during the Vietnam War, and senses the presence of former villain, Moloch.

During a talk show appearance, a reporter ambushes Manhattan with allegations that he caused cancer in his former associates, including Janey. Seeking solitude, Manhattan transports himself to Mars. The Soviet Union exploits his absence by invading Afghanistan, sparking an international crisis. Eventually, Manhattan brings Laurie to Mars to discuss why he should aid humanity. Laurie inadvertently wins the argument after the shocking realization that her father is Blake, a man she despised for sexually assaulting her mother. Manhattan is amazed by the improbable events that occurred to result in the birth of Laurie, a chain of events he sees as a stunning "thermodynamic miracle". Realizing that such a miracle can apply to any living thing on Earth, Manhattan is persuaded to return to protect humanity, rather than disregarding it as insignificant.

In the movie version, it is discovered that Veidt framed Manhattan as part of his plot to avert World War III by simulating Manhattan's destructive power across the globe. In the comics, Veidt achieves the same end goal but by attacking New York with an engineered monster, killing half of the city in the process. Although Manhattan and Laurie return too late to stop Veidt, they teleport to his base in Antarctica to confront him. Veidt tries to disintegrate Manhattan, only to have Manhattan restore himself more quickly than Veidt expected. Upon seeing that Veidt's plan has averted war, Manhattan realizes that exposing him would be too dangerous for life on Earth and agrees to remain silent. Rorschach leaves intending to expose the truth, but Manhattan rebuffs and relents saying how his exposure of the events would undo the peace treaties. With that Rorschach cannot live with the knowledge, and begs for Manhattan to kill him, causing Manhattan to vaporize him. Manhattan decides to depart Earth again, suggesting that he desires to find a galaxy "less complicated than this one". When Veidt asks if his plan worked out in the end, Manhattan replies, "In the end? Nothing ends, Adrian. Nothing ever ends".

=== In the DC Universe ===
==== The New 52 and DC Rebirth ====
After departing from the Watchmen universe, Manhattan was aware of the DC Universe due to blindspots from Marionette and Mimes kid, blindspots that were related to the DC universe, later revealed as cosmic universal hope. Dr Manhattan in the DC universe learned there are cosmic forces beyond his understanding and as doomsday clock proceed he learns more and more about the different cosmic forces as well as the cosmic understanding, he learns hope is inside humanity and traveled there to find a place among those people and start a new life (Superman). But at some point, his visions showed him a confrontation with Superman, and then he saw "nothing". This revelation led Manhattan to try to modify the DC Universe's mainstream timeline to fix the fissures caused by the several Crises across the multiverse; unaware it was the doing of Perpetua to free herself from the Source Wall. However, those actions would not get the expected result and would lead to the creation of The New 52.

In the new timeline, it is speculated that Manhattan kills Owlman and Metron after the former tries to access the secrets of the universe. However, the Convergence caused by Brainiac and Telos restored the multiverse, bringing back the pre-Flashpoint timeline.

It's speculated that Manhattan used Abra Kadabra to trap Wally West within the Speed Force, and this modification in the timeline also caused the other speedsters Jesse Quick, Bart Allen, Jay Garrick, and Max Mercury to be removed from history and trapped in the Speed Force. However Wally was saved by Barry, therefore initiating the events of DC Rebirth. Barry and Batman later began investigating the unknown force behind these changes, learning from Lilith Clay that "Manhattan" was a prominent thought in Kadabra's mind when he claimed responsibility for removing Wally from history.

Eobard Thawne attacks Batman as he is studying a blood-stained smiley face button left embedded within the wall of the Batcave. When Thawne picks up the button, he is briefly teleported away, returning with the left half of his body charred to the bone. Just before his death, he claims to have seen "God". Using the cosmic treadmill to chase after the radiation emitted from the button in the timestream, Batman and Barry discover Thawne as he was trying to reach "God". Upon reaching the unseen figure, Thawne boosted his ability to exist as a paradox before he was vaporized by Manhattan, leaving only the button behind. Sometime later, Manhattan picks up the button as he recalls his dialogue with Laurie.

It is speculated that Manhattan puts Bruce Wayne in contact with the Flashpoint Thomas Wayne, who tells his son not to become Batman before his "death" and the destruction of the last of the Flashpoint timeline, prompting Bruce not to respond to the Bat-Signal the following night. Manhattan also saves Jor-El from the destruction of Krypton before conditioning him to see only the very worst of humanity. Jor-El assumes the identity of Mister Oz and tries to convince his son Kal-El to abandon Earth. However, when Jor-El begins to realize that he has been pushing his son too far, he is pulled away. Superman acknowledges Jor-El's warnings even as he rejects his misanthropy. All of which was to test the will and hope of the two major heroes of the DC Universes.

During the events of Heroes in Crisis, Batman suspects that the massacre at the Sanctuary might be related to Manhattan's actions. This theory was later proven to be partially true, as Wally gets in contact with Metron's Mobius Chair, which grants him part of Manhattan's powers.

==== Events of Doomsday Clock ====
During the events of Doomsday Clock, seven years after the events set in the Watchmen universe, Ozymandias (Adrian Veidt) is determined to find Manhattan to restore the world from the chaos after his previous plan for world peace was exposed by Rorschach's journal. Veidt narrates that he can track Manhattan because he leaks electrons, as his intrinsic field were stripped during his initial accident and an event caused by Veidt. Using the Owlship to the quantum tunnel, accompanied by Rorschach II, Marionette, and Mime, Veidt follows the electron trail left by Manhattan to the DC Universe where they land in Gotham City. Later, it is revealed that Manhattan is responsible for preventing the Comedian's death by teleporting him to the DC Universe.

Manhattan recalls various events in which he indirectly killed Alan Scott and thus brought about changes in the timeline. On July 16, 1940, Alan was riding on a train over a collapsing bridge, but he survived by grabbing onto a green lantern. He continues his life, eventually "sitting at a round table wearing a mask" and later testifying before the House Un-American Activities Committee but refusing to implicate anyone in his employ. On July 16, 1940, Manhattan moves the green lantern six inches out of his reach so that Alan dies in the train accident and leaves no family behind, as the green lantern is passed through different locations. At a fun house in the present time, Bubastis II begins glowing, so Ozymandias moves him closer to the lantern to let him feed on Manhattan's temporal energies left on the lantern and thereby force Manhattan to their current location. Manhattan immediately proceeds to transport himself and the Watchmen group away, separating them from Batman and Joker. He tells Ozymandias that he isn't returning to their world as he's in the middle of something. He reveals that he didn't kill Marionette in the robbery years back, because he saw what her child would do and that she is pregnant again. He also reveals that Ozymandias lied to Rorschach about having cancer, so Ozymandias admits to Rorschach that he deceived him and used him for his help. Manhattan then tells everyone that he came to the DC Universe looking for a place among them, but that he saw a vision of "the most hopeful among them. Heading toward [him]. Now hopeless," and then nothing in the future thereafter. Manhattan returns the team to the funhouse. He returns to Mars, reflecting on a vision set one month in his future: a confrontation with Superman that may result in Superman destroying Manhattan or Manhattan destroying everything.

On Mars, looking at a Legion Flight Ring that once belonged to Ferro Lad, Manhattan contemplates the events where Ferro Lad sacrificed his life to save Earth's sun and thereby caused his ring to careen through time, the events in which he moved Alan Scott's lantern and thereby caused the ring never to have existed, and his confrontation with Superman set one week from then. On Earth, Batman and Superman are recovering from a massive explosion, which has produced a fog of tachyon particles that obscures the immediate past and future to Manhattan. Meanwhile, after tracing the energy signature of the explosion to Mars, many of Earth's superheroes travel in several spaceships to Mars for a confrontation with the suspected perpetrator. However, Batman believes that they are being "played," as he is unsure if they have the right person. With the heroes surrounding Manhattan, Martian Manhunter telepathically broadcasts Manhattan's final vision of Superman to everyone. The heroes believe that Manhattan is trying to destroy Superman and all of them before Superman destroys him. As Manhattan easily deals with the attacks by the heroes, he curiously examines and discloses the nature of the emotional spectrum by dissecting Guy Gardner's power ring and stating that the magic used by the Justice League Dark is from the "scraps of Creation". To prove the point that even hope decays, he shows Ronnie Raymond that Martin Stein purposely caused the incident that merged the two into Firestorm to learn more about metahumans. Refusing to believe this, Ronnie attacks and harms Manhattan, upon which the heroes realize that Manhattan is not invulnerable and destroy him. However, Manhattan reconstitutes himself and incapacitates the heroes.

As he incapacitates the remaining heroes, Manhattan recounts the first time he arrived in the DC Universe on April 18, 1938. He meets Carver Colman. As they talk in a diner, Manhattan sees all moments of Carver's future until his death. Overhearing news of a mysterious man who lifted a car over his head, Manhattan leaves and witnesses the first appearance of the Golden Age Superman. From there, he witnesses the beginnings of Alan Scott/Green Lantern, Jay Garrick/The Flash, Hawkman, Atom, Doctor Fate, Sandman, Spectre, and Hourman, and the formation of the Justice Society of America. Manhattan then sees a different timeline where Superman was never a member of the JSA and first appeared in 1956 instead (Silver Age/Earth-1). Manhattan witnesses several variations of the death of Superman's foster parents: Jonathan and Martha Kent, the origins of Superman, and when a young Superboy met the Legion of Super-Heroes. To appease his curiosity, Manhattan moves the Green Lantern away from Alan, preventing the creation of the Green Lantern and the formation of the JSA, to see how the changes affect Superman. In doing this, Manhattan realizes that this universe is not part of the Multiverse, but is the Metaverse, with the Multiverse reacting to the changes within this universe (hence why there have been endless parallel worlds, none at all, 52 universes, and a Dark Multiverse). Having changed history in the Metaverse, he witnesses the first appearance of the New 52 Superman, he is confronted by Wally West of the pre-Flashpoint universe, who briefly escapes the Speed Force to warn him that he knows what Manhattan did and that the heroes of the DC Universe will stop him, before being dragged back into the Speed Force. Manhattan likens Wally's appearance to the Metaverse fighting back at the changes done to it, an innate hope that fights back to the surface. He returns to Carver Colman on June 8, 1954, 10 seconds before he is killed by his mother, and he thinks about the future he sees where Superman attacks him, believing that he will either die by Superman's hands or destroy the Metaverse. Back to the present day, Manhattan returns to Earth and ponders that he is a being of inaction on a collision course with a man of action (Superman), and to this universe of hope, he has become the villain.

After arriving on Earth, Manhattan meets Superman in person during Black Adam's invasion of the White House, with Ozymandias watching. Manhattan witnesses Superman's fight with Adam and Russia's superhero team called the People's Heroes. He eventually reveals to Superman that he is the one who has been tampering with reality and that he also caused the death of Jonathan and Martha Kent. Manhattan expects Superman to attack him, but Superman instead protects him from Pozhar and then tells him that he should use his powers for good. Manhattan is inspired by Superman's heroism and his pivotal role in the fabric of reality; he undoes part of his actions, as a result of the mechanic structure of the universe, much of the pre-New 52 timelines are restored. Many characters are brought back into existence, including Superman's parents. Manhattan also goes back in time and changes Carver Colman's future for the better. He then goes back to the Watchmen universe, bringing Rorschach and Ozymandias with him. Manhattan saves his Earth by making all nuclear weapons disappear. Afterward, he takes Mime and Marionette's infant son with him and proceeds to raise him on his own, so he will become their planet's equivalent to Superman. His final thought wanders to what his life could have been if he had not become Doctor Manhattan: Janey convinces him to not retrieve the watch so he is not involved in the incident that would have given him his powers; he marries Janey and they start a family together, having two daughters and a son, living a life without any worry of time. He smiles one last time, believing it to be a nice daydream to live in. Manhattan then erases himself from existence, transferring his life force to the Planet and his powers to Mime and Marionette's son. He leaves the boy—whom he has named Clark—to be adopted by the former Nite Owl and Silk Spectre.

==== After Doomsday Clock ====
During the events of Dark Nights: Death Metal, Wally West reveals Manhattan's energy is Connective Energy, and after he tried to undo his change in order to try to restore the DC Universe, the Quintessence's members used that same energy against Perpetua. The Batman Who Laughs takes Wally prisoner to get Manhattan's powers, but Wonder Woman suggests using both the Connective and Crisis Energies to create an "Anti-Crisis". In Death Metal, a "Final Bruce Wayne", an amalgamated version of Batman and Manhattan often referred to as "Batmanhattan", appears. The Batman Who Laughs transplants his brain into Batmanhattan's body to gain his powers.

== Characterization ==
=== Appearance ===
Doctor Manhattan's body is humanoid, and his build is tall and muscular. His height and relative size vary depending on his needs but generally remain above 1.83 m (6.0 ft) tall. He is completely blue (altering his shade and luminosity at will) and has no hair. On his forehead, he etched a stylized image of a hydrogen atom. He did this during preparations by the military for his unveiling to the general public. They presented him with a hat as a part of his uniform that had a group of crossed ellipses on it, intended to look like an atom but Jon did not see the resemblance. He replaced it with a symbol of his own, saying that if he were to have a symbol it should at least be one that he respects.

As Doctor Manhattan, his costume started as a black leotard, which presumably he created. As time progressed the costume shrank progressively to a pair of shorts, then a brief, then a thong; he eventually went on to wear nothing at all, since he had become indifferent to the need for clothing. The only purpose his original costume served was to make those around him (including the general public) more comfortable.

Before the experiment, Jon Osterman was a human of average height. He had brown hair and brown eyes. As a physicist, he often wore a suit.

=== Personality ===
Manhattan, though supremely powerful, suffers from a decreasing ability to relate to normal humans. Perhaps due to his perception of time and realization of a deterministic universe, he begins to show symptoms of apathy. From his radically altered perspective, almost all human concerns appear pointless and without obvious merit.

He describes Laurie as his only remaining link to humanity. This is demonstrated when the relationship ends, and Manhattan leaves Earth. This is also due to evidence coming to light that a number of those who were once close to him, including his former girlfriend Janey Slater, have come down with terminal cancer. Manhattan feels that he poses a threat to others, and he exiles himself to Mars, stating "I am tired of Earth, these people. I'm tired of being caught in the tangle of their lives". His interest in humanity is revived after he witnesses Laurie's epiphany that she is the daughter of the Comedian. It causes him to reflect on the sheer chance that life should come to be in any form, but after the Watchmen fail to prevent Ozymandias's destruction of New York, he departs Earth, commenting that he may explore new life in other parts of the galaxy.

In DC Rebirth #1, Pandora accuses her killer — currently thought to be Manhattan — of believing in skepticism, doubt, and corruption, proclaiming that he cannot understand the hope personified in the heroes of the DC Universe and that they will "prove [him] wrong".

His meddling with the DC Universe to satisfy his curiosity shows extreme apathy. He has altered the timeline so much, that several events and people were altered or wiped out. However, thanks to the Convergence, Wally West and Superman, much of the damage was undone, though Manhattan wasn't deterred from continuing his experiment. He erased the Golden Age by preventing Alan Scott from getting his powers and helping form the JSA, in the process erasing the Legion of Super-Heroes as well. He remained indifferent to a survivor who avoided erasure.

In the last Watchmen issue, Manhattan claimed that "nothing ends" despite Ozymandias succeeding in his plan for world peace. But in Doomsday Clock, Manhattan withdrew from what he previously said after witnessing the DC Universe's citizens losing their faith in their heroes, now affirming that "everything ends". His sole interest was in the moment Superman was to punch at him; a moment he couldn't see past. In irony, Manhattan was the antithesis of Superman, being a human who had lost all senses of humanity; while Superman was an alien who embodied the best of humanity.

When the foretold moment came, Manhattan revealed he was responsible for erasing Superman's loved ones; however, he was shocked that the punch was meant to knock away a villain behind him. Superman sought only to help and be better, which Manhattan saw as the answer; the entire DC multiverse created new worlds for Superman to be born in every era until the 31st century, when his ideals brought peace.

After restoring the JSA and Legion to existence, Manhattan decided his world and multiverse could use someone like Superman, but Manhattan himself was too detached from his humanity, so he would need to raise a child and impart his powers to him. To this end, he raises Clark Maez, Mime and Marionette's son, before leaving him to be adopted by his former teammates.

=== Powers and abilities ===
Jon is the only character in Watchmen to possess superpowers, save for the existence of psychics (none of whom engage in costumed heroics).

Throughout Watchmen, he is shown to be absolutely powerful and invulnerable to all harm; even when his body is disintegrated, he can reconstruct it in a matter of seconds and remains unharmed. He is capable of altering his size depending on his needs, for example, reconstructing himself in a much bigger form. He can hurl huge objects effortlessly with his hands. He is also unable to exhaust himself. Jon has complete awareness of and control over atomic and subatomic particles. He is also an omnikinetic. He does not need air, water, food, or sleep, and is immortal. He can teleport himself and others over limitless distances. He is capable of true flight, although he uses only levitation in most of his appearances. Due to his perception of time, he sees the past, present, and future simultaneously.

Jon can phase any part of his body through solid objects without damaging them, produce multiple copies of himself that function independently of each other, project destructive energy, instantaneously disintegrate people with a mere thought (seen when he did so to fleeing soldiers during the Vietnam War, possibly by nullifying their intrinsic fields which was the cause of his original death and was similar in appearance to the disintegration effect he uses) and generate impenetrable force fields. He can transmute, create, and destroy matter as well as transmute his body to any of a vast array of elemental compounds and form them to his will. He can alter the shapes and consistencies of these elements and combine them to form complex compounds. Additionally, he can shape parts and portions of his body instead of the whole. He can move objects without physically touching them (telekinesis), reverse entropy, repair anything, no matter how damaged. In addition, he has the ability to create life, or so he claims. He also attests to have walked on the surface of the sun. At one point it is stated that, in the event of a nuclear war, he would be capable of destroying Soviet nuclear missiles while at the same time 'destroying' large areas of Russia. As a result of these capabilities, Jon becomes central to the United States Cold War strategy of deterrence.

He is also capable of manipulating reality to some extent through the use of time manipulation, as seen when he unaware of the consequences erased ten years from the DC Universe when Barry Allen tried to bring his original universe back to normal. Jon's intervention caused The New 52 timeline to be formed after Perpetua recreated the multiverse, within which most superheroes are younger and less experienced, and most of them lose their most important relationships before they begin. However, despite his immense power, he was unable to erase or permanently kill Eobard Thawne, the Reverse-Flash.

In the DC Universe, Manhattan's power is revealed to be glowing with Connective Energy, the opposite of Crisis Energy. And his powers are more limited compared to his native universe, with Doomsday Clock revealing that he is not invulnerable or omniscient.

==== Scientific accuracy ====
In the 2009 film adaptation Watchmen, physics professor James Kakalios of the University of Minnesota was used as a scientific consultant, and shed light on the potential scientific explanations of Manhattan's powers both in the film and the comic.

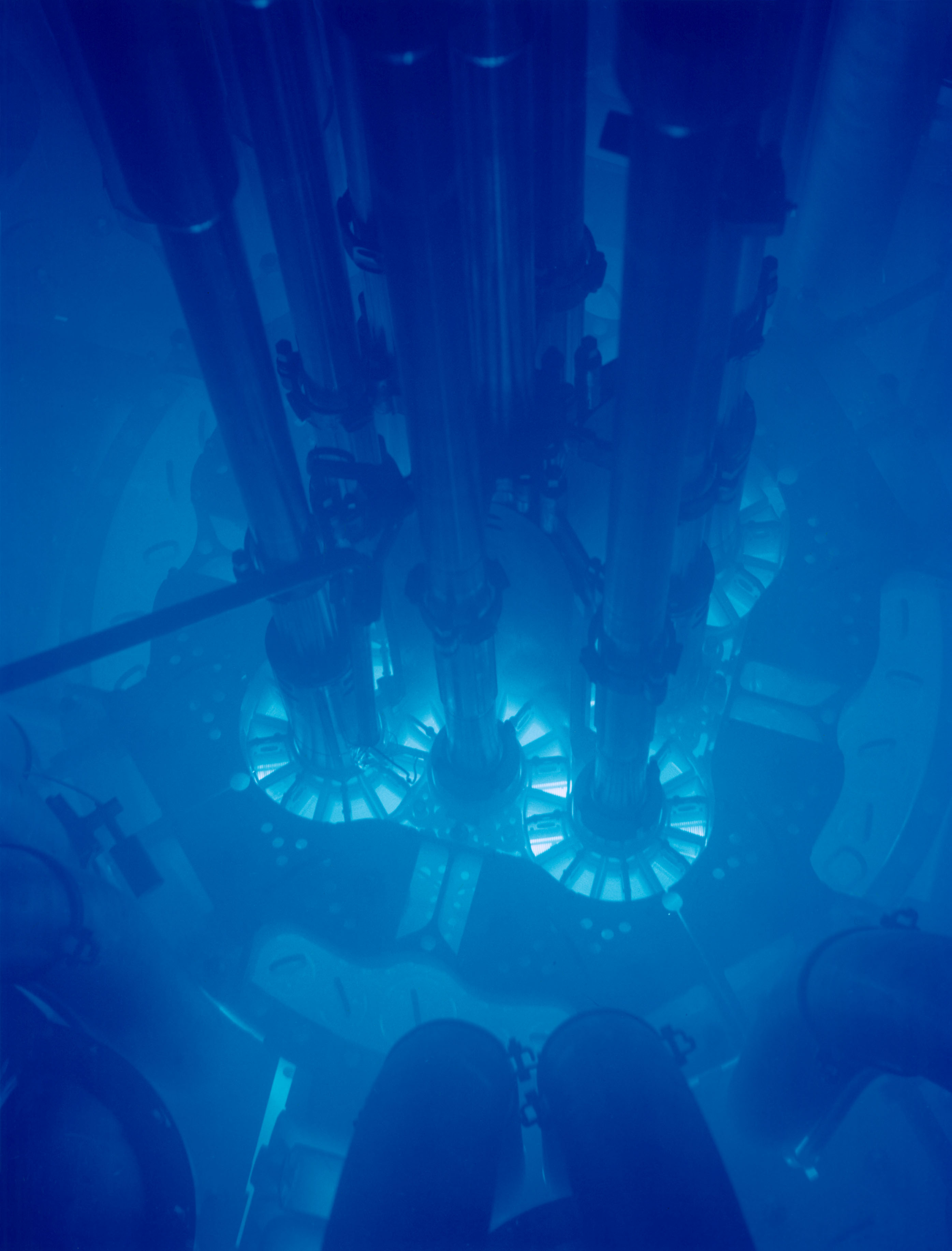
Cherenkov radiation inspired Doctor Manhattan's appearance in the 2009 film adaptation.

Kakalios explained that the intrinsic field has a basis in reality in that it is a representation of a collection of electromagnetic, and strong and weak nuclear forces. Kakalios explained that if a being were able to manipulate matter, such a being would have complete control over these three forces; hence, the "intrinsic field" would exist. Kakalios also explained that while it is unlikely, Manhattan's teleportation abilities seemingly could be achieved through quantum tunnelling, should Manhattan have control over his probability wave functions.

=== Philosophical implications ===
The character of Doctor Manhattan invokes thought on the philosophy of metaphysics. There are various themes addressed throughout the Watchmen series from philosophy of time and eternalism, to determinism and its relationship to ethics, to addressing questions such as "What does it mean to be human?" and "Do the ends justify the means?"

The character is primarily cited as the representation of the potential side effects and dangers of a superintelligence, which include detachment from the rest of humanity and potential characteristics of apathy.

== In other media ==
=== Television ===
- Doctor Manhattan appears in Watchmen: Motion Comic, where he, along with every other character in the series, is voiced by Tom Stechschulte.
- Doctor Manhattan appears in Watchmen (2019), primarily portrayed by Yahya Abdul-Mateen II, with his original form portrayed by Darrell Snedeger and his younger self by Zak Rothera-Oxley. He first appears as Cal Abar, who is the husband of Angela Abar, a.k.a. Sister Night. It is revealed that despite his progressive detachment from (and growth beyond) humanity, Manhattan has reversed course and once again desired love and a relationship with a woman. He is eventually destroyed, but, it is implied that he transferred some of his powers to Angela.

=== Film ===
Billy Crudup wearing facial markers to track facial expressions

Doctor Manhattan (portrayed by Billy Crudup/Greg Plitt) in the 2009 film adaptation

- Doctor Manhattan appears in Watchmen (2009), portrayed by Billy Crudup with Greg Plitt's physical likeness, while Jaryd Heidrick portrays his younger self in flashbacks. In the film, Ozymandias uses Manhattan's energy research to destroy several large cities across the globe, framing him and using him as a scapegoat to attain peace. Jon corners Adrian at Karnak and like in the books, leaves Laurie for Mars, having killed Rorschach.
- Doctor Manhattan appears in Watchmen (2024), voiced by Michael Cerveris.

=== Video games ===
Doctor Manhattan appears in Watchmen: The End Is Nigh, voiced by Crispin Freeman.

== References in other works ==
In Final Crisis #2, the exiled Monitor Nix Uotan sketches a character resembling Doctor Manhattan. Grant Morrison stated in an interview that the Final Crisis two-part series Superman: Beyond will feature "Captain Atom from Earth 4, which is kind of a weird amalgam of the original Charlton universe and this kind of Watchmen parallel world". This character is named 'Captain Adam', and appears in Superman Beyond #1. He is blue-skinned with the hydrogen atom mark of Doctor Manhattan, and is addicted to drugs which keep his "quantum senses" in check. When he is off the drugs, he becomes similar to Doctor Manhattan in demeanor and powers, duplicating himself hundreds of times over to repair the Bleed Starship and allow the various Supermen to pilot the Thought-Robot Armor, which itself is confirmed to grant one powers capable of beating Captain Adam. However, even when he is using his full potential without the aid of drugs, Captain Adam has difficulty controlling his powers - unlike Doctor Manhattan.
