= Jason Rusch =

Firestorm
- Jason Rusch as Firestorm. Art by Jamal Igle

Publication information
- Publisher: DC Comics
- First appearance: Firestorm (vol. 3) #1 (July 2004)
- Created by: Dan Jolley; ChrisCross (based on the Firestorm character created by Gerry Conway and Al Milgrom)

In-story information
- Alter ego: Jason Thomas Rusch
- Team affiliations: LexCorp; Justice League; S.T.A.R. Labs
- Abilities: Superhuman strength and durabilty; Energy projection and manipulation; Intangibility; High-speed flight; Energy absorption; Matter transmutation; Density control; Molecular reconstruction; Eidetic memory; Enhanced vision; X-ray vision; Microscopic vision; Thermal vision; Regeneration; Self-sustenance; Phasing; Psychic link; Transformation

Jason Thomas Rusch is a superhero in the DC Comics Universe, and the second character known as Firestorm. He first appeared in Firestorm (vol. 3) #1 (July 2004), and was created by Dan Jolley and ChrisCross.

== Publication history ==
The Jason Rusch incarnation of Firestorm was introduced in 2004 following the death of the original Firestorm, Ronnie Raymond, in Identity Crisis.

Ronnie and Jason star in The New 52 title The Fury of Firestorm: The Nuclear Men, initially written by Gail Simone and Ethan Van Sciver and drawn by Yıldıray Çınar. Joe Harris replaced Simone starting in issue #7, while Van Sciver provided art for issues #7 and 8. Dan Jurgens took over the series as both writer and artist from issue #13 in 2012 until the final issue, #20, in 2013.

== Fictional character biography ==
Jason is a 17-year-old living in Detroit who wants nothing more than to escape his home city. He lives with his father Alvin Rusch, who had turned abusive after losing one of his hands in an industrial accident. His mother left the family sometime after the accident. With the loss of a job he needed for college tuition, Jason turns to a local thug for money, accepting a job as a courier. He later encounters the Firestorm matrix, searching for a new host after the death of Ronnie Raymond, the previous Firestorm. In the aftermath, Jason struggles to cope with his new identity and powers, leading to the death of the man who had hired him.

Shortly after Jason's 18th birthday, he is kidnapped by the new Secret Society of Super Villains for use as a power source in a hidden complex. There, Jason meets the mysterious girl Gehenna. The two are freed when the Secret Six raid the complex.

In One Year Later, Jason and Gehenna search for Martin Stein after his former pupil Adrian Burroughs kidnaps him. Later, Jason and Stein meet Shilo Norman, who informs them that the Firestorm matrix contains part of the Life Equation. After Darkseid kidnaps Stein, Jason and Gehenna work to find him.

=== Infinite Crisis ===
The 2006 storyline Infinite Crisis reveals that Stein is alive in space as the "Elemental Firestorm". He had sensed the presence of Jason within the Firestorm matrix, but was unaware of Ronnie's death. When Jason, as Firestorm, is gravely injured, Stein links with him, promising Jason a new Firestorm body to let him return into battle and asking about Ronnie's fate.

Accepting Martin's proposal, Jason asks Stein to become the permanent second member of the Firestorm matrix. Sensing his "errors" are the result of his youth and lack of experience, Jason seeks the experience and maturity of Stein. Stein refuses at first, but later accepts Jason's request, thus ensuring both a new Firestorm body and the reconstruction of human bodies for them both.

=== 52 ===
In the 2006–2007 weekly series 52, it is revealed that Firestorm was fused with Cyborg due to malfunctioning Zeta Beam technology. Unmerged after several weeks, Jason, as Firestorm, attempts to reform and lead a new Justice League, along with Firehawk, Ambush Bug, Super-Chief, and Bulleteer. After failing to handle a time-displacement crisis staged by Skeets, the new League disbands, straining Jason's already shaky friendship with Firehawk. Finally, during the World War III event versus Black Adam, Jason settles all differences with Firehawk, rekindling their friendship and asking for her powers, necessary to activate Firestorm after the mysterious disappearance of Stein.

=== "One Year Later" ===
As the storyline jumps ahead one year, Stein has mysteriously vanished, and Jason has been merging with Firehawk to become Firestorm, allowing him to use her powers as well. The two decide to look for Stein together and eventually learn that he has been kidnapped and tortured by the Pupil (Adrian Burroughs), his former teaching assistant. Flanked by the D.O.L.L.I.s, a group of cyborg soldiers with limited cognitive ability, the Pupil questions Stein about the secrets of the universe. Jason and Firehawk, along with Gehenna, free the captured Stein and restore him to full health. Jason is a college freshman at New York City's Columbus University and seems to have ties with Dani Sharpe, a member of the senior staff at LexCorp.

The Firestorm team of Jason and Firehawk made several appearances before the search for Martin Stein ended. This included dealing with the latest OMAC and teaming up with Superman in the "Back in Action" story arc in Action Comics. Firehawk later introduces Jason to Pozhar, a Russian superhero who was once part of the Firestorm matrix; together, the trio take on a reborn Tokamak.

=== Blackest Night ===
In the 2009–2010 Blackest Night miniseries, Ronnie Raymond is resurrected as a member of the Black Lantern Corps and confronts Barry Allen and Hal Jordan alongside Hawkman, Hawkgirl, Elongated Man, Sue Dibny, and Martian Manhunter. Ronnie attacks Jason and Gehenna before absorbing Jason into the Firestorm matrix, ripping Gehenna's heart out, and transforming her body into salt. Ronnie absorbs Jason's anger over Gehenna's death, providing the Black Lanterns with even more emotional energies. Ronnie goes on to attack Barry and co. at the Justice League satellite, but Jason briefly asserts himself, allowing the heroes to escape. Ronnie regains control and proceeds to absorb Jason's willpower. In the final battle against Nekron, Ronnie is restored to life alongside Jason and the two are separated, with Ronnie having no memory of his time as a Black Lantern.

=== Brightest Day ===
In the 2010–2011 Brightest Day miniseries, Ronnie arrives at Jason's apartment with Stein and Ray Palmer to attend Gehenna's funeral. Stein and Palmer discuss Ronnie's return and how he no longer remembers anything that happened between his death and resurrection. While the two talk about the paperwork needed to have Ronnie's legal status as "dead" reversed, Ronnie approaches Jason and offers an apology about Gehenna's murder. Jason refuses to accept it and argues with Ronnie, which causes them to merge into a new Firestorm form. Palmer manages to separate Jason and Ronnie, but not before the Firestorm matrix causes a huge explosion, transforming everything in Stein's laboratory into salt.

Some time after the forceful separation, Ronnie and Jason notice a third entity lurking in the Firestorm matrix. As Firestorm, Ronnie and Jason visit Stein in an attempt to find out what is happening to them. Stein reveals to them that the Black Lantern variation still exists in the Firestorm matrix. The Life Entity tells Ronnie and Jason that they must learn from each other and defeat the Black Lantern before it can destroy the Entity.

After running a test, Stein reveals the origin of the Firestorm matrix. Stein believes that during his initial experiments, he captured the spark that preceded the Big Bang, thereby making the Firestorm matrix a trigger for a new Big Bang. If Jason and Ronnie continue to experience emotional imbalance, they increase the likelihood of triggering a new Big Bang. After Stein explains this, the voice inside them speaks again and stands before them, now calling itself Deathstorm.

Deathstorm reveals its plan to Stein, stating that it intends to create enough emotional instability between Ronnie and Jason that the Firestorm matrix will trigger another Big Bang, destroying all life in the universe. Deathstorm absorbs Stein's mind to use his knowledge of Ronnie against him, then absorbs Jason's father Alvin.

Deathstorm teleports to an unknown location, while Jason and Ronnie seek help from the Justice League. Firestorm is placed in a containment chamber while the League search for a way to stabilize the energy. An internal argument between Ronnie and Jason ignites the spark, transporting them to the antimatter universe of Qward. Meanwhile, Deathstorm and the Black Lanterns deliver the White Lantern Battery to the Anti-Monitor. When Ronnie and Jason confront him, Deathstorm brings Stein out of the Firestorm matrix to taunt the two with. Deathstorm attempts to turn Jason and Ronnie into salt, but Stein takes the brunt of the attack and dies. Jason and Ronnie decide to truly work together to avenge Stein's death. The Entity declares that Ronnie has accomplished his mission, creating a burst of white energy that obliterates the Black Lanterns, returns Jason's father to his home, and deposits Firestorm in the Star City forest.

=== The New 52 ===
After the events of the 2011 Flashpoint storyline, The New 52 reality altered Firestorm's personal history to the point of being completely restarted; Ronnie Raymond is now introduced as a high school senior and the captain of the football team. During a terrorist attack on their school, Jason Rusch gives his classmate a vial that he obtained from Martin Stein, which contains the "god particle", one of Stein's creations. The particle transforms both Jason and Ronnie into Firestorm, and the two teens briefly battle each other before accidentally merging into a creature known as Fury. Sharing the identity of Firestorm, with Ronnie being the brawn and Jason being the brains, Firestorm is considered for recruitment into the Justice League along with several other heroes.

In the 2016 miniseries Legends of Tomorrow, Jason is separated from the Firestorm matrix after Stein mistakenly believes that it is harming him. However, he continues to appear in association with Firestorm and eventually rejoins the matrix.

The 2026 series revisits Jason, revealing that he has not been part of the Firestorm matrix for over a year. Firehawk approaches him to help stop the Firestorm matrix after it attains sentience. Jason refuses, wanting to focus on his own life, but directs Firehawk to New York to find Martin Stein.

== Other versions ==
An alternate timeline version of Jason Rusch appears in Flashpoint: Legion of Doom #1, where he is killed by Heat Wave.

== In other media ==
=== Television ===
- Jason Rusch / Firestorm appears in Batman: The Brave and the Bold, voiced by Tyler James Williams. This version is a high school student who became Firestorm alongside his teacher Ronnie Raymond after they are exposed to supercharged nuclear energy during an explosion caused by Doctor Double X. Additionally, his suit is a containment suit that limits his energy and prevents it from harming others.
- Jason Rusch appears in The Flash episode "Revenge of the Rogues", portrayed by Luc Roderique. This version is one of several scientists who worked on Martin Stein's F.I.R.E.S.T.O.R.M. matrix. After the U.S. army takes over the project following Stein's disappearance and S.T.A.R. Labs' particle accelerator explosion, Rusch begins working at Mercury Labs.

=== Film ===
- Jason Rusch / Firestorm appears in Justice League: Crisis on Two Earths, voiced by Cedric Yarbrough.
- Jason Rusch / Firestorm appears in Lego DC Comics Super Heroes: The Flash, voiced by Phil LaMarr.

=== Video games ===
- Jason Rusch / Firestorm appears as a character summon in Scribblenauts Unmasked: A DC Comics Adventure.
- Jason Rusch / Firestorm appears in Injustice 2, voiced by Ogie Banks. This version is an ally of Batman who works to restore order to Earth after the fall of Superman's Regime.
- Jason Rusch / Firestorm appears as a playable character in Lego DC Super-Villains.
