= Martin Stein =

- Martin Stein as depicted in Firestorm the Nuclear Man #1 (March 1978). Art by Al Milgrom.

Publication information
- Publisher: DC Comics
- First appearance: Firestorm the Nuclear Man #1 (March 1978)
- Created by: Gerry Conway; Al Milgrom

In-story information
- Species: Metahuman
- Team affiliations: Justice League; Department of Metahuman Affairs
- Abilities: Genius-level intellect; Expertise in physics

Martin Stein is a character appearing in American comic books published by DC Comics. He is commonly associated with, and sometimes is, the superhero Firestorm. Stein was originally portrayed as one half of Firestorm alongside Ronnie Raymond, acting as a mentor to Ronnie, and has also acted as Firestorm on his own.

Stein has made several appearances in DC-related media. He is portrayed by Victor Garber in the Arrowverse and voiced by Stephen Tobolowsky in Justice League Action.

== Publication history ==
Martin Stein first appeared in Firestorm the Nuclear Man #1 (March 1978), and was created by Gerry Conway and Al Milgrom.

Stein was originally portrayed as one half of Firestorm alongside Ronnie Raymond, acting as a mentor to Ronnie. In the 1980s and 1990s, Stein acted as the sole Firestorm after learning that he was always intended to be Earth's Fire Elemental. In the 2006 series Infinite Crisis, Stein returned to Earth and began working with Jason Rusch, the second Firestorm.

In the 2019 series Doomsday Clock, Firestorm's origin underwent a retcon, revealing that Martin Stein is the head of the Department of Metahuman Affairs and orchestrated the incident that transformed him and Ronnie Raymond into Firestorm in an effort to study and weaponize metahumans.

== Fictional character biography ==
Nobel Prize-winning physicist Martin Stein was caught in an accident that allowed him to fuse into Firestorm the "Nuclear Man" with student Ronnie Raymond. Due to Stein being unconscious during the accident, Ronnie was prominently in command of the Firestorm form with Stein a voice of reason inside his mind, able to offer Ronnie advice on how to use their powers without having any control over Firestorm. Banter between the two was a hallmark of their adventures. Stein was initially completely unaware of their dual identity, leaving him concerned about his unusual disappearances and blackouts, but Ronnie was eventually able to convince him of the truth, allowing them to bond as separate individuals rather than as parts of a whole.

After the accident, Firestorm took to defending New York City from such threats as Multiplex and Killer Frost. The 1982 series began with the teenaged Raymond adjusting to this role and later delved into the issue of the nuclear arms race. The Fury of Firestorm slowly developed the lives of Raymond and Stein, as Raymond struggled with high school and moved towards graduation, and Stein found a life outside the lab after learning about his bond with Raymond. The series also tried to create a sense of fun, something that Gerry Conway felt was missing during his years writing Spider-Man; the banter between Raymond and Stein contributed to this. Upon graduation from high school, Raymond entered college in Pittsburgh, where Stein had been hired as a professor. Afterward, together they searched for a cure for their bond.

When Conway left the series in 1986, John Ostrander (with artist Joe Brozowski) began writing the Firestorm stories. His first major story arc pitted Firestorm against the world as the hero, acting on a suggestion from a terminally ill Martin Stein, demanded that the United States and the Soviet Union destroy all of their nuclear weapons. After confrontations with the Justice League and most of his enemies, Firestorm faces the Russian nuclear superhero Pozhar in the Nevada desert, where an atomic bomb was dropped on them. A new Firestorm is created, composed of Raymond and Pozhar and controlled by the disembodied amnesiac mind of Stein.

The Firestorm with Arkadin proved to be a transitional phase, as in 1989 Ostrander fundamentally changed the character of Firestorm by revealing that Firestorm was a "Fire Elemental". By the series' 100th issue, Stein learned that he was destined to be the true Fire Elemental and would have been were it not for Raymond also being there by circumstance. Raymond and Arkadin were returned to their old lives, and Stein as Firestorm was accidentally exiled to deep space in the process of saving Earth. He thereafter spent many years traveling through space as a wanderer, rarely returning to Earth.

The 2006 miniseries Infinite Crisis revealed that Stein was alive in space as the "Elemental Firestorm", had sensed the presence of Jason Rusch within the Firestorm matrix, but was unaware of Ronnie's death during Identity Crisis. When Jason, as Firestorm, is gravely wounded in the line of duty, Stein links with Jason in a variation of the merge, promising Jason a new Firestorm form to return into battle. Accepting Martin's proposal, Jason asks Stein to become the permanent second member of the Firestorm matrix. Sensing that his "errors" were the result of his youth and lack of experience, Jason sought the experience and maturity of Stein. Stein refused at first, but later accepted Jason's request, thus ensuring both a new Firestorm form and the reconstruction of human bodies for both Jason and Stein.

Rusch and Stein meet Shilo Norman, who informs them that the Firestorm matrix contains one-quarter of the Life Equation. Darkseid fears that the Life Equation might challenge him and the Anti-Life Equation. Stein is separated from the matrix, then vanishes. Jason, with Gehenna as a "hidden partner" in their fusion, begins searching for the missing Stein.

As the storyline jumps ahead one year (and the series is retitled as Firestorm the Nuclear Man from issue #23 on), it is revealed that Stein had been kidnapped and tortured by Adrian Burroughs, his former teaching assistant. Flanked by the D.O.L.L.I.s, cyborg soldiers with limited cognitive ability, Burroughs questions Stein about the secrets of the universe. Jason, Firehawk, and Gehenna free the captured Stein and heal him.

=== Brightest Day ===
Stein returns in the 2010 series Brightest Day, where he reunites with a resurrected Ronnie Raymond. While recovering in the hospital, Stein explains to Ronnie that it seems to be dangerous to fuse into Firestorm again. As Firestorm, Ronnie and Jason visit Stein in an attempt to find out what is happening to them. Stein reveals to them that Ronnie's Black Lantern self Deathstorm, who was thought to be destroyed following his resurrection, still exists in the Firestorm matrix. Firestorm is then told by the Life Entity that they must learn from each other and defeat Deathstorm before he destroys the Life Entity.

After running a test, Stein reveals the origin of the Firestorm matrix. Stein believes that, during the initial experiment, he was able to capture the spark that preceded the Big Bang, thereby making the Firestorm matrix a trigger for a similar one. If the boys continue to experience emotional imbalance, they increase the likelihood of triggering a new Big Bang. Deathstorm emerges from the Firestorm matrix and reveals its plan to Stein, stating that it intends to create enough emotional instability between Ronnie and Jason that the matrix will trigger another Big Bang, destroying all life in the universe. To help accomplish this goal, Deathstorm absorbs Stein's mind to use his knowledge of Ronnie against him. While confronting Firestorm, Deathstorm brings Stein out of the matrix to taunt him. Stein takes an attack from Deathstorm meant for Ronnie and dies.

=== The New 52 ===
After the events of the 2011 Flashpoint storyline, The New 52 relaunch rebooted the continuity of the DC universe. Martin Stein is depicted as a scientist who created the "God Particle" and is uninvolved with Ronnie Raymond and Jason Rusch, who obtain the God Particle and become Firestorm together.

=== DC Rebirth ===
The DC Rebirth relaunch restored a version of Firestorm's original backstory to continuity. Doomsday Clock reveals that Stein is the head of the Department of Metahuman Affairs and engineered the incident that transformed himself and Ronnie Raymond into Firestorm to research metahumans. After learning of this information from Doctor Manhattan, Ronnie no longer trusts Stein, prompting him to work as Firestorm on his own. The later series The Fury of Firestorm establishes that Ronnie Raymond worked as an assistant to Stein while attending the University of Pittsburgh and that Stein was motivated to form the Department of Metahuman Affairs after his son and his classmates were killed by Doctor Polaris. Stein is recruited by Firehawk to stop the Firestorm matrix after it attains sentience.

== Other versions ==
An alternate universe version of Martin Stein appears in the "Trinity War" storyline. This version experimented on humans to unlock the secret of life through death, resulting in him transforming into Deathstorm and becoming a member of the Crime Syndicate of America. He is killed by Mazahs who steals his powers.

== In other media ==
=== Television ===
- Martin Stein / Firestorm appears in Super Friends: The Legendary Super Powers Show, voiced by Olan Soule. This version gained his powers from a molecular fusion experiment that went awry.
- Martin Stein / Firestorm appears in The Super Powers Team: Galactic Guardians, voiced by Ken Sansom.
- Martin Stein / Firestorm was intended to appear in Justice League Unlimited, with writer/producer Dwayne McDuffie stating that the series' creators had permission from DC Comics to use the character, but were unable to create a story that they liked. Later on, it was stated that the character was intended to be the focus of "The Greatest Story Never Told", but was replaced with Booster Gold.
- Martin Stein / Firestorm appears in Justice League Action, voiced by Stephen Tobolowsky. This version is a college friend of Mister Terrific who became Firestorm during an attack on the Hudson plant by bandits seeking plutonium.

=== Arrowverse ===
Martin Stein / Firestorm appears in media set in The CW's Arrowverse, portrayed by Victor Garber.

- First appearing in the live-action TV series The Flash, this version developed the F.I.R.E.S.T.O.R.M. matrix before he was exposed to dark matter energy amidst the explosion of Harrison Wells' particle accelerator and presumed dead. As a result, Stein became fused with his matrix and Ronnie Raymond. Stein initially holds primary control over their fused form until Team Flash develops a way to safely separate them. Following this, Stein and Raymond master their powers and assist the Flash in fighting the Reverse-Flash until Raymond sacrifices himself to close a singularity that opened over Central City. Afterward, Stein continues to assist Team Flash until the F.I.R.E.S.T.O.R.M. matrix begins to destabilize without a partner of the same blood type, endangering his life. Eventually, Team Flash find Stein's new partner in Jefferson "Jax" Jackson and the pair leave Central City to master their powers.
- Stein appears in the animated web series Vixen.
- Stein appears in the live-action series Legends of Tomorrow, with Graeme McComb portraying a younger version of the character. In the first season, Stein and Jax are recruited by Rip Hunter to join his Legends and defeat Vandal Savage. Amidst the team's mission, Stein is captured by and forcibly fused with Valentina Vostok, who intends to use his powers to create a Soviet Firestorm, but he escapes with Jax's help. By the season finale, Stein and Jax develop the ability to transmute matter and use it to foil Savage's plot to undo history. In the second season, Stein helps his teammates combat the Legion of Doom, encounters his past self, and inadvertently causes timeline changes that grant him a daughter named Lily Stein. Despite initially viewing Lily as a time paradox, he eventually comes to accept her. By the third season, Stein has become a grandfather after Lily has a son named Ronnie, prompting Ray Palmer and Team Flash to develop a formula to remove his powers so he can spend time with his family. During the "Crisis on Earth-X" crossover, Stein is fatally injured while helping the Legends and Earth-1's heroes defeat Nazis from Earth-X and drinks the formula to prevent Jax from dying alongside him.

=== Video games ===
- Martin Stein / Firestorm appears as a playable character in Injustice 2, voiced by Fred Tatasciore. This version is an ally of Batman who works to help him restore order following the fall of Superman's Regime.
- Martin Stein / Deathstorm appears as a playable character in Lego DC Super-Villains, voiced by Lex Lang.
