= Ronnie Raymond =

DC Comics superhero

Firestorm
- Ronnie Raymond as depicted in Firestorm the Nuclear Man #1 (March 1978). Art by Al Milgrom.

Publication information
- Publisher: DC Comics
- First appearance: Firestorm #1 (March 1978)
- Created by: Gerry Conway (writer); Al Milgrom (artist)

In-story information
- Alter ego: Ronald Roy "Ronnie" Raymond
- Species: Metahuman
- Team affiliations: Justice League; Power Company; Extreme Justice
- Abilities: Elemental transmutation; Intangibility; Energy projection and absorption; Flight; Enhanced strength, endurance, and resilience; "Quark vision"

Ronald Roy "Ronnie" Raymond is a character appearing in comics published by DC Comics. He is one of several characters called Firestorm and is normally fused together with Martin Stein or Jason Rusch. He first appeared in Firestorm the Nuclear Man #1 (March 1978), and was created by writer Gerry Conway and artist Al Milgrom.

Ronnie Raymond has made several appearances in DC-related media, such as The Flash, in which he is portrayed by Robbie Amell. Additionally, Mark L. Taylor, Bill Fagerbakke, and P. J. Byrne have voiced the character in animation.

== Publication history ==
The first Firestorm series was short-lived, canceled abruptly in a company-wide cutback (the "DC Implosion") with #5 (the first part of a multiple-issue story) the last to be distributed, and #6 included in Cancelled Comic Cavalcade. Gerry Conway added Firestorm to the roster of Justice League of America. This led to a series of eight-page stories in the back of The Flash (with art by George Pérez), and a revival of a monthly Firestorm comic in 1982. The Fury of Firestorm (later called Firestorm the Nuclear Man) lasted from 1982 until 1990.

Ronnie Raymond was killed by Shadow Thief during the Identity Crisis event in 2004 and succeeded by Jason Rusch. Raymond was resurrected in the Brightest Day event in 2010, with both him and Rusch appearing as Firestorm in The New 52 series The Fury of Firestorm: The Nuclear Men. The series was written by Gail Simone and Ethan Van Sciver and drawn by Yıldıray Çınar.

== Fictional character biography ==
The original Firestorm was distinguished by his integrated dual identity. High school student Ronnie Raymond and Nobel Prize-winning physicist Martin Stein were caught in an accident that allowed them to fuse into Firestorm. Due to Stein being unconscious during the accident, Ronnie is prominently in command of the Firestorm form with Stein a voice of reason inside his mind, able to offer Ronnie advice on how to use their powers without having any control over Firestorm himself. Banter between the two was a hallmark of their adventures. Stein was initially completely unaware of their dual identity, leaving him concerned about his unusual disappearances and blackouts, but Ronnie was eventually convinces Stein of the truth, allowing them to bond as separate individuals rather than as parts of a whole.

The 1982 Firestorm series, called The Fury of Firestorm, involves Ronnie adjusting to his role as a hero and later delves into the issue of the nuclear arms race. Ronnie eventually graduates high school and Stein finds a life outside his work. A second nuclear hero, Firehawk, is introduced as a love interest for Firestorm in 1984. In the same year, the character of Felicity Smoak was introduced, initially having a combative relationship with Ronnie. Felicity later becomes Ronnie's stepmother following her marriage to his father Ed. The series also tried to create a sense of fun, something that Gerry Conway felt was missing during his years writing Spider-Man; the banter between Ronnie and Stein contributed to this. Upon graduation from high school, Ronnie enters college in Pittsburgh, where Stein has been hired as a professor. Together, they search for a cure for their bond.

When Conway left the series in 1986, John Ostrander (with artist Joe Brozowski) began writing the Firestorm stories. His first major story arc pitted Firestorm against the world as he, acting on a suggestion from the terminally ill Stein, demands that the United States and the Soviet Union destroy all of their nuclear weapons. After confrontations with the Justice League and most of his enemies, Firestorm faces the Russian nuclear superhero Pozhar in the Nevada desert, where an atomic bomb is dropped on them. A new Firestorm is created, composed of Firestorm and Pozhar, but controlled by the disembodied amnesiac mind of Stein.

In 1989, Ostrander fundamentally changed the character of Firestorm by revealing that Firestorm was a "Fire Elemental". Firestorm becomes an environmental crusader, formed from Ronnie, Arkadin and Svarozhich, a Soviet clone of the previous Firestorm, but with a new mind. Stein is no longer part of the Firestorm matrix, but continues to play a supporting role, with the focus being on the radically different Firestorm. New artist Tom Mandrake would create a new look to match. In Ostrander's run, Firestorm meets and befriends Shango and the Orishas, the elemental gods of Nigeria. He also meets their chief deity and Shango's older brother Ọbatala, Lord of the White Cloth.

By the series' 100th issue, Stein learns that he was intended to be the true Fire Elemental and that Ronnie was never intended to gain superpowers. Stein becomes the sole Firestorm and leaves for deep space, while Ronnie and Arkadin lose their powers.

After the transition to the elemental Firestorm, all of the main characters from the series vanished from the comics for some time after the cancellation of the Firestorm comic in 1990. Ronnie eventually returned in the pages of Extreme Justice. Ronnie, at the time undergoing treatment for leukemia, regains his powers after a chemotherapy session. It takes the combined might of the Justice League led by Captain Atom and Martin Stein to restore Ronnie's health. Firestorm appears regularly in a number of DC titles, though lacking the guidance and knowledge necessary to use his skills wisely. Firestorm later joins a backup Justice League team as well as Power Company.

During the 2004 storyline Identity Crisis, Ronnie is killed by Shadow Thief, with Jason Rusch subsequently replacing him as the host of the Firestorm matrix. In the 2009–2010 Blackest Night miniseries, Ronnie is revived as a Black Lantern and kills Gehenna, Jason's girlfriend. He goes on to attack the Justice League satellite. Jason then briefly asserts himself, allowing the heroes to escape, before Ronnie regains control. Like other Black Lanterns, the undead Firestorm mimics Ronnie's personality, often wisecracking and exhibiting other stereotypical teenage behavior. In the final battle against Nekron, Ronnie is restored to life alongside Jason.

In the 2010–2011 Brightest Day miniseries, Ronnie and Jason begin operating together as Firestorm and learn that the Black Lantern variation still exists within the Firestorm matrix as a separate entity named Deathstorm. Deathstorm tells Stein that he intends to create enough emotional instability between Ronnie and Jason that the Firestorm matrix will trigger another Big Bang, thereby destroying the universe. He then absorbs Stein to use his knowledge against Ronnie. An internal argument between Ronnie and Jason ignites the spark, transporting them to the antimatter universe of Qward. When Ronnie and Jason confront him, Deathstorm brings Stein out of the Firestorm matrix to taunt them with. Deathstorm attempts to turn Ronnie and Jason into salt, but Stein takes the brunt of the attack and dies. Jason and Ronnie decide to truly work together to avenge Stein's death. The Life Entity declares that Ronnie has accomplished his mission, creating a burst of white energy that obliterates Deathstorm and returns Ronnie and Jason to Earth.

=== The New 52 ===
After the events of the 2011 Flashpoint storyline, The New 52 reality altered Firestorm's personal history to the point of being completely restarted. Ronnie Raymond is reintroduced as a high school senior and the captain of the football team. During a terrorist attack on their school, his classmate Jason Rusch gives him a vial that he obtained from Martin Stein, which contains the "god particle", one of Stein's creations. The particle transforms both Jason and Ronnie into Firestorm, and the two briefly battle before accidentally merging into a creature known as Fury. Sharing the identity of Firestorm, with Ronnie being the brawn and Jason being the brains, Firestorm is considered for recruitment into the Justice League along with several other heroes.

=== DC Rebirth ===
The DC Rebirth relaunch restores a version of Firestorm's initial origin to continuity. In Doomsday Clock, Doctor Manhattan informs Ronnie that Stein deliberately caused the accident that transformed the two into Firestorm to study metahumans. Ronnie, furious at Stein, begins operating as Firestorm on his own, but is later taken over by the Firestorm matrix, which is revealed to be sentient. It is established that Ronnie's mother died when he was about seven years old and that he worked as an assistant to Martin Stein while attending the University of Pittsburgh.

== Other versions ==
- An alternate universe version of Ronnie Raymond makes a cameo appearance in JLA: The Nail as a captive of Cadmus Labs.
- Quantum-Storm, an alternate universe version of Ronnie Raymond from Earth-37 amalgamated with Captain Atom, appears in Countdown: Arena.
- Firestork, a funny animal incarnation of Firestorm, appears in "Just'a Lotta Animals".
- An alternate universe version of Ronnie Raymond appears in the Flashpoint event.

== In other media ==
=== Television ===
Robbie Amell as Ronnie Raymond/Firestorm with Victor Garber as Martin Stein in the background

- Ronnie Raymond / Firestorm appears in Super Friends: The Legendary Super Powers Show, voiced by Mark L. Taylor. This version is a member of the Justice League who gained his powers from a molecular fusion experiment conducted by Martin Stein that went awry.
- Ronnie Raymond / Firestorm appears in The Super Powers Team: Galactic Guardians, voiced again by Mark L. Taylor. This version is a member of the Justice League.
- Ronnie Raymond / Firestorm was planned to appear in Justice League Unlimited, with writer/producer Dwayne McDuffie stating that the series' creators had permission from DC Comics to use the character, but were unable to come up with a story that they liked. Later on, it was stated that the character was intended to be the focus of "The Greatest Story Never Told", but was replaced with Booster Gold.
- Ronnie Raymond / Firestorm appears in Batman: The Brave and the Bold, voiced by Bill Fagerbakke. This version is a high school science teacher who became Firestorm alongside his student, Jason Rusch, after they were accidentally exposed to supercharged nuclear energy during an explosion caused by Doctor Double X.
- Two incarnations of Ronnie Raymond appear in The Flash, portrayed by Robbie Amell.
  - The Earth-1 version is Caitlin Snow's fiancé and an engineer at S.T.A.R. Labs. In the first season, he was exposed to dark matter energy amidst the explosion of Harrison Wells' particle accelerator, fused with Martin Stein and the F.I.R.E.S.T.O.R.M. matrix, and presumed dead. After Team Flash separate the two, Raymond and Stein master their powers and assist the Flash in fighting crime. Raymond later marries Snow, but sacrifices himself to close a singularity created by the Reverse-Flash. Following this, Raymond appears as hallucinations and in flashbacks depicted in the third and eighth seasons.
  - An Earth-2 doppelgänger of Raymond appears in the second season episode "Welcome to Earth-2" as Deathstorm, Killer Frost's significant other and an enforcer for Zoom.
- Ronnie Raymond / Firestorm appears in Justice League Action, voiced by P. J. Byrne. This version is a member of the Justice League who became Firestorm during an attack on the Hudson plant by bandits seeking plutonium.

=== Film ===
Ronnie Raymond / Firestorm appears in Justice League: Crisis on Infinite Earths.

=== Video games ===
- Ronnie Raymond / Firestorm appears as a character summon in Scribblenauts Unmasked: A DC Comics Adventure.
- Ronnie Raymond / Firestorm appears as a playable character in Lego Batman 3: Beyond Gotham, voiced by Nolan North.

=== Miscellaneous ===
Ronnie Raymond / Firestorm appears in the Justice League Unlimited tie-in comic.
