= List of DC Universe locations =

This page lists significant locations in the DC Universe, the shared universe setting of DC Comics.

== Sites ==
=== Arrowcave ===
The Arrowcave is the former base of operations of the Green Arrow and Speedy.

=== Avernus Cemetery ===
Avernus Cemetery is a hidden burial ground in Central City for deceased members of the Rogues.

=== Big Belly Burger ===
Big Belly Burger is a fast food chain that was founded in the 1950s and later bought by LexCorp. It started out in the fictional location of Coast City, home of Hal Jordan. The restaurant was inspired by Bob's Big Boy.

==== Big Belly Burger in other media ====
- Big Belly Burger appears in media set in the Arrowverse.
- Big Belly Burger appears in Blue Beetle.
- Big Belly Burger can also be found in the cinematic DCU. It can be seen in Peacemaker season 2, and in the background of Superman (2025).
- Big Belly Burger serves as inspiration for a food establishment at the DC Universe area of Six Flags.

=== Burnside ===
Burnside is a borough of Gotham City that is connected to Gotham by the Burnside Bridge. It is home to The New 52 version of Batgirl (Barbara Gordon) and appears in Batman '89 as the birthplace of Drake Winston and Harvey Dent.

=== Casanova Club ===
The Casanova Club is a nightclub owned by Alex Logue in Newcastle, England. It was there that a demon was summoned and John Constantine failed to save a young girl named Astra Logue who was taken to Hell.

=== Crime Alley ===
Crime Alley is the most dangerous area of Gotham City, where Thomas and Martha Wayne were killed by Joe Chill during a mugging. It was previously known as Park Row before gaining its infamous reputation.

=== Flash Museum ===
The Flash Museum is a memorial to the Flash (Barry Allen). It is located in Central City.

=== Hall of Doom ===
The Hall of Doom is the home base of the Legion of Doom.

=== House of Secrets ===
==== Reichuss Mansion ====
The Reichuss Mansion is a mobile haunted house that served as the House of Secrets in the 1990s Vertigo series.

=== Iceberg Lounge ===
The Iceberg Lounge is a nightclub and base of operations for the Penguin. It is located in Gotham City.

==== Iceberg Lounge in other media ====
- The Iceberg Lounge appears in the DC Animated Universe.
- The Iceberg Lounge appears in Gotham.
- The Iceberg Lounge appears in The Lego Batman Movie
- The Iceberg Lounge appears in Batman: Caped Crusader.
- The Iceberg Lounge appears in The Batman and its spin-off The Penguin.
- The Iceberg Lounge appears in Batman: Arkham City.

=== Justice Society Headquarters ===
The current version of the Justice Society Headquarters is built on the foundation of the former brownstone headquarters and museum. The former headquarters in Gotham City, the latter in Manhattan. Sometimes called Dodds Mansion.

==== Justice Society Headquarters in other media ====
The Justice Society Headquarters appears in the Smallville episode "Absolute Justice".

=== LexCorp Towers Complex ===
The LexCorp Towers complex is the former headquarters of Lex Luthor. It is located in Metropolis.

=== Lux ===
Lux is the bar/nightclub based in Los Angeles owned by Lucifer Morningstar and his mistress Mazikeen.

=== Netherworld ===
The Netherworld is a fictional area of the city of Chicago.

=== Oblivion Bar ===
The Oblivion Bar is an extradimensional bar used as a gathering place/hangout for magic users, as well as the headquarters for the Shadowpact.

=== Sanctum of Doctor Fate ===
The Sanctum of Doctor Fate is Doctor Fate's headquarters. It is located in Salem, Massachusetts.

=== Secret Sanctuary ===
The Secret Sanctuary is the original headquarters of the Justice League of America and briefly headquarters of the Doom Patrol. It is located in Happy Harbor, Rhode Island.

=== Sherwood Florist ===
Sherwood Florist is originally in Seattle and now in Star City, the business operated by Black Canary.

=== Suicide Slum ===
Suicide Slum (officially named "Southside") is a particularly impoverished and crime-ridden neighborhood in Metropolis. Post-Crisis, Lex Luthor was born and raised here prior to building his fortune.

=== Titans Tower ===
Titans Tower is the headquarters of the Teen Titans, originally located in New York City and currently located in San Francisco.

==== Titans Tower in other media ====
- The animated series Teen Titans and Teen Titans Go! have the Titans Tower located in the fictional Jump City.
- Titans Tower is featured in Titans.
- Titans Tower is featured in films set in the DC Animated Movie Universe (DCAMU).

=== Underworld ===
The Underworld is a place in Metropolis's sewers which is rejected by society and where the Warworlders took control.

=== Valhalla Cemetery ===
Valhalla Cemetery is a burial ground located in Metropolis for superheroes who have died in the line of duty.

=== Correctional facilities ===
==== Belle Reve ====
Belle Reve is a high security metahuman prison located in St. Roch, Louisiana and the headquarters of the Suicide Squad.

==== Belle Reve in other media ====
- In Smallville, Belle Reve Sanitarium is a prison for "meteor freaks" (metahumans) and the mentally ill located near Kansas.
- Belle Reve Special Security Barracks appears in the DC Extended Universe, as the location where Lex Luthor was sent at the end of Batman v Superman: Dawn of Justice and in Suicide Squad, where it is revealed to be a black site where the Suicide Squad is recruited.
- Belle Reve Correctional Center appears in The Suicide Squad and its spinoff Creature Commandos, where it is the base of operations for Task Force X and later Task Force M.

==== Blackgate Penitentiary ====
Blackgate Penitentiary is a prison in Gotham City that houses non-metahuman criminals, such as Rupert Thorne, Carmine Falcone, the Penguin, Arnold Wesker / Ventriloquist, Arthur Brown / Cluemaster and Victor Zsasz.

==== Blackgate Penitentiary in other media ====
- Blackgate Penitentiary appears in Gotham.
- Blackgate Penitentiary appears in Batwoman.
- Blackgate Penitentiary appears in The Penguin.
- Blackgate Penitentiary appears in The Dark Knight Rises.
- Blackgate Penitentiary appears in the Batman: Arkham series.

==== Gotham State Penitentiary ====
Gotham State Penitentiary is a prison located in the Sommerset neighborhood, near Arkham Asylum.

==== Gotham State Penitentiary in other media ====
- Gotham State Penitentiary appears in Batman (1966).

==== Iron Heights Penitentiary ====
Iron Heights Penitentiary is a high security prison devised for many of the foes of the Flash. It is located near Keystone City.

==== Iron Heights Penitentiary in other media ====
- Iron Heights Penitentiary appears in Batman: The Brave and the Bold.
- Iron Heights Penitentiary appears in The Flash.
- Iron Heights Penitentiary appears in the Scooby-Doo and Guess Who? episode "One Minute Mysteries!".
- Iron Heights Penitentiary appears in Batman: Arkham Knight. This version is a blimp like prison.

==== Peña Duro ====
Peña Duro, also called Hard Rock in English, is the former prison of the villain Bane that is located in Santa Prisca. He served a life sentence there as a child because of the actions committed by his father King Snake.

==== Rock Falls Penitentiary ====
Rock Falls Penitentiary is a prison in Rock Falls, Iowa. It was originally created for the film Shazam! and incorporated into subsequent comics as a prison that had a section built to house the magic-based enemies of the Shazam Family.

==== Ravenscar Secure Facility ====
Ravenscar Secure Facility is a mental asylum in Yorkshire where John Constantine was committed after the Newcastle Incident.

==== Slabside Island ====
Slabside Island, also called the Slab and Slabside Penitentiary, is a high security metahuman prison. Originally in New Jersey, it was later transported to Antarctica after the Joker's "Last Laugh" riot. Shilo Norman was the original warden of Slabside Penitentiary.

==== Slabside Island in other media ====
- A version of Slabside Island called Slabside Maximum Security Prison appears in Arrow.

==== Stryker's Island ====
Stryker's Island is a prominent penitentiary in Metropolis specifically New Troy's West River.

==== Stryker's Island in other media ====
- Stryker's Island appears in the DC Animated Universe.
- Stryker's Island appears in Justice League: Crisis on Two Earths.
- Stryker's Island appears in All-Star Superman.
- Stryker's Island appears in Superman vs. The Elite.
- Stryker's Island appears in Batman v Superman: Dawn of Justice as an abandoned island between Gotham City and Metropolis.
- Stryker's Island appears in Lego DC Super-Villains as a main hub.
- Stryker's Island appears in My Adventures with Superman.
- Stryker's Island is set to appear in The People v. Gorilla Grodd.

=== Industrial sites ===
==== Ace Chemicals ====
Ace Chemicals is a chemical plant in Gotham City where the Joker supposedly originated.

==== Ace Chemicals in other media ====
- Ace Chemicals appears in Batman: The Animated Series and The New Batman Adventures.
- Ace Chemicals appears in The Flash episode "Back to Normal"
- Ace Chemicals appears in Gotham.
- Ace Chemicals appears in Batwoman.
- Ace Chemicals appears in Batman (1989), though it is renamed Axis Chemicals.
- Ace Chemicals appears in the DC Extended Universe.
  - In the film Suicide Squad, flashbacks show Joker convinced Harley Quinn to bathe in the same chemicals as he did.
  - Ace Chemicals appears in Birds of Prey. Following joker and Harley Quinn's break-up, Harley destroys Ace Chemicals.
- Ace Chemicals appears in Lego Batman 2: DC Super Heroes.

==== AmerTek Industries ====
AmerTek Industries is a military arms dealer previously in Washington, D.C. that was run by Colonel Thomas Weston. John Henry Irons worked there until he discovered his inventions were being used for evil purposes.

==== AmerTek Industries in other media ====
- AmerTek Industries appears in Arrow.
- AmerTek Industries appears in the fourth season of Supergirl.
- AmerTek Industries appears in Superman & Lois.
- AmerTek Industries appears in the My Adventures with Superman episode "Fullmetal Scientist". John Henry Irons and Silas Stone used to work at AmerTek Industries until Thomas Weston fired him for speaking against an unstable energy project he plan to make public.
- An AmerTek Industries building appears in Batman: Arkham Origins.
- An AmerTek Industries building appears in Batman: Arkham Knight.
- An AmerTek Industries building appears in Suicide Squad: Kill the Justice League.

==== Daggett Industries ====
Daggett Industries is a pharmaceutical company founded and owned by Roland Daggett. Created for Batman: The Animated Series, Daggett Industries later appeared in the main comics continuity.

==== Ferris Aircraft ====
Ferris Aircraft is Coast City's aerospace company that was originally founded and owned by Carl Ferris and Conrad Bloch and now run by Ferris' daughter Carol Ferris.

==== Ferris Aircraft in other media ====
- Ferris Aircraft appears in Justice League: The New Frontier.
- Ferris Aircraft appears in Green Lantern: First Flight.
- Ferris Aircraft appears in Green Lantern.

==== GothCorp ====
GothCorp is a company based in Gotham City, founded and owned by Ferris Boyle, targeted by ex-employee Victor Fries. Created for Batman: The Animated Series, the company later appeared in The Batman and the Arkhamverse as well as appearing in the mainstream comics.

==== Kord Industries ====
Kord Industries is an industrial firm founded and owned by Ted Kord.

==== Kord Industries in other media ====
- Kord Industries appears in Batman: The Brave and the Bold.
- Kord Industries appears in Blue Beetle.

==== LexCorp ====
LexCorp is an international multi-corporation founded and owned by Lex Luthor. The company is based in Metropolis and is headquartered in LexCorp Tower. In other continuities, it is also known as LuthorCorp or L-Corp.

LexCorp was founded primarily to serve as a front to Luthor's criminal enterprise while simultaneously being a symbol of Luthor's victory over Superman, as Luthor values defeating Superman over financial gain. After acquiring several smaller businesses, LexCorp grows rapidly into a diverse international conglomerate. By the timeframe of the Alliance invasion it was estimated that LexCorp either directly or indirectly employed nearly two-thirds of Metropolis' population of 11 million people, dominating commerce around much of the world. Luthor intends to convert LexCorp into a legitimate operation after his retirement from crime; in the future, LexCorp becomes a successful non-criminal enterprise.

==== LexCorp in other media ====
Television

- LexCorp appears in Superman (1988).
- LexCorp appears in Lois and Clark: The New Adventures of Superman.
- LexCorp appears in the DC Animated Universe (DCAU) series Superman: The Animated Series and Justice League.
- LuthorCorp appears in Smallville. This version of the company is an agricultural conglomerate founded by Lionel Luthor. Following his incarceration in the fourth season, his son Lex takes over and gradually adds several subsidiaries until he disappears, leading to Tess Mercer replacing him until his return.
- LexCorp appears in Krypto the Superdog.
- LexCorp appears in The Batman two-part episode "The Batman/Superman Story".
- LexCorp appears in Young Justice. This version of the company is initially run by Lex Luthor until he is named Secretary-General of the United Nations, leading to his sister Lena Luthor taking over in his place.
- LuthorCorp appears in Supergirl. In the second season, Lena Luthor takes over the company and renames it "L-Corp" following her brother Lex's imprisonment. In the third season, Samantha Arias becomes the company's CFO amidst L-Corp's experiments with synthetic Kryptonite. In the fourth season, the company transitions to researching Black Kryptonite while Lex is released from prison on a medical furlough and uses L-Corp resources to restore his reputation. In the fifth season, due to changes made to the multiverse during the events of "Crisis on Infinite Earths", Lex was never arrested, remained CEO of LuthorCorp, which retained its original name, and bought out the Department of Extranormal Operations (DEO). Additionally, Leviathan operatives infiltrated its board of directors in an attempt to conquer the world. In the sixth season, following Leviathan's defeat, Lex is arrested for committing crimes in association with them, but is acquitted and temporarily gains full control of LuthorCorp from Lena until he unintentionally imprisons himself in the Phantom Zone. Lena subsequently takes back the company and establishes the Lena Luthor Foundation.
- LexCorp appears in the Harley Quinn episode "Bachelorette".
- LexCorp appears in DC Super Hero Girls (2019).
- LuthorCorp appears in Superman & Lois.
- LexCorp appears in My Adventures with Superman. This version of the company was founded by Lex Luthor after annexing AmerTek Industries with assistance from Task Force X and goes on to include Slade Wilson. In the third season, Amanda Waller shuts down this company due to Luthor's evil creations such as Cyborg Superman and the Eradicator.

Film

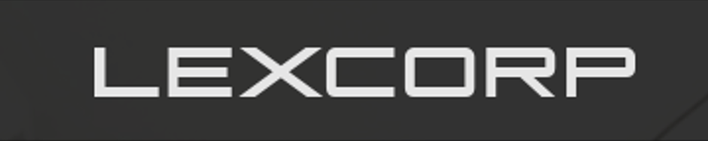
LexCorp logo from the DC Extended Universe.

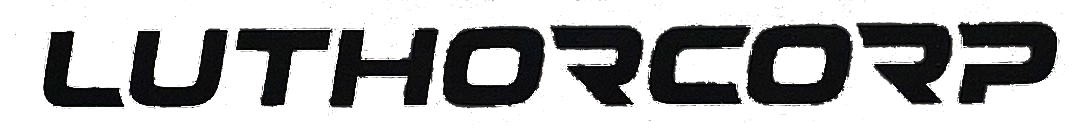
LuthorCorp logo from the DC Universe.

- LexCorp, referred to as "LexCo", appears in Justice League: The New Frontier.
- LexCorp appears in films set in the DC Extended Universe (DCEU):
  - LexCorp first appears in Man of Steel (2013).
  - LexCorp appears in Batman v Superman: Dawn of Justice (2016), in which it is revealed that the company was founded by Alexander Luthor Sr. before his son Alexander "Lex" Luthor Jr. took over. Following the death of Superman and the exposure of Luthor by Lois Lane as the culprit behind numerous crimes against peace and humanity, Luthor is arrested and deposed as CEO of LexCorp.
  - LexCorp appears in Blue Beetle (2023).
- LexCorp appears in The Death of Superman.
- LexCorp appears in DC League of Super-Pets.
- LuthorCorp appears in Superman (2025).

Video games

- LexCorp makes a cameo appearance in Mortal Kombat vs. DC Universe via the Metropolis stage.
- LexCorp appears in DC Universe Online. This version of the company is based in downtown Metropolis and is staffed by shock troopers, heavy troopers, security guards, enforcers, and gladiators.
- LexCorp appears in Lego Batman 2: DC Super Heroes. Additionally, LexBots, "LexCorp Security", and a "LexCorp Heavy" appear as playable characters, with the last two being exclusive to the handheld versions of the game.
- LexCorp appears in Batman: Arkham Knight.
- LexCorp appears in Lego Dimensions.
- LexCorp appears in Lego DC Super-Villains.

==== Maxwell Lord Enterprises ====
Maxwell Lord Enterprises is a multinational company founded, owned and operated by Maxwell Lord. It is the sponsor of the Justice League International.

==== Maxwell Lord Enterprises in other media ====
- Lord Technologies is founded and owned by Maxwell Lord in the Arrowverse.
- In Wonder Woman 1984, Black Gold Cooperative, also known as simply Black Gold, is an oil cooperative founded by Lord and Simon Stagg during the Cold War.
- LordTech appears in media set in the DC Universe. This version sponsors the Justice Gang.
  - LordTech appears in Superman.
  - LordTech appears in the Peacemaker season 2 episode “The Ties That Grind”.

==== Rathaway Industries ====
Rathaway Industries is founded by Osgood Rathaway, father of the Pied Piper.

==== Queen Industries ====
Queen Industries is an international corporation founded and owned by Robert and Moira Queen and later run by their son Oliver Queen.

==== Queen Industries in other media ====
- Queen Industries appears in Arrow.

==== Stagg Enterprises ====
Stagg Enterprises is a research and development firm in genetics research founded by Simon Stagg.

==== Stagg Enterprises in other media ====
===== Television =====
- Stagg Enterprises appears in the Justice League episode "Metamorphosis".
- Stagg Industries appears in Beware the Batman.
- Stagg Industries appears in The Flash.
- Stagg Industries appears in the Young Justice episode "Triptych".

===== Film =====
- Stagg Industries appears in Wonder Woman 1984.
- A Stagg Industries building appears in Superman (2025).

===== Video games =====
- Stagg Industries appears in Batman: Arkham Knight.
- Stagg Industries appears in Gotham Knights.
- Stagg Industries appears in Suicide Squad: Kill the Justice League.

==== Steelworks ====
Steelworks is located in Metropolis. It is founded and owned by John Henry Irons.

==== S.T.A.R. Labs ====
S.T.A.R. Labs, short for Scientific and Technological Advanced Research Laboratories, a place of scientific research on metahuman studies located in various facilities. It "quickly became a mainstay of the pre-Flashpoint DC universe, acting as a prison for metahuman menaces and a medical resource for injured or mysteriously afflicted Super Heroes." S.T.A.R. Labs has also appeared in various other media, including the DC Animated Universe, Smallville, the Arrowverse, the DC Extended Universe, and the DC Animated Movie Universe.

=== Extraterrestrial sites ===
==== Hardcore Station ====
Hardcore Station is a lawless space-city run by corporations.

==== Justice League Satellite ====
Justice League Satellite is the headquarters of the Justice League of America, located in orbit 22,300 miles above the surface of the Earth. It is destroyed during Crisis on Infinite Earths, but rebuilt in Justice League of America Vol. 2 #7 after Infinite Crisis, later destroyed in Forever Evil. A third one was gifted by LexCorp under the title "Watchtower".

==== Justice League Satellite in other media ====
The Satellite appears in Batman: The Brave and the Bold. This version initially was the Justice League's headquarters, before their mysterious disbandment. It was later reopened and became the Justice League International's new headquarters.

==== Justice League Watchtower ====
Justice League Watchtower, originally a White Martian base located on the Moon, is later used as the headquarters of the JLA during the run of JLA equipping with advanced technology from races like the New Gods and Kryptonians.

==== Justice League Watchtower in other media ====
===== Television =====
- The Watchtower appears in Smallville. This version is not a space station. Instead, it serves as a high-tech underground base of operations for Green Arrow and Chloe Sullivan located in a Metropolis loft.
- The Watchtower appears in media set in the DC Animated Universe (DCAU). This version was built by Batman.
- The Watchtower appears in The Batman. This version was commissioned by Martian Manhaunter.
- The Watchtower appears in Young Justice.
- The Watchtower appears in Justice League Action. This version was built on a dormant artificial volcano in the waters around Metropolis.
- The Watchtower appears in media set in the Arrowverse. This version is not a space station, and it is called "The Tower".

===== Film =====
- The Watchtower appears in Justice League: Crisis on Two Earths.
- The Watchtower appears in Justice League: Doom.
- The Watchtower, renamed Tower of Justice, appears in Justice League: Gods and Monsters. This version is stationed in Metropolis.
- The Watchtower appears in films set in the DC Animated Movie Universe (DCAMU).
- The Watchtower appears in Injustice.
- The Watchtower appears in Green Lantern: Beware My Power.

===== Video games =====
- The Watchtower appears in DC Universe Online.
- The Watchtower appears in Lego Batman 2: DC Super Heroes.
- The Watchtower appears in Injustice: Gods Among Us.
- The Watchtower appears in Lego Batman 3: Beyond Gotham.

==== Portworld ====
Portworld is an intergalactic spaceport and home of Green Lanterns Wyxla and Tahr.

==== Starlag ====
Starlag is a prison station used by the Alien Alliance. It first appeared in Invasion! #1 (January 1989).

==== Warworld ====
Warworld is an artificial planet used by Mongul and Brainiac.

==== Warworld in other media ====
- Warworld appears in Justice League.
- Warworld appears in Young Justice.
- Warworld appears in Justice League: Warworld.

=== Schools and universities ===
==== Burnside College ====
Burnside College is the private college that Batgirl (Barbara Gordon) attends in the New 52 continuity.

==== Gotham Academy ====
Gotham Academy, as of DC Rebirth continuity, is a prestigious private boarding school that many of Gotham City's elite have attended. It is also the setting of Gotham Academy.

==== Gotham Academy in other media ====
- Gotham Academy appears in The Batman episode "Attack of the Terrible Trio".
- Gotham Academy appears in Young Justice.

==== Gotham Military Academy ====
Gotham Military Academy is a military academy located in Gotham City. Colonel Sophie Moore, a former classmate and girlfriend of Kate Kane when the two attended West Point, is an instructor there.

==== Gotham University ====
Gotham University, also called Gotham State University, is located in Gotham City. In the Golden Age story "The Man Behind the Red Hood!", Batman and Robin, while teaching a criminology class, discovered that the Joker was the criminal formerly known as the Red Hood. Other staff and students include Jonathan Crane and Stephanie Brown.

==== Holliday College ====
Holliday College is the main university in Gateway City. Wonder Woman met the Beeta Lambda sorority members the Holliday Girls and Etta Candy there.

==== Hudson University ====
Hudson University is a university located in New Carthage, New York. Notable former students and staff include Dick Grayson, Martin Stein, and Duela Dent. It was first mentioned in Batman comics in the late 1940s. Hudson University has also appeared in the Law & Order franchise and other TV series.

==== Ivy University ====
Ivy University is located in Ivy Town. Ray Palmer / Atom used to work in its physics department.

==== Metropolis University ====
Metropolis University is the main university in Metropolis. Clark Kent is an alumnus of MU.

==== Midwestern University ====
Midwestern University, located in Keystone City, this university is the alma mater of Jay Garrick. In some stories, the school is called Western State University.

==== Sanford Military Academy ====
Sanford Military Academy is an international boarding school with a reputation as a "dumping ground" for problem children from wealthy families.

==== Stanhope College ====
Stanhope College is a college located outside Metropolis. Linda Lee, the Silver Age Supergirl, was a former student. Post-Crisis, the school, now located in Leesburg, Virginia, is renamed Stanhope University; Linda Danvers is enrolled here.

==== Université Notre Dame des Ombres ====
Université Notre Dame des Ombres (Our Lady of the Shadows University) is a college in France for the training of spies and super-enhanced humans. The headmistress is the former Phantom Lady Sandra Knight. Graduates include the future Phantom Lady Dee Tyler, and Vivian and Constance D'Aramis.

=== Sites that exist exclusively in other DC media ===
==== Stonegate Prison ====
Stonegate Prison is a prison that is analogous to Blackgate Prison in Batman: The Animated Series and the greater DC Animated Universe.

== Cities of the DC Universe Earth ==
=== Fictional cities ===
==== Amnesty Bay ====
Amnesty Bay is the surface-home of Aquaman and his father Thomas Curry. It is located in Maine, but relocated in Massachusetts during The New 52.

==== Baralsville ====
Baralsville is a small mining town that is visited by Clark Kent. It is located in northern Pennsylvania.

==== Blüdhaven ====
Blüdhaven is the former home of Dick Grayson (Nightwing) of the Post-Zero Hour continuity that was destroyed by the Secret Society of Super Villains during Infinite Crisis. In the New 52 universe, during the DC Rebirth event, the Dick Grayson of that continuity later settled in his reality's version after the pre-Flashpoint Superman told him the story about his alternate universe counterpart. Blüdhaven is located near Gotham City in southern New Jersey.

==== Blue Valley ====
Blue Valley is the birthplace of the third Flash (Wally West) and home of Stargirl. It is located in Nebraska.

==== Blue Valley in other media ====
- Blue Valley was the main setting of Stargirl.

==== Calvin City ====
Calvin City is the home of the Golden Age Atom. It is located in Pennsylvania.

==== Central City ====
Central City is the former home of the second Flash (Barry Allen). It has been variously stated to be in Ohio, Illinois, Missouri, and Florida.

==== Central City in other media ====
- Central City appears in The Flash.
- Central City appears in Justice League.
- Central City appears in Justice League Unlimited.
- Central City appears in The Flash. Central City appears in Stuart Fails To Save The Universe

==== Charlton's Point ====
Charlton's Point is the home of Miguel Devante and the Son of Vulcan.

==== Civic City ====
Civic City is the former home of the Justice Society of America. It is located in Pennsylvania.

==== Civic City in other media ====
- Civic City was featured in Stargirl. The Justice Society has a headquarters and museum there.

==== Coast City ====
Coast City is the home of Green Lantern Hal Jordan, located in California. The city is destroyed by Mongul and Cyborg Superman during the "Reign of the Supermen" storyline. Mongul and Cyborg Superman build Engine City in Coast City's ashes, as part of a plot to transform Earth into a second Warworld. Coast City was later restored by the Spectre and Hal Jordan.

==== Coast City in other media ====
- Coast City gets mentioned in the Arrowverse and DC Extended Universe.
- Coast City appears in Clayface.

==== Codsville ====
Codsville is a small fishing village in Maine for which the original Doom Patrol gave their lives. Codsville was then renamed "Four Heroes City" in their honor.

==== Codsville in other media ====
- Codsville appears in the Batman: The Brave and the Bold episode "The Last Patrol!".
- Codsville appears in Teen Titans Go!.

==== Cosmos ====
Cosmos is the hometown of the Teen Titan Risk. It is located in Colorado.

==== Crucible ====
Crucible is a city briefly visited by the Resurrection Man. It is located in Georgia, on Interstate 285.

==== Dakota City ====
Dakota City is the home of Icon, Static, the Shadow Cabinet and the Blood Syndicate.

==== Dakota City in other media ====
- Dakota City is the main setting of Static Shock.
- Dakota City appears in Young Justice.

==== Delta City ====
Delta City is the home of the Heckler and Vext. It is established in Vext #1 that it exists within regular DCU continuity.

==== Dos Rios ====
Dos Rios is the home of the second El Diablo. It is located in Texas.

==== Elmond ====
Elmond is the home of Hawk and Dove. It is located in Virginia.

==== Empire City ====
Empire City is the home of the second Manhunter, Paul Kirk. It is located somewhere in the East Coast of the United States.

==== Evergreen ====
Evergreen is home to Robert Connors/Comet. It is located in Washington.

==== Evergreen in other media ====
- Evergreen appears in Peacemaker.

==== Evergreen City ====
Evergreen City is the former home of Green Lantern Hal Jordan. It is located in Washington. Hal Jordan was an insurance salesman for the Evergreen Insurance Company for a brief period.

==== Fairfax ====
Fairfax is a New England town that is home to Chris King and Vicki Grant.

==== Fairfield ====
Fairfield is the former home of Billy Batson (Captain Marvel), Mary Batson (Mary Marvel), and their adopted parents. It is later destroyed by Mister Atom.

==== Fawcett City ====
Fawcett City is the home of Captain Marvel, the Marvel Family, Bulletman and Bulletgirl, Ibis the Invincible, and several other characters formerly associated with Fawcett Comics.

==== Fawcett City in other media ====
- Fawcett City appears in the The Kid Super Power Hour with Shazam! episode "Who's Who at the Zoo".
- Fawcett City appears in the Justice League Unlimited episode "Clash".
- Fawcett City appears in Batman: The Brave and the Bold.
- Fawcett City appears in Young Justice.

==== Feithera ====
Feithera is a hidden city of bird-people. The home of Northwind. It is located in Greenland (destroyed).

==== Freeland ====
Freeland is a neighborhood in the city of Metropolis.

==== Freeland in other media ====
- In Black Lightning, Freeland is reimagined as a large city in Georgia.

==== Gateway City ====
Gateway City is the former home of Wonder Woman, the first Mister Terrific, and the Spectre. It is located in California.

==== Gorilla City ====
Gorilla City is a hidden city populated by intelligent primates, including Detective Chimp, Solovar, Gorilla Grodd, Monsieur Mallah, and Giganta. It is located in Equatorial Africa.

==== Gorilla City in other media ====
- Gorilla City appears in the Challenge of the Super Friends episode "Revenge on Gorilla City".
- Gorilla City appears in Justice League.
- Gorilla City appears in Justice League Unlimited.
- Gorilla City appears in The Flash, particularly in the two-part story arc "Gorilla City" (2017).

==== Happy Harbor ====
Happy Harbor is the location of the Secret Sanctuary of the JLA, and former home of Snapper Carr and the Red Tornado. It is located in Rhode Island.

==== Hatton Corners ====
Hatton Corners is a small town saved from Mister Twister by the Teen Titans in their first appearance.

==== Hidden City ====
The Hidden City is the home of the magically gifted Homo Magi, including Zatara and Zatanna. It is located in Turkey.

==== Hope Springs ====
Hope Springs is a small mining town which was once part of the Mosaic World. It is located in West Virginia.

==== Hub City ====
Hub City is the home of the Question and the Dan Garrett version of Blue Beetle.

==== Hub City in other media ====
- Hub City appears in Creature Commandos.

==== Ivy Town ====
Ivy Town is the home of the second and current Atom. It is located in Massachusetts.

==== Ivy Town in other media ====
- Ivy Town appears in the Arrowverse series Arrow, Legends of Tomorrow and The Flash.

==== Keystone City ====
Keystone City is the home of both the first and third Flashes: Jay Garrick and Wally West, as well as Jakeem Thunder. In the earlier comics, Keystone City is located on Earth-Two. In post-Crisis continuity, Keystone City is located in Kansas across a river from Central City.

==== Keystone City in other media ====
- Keystone City appears in The Flash.

==== Liberty Hill ====
Liberty Hill is the hometown of the third Tattooed Man. It is located in the Washington metropolitan area.

==== Littleville ====
Littleville is the home of Robby Reed. It is located in Colorado.

==== Manchester ====
Manchester is the adopted hometown of Bart Allen/Kid Flash. It is located in Alabama.

==== Mapleton ====
Mapleville is a small town Superman visited in Action Comics #179.

==== Middleton ====
Middleton is the former home of the Martian Manhunter. It is located in Colorado, north of Denver.

==== Midway City ====
Midway City is the former home of Hawkman and Hawkwoman and the Doom Patrol. It is located in Michigan, previously in Illinois.

==== Midway City in other media ====
- Midway City appears in The Flash episode "License to Elongate".
- Midway City is the primary setting of the 2016 film Suicide Squad.
- Midway City appears in the Lanterns episode "Bad Optics".

==== Midwest City ====
Midwest City is the former home of Captain Comet in pre-Crisis continuity.

==== Midvale ====
Midvale is the home of the pre-Crisis Supergirl.

==== Monument Point ====
Monument Point is the home to the Justice Society of America as they try to rebuild the city after they failed to save it from destruction.

==== National City ====
National City is the home of Supergirl, located in southern California. It was originally created for her eponymous TV series, but was later adapted into the comics, and then used as Supergirl's home starting from DC Rebirth.

==== New Carthage ====
New Carthage is the location of Hudson University where Dick Grayson (among others) attended college. It is located in New York.

==== New Venice ====
New Venice is a partially submerged city used as Aquaman's base of operations for a time. It is located in Florida.

==== Opal City ====
Opal City is the home of Starman.

==== Park City ====
Park City is the former home of the second Black Canary on Earth-Two.

==== Pittsdale ====
Pittsdale is the hometown of Lois Lane, her friends and her family.

==== Pittsdale in other media ====
- Pittsdale appears in Superman.

==== Platinum Flats ====
Platinum Flats is the home of the Birds of Prey beginning in 2008. It is located in California.

==== Port Oswego ====
Port Oswego is the home of Naomi, located in Oregon.

==== Portsmouth ====
Portsmouth is the home of the second Doctor Mid-Nite. It is located in Washington.

==== Radiance ====
Radiance is the home of the 1940s hero Little Boy Blue. It is located in Pennsylvania.

==== River City ====
River City is the home of the Odd Man.

==== Santa Marta ====
Santa Marta is a city that served the Flash briefly as a base of operations. It was all but destroyed by Major Disaster. It is located in California.

==== Science City ====
Science City is the home of the Titan Red Star. It is located in Russia.

==== Solar City ====
Solar City is the home of Bruce Gordon/Eclipso. It is located in Florida.

==== St. Roch ====
St. Roch was a city where Hawkman and Hawkgirl lived.

==== St. Roch in other media ====
- St. Roch appears in Peacemaker.

==== Star City ====
Star City is the home of the Green Arrow. Its location has varied over the years; however, the DC Rebirth Green Arrow series specifically states it was originally Seattle, only later being renamed Star City.

==== Star City in other media ====
- In the Arrowverse, it was originally named Starling City before it was rebranded as Star City by Ray Palmer.
- Star City appears in Creature Commandos.

==== Sub Diego ====
Sub Diego is a submerged part of San Diego located off the coast of California. It is the home of Aquagirl and served as a base of operations for Aquaman for a time. Some of its residents were subjected to an underwater-breathing serum created by the scientist Anton Geist. The city is run by Mayor Cal Durham.

==== Superbia ====
Superbia is the home base of the Ultramarine Corps. Originally based in the radioactive remains of Montevideo, it is later smashed into Kinshasa.

==== Tinisha ====
Tinasha is located in the Democratic Republic of the Congo. It is the base of operations for David Zavimbe, the first Batwing.

==== Vanity ====
Vanity is the home of Aztek. It is located in Oregon.

==== Viceroy ====
Viceroy is the home of the Resurrection Man. It is located in South Carolina.

==== Violet Valley ====
Violet Valley is the home of the Rachel Pollack version of the Doom Patrol.

==== Zenith City ====
Zenith City is a city located near Robby Reed's home in Littleville.

=== Actual cities that also exist on the DC Universe Earth ===
- Baltimore: The hometown of Guy Gardner.
- Boston, Massachusetts: The former home base of Wonder Woman and the occasional residence of Aquaman and his wife, Mera.
- Buenos Aires, Argentina: The Home Base of El Gaucho, crime fighter of Argentina and member of Batman Incorporated
- Chicago: The base of operations of Supergirl, Hawkman and Hawkwoman, Ted Kord, Nightwing, Duela Dent, and Batman.
- Dallas, Texas: The hometown of the third Air Wave.
- Dayton: The hometown of Black Alice.
- Denver: The former home base of the Martian Manhunter.
- Detroit: The hometown of Cyborg, John Stewart, Simon Baz, Lady Shiva, and the former home base of Justice League Detroit, Firestorm (Jason Rusch), and Vixen.
- El Paso: The hometown of Jaime Reyes, the third Blue Beetle.
- Gary, Indiana: The hometown of Erik Storn, the third Fury.
- Hoboken, NJ: The hometown of Carlo Sirianni and Matches Malone.
- Honolulu, Hawaii: The home base of Superboy in his 1990s series.
- Houma, Louisiana: The home of the Swamp Thing.
- Kansas City, Missouri: The home to the Doom Patrol during the Kupperberg/Morrison run.
- London, England: The current home base of Wonder Woman and the occasional residence of John Constantine.
- Los Angeles: The hometown of Kyle Rayner and the former home base of the heroine Manhunter (Kate Spencer), the Outsiders and Blue Devil.
- Metropolis, Illinois: It celebrates Superman the fictional character and exists in the DC Universe as celebrating the real Superman.
- Milwaukee, Wisconsin: The hometown of Obsidian.
- New York City: The home base to many superheroes over the years, including the current incarnation of the Teen Titans. Nicknamed "the Cinderella City" in the DC Universe. Its Earth-S counterpart is where Hunchback operates.
- Philadelphia: The hometown of the second Ray and the original Black Condor.
- Phoenix, Arizona: The hometown of Starman (Will Payton).
- Pittsburgh: The hometown for several years of the original Firestorm (Ronnie Raymond).
- Portland, Oregon: Hometown of Jessica Cruz
- Rushville, Nebraska: Location of a Manhunter in the Lanterns TV show.
- San Diego: Half of this city was submerged under the ocean due to an earthquake, becoming Sub Diego. The outlying suburbs are the home of Animal Man.
- San Francisco: The former home base of the Teen Titans, Superboy, Supergirl, the Secret Society of Super Villains, the Power Company, and Zatanna. The Young Justice were briefly based here as well.
- Seattle: The current home base of the Green Arrow and his company, Q-Core and the former home city of the Black Canary, where she owned and operated Sherwood Florist, a flower shop.
- St. Louis: The hometown of Skyrocket.
- St. Roch: The New Orleans neighborhood where the Modern Age Hawkman and Hawkgirl live.
- Topeka, Kansas: It was destroyed by an explosion during an alien invasion, but was later restored.
- Tokyo, Japan: The home base for the Super Young Team and Big Science Action.
- Washington, D.C.: The current home base of Steel, the Alpha Centurion and the Freedom Fighters.
- Waverly, Pennsylvania: The home base of the Hellenders.
- West Point, New York: The location of the United States Military Academy, where Kate Kane, Sophie Moore, and later Bette Kane were enrolled as cadets.

=== Cities that exist exclusively in other DC media ===
==== Capitol City ====
Capitol City is a major city near Shusterville, and the location of the office of the Bureau for Extra-Normal Matters, where Clark Kent and Lana Lang are interns. It is located in Florida. (Superboy)

==== Dairyland ====
Dairyland is a lush farmland located in the Heartland. (Super Friends: Season 1, Episode 7)

==== Jump City ====
Jump City is the hometown of the Teen Titans and most of their enemies in the animated series Teen Titans and Teen Titans Go!. It is located on the West Coast.

==== Steel City ====
Steel City is the hometown of Titans East in the Teen Titans series. It is located on the East Coast.

==== Seaboard City ====
Seaboard City is an alternate-universe city appearing in the Justice League episode "Legends" that is home to the Justice Guild of America and Injustice Guild of America. Their exploits are viewed as fiction by the inhabitants of the main universe, who were inspired to create comics based on them.

==== Shusterville ====
Shusterville is a small college town in Florida where Clark Kent and T.J. White attend the Siegel School of Journalism. The two locations are named for Superman's creators, Joe Shuster and Jerry Siegel. (Superboy)

==== Tempest Key ====
Tempest Key is the home of Arthur Curry in the unaired CW pilot Aquaman. It is located near the Bermuda Triangle, presumably in Florida.

== Fictional geographic locations and countries of the DC Universe Earth ==
=== Abyysia ===
Abyssia is an underground nation once infested by vampires that was saved by the Outsiders.

=== Badhnisia ===
Badhnisia is a small South Seas island nation, in or near present-day Indonesia, where Johnny Thunder was raised.

=== Bana-Mighdall ===
Bana-Mighdall is a fictional Amazon nation located in the Middle East. It is the birthplace of Artemis.

=== Bialya ===
Bialya is a fictional Middle Eastern country and former refuge of supervillains, once ruled by Queen Bee. It is decimated by Black Adam during 52.

==== Bialya in other media ====
- Bialya appears in Young Justice.
- Bialya appears in Batman: The Brave and the Bold.

=== Bhutran ===
Bhutran is a fictional isolated land in southern Asia surrounded by mountains. First appeared in Superman (vol. 2) #97 (February 1995).

=== Blackhawk Island ===
Blackhawk Island is the former home base of the Blackhawks.

=== Boravia ===
Boravia is a European country that faced a civil war. First appeared in Superman #2 (September 1939).

==== Boravia in other media ====
- Boravia appears in the DC Universe film Superman (2025).

=== Bulgravia ===
Bulgravia is a fictional Balkan country.

=== Corto Maltese ===
Corto Maltese is a war-torn island featured in The Dark Knight Returns, set in an alternate continuity. It is named after the comic series of the same name.

Corto Maltese later appeared in the mainstream comics.

==== Corto Maltese in other media ====
- Corto Maltese appears in Batman (1989).
- Corto Maltese appears in Smallville.
- Corto Maltese appears in the TV series set in the Arrowverse:
  - Corto Maltese appears in Arrow.
  - Corto Maltese appears in Supergirl.
- Corto Maltese appears in The Suicide Squad. This version is ruled by an anti-American military dictatorship after they overthrew the US-backed Herrera family regime. Sol Soria later takes control of Corto Maltese and restores its democracy.

=== Dinosaur Island ===
Dinosaur Island is an uncharted Pacific island inhabited by dinosaurs that survived their species' extinction. It was discovered by Enemy Ace in 1927 when he flew Bat Lash, Biff Bradley, General Joseph Stilwell, and "Chop-Chop" (presumably the father of the Blackhawks member) to the island on a mission for Chiang Kai-shek. The island had long been a legend to the Chinese people (known as Dragon Island at the time) and was believed to hold the mystical Swords of Fan. During this mission, the adventurers encounter Vandal Savage and Miss Fear, in addition to the dangerous dinosaurs. This tale appeared in the Guns of the Dragon mini-series.

During World War II, several United States submarines seemingly disappear after encountering an area of seismic disturbances. Marines land on a nearby island hoping to find survivors, but instead, find that the earthquakes has awakened the remote island's resident dinosaur population, who had been preserved in suspended animation for centuries. With their weapons essentially useless, the squad of Marines barely escape.

Despite the presence of dinosaurs, the U.S. government consider the island a valuable strategic location in its war against Japan. Several expeditions and operations take place at the island. The island is also used as a proving ground for the automated soldiers designated G.I. Robot, which prove to be no match for the dinosaurs. The Creature Commandos, the Flying Boots, and the original Suicide Squad all take part in missions on the island during World War II.

It is theorized that the island exists in a state of temporal flux. Black Canary lands on the island in modern times, only to find it still inhabited by Japanese soldiers who are keeping Gunner and Sarge of the Losers in a P.O.W. camp.

==== Dinosaur Island in other media ====
- Dinosaur Island appears in Batman: The Brave and the Bold. This version is located in the Caribbean.
- A variation of Dinosaur Island appears in the Justice League Action episode "Booster's Gold". This version is an island located in the Bermuda Triangle that Booster Gold built a theme park on and brought dinosaurs to via time travel. However, Green Arrow inspires Booster Gold to erase the park from existence by stopping his past self from ever creating the island.
- The Centre, a character inspired by Dinosaur Island, appears in Justice League: The New Frontier, voiced by Keith David. It is a monstrous creature born from the Earth that has the appearance of a floating island, possesses psychic abilities, and can transform its body to extrude tentacles and spawn dinosaur minions. Having observed the evolution of Earth, it came to view humanity as a threat and settled in the Pacific, gaining a reputation as an omnipresent spirit with no beginning or end. The Justice League work together to trap the Centre and hurl it into space, where its body implodes.
- Dinosaur Island appears in DC Showcase: The Losers.
- Dinosaur Island appears in Lego DC Super-Villains.

=== Galonia ===
Galonia is one of several minor European nations controlled by the Earth-Two Lex Luthor.

=== Gotham Bay ===
Gotham Bay is a river which runs through Gotham City.

=== Hasaragua ===
Hasaragua is a fictional South American country and the home of Brutale.

=== Jarhanpur ===
Jarhanpur is an ancient land ruled by Rama Khan, described by its inhabitants as a "living land". First appeared in JLA #62 (March 2002).

==== Jarhanpur in other media ====
- Jarhanpur appears in season 5 of Supergirl. This version is a planet orbiting the Rao system alongside Krypton and Daxam.
- Jarhanpur appears in Superman (2025). This version is located in Eastern Europe and is the neighboring country of Boravia.

=== Kahndaq ===
Kahndaq is a fictional Middle Eastern country, home of Black Adam. It is generally depicted as occupying part of the Sinai Peninsula, the Asian portion of Egypt.

==== Kahndaq in other media ====
Kahndaq appears in Black Adam. In the past, it was oppressed by King Ahk-Ton before he and his followers were slain by Black Adam. In the present, Kahndaq was taken over by a branch of Intergang led by Ahk-Ton's descendant Ishmael Gregor, who is seeking the Crown of Sabbac. The Intergang branch is later decimated by Adam, who kills Gregor.

=== Kasnia ===
Kasnia is a fictional war-torn Balkan country, sometimes spelled Kaznia. It was created for the DC Animated Universe and also appears in Justice League Action, the Arrowverse, DC Universe Online, and Deathstroke: Knights & Dragons.

=== Kor ===
Kor is the fictional African kingdom of Doctor Mist.

=== Markovia ===
Markovia is the home of Terra (Tara Markov) and Geo-Force (Brion Markov). Originally ruled by Tara and Brion's father, King Viktor Markov, Brion assumes leadership of Markovia after Viktor is killed.

==== Markovia in other media ====
- Markovia appears in Arrow.
- Markovia appears in Black Lightning.
- Markovia appears in Young Justice.

=== Molinia ===
Molinia is a fictional Latin American country. First appears in "A Job for Superhombre," Superman #53 (August 1948).

=== Modora ===
Modora is the home of Sonar.

=== Pokolistan ===
Pokolistan is a nation which occupies the site of the former Modora. It was previously ruled by General Zod.

==== Pokolistan in other media ====
- Pokolistan appears in Superman vs. The Elite.
- Pokolistan appears in Creature Commandos.

=== Nairomi ===
Nairomi is an African country originally referenced in Batman #79.

==== Nairomi in other media ====
- Nairomi appears in Batman v Superman: Dawn of Justice.

=== Nyasir ===
Nyasir is an Eastern-African country with a strong 'Redemption' religious movement.

=== Oolong Island ===
Oolong Island is the home base of Chang Tzu and occasionally the Doom Patrol.

=== Qurac ===
Qurac is a Middle Eastern country located on the west side of the Persian Gulf on the Arabian Peninsula. Qurac operates a terrorist/mercenary strikeforce dubbed Onslaught (formerly known as Jihad), a frequent opponent of the Suicide Squad. Cheshire later devastates Qurac with a nuclear bomb, killing most of its population.

==== Qurac in other media ====
- Qurac appears in Young Justice.

=== Rhapastan ===
Rhapastan is a Middle Eastern country said to border Turkey. Plastic Man and Aquaman attempt to broker a ceasefire in Rhapastan during the "Tower of Babel" storyline.

=== Rheelasia ===
Rheelasia is a fictional Asian country. First appeared in Birds of Prey #1 (January 1999).

=== San Monté ===
San Monté is a fictional Latin American country. It first appeared in "War in San Monté," Action Comics #2 (July 1938).

=== San Sebor ===
San Sebor is a country that was overthrown by the corporate-sponsored Conglomerate.

=== Santa Prisca ===
Santa Prisca is a Caribbean island, homeland of Bane.

=== Slaughter Swamp ===
Slaughter Swamp is a paranormal wetland region found on the outskirts of Gotham City and birthplace of Solomon Grundy.

==== Slaughter Swamp in other media ====
- Slaughter Swamp appears in Challenge of the Superfriends. It is the site of the Legion of Doom's headquarters.
- Slaughter Swamp appears in The Batman episode "Grundy's Night".
- Slaughter Swamp appears in Gotham.
- Slaughter Swamp appears as a stage in Injustice 2.

=== Superbia ===
Superbia is a mobile city-state which initially floated above the radioactive ruins of Montevideo, Uruguay.

=== Starfish Island ===
Starfish Island is the island where billionaire Oliver Queen was stranded before becoming the Green Arrow.

==== Starfish Island in other media ====
- Starfish Island appears in The Batman episode "Vertigo".
- In the Arrowverse, it is known as Lian Yu and located in the North China Sea.

=== Syraq ===
Syraq is a fictional Middle Eastern country.

=== Toran ===
Toran is one of several minor European nations on Earth-Two controlled by Alexei Luthor.

=== Tropidor ===
Tropidor is a Central American country.

=== Tundi ===
Tundi is a West African country. After David Zavimbe defeats its ruler Lord Battle, the United Nations seizes control of Tundi to steer it toward democracy.

=== Umec ===
Umec is a Middle Eastern country. Its name is an acronym created by Greg Rucka and stands for "unnamed Middle Eastern country".

=== Vlatava ===
Vlatava is an eastern European country and the homeland of Count Vertigo. The Spectre later devastates Vlatava out of a belief that its inhabitants are doomed to die from wars or poverty, killing all of Vlatava's citizens except for its president and Vertigo.

==== Vlatava in other media ====
- Vlatava appears in DC Showcase: Green Arrow.
- Vlatava appears in Young Justice.

=== Yurgovia ===
Yurgovia is a country ruled by an assassin named Destine. Destine was eventually killed by a superhero named Grifter, leaving the subsequent fate of Yurgovia's government unknown.

=== Zandia ===
Zandia is the homeland of Brother Blood.

=== Zambesi ===
Zambesi is the home country of Vixen, located in Africa.

== Planetary systems ==
=== -7Pi ===
-7Pi is the homeworld in Green Lantern Sector.

=== 1417.196.E ===
1417.196.E is a planet destroyed by Star 196.

=== Almerac ===
Almerac is the former homeworld of Maxima, Ultraa, and Mongal.

=== Angor ===
Angor is the homeworld of the Champions of Angor, or the Justifiers. It was destroyed.

=== Apiaton ===
Apiaton is the homeworld of the Insectoids.

=== Appellax ===
Appellax is the homeworld of the Appellaxians, the first foes of the Justice League.

=== Aoran ===
Aoran is the homeworld of Evil Star, with the entire population killed.

=== Archos ===
Archos is a primitive planet.

=== Arden ===
Arden is an agricultural community of Green Lantern Monak.

=== Astonia ===
Astonia is the homeworld of Saint Walker.

=== Avalon ===
Avalon is the homeworld of DC Comics' King Arthur.

=== Barenton ===
Barenton is an artificial planet constructed to contain Superman. He was unable to escape until the Justice League came to rescue him.

==== Barenton in other media ====
- Barenton appears in Supergirl.

=== Bellatrix ===
Bellatrix is the homeworld of Green Lantern Boodikka.

=== Beltair IV ===
Beltair IV is the homeworld of the Aquoids.

=== Biot ===
Biot is the Manhunter manufacturing facility and planet.

=== Bolovax Vik ===
Bolovax Vik is the homeworld of Kilowog, located near the constellation Ursa Major.

=== Bryak ===
Bryak is a planet ruled by Brainiac.

=== Calaton ===
Calaton is a homeworld monarchy ravaged 250,000 years ago by Doomsday.

=== Cairn ===
Cairn is a planet formerly controlled by a family of intergalactic drug dealers. It was later freed by, and made the headquarters of, L.E.G.I.O.N.

=== Colu ===
Colu is the homeworld of Brainiac and the Coluans, including Vril Dox and Brainiac 5.

==== Colu in other media ====
- Colu appears in Legion of Super Heroes.
- Colu appears in Krypton.
- Colu appears in Harley Quinn.

=== Criq ===
Criq is the homeworld of Green Lantern Driq.

=== Cygnus 4019 ===
Cygnus 4019 (also nicknamed Salvation) is a planet somewhere in the Cygnus system.

During the "Salvation Run" storyline, many villains are exiled to Cygnus 4019 by Amanda Waller and Checkmate. Unbeknownst to Checkmate, Cygnus 4019 is utilized by DeSaad to train Parademons, which among other factors makes it dangerous for the villains to reside on.

==== Cygnus 4019 in other media ====
A variant of Cygnus 4019 appears in the Peacemaker episode "Full Nelson". This version is a dimension that was chosen to serve as a metahuman prison.

=== Czarnia ===
Czarnia is the homeworld of Lobo, who killed its population with a scorpion-like creature he created.

=== Daffath System ===
The Daffath System is the star system of Sinestro Corps member Bedovian.

=== Daxam ===
Daxam is a planet colonized by Kryptonians, who developed a weakness to lead rather than Kryptonite due to the Eradicator manipulating their genetics. Notable Daxamites include Mon-El, Andromeda, Sodam Yat, Ol-Vir, and Dev-Em.

==== Daxam in other media ====
- Daxam appears in Supergirl.
- Daxam appears in Man of Steel.
- Daxam appears in Young Justice.

=== Debstam IV ===
Debstam IV is a planet conquered by Mongul.

=== Dhor ===
Dhor is the homeworld of Kanjar Ro.

=== Exxor ===
Exxor is the homeworld of Zan and Jayna, the Wonder Twins.

=== F'py ===
F'py is the homeworld of Green Lantern Gk'd, of Sector 1337.

=== G'newt ===
G'newt is the homeworld of Green Lantern G'nort.

=== Gallo ===
Gallo is a small satellite at the edge of the galaxy near Oa. It is the homeworld of the mysterious Tribune.

=== Gaolus ===
Gaolus is a maximum security prison planet.

=== Galtea ===
Galtea is the homeworld of Sarkus the Infinite.

=== Garon ===
Garon is the homeworld of the Headmen.

=== Glazzon ===
Glazzon is the homeworld of Green Lantern Ahtier.

=== Graxos IV ===
Graxos IV is the homeworld of Green Lantern Arisia Rrab in the Gemini constellation.

=== Graxos V ===
Graxos V is a planet with a harsh judicial system and the homeworld of Green Lantern Blish Rrab.

=== Grenda ===
Grenda is the homeworld of Green Lanterns Stel and Yron.

=== H'lven ===
H'lven is the homeworld of Green Lanterns Ch'p and B'Dg.

=== Harmony ===
Harmony is the homeworld of Goldstar.

=== Hwagaagaa ===
Hwagaagaa is a planet seized by Tebans.

=== Ith'kaa ===
Ith'kaa is the base of operations for Captain Comet and the location of Comet City.

=== Inner Tasnia ===
Inner Tasnia is the homeworld of Green Lantern Flodo Span.

=== J586 ===
J586 is the homeworld of Green Lantern Medphyll.

=== Kalanor ===
Kalanor is the homeworld of Despero.

==== Kalanor in other media ====
- Kalanor appears in the Justice League episode "Hearts and Minds".

=== Korugar ===
Korugar is the homeworld of Sinestro, Katma Tui, and Soranik Natu of the Green Lantern Corps.

=== Khondra ===
Khondra is the location of the secret military laboratory that created the Sinestro Corps member Despotellis.

=== Khundia ===
Khundia is the homeworld of the Khunds; speculated to be near the Great Bear constellation.

=== Kreno ===
Kreno is a planet where cyborgs are engineered. It is the homeworld of the cyborg mercenary B'aad.

=== Krolotea ===
Krolotea is the homeworld of the Kroloteans.

=== M'brai ===
M'brai is a planet with a unique evolutionary system.

=== Maag ===
Maag is the homeworld of the Green Lantern Volk of Maag.

=== Maltus ===
Maltus is the original homeworld of the Guardians of the Universe, the Zamarons, the Psions, and the Controllers.

=== Muscaria ===
Muscaria is a planet primarily inhabited by sentient fungi and the homeworld of Green Lantern Amanita.

=== Myrg ===
Myrg is a planet ruled by Princess Ramia and her human consort Doiby Dickles.

=== Naftali ===
Naftali is a planet that the Martian Manhunter visited to meet an ancient holy man named K'rkzar. It is located in the galaxy MACS0647-JD.

=== Oa ===
Oa is the homeworld of the Guardians of the Universe and the headquarters of the Green Lantern Corps. It is speculated to be near the center of the Milky Way Galaxy. It is primarily a desert-like, lifeless planet except for the Guardians' city which contains the central power battery and various buildings.

==== Oa in other media ====
===== Television =====
- Oa appears in The Superman/Aquaman Hour of Adventure episode "Evil Is as Evil Does".
- Oa appears in series set in the DC Animated Universe (DCAU).
  - Oa first appears in the Superman: The Animated Series episode "In Brightest Day...".
  - Oa appears in the Justice League episode "In Blackest Night".
  - Oa appears in the Justice League Unlimited episode "The Return".
- Oa appears in the Duck Dodgers episode "The Green Loontern".
- Oa appears in The Batman episode "Ring Toss" through flashbacks.
- Oa appears in Batman: The Brave and the Bold.
- Oa appears in Green Lantern: The Animated Series.
- Oa appears in the DC Super Hero Girls episode "#TheGreenRoom".
- Oa appears in Young Justice.

===== Film =====
- Oa appears in Green Lantern: First Flight.
- Oa appears in Green Lantern: Emerald Knights.
- Oa appears in Green Lantern.
- Oa appears in Justice League vs. the Fatal Five.
- Oa appears in Justice League Dark: Apokolips War.
- Oa appears in Green Lantern: Beware My Power.

===== Video games =====
- Oa appears in DC Universe Online.
- Oa appears in Green Lantern: Rise of the Manhunters.
- Oa appears in Injustice: Gods Among Us.
- Oa appears in Scribblenauts Unmasked: A DC Comics Adventure.
- Oa appears in Lego Batman 3: Beyond Gotham.
- Oa appears in Injustice 2.
- Oa appears in Lego DC Super-Villains.

===== Miscellaneous =====
- Oa appears in the Injustice: Gods Among Us prequel comic.

=== Odym ===
Odym is a paradise-like planet and the location of the Blue Lantern Corps Power Battery.

=== Obsidian Deeps ===
The Obsidian Deeps are a sector of deep space.

=== Orlinda ===
Orinda is a secret base of operations for the Manhunters.

=== Ovacron Six ===
Ovacron Six is the homeworld of Green Lantern Hannu. Its inhabitants disdain the use of weapons and rely on their own strength.

=== Pandina ===
Pandina is the homeworld of Star Sapphire Remoni-Notra.

=== Qualar IV ===
Qualar IV is a planet primarily inhabited by humanoid chicken-like aliens. It is the homeworld of Green Lantern Perdoo.

=== Rao ===
Rao is a red star that orbits Krypton, named after the Kryptonian god of the same name. In The New 52, Rao is the name that Kryptonians give to LHS 2520, a star that exists in real life. Rao is also the main deity and sun god of Krypton, and personification of the star.

=== Rann ===
Rann is the adopted homeworld of Adam Strange, located in the Polara star system.

=== Ramnos ===
Ramnos is a homeworld devastated by the Traitor.

=== Rexulus System ===
Rexulus System is a star system of Sinestro Corps member Setag Retss.

=== Rojira ===
Rojira is the homeworld of the Ruulan Green Lanterns.

=== Ryut ===
Ryut is a dead planet and location of the Black Lantern Corps Power Battery.

=== Scylla ===
Scylla is a space of the Triarch.

=== Slyggia ===
Slyggia is the homeworld of Green Lantern Salaak.

=== Solar System ===
The fictional depiction of the Solar System.

==== Venus ====
Venus is the former homeworld of Mister Mind.

==== Earth ====
Earth is the main setting of most DC Comics stories. In the third volume of Shazam, it is also called the Earthlands.

===== Luna =====
The Moon, also referred to as Luna, is the location of the Justice League Watchtower and the former homeworld of Eclipso.

==== Mars ====
Mars is the former homeworld of the Martian Manhunter, his fellow Green Martians, and the White Martians.

==== Saturn ====
Saturn is orbited by the lunar homeworlds of the Faceless Hunter, Jemm, and the Red and White Saturnian races.

===== Klaramar =====
Klaramar is a subatomic lunar world and the home of the Faceless Hunters.

==== Sol ====
Sol is the native white-yellow star and the source of Kryptonian superpowers on Earth.

=== Southern Goldstar ===
Southern Goldstar is the homeworld of Green Lantern Olapet.

=== Sputa ===
Sputa is the bacterial homeworld of the Green Lantern Larvox.

=== Talok III ===
Talok III is the homeworld of former Starman Mikaal Tomas.

=== Talok IV ===
Talok IV is the homeworld of Sinestro Corps member Lyssa Drak.

=== Talok VIII ===
Talok VIII is the homeworld of Legion of Super-Heroes member Shadow Lass.

=== Tanjent ===
Tanjent is the homeworld to psionic children.

=== Tchk-Tchk ===
Tchk-Tchk is the homeworld of the Tchkii Legion.

=== Thanotopsia ===
Thanotopsia is the homeworld destroyed by Lobo using nuclear weapons.

=== Thanagar ===
Thanagar is the former homeworld of the Thanagarian race, including Hawkman, Hawkwoman, and their enemy Byth Rok. It has been destroyed on two occasions: by Superboy-Prime in Infinite Crisis and a mind-controlled Mogo in Green Lantern (vol. 7).

==== Thanagar in other media ====
- Thanagar appears in the Justice League episode "Starcrossed".
- Thanagar appears in the Legion of Super Heroes episode "Dark Victory".
- Thanagar appears in the My Adventures with Superman episode "The Machine Who Would Be Empire". This version was among several planets invaded by Brainiac.

=== Thar ===
Thar is a living star once worshipped by aliens.

==== Zintha ====
Zintha is an icy planet that orbits Thar.

=== Thordia ===
Thordia is a planet located near Cetus and the homeworld of Darkstars enemy Pay-Back.

=== Thoron ===
Thoron is a planet in the same solar system as Krypton. Its inhabitants gain superpowers under a yellow sun, but are not as strong as Kryptonians. It is the homeworld of Halk Kar.

=== Throneworld ===
Throneworld is the capital of a galactic empire. It is ruled by former Starman Prince Gavyn.

=== Thronn ===
Thronn is the homeworld of the Thronnians and the Honor Team of Thronn.

=== Toomey VI ===
Toomey VI is the homeworld of Green Lanterns Arkkis Chummuck and Barreer Wot.

=== Transilvane ===
Transilvane is an artificial miniature planet created by Dabney Donovan to simulate extraterrestrial environments and was populated with DNAliens resembling classic horror movie monsters, including the vampire-like Dragorin and the werewolf-like Lupek. Seven houses claim territory on Transilvane: the Vampires led by Lord Dragorin, the Werewolves led by Lupek and his daughter Hood, the Frankenstein Monsters led by Lord Bludd, the Zombies, the Mummies, the Ghouls, and the Grotesques.

==== Transilvane in other media ====
Transilvane appears in Supergirl.

=== Trigus VIII ===
Trigus VIII is the homeworld of the Femazons.

=== Tristram ===
Tristram is the homeworld of Green Lantern M'Dahna of Sector 2751.

=== Trogk ===
Trogk is the homeworld of Sinestro Corps member Moose.

=== Tront ===
Tront is the homeworld of Green Lantern Eddore.

=== Ungara ===
Ungara is the homeworld of Green Lantern Abin Sur.

=== Vegan star system ===
The Vegan star system is a neighboring star system of 25 planets which are the homeworlds of many races, including the Omega Men.

==== Citadel Homeworld ====
The Citadel Homeworld is a planet in the Vegan star system.

==== Karna ====
Karna is the homeworld of the Gordanians.

==== Hnyxx ====
Hnyxx is a planet in the Vegan star system.

==== Okaaru ====
Okaara is the homeworld of the Warlords of Okaara and the location of the Orange Lantern power battery.

==== Ogyptu ====
Ogyptu is the homeworld of an interplanetary giant race.

==== Tamaran ====
Tamaran is the homeworld of Starfire and her evil sister Blackfire. It was destroyed by the Psions in New Titans. Tamaran was restored to existence following The New 52 reboot.

===== Tamaran in other media =====
- Tamaran appears in Teen Titans.
- Tamaran appears in Titans.
- Tamaran appears in the Harley Quinn episode "Breaking Brainiac".

==== Prison Planet ====
The unidentified Prison Planet is a planet in the Vegan star system.

==== Slagg ====
Slagg is a planet in the Vegan star system.

==== Uxor ====
Uxor is a planet in the Vegan star system.

==== Wombworld ====
Wombworld is a planet in the Vegan star system.

=== Ventura ===
Ventura is the "gamblers' planet" and the homeworld of the villainous Rokk and Sorban.

=== Vivarium ===
Vivarium is an artificial planet of the Ayries.

=== Vulcan ===
Vulcan is the homeworld of Green Lantern Saarek.

=== Xanshi ===
Xanshi is a planet of bird-like beings and the homeworld of the villain Fatality. Green Lantern John Stewart was blamed for its destruction.

=== Xudar ===
Xudar is the homeworld of Green Lantern Tomar-Re and his son Tomar-Tu.

=== Ydoc ===
Ydoc is a gladiatorial planet. The homeworld of Green Lantern Vandor.

=== Ysmault ===
Ysmault is the homeworld of the Empire of Tears and the location of the Red Lantern Corps Power Battery.

=== Zakkaria ===
Zakkaria is the homeworld of the Crimson Star Mob.

=== Zamaron ===
Zamaron is the homeworld of the Zamarons and the Violet Lantern Corps.

=== Zebron ===
Zebron is a planet of plant-like people threatened by the Ravagers from Olys.

=== Planets and moons which exist during the era of the Legion of Super-Heroes ===
Besides the planets listed above, the following planets exist during the era of the Legion of Super-Heroes.

==== Aarok ====
Aarok is a planet colonized by Earth natives in the future. It is the homeworld of XS.

==== Aleph ====
Aleph is the homeworld of Kinetix; formerly populated by a magical civilization.

==== Angtu ====
Angtu is the homeworld of Mano, who destroyed it with his disintegration powers.

==== Baaldur ====
Baaldur is the homeworld of Glorith.

==== Bgztl ====
Bgztl is the homeworld of Phantom Girl, whose natives have the power of intangibility. It is located parallel to Earth in another dimension.

==== Bismoll ====
Bismoll is the homeworld of Tenzil Kem (also known as Matter-Eater Lad). The people of Bismoll have the ability to eat and digest all forms of matter, which they evolved by genetically engineering themselves after a radioactive dust cloud surrounded and isolated their planet and deadly microbes ravaged their food supplies.

==== Braal ====
Braal is the homeworld of Cosmic Boy, his younger brother Magnetic Kid, and Magno. Braalians possess the power of magnetism, which they gained via genetic engineering to fend off hostile metallic creatures.

==== Cargg ====
Cargg is a planet within a triple star system and the homeworld of Luornu Durgo. The Carggites have the ability to split into three individuals.

==== Dryad ====
Dryad is the homeworld of Blok. After the planet is destroyed by its unstable radioactive core, its natives enter hibernation and are sent into space until they land on a planet capable of sustaining them.

==== Durla ====
Durla is the homeworld of Chameleon Boy and his race of shapeshifters. They evolved this ability after a devastating nuclear war that destroyed most life on the planet; as a result, they took on drastically different forms, and their original form is unknown.

===== Durla in other media =====
- Durla appears in the Legion of Super Heroes episode "Who Am I?".
- Durla appears in the Young Justice episode "Death and Rebirth".

==== Hajor ====
Hajor is the homeworld of the telekinetic mutant Kid Psycho.

==== Hykraius ====
Hykraius is the homeworld of Tellus.

==== Imsk ====
Imsk is the homeworld of Shrinking Violet. Imskians are able to shrink to tiny, even microscopic, size at will. Imsk has also been rumored to shrink on occasion, but this have never been proven.

==== Kathoon ====
Kathoon is a perpetually dark planet with no sun and the homeworld of Night Girl.

==== Korbal ====
Korbal is an planetoid in the same solar system as Winath. Garth, Ayla, and Mekt Ranzz obtained electrical powers on Korbal after being attacked by Lightning Beasts.

===== Korbal in other media =====
- Korbal appears in the Legion of Super Heroes episode "Chained Lightning".

==== Labyrinth ====
The Labyrinth is a prison planet and the successor of Takron-Galtos.

==== Lallor ====
Lallor is the homeworld of the Heroes of Lallor, consisting of Duplicate Boy, Evolvo Lad, Gas Girl, Life Lass, and Beast Boy. It was previously a warlike world, which led to most life being destroyed and its remaining inhabitants becoming peaceful to make up for their past.

==== Lupra ====
Lupra is the homeworld of Color Kid.

==== Lythyl ====
Lythyl is a volcanic planet containing the Dimensional Nexus, a gateway to any point in the universe. It is the homeworld of the second Karate Kid.

==== Mardru ====
Mardru is the homeworld of Chlorophyll Kid.

==== Myar ====
Myar is the "alchemists' planet" and the homeworld of Nemesis Kid.

==== Naltor ====
Naltor is the homeworld of Dream Girl. The inhabitants of Naltor have a matriarchal society and possess dream-based precognition.

==== Nullport ====
Nullport is a planetoid famed for the construction of spacecraft.

==== Orando ====
Orando is the medieval homeworld of Princess Projectra (also known as Sensor Girl). Its inhabitants are largely emigrants from Gemworld and possess a feudal society. In post-Zero Hour continuity, the Orandans are snake-like aliens.

==== Phlon ====
Phlon is the homeworld of Chemical King. It has a large amount of valuable minerals under its surface, making it important to the United Planets.

==== Puppet Planetoid ====
The Puppet Planetoid is an uninhabited planet where Blok lived before being killed by Roxxas.

==== Rawl ====
Rawl (also spelled Raal) is a planet originating from the Legion of Super Heroes animated series. It is an uninhabited planet rich in wildlife that Brin Londo lived on during his childhood.

==== Rimbor ====
Rimbor is the homeworld of Ultra Boy. It is located near a heavily mined asteroid belt and serves as a base for miners.

===== Rimbor in other media =====
- Rimbor appears in Young Justice.

==== Shanghalla ====
Shanghalla is an asteroid that serves as a cemetery for the galaxy's greatest superheroes.

==== Shwar ====
Shwar is the homeworld of Fire Lad. Its atmosphere is low in oxygen, causing its inhabitants to have low metabolism and fire to be nearly absent.

==== Somahtur ====
Somahtur is the homeworld of Infectious Lass. It is largely unknown due to being only recently discovered and under quarantine from the United Planets.

==== Starhaven ====
Starhaven is a planet colonized by Native Americans, located near the center of the Milky Way. It is the homeworld of Dawnstar.

==== Takron-Galtos ====
Takron-Galtos is a planet-sized prison built to house the most dangerous criminals in the galaxy. It exists in the 20th century, but is more prominently featured in the 31st-century setting of Legion of Super-Heroes as a prison for many of the Legion's enemies.

Takron-Galtos is destroyed by a wave of anti-matter during Crisis on Infinite Earths and replaced with the planet Labyrinth. Takron-Galtos later appears in Final Crisis: Legion of 3 Worlds, where it is devastated by Superboy-Prime.

===== Takron-Galtos in other media =====
- Takron-Galtos appears in Legion of Super Heroes.

==== Titan ====
Titan is a moon of Saturn and the homeworld of Saturn Girl, Saturn Queen, and Esper Lass. All Titanians possess telepathy.

==== Tharr ====
Tharr is the homeworld of Polar Boy. It is among the hottest planets in its galaxy, which led some of its inhabitants to undergo genetic engineering to evolve the ability to project intense cold.

==== Trom ====
Trom is the homeworld of Element Lad, the last survivor of his planet's element-transmuting race. The planet has high levels of radiation, with the Trommites evolving within a valley with lesser levels and gaining their abilities from passive radiation exposure.

==== Vonn ====
Vonn is a planet invaded by the Tython.

==== Vengar ====
Vengar is a tropical world and the home of Emerald Empress. After gaining her powers, she takes over the planet before its people overthrow her.

==== Weber's World ====
Weber's World is an artificial planet and the headquarters of the United Planets.

==== Winath ====
Winath is an agricultural colony where twin births are the norm. It is the homeworld of siblings Garth Ranzz, Ayla Ranzz, and Mekt Ranzz.

===== Winath in other media =====
- Winath appears in Legion of Super Heroes.

==== Xanthu ====
Xanthu is the homeworld of Star Boy and Atmos. It is largely inhabited by scientists, who constructed space stations to study the stars.

==== Zerox ====
Zerox is a planet inhabited by sorcerers that was formerly called Gemworld before moving into the "main" dimension.

===== Zerox in other media =====
- Zerox appears in Legion of Super Heroes. This version is an isolated bureaucracy that is hidden by a cloaking spell.

==== Zuun ====
Zuun (originally spelled Zoon) is the homeworld of Timber Wolf (Brin Londo) and his father Mar Londo. It is a formerly prosperous Zuunium-mining colony within a triple star system that became uninhabitable due to excessive mining, with its remaining inhabitants moving underground.

===== Zuun in other media =====
- Zuun appears in the Legion of Super Heroes episode "Brain Drain". This version orbits a red sun.

==== Zwen ====
Zwen is the homeworld of Stone Boy. Its inhabitants developed the ability to transform into stone to survive their planet's long periods of darkness and multiple predatory species.

== Extradimensional realms ==
=== Azarath ===
Azarath is the homeworld of Raven.

==== Azarath in other media ====
- Azarath appears in Teen Titans.

=== Barter's Shop ===
Barter's Shop is a mysterious shop owned by Hawk and Dove's foe Barter. It is a dimensional nexus.

=== Bleed ===
The Bleed is a void between dimensions of the multiverse.

=== Darkworld ===
Darkworld is the birthplace of the Atlantean gods.

=== Deadlands ===
The Deadlands is the home of demons fought by Fate.

=== Destiny's Garden of Forking Ways ===
Destiny's Garden of Forking Ways is an endless labyrinth of possible histories.

=== Dreaming ===
The Dreaming is the realm of the sleeping mind. It is ruled by Dream of the Endless.

=== Dream Realm ===
Dream Realm is a realm where telepaths such as the Key reside. It is unrelated to the Dreaming.

=== Earth D ===
Earth D is the home of the Justice Alliance of America.

=== Emerald Space ===
Emerald Space is a dimensional space that serves as an afterlife for Green Lanterns who died in action.

=== Fifth Dimension ===
The Fifth Dimension is an interdimensional reality that exists outside the normal space-time continuum.

==== Zrrrf ====
Zrrrf is the homeland of fifth-dimensional entities, including Mister Mxyzptlk, Bat-Mite, Qwsp, and Thunderbolt.

=== Fourth World ===
==== Promethean Galaxy ====
Promethean Galaxy is the location of the Source.

===== Source Wall =====
The Source Wall is the edge of reality. It is home to the Promethean Giants, statues of various beings who failed to bypass the wall and were fused with it.

=== Ghost Zone ===
The Ghost Zone is a dimension which Prometheus uses to teleport interdimensionally. Wizard also possesses a key to the Ghost Zone.

=== Green Realm ===
The Green Realm is a dimension that houses the victims of Power Ring's weapon, the Ring of Volthoom.

=== Heaven ===
Heaven is an afterworld of the blessed.

=== Hell ===
Hell (a.k.a. Gehenna, Hades, Hel, Jahannam, Sheol and Tartarus) is a fictional location, an infernal Underworld utilized in various American comic book stories published by DC Comics. It is the locational antithesis of the Silver City in Heaven. The DC Comics location known as Hell is heavily based on its depiction in Abrahamic mythology. Although several versions of Hell had briefly appeared in other DC Comics publications in the past, the official DC Comics concept of Hell first appeared in Swamp Thing Annual #2 (1985), written by Alan Moore. The Vertigo imprint also has its own version of Hell, ruled by Lucifer Morningstar.

Hell is an alternate plane of reality, traditionally accessible only by those with demonic heritage, beings of a higher order, and damned souls. Throughout its history, Hell has been overtaken by the evil demons Neron and Satanus.

Hell is divided into nine Provinces, each of which have their own rulers and oversee different aspects of culture. The Provinces include Pandemonia, the Odium, the Gull, Praetori, Internecia, Ament, the Labyrinth, Err and Purgatory.

==== Hell in other media ====
- Hell appears in Lucifer.
- Hell appears in the fourth season of Legends of Tomorrow.
- Hell appears in The Sandman.
- Hell appers in Black Adam.

=== Ifé ===
Ifé is the other dimensional homeland of the African gods known as the Orishas, visited by the Spectre when he is searching for God.

=== Jejune Realm ===
Jejune Realm is a land of comical lesser gods from Vext.

=== Land of the Nightshades ===
The Land of the Nightshades is a realm of shadow-manipulators and the home of Nightshade.

=== Land of the Unliving ===
The Land of the Unliving is the home dimension of Nekron.

=== Limbo ===
Limbo is the void between realities was used as a prison of the Justice Society of America. Limbo first appeared in Ambush Bug #3 (August 1985) and was created by Keith Giffen. In Animal Man #25 (July 1990), Grant Morrison reintroduces Limbo, a dimension inhabited by old characters seemingly abandoned or forgotten by their publishers. The location reappeared decades later in Final Crisis: Superman Beyond, also by Morrison, as the world on the edge of the multiverse past the Graveyard Universe of Earth-51.

This "comic book limbo" is metafictional, based on the notion that any character who has not been published recently can be said to reside in "comic book limbo".

=== Magiclands ===
The Magiclands are seven different realms where magic reigns supreme. They can only be accessed via the Rock of Eternity.

==== Darklands ====
The Darklands are a place where the soul goes upon their death. It is also filled with ghosts, vampires, mummies, pumpkin monsters, and other spooky creatures. The ghosts of a past Marvel Family, Jeepers of the Monster Society of Evil, the Ghost Patrol, and a variation of Count Dracula reside here.

==== Earthlands ====
See Earth

==== Funlands ====
The Funlands are a place that is made up of one big amusement park and is ruled by King Kid. Due to his hatred for adults, any kid who turns 18 is placed in slavery to help maintain the Funlands. Mister Merry-Go-Round of the Monster Society of Evil is from the Funlands.

==== Gamelands ====
The Gamelands are a dimension that is based around the video game concept. It requires 1,000,000 points to access the CPU needed to leave the Gamelands. A version of the Atari Force lives here. Mister Atom of the Monster Society of Evil is from the Gamelands.

==== Monsterlands ====
The Monsterlands are a dimension where the Monster Society of Evil are imprisoned in its Dungeon of Eternity. Each of its inmates are gathered throughout the Magiclands including some from the Earthlands. Mister Mind stated to Doctor Sivana that the Monsterlands used to be called the Gods' Realm until Black Adam's betrayal, which led them to strip the gods of their powers and close the doors to the Magiclands. Evil Eye of the Monster Society of Evil originates from the Monsterlands. Superboy-Prime was briefly imprisoned in the Dungeon of Eternity.

==== Wildlands ====
The Wildlands are a dimension populated by anthropomorphic animals including Tawky Tawny. Because a tiger helped the humans in a revolution, all tigers are imprisoned in a zoo. Monster Society of Evil members Scapegoat and an unnamed three-headed Crocodile-Man originate from the Wildlands, with Mister Mind rumored to have come from there as well.

==== Wozenderlands ====
The Wozenderlands is a dimension that is a hybrid of the Land of Oz and Wonderland. It is inhabited by characters from fictional children's novels like the Cheshire Cat, the Scarecrow, the Tin Man, the White Rabbit, the winged monkeys, the talking trees, and the Wicked Witches. According to the Scarecrow, Dorothy Gale and Alice united the Land of Oz and Wonderland to save them from the threat of the Monsterlands. The Monster Society of Evil members Red Queen and the Wicked Witch of the West came from the Wozenderlands.

=== Meta-Zone ===
The Meta-Zone is the homeworld of Shade the Changing Man.

=== Mirror World ===
The Mirror World, also known as the Fourth Dimension, is the home of the Duomalians and the Orinocas. Originally discovered by Zatara, it was later rediscovered by the Mirror Master.

=== Mount Olympus ===
Mount Olympus is the home of the Olympian Gods.

=== Myrra ===
Myrra is a realm of sword and sorcery. Former home of Nightmaster.

=== Oblivion Bar ===
The Oblivion Bar is an extra-dimensional bar that only magically talented persons can access. Headquarters of the Shadowpact.

=== Omega Realm ===
The Omega Realm is an extra-dimensional realm from which Darkseid accesses the Omega Effect.

=== Paradise Dimension ===
The Paradise Dimension is a dimension where Superboy-Prime gains his powers.

=== Pax Dimension ===
The Pax Dimension is a dimension where the Bloodline Parasites come from.

=== Pocket Universe ===
Earth-23, colloquially named the Pocket Universe, was created by the Time Trapper to trap the Legion of Super-Heroes after the Superman of Earth-One was folded into New Earth.

==== Pocket Universe in other media ====
The Pocket Universe appears in Superman. This version was created by Lex Luthor using a megacollider.

=== Purgatory ===
Purgatory is an afterlife location where souls atone for their crimes.

=== Pytharia ===
Pytharia is an Earth-like realm resembling prehistoric history.

=== Qward ===
Qward is an antimatter universe and counterpart to Oa that was created by Krona alongside the multiverse. It is home to the Anti-Monitor, one incarnation of the Crime Syndicate of America, and the Weaponers of Qward, the last of whom created the yellow power rings.

==== In other media ====
- Qward appears in Super Friends.
- Qward appears in Batman: The Brave and the Bold.
- Qward appears in Green Lantern: First Flight.

=== Rock of Eternity ===
The Rock of Eternity is the lair of the Wizard Shazam, the ancient Egyptian mage who grants Captain Marvel and the Marvel Family their powers. The Rock resembles a large, barren mountain and is positioned at the center of space and time. Surrounding the Rock are mists representing space and time; navigating through them allows the Marvels to travel to specific locations in time and space.

In The New 52 continuity, the Rock of Eternity was originally located in the North African kingdom of Kahndaq. A council of seven Wizards ruled over all earthly magic from the Rock, dispatching champions to serve them on Earth by harnessing their powers. Black Adam, the champion of Council of Eternity lead wizard Shazam, went rogue and killed the other Wizards, leading Shazam to imprison Adam and hide the Rock and all magic from the world.

==== Rock of Eternity in other media ====
- The Rock of Eternity appears in The Kid Super Power Hour with Shazam!
- The Rock of Eternity appears in Batman: The Brave and the Bold.
- The Rock of Eternity appears in Justice League Action.
- The Rock of Eternity appears in Shazam! and its sequel Shazam! Fury of the Gods.

=== Savoth ===
Savoth is a planet that is the homeworld of the Savothians, camel-like aliens and longtime friends of the Flash. It is located in another dimension that can only be accessed by the Speed Force.

=== Shadowlands ===
The Shadowlands is a place of primordial darkness. It is the power source for Obsidian and the Shade, among others.

In post-Flashpoint continuity, the Shadowlands was created by Eclipso following his fall from Heaven, acting as an embodiment of his darkness and hatred.

==== Shadowlands in other media ====
- The Shadowlands appear in the second season of Stargirl.

=== Silver City ===
Silver City is the abode of the Presence and His angels.

=== Sixth Dimension ===
The Sixth Dimension is the "Multiverse Control Room" which exists outside of space and time and is largely only accessible to cosmic entities. It is the home of Monitor, the Anti-Monitor, and the World Forger, all of whom regenerate within the dimension if killed.

=== Skartaris ===
Skartaris is a magic dimension located "within" the Earth. It is the home of Travis Morgan, the Warlord.

==== Skartaris in other media ====
- Skartaris appears in the Justice League Unlimited episode "Chaos at the Earth's Core".
- Skartaris appears in Justice League: Warworld.

=== Speed Force Dimension ===
The Speed Force Dimension is a dimension whose energy empowers all speedsters.

==== Speed Force Dimension in other media ====
- The Speed Force Dimension appears in The Flash.

=== Tantu Totem ===
The Tantu Totem worn by Vixen contains the extradimensional home of the African god Anansi.

=== Teall ===
Teall is an alternate dimension home to microscopic energy beings. Quislet of the Legion of Super-Heroes is a Teallian.

=== Timestream ===
The Timestream is a dimension where time is expressed spatially. Home of the Timepoint; also called Vanishing Point, headquarters of the Linear Men.

=== Timepoint ===
Timepoint is a prison outside of time.

=== Wintersgate Manor ===
Wintersgate Manor is a dimensional nexus and the home of Baron Winters, leader of the Night Force.

=== Xarapion ===
Xarapion is the homeworld of Thar Dan, the inventor of the Dimensiometer belt given to the Shadow Thief.

== See also ==
- List of DC Comics characters
- List of DC Comics teams and organizations
- List of criminal organizations in DC Comics
- List of fictional towns in comics
- List of government agencies in DC Comics
- Features of the Marvel Universe
