= Human Flame =

DC Comics supervvillain

- The Human Flame as depicted in Justice League of America (vol. 2) #21 (July 2008); art by Carlos Pacheco.

Publication information
- Publisher: DC Comics
- First appearance: Detective Comics #274 (December 1959)
- Created by: Jack Miller (writer); Joe Certa (art)

In-story information
- Full name: Michael Miller
- Team affiliations: The Society
- Abilities: Formerly: Use of a special flamethrowing suit Cybernetic enhancements Implanted miniaturized flamethrowers in hands, mouth, forehead and belly Currently: Molten, radioactive body Ability to increase his mass and density Ability to create and command flames

The Human Flame (Michael Miller) is a supervillain in DC Comics' main shared universe. He is mostly known as an enemy of Martian Manhunter.

== Publication history ==
He first appeared in Detective Comics #274 (December 1959), and was created by Jack Miller and Joe Certa.

The character was not used again for 48 years before reappearing in Final Crisis. The writer, Grant Morrison, explained why they picked such an obscure character:

With The Human Flame, I wanted a Martian Manhunter villain, and I couldn't find a really good one. Then, looking through the old Showcase Presents books, I discovered this stupid guy called Mike, who declared himself to be The Human Flame. And he wore a homemade costume with six nipples that shot flames. So I just thought this is a great way to start this book because the idea is that Libra gives all the villains a very simple choice, he says, 'Follow me and I'll give you your heart's desire'. And that's it. And some of the villains naturally say, 'Prove it'. So the Human Flame is one of the first to fall in with Libra and he says, 'If you can get revenge on my old enemy, who has had me stuck in jail for the last five years, I'll follow you anywhere'. I needed a small-scale dumb guy, who could make very big waves and open the book with a shock moment and The Human Flame fit the bill.

Human Flame is featured in the Final Crisis tie-in Final Crisis Aftermath: Run!, written by Lilah Sturges with art by Freddie Williams II.

== Fictional character biography ==
Michael Miller, the Human Flame, was a minor villain who, early in his career, was captured by the Martian Manhunter and incarcerated. He was the first actual supervillain the Manhunter faced.

After this one-off appearance, he was not seen in publication for nearly fifty years. In 2008's Justice League of America (vol. 2), he was seen robbing a bank, leading to a reluctant confrontation with Red Arrow and Hawkgirl. It was stated in this issue that, in-universe, eight years had passed since his arrest in Detective Comics #274.

=== Final Crisis ===
In Final Crisis, the Human Flame enlists with Libra and the Secret Society of Super Villains. As a reward for joining the Society, Libra promises the Human Flame power and his heart's desire: "revenge against the Martian Manhunter". Libra kills Martian Manhunter with his flaming staff while the Human Flame looks on, his wish having been the first granted by Libra.

The Human Flame is given a new upgraded suit by Libra that contains the Anti-Life Equation, turning him into a mindless drone known as a Justifier. Libra uses the Human Flame, among other Justifiers, to persuade Lex Luthor to swear allegiance to Darkseid or be turned into a Justifier.

In the limited series Final Crisis Aftermath: Run!, the Human Flame is pursued by the Kyrgyzstan mafia, the villains that Libra enslaved during Final Crisis, and Justice League members John Stewart and Firestorm. His costume is badly damaged during a fight with the mob, and the Human Flame seeks out Heat Wave, hoping to purchase one of his signature flamethrower guns. Heat Wave refuses, denounces the Human Flame as "pathetic", and gives him a harsh beating. Wounded and unable to afford health care, the Human Flame visits General Immortus who turns him over to Professor Milo. Milo fixes his injuries, and adds cybernetic parts, including flamethrowers in his chest, mouth and arms. To ensure the Human Flame's loyalty, Immortus has his flamethrowers rigged to cause intense pain whenever he uses them.

The Human Flame later attempts some freelance jobs, stealing from a bank with the help of Seductress (one of the augmented henchmen and lover of Immortus himself) and swaying her to his side, but he is quickly discovered and charged with treason by Milo and Immortus, who try to shut down his powers with a remote control. With Seductress rushing to his aid, the Human Flame is able to escape, destroying the remote but injuring himself in the process.

Human Flame discovers that his new cyborg body has regenerative abilities that fix the broken jaw suffered during his escape. He fights his former allies successfully, killing them all until Immortus shuts down his powers with a secondary, wireless remote. The Human Flame regains his powers by sheer will, badly burning Immortus. He tortures Milo to get further augmentations to put him on par with the Justice League and everyone else wanting vengeance against him. Milo sends him to S.T.A.R. Labs to get himself infused with atomic energy in a new experimental process. There, Human Flame and Seductress are attacked by a Hyper-Griffin, alerting a lone scientist who agrees to give Human Flame the energy infusion to dispatch the Hyper-Griffin, although the energy infusion is temporary unless Human Flame can reach a nearby nuclear power plant and bathe in its energies. Despite the risks, he leaves Seductress behind and manipulates John Stewart into dunking him in the main reactor.

Despite the magnitude of the explosion, so powerful that the heroes barely manage to contain it, the Human Flame emerges as a fiery, radioactive being able to increase his mass and density. Calling himself the Inhuman Flame, he rampages through the city until he increases his mass to such a degree that he becomes immobile. Firestorm, Red Tornado, and John Stewart take him to outer space, tethered to a heat-dispersing rod to sap his powers.

=== DC Rebirth ===
In 2016, DC Comics implemented another relaunch of its books called DC Rebirth, which restored its continuity to a form much as it was prior to The New 52 reboot. Human Flame was seen at a western hotel where the Legion of Doom Villains Mixer was being held.

Black Manta's former Manta Men Devil Ray worked with Human Flame and his henchmen Red and Orange before betraying and killing him to obtain his technology and taking Red and Orange in.

== Powers and abilities ==
In his initial appearance, the Human Flame has no powers, but wields several flamethrowers. In Final Crisis, he is transformed into a cyborg with flamethrower implants, and later into a fiery humanoid who can increase his mass and density at will.

== In other media ==
- The Human Flame appears as a character summon in Scribblenauts Unmasked: A DC Comics Adventure.
- The Human Flame makes a non-speaking cameo appearance in the Harley Quinn episode "Something Borrowed, Something Green".
