= Big Science Action =

DC Comics superhero team

- Big Science Action from Final Crisis #2, left to right: Boss Bosozuko, Rising Sun, Junior Waveman, Hammersuit Zero-X, Ultimon, Cosmo Racer, Goraiko, art by J. G. Jones.

Publication information
- Publisher: DC Comics
- First appearance: Final Crisis Sketchbook #1 (May 2008)
- Created by: Grant Morrison (writer); J. G. Jones (artist)

In-story information
- Type of organization: Superhero
- Base(s): Fuji Station (Mount Fuji)
- Agent(s): Boss Bosozuko; Cosmo Racer; Goraiko; Hammersuit Zero-X; Junior Waveman; Rising Sun; Sunburst; Ultimon

Big Science Action is a superhero team published by DC Comics. They first appeared in Final Crisis Sketchbook #1 (May 2008), and were created by Grant Morrison and J. G. Jones.

== Publication history ==
Big Science Action debuted in Final Crisis Sketchbook #1. Some of the founding members of Big Science Action, such as Rising Sun, Sunburst, and Goraiko, are pre-existing DC Comics characters. According to Morrison, "these guys were Japan's JLA back in the day, with a ring or halo-shaped base hovering above Mount Fuji".

== History ==
The Big Science Action team are seen together for the first time as they appeared in the "Silver Age" of Japanese superheroics, in a Tokyo television documentary retrospective in the pages of Final Crisis #2 (June 2008). During this appearance Rising Sun complains about the ongoing process of self commodification being carried out by modern Japanese superheroes such as the Super Young Team.

An updated version of Big Science Action appears in Final Crisis Aftermath: Dance #4. In this issue, Junior Waveman Kimura invites his daughter Shiny Happy Aquazon from the Super Young Team to join the team and introduces her to new team member Nazo Baluda.

In Doomsday Clock, a variation of Big Science Action is featured called Big Monster Action. Besides Rising Sun, Goriako, and Hammersuit Zero-X, the other members listed are Judomaster, Naiad, Ram, and Samurai.

== Founding members ==
=== Boss Bosozuko ===
Boss Bosozuko is a hotheaded motorcycle rider whose hair is made of nuclear fire. His name Bōsōzoku translates as "violent running gang", and stems from the Japanese Bōsōzoku motorcycle gangs of the 1950s.

=== Cosmo Racer ===
Cosmo Racer is an extraterrestrial android who requires special crystals to power his "roller boots" up for interstellar travel. According to his creator Grant Morrison: "What only we know is that his 'Maker' is a monstrous space tyrant who has sent his little herald out to identify and pacify target planets". Using his roller boots, Cosmo Racer can travel at the speed of sound. His body is made from an unknown, nearly frictionless alien material similar in texture to terrestrial ceramics or plastics.

=== Goraiko ===
Goraiko is a psionic construct projected by an unnamed girl who resides in a high-tech sensory deprivation tank. The Goraiko construct only speaks in haiku and mathematical equations. Grant Morrison described Goraiko: "I also threw in Goraiko, the 'Nuclear Totoro' character I created for the Ultramarine Corps back in the JLA days and changed his colour as a little tip of the hat to gray Hulk/green Hulk". He is a member of the International Ultramarine Corps.

=== Hammersuit Zero-X ===
Miss Kusanagi is a Japanese schoolgirl who pilots a powered armor known as a "Hammersuit". The Hammersuit appears to use electric drills as weapons. The suit of armor can also act autonomously, and is based on both Gundam and Gigantor. An older version of Kusanagi appears in Final Crisis Aftermath: Dance #4, where her real name is revealed. As an adult, Kusanagi uses upgraded iterations of the Hammersuit to "stay competitive".

=== Junior Waveman ===
Riki Kimura, the Junior Waveman, is a member of the Wavemen, a Japanese version of the Sea Devils. The group was formerly led by Senior Waveman Otomo who died while saving Kimura's life. He was rescued and raised by the Wavemen after his parents were killed by monsters. He is also the father of Shiny Happy Aquazon, a member of the Super Young Team. As of Final Crisis Aftermath: Dance #4, he is now the much older Senior Waveman Kimura.

=== Rising Sun ===
Izumi Yasunari, also known as Rising Sun, is a prominent Japanese solar physicist, and a veteran member of the Global Guardians. A drunken, unshaven and overweight Rising Sun appears in Final Crisis Aftermath: Dance #1.

=== Sunburst ===
Takeo Sato, the original Sunburst, was a stuntman and actor and a founding member of Big Science Action. He died during the events of Crisis on Infinite Earths.

=== Ultimon ===
Dai Yokohama, also known as Ultimon, comes from a line of Super Sentai dedicated to fighting kaiju, known as the Ultimon Society. The Ultimon Society are a group of giant monster killers who survived the "Monster Wars" that nearly destroyed Japan. Ultimon's master died during the battle and he inherited his powers. The ghost of a being calling itself Ultimon Alpha has been appearing in recurring visions witnessed by Most Excellent Superbat, in Final Crisis Aftermath: Dance #1.

== Later members ==
=== Boss Bishonen ===
Boss Bishonen is introduced in Final Crisis Aftermath: Dance #4. He is described by Senior Waveman Kimura as the successor to Boss Bosozuko and "carries the torch of a grand tradition of fiery champions". His name is a reference to Bishōnen, a Japanese term which translates as "beautiful young male".

=== Nazo Baluda ===
Nazo Baluda is introduced in Final Crisis Aftermath: Dance #4. She is described by Senior Waveman Kimura as the team's "dark star stealth warrior". The Japanese word nazo translates as riddle, enigma or mystery, and the name Baluda is a reference to the character Dominatrix Baluda from Yume No Senshi Uwingu Man.

=== Shiny Happy Aquazon ===
Shiny Happy Aquazon is the daughter of Senior Waveman Kimura, the current leader of Big Science Action. She was a founding member of the Super Young Team, and is invited to join Big Science Action by her father in Final Crisis Aftermath: Dance #4. She later declines her membership, with her teammates Atomic Lantern and Superbat reminding her of the obligation she still has to her original group. Kimura still thinks that her membership in the Big Science Action team is her birthright.

== Equipment ==
Fuji Station is Big Science Action's halo-shaped base of operations, which hovers above Mount Fuji. Fuji Station is equipped with a working teleporter system.
