= Libra (DC Comics) =

- Libra meets with The Society; interior artwork by Doug Mahnke from DC Universe #0 (2008).

Publication information
- Publisher: DC Comics
- First appearance: Justice League of America #111 (June 1974)
- Created by: Len Wein (script); Dick Dillin (art)

In-story information
- Alter ego: Justin Ballantine
- Team affiliations: Injustice Gang; The Society
- Notable aliases: Equinox
- Abilities: Superpower absorption

Libra is a supervillain appearing in comic books published by DC Comics. He first appeared in Justice League of America #111 (May–June 1974), where he formed the first incarnation of the Injustice Gang. Libra made his return with a leading role in Final Crisis in 2008.

== Publication history ==
Libra's only major appearance, prior to his appearance in Final Crisis, was in Justice League of America #111, in 1974. In 2004, he made a brief cameo in the JLA/Avengers crossover series by Kurt Busiek and George Pérez.

Final Crisis writer Grant Morrison explained their reason for picking an obscure villain:

The reason I chose them was because Libra came from my favorite ever run of 'Justice League of America' and he's never been used again. He was a character who had stolen all the powers of the Justice League, but then couldn't handle it and ascended to some kind of screaming godhood where he became a million transparent body parts spread across the sky. So I thought if I was doing a thing about the New Gods, he'd be an interesting guy to bring back because I needed a masked mystery man to start a new recruitment drive for the Secret Society of Supervillains (sic), because they become almost a terrorist sect. Under Libra's guidance, they start doing quite bad things, even to superheroes' wives and families, crossing the line. So there's that element to the story and I needed a masked guy, who people didn't really know that well. And I remembered Libra and the fact that he is connected to this ascending to godhood thing tied him in really quite nicely. What's really going on under the hood will be revealed later in the series.

In May 2008, his appearances were reprinted in DC Universe Special: Justice League of America at the same time as he was reintroduced, along with the Human Flame, in Justice League of America #21. He returns, apparently retaining the full might of his godlike status, to lead a new and final incarnation of the Secret Society of Super-Villains, this time offering to every villain, from simple costumed crooks to major ones, the realization of his/her fondest wish.

The full origins of Libra and the connection between his original appearance and Final Crisis was then made apparent in a one-shot story by his original creator, Len Wein, in Final Crisis: Secret Files #1 in December 2008.

== Fictional character biography ==
Libra's backstory is given in Final Crisis: Secret Files #1. Real name Justin Ballantine, he lost his mother at the age of eight due to an alcoholic pharmacist mismeasuring medicine his mother needed. Justin would later use all the money he had to buy a telescope so that he could stargaze and imagine a better life among the stars. Soon afterward, his father turned to alcoholism himself and became abusive. He threatened to beat him with his telescope, but lost his balance and fell to his death, which led Justin to see the importance of balance.

Libra is a secret founder of the Injustice Gang, given control by a mysterious benefactor. He constructs an unusual device, the Transmortifier, which allows him to steal half the power and energy of its target. Libra attempts to spread the Transmortifier's effect across the universe, hoping to gain cosmic power. Instead, Libra is absorbed into the universe itself, effectively disintegrating him and spreading his essence across the cosmos. He is resurrected by DeSaad and promises eternal loyalty to Darkseid.

Libra returns in Final Crisis controlling an army of super-villains and threatening the entire multiverse. He kills Martian Manhunter, who states that he is destined to fail. To prove his claims to Lex Luthor when he requests to draw Superman to him, Libra sends Clayface to bomb the Daily Planet building, injuring Lois Lane. Libra gives Human Flame a new base at the former swamp headquarters of the Legion of Doom and then gives him a new upgraded outfit. When Libra shoves a helmet on Human Flame, he is transformed into a mindless slave to the Anti-Life Equation. Libra then reveals himself as a prophet of Darkseid.

Lex Luthor tries to kill Libra, having concluded that Libra's effectiveness makes him too dangerous to be left alive, but Libra surrounds Luthor with Justifiers. He offers Luthor a choice to either swear an oath to Darkseid or become a mindless slave. Luthor is revealed to have been a mole working with a resistance against Darkseid and kills Libra.

Libra returns in Final Crisis: Rogues' Revenge, where he learns that the Rogues declined membership into his Secret Society. Many times and in many ways he attempts to recruit them, including threats against their families and revealing that Barry Allen had returned from the dead, but failed. As they walk away, Libra shouts that evil will win.

== In other media ==
Equinox, a character inspired by Libra, appears in Batman: The Brave and the Bold, voiced by Oded Fehr. He is an orphan raised by the Lords of Chaos and Order, who granted him godlike powers and tasked him with maintaining balance between good and evil. However, Equinox was overwhelmed by this and went rogue to pursue his own sense of balance. This brought him into multiple confrontations with Batman that culminate in Equinox's consciousness being scattered throughout space and time.
