= Sonny Sumo =

- Sonny Sumo as depicted in Forever People #5 (November 1971). Art by Jack Kirby (penciler) and Mike Royer (inker).

Publication information
- Publisher: DC Comics
- First appearance: Forever People #4 (September 1971)
- Created by: Jack Kirby

In-story information
- Alter ego: Sonny Sumo
- Team affiliations: Forever People; Super Young Team
- Abilities: Strength, durability, trained sumo wrestler

Sonny Sumo is a fictional sumo wrestler, a comic book superhero published by DC Comics. He first appeared briefly in Forever People #4 (September 1971) and was created by Jack Kirby.

== Publication history ==
Sonny Sumo first appeared briefly in Forever People #4 (September 1971) and was reintroduced in the pages of Final Crisis #2 (August 2008).

== Fictional character biography ==
Prior to his encounter with the Forever People, Sonny Sumo was an honorable figure who used his prowess in sumo to compete as an underground fighter. Unbeknownst to Sonny or his manager, Harry Sharp, Sonny contained a portion of the Anti-Life Equation that enhanced his ability to harness his qi. The Forever People were able to unlock the Equation's powers with their Mother Box, allowing him to recover permanently from wounds sustained in an organized battle against a robot called Sagutai. Sonny then joined the team in their battle against DeSaad, using his unique abilities to force Darkseid's minions into a deep sleep. This event earned Sonny and his allies the ire of Darkseid himself, who used his Omega Sanction to trap Sonny in feudal Japan.

=== Final Crisis ===
In the second issue of Final Crisis, Sonny Sumo is seen living in present-day Japan. His role as a fighter has earned him some level of celebrity with the pop-culture driven youths that frequent metahuman nightclubs, including Super Young Team. Shilo Norman discovers Sonny in the club after a battle, using a Mother Box to heal his wounds. Sonny joins Shilo in his quest to battle the New Gods who have fallen to Earth. They are soon joined by Super Young Team, before joining the remnants of Checkmate. Sonny Sumo eventually revealed that he was not the original Sonny, who eventually died after being transported to Japan. This Sonny was from Earth-51, an alternate universe.
