= Final Crisis =

Limited DC Comics crossover series

- Cover art of the Final Crisis hardcover by J. G. Jones

Publication information
- Publisher: DC Comics
- Schedule: Monthly
- Format: Limited series
- Genre: Superhero; Crossover
- Publication date: May 2008 – January 2009
- No. of issues: 7
- Main characters: Superman; Green Lantern; The Flash (Barry Allen); Batman; Wonder Woman; Libra; Captain Marvel; Supergirl; The Flash (Wally West); Darkseid; rest of DC Universe

Creative team
- Created by: Grant Morrison; J. G. Jones
- Written by: Grant Morrison
- Artists: J. G. Jones (1–6); Marco Rudy (5–6)
- Pencillers: Carlos Pacheco (4–6); Doug Mahnke (6–7)
- Inkers: Jesus Merino (4–6); Christian Alamy (6–7); Tom Nguyen (7); Drew Gerasi (7); Norm Rapmund (7); Rodney Ramos (7); Walden Wong (7); Doug Mahnke (7)
- Letterers: Rob Leigh (1–4); Travis Lanham (5, 7); Rob Clark (6)
- Colorists: Alex Sinclair; Pete Pantazis (6–7); Tony Aviña (7)
- Editors: Eddie Berganza; Adam Schlagman

Collected editions
- Hardcover: ISBN 1-4012-2281-1
- Paperback: ISBN 140122282X
- Absolute Final Crisis: ISBN 978-1-4012-3511-6

"Final Crisis" is a 2008 American comics crossover storyline that ran in books published by DC Comics, consisting of a central, eponymous seven-issue miniseries written by Grant Morrison, and a number of other tie-in books. Originally DC announced the project as being illustrated solely by J. G. Jones; artists Carlos Pacheco, Marco Rudy and Doug Mahnke later provided art for the series.

The storyline directly follows DC Universe #0 after the conclusion of the 51-issue Countdown to Final Crisis weekly limited series. Promotion about the limited series describes its story as "the day evil won". The series deals with alien villain Darkseid's plot to overthrow reality, and the subsequent death and corruption of various DC characters and their universe.

== Publication history ==
"Final Crisis" originated from several ideas Grant Morrison had when they returned to DC Comics in 2003. Morrison said, "I pitched a huge crossover event called Hypercrisis, which didn't happen for various reasons. Some of Hypercrisis went into Seven Soldiers, some went into All-Star Superman, some went into 52 and some of it found a home in 'Final Crisis'." According to Grant Morrison, work finally began on Final Crisis #1 in early 2006, with the intention of the series being a thematic and literal sequel to Seven Soldiers and 52, two projects that Morrison was heavily involved in at the time.

In a 2008 interview, Morrison stated that the common theme that unites their work on Batman, All-Star Superman, and Final Crisis, is "the death of western civilization." According to them, Final Crisis was "geared towards these feelings a lot of people had in the Western world after September 11. Danger all around, the world's not feeling stable, faith is lost. That happens in the DC Universe now on a bigger level. And then Darkseid comes in."

References to the "Infinite Crisis" storyline as the "middle Crisis" gave readers the impression there would be at least one additional major follow-up to "Crisis on Infinite Earths". A May 2007 teaser poster confirmed this speculation with the tagline: "Heroes die. Legends live forever."

"Final Crisis" was preceded by Countdown, a year-long weekly series which was meant as a follow-up to 52. Halfway through, the series was renamed Countdown to Final Crisis. However, the artwork met with delays. To keep the release on schedule, Countdown wrapped with issue #1 and its planned final issue (#0) was revamped as a 50 cent one-shot special called DC Universe #0. Besides hyping upcoming storylines such as "Batman R.I.P." and "Blackest Night," the issue was narrated by Barry Allen and featured Libra leading a group of super-villains in prayer for the "god of evil", Darkseid. The result is, as described by Morrison, that "we're watching him fall back through the present, into the past of Seven Soldiers where he finally comes to rest in the body of 'Boss Dark Side', the gangster from that story."

To help readers identify events pertinent to Final Crisis and other major DCU events as the crossover approached, a "Sightings" cover banner appeared on various DC comics as "signposts, marking important storybeats and moments throughout the DC Universe." The first such headers appeared on Justice League of America (vol. 2) #21 and Action Comics #866, respectively (the JLA issue featured Libra's return and his recruiting of the Human Flame).

The original intent was for Jones to pencil the whole series. Due to delays, however, Carlos Pacheco drew issues #4–6 with Jones and issue 7 was drawn entirely by Doug Mahnke. Jones said that "Any problems completing the series are my own. I love Doug Mahnke's art, and he would have probably been a better choice to draw this series in the first place."

In addition to the core limited series the larger storyline includes a number of tie-ins, including one-shots and limited series.

The one-shots comprise "Requiem," "Resist," "Secret Files" and "Submit". Also "Rage of the Red Lanterns" is the start of a storyline of the same name, that picks up on events in "Green Lantern: Secret Origin" and continues in Green Lantern #36–38. It starts as a tie-in because, according to writer Geoff Johns, "events in Final Crisis have motivated the Guardians to proceed further with their attempted containment of the light".

The limited series comprise Superman Beyond (a two issue mini-series also written by Grant Morrison), Legion of 3 Worlds (a five-issue limited series focusing on the different incarnations of the Legion of Super-Heroes), Revelations (a five-issue limited series), and Rogues' Revenge (a three-issue mini-series focused on the Flash Rogues).

== Plot ==
Following the final battle of the New Gods, Darkseid's spirit tumbles through time itself, coming to rest on Earth, where he, along with the spirits of the other evil gods of Apokolips, manifests himself in the body of a human being. Darkseid's "fall" has sundered reality, creating a singularity at the heart of creation, into which all of space and time are slowly being drawn, setting the stage for the evil god's final victory, to be claimed in his inevitable death. Through his agent Libra, he arranges for a huge army of super villains to be gathered, who capture and kill Martian Manhunter as the opening salvo of the conflict. Coinciding with the Manhunter's death is the arrival on Earth of Nix Uotan, an exiled member of the cosmic Monitors, who has been sentenced to become human as punishment for failure in his duties.

Following the trail of a group of missing child prodigies, detective Dan Turpin discovers the dying body of Darkseid's son, Orion. The Justice League of America liaise with the Green Lantern Corps to investigate the murder, deducing the cause of death to be a bullet of Radion (a substance toxic to New Gods) fired backward through time from the future. New God Granny Goodness, possessing the body of Green Lantern Kraken, stymies the investigation by framing Hal Jordan for the murder; when Batman deduces her true identity, she captures him and teleports him to Command D, a government bio-chemical weapons facility beneath the city of Blüdhaven that has fallen under the control of Darkseid's minions. Slowly becoming aware of the threat the evil gods pose, Alan Scott enacts "Article X", a superhero draft that readies Earth's metahuman forces for the coming war.

With Batman and Jordan removed from play, the New Gods continue to eliminate the greatest threats to Darkseid's plan. Wonder Woman, while investigating Bludhaven, is infected by the Morticoccus bacterium by a DeSaad-possessed Mary Marvel. Superman departs for the future to obtain a cure for Lois Lane after a bomb in the Daily Planet building mortally wounds her. The Silver Age Flash, Barry Allen, is resurrected from within the Speed Force by powers unknown and races back in time alongside Wally West in an attempt to outrun the Black Racer and stop the bullet that will kill Orion.

Turpin's search for the missing children leads him to the Dark Side Club, where he is confronted by Darkseid's human host, Boss Dark Side. Darkseid transfers his essence into Turpin's body and brings him to Command D, where the detective is subjected to bio-genetic restructuring to transform his body into a replica of Darkseid's original form. Concurrently, Darkseid's agents release the Anti-Life Equation through all of Earth's communications networks, spreading it across the entire planet. The two Flashes, having failed to prevent Orion's death, emerge from the time stream one month after the equation's release and discover that the minds of nearly the entire population have fallen under Darkseid's control, with its super-human victims having been transformed into a military force of "Justifiers".

With the help of the Tattooed Man, the Super Young Team, and former allies of the New Gods of New Genesis Shilo Norman and Sonny Sumo, small cells of super heroes who have managed to resist the equation discover a possible salvation: a symbol from the alphabet of the New Gods that will break the equation's control over minds; it had been gifted to the cave-boy Anthro by Metron in prehistoric times. Meanwhile, a huge battle erupts between the superheroes and the Justifiers in Blüdhaven, during which the equation-controlled Wonder Woman infects the heroes with Morticoccus, which strips the heroes of their powers. However, the loss of these troops is soon mitigated by the turning of Libra's Justifiers, control over whom is usurped by Lex Luthor and Doctor Sivana so they can help defeat Darkseid. These twists and turns are observed by Nix Uotan, whose powers and memories of his true nature are unlocked with the help of Metron and a mysterious ape-like figure in a robe.

Escaping confinement in Command D, Batman uses the Radion bullet to mortally wound Darkseid, while Darkseid in turn kills Batman with his Omega Beams. Superman returns to the present and tears Command D apart to recover Batman's corpse and faces off against Darkseid as the Flashes come racing into Blüdhaven, the Black Racer hot on their heels. As the heroes reach super-luminal velocity, time warps around the Flashes, creating the temporal eddy into which Darkseid fires the bullet, sending it back in time to kill Orion. Outpacing Omega Beams fired from the eyes of the humans in Darkseid's thrall, the Flashes lead both the beams and the Black Racer straight to Darkseid, finishing the job Batman had begun to kill him. Simultaneously, The Ray traces the Metron symbol across the face of the Earth in beams of light, liberating all those under the equation's control. The freed Wonder Woman uses her lasso of truth to release Darkseid's consciousness from Turpin's body.

Although physically bested, Darkseid's essence is still dragging all of reality into nothingness along with it. Time and space break down as the effect worsens, until eventually, only Superman is left in the darkness at the end of creation, struggling to complete a copy of the Miracle Machine, a wish-granting machine shown to him by Brainiac 5 during his trip to the future. Darkseid's essence re-emerges to claim the machine, but Superman destroys him for good by using the last of his super-powered breath to sing, countering the vibrational frequency of Darkseid's life force.

With Darkseid's end, however, the evil behind evils emerges: Mandrakk, the Dark Monitor, fallen father of Nix Uotan, who waits at the end of all things to consume what remains. Superman uses the solar energy in his own cells to power the Miracle Machine and makes a wish that is granted by the appearance of an army of Supermen from all across the multiverse. Nix Uotan joins the clash, using his Monitor powers to summon the Green Lantern Corps, the Zoo Crew, the Super Young Team, the armies of Heaven itself and more for a final battle with Mandrakk that culminates in the Corps spearing him with a stake made of pure light created by the combined energy of their rings. The heroes drag Earth out of the black hole that is Darkseid, and Nix Uotan returns to being human as the other Monitors cease to exist in accordance with the wish Superman had made: a wish for a happy ending.

In the distant past, Anthro dies of old age in a cave. His body is discovered by Bruce Wayne, who is revealed to have survived and been transported back in time by the Omega Beams. Bruce picks up where Anthro left off, drawing a bat symbol on the cave wall.

== Format ==
The first issue of Final Crisis went on sale May 28, 2008. Final Crisis was seven oversized issues released over nine months starting in May 2008. Morrison explained that the sequence of stories in the main series and tie-ins is Final Crisis #1–3, Superman Beyond #1–2, Final Crisis: Submit, Final Crisis #4–5, Batman #682–683, and finally Final Crisis #6–7.

=== Tie-ins ===
Several one-shots and mini-series were released as tie-ins to Final Crisis; three series ran in parallel to the main one and the one-shot, DC Universe: Last Will and Testament, was planned to fit in the "break" between Final Crisis #3 and #4.

Morrison, who wrote one of the "final" Batman stories in "Batman R.I.P.," stated, "First it's R.I.P., and we'll see how that winds up for Batman. Then the two-parter mentioned (Batman #682–683) goes through Batman's whole career, in a big summing up of everything that also ties directly into Final Crisis. And Final Crisis is where we see the final fate of Batman."

While not an official tie-in, the Terror Titans mini-series takes place during the events of Final Crisis and deals with the Dark Side Club and the Anti-Life Equation.

- Batman #682–683, #701–702
- DC Universe #0
- DC Universe: Last Will and Testament
- Final Crisis: Legion of Three Worlds #1–5
- Final Crisis: Rage of the Red Lanterns (one-shot)
- Final Crisis: Requiem (one-shot)
- Final Crisis: Resist (one-shot)
- Final Crisis: Revelations #1–5
- Final Crisis: Rogues' Revenge #1–3
- Final Crisis: Secret Files (one-shot)
- Final Crisis: Sketchbook (one-shot)
- Final Crisis: Submit (one-shot)
- Final Crisis: Superman Beyond #1–2
- Justice League of America (vol. 2) #21, 27
- Superman/Batman #76
- Superman #670
- Action Comics #866
- Superman: New Krypton Special #1
- Reign in Hell #4
- Birds of Prey #118
- The Flash #240
- Infinity, Inc. #11–12
- Teen Titans #59–60
- Terror Titans #1–6

== Aftermath ==
In a move Dan DiDio described as "inspirationally tied to Final Crisis," in early 2009, the villains took over the main DC Universe titles and some were featured in "Faces of Evil," a series of one-shots, all designed to examine the question "What happens when evil wins?"

Four Final Crisis Aftermath six-issue limited series were announced at New York Comic Con 2009:

- Final Crisis Aftermath: Run! #1–6 featuring the Human Flame, written by Lilah Sturges, with art by Freddie Williams
- Final Crisis Aftermath: Dance #1–6 featuring the Super Young Team, written by Joe Casey, with art by ChrisCross
- Final Crisis Aftermath: Escape #1–6 featuring Nemesis, written by Ivan Brandon, with art by Marco Rudy
- Final Crisis Aftermath: Ink #1–6 featuring the Tattooed Man, written by Eric Wallace, with art by Fabrizio Fiorentino
- The Flash: Rebirth #1–6, written by Geoff Johns with art from Ethan Van Sciver, addresses Barry Allen's return in Final Crisis.
- Battle for the Cowl #1–3, written and drawn by Tony Daniel deals with the aftermath of the apparent death of Batman and the selection of his successor.
- When Worlds Collide, a storyline serialized in the Justice League of America #27–28 and 30–34 and written by Dwayne McDuffie with art from Ed Benes, Rags Morales, and Eddy Barrows, deals with the arrival of the Milestone Media characters on New Earth as a result of Final Crisis.
- The Red Circle event written by J. Michael Straczynski deals with the characters of Red Circle Comics, who arrived on New Earth following Final Crisis. One-shots were released for The Hangman, The Inferno, The Shield, and The Web.
- Milestone Forever #1–2, a prestige format limited series written by Dwayne McDuffie with art from Denys Cowan, John Paul Leon, ChrisCross, and M.D. Bright, goes into greater detail about the merger of the Milestone and DC Universes after Final Crisis.
- Blackest Knight, the third story arc in Grant Morrison's Batman and Robin #7–9, deals with the revelation of the truth regarding the supposed "body" of Bruce Wayne left behind at the conclusion of Final Crisis #6.
- Batman: The Return of Bruce Wayne #1–6 deals with Bruce Wayne making his way back to the present after being sent to the distant past by Darkseid's Omega Sanction.
- Multiversity: Mastermen #1 is an indirect sequel. However, Overman, one of the Nazi alternative versions of Superman resident on Earth-10 is still mourning the death of his "cousin" Overgirl, one of the Nazi alternative versions of Supergirl, killed while trying to cross the Bleed between alternate universes of the DC Multiverse, in 2015

== Connections to previous titles ==
In the 1997–1998 JLA story arc "Rock of Ages" a future where Darkseid had enslaved the human race using the Anti-Life Equation was shown. This story arc resembles some similarities to events shown in Final Crisis and was also written by Grant Morrison.

== Collected editions ==
Title	Material collected	Published date	ISBN
Final Crisis	Final Crisis #1–7, Final Crisis: Superman Beyond #1–2, Final Crisis: Submit #1	June 2009	978-1401222819
Final Crisis (New Edition)	Final Crisis #1-7, Final Crisis: Submit #1, Final Crisis: Superman Beyond #1-2, DC Universe Zero, Batman #682-683	April 2014	978-1401245177
Absolute Final Crisis	Final Crisis #1-7, Final Crisis: Submit #1, Final Crisis: Superman Beyond #1-2, Final Crisis Sketchbook, Final Crisis #1: Director's Cut, Batman #682-683	November 2012	978-1401235116
Final Crisis Companion	Final Crisis #1: Director's Cut, Final Crisis: Requiem #1, Final Crisis: Resist #1, Final Crisis: Secret Files #1	June 2009	978-1401222741
Final Crisis: Legion of Three Worlds	Final Crisis: Legion of 3 Worlds #1–5	October 2009	978-1401223243
Final Crisis: Revelations	Final Crisis: Revelations #1–5	August 2009	978-1848563513
Final Crisis: Rogues' Revenge	Final Crisis: Rogues' Revenge #1–3, The Flash (vol. 2) #182 and 197	July 2009	978-1401223335
Green Lantern: Rage of the Red Lanterns	Final Crisis: Rage of the Red Lanterns #1 and Green Lantern #26–28, 36–38	July 2009	978-1401223014
Final Crisis Aftermath: Dance	Final Crisis Aftermath: Dance #1–6	February 2010	978-1848565456
Final Crisis Aftermath: Escape	Final Crisis Aftermath: Escape #1–6	March 2010	978-1401226084
Final Crisis Aftermath: Ink	Final Crisis Aftermath: Ink #1–6	March 2010	978-1848565470
Final Crisis Aftermath: Run	Final Crisis Aftermath: Run #1–6	March 2010	978-1848566354
Final Crisis Omnibus	Batman #676-683, 701-702, Birds of Prey #118, DC Universe #0, DC Universe: The Last Will and Testament #1, Final Crisis #1-7, Final Crisis: Legion of 3 Worlds #1-5, Final Crisis: Requiem #1, Final Crisis: Resist #1, Final Crisis: Revelations #1-5, Final Crisis: Rogues' Revenge #1-3, Final Crisis: Secret Files #1, Final Crisis: Submit #1, Final Crisis: Superman Beyond #1-2, Flash #240-241, Justice League of America #21, Superman/Batman #76, Teen Titans #59-60, Terror Titans #1-6	October 2018	978-1401285036

== In other media ==
Elements of "Final Crisis" were incorporated into the 2020 animated film Justice League Dark: Apokolips War.
