= Super Young Team =

Characters in the DC comics universe

Publication information
- Publisher: DC Comics
- First appearance: Final Crisis Sketchbook #1 (May 2008)
- Created by: Grant Morrison (writer); J. G. Jones (artist)

In-story information
- Base(s): Japan
- Member(s): Most Excellent Superbat; Big Atomic Lantern Boy; Crazy Shy Lolita Canary; Shiny Happy Aquazon; Well-Spoken Sonic Lightning Flash

The Super Young Team is a Japanese superhero team in the DC Comics Universe. The team first appears in Final Crisis Sketchbook #1 (May 2008), and was created by Grant Morrison and J. G. Jones.

== Publication history ==
The concept for the team emerged from the same pitch Grant Morrison made that contained the idea for the Great Ten, and they were first mentioned in 52 #6. They are influenced by American superheroes and Japanese pop culture.

The characters first appeared in Morrison's Final Crisis, where they were revealed to be the Fifth World incarnations of the Forever People. They are featured in Final Crisis Aftermath: Dance, written by Joe Casey with art by ChrisCross. In that six-part series, their fame overwhelms them, causing judgement errors and loss of self-control.

== Membership ==
=== Most Excellent Superbat ===
Most Excellent Superbat (Heino) is the team leader. He wears a wildly stylized red and yellow uniform influenced by both Superman and Batman. According to him, his power is "being so rich he can do anything". Most Excellent Superbat uses an array of gadgets, one of which can generate an energy-based exoskeleton. His secret island base is called the "Most Serene Sanctuary" and contains a supercomputer he calls a "unified data field" which is only accessible when he meditates into a calm theta rhythm state. By the end of the series, he revealed that he is indeed as rich as he claims when he actually buys Japan.

=== Big Atomic Lantern Boy ===
Big Atomic Lantern Boy is Most Excellent Superbat's second in command. He wears a green outfit which is outfitted with a circular porthole on his chest. The porthole displays his skeleton, and allows him to fire radioactive beams. He is attracted to Shiny Happy Aquazon.

=== Crazy Shy Lolita Canary ===
Crazy Shy Lolita Canary is a winged heroine in a Japanese schoolgirl uniform, and is physically small enough to fit in someone's hand. She possesses a sonic scream similar to that of Black Canary, which appears to be a modulated mixture of multiple voices.

=== Shiny Happy Aquazon ===
Shiny Happy Aquazon is the daughter of Junior Waveman (Riki Kimura) - a founding member of Big Science Action - and Senior Waveman Otomo. She has the ability to create hard water constructs. She is attracted to Sonic Lightning Flash. In Final Crisis Aftermath: Dance #4, her father who is now Senior Waveman Kimura invites her to join Big Science Action.

=== Well-Spoken Sonic Lightning Flash ===
Well-Spoken Sonic Lightning Flash is a young speedster whose real name is Keigo, with a round helmet and giant athletic shoes. He is capable of running up to 500 mph.

=== Sunny Sumo ===
Sunny Sumo is a wrestler with self-healing abilities and the potential to resist mind control who is a refugee from the destroyed Earth-51. The original Sumo, Sonny Sumo, had assisted the Forever People in their original series before being stranded in ancient Japan.

== Equipment ==
The Super Young Team has a vehicle called the Wonder Wagon, which is a car capable of powered flight, similar to the Newsboy Legion's Whiz Wagon.
