= Mister Miracle (Shilo Norman) =

- Cover to Seven Soldiers: Mister Miracle #1; Art by Pasqual Ferry.

Publication information
- Publisher: DC Comics
- First appearance: Mister Miracle #15 (August 1973)
- Created by: Jack Kirby

In-story information
- Alter ego: Shilo Norman
- Team affiliations: Seven Soldiers; New Gods
- Abilities: Master escapologist; Advanced hand-to-hand combatant; Genius-level intellect; Proficient scientist and inventor; Expert athlete and acrobat; Carries a Mother Box and advanced gadgets

Shilo Norman is a superhero in the DC Comics universe. He is the third person to use the name Mister Miracle. Created by Jack Kirby, he first appeared in Mister Miracle #15 (August 1973).

== Fictional character biography ==
=== Biography ===
Shilo Norman's mother abandoned him as an infant. He spent the early parts of his youth in an orphanage in Metropolis. Shilo was unsatisfied with his lot in life, so he fled the abuses of the orphanage and began living on the streets. Shilo became the informal ward of escapologist Thaddeus Brown (Mister Miracle), and also served as an occasional stand-in. After Brown is murdered by the mobster Steel Hand, his protege Scott Free avenges his new friend's death by taking on the identity of Mister Miracle and bringing Steel Hand to justice.

Shilo reunites with his brother Aaron, only to watch him be murdered by a gang member. Metropolis policeman Solomon Driver leaves Shilo Norman in the protective custody of Scott Free.

Shilo escapes to take revenge for his brother's death on his own, but Scott and Big Barda convince him otherwise. Scott decided to train Shilo in his own special escape artistry techniques and gave him advanced New Genesis technology.

As an adult, Shilo becomes the security chief of the Slab, metahuman prison. For his heroic actions during the "Last Laugh" storyline, Shilo becomes the warden of the Slab, which is relocated to Antarctica.

=== Celebrity ===
Shilo becomes a successful and well-paid escape artist, using the name Mister Miracle for himself. He becomes famous for large scale televised stunts, including well-publicized escapes from the second dimension, the center of the Earth, and a miniature black hole. Within the black hole, Shilo has a vision of a familiar but different life, spanning years. In his vision, he still possessed a Mother Box, but had no memory of the New Gods. Darkseid subjects Shilo to the "Omega Sanction", in which he lived a series of oppressive lives before escaping.

Shilo heads to the Dark Side Club to free Aurakles and break the Sheeda's contract with Darkseid. In exchange, he sacrifices his life, and at the end of the issue his second resurrection is shown—escaping literally from the grave, apparently thanks to his absorption of Mother Box's consciousness and abilities.

=== Final Crisis ===
In Final Crisis, Shilo is seen talking to Sonny Sumo, telling him of a "cosmic war", that "the powers of evil won", and that Motherboxxx is "the only thing left". Shilo leads a team of rookie Japanese heroes in a desperate bid against Darkseid's growing power on Earth, but is unsuccessful.

=== Brightest Day ===
During the events of Brightest Day, Alan Scott is driven insane by his Starheart power and creates a fortress on the moon with the intent of using it as a base while he begins his plan to destroy the world. After Miss Martian uses her powers to get a mental layout of a holding cell inside the fortress, it is made clear to the heroes that the fortress must contain Fourth World technology. Shilo appears at the end of Justice Society of America (vol. 3) #41, where he is recruited by the Justice League to help a small team composed of Batman, Jade, Mister America, Hourman, Donna Troy, and Jesse Quick infiltrate the fortress and get past its advanced defenses.

Shilo successfully leads the team about halfway through the fortress, only to be attacked by apparitions created by the Starheart. Jesse and Jade are able to pull Shilo away from the beasts before he is killed, but his wounds are severe enough that the Mother Box is forced to heal him.

== Powers and abilities ==
Shilo Norman has no superhuman powers; he is an athlete with acrobatic and gymnastic skills. In his youth, Shilo was trained by Thaddeus Brown in all techniques of the escape arts. Shilo Norman became a qualified escape artist and was later trained by Scott Free himself. Shilo discovered his passion for escaping early and tried a number of times to escape different scenarios even as a child. Shilo shows his proficiency by becoming a world-renowned escape artist.

Shilo also was trained by Scott Free and Big Barda in various fighting techniques and martial arts. Shilo has demonstrated to be a skilled fighter with amazing reflexes.

Later, as a student at New York University, Shilo studied a wide variety of subjects, and in his spare time he performed sleight of hand and small feats of street magic for the crowds in Washington Square Park. He developed an annoying habit of talking in non sequiturs, which he attributes to too many comparative philosophy classes. He was apparently studying for a degree in physics, and had taken several other modern science courses. He met and began to date Fiona Leeway. During this time, he experimented with the "hero gig" as a third generation Mister Miracle, standing in for Scott as a member of Justice League International using New Genesis technology that he had either modified or built himself, such as his Enerjams and Zoom Pads.

=== Equipment ===
- Enerjams - Shilo's most distinctive invention, enerjams are mounds of pure energy produced from his gloves which can emit heat and magnetic fields that help him grip onto walls.
- Mother Box - None of Shilo's new devices would work without the symbiotic power of Mother Box, a living computer he received from Scott Free. Shilo adapted his Mother Box.
- Multi-Cube - Shilo has his own version of Scott's multi-cube, a 1" square that acts as computer and communicator, emitting both regular and ultraviolet light, sonic vibrations, and holograms.
- Sticky Boots - Shilo's boots contain "thermal inductors" and magnetic grips.
- Uniform - Incorporated within the hood of his JLI-era uniform were synapse-sensing devices that allowed much of the circuitry in his costume to react at the speed of thought. To track criminals, he carried tiny mini-transmitters with a morphogenetic gamma field detector equipped with an EM filter circuit to dampen electromagnetic interference.
- Zoom Pads - A redesigned version of Mister Miracle's Aero-Discs.
