= List of Stargirl characters =

DC's Stargirl, or simply Stargirl, is an American superhero television series created by Geoff Johns that premiered on streaming service DC Universe. It is based on the DC Comics superhero Courtney Whitmore created by Johns and Lee Moder. The series follows high school student Courtney Whitmore who discovers the cosmic staff and becomes the inspiration for a new generation of superheroes who become the Justice Society of America.

This page lists the characters that appear in this show.

== Overview ==
Legend
= Main cast (credited)
= Recurring cast (4+)
= Guest cast (1–3)

Character	Portrayed by	Seasons		
Character	Portrayed by	1	2	3
Courtney Whitmore / Stargirl	Brec Bassinger	Main	Main	Main
Yolanda Montez / Wildcat II	Yvette Monreal	Main	Main	Main
Beth Chapel / Doctor Mid-Nite II	Anjelika Washington	Main	Main	Main
Rick Tyler / Hourman II	Cameron Gellman	Main	Main	Main
Mike Dugan	Trae Romano	Main	Main	Main
Henry King Jr.	Jake Austin Walker	Main	(Note: Eclipso uses an illusion of Henry King Jr. to torment Yolanda.)	
Cindy Burman / Shiv	Meg DeLacy	Main	Main	Main
Jordan Mahkent / Icicle	Neil Jackson	Main	(Note: Eclipso uses an illusion of Icicle on Barbara where he claimed that the snowstorm has enabled him to be reborn. Shade helped Barbara break this illusion.)	Recurring
Henry King Sr. / Brainwave	Christopher James Baker	Main	(Note: Eclipso uses an illusion of Brainwave to torment Yolanda.)	
Barbara Whitmore	Amy Smart	Main	Main	Main
Pat Dugan / S.T.R.I.P.E.	Luke Wilson	Main	Main	Main
Cameron Mahkent	Hunter Sansone	Main	Main	Main
Eclipso	Nick Tarabay	(Note: Eclipso cameos in "Stars & S.T.R.I.P.E. Part Two", voiced by an uncredited actor.)	Main	
Lawrence "Crusher" Crock / Sportsmaster	Neil Hopkins	Recurring	Guest	Main
Paula Brooks / Tigress	Joy Osmanski	Recurring	Guest	Main
Sylvester Pemberton / Starman and Gerard Shugel / Ultra-Humanite	Joel McHale	Guest	Recurring	Main (Note: McHale is listed among the main cast but credited in the opening titles as special appearance.)
Jakeem Williams / Jakeem Thunder	Alkoya Brunson		Guest	Main

== Main characters ==
=== Courtney Whitmore / Stargirl ===
Courtney Elizabeth Whitmore (portrayed by Brec Bassinger; Maizie Smith as a child) is a high school student from Los Angeles who finds a powerful weapon, the Cosmic Staff and becomes the superheroine Stargirl. As Stargirl, she also becomes the leader of the second incarnation of the Justice Society of America (JSA).

Courtney was born and raised in Valley Village, California, to a single working mother, Barbara Whitmore. Barbara had an ongoing relationship with Sam Kurtis, though he was constantly in and out of their lives from the time Courtney was born. Courtney herself only met Sam a handful of times, but still cared deeply for him. When she was four, Sam Kurtis gifted her one of the lockets his mother had given him. He placed a photo of himself in the locket so Courtney would also have him with her. They spent Christmas together in a slew of fun and childlike games. She cherished the locket and wore it well into her teen years.

A year later on Christmas Eve 2010, Sam was scheduled to meet a now five-year-old Courtney to celebrate the holidays, but he never arrived and vanished that night and the Whitmores never saw or heard from him again. A distraught Courtney waited for Sam all night with a special gift for him. Barbara dedicated nearly two years looking for Sam for the sake of their daughter, but eventually gave up. Courtney persevered and became a gymnast, began practicing martial arts where she learned incredible fighting skills, and reached at least a blue belt. She was also very advanced in her gymnast career, being the best on her team at Sherman High. She had a strong circle of friends in California.

In 2020, a now fifteen-year-old Courtney packs her room in California to travel across the country with her new step-father, Pat Dugan, and stepbrother Mike Dugan, to Blue Valley, Nebraska, where her mother has secured a new job. The move is against Courtney's wishes but she does her best to try and get along with Pat for her mother's sake.

Her first day at Blue Valley High is met with obstacles as she makes an enemy of mean girl Cindy Burman and is ostracized to the loser table by Paula Brooks, forced to sit with the talkative Beth Chapel, social outcast Yolanda Montez, and delinquent Rick Harris. After standing up for Yolanda against a cruel jock named Henry King Jr. who she shoved into a passing lunch lady, Courtney is dragged away by Principal Anaya Bowin who also scolds Cindy for using a profanity on Courtney in her presence. She returns to her new house where Mike has plans with his friends while she is having trouble fitting in. Her annoyance over the day and Pat trying to bond with her causes her to snap that he is not her father. She runs to the basement where her anger turns to curiosity when she finds boxes of superhero paraphernalia in Pat's things. She learns from a series of photographs that Pat was a hero named Stripesey, the famed Starman's sidekick, and a member of the JSA. She also finds a magical staff that glows in her presence. When she picks it up, the staff whirs to life and displays its larger-than-life attributes. The staff has a mind of its own and takes her on a nightly adventure, where she learns that the staff grants her powers such as flight, cosmic blasts, and allows her to perform gymnastics feats. The staff brings her to a drive-in where she once again encounters Henry Jr, this time he is heckling other movie watchers. To teach him a lesson she attempts to poke holes in his tires but the staff, wanting more, shoots a cosmic blast at the car causing it to blow up. She engages in a fight with Henry and barely wins before flying back to her home. She is confronted by a worried Pat who tells her about his life as a sidekick, and that his best friend Starman, Sylvester Pemberton, was murdered during a fight. He explains that the staff only ever worked for Starman, prompting Courtney to see a resemblance between her father and Starman. Now believing that she is Starman's daughter and that this is her destiny, she convinces Pat to help her be a hero.

Things take a turn for Courtney when the staff takes her on a bonding exercise that results in an unpleasant meeting with Brainwave. She is rescued by Pat, who operates a massive robot called S.T.R.I.P.E. He once again warns her of the dangers of being a hero and how Brainwave was responsible for the deaths of many Justice Society members, though it was Icicle who ultimately killed Starman. She learns about surviving member Rex Tyler, who operated as Hourman, and how Rex was murdered a few years after the Justice Society were defeated. Pat stresses the importance of keeping her identity a secret to protect her loved ones. She decides to steal Starman's old suit and turns it into a suit fit for herself.

Ten years after the series events, Courtney begins operating as Starwoman.

=== Yolanda Montez / Wildcat ===
Yolanda Montez (portrayed by Yvette Monreal) is a once popular student at Blue Valley High until a scandal made her an outcast and a disgrace to her Catholic parents. A skilled boxer, she becomes one of Courtney's friends and a member of the new Justice Society as Wildcat.

Yolanda Montez was born and raised in Blue Valley, Nebraska, to a conservative and religious family. Yolanda attended Blue Valley High School, where she was popular and attentive with big dreams. She had attended church with her family and was voted most outgoing at BVHS alongside her football-playing boyfriend, Henry King Jr.. In 2019, she ran for class president and was supported by her doting parents, grandmother and younger cousin. She had been in a relationship with Henry King Jr. for quite sometime and believed they were serious. Her classmate and presidential rival, Cindy Burman was jealous of Yolanda's relationship with Henry.

One night, Henry asked Yolanda to send him revealing photos of herself. She was initially hesitant but eventually did send him a topless photo. The next day, Henry showed off the images to his friends while Yolanda discussed things with principal Bowin. Cindy grabbed Henry's phone long enough to see the messages, though he quickly grabbed it back. At the school assembly, Cindy sent the pictures of Yolanda to the entire student body and faculty. Yolanda was publicly humiliated. Her relationship with Henry fell apart and her so-called religious parents started to treat Yolanda quite badly for no clear reason at all. She was grounded, until Maria and Juan said otherwise, and her phone privileges taken away. They stopped bringing her to church and delusion claim that Yolanda had disgraced the Montez family's so-called name. At school, she was dubbed the school slut.

In the first season, Yolanda, Rick Tyler and Beth Chapel are suddenly joined by Courtney Whitmore at lunch. Courtney introduces herself and Beth warmly responds while Yolanda continues to ignore Courtney's presence. When Courtney tries to converse with the group Yolanda stays silent along with everyone else. Beth informs Courtney that the people at the table are not friends and are losers. Yolanda merely looks up at Beth and barely reacts when Rick sulks out of the cafeteria. The trio is soon joined by Henry King Jr. and two of his football friends. Two boys lean on the table to Yolanda's left, while Henry leans close to Yolanda's right. She leans away from Henry, visibly uncomfortable. Henry tauntingly asks her if she has any new pictures of herself that she would like to share with them. Courtney tells him to leave Yolanda alone, much to Yolanda's surprise. Yolanda incredulously witnesses a struggle between Courtney and Henry that results in principal Bowen dragging Courtney away to deal with her.

Montez later takes up Grant's former costumed identity of Wildcat, at the request of Stargirl, to help rebuild the JSA. After forgiving Henry before he was killed by his father Brainwave, Montez would later avenge him by killing the latter.

Ten years later, Yolanda is still in the JSA.

=== Beth Chapel / Doctor Mid-Nite ===
Beth Chapel (portrayed by Anjelika Washington) is a social reject and nerd who becomes one of Courtney's friends and a member of the new JSA as the new Doctor Mid-Nite.

Beth was born on May 15, 2004, in Omaha General Hospital to Bridget and James Chapel. She primarily grew up in Blue Valley, Nebraska, and was very close to her parents. Beth grew up and eventually attended Blue Valley High, which is when her parents expressed a desire to return to their lives. This proved difficult for Beth, so she threw herself into schoolwork and created the BVHS teachers appreciation club, though she is the only member. She quickly became an outcast despite her talkative and outgoing personality, but often participated in school events despite being relatively friendless.

In the first season, Beth, Rick Tyler and Beth Chapel are suddenly joined by Courtney Whitmore at lunch. Courtney introduces herself and Beth warmly responds. When Courtney tries to converse with the group Beth stays silent along with everyone else. Beth tells her that the people at the table are not friends with each other or anyone else and they're basically the Loser Table. She hardly reacts to Rick abruptly leaving or Henry King's aggressive behavior with Yolanda and the incident that followed. The next day, Beth video conferences with her mom at lunch and cues in her father. She excitedly gets her father to join the "family lunch", only to be informed by him that he's busy. Bridget's colleague, Dr. Henry King Sr., stops by and waves hi to Beth, taking a seat at his desk behind Dr. Chapel. She asks her daughter who the girl sitting next to her, and Beth introduces Courtney to her. Beth tells Bridget she'll see Courtney at the open house, and their video call ends. Beth tells Courtney her parents were the best and Courtney gives her an awkward smile. At the open house that night, Beth excitedly tells her parents about her teachers and is seen socializing alongside her parents.

She later obtains the Charles McNider's goggles, befriends its A.I. which she nicknames "Chuck", becomes the new Doctor Mid-Nite, and joins Stargirl's JSA.

In season two, Chapel finds out that her parents are getting a divorce as she tries to reactivate "Chuck", only to come in contact with McNider, who is trapped in the Shadowlands. After falling victim to Eclipso's illusions, McNider advises her to keep the googles as they can see through Eclipo's tricks. Once McNider is freed, he helps Beth find Eclipso while breaking her parents out of the villain's illusions. Following Eclipso's defeat, Chapel's parents and McNider support her in being the new Doctor Mid-Nite before Chapel helps McNider discover what happened to his family.

Ten years later, Beth is still a member of the JSA. Shade mentions that she is set to marry Rick.

=== Rick Tyler / Hourman ===
Richard "Rick" Tyler (portrayed by Cameron Gellman; Boston Pierce as a child) is a high school delinquent with anger issues and the son of the original Hourman whose parents were killed in a staged car accident when he was seven. He becomes one of Courtney's friends and a member of the new JSA as the new Hourman.

Nine years ago, Rex Tyler and his wife, Wendi, lived in West Farms, Blue Valley, Nebraska, with their son, Rick. Rex had been tracking the Injustice Society for a long time and had been onto something. One night, in a frenzy, Rex recorded down a burst of discovered information. He and Wendi quickly packed their bags into their car and planned to flee Blue Valley, much to the confusion of Rick. Wendi's brother, Matt Harris, arrived confused as to why he had been called to Blue Valley. Rex quickly explained that inside was the deed to the house, which they left to Matt, and records pertaining to Rick. On the certificates, Matt was listed as Rick's biological father and having the last name Harris instead of Tyler. Though Matt was hesitant, Rex told him about the $50,000 he left in the house for the pair. While they hoped to not be gone long, he wanted to have a backup plan just in case. Rex and Wendi tearfully said goodbye to their son. Rex gave Rick a 1966 yellow mustang keychain and told him to hold onto it while he was away. He alluded that it was more important than Rick knew. Rick's parents then entered their car and sped away while Rick yelled after them, begging his parents not to leave him. Rex and Wendi died in a car "accident" that night, and Rick fell into the custody of Matt.

Rick became a troubled kid at Blue Valley who was in and out of trouble be it at school or around town. His relationship with Matt was tumultuous and abusive, due to Matt's quick temper and bitterness over being left in charge of a kid he never wanted. Rick felt this neglect and, upon entering high school, became a delinquent. He often sat at a loser table where he kept to himself, stole school property, and frequently received detention. He also drank alcohol when he was not attending classes. In his free time, Rick worked to repair his father's mustang.

Rick learns Solomon Grundy killed his parents and his father was the hero Hourman. Seeking vengeance for his parents, Rick takes up his father's mantle and amulet and joins Stargirl's Justice Society. In addition, Pat Dugan gives him Rex's journal to decipher so they can foil the Injustice Society's plans. Rick finally confronts and defeats Grundy, but spares Grundy's life and lets him go.

In season two, Rick discovers Grundy lurking in the nearby forest and breaking into restaurants for food. Sympathizing with him, Rick leaves food for Grundy, but Eclipso causes Rick to hallucinate Grundy killing a little girl before manipulating the former into attacking Matt and breaking the hourglass amulet, leading to Rick being arrested. While in prison, Rick attempts to use his father's journal to rebuild the amulet. He is later released from prison after Pat tortures Matt into dropping the charges and helps the JSA in the final battle against Eclipso.

Ten years later, Rick is still a member of the JSA. Shade states that he is set to marry Beth Chapel.

=== Mike Dugan ===
Mike Dugan (portrayed by Trae Romano) is Pat Dugan's son and Courtney's stepbrother.

Mike lived with his single father, Pat Dugan, in California with their dog. They moved around a lot when Mike was younger, but seemingly settled in California after Pat met Barbara Whitmore. When Pat and Barbara married, Mike gained a stepmother and new stepsister, Courtney. The blended family moved from California to Blue Valley, Nebraska. While he was not thrilled about the idea of moving to a nowhere town, he quickly adjusted to the small-town lifestyle but throwing himself into gaming.

In the first season, Pat Dugan arrives at the former house of the Whitmore's, his son Mike in the passenger seat and their dog Max in the backseat. Mike voices his disapproval about moving to a rural location that does not have several popular California food locations. Pat begs his son to stay positive, only to get a snarky reply that he's positive it'll blow ass. Mike tells his father he thought they were gonna stop moving around when he hooked up with Barbara, a term Pat rejects. Mike tries to pitch other ways of saying hooked up, but Pat ignores his son's snarkiness.

In season two, Cindy uses Mike as bait for the JSA to encounter the Injustice Unlimited. After a brief ownership of Thunderbolt's pen, he later finds that his friend Jakeem owns it.

Ten years later, Shade mentioned that Mike joined the JSA as the second S.T.R.I.P.E.

=== Henry King Jr. ===
Henry King Jr. (portrayed by Jake Austin Walker) is a student at Blue Valley High as well as its star football player.

Henry King Jr. was born to Dr. Henry King Sr. and Merry King in 2004. He is the nephew of Merri's brother Sylvester Pemberton. The day after his sixth birthday, Merri was supposed to pick Henry up from school but never showed. Henry was scared that his mother had forgotten about him. A few hours later, his father picked him up and told him that there had been an accident. His mother had fallen into the pool and drowned, and by the time Dr. King found her, she was ice cold. The remaining King's moved to Blue Valley soon after Merri's death.

Three months ago, Henry had a relationship with Yolanda Montez and she believed they were serious. He was supportive of her campaign for student president and they enjoyed their time together. One night, he asked her to send him revealing pictures of herself and she obliged. The next day, he showed his friends the images in the halls of BVHS. His phone was taken by Cindy Burman, but he managed to retrieve it. At the assembly, Yolanda's pictures were leaked by Cindy which led to a breakup between Henry and Yolanda. He then began dating Cindy, which was orchestrated by Dr. King and Cindy's father, Dr. Ito.

In the first season, after his father is hospitalized, Henry Jr. begins to visit him while he recuperates, during which Henry Jr.'s psychic powers begin to develop before fully manifesting after Cindy challenges Stargirl. After researching his powers and his father's work, Henry Jr. slowly begins to share his father's views on humanity. Shortly after Stargirl tries to convince him otherwise in her civilian identity, Henry Jr. commits his first murder when he kills his father's lawyer for trying to have him taken off life support. After discovering Henry Sr. killed his mother to ensure his loyalty to the Injustice Society, Henry Jr. chooses to fight him and gives his life to save Stargirl's Justice Society while encouraging her to keep fighting and making peace with Yolanda.

=== Cindy Burman / Shiv ===
Cynthia "Cindy" Burman (portrayed by Meg DeLacy) is the daughter of Dragon King, girlfriend of Henry King Jr. and the most popular student at Blue Valley High with enhanced abilities and wields wrist blades from her skin. While she is the school's cheerleading captain, she is determined to follow in her father's footsteps. In pursuit of this, she acquired a powerful suit of armor and a flame-throwing staff.

Cindy was born to Dr. Shiro Ito and his first wife, Suzanne Ito in Blue Valley, Nebraska. Shiro sought to conduct experiments on Cindy that would change her physically and emotionally. To avoid further trauma, Suzanne took Cindy and fled Blue Valley. They eventually settled in Farmersville, California. A fearful Cindy worried that her father would find her, though Suzanne assured her they were safe. That night, Dragon King returned and took Cindy and Suzanne back to Blue Valley where he began his experiments. He started by placing shivs in her wrists that allowed her to do irreparable harm to those around her. She grew up studying chemistry and became very advanced physically, mentally, and in her education.

When she was in the third grade, Cindy lost control of her powers and accidentally murdered Suzanne. She was devastated by the loss which Dragon King also blamed her for. On her first day in the fourth grade, Cindy addressed her class over the death of her mother and merely stated that she did not like her mother anyway. After this, her father sought a new caretaker for Cindy but the first woman did not work out for unknown reasons. He then kidnapped Bobbie Burman and made her into Cindy's caretaker and public stepmother. Following the death of her mother, Cindy's personality became vicious and cunning.

In season two, Cindy works with Eclipso to create their own Injustice Society called Injustice Unlimited. While fighting Stargirl's JSA and Shade, Stargirl accidentally breaks the gem, freeing Eclipso. He uses a shard of it to send Cindy to the Shadowlands despite Stargirl's best efforts to save her, though Shade eventually uses his powers to rescue her. Following this, Cindy forms a truce with Courtney, admits to Yolanda that she was the one who leaked the photo, and calls Artemis Crock and her family to help defeat Eclipso. Following the fight, Cindy confronts Yolanda wanting to make amends and mentions her interest to join the JSA.

In season three, Cindy works on a positive approach on her life as she helps an old lady with her groceries and has re-enrolled in Blue Valley High School. It is revealed that Cindy is developing reptilian abilities due to the effect of her father's experiments on her throughout her childhood, which includes scales growing on her arms. Ten years later, Cindy is stated to have joined the JSA as Dragon Queen.

=== Jordan Mahkent / Icicle ===
Jordan Mahkent (portrayed by Neil Jackson) is the leader of the Injustice Society of America (ISA) and an "astute" businessman with the power of cryokinesis, the ability to manipulate ice. He is the founder of The American Dream, a firm that is responsible for the revitalization of Blue Valley.

Jordan was in London when he first met Christine, a talented artist, who caught his attention because of her beauty. He was nervous to ask her out as another man was pursuing her, whom he implied to have killed to be her only suitor. When Jordan finally grew the courage to speak with Christine, she showed him the most beautiful drawings of him. She had liked him too but was just waiting for him to make a move. They later married and had a son together, Cameron. At some point, Jordan founded The American Dream to rebuild America one town at a time.

During an unknown time, Jordan founded the ISA and collected various individuals with an array of talents or gifts like Brainwave, Fiddler, Gambler, Shade, Solomon Grundy, Sportsmaster, Tigress, and Wizard. His collection of supervillains was doubted by reluctant allies, and he was ultimately betrayed by one of his members. Jordan, under his moniker of Icicle, made fast enemies with the JSA, a team of superheroes who sought to protect the world. As Icicle, he fought individual members of their team several times over the years before the culmination of their feud on December 24, 2010. The battle resulted in the destruction of the JSA where he somehow took down Flash, froze Sandman, and sent an icicle into Sylvester Pemberton. Jordan moved his family and team to Blue Valley, Nebraska to further pursue his dream of Project New America.

Christine worked as a school teacher at a newly built school. Unbeknownst to anyone beforehand, Bannerman Chemicals built the school Christine worked at on top of a former chemical waste dump. The chemicals Christine was exposed to everyday caused her to develop cancer. In 2012, Christine laid in Jordan's bed at home, dying. Jordan brought their eight-year-old son Cameron to see his mother, so could have a chance to say goodbye. She died that night only moments after she made Jordan promise to do whatever it took to complete his mission, even if he had to kill anyone who obstructed him. After Christine's death, Jordan was overcome with emotion and ran outside where he let out an emotional scream. He temporarily lost control of his powers and froze the entire garden while his son watched from inside the house.

Jordan left Blue Valley and temporarily resigned his leadership of the Injustice Society to William Zarick. His son, Cameron, was primarily raised by Jordan's parents Sofus and Lily. Jordan traveled around the country searching for the people responsible for his wife becoming ill. He also observed the state of the country and took notes on how broken the country is and the forgotten small towns.

After returning to Blue Valley, Icicle engages Stargirl and S.T.R.I.P.E. in battle, which leads to the murder of Injustice Society member Wizard's son Joey. When Wizard confronts him about what happened, Icicle freezes him with his parents covering up his death by stating that he had a heart attack. When meeting with Dragon King, Icicle allowed him to have Wizard's body for one of his experiments. Icicle then meets with the Injustice Society to determine how to handle Stargirl after she starts rebuilding the JSA. During the final battle, Icicle leads the Injustice Society in enacting "Project: New America", but Stargirl's JSA foil their plans. After sustaining damage while fighting her and S.T.R.I.P.E., Icicle is shattered by Mike Dugan using his dad's truck.

Icicle secretly revived himself in a liquid form before eventually reconstituting himself in the following year, though he is forced to constantly focus to maintain his physical form, and is revealed to be the one who was spying on everyone. After forming an alliance with the Ultra-Humanite and Dragon King, and reviving Sylvester for his own uses nine months earlier, he kills Sportsmaster and Tigress in the present, reunites with his family and claims to Stargirl that he has reformed while his allies cripple her JSA. In the forest, Icicle visited Dragon King in Ultra-Humanite's albino gorilla body and tells him "it's time". While fighting the heroes, Lily is killed by a falling car while Icicle is shattered once more by Cameron. Three months later, Icicle reconstituted himself once more and was laying low in Copenhagen, where he is killed by Artemis.

=== Henry King Sr. / Brainwave ===
Henry King Sr. (portrayed by Christopher James Baker) is a member of the Injustice Society with psionic abilities, the father of Henry King Jr. and a neurosurgeon at Blue Valley Medical Center.

Henry was born on October 12, 1971, to an abusive and neglectful father, who believed lessons had to be taught physically and with emotional impact. When Henry was a boy, he shoplifted a ball that he wanted but his father made him take it back. In protest, Henry threw the ball into a well. His father hung him upside down by the ankles over the well, threatening that if Henry ever disobeyed again, he would be dropped into the dark well. That moment of trauma shaped Henry's life, as he felt defenseless and weak ever since.

Decades ago, Henry King was a mere laboratory scientist who struggled to be taken seriously by his peers. He created cerebral expansion experiments that would, hopefully, grant people more access to the cerebral cortex of their brains. His superiors closed down his experiment and deemed it too dangerous. Henry decided to proceed against their orders and secretly use the experiments on himself. He began to manifest migraines and, during a mugging, read a man's mind for the first time. He also used telekinesis to save himself and gave the man a seizure just by thinking of it. From that point on, Henry documented every day of his journey with his powers by recording himself on a series of VHS tapes. The tapes would later be stored in his secret Brainwave room in his residence. When his powers manifested, Henry learned what he believed to be the real version of humanity. He heard wicked thoughts that made him grow to despise humans. He killed to make his mind feel better, as that was the only relief he could get from his headaches. After these events, Henry assumed the alias of the "terrible telepath" Brainwave, a powerful villain. He also joined the Injustice Society of America where he began working with Icicle to achieve Project: New America. His telepathic abilities would allow the Injustice Society to take control of every developed mind in six states to carve out the "perfect" America. Around this time, he robbed a bank where he was apprehended by Merri, the "Girl of A Thousand Gimmicks", whose pure thoughts gave him pause. He was captivated by her.

They eventually married and had a son who they named Henry King Jr. after Dr. King. They settled in California where the Injustice Society encountered their costumed counterparts, the JSA. Merri's brother operated as Starman, a member of the JSA. This caused conflict and paired with Merri's positive influence, Henry began to question Jordan's plan. On Christmas Eve, 2010, Jordan lured the JSA to California where Henry fought alongside his fellow Injustice Society members as Brainwave. During the battle, Brainwave had killed Hawkman, Hawkgirl, and Johnny Thunder offscreen. Brainwave then faced off against Starman and the two had a war of mind and will. Brainwave was ultimately knocked down by Starman, who was later impaled by Icicle.

After the battle, Henry returned home and was forced to tell Merri about her brother's death and the role he played in it. He wanted her to go into hiding and run, but she refused and he knew she would never forgive him for the role he played in Sylvester's murder. Henry was forced to choose between the Injustice Society and Merri, so he drowned Merri in their pool. He then picked Junior up from school and told him that Merri had died in an accident, that there was nothing he could do to save her. Henry promptly moved to Blue Valley, Nebraska, seemingly to help further Project: New America due to the town's ideal tunnel system.

After discovering that Stargirl had come into possession of Starman's Cosmic Staff and learning her secret identity in the present, Henry Sr. attempts to kill her and take the staff from her, but she defeats him and puts him into a coma. As part of the Injustice Society's plans for Project: New America, Icicle makes preparations to revive Henry Sr. After the latter's son Henry Jr. murders his attorney, Henry Sr. wakes up from his coma and rejoins the Injustice Society after Dragon King cures his amnesia. During a fight with the Injustice Society, Henry had no choice but to kill his own son by collapsing the ceiling on him. When Stargirl leads a new iteration of the JSA against the Injustice Society, Henry Sr. attempts to manipulate Wildcat by using her memories of his son against her, but she sees through his tactics and kills him.

=== Barbara Whitmore ===
Barbara Whitmore (portrayed by Amy Smart) is Courtney's mother and Pat Dugan's wife who strives to balance her work and home life. After her marriage to Pat, she initially serves as a surrogate mother to her stepson Mike and also to Courtney's JSA teammates after discovering Pat and Courtney's secrets.

Barbara was born and raised in Blue Valley, Nebraska. She moved to California during her adulthood, which is around the time she met Sam Kurtis. They had a daughter together, Courtney, which is when Barbara settled into Valley Village, California. Sam was never present in Courtney or Barbara's life, leaving her to primarily be a single mother.

On Christmas Eve 2010, Barbara Whitmore waited impatiently at her house with her daughter, Courtney, waiting for Courtney's father to arrive. When he failed to show and Barbara had to work, she asked her longtime friend Maggie Kramer if Courtney could stay at her house for the evening. Maggie agreed happily and told Barbara that they are friends and she's happy to help. Barbara kissed her daughter goodbye saying that Maggie will watch her while Barbara's at work. Courtney understands but cries that she wants her father, which Barbara knows. She leaves for work while Courtney looks out the window waiting for a man that would never show.

In 2018, Barbara met Pat Dugan at Richie's Diner while visiting Blue Valley to settle her deceased mother's estate. They ordered the same food – a corn dog and banana split. They had an instant connection and were married two years later. After accepting a job in Blue Valley, Barbara, her husband, daughter, and stepson moved from California to Blue Valley. She gets a job at the American Dream.

=== Pat Dugan / S.T.R.I.P.E. ===
Patrick "Pat" Dugan (portrayed by Luke Wilson) is a Courtney's stepfather, the former sidekick to Starman, and a mechanic who owns a repair garage where he stores a 15-foot robotic vehicle of his own creation made from spare car parts. Pat serves as a reluctant mentor and father figure to Courtney and her JSA teammates while using a garage called The Pit Stop as a front. Despite his superheroics, Pat wants to provide a normal life for his family.

Pat's father was a mechanic in the army who worked on tanks. His work required the Dugan family to move around a lot, especially when he was a teenager. Every year or two they had to pack up and move to a new place. The constant moving never allowed Pat to form lasting friendships, so he grew close to his father and regarded him as his best friend. At some point, Pat followed in his father's footsteps and joined the army.

When Pat was twenty, he was hired by the Pemberton family to serve as their mechanic and driver. He befriended the Pemberton's fifteen-year-old son, Sylvester. One day, Sylvester put on a mask to stop criminals that were threatening his parents, and Pat helped him in his endeavor. Their partnership eventually turned to friendship with Sylvester and Pat becoming the superheroes Star-Spangled Kid and S.T.R.I.P.E. The duo caught the attention of Civic City News when they defeated the villain Doctor Weerd. Pat and Sylvester joined the Seven Soldiers of Victory, which disbanded after Dragon King went into hiding.

A few years later, Sylvester found the cosmic staff and reinvented himself as the adult superhero Starman, though Pat still operated as his sidekick. Sylvester was recruited into the JSA, an elite team of superheroes that gained much media attention. Sylvester brought Pat into the JSA and the team became very close. Pat served as the team's sidekick and took care of their artifacts and suits. After Starman and much of the JSA were killed in battle, Pat ensured the JSA's tools and suits, including Starman's staff, were safely stored in the JSA headquarters. Two years to the series' events, Pat followed Rex's research to Blue Valley, Nebraska, where he married Barbara Whitmore.

=== Cameron Mahkent ===
Cameron "Cam" Mahkent (portrayed by Hunter Sansone; Roger Dale Floyd as a child) is a student at Blue Valley High, aspiring artist, and the son of Jordan Mahkent who was born with cryokinetic powers like his father. He and Courtney share a mutual crush.

Cameron was born to Jordan and Christine Mahkent in Blue Valley, Nebraska. Eight years ago, Cameron's mother, Christine, was exposed to a toxin that ultimately gave her cancer. At this point, he was living with his father and grandparents. One night, Cameron's father, Jordan, took Cameron to say goodbye to his dying mother. Cameron gave Christine a floral drawing of her garden, to which she told him to never stop drawing. They hugged but she went into a cardiac episode which scared Cameron, and he ran away. She died later that night and Cameron was primarily raised by his grandparents, while his father left to explore the country and hunt down the people responsible for Christine's death.

In the second and third seasons, Cameron manifests cryokinesis similar to his family. After witnessing Cameron's abilities, Courtney attempts to persuade him to use his abilities for good. After Icicle is apparently killed, Courtney covers up Mike's actions by stating that she did it which puts a strain on their relationship. Cameron was later with his grandparents when Icicle turned up alive and was told more about his family's life as well as learning that Mike was the one who ran Pat's truck into Icicle. He later had a talk with Courtney about his father and apparently showed no ill-will towards Mike during their discussion. During the fight against Icicle's family, Cameron fought Hourman before turning against his father. When Stargirl offers to help Cameron, he takes his leave to get his grandfather some medical attention. Cameron later returns to see if Courtney is right about wanting to help him.

Ten years later, Cameron is a member of the JSA as Icicle.

=== Eclipso ===
Eclipso (portrayed by Nick Tarabay and Milo Stein portrays Eclipso's form of Bruce) is an entity trapped inside a black diamond that Cindy obtains. He plans to become a god by feeding on the negativity and darkness of the people on Earth.

Eclipso is an entity of vengeance and evil that was given life by and once resided in the Shadowlands, a place of darkness and shadows. The Black Diamond originated on Diablo Island, a now-forgotten island in the Pacific Ocean. Diablo Island was removed from maps by 1832, as those who visited never returned. According to legend, there were two warring tribes living on either side of the island. One tribe summoned an evil entity of vengeance to weaponize against their enemies. They sealed the entity inside the black diamond.

An explorer named Bruce Gordon rediscovered Diablo Island, but when he arrived everyone had been dead for decades. He found the Black Diamond and picked it up, which made him susceptible to the effects of Eclipso's powers. He returned to the mainland and used Eclipso's influence to achieve fame as one of the greatest explorers in the world. Bruce wrote many books about the island and reached notoriety for being the only person who ever returned. Eventually, Bruce grew weary of the price his fame and riches cost, including Eclipso ruining his friends and colleagues. Gordon contemplated suicide, but Eclipso convinced him he could help reclaim his lost love Nora by killing her husband. Bruce would not take someone's life, but Eclipso offered to do it for him and Bruce Gordon's body was completely taken over by Eclipso.

In season two, Cindy Burman works with Eclipso to form a version of the Injustice Society called Injustice Unlimited. After recruiting Isaac Bowin and Artemis Crock, they battle Stargirl's JSA and Shade until Stargirl accidentally breaks the Black Diamond. Free of his imprisonment, Eclipso betrays Cindy, sending her to the Shadowlands. Utilizing Gordon's likeness, Eclipso soon resurfaces to torment the JSA and Stargirl's family. After Shade rescues Stargirl and Burman, the pair join forces with the JSA, Sportsmaster, Tigress, Starman, Grundy, and Thunderbolt to fight Eclipso, with Thunderbolt transforming Eclipso into toast.

=== Lawrence "Crusher" Crock / Sportsmaster ===
Lawrence "Crusher" Crock / Sportsmaster (recurring season 1; guest season 2; main season 3; portrayed by Neil Hopkins) is a member of the Injustice Society who wields sports-themed weapons and believes that all of his targets are just part of a game to win. Sportsmaster partook in the ISA's attack on the Justice Society's headquarters. Ten years later, Crusher is the owner of a gym in Blue Valley called Ripped City, is married to Paula Brooks, and is the father of Artemis Crock. In "The Justice Society", Sportsmaster and Tigress were instructed by Icicle to dust off their outfits to help Gambler with his mission while also mentioning the complaint they received from Anaya Bowin about killing another coach. As they met Gambler while watching Artemis perform on the football field, they go over their plans for the mission and even take the moment to scold Gambler for littering near them upon his arrival. Sportsmaster and Tigress attack and overpower Stargirl and her friends when they attempt to intercept an ISA operation only to be driven off by S.T.R.I.P.E. Sportsmaster assists the ISA in enacting Project: New America. Both of them are defeated by Stargirl's JSA.

In season two, it is mentioned that Sportsmaster and Tigress are incarcerated. Sportsmaster and Tigress temporarily break out of prison to see their daughter Artemis' football tryouts. In the episode "Summer School: Chapter Thirteen", Artemis breaks Sportsmaster and Tigress out of prison so that they can help Cindy Burman and the JSA fight Eclipso. Following this, the Crock family move in next door to the Whitmore-Dugan family much to the dismay.

In season three, Sportsmaster reopens Ripped City, gets Pat back on their training regiment, and advises Pat not to trust Eclipso. While it was claimed that neither Sportsmaster or Tigress had any involvement in Gambler's death, both of them appear to be sharing a secret. This turned out to be that Gambler once blackmailed them. Sylvester confronted both Crocks while they were grocery shopping and fought them until S.T.R.I.P.E. arrived to break it up. Both Crocks did confirm that Gambler blackmailed them once and the payments in question were paid off. Crusher later checked up on Pat when he was looking for Mike's biological mother. Crusher and Paula later visit Sofus and Lily where they advised them to forgive the JSA for what happened to Icicle. Later that night, Crusher and Paula are killed by Icicle.

=== Paula Brooks / Tigress ===
Paula Brooks / Tigress (recurring season 1; guest season 2; main season 3; portrayed by Joy Osmanski) is a member of the Injustice Society. Ten years prior to the series' events, Tigress took part in the ISA's attack on the JSA's headquarters.

In the present day, Paula is a gym teacher at Blue Valley High, the wife of "Crusher" Crock, and mother of Artemis Crock. Paula and Crusher return to the identities of Sportsmaster and Tigress, but are defeated and imprisoned. The Crocks maintain their relationship with Artemis, who breaks them out of prison. After being freed, the Crocks move in next door to the Whitmore-Dugan family.

In season three, Paula and Crusher are killed by a reconstituted Icicle. Her death would later be avenged by Artemis when she kills Icicle in Copenhagen.

=== Sylvester Pemberton / Starman ===
Sylvester Pemberton / Starman (guest season 1; recurring season 2; main season 3; portrayed by Joel McHale) is a member of the original JSA who used an anti-gravity Cosmic Staff invented by scientist Ted Knight that Courtney later finds. Pat Dugan served as his sidekick during their early days and Sylvester has a sister named Merry who was married to Brainwave. Sylvester was killed during the Injustice Society's battle with the Justice Society.

In the present day, Sylvester mysteriously returns from the dead. It is later revealed that Sylvester's staff altered his body, giving him regenerative abilities that allowed him to survive. In the third season, Sylvester's brain is removed from his body, enabling Ultra-Humanite to transfer his brain into his body. Ten years later, Sylvester's brain is found and reunited with his body.

=== Jakeem Williams / Jakeem Thunder ===
Jakeem Williams / Jakeem Thunder (guest season 2; main season 3; portrayed by Alkoya Brunson) is a gamer who is Mike Dugan's best friend, the younger brother of Jenny Williams, and the current keeper of Thunderbolt's pen.

When Mike wishes for the pen to be in better hands, it ends up in the hands of Jakeem Williams. He does makes some wishes that resulted in larger foods appearing in Blue Valley. When Thunderbolt returns from China with Chinese food, he grants a wish for a replacement part for S.T.R.I.P.E. to appear. Thunderbolt assists in the attack on Eclipso where he manages to shock him before Eclipso threw him into S.T.R.I.P.E. After Eclipso was weakened, Thunderbolt granted Jakeem's wish for Eclipso to be toast as he turns Eclipso into toast during Courtney and Jennie's final attack on him.

In season three, Jakeem, Mike, and Shiv discover that Dragon King placed his brain into Ultra-Humanite's body. In order to save Shiv, Thunderbolt transforms Dragon King into a white gorilla plush toy. Ten years later, Jakeem joins the JSA as Jakeem Thunder.

== Recurring characters ==
Actor	Character	Seasons		
Actor	Character	1	2	3
Brian Stapf	Ted Grant / Wildcat	Guest	Recurring	
Henry Thomas	Charles McNider / Doctor Mid-Nite	Recurring		
Alex Collins	Charles McNider / Doctor Mid-Nite		Recurring	Guest
Ashley Winfrey	Jenny Williams	Recurring	Guest	
Wil Deusner	Joey Zarick	Recurring	Guest	
Stella Smith	Artemis Crock	Recurring	Recurring	Recurring
Eric Goins	Steven Sharpe / Gambler	Recurring		Recurring
Hina Khan	Anaya Bowin	Recurring	Guest	
Mark Ashworth	Justin / Shining Knight	Recurring		
Max Frantz	Isaac Bowin	Recurring	Recurring	
Maria Sager	Maria Carmen Saravia	Guest	Recurring	Recurring
Sam Brooks	Travis Thomas	Recurring		Guest
Jasun Jabbar	Brian Tanner Balloid	Recurring	Guest	Guest
Kron Moore	Dr. Bridget Chapel	Recurring	Recurring	Recurring
Gilbert Glenn Brown	James Chapel	Guest	Recurring	Recurring
Jim France	Sofus Mahkent	Recurring	Guest	Recurring
Kay Galvin	Lily Mahkent	Recurring	Guest	Recurring
Nelson Lee	Dr. Shiro Ito / Dragon King	Recurring	Guest	Guest
King Orba	Zeek	Guest	Recurring	Recurring
Kikey Castillo	Maria Montez	Guest	Guest	Recurring
Ysa Penarejo	Jennie-Lynn Hayden		Recurring	Guest
Jonathan Cake	Richard Swift / The Shade		Recurring	Recurring
Jim Gaffigan	Thunderbolt		Guest	
Seth Green	Thunderbolt			Recurring

=== Introduced in season one ===
==== Ted Grant / Wildcat ====
Ted Grant / Wildcat (portrayed by Brian Stapf) is a former heavyweight boxer and skilled street fighter and member of the JSA. He wore an exosuit that artificially enhanced his natural athletic prowess. Grant was killed in battle with the Injustice Society, with Yolanda Montez receiving his suit in the present day.

==== Charles McNider / Doctor Mid-Nite ====
Charles McNider / Doctor Mid-Nite (portrayed by Henry Thomas in season one, Alex Collins in season two-three) is a member of the original JSA who was a detective and a brilliant and forward-thinking medical pioneer with special goggles equipped with an A.I., later named "Chuck" by Beth, patterned on his personality to aid him in fighting crime.

In season two, Shade denied that he killed McNider. It turns out that he was secretly rescued by Shade during the ISA's attack and lost him in the Shadowlands. McNider eventually makes contact with Chapel and later encounters Courtney Whitmore and Cindy Burman after Eclipso sent them to the Shadowlands. Once Shade uses his abilities to free the trio, McNider and Chapel work to find Eclipso. After Whitmore's JSA defeat Eclipso, McNider gives Chapel his blessing to continue operating as Doctor Mid-Nite before she informs him that his wife has settled in Melody Hills, where she now has a son.

In season three, McNider returns to Blue Valley to help examine Sylvester Pemberton's wounds. He postulates that the Cosmic Staff has granted him a healing factor and even mentions that he and his family are doing well. McNider and Chapel analyze the skin sample found at the scene of Gambler's murder and find that it matches Dragon King's skin. McNider would later send Bridget and James the information needed for Beth to access her suit's combat abilities and the defibrilator in her gloves after Sofus had a heart attack. Following the defeat of Icicle and Ultra-Humanite, Charles scanned Sylvester's body and notes that Ultra-Humanite's brain is comatose. He suggests keeping Ultra-Humanite on life support until Sylvester's brain was found.

===== Chuck =====
"Chuck" (voiced by Henry Thomas in season one, Alex Collins in season two) is an A.I. of Charles McNider.

==== Jenny Williams ====
Jenny Williams (season 1; guest season 2; portrayed by Ashley Winfrey) is a student at Blue Valley High School, the best friend of Cindy Burman, co-captain of the school's cheerleading squad, and the older sister of Jakeem.

==== Artemis Crock ====
Artemis Crock (portrayed by Stella Smith) is the daughter of "Crusher" Crock and Paula Brooks and a star athlete at Blue Valley High School.

In season two, Artemis is in a foster home following the arrest of her parents. Thanks to Eclipso, she joins Cindy's Injustice Unlimited.

In season three, Artemis moves next door to the Whitmore-Dugan's and wants to join the new JSA during Paula's discussion with Barbara. She tries to prove himself by taking out the No Limits Gang. Paula later informed Barbara of Artemis' impression in front of the JSA. Artemis later helps Beth fight Sofus. Artemis later calls her parents to inform them that she got into Nebraska. When her parents do not come home, Artemis informs the Whitmore-Dugan family. She, Courtney, Yolanda, and Beth find that Icicle has killed her parents. While mourning her parents, Artemis is approached by Barbara, who invites her to live with her family. Three months after the defeat of Icicle and Dragon King, Artemis kills Icicle and avenges her parents.

Ten years later, Artemis is stated to have joined the Justice Society.

==== Steven Sharpe / Gambler ====
Steven Sharpe / Gambler (season 1; guest season 3; portrayed by Eric Goins) is a member of the ISA and former leader of the No Limits Gang who is a master in the art of deception, wields a derringer, owns a pet cat, and is depicted as an enemy of Doctor Mid-Nite.

Sharpe is the CFO of The American Dream with an egocentric and cut-off personality. Sharpe meets with Icicle to discuss whether Stargirl is a potential threat to their plans. Gambler later met with Sportsmaster and Tigress in their civilian identities to talk about the mission that involves him getting the data they need for Project: New America. Afterwards, the two of them scold Gambler for the littering he committed near them and demands that he picks up the discarded garbage which he does. Gambler's mission was a success with Sportsmaster and Tigress holding off the ISA. After assisting Icicle in making preparations, Sharpe helps the ISA enact Project: New America in the two-part episode, "Stars and S.T.R.I.P.E.", but after Stargirl's JSA foil their plans, he wipes the ISA's servers and escapes while his teammates are either killed or captured.

In season three, Gambler returns to Blue Valley after hearing about Eclipso's defeat. He tries to get the Whitmore-Dugan family and Shade to help locate his estranged daughter Rebecca to no avail. While searching for her online while writing a letter to her, Gambler discovers that someone has placed a surveillance system on specific parts of Blue Valley. Upon investigating one of them outside his trailer, Gambler is killed by an unknown figure, later revealed to be Icicle and Ultra-Humanite.

==== Solomon Grundy ====
Solomon Grundy is a towering zombie and member of the ISA. Grundy accompanied the Injustice Society in their attack on the JSA's headquarters. In the ten years since the attack, Grundy has been kept under "The American Dream's" corporate headquarters in a reinforced cell to keep him under control, though he was released once to kill Hourman and his wife when they came close to interfering with the Injustice Society.

By the present day however, Hourman's son Rick Tyler took up his father's mantle to seek revenge on Grundy. Though the two meet and fight in the season one finale, Rick spares Grundy's life and lets him go under the condition that he never returns.

In season two, Rick hears news about a "bear" breaking into restaurants for food. To avoid further incidents, Rick leaves some food in part of the forest that Grundy was sighted in. Grundy later came out and shared some apples with Rick. Due to Eclipso's powers, Rick saw his uncle Matt as Grundy who supposedly killed a girl. After Rick was arrested and Matt was hospitalized, Grundy sadly watches from a far and quotes "friend". Grundy later assists the JSA in fighting Eclipso, only to be killed.

In season three, Rick is trying to solve Shade's cryptic information on the right burial and time for Grundy. After Icicle and Ultra-Humanite's defeat, Rick visits where he buried Grundy as he comes back to life.

Ten years later, Shade mentions that Grundy is a member of the JSA.

==== Anaya Bowin ====
Anaya Bowin (season 1; guest season 2; portrayed by Hina Khan) is the principal of Blue Valley High School, a skilled violinist, the mother of Isaac Bowin, and secretly a member of the ISA. She is also the widow of the Fiddler.

In her first appearance, she drags Courtney away to deal with her after she shoved Henry King Jr. into a passing lunch lady. When Cindy calls Courtney a bitch in retaliation, Principal Bowin scolds Cindy for using such language. She later hosted an open house and even visited a comatose Brainwave in the hospital. When Icicle returned to Blue Valley, Bowin sent a text to him about Sportsmaster and Tigress killing another coach. Principal Bowin accompanied Gambler in obtaining a part for Project New America. In the season finale, Anaya gives her son some advice about his bullying problem by talking about her husband. When Anaya is sent to aid Sportsmaster and Tigress in hunting the Whitmore-Dugan family, she is killed by Tigress for insulting them.

==== Justin / Shining Knight ====
Justin / Shining Knight (season 1; portrayed by Mark Ashworth) is a janitor at Blue Valley High School with amnesia who is formerly a centuries-old vigilante, a knight from Camelot who carries Excalibur, and member of the Seven Soldiers of Victory.

Justin later uses his enchanted sword to save Stargirl from Cindy Burman. Justin receives recurring visions and seeks out Pat Dugan, Rick Tyler, and Beth Chapel for help. After hallucinating them as Dragon King and his drones, Pat talks Justin down and reveals to his allies the latter's true identity as Shining Knight. Justin assists the JSA in thwarting the Injustice Society's plans before leaving to find other surviving members of his team.

==== Isaac Bowin ====
Isaac Bowin (seasons 1–2; portrayed by Max Frantz) is a student at Blue Valley High School and the son of Anaya Bowin and the Fiddler. He is a savant musician. Before her untimely death at the hands of Tigress, Anaya gives some word of wisdom about his father when advising Isaac to deal with his bully problems. He fights his tormentor which is broken up by a teacher as Isaac stated that his mother advised him to do it.

In season two, he joins Cindy's Injustice Unlimited after she tells him about his parents' secret life. When Eclipso is freed, Isaac is consumed by him. He was listed as "missing" on the fliers. Isaac appeared with his mother in the Shadowlands.

==== Maria Carmen Saravia ====
Maria Carmen Saravia (portrayed by Maria Sager) is a waitress at Richie's Diner.

==== Joey Zarick ====
Joey Zarick (portrayed by Wil Deusner) is the son of William Zarick and an aspiring magician. He was killed when Icicle caused him to be struck by an approaching vehicle. In season two, Joey appears in the Shadowlands with his family.

==== Travis Thomas ====
Travis Thomas (portrayed by Sam Brooks) is a tough jock at Blue Valley High School who is friends with Henry King Jr.

In season three, Travis and Brian try to demand money from Mike and Jakeem. After a wish to Thunderbolt to have them act nicer backfires, Cindy showed up and fought them off.

==== Brian Tanner Balloid ====
Brian Tanner Balloid (portrayed by Jasun Jabbar) is a jock at Blue Valley High School and one of Henry Jr.'s friends.

In season three, Brian and Travid try to demand money from Mike and Jakeem. After a wish to Thunderbolt to have them act nicer backfires, Cindy showed up and fought them off.

==== Bridget Chapel ====
Bridget Chapel (portrayed by Kron Moore) is the mother of Beth Chapel who works as a doctor at the Blue Valley Medical Center.

In season two, Bridget finds out about Beth's role as Doctor Mid-Nite following their encounter with Eclipso and supports her.

In season three, Bridget and James pitch ideas of a new Doctor Mid-Nite costume to Beth. She later helps heal Sylvester Pemberton at the sight of Gambler's murder when Charles McNider is called in. Beth later advised them to maintain their distance from her Doctor Mid-Nite activity since she does not want them to end up like Sylvester's sister Merry or Charles' daughter Rebecca. She and James later contact Beth to inform her about the combat features of her suit that Charles told them about. Bridget would later examine Rick. After the defeat of Icicle and Ultra-Humanite, Beth finally accepted her parents' help upon mentioning that she was tricked into keeping them away.

==== James Chapel ====
James Chapel (portrayed by Gilbert Glenn Brown) is the father of Beth Chapel and the husband of Bridget Chapel who works as a businessman at The American Dream.

In season two, James finds out about Beth's role as Doctor Mid-Nite following their encounter with Eclipso and supports her.

In season three, James and Bridget pitch ideas of a new Doctor Mid-Nite costume to Beth. Beth later advised them to maintain their distance from her Doctor Mid-Nite activity since she does not want them to end up like Sylvester's sister Merry or Charles McNider's daughter Rebecca. He and Bridget later contact Beth to inform her about the combat features of her suit that Charles told them about. After the defeat of Icicle and Ultra-Humanite, Beth finally accepted her parents' help upon mentioning that she was tricked into keeping them away.

==== Sofus Mahkent ====
Sofus Mahkent (portrayed by Jim France) is the father of Jordan and grandfather of Cameron who supports Jordan's campaign and also has cryokinetic powers. He helps to raise Cameron when Jordan is away.

In season two, Sofus and Lily continue to raise Cameron after Jordan's death as they talk about how Cameron is still interacting with Courtney after what happened to Jordan. Following Eclipso's defeat in the season finale and Cameron finishing his mural for his father, Sofus and Lily reveal their cryokinesis to Cameron.

In season three, Sofus and Lily offer a piece of advice to Cameron when his emerging cryokinesis is affecting his art skills. They advise him to give up art for a while. Sofus and Lily witness Cameron still interacting with Courtney. While Sofus was easy on it, Lily was secretly hostile about it. Sofus and Lily were later visited by Paul Deisinger about Cameron quitting art class. When Lily killed Paul, Sofus was surprised and had to dispose of his body offscreen. At the time when Rick stormed the Mahkent family's house to attack Cameron, Sofus engaged Beth in battle even when Artemis joined the fight. Sofus ended the conflicts in a draw stating that Jordan's evil did him in and then suffered a heart attack. With information from Bridget and James Chapel, Beth used the defibrilator in her gloves to restart his heart as 911 is called. After getting out of the hospital, Sofus tells Pat and Sylvester about how their people were hunted back in Europe. He and Lily were later visited by Crusher and Paula who advised them to forgive the ISA for what happened to Icicle. They were later reunited with a still-alive Icicle. During the fight between Ithe JSA and Icicle's family, Sofus and Beth could not bring themselves to fight each other again as they witness Lily accidentally getting crushed by a falling car. Following Icicle's defeat, Cameron takes Sofus away to get him medical help.

==== Lily Mahkent ====
Lily Mahkent (portrayed by Kay Galvin) is the mother of Jordan, the wife of Sofus, and the grandmother of Cameron who supports Jordan's campaign and also has cryokinetic powers. She helps to raise Cameron when Jordan is away.

In season two, Lily and Sofus continue to raise Cameron after Jordan's death as they talks about how Cameron is still interacting with Courtney after what happened to Jordan. She even advised Cindy to stay away from Cameron. Following Eclipso's defeat in the season finale and Cameron finishing his mural for his father, Lily and Sofus reveal their cryokinesis to Cameron.

In season three, Lily and Sofus offer a piece of advice to Cameron when his emerging cryokinesis is affecting his art skills. They advise him to give up art for a while. Sofus and Lily witness Cameron still interacting with Courtney. While Lily was hostile towards it, Sofus was not. Paul Deisinger later visited the Mahkents about Cameron quitting art class. Lily retaliated by killing Paul causing Sofus to dispose of his body offscreen. At the time when Rick stormed the Mahkent family's house to attack Cameron, Lily engaged Yolanda in battle. Sofus ended the conflicts in a draw stating that Jordan's evil did him in. Lily was shocked when Sofus suffered a heart attack as Beth uses the defibrilator in her gloves to restart his heart. When Lily paid a visit to Barbara, she was repelled by Paula. She and Sofus were later visited by Crusher and Paula who advised them to forgive the ISA for what happened to Icicle. After they left, Lily mourned Icicle. Lily, Sofus, and Cameron were later reunited with a still-alive Icicle. During the fight between the JSA and Icicle's family, Lily fought Wildcat. As she gets angered that Sofus will not fight Beth, she is accidentally crushed by a falling car.

==== Dr. Shiro Ito / Dragon King ====
Dr. Shiro Ito / Dragon King (season 1; guest season 2; portrayed by Nelson Lee) is a close ally of the ISA and the father of Cindy Burman. A controversial scientist who hides his reptilian face and experiments on himself and his patients. He was originally an Imperial Japanese war criminal from WWII who was supposedly executed for his crimes before secretly falling in with the ISA. Dragon King helped Ultra-Humanite by taking his brain out of Delores Winters and placing it in the body of an albino gorilla that was found by Congo Bill.

Dragon King meets with Icicle to discuss his support for the Injustice Society's plans involving a machine the latter is building and Shade betraying the group. While he considers late member Wizard to be vile, Dragon King gets Icicle's approval to obtain Wizard's body for further experiments. Dragon King is also concerned with the possibility of Brainwave's son Henry King Jr. developing powers of his own, to the point of forcing his daughter Cindy Burman to date King in order to keep watch over him. Dragon King's suspicions prove correct when Cindy fights Stargirl and King uses psychic powers to knock them down after getting caught in the crossfire. Stargirl leads the JSA in an attack on the Injustice Society's subterranean headquarters, during which they discover Dragon King had acquired reptilian traits. During the Justice Society's second attack on the Injustice Society, Dragon King is fatally wounded by Cindy who slashes him in the back.

In season two, Dragon King appears in Cindy's flashback watching her from the shadows. Then he appears in the Shadowlands with his drones where he tries to complete her.

In season three, Shiv, Mike, and Jakeem find Dragon King's body in one of his labs where its brain was removed. They find that it was placed inside Ultra-Humanite's albino gorilla body as he goes on the attack. While fighting the heroes, Dragon King is turned into a plush white gorilla by Jakeem Williams and Thunderbolt.

==== Zeek ====
Zeek (portrayed by King Orba) is the owner of a junkyard. Pat befriends him when looking for scrap metal to make use of.

==== Maria Montez ====
Maria Montez (portrayed by Kikey Castillo) is Yolanda's Catholic mother and the wife of Juan. During Yolanda's high school days, Maria supported Yolanda in her run for school president until Cindy Burman leaked the topless photos of Yolanda that Henry King Jr. asked for. This incident resulted in her parents revealing their true abusive natures and they had started to treat Yolanda quite badly for no clear reason at all. Consumed by this incident, Maria and Juan grounded Yolanda where they have her head to her room upon getting home, no longer took her to church or came near Blue Valley High School. Following Yolanda's first outing as Wildcat, Maria and Juan scold her for being out of her room when she comes back into the house. Yolanda tries to get her parents to forgive her for the incident to no avail. Maria still claims that Yolanda has disgraced herself and the family while Juan sends Yolanda to her room.

In season three, Yolanda persuades Maria to allow her to do late shifts at Richie's Diner. Maria only allows this because Juan lost his job while stating that the tips go to her college fund. She starts to get suspicious of Yolanda's secret activities. During a blackout caused by Beth, Maria confronts Yolanda, forcing her to move out. Following the defeat of Icicle and Ultra-Humanite, Yolanda calls her mother again stating that she lied to protect her and that the truth may mend their relationship.

=== Introduced in season two ===
==== Jennie-Lynn Hayden ====
Jennie-Lynn Hayden (guest: season 2-present; portrayed by Ysa Penarejos as a teenager, Katie Swift as a young girl) is the daughter of Alan Scott / Green Lantern who grew up in an orphanage and seeks to reunite with her twin brother Todd Rice.

She breaks into Courtney Whitmore's home to retrieve her father Alan Scott's lantern, only to be attacked by Courtney. After Jennie introduces herself to Courtney and the latter's family, Courtney becomes skeptical of Jennie's intentions, believing she is a mole for the Injustice Society. As Pat Dugan trains Jennie to control her powers, which initially appear connected to Alan's lantern, Courtney eventually apologizes. After feeling isolated and emotional over her missing brother Todd Rice, Jennie breaks the lantern and strengthens her powers, after which Dugan theorizes Jennie herself is the source. Following this, Jennie leaves to find Rice, though Courtney and Dugan later recruit her to help them fight Eclipso. Courtney and Pat later find her in Civic City and a clue to where her brother is. In season three, Jennie reunites with Todd, who has been held at the Helix Institute.

Ten years later, Shade is stated to have joined the Justice Society as Jade.

==== Richard Swift / Shade ====
Richard Swift / Shade (season 2; portrayed by Jonathan Cake) (Note: Shade is portrayed by an uncredited actor in "Stars & S.T.R.I.P.E. Part Two".) is an immortal supervillain who can generate and control shadows and a former member of the Injustice Society.

Following the thwarting of Project New America, Shade has resurfaced as a traveling collector of items to seek out the Black Diamond. After being confronted by Stargirl's Justice Society, Swift reveals his reasons for being with the ISA, denies killing Mid-Nite, and demands to be left alone, claiming he will leave peacefully once he gets what he wants. While a battle ensues, Swift subdues the heroes before escaping. In a later confrontation, he reveals to Stargirl that Eclipso murdered Mid-Nite's daughter Rebecca. After receiving help from Stargirl's mother Barbara Whitmore, Swift intervenes during a fight between the Justice Society and Injustice Unlimited in an attempt to destroy the Black Diamond, but Stargirl inadvertently breaks it and frees Eclipso, who forces Swift to flee. Eventually, Swift resurfaces to aid Stargirl in reconstructing the Black Diamond, claiming it can be used to trap Eclipso once more. He later reveals his deception, using the diamond to strengthen his powers and summon Eclipso, who sends Stargirl to the Shadowlands. Subsequently, Swift seeks a darkened theater to recuperate. Barbara and her husband Pat Dugan find and convince him to open a portal to the Shadowlands so that Stargirl, Mid-Nite, and Cindy Burman can escape. The effort seemingly kills Swift, who dissipates in a cloud of dark energy, but he later returns to help the Justice Society defeat Eclipso. Ten years later, Shade is working as a tour guide at the Justice Society museum.

==== Thunderbolt ====
Thunderbolt (voiced by Jim Gaffigan in season 2, Seth Green in Season 3) is a fifth-dimensional genie who resides in a pink pen. He requires strict rules to grant wishes: the user has to use specific wording when making a wish, cannot directly wish for death, cannot receive the same wish twice, and cannot resurrect the dead. Thunderbolt and Johnny Thunder were with the JSA until they were attacked by the Injustice Society, during which Johnny was killed by Brainwave and Thunderbolt was left trapped in his pen for over 10 years after Johnny wished for him to return to it and wait for a new owner that was like him.

In season two, Mike obtains the pen and befriends Thunderbolt. Following a confrontation with Shade, Mike unknowingly wishes for the pen to end up in better hands, causing it to be teleported to Jakeem Williams. In season three, Thunderbolt becomes Jakeem's companion.

== Guest stars ==
=== Introduced in season one ===
- Rex Tyler/Hourman (portrayed by Lou Ferrigno Jr.) - A member of the original Justice Society and the father of Rick Tyler who was "a master chemist and adrenaline junkie" and used an amulet of his creation to gain superhuman strength for one hour at a time. Rex survived the battle with the Injustice Society that killed much of the Justice Society, but was killed by Solomon Grundy along with his wife Wendi while fleeing Blue Valley. Rick Tyler would go on to take up his father's mantle and amulet to avenge his parents.
- William Zarick/Wizard (portrayed by Joe Knezevich) - A member of the ISA who uses magic. In his civilian identity, Zarick works as a Blue Valley councilman as well as an executive and financial supporter of a prominent business called The American Dream, which is run by other former members of the Injustice Society. He is also the father of aspiring magician Joey Zarick and the husband of Denise Zarick. Having grown weary of his obligations to the ISA and wanting a normal life with his family, he rebuffs his former leader Icicle when he comes to seek help against Stargirl amidst her attempts to revive the Justice Society. After Joey is killed in an accident that Icicle caused, Zarick confronts him to avenge his son, only to be frozen to death.
- Mary Kramer (portrayed by Annie Thurman as a teenager, Olivia Baughn as a young girl) - Courtney's best friend back in California.
- Maggie Kramer (portrayed by Elizabeth Bond) - The mother of Mary Kramer.
- Josh Hamman (portrayed by Christian Adam) - A nerdy student at Blue Valley High School.
- Mrs. Patterson (portrayed by Suehyla El-Attar) - A teacher at Blue Valley High School.
- Denise Zarick (portrayed by Cynthia Evans) - The wife of William Zarick and the mother of Joey Zarick.
- Bobbie Burman (portrayed by Lesa Wilson) - The wife of Dragon King and the stepmother of Cindy. In season two, Bobbie is killed by Eclipso when he controls Cindy's body.
- Mercedes (portrayed by C.C. Castillo) - The housekeeper of the King family.
- Mr. Levine (portrayed by Nick Basta) - A math teacher at Blue Valley High School.
- Juan Montez (portrayed by Wilmer Calderon) - Yolanda's estranged father. During Yolanda's high school days, Maria supported Yolanda in her run for school president until Cindy Burman leaked topless photos of Yolanda that Henry King Jr. asked for. This incident resulted in her parents revealing their true abusive natures and their relationship with Yolanda worsening. Consumed by this incident, Maria and Juan grounded Yolanda.
- Alex Montez (portrayed by Jonathan Blanco) - Yolanda's younger cousin and the nephew of Maria and Juan.
- Matt Harris (portrayed by Adam Aalderks) - The brother of Rex Tyler's wife Wendi and Rick Tyler's maternal uncle. He assumes guardianship of Rick after Rex and Wendi are killed by the ISA and developed an abusive relationship with him. In season three, it is revealed that Matt has left Blue Valley for unknown reasons.
- Sam Kurtis (portrayed by Geoff Stults) - Courtney's father and Barbara's ex-boyfriend who attempts to reconnect with Courtney a decade after his disappearance. He resurfaces ostensibly to reconnect with Courtney, though he secretly attempts to steal her locket and sell it off for money. Her stepfather Pat Dugan realizes Kurtis' true intentions and confronts him, telling him to never return.

=== Introduced in season two ===
- Rebecca McNider (portrayed by Olive Abercrombie) - The daughter of Charles McNider who became one of Eclipso's victims.
- Myra McNider (portrayed by Emily Dunlop) - The wife of Charles McNider.
- Harold Sherman (portrayed by Tywayne Wheatt) - The principal of Blue Valley High School who succeeds Anaya Bowin.
- Maggie Shaw (portrayed by Alicia Witt) - Pat's ex-wife and Mike's mother who tells Ultra-Humanite in Sylvester's body where Pat is. It is also revealed that Pat and Maggie were not together long and Pat did not find out about Mike until after they split up. They shared custody for a while, but Maggie was an addict, to the point that she abandoned him at a shelter. When she was arrested for possession, Pat obtained sole custody without a fight from her. Following the defeat of Icicle and Ultra-Humanite, Pat managed to arrange for Maggie to have some catching up to do with Mike.
- Miss Woods (portrayed by Deborah Bowman) - A teacher at Blue Valley High School.
- Paul Deisinger (portrayed by Randy Havens) - An art teacher at Blue Valley High School. Cindy Burman uses Eclipso to enchant Deisinger into painting until he becomes engulfed by a paint blob. When the JSA investigate, he causes them to see nightmares until Stargirl pulls him out of the paint blob, curing him. Following this, Deisinger undergoes a psych evaluation. In season three, Deisinger returns to work, only to be killed by Lily Mahkent.
- Father Thomas (portrayed by Kenny Alfonso) - A priest at Blue Valley's church.
- Johnny Thunder (portrayed by Ethan Embry) - A member of the original JSA who owned the pen that contained Thunderbolt. He was killed by Brainwave in battle with the Injustice Society. Before dying, Thunder wished for Thunderbolt to find a successor.
- Millie Myers (portrayed by Blaire Erskins) - The foster mother of Artemis Crock.
- Jay Garrick / The Flash (portrayed by John Wesley Shipp) - A member of the original JSA who possesses superhuman speed. He survived the Justice Society's battle with the Injustice Society and resurfaces in the present day to recruit Shade. Shipp also played a version of Jay Garrick in the Arrowverse series The Flash.
- Bruce Gordon (portrayed by Jason Davis) - An archaeologist who found the diamond that Eclipso was in on Diablo Island. After being possessed by Eclipso, Starman kills Gordon and claims the diamond.
- Grumpy Joe (portrayed by Gregory Knowow) - A grouchy patron at Richie's Diner.
- Louise Love (portrayed by Lynne Ashe) - The head nurse at the Helix Institute for Youth Rehabilitation.
- Sonia Sato (portrayed by Kristen Lee) - A civilian of Blue Valley who runs a coffee stand.
- Mister Bones (voiced by Keith David) - The director of the Helix Institute. He has a transparent head that shows his skull and a cyanide touch that manifested at birth.

=== Introduced in season three ===
- Tim T. Tattle (portrayed by Todd Allen Durkin) - The new manager at the American Dream.
- Todd Rice / Obsidian (portrayed by Tim Gabriel as a teenager, Nate Swift as a child) - The son of Alan Scott and the twin brother of Jennie-Lynn Hayden who possesses the ability to manipulate shadows. After having been separated at a young age, Todd grew up separate from her and had a boyfriend named Danny. When his powers first manifested, he told Danny to flee when the police showed up. The police officers brought Todd to the Helix Institute, where special lights were used to keep his powers under control. In the present day, Todd is freed from the Institute and gains control of his powers. Ten years later, Todd is a member of the JSA under the title of Obsidian.
- Danny Matthews (portrayed by Eddie Falshaw) - The boyfriend of Todd Rice. When Todd's powers first manifested, he told Danny to flee when the police arrived.
- Officer Andreyko (portrayed by David E. Collier) - A police officer who is secretly working with the Helix Institute.
- Officer McFarlane (portrayed by Emmett Hunter) - A police officer and Officer Andreyko's partner who is secretly working with the Helix Institute.
- Mr. Dugan (portrayed by G.W. Bailey) - The father of Pat Dugan and the grandfather of Mike Dugan.
- Tao Jones (portrayed by Andi Ju) - A patient at the Helix Institute.
- Kritter - A dog and Tao's companion.
- Penny Dreadful (portrayed by Megan Ashley Brown) - A patient at the Helix Institute.
- Carcharo - A beastly patient at the Healix Institute for Youth Rehabilitation.
- James Rice (portrayed by Bolton Marsh) - The abusive foster father of Todd Rice who disapproved of Todd being gay.
- Emily Swift (portrayed by Arianne Martin) - The sister of Shade.
- Ultra-Humanite (voiced by an uncredited actor in his albino gorilla body, portrayed by Joel McHale in Starman's body) - A mad scientist and old enemy of the Justice Society whose brain was transplanted into the body of an albino gorilla. In the present, after forming an alliance with Icicle and Dragon King, Ultra-Humanite transplants his brain into Sylvester's body and Dragon King's brain into Ultra-Humanite's gorilla body to manipulate Stargirl and her Justice Society into crippling themselves. After revealing this to a bound Pat, Ultra-Humanite starts to bury him alive, but the Justice Society defeat the villains, with S.T.R.I.P.E. leaving the Ultra-Humanite brain damaged and on life support until Sylvester's brain can be found.
- Delores Winters (portrayed by Meredith Garretson) - An actress whose body was briefly used by Ultra-Humanite.
- Carver Colman (portrayed by James Andrew Kientzy) - An actor who presented Winters with an award during an award show.
- King Standish (portrayed by Allen Andrews) - A socialite who tried to make out with Winters after a party and was killed by her.
- Rebecca Sharpe (portrayed by Kelsey Rose Healey) - The daughter of Gambler. Following the defeat of Icicle and Ultra-Humanite, Courtney delivered Gambler's letter to her.
