= Justice Guild of America =

Superhero team

Justice Guild as shown in the Justice League series

The Justice Guild of America is a superhero team featured in the Justice League animated series two-part episode "Legends", an homage to the Golden Age Justice Society of America, and to a degree the Silver Age Justice League of America.

== Appearance in Justice League ==
At the climax of a fight between the Justice League and a giant robot remote-controlled by Lex Luthor, it falls over, threatening to crush Flash, Green Lantern, Hawkgirl, and J'onn J'onzz. In trying to stop the robot, Flash creates a tornado-like vortex just as the robot's energy core explodes, transporting the four heroes to Seaboard City, an idyllic 1950s locale in a parallel Earth.

There, they meet the Justice Guild of America members Tom Turbine, The Streak, the Green Guardsman, Black Siren, Cat Man, and their sidekick/mascot Ray Thompson. They first fight when Green Lantern and Flash stop a robbery by Justice Guild enemy Music Master and the Guild mistakes them for thieves. After the Streak sees Flash save Ray from pieces of a falling building, he realizes the League are not criminals and stops the fight. The Justice Guild were comic book characters on the Justice League's Earth about whom Green Lantern read as a child. He claims without the comics, he may not have his ring today, as the comics taught him what it means to be a hero. J'onn J'onzz hypothesizes that the JGA writers had a subconscious link to their Earth during flashes of "inspiration" which were actually psychic memories of the Justice Guild's exploits. They help the JGA fight a group of their enemies called the Injustice Guild of America, who are based on Golden Age DC supervillains, consisting of Music Master, Sportsman, Sir Swami, and Doctor Blizzard. The IGA engage in a scheme to pull off a series of crimes based on the four elements of earth, air, water, and fire as part of a contest to see which of them can pull off the best crime related to those elements, and by doing so will lead the IGA in their next criminal activity. Doctor Blizzard wins when he takes Flash and Black Siren as hostages, and leads the IGA in robbing the Seaboard City Mint and escaping by blimp. The IGA are defeated by the JL and the IGA and are handed over to the police.

Meanwhile, Hawkgirl discovers graves of the JGA, prompting her and Lantern to probe deeper into inconsistencies found in the "perfect" Seaboard City, such as how some, if not all dangers in it happen to come from out of nowhere. The two question a truck driver about their suspicions, but he only responds to their questions with unspecific answers before driving away. They go to a library, where they discover that all the books on the shelves have blank pages, and going to the basement, they find a brick wall behind the basement door. After Hawkgirl smashes through it, they find a battle-scarred subway tunnel, and an old newspaper dated to the same day as the final Justice Guild comic. The newspaper’s headline reveals that the Justice Guild had been killed in a nuclear war which destroyed Seaboard City forty years prior, causing the Justice Guild comic book to be cancelled on the Justice League's Earth.

Hawkgirl and Lantern show this knowledge to Flash, J'onn and the JGA; shocked, the JGA deny that their existence is nothing more than an illusion. J'onn suspects Ray Thompson is the key to the bizarre state of this reality. Ray denies knowing anything, but J'onn makes a telepathic link with him, causing him to reveal his true form: a disfigured mutant with reality-warping abilities that he used to recreate his destroyed town and resurrect the Justice Guild, making it look like the nuclear war never happened. Angrily, Ray goes on a rampage and tries to kill the JL, while distracting the JGA with a giant red robot. The Guild heroes are initially unsure of what they should do because they know that defeating Ray will undo the illusion and everything in it, including themselves. Ultimately, they decide to stop Ray, reasoning that if they could sacrifice themselves to save their world once, they could do so again. The Guild defeat Ray, overwhelming his powers and ending the illusion; The Streak salutes as he and the Guild happily vanish from as existence as Green Lantern watches, aghast. Ray apologizes for his actions and the city's residents are freed from the illusion, thanking the League for giving them a new future. The League then returns to their own Earth using a space-time machine created by Tom Turbine before his death and powered by Green Lantern's ring.

Back on his own Earth, John Stewart ponders of how much the JGA comics meant to him when he was young and the impact the comics' cancellation in 1962 (the year the actual Guild died) had on him. He remarks to Hawkgirl that the JGA taught him the meaning of the word hero, a commentary on the bright, optimistic Golden and Silver Age's contrast to the Bronze and Modern Age's grittiness and angst.

== Members ==
Among the members of the Justice Guild are:

- The Streak (voiced by David Naughton) — The leader of the Guild who possesses super-speed and wears a football helmet. The Streak resembles the Golden Age Flash. His role as leader of the Justice Guild mirrors the Flash's role as the first chairman of the Justice Society. "The Streak" was later used in the first season of The Flash as an early alias for Barry Allen / The Flash of Earth-1.
- Cat Man (voiced by Stephen Root) — A cat-themed member of the Guild who is a master martial artist. He additionally has a Cat-Cycle and sidecar, and possesses a grappling hook and gauntlets with retractable claws. Cat Man is a combination of Wildcat and Golden Age Batman with the personality of Adam West's version of Batman from the 1960s live-action TV series. His real name, T. Blake, is a homage to the villain Catman (Thomas Blake).
- Green Guardsman (voiced by William Katt) — He wields a power ring which can create a variety of hard-light constructs. Green Guardsman resembles the Golden Age Green Lantern, with his ring not working on anything associated with aluminum being an homage to Alan Scott's ring not working on wood. He also shares his first name, Scott, with Alan Scott's surname.
- Tom Turbine (voiced by Ted McGinley) — The team's brains, he is a genius intellect specializing in nuclear physics and meta-physics. He possesses a button-activated turbine belt and thick metal wristlets and anklets, which grant him flight and super-strength. Tom Turbine is primarily an homage to the Golden Age Atom, possessing a similar color scheme, belt, and profession. His energy-charged punches reference the Atom's Atomic Punch, a power he acquired later into his career. The alliteration of Tom Turbine's name is also an homage to 'Atom Al', the nickname used to bully Al Pratt for his stature and which inspired his Atom moniker. Turbine also shares some of the Golden Age Superman's facial features.
- Black Siren (voiced by Jennifer Hale) — The only female member of the Justice Guild, who takes it upon herself to handle household chores and duties. She is often paired with Cat Man on missions and it is implied that they are also romantically engaged. Black Siren resembles the Golden Age Black Canary. The name "Black Siren" was later used in the fifth and sixth seasons of Arrow as the initial alias of Dinah Laurel Lance of Earth-2.
- Ray Thompson (voiced by Neil Patrick Harris) — The team's mascot. After the Justice Guild died during a nuclear war that destroyed his own world, Ray survived and was mutated by the radioactive fallout, giving him psychic powers that he used to recreate what he had lost. When the Justice Guild find out their existence was a fake, they fight back and overcome Ray's powers, undoing the illusion and everything in it.

== Injustice Guild ==
The Injustice Guild, based on the Injustice Society, is a group of super-villains whose goal is to eliminate the Justice Guild and rule the world. It is unknown if its members survived the war or are simply projections of Ray's mind. Among its members are:

- Sir Swami (voiced by Jeffrey Jones) — The Injustice Guild's leader, a turban-wearing man with powerful magic derived from his magic wand. He is based on the Wizard.
- The Music Master (voiced by Udo Kier) — A member of the Injustice Guild who wields an accordion that emits high-intensity sound waves. He is based on the Fiddler.
- Sportsman (voiced by Michael McKean) — A member of the Injustice Guild who uses sports equipment to commit crimes. He is based on the Sportsmaster.
- Doctor Blizzard (voiced by Corey Burton) — A member of the Injustice Guild. He possesses a special doctor's light-reflector that gives him ice powers. Dr. Blizzard is based on Icicle.

== Development ==
The Justice League staff originally intended to use the Golden Age Justice Society of America, but access to the characters was denied by DC Comics as Paul Levitz felt the story as written disrespected the JSA and the characters' portrayals clashed with the post-Crisis JSA's portrayal in current comics. However, Levitz agreed to a compromise: the producers could change the names and designs just enough to make the team not quite the JSA, but still get the point across. The episode is dedicated to Gardner Fox, who co-created both the JSA and JLA. Fox also wrote the first DC comic to feature the meeting of the Golden and Silver Age universes, "Flash of Two Worlds".
