= Gambler (comics) =

Gambler is the name of three supervillains appearing in American comic books published by DC Comics.

Eric Goins portrays the Steven Sharpe incarnation of Gambler in the television series Stargirl.

== Publication history ==
The Steven Sharpe III version of Gambler first appeared in 1944 in Green Lantern #12 in a story titled "The Gambler" by writer Henry Kuttner and artist Martin Nodell, as a foe of the original Green Lantern. In October 1947, the Gambler was one of the six original members of the Injustice Society, who began battling the Justice Society of America in All Star Comics #37 (Oct. 1947).

The Steven Sharpe V version of Gambler first appeared in New Titans #68 and was created by Karl Kesel, Barbara Kesel and Steve Erwin.

== Fictional character biographies ==
Gambler

Publication information
- Publisher: DC Comics
- First appearance: Green Lantern #12 (June 1944)
- Created by: Henry Kuttner; Martin Nodell

In-story information
- Alter ego: Steven Sharpe III
- Species: Human
- Team affiliations: Black Lantern Corps; Injustice Society
- Abilities: Expert gambler; Skilled with Derringer pistol and throwing knives

=== Steven Sharpe III ===
Steven Sharpe III came from a long line of compulsive gamblers. When he proposed to his girlfriend Helen the day after his high school graduation, she refused unless he could prove he was not a compulsive gambler like his grandfather. She then ran off with a "Pool Hall" Charlie, another gambler, who had just won a fortune on the lottery. Sharpe vowed to become a new person after this day. As luck would have it, an armored truck crashed a few feet away from him. Seeing this as a sign, Sharpe helped himself to all of the money he could get and vowed to take whatever he could from life from that day on. He adopted the name the Gambler in remembrance of his grandfather. For the next few years, Gambler joined a traveling carnival, where he gained his skills with disguises, pistols, and throwing knives.

Sharpe was immediately successful as a criminal. He started off robbing trains and small town banks. Growing bored, he moved East to the big cities. He was spotted in Gotham City by Green Lantern while standing next to his own wanted poster. The Gambler eluded Green Lantern twice using his special Derringer pistol, which could fire ammonia or blackout gas in addition to real bullets. When he emerged again, he had adopted a new identity after his riverboat gambling grandfather: the Gambler. As the Gambler, he earned early fame by pulling off a small town bank robbery against heavy odds. At some point, Sharpe spent time with a carnival, learning a variety of knife throws and make-up techniques to complete his disguises. So effective were his disguises that Sharpe himself claims to have forgotten his original appearance and his age to this day remains unknown. Initially, Sharpe remained in the Mississippi Delta, robbing trains, small town banks and the like. One of the first true costumed criminals, he rapidly became one of the most successful criminals and developed a cult of personality reminiscent of the gangsters of the previous decade.

Gambler is one of the original members of the Injustice Society, which plans to kill the Justice Society and control the United States using an army of escaped convicts. The Gambler succeeds in capturing the Atom, and all the other members save Green Lantern are imprisoned. This group failed miserably due to Green Lantern impersonating the Thinker after faking his death, and Gambler returned to prison.

At one point, Gambler married and had a son. He also had two grandchildren, to whom he imparted much of his criminal knowledge. He travels to Las Vegas and ends up losing all of his money to the Taj Mahal Casino, which he does not know is rigged. This final defeat, coupled with all of the defeats he had suffered at the hands of costumed heroes, was too much for Sharpe, leading him to commit suicide.

In Blackest Night, Gambler is temporarily resurrected as a Black Lantern. In the DC Rebirth relaunch, Gambler appears in flashbacks to the 1940s.

=== Steven Sharpe V ===
After the death of Steven III, Steven Sharpe V succeeds him as the Gambler. While keeping his identity as the Gambler hidden and masquerading as the Joker, he reorganizes the Royal Flush Gang. Under his leadership, the Gang battle the New Titans, but are defeated.

The Gambler allies with Amos Fortune, the Wizard (William Zard), and the second Sportsmaster, and creates a super-powered "fight club" using members of the Justice Society as combatants. The fight club was broken up by Stargirl, Gypsy, and Vixen.

=== Third Gambler ===
In DC Rebirth, an unnamed Gambler was seen trying to rob a bank, only to be thwarted by Simon Baz and Jessica Cruz.

== Powers and abilities ==
Gambler is an expert gambler, strategist, and master of disguise. Despite lacking any real superpowers, his cunning nature and talent for spotting opportunities makes him extremely unpredictable and dangerous.

=== Equipment ===
Gambler is highly skilled with his signature weapon, a derringer pistol he keeps concealed on his person and has been modified to shoot different kinds of gases depending on the situation. He is also highly trained in the use of throwing knives.

== In other media ==
- Steven Sharpe / Gambler appears in Stargirl, portrayed by Eric Goins. This version is a member of the Injustice Society of America (ISA) and the absentee father of Rebecca "Becky" Sharpe. In his civilian identity, Gambler is the CFO of The American Dream, a private firm that works to economically revitalize Blue Valley. In the episode "S.T.R.I.P.E.", Gambler meets with his leader, Icicle, to discuss whether Stargirl is a potential threat to their plans. After assisting Icicle in making preparations, Sharpe helps the ISA enact Project: New America in the episode, "Stars and S.T.R.I.P.E." Though Stargirl's JSA foil their plans, he wipes the ISA's servers and escapes while his teammates are either killed or captured. In the episode "Frenemies – Chapter One: The Murder", Gambler returns to Blue Valley to make amends, but is rebuffed by Pat Dugan and Shade. While writing a letter to Becky, he finds that someone is filming certain locations in Blue Valley. While investigating a camera outside of his trailer, Gambler is killed by the Ultra-Humanite.
- The Steven Sharpe III incarnation of the Gambler appears in All-New Batman: The Brave and the Bold #7.
