= Hazard (DC Comics) =

Publication information
- Publisher: DC Comics
- First appearance: Infinity Inc. #34
- Created by: Roy Thomas

In-story information
- Alter ego: Rebecca Sharpe
- Species: Metahuman
- Team affiliations: Injustice Society
- Abilities: Psionic powers that can alter probability as she wishes

Hazard (Rebecca "Becky" Sharpe) is a fictional character appearing in comic books published by DC Comics. She is the granddaughter of Gambler.

Hazard made her live-action debut on the fourth season of The Flash, portrayed by Sugar Lyn Beard.

== Fictional character biography ==
During the anti-hero mania that was sweeping the U.S. during the events of Legends, Rebecca Sharpe takes the opportunity to avenge the death of her grandfather, Steven Sharpe III alias the Gambler. Rebecca takes the name Hazard and joins the Wizard in his new Injustice Society – which he calls Injustice Unlimited. However, she refuses to allow anyone to be killed, nor would she cause anyone's death in the process. Hazard takes Wildcat and the Tasmanian Devil to Las Vegas and, with their help, financially ruined Mr. Taj, proprietor of the Taj Mahal Casino - it had been the crooked games of the casino which were in part to blame for her grandfather's suicide. The villains return to Calgary to share in the stolen wealth which the Wizard had been gathering, but are thwarted by Hourman and Solomon Grundy.

Only weeks later, Hazard allies with the villains Icicle and Artemis, along with Harlequin (Marcie Cooper). The Harlequin brings in the Dummy and a duped Solomon Grundy. Under the leadership of Dummy, their first goal is to murder the members of Infinity, Inc. so that the world and the criminal underworld would know and fear Injustice Unlimited. Though Hazard had previously voiced an unwillingness to take life, she consents to the murder of the super-powered Infinitors. The first target is Skyman, who is successfully killed by Harlequin. Days later, Hazard joins Harlequin and Dummy to murder Pat Dugan at the Infinity, Inc. HQ. When Pat's young son becomes a collateral target, Hazard uses her powers of probability manipulation to help save their lives – Dummy decides to use Dugan as bait for the rest of the Infinitors instead. After her accomplices are defeated, Hazard voluntarily enters custody for her role in the criminal events.

== Powers and abilities ==
Hazard has psionic powers that she uses in conjunction with special dice to influence probability as she wishes. She can cause good luck or harmful "accidents" to befall someone. The origin of her powers, nature of her dice, and the relationship between them are unknown. In addition, she keeps herself in good physical condition but has no known training in hand-to-hand combat.

== Family ==
- Steven Sharpe III is Rebecca's grandfather and was the original Gambler who battled the original Justice Society in the late 1940s.
- Steven Sharpe V is Rebecca's cousin. He has taken over their grandfather's criminal mantle as the current Gambler.

== Other characters named Hazard ==
- Manuel Cabral: The head of Rainforest Technology who takes up the name Hazard when he leads the Black Ops. He and the Black Ops have clashed with Steel many times.
- Perseus "Percy" Hazard: The grandson of Ulysses Hazard / Gravedigger and leader of Squad K.

== Other versions ==
=== Earth-2 ===
Roger Sharpe of Earth-2 was introduced in "The New 52" and operates in Casablanca under the alias of "Darcy Twain".

== In other media ==
- Rebecca "Becky" Sharpe / Hazard appears in The Flash, portrayed by Sugar Lyn Beard. This version was plagued by bad luck until the Thinker tricks the Flash into exposing her to dark matter. After acquiring the power to create an energy field capable of manipulating probability, she unknowingly expands the field while reaping the benefits of her powers until Harry Wells uses S.T.A.R. Labs' particle accelerator to negate the field, allowing the Flash to arrest her and remand her to Iron Heights Penitentiary. The Thinker transfers his mind into Sharpe's body to further his plans before eventually transferring to the Fiddler's body. Following changes made to the multiverse during the events of the crossover "Crisis on Infinite Earths", Sharpe was resurrected off-screen.
- A young Rebecca "Becky" Sharpe appears in the Stargirl series finale "Frenemies – Chapter Thirteen: The Reckoning", portrayed by Kelsey Rose Healey. This version is the estranged daughter of the Gambler who was put up for adoption when she was two. In the third season premiere "Frenemies – Chapter One: The Murder", the Gambler discovers Becky's existence and writes a letter to her with the intention of making amends until he is killed. Upon discovering the letter, Courtney Whitmore eventually delivers the letter to Becky for him.
