= Gentleman Ghost =

DC Comics supervillain

- Gentleman Ghost as depicted in JSA #84 (June 2006). Art by Luke Ross.

Publication information
- Publisher: DC Comics
- First appearance: Flash Comics #88 (October 1947)
- Created by: Robert Kanigher (writer); Joe Kubert (artist)

In-story information
- Alter ego: James "Jim" Craddock
- Species: Ghost
- Team affiliations: Injustice Society; Secret Society of Super Villains
- Notable aliases: The Ghost "Gentleman Jim"
- Abilities: Flight; Invisibility; Intangibility; Death touch; Supernatural senses; Phantasm manipulation; Teleportation

Gentleman Ghost (James "Jim" Craddock), introduced as Ghost, and also known as Gentleman Jim, is a supervillain appearing in American comic books published by DC Comics. Created by writer Robert Kanigher and artist Joe Kubert, the character first appeared in Flash Comics #88 (October 1947).

Gentleman Ghost has been substantially adapted into media outside comics, including animated television series, films, and video games. He is voiced by Greg Ellis in Batman: The Brave and the Bold, "Weird Al" Yankovic in Teen Titans Go! vs. Teen Titans, Toby Stephens in Batman: Caped Crusader, and Robin Atkin Downes in Justice League Unlimited.

== Fictional character biography ==
=== Earth-Two ===
The original, Earth-Two incarnation of Gentleman Ghost is a human criminal who used special effects, stuntwork, and gadgets to pose as a ghost.

=== Post-Crisis ===
In post-Crisis continuity, James "Jim" Craddock is the illegitimate son of an English aristocrat who abandoned both him and his mother, forcing them into poverty. Craddock grew up to become a notorious highwayman and robber who terrorized England in the 19th century under the name "Gentleman Jim". He journeyed to the United States and encountered the gunslingers Nighthawk and Cinnamon. Nighthawk lynched Craddock after wrongly assuming that he sexually assaulted Cinnamon, but Craddock eludes death to rise again as a ghost.

The Gentleman Ghost learns he must wander Earth until the spirit of his killer moves on to the next plane of existence. Nighthawk and Cinnamon turn out to be the reincarnations of Ancient Egyptian royalty Prince Khufu and Chay-Ara: their souls (due to their exposure to the Thanagarian Nth metal) continuously reincarnate and can never truly die. Both are eventually resurrected as Hawkman and Hawkgirl, and the Gentleman Ghost becomes their recurring nemesis during the 1940s.

Gentleman Ghost later appears as a member of the Injustice Society.

During Infinite Crisis, Gentleman Ghost joins Alexander Luthor Jr.'s Secret Society of Super Villains. He fights Alan Scott and, using his spectral abilities, is able to neutralize Scott by inducing him into a coma.

His origin is explored and altered in the pages of JSA #82-87 (2006). Craddock is now shown to have been born into poverty rather than wealth to neglectful parents, and to have encountered supernatural forces early in his criminal career. After a gypsy prophesies that he will be able to transcend death and return to life fighting and killing his enemies on English soil, his villainous career is put to an end when he is captured and sentenced to death by hanging after his lover betrays him for a reward to the authorities. Returning as a ghost, he battles the JSA, hoping for the prophecy to come true.

Gentleman Ghost is one of the villains sent to retrieve the Get Out of Hell Free card from the Secret Six.

=== The New 52 ===
In 2011, "The New 52" rebooted the DC universe. This version of Craddock was a philanderer and rake who drew the ire of a witch, who cursed him with his abilities but also an endless greed that compelled him to commit criminal acts. He believed the curse would be lifted once the witch died. It was not and he found himself to be immortal and having been turned into a ghost.

=== DC Rebirth ===
In the DC Rebirth relaunch, Gentleman Ghost joins Amanda Waller's Suicide Squad Black to fight Sebastian Faust after he steals several artifacts in A.R.G.U.S. storage.

In "The New Golden Age" storyline, Gentleman Ghost obtains a special sphere that he uses to summon an army of zombies. He fights the Justice Society until Icicle unknowingly attacks the sphere, which summons Surtur. Legionnaire borrows some of Hawkman's lifeforce and revives Gentleman Ghost, causing Surtur to explode and the zombies to disappear.

In the "DC All In" initiative, Gentleman Ghost appears as a member of Scandal Savage's Injustice Society. Gentleman Ghost works with Solomon Grundy and the Demons Three to lure Hawkman and Hawkgirl into a trap. Kid Eternity harnesses Doctor Fate's magic to repel the attackers.

== Powers, abilities, and equipment ==
The Gentleman Ghost of Earth-Two is a con man and thief who relies on various devices to simulate ghost-like capabilities for his criminal capers.

The modern Jim Craddock is a ghost who can become invisible and intangible, teleport, and freeze people with his touch. He is usually shown wearing the suit he was hanged in, along with a top hat and monocle. However, he is vulnerable to Nth Metal, which has anti-magic properties.

== Other versions ==
- An alternate universe version of Gentleman Ghost makes a minor appearance in Kingdom Come #2.
- A heroic Gentleman Ghost from Earth-3 called the Pinkerton Ghost appears in Hawkman (vol. 5) #18 as a member of the Justice Society All-Stars.
- A possible future version of Gentleman Ghost appears in The New Golden Age as a member of Huntress' makeshift Justice Society of America until he is revived and killed by Per Degaton.

== In other media ==
=== Television ===
- Gentleman Ghost appears in The All-New Super Friends Hour episode "The Ghost", voiced by Alan Oppenheimer.
- Gentleman Ghost was briefly considered to appear in The New Batman Adventures. When asked about his potential use in the series, producer and writer Paul Dini stated his appearance would be "likely, if we do more contemporary Batman stories". Ultimately, Gentleman Ghost never appeared in the series.
- Gentleman Ghost appears in Justice League Unlimited, voiced by Robin Atkin Downes. This version is a member of Gorilla Grodd's Secret Society.
- Gentleman Ghost appears in Batman: The Brave and the Bold, voiced by Greg Ellis. This version attempted to obtain immortality by offering ten souls to the demon Asteroth in exchange, which he ultimately succeeds in, only to be cursed by Asteroth, bound to the Earthly plane, and defeated by Sherlock Holmes, Etrigan the Demon, and a time-displaced Batman. Subsequently, Craddock is hanged for his crimes, rises from his grave as Gentleman Ghost, and swears revenge on Batman.
  - Additionally, an unnamed, heroic, alternate reality version of Gentleman Ghost appears in the episode "Deep Cover for Batman!".
- Gentleman Ghost appears in the DC Super Hero Girls two-part episode "#NightmareInGotham", voiced by Fred Tatasciore.
- Gentleman Ghost appears in the Batman: Caped Crusader episode "Night Ride", voiced by Toby Stephens. This version was an 18th-century Loyalist nobleman and wealthy aristocrat who squandered his fortune gambling and turned to crime, becoming a notorious masked highwayman before being caught and hanged. In the present, he returns as a vengeful spirit to terrorize Gotham City until Batman defeats him and traps him in a vial with Papa Midnite's help. Afterwards, Midnite takes possession of the vial.

=== Film ===
- Gentleman Ghost appears in The Lego Batman Movie.
- Gentleman Ghost appears in Teen Titans Go! vs. Teen Titans, voiced by "Weird Al" Yankovic.

=== Video games ===
- Gentleman Ghost appears in Batman: The Brave and the Bold – The Videogame, voiced again by Greg Ellis.
- Gentleman Ghost appears in DC Universe Online, voiced by Jason Brenizer.
- Gentleman Ghost appears as a character summon in Scribblenauts Unmasked: A DC Comics Adventure.
- Gentleman Ghost appears as a playable character in Lego DC Super-Villains, voiced again by Robin Atkin Downes.
- Gentleman Ghost appears in Lego Batman: Legacy of the Dark Knight.

== See also ==
- List of Batman family enemies
