= Thinker (DC Comics) =

DC Comics character

The Thinker is the name of five supervillains appearing in American comic books published by DC Comics.

The first incarnation, Clifford DeVoe, is an enemy of Jay Garrick. The second incarnation, Clifford Carmichael, is an enemy of Firestorm. The third incarnation, Desmond Carter, is an enemy of Batman. The fourth, an A.I. incarnation of the Thinker, is an enemy of the Justice Society of America. An unidentified incarnation of Thinker, introduced in the New 52, is an enemy of the Suicide Squad.

The character has been adapted from the comics into various forms of media, including television series and feature films. DeVoe made his live-action debut in The Flash, portrayed by Neil Sandilands. In the DCEU, Peter Capaldi portrayed original variation Gaius Grieves in The Suicide Squad (2021)

== Publication history ==
The Clifford DeVoe incarnation of Thinker first appeared in All-Flash #12 (Fall 1943) and was created by Gardner Fox and Everett E. Hibbard.

In October 1947, the Thinker was one of the six original members of the Injustice Society, who began battling the Justice Society of America in All Star Comics #37 (Oct 1947).

The Cliff Carmichael incarnation of Thinker first appeared in Firestorm #1 (1978) and was created by Gerry Conway and Al Milgrom.

Conway recounted, "My original notion on Firestorm was to do a book that would be DC's complement to Spider-Man, in a sense. We would have a young adolescent male who gets superpowers and doesn't know quite what to do with them. My flip on it was that rather than being the science geek who was being picked upon by the jock, my hero would actually be the jock who was picked on by the geek, and that was going to be Cliff Carmichael's role."

In The Fury of Firestorm the Nuclear Man #50, the strap on Ronnie Raymond's football helmet is cut, and in the following issues Carmichael is suspected of the crime. Though Conway later said that he must have intended to ultimately reveal someone else as the culprit, John Ostrander took over as the series' writer and had Carmichael confess to cutting the strap. In Firestorm #99, Carmichael became the Thinker as part of a genre-wide trend in which civilian cast members were almost eliminated from superhero comics.

== Fictional character biography ==
=== Clifford DeVoe ===
Thinker
- Clifford DeVoe as the original Thinker, as depicted in Flash Comics #65 (June 1945). Art by Everett E. Hibbard.

Publication information
- Publisher: DC Comics
- First appearance: All-Flash #12 (September 1943)
- Created by: Gardner Fox; Everett E. Hibbard

In-story information
- Alter ego: Clifford DeVoe
- Species: Human
- Team affiliations: Injustice Society; Suicide Squad
- Abilities: Genius-level intellect Technologically derived telekinesis and mind control

Clifford DeVoe is a failed lawyer who bitterly ended his career in 1933. Realizing that many of the criminals he had encountered have the skills but not the brains to rule Gotham City's underworld, he starts a new career as the brain behind small-time villains. As the Thinker, he is defeated by the original Flash/Jay Garrick, his most recurrent foe. DeVoe wields the "Thinking Cap", a metal hat that can project mental force.

The Thinker is a member of the Injustice Society, leading an army of prison escapees like the other members. In Plateau City, the police nab a shabbily dressed man who is trying to shoot the governor. They discover that this man is a dead ringer for the governor and also claims to be the real governor. The Flash arrives on the scene to overhear this, but moves on to confront the hoodlums attacking the city. The Thinker appears on the scene, firing a ray at the Crimson Comet, causing him to gain weight and crash through a roof. Recovering, the Flash speeds over to the governor's mansion, only to overhear the governor ordering all police forces to surrender. Flash enters his office and discovers the governor to be a dummy/machine, which flees through an open door. Flash attempts to warn the police that a phony governor put out the message, but the Thinker shows up and tells the Flash that he is speaking into a dead mic, then snares him with invisible wires.

The Thinker appears as a judge in the 'trial' of the JSA, but is revealed as Green Lantern in disguise, having captured the real Thinker after escaping Brain Wave. This leads to the Injustice Society's defeat. Together with the Fiddler and the Shade, the Thinker is the man behind the decades-long "abduction" of Keystone City and the original Flash. His "suspended animation-time" in Keystone keeps the Thinker young over the years, and he continues his criminal career in modern times.

DeVoe accepts a mission with Task Force X in exchange for a full pardon. Although he is seemingly killed by Weasel during this mission, he turned up alive soon after, only to be dying from cancer due to the cap.

In 2016, DC Comics implemented a relaunch of its books called "DC Rebirth" which restored its continuity to a form much as it was prior to "The New 52" reboot. Thinker is depicted as a former district attorney.

=== Cliff Carmichael ===
Thinker

Publication information
- Publisher: DC Comics
- First appearance: As Cliff Carmichael: Firestorm #1 (March 1978); As the Thinker: Firestorm (vol. 2) #99 (July 1990)
- Created by: Gerry Conway; Al Milgrom

In-story information
- Alter ego: Cliff Carmichael
- Species: Human
- Team affiliations: Suicide Squad; Secret Society of Super Villains
- Abilities: Genius-level intellect Technologically derived telekinesis and mind control

Clifford Carmichael is an intellectual bully and the rival of Ronnie Raymond (one half of Firestorm) at Bradley High and later at Vandemeer University. Cliff viewed Ronnie as a rival due to his popularity. He torments Ronnie throughout his high school career and later at Vandemeer University. It was at Vandemeer that Cliff's pranks turned sinister as he cut the helmet strap on Ronnie's football helmet, hoping to get him injured. Cliff's cousin Hugo Hammer accidentally takes Ronnie's helmet, causing his neck to be broken during a football game.

Wracked with guilt after accidentally paralyzing Hugo, Cliff is admitted into a mental institution. He is used as a test subject for experiments with the original Thinker's Thinking Cap and uses the cap to analyze the device and improve on its design. Implanting microchip versions of the helmet into his brain, Cliff becomes a "cyberpunk maniac" with metahuman powers. As the new Thinker, he is drafted into the Suicide Squad after attempting to kill Amanda Waller. After several missions, he betrays the group for the villainous Cabal.

The Thinker later appears as a foe of Jason Rusch, the second Firestorm. When Killer Frost discovers that the consciousness of Ronnie Raymond still exists within the Firestorm matrix following his death during Identity Crisis, Thinker exploits a new opportunity to antagonize an old foe. Technologically dominating the minds of Multiplex and Typhoon, he battles Firestorm, ultimately destroying Ronnie's consciousness. Jason dissolves the enhancements in the Thinker's brain, leaving him comatose.

In Infinite Crisis, Cliff joins Alexander Luthor Jr.'s Secret Society of Super Villains.

With John Ostrander's revival of the Suicide Squad in a 2007-2008 miniseries, Cliff was once again associated with the Suicide Squad under Amanda Waller's direction. It was revealed that although Firestorm had removed the enhancements in Cliff's brain, he made a full recovery and continued to serve as a technical support staffer and lackey to Waller in her operations of the Squad. Cliff betrays the Squad under the direction of the General, but is shot and killed by King Faraday. Cliff is resurrected following The New 52 continuity reboot.

=== Des Connor ===
Thinker

Publication information
- Publisher: DC Comics
- First appearance: Batman: Shadow of the Bat #67 (October 1997)
- Created by: Alan Grant; Norm Breyfogle

In-story information
- Alter ego: Desmond Connor
- Species: Human
- Abilities: Telepathy; Fear projection

Des Connor was a villain who also used the name "the Thinker" and faced Batman in Gotham City. Possessing telepathic abilities enabling him to amplify the fears of others, Connor began a partnership with hypnotist Marlon Dall. Their combined illusions caused the city's most prominent citizens to commit various criminal acts which they used as a distraction for their own heist. The Thinker is swiftly beaten by Batman, who is immune to his powers.

=== Artificial intelligence ===
Thinker

Publication information
- Publisher: DC Comics
- First appearance: JSA #9 (April 2000)
- Created by: David S. Goyer; Geoff Johns; Stephen Sadowski

In-story information
- Species: Artificial intelligence
- Team affiliations: Injustice Society; Secret Society of Super Villains; Legion of Zoom; Checkmate
- Notable aliases: White King's Bishop
- Abilities: Genius-level intellect Mechanokinesis; Holographic projection Intangibility; Laser emission

When the re-formed JSA moves into the New York City building formerly owned by Wesley Dodds, Mister Terrific designs a computer system based on the original Thinker's "Thinking Cap" technology and modeled after his brain patterns. The system gains an artificial intelligence and a holographic body. As the Thinker, the A.I. joins the Injustice Society, providing the villains with information about the JSA members and turning the heroes' headquarters against them. The Thinker is defeated by the Star-Spangled Kid and disappears into cyberspace. The Thinker has since appeared briefly in some other books, such as JSA Classified #5, joining the Injustice Society alongside former teammates.

In the series Checkmate, Mister Terrific succeeds Alan Scott to become the second White King of Checkmate. He repairs the A.I. Thinker's corruption by creating preventative failsafes within his intelligence and promotes him to become the second White King's Bishop.

In DC Rebirth, the Thinker appears as a member of the Legion of Zoom.

=== Unnamed version ===
Thinker
- The unidentified Thinker in Suicide Squad (vol. 4) #25 (January 2014). Art by Patrick Zircher.

Publication information
- Publisher: DC Comics
- First appearance: Suicide Squad (vol. 4) #24 (December 2013)
- Created by: Matt Kindt; Patrick Zircher

In-story information
- Species: Human cyborg
- Abilities: Superintelligence

During the 2013–2014 Forever Evil storyline, which took place during "The New 52" era, an unidentified Thinker uses his intellect to predict the arrival of the Crime Syndicate of America and is incarcerated in Belle Reve. Thinker's brain drains energy from the rest of his body and prematurely ages him. When the Crime Syndicate arrive, Thinker is among the villains who swear allegiance to them, intending to claim the body of OMAC (Kevin Kho) for himself. He succeeds, only for Kho to reclaim his body. As Thinker's original body is nowhere to be found, Amanda Waller suspects that Thinker is alive.

== Powers and abilities ==
The Clifford DeVoe version of Thinker possesses genius-level intellect and is an expert at law.

The Clifford Carmichael version of Thinker possesses genius-level intellect.

The Des Connor version of Thinker possesses telepathy.

The A.I. Thinker possesses genius-level intellect due to it being a copy of DeVoe's conscious and mechanokinesis where he can hack and assimilate a human's grey matter into it. It can also project itself as a hologram while possessing photokinesis, intangibility, and lasers emission.

=== Equipment ===
Clifford DeVoe used an invention called the Thinking Cap, which gave him the abilities of telekinesis and mind control. It was later reverse-engineered by Clifford Carmichael, who placed micro-disks into his brain.

== In other media ==
=== Television ===
Neil Sandilands as Clifford DeVoe / The Thinker in The Flash

- The Clifford DeVoe incarnation of the Thinker makes non-speaking appearances in Justice League Unlimited as a member of the Secret Society and the Rogues.
- The Clifford DeVoe incarnation of the Thinker makes a non-speaking appearance in the Batman: The Brave and the Bold episode "Sword of the Atom!".
- The Clifford DeVoe incarnation of the Thinker appears in the fourth season of The Flash, portrayed by Neil Sandilands. This version is a South African university professor who, with help from his engineer wife Marlize DeVoe, developed the "Thinking Cap" to increase his intelligence, only to become a metahuman with gifted intelligence and an advanced form of ALS. In an attempt to cure himself and remove technology from the world, Clifford became a hoverchair-using cyborg and tricked the Flash into helping him utilize 12 metahumans so he can steal their powers, give himself a new body, and counter the Flash and his allies. The speedster eventually succeeds in foiling Clifford's plans, but his "Enlightenment" satellite would go on to create more new metahumans and meta-technology that empowered individuals such as Cicada.
- The Clifford DeVoe incarnation of the Thinker, based on his Golden Age counterpart, makes a non-speaking cameo appearance in the Stargirl episode "Summer School: Chapter One" in a photograph.
- The unidentified incarnation of the Thinker, based on both Clifford DeVoe and Gaius Grieves (see below), appears in Suicide Squad Isekai, voiced by Hōchū Ōtsuka in the original Japanese version and by Jay Hickman in the English dub. This version is a rogue member of the Suicide Squad. After escaping to another world, he joins forces with fellow rogue squad-mates, the Enchantress, the Ratcatcher, and Killer Croc as well as the Joker, to serve the Undead King and brainwash a population of elves, only to be defeated by Harley Quinn and decapitated by the Joker, who steals his head and Thinking Cap to spread chaos.

=== Film ===
A variant of the unidentified version of the Thinker, Dr. Gaius Grieves, appears in The Suicide Squad, portrayed by Peter Capaldi. This version is a Scottish, sociopathic metahuman geneticist who studied and experimented on Starro as part of Project Starfish. Grieves is captured by the Suicide Squad, whom Amanda Waller sent to destroy Project Starfish and bury its U.S. ties, and forced to help them infiltrate Jötunheim until they accidentally release Starro, who kills Grieves in retaliation for experimenting on it.
