= Cicada (character) =

DC Comics supervillain

- David Hersch as Cicada. Art by Sean Phillips.

Publication information
- Publisher: DC Comics
- First appearance: The Flash (vol. 2) #171 (April 2001)
- Created by: Geoff Johns; Scott Kolins

In-story information
- Alter ego: David Hersch
- Species: Metahuman
- Team affiliations: Secret Society of Super Villains
- Abilities: Energy stealing; Regeneration; Immortality

Cicada (David Hersch) is a supervillain appearing in American comic books published by DC Comics.

Two incarnations of Cicada appeared in the fifth season of The Flash, portrayed by Chris Klein and Sarah Carter.

== Publication history ==
The character first appeared in The Flash (vol. 2) #171 (April 2001), created by Geoff Johns and Scott Kolins.

== Fictional character biography ==
Born in 1890, David Hersch is a former architect and preacher who has paranoid outbursts that cause him to physically abuse his wife Elizabeth. After murdering Elizabeth, Hersch is overcome with regret and attempts to kill himself when he is struck by lightning. Hersch gains the ability to absorb the life force of others, making him nigh-immortal. The lightning bolt gives Hersch a vision of Elizabeth eventually being resurrected; in response, he founds a cult and assumes the name Cicada, preparing for his wife's resurrection.

Cicada works with Magenta and manages to kidnap the Flash. He resurrects Elizabeth by stealing life energy from the Flash and many others, but denies having killed Elizabeth in the past and proceeds to kill her again. He is stopped by the Flash and Jared Morillo.

During the "Infinite Crisis" storyline, Cicada joins Alexander Luthor Jr.'s Secret Society of Super-Villains. In "Salvation Run", Cicada appears as one of many villains exiled to the planet Cygnus 4019.

== Powers and abilities ==
Cicada has the ability to steal the life-force of other living beings and use it to prolong his own life and regenerate physical damage. Cicada is an immortal and cannot die.

=== Equipment ===
David Hersch carries two hilted blades capable of absorbing the life force of its victims and resurrecting the dead.

== In other media ==
Chris Klein as Orlin Dwyer (top) and Sarah Carter as Grace Gibbons (bottom), the two incarnations of Cicada in The Flash.

Multiple incarnations of Cicada appear in the fifth season of The Flash:

- Chris Klein portrays Orlin Dwyer, a lower middle-class individual who gains super-strength and a telekinetically controlled lightning-shaped dagger that is able to nullify most metahuman powers after being struck by a fragment of the Thinker's exploding satellite. Amidst the same incident, another fragment struck his niece Grace Gibbons (portrayed by Islie Hirvonen), putting her into a coma. As Cicada, Dwyer vowed to exterminate all metahumans, whom he blames for the death of his sister as well as what happened to Grace. Dwyer's vendetta brings him into conflict with the Flash and his allies, but he eventually agrees to take a metahuman cure developed by S.T.A.R. Labs as it could also be used to cure Grace, who also became a metahuman. This experience and the file on Grace's parents' deaths causes him to realize that his anti-metahuman prejudice was excessive and acknowledge that the circumstances suggest an accident rather than a deliberate attack. However, he is killed by a future version of Grace, who had become consumed by her own vendetta.
- Sarah Carter portrays an adult Grace Gibbons, also known as Cicada II. Hailing from a future where metahumans thrived and she acquired similar powers as him along with ergokinesis, she traveled back in time to complete what she believes is still her uncle's mission, having adopted Orlin's hatred of metahumans after overhearing him while in her comatose state. When Orlin reveals his change of heart and tries to get his niece to abandon her plan, Grace kills him and develops a plan to weaponize the meta cure so it would kill metahumans instead. However, the Flash destroys Dwyer's dagger with a mirror gun, erasing Grace's future self from existence while her younger self awakens from her coma, abandons her anti-metahuman feelings, takes the cure, and is placed in foster care.
- Chris Webb portrays David Hersch, the original timeline version of Cicada and someone that the Flash, Green Arrow, Supergirl, and the Legends all failed to catch. Moreover, Hersch exists as Cicada across the multiverse, with Sherloque Wells having captured him on 37 different Earths. After XS inadvertently altered Earth-1's timeline at the end of the fourth season, Dwyer became Cicada instead while Hersch was apprehended by the police for serial bombing.
