= Injustice Society =

Supervillain team

Publication information
- Publisher: DC Comics
- First appearance: All Star Comics #37 (October 1947)
- Created by: Sheldon Mayer; Robert Kanigher

In-story information
- Member(s): See below

The Injustice Society (a.k.a. the Injustice Society of the World) is a group of supervillains in the DC Comics Universe. They are the main antagonists of the Justice Society of America.

The Injustice Society first appears in All Star Comics #37 (October 1947) and was created by Sheldon Mayer and Robert Kanigher. The original group brought together six popular villains from Flash Comics, Green Lantern, and All Star Comics: Thinker, Gambler, Vandal Savage, Wizard, Per Degaton, and Brain Wave.

The Injustice Society appear on the DC Universe and CW show Stargirl as the main antagonists of the first season, with some members also appearing in its second season.

== Fictional team history ==
=== Golden Age ===
==== The Wizard's Injustice Society ====
The initial incarnation of the Injustice Society is founded in the 1940s, led by the Wizard, and consists of Vandal Savage, Per Degaton, the Thinker, the Gambler, and Brain Wave. Fragmenting into individual efforts, the ISW attacks numerous government facilities, with each member of the group being assigned to capture a member of the JSA. After Hawkman, Doctor Mid-Nite, the Flash, and the Atom are captured, Green Lantern arrives in Uthorium Town just as the armed forces are closing in on the criminals who control the city. Suddenly, the town disappears in a flash of light. Green Lantern begins a search for the criminal army when he discovers the town has re-appeared a few miles away, and the felons are looting uthorium from a lab. Green Lantern zooms in for the attack when Brainwave appears and blinds him with uthorium. Green Lantern forms an energy bubble for protection while Brainwave and his men finish their job. Recovering later, Green Lantern discovers a radioactive uthorium trail and follows it, discovering Brainwave inside a glass box. When Green Lantern fires a blast of energy at the box, it reflects off the box and knocks him off a cliff. The rest of the JSA are put on "trial", with Thinker as the judge and the Wizard as prosecutor. The JSA are sentenced to death, but are rescued by Green Lantern, who has survived and disguised himself as the Thinker. The JSA defeat defeated the Injustice Society, with the Wizard being caught by a group of children who idolized the Justice Society called the Junior Justice Society.

==== Second Injustice Society ====
The second incarnation of the Injustice Society is introduced in the late 1940s, formed by Wizard and consisting of Fiddler, Harlequin, Huntress, Icicle, and Sportsmaster. They steal national monuments, hoping the American people will vote for the best crime allowing that person to become the leader, and succeeding in erasing the Society's memories after capturing them by the Sportsmaster knocking them out with one of his bombs. Harlequin turns against the group and Black Canary restores the Justice Society's memories, though a post-hypnotic impulse restores the JSA to their mindless states when they hear fingers snapping, causing them to be recaptured. But their memories are restored again after they are placed in a death chamber, leading to Black Canary becoming a proper member.

=== Silver Age ===
The Injustice Society reforms during the 1970s to try and eliminate the reformed Justice Society in two instances. The first attempt is during the annual JLA/JSA team-ups where the Wizard (leader), alongside Sportsmaster, Huntress, Gambler, Shade, and Icicle hypnotize Cary Bates of Earth-Prime into working alongside them as a villain after he accidentally activates Flash's Cosmic Treadmill and is transported to Earth-Two. Elliot S. Maggin and the JLA find Bates after he travels to Earth-One to ask Justice League members Batman, Aquaman, Green Arrow, Black Canary, Flash, and Hawkman to help him find Bates. The JLA are defeated by the Injustice Society after being tricked into "killing" JSA members Robin, Wonder Woman, Wildcat, Johnny Thunder, Hourman and Doctor Mid-Nite disguised as the Injustice Society after the JSA was defeated by Bates. It took the Spectre to revive the JSA using his Ring of Life and the JLA removing the mental block they received after the JSA's deaths to defeat Bates and the Injustice Society. Bates and Maggin are returned to Earth-Prime, while the Injustice Society are returned to prison on Earth-Two.

The second attempt happens on Earth-Two itself. First, the Fiddler fetches Solomon Grundy and defeats Wildcat and Hawkman, but they are defeated by Superman of Earth-Two and Power Girl.

Vandal Savage tricks the JSA into aiding a false Camelot while Icicle, Thinker, Wizard, and Brainwave capture Wildcat and the Hourman. The Thinker and the Icicle are defeated by Doctor Fate, Hawkman, and Jay Garrick, while the Wizard and Brainwave are defeated by Power Girl and the Star-Spangled Kid. The Wizard leaves the Injustice Society for Earth-One, where he joins the Secret Society of Super-Villains.

Brain Wave captures Green Lantern, Jay Garrick, and Power Girl before being defeated in Power Girl's first solo adventure. The Psycho-Pirate is the final member of the Society after he brainwashes GCPD police commissioner Bruce Wayne into believing the JSA's actions were the result of them going rogue. This leads Wayne to summon via Robin's JSA signaller Wonder Woman, Hourman, and Star-Spangled Kid to fight the so-called rogue JSA members. Doctor Fate uses a spell on Wayne to shatter Psycho-Pirate's hold on him, after which Psycho-Pirate is imprisoned.

=== Post-Crisis ===
==== Injustice Unlimited ====
During the Legends event, the Wizard gathered both old comrades (consisting of Brainwave, Fiddler, Gambler, Harlequin, Per Degaton, Shade, Solomon Grundy, Sportsmaster, Thinker, and Vandal Savage) and new super-criminals (Hazard, the Cameron Mahkent incarnation of Icicle, and Artemis Crock / Tigress) into a new Injustice Society, which he called "Injustice Unlimited". Infinity, Inc. battles Injustice Unlimited, which leads to the apparent death of the Wizard. The team later returns to its original name.

==== Johnny Sorrow's Injustice Society ====
Johnny Sorrow appears in late 1999 as the leader of the new Injustice Society, consisting of Cameron Mahkent / Icicle, Blackbriar Thorn, Count Vertigo, Geomancer, Killer Wasp, and Artemis Crock / Tigress. Together, they storm the headquarters of the Justice Society. Wildcat defeats them all and destroys Blackbriar Thorn, but Sorrow uses the diversion to steal an unknown artifact.

Sorrow returns with a larger version of the Injustice Society, having recruited Black Adam, Shiv, Rival, and the Thinker A.I. The villains distract the JSA while Sorrow summons the King of Tears, an other-dimensional entity. However, the JSA fend off the Society, during which the Rival is killed and Adam defects from the group. The Flash harnesses Adam's speed to send the King of Tears to another dimension by striking him at near-lightspeed.

==== The Wizard's second Injustice Society ====
The demon Legacy (actually Wizard in disguise) forms another version of the Injustice Society in the miniseries JSA All-Stars. The lineup consists of Cameron Mahkent / Icicle, Rival, Shiv, and Artemis Crock / Tigress. The new team again confronts the JSA. Unknown to the JSA, their job was just to attach teleportation discs to the JSA members. Legacy is later killed by the Spectre.

==== Johnny Sorrow and Wizard's Injustice Society ====
The Injustice Society resurfaces again in the series JSA Classified. The soul of the Wizard joined forces with Johnny Sorrow to form a new incarnation of the Injustice Society, consisting of Gentleman Ghost, Cameron Mahkent / Icicle, Rag Doll, Solomon Grundy, the Thinker A.I., and Artemis Crock / Tigress. They are tasked to steal Prometheus' Cosmic Key from JSA headquarters to free the Wizard and Sorrow. Believing that Rag Doll will betray the group, the Wizard sets him up to take the fall. The Injustice Society tries to enlist the Secret Society of Super Villains to help with the caper, which draws the attention of Talia al Ghul. Rag Doll takes the Cosmic Key, as Wizard had predicted, and is killed after activating it. Once Johnny Sorrow is brought back to Earth, he and the Injustice Society teleport to Prometheus' Crooked House. After learning that Tigress and Icicle have fallen in love, Sorrow coerces them into sticking with the group.

A later version of the Injustice Society, consisting of Johnny Sorrow, Artemis Crock / Tigress, Icicle, Wizard, Killer Wasp, Geomancer, and Shiv, plots to kidnap Stargirl.

=== DC Rebirth ===
In 2016, DC Comics implemented a relaunch of its books called "DC Rebirth", which restored its continuity to a form much as it was prior to "The New 52". Hawkman and Hawkgirl recount their time with the Justice Society and a prior encounter with the Injustice Society in the 1940s. This version of the Injustice Society consisted of Per Degaton, Vandal Savage, Wizard, Gambler, Tigress, and Brain Wave. In "The New Golden Age", it is stated that Doctor Elemental and his creation Ro-Bear are former associates of the Injustice Society.

=== DC All In ===
In the "DC All In" initiative, a new incarnation of the Injustice Society appears. It is co-led by Scandal Savage and Wotan and consists of Doctor Elemental, Fog, Gentleman Ghost, Johnny Sorrow, Lady Eve, Red Lantern (Ruby Sokov), Shadow Thief, Solomon Grundy, and their associates: the Kobra cult, the Demons Three, and Qwsp. The group plots to steal the Spear of Destiny and the Helmet of Fate from Khalid Nassour to open the portal to the Subtle Realms and release the Unnamed Ones. Despite the Justice Society's efforts, the Injustice Society retrieve the Spear of Destiny from Blackhawk Island and use it to summon the Unnamed Ones.

Reserve Justice Society members Atom Smasher, Johnny Thunder, Power Girl, and Stargirl arrive to assist the Justice Society, respectively subduing Solomon Grundy, Gentleman Ghost, Fog, and Doctor Elemental. Wildcat takes down Lady Eve and Khalid reclaims the Helmet of Fate to take down Wotan and Johnny Sorrow. With help from the ghosts of the deceased JSA members, Kid Eternity gives Doctor Fate the information needed to defeat the Unnamed Ones as Johnny Thunderbolt restrains Wotan and Sorrow. Afterwards, the Injustice Society are detained.

== Membership ==
=== Original team ===
- Wizard (William Zard) - Leader. An illusionist and powerful sorcerer.
- Brain Wave (Henry King Sr.) - A metahuman with great psionic powers.
- Gambler (Steven Sharpe) - A master of disguise and weapons.
- Per Degaton - A time-traveler with access to advanced technology.
- Thinker (Clifford DeVoe) - A former district attorney and enemy of the Flash (Jay Garrick).
- Vandal Savage - A ruthless Cro-Magnon caveman given immortality from a meteor's gases thousands of years ago.

This formation included the following additional members:

- Fiddler (Isaac Bowin) - A criminal who uses specially-made violins.
- Sportsmaster (Lawrence Crock) - A crook who uses sport-themed weapons, married to the Tigress.
- Tigress (Paula Brooks) - A tiger-themed mercenary, married to the Sportsmaster.
- Icicle (Joar Mahkent) - A scientist who invented a gun that drastically lowers temperature.
- Harlequin (Molly Mayne) - A villainess with hypnotic goggles.

==== Later members ====
- Shade (Richard Swift) - He was an additional member when a third formation formed during a team-up between the Justice Society and the Justice League, but later in the comic Starman (vol. 2), he is shown in a flashback assisting a Golden Age incarnation of the Society. His actual time of joining is unknown, but he was a member during the Golden Age. He had a cane which enabled him to cast darkness.
- Solomon Grundy - A superstrong undead foe of Green Lantern who joined a fourth formation led by the Icicle.

=== Injustice Unlimited members ===
- Wizard - Leader
- Fiddler
- Shade
- Tigress (Artemis Crock) - The daughter of Tigress and Sportsmaster.
- Hazard - The granddaughter of Gambler.
- Icicle (Cameron Mahkent) - The son of Icicle, Cameron Mahkent possesses cryokinetic powers.

==== Later members ====
These members were recruited after the Wizard was believed dead and both the Fiddler and the Shade were imprisoned:

- Dummy - A sentient ventriloquist's dummy and enemy of the Vigilante who became the second leader of Injustice Unlimited.
- Harlequin (Marcie Cooper)
- Solomon Grundy

=== Johnny Sorrow's team ===
Johnny Sorrow's team. Art by Alan Davis.

- Johnny Sorrow - Leader. A former thief whose face kills nearly anyone who looks at it.
- Count Vertigo - A Green Arrow villain who induces vertigo.
- Icicle (Cameron Mahkent)
- Geomancer (Adam Fells) - A geokinetic supervillain.
- Tigress (Artemis Crock)
- Blackbriar Thorn - A druid.
- Killer Wasp - A half-human, half-insect villain who is the son of the Yellow Wasp.

Later recruits included:

- Rival - A foe of the Golden Age Flash who developed a formula to endow himself with speed nearly matching that of the Flash.
- Black Adam - A rogue Marvel Family member with powers from the Egyptian gods. He was sent after Wildcat, but betrayed the team.
- Shiv - Shiv is the daughter of the supervillain Dragon King. She had a grudge against Stargirl.
- Thinker (A.I.) - An artificial intelligence version of the Thinker.

=== Legacy's team ===
- Legacy - Leader. An alias of the Wizard.
- Kestrel - A supervillain created by M'Shulla and Gorrum of the Lords of Chaos to either subvert the Hawk (of the Hawk and the Dove) to the forces of evil or to kill him.
- Rag Doll - A contortionist supervillain.
- Tigress (Artemis Crock)
- Icicle (Cameron Mahkent)
- Solomon Grundy
- Shiv

=== Present formation ===
The fifth version of the Injustice Society, art by Joe Bennett.

The Injustice Society resurfaced again in November 2005 in the pages of JSA Classified, composed of:

- Johnny Sorrow - Leader
- Icicle (Cameron Mahkent)
- Tigress (Artemis Crock)
- Rag Doll (Peter Merkel)
- Thinker (A.I.)
- Solomon Grundy
- Wizard
- Gentleman Ghost - The ghost of a highwayman.

The Injustice Society resurfaced once more, this time in a plot to kidnap Stargirl and to face off against the JSA All Stars. The team was composed of the following members:

- Johnny Sorrow
- Tigress (Artemis Crock)
- Icicle (Cameron Mahkent)
- Wizard
- Killer Wasp
- Geomancer - The unnamed successor of Geomancer, who possesses the same abilities as him.
- Shiv

=== DC Rebirth version ===
- Wizard
- Brain Wave
- Gambler (Steven Sharpe)
- Huntress (Paula Brooks)
- Per Degaton
- Vandal Savage
- Doctor Elemental - A former academic advisor of Jay Garrick whose armor enables him to manipulate the classical elements.
- Ro-Bear - A cyborg bear created by Doctor Elemental.

=== DC All In version ===
- Scandal Savage - Co-Leader and the daughter of Vandal Savage.
- Wotan - Co-Leader. An ancient sorcerer.
- Demons Three - A trio of demons who are associates of the ISA.
- Doctor Elemental
- Fog - An old enemy of Sandman who wears a black version of his outfit.
- Gentleman Ghost
- Johnny Sorrow
- Kobra / Lady Eve - A high-ranking member of the Kobra cult. Some of her soldiers are also working for the ISA. Eve later took on the Kobra name.
- Qwsp - A 5th Dimensional Imp and associate of the ISA who operated as "Light" in the 5th Dimension.
- Red Lantern (Ruby Sokov) - The daughter of the original Red Lantern who joined because she thinks Wotan can help find her father.
- Shadow Thief (Carl Sands) - A criminal whose Shadow Vest enables him to tap into the powers of the Shadowlands.
- Solomon Grundy

== Other versions ==
=== Earth-3 ===
An alternate universe iteration of the Injustice Society from Earth-Three appears in Hawkman (vol. 5) #18, led by Sky Tyrant.

=== JSA: The Golden Age ===
The Injustice Society makes a cameo appearance in JSA: The Golden Age #4, consisting of the Fiddler, the Gambler, the Harlequin, and Psycho-Pirate.

== In other media ==
- A team based on the Injustice Society called the Injustice Guild of America appears in the Justice League episode "Legends", consisting of the Music Master, the Sportsman, Doctor Blizzard, and Sir Swami.
- The Injustice Society of America (ISA) appears in the first season of Stargirl, led by Icicle and consisting of Brainwave, Gambler, Sportsmaster, Tigress, Wizard, Dragon King, and Solomon Grundy, with Fiddler and Shade appearing as former members. In the pilot episode, Brainwave, Gambler, Icicle, Shade, Grundy, Sportsmaster, Tigress, and Wizard fought the Justice Society of America (JSA) and killed most of its members, with Icicle fatally wounding their leader Starman. A decade after their victory, the ISA operate in Blue Valley under their civilian identities while Fiddler's wife Anaya Bowin fills in for him. After Courtney Whitmore finds Starman's Cosmic Staff and forms a new JSA, the ISA take up arms to stop her as well as enact Project: New America to brainwash the Central United States' citizens. However, the new JSA, the Shining Knight, Barbara Whitmore, and Mike Dugan foil their plans, with most of the ISA either being killed, incarcerated, or escaped.
  - In the second season, Cindy Burman and Eclipso form their own offshoot group called Injustice Unlimited, recruiting Sportsmaster and Tigress' daughter Artemis Crock and the Fiddler's son Isaac Bowin to their cause. After failing to recruit Icicle's son Cameron Mahkent, Injustice Unlimited fights Stargirl's JSA. In the process, Stargirl accidentally frees Eclipso from his Black Diamond. He subsequently sends Burman to the Shadowlands and consumes Isaac while Artemis flees.
