= Fiddler (comics) =

- The Fiddler as depicted in Who's Who: The Definitive Directory of the DC Universe #8 (October 1985).<vr/>Art by Sandy Plunkett (penciller) and Joe Rubinstein (inker).

Publication information
- Publisher: DC Comics
- First appearance: All-Flash #32 (December 1947 / January 1948)
- Created by: Robert Kanigher; Lee Elias

In-story information
- Alter ego: Isaac Bowin
- Species: Human
- Team affiliations: Injustice Society; Secret Six; Underground Society; Crime Champions; Black Lantern Corps; Legion of Zoom
- Abilities: Via violin: Mind control Shockwave generation

The Fiddler is a supervillain appearing in American comic books published by DC Comics, primarily as an enemy of the first Flash.

Two female incarnations of the Fiddler appear in The Flash, portrayed by Miranda MacDougall and Magda Apanowicz. Additionally, three different incarnations of Fiddler appeared in the first two seasons of Stargirl, portrayed by Timmy Sherrill, Hina Khan, and Max Frantz.

== Publication history ==
Fiddler first appeared in All-Flash #32 (December 1947/January 1948) and was created by Robert Kanigher and Lee Elias.

Earlier, a character with the same name, though only superficially similar, appeared in multiple Action Comics episodes of the Vigilante (starting with Action Comics #59, April 1943 cover date).

== Fictional character biography ==
=== Pre-Crisis ===
The Fiddler started out as a thief who was arrested in India and sent to jail. While in prison, he met a fakir, charming a snake in his cell, who taught him the "mystic art" of Indian music. For the next five years, he learned the fakir's secret and made a crude violin made of material he could scrounge in the prison. He developed the ability to use his violin to play sounds that could either hypnotize others, shatter objects, or create barriers. After the fakir declared his student had surpassed him, he used the instrument to hypnotize the guards to open their cells and he and the fakir escaped. He then murdered the fakir and the merchant who had him arrested in the first place.

Returning to the United States, the Fiddler battles the Flash (Jay Garrick). Flash foils his plan, which involved replacing Maestro Bowin, his twin brother and a violin virtuoso. The physical similarity between the brothers (who had been separated at birth) leads to Bowin being suspected of the Fiddler's crimes. The Fiddler captures his brother and Flash, but they escapes and the Fiddler apparently committed suicide by diving into a river.

The Fiddler survives his plunge into the river and returns to battle the Flash again a few months later. He refines his appearance, shaving his hair and donning a powdered white wig. After the Flash thwarts a petty theft and arrests most of his gang, the Fiddler schemes to make him retire by making him believe that he is not needed. Jay's wife Joan, regretting her earlier arguments with him, operates in his place, using mirrors to create the illusion that she is moving at superhuman speeds. Nonetheless, the Fiddler resolves to dispose of Joan and ties her to a nearby train track. Jay quickly rescues her and attacks the Fiddler, who falls to his presumed death.

Since then, he continued to plague the Flash again and again. He was a member of the second Injustice Society, who captured the JSA and briefly put them under their control before Harlequin and Black Canary restored their memories.

Later, the Fiddler was part of a trio of criminals that caused the original Flash to come out of retirement. The Fiddler, along with the Shade and the Thinker, were stopped by the first of many team-ups of Earth-One and Earth-Two heroes in "Flash of Two Worlds". Barry Allen, the Earth-One Flash, visits Earth-Two accidentally and encounters Jay Garrick, who exists as a fictional character on Earth-One. Together, the two Flashes stop the villains. This issue led to many other team-ups between Earth-One and Earth-Two heroes and villains. The Fiddler, with the Wizard and Icicle formed the "Crime Champions". With the Earth-One villains Doctor Alchemy, Chronos, and Felix Faust, they try to commit robberies after the Fiddler accidentally discovers a method of traveling between universes.

=== Post-Crisis ===
In post-Crisis continuity, the Fiddler is Isaac Bowin, a member of the Injustice Society and the son of British aristocrats. His early encounters with the Flash are kept in continuity. In John Ostrander's Hawkworld series, it is revealed that the fakir who taught Bowin his hypnotic skills was actually a demon.

In the series Villains United, the Fiddler joins the Secret Six. Disappointed by the Fiddler's performance against H.I.V.E. agents during their first mission, Mockingbird deems him "incompetent" and orders him killed. Deadshot carries out the execution; following Fiddler's death, he is replaced on the team by Catman.

In Blackest Night, Fiddler is among many deceased villains who are reanimated as members of the Black Lantern Corps. He features prominently as a Black Lantern during a short story-arc running through the one-shot revival issue of Suicide Squad, and the following two issues of Secret Six.

=== DC Rebirth ===
Fiddler is resurrected following The New 52 continuity reboot and the DC Rebirth relaunch. He is later seen in Zambia partaking in a card game with Psych, Shrike, and Vortex. When Psych learns that Fiddler has cheated, he is held at gun point. Fiddler, Shrike, and Vortex are subsequently killed by Psych. Eobard Thawne later recruits a past version of Fiddler into the Legion of Zoom.

== Powers and abilities ==
The Fiddler possesses magical abilities that he channels through his violins. The musical vibrations he creates can shatter solid objects, create force-fields and hypnotize others due to the sheer amount of sub-level bass.

He uses violins gimmicked with weapons such as blades and guns. He travels around in his Fiddle Car, which Jay Garrick recognizes by sight.

== Other characters named Fiddler ==
- An unrelated Fiddler with similar abilities was an enemy of Bulletman and Bulletgirl.
- Prior to Isaac Bowin's debut, a man named Benjamin Bowe operated as Fiddler and was an enemy of Vigilante.
- In Hawkworld, Neron transforms guitarist Jack Craig into a version of the Fiddler called the Thrasher.

== In other media ==
=== Television ===
- A character based on the Fiddler called the Music Master appears in the Justice League two-part episode "Legends", voiced by Udo Kier. He is a supervillain from an alternate universe and member of the Injustice Guild.
- The Fiddler makes a non-speaking cameo appearance in the Justice League Unlimited episode "Flash and Substance".
- Two female incarnations of the Fiddler appear in The Flash.
  - The first, a genderbent version of Isaac Bowin named Izzy Bowin (portrayed by Miranda MacDougall), appears in the episode "Subject 9" as a country singer and violinist who the Thinker exposed to dark matter, granting her the ability to fire concussive sonic waves. The Flash and the Elongated Man try to protect her from the Thinker, giving her a fiddle with which she can channel her powers through, but the Thinker steals Izzy's body and powers, killing her in the process.
  - The second incarnation, Andrea Wozzeck (portrayed by Magda Apanowicz), appears in the ninth season as a member of the Red Death's Rogues who can manipulate soundwaves through objects that produce sound, such as her fiddle built from Wayne Enterprises technology.
- The Fiddler and his legacy appears in Stargirl.
  - The original Fiddler appears in a photograph depicted in the episode "S.T.R.I.P.E." that identifies him as a member of the Injustice Society of America (ISA), is referenced in the episode "Hourman and Dr. Mid-Nite" as having been an Irish enemy of the Justice Society of America (JSA), and appears in a flashback in the episode "Shiv", portrayed by an uncredited Timmy Sherrill.
  - In the present, his wife Principal Anaya Bowin (portrayed by Hina Khan) takes over his legacy and role within the ISA before being killed by Sportsmaster and Tigress, with her death being covered up as a hunting accident.
  - Fiddler and Anaya's son Isaac Bowin (portrayed by Max Frantz) is depicted as a young musical prodigy and classmate of Courtney Whitmore. In the second season, Isaac joins Injustice Unlimited before being killed by Eclipso.

=== Miscellaneous ===
- The Fiddler appears in issue #8 of the Justice League Unlimited tie-in comic book series.
- The Fiddler makes a cameo appearance in Batman: The Brave and the Bold #15.

== See also ==
- List of Flash enemies
