= Icicle (comics) =

Comic book character

- Joar Mahkent (top) and Cameron Mahkent (bottom). Respective art by Irwin Hasen and Alan Davis.

Publication information
- Publisher: DC Comics
- First appearance: (Joar): All-American Comics #90 (October 1947) (Cameron): Infinity, Inc. #34 (January 1987)
- Created by: (Joar): Robert Kanigher; Irwin Hasen (Cameron): Roy Thomas; Dann Thomas; Todd McFarlane

In-story information
- Alter ego: (Joar): Dr. Joar Mahkent (Cameron): Cameron Mahkent
- Species: Metahuman
- Team affiliations: (Joar): Injustice Society; Crime Champions (Cameron): The Society; Injustice Society; Injustice League; Suicide Squad; Justice Society of America
- Notable aliases: (Cameron): Icicle Jr.
- Abilities: (Joar): Average athlete and hand-to-hand combatant; cold ray gun; special costume to protect from gun (Cameron): Cold manipulation and generation

Icicle is the name of two supervillains appearing in comic books published by DC Comics: Joar Mahkent and Cameron Mahkent (father and son; to differentiate between the two, the suffixes Senior and Junior are used).

An original incarnation of Icicle named Thomas Snow appears in the fifth season of The Flash, portrayed by Kyle Secor, while the name Cameron Mahkent is used as a pseudonym for a signature. Additionally, both Joar and Cameron Mahkent, with the former renamed Jordan Mahkent, appear in Stargirl, portrayed by Neil Jackson and Hunter Sansone respectively.

== Publication history ==
The Joar Mahkent version of Icicle first appeared in All-American Comics #90 and was created by Robert Kanigher and Irwin Hasen.

The Cameron Mahkent version of Icicle first appeared in Infinity, Inc. #34 and was created by Roy Thomas, Dann Thomas, and Todd McFarlane.

== Fictional character biographies ==
=== Dr. Joar Mahkent ===
Joar Mahkent is a European physicist who travels to the United States to showcase his latest discovery. Upon his arrival, Mahkent's ship is suddenly frozen solid in the Gotham City harbor. After investigating, Green Lantern (Alan Scott) learns that Mahkent has been shot dead while on the ship, apparently the victim of racketeer Lanky Leeds. When the criminal Icicle appears wielding Mahkent's invention, a weapon capable of instantly freezing moisture, Scott assumes him to be Leeds. Scott unmasks Icicle as Mahkent, who had killed Leeds and disguised Leeds' face as his own. While attempting to escape from Scott, Mahkent leaps off a 20-story building and apparently plunges to his death in a river.

Icicle survives his fall into the river and returns to battle Green Lantern, eventually joining the Wizard's second Injustice Society.

Icicle is a founding member of the Crime Champions, along with Wizard and Fiddler, who allied with Chronos, Doctor Alchemy, and Felix Faust from Earth-One.

In the storyline Crisis on Infinite Earths, Icicle is killed while attempting to attack Krona's laboratory.

=== Cameron Mahkent ===
Cameron Mahkent is the son of Joar Mahkent. His father's prolonged exposure to the weapon altered his genetics, causing him to be born a metahuman with innate power over ice. Cameron's skin pigmentation was also affected, making him appear to be albino.

Cameron became the second Icicle shortly before joining the Wizard's Injustice Unlimited. The group overcomes the security at the International Trade Conference in Calgary, with Icicle being tasked with retrieving Solomon Grundy. He successfully retrieves Grundy and takes a hypnotized Icemaiden and Jade to the Arctic Circle. Injustice Unlimited's plan of blackmailing businessmen is interrupted when Hourman (Rick Tyler) frees himself. In the ensuing battle, Cameron escapes.

Weeks later, Injustice Unlimited plots to murder the members of Infinity, Inc. to make a name for themselves. Icicle goes after Brainwave Jr. Believing Brainwave to be dead, Icicle and Injustice Unlimited plan to bring all the remaining Infinitors to Stellar Studios and kill them, a plan defeated only by the unwillingness of Hazard to cooperate and the sudden reappearance of Brainwave and Jade. Icicle nearly kills Brainwave in hand-to-hand combat, but is knocked out by Jade.

In 2011, The New 52 rebooted DC's continuity. The Green Team encounter Icicle on a meteor which he hijacked from businessman Bellachek Temple to give to his client. Icicle attacks the Green Team, but relents after the meteor is destroyed. It is later revealed that Icicle and Temple are in a relationship.

In the series "The New Golden Age", Icicle appears as an inmate at Belle Reve Penitentiary, where he is subdued with heat lamps. He is visited by Jakeem Thunder, Mister Terrific, and Power Girl, who want to offer him a second chance by joining the Justice Society of America. Icicle takes the offer in exchange for being freed from prison. Icicle, along with Harlequin's Son, Red Lantern, and Solomon Grundy, assist the Justice Society in battling Gentleman Ghost. When Icicle attacks the sphere that Gentleman Ghost was using to summon his demon army, he unknowingly unleashes Surtr, for which he is reprimanded by Huntress and Grundy.

=== James and Doyle Christie ===
Joar Mahkent's grandchildren briefly adopt their grandfather's name. James Christie, having adopted Joar's methods, is caught by Doyle Christie who briefly becomes a superhero.

== Other versions ==
An alternate universe version of Cameron Mahkent / Icicle appears in Flashpoint. This version is a member of Deathstroke's pirate crew until he is killed in battle with Jenny Blitz.

== In other media ==
=== Television ===
==== Animation ====
- The Joar Mahkent incarnation of Icicle appears in the Super Friends "Post Super Heroes Create a Villain Contest" cereal commercial.
- Dr. Blizzard, a character based on Icicle, appears in the Justice League episode "Legends", voiced by Corey Burton. He is a supervillain from an alternate universe and member of the Injustice Guild.
- The Cameron and Joar Mahkent incarnations of Icicle appear in Young Justice, respectively voiced by Yuri Lowenthal and James Remar. These versions are members of the Light, with Cameron additionally being a friend of Superboy.
- The Joar Mahkent incarnation of Icicle appears in the Robot Chicken DC Comics Special, voiced by Tom Root. This version is a member of the Legion of Doom.
- The Cameron Mahkent incarnation of Icicle makes a non-speaking appearance in the Harley Quinn episode "Getting Ice Dick, Don't Wait Up" as a member of the "cold boys".

==== Live-action ====
- The Cameron and Joar Mahkent incarnations of Icicle appear in the Smallville two-part episode "Absolute Justice", portrayed by Wes Mack and Gardiner Millar respectively. Years prior, Joar fought the Justice Society of America (JSA) and killed Hawkgirl before Hawkman put him in a vegetative state. In the present, Cameron kills Star-Spangled Kid, Sandman, and Doctor Fate under the orders of Amanda Waller, who later kills him.
- An original incarnation of Icicle appears in the fifth season of The Flash, portrayed by Kyle Secor. This version is Thomas Snow, the father of Caitlin Snow. He previously attempted to cure his and Caitlin's genetic propensity for ALS, giving them both cryokinetic powers. Both Caitlin and Thomas develop split personalities as a result of the experimentation, but Thomas eventually retakes control. When Cicada attacks Caitlin, Thomas sacrifices himself to save her.
- The Joar Mahkent incarnation of Icicle, renamed Jordan Mahkent, appears in Stargirl, portrayed by Neil Jackson. This version is the leader of the Injustice Society of America (ISA) who lost his wife Christine (portrayed by Amanda Lavasanni) to an unspecified illness and is supported in his campaign by his Norwegian-speaking parents Sofus and Lily (portrayed by Jim Franco and Kay Galvan respectively), the latter of whom also shares his powers. Ten years prior to the series, Icicle led the ISA in attacking the Justice Society of America (JSA)'s headquarters; killing several of their members and fatally wounding their leader Starman himself. Over the following decade, he settled down in Blue Valley as a businessman in his civilian identity and founded Blue Valley business, The American Dream. Throughout the first season, Jordan meets with the ISA to discuss the rise of Starman's successor, Stargirl, and her efforts to rebuild the JSA before leading the ISA in enacting "Project: New America", but Stargirl's JSA foil their plans. After sustaining damage while fighting her and S.T.R.I.P.E., Jordan is shattered by Mike Dugan using his father's truck. However, he secretly revived himself in a liquid form, spent the following year reconstituting himself, though he is forced to constantly focus to maintain his physical form, and formed an alliance with the Ultra-Humanite and Dragon King. In the third season, Jordan kills Sportsmaster and Tigress before reuniting with his family, claiming to Stargirl that he has reformed, while his allies cripple her JSA. While fighting the heroes, Lily is killed by a falling car while Jordan is shattered once more by Cameron. Three months later, Jordan reconstitutes himself and flees to Copenhagen, but is killed by Artemis Crock.
  - Cameron Mahkent also appears in the series, portrayed by Hunter Sansone as a teenager and Roger Dale Floyd as a child. This version is a student at Blue Valley High School and classmate of Stargirl who develops cryokinesis late into the first season. In the third season, he enters a relationship with Stargirl until he learns she had a hand in his father's apparent death. Despite this, he attempts to reconcile with her and eventually joins the JSA in defeating Jordan before leaving with Sofus.

=== Film ===
- The Cameron Mahkent incarnation of Icicle was reportedly featured in David S. Goyer's script for the unproduced Escape from Super Max.
- The Cameron Mahkent incarnation of Icicle makes a non-speaking appearance in Superman/Batman: Public Enemies as a member of the "Cold Warriors".
- The Flashpoint incarnation of Cameron Mahkent / Icicle appears in Justice League: The Flashpoint Paradox. This version is killed by Atlantean soldiers during Aquaman's attack on Deathstroke's ship, the Ravager.

=== Video games ===
- The Young Justice incarnation of Cameron Mahkent / Icicle Jr. appears as a boss in Young Justice: Legacy, voiced again by Yuri Lowenthal.
- The Cameron and Joar Mahkent incarnations of Icicle appear as character summons in Scribblenauts Unmasked: A DC Comics Adventure.

=== Miscellaneous ===
- The Joar Mahkent incarnation of Icicle appears in Justice League Adventures #12 as a member of the Cold Warriors.
- The Cameron Mahkent incarnation of Icicle appears in DC Super Friends #16 as a member of the "Ice Pack".
