= Sportsmaster =

DC Comics supervillain

- Lawrence Crock as the original Sportsmaster as depicted in The Brave and the Bold #62 (October 1965). Art by Murphy Anderson

Publication information
- Publisher: DC Comics
- First appearance: All-American Comics #85 (May 1947)
- Created by: John Broome; Irwin Hasen

In-story information
- Alter ego: Lawrence "Crusher" Crock; Victor Gover; Victor (last name unknown)
- Species: Human
- Team affiliations: Injustice Society; Legion of Doom
- Abilities: Master athlete and hand-to-hand combatant; Utilizes sports-themed weapons such as exploding baseballs, flying bases, rocket baseball bats, knockout basketballs, lacrosse snare nets, exploding hockey pucks

Altered in-story information for adaptations to other media
- Team affiliations: Secret Society of Super Villains (Justice League Unlimited), League of Shadows (Young Justice)

The Sportsmaster is the name of several supervillains appearing in American comic books published by DC Comics. The first version, Lawrence "Crusher" Crock, is usually depicted as a criminal who uses sports-themed weapons and gadgets to commit crimes. He is also the husband of Huntress (Paula Brooks) and the father of Artemis Crock.

Crusher / Sportsmaster appeared in Young Justice voiced by Nick Chinlund, and Stargirl portrayed by Neil Hopkins.

== Publication history ==
Lawrence Crock, the original Sportsmaster, first appeared in All-American Comics #85 (May 1947) and was created by writer John Broome and artist Irwin Hasen.

The Victor Gover incarnation of Sportsmaster first appeared in Manhunter #17 (September 1989) and was created by John Ostrander, Kim Yale, and Grant Miehm.

A third Sportsmaster, also named Victor, appeared in JSA Classified #26 (July 2007) and #27 (August 2007) and was created by Frank Tieri and Matt Haley.

== Fictional character biography ==
=== Lawrence "Crusher" Crock ===
The original Sportsmaster is a foe of the original Green Lantern as well as Wildcat. He was first known as Crusher Crock, a frustrated athlete who turns to a life of crime. He was a member of different incarnations of the Injustice Society. He teams up with (and later marries) the Golden Age villainess Huntress. They have a child named Artemis Crock, who became the third Tigress. In his later years he spent time behind bars but at least on one occasion was broken out of prison by his daughter - then a member of Injustice Unlimited.

In Final Crisis, Sportsmaster appears as one of General Immortus' followers. Immortus' latest recruit, the Human Flame, betrays him and kills Sportsmaster. Following his death, Sportsmaster's body is cloned by a secret organization called the Council to act as enforcers.

In The New 52 continuity reboot, Sportsmaster appears as a member of Leviathan.

=== Victor Gover ===
The second Sportsmaster is Victor Gover, an African-American football player who possessed "photographic reflexes". Blacklisted from professional sports after his metahuman abilities are exposed, Gover becomes a criminal and enemy of Manhunter. He later joins the Suicide Squad for one mission during War of the Gods.

Following the events of Zero Hour, the character of Victor Gover was radically altered. Victor (last name unrevealed) is a Caucasian athlete who lacks powers and turned to crime due to an addiction to gambling. Fighting Wildcat, Victor bets on himself as part of a betting parlor based on metahuman fights. Victor then battles a handicapped JSA, who are attempting to ensure the kidnapped Ma Hunkel's safety. After Wildcat frees Hunkel, the JSA quickly route him. Wildcat brutally beats Victor, forcing him to retire and attend Gamblers Anonymous.

=== Sportsmen ===
Sportsman is the name of two characters modeled after the original Sportsmaster.

The Earth-2 version, Marty Baxter, gained his powers from absorbing an anti-proton globe, which enhanced his physical attributes and allowed him to telekinetically manipulate various sports related implements. However, he turns to crime as a result of the globe's effect on the rational functions of his brain. The Smashing Sportsman battles several heroes, including Robin and Wildcat.

The Earth-1 version is Martin Mantle Jr., an athlete whose father forced him to undergo unsafe enhancement treatments. As an adult, Mantle becomes a champion athlete, only to learn his father's procedure altered his body in a way that would eventually kill him. As the Sportsman, he briefly becomes a criminal with Olympian-level physical attributes and specialized equipment of his own design. Mantle battles Batman, who allows him to "win" once he learns that Mantle is dying.

== Powers and abilities ==
Crock uses sporting-themed weapons such as exploding baseballs, flying bases, rocket baseball bats, knockout basketballs, lacrosse snare nets, exploding hockey pucks. Their outfits generally included a baseball cap, catcher's mask, padded jersey, catcher's chestguard, football-style pants, and cleats.

Each of the Sportsmasters and Sportsmen had superb physical attributes on par with Olympic athletes in their prime. As noted above, Victor Gover also had "photographic reflexes".

== Other versions ==
An alternate timeline version of Sportsmaster appears in Flashpoint. This version was incarcerated in Doom prison. He attempts to escape during a prison break, only to be killed by Eel O'Brian.

== In other media ==
=== Television ===
- A character based on Sportsmaster named Sportsman appears in the Justice League episode "Legends", voiced by Michael McKean. He is a supervillain from an alternate universe and member of the Injustice Guild.
- The Lawrence "Crusher" Crock incarnation of Sportsmaster makes non-speaking appearances in Justice League Unlimited. This version is a member of Gorilla Grodd's Secret Society.
- The Lawrence "Crusher" Crock incarnation of Sportsmaster appears in Batman: The Brave and the Bold, voiced by Thomas F. Wilson.
- The Lawrence "Crusher" Crock incarnation of Sportsmaster appears in Young Justice, voiced by Nick Chinlund. This version is the ex-husband of the Huntress, with whom he has two daughters, Artemis Crock and Cheshire. Additionally, he is a former member of Ra's al Ghul's League of Shadows who became the top assassin and enforcer of the Light before he is eventually replaced by Deathstroke.
- The Lawrence "Crusher" Crock incarnation of Sportsmaster appears in Stargirl, portrayed by Neil Hopkins. This version is a member of the Injustice Society of America (ISA) who is later killed by Icicle.

=== Film ===
The Batman: The Brave and the Bold incarnation of Sportsmaster makes a non-speaking cameo appearance in Scooby-Doo! & Batman: The Brave and the Bold.

=== Video games ===
- The Lawrence "Crusher" Crock incarnation of Sportsmaster appears as a character summon in Scribblenauts Unmasked: A DC Comics Adventure.
- The Young Justice incarnation of Lawrence "Crusher" Crock / Sportsmaster appears as a boss in Young Justice: Legacy, voiced again by Nick Chinlund.
