= DC Universe: Justice League Unlimited Fan Collection =

Action figure line by Mattel

- Type: Action figures
- Invented by: DC Comics
- Company: Mattel
- Country: United States
- Availability: 2004–12
- Materials: Plastic
- Features: Justice League; Justice League Unlimited; animated series

DC Universe: Justice League Unlimited Fan Collection is an action figure line based on the Justice League and Justice League Unlimited animated series. Though it was based on the shows, the line continued well beyond it, and was re-branded in 2008, as a Target exclusive (in the US). Mattel announced in February 2011 that the line would come to an end later in the year with the final figures being released on the Mattel website including the final two three-packs, a seven-pack as well as the three exclusive Con three-packs being made available to the public.

== History ==
The line itself has gone through many name changes.

=== Justice League/Justice League Mission Vision ===
The idea for the figures began as DC Direct sculpts by sculptor Karen Palinko, which were later handed over to Mattel. They were then released under the Justice League line. They all sported nearly the same look as the original sculpts. Later on newer sculpts were made for all the heroes (except Hawkgirl) to add articulation and accommodate large accessories. Aquaman was later added, making the total number of heroes eight. Three villains were also produced, Lex Luthor, Ultra-Humanite, and Darkseid.

=== Justice League Unlimited ===
As the show moved onto newer territory, so did the figures. The basic concept was to sell smaller packaged collectible single figures (with repaints) and then a sort of quick-builder's 3-pack featuring three original characters with one or two of the original seven members included. The single figures were packed in with an accessory and a collectible card. The number of villains in the line were still few however, as only Sinestro, Amazo, Bizarro, and Brainiac were released. Justice League Unlimited, released in blue cards, as it is, lasted for two series (as Series 1 and 2). The rarest figure in the line is that of Green Lantern Hal Jordan. 100 copies of the figure were made and then the molds were destroyed. The figures were packaged on a special green and red card and autographed by Bruce Timm. The figures were given as a Christmas gift in 2005 to employees of the animation studio who worked on the show. Mattel has definitively stated, in multiple published reports, that there will be no Green Lantern Hal Jordan figures made available to the general public.

=== DC Superheroes ===
Re-branding the 2003 Batman toy line and creating a new Superman line in DC Superheroes, Mattel decided to take Justice League Unlimited into the new brand as well, effectively creating three sub-brands within one umbrella brand. The new packaging mirrored both Batman and Superman in design. The collectible cards in singles were removed and variants of figures that are not accurate to the show were dropped. This line basically offered original Batman, Superman and Flash for new collectors in original suits with various accessories and certain themed 3-packs such as three collectible Justice Lords packs, two Green Lantern Corps packs and a Martian Manhunter 3-pack with faithful character representations. The number of villains also began to increase to include characters such as Mirror Master, Copperhead, Lex Luthor, Star Sapphire, Volcana, Deadshot, and Joker; however, many of the villain figures (most notably Deadshot, Star Sapphire, and Volcana) suffered shoddy distribution by Mattel, making them among the rarest of the mass-marketed figures.

The yellow carded figures also lasted for two series, before DC Superheroes lines revamped their packaging into new purple cards with DC Comics inspired stars and dashes visible on the packaging. However the sixth series marked the return to non show-accurate repaints in single figure packs. The sixth series also marked the expansion of the Justice League Unlimited line slightly beyond its previous limits within the show, by introducing a more comic-accurate repaint of Bizarro, a Black Canary in fishnet stockings, and a Joker figure with a removable Red Hood mask accessory.

=== DC Universe Fan Collection ===
With the re-branding of DC Superheroes into DC Universe, the JLU line followed suit beginning with series 7. The future of the line was finally announced around the 2008 International Toy Fair in New York City. After most brick and mortar retail outlets abandoned JLU, Mattel and Target partnered up to bring the line out as an in-store exclusive. Outside the US, JLU has had only the one wave of 2009 singles surface at Toys r Us in Canada. These same single pack figures have also been showing up at discount in Big Lots stores throughout the USA.

The line continued with their comic-inspired repaints (such as Black-suit Superman, Classic Batman and Elongated Man), paint corrections (Red Tornado, Booster Gold, Doctor Fate and Zatanna), a continuation of Batman villains (from The New Batman Adventures, such as Bane, Scarecrow, Harley Quinn etc.) and brings to the table new lead characters (such as the Question and Captain Atom) and more background characters (from the Justice League and the Secret Society). By mid-2011, all of the expanded Justice League were made into figures except: Creeper, Crimson Avenger, Doctor Mid-Nite, Gypsy, Johnny Thunder, S.T.R.I.P.E., and Speedy.

== Packaging ==
The line, in its various incarnations, has explored several types of packaging - single, 2-packs, 3-packs, 4-packs (as Justice League Toys "R" Us exclusives), 6-packs (as Target exclusives), and 7-pack (featuring the original members as Toys "R" Us exclusives both in the 3" and 4.5" scales.)

Once it was integrated into the DC Superheroes line, JLU sported redesigned orange packing, and followed suit when its 'sister' brand was redesigned with purple packaging in 2006. Since it was part of the DC Universe re-brand, the packaging was in a form of the DC Universe Classics packaging (including character bios) with animated touches placed on it. Beginning in March 2010, the packing changes to the DC Comics' 75th Anniversary brand.

4-packs have been available at the Mattel Collector site. These are not actual 4-packs per se, but singles that are bundled in four. These were discontinued in 2010 after the Justice Guild release, due to insufficient sales. Mattel continued selling exclusives on their site (though in a different format) starting with Lobo in April 2010.

== Figures - 4.5" ==
The line features three sets of collectible figures, the most popular and voluminous being the 4.5" figures which now has over 70 unique characters, not including repaints. The other two lines are the 3" die-cast line and the 10" rotocast line.

=== Justice League ===
==== Series 1 - 2003 ====
- Batman
- Flash
- Green Lantern
- Superman

==== Series 2 - 2003 ====
- Batman
- Batman (Black Variant)
- Flash
- Green Lantern
- Martian Manhunter
- Superman
- Superman (Dark Uniform)
- Wonder Woman

==== Series 3 ("Attack Armor") - 2003 ====
- Attack Armor Batman
- Attack Armor Green Lantern
- Attack Armor Martian Manhunter
- Attack Armor Superman

==== 2-Pack Action Figures - 2003 ====
- Night Flight Batman & Superman
- Superman vs. Assault Armor Lex Luthor

==== Deluxe Action Figures - 2003 ====
- Crime Bust Batman
- Power Escape Superman
- Superman Twin Talon - Released in Latin America Only
- Wilson dog - Released in America Only

==== Vehicles - 2003 ====
- Batplane
- Javelin-7 with Superman

==== Series 4 ("Mega Armor") - 2003 ====
- Mega Armor Batman
- Mega Armor Flash
- Mega Armor Superman
- Hawkgirl

==== Playsets - 2003 ====
- Justice League Watchtower

==== Series 5 ("Mission Vision") - 2004 ====
- Batman
- Darkseid (Dark Gray Face)
- Darkseid (Light Gray Face)
- Flash
- Green Lantern
- Superman
- Wonder Woman

==== Series 6 ("Mission Vision") - 2004 ====
- Batman
- Flash
- Superman

==== Series 6 ("Mission Vision") Deluxe Action Figures - 2004 ====
- Aqua Sled Batman
- Solar Cannon Superman

==== Series 6 ("Mission Vision") Vehicles - 2004 ====
- Batcycle
- Flashcycle
- Green Lantern Cycle
- Javelin-7 With Flash
- Javelin-7 With Superman

==== Series 7 ("Morph Gear") - 2004 ====
- Batman
- Flash
- Green Lantern
- Superman
- Ultra-Humanite

==== Series 8 ("Cyber Trakkers") - 2004 ====
- Flash
- Green Lantern
- Martian Manhunter
- Superman

==== Series 9 ("Silver Storm") - 2004 ====
- Hawkgirl
- Superman

==== Exclusives - 2004 ====
- NASCAR - Batman
- NASCAR - Flash
- NASCAR - Green Lantern
- NASCAR - Martian Manhunter
- NASCAR - Superman
- NASCAR - Wonder Woman

==== Four Packs - 2004 ====
- Journey to Atlantis - Superman with Scuba Gear, Green Lantern with Scuba Gear, Flash with Scuba Gear, Aquaman
- The Rise of Apokolips - Superman, Green Lantern, Wonder Woman, Darkseid

=== Justice League Unlimited ===
==== Series 1 - 2004 ====
===== Singles =====
- Batman (tech suit w/gas mask)
- Flash (tech suit)
- Martian Manhunter (translucent)
- Superman (tech suit w/kryptonite)
- Wonder Woman (yellow choker/bracelets w/plastic lasso)

===== 3-Packs =====
- Batman, Elongated Man, Hawkgirl
- Superman, Martian Manhunter (translucent), Brainiac
- Flash, Doctor Fate, Green Arrow

==== Series 2 - 2004 ====
===== Singles =====
- Atom
- Flash (damaged uniform)
- Green Lantern (circuit uniform)
- Superman (damaged uniform)

===== 3-Packs =====
- Amazo, Starman, Superman
- Aquaman, Wonder Woman, Batman
- Flash, Green Lantern, Red Tornado

==== Series 3 - Spring 2005 ====
===== Singles =====
- Batman (damaged uniform)
- Brainiac
- Doctor Fate
- Green Arrow
- Hawkgirl (black damaged uniform)

===== 3-Packs =====
- Atom Smasher, Flash, Green Lantern
- Booster Gold, Superman, Martian Manhunter
- Hawk and Dove, Wonder Woman

==== Series 4 - 2005 ====
===== Singles =====
- Amazo (gold)
- Anti-Amazo Flash
- Anti-Amazo Superman
- Starman

===== 3-Packs =====
- Aztek, Superman, Sinestro
- Metamorpho, Batman, Wildcat
- Flash, Hawkgirl, Waverider

==== Series 5 - 2005 ====
===== Singles =====
- Aquaman
- Booster Gold
- Cyber Defenders: Superman
- Cyber Defenders: Batman
- Red Tornado

==== Series 6 - 2005 ====
===== Singles =====
- Atom Smasher
- Dove
- Hawk
- Planet Patrol: Martian Manhunter
- Planet Patrol: Wonder Woman

==== Target Exclusives - 2005 ====
- Batman, Bizarro, Wonder Woman
- Black Canary, Green Arrow, Superman
- Wonder Woman (Planet Patrol), Superman (silver highlights), Brainiac
- Green Lantern, Martian Manhunter, Orion

==== Exclusives - 2005 ====
- Green Lantern: Hal Jordan

==== Vehicles - 2005 ====
- Batcycle
- Flash Cycle
- Green Arrow Cycle

=== DC Superheroes: Justice League Unlimited ===
==== Series 1 - 2006 (Orange Package) ====
===== Singles =====
- Superman (w/Black Mercy)
- Steel
- Aztek
- Flash (w/rotor)
- Supergirl

===== 3-Packs =====
- Green Lantern, Tomar-Re, Kilowog
- Lex Luthor (Injustice Gang jumpsuit), Copperhead, Mirror Master
- Martian Manhunter, J'onn Jonnz, Martian Manhunter (clear)

==== Series 2 - 2006 (Orange Package) ====
===== Singles =====
- Batman (w/ wings)
- Waverider
- Wildcat
- Wonder Woman (w/blue cape)

===== 3-Packs =====
- Justice Lord Superman, Justice Lord Wonder Woman, Justice Lord Batman
- Superman, Doctor Light, Aquaman (w/ cape)
- Doctor Fate, Vixen, Hawkgirl

==== Series 3 - 2006 (Orange Package) ====
===== Singles =====
- Batman
- Superman (w/ super breath)
- Rocket Red
- Metamorpho
- Copperhead

===== 3-Packs =====
- Katma Tui ("The Return" costume), Kyle Rayner, Arkkis Chummuck
- Justice Lord Martian Manhunter, Justice Lord Green Lantern, Justice Lord Flash
- Zatanna, Batman, Shining Knight

==== Series 4 - 2006 (Orange Package) ====
===== Singles =====
- Orion
- Elongated Man
- Flash
- Vigilante

===== 3-Packs =====
- Superman, Wonder Woman, Etrigan
- K-Mart Exclusive 3 Pack: Superman (silver highlights), Supergirl (silver shirt), Steel
- Toys-R-Us Exclusive 3 Pack: Justice Lords Batman, Superman, and Hawkgirl
- Huntress, Atom, Batman

==== 6-Pack ====
- Target Exclusive 6 Pack: Batman, Wonder Woman, Superman, Bizarro, Doomsday, Amazo (clear)

==== San Diego Comic-Con Exclusives ====
- SDCC 2006: Solomon Grundy
- SDCC 2006: Solomon Grundy (Slimed Variant)
- SDCC 2007: Green Lantern, Hawkgirl, The Ray

==== Series 5 - 2007 (Purple Package) ====
===== Singles =====
- Superman
- Huntress
- Flash
- Shade
- Doctor Light

===== Re-Released Singles =====
- Batman
- Elongated Man
- Orion
- Steel
- Supergirl
- Vigilante

===== 3-Packs =====
- Lightray, Amazo, Nemesis
- Batman, Wonder Woman, Superman
- Huntress, Atom, Batman

==== Series 6 - 2007 (Purple Package) ====
===== Singles =====
- Wonder Woman (red sleeves)
- Green Lantern (fluorescent green)
- Shining Knight (w/sword)
- Superman (red stripes)
- Lex Luthor (bright green)

===== 3-Packs =====
- Superman, Doctor Light, Aquaman (with cape)
- Superman, Wonder Woman, Etrigan
- Parasite, Stargirl, Aquaman (w/ two hands)
- Green Arrow, Volcana, Hawk

==== Series 7 - 2007 (Purple Package) ====
===== 3-Packs =====
- Sand, Star Sapphire, Superman
- Deadshot, Big Barda, Martian Manhunter
- Obsidian, Vigilante, Brainiac

==== Series 8 - 2007 (Purple Package) ====
===== Singles =====
- Batman
- Kyle Rayner
- Vixen
- Sinestro

==== Re-Released Singles ====
- Wonder Woman (w/blue cape)

===== 3-Packs =====
- Black Canary, Joker, Batman
- Hawkman, Alt. Flash, Rocket Red
- Hawkman (Light Colored), Alt. Flash, Rocket Red
- Superman (silver highlights), Supergirl (silver shirt), Steel

==== 6-Pack ====
- Target Exclusive 6 Pack:Justice Lord Batman, Justice Lord Wonder Woman, Justice Lord Superman, Bizarro, Doomsday (Lava), Amazo

==== Series 9 - 2007 (Purple Package) ====
===== Singles =====
- Batman
- Blue Devil
- Zatanna
- Mirror Master

===== 3-Packs =====
- Starman, Flash, Doctor Fate
- Justice Lords Batman, Superman, and Hawkgirl

==== Series 10 - 2007 (Purple Package) ====
===== 3-Packs =====
- Ice, Fire (regular version), Green Lantern
- Ice, Fire (regular version), Green Lantern (fluorescent variant)
- Green Arrow, Supergirl, Ultra Humanite
- Mister Miracle, Orion, Darkseid
- Justice Lord Superman, Justice Lord Wonder Woman, Justice Lord Batman
- Superman, Batman, Martian Munhunter

==== Exclusives ====
- Toys "R" Us Exclusive: Original Members Collection
- Target Exclusive 6 Pack: Batman, Flash, Superman, Red Hood Joker, Gorilla Grodd, Lex Luthor (grey jumpsuit)

=== DC Universe: Justice League Unlimited ===
==== San Diego Comic-Con 2008 Exclusive - July 2008 ====
- Giganta Two-Pack (4.75" and 8")

==== Wave One - August 2008 (Orange Package) ====
===== Singles =====
- Superman (black costume)
- Hawkman
- Stargirl
- Kilowog
- Batman (Detective Comics costume)

===== Three-Packs =====
- Green Lantern (fade), Captain Atom, Supergirl
- Wonder Woman, Flash, Question
- Fire (regular version), Green Lantern (fade), Ice

===== Six-Packs =====
- Secret Society
  - Batman
  - Flash
  - Superman
  - Red Hood Joker
  - Gorilla Grodd
  - Lex Luthor
- Attack from Apokolips
  - Mister Miracle
  - Superman
  - Forager
  - Mantis
  - Darkseid
  - Lashina

==== Wave Two - November 2008 (Orange Package) ====
===== Singles =====
- Superman (with Phantom Zone projector)
- Sinestro (Sinestro Corps costume)
- Wonder Woman (with lasso)
- Bizarro (corrected show accurate style)
- Batman (navy blue, with Wonder Pig)

===== Three-Packs =====
- Galatea, Superman, Huntress
- Green Lantern (bald), Captain Atom, Supergirl
- Fire, Green Lantern (bald), Ice

===== Six-Packs =====
- Legends of the League
  - Crimson Fox
  - Superman
  - Deadman
  - B'wana Beast
  - Commander Steel
  - Vibe
- Secret Society II
  - Key
  - Batman (Navy Blue)
  - Silver Banshee
  - Shadow Thief
  - KGBeast
  - Atomic Skull

==== Wave Three - First Quarter 2009 (Orange Package) ====
===== Singles =====
- Green Lantern/John Stewart (classic comic Green Lantern uniform)
- Booster Gold
- Superwoman
- Parasite
- Doctor Fate

===== Three-Packs =====
- Bruce Wayne (old), Batman (Terry McGinnis), Warhawk
- Cheetah, Shade, Lex Luthor (in prison jumpsuit)

==== San Diego Comic-Con 2009 Exclusive - July 2009 ====
- Green Lantern Origins Three-Pack
  - Abin Sur
  - Hal Jordan (flight suit)
  - Sinestro (Green Lantern)

==== Wave Four - Fall 2009 (Orange Package) ====
===== Six-Packs =====
- The League United
  - Mister Terrific
  - Supergirl (adult)
  - Elongated Man (comic costume)
  - Obsidian
  - Superman
  - Hourman
- Mutiny in the Ranks
  - Tala
  - Lex Luthor
  - Psycho-Pirate
  - Doctor Polaris
  - Devil Ray
  - Gentleman Ghost

===== Three-Packs =====
- Batman (Navy Blue), Amanda Waller, General Wade Eiling
- Superman, Blackhawk, Wonder Woman
- Black Vulcan, Apache Chief, Samurai

==== Wave Five - December 2009 (Orange Package) ====
===== Six-Packs =====
- Justice League Eclipsed
  - Superman (w/ eclipsing gem pieces)
  - Eclipso
  - Wonder Woman (w/ eclipsing gem pieces)
  - Hawkgirl (w/ eclipsing gem pieces)
  - Flash
  - Green Lantern (w/ eclipsing gem pieces)
- Attack from Thanagar
  - Paran Dul
  - Hro Talak
  - Lt. Kragger
  - Green Lantern
  - Hawkgirl (Thanagarian soldier)
  - Batman (Navy Blue)

===== Three-Packs =====
- Captain Boomerang, Captain Cold, Flash
- Silver Banshee, Superman (red eyes), Metallo
- Cyborg, Plastic Man, Mister Miracle

==== Wave Six - February 2010 (Orange Package) ====
===== Singles =====
- Firestorm
- Green Lantern/John Stewart (comics appearance)
- Batman (Navy Blue)
- Deadshot
- Batman (black costume)

==== Wave Seven - February 2010 (Orange Package) ====
===== Singles =====
- Green Arrow (w/ Bow and Arrow)
- Batman
- Aquaman (Superman: TAS costume)
- Big Barda (w/ Mega Rod)
- Star Sapphire

==== Wave Eight - May 2010 ====
===== Singles (Anniversary Packaging) =====
- Plastic Man
- Superman (w/ Kandor)
- Brainiac (New Krypton)
- Atom (Ryan Choi)
- Martian Manhunter

===== Three-Packs (Orange Package) =====
- Livewire, Superman, Weather Wizard
- Batgirl, Penguin, Nightwing

==== Wave Nine - July 2010 (Anniversary Packaging) ====
===== Singles =====
- Flash (Barry Allen)
- Mr. Terrific w/ T-spheres
- Superman w/ Starro
- Batman Beyond w/ Batarang
- Power Ring

==== Wave Ten - Fall 2010 (Anniversary Packaging) ====
===== Singles =====
- Ultraman
- Red Tornado
- Captain Atom
- OMAC
- Superman (Blue) *Superman (Red)
- Martian Manhunter (Final Crisis costume)

===== Three-Packs - 2011 =====
- Manhunter Robot, Green Lantern (fade), Manhunter Robot
- Green Lantern (bald), Despero, Katma Tui ("Hearts and Minds" costume)
- Warlord, Supergirl, Deimos
- The Joker (Batman: TAS colors), Batman (Batman: TAS colors), Gray Ghost

==== MattyCollector.com Exclusives ====
===== Four-Packs of Singles =====
- Gotham Criminal Four-Pack (February 15, 2009)
  - Harley Quinn
  - Scarecrow
  - Clock King
  - Bane
- Legion of Superheroes Four-Pack (May 15, 2009)
  - Lightning Lad
  - Cosmic Boy
  - Saturn Girl
  - Brainiac 5
- Marvel Family Four-Pack (August 17, 2009)
  - Shazam
  - Black Adam
  - Mary Marvel
  - Captain Marvel
- Doom Patrol Four-Pack (November 16, 2009)
  - Mento
  - Negative Man
  - Robotman
  - Elasti-Girl
- Justice Guild of America Four-Pack (February 16, 2010)
  - The Streak
  - Tom Turbine
  - Green Guardsman
  - Black Siren

===== Three-Packs =====
- Angle Man, Killer Frost, Firestorm, convention exclusive 3-pack
- Kyle Rayner, Goldface, Evil Star, convention exclusive 3-pack
- Flash, Heat Wave, Mirror Master, convention exclusive 3-pack
- Adam Strange, Animal Man, Starman (blue repaint) (September 15, 2011)
- Golden Age Flash, Golden Age Green Lantern, Golden Age Hawkman (September 15, 2011)

===== Oversized Singles =====
- Lobo (June 15, 2010)
- S.T.R.I.P.E. (July 15, 2011)

===== Two-Packs =====
- 2 Parademons (November 15, 2010)
- Darkseid and Kalibak (December 15, 2010)

===== Seven-Pack =====
- Doctor Mid-Nite, Creeper, Johnny Thunder, Thunderbolt, Gypsy, Crimson Avenger, and Speedy (November 15, 2011)

===== Final release Three-Packs =====
These items were for sale on MattyCollector.com, one per month starting in July 2012

- Mongul, Wonder Woman, Batman (July 16, 2012)
- Future Static, Aquagirl, Micron (August 15, 2012)
- Herafter Superman, Vandal Savage, Batman (dark blue/grey) (September 17, 2012)
- Guy Gardner, Detective Batman, Martian Manhunter (October 15, 2012)
- Blue Beetle (Ted Kord), Booster Gold, Translucent Fire (November 15, 2012)
- Toyman, Doctor Destiny, Firefly (December 17, 2012)
