= DC Superheroes =

Action figure line by Mattel

- DC Superheroes Series 3. Left to right: Mr. Freeze, Robin, Batman, and Azrael
- Type: Action figures
- Invented by: DC Comics
- Company: Mattel
- Country: United States
- Availability: 2006–07
- Materials: Plastic
- Features: DC Universe superheroes

DC Superheroes is a collection of action figures originally produced by Mattel in early 2006. It is divided into three different lines - the Justice League Unlimited toyline, with figures based on the animated Justice League Unlimited series; the S3: Select Sculpt Series, featuring more comic-accurate figures in the 6" scale; and a 12" figure line. The S3 line is further divided into two lines - one featuring Batman, and the other featuring Superman. Series 1 of the S3 line began shipping just after Christmas 2005 to Wal-Mart and began arriving in retailers like Target and Toys "R" Us approximately one month later. The figures have characteristics similar to the competing Marvel Legends line in terms of detailed sculpting, articulation, and including a comic book or diorama with each figure.

== History ==
The line began as a successor to Mattel's Batman toyline. Since Mattel only had the license to Batman and Superman characters at the time (with the exception of the Justice League Unlimited line), only Batman and Superman characters were able to appear in the line. Instead of primarily using variations on a single character, the line focused on secondary characters and villains.

At New York City's Toy Fair in 2006, the first five assortments were announced (though the fourth series was postponed). The entire line (with the exception of Robin and Nightwing) was sculpted by the Four Horsemen Studios. The figures have around twenty-one points of articulation and initially came with a comic book centering on the character it came with, but in 2007 figures came with cardboard dioramas instead.

On June 28, 2007 Mattel's license was extended to include all of the DC Comics characters, including all movies and TV shows past, present and future. At San Diego Comic-Con, Mattel announced they would be re-branding the line into DC Universe Classics. The first series was viewable at SDCC 2007 and was released in January 2008.

== Justice League Unlimited ==
Around the same time the first S3 figures hit shelves, the JLU line had also moved under the brand "DC Superheroes". The packaging is similar to the S3 line: in 2006 they were both orange; in 2007, they both became purple.

== S3 - Select Sculpt Series Figures ==
The S3 line featured only Superman and Batman characters, and although the promise was that the line would focus on villains and secondary characters, in practice the assortments were heavy with variations of the main characters. Early series of figures came with comic books featuring the character they came with, yet due to shipping costs and complications, Mattel switched to cardboard dioramas.

In the past Mattel had expressed interest in trying to make almost every character in the DC Universe. Mattel also said they would continue their Batman and Superman lines, but within the continued DC Universe Classics brand. Characters they expressed interest in, and planned on making in the Batman series were: Poison Ivy, Harley Quinn, a Batman Begins Scarecrow, Ra's al Ghul, Firefly, the Riddler, Talia al Ghul, Mad Hatter, and Black Mask. Harley Quinn and the Riddler were eventually released as part of DC Universe Classics, while Scarecrow was released as part of the Movie Masters line.

=== Series One (Batman) ===
The last series of Mattel's Batman toyline, featuring several new characters, was not released in America; instead, it reached distant areas such as Australia. Three out of four figures (Bat Signal Batman, Bane, and Scarecrow) were retooled (Batman had new paint and a new cape, and a running change on Bane gave him new hands), and shipped to Wal-Marts. The fourth figure of the assortment was Killer Croc, who was previously hard to find and had a new head sculpt and paint application. The only Batman figure that was initially shipped overseas and never re-shipped under the DC Superheroes line was Attack Armor Batman.

Figure	Version	Accessories	Description	Articulation	Re-release
Batman	1st sculpt	Batarang, handcuffs, grapple	Repainted from Mattel 2003 line	19 points	
Killer Croc		Pipe	Repainted from Mattel 2003 line, with new head and no tail	8 points	
Scarecrow		Scythe/pitchfork, bomb	Repainted from Mattel 2003 line	25 points	
Bane			Repainted from Mattel 2003 line	14 points	
Bane		Teddy bear	Same as above figure, but includes teddy bear accessory and resculpted hands	14 points	

=== Series Two (Superman) ===
Series Two featured Superman, Supergirl, Doomsday, Bizarro, and a Superman/Bizarro 2-pack (released exclusively to Target).

Figure	Version	Accessories	Description	Articulation	Re-release
Superman	1st sculpt		Original paint scheme	23 points	Series 5, Target Exclusive Superman/Bizarro 2-pack and Superman/Clark Kent 2-pack
Supergirl	Linda Danvers		Original colors	22 points	
Bizarro		Tire axle	1st paint scheme (bright) with no pupils	23 points	Series 5, Target Exclusive Superman/Bizarro 2-pack
Doomsday			1st paint scheme (original version)	23 points	

=== Series Three (Batman) ===
With Series Three, the S3 line returned to the Batman family, releasing a new Batman, Robin, Azrael, and Mr. Freeze. While Robin and Mr. Freeze shared the same sculpt as their original releases in the Batman toyline, Batman and Azrael were new sculpts released for the first time, though Mr. Freeze featured as much articulation as Batman and Azrael. Series Three was also the first series to include a diorama with each figure instead of a comic book. Although comics would be included again with Series 4 figures, Series Five through Eight would feature dioramas only.

Figure	Version	Accessories	Description	Articulation	Re-release
Batman	2nd sculpt	7 Batarangs	1st paint scheme (blue)	23 points	Target Exclusive Batman/Batgirl 2-pack
Robin	Tim Drake	Hoverboard with firing disc	Rereleased from Mattel 2003 line; 1st paint scheme (red and green)	9 points	Toys "R" Us exclusive Batman/Robin 2-pack
Azrael				25 points	DC Universe Classics
Mr. Freeze		Freeze gun	Rereleased and retooled from Mattel 2003 line	22 points	

=== Series Four (Superman) ===
The second Superman series (fourth series overall) featured Superman (black "S" shield), Lex Luthor, Brainiac, and Darkseid. Two Target-exclusive two-packs were also released, one featuring Superman/Clark Kent, and one featuring Batman/Batgirl (comic-styled Barbara Gordon version).

Figure	Version	Accessories	Description	Articulation	Re-release
Superman	2nd sculpt		Rereleased from Mattel 2003 line	14 points	
Superman	1st sculpt		Repaint of Series 2 version - black and red logo, red eyes	23 points	Series 5
Supergirl	Linda Danvers		Repaint of Series 2 version - black and red logo, black skirt	22 points	Series 5
Lex Luthor	Battle Armor	Gun, Kryptonite	Retooled arms (new forearms) and legs from DCSH Mr. Freeze	22 points	DC Universe Classics
Brainiac			Robot form	27 points	
Darkseid		Mother Box	1st paint scheme (blue)	18 points	

=== Series Five (Superman) ===
This series marks the departure from orange cards to the new purple packs. Sticking with Superman for the next two series, Mattel released Steel, Parasite, Kal-El, Black Suit Superman, and Cyborg Superman (very hard to find) figures, along with repainted versions of Superman, Supergirl, Doomsday, Bizarro, and Darkseid.

Figure	Version	Accessories	Description	Articulation	Re-release
Superman	1st sculpt		Rerelease of Series 2 version	23 points	
Superman	1st sculpt		Rerelease of Series 4 version	23 points	
Supergirl	Linda Danvers		Rerelease of Series 4 version	22 points	
Supergirl	Kara Zor-El		Original paint scheme	20 points	DC Universe Classics
Bizarro		Tire axle	Rerelease of Series 2 version	23 points	
Doomsday			Repaint of Series 2 version - Heat vision reflection	23 points	
Parasite				23 points	
Steel		Hammer	Gray "S" on chest	23 points	
Steel		Hammer	Vac-metallized "S" on chest	23 points	

=== Series Six (Superman) ===
Figure	Version	Accessories	Description	Articulation	Re-release
Black Suit Superman	1st sculpt		Repaint of Series 2 Superman - black and silver suit	23 points	
Cyborg Superman				23 points	DC Universe Classics
Kal-El/Superman	1st sculpt		Repaint of Series 2 version - Metallic color scheme with altered headsculpt	23 points	
Darkseid		Mother Box	Repaint of Series 4 version - 2nd paint scheme (black)	18 points	
Mongul				23 points	DC Universe Classics
Bizarro		"Bizarro #1" nameplate	Repaint of Series 2 version - 2nd paint scheme (dark), nameplates either gray or black	23 points	

=== Series Seven (Batman) ===
A brown version of Man-Bat was originally scheduled for Series Seven, but was dropped. The figure was eventually released as part of DC Universe Classics. A dark tech-suit variant of Mr. Freeze was also to be included but was dropped as well; it was eventually released as a convention exclusive in 2008.

Figure	Version	Accessories	Description	Articulation	Re-release
Camo Bane		Teddy bear	Repaint of Series 1 version - camouflaged suit	14 points	
Knightshadow Batman	2nd sculpt	3 Batarangs	Repaint of Series 3 Batman - black suit with new head	23 points	
Batgirl	Cassandra Cain	Batarang		21 points	
Two-Face	Harvey Dent	Tommy gun		20 points	

=== Series Eight (Batman) ===
Half of this series featured repaints from the Batman toyline.

Figure	Version	Accessories	Description	Articulation	Re-release
Batman	2nd sculpt	3 Batarangs	Repaint of Series 3 version - 2nd paint scheme (black) with different belt	23 points	
Bruce Wayne-to-Batman		Snap-on costume, spotlight	Repainted from Mattel 2003 line		
The Joker		Gas mask, mallet, squirt gun	Repainted from Mattel 2003 line		
Nightwing	Dick Grayson	Baton, shield	Repainted from Mattel 2003 line		
Catwoman		Whip, cat, jewelry, backpack			
Clayface			Bendable arms		DC Universe Classics

=== Target Exclusive 2-packs ===
The orange-carded DC Superheroes S3 series packs were rounded out by 2-packs exclusively released to Target stores.

Figure	Version	Accessories	Description	Articulation	Re-release
Bizarro			Rerelease of Series 2 version	23 points	
Superman	1st sculpt		Rerelease of Series 2 version	23 points	

Figure	Version	Accessories	Description	Articulation	Re-release
Batman	2nd sculpt		Rerelease of Series 3 version	23 points	
Batgirl	Barbara Gordon's second costume	Batarang	Gray Suit	21 points	DC Universe Classics

Figure	Version	Accessories	Description	Articulation	Re-release
Clark Kent		File folder	Blue business suit	20 points	
Superman	1st sculpt		Rerelease of Series 2 version	23 points	

=== Toys "R" Us Exclusives ===
The following figures are repaints of figures in the DC Superheroes line and were included in Toys "R" Us exclusives.

==== Ultimate Batman 5-pack ====
Figure	Version	Accessories	Description	Articulation	Re-release
Batman	1st sculpt		2nd color scheme (black) with yellow bright belt, minimal articulation, and cloth cape; released in a 5-pack with figures from other Batman toylines		

==== Batman/Robin 2-packs ====
A Batman/Nightwing 2-pack was also advertised but was apparently never released.

Figure	Version	Accessories	Description	Articulation	Re-release
Batman	1st sculpt		2nd color scheme (black), with giant wraparound cloth cape		
Robin		Batarang	Rerelease of Series 3 version	9 points	

Figure	Version	Accessories	Description	Articulation	Re-release
Batman	1st sculpt	Batarang	2nd color scheme (black), with giant wraparound cloth cape		
Robin		Batarang	Repaint of Series 3 version - 2nd color scheme (blue/silver)	9 points	

=== Convention exclusives ===
These figures were offered as exclusives during comic conventions in 2007 and 2008.

Figure	Version	Accessories	Description	Articulation	First Release	Re-release
Man-Bat			Repaint of unreleased Man-Bat figure - Albino 2nd paint scheme (white)		SDCC 2007	
Man-Bat			Repaint of unreleased Man-Bat figure - Mid-transformation 3rd paint scheme (clear), light-up eyes		SDCC 2007	
Mr. Freeze		Freeze gun	Repaint of Series 3 version (tech-suit)	22 points	NYCC 2008	

== 12" figures ==
Mattel also released several 12" figures under the DC Superheroes banner. The figures are larger versions of the S3 sculpts. This line continued as part of the DC Universe line.

Figure	Version	Accessories	Description	Articulation	First Release	Re-release
Superman	1st sculpt		12" version of DCSH Series 2 figure			
Batman	2nd sculpt		12" version of DCSH Series 3 figure			
Batman	2nd sculpt		12" version of DCSH Series 8 figure, Toys "R" Us exclusive			
Cyborg Superman			12" version of DCSH Series 6 figure, Toys "R" Us exclusive			

== See also ==
- DC Direct
