= DC Universe All-Stars =

Toy line

- Type: Action figures
- Invented by: DC Comics
- Company: Mattel
- Country: United States
- Availability: 2011–2011
- Materials: Plastic
- Features: DC Universe superheroes

DC Universe All-Stars was a 6-inch action figure toyline released by Mattel beginning in 2011. It is the follow-up to Mattel's previous 6-inch toyline DC Universe Classics, and focuses on characters owned by DC Comics.

== History ==
At the 2011 San Diego Comic-Con, Mattel revealed that they were restarting the DC Universe Classics line at the retail level. The inspiration for this decision were The New 52 changes being made to DC Comics' characters. However many speculate that the line may have been cancelled because it should have started pre-order shipping late 2011 through early 2012. The figures were shown at San Diego Comic-Con in 2012.

== Wave One ==
Mattel revealed the line-up of the first wave on their website in November 2011. After the 2012 Toy Fair, plans changed, and the first wave was altered by excluding a Batman Beyond figure and adding a Red Robin figure with no Collect and Connect figure. The lineup includes:

- Batman (The New 52)
- Red Robin
- Superman (The New 52)
- Superboy-Prime
