= Terror Titans =

Supervillain team from DC Comics

- The cover of DC Comics' Terror Titans trade paperback.

Publication information
- First appearance: Teen Titans (vol. 3) #56 (February 2008)
- Created by: Sean McKeever

In-story information
- Member(s): Clock King; Copperhead; Disruptor; Dreadbolt; Persuader

The Terror Titans are a supervillain group in the DC Comics. They are a mirror group to the Teen Titans. They first appeared as a team in Teen Titans (vol. 3) #56 (February 2008), though Clock King and Dreadbolt appeared in shadow form at the end of #55.

== Publication history ==
The Terror Titans first appeared in Teen Titans #56, the first in Sean McKeever's Terror Titans story arc. Subsequently, a six-part Terror Titans limited series was released October 2008 with Joe Bennett on art duties.

== Fictional team biography ==
The Terror Titans make their first strike as Kid Devil throws an impromptu party at Titans Tower. Dreadbolt, in his civilian identity, plants several surveillance/teleportation/jamming devices around the tower, and later lures Kid Devil into an ambush. Kid Devil is defeated and captured by the Terror Titans. Copperhead, Persuader and Disruptor then infiltrate the tower and attack Ravager. During the battle, a gas line is ruptured, destroying a portion of the tower. Disruptor is then sent to capture Miss Martian, who is thrown into a ring with Kid Devil, whom Clock King had been conditioning into a bestial savage, to be sold to "The Dark Side Club". Clock King attempts to close the deal with "Boss Dark Side", but is refused on the grounds that he promised all the Titans. The Terror Titans return to base, and Ravager, who survived the explosion, follows them. Back at the Tower, Robin triggers a message in one of Clock King's devices. The message tells him to bring all the remaining Titans to an abandoned church. Meanwhile, Eddie and M'gann have been imprisoned within a cell. M'gann discover that Fever has also been captured, and Eddie is brought to the ring to fight Hardrock. When the rest of the Titans arrive at the church, Dreadbolt and Disruptor teleport Wonder Girl and Blue Beetle into the clutches of their teammates. Robin takes on Clock King, only to discover that his foe has the precognitive ability to see 4.6692 seconds into the future. Able to predict the Boy Wonder's every move, Clock King soundly defeats Robin, and prepares to stab him with a knife. Within the Dark Side Club's arena, Eddie, with help from Megan's telepathy, manages to regain his rational mind, and the two escape. As Wonder Girl is being badly beaten by Disruptor and Persuader, Rose saves her, and Blue Beetle, having defeated Dreadbolt and Copperhead, joins them in helping Robin. Ravager attacks Clock King, only to find that her precognitive abilities are in perfect synch with his. Clock King offers her a chance to join him, but she turns him down; as the Titans prepare to attack as one Clock King removes them from his base, and begins planning anew.

Some time later, Clock King takes over the Dark Side Club, planning to use the brainwashed young metahumans for his own plans. Ravager, who had accepted Clock King's offer, helps to train the Terror Titans physically, as Clock King trains them mentally. He has Dreadbolt kill his father and take his name, reunites Persuader with her father, then kills him, and has Copperhead care for an injured combatant named TNTeena, earning her trust, then has him kill her. All this was Clock King's way of conditioning the Terror Titans into ruthless soldiers. It is eventually revealed that Clock King has made the brainwashed metahumans into his own Martyr Militia, and set them on Los Angeles, having them destroy the city simply for his own amusement. Ravager, disgusted, turns against the Terror Titans, and with Miss Martian, who had been posing as one of the combatants, frees the brainwashed metahumans, who turn on the Terror Titans. They come to Clock King for help, but instead he kills Disruptor and leaves the rest at the mercy of the incoming metahumans. Ravager confronts Clock King, and manages to defeat him, although she is unable to keep him from escaping. The three remaining Terror Titans escape from custody two weeks later, and set out to get revenge on Clock King.

== Members ==
The team are taking up the mantle of other older supervillains, as McKeever explains: "What I've done with the Terror Titans is create a team of bad teenagers using the idea of legacy characters":

- Clock King: Leader of the group.
- Dreadbolt: Terry Bolatinsky, son of the supervillain Bolt.
- Copperhead: No relation to the original Copperhead.
- Persuader: Female, possibly an ancestor to the first Persuader. In a form of predestination paradox, she uses weaponry copied from her descendants, who in turn will pattern his atomic axe and his identity after her.
- Disruptor: Daughter of the original energy-disrupting supervillain, later revealed to be a lie.

At the end of Teen Titans (vol. 3) #60 Ravager left the Teen Titans and will have a role in the limited series although, according to McKeever, not necessarily as part of the team: "She won't necessarily be on the Terror Titans team, but she's front and center in the Terror Titans mini-series. It really is like she's sharing the mini-series with the Terror Titans". Eventually, during the series she's convinced by Clock King to take part in the Dark Side Club and train the Terror Titans, not by mind control but out of simple persuasion, but still keeps a hidden agenda, and not everyone in the Terror Titans team trust her fully.

== Collected editions ==
Vol. #	Title	Collected material	Pages	ISBN
Full run	Terror Titans	Terror Titans #1–6	144	1-4012-2294-3
