= Atom Smasher (DC Comics) =

DC Comics character

- Albert Rothstein as Atom Smasher, as depicted in JSA #12 (July 2000). Art by Alan Davis.

Publication information
- Publisher: DC Comics
- First appearance: (As Nuklon): The All-Star Squadron #25 (September 1983) (As Atom Smasher); Kingdom Come #2 (June 1996)
- Created by: Roy Thomas; Jerry Ordway

In-story information
- Alter ego: Albert Julian Rothstein
- Species: Metahuman
- Team affiliations: Suicide Squad; Justice Society of America; Justice League America; The Conglomerate; Infinity, Inc. Justice League
- Partnerships: Atom
- Notable aliases: Nuklon
- Abilities: Mass manipulation; Mass increase; Size alteration; Superhuman strength, stamina, durability, and speed; (Previously): Density control

Albert Julian "Al" Rothstein, also known as Nuklon and Atom Smasher, is a superhero appearing in American comic books published by DC Comics. Atom Smasher is known for his powers of size and density manipulation and superhuman strength.

The character made his live-action debut in The Flash, portrayed by Adam Copeland. He also appears in Black Adam, portrayed by Noah Centineo.

== Publication history ==
Atom Smasher was created by Roy Thomas and Jerry Ordway, and first appeared in The All-Star Squadron #25 (September 1983).

Thomas spoke on Atom Smasher's creation, stating that he was named after Alan Rothstein, a friend of him and his wife Dann Thomas. Albert was made Jewish for the purposes of representation, with the Thomases believing that there were few overtly Jewish superheroes. Albert's growth-based abilities were designed to contrast with the shrinking powers of his godfather, the Atom.

== Fictional character biography ==
=== Origin ===
The godson of Al Pratt, the Golden Age Atom, Albert Rothstein acquired his metahuman powers of super strength and control over his molecular structure, allowing him to alter the size and density of his body, from his grandfather, a reluctant supervillain known as Cyclotron. As Nuklon, Albert was a charter member of Infinity, Inc. and subsequently served in the Justice League. He was considered a dependable, but rather insecure and indecisive superhero while in Infinity, Inc. During this time he had a mohawk haircut. While in the JLA, he forged a strong friendship with fellow former Infinity Inc. teammate Obsidian.

=== The Justice Society ===
Atom Smasher about to crush Kobra.

Albert finally gets his dream and is invited to join the reunited JSA under his new name and identity, Atom Smasher. For years, Atom Smasher cherishes his role in upholding Pratt's legacy and constantly seeks to prove himself worthy to his Golden Age idols – especially when many of them became his teammates in the JSA. He looks up to the elder JSA members, but is himself looked up to by young rookie member Stargirl. When Albert's mother is murdered in a plane crash engineered by the terrorist Kobra, he becomes consumed by vengeance, nearly crushing Kobra in his hands before he is talked down by his teammate Jack Knight, who convinces him that he should not taint the memory of his mother by associating it with Kobra's murder. Not long after the crash, Albert and Metron travel back in time and force the weakened villain Extant into a position where he takes the place of Albert's mother.

=== Black Adam ===
When Black Adam reforms and joins the JSA, he and Atom Smasher develop a rivalry at first as Atom Smasher refuses to believe Adam has reformed. This soon turns to kinship after Adam justifies Atom Smasher's murderous actions towards Extant. Indeed, Adam comments that he thinks of Atom Smasher as a brother. Encouraged by Adam, Atom Smasher grows frustrated with the JSA's moral boundaries, especially when Kobra blackmails authorities into granting his release. Atom Smasher and Adam quit the JSA after Kobra's escape.

Shortly thereafter, the unlikely duo settle each other's personal scores. Adam kills Kobra, while Atom Smasher kills the dictatorial president of Kahndaq, Adam's home country. Atom Smasher leads an invasion of Kahndaq to overthrow its regime. Atom Smasher initially fights against his JSA teammates in Kahndaq before deciding instead to help forge an uneasy truce—Adam and his compatriots can remain in power so long as they never leave the country.

Atom Smasher is put on trial for his actions in Kahndaq and pleads guilty to all charges. Stargirl promises to "be there for him" when he gets out. Whilst in jail, he is approached by the founder of Amanda Waller. In 52, he is seen assembling a new Suicide Squad under Waller's orders, instructed to fight Adam, and, unbeknownst to Atom Smasher himself, push his family to overreact. They succeed, and Osiris is disgraced and exposed for having killed Persuader.

=== Modern-day JSA issues ===
In the Justice Society of America: The Kingdom special, Stargirl recruits Atom Smasher to knock some sense into Damage, who has become an evangelist of sorts for Gog after the cosmic being healed his face. He views Damage (Pratt's son) as a brother figure, since he was brought up by Pratt in the first place.

Atom Smasher finally returns to the JSA during the "Black Adam and Isis" arc printed in Justice Society of America #23–25. Asking the team for a second chance at honoring the memory of Al Pratt, Atom Smasher joins the Justice Society in battling Black Adam and Isis, who have robbed Captain Marvel of his powers. At the conclusion of the story, despite Wildcat's distrust, Atom Smasher is readmitted into the JSA.

In Doomsday Clock, Atom Smasher and the Justice Society are revealed to have been erased from existence by Doctor Manhattan, who altered the timeline to prevent the Justice Society from forming. They are resurrected when Superman convinces Manhattan to undo his actions.

== Powers and abilities ==
Atom Smasher possesses superhuman strength and durability, and can further increase in size and strength at will. His strength and density increase proportionately to whatever size he chooses.

== Other versions ==
Al Rothstein / Atom-Smasher appears in Kingdom Come as a member of Superman's Justice League.

== In other media ==
=== Television ===
Atom Smasher as he appears in Justice League Unlimited.

- Tom Turbine, an original character based on Atom Smasher, Superman, and Al Pratt / Atom, appears in the Justice League episode "Legends", voiced by Ted McGinley.
- Albert Rothstein as Atom Smasher makes non-speaking appearances in Justice League Unlimited as a member of the Justice League.
- A villainous Earth-2 incarnation of Albert Rothstein / Atom Smasher appears in The Flash episode "The Man Who Saved Central City", portrayed by Adam Copeland. While Eobard Thawne listed the Earth-1 version of Rothstein as a casualty of the S.T.A.R. Labs particle accelerator accident, the latter was retroactively stated to have been in Hawaii at the time and thus never acquired powers. The Earth-2 Rothstein kills his Earth-1 counterpart before attempting to do the same to the Flash on Zoom's behalf, having been promised that he will be able to return to his native Earth, only to be defeated and killed by the Flash.

=== Film ===
Albert Rothstein / Atom Smasher appears in Black Adam, portrayed by Noah Centineo. This version is a member of the Justice Society and Al Pratt's nephew.

=== Video games ===
Atom Smasher makes a background appearance in Injustice: Gods Among Us via the Hall of Justice stage.

=== Merchandise ===
- Atom Smasher received an action figure in Mattel's Justice League Unlimited toyline in the summer of 2005.
- In February 2009, Atom Smasher received a Collect-and-Connect figure of the DC Universe Classics line.
- In December 2023, Australia's National Basketball League (NBL) held an event called the "DC Multiverse Round", wherein the teams wore stylized jerseys based on DC Comics characters, which were also made available to the public. Atom Smasher was featured on the Perth Wildcats' jersey.
- In October 2025, McFarlane Toys released a DC Multiverse two-pack featuring Atom Smasher vs. The Spectre, based on their comic book appearances.
