= DC Universe (toyline) =

Toy brand manufactured by Mattel

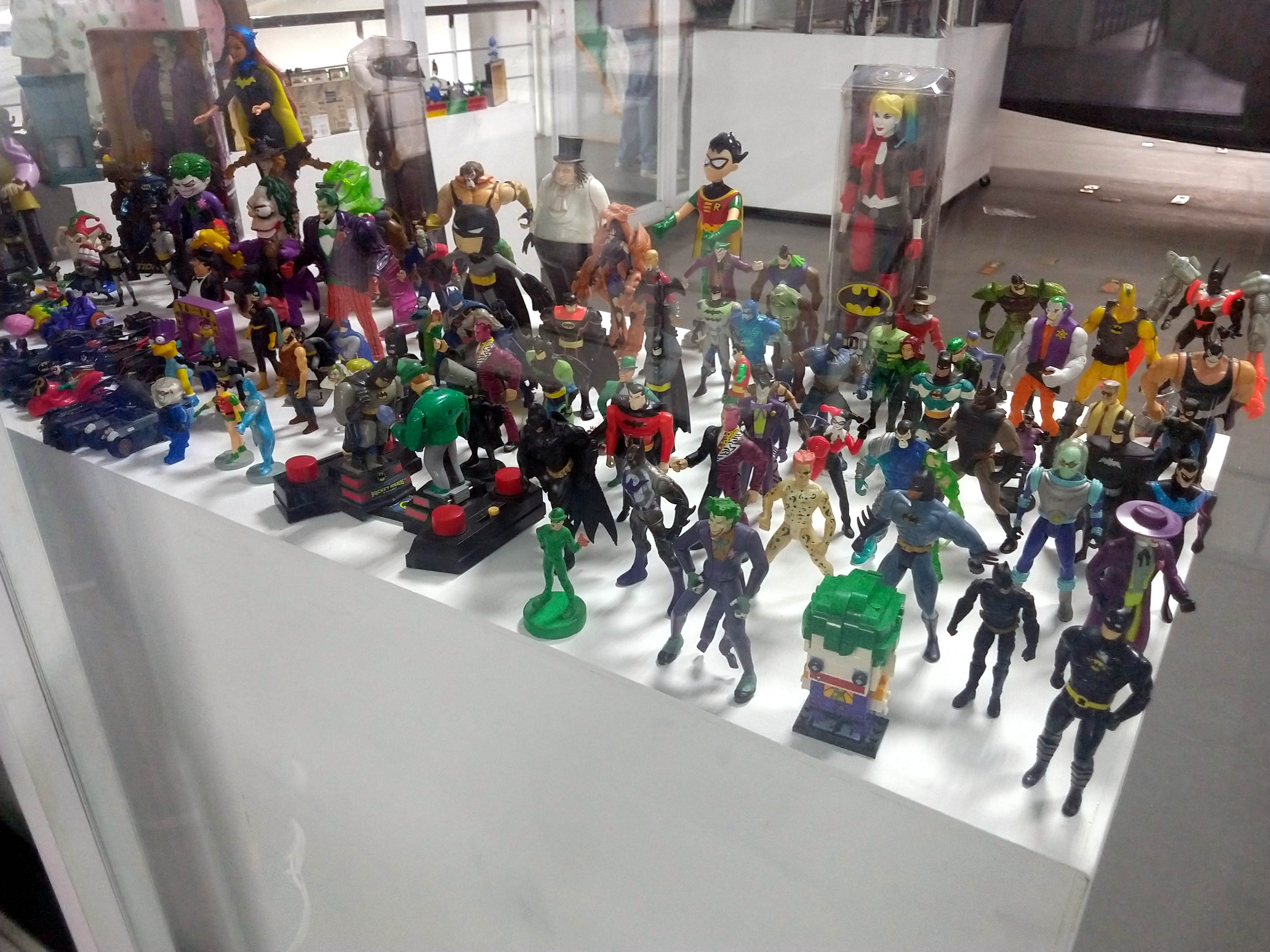
- Several action figures from the DC Universe
- Type: Action figures
- Invented by: DC Comics
- Company: Mattel
- Country: United States
- Availability: 2008–10
- Features: DC Universe

DC Universe is a toy brand manufactured by Mattel. It has five sub-lines – Classics, Fighting Figures, Giants of Justice, Infinite Heroes, and the reintegrated Justice League Unlimited line.

== Sub-lines ==
=== DC Universe Classics ===
This is considered by many to be the main line of the DC Universe re-brand. These are 6-inch scale figures based on characters in the entire DC library, an expansion from previous Mattel lines that only allowed for the use of Batman, and later on, Superman characters. The entire line is sculpted by the Four Horsemen Studios.

=== DC Universe Justice League Unlimited ===
Previously a line itself, then integrated into the DC Superheroes brand, Justice League Unlimited made its debut as a DC Universe product at the 2008 San Diego Comic-Con with its Giganta figure. Now exclusive to Target stores as of summer 2008, Justice League Unlimited is a collector-focused line consisting of single-, three-, and six-packed figures that have appeared in the animated series, as well as non-animated series characters.

=== DC Universe Infinite Heroes ===
This addition to the DC Universe stable takes characters that would appear in the flagship Classics line and puts them at a more collectible 3.75-inch scale. Figures are available as singles and three-packs, with six- and eight-packs available as retailer exclusives. Early statements from Mattel put the total character count for 2008 at around forty-five figures. One of the first six-packs contained characters from the Green Lantern mythos, while another revolves around Gotham City.

Mattel has stated that they are trying to make sure that the characters included in the Infinite Heroes line are not included in the Classics line in the same year to avoid having multiples of the same character on the shelves at once. The figure packages featured clippable Anti-Monitor points, which could be redeemed at the 2009 San Diego Comic-Con for an exclusive Anti-Monitor figure.

Figures typically have limited articulation and minimal accessories. Following the announcement of Hasbro's Marvel Universe line, Mattel announced that the line will get increased articulation (an example is the upcoming Animal Man figure, unveiled at New York Comic Con 2009).

==== Crisis: Series One Singles ====
- Figure 1 – Black Adam
- Figure 2 – Black Hand (modern)
- Figure 3 – Adam Strange (modern)
- Figure 4 – Captain Marvel
- Figure 5 – Guy Gardner
- Figure 6 – Professor Zoom
- Figure 7 – Atom (Ryan Choi)
- Figure 8 – Hush
- Figure 9 – Qwardian Weaponer
- Figure 10 – Manhunter Robot (modern)
- Figure 11 – Batman
- Figure 12 – Power Girl
- Figure 13 – Batwoman (Kate Kane)
- Figure 14 – Question
- Figure 15 – Wildcat
- Figure 16 – Star Sapphire (modern)
- Figure 17 – Doctor Fate (modern)
- Figure 18 – Black Lightning (modern)
- Figure 19 – Spectre (Crispus Allen)
- Figure 20 – Joker
- Figure 21 – Nightwing (modern)
- Figure 22 – Scarecrow
- Figure 23 – Arsenal (unreleased)
- Figure 24 – Batman (black/gray costume)
- Figure 25 – Superman
- Figure 26 – Gotham City S.W.A.T.
- Figure 27 – Wonder Woman
- Figure 28 – Sinestro (classic)
- Figure 29 – Atom (Ray Palmer)
- Figure 30 – Starfire
- Figure 31 – Wonder Girl (Cassie Sandsmark)
- Figure 32 – Black Canary
- Figure 33 – Lex Luthor
- Figure 34 – Batman (blue/gray with yellow oval)
- Figure 35 – Thanagarian Wingman
- Figure 36 – Green Arrow (modern)
- Figure 37 – Hal Jordan
- Figure 38 – Lex Luthor
- Figure 39 – The Flash (Wally West)
- Figure 40 – LexCorp Trooper (blond hair)
- Figure 41 – OMAC #1 (Featured solely in Crisis 3 pack)
- Figure 42 – OMAC #2
- Figure 43 – Supergirl (retro)
- Figure 44 – Dying Supergirl (Battle Damaged Variant)
- Figure 45 – S.W.A.T. Gordon
- Figure 46 – Superman-Prime
- Figure 47 – Flash (Jay Garrick)
- Figure 48 – Flash (Barry Allen)
- Figure 49 – Psycho-Pirate (Masked)
- Figure 50 – Psycho-Pirate (Unmasked)
- Figure 51 – Red Arrow
- Figure 52 – Martian Manhunter
- Figure 53 – Blue Beetle
- Figure 54 – Bizarro
- Figure 55 – Captain Marvel Jr. (unreleased)
- Figure 56 – Mary Marvel
- Figure 57 – Captain Atom
- Figure 58 – Firestorm
- Figure infinity – Monitor
- Figure infinity – Anti-Monitor

==== Crisis: Series One 3-packs ====
- Three Pack 1 – Commissioner Gordon, Gotham City S.W.A.T. Team Members
- Three Pack 2 – The Flash (Wally West), Mirror Master, Weather Wizard
- Three Pack 3 – Wonder Girl (Cassie Sandsmark), Superman, Supergirl (Kara Zor-El)
- Three Pack 4 – Starfire, Captain Boomerang (Owen Mercer), Raven
- Three Pack 5 – Green Lantern (Hal Jordan), Green Arrow, Black Canary
- Three Pack 6 – Hawkman, Thanagarian Soldiers
- Three Pack 7 – Lex Luthor, LexCorp Troopers
- Three Pack 8 – Flash (Jay Garrick), Mirror Master, Weather Wizard
- Three Pack 9 – Wonder Girl (Cassie Sandsmark), Bizarro, Supergirl (Kara Zor-El)
- Three Pack 10 - ??
- Three Pack 11 – Captain Marvel, Mary Marvel, Black Adam
- Three Pack 12 – Harbinger, Shadow Demons
- Three Pack 13 – Green Lantern (Hal Jordan), Star Sapphire, Black Hand
- Three Pack 14 – Animal Man, Starfire, Adam Strange
- Three Pack 15 – ??
- Three Pack 16 – ??
- Three Pack 17 – Batwoman, Nightwing (Red), Robin (Tim Drake)
- Three Pack 18 – Sinestro (Sinestro Corps Uniform), Parallax (Kyle Rayner), John Stewart (Green Power Glow)

==== 75th Anniversary Figures ====
Each included a 75th anniversary collector's pin

- Batman (redeco)
- Black Adam (cape added)
- Black Canary (redeco)
- Deathstroke
- Firestorm (released in Crisis packaging)
- Green Lantern (Hal Jordan)
- Guy Gardner (translucent green "construct" redeco)
- Joker (new)
- Mister Terrific (new)
- Robin (Earth-Two)
- Two-Face (new)
- Wonder Girl (redeco of original figure)
- Wonder Woman (reissue of single #27)

Three Packs

- Robin, Doctor Light, Ravager
- Trickster, The Flash, Heatwave

==== Batman: Gotham Knight ====
- Three Pack – Batman, Scarecrow, Deadshot (Batman: Gotham Knight versions)

==== Target Exclusives ====
===== Superman/Batman Public Enemies Three Packs =====
- Superman, Power Girl, Lex Luthor (Battle Armor)
- Batman, Black Lightning, Captain Atom

===== Superman/Batman Public Enemies Six Pack =====
- Superman
- Hawkman
- Batman
- Major Force
- Gorilla Grodd
- Lex Luthor

==== Toys "R" Us Exclusives ====
===== Two Packs =====
- Guy Gardner, Black Hand
- Batman, Gotham City S.W.A.T.
- Flash (Wally West), Professor Zoom
- Captain Marvel, Black Adam

===== Defense of Oa Six Pack =====
- Guy Gardner
- Hal Jordan (Green Power Glow)
- John Stewart
- Qwardian Soldier
- Manhunter Robots (Battle-Damaged)

===== Gotham City Patrol Six Pack =====
- Batman
- Catwoman
- Hush (Jason Todd)
- Killer Croc
- Gotham City S.W.A.T. Team Members

===== Battle for Metropolis Eight Pack =====
- Captain Atom
- Captain Marvel
- Lex Luthor (battle-suit)
- Superman (Kingdom Come)
- 4 Luthor Troopers

==== Walmart Exclusive ====
===== Mallah's Revenge Value Gift Pack (commonly known as "Teen Titans Six Pack") =====
- Arsenal (unreleased single #23)
- Brain (new)
- Cyborg (new)
- Monsieur Mallah (new)
- Raven (reissue)
- Robin (Tim Drake)

===== OMAC Attack Six Pack =====
- Booster Gold (new)
- Maxwell Lord (new)
- OMAC (reissue)
- Superman (redeco of version 1 with red "heat vision" eyes)
- Wonder Woman (redeco of version 1 with gold trim)

===== Prelude to Doomsday Six Pack =====
- Bloodwynd (new)
- Doomsday (new)
- Fire (new)
- Guy Gardner (redeco of version 1 in blue solo costume [non-Green Lantern, non-Warrior])
- Ice (new)
- Superman (redeco of version 1 with battle damage)

==== Movie Exclusives ====
- Green Lantern (comes with the Best Buy exclusive version of Green Lantern: First Flight special edition DVD)
- Wonder Woman (comes with the Best Buy exclusive version of Wonder Woman Limited Edition 2 disc package)

==== San Diego Comic-Con Exclusives ====
- 2009: Anti-Monitor (3 3/4" version available for 50 Anti-Monitor points or $10)
- 2010: Starro (window box reproduction of The Brave and the Bold issue #28, with Starro vs. Aquaman, Wonder Woman [with golden string lasso], Flash [Barry Allen], Martian Manhunter [with blue cape], and Green Lantern [Hal Jordan, with translucent green energy construct], with lights and sound narration by Kevin Conroy, original voice of Batman from Batman: The Animated Series, et al.)

==== Upcoming Figures ====
Other figures that have been seen in prototype form, read about in case breakdowns, mentioned in leaked Wal-Mart SKUs or seen at Toy Fair include:

- Animal Man
- Batgirl
- Blue Beetle
- Captain Atom (Kingdom Come appearance/added articulation)
- Doctor Light (Arthur Light)
- Green Lantern (Guy Gardner) (transparent green/added articulation)
- Green Lantern (Hal Jordan) (added articulation)
- Green Lantern (John Stewart) (transparent green/added articulation)
- Harley Quinn
- Hawkgirl
- Heat Wave
- Mister Terrific
- Poison Ivy
- Ravager (Rose Wilson)
- Trickster

=== DC Universe Fighting Figures ===
These are 3-inch scale figures with identical sculpts to the 6-inch figures with limited articulation, display stands and action features and/or weapons. These were previously going to be called Battleague figures and marketed as game figures but were later on consolidated into the DC Universe line as collectible figurines.

==== Figures ====
- Catwoman vs. Batman
- The Joker vs. Batgirl
- Superman vs. Darkseid
- Two-Face vs. Batman
- Two-Face vs. Robin

==== Unreleased ====
The backs of the figure packages featured many more Fighting Figures but apparently none of them were released.

=== DC Universe Giants of Justice ===
While the Fighting Figures are half the size of the main line. These are double-sized versions of characters previously released as 6" figures. It is a continuation of the Mattel 12" Batman and Mattel 12" DC Superheroes line.

==== Series One ====
The first Giants of Justice were released practically unannounced. As soon as the line was mentioned by Mattel, they were already showing up in Toys "R" Us locations and eBay.

- Batman (costume repainted gray and blue)
- Batman (variant, costume repainted gray and black)
- Killer Croc (classic)
- Superman (classic)
- Cyborg Superman (Villain)

==== SDCC 2009 Exclusive ====
- Flash (Barry Allen)

== See also ==
- Batman (2003 toy line)
- DC Superheroes
- Marvel Legends, Marvel Comics' counterpart to DC Universe Classics
- Marvel Universe, a toyline similar to Infinite Heroes featuring Marvel Comics characters
