= Justice Lords =

Fictional characters

- Justice Lords' model sheets

Publication information
- Publisher: DC Comics
- First appearance: Justice League, episode "A Better World"
- Created by: Stan Berkowitz

In-story information
- Base(s): The Watchtower

The Justice Lords are a fictional team of anti-heroes/anti-villains who first appeared in the two-part Justice League episode "A Better World", which was broadcast on November 1, 2003.

The Justice Lords were brought into DC Comics' canonical multiverse with The Multiversity Guidebook #1 by Grant Morrison in 2015. Their world is situated on Earth-50.

== Television appearances ==
The Justice Lords are an alternate Justice League from a parallel Earth. After Lex Luthor is elected President of the United States, kills the Flash, and establishes policies resulting in a potential nuclear war, Batman, Superman, and Wonder Woman storm the White House and confront Luthor in an attempt to prevent the war. When Luthor tells Superman no matter how many times he sends him to prison, he would find a way back to power, Superman kills Luthor with his heat vision, and decides he likes this new form of "justice". The other Justice League members also lose faith in humanity. Over the course of two years, the Justice Lords take control of the world's governments, which they rule over in an authoritarian manner. They eliminate crime by lobotomizing criminals and supervillains through Lord Superman's heat vision, and establish policies that get people arrested for minor disturbances.

=== "A Better World" ===
The Justice Lords discover their counterparts when Lord Batman finds the League during an experiment which allowed him to view the alternate universe (later designated Earth-12), as well as be transported there. Bored with their own world, the Lords decide to "assist" their counterparts by having their tyranny on the League's world, and trick them into going to the alternate Earth. When the League arrives, they are imprisoned and rendered unconscious. They are later transferred to cells designed to neutralize their powers, and Lord Batman stays behind to keep watch over them.

When the rest of the Lords arrive on the League's Earth, they encounter Doomsday, who Superman lobotomizes. Lois Lane is surprised by this, saying it is unlike him. Watching the events from prison, Lex Luthor immediately recognizes that the Lords are not the League.

The League escapes from the holding facility when the Flash accelerates his heartbeat to make Lord Batman think that he has flatlined. Lord Batman opens the Flash's cell door, and is quickly locked in the cell by the Flash and the League escapes. Most go to Arkham Asylum to retrieve Hawkgirl, while Batman goes to the Batcave to get the dimensional transporter: His resultant fight against Lord Batman ends when Lord Batman seemingly convinces Batman into accepting the Lords' methods, by pointing out they prevent events like the deaths of their respective parents, but Batman later convinces Lord Batman that the Lords' methods are wrong. Lord Batman saves the League from the alternate Earth's security forces and sends them back to their reality.

On mainstream Earth, Superman approaches Lex Luthor for help against the Lords, who agrees in exchange for a presidential pardon. The League distracts the Lords to allow Luthor to use a power disruptor to remove their powers. The Lords are sent back to their Earth, and Luthor expresses his intention to enter politics.

=== Long-term effects ===
The Lords' proposed alterations of mainstream Earth have repercussions in the first two seasons of Justice League Unlimited. The events of "A Better World" aid Amanda Waller's crusade against the destructive capabilities of the metahuman population if the government left it unchecked. When Batman confronts Waller, she reveals simulations that show what would happen if the League went rogue; each time, the government was defeated. Project Cadmus, established to counter Superman if he went rogue, expanded its threat list to the entire Justice League. In "Divided We Fall", Lex Luthor fuses with Brainiac and creates duplicate androids of the Lords to fight the League. The Flash exceeds his maximum speed to destroy Brainiac, vanishing into the Speed Force. With Flash supposedly dead and Luthor at his mercy, Superman is put in the same position as his Justice Lord counterpart, but resists the temptation. J'onn then senses Flash's presence, and the League successfully pulls him back to reality.

=== My Adventures with Superman ===
The Justice Lords incarnation of Superman makes a non-speaking appearance in the My Adventures with Superman episode "Kiss Kiss Fall in Portal".

== Members ==
- Superman (voiced by George Newbern) — Leader of the Justice Lords who breaks into the White House and kills President Luthor after Luthor kills Flash. He and the other Lords then impose their version of justice on the world. Superman lobotomizes the villains (including Joker, Poison Ivy, Two-Face, Doomsday and Ventriloquist), despite opposition from Lois Lane. He and the other Lords capture the Justice League and plan to take over their Earth. Responding to Lex Luthor's escape from prison, he leads the others into a trap in which Luthor is the Justice League's Martian Manhunter. Superman defeats Flash and is willing to kill him when Luthor blasts him with an energy disruptor.
- Batman (voiced by Kevin Conroy) — Unlike the others, Batman is morally ambiguous; while he does not join in their escapades, he is unperturbed by them. Batman discovers the Justice League, captures them with the other Lords and takes over their world. When Batman remains behind to guard the League, the Flash accelerated his heart rate until he seemed to flatline. Although Batman is alerted, the Flash overpowers him and locks him up. He escapes and battles League Batman in the Batcave. Though he initially convinces League Batman to side with him, witnessing a man being arrested for simply complaining about a restaurant bill makes him realize that the League's cause is just, with his counterpart reminds him of why they chose to be Batman. League Batman convinces him to help the League return to their world.
- Wonder Woman (voiced by Susan Eisenberg) — Helps Superman defeat and lobotomize Doomsday. She is defeated by her counterpart when Luthor blasts her with an energy disruptor.
- J'onn J'onzz (voiced by Carl Lumbly) — When the Lords discover the Justice League, he leads them into a trap and helps in the fight against Doomsday. He is defeated by his League counterpart (Martian Manhunter), aided by Luthor and his energy disruptor.
- Green Lantern (voiced by Phil LaMarr) — Unlike his League counterpart, he maintains his relationship with Hawkgirl.
- Hawkgirl (voiced by Maria Canals-Barrera) — She maintains her relationship with John Stewart.
- Flash — When Luthor becomes president, he sends the army after the Flash and kills him.

== Merchandise ==
The Justice Lords were released in the Justice League Unlimited toy line in three 3-pack collector sets. The first set featured Superman, Batman, and Wonder Woman. A reviewer wrote that although they do not stand up on their own, they "represent one of the most popular episodes of the entire Justice League series". The next pack contained Martian Manhunter, Green Lantern and the Flash. The final set contained Hawkgirl and the Brainiac versions of Superman and Batman. In 2012 Treehouse Kids released its Heroics line of collectable figurines, which includes Justice Lords Superman as a chase figure.

== Inspiration and parallels ==
According to the DVD commentary on the second part of "A Better World", although the Justice Lords began as a Crime Syndicate of America story, the writers decided that a story about a rogue Justice League had more story potential as the Crime Syndicate was simply evil. The episode is similar to a Dan Jurgens Justice League America story, "Destiny's Hand". In that story, the Atom dreams about the original Justice League becoming oppressive rulers of the world. Doctor Destiny tries to make this "dream universe" absorb the mainstream reality, and the modern Justice League fights the "evil" old Justice League.

In the DC Animated Universe itself, the Superman: The Animated Series episode "Brave New Metropolis" depicted an alternate Superman becoming a dictator after Lois Lane's death. The episode was also written by Stan Berkowitz.

The alternate universe presented in Injustice: Gods Among Us also shared much similarity to the Justice Lords, in that a parallel version of the Justice League, save for Batman, became oppressive rulers of the world after Superman was tricked by the Joker into killing Lois Lane, their unborn child, and destroying Metropolis with a nuclear bomb. Superman kills the Joker in retaliation, leading to his descent to tyranny.

The premise of a Justice League-type super-team establishing a totalitarian state for what they see as the good of humanity was explored in Marvel Comics' original Squadron Supreme miniseries, its later reworking of the story, in WildStorm's The Authority, and the "Titans Tomorrow" storyline of the Teen Titans comic book. The idea of metahumans taking control of humans, and of Superman leading them to make a better world, is also developed in the Elseworlds mini-series Kingdom Come. According to Bruce Timm's DVD commentary, Batman was to form the Outsiders as a counter-superteam of the Lords but the idea was discarded. In the Avengers Annual #2, the Avengers are sent to an alternate world by an early version of Kang the Conqueror; the original Avengers take over the world and imprison other super-beings, allegedly for their own good. The idea of altering criminals to prevent them from returning to crime was also part of the DC Comics miniseries Identity Crisis (albeit using magic and primarily intended to protect the heroes' secret identities) and Marvel Comics' Squadron Supreme.

== Mainstream comics ==
In Grant Morrison's series The Multiversity, the Justice Lords were brought into mainstream comic continuity, being revealed to originate from Earth-50.
