= Cyclotron (character) =

- The Terry Curtis incarnation of Cyclotron as depicted in Who's Who: The Definitive Directory of the DC Universe #5 (July 1985). Art by Jerry Ordway.

Publication information
- Publisher: DC Comics
- First appearance: Terry Curtis: Action Comics #21 (1940) as Cyclotron: All-Star Squadron #21 (1983)
- Created by: Terry Curtis: Jerry Siegel and Joe Shuster; Cyclotron: Roy Thomas

In-story information
- Alter ego: Terrence Kurtzberger
- Species: Metahuman
- Abilities: Superhuman strength; Flight; Atomic manipulation

Cyclotron is the name of two characters appearing in American comic books published by DC Comics. Though a minor character, he holds an important place in the history of the Justice Society as a source of power and inspiration for both the Atom and Atom Smasher.

== Publication history ==
Terry Curtis was originally an obscure one-shot Superman character in Action Comics #21 (1940) who was a scientist who was kidnapped by Ultra-Humanite and forced to build an "atomic disintegrator".

Roy Thomas reinvented the character as Cyclotron, a reluctant supervillain, in All-Star Squadron #21 (1983) from DC Comics. He was one of the few original villains retroactively added to DC's Golden Age era in the series.

== Fictional character biography ==
=== Terry Curtis ===
Terry Curtis was an atomic scientist in the 1930s and 1940s. Born Terrence Kurtzenberg, he had later Anglicized his name. In the past, he had a brief romantic relationship with Danette Reilly, the second Firebrand. Curtis gains superpowers after being captured and experimented on by Ultra-Humanite, who intends to make use of his knowledge.

Used as a pawn by the villain, Curtis is forced to battle the All-Star Squadron. The Atom confronts Curtis and is exposed to his radiation, eventually gaining superpowers himself. Curtis is killed after attempting to kill Ultra-Humanite by detonating himself. Curtis' daughter Terri eventually has a son, Albert, who gains superpowers from her and Terry's exposure to radiation.

=== Clarence Simms ===
In 2016, DC Comics implemented a relaunch of its books called "DC Rebirth", which restored its continuity to a form much as it was prior to "The New 52" reboot. Clarence Simms appears in the crossover series Justice League vs Suicide Squad as a member of the initial Suicide Squad. On a mission to Jagsun, he organizes a double cross to take the island's God-Engine for himself, but is killed by Waller.

== Powers and abilities ==
The first Cyclotron has immense strength, the ability to fly, project blasts of atomic energy, and manipulate matter on a molecular level. He can even sap his opponent's physique by touching them. He additionally possesses expertise in science.

The second Cyclotron is capable of generating energy.

== In other media ==
- An original incarnation of Cyclotron appears in the Super Powers Collection action figure line and its tie-in comic. This version, also known as Alex LeWitt, is an android created by Superman who was programmed with all the powers and weaknesses of every superhero and supervillain to serve as the Justice League's tactician.
- A figure of Cyclotron was released in the DC Universe Classics line in April 2010.
