= DC Universe Classics =

Sub-line of the DC Universe toy brand

- Type: Action figure
- Invented by: DC Comics
- Company: Mattel
- Country: United States
- Availability: 2008–2014
- Materials: Plastic
- Features: DC Comics Universe

DC Universe Classics was an action figure toyline, a sub-line of the DC Universe toy brand manufactured by Mattel. They were 6-inch scale figures based on the fictional characters owned by DC Comics. The entire line was sculpted by the Four Horsemen Studios, and was first available for sale in 2008. The "DC Classics" line ceased to be sold at retail in 2012. The series then became an online-and-convention exclusive line. It was announced in late 2014 that the line would end with a final series of six figures celebrating the history of the line.

== History ==
In 2007, Mattel was granted the rights to produce action figures of all DC Comics characters, although the company indicated the agreement excluded the DC Comics imprints Impact Comics, Vertigo, and WildStorm. DC Universe Classics was first announced at San Diego Comic-Con in 2007, with the first wave of action figures on display. The line was scheduled for initial availability in January 2008. At SDCC, close-ups of the second wave of action figures were shown, along with a line of 3" game figures that sold as the "Fighting Figures" sub-line. The second wave of Classics figures (and variants) was shown at Wizard World Chicago, alongside the first wave of figures. The third wave of figures was announced in October 2007, with photos being shown in the December 12, 2007, issue of ToyFare magazine. The fourth and fifth waves were announced at the 2008 New York Comic Con, and three of the five (six, including the Collect and Connect figure) figures from the sixth wave were shown at Wizard World Philadelphia in May 2008. More figures were revealed at the 2008 San Diego Comic-Con and on MattyCollector.com.

The final wave of action figures to be sold at retail was Wave 20. The line was re-branded as DC Universe All-Stars and included Superman (New 52), Superboy-Prime, Batman (New 52), and Red Robin, but was later canceled due to fan criticisms and lack of retailer interest. It was then rebranded into two different lines. One for Batman and one for the rest of the DC Universe; the lines were called Batman Unlimited and DC Unlimited, respectively. These lines were cancelled in 2013.

== Collect and Connect ==
Mattel emulated Toy Biz' Marvel Legends Build-A-Figure concept with the DC Universe Classics line, which featured "Collect and Connect" with five (and later, six) separate figures, including pieces to build one of DC's larger characters. Variant versions of figures include the same piece as the regular version. Collect and Connect figures are at least 25% larger than the regular figures in the wave.

== Criticisms ==
Collectors said they had difficulty finding figures in many retail stores. For collectors, the issue was pronounced with the Walmart-exclusive fifth wave, which was underordered by the retail chain, but was later re-released and sold online at Mattel's website. Mattel has since showed that the company has improved the availability of action figures in the line.

Availability also became a concern with the San Diego Comic-Con exclusive Gleek figure, which was only available at the convention and not offered on Mattel's website after the show. The figure quickly sold out and was never re-released.

Collectors, concerned about quality control, said some figures they purchased had stuck joints, bad paint applications, and mismatched parts. Others have complained about scale issues, with certain figures produced either too large (Lobo, Rocket Red) or too small (Sinestro, Big Barda), as well as the fact that Collect and Connect figures had a height limit.

Collectors saw relatively quick price jumps since the line began. Initially, figures sold for under $10 each. Later, as the U.S. economy worsened in 2008–09, collectors saw price hikes of individual figures to $12.99 and then to $14.99 by 2010. In 2011, figures are sold for $15.99 to $17.99 in stores such as Toys R Us, Target, and Walmart. In 2012, Target made the price jump again by pricing the Batman Legacy Arkham City figure at up to $20.97.

== Super Powers influence ==
DC Universe Classics takes much of its inspiration from Kenner's Super Powers toyline from the 1980s, from character choices to their general design. All the characters who were in the Super Powers line have appeared in DC Universe Classics and DC Superheroes, although four of them (Kalibak, the Penguin, Orion, and Mr. Freeze) differ from how they looked in Super Powers (though Freeze would be re-released later with his Super Powers color scheme, and Penguin has been released in a more Super Powers-accurate version under the Batman Unlimited brand, also Kalibak has been re-released as a Collect and Connect figure in his Super Powers accurate color scheme with the 30th Anniversary Super Powers Collection). Some characters who were redesigned for the Super Powers line (Parademon, Mantis, and Steppenwolf) were released in two versions—a comic-accurate version and a Super Powers version. Even the characters Cyclotron and Golden Pharaoh–created specifically for the Super Powers line—were released in DC Universe Classics. Further, figures that were going to be produced later in the Super Powers line were created as part of DC Universe Classics (including characters from Super Friends like El Dorado and the Wonder Twins).

== ToyFare Fans' Choice ==
ToyFare #133 launched a contest similar to one by Marvel Legends for DC Universe Classics. Through an online vote, fans of DC Universe Classics could choose from a list of six characters to appear in a future wave: Catman, Huntress, The Question, Ragman, Starman, and Vixen. It was announced that the Question came out on top in the December 2008 issue of ToyFare. He appeared in the eleventh wave of Classics.

For its 2009 poll, the DC Universe brand managers and ToyFare staff picked another group of six characters to include in the line: Captain Marvel Jr., Geo-Force, Libra, Raven, Toyman, and Uncle Sam. The winner by a large margin was Raven, who was released in the line's fifteenth wave.

The 2010 ToyFare poll differs from the previous two polls in that instead of choosing a regular figure from an upcoming wave, fans chose the Collect and Connect figure, with the options being Blockbuster, Girder, King Shark, Nekron, Shaggy Man, and Wildebeest. The winner of this poll was Nekron, who appeared in the line's twentieth wave.

== Figures ==
The first wave of figures was shown at San Diego Comic-Con, while the second wave was shown at Wizard World Chicago. At the outset of the line, five figures were included in each wave (with variants included when possible), with five waves per year for five years. These plans were altered to increase the number of figures per wave to seven, beginning with the seventh series, and to include retailer, convention, and online exclusives at various times throughout the year. Beginning with wave sixteen, the line was scaled back to six figures per wave (plus one variant).

=== Wave One - Metamorpho ===
Batman heads this first line of figures. The Penguin, Red Tornado, and Etrigan were originally intended to have variants which were scrapped at different times. The Penguin's chase robotic penguin accessories were dropped for cost reasons, while Red Tornado's modern costume and a repainted Etrigan to better reflect the art of Jack Kirby were skipped in favor of getting the second wave out as soon as possible. Some of the Batman figures are labeled "Crime Stopper", while others are dubbed "Classic Detective". It is unknown if this was a variant or a running change. Along the same lines, the first shipment of figures showed the classic Red Tornado on the back of the package, while the second shipments showed the modern incarnation.

The Collect and Connect figure for this wave is Metamorpho, labeled "Rex Mason, the Element Man". Metamorpho includes snap-on accessories, including a giant right hand, a giant hammer for his left hand, and an extension for his right leg.

Number	Figure	Collect and Connect Piece
1	Orion	Right leg
2	Crime Stopper or Classic Detective Batman	Right arm
3	The Penguin	Head, torso
4	Red Tornado	Left leg
5	Etrigan the Demon	Left Arm

=== Wave Two - Gorilla Grodd ===
The electric-costume Superman from the late 1990s anchored this second assortment of figures. There are three characters with two versions each; cases included both Superman variants and either the modern or classic Aquaman, with the modern one packed at a smaller ratio to the classic incarnation. Firestorm was released as a running change, with Ronnie Raymond appearing in the first shipments and the Jason Rusch incarnation in later shipments. The Collect and Connect for this wave is Gorilla Grodd.

Number	Figure	Collect and Connect Piece	Version
1	Firestorm	Right leg	
1	Firestorm	Right leg	Ronnie Raymond (Classic), Jason Rusch (Modern)
2	Aquaman, King of Atlantis	Right arm	
2	Aquaman, King of Atlantis	Right arm	Arthur Curry (Classic),Arthur Joseph Curry (Modern)
3	Harley Quinn	Head, torso	
4	Superman	Left arm	
4	Superman	Left arm	Superman Red/Superman Blue
5	Black Manta	Left leg	

=== Wave Three - Solomon Grundy ===
Hal Jordan heads this third line of figures. Nightwing and Robin are redone in this third wave after both previously having been produced when the line was DC Superheroes. The previous representations of these two characters were not sculpted by the Four Horsemen. The wave was first seen in the December 12, 2007 issue of ToyFare. Sinestro's variants were issued at a 50:50 ratio, while Deathstroke's were slightly less. The Collect and Connect for this wave is Solomon Grundy.

Number	Figure	Collect and Connect Piece	Version
1	Sinestro	Right leg	
1	Sinestro	Right leg	Sinestro Corps
2	Deathstroke	Right arm	
2	Deathstroke	Right arm	Slade Wilson masked/unmasked
3	Nightwing	Head, torso	
4	Robin (Tim Drake)	Left arm	
5	Green Lantern (Hal Jordan)	Left leg	

=== Wave Four - Despero ===
Wonder Woman anchors the fourth wave of figures. She and Cyborg were revealed at Toy Fair in 2008. The rest of the lineup was unveiled at New York Comic Con 2008. At the 2008 San Diego Comic-Con, it was announced that Batman Beyond and Cyborg would feature variants that would be exclusive to KB Toys. Following KB's bankruptcy, the Batman Beyond and Cyborg variants were included with shipments from other retailers. The Collect and Connect for this wave is Despero in his mid-1990s incarnation, complete with two guns.

Number	Figure	Collect and Connect Piece	Version
1	Wonder Woman	Right leg	
1	Artemis	Right leg	variant
2	Cyborg	Right arm	
2	Cyborg	Right arm	Super Powers/Sonic Blast Arm; KB Exclusive
3	Captain Atom	Head, torso	
3	Captain Atom	Head, torso	Classic/Kingdom Come version
4	Batman (Terry McGinnis)	Left arm	
4	Batman (Terry McGinnis)	Left arm	Masked/Unmasked; KB Exclusive
5	Ares	Left leg	

=== Wave Five (Walmart exclusive) - Metallo ===
At the 2008 New York Comic Con, Mattel announced Walmart would begin carrying DC Universe Classics figures starting with wave three, besides receiving a store-exclusive wave in November 2008. At the request of Walmart, the characters included in this wave are characters that could be created using relatively few new parts.

The Collect and Connect for this wave is a mech version of Metallo. According to the Four Horsemen panel at Wizard World Philadelphia, Metallo was originally sculpted to be part of DC Superheroes but was held back when Mattel was awarded the full license to the DC library.

Following problems with the distribution of this wave at retail, the wave was re-released only on MattyCollector.com in June 2010.

Number	Figure	Collect and Connect Piece
1	Amazo	Right leg
2	Atom	Right arm
3	Riddler	Head, torso
4	Eradicator	Left arm
5	Black Lightning	Left leg

=== Wave Six - Kalibak ===
Unveiled in its entirety during the 2008 San Diego Comic-Con, the sixth assortment of DC Universe Classics contains several characters from Jack Kirby's Fourth World storyline. Superman is, once again, the tent pole character for the wave. The Collect and Connect for this wave is Darkseid's son Kalibak with his Beta-Club.

Number	Figure	Collect and Connect Piece	Version
1	Mister Miracle	Right leg	
1	Doctor Impossible	Right leg	Variant
2	Hawkman	Right arm	
3	Killer Moth	Head, torso	
4	Superman	Left arm	
4	Superman	Left arm	Black recovery costume/Classic costume, long hair
5	Shazam	Left leg	

=== Wave Seven - Atom Smasher ===
Beginning with this wave, Mattel extended the number of figures in an assortment of five to seven. With these new assortments, six of the seven figures include a Collect and Connect piece to build a larger character; the seventh–who is usually the A-list hero included in the wave–includes a DC Universe display stand (which can also be bought in packs of 25 from Mattel's website). The seventh wave was shipped in two assortments – each containing a mix of World's Greatest Super Heroes figures along with the regular figures in the wave. The Collect and Connect figure for this wave is Atom Smasher.

Number	Figure	Description	Collect and Connect Piece
1	Ocean Warrior Aquaman		Upper/middle torso
2	Kid Flash (Wally West)		Right arm
3	Blue Beetle (Ted Kord)		Right leg
4	Booster Gold	Classic (with collar)/Modern (without collar)	Left leg
5	Big Barda	With helmet/unhelmeted	Left arm
6	Captain Cold		Head/lower torso
7	Flash		Figure stand

=== Wave Eight - Giganta ===
In November 2008, Mattel revealed the lineup for the eighth wave on its website, including pictures. Parademon variants have a 50:50 ratio. The Collect and Connect figure for this wave is Giganta in her classic cavewoman outfit. In addition, a miniature Atom figure was included with the Collect and Connect pieces.

Number	Figure	Collect and Connect Piece	Version
1	Commander Steel	Upper/middle torso	
2	Doctor Fate (Kent Nelson)	Right arm	
2	Doctor Fate (Hector Hall)	Right arm	variant
3	Mister Terrific	Right leg	
4	Vigilante	Left leg	
5	Parademon	Left arm	
5	Parademon	Left arm	Comic version/Super Powers version
6	Gentleman Ghost	Head, lower torso, and Mini Atom	
7	Hawkgirl	Figure stand	

=== Wave Nine - Chemo ===
On February 7, 2009, Mattel revealed the lineup for the ninth wave of the line at the 2009 New York Comic Con. One villain in the wave, Mantis, has a 50/50 split comprising his comic book counterpart and his depiction in the Super Powers line. A Guardian variant was initially shown, but cancelled in favor of the Wildcat variant. Some stores only received a fraction of their pre-orders from Mattel. The Collect and Connect for this wave is Chemo, the nemesis of the Metal Men, in his modern form. Chemo is the only Build A Figure with a variant. The torso piece was released with and without an inner bubbles insert. The "no bubbles" piece was the earlier release, and the "extra bubbles" piece replaced it.

Number	Figure	Collect and Connect Piece	Version
1	Wildcat	Head/middle torso	
1	Wildcat	Head/middle torso	Black costume/Blue costume
2	Deadshot	Right arm	
3	Guardian	Right leg	
4	Black Adam	Left leg	Classic, Scarab necklace
5	Mantis	Left arm	
5	Mantis	Left arm	Comics version/Super Powers version
6	Black Canary	Lower torso	
7	Green Arrow	Figure stand	

=== Wave Ten (Walmart exclusive) - Imperiex ===
The tenth assortment of DC Universe Classics is the second wave exclusive to Walmart. Man-Bat is a hold-over from the DC Superheroes line, which saw albino and clear versions released as convention exclusives, but the classic, brown version of the character was never released. The Collect and Connect for this wave is Imperiex.

Number	Figure	Collect and Connect Piece
1	Robotman	Upper/middle torso
2	Beast Boy	Right arm
3	Joker	Right leg
4	Power Girl	Left leg
5	Man-Bat	Left arm
6	Forager	Head, lower torso
7	Batman (black costume)	Figure stand

=== Wave Eleven - Kilowog ===
Included in this wave are several characters connected to Green Lantern. Also included is the winner of the 2008 ToyFare poll, the Question. The Collect and Connect for this wave is Kilowog.

Number	Figure	Collect and Connect Piece	Version
1	Katma Tui	Upper/middle torso	
2	Shark	Right leg	
3	Deadman	Right arm	
3	Deadman	Right arm	Solid/phasing variant
4	Cyborg Superman	Head, lower torso	Sinestro Corps version
5	Question	Left leg	
6	Green Lantern (John Stewart)	Left arm	
7	Steppenwolf	Figure stand	
7	Steppenwolf	Figure stand	Comics version/Super Powers version

=== Wave Twelve - Darkseid ===
Confirmed by Mattel and revealed for the first time in the November 2009 (#147) issue of ToyFare magazine, the twelfth wave of DC Universe Classics marks the switchover to a new theme and an updated package design. In celebration of DC Comics' 75th anniversary, each Classics and Infinite Heroes figure includes an anniversary button (75 buttons in all). Rather than featuring comic book art for only the characters appearing in a wave, the packaging showcases many DC characters.

The Collect and Connect for this wave is Darkseid, a larger version than the one released in the DC Superheroes line. Darkseid comes with his Killing Glove, which is interchangeable with his regular gloved hand, as well as a removable Mother Box.

Number	Figure	Collect and Connect Piece	Version
1	Eclipso	Right leg	
2	Spectre	Right arm	
2	Spectre	Right arm	Normal version/glow-in-the-dark version
3	Copperhead	Head, lower torso	
4	Doctor Mid-Nite	Left arm	
5	DeSaad	Figure stand	
6	Mary Marvel	Upper/middle torso	
6	Mary Marvel	Upper/middle torso	White costume/Light Red costume and Dark Red costume variants
7	Iron	Left leg	

=== Wave Thirteen - Trigon ===
After the official confirmation of the lineup for wave twelve came the leak of the thirteenth wave characters, as well as images. The wave includes the character Cyclotron, whose only previous appearance was as part of the Super Powers line. The modern Cheetah variant was originally shown in pictures with no clothing, but she was eventually released wearing a black outfit. However, some online retailers received quantities of the unclothed Cheetah. Mattel has showed that this version would see a general release, but it has since been put on hold. The Collect and Connect for this wave is Teen Titans foe Trigon, complete with his staff.

Number	Figure	Collect and Connect Piece	Version
1	Negative Man	Right arm/Staff	
1	Negative Man	Right arm/Staff	Bandaged head/Unbandaged head variant
2	Superboy	Left arm	
3	Cyclotron	Figure stand	
4	Blue Beetle (Jaime Reyes)	Left leg	
5	Cheetah	Right leg	
5	Cheetah	Right leg	Barbara Ann Minerva (with black outfit)
5	Cheetah	Right leg	Barbara Ann Minerva (without black outfit)
5	Cheetah	Right leg	Classic
6	Blue Devil	Upper torso, cape	
7	Donna Troy	Head, lower torso	

=== Wave Fourteen (Walmart exclusive) - Ultra-Humanite ===
Confirmed in ToyFare #152 and at the New York International Toy Fair, the fourteenth wave of DC Universe Classics is the third wave to be exclusive to Walmart. The Collect and Connect figure for this wave is the Ultra-Humanite. Unofficially, Tyr has a dark red and a light red variant.

Number	Figure	Collect and Connect Piece
1	Kamandi	Upper torso
2	Obsidian	Left arm
3	Tyr	Figure stand
4	Gold	Left leg
5	Hourman (Rex Tyler)	Head, lower torso
6	Zatanna	Right arm
7	Green Lantern (Alan Scott)	Right leg

=== Wave Fifteen - Validus ===
Officially confirmed on May 17, 2010, the fifteenth wave of DC Universe Classics includes another character exclusive to Super Powers–Golden Pharaoh. The winner of the 2009 ToyFare fans' choice poll, Raven, also makes her debut, as well as one of the runners-up from the 2008 poll, Starman (Jack Knight). This wave became available at Kmart stores and online retailers in early fall 2010, and was followed by other retailers later in the season. The Collect and Connect figure for this wave is Validus, an enemy of the Legion of Super-Heroes.

Number	Figure	Collect and Connect Piece	Version
1	Golden Pharaoh	Figure stand	
2	OMAC	Right arm	
3	Jemm	Left arm	
4	Raven	Right leg	
5	Martian Manhunter	Head, lower torso	
5	Martian Manhunter	Head, lower torso	Normal version/alien head, weapon hand
6	Starman (Ted Knight)	Left leg	
6	Starman (Ted Knight)	Left leg	Starman (Jack Knight)
7	Sinestro Corps Batman	Upper torso	

=== Wave Sixteen - Bane ===
In the September 2010 issue of ToyFare, pictures of part of the sixteenth wave were revealed–The Creeper and Jonah Hex, as well as the Collect and Connect figure. The rest of the wave was revealed at San Diego Comic-Con in 2010. Beginning with this wave, each wave will now contain six figures (besides one variant). Wave sixteen features a new, larger package design, including the art of iconic DC Comics heroes. The Collect and Connect figure for this wave is Bane, who features a new sculpture in a larger size, in relation to the DC Superheroes version.

Number	Figure	Description	Collect and Connect Piece
1	Jonah Hex		Left Leg
2	The Creeper		Right arm
3	Riddler	Classic	Left arm
4	Robin (Dick Grayson)	Dick Grayson (late-teens)/Dick Grayson (early-teens)	Head, lower torso
5	Mercury		Upper torso
6	Batman (Jean-Paul Valley)		Right leg

=== Wave Seventeen - Anti-Monitor ===
In December 2010, Mattel unveiled the lineup for the seventeenth wave of the line. Each figure is a tie-in to the Blackest Night storyline. The Collect and Connect figure for this wave is the Anti-Monitor.

Number	Figure	Collect and Connect Piece
1	Star Sapphire Wonder Woman	Upper and middle torso
2	Sinestro Corps Scarecrow	Right leg
3	Blue Lantern Flash	Left arm
4	Indigo Lantern Atom	Right arm
5	Orange Lantern Lex Luthor	Left leg
6	Black Lantern Hal Jordan	Head, lower torso
6	White Lantern Hal Jordan	Head, lower torso

=== Wave Eighteen - Apache Chief ===
Revealed at the 2011 International Toy Fair, most of the figures in this wave tie into Super Friends. The Collect and Connect figure for this wave is Apache Chief. This wave became the first to feature no variant figure which would continue for the duration of the line. Instead, Bronze Tiger featured an interchangeable head.

Number	Figure	Collect and Connect Piece
1	Black Vulcan	Left leg
2	El Dorado	Upper torso
3	Toyman	Right arm
4	Captain Boomerang	Head, lower torso
5	Samurai	Left arm
6	Bronze Tiger	Right leg

=== Wave Nineteen - S.T.R.I.P.E. ===
The website MTV Geek had the exclusive reveal for the nineteenth wave of the line. This time, each figure is a tie-in to the Justice Society of America. The Collect and Connect figure for this wave is S.T.R.I.P.E.

Number	Figure	Collect and Connect Piece
1	Sandman (Wesley Dodds)	Left leg
2	Atom (Al Pratt)	Head, lower torso
3	Stargirl	Right arm
4	Lord Naga	Upper torso
5	Hawkman (Carter Hall) (Golden Age)	Left arm
6	Magog	Right leg

=== Wave Twenty - Nekron ===
Revealed at the 2011 San Diego Comic-Con. The Collect and Connect figure for this wave is Nekron, the winner of the third ToyFare poll.

Number	Figure	Collect and Connect Piece
1	Hawk	Upper torso
2	Dove (Dawn Granger)	Lower torso
3	Red Arrow	Left arm
4	Green Arrow (Brightest Day)	Right arm
5	Sinestro	Head
6	White Lantern: The Flash	Right leg
7	Reverse Flash	Left leg

=== World's Greatest Super Heroes/All-Star ===
The seventh wave saw the first release of World's Greatest Super Heroes (WGSH) figures, re-releases of earlier figures with a DC Universe stand. Figures released in this wave included Batman (blue and gray), Firestorm, Green Lantern, Robin, Shazam, and Wonder Woman. Additional figures were released under the WGSH banner, and, later, under the All-Star banner (besides the figure stand, All-Star figures also include a 75th anniversary button).

Figure	Description	Original Release	WGSH/All-Star
Batman	Black and gray	Gotham City 5	WGSH and All-Star
Batman	Blue and gray	Wave One	WGSH
Firestorm	Ronnie Raymond	Wave Two	WGSH
The Flash		Wave Seven	WGSH and All-Star
Green Arrow		Wave Nine	All-Star
Green Lantern		Wave Three	WGSH
Nightwing		Wave Three	All-Star
Power Girl		Wave Ten	All-Star
Robin		Wave Three	WGSH
Shazam		Wave Six	WGSH
Superman		Gotham City 5	WGSH and All-Star
Wonder Woman		Wave Four	WGSH

=== Exclusives ===
==== 2008 ====
===== San Diego Comic-Con =====
The first DC Universe Classics exclusive figure, Lobo, was announced at the 2008 New York Comic Con. He was sold at the Mattel booth at the 2008 San Diego Comic-Con, though limited quantities were offered on Mattel's online store. His inclusion in the line had been in question for quite some time, as DC Comics did not feel as though he was a character they would want in a mass market toy line, because of his persona in the comics.

===== Toys "R" Us two-packs =====
Because of poor distribution when DC Universe Classics was still DC Superheroes, many fans could not get several of the figures offered. As a solution, Mattel released, exclusive to Toys "R" Us, two-packs that provided collectors with a way to purchase some of these older figures. In addition, the two-packs included new figures (Abin Sur and Lightray), and new versions of recent DC Universe Classics releases (Orion and Hal Jordan Green Lantern).

Name	Figures
Batman Figure Pack	Azrael
Batman Figure Pack	Batgirl
New Gods Figure Pack	Orion
New Gods Figure Pack	Lightray
Green Lantern Figure Pack	Hal Jordan
Green Lantern Figure Pack	Abin Sur
Super Enemies Figure Pack	Cyborg Superman
Super Enemies Figure Pack	Mongul

==== 2009 ====
===== MattyCollector.com two-packs =====
With the 2008 San Diego Comic-Con, Mattel launched a site featuring exclusive news and products that collectors can buy directly from Mattel. Though limited numbers of 2008 Comic-Con exclusives were made available for order in late July, exclusives began in the first quarter of 2009 with two-packs of previously unreleased characters.

Set	Name	Figures	Release Date
1	Space Heroes Two-Pack	Adam Strange	January 15, 2009
1	Space Heroes Two-Pack	Starfire	January 15, 2009
2	Battle for Earth 3	Ultraman	June 15, 2009
2	Battle for Earth 3	Alexander Luthor	June 15, 2009
3	Color of Fear	Romat-Ru	November 16, 2009
3	Color of Fear	Karu-Sil	November 16, 2009
4	Justice in the Jungle	Animal Man	December 15, 2009
4	Justice in the Jungle	B'wana Beast	December 15, 2009

===== Online and Toys "R" Us two-packs =====
Shortly before the 2008 Christmas holiday, four pre-orders for previously unannounced two-packs appeared on various online toy store websites. They were proposed as exclusives to online retailers and Toys "R" Us. Two of the four two-packs were released in 2009; the third two-pack (featuring Lex Luthor and Supergirl) was delayed until 2010, while the fourth (featuring the Golden Age Hawkman and Hawkgirl) was not released.

Name	Figures
Fists of Clay Figure Pack	Clayface
Fists of Clay Figure Pack	Batman
Clash in the Cosmos	Superman
Clash in the Cosmos	Brainiac

===== San Diego Comic-Con =====
The San Diego Comic-Con exclusive for 2009 was a two-pack of the Super Friends characters Zan and Jayna, better known as the Wonder Twins. Available both at San Diego and on MattyCollector.com, the set comes with the aforementioned twins, along with a bucket featuring Zan in his water form and Jayna as an eagle. Gleek, their pet monkey, was available for convention attendees only.

===== Walmart five-pack =====
An exclusive five-pack was offered by Walmart stores in 2009. Four of the five figures (Superman, Batman, Two-Face, and Catwoman) are repaints of figures from the DC Superheroes and DC Universe Classics lines, while the fifth figure (Lex Luthor) is an all-new sculpture.

==== 2010 ====
===== Online and Toys "R" Us two-packs =====
The delayed Kryptonite Chaos two-pack that was scheduled for 2009 was finally made available at retail alongside re-releases of the Green Lantern and Super Enemies two-packs from late 2008.

Name	Figures
Kryptonite Chaos	Lex Luthor
Kryptonite Chaos	Supergirl

===== Toys "R" Us All-Star figures =====
Four repaints (Batman, Green Lantern, The Flash, and Nightwing) were released only to Toys "R" Us stores. A fifth figure featuring The Joker repainted in an Alex Ross inspired black tuxedo design was scheduled to be released as well, but was cancelled.

===== DC Universe Classics Vs. Masters of the Universe Classics Toys "R" Us two-packs =====
Combining two of Mattel's properties, these sets of figures focus on releasing Masters of the Universe Classics figures at retail. The DC figures are straight re-releases of previously produced figures, while the Masters of the Universe Classics figures are repainted by the versions released on MattyCollector.com. The two-packs in the first series each come with an exclusive comic; two-packs in the second series each come with a mini-poster.

====== Series One ======
Name	Figures
Superman Vs. He-Man	Superman
Superman Vs. He-Man	He-Man
Lex Luthor Vs. Skeletor	Lex Luthor
Lex Luthor Vs. Skeletor	Skeletor

====== Series Two ======
Name	Figures
Hawkman Vs. Stratos	Hawkman
Hawkman Vs. Stratos	Stratos
Aquaman Vs. Mer-Man	Aquaman
Aquaman Vs. Mer-Man	Mer-Man

===== Walmart two-packs =====
Four exclusive two-packs were released at Walmart in 2010. The first two sets were composed entirely of repaints and feature no new sculpting; the second two were straight re-releases.

Name	Figures
Dynamic Duo	Batman
Dynamic Duo	Robin (Tim Drake)
Undersea Assault	Aquaman
Undersea Assault	Black Manta
Fates Intertwined	Hawkgirl
Fates Intertwined	Gentleman Ghost
Power Struggle	Superman
Power Struggle	Parasite

===== San Diego Comic-Con =====
In April 2010, the G4 series Attack of the Show! revealed that the 2010 San Diego Comic-Con exclusive would be Plastic Man, with multiple attachments, one of which (Plastic Man in suitcase form) was only available for convention attendees. In addition, the Starro exclusive for the DC Universe Infinite Heroes line came with a set of four Starro spores, which are compatible with the 6" DC Universe Classics line. Like the Plastic Man suitcase, these spores were exclusive to San Diego Comic-Con.

===== Walmart five-pack =====
Walmart's second exclusive five-pack featured two new characters (Guy Gardner and Tomar-Re), as well as three repaints of existing figures (Hal Jordan sporting grey temples circa the 1989 Green Lantern series, John Stewart in his Green Lantern: Mosaic costume, and a Green Lantern version of Sinestro).

==== 2011 ====
===== San Diego Comic-Con =====
On the April 28, 2011 episode of Attack of the Show!, it was revealed that the 2011 San Diego Comic-Con exclusive would be Swamp Thing, a character that was previously off-limits because for a time it was not part of the mainstream DC Universe. A set of Un-Men would also be sold as a convention-only exclusive.

===== DC Universe Classics Vs. Masters of the Universe Classics Toys "R" Us two-packs =====
Three more two-packs, including a combination of DC Universe Classics and Masters of the Universe Classics figures, were released. The Bizarro Vs. Faker two-pack was also available at San Diego Comic-Con.

Name	Figures
Bizarro Vs. Faker	Bizarro
Bizarro Vs. Faker	Faker
Green Lantern Vs. Zodac	Green Lantern
Green Lantern Vs. Zodac	Zodac
Supergirl Vs. She-Ra	Supergirl
Supergirl Vs. She-Ra	She-Ra

===== Two-packs =====
Two two-packs were released. The first two-pack re-released Harley Quinn from Wave 2 and appeared to include the cancelled All-Star Joker from 2010. The second two-pack re-released both Black Adam from Wave 9 and Captain Marvel from Wave 6. Adam does not have the Beetle Necklace of Wave 9.

Name	Figures
Mad Love	Joker
Mad Love	Harley Quinn
Mightiest Mortals	Black Adam
Mightiest Mortals	Shazam

===== Legion of Super-Heroes twelve-pack =====
Exclusive to MattyCollector.com was a twelve-pack of the Legion of Super-Heroes, the first time characters from this team were released in the DC Universe Classics line. Besides the twelve heroes listed below, the set also included a Proty accessory figure and a die-cast Legion flight ring. The ring is the difference between the original release and the reissue. The original one was gold plated. Also, an open figure slot is included in this package that is labeled for Invisible Kid.

- Superboy
- Cosmic Boy
- Lightning Lad
- Saturn Girl
- Brainiac 5
- Chameleon Boy
- Ultra Boy
- Karate Kid
- Wildfire
- Matter-Eater Lad
- Timber Wolf
- Colossal Boy

===== Wal-Mart five-pack =====
Exclusive to Wal-Mart was a five-pack of members of the Crime Syndicate of America, packaged with a combination of modern (Owlman, Superwoman, Ultraman) and classic (Johnny Quick, Power Ring) incarnations of the characters.

==== 2012 ====
===== Club Infinite Earths =====
Much like their existing subscription service for Masters of the Universe Classics, Mattel unveiled a subscription service for DC Universe Classics in 2011, intended to produce figures demanded by collectors. In September, Mattel revealed on their Facebook page that despite not reaching their subscriber goal, the club would still go forward. To offer the subscription, Mattel would raise the prices of figures for non-subscribers. They also revealed that the winner of the club's exclusive poll was Metron.

Besides Metron, the first figures to be released through the club were Atrocitus, Flash (Jay Garrick), Starman (Thom Kallor), and Poison Ivy. It was also revealed that Platinum, of the Metal Men, with her accessory Tin, Mirror Master, Black Mask, John Constantine, Uncle Sam, and filling the oversize slots, Rocket Red, Elasti-Girl, and Lead, of the Metal Men would be released. Mattel announced they were in preparation to announce the 2013 lineup during San Diego Comic-Con.

Month	Figure	Accessories
May	Flash (Jay Garrick)	
June	Atrocitus	Red Lantern
June (Club Exclusive)	Metron	Mobius Chair
July	Starman (Thom Kallor)	Variant head
July (Over Sized Figure)	Rocket Red	
August	Mirror Master	Mirror guns
September	Black Mask	Batman's cowl, dagger, and double sword staff
October	Poison Ivy	
October (Over Sized Figure)	Elasti-Girl	Elasti-Girl (minifigure)
November	Uncle Sam	Doll Man (minifigure)
November	John Constantine	
December	Platinum	Tin (minifigure)
December (Over Sized Figure)	Lead	

==== 2013 ====
The DC Club Infinite Earths 2013 line up was unveiled at SDCC that year, and included Saint Walker, Phantom Stranger, Elongated Man, Larfleeze, and Wally West. The Club Exclusive was Monsieur Mallah, with the Brain as an accessory.

On August 7, it was announced that the club would examine, reaching the minimum number of subscriptions. At New York Comic Con, it was revealed that Red Hood, Captain Marvel Jr., and Huntress would be released during 2013. The price of figures had increased from $15 to $18 (for subscribers) and from $18 to $20 (for non-subscribers). A new line called Club Black Freighter, based on the Watchmen series, would release figures bimonthly with six figures released. There would be no DC subscription for 2014, as pre-sales did not meet expectations. However, it was announced at New York Comic Con on 10/11/2013 that five figures would be released in 2014 to finish the line. "Hook hand" Aquaman would be released in March, Ice in June, Superboy in September, and Damian Wayne as Robin in December. "Containment Suit" Doomsday would be released as the SDCC exclusive and then on mattycollector.com, after Mattel apologized to its fans that they were not given the budget to do a full Doomsday figure, and could only afford a cheaper "Containment Suit" version. Shortly afterwards, Mattel announced that they would produce a full-on Collect and Connect sized "Doomsday Unleashed" figure, for nothing else than to give the fans a proper send-off and to apologize for their unproduced figures.

Month	Figure	Accessories
January	Saint Walker	Blue Lantern
February	Phantom Stranger	
March	Elongated Man	Magnifying glass
April	Larfleeze	Orange Lantern
April (Club Exclusive)	Monsieur Mallah	The Brain
May	Wally West	
June	Red Hood	Two red guns
July	Captain Marvel Jr.	
August	Fire	Plasma blast
September	Huntress (Helena Bertinelli)	Crossbow
October	Ocean Master	Ocean Power Trident
November	Ra's al Ghul	Scimitar
December	Batzarro	Batarang

2013 Club Black Freighter

Month	Figure	Accessories
January	Rorschach	Grapplegun
March	Doctor Manhattan	
May	Silk Spectre	
July	Nite Owl	Grapple gun, owl-a-rangs
September	Comedian	Flamethrower, shotgun
November	Ozymandias	Alternate head

==== 2014 ====
Month	Figure	Accessories
March	"Hook Hand" Aquaman	
June	Ice	One ice blast
September	Superboy	
December	Robin (Damian Wayne)	Red batarang
SDCC 2014	Doomsday Bound	
Winter 2015	Doomsday Unleashed	Shredded Superman cape

==== The End of the Line ====
The release of Doomsday Unleashed marked the final figure in the DC Universe Classics/DC Signature Series line, and Mattel even put "Final Figure" on the front of his box. Mattel offered one more set of six figures on their website celebrating the 30th anniversary of Kenner's Super Powers Collection, featuring a Collect and Connect Super Powers colored Kalibak figure. At retail, the line semi-continued under a few different names, Batman Unlimited and DC Comics Unlimited, which mixed the Horsemen sculpted comic-based figures with figures based on other media properties, like the Injustice series of video games. As of 2018, the Horsemen sculpted figures continue to be peppered into Mattel's DC Multiverse retail line, which brings back the Collect and Connect concept last seen in DC Universe Classics.
