= Copperhead (DC Comics) =

Publication information
- Publisher: DC Comics
- First appearance: The Brave and the Bold #78 (July 1968)
- Created by: Bob Haney (writer); Bob Brown (artist)

In-story information
- Alter ego: John Doe; Nathan Prince; Unknown; Jane Doe
- Species: Metahuman
- Team affiliations: (Doe and third Copperhead) Secret Society of Super Villains; Suicide Squad; Black Lantern Corps (Prince) Terror Titans
- Abilities: Supreme contortionist; Prehensile serpentine tail; Secretes deadly poison

Copperhead is the name of several supervillains appearing in American comic books published by DC Comics, mostly as enemies of the superhero Batman.

Female variations appeared in Batman: Arkham Origins, and in live action on the first season of Gotham (named Larissa Diaz), portrayed by Lesley-Ann Brandt.

== Publication history ==
Copperhead's first appearance in The Brave and the Bold #78 (July 1968). Art by Bob Brown.

The first Copperhead first appeared in The Brave and the Bold #78 (July 1968) and was created by Bob Haney and Bob Brown.

== Fictional character biography ==
=== John Doe ===
The criminal known as Copperhead first appeared in Gotham City in a copperhead costume. He commits numerous thefts before being apprehended by Batman and Batgirl. Copperhead then turns to more deadly pursuits as a super-assassin, constricting victims to death with his costume's tail.

At various times, he fought Hawk and Dove, Superboy, and Jack Knight, in addition to joining the original incarnation of Secret Society of Super Villains. Copperhead used the travel opportunities his freelance career afforded him to pursue his hobby of collecting transistor radios.

In Underworld Unleashed, Copperhead sells his soul to the demon Neron in exchange for power and is transformed into a snake hybrid.

Copperhead is later killed by Manhunter (Kate Spencer). He is resurrected as a Black Lantern in Blackest Night before being killed by several Lanterns.

=== Nathan Prince ===
Teen Titans (vol. 3) #56 featured a team of villains called the "Terror Titans", legacy villains whose mantles are inherited from older villains. One of the members shown is identified as Copperhead and appears visually as the character prior to the deal with Neron. The story did not reveal any information about the character or provide context with regard to previous stories.

In the subsequent Terror Titans miniseries, it is revealed that the second Copperhead's true identity is Nathan Prince, and he is the only member of the Terror Titans who does not have a familial connection to his predecessor. As a child, Nathan drowned his baby sibling out of jealousy, and even attempted to kill his parents. Unable to go through with it, he instead ran away to live on the streets, where he would solicit himself, having sex with older men, after which he would kill and rob them. During the Dark Side Club's metahuman battles, the heroine TNTeena is badly injured, and the Clock King tasks Copperhead with watching over her as she recuperates. Copperhead complies, and over time, falls in love with her. However, Nathan is later forced by the Clock King to kill her. Nathan and the rest of the Terror Titans are then sent to assist the Martyr Militia, a group of brainwashed metahumans, in destroying Los Angeles, but the tables are turned by Ravager and Miss Martian, the latter using her telepathy to undo the brainwashing. The Terror Titans flee to their base, only for the Clock King to kill Disruptor and leave them to be apprehended by the metahumans. Two weeks later, Nathan breaks his fellow Terror Titans out of custody, and the group swear revenge on the Clock King.

=== New 52 ===
A new incarnation of Copperhead appears in the New 52 continuity reboot. This version is a snake man and member of the Secret Society of Super Villains. He is killed by Deathstroke during the Forever Evil event.

=== Jane Doe ===
A female Copperhead using the alias Jane Doe makes her debut sometime after the death of her predecessor. This version of the character resembles the incarnation seen in Batman: Arkham Origins; DC creative officer Geoff Johns said that this new incarnation would appear as a villain in the New 52 after the game's release. It was adapted for comics in November 2016, three years after the game's release. This Copperhead is described as a deadly hitwoman and one of the two most toxic individuals on the planet (the other being Cheshire).

This Copperhead is a South American crime boss in Central City and a former mercenary who has fought Batman and the Flash. Two-Face placed a large bounty on Batman's head that many super-villains and mercenaries intended to collect, including Copperhead. Alongside several other villains, Copperhead tracked down Batman to an active train. Climbing on board, Copperhead attempted to kill Batman, but he was able to escape by jumping into a flowing stream. After a brief stint of assassinations and other mercenary jobs, Copperhead was called up to lead her families' crime business in Central City. After a mysterious rival boss started muscling in on her territory, she decided to hire several mercenaries to enforce her rule, including Shrapnel, Black Spider, and the Trigger Twins. However, they were all arrested by the Flash, which prompted Copperhead to open negotiations with the mysterious crime lord, whom she discovered was Captain Cold of the Rogues, to find a way to defeat the Flash. Copperhead followed Cold's plan to eliminate the Flash, but Cold turned on her when he planted a cold bomb in a weapons delivery. The Flash was able to save her after he apprehended Cold, but without any evidence of her involvement, she was allowed to walk free.

=== Unknown ===
An unidentified Copperhead takes part in a scheme organized by Helena Bertinelli's mother Fenice and is arrested by the Birds of Prey. He later appears as one of many villains who Batman and Catwoman defeat when he takes the latter on a typical night of his job. Copperhead is later shown as one of the many villains who are beaten down by Bane in his attempt to reach Batman in Arkham Asylum.

== Powers and abilities ==
Copperhead's contortionist skills allow him to fit himself into incredibly small spaces (such as chimneys). He originally wore a snake-themed costume made of metallic and elastic fibers and covered vulnerable points with Kevlar, making it bulletproof and impenetrable to almost any cutting weapon. The costume had been treated with a highly slippery water- and heat-proof silicon gel, allowing Copperhead to slide along any surface and slip out of tight spots. The tail could be stretched several feet and was strong enough to snap bone and shatter stone. The suit's helmet contained two seven-inch-long fangs which were capable of piercing human skin, and were coated in a potent neurotoxin derived from copperhead snakes. The toxin could paralyze a person almost instantly, and death would follow within 30 minutes. Later, Copperhead sold his soul to the demon Neron and was transformed into a human-snake hybrid. His reflexes and agility were greatly increased, and he gained venomous fangs, a forked tongue, claws, and a prehensile tail.

The second Copperhead does not have any superpowers and utilizes a snake-themed suit, like the original once did.

The Copperhead from The New 52 has snake-like abilities.

The female Copperhead does not appear to have any superpowers and instead uses different poison equipment such as darts in addition to being a skilled martial artist.

== Other characters named Copperhead ==
A version of Copperhead appears in Sensation Comics #15. This version is an enemy of Little Boy Blue.

Another character named Copperhead appeared in Leading Comics. Francisco Pizarro is a criminal who briefly turns the Seven Soldiers of Victory against each other during an Andes treasure hunt.

== Other versions ==
A child version of the John Doe incarnation of Copperhead named Johnny appears in the Tiny Titans comics.

== In other media ==
=== Television ===
- The John Doe incarnation of Copperhead appears in TV series set in the DC Animated Universe (DCAU), initially voiced by Efrain Figueroa and later by Jose Yenque. This version possesses snake-like physical attributes and is generally portrayed as incompetent, consistently outsmarting himself in almost every appearance.
  - Copperhead first appears in Justice League as a member of Lex Luthor and Aresia's Injustice Gangs.
  - Copperhead appears in Justice League Unlimited as a member of Gorilla Grodd's Secret Society before he is killed by Darkseid.
- The John Doe incarnation of Copperhead makes non-speaking cameo appearances in Batman: The Brave and the Bold.
- A female incarnation of Copperhead appears in the Gotham episode "Lovecraft", portrayed by Lesley-Ann Brandt. This version is Larissa Diaz, a professional assassin, contortionist, and hand-to-hand combatant.
- An original, female incarnation of Copperhead, with elements of John Doe and Jane Doe, appears in Bat-Fam, voiced by Kaitlyn Robrock. This version is an ex-villain.

=== Film ===
- The John Doe incarnation of Copperhead makes a cameo appearance in Superman/Batman: Public Enemies.
- An original incarnation of Copperhead named Sameer Park appears in Suicide Squad: Hell to Pay, voiced by Gideon Emery. This version is a cyborg metahuman contortionist with a prehensile tail and a metallic jaw capable of spitting acidic venom. He is recruited into Amanda Waller's Suicide Squad and tasked with retrieving a "Get Out of Hell Free" card for her. During the mission, Killer Frost betrays the team and nearly escapes with the card, but Copperhead fights her until Waller detonates a bomb implanted in his neck to keep the squad in line, killing him and Frost.

=== Video games ===
- The John Doe incarnation of Copperhead appears in Batman: The Brave and the Bold – The Videogame, voiced by Dee Bradley Baker.
- The John Doe incarnation of Copperhead appears as a character summon in Scribblenauts Unmasked: A DC Comics Adventure.
- An unnamed female incarnation of Copperhead appears as a boss in Batman: Arkham Origins, voiced by Rosa Salazar. This version is a skilled contortionist and escape artist who wields metal, clawed gloves coated with hallucinogenic toxins and is implied to be part of a group of South American assassins who all use the "Copperhead" moniker.
- The John Doe incarnation of Copperhead appears in Lego DC Super-Villains, voiced by Gideon Emery.

=== Miscellaneous ===
- A female incarnation of Copperhead appears in the Injustice: Gods Among Us prequel comic. She initially appears as a member of the Suicide Squad before siding with Superman's Regime.
- The John Doe incarnation of Copperhead appears in Batman: Arkham Unhinged #10 as a member of Amanda Waller's Task Force X.
- The John Doe incarnation of Copperhead appears in Batman '66 Meets Wonder Woman '77 #5.

=== Merchandise ===
- The John Doe incarnation of Copperhead received two action figures in the Justice League Unlimited toyline, with one appearing in a three-pack alongside Lex Luthor and Mirror Master.
- Copperhead received an action figure in Wave 12 of the DC Universe Classics line.
- Copperhead received an action figure in the DC Imaginext figure line as part of a two-pack alongside Batman.

== See also ==
- List of Batman family enemies
