= Wildcat (DC Comics) =

Fictional characters in the DC Universe

- The Ted Grant incarnation of Wildcat. Art by Sweeney Boo.

Publication information
- Publisher: DC Comics
- First appearance: Sensation Comics #1 (January 1942)
- Created by: Bill Finger; Irwin Hasen

In-story information
- Alter ego: Theodore "Ted" Grant
- Species: Human
- Place of origin: New York City
- Team affiliations: Justice Society of America; Infinity, Inc. Suicide Squad; All-Star Squadron; Justice League
- Partnerships: Hippolyta; Black Canary; Doctor Fate (Khalid Nassour); Catwoman
- Notable aliases: The Spectre
- Abilities: Skilled martial artist and boxer; Expert motorcylist; Skilled sports-related investigator

Wildcat is the codename of several superheroes published in American comic books by DC Comics. With the original debuting in Sensation Comics #1 (January, 1942) and created by Bill Finger and Irwin Hasen, the character is both a notable martial artist and a member of the Justice Society of America. Over time, like many other characters in the DC Universe, the codename is established as a legacy hero.

The original and most well-known version is Theodore "Ted" Grant, world-class heavyweight boxer who became a crime-fighter after being framed for a murder and was particularly inspired by other costume fighters emerging in the early 20th century, such as the original Green Lantern. In contemporary times, he is a combative mentor and trainer to various heroes and often clashes with progressive heroes, being characterized as well-meaning but rowdy and gruff personality with a streak of male chauvinism. In 2025, the character is killed off by Lady Eve in a battle protecting Doctor Fate against a new incarnation of the Injustice Society. Other versions of the Wildcat character exist; the second and current successor is Yolanda Montez, a Mexican-American metahuman and god-daughter of Ted who uses the codename to honor him following his injuries in Crisis in Infinite Earths. Subjected to a comic book death, she is revived and later is his successor in the role following his death. Grant's son, Tom Bronson, once also shared the codename with his father before adopting the codename Tomcat.

Ted Grant has made several appearances in DC media, such as the third season of Arrow, in which he was portrayed by J. R. Ramirez, and the DC Universe streaming service show Stargirl, portrayed by Brian Stapf. Additionally, Yolanda Montez also appears in Stargirl, portrayed by Yvette Monreal.

== Publication history ==
The original Wildcat, Ted Grant, debuted in Sensation Comics #1 (January 1942), created by Bill Finger and Irwin Hasen as part of several backup stories. Grant is a heavyweight boxing champion who was framed for murder and inspired by the original Green Lantern in adopting a costumed mantle. However, due to a decline in comic books featuring superheroes, the character's last appearance was in Sensation Comics #90.

In 1985, the second iteration of the character, Yolanda Montez, debuted in Infinity, Inc. #12, likely first being planned to being introduced as "La Garro" as it appeared in promotional material for Infinity, Inc or being a Canadian superheroine known as "The Lynx". A Mexican-American and god-daughter of the first Wildcat whose closeness originates from her father, a partner and rival boxer in his earlier years, the characters adopts the identity for a time after Wildcat's appearance in Crisis on Infinite Earths included him suffering crippling injuries. However, Yolanda is later killed off in Eclipso #13 (November 1993) by the title character. Ted Grant remained a reoccurring roster member and supporting character in both the 1999 JSA series and subsequent 2007 Justice Society of America comic book title.

Post-Flashpoint, the character was re-imagined to Earth-2 for a time, portrayed as a trainer and boxer who taught a later successor of Earth-2's Batman, Dick Grayson. Unlike prior, he did not adopt a costume. This is eventually revised in the Flash Forward series, reconciling his history and presence to be similar to prior depictions although he is significantly older. Yolanda Montez's version also returns in "The New Golden Age" storyline, coinciding with the "Lazarus Planet" event. In 2024, coinciding with the DC All In initiative, a new JSA series was announced in July with writer Jeff Lemire and illustrator Diego Olortengui as part of the creative team. Lemire revealed Wildcat as an important character, exploring a mentor dynamic with Khalid Nassour (Doctor Fate). Wildcat is killed while defending Nassour, with Yolanda Montez becoming the sole Wildcat in the second arc of the series.

== Characterization ==
The original Wildcat is an American superhero and investigator with a focus in sports crimes and whose alter ego marks him as heavyweight boxing champion and owner of a gymnasium. Over time, the character mentors numerous superheroes and characters of the DC Universe in combat, including Batman, the second Black Canary, Catwoman, Holly Robinson, Superman, the second Doctor Mid-Nite, and the modern version of Doctor Fate.

== Fictional character biography ==
=== Earth-Two history ===
Ted Grant first donned the Wildcat costume in Sensation Comics #1 (January 1942), the same issue in which Mister Terrific premiered.

Wildcat in the 1940s; art by Irwin Hasen.

Wildcat's origin is chronicled in Sensation Comics #1 as well as Secret Origins #3 (1973) and All-Star Squadron Annual #1 (1982). Henry Grant vowed on his baby son's crib that the child would not grow up afraid of life, so he encouraged his son to participate in sports. Orphaned during the Great Depression, Ted becomes a heavyweight boxing champion. He also became tangled unknowingly in his manager's sinister plans. His mentor "Socker" Smith was killed by Grant's managers Flint and Skinner who used a syringe, loaded with poison, in a boxing glove. The dose was only intended to slow down Smith, but the duo misjudged the potency. When Grant was arrested for the crime, Flint and Skinner, afraid that he might know what had really happened, arranged for the young fighter to be killed. Grant escaped the attempt and survived, but the policemen with him were killed. As a result, he became a fugitive. Later, he came upon a child who had been robbed of his Green Lantern comic. The boy, describing the mystery-man Green Lantern, inspired Grant to create a cat-themed costume. He took the name Wildcat and vowed to clear his name. He brought Flint and Skinner to justice; the criminals were forced to confess, clearing Grant's name, and obtaining justice for Smith. Using the identity of Wildcat, Grant continued to fight crime.

By issue #4, Wildcat had a custom motorbike, the "Cat-o-Cycle", and a comedic sidekick named Stretch Skinner.

In the pages of All Star Comics, Wildcat had a few adventures as a member of the Justice Society of America (JSA). In the 1980s, when the All-Star Squadron was published, it created a retroactive continuity in which the majority of WWII mystery-men interacted with each other. Wildcat had a place as a member of that conglomeration of heroes as well. The 1970s run of All Star Comics (1976–1979) had Wildcat play a central role as a JSA member, where he defeats Psycho-Pirate.

In Crisis on Infinite Earths, Red Tornado shatters Wildcat's legs, and he is told that he will not regain mobility. His goddaughter Yolanda Montez succeeds him as Wildcat.

=== Post-Crisis ===
Wildcat and Hippolyta as depicted in Wonder Woman (vol. 2) #185 (Nov. 2002). Art by Phil Jimenez.

After the Crisis and its several changes to continuity, the injuries that Ted Grant sustained were downgraded from paraplegia to less severe injuries from which he recovered quickly. He was also still a former heavyweight champion of the world. In addition, Ted is credited with being an expert at combat, though he prefers to trade punches as part of his brawling style. Even in his advanced years, on several occasions Ted has knocked out experienced fighters with a single punch. He remains at the peak of human condition due to his extensive workouts. He retains his status a world-class boxer who trained Batman, Black Canary, and Superman. Grant was, in turn, trained by ex-boxer Joe Morgan, who also tutored Atom and Guardian.

Wildcat and the JSA willingly exile themselves to Limbo to prevent Ragnarök. They remain there for several years until they are freed in Armageddon: Inferno. During the Zero Hour: Crisis in Time! storyline, Wildcat and the JSA are subjected to Extant's time-manipulating powers, which nullifies their slowed aging and restores them to their proper ages.

In the wake of Zero Hour, Ted Grant retires from active crimefighting and again became a full-time trainer in his role as a professional boxer. In private, he continued to train younger superheroes in the martial arts. In addition, new details were revealed about Wildcat's past, one being the existence of two sons. His eldest son Jake was kidnapped by the Yellow Wasp and later murdered by Killer Wasp. His youngest son Tom was raised exclusively by his mother without Ted's knowledge. In the present, Ted has affairs with Selina Kyle and Hippolyta.

It was later revealed that Ted possesses "nine lives", the result of the magician Zatara altering a curse placed upon him by a sorcerer named King Inferno after Ted refused to throw a boxing match for the wizard. The curse was intended to transform him into a cat, but instead gave him nigh-immortality, meaning that he can only die if he is killed nine times in rapid succession.

Wildcat is not present in The New 52 continuity reboot. In Doomsday Clock, this is revealed to be the result of Doctor Manhattan altering the timeline and erasing the Justice Society from existence. After Manhattan undoes his actions, Wildcat and the Society return.

In JSA (2025), Wildcat is killed by Lady Eve. Later in the series, Wildcat is resurrected after becoming the host of the Spectre.

== Powers and abilities ==
Possessing no inherent superpowers, Grant is considered an accomplished boxer and mixed martial artist in peak human condition; he is skilled in various disciplines such as capoeira, hapkido, kickboxing, krav maga, muay thai, taekwondo, and boxing, the last of which he typically favors. In addition to his fighting abilities, Grant is a skilled motorist, investigator specializing in sports crimes, and is a proficient teacher of martial arts, teaching numerous civilians and superheroes alike. Later stories revealed he has a nine lives curse, originating from Zatara's alterations to prevent a transformation into a cat. This grants him virtual immortality unless he is killed nine times in rapid succession.

== Enemies ==
Wildcat had his own rogues gallery during his career:

- Buzzard Bernay – A crooked boxing manager.
- The Caveman – John Grimm is a caveman-themed villain.
- Flint and Skinner – The managers of Ted Grant who orchestrated "Socker" Smith's death.
- Giles and Hogg – Two jewel thieves who pose as private detectives. Their activities lead to Wildcat first meeting "Stretch" Skinner when the jewel thieves try to scam him.
- The Headless Horseman – Van Brunt is a criminal who masquerades as the Headless Horseman.
- The Huntress – A female villain who is the mistress of traps and tracking.
- The Laughing Pirate – A pirate-themed villain.
- The Porker – A crime lord.
- The Purple Mask Gang
- Second Chance – Steve Styles is a criminal who took up the name Second Chance after being saved by Wildcat. He dies when a bullet meant for Wildcat ricochets back at him.
- The Yellow Wasp – A wasp-themed criminal who wields a stinger gun and uses chemicals to control wasps. He went on a crime wave and kidnapped "Stretch" Skinner before being defeated by Wildcat. He later dies at some point and is revealed to be the father of Killer Wasp.

== Other versions ==
- Thomas "Tom" Bronson, also known as Tomcat, is Ted Grant's youngest son and the result of a one-night stand with Marilyn, a maid who secretly had a metahuman gene that allowed her and later Tom to assume a werecat form. Tom was raised distantly from Ted, who was unaware of his powers. Although not present in his life, Tom elects to not hold it against Ted due to his upbringing and differs in being reluctant towards violence. Over time, Tom slowly forms a bond with Ted and eventually, after some initial reluctance, agrees to share the Wildcat name with his father for a time and is later inducted into the Justice Society. He eventually adopts a new codename and becomes a member of the All-Stars, a younger offshoot of the JSA.
- Hector Ramirez first appeared in Batman/Wildcat #1 (April 1997) and was created by Chuck Dixon, Beau Smith, and Sergio Cariello. He was a boxing protégé of Ted Grant. After learning that Ted used to be Wildcat, Hector aspired to be his successor, something that Ted had refused. Hector then took one of Ted's old costumes and went out as Wildcat in Gotham City. In an attempt to break up a secret fight club where caged villains fought to the death, Ramirez was himself caught and later killed by Killer Croc in the ring. The operators Lock-Up and Ernie Chubb were eventually apprehended by Ted and Batman.

=== Yolanda Montez ===
Yolanda Montez as Wildcat.

- First appearance: Infinity Inc. #12 (March, 1985)
- Created by: Roy Thomas; Dann Thomas; Tim Burgard
- Species: Metahuman
- Teams: Infinity, Inc.; Justice Society of America
- Abilities: Skilled hand-to-hand combatant, enhanced speed, agility, and retractable claws

Yolanda Maria Dorothea Lucia Montez (or simply Yolanda Montez) is the Mexican-American superheroine appearing in American comic books published by DC Comics as the second Wildcat. Unlike her predecessor, the character is a metahuman with various cat-related power. These powers originated from human experimentation done to her by Benjamin Love, while her mother was pregnant with her.

First appearing as a journalist with interest in both the Justice Society and Infinity, Inc., she plans to join the former as Wildcat and gets his blessing following an injury wherein he believes he is set to retire. During this time, she joins Infinity, Inc. and has a flirtatious relationship with Nuklon. Yolanda retires after Infinity, Inc. disbands, but resurfaces to fight Eclipso, during which she is killed.

Years after the New 52 reboot, which erased much of the history of the JSA including Yolanda's tenure, her history is restored in Doomsday Clock. Montez alongside Beth Chapel is later resurrected in a precursor to the Lazarus Planet event, now instead joining the Justice Society of America but struggles with Eclipso's influence on her. During a battle with the Legion of Super-Heroes, Yolanda's fate as a host of Eclipso is revealed as Doctor Fate arrives to warn them of a traitor influencing both teams into fighting one another over a past, heroic version of Mordru (known as Legionnaire) attempting to avert his dark future by being a hero. Legionnaire's intervention alongside Huntress's assistance quickly foils his plans. She later helps the Justice Society battle a new iteration of the Injustice Society, with the team caught between an internal strife unknowingly stoked by Johnny Sorrow impersonating Obsidian to create friction. Both killing a Kobra soldier and guilt from Ted's death temporarily shatters her confidence in continuing the role, offering it back to Tom Bronson but he rebuffs it. After Khalid Nassour reminds her of Ted's lessons, she assists the sorcerer in re-claiming his Helmet of Fate and battling the Injustice Society alongside the team once again, with them prevailing thanks to Doctor Fate's efforts.

=== Alternate universe versions ===
- An alternate universe version of Ted Grant / Wildcat from Earth-21 makes cameo appearances in DC: The New Frontier.
- An alternate universe version of Ted Grant / Wildcat from Earth-22 appears in Kingdom Come. This version is a humanoid black panther.
- An alternate universe version of Ted Grant from Earth-72 appears in The Sandman: Worlds' End.
- An alternate universe version of Ted Grant / Wildcat from Earth-2 appears in Earth 2: Worlds' End.
- In the Absolute Universe, Ted Grant briefly donned the Wildcat identity to deal with gangsters in World War 2 but accepted bribe money to go away and focus on his gym.
- In Tangent: Superman's Reign #3, the Wildcat of Earth-9 is a humanoid cat creature and a member of the Nightwing organization's Covert Ops team.
- On Earth-2, a version of Yolanda Montez appears as the Avatar of the Red, a cosmic force connecting animal life. She appears in Earth 2: World's End and Convergence.

== In other media ==
=== Television ===
==== Live-action ====
- The Ted Grant incarnation of Wildcat appears in the Smallville two-part episode "Absolute Justice", portrayed by Roger Hasket. This version is a member of the Justice Society of America (JSA), who were primarily active in the 1970s, until the government forced them to retire from superheroics. Despite this, Grant remained active as a professional boxer.
- Ted Grant appears in the third season of Arrow, portrayed by J. R. Ramirez. This version runs the "Wildcat Gym" as a place to help kids on the streets by training them to box in the hopes it will steer them straight. Additionally, he originally operated as a vigilante who fought street crime in a crime-infested district of Starling City called the Glades, but retired after his partner, Isaac Stanzler, beat someone to death, something he felt was morally wrong.
- The Yolanda Montez and Ted Grant incarnations of Wildcat appear in Stargirl, portrayed by Yvette Monreal and Brian Stapf respectively. As Wildcat, Montez and Grant wear an exo-suit capable of enhancing the wearer's natural athleticism, adjusting to different body types, possesses retractable claws that can pierce metal, and grant precise balance.
  - This version of Montez is a high school student, a fan of Ted Grant and the ex-girlfriend of Henry King Jr. Three months prior to the series, she became an outcast when her rival, Cindy Burman, had leaked revealing photos she had sent to Henry during a school presidential election to ruin her candidacy, which also resulted in her parents revealing their true disgusting natures, as they had started to treat Yolanda quite badly for no clear reason at all and had led to her pouring her frustrations into boxing. Yolanda later takes up Grant's identity of Wildcat at Stargirl's request to help rebuild the Justice Society of America (JSA). Yolanda would later go on to forgive Henry before he is killed by his father, Brainwave, and avenge him by killing the latter. In the second season, Yolanda becomes a part-time waitress, but has PTSD as a result of her killing Brainwave. This eventually leads her to quit the JSA after suffering hallucinations of Henry and Brainwave, although she later agrees to return to help her friends defeat Eclipso. In the third season, Yolanda moves in with Stargirl's family, as she was finally tired of being constantly abused, disrespected and mistreated by her parents, particularly by her mother, Maria. At the end of the third season, Richard Swift has indirectly implied that Yolanda had ultimately decided to press charges for child abuse against both of her parents, after coming to terms with their true natures. Ten years later, Yolanda is still a member of the Justice Society of America.
    - Ahead of the series' premiere, Yolanda and the JSA made a cameo appearance in the Arrowverse crossover "Crisis on Infinite Earths" via archive footage from the Stargirl episode "The Justice Society".

==== Animation ====
- The Ted Grant incarnation of Wildcat appears in Justice League Unlimited, voiced by Dennis Farina.
- The Ted Grant incarnation of Wildcat appears in Batman: The Brave and the Bold, voiced by R. Lee Ermey and he mentored Batman in the art of boxing along with being fatherly to younger superheroes, especially the teenagers. Additionally, an unnamed alternate universe version of Wildcat appears in flashbacks in the episode "Deep Cover for Batman!" as a member of the Injustice Syndicate.
- The Ted Grant incarnation of Wildcat makes a cameo appearance in the Young Justice episode "Humanity".
- The Ted Grant incarnation of Wildcat makes a cameo appearance in the Robot Chicken DC Comics Special, voiced by Matthew Senreich.

=== Film ===
- The Ted Grant incarnation of Wildcat makes a non-speaking appearance in Justice League: The New Frontier as a former member of the Justice Society of America, which disbanded after the death of Hourman.
- An evil version of Wildcat from Earth-Three appears in Justice League: Crisis on Two Earths as a minor member of the Crime Syndicate.
- The Ted Grant incarnation of Wildcat makes a cameo appearance in Teen Titans Go! To the Movies.
- The Ted Grant incarnation of Wildcat appears in Justice League: Crisis on Infinite Earths.
- The Ted Grant incarnation of Wildcat makes a cameo appearance in Superman (2025) via a mural.

=== Video games ===
- The Ted Grant incarnation of Wildcat appears in Batman: The Brave and the Bold – The Videogame, voiced again by R. Lee Ermey.
- The Ted Grant incarnation of Wildcat appears in DC Universe Online, voiced by Ken Webster.
- The Ted Grant incarnation of Wildcat appears as a character summon in Scribblenauts Unmasked: A DC Comics Adventure.

=== Merchandise ===
- The Ted Grant incarnation of Wildcat was the first figure released in the ninth wave of the DC Universe Classics line and was available in his black and blue costumes.
- In 2020, Fisher-Price released a 2.5 inch Wildcat figure as part of their Imaginext DC Super Friends series.

=== Miscellaneous ===
- The Ted Grant incarnation of Wildcat appears in DC Super Hero Girls, voiced by John DiMaggio.
- The Ted Grant incarnation of Wildcat appears in Injustice 2.

== Reception ==
IGN listed Ted Grant as Wildcat as the 71st greatest comic book character of all time stating that, due to his age as a superhero, he is almost more mystifying than the Spectre.
