= Batman (2003 toy line) =

Action figure toyline released by Mattel

- Type: action figures
- Company: Mattel
- Country: USA
- Availability: 2003–Mid 2005
- Materials: plastic

In 2003, DC rewarded the rights to produce Batman, Superman, and Justice League/Justice League Unlimited figures to Mattel. Mattel, who took over production from Hasbro, released their first original comic-style toy line, Batman, in 2003, and it lasted until summer 2005.

== Overview ==
These 6" figures featured around ten points of articulation: swivel neck, waist, gloves and hips, hinged knees, and ball jointed shoulders. The only exceptions are the Robin figure, which lost waist articulation, and the Superman figure who was released in a two-pack with Batman and had new hinged elbows and ankles.

== History ==
The line was released in comic stores in April 2003 and later at mass market retailers in September. The shipment for each wave included: Batman (re-released in later waves), a sidekick (either Robin or Nightwing), a villain, and three variants.

Collectors praised Zipline Batman (the regular version) and the three initial villains: Joker, Mr. Freeze and Killer Croc, though some collectors found that the villains were the hardest to find figures and that the variants were plentiful.

=== Overseas Exclusives ===
In 2005, Mattel shipped the final two villains, Bane and Scarecrow, along with new Batman figures overseas. Mattel attempted plans to ship them to specialty retailers in the US, but the idea never panned out. Fans were mostly disappointed because these figures (Bane, Scarecrow, Attack Armor Batman and Batsignal Batman) had much higher articulation than earlier figures, and Batsignal Batman came with a detailed, functional Batsignal that was not accessible to US collectors.

== Revival/DC Superheroes ==
After Christmas 2005, Mattel released Batsignal Batman (without the Batsignal accessory), Bane, Scarecrow, and re-released Killer Croc in the US mass market under the new toy line DC Super Heroes. Batman had the accessories that came with the San Diego Comic-Con '03 Batman figure, a rubber cape (from the SDCC '04 exclusive), and a new paint application. Bane had open hands and some variant figures came with Osito, his teddy bear. Killer Croc came with a new head sculpt, a new paint job, no tail, and his shirt was removed. Scarecrow no longer featured his action feature, a "twist and strike" waist that springs back to center when it turns to the side and release.

== SDCC Exclusives ==
The line had two San Diego Comic-Con exclusives: one in 2003 and one in 2004.

=== 2003 ===
The Batman figure was based on the art of Neal Adams. This figure was a retooled Zipline Batman with a new belt, a thicker cape (blue on the outside and black on the inside), a Silver Age accurate paint application, and three accessories: a Batarang, Grapple Gun, and handcuffs.

=== 2004 ===
This exclusive Batman figure featured Batman in the act of removing his cowl and had two chase variants. The figure featured new arms and head and was painted to match Zipline Batman. The first variant was Batman with a fully removed cowl. The second was a battle damaged version of that figure. All three figures had a black rubber cape.

== Recall ==
The Batmobile (toy no. B4944) was recalled due to a potential injury hazard. The rear tail wings of the Batmobile were made of rigid plastic and came to a sharp point. This posed a risk of puncture or laceration to young children. Mattel received reports of 14 injuries, including scrapes, scratches, lacerations, and punctures. Four of these injuries required medical treatment. As a result of these reports, Mattel voluntarily recalled 314,000 of these Batmobiles.

== See also ==
- Mattel
- DC Comics
- Batman
- Superman
- Justice League
- Action Figure
