= List of Justice League episodes =

Promotional image of the Justice League by Bruce Timm

Justice League is an American animated series about a team of superheroes, which ran from 2001 to 2004 on Cartoon Network. The series is based on the Justice League and associated comic book characters published by DC Comics. It follows the adventures of Superman, Batman, Wonder Woman, Green Lantern, The Flash, Hawkgirl, and Martian Manhunter. The series was immediately followed by Justice League Unlimited (2004–2006).

== Series overview ==
Season	Episodes	Originally released	
Season	Episodes	First released	Last released
1	26	November 17, 2001	November 9, 2002
2	26	July 5, 2003	May 29, 2004

== Episode list ==
=== Season 1 (2001–2002) ===
No. overall	No. in season	Title	Directed by	Written by	Original release date	U.S. viewers (millions)
1	1	"Secret Origins"	Dan Riba	Rich Fogel	November 17, 2001	4.32
2	2	"Secret Origins"	Butch Lukic	Rich Fogel	November 17, 2001	4.32
3	3	"Secret Origins"	Dan Riba	Rich Fogel	November 17, 2001	4.32
As alien invaders who were accidentally awakened on Mars begin to take over the Earth, Superman and Batman rescue Martian Manhunter, who telepathically summons Wonder Woman, Hawkgirl, the Flash, and Green Lantern to help stop the invasion. Superman gathers everyone at the newly built Watchtower, funded by Batman, and asks them to be part of a team, which he dubs the Justice League. Note: This episode is adapted from the JLA: Year One maxi-series (January–December 1998), written by Mark Waid and Brian Augustyn and illustrated by Barry Kitson and the "New World Order" storyline from JLA #1–4 (November 1996–April 1997) written by Grant Morrison and illustrated by Howard Porter.
4	4	"In Blackest Night"	Butch Lukic	Stan Berkowitz	November 19, 2001	N/A
5	5	"In Blackest Night"	Butch Lukic	Stan Berkowitz	November 26, 2001	N/A
Green Lantern surrenders himself to robotic Manhunters to stand trial for the destruction of a planet. While Flash acts as Green Lantern's attorney, the rest of the League discovers that Kanjar Ro helped the Manhunters frame Green Lantern in a bid to steal the Green Lantern power battery. Note: This episode is adapted from the stories "No Man Escapes the Manhunter!"/"No World Escapes The Manhunters!" from Justice League of America #140-141 (March–April 1977), written by Steve Englehart and illustrated by Dick Dillin and uses elements from the Cosmic Odyssey miniseries (December 1988–March 1989) written by Jim Starlin and illustrated by Mike Mignola.
6	6	"The Enemy Below"	Dan Riba	Kevin Hopps	December 3, 2001	N/A
7	7	"The Enemy Below"	Dan Riba	Kevin Hopps	December 10, 2001	N/A
A nuclear submarine is attacked in the Atlantic, forcing the League to come face-to-face with Aquaman and his Atlantean army. Aquaman follows Superman's advice to go to Metropolis and take his problems up with the various governments of the world. When a mercenary, Deadshot, attacks Aquaman, the League steps in. Aquaman discovers that Orm, his brother, was behind the attack. Orm takes Aquaman and his infant son and places them on a cliff over a vein of molten lava, leaving them to die. To save his son, Aquaman sacrifices his own hand.
8	8	"Paradise Lost"	Dan Riba	Joseph Kuhr	January 21, 2002	N/A
9	9	"Paradise Lost"	Dan Riba	Joseph Kuhr	January 28, 2002	N/A
Having spent nearly eight months with the League and feeling she owes her mother Hippolyta an explanation for her leaving Themyscira abruptly to fight in the Imperium invasion, Wonder Woman returns to her home only to encounter the sorcerer Felix Faust, who has petrified the Amazons and will not return them to normal unless she gathers artifacts for him. Faust uses the artifacts to release Hades from Tartarus. The League succeeds in exiling Hades and his minions, but Wonder Woman is exiled from Themyscira for allowing the men of the Justice League to help.
10	10	"War World"	Butch Lukic	Stan Berkowitz	February 24, 2002	N/A
11	11	"War World"	Butch Lukic	Stan Berkowitz	March 3, 2002	N/A
Superman and Martian Manhunter are abducted by alien slave traders and transported to Warworld, whose ruler Mongul pits aliens against each other in gladiatorial combat. Hawkgirl and Green Lantern set out to rescue them. During this time, Superman meets Draaga, who is chosen to become Warworld's leader after Mongul is defeated. Note: This episode is based on the "Superman: Exile" storyline (February–July 1989).
12	12	"The Brave and the Bold"	Dan Riba	Story by : Rich Fogel and Paul Dini; Teleplay by : Dwayne McDuffie	March 10, 2002	1.02
13	13	"The Brave and the Bold"	Dan Riba	Story by : Rich Fogel and Paul Dini; Teleplay by : Dwayne McDuffie	March 17, 2002	N/A
The Flash and Green Lantern uncover a plot by Gorilla Grodd to destroy Gorilla City, a hidden city in Africa inhabited by intelligent gorillas. Grodd has a device that allows him to control the minds of others and uses stolen gorilla technology to conquer Central City and put its inhabitants under his control. Locked inside the city, Flash and Green Lantern work with Solovar, Gorilla City's chief of security, to stop Grodd before he carries out his revenge.
14	14	"Fury"	Butch Lukic	Story by : Stan Berkowitz; Teleplay by : Dwayne McDuffie	April 7, 2002	2.26
15	15	"Fury"	Butch Lukic	Story by : Stan Berkowitz; Teleplay by : Dwayne McDuffie	April 14, 2002	N/A
A rogue Amazonian named Aresia, who was born in the mortal world and raised on Themyscira, forms another incarnation of the Injustice Gang with Star Sapphire, Shade, Copperhead, Solomon Grundy, and a new villain named Tsukuri. She sets out to steal a ruby to use it as a virus to kill the world's male population, whom she holds responsible for the death of her family in a war. When the male members of the League are infected by the virus, putting them out of commission, Wonder Woman and Hawkgirl must work with Hippolyta to stop Aresia.
16	16	"Legends"	Dan Riba	Andrew Kreisberg	April 21, 2002	2.82
17	17	"Legends"	Dan Riba	Andrew Kreisberg	April 28, 2002	N/A
Flash, Green Lantern, Martian Manhunter, and Hawkgirl are accidentally transported to a parallel world and discover the Justice Guild of America, who are comic book characters in the Justice League's world. As they traverse this world and help the Justice Guild of America fight the Injustice Guild, they soon discover that not everything is what it seems since the end of their comic series. Note: The episode is dedicated to Gardner Fox, a Golden and Silver Age comic writer who co-created the Justice Society of America and the Justice League. The episode draws inspiration from The Flash #123 story "Flash of Two Worlds" (September 1961) written by Fox and illustrated by Carmine Infantino. Originally, the showrunners wanted to use the JSA, but DC Comics publisher Paul Levitz felt that the story was inappropriate, so they altered the names and designs of the team.
18	18	"Injustice for All"	Butch Lukic	Stan Berkowitz	September 6, 2002	N/A
19	19	"Injustice for All"	Butch Lukic	Stan Berkowitz	September 13, 2002	N/A
Exposed as a criminal, sentenced to prison, and terminally ill due to long-term Kryptonite exposure, Lex Luthor escapes and assembles a supervillain team, the Injustice Gang, to take on the Justice League. The gang consists of Cheetah, Star Sapphire, Shade, Copperhead, Ultra-Humanite, and Solomon Grundy. Joker also becomes part of the team, on his own initiative and due to his expertise on Batman. Even with their combined power, however, the gang proves no match for Batman's guile. Note: This episode is based from the "Rock of Ages" storyline from JLA #10–15 (September 1997–February 1998) written by Grant Morrison and illustrated by Howard Porter.
20	20	"A Knight of Shadows"	Butch Lukic	Keith Damron	September 20, 2002	N/A
21	21	"A Knight of Shadows"	Butch Lukic	Keith Damron	September 27, 2002	N/A
Jason Blood and his alter-ego Etrigan the Demon seek the assistance of the Justice League in preventing the Philosopher's Stone from falling into the hands of his ancient enemy, the sorceress Morgaine le Fey.
22	22	"Metamorphosis"	Dan Riba	Len Uhley	October 4, 2002	N/A
23	23	"Metamorphosis"	Dan Riba	Story by : Len Uhley; Teleplay by : Dwayne McDuffie	October 11, 2002	N/A
Green Lantern's old friend Rex Mason, now working for a shady industrialist, suffers an "accident" arranged by his jealous employer Simon Stagg and is transformed into the superhero Metamorpho.
24	24	"The Savage Time"	Butch Lukic	Stan Berkowitz	November 9, 2002	N/A
25	25	"The Savage Time"	Dan Riba	Stan Berkowitz	November 9, 2002	N/A
26	26	"The Savage Time"	Butch Lukic	Stan Berkowitz	November 9, 2002	N/A
The Justice League returns from a mission in space to find the world transformed due to Vandal Savage altering history, allowing him and the Nazis to win World War II. Finding the machine Savage used to send his past self information, the League uses it to travel back in time to stop him and fight Nazis alongside WWII-era heroes Easy Company, the Blackhawks, and Steve Trevor.

=== Season 2 (2003–2004) ===
Starting this season, the episodes were produced in 16:9 widescreen which were letterboxed in 4:3 when broadcast.

No. overall	No. in season	Title	Directed by	Written by	Original release date
27	1	"Twilight"	Dan Riba	Rich Fogel and Bruce Timm	July 5, 2003
28	2	"Twilight"	Butch Lukic	Rich Fogel and Bruce Timm	July 5, 2003
The League is tricked into defending Darkseid's homeworld of Apokolips against Brainiac, despite Superman's skepticism and his anger at their previous encounter. The team solicits the aid of the New Gods, including Orion, Lightray, and Highfather. In the ensuing battle, Brainiac and Darkseid are presumed dead, though Superman believes otherwise.
29	3	"Tabula Rasa"	Dan Riba	Stan Berkowitz	October 4, 2003
30	4	"Tabula Rasa"	Dan Riba	Stan Berkowitz	October 4, 2003
Lex Luthor manipulates a powerful android named Amazo with the ability to copy any superpower, posing as a father figure to it. Meanwhile, Martian Manhunter questions the nature of humans and struggles with the burden of hearing thousands of their minds in his head at once, after performing a psychic sweep of Metropolis in a failed attempt to locate Luthor. After gaining Manhunter's telepathy, Amazo discovers that Luthor was using him and leaves Earth to discover his purpose.
31	5	"Only a Dream"	Butch Lukic	Stan Berkowitz	October 11, 2003
32	6	"Only a Dream"	Butch Lukic	Stan Berkowitz	October 11, 2003
Small time crook John Dee volunteers for an experimental treatment while in prison. While the authorities are distracted by a mass prison break led by Volcana, Luminus, Copperhead, Solomon Grundy and Firefly, John Dee overdoses on the treatment and becomes the dream-controlling Doctor Destiny. Destiny takes telepathic control of most of the League in their sleep and puts them in nightmares. This leaves only Batman and Martian Manhunter left. Martian Manhunter tries to force them awake, while Batman, resisting sleep, goes to confront Destiny.
33	7	"Maid of Honor"	Dan Riba	Dwayne McDuffie	October 18, 2003
34	8	"Maid of Honor"	Dan Riba	Dwayne McDuffie	October 18, 2003
Wonder Woman befriends Audrey, the princess of Kasnia, who is reluctant to end her wild ways to get married. Unfortunately, her fiancé is Vandal Savage, and he already has plans for both the throne and the Justice League. Wonder Woman and Batman must stop Savage, while Flash, Green Lantern, and Martian Manhunter take out Savage's new Rail Gun satellite.
35	9	"Hearts and Minds"	Butch Lukic	Keith Damron	October 25, 2003
36	10	"Hearts and Minds"	Butch Lukic	Keith Damron	October 25, 2003
Kilowog crashes to Earth, seeking Green Lantern's help to rescue other members of the Green Lantern Corps from the psychic conqueror Despero. He also explains that Green Lantern's former mentor and lover, Katma Tui, is one of the captives. After facing Despero and losing, Green Lantern has to retrain himself to use his power ring to help the League end Despero's reign. Flash, Hawkgirl and Martian Manhunter accompany Kilowog to Despero's planet to help Green Lantern stop him. Note: This episode is somewhat based from the Green Lantern: Ganthet's Tale graphic novel (November 1992), written by Larry Niven and illustrated by John Byrne.
37	11	"A Better World"	Dan Riba	Stan Berkowitz	November 1, 2003
38	12	"A Better World"	Dan Riba	Stan Berkowitz	November 1, 2003
In an alternate reality, the Justice League launches an assault on the White House, where Superman kills President Luthor in retaliation for the Flash's execution by Luthor. Two years later, the League, now called the Justice Lords, have become tyrannical rulers. After Justice Lord Batman creates a method of dimensional travel, the Lords travel to the main universe and replace the League, attempting to make this Earth like their own. After finding their way back to their world, the Justice League ends up having to turn to their world's version of Lex Luthor for help. Note: This episode is adapted from the stories "Crisis on Earth-Three!"/"The Most Dangerous Earth of All" from Justice League of America #29-30 (August–September 1964), written by Gardner Fox and illustrated by Mike Sekowsky, as well as the JLA: Earth 2 graphic novel (September 2000) written by Grant Morrison and illustrated by Frank Quitely.
39	13	"Eclipsed"	Dan Riba	Joseph Kuhr	November 8, 2003
40	14	"Eclipsed"	Dan Riba	Joseph Kuhr	November 8, 2003
An ancient lunar crystal called the Black Heart is discovered. Unbeknownst to the members of the Justice League, it harbors an evil snake spirit with the ability to possess its bearer. The crystal's power contaminates almost all of the League, except for the Flash, who must save the League from a weapon that will destroy both the Sun and the Earth.
41	15	"The Terror Beyond"	Butch Lukic	Dwayne McDuffie	November 15, 2003
42	16	"The Terror Beyond"	Butch Lukic	Dwayne McDuffie	November 15, 2003
Doctor Fate and Aquaman rescue Solomon Grundy, intent on using him to help battle an ancient evil. Superman, Hawkgirl and Wonder Woman are conflicted about this goal. Note: The pairing of these heroes is an homage to the Marvel Comics superhero team the Defenders. The plot is based upon H. P. Lovecraft's Cthulhu Mythos.
43	17	"Secret Society"	Dan Riba	Stan Berkowitz	November 22, 2003
44	18	"Secret Society"	Dan Riba	Stan Berkowitz	November 22, 2003
While the Justice League are quarreling about the value of mutual trust and teamwork, Gorilla Grodd organizes a Secret Society composed of Giganta, Killer Frost, Sinestro, Parasite, Shade, and Clayface. The Society captures most of the League, but Martian Manhunter frees the others, and the Society is defeated in front of a crowded stadium.
45	19	"Hereafter"	Butch Lukic	Dwayne McDuffie	November 29, 2003
46	20	"Hereafter"	Butch Lukic	Dwayne McDuffie	November 29, 2003
A band of supervillains (composed of Metallo, Kalibak, Livewire, Weather Wizard, and Toyman) team up to get revenge on Superman. When they attack Metropolis, Superman sacrifices himself to save Batman and Wonder Woman from Toyman's weapon and is seemingly vaporized. The League attempts to cope with the loss of Superman by defending Metropolis in his absence, save for Batman, who does not believe Superman is dead and begins investigating what happened. Unbeknownst to the League, Superman is transported 30,000 years in the future, where Vandal Savage has devastated Earth with a gravitational weapon. Superman works with Savage to return to the present and stop Savage's past self, altering the timeline and erasing the bad future. Note: Superman's funeral is adapted from the "Funeral for a Friend" storyline (January–June 1993).
47	21	"Wild Cards"	Butch Lukic	Stan Berkowitz & Dwayne McDuffie	December 6, 2003
48	22	"Wild Cards"	Butch Lukic	Stan Berkowitz & Dwayne McDuffie	December 6, 2003
With his Gwynplaine Entertainment Company (a reference to The Man Who Laughs) the Joker takes over TV stations in Las Vegas, announcing that he has placed a series of bombs that will destroy the Las Vegas Strip if they are not stopped by the Justice League. With the whole world watching, the League must first get past the Joker's own super-team, the Royal Flush Gang. However, the threat imposed by the Joker is not as simple as it seems, and Batman must track down his location to stop him. Note: This episode is notable as a 'hidden crossover' with Teen Titans, as the Royal Flush Gang is voiced by the five principal actors from that series. The gang's designs are also based on the Teen Titans voice actors.
49	23	"Comfort and Joy"	Butch Lukic	Paul Dini	December 13, 2003
After saving two worlds, the members of the Justice League decide to take a break to celebrate the holidays. The Flash spends his Christmas Eve with the children of an orphanage, who ask that he find them a special animated toy duck. The popular toy is broken by the Ultra-Humanite, who eventually comes around and helps The Flash. Green Lantern and Hawkgirl show each other how they spend the holidays. Green Lantern engages in a snowball fight with Hawkgirl. Hawkgirl responds by starting an interplanetary barroom brawl. Batman spends Christmas on Watchtower duty. Meanwhile, Superman invites Martian Manhunter over to Smallville for Christmas Eve with his adoptive parents. Although Martian Manhunter is initially uncomfortable, he eventually learns to enjoy Christmas.
50	24	"Starcrossed"	Butch Lukic	Rich Fogel	May 29, 2004
51	25	"Starcrossed"	Dan Riba	Story by : Rich Fogel; Teleplay by : John Ridley	May 29, 2004
52	26	"Starcrossed"	Butch Lukic	Rich Fogel & Dwayne McDuffie	May 29, 2004
After Earth is attacked by a Gordanian battleship, the League is aided by soldiers from Hawkgirl's home planet of Thanagar. The Thanagarians offer to build a shield to defend Earth against the Gordanians, but Batman discovers that this is a ruse: the Thanagarians intend to build a portal to attack the Gordanian homeworld, which would destroy Earth. Hawkgirl finds herself torn between her allegiance to Thanagar and her commitment to the Justice League, as well as between her betrothal to her commander Hro Talak and her love for Green Lantern.

=== Static Shock crossovers ===
Note: Chronologically, these episodes take place prior to "Starcrossed", as they make use of the original Watchtower and Shayera Hol still uses her "Hawkgirl" cover.

No. overall	No. in season	Title	Directed by	Written by	Original release date
30	S03E06	"A League of Their Own"	Uncredited	Ernie Altbacker; Dwayne McDuffie (Part 2)	March 1, 2003
31	S03E07	"A League of Their Own"	Uncredited	Ernie Altbacker; Dwayne McDuffie (Part 2)	March 8, 2003
When the Watchtower has a sudden power drain, the Justice League recruits Static to jump start their station before it reenters the atmosphere. Unbeknownst to either Static or Gear, the power drain also releases Brainiac from his confinement. Static and Gear manage to bring Brainiac down, but he escapes and possesses Gear and the Justice League.
43	S04E04	"Fallen Hero"	Chuck Drost	Stan Berkowitz	February 7, 2004
Static faces off against his idol Green Lantern (actually Sinestro in disguise) when he causes chaos all over town. Note: Although this is a crossover with Justice League, only Green Lantern appears.

== Other ==
Two spin-off comic book series (Justice League Adventures and Justice League Unlimited) were loosely set in the same continuity as the animated series. They feature characters who never appeared on the animated series such as Blue Beetle, Mary Marvel, Power Girl, Black Lightning and Firestorm. Power Girl's inclusion renders the issues out of continuity once Justice League Unlimited introduced Galatea into the animated series.

Matt Wayne (who wrote "Chaos at the Earth's Core", "Flash and Substance", and "Patriot Act") wrote issues 37 and 38 of the comic, based on unused episode ideas.
