= Hawkman (Katar Hol) =

DC Comics superhero

- Hawkman with Atom. Art by Alex Ross

Publication information
- Publisher: DC Comics
- First appearance: The Brave and the Bold #34 (February–March 1961)
- Created by: Gardner Fox; Joe Kubert; Revamped by: Timothy Truman

In-story information
- Full name: Katar Hol
- Species: Thanagarian (current) Human/Thanagarian hybrid (originally)
- Place of origin: Thanagar
- Team affiliations: Elite Hawkmen Force; Justice League; Justice League America; Justice League of America; Justice League United; Justice League International
- Partnerships: Hawkwoman; Atom (Ray Palmer); Adam Strange
- Notable aliases: Carter Hall
- Abilities: Flight (via artificial wings and anti-gravity belt); Enhanced strength, vision, and endurance; Able to communicate with and summon birds

Hawkman (Katar Hol) is a superhero appearing in American comic books published by DC Comics. He is the version of Hawkman featured in their eras known to fans as the Silver Age, Bronze Age and New 52.

Created by Gardner Fox and Joe Kubert, he first appeared in The Brave and the Bold #34 (February–March 1961). There are two versions of Katar Hol with different origin stories and continuities: the first version appeared from the 1960s (Silver Age/pre-Crisis version), and the second version appears from the 1990s (post-Hawkworld/post-Crisis).

== Publication history ==
The Silver Age Hawkman (Katar Hol) was first introduced in The Brave and the Bold #34 by artist Joe Kubert and writer Gardner Fox in 1961. DC in this era rebooted many of its existing superhero characters, such as the Flash and Green Lantern, who had fallen out of popularity during the 1960s. New versions of these characters often featured science fiction elements, in contrast to earlier stories about mysticism and the supernatural.

The new Hawkman's first appearance sold well and spawned five more tryout issues in The Brave and the Bold. During these issues, he teamed up with his wife, Hawkgirl, to battle foes on earth as well as on his home planet Thanagar.

The Brave and the Bold #36 (1961). Art by Joe Kubert

After Hawkman appearances in The Brave and the Bold, he starred in a side strip within Mystery in Space. He appeared in four issues of this series, and teamed up with Adam Strange in some of these adventures.

In 1964, Hawkman was given a bi-monthly solo title. Murphy Anderson took over the art for this series with Gardner Fox continuing as writer. Hawkman occasionally teamed up with Atom and Strange in his title. Together, Hawkman and Hawkgirl battled such enemies as the Matter Master, the Shadow Thief and Lion-Mane. Hawkman's comic book continued for less than five years before it was canceled at issue #27.

After declining sales forced the cancellation of his solo magazine, Hawkman teamed up with the Atom and starred in The Atom and Hawkman for seven issues. This series was canceled as well.

During the 1970s and early 1980s, Hawkman continued to appear as a member of the Justice League of America, which he had joined back in 1964. He also made regular appearances in World's Finest Comics and Detective Comics, along with a three-issue story in the pages of Showcase. It was not until the mid-1980s when Hawkman received his own title again. In 1986, DC published a four-part miniseries called, The Shadow War of Hawkman. Due to the decent sales of this series, Hawkman received another monthly solo series. It lasted seventeen issues and one Special before it, too, was cancelled.

In 1989, Timothy Truman decided to reboot the Silver Age Hawkman in a three-book series titled Hawkworld. This was the start of the post-Hawkworld version of Katar Hol. While this series was originally meant to just be a retold origin of Hawkman, it spawned yet another Hawkman series. In 1990 DC created the Hawkworld monthly series. This series had two volumes, but was eventually canceled.

During the mid 1990s–2010s, Hawkman was appeared occasionally in various series, but found little popularity with readers. The character’s origin and story had become rather complicated and confusing. Eventually Hawkman came back, but this time, rather than being the alien policeman that he was in the previous series, he was Carter Hall, the reincarnated Egyptian prince featured in the character’s first 1940s era. However this added even more complexity to Hawkman’s origin and the series was canceled.

In 2011, the Silver Age Hawkman was rebooted again as part of The New 52 reboot. His new comic book was titled The Savage Hawkman. Although this Hawkman was the most simple version of the complex character, the series sold poorly and ended after twenty issues. In 2016, Hawkman returned again as part of the DC Rebirth relaunch, in a series titled The Death of Hawkman, which concluded after six issues.

A new Hawkman title, by Robert Venditti and Bryan Hitch, debuted in June 2018. The series focuses on Carter Hall, the reincarnated Egyptian prince version of Hawkman, rather than Katar Hol.

== Fictional character biography ==
=== Silver Age version ===
Katar Hol was the imperial prince of his home planet of Thanagar. His father was Paran Katar, renowned ornithologist and inventor.

When Katar Hol was eighteen, an alien race called the Manhawks invaded Thanagar and began looting the planet. Paran sent young Katar Hol to infiltrate their nest and bring back information on the aliens. Using this information, Paran created a hawk-like battle suit containing advanced technology like his "Nth metal". Katar used this hawk-suit and Paran's advanced weaponry to drive the Manhawks away from Thanagar.

That, however, was not the end of the problem. Some Thanagarians had learned the concept of stealing from the Manhawks. Due to the amount of crime, the Thanagarian government created a police force. In honor of Paran Katar and his achievements, the new police force began using his hawk-suit and equipment. Paran headed this new police force, named the Hawk-Police (or Wingmen), and his son became one of the first recruits.

Katar soon became one of the most skilled of the Hawk-Police. When a group called the Rainbow Robbers began committing crimes, Katar was teamed up with rookie Shayera Thal to track and apprehend the criminals. During the case, Shayera saved Katar's life, and the two soon fell in love. A few weeks later, Katar proposed to Shayera and the two got married, working together as partners-for-life in the Hawk-Police.

After ten years of marriage and in the force, the pair were sent to Earth to capture the shape-shifting Thanagarian criminal Byth Rok. During their mission, they meet George Emmett, commissioner of the Midway City Police Department, and told him their alien origin. With Emmett's help, the pair took over his retiring brother Ed's place as museum curators. They adopt the identities as Carter and Shiera Hall. After capturing him and sending him back to Thanagar, they elected to remain on Earth to work with authorities to learn human police methods. The two acted publicly as the heroes Hawkman and Hawkgirl (later Hawkwoman).

The Silver Age Katar Hol in Hawkman #12 (February–March 1966). Art by Murphy Anderson.

The rest of Hawkman's supporting cast consist of Mavis Trent, museum naturalist and diorama artist who flirts with Katar; Joe Tracy, the museum's publicist; his commanding officer Andar Pul; a large red hawk named Big Red who lives in nearby Hawk Valley; and teenage orphan Charley Parker, the Golden Eagle. Katar gained a variety of unique villainous opponents such as the Shadow Thief, the Matter Master, Ira Quimby (I.Q.), Konrad Kaslak, Chac, the Raven, the Criminal Alliance of the World (or C.A.W.), Lion-Mane, Kanjar Ro, Hyathis, Fadeaway Man, and Gentleman Ghost.

Katar joined the Justice League of America, where he befriended the Atom. As Hawkman was a conservative, he frequently verbally sparred with his fellow Leaguer Green Arrow, a left-wing liberal.

Hol left the Justice League for a time when Thanagar was hit by the Equalizer Plague, which caused all Thanagarians to change so that their physical and mental talents, and even their heights, became the same. With the help of the JLA, he was eventually able to reverse the effects of the plague.

However, in the wake of the plague, Thanagar adopted an expansionist outlook, and went to war with the planet Rann, which orbits Alpha Centauri. This forced Katar and Shayera to choose to fight for or against their own planet, and they elected to oppose Thanagar, becoming exiles on Earth. Around this time, Shayera herself joined the JLA, and took the name Hawkwoman.

Following the truce between Thanagar and Rann, Thanagar began to secretly try to take over the Earth. Hol opposed their efforts in a furtive "secret war" for several years.

Following the events of DC's miniseries Crisis on Infinite Earths, the histories of Earth-One and Earth-Two are merged. As a result, both Golden Age and Silver Age versions of Hawkman and Hawkgirl/Hawkwoman live on the same Earth. Initially, the Silver Age Hawkman and Hawkwoman were kept in continuity unchanged. They took Superman to Krypton, briefly joined Justice League International, teamed-up with Atom, and helped Animal Man defuse a Thanagarian bomb during Invasion. However, DC reversed this decision and rebooted Hawkman continuity after the 1989 Hawkworld miniseries. Originally, Hawkworld retold the origins of the Silver Age Hawkman and Hawkwoman, but following its success, DC Comics launched a Hawkworld ongoing series set in the present, resulting in a complete reboot of Hawkman continuity. By doing so, several continuity errors regarding Hawkman and Hawkwoman's Justice League appearances needed to be fixed.

=== Post-Hawkworld version ===
Katar Hol was rebooted in 1989 in the prestige format miniseries Hawkworld by Timothy Truman. A regular ongoing series of the same name followed from 1990 to 1993, which was then followed up by Hawkman (vol. 3) from 1993 to 1996.

Katar Hol and Shayera Hol. Art by Graham Nolan.

In this new version, Katar Hol was a young police officer on the planet Thanagar, and a child of a privileged family being the son of Paran Katar. Thanagar was a planet which conquered and mined other worlds for their resources to maintain its high standard of living, and Hol realized that this was wrong. He rebelled against the system and favored the old days of Thanagar. He became a student of history and archaeology, and admired Thanagar's legendary hero Kalmoran. Hol became addicted to a recreational drug, was manipulated by the renegade police captain Byth into killing his father, and was sent into exile in the Isle of Chance.

During that time, he found one of the island residents in robes fashioned a pair of wings. Katar, disillusioned, killed him and took his wings. He learned the wings were meant for Hol and that the robed man had natural wings on his back. Horrified on what he has done, the brother of the man he killed helped him deal with withdrawal symptoms from his drug addictions and he made peace with himself.

When his sentence was up, Hol was sent to Downside. However, he managed to escape and uncover and defeat Byth, who had gained shape-shifting abilities. As a result, he was reinstated in the force and given a new partner, Shayera Thal - a young woman from a lower class of society.

Just after Fel Andar left Earth, Katar and Shayera were sent to Earth, where they served as goodwill ambassadors for their home planet and remained for some time fighting both human and alien criminals in places like Chicago's Netherworld. Dubbed by the press as Hawkman III, Katar and Shayera, Hawkwoman II, had a tempestuous working relationship, and eventually, Shayera broke away from Katar, who continued alone.

Katar met Carter Hall and Shiera Sanders, who returned from Asgard with the rest of the Justice Society. He learns that his father came to Earth during World War II, under the alias "Perry Carter". The Golden Age Hawks, Carter and Shiera Hall, were friends with Paran, and were the inspiration of the Wingmen. In one adventure, Carter took an injured Katar to be healed by an old friend, a Cherokee shaman named Naomi ("Faraway Woman"). Katar discovers that she had known Paran Katar, his father. She and Paran fell in love, and the two eloped with the Halls serving as witnesses.

During the Zero Hour: Crisis in Time! event, Katar Hol was merged with Carter, Shiera, and a "hawk god" creature in a new Hawkman version—a living avatar of the hawk god who adventured for a brief time, continuing to prey on criminals and deal out his own brand of justice. He later went insane and was banished to Limbo by Arion and Martian Manhunter.

=== The New 52 version ===
As part of DC's 2011 company-wide title relaunch, The New 52, Katar Hol was re-established as the DCU's Hawkman, using the name Carter Hall. He is unaware of his alien heritage, believing himself to be human. Issue #0 explains that Katar Hol was once a proud member of the Thanagarian race, adopted son of their king Thal Provis and lover to the princess Shayera Thal. Unlike other Thanagarians, he was a pacifist; desiring to find an end to centuries of war, he convinced the king to hold a peace conference. However the Daemonites took advantage of this to spread a deadly disease that destroyed the Thanagarians' wings and killed their king. The new ruler, son of Provis and Katar's adoptive brother, Corsar, came to believe that only the Nth Metal could save them, but this desire for power sacrificed hundreds of lives, which was apparently rewarded when Katar was accidentally fused with it, creating a full body armor and regenerating his wings. Seeing his brother's increasing insanity, Katar refused to let the metal power be distributed, leading to fighting between them and the death of Corsar. Shayera then vows to hunt down Hawkman, also blaming him for her father's death. He runs away in a stolen ship that ends up crashing on earth. During the Rotworld storyline, Animal Man travels to a post-apocalyptic future where he is attacked by a Rot-corrupted Hawkman; this version is killed by Steel, Beast Boy, and Black Orchid.

=== Death of Hawkman ===
Thanagarians attack the royal house of Rann and seemingly murders Sardath. With assistance from Hawkman, Adam Strange determines that the real culprit is Despero. Using his psionic powers, Despero controls the citizens of Rann, Thanagar, and Kalanor as part of a plan to attack Earth. Hawkman sacrifices himself to defeat Despero, who is banished to the edge of the universe.

== Other versions ==
- An alternate universe version of Katar Hol / Hawkman appears in Justice.
- The Earth-One incarnation of Katar Hol / Hawkman appears in Legend of the Hawkman.
- An alternate universe version of Katar Hol / Hawkman appears in JLA: The Nail, where he is killed by Amazo.
- An alternate universe version of Katar Hol / Hawkman appears in The Dark Knight Strikes Again. He and Shayera Hol flee to Costa Rica to escape Lex Luthor's military dictatorship, only to be killed in a military strike. The two's son, Hawkboy, is raised in the jungle and later kills Luthor.
- Katar Hol / Hawkman makes a cameo appearance in Adventures in the DC Universe 80-Page Giant.
- Katar Hol / Hawkman makes a cameo appearance in The Kingdom: Planet Krypton #1.
- Katar Hol / Hawkman makes a cameo appearance in "Whatever Happened to the Man of Tomorrow?".
- Katar Hol / Hawkman makes a cameo appearance in JLA/Avengers.
- Katar Hol / Hawkman makes a cameo appearance in JLA: Created Equal.
- Katar Hol / Hawkman appears in Scooby-Doo! Team Up #33.
- Katar Hol / Hawkman makes a cameo appearance in Superman & Batman Magazine #5.

== In other media ==
=== Television ===
- Katar Hol / Hawkman appears in The Superman/Aquaman Hour of Adventure, voiced by Vic Perrin. This version is a member of the Justice League who wields a wrist-mounted "power claw" instead of archaic weapons. Additionally, he has an eagle sidekick named Skreal and is a scientist under the alias of Carter Hall.
- Katar Hol / Hawkman appears in Super Friends, voiced by Jack Angel. This version is a member of the titular team.
- Katar Hol / Hawkman appears in Legends of the Superheroes, portrayed by Bill Nuckols.
- A loose adaptation of Katar Hol named Hro Talak appears in the Justice League episode "Starcrossed", voiced by Victor Rivers. He is a Thanagarian general and Hawkgirl's former commanding officer and lover. Talak is later killed in a Gordanian attack prior to the events of the Justice League Unlimited episode "Hunter's Moon".
- Katar Hol / Hawkman appears in The Batman, voiced by Robert Patrick.
- Katar Hol / Hawkman appears in DC Super Friends: The Joker's Playhouse, voiced by David Kaye.
- Katar Hol / Hawkman appears in Young Justice, voiced by James Arnold Taylor. This version is a member of the Justice League. Additionally, Hro Talak appears in the third season, voiced by Mark Rolston.
- Katar Hol / Hawkman appears in DC Super Friends (2015), voiced by Sean Schemmel.
- Katar Hol / Hawkman appears in Justice League Action, voiced by Troy Baker.
- Katar Hol / Hawkman appears in Teen Titans Go!, voiced by Fred Tatasciore.

=== Film ===
- Katar Hol / Hawkman makes a cameo appearance in Justice League: The New Frontier.
- Katar Hol / Hawkman makes minor non-speaking appearances in the DC Animated Movie Universe (DCAMU) films Justice League Dark, The Death of Superman, Reign of the Supermen, and Justice League Dark: Apokolips War.
- Katar Hol / Hawkman makes a non-speaking appearance in Teen Titans Go! To the Movies.
- Katar Hol / Hawkman makes a non-speaking appearance in Injustice.
- Katar Hol / Hawkman makes a non-speaking appearance in Scooby-Doo! and Krypto, Too! as a member of the Justice League.
- Katar Hol / Hawkman appears in Justice League: Crisis on Infinite Earths, voiced by Geoffrey Arend.

=== Video games ===
- The Katar Hol incarnation of Hawkman appears as a playable character in Lego Batman 2: DC Super Heroes, voiced by Troy Baker.
- The Katar Hol incarnation of Hawkman appears as a playable character in Lego Batman 3: Beyond Gotham, voiced by Travis Willingham.
- An unidentified Hawkman appears as a playable character in Lego DC Super-Villains, voiced again by Travis Willingham.

=== Miscellaneous ===
Katar Hol / Hawkman appears in All-New Batman: The Brave and the Bold #9.

== Bibliography ==
- The Silver and Bronze Ages (1961–1988)
  - The Brave and the Bold #34–36, 42–44, 51, 70
  - The Atom #7, 31
  - Mystery in Space #87–90
  - Hawkman Vol. 1 #1–27
  - The Atom and Hawkman #39–45
  - Detective Comics (back-up) #428, 434, 438–439, 442, 446, 452, 454–455, 467–468, 479–480, and 500
  - Showcase #101–103
  - World’s Finest Comics #256–259, 261–262, 264–270, 272–277, 279–282
  - The Shadow War of Hawkman #1–4
  - Hawkman Vol. 2 #1–17, Special #1
- Reboot (1988–1996)
  - Hawkworld Vol. 1 #1–3
  - Hawkworld Vol. 2 #1–32, Annuals #1–3
  - Hawkman Vol. 3 #1–12, Annuals #1
