= Justice Society of America =

DC Comics superhero team

- Cover of Justice Society of America (vol. 3) #1 (February 2007). Art by Alex Ross.

Publication information
- Publisher: DC Comics
- First appearance: All Star Comics #3 (Winter 1940–1941)
- Created by: Gardner Fox; Sheldon Mayer

Roster

The Justice Society of America (JSA) are a superhero team appearing in American comic books published by DC Comics. It was created by writer Gardner Fox and editor Sheldon Mayer during the Golden Age of Comic Books. It first appeared in All Star Comics #3 (Winter 1940–1941), making it the first team of superheroes in comic books. Its original members were Doctor Fate, Hourman, the Spectre, Sandman, Atom, the Flash, Green Lantern and Hawkman.

The team was initially popular, but after superhero comics waned in the late 1940s, the JSA's adventures ceased with issue #57 of the title (March 1951). During the Silver Age of Comic Books, DC Comics reinvented several Justice Society members and brought many of them together in a new team, the Justice League of America. Other JSA members remained absent from comics for ten years until Jay Garrick appeared alongside Barry Allen, his Silver Age counterpart, in The Flash #123 (September 1961). The Justice Society was established as existing on "Earth-Two" and the Justice League on "Earth-One", different versions of Earth in different universes. This allowed for annual cross-dimensional team-ups of the teams between 1963 and 1985. New series, such as All-Star Squadron, Infinity, Inc., and a new All-Star Comics, featured the JSA, their children, and their heirs and explored the issues of aging, generational differences, and contrasts between the Golden Age and subsequent eras.

The 1985 Crisis on Infinite Earths limited series merged all of the company's various alternate realities into one, placing the JSA as World War II era predecessors to the company's modern characters. A JSA series was published from 1999 to 2006, and a Justice Society of America series that ran from 2007 to 2011. As part of DC Comics' 2011 relaunch of its entire line of monthly books, an unnamed version of the team appears in the Earth 2 Vol 1 (2012–2015), Earth 2 World's End (2014–2015), and Earth 2: Society (2015–2017).

== Publication history ==
=== All Star Comics ===
The Justice Society of America. This giclée homages artist Irwin Hasen's cover art for All-Star Comics #36 (August 1946). Art by Alex Ross

The Justice Society of America first appeared in All Star Comics #3 (Winter 1940–1941) written by Gardner Fox and edited by Sheldon Mayer during the Golden Age of Comic Books. The team initially included: Doctor Fate, Hour-Man (as his name was then spelled), the Spectre, the Sandman, the Atom, Flash, Green Lantern, and Hawkman. Because some of these characters (the Atom, the Flash, Green Lantern, and Hawkman) were published by All-American Publications rather than DC Comics, All-Star Comics #3 is the first inter-company superhero title, as well as the first team-up title. Comics' historian Les Daniels noted that: "This was obviously a great notion, since it offered readers a lot of headliners for a dime, and also the fun of watching fan favorites interact"..

The JSA's adventures were written by Gardner Fox as well as by John Broome and Robert Kanigher. The series was illustrated by a legion of artists including: Martin Nodell, Joe Kubert, Jack Kirby, Harry Lampert, Joe Simon, Alex Toth, Sheldon Moldoff, Carmine Infantino, Joe Giella, Win Mortimer, Bernard Baily, Frank Giacoia, H. G. Peter, Jack Burnley, Lee Elias, Irwin Hasen, Bob Oksner, Paul Reinman, Everett Edward Hibbard, and Bernard Sachs.

The first JSA story featured the team's first meeting, with a framing sequence for each member telling a story of an individual exploit. In the next issue, the team worked together on a common case, but each story from there on still featured the members individually on a mission involving part of the case, and then banding together in the end to wrap things up. An in-house rule explicitly laid out on the last page of All Star Comics #5, reprinted on page 206 of All Star Comics Archives Vol. 1, required that whenever a member received his or her own title, that character would leave All Star Comics, becoming an "honorary member" of the JSA. Thus, the Flash was replaced by Johnny Thunder after #6, and Green Lantern left shortly thereafter for the same reason. For this reason, Superman and Batman were established as already being "honorary" members prior to All Star Comics #3. How these two heroes helped found the JSA before becoming honorary members was not explained until DC Special #29 in 1977. Hawkman is the only member to appear in every JSA adventure in the original run of All Star Comics.

All Star Comics #8 (December 1941-January 1942) featured the first appearance of Wonder Woman. Unlike the other characters who had their own titles, she was allowed to appear in the series, but only as the JSA's secretary from #11 onward, and did not actively take part in most adventures until much later in the series. She was excluded from the title because of the same rules that had excluded the Flash, Green Lantern, Superman, and Batman from the title, though in #13 it was claimed she had become an active member.

Cover to All Star Comics #3 (Winter 1940–1941), the first appearance of the JSA. Art by E. E. Hibbard.

A fan club for the team called the "Junior Justice Society of America" was introduced in All Star Comics #13 (Oct-Nov 1942). The membership kit included a welcome letter, a badge, a decoder, a four-page comic book, and a membership certificate.

By All Star Comics #24 (Spring 1945), a real-world schism between National Comics and All-American Publications—a nominally independent company run by Max Gaines and Jack Liebowitz—had occurred, which resulted in the Detective Comics, Inc. (National Comics) heroes being removed from the title. As a result, the Flash and Green Lantern returned to the team. With issue #27 (Winter 1945), National Comics bought out Max Gaines' share of All-American and the two companies merged to form Detective Comics, Inc. The JSA roster remained mostly the same for the rest of the series. Gardner Fox left the series with issue #34 (April–May 1947) with a story that introduced a new super-villain, the Wizard. The Injustice Society first battled the JSA in issue #37 in a tale written by Robert Kanigher. The team's second female member Black Canary first helped the group in All Star Comics #38 and became a full member in #41.

All Star Comics and the JSA's Golden Age adventures ended with issue #57, the title becoming All-Star Western, with no superheroes. A good amount of artwork has survived from an unpublished All Star Comics story titled "The Will of William Wilson" and has been reprinted in various publications from TwoMorrows Publishing.

The explanation for the team's disappearance, and the inactivity of most of its roster after the early 1950s, was first given in Adventure Comics #466 ("The Defeat of the Justice Society!", December 1979) by writer Paul Levitz, which explained that most of the Society chose to disband and retire rather than appear in front of the Joint Un-American Activities Committee, which demanded that they unmask themselves.

The chairmanship of the Justice Society mostly resided with Hawkman, although initially the Flash, and later Green Lantern, took turns leading the team. For a brief period in 1942, they were known as the Justice Battalion, as they became an extension of the armed forces of the United States of America during World War II. It was later explained that the reason the JSA did not invade Europe and end the war was because of the influence of the Spear of Destiny, which caused the JSA's most powerful members to fall under the control of its wielder, Adolf Hitler. In the 1980s, it was established that the JSA had a loose affiliation with the All-Star Squadron. The All-Star Squadron's adventures were set in the 1940s, and were considered to have happened concurrently with the Justice Society's in a retcon.

The headquarters for the JSA was a hotel suite in New York City initially and, after the war, the team settled on a brownstone building in Gotham City, and later in Civic City. The JSA was provided with an orbital satellite headquarters, much like their later counterparts, the JLA, but it was immediately abandoned when it was revealed to be a death trap built in an attempt to kill off the team. The Gotham City brownstone remained unoccupied until years later when the team was active again. The headquarters used in the 2000s was a brownstone in Morningside Heights.

=== The Silver Age ===
Having successfully introduced new versions of several characters (the Flash, Green Lantern, etc.) during the late 1950s, DC tapped industry veteran, and former Justice Society writer, Gardner Fox to create a new version of the Justice Society. Editor Julius Schwartz, influenced by the popularity of Major League Baseball's National League and American League, decided to change the name of the team from Justice Society to Justice League.

In The Flash #123 (September 1961) "The Flash of Two Worlds", the Silver Age Flash meets his Golden Age counterpart, Jay Garrick who, along with the rest of the original Justice Society, is said to inhabit an alternative universe. This historic meeting thus became one of the classic DC comics of the Silver Age. Fan letters on the pages of following issues were wildly enthusiastic about the revival of the original Flash, both from older fans who remembered the old JSA tales, and younger fans eager to learn more about these new heroes. Further meetings occurred in The Flash #129 "Double Danger on Earth" (June 1962), and The Flash #137 "Vengeance of the Immortal Villain" (June 1963). The Flash #129 contains the first mention of the JSA in the Silver Age, and refers directly to their last adventure in All-Star Comics #57, while in The Flash #137 the JSA re-form.

The JSA meets the JLA. Cover of Justice League of America #21 (August 1963). Art by Mike Sekowsky and Murphy Anderson.

These stories set the stage for "Crisis on Earth-One" (Justice League of America #21, August 1963) and "Crisis on Earth-Two" (Justice League of America #22, September 1963), a two-part tale where the Golden Age Justice Society teams up with the Silver Age Justice League to combat a team of villains from both worlds. The following year, the two teams of heroes worked together to stop an evil version of the Justice League from another alternative Earth (Justice League of America #29, "Crisis on Earth-Three", August 1964). These stories became the first in a long series of team-ups of the two supergroups, an annual summer tradition which continued until 1985.

As well as the annual Justice League of America appearances, members of the JSA guest-starred in other titles over the next several years: the Golden Age Atom in The Atom #29 and #36, and the Golden Age Green Lantern in several issues of Green Lantern. In addition, a number of the characters appeared in team-up stories in issues of the DC titles The Brave and the Bold and Showcase, while the Spectre was given a solo run in the latter which led to his own series.

Some JSA members during this period, residing on "Earth-Two", were portrayed as middle-aged versions of their younger, contemporary "Earth-One" counterparts; the "Earth-Two" characters' portrayal as older than their counterparts eased incorporation of the existing fictional history of the Justice Society of America into newly written stories about the "Earth-Two" characters. Later, this fictional age gap was to become a major theme for character development, with the fictional histories of different versions of the same characters deviating significantly from each other in ways impacted by their differences in age, including even the deaths of popular characters such as Batman in one setting while different, contemporary versions of the characters lived on as inhabitants of a different fictional "Earth".

=== The Bronze Age ===
A JSA civil war. Cover of All Star Comics #69 (Nov.–Dec. 1977). Art by Al Milgrom and Jack Abel.

The JSA's popularity grew until they regained their own title. All Star Comics #58 (January/February 1976) saw the group return as mentors to a younger set of heroes briefly called the "Super Squad" until they were integrated into the JSA proper. This run lasted until #74, with a brief run thereafter in Adventure Comics #461–466, but it had three significant developments: it introduced Power Girl in All Star Comics #58, chronicled the death of the Golden Age Batman in Adventure Comics #461–462, and, after nearly 40 years, it finally provided the JSA with an origin story in DC Special #29. The Huntress was introduced in DC Super Stars #17 (Nov.–Dec. 1977) which told her origin, and All Star Comics #69 (Nov.–Dec. 1977), which was published the same day. The 1970s run of All Star Comics was written by Gerry Conway and Paul Levitz, and artists included Ric Estrada, Wally Wood, Keith Giffen, Joe Staton, and Bob Layton.

The series was noteworthy for depicting the heroes as having aged into their 50s. The artwork gave them graying hair and lined faces. It was highly unusual for a comic book to have heroes this old. Most comic books obscured the timelines or periodically relaunched the series to keep the characters youthful. This depiction was a consequence of the fact that the heroes were closely linked to the era of World War II. This became problematic in the 1980s when the heroes would logically be well into their 60s. The explanation given for this by writer Roy Thomas in All-Star Squadron Annual #3 is that the team, and several friends, have absorbed energy from the magical villain Ian Karkull during an adventure in the 1940s that slows their aging process.

Meanwhile, the JSA continued their annual team-ups with the Justice League. Notable events include meeting the Fawcett Comics heroes, including Captain Marvel, the death of Mr. Terrific, and the origin of the Black Canary.

The JLA/JSA crossovers often involved a third team as well such as the Legion of Super-Heroes, the New Gods, the Secret Society of Super Villains, and the All-Star Squadron.

All-Star Squadron was a series taking place in the JSA's original setting of the wartime 1940s. This led to a spinoff, modern day series entitled Infinity, Inc. which starred the children and heirs of the JSA members. Both series were written by noted JSA fan Roy Thomas and featured art by Rich Buckler, Jerry Ordway, Todd McFarlane, and others.

In 1985, DC retconned many details of the DC Universe in Crisis on Infinite Earths. Among the changes, the Golden Age Superman, Batman, Robin, and Wonder Woman ceased to exist, and the Earth-One/Earth-Two dichotomy was resolved by merging the Multiverse into a single universe. This posed a variety of problems for the JSA, whose history—especially in the 1980s comics—was strongly tied up in these four characters.

The JLA–JSA team-ups ended with the last pre-Crisis teamup occurring in Justice League of America #244 and Infinity Inc. #19 during the Crisis.

=== After Crisis on Infinite Earths ===
One of Roy Thomas's efforts to resolve the Crisis-created inconsistencies was to introduce some analogues to Superman, Batman, and Wonder Woman, in a sequel to All-Star Squadron titled Young All-Stars.

In 1986, DC decided to write off the JSA from active continuity. The Last Days of the Justice Society one-shot involved most of the team battling the forces of evil while merged with the Norse gods in an ever-repeating Ragnarök-like Limbo, written by Thomas, with art by David Ross and Mike Gustovich. Only Power Girl, the Star-Spangled Kid, the Spectre, and Doctor Fate escaped the cataclysm. A later comic book series, The Sandman, portrays this scenario as a simulation, created by Odin in his search for a way to thwart the real Ragnarök. Roy Thomas revised the JSA's origin for post-Crisis continuity in Secret Origins vol. 2 #31.

==== Justice Society of America (vols. 1 and 2) (1991–1993) ====
Justice Society of America (vols. 1 and 2)

Publication information
- Publisher: DC Comics
- Schedule: Monthly
- Format: Vol. 1 limited series Vol. 2 – ongoing series
- Publication date: (Vol. 1); April 1991 – November 1991 (Vol. 2); August 1992 – May 1993
- No. of issues: Vol. 1 8 Vol. 2 10

Creative team
- Written by: Len Strazewski
- Penciller: List: (Vol. 1) Tom Artis, Rick Burchett, Grant Miehm, Mike Parobeck (Vol. 2) Mike Parobeck
- Inker: List: (Vol. 1) Rick Burchett, Frank McLaughlin, Grant Miehm (Vol. 2) Jeff Albrecht, Matt Banning, Carlos Garzon, Mike Machlan

Fan interest resulted in the revival of the JSA in 1991. An eight-issue Justice Society of America limited series featuring a previously untold story set in the 1950s was published in 1991. In the final issues of the four-issue Armageddon: Inferno limited series, the JSA returns to the modern-day DC Universe when Waverider transported the "daemen" of the interdimensional Abraxis to Asgard as a substitute for the JSA in the Ragnarök cycle, allowing the team to return to Earth.

In 1992, the JSA was given an ongoing monthly series titled Justice Society of America, written by Len Strazewski with art by Mike Parobeck, featuring the original team adjusting to life after returning from Ragnarök. Though Justice Society of America was intended as an ongoing series, and was popular with readers, the decision was made to cancel the book after the third issue's release. Twelve issues of the new series were ultimately commissioned, though publication itself ended with issue #10. Portions of the remaining two issues originally intended for #11–12, which were part of a planned crossover with Justice League Europe, were published in Justice League Europe #49–50.

Strazewski, in an interview explaining the cancellation of this series, said, "It was a capricious decision made personally by Mike Carlin because he didn't like Mike's artwork or my writing and believed that senior citizen super-heroes was not what DC should be publishing. He made his opinion clear to me several times after the cancellation."

Justice Society of America included the first appearance of Jesse Quick, the daughter of All-Star Squadron members Liberty Belle and Johnny Quick, who would go on to be a major figure in Flash, Titans, and later Justice Society comics.

Not long after, most of the team was incapacitated or killed in the 1994 crossover series Zero Hour: Crisis in Time. During the battle between the Justice Society and the villain Extant, the latter removes the chronal energies keeping the Justice Society young. The Atom, Doctor Mid-Nite, and Hourman die immediately. Hawkman and Hawkgirl, who were separated from the rest of the Justice Society after being pulled into the timestream, merge into a new Hawkgod being, resulting in their deaths. Doctor Fate dies of the resulting aging shortly after Zero Hour. Green Lantern is kept young because of the mystical effects of the Starheart, but loses his ring and subsequently changes his name to Sentinel.

The rest of the team is now too physically old to continue fighting crime and retires. Starman retires and passes on the Starman legacies to his sons, resulting in the creation of one of the new series following Zero Hour, James Robinson's Starman.

==== JSA (1999–2006) ====
JSA

Publication information
- Publisher: DC Comics
- Publication date: August 1999 – September 2006
- No. of issues: 87

Creative team
- Written by: James Robinson, David S. Goyer, Geoff Johns, Paul Levitz
- Artist: Various

The JSA remained inactive for some time after the events of "Zero Hour", but the surviving members of the Flash, Wildcat, and Alan Scott (now going by the name Sentinel) have remained active throughout the DC Universe, having been placed as reserve JLI members, as evidenced in Justice League Europe #50.

The Justice Society was revived as a monthly series called JSA in 1999 which mixed the few remaining original members with younger counterparts. This incarnation of the team focused on the theme of generational legacy and of carrying on the heroic example established by their predecessors. The series was launched by James Robinson and David S. Goyer. Goyer later co-wrote the series with Geoff Johns, who continued to write the series solo after Goyer's departure. The series featured the art of Stephen Sadowski, Leonard Kirk, and Don Kramer, among others. It featured a story by Pulitzer Prize winner Michael Chabon.

During the events of Infinite Crisis, some of the surviving Golden Age characters, such as Wildcat and the Flash, are transported to the new "Earth-Two," as created by Alexander Luthor Jr., and seem to recall the existence of the original one, albeit vaguely.

==== JSA: Classified (2005–2008) ====
JSA: Classified

Publication information
- Publisher: DC Comics
- Schedule: Monthly
- Publication date: September 2005 – August 2008
- No. of issues: 39

Creative team
- Created by: Harvey Richards; Stephen Wacker
- Written by: Geoff Johns
- Artist: Amanda Conner
- Penciller: Jimmy Palmiotti

In September 2005, JSA's popularity led to a spinoff series, JSA: Classified, which tells stories of the team at various points in its existence, as well as spotlighting specific members in solo stories. The first arc, written by Geoff Johns with art by Amanda Conner, featured Power Girl's origin. The series was cancelled with issue #39 (August 2008).

=== One Year Later ===
After the events of DC's Infinite Crisis crossover and the World War III event chronicled in 52, JSA members Jay Garrick, Alan Scott, and Ted Grant decide to revive the Justice Society.

==== Justice Society of America vol. 3 (2006–2011) ====
Justice Society of America vol. 3

Publication information
- Publisher: DC Comics
- Schedule: Monthly
- Format: Ongoing series
- Publication date: February 2007 – October 2011
- No. of issues: 54

Creative team
- Written by: List: Geoff Johns, Alex Ross, Jerry Ordway, Lilah Sturges, Bill Willingham, James Robinson, Marc Guggenheim
- Artist: Alex Ross
- Penciller: List: Dale Eaglesham, Fernando Pasarin, Jerry Ordway, Jesus Merino, Mark Bagley, Scott Kolins, Tom Derenick
- Inker: List: Art Thibert, Ruy Jose, Fernando Pasarin, Rodney Ramos, Bob Wiacek, Nathan Massengill
- Colorist(s): Jeromy Cox, Hi-Fi

On December 6, 2006, a new series was launched with the creative team of Geoff Johns (writer), Dale Eaglesham (pencils), and Alex Ross (cover art). The beginning of the new series showed JSA veterans the Flash, Green Lantern, and Wildcat choosing members of the new generation of superheroes to train. Continuing a major theme from the previous JSA title, this new series focused on the team being the caretakers of the superhero legacy from one generation to the next.

The crossovers between the JLA and JSA began again with "The Lightning Saga" (see below) in JLA vol. 4 #8–10 and JSA #5–6 and an epilogue in issue #7.

Justice Society of America Annual #1 (September 2008) featured the Justice Society Infinity, a team continuing from an analogous post-Crisis Earth-Two. Most of the members of the Justice Society Infinity are original members of Earth-Two's Justice Society, such as the Atom and Robin (Dick Grayson), but the Society includes characters that are normally associated with Infinity, Inc., such as Jade and Nuklon (Albert Rothstein).

Johns' run as writer of Justice Society of America ended with issue #26. Following a two-issue story by Jerry Ordway, Bill Willingham and Lilah Sturges took over as writers with issue #29 in July 2009.

Another JLA/JSA crossover was chronicled in Justice League of America #44–48 and Justice Society of America #41–42 under the Brightest Day banner. James Robinson, the writer who co-wrote the 1999 JSA relaunch, took over as the book's writer for the crossover while Mark Bagley illustrated the entire event. After the crossover, Robinson wrote one final issue with artist Jesus Merino, which dealt with the relationship between Green Lantern and his son Obsidian.

Following the Brightest Day story arc, Marc Guggenheim became the new writer with issue #44, and Scott Kolins took over art duties from Merino. During his first several issues, Guggenheim introduced a number of new characters to the team, such as Blue Devil and Manhunter. In issue #49, he expanded the JSA's roster by bringing back all of the JSA All-Stars except for Magog, who had been killed in Justice League: Generation Lost, and Power Girl, who had unofficially departed from the JSA during the same maxi-series, as well as the original Liberty Belle. In addition, Guggenheim introduced a new character named Red Beetle (a gadget-wielding heroine clad in a red variation of the Silver Age Blue Beetle's costume), and brought in Ri and Darknight, two Chinese superheroes that he had created for his Batman Confidential run.

==== JSA All-Stars vol. 2 (2009–2011) ====
JSA All-Stars (vol. 2)

Publication information
- Publisher: DC Comics
- Schedule: Monthly
- Publication date: February 2010 – July 2011
- No. of issues: 18

Creative team
- Created by: Lilah Sturges; Freddie Williams II
- Written by: Lilah Sturges
- Artist: Freddie Williams II

An ongoing series titled JSA All-Stars debuted with a February 2010 cover date (distinct from JSA: All Stars, a limited series published from July 2003 to February 2004). The series focused on a second team that formed after the JSA split. Calling themselves the "All-Stars", the group included more of the newer, younger members of the JSA. The roster consisted of: Magog, Damage, Power Girl, Hourman, Atom Smasher, Sand, Stargirl, Cyclone, Wildcat (Ton Bronson), Citizen Steel, Judomaster, King Chimera, Anna Fortune, and the A.I. Roxy, with Damage and Magog later being killed.

DC cancelled JSA All-Stars with issue #18 (July 2011) because of the events of Flashpoint, the DC 2011 summer event. As a result of the title's cancellation, writer Marc Guggenheim had all of the All-Stars except Power Girl and Magog rejoin the JSA in Justice Society of America #49.

=== DC Rebirth (2016–2017) ===
In the DC Universe Rebirth one-shot, Johnny Thunder is in a nursing home. He is trying to escape, but Kid Flash Wally West appears to Johnny trying to establish a link to return from the Speed Force. Johnny admits he threw away the magic pen containing Thunderbolt. In The Flash Rebirth series, the interaction between Pre-New 52 Wally West and New 52 Wally West triggers a disturbance in the Speed Force, which causes Barry to have a strange vision. In the vision, Barry sees Johnny Quick's Speed formula and Jay Garrick's Flash helmet. Johnny Thunder is seen again during the Button crossover, where he is on a roof shouting for his Thunderbolt and that it is his fault they lost the Justice Society. At the end of the crossover, it is revealed that the Pre-New 52 Jay Garrick was also stuck in the Speed Force, and Barry is able to momentarily free him. However, when Barry tries to secure him to the universe just as he did to Wally, Jay instead is transported back into the Speed Force in a blast of blue energy.

In Doomsday Clock, Doctor Manhattan recalls various events in which he indirectly killed Alan Scott and thus brought about changes in the timeline. On July 16, 1940, Alan Scott was riding on a train over a collapsing bridge, but he survived by grabbing onto a green lantern. He continues his life, eventually "sitting at a round table wearing a mask" and later testifying before the House Un-American Activities Committee but refusing to implicate anyone in his employ. On July 16, 1940, again, Manhattan moves the lantern six inches out of Scott's reach so that Scott dies in the train accident and leaves no family behind. At the Daily Planet, Lois Lane finds a flash-drive showing footage of the Justice Society, who she does not know of. When Manhattan first arrived in the DC Universe, he witnesses the creation of the JSA and each of its founding members superhero personas. In one timeline (Golden Age/Earth-2), Manhattan watches as the JSA wait for the arrival of Superman to formally create their team. This then changes to a timeline (Post-Crisis/New Earth) where Superman was not a founding member and did not arrive until 1956. Curious about the importance of Superman and what would happen if time were to be changed and how it would affect him, Manhattan prevented Alan Scott from becoming Green Lantern. This in turn created the New 52 Universe, and with it, the creation of the Justice Society of America was erased. When Manhattan undoes the experiment that erased the Justice Society and the Legion of Super-Heroes, the Justice Society appears to help Superman fight the rampaging metahumans. Afterwards, the Justice Society investigates the Department of Metahuman Affairs which led to the arrest of those involved.

The Justice Society returns in the pages of Justice League. The League splits up to retrieve fragments on the Totality from the past and future. Flash and Green Lantern are transported to 1941 to retrieve a fragment. They arrive in December 1941 to discover that the Legion of Doom has already travelled to the past and meddled in history, attacking and seemingly conquering the United States. They encounter the Justice Society, much to their surprise, as they are not aware of any superheroes active in the 1940s. However, they begin to develop an affinity for their Golden Age counterparts, and feel that there is an intricate shared history they cannot fully remember.

In the fifth volume of Hawkman following the defeat of Anton Hastor, a deceased Hawkman and Hawkwoman are reborn as their Golden Age counterparts, reuniting with their old friends in the Justice Society.

=== New Justice (2018–2021) ===
In the pages of "Dark Nights: Death Metal", Justice Society members Green Lantern, Flash, Doctor Fate, and Wildcat were shown to be guarding the Valhalla Cemetery. The password to get in was "Ma Hunkel" where Green Lantern mentioned that she was the first guardian of the JSA's first headquarters. As Superman and his allies prepare for their final fight against both Perpetua and the Darkest Knight, Justice Society members Damage, Green Lantern, and Flash were present. In addition, Batman used the Black Lantern ring to revive JSA members Atom, Hourman, Ma Hunkel, and Sandman. At the end of "Dark Nights: Death Metal", the Justice Society are shown fighting in World War II alongside the narrator of the series Sgt. Rock. It is explicitly noted that this is 1943 in the DC universe, indicating that they have been fully restored to the timeline.

=== Dawn of DC (2023–2024) ===
In August 2022 it was announced that following the conclusion of Flashpoint Beyond, a one shot entitled The New Golden Age would release in November that year, with heavy ties to the fourth volume of the Justice Society of America series, with Geoff Johns writing and Mikel Janín providing art. The central storyline also ties in to several limited series like Stargirl: The Lost Children, Alan Scott: The Green Lantern, Jay Garrick: The Flash, and Wesley Dodds: The Sandman.

The first five issues had the Justice Society encountering a Huntress from a possible future and fighting Per Degaton and his time clones. Per Degaton is defeated and Huntress' possible future is erased with Huntress remaining in the present.

=== DC All In (2024–present) ===
JSA (vol. 2)

Publication information
- Publisher: DC Comics
- Publication date: November 2024 – October 2026
- No. of issues: 24

Creative team
- Written by: Jeff Lemire
- Artist: Diego Olortegui
- Colorist: Luis Guerrero

== Awards ==
The Justice Society received a 1965 Alley Award in the category "Strip or Book Most Desired for Revival".

== Other versions ==
=== JSA: The Golden Age ===
An alternate universe iteration of the Justice Society appear in JSA: The Golden Age.

=== Earth 2 ===
The Justice Society appears in Earth-2, consisting of Jay Garrick / Flash, Alan Scott / Green Lantern, Kendra Saunders / Hawkgirl, and Al Pratt / The Atom.

=== Earth-3 ===
The Justice Society All-Stars, a group from Earth-3 who serve as heroic counterparts of the Injustice Society, appears in Hawkman (vol. 5) #18, consisting of Lion-Miss (an amalgam of Cheetah and Lion-Mane), the Pinkerton Ghost, Matter Mage, and Shadow Sheriff.

== In other media ==
=== Television ===
==== Animation ====
- The Justice League two-part episode "Legends" pays homage to the Justice Society with the Justice Guild of America (JGA), a team of imaginary superheroes who exist in another universe and consists of Scott Mason / Green Guardsman, Donna Nance / Black Siren, T. Blake / Cat Man, the Streak and Tom Turbine, who are all based on JSA members Alan Scott / Green Lantern, Dinah Drake / Black Canary, Ted Grant / Wildcat, Jay Garrick / Flash and Al Pratt / Atom respectively. They fought crime until they were all killed in a nuclear war. Over the course of the following 40 years, a boy mutated by the radiation named Ray Thompson used his psionic powers to recreate the JGA as an illusion until the Justice League arrive in his universe and eventually inspire the JGA to sacrifice themselves to restore reality. According to the writers, the creative team originally intended to use the JSA for the episode, but DC Comics declined as their portrayal clashed with their comic counterparts' post-Crisis on Infinite Earths portrayal.
- The Justice Society appear in Batman: The Brave and the Bold, consisting of Jay Garrick / Flash, Ted Grant / Wildcat, Rex Tyler / Hourman, Charles McNider / Doctor Mid-Nite, Carter Hall / Hawkman, Dinah Drake / Black Canary, Kent Nelson / Doctor Fate, the Spectre, Terry Sloane / Mister Terrific, Alan Scott / Green Lantern, Wesley Dodds / Sandman, and Ted Knight / Starman. This version of the group tutored Batman in his early days. Additionally, Drake was killed in action and asked Grant to look after her daughter Dinah Laurel Lance.
- The Justice Society of America (JSA) appear in Young Justice. According to the series' producers, most of the original JSA members are either dead or retired by the time the series takes place. Most of the team itself appears in a flashback sequence in the episode "Humanity", consisting of Alan Scott / Green Lantern, Jay Garrick / Flash, Wesley Dodds / Sandman, Ted Grant / Wildcat, Kent Nelson / Doctor Fate, and Red Tornado. Additionally, Firebrand was also a member for a short time before she was revealed to be an android created by T. O. Morrow while Dan Garrett / Blue Beetle appears as a member in the episode "Failsafe".

==== Live-action ====
- The Justice Society of America appear in the Smallville two-part episode "Absolute Justice", primarily consisting of Carter Hall / Hawkman, Kent Nelson / Doctor Fate, and Courtney Whitmore / Stargirl. Additionally, Sylvester Pemberton / Star-Spangled Kid, Wesley Dodds / Sandman, Ted Grant / Wildcat, Jay Garrick / Flash, Al Pratt / Atom, Alan Scott / Green Lantern, and Red Tornado appear briefly or in flashbacks while Shiera Hall / Hawkgirl, Rex Tyler / Hourman, Charles McNider / Doctor Mid-Nite, Terry Sloane / Mister Terrific, the Spectre, and Dinah Drake / Black Canary appear in a painted group portrait. Like their post-Crisis incarnation, this version of the group is an earlier generation of superheroes who were forced to retire when the government tried to take control of them after determining their real identities before resurfacing in the present to mentor new superheroes.
- The Justice Society of America appear in Legends of Tomorrow, led by Rex Tyler / Hourman and consisting of Henry Heywood / Commander Steel, Todd Rice / Obsidian, Courtney Whitmore / Stargirl, Amaya Jiwe / Vixen, and Charles McNider / Doctor Mid-Nite. This version of the group operated during World War II. In 1942, the JSA work with the time-traveling Legends to stop a group of Nazis after they obtain a super-power granting serum from Eobard Thawne. After his plan is foiled, Thawne kills Tyler, leading to Vixen joining the Legends to avenge his death. In 1956, the JSA became inactive when everyone but Obsidian were believed to have been killed during a covert mission. In reality, they recovered the Spear of Destiny with the help of Rip Hunter, who then transported Stargirl, Steel, and Mid-Nite to differing points in time to guard fragments of the Spear and prevent its reassembly. However, the Legion of Doom brainwashes Hunter into joining them and recovering the fragments, killing Mid-Nite and Steel in the process.
- Two incarnations of the Justice Society of America appear in Stargirl.
  - The original group was led by Sylvester Pemberton / Starman and consisted of Kent Nelson / Doctor Fate, Charles McNider / Doctor Mid-Nite, Jay Garrick / Flash, Alan Scott / Green Lantern, Carter Hall / Hawkman, Shiera Hall / Hawkgirl, Rex Tyler / Hourman, Johnny Thunder and Thunderbolt, Wesley Dodds / Sandman, and Ted Grant / Wildcat. A decade prior, the JSA was attacked by the Injustice Society of America (ISA) while deciding how to address Eclipso's Black Diamond. When Pat Dugan arrived, most of the team had been killed and he only had time to evacuate a fatally wounded Starman. Before he died, the latter told the former to find someone worthy of wielding the Cosmic Staff to keep the JSA's legacy alive.
  - By the present day, Courtney Whitmore finds the Cosmic Staff, becomes Stargirl, and rebuilds the JSA with Pat as S.T.R.I.P.E. and her friends Yolanda Montez, Beth Chapel and Rick Tyler as the new Wildcat, Doctor Mid-Nite, and Hourman respectively. At the end of the second season, Whitmore recruits Cindy Burman into the JSA. Ten years later, as depicted in the series finale, the JSA's ranks have grown to include Jennie-Lynn Hayden / Jade, Todd Rice / Obsidian, Mike Dugan / S.T.R.I.P.E. 2.0, Jakeem Thunder and Thunderbolt, Cameron Mahkent / Icicle, Artemis Crock, Sandy Hawkins / Sand, Damage, Solomon Grundy, and Richard Swift / Shade. Additionally, Whitmore and Burman went on to become Starwoman and Dragon Queen respectively.
    - Ahead of the series premiere, the founding members of Stargirl's JSA made a cameo appearance in "Crisis on Infinite Earths" via archive footage.

=== Film ===
- The Justice Society of America appears in the opening credits of Justice League: The New Frontier, consisting of Rex Tyler / Hourman, Ted Grant / Wildcat, Alan Scott / Green Lantern, Jay Garrick / Flash, Dinah Drake / Black Canary, Carter Hall / Hawkman, and Charles McNider / Doctor Mid-Nite. After Tyler is killed, the JSA retire, though Grant remained active as a professional boxer.
- The Earth-2 incarnation of the Justice Society of America appears in Justice Society: World War II, led by Wonder Woman and consisting of Rex Tyler / Hourman, Dinah Drake / Black Canary, Carter Hall / Hawkman, and Jay Garrick / Flash. This version of the group was active during their Earth's version of the titular war.
- The Justice Society appears in Black Adam, led by Carter Hall / Hawkman and consisting of Kent Nelson / Doctor Fate, Maxine Hunkel / Cyclone, and Albert Rothstein / Atom Smasher. Originally, Shayera Hol / Hawkgirl and Courtney Whitmore / Stargirl were going to appear as members as well, but were cut in favor of Cyclone. This version of the group are associates of Amanda Waller.
- In addition to Black Adam, a Justice Society film was reported to be in development by Warner Bros. as of May 2020.
- The Earth-2 incarnation of the Justice Society of America appears in Justice League: Crisis on Infinite Earths, consisting of Charles McNider / Doctor Mid-Nite, Rex Tyler / Hourman, Jennie-Lynn Hayden / Jade, Todd Rice / Obsidian, Ted Knight / Starman, Ted Grant / Wildcat, and Dinah Drake / Black Canary.
- The Justice Society of America makes a cameo appearance in Superman via a mural at the Hall of Justice, consisting of Silent Knight, Black Pirate, Jay Garrick / Flash, Atomic Knight, Wildcat, Vibe, Amethyst, Black Bison, The Sandman and The Specter.
