= Batman Beyond (comic book) =

Title of six DC Comics Series

- Cover of issue #1 (January 2011) of Batman Beyond (vol. 4) #1-8 (January–August 2011), art by Dustin Nguyen

Publication information
- Publisher: DC Comics
- Schedule: Monthly
- Format: Ongoing series
- Genre: Superhero
- Publication date: (vol. 1): 1999 (vol. 2): 1999–2001 (vol. 3): 2010–2011 (vol. 4): 2011; Unlimited: 2012–2013; Universe: 2013–2015 (vol. 5): 2015–2016 (vol. 6): 2016–2020 (Neo-Year): 2022 (Neo-Gothic): 2023
- No. of issues: (vol. 1): 6 issues (limited series) (vol. 2): 24 issues (vol. 3): 6 issues (limited series) (vol. 4): 8 issues Unlimited: 18 issues Universe: 16 issues (vol. 5): 16 issues (vol. 6): 50 issues (Neo-Year): 6 issues (Neo-Gothic): 6 issues
- Main character(s): Terry McGinnis; Bruce Wayne; Dick Grayson; Barbara Gordon; Tim Drake; Maxine "Max" Gibson; Elainna Grayson

Creative team
- Written by: (vol. 1): Hilary J. Bader (vol. 2): Hilary J. Bader (#1-14, 16-19, 21-22, 24), Jason Hernandez-Rosenblatt (#15, 20), Paul D. Storrie (#23) (vol. 3): Adam Beechen (vol. 4): Adam Beechen; Unlimited: Adam Beechen; Universe: Kyle Higgins (vol. 5): Dan Jurgens (vol. 6): Dan Jurgens (Neo-Year): Collin Kelly (Neo-Gothic): Jackson Lanzing
- Penciller(s): (vol. 1): Rick Burchett (#1-3), Joe Staton (#4-6) (vol. 2): Craig Rousseau (#1-6, #12, 15-20, #23-24), Min S. Ku (#7, 13-14), Terry Beatty (#8-11), Rick Burchett (#21-22) (vol. 3): Ryan Benjamin (vol. 4): Ryan Benjamin, Eduardo Pansica, Chris Batista; Universe: Thony Silas; Unlimited: Norm Breyfogle (BB) and Dustin Nguyen (JLB) (vol. 5): Bernard Chang (vol. 6): Bernard Chang

Batman Beyond is a comic book series featuring the fictional character Terry McGinnis as Batman and based on the animated television series of the same name. It has appeared in various DC Comics publications, including a six-issue miniseries from 1999, a 24-issue series running from 1999 to 2001, the "Hush" arc by DC Comics in 2010, and an eight-issue miniseries in 2011. A short-running series titled Batman Beyond Unlimited was later released, followed by Batman Beyond 2.0 in 2013.

== Batman Beyond and Batman Beyond (vol. 2) DCAU tie-ins (1999–2001) ==
Cover art by Bruce Timm from the Batman Beyond comic book miniseries, depicting Batman battling Blight

After an initial six-issue miniseries released in March 1999, Batman Beyond had its own comic book series, running through November 1999 until October 2001, for a total of 24 issues. They were set in the same world as the TV series and aimed at younger readers.

Originally, Batman Beyond #3 (the monthly series) was to focus on the Terrific Trio from the episode "Heroes". The story would have 2-D Man and Magma trying to revive their former teammate, Freon. It was rejected due to their resemblance to the Fantastic Four.

Terry also appeared in Superman Adventures #64. The story has Terry/Batman traveling to the present and teaming up with Superman against a futuristic version of Brainiac.

A comic book adaptation of Batman Beyond: Return of the Joker was released in 2001.

The series had issues reprinted in Batman Beyond and DC Comics Presents Batman Beyond #1.

== DC Universe ==
=== Cameos ===
In Superman/Batman #22 (written by Jeph Loeb), a Batman wearing the Beyond costume appears, making his first foray into the regular DC Comics continuity. The plot involves Bizarro being transported to an alternate version of Gotham City. In issue #23, this Batman is named "Tim". The packaging for the action figure created by DC Direct based on this appearance in Superman/Batman identifies this Batman Beyond as Tim Drake.

On March 3, 2007, Dan DiDio announced that Terry McGinnis had a chance to appear in the DCU sometime that year. Terry appeared in Countdown to Final Crisis #21, set on Earth-12.

A Green Lantern implied to be from Earth-12, a universe within the multiverse similar to that of Batman Beyond (though not the same GL represented in the animated series) was a participant in the Countdown: Arena series (2007) leading towards Final Crisis.

The character also made a cameo in Justice League of America #43, which was released May 2010.

=== Mainstream contemporary continuity ===
In Batman #700 (June 2010), Terry McGinnis is included in the one-off as a part of the DC Universe presented, having a history with Damian Wayne, who rescued him as Batman from Two-Face-Two when he was held hostage as an infant. Two-Face-Two believed Terry McGinnis was one of a pair of twin boys who were the sons of billionaires rather than Warren and Mary McGinnis. Two-Face-Two transformed Terry into a miniature duplicate of the Joker with Joker venom. Damian administers the antidote after he rescues Terry. In the following page, Terry is seen behind the Batman cowl, battling the apparently-resurrected Joker, with Damian as his mentor, instead of Bruce.

Superman/Batman Annual #4 (2010) is a single oversized issue featuring Terry McGinnis' Batman. Author Paul Levitz penned the story, with experience collaborating with Paul Dini and Alan Burnett in the past. It picks up after Superman's first meeting with the new Batman taking place in the DCAU, and supposedly jibing with the DCU's "Batman Beyond" verse.

In September 2011, The New 52 rebooted DC's continuity. In this new timeline, Terry is reintroduced in the 2014 maxiseries, The New 52: Futures End.

== Batman Beyond (vol. 3) (2010) ==
Batman Beyond is a 2010 six-issue comic book limited series published by DC Comics. The series is an attempt to mesh the DC Animated Universe television series Batman Beyond with the mainstream DC continuity. The comic series is penned by Emmy Award-nominated writer Adam Beechen with art by Ryan Benjamin. Beechen stated his comic book arc would open the door for the "legendary" DCAU to enter into the mainstream DC Universe (comics), tying into both continuities. The story features Terry McGinnis, the future Batman, now a seasoned hero, and his mentor Bruce Wayne, the former Batman, dealing with their straining relationship over the demands of the role of Batman, as a new killer emerges with ties to the original Dark Knight's past.

=== Creation and development ===
Beechen was approached by Dan DiDio in December 2008 regarding the possibility of the project. Beechen responded by pitching DC Comics editor Ian Sattler in a two-worded email, the title to opening story arc. The series was green-lit during Comic-Con 2009. The series was first announced during the Emerald City ComiCon in March 2010. Summarizing the series, Beechen stated:

"The dark future of the legendary animated series comes to the DCU in a six-issue miniseries, as Terry McGinnis, Bruce Wayne's young successor as Batman, faces his deadliest foe yet — a mystery murderer from the Dark Knight's past! Old faces return, new allies and enemies step into the light, and the partnership between Terry and Bruce — not to mention Terry and Bruce themselves — might not survive!"

The story arc opened in a single issue focusing on and featuring Terry McGinnis and Superman in Superman/Batman Annual #4. Following the issue, the miniseries began in June 2010, under the title Future Evil. In August 2010, the series was announced to continue following the completion of the first story arc as an ongoing series.

=== Plot ===
The return of Batman (Terry McGinnis), art by Dustin Nguyen.

Terry McGinnis has repeatedly refused to join the Justice League. The death of the villain Signalman prompts Bruce to send Terry out to investigate. They discover that the M.O. matches Two-Face, who had disappeared years ago during his final battle with Bruce. Reports of alarms at St. James Hospital disrupts them and Terry investigates, it has been the home of the Mad Hatter since Arkham Asylum closed down. After checking in on the Hatter, who has become docile and somewhat senile, Terry discovers a nurse under attack by a man in a trench coat. The mysterious rogue flees at the sight of Batman and Terry checks on the nurse, who says the man told her to "Hush".

During Terry's fight with "Hush," it is revealed that he is not only capable of matching Terry, but is also aware it is not Bruce Wayne. "Hush" reveals his plan while regarding Terry as an 'imposter', and states he will 'orphan' Batman all over again by killing Batman's rogues gallery. "Hush" escapes, leaving Terry to decide whether or not to pursue him or rescue Calendar Man, who is bound with a bomb attached to him. Choosing the latter, Terry arrives too late as a bomb detonates, killing Day. After he returns to the cave, Terry receives a talk from Bruce about commitment to Batman. Meanwhile, Amanda Waller talks with Doctor Reid about reports of the murders; Reid insists that they report their role in this, but Waller shoots down the option.

Bruce attempts to apprehend Hush, allowing Catwoman an opportunity to escape. The attack fails as Hush attempts to hack the Drone, forcing Bruce to activate the Wraith's self-destruct. Meanwhile, Terry talks with Dick Grayson, who now runs an athletics training center. Dick explains that he retired as Nightwing after he was shot, resulting in losing an eye while aiding Batman. He then retired in disgust at Bruce's lack of concern for Dick's health after the shooting. As Terry leaves, Dick warns Terry but Terry disregards it. At Project Cadmus, Waller learns that Doctor Reid has gone missing. Attempting to lure Hush into a trap, Terry uses a hologram to pose as a villain, only to be hit by Hush. Mocking Terry, Hush unmasks himself and reveals himself to be Dick Grayson, determined to replace Bruce Wayne once and for all.

At Gotham Central, Reid reveals that Hush is a clone of Grayson created by Cadmus and was intended to act as a successor to Batman. However, the clone escaped before he was ready, believing himself to be the real Dick Grayson and wanting to replace Batman himself. Reid also reveals that she is a granddaughter of Thomas Elliot, and is seeking to atone for her family's sins by working for Waller. Hush reveals by transmission that he will save the city by performing mercy killings of its corrupt, by a mass of explosives at the epicenter to set off an earthquake.

Terry, aided by Dick Grayson and Catwoman, confronts the clone, with Grayson unable to convince Hush that he is a clone. The group defeats Hush when Bruce temporarily overrides Hush's control of the Bat-Wraiths, resulting in the clone being accidentally impaled. Catwoman departs quickly and Grayson departs despite Bruce's attempts to offer an apology for how things ended between them. Terry returns to Bruce, with whom he discusses the ideals of heroism. Bruce offers Terry a chance to step down as Batman, Terry refuses, stating that it is better than anything else he could do. Unknown to them, Waller has escaped blame for her role in Grayson's cloning by claiming that Reid was acting alone, and is now aided by a new geneticist, Doctor Thawne. Waller has begun research into a new line of clones, stating that recent events have merely confirmed her ideals.

=== Reception ===
The first issue of the series was well received and met favorable reviews for both writing and art. Ian Robinson of Crave noted the series was both blended well with and matured from the animated series. Jesse Schedeen of IGN provided a favorable review, but commented that while the writing transitioned well from small screen to comic, the art was 'haphazard' and 'inconsistent.'

== Batman Beyond (vol. 4) (2011) ==
Batman Beyond was published as an ongoing series that lasted for eight issues. It featured two major storylines, the first of which featured the Justice League Beyond and a person who would become the Matter Master of the future. The second storyline featured the return of Blight, Terry's original nemesis. Two issues also provided an in-depth exploration of characters Max Gibson and Inque, whose origins were revealed. Several plot threads were not resolved and left for the 2012 relaunch. Also in 2011, a comic book one-shot titled Superman Beyond #0 was released, set in the "Beyond" timeline and featured a cameo of Terry McGinnis.

== Batman Beyond Unlimited and Batman Beyond Universe digital comics (2012–2015) ==
Cover of Batman Beyond Unlimited #1, art by Dustin Nguyen

The Batman Beyond universe returned as tri-weekly digital issues, which were published on a monthly basis in print as the Batman Beyond Unlimited ongoing 48-page comic book. This monthly title included Batman Beyond, Justice League Beyond and Superman Beyond.

Superman Beyond ceased publication with its 20th digital release, in June 2013. Justice League Beyond then ceased publication with its 25th digital issue, in June 2013. Batman Beyond eventually ceased publication with its 29th digital issue, in July 2013.

After the cancellation of Batman Beyond Unlimited, the Batman Beyond line was relaunched. Starting in August 2013, Batman Beyond 2.0 and Justice League Beyond 2.0 began publication, with each digital title receiving new creative teams. The print release was relaunched as Batman Beyond Universe, The new series takes place a year after Batman Beyond Unlimited. Terry is now a freshman at Gotham University and now has more experience as Batman. One of his classmates is Melanie Walker. Terry is working with Dick Grayson rather than Bruce Wayne. The Justice League also must deal with Superman when his powers go out of control and an old foe from his past also returns. After the final story arc, 'Justice Lords Beyond', the series concluded in 2014.

=== Legends of the Dark Knight: Jake ===
This side story focuses on the great-grandnephew of Joe Chill, Jake. Jake is an alcoholic who lives in the lower streets of downtown Gotham through government checks wracked with guilt. He was formerly a security guard at Wayne-Powers Industries before being upgraded to a special security that Derek Powers called his "Quiet Squad" under the command of Powers' right-hand man, Mister Fixx. He enjoyed upgrading his weaponry and the benefits he got from the job until he was ordered to kill Warren McGinnis.

After Warren's death, Jake became depressed after watching Warren's funeral on television and seeing the family that Warren left behind. He descended into alcoholism and was fired after Batman defeated Powers and Fixx and the temporary management at Wayne-Powers discovered the Quiet Squad's existence. He did not look for another job and was evicted from his apartment, which led him to the lower streets. During the night Jake is narrating this, he finds a group of thieves ransacking his house and lashes out at them, using his combat experience to gain the upper hand. After defeating the criminals, he finds a new purpose in life and takes out his old armor from his Quiet Squad days. Jake begins planning on upgrading his equipment and becoming a new hero in Gotham to atone for his sins.

=== Justice Lords Beyond: Another World ===
In a crossover with Justice League Beyond, Batman finds himself in the Justice Lords timeline where he and the rest of the League try to find out what happened to Wonder Woman. When he is first transported to the world, he is confronted by this world's version of Dick Grayson, who is a commander of the Justice Lord Task Force. They use an EMP blast to disable Batman's suit, but Terry manages to escape. He finds his counterpart in this world, who is a blond Jokerz member named T. T reveals to Terry that this world's Bruce Wayne was killed years ago for standing against the other Justice Lords. Terry takes the two of them to Wayne Manor, where he finds the house destroyed. The two are cornered by the Jokerz, but defeat them when Terry finds an upgraded Batsuit in the Batcave. They are then confronted by Justice Lord Superman, who arrests T and supposedly kills Terry.

However it is revealed on the Task Force ship that Terry's death was a projection given by the suit. Batman escapes from the ship and goes into the Batcave, where he retrieves the Batmobile and a message from the deceased Justice Lord Batman. He goes to the JLTF headquarters to rescue T and convinces the alternate Dick to join them by showing that Justice Lord Batman imbued the new Batsuit with synthetic kryptonite to use against Justice Lord Superman. T chooses to stay behind while Dick and Terry go to the Watchtower to gain access to the Portal Generator under disguise. After the disguise easily breaks, Terry and Dick are rescued by T, who changed his mind and aids them transporting Terry back to his world.

Terry's kryptonite suit allows the Justice League to defeat Justice Lord Superman. He then returns to the Lords' timeline to give back the suit and talk to T one last time. T allows Terry to talk to the alive Warren McGinnis of this world as repayment. Terry gets emotional for having a chance to talk to his father again and rewatches their conversation when he gets back to Dick's headquarters. While they watch the recap through Terry's recorder, Dick gets the chance to see his Justice Lords counterpart, who is married to Barbara Gordon and has a son named Jon. Though shocked, Dick accepts that some things are bound to be different in alternate timelines. In the Justice Lord timeline, Dick and T are inspired by Terry to continue Bruce's work as T prepares to become the Batman Beyond of his world, with Terry monitoring him.

=== Mark of the Phantasm ===
This story takes place a year before the current events and explains what led Terry to leave Bruce. After a night fending off the Jokerz, Batman and Vigilante go their separate ways. During the fight, Vigilante's blood was spilled on the scene and collected by the police, who identify him as Jake Chill. Jake is attacked by the Phantasm in his apartment, who demands his death for the murder of Warren McGinnis. Batman manages to arrive just as Phantasm escapes and leaves behind a gas. After Jake tells Terry his role in Warren's death, Batman starts ruthlessly beating up Jake and is only stopped by Bruce's intervention. When Terry returns to the Batcave, Bruce tells him that he inhaled some of Andrea's fear toxin and started acting irrationally. Terry asks Bruce if he knew about Jake, but Bruce denies it. Terry suspects he's lying given how Jake worked at Wayne Enterprises and was related to the killer of Bruce's parents, Joe Chill.

Terry goes to Dick and Barbara after his talk with Bruce. The two decide to tell Terry what led to the Bat-Family falling apart. While Tim Drake was recovering from the Joker's psychological trauma (as seen in the flashbacks of Return of the Joker), Barbara quit being Batgirl and ended her relationship with Bruce. Dick returned to Gotham after hearing what happened and felt guilty that he was not there for Tim. Dick and Barbara rekindled their relationship, with Dick even planning to propose to Barbara at one point. However, Barbara found out that she was pregnant with Bruce's child and refused to tell Dick about it. Bruce told Dick about the pregnancy himself, leading his former sidekick to lash out at him. Barbara had a miscarriage after stopping a couple of thieves in an alley. A year later, Barbara would meet Sam Young at the D.A.'s office and eventually married him as she and Dick severed their ties with Bruce.

Bruce tells Terry that Vigilante and the Jokerz are at the library, where the gang injects an upgraded Joker toxin into Jake to send him into a maniacal rampage. As this is happening, Andrea reunites with Bruce in the Batcave. She tells Bruce that she needs to kill Jake as she's afraid that Terry might do it, and she's aware Bruce is also afraid of the same thing and lied to Terry about not knowing Jake prior before she heads to the library. Batman manages to defeat the Jokerz and prevents Phantasm from stabbing Jake, but the Joker toxin and Andrea's fear gas prove too much for Jake and he dies of a seizure.

Terry feels guilty about Jake's death and goes to the Batcave after finding out Bruce told Dana and Max what happened so they could comfort him. He loses his trust in Bruce after finding out what happened to Dick and Barbara and decides to end their partnership. It is revealed that Andrea was hired by Amanda Waller to take out Jake as killing goes against what Batman represents. In the Arkham Institute, Davis Dusk meets Ghoul in the middle of his father's interview with a reporter, which eventually leads him into becoming Rewire. In the present, Rewire is released from Arkham thanks to Ghoul acting as his lawyer.

== Batman Beyond (vol. 5) mainstream DCU series (2015–2016) ==
Tim Drake as Terry McGinnis's successor in the mainstream DCU continuity, cover art of the first issue by Bernard Chang

DC Comics announced that another ongoing Batman Beyond series would be released in June 2015. It takes place in the future of its current stories' history. Following the conclusion of The New 52: Futures End, Tim Drake was the titular character instead of Terry McGinnis, who settles in the latter's time period and helps raise McGinnis's brother Matt in his absence. The first issue is written by Dan Jurgens with art by Bernard Chang. The series concluded after 16 issues before leading into the DC Rebirth event.

=== Plot ===
==== Brave New Worlds ====
Following Tim's time displacement and Terry's death in Future's End, Tim finds himself in the future as the new Batman Beyond in Neo-Gotham. He allies himself with Terry's brother, Matt McGinnis, and his guardian, Nora Boxer. Matt has a difficult time accepting Tim filling in for his brother's shoes. Tim finds out that Neo-Gotham is the safest and one of the few inhabitable places left on Earth following Brother Eye's destruction. With his artificial intelligence A.L.F.R.E.D., Tim's first mission as the new Batman is to infiltrate Brother Eye's Lodge and rescue the older Commissioner Barbara Gordon and Terry's friend Maxine Gibson. During the rescue, he gains a new ally in the form of one of Terry's archenemies, Inque, who was allied with Brother Eye because he has her daughter, Deanna Clay, hostage on the moon. Batman and Inque escape with Barbara and a tortured Max into Neo-Gotham, but Tim finds out that Brother Eye let them escape because he downloaded himself into A.L.F.R.E.D., allowing him to pinpoint Neo-Gotham's location. Neo-Gotham is attacked by Brother Eye's forces, which included robotocized versions of Superman, Wonder Woman, and John Stewart. Due to the damage Tim's suit has taken, Barbara gives Tim the suit that her father wore when he replaced Batman. Batman manages to defeat all the robots with the help of the last surviving Justice League member, Micron. Tim is then teleported to the moon for his final showdown against Brother Eye. He manages to defeat the villain with the help of Inque, who sacrifices herself to ensure Brother Eye is destroyed and that her daughter is safe.

==== City of Yesterday ====
Tim starts settling into his new role as the Batman of the future with Barbara acting as his tech support similar to how Bruce acted for Terry. Meanwhile, Matt recovered John Stewart's arm after Terry's battle with the robots and uses the Green Lantern ring to find out more about the city of Metropolis. Matt runs away to Metropolis, forcing Tim to go after him. In Neo-Gotham, Barbara and Mayor Luke Fox have to deal with an overwhelming number of citizens from Metropolis and other desolated cities who want to break into Neo-Gotham. Luke does not allow them in due to the limited supplies they have for the inhabiting citizens as it is, but they eventually bust the wall and start overwhelming the security. In the desolated Metropolis, Tim finds himself pitted against splicers under the order of Dr. Abel Cuvier and Tuftan, members of the Evil Factory and former allies of Brother Eye. Matt finds the Justice League imprisoned within the Watchtower in Metropolis, but when he frees them to help Tim, they do not cooperate as they have a device implanted on them to make it look like every person they see are robots created by Brother Eye. They are stopped when Tim and Matt rescue Superman (who in this reality is Clark's son, Jonathan Kent). The Justice League returns to Neo-Gotham to put the intruding citizens under control and begin working to improve the world.

==== Wired for Death ====
After the Justice League's return, Tim focuses on stopping a recurring foe during his time as Batman, Davis Dusk aka Rewire. Rewire is revealed to be an alive Terry McGinnis, who was brainwashed by the villain Spellbinder (who projects himself to Terry as an old woman named Doris Shelby) into thinking he was Davis Dusk and that Batman wanted him dead. Terry used the Rewire suit to instigate four nights of power outages, causing riots which kept the police and Batman distracted from Spellbinder's activities. After Rewire fights Barbara and she discovers his true identity, Terry knocks her out and brings her to Blackgate, where Spellbinder brainwashes her too. Tim shows up to Blackgate and faces off against the brainwashed Barbara and Rewire. After Tim knocks off Rewire's helmet and discovers that Terry's alive (which he realizes was caused by altering the timeline in the past), Matt takes the Batmobile to Blackgate and distracts Terry from Tim by trying to free him from Spellbinder's illusion. Tim ultimately defeats Spellbinder and Terry's memories are restored. The four of them return to the Batcave, where Tim gives the mantle of Batman back to Terry and leaves to learn more about this foreign world. Though saddened by Tim's departure, the group is glad that Terry is back as Batman.

== Batman Beyond (vol. 6) DC Rebirth series (2016–2020) ==
DC Comics announced another ongoing Batman Beyond series would be released in October 2016. It takes place after the previous series, with Terry McGinnis returning as the titular character, where he must deal the Jokerz after they take over a section of the city and plan to resurrect the deceased Joker. The series is written by Dan Jurgens and drawn by Bernard Chang.

After returning to the Batcave, Bruce becomes concerned about Terry's new suit. Meanwhile, Curare is on the run from the League of Assassins and breaks into the GCPD to tell Commissioner Gordon she needs to speak with Batman. The two go on the rooftop to activate the Bat-Signal, but are ambushed by the League in the process. Terry brings Dana back to her house and tells her that he will prioritize his own life before Batman's duties and not end up like Bruce. When Barbara turns on the Bat-Signal, Terry initially chooses to ignore it before Bruce contacts Dana with footage of the fight to get Terry to help. Batman assists Barbara and Curare, though he is noticeably more brutal in his approach. After the fight, Curare shows Batman a video confirming that Ra's al Ghul is alive. Bruce orders Terry to return to the Batcave to discard the suit, as it was a prototype that Bruce built with an artificial intelligence that blocks the wearer's pain. Bruce used it in his last mission to stop a group of criminals called the Banes, and the injuries sustained from his suit ended his career as Batman. Terry refuses to return and heads to Ghul's hideout in the Himalayas with Curare's flier as she is critically wounded by the Demon's right-hand man, Koru. Bruce follows Terry, worrying about Ghul's return and the suit's effect on him. After Terry defeats Ghul's forces, Ra's comes out to battle Terry himself; claiming that Terry is nothing more than a pretender to Batman's legacy. During their fight, Terry knocks off Ghul's mask, revealing that he is Bruce's son and the former Robin, Damian Wayne. Damian had joined forces with Ra's al Ghul after realizing that Bruce was too focused on Gotham rather than the world and became his grandfather's successor as Ra's could no longer use the Lazarus Pits to prolong his life.

== Batman Beyond: Neo-Year series (2022) ==
In September 2021, it was revealed that a new series would follow Terry McGinnis as he navigates being Batman without the guidance of the recently deceased Bruce Wayne and a Gotham City that's against him.

=== Synopsis ===
With Bruce Wayne dead, Terry McGinnis must keep the legacy of Batman alive in Gotham City as a deadly A.I. begins hunting him. With no mentor and a Gotham City completely against him, Terry must use the limited resources he has to face this new state-of-the-art A.I. that's emerged in Neo-Gotham. Terry must also face his old adversaries, the Jokerz as he turns to Commissioner Barbara Gordon for help.

== Batman Beyond: Neo-Gothic series (2023) ==
In April 2023, it was revealed that the creative team behind Neo-Year would reunite for a sequel miniseries, titled Batman Beyond: Neo-Gothic.

== Collected editions ==
Numerous miniseries have been reprinted under the same title as collections. This section lists only reprints from ongoing series. All were issued in trade paperback format unless noted otherwise.

| Title | Material collected | Publication date | ISBN |
|---|---|---|---|
| Batman Beyond | Batman Beyond (Vol. 1) #1-6 | March 1, 2000 | 1-56389604-4/978-1-56389604-0 |
| Batman Beyond: Hush Beyond | Batman Beyond (Vol. 3) #1-6 | March 2, 2011 | 978-1-4012-2988-7 |
| Batman Beyond: Industrial Revolution | Batman Beyond (Vol. 4) #1-8 | January 25, 2012 | 978-1-4012-3374-7 |
| Batman Beyond: 10,000 Clowns | Batman Beyond stories from Batman Beyond Unlimited #1-13 Batman Beyond digital chapters #1-16 | May 15, 2013 | 978-1-4012-4034-9 |
| Justice League Beyond: Konstriction | Justice League Beyond stories from Batman Beyond Unlimited #1-10 Justice League Beyond digital chapters #1-16 | May 15, 2013 | 978-1-4012-4023-3 |
| Superman Beyond: Man of Tomorrow | Superman Beyond #0, Superman/Batman Annual #4 and Superman Beyond stories from Batman Beyond Unlimited #1-10 Superman Beyond digital chapters #1-10 | April 24, 2013 | 978-1-4012-3823-0 |
| Justice League Beyond: In Gods We Trust | Justice League Beyond and Superman Beyond stories from Batman Beyond Unlimited #10-17 Justice League Beyond digital chapters #17-25 and Superman Beyond digital chapters #11-20 | March 19, 2014 | 978-1-4012-4754-6 |
| Batman Beyond: Batgirl Beyond | Batman Beyond stories from Batman Beyond Unlimited #11-18 (Batman Beyond digital chapters #17-29) and Batman Beyond (series 2) #1-2 | April 2, 2014 | 978-1-4012-4753-9 |
| Justice League Beyond: Power Struggle | Justice League Beyond stories from Batman Beyond Universe #1-8 Justice League Beyond 2.0 digital chapters #1-16 | October 1, 2014 | 978-1-4012-5073-7 |
| Batman Beyond 2.0: Rewired | Batman Beyond stories from Batman Beyond Universe #1-8 Batman Beyond 2.0 digital chapters #1-16 | November 5, 2014 | 978-1-4012-5060-7 |
| Batman Beyond 2.0: Justice Lords Beyond | Batman Beyond Universe #9-12 Batman Beyond 2.0 digital chapters #17-24 and Justice League Beyond 2.0 digital chapters #17-24 | March 11, 2015 | 978-1-4012-5464-3 |
| Batman Beyond 2.0: Mark of the Phantasm | Batman Beyond Universe #13-16 Batman Beyond 2.0 digital chapters #25-40 | September 9, 2015 | 978-1-4012-5801-6/1-4012-5801-8 |
| DC Comics Sneak Peek Batman Beyond | Batman Beyond (2015) #1 (sneak peek) | May 20, 2015 | |
| Batman Beyond Volume 1 Brave New Worlds | Batman Beyond (vol. 5) #1-6 | March 9, 2016 | 978-1-4012-6191-7 |
| Batman Beyond Volume 2 City of Yesterday | Batman Beyond (vol. 5) #7-11 | September 28, 2016 | 978-1-4012-6470-3 |
| Batman Beyond Volume 3 Wired for Death | Batman Beyond (vol. 5) #12-16; Batman Beyond: Rebirth #1 (sneak peek) | February 22, 2017 | 978-1-4012-7039-1 |
| Batman Beyond Vol. 1: Escaping the Grave | Batman Beyond: Rebirth #1; Batman Beyond (vol. 6) #1-5 | June 28, 2017 | 978-1-4012-7103-9 |
| Batman Beyond Vol. 2: Rise of the Demon | Batman Beyond (vol. 6) #6-12 | January 16, 2018 | 978-1-4012-7522-8 |
| Batman Beyond Vol. 3: The Long Payback | Batman Beyond (vol. 6) #13-19 | August 14, 2018 | 978-1-4012-8036-9 |
| Batman Beyond Vol. 4: Target: Batman | Batman Beyond (vol. 6) #20-24 | January 1, 2019 | 978-1-4012-8563-0 |
| Batman Beyond Vol. 5: The Final Joke | Batman Beyond (vol. 6) #25-30 | July 30, 2019 | 978-1-4012-9208-9 |
| Batman Beyond Vol. 6: Divide, Conquer, and Kill | Batman Beyond (vol. 6) #31-36 | February 4, 2020 | 978-1-4012-9547-9 |
| Batman Beyond Vol. 7: First Flight | Batman Beyond (vol. 6) #37-42 | July 21, 2020 | 978-1-77950-287-2 |
| Batman Beyond Vol. 8: The Eradication Agenda | Batman Beyond (vol. 6) #43-50 | March 16, 2021 | 978-1-77950-573-6 |
| Batman Beyond: Neo-Year | Batman Beyond: Neo-Year #1-6 | February 14, 2023 | 978-1779517562 |
| Batman Beyond: Neo-Gothic | Batman Beyond: Neo-Gothic #1-6 | June 11, 2024 | 978-1779525154 |
