= Matter Master =

- Matter Master as seen in Hawkman #23 (March 2004).

Publication information
- Publisher: DC Comics
- First appearance: The Brave and the Bold #35 (May 1961)
- Created by: Gardner Fox; Joe Kubert

In-story information
- Alter ego: Mark Mandrill
- Species: Human
- Team affiliations: Secret Society of Super Villains; The Society; Injustice Society
- Abilities: Matter manipulation via "Mentachem" wand Genius intelligence

The Matter Master is a supervillain appearing in American comic books published by DC Comics, a recurring foe of Hawkman. Created by Gardner Fox and Joe Kubert, he first appeared in The Brave and the Bold #35 (May 1961).

== Fictional character history ==
Scientist turned alchemist Mark Mandrill is trying to turn lead into gold when the compound he is working on explodes. Instinctively shouting "Stay away from me!", he is amazed when the compound obeys his commands. Dubbing the material "Mentachem", he makes a wand out of it and uses it to begin a life of crime. He fights against Hawkman for many years, as well as the Justice League of America. He is also a member of the Secret Society of Super Villains.

Matter Master later resurfaces in St. Roch, kidnapping rich people to draw Hawkman into a confrontation. The battle lasts only a few seconds, ending when Hawkman severs Matter Master's right arm with his axe. Mandrill later returns to the league with a team of other villains who had been victims of mind-wipes by the JLA.

== Powers and abilities ==
Matter Master has no innate superpowers. Using his Mentachem wand, he can reshape, transmute, or levitate any matter. The effect vanishes over time or as soon as he loses contact with the wand. He also has a genius level intellect.

== Other versions ==
A heroic Earth-Three version of Mandrill exists as Matter Mage and a member of the Justice Society All Stars.

== In other media ==
- Matter Master appears in Justice League Unlimited #31.
- An original incarnation of the Matter Master, Carson Jatts, appears in Batman Beyond. This version is a metahuman control officer who developed cancer from continuous exposure to their energy. Seeking revenge, Jatts tries to steal the Metachem wand but accidentally absorbs its energy, giving him the power to transmute elements by touch and accelerating his condition. After being injured in an altercation with the Justice League, Jatts uses his powers to restore his body, dubbing himself the new Matter Master.
- Matter Master makes a cameo appearance in The All-New Batman: The Brave and the Bold #9.
