= Shayera Hol =

Hawkwoman
- Shayera Hol (Hawkwoman)'s design for DC Round Robin 2022. Art by Fico Ossio.

Publication information
- Publisher: DC Comics
- First appearance: The Brave and the Bold #34 (March 1961)
- Created by: Gardner Fox; Joe Kubert

In-story information
- Full name: Shayera Thal II (Birth name); Shayera Hol (Married name)
- Species: Thanagarian
- Team affiliations: Justice League; Justice Society of America
- Partnerships: Hawkman (Katar Hol)
- Notable aliases: Hawkgirl; Hawkwoman
- Abilities: Flight via Nth Metal feathered wings; Reincarnation via Nth Metal knife; Highly skilled armed and unarmed combatant; Superhuman strength and super-acute vision; Healing factor; Ability to communicate with birds; Utilizes Nth Metal gravity-defying belt and archaic weaponry; Temperature regulation; Multilingualism; Has exceptional senses and hearing thanks to long-term exposure to Nth Metal; Superhuman endurance; Enhanced hearing, vision, strength, durability, and stamina

Shayera Hol, birth name Shayera Thal II, is a superheroine appearing in American comic books during the Silver Age of Comics published by DC Comics. The character was created by writer Gardner Fox and artist Joe Kubert, and first appeared in The Brave and the Bold #34 (March 1961). A revised version of the original Hawkgirl, she is instead portrayed as an alien from the planet Thanagar and is often depicted as a redhead.

Like other Hawkgirls, she is a reincarnation of Chay-Ara and Shrra and a superheroine who uses archaic weaponry and Nth metal although her name is phonetically identical to her past incarnation ("Shiera Hall"), whose identity she also uses. Shayera is initially a Thanigarian law enforcement officer trained under decorated officer and hero, Katar Hol. While not getting along initially, the pair grew closer till the point of marriage and eventually, Shayera would become the second Hawkgirl, studying Earth's crime fighting methods while maintaining the cover of archaeologist museum curator using her past identity alongside her husband. She eventually instead uses the Hawkwoman codename due to the negative connotations associated with "girl" in her moniker. A revamped version following Crisis on Infinite Earths cast her similarly as Hawkwoman, a law enforcement officer and partner to Katar Hol, and an ambassador although aspect of her background differed.

The character has since appeared in various media following her inception in the comics, most notably in the DC Animated Universe voiced by Maria Canals-Barrera. While much of her comic book history using the "Hawkwoman" moniker, she appears in most media as "Hawkgirl".

== Publication history ==
With the fading popularity of superheroes during the late 1940s, the Hawkman feature ended in the last issue of Flash Comics in 1949. In 1956, DC Comics resurrected the Flash by revamping the character with a new identity and backstory. Following the success of the new Flash, DC Comics revamped Hawkman in a similar fashion with The Brave and the Bold #34 in 1961. The Silver Age versions of Hawkman and Hawkgirl were married alien police officers from the planet Thanagar who came to Earth to study police techniques. Silver Age Hawkgirl is introduced as Shayera (phonetically identical to first Shierra, then Shiera Hall), who appears in costume as of her first appearance. Although Silver Age Hawkman joins the Justice League in Justice League of America #31 in 1964, Silver Age Hawkgirl was not offered membership because Justice League rules only allowed for one new member to be admitted at a time. Many years later, Silver Age Hawkgirl joined the Justice League of America with issue #146 in 1977. In 1981, Silver Age Hawkgirl changed her code name to Hawkwoman in the Hawkman backup feature of World's Finest Comics #272.

With the establishment of DC's multiverse system, the Golden Age Hawkgirl was said to have lived on Earth-Two and the Silver Age Hawkgirl on Earth-One.

== Fictional character biography ==
Shayera Thal, the Silver Age version of Hawkgirl / Hawkwoman, was a law enforcement officer from the planet Thanagar and wife of Katar Hol, the Silver Age Hawkman and was a member of the Justice League of America.

She was born and raised on Thanagar, which had a scientifically advanced civilization in which crime was virtually unknown. As an adolescent, Shayera Thal joined the Thanagarian police force and was assigned to assist the force's most decorated officer, Katar Hol, in capturing the Dragonfly Robbers. She introduces herself as "Policewoman Shayera Thal". At first, Katar was furious at being assigned to an inexperienced young woman as a partner, but he nevertheless became strongly attracted to her.

Shayera Thal on the cover to Hawkman (vol. 2) #6. Art by Richard Howell.

Together, they captured the Dragonfly Robbers in their stronghold found behind a waterfall; while on the case, Shayera saved Katar's life and the two fell deeply in love. A few weeks later, Katar proposed to Shayera in front of the same waterfall. She accepted and they were married. Ten years later, the couple was sent to Earth in pursuit of the criminal Byth Rok. Upon reaching Earth, they were befriended by Midway City police commissioner George Emmett, who established cover identities for them as Carter and Shiera Hall. After capturing Byth and bringing him back to their planet, Katar and Shayera chose to return to study Earth's crimefighting methods, and they fought against evil as the superheroes Hawkman and Hawkgirl. Shayera renamed herself Hawkwoman in the early 1980s.

As Hawkwoman, Shayera eventually joined her husband as a member of the Justice League. She was the first League member admitted as part of the League's vote to lift its prior twelve-member limitation. Her membership set precedent for the admission of Zatanna as the League's fifteenth member. Both Zatanna and Shayera became close friends.

As Shiera, she first worked as Carter's secretary, but later became co-director of the Midway City Museum. She has a sort of rivalry with the museum naturalist Mavis Trent who has her eyes on both Hawkman and Carter Hall.

Later, Thanagar had established itself as a military dictatorship bent on conquering other planets. Hawkman and Hawkwoman thwarted Thanagarian plans to invade Earth, destroying their own starship in the process. Hawkman and Hawkwoman remain on Earth, regarded as traitors by everyone on Thanagar. She helped her husband come to terms with the deaths they caused during the battle. Eventually, she changed her codename to Hawkwoman.

Shayera Thal in the cover of Justice League #15 (2019).

Following the events of DC's miniseries, Crisis on Infinite Earths, the histories of Earth-One and Earth-Two are merged. As a result, both Golden Age and Silver Age versions of Hawkman and Hawkgirl/Hawkwoman live on the same Earth. Initially, the Silver Age Hawkman and Hawkwoman were kept in continuity unchanged. They took Superman to Krypton (now a gas planet), briefly joined Justice League International, teamed-up with Atom, and helped Animal Man defuse a Thanagarian bomb during Invasion event. However, DC reversed this decision and rebooted Hawkman continuity after the success of the 1989 Hawkworld miniseries. Originally, Hawkworld retold the origins of Silver Age Hawkman and Hawkwoman. After becoming a success, DC Comics launched a Hawkworld ongoing series set in the present resulting in a complete reboot of Hawkman's continuity. By doing so, several continuity errors regarding Hawkman and Hawkwoman's Justice League appearances needed to be fixed.

Following the Convergence storyline, Shayera Thal is featured in the Hawkman: Convergence. She is shown working as a curator in a Gotham City museum while fighting as Hawkwoman also. At the end of the story her universe vanishes due to the Crisis happening, she is last seen flying with Hawkman.

=== DC Rebirth ===
Following Rebirth's continuity, Shayera Hol appeared in the Hawkman (vol. 5) series. She was shown in Thanagar alongside her partner Katar Hol. Later, Shayera appeared in the Justice League (vol. 2) issues #14-16 where she was shown as the empress of Thanagar Prime. Initially presenting herself as a friend and ally to the Justice League, she was revealed to be hiding many secrets from them, including a surviving Martian elder known as the Keep. It is revealed that Shayera used a device known as the Absorbacon and the Martian elder to create a fake construct of a restored Thanagar Prime, her people, and Katar Hol (the Savage Hawkman). After the death of the Martian elder, Shayera tries to keep her constructed reality from fading away but is unable to, saying goodbye to Katar one last time. It is revealed by Starman that the reason Shayera still exists despite being Kendra Saunders' immediate predecessor in their chain of resurrection is due to the Totality breaking said chain and splitting the two, making Shayera a completely independent being from Kendra. This was done by Perpetua as she feared what would happen if a whole Hawkgirl faced her at the end. Shayera assists the Justice League in their failed attempt to heal the Source Wall.

Shayera came back to Earth to help Carter Hall, who was infected by The Batman Who Laughs. As of that issue, Hawkwoman started acting as co-protagonist of the book alongside Hawkman.

Shayera is revealed to be the reincarnation of the Herald Shrra, a being akin to a biblical angel. She served an unnamed deity who had deemed the universe unworthy and condemned it to be destroyed by the Lord Beyond the Void. She sensed something that was good in Ktar Deathbringer, the original incarnation of Hawkman, and intervened in the deity's plans by appearing before Ktar in the aftermath of each battle, pushing him by guilt and shame to turn on the Lord Beyond the Void. As Ktar had made a bargain with the deity to reincarnate until he had saved as many people as he had killed, it punished Shrra for her defiance by stripping her of her divinity and condemning her to share his fate.

Hawkwoman teams up with Carter's old friends the Atom and Adam Strange to capture and cure Carter of his infection. They catch up to Sky Tyrant on an alien world where one of his previous incarnations, Titan Hawk, had hidden an artifact known as "The Key" which would have released the Lord Beyond the Void. They recover the Key and imprison Sky Tyrant on Carter's starship. When she touches the Key, her memories of all her past lives are unlocked. Sky Tyrant manages to escape his cell and brawls with the three heroes, he and Shayera touch the Key together and are transported to the realm of the Lord Beyond the Void. In the process, Carter is cured of his infection (all infected heroes were cured by Lex Luthor in the Year of the Villain: Hell Arisen oneshot). The pair are attacked by Deathbringers who recognise Carter as Ktar, and, although the Deathbringers are defeated, they draw the attention of the Lord Beyond the Void.

The Lord easily overpowers them and binds them to a great stone monolith, planning to absorb the energy from all their lives, which will give him sufficient power to cross over into the universe. Carter and Shayera release the power of their thousands of lives, overloading and destroying the Lord, while also killing themselves. They awake in the afterlife, reverted to Ktar and Shrra. The deity explains that Ktar's debt is repaid, and offers to allow him to pass on and to restore Shrra as a Herald, however, the two do not wish to be parted. Therefore, the deity offers them another reward, to be reincarnated a final time in their favourite lives, where they will be extremely long lived but mortal. The two agree and are restored to life in the 1940s as the Golden Age Hawkman and Hawkgirl and reunite with their old friends in the Justice Society of America.

During a fight with the Injustice Society, Carter freezes with fear at a moment when the villains have the upper hand. Shayera throws her mace into Carter's, creating an explosion which incapacitates the Injustice Society and turns the tide of the fight. The JSA assumes Carter was simply providing a distraction for Shayera, but he privately admits to her that now he is mortal, he fears dying. Meanwhile, Anton Hastor, an incarnation of the Hawks' ancient enemy Hath-Set, learns that Prince Khufu and Chay-Ara have been reincarnated, and this time, they can be killed permanently. Hastor steals his Nth Metal dagger from JSA headquarters and draws the Hawks out to a train where he has killed the passengers and resurrected them as zombies. Shayera is tackled off the train by zombies while Hastor attacks Carter, who is too fearful to fight back until Hastor threatens Shayera. Carter disarms Hastor by stabbing himself with the dagger just as Shayera catches up to the train and destroys the dagger. Shayera spends the following centuries as a hero alongside Carter, surviving into the 40th century.

Shayera appeared as a member of the Justice Society of America in the Dark Crisis event.

== Other versions ==
- An alternate universe version of Shayera Hol appears in Legend of the Hawkman.
- An alternate universe version of Shayera Hol appears in JLA: The Nail and JLA: Another Nail.
- An alternate universe version of Shayera Hol appears in The Dark Knight Strikes Again. This version and Katar Hol crash-landed in Costa Rica amidst in an attempt to return to Thanagar before being killed by Lex Luthor. Their two children are subsequently raised in the jungle, with one becoming known as Hawkboy and killing Luthor.
- An alternate universe version of Shayera Hol appears in Justice.
- An alternate universe version of Shayera Hol, inspired by the DC Animated Universe incarnation (see below), appears in DC New Talents Showcase.

== In other media ==
=== Television ===
Shayera as she appears in Justice League.

- Shayera Hol / Hawkgirl appears in The All-New Super Friends Hour, voiced by Shannon Farnon.
- Shayera Hol / Hawkgirl appears in Super Friends, voiced by Janet Waldo.
- Shayera Hol / Hawkgirl appears in series set in the DC Animated Universe (DCAU), voiced by Maria Canals-Barrera. This version is a member of the Thanagarian Armed Forces who wields an Nth Metal mace capable of disrupting magical and energy-based forces, is an expert hand-to-hand combatant, and came to Earth as an advance scout and spy for the Thanagarian military. Furthermore, during development, the series producers reworked her personality to contrast with Wonder Woman and included her over Black Canary so that a member of the "Hawk family" was represented.
  - Shayera first appears in Justice League. In the three-part pilot episode "Secret Origins", she becomes a founding member of the eponymous team after they join forces to fend off an alien invasion of Earth. Throughout the series, Shayera maintains a distant relationship with the League, but develops a sibling-like bond with the Flash and a romantic relationship with Green Lantern. In the three-part series finale "Starcrossed", Shayera reveals her true colors after her people arrive to gain Earth's support in their war with the Gordanians. She initially rejoins her kind as well as her commanding officer and fiancé Hro Talak, which creates a rift between her and Lantern. When she learns of their plan to attack the Gordanians' homeworld by building a warp gate, which will destroy the Earth in the process, she betrays her people and returns to the League to inform them. The League eventually defeat the Thanagarians, who leave Shayera behind as a traitor. While the League vote to decide whether she should stay on the team, she resigns before hearing their verdict.
    - Additionally, an alternate universe version of Hawkgirl who became a member of the Justice Lords appears in the two-part episode "A Better World".
  - Shayera appears in the Static Shock two-part episode "A League of Their Own", which takes place during Justice League and prior to "Starcrossed". She and the League join forces with Static and Gear to defeat Brainiac after he rebuilds himself in the League's Watchtower.
  - Shayera appears in Justice League Unlimited. Following her departure from the League, she came to stay with Doctor Fate and his wife Inza Nelson in the former's tower stronghold in an effort to decide what to do with her life. In the episode "Wake the Dead", she rejoins the League and learns that they allowed her to stay, but continues to experience opposition, particularly from Wonder Woman and Lantern's new girlfriend Vixen. In particular, Wonder Woman holds a grudge against Shayera until the episode "The Balance", when she is forced to take Shayera to stop Felix Faust after he usurps Hades's throne, during which the two Leaguers settle their differences. In the episode "Hunter's Moon", Shayera, Vixen, and Vigilante are assigned to a rescue mission on a distant moon, but are met with Thanagarians who blame Shayera for the Gordanians defeating them following her betrayal. While Shayera is tempted to turn herself in, her teammates refuse to let her go. Following this, Shayera and Vixen work out their differences as well, with the former discovering she still has feelings for Stewart, who remains with Vixen despite learning of his and Shayera's future son Warhawk. By the series finale "Destroyer", Shayera and Stewart resolve to remain friends. Series creator Bruce Timm said in an interview that while he was deliberately ambiguous about the future of their relationship and understood some fans disliked where it was left at the series finale, it was his opinion that "You can put two and two together and imagine what happens".
- Shayera Hol / Hawkwoman appears in Young Justice, voiced by Zehra Fazal. This version is a member of the Justice League.
- Shayera Hol / Hawkgirl makes a cameo appearance in the Teen Titans Go! episode "Some of Their Parts".

=== Film ===
- Shayera Hol / Hawkwoman makes a cameo appearance in Justice League: The New Frontier.
- Shayera Hol / Hawkgirl appears in Teen Titans Go! To the Movies.
- Shayera Hol / Hawkgirl appears in Green Lantern: Beware My Power, voiced by Jamie Gray Hyder.
- Shayera Hol / Hawkgirl appears in Justice League: Crisis on Infinite Earths, voiced again by Jamie Gray Hyder.

=== Video games ===
- Shayera Hol / Hawkgirl appears as a playable character in Justice League: Injustice for All.
- Shayera Hol / Hawkgirl appears as a playable character in Justice League: Chronicles.
- Shayera Hol / Hawkgirl, with elements of Kendra Saunders, appears in DC Universe Online, voiced by Lana Lesley.
- Shayera Hol / Hawkgirl appears as a modifier in Injustice 2's "Multiverse" mode.
- Shayera Hol / Hawkgirl appears as a playable character in Lego DC Super-Villains, voiced by Tiffany Smith.

=== Miscellaneous ===
- The DCAU incarnation of Shayera Hol / Hawkgirl appears in the tie-in comics Justice League Adventures, Justice League Unlimited, and Justice League Beyond. In the third part, she rekindles her relationship with Green Lantern after Vixen is killed by the Shadow Thief and they go on to get married, have Warhawk, and retire from the Justice League to focus on raising him.
- Shayera Hol / Hawkgirl appears in All-New Batman: The Brave and the Bold.
- The DCAU incarnation of Shayera Hol / Hawkgirl appears in Justice League Infinity.
