= Shadow Thief =

- Carl Sands as depicted in Hawkman (vol. 5) #14 (September 2019). Art by Patrick Olliffe (penciller) and Tom Palmer (inker).

Publication information
- Publisher: DC Comics
- First appearance: Carl Sands: The Brave and the Bold #36 (July 1961); Carl Hammer: Vigilante #14 (February 1985)
- Created by: Carl Sands: Gardner Fox (writer); Joe Kubert (artist); Carl Hammer: Marv Wolfman (writer); Trevor Von Eeden (artist)

In-story information
- Alter ego: Carl Sands; Carl Hammer; Aviva Metula
- Team affiliations: Carl Sands: The Society; Injustice League; Injustice Society; Aviva Metula: Mossad; The Society
- Abilities: Carl Sands: Dimensiometer grants: Ability to shift his body into a two-dimensional, and intangible, shadow state Deal with Neron: transmogrify anything his power touches into shadow, teleportation using shadows Starbreaker enhancement: Individual shadow manipulation, drawing strength from shadows around him, darkness based constructs, inter-dimensional travel Carl Hammer: Shadow suit grants: Ability to become invisible in shadows Aviva Metula: Trained martial artist Shadow armor grants: Intangibility; Flight; Teleportation; Limited shapeshifting

Shadow Thief is the name of three supervillains appearing in American comic books published by DC Comics. The first is a recurring foe of Hawkman named Carl Sands. The second Shadow Thief is an African-American named Carl Hammer who wore a shadow suit. The third Shadow Thief is Aviva Metula, a former agent of Mossad with an anti-alien stance.

Shadow Thief appeared in the seventh season episode of the Arrowverse television series Arrow, portrayed by Carmel Amit.

== Publication history ==
The Carl Sands version of Shadow Thief first appeared in The Brave and the Bold #36 (July 1961) and was created by writer Gardner Fox and artist Joe Kubert.

The Carl Hammer version of Shadow Thief first appeared in Vigilante #14 (February 1985) and was created by writer Marv Wolfman and artist Trevor Von Eeden.

== Fictional character biography ==
=== Carl Sands ===
==== Pre-Crisis ====
Carl Sands is a career criminal who conducted experiments on shadow projection while in jail. The experiments allowed him to make contact with an alien explorer named Thar Dan from the Xarapion Dimension. In return for saving the creature's life, Sands was given a device known as a Dimensiometer and a pair of ebony gloves that allows him to hold objects while in shadow form.

Hawkman eventually defeats him, but Shadow Thief would come into conflict with him many times after that. He would later become a member of the Injustice Gang which came into conflict with Hawkman and his allies, the Justice League of America.

Eventually, the Phantom Stranger had him permanently stripped of the Dimensiometer.

==== Post-Crisis/Post-Hawkworld ====
While growing up in Japan, American Carl Sands learned ninjutsu techniques and became an industrial saboteur, accepting unremarkable sums to hinder and eliminate his clients' rivals. The Thanagarian criminal Byth Rok hires Sands to steal Hawkman and Hawkwoman's ship and gives him a Thanagarian belt that gives him the ability to shift his body into a shadow form.

During the "Underworld Unleashed" storyline, Shadow Thief sells his soul to Neron for more power. The demon gives Sands a more powerful shadow suit which is tinged with magic and has augmented abilities.

Shadow Thief later appears as a member of the Injustice League, and is one of the villains featured in Salvation Run.

==== DC Rebirth ====
In 2016, DC Comics implemented a relaunch of its books called "DC Rebirth", which restored its continuity to a form much as it was prior to "The New 52" reboot. Carl Sands appears as a low-level enemy of Hawkman who utilizes the Shadow Vest that enables him to shift through solid objects. Lex Luthor upgrades Shadow Thief's suit, giving him the ability to control shadows.

In the series JSA, Shadow Thief appears as a member of Scandal Savage's Injustice Society.

=== Carl Hammer ===
Carl Hammer, artist Trevor Von Eeden.

The second Shadow Thief is an African-American man named Carl Hammer. He is a crime boss and the brother of Mr. Hammer, with each trying to outdo each other. Hammer states that he paid more than one million dollars to have the suit made. He used the Shadow Suit to target his brother and encountered Vigilante, who kills Mr. Hammer in self-defense.

=== Aviva Metula ===
In 2011, The New 52 rebooted the DC universe. A female Shadow Thief was introduced.

In Stargirl's origin story, Shadow Thief was taking hostages to draw out a superhero. When Stargirl returned home, she found that Shadow Thief arrived first, killed Courtney's brother, and wounded her mother Barbara. Stargirl's trauma motivated her to become a better superhero.

During the Forever Evil storyline, it is revealed that this version of Shadow Thief is a former agent of Mossad named Aviva Metula. Metula wears a suit of armor called the Shadow Skin that gives her powers. She became Shadow Thief to kill alien invaders, making her a dangerous foe for Hawkman.

== Powers and abilities ==
Carl Sands uses a Dimensiometer, Thanagarian technology which enables him to transform into an intangible, shadow-like state. While the vest is activated, he can move quickly and silently across and through most surfaces and materials, all the while remaining impervious to physical contact and attack. Long-term side effects from prolonged use of the vest are unknown although, prior to Crisis on Infinite Earths, it was stated that overuse of the suit would accelerate Earth's climate into an ice age. Shadow Thief would later sell his soul to Neron for augmented equipment. Now his suit, as was he, had been granted magical abilities which enabled him to convert objects and people into unsubstantiated shadowy material (a process which was inconceivably painful to living things), while transporting himself through shadows as well. Carl's abilities would be augmented further still when Starbreaker gives him the power to draw strength from the darkness within. Now no longer needing the shadow suit to utilize his powers, Sands can literally draw upon the absence of light that is situated all around him, enabling the manifestation of depleted photons to form constructs ranging from weapons to planetoids, creating portals, and turning his opponents' shadows into living duplicates of themselves all with the same abilities.

The shadow suit Carl Hammer had constructed only allowed him to become invisible in shadows and did not render him intangible.

The Shadow Skin armor provides Aviva Metula with intangibility, teleportation, flight, and limited shapeshifting, enabling her to turn her arms into weapons. She is also a trained martial artist.

== Other versions ==
Many alternate universe versions of Shadow Thief have appeared throughout the character's publication history.

=== Earth-Three ===
On Earth-Three, a world where heroes are villains and vice versa, Shadow Sheriff is a member of the Justice Society All-Stars.

=== Tangent Comics ===
In the Tangent Comics universe, an imprint based on completely re-imagining characters, Shadow Thief is a member of the Fatal Five.

== In other media ==
=== Television ===
- An original incarnation of Shadow Thief appears in the Superman episode "Night of the Living Shadows". This version is McFarlane who lives in Metropolis' Suicide Slum and wields a LexCorp-designed suit.
- An original incarnation of Shadow Thief appears in Justice League Unlimited, voiced by James Remar. This version is the physical manifestation of Carter Hall's inner darkness who was created after he came into contact with the Absorbacron, a Thanagarian computer. He attempts to kill Green Lantern to have Hawkgirl to himself, only to be defeated and reabsorbed by Hall.
- The Carl Sands incarnation of Shadow Thief appears in The Batman episode "What Goes Up...", voiced by Diedrich Bader. This version works for Black Mask.
- The Aviva Metula incarnation of Shadow Thief appears in the Arrow episode "Lost Canary", portrayed by Carmel Amit. This version is an associate of Black Siren and Ricardo Diaz.

=== Video games ===
The Carl Sands incarnation of Shadow Thief appears as a character summon in Scribblenauts Unmasked: A DC Comics Adventure.

=== Miscellaneous ===
- The Justice League Unlimited incarnation of Shadow Thief appears in a flashback in Justice League Beyond. After escaping from Hall, he seeks revenge on Green Lantern by killing his girlfriend Vixen in Paris as he is about to propose to her. In retaliation, Green Lantern works with Hawkgirl and Adam Strange to find Shadow Thief, who he later shoots and leaves to be eaten by alien beasts to save Hawkgirl's life.
- An unidentified Shadow Thief makes a cameo appearance in All-New Batman: The Brave and the Bold #9.
