= Howard Porter =

Howard Porter may refer to:

- Howard Porter (artist), American comic book artist from southern Connecticut
- Howard Porter (basketball) (1948–2007), American basketball player
- Howard Porter (manufacturer), an Australian industrial company
