= Justice League (TV series) =

American animated television series

- Genre: Adventure, Crossover, Drama, Science fantasy & Superhero
- Based on: Justice League by Gardner Fox & DC Comics
- Developed by: Bruce Timm
- Showrunner: Bruce Timm
- Directed by: Butch Lukic; Dan Riba; Andrea Romano (voice director)
- Voices of: Kevin Conroy George Newbern Susan Eisenberg Phil LaMarr Michael Rosenbaum Carl Lumbly Maria Canals-Barrera
- Theme music composer: Lolita Ritmanis
- Composer: Michael McCuistion Kristopher Carter Lolita Ritmanis
- Country of origin: United States
- Original language: English
- No. of seasons: 2
- No. of episodes: 52 (list of episodes)

Production
- Executive producer: Sander Schwartz Jean MacCurdy (S01, E01–09)
- Producer: Rich Fogel Glen Murakami Bruce Timm James Tucker
- Editor: Joe Gall
- Running time: 20–22 minutes
- Production companies: Warner Bros. Family Entertainment; Warner Bros. Animation (Note: Credited as Warner Bros. Television Animation from 2001 to 2003.)

Original release
- Network: Cartoon Network
- Release: November 17, 2001 – May 29, 2004

Justice League is an American animated superhero television series, which aired on Cartoon Network from November 17, 2001, to May 29, 2004. The show was produced by Warner Bros. Animation. It is based on the Justice League of America and associated comic book characters published by DC Comics. It serves as a sequel to both Batman: The Animated Series (including The New Batman Adventures) and Superman: The Animated Series, as well as a prequel to Batman Beyond, and is the seventh series of the DC Animated Universe. The series ended after two seasons, but was followed by Justice League Unlimited, a successor series which aired for three seasons.

== Overview ==
Bruce Timm, who co-produced Batman: The Animated Series and Superman: The Animated Series in the 1990s, became producer on an animated series focusing on the Justice League. The roster consisted of Batman, Superman, Wonder Woman, Green Lantern (John Stewart), The Flash (Wally West), J'onn J'onzz, and Hawkgirl.

According to audio commentary on the DVD release of Season 2, the second-season finale "Starcrossed" was expected to be the final episode of the series. In February 2004, Cartoon Network announced a follow-up series, Justice League Unlimited, which premiered on July 31, 2004, and featured a larger roster of characters.

It is the first series in the DC Animated Universe to fully use digital ink and paint, also the first to be produced in widescreen starting in Season 2.

=== Production ===
Kevin Conroy reprised his voice role as Batman from Batman: The Animated Series (1992–1995), The New Batman Adventures (1997–1999), and Batman Beyond (1999–2001). Batman's costume was redesigned, but this time, his costume was a combination of his last three costumes. The same costume from The New Batman Adventures is retained, but with the blue highlights from the Batman: The Animated Series costume and the long ears from the Batman Beyond costume are added to the costume. Tim Daly, who voiced Superman in Superman: The Animated Series (1996–2000), did not reprise his role due to involvement with The Fugitive and was replaced by George Newbern. Both Newbern and Daly have voiced the character in different DC projects outside the DCAU, with Newbern becoming the longest-running actor to portray Superman.

Alongside Kevin Conroy and George Newbern as Superman, joining the rest of the main cast is Susan Eisenberg as Wonder Woman, Maria Canals-Barrera as Hawkgirl, Phil LaMarr as John Stewart, Michael Rosenbaum replacing Charlie Schlatter as the Flash, and Carl Lumbly as J'onn J'onzz.

Several actors in previous DCAU media also reprise their roles, including Dana Delany as Lois Lane, David Kaufman as Jimmy Olsen, Efrem Zimbalist Jr. as Alfred Pennyworth, Shelley Fabares and Mike Farrell as Jonathan and Martha Kent, Mark Hamill as the Joker, Clancy Brown as Lex Luthor, Corey Burton as Brainiac, Ron Perlman as Clayface, Arleen Sorkin as Harley Quinn, Peri Gilpin as Volcana, Diane Pershing as Poison Ivy, Mark Rolston as Firefly, Ted Levine as Sinestro, Brian George as Parasite, Michael Ironside as Darkseid, Michael Dorn as Kalibak, Lisa Edelstein as Mercy Graves, and Brad Garrett as Lobo. In the episode "Hereafter", Maria Canals-Barrera voiced Livewire and Corey Burton voiced Toyman and Metallo, replacing their respective original actors Lori Petty, Bud Cort, and Malcolm McDowell.

== Episodes ==
Season	Episodes	Originally released	
Season	Episodes	First released	Last released
1	26	November 17, 2001	November 9, 2002
2	26	July 5, 2003	May 29, 2004

Clip of the second part of the episode "Secret Origins".

== Voice cast ==
Cover art for the comic Justice League Adventures #1 (2002). Art by Bruce Timm and Alex Ross.

=== Main cast ===
- Kevin Conroy – Batman
- Maria Canals-Barrera – Hawkgirl
- Susan Eisenberg – Wonder Woman
- Phil LaMarr – Green Lantern
- Carl Lumbly – J'onn J'onzz
- George Newbern – Superman
- Michael Rosenbaum – Flash

== Home media ==
From 2006 to 2011, Warner Home Video (via DC Entertainment and Warner Bros. Family Entertainment) released the entire series of Justice League on DVD and Blu-ray, and presented in original broadcast version and story arc continuity order.

Season releases

Name	Disc	Release date	Ep #	Notes
Season One	DVD	March 21, 2006	26	Contains a set of 4 DVDs with all of the episodes from the first season as well as audio commentaries, interviews, and other special features.
Season One	Blu-ray	August 19, 2008	26	Season One has been re-mastered and re-issued as a set of 3 Blu-ray Discs (in full 1080p and with Dolby Digital 5.1 surround sound) with everything included on the prior release.
Season Two	DVD	June 20, 2006	26	Contains a set of 4 DVDs with all of the episodes from the second season as well as audio commentaries and a panel discussion involving the production team of the series (although the set packaging indicates a featurette hosted by voice actor Phil LaMarr, it is misprinted, the featurette is on Disc One instead of Disc Four). Despite the show having been produced in a widescreen format this release lacks anamorphic encoding.
Season Two	Blu-ray	July 26, 2011	26	Warner Home Video released Season Two on a two-disc (50GB each) Blu-ray set.

Warner Home Video also released another DVD set titled Justice League: The Complete Series. It contained all 91 episodes of Justice League and Justice League Unlimited on a 15-disc set with the 15th disc containing a bonus documentary. This was later re-packaged and sold as a 10-disc set without the bonus documentary.

Individual releases

DVD name	Release date	Additional information
Justice League	April 23, 2002	Contains all three parts of "Secret Origins". A mini-DVD version of this disc has also been released.
Justice on Trial	April 22, 2003	Contains "In Blackest Night" and "The Enemy Below".
Paradise Lost	July 22, 2003	Contains "Paradise Lost" and "War World".
Starcrossed The Movie	July 13, 2004	Contains "Starcrossed" in both widescreen and fullscreen.
The Brave and the Bold	October 19, 2004	Contains episodes "The Brave and the Bold" and "Injustice For All".

Boxsets

DVD name	Release date	Additional information
The Justice League Collection	April 13, 2004	Contains previous "Secret Origins", "Paradise Lost", and "Justice on Trial" DVDs
Challenge of the Super Friends to Justice League:	April 13, 2004	Contains the previously released "Justice League" (Secret Origins) DVD along with two Super Friends discs in a slip-case.
Justice League - The Complete Series	June 20, 2006	Contains Justice League seasons 1 & 2 along with Justice League Unlimited seasons 1 & 2. (Blu-ray/DVD release)
Justice League: 3-Pack Fun	July 19, 2011	Contains "The Brave and the Bold" and "Injustice For All"; As well as the Justice League Unlimited episodes: * "For The Man Who Has Everything" * "The Return," * "The Greatest Story Never Told," the Young Justice episodes: * "Independence Day" * "Fireworks," * "Welcome To Happy Harbor" * "Drop Zone".

=== Streaming ===
In September 2018, Justice League and its successor Justice League Unlimited was available on the DC Universe streaming service that lasted until January 2021, when it was replaced by DC Universe Infinite (for digital comics only), with video content (including the series) moved to HBO Max.

On March 1, 2026, Justice League and its successor Justice League Unlimited was one of the 100 Warner Bros.-owned animated series that added to the Fox Corporation-owned FAST/AVOD streaming service Tubi.

== Soundtrack ==
A 4-disc soundtrack of musical highlights from both seasons of Justice League was released by La-La Land Records in July 2016. It is a limited edition of 3000 units and can be ordered at the La-La Land Records website. The set includes tracks from fan-favorite episodes like "A Better World", "Hereafter", "Wild Cards", and "Starcrossed".

La-La Land are hoping to release a soundtrack for Justice League Unlimited as well, provided that sales of the Justice League soundtrack improve significantly and that there is sufficient demand from fans. A second Justice League volume may also follow if fans support the existing release.

== Broadcast history ==
The series premiere on November 17, 2001, set a Cartoon Network record with over 4.114 million viewers. This made it the channel's highest rated premiere, a record it would keep until September 13, 2009, when the world premiere of Scooby-Doo! The Mystery Begins gathered over 6.108 million viewers.

The show was aired in the Republic of Ireland on TG4 in both Irish and English from 6 September 2002 to 2007.

== Reception ==
Justice League Season 1 received acclaim for its portrayal of the superhero team and its engaging storytelling. WhatCulture praised the season for its exceptional execution, and highlighted the series' mature handling of themes such as relationships, trauma, and loss, which contributed to its broad appeal across different age groups. Den of Geek highlighted the show’s effective team dynamics, drawing a favorable comparison to Star Trek: The Next Generation for its exploration of character relationships. The Young Folks admired the show’s versatility, noting its ability to seamlessly shift between emotional, humorous, and epic moments. io9.com also appreciated the charm of the heroes’ initial team-up, benefiting from their backgrounds in previous animated series.

Despite its strengths, the season faced some criticism. CBR noted that the storytelling in Season 1 often felt superficial, with deeper narratives and character development emerging in later seasons. Filip Vukcevic of IGN agreed, pointing out uneven character development as a drawback but still finding the show entertaining overall. Oliver Sava of the AV Club countered this view by praising the expansive nature of the series and its multi-part episodes, which he felt contributed to a strong iteration of the Justice League. Indiewire ranked the show overall as the 20th best animated show of all time.

The second season of Justice League however, is considered to be one of the best seasons of the entire DC Animated Universe, with Oliver Sava from The A.V. Club writing "good enough isn't good enough." "That's the philosophy for Justice League season two, according to producer Bruce Timm on the DVD commentary, and this two-part season opener is the perfect example of that new attitude in action. Just as Batman: The Animated Series set a new standard for solo superhero cartoon excellence, Justice League season two is only eclipsed by Justice League Unlimited as the strongest superhero-team series. Everything is of higher quality this season: the direction, animation, music, sound effects, and most importantly, the stories."

== Accolades ==
Award	Year	Category	Nominee(s)	Result	Ref.
Annie Awards	2004	Outstanding Writing in an Animated Television Production	Paul Dini (for "Comfort & Joy")	Nominated	
Annie Awards	2006	Outstanding Directing in a Television Production	Dan Riba (for "Clash")	Nominated	
Cinema Audio Society Awards	2009	Outstanding Achievement in Sound Mixing for DVD Original Programming	Edwin O. Collins, Tim Borquez, Eric Freeman, and Doug Andorka	Nominated	
Gold Derby Awards	2007	Animated Series		Nominated	
Golden Reel Awards	2002	Best Sound Editing – Television Animated Series – Sound	Robert Hargreaves, Mark Keatts, George Brooks, and Kelly Ann Foley (for "In the Blackest Night, Part II")	Nominated	
Golden Reel Awards	2003	Best Sound Editing – Television Animated Series – Sound	Robert Hargreaves, Mark Keatts, George Brooks, and Kelly Ann Foley (for "Savage Time, Part I")	Nominated	
Golden Reel Awards	2004	Best Sound Editing – Television Animated Series – Sound	Robert Hargreaves, Mark Keatts, George Brooks, Mark Keefer, Kelly Ann Foley, and Kerry Iverson (for "Twilight, Part II")	Nominated	
Primetime Emmy Awards	2002	Outstanding Main Title Theme Music	Lolita Ritmanis	Nominated	
Rondo Hatton Classic Horror Awards	2002	TV Presentation of the Year		Runner-up	
Writers Guild of America Awards	2005	Animation	Rich Fogel, John Ridley, and Dwayne McDuffie (for "Starcrossed")	Nominated	

== Cancelled film ==
Circa 2004, Bruce Timm announced that a direct-to-video Justice League feature film was being produced to bridge the second season of Justice League and the first season of Justice League Unlimited. It was planned to reveal how Wonder Woman acquired her Invisible Plane and feature the Crime Syndicate as the main antagonists, an idea that was originally conceived for the episode "A Better World" until the Syndicate was replaced by the Justice Lords. Dwayne McDuffie wrote the script and Andrea Romano assembled the cast, but Warner Bros. finally scrapped the project. In 2010, the film was repurposed and released as Justice League: Crisis on Two Earths, a standalone film unconnected to the DCAU.

== Adaptations ==
=== Justice League Adventures ===
DC Comics published a series of 34-issue numbered comics based on the television series, between 2002 and 2004. However, while the comic would use the style of the animated show, it would often ignore its continuity and use backstories and personalities for characters based on the mainstream DC comics instead.

- #34 (2004-08-04): Guardians Against Darkness!

==== Compilations ====
- Justice League Adventures: The Magnificent Seven (2004-01-01): Includes #3, 6, 10–12.

== See also ==
- Justice League Unlimited
- Justice League: Crisis on Two Earths
