= Hath-Set =

Comic book character

Publication information
- Publisher: DC Comics
- First appearance: Flash Comics #1 (January 1940)
- Created by: Gardner Fox; Dennis Neville

In-story information
- Notable aliases: Doctor Anton Hastor, Hector Hall, Helene Astar, Matilda Dunney Roderic, Kristopher Roderic, Vandal Savage
- Abilities: Continuous cycle of reincarnation; possesses his descendants

Hath-Set is a DC Comics supervillain created by Gardner Fox and Dennis Neville. The character is the archenemy of Hawkman and Hawkgirl.

== Publication history ==
Hath-Set first appeared in Flash Comics #1 and was created by Gardner Fox and Dennis Neville.

== Fictional character biography ==
Hath-Set, a cruel Egyptian priest, leads a rebellion and captures and murders Prince Khufu and Princess Chay-Ara. He kills them with a cursed dagger which has been forged from Nth Metal. This results in a cycle where all three are reincarnated together. In many different incarnations over the centuries, Hath-Set murders Khufu and Chay-Ara's reincarnations.

=== Doctor Hastor ===
In the World War II era, Hath-Set is reincarnated as Anton Hastor. Hawkman (Khufu) and Hawkgirl (Chay-Ara) are reunited while facing Hastor. In 1941, Hastor kidnaps several prominent scientists and uses their talents and knowledge to build a flying airship with weaponry capable of leveling cities. His plans for world conquest are foiled by Hawkman and the All-Star Squadron. Hastor is killed by Hawkman with a crossbow.

=== Infinity Inc. ===
In Infinity, Inc, Hath-Set possesses Hector Hall, the son of Khufu and Chay-Ara (who are now called Carter Hall and Shiera Sanders Hall). With Hector under his control, Hath-Set attacks the team. The team defeat Hath-Set, but Hector dies. Hector is resurrected as the Sandman, taking over from the previous user of that name, Garrett Sanford.

=== Helene Astar ===
In his most recent incarnation, Hath-Set is a spirit who can control his descendants. The Hawks travel to the Himalayas to search for Speed Saunders. Hath-Set has taken over a woman called "Helene Astar". In attempting to kill the Hawks, Astar dies. The Hawks believe that Astar was a reincarnation of Hath-Set and that Hath-Set has been permanently killed. Hath-Set allies the villainous businessman Kristopher Roderic to kill Hawkman.

=== Brightest Day ===
In the Brightest Day storyline, Hath-Set is living in the jungles of Peru. He is allied with Queen Shrike (Khea), Hawkgirl's mother. Hath-Set collects the remains of Hawkman and Hawkgirl's past bodies and uses them to build a mystical gateway. Hawkman and Hawkgirl follow Hath-Set through this gateway to Hawkworld. Hawkgirl is captured by Hath-Set and Khea. The Life Entity tells Hawkgirl she must prevent Hath-Set from killing Hawkman. Hath-Set ties Hawkgirl to the mystical gateway. Following Khea's orders, Hath-Set strikes Hawkgirl in order to lure Hawkman. Hawkman arrives and distracts Hath-Set. Hawkgirl kills Hath-Set by snapping his neck.

=== DC Rebirth ===
In the DC Rebirth relaunch, Hat-Seth was born in prehistoric times. His life was a mixture of lies and half-truths woven by Barbatos. After an encounter with a time-displaced Batman, Hat-Seth founded the Judas Tribe, also called the Bat Tribe. Hath-Set made a weapon out of Nth Metal to slay the Chieftain of the Bird Tribe and his wife, causing all three to reincarnate.

Hath-Set returns in the pages of Hawkman. When Hawkman and Hawkwoman are reincarnated for a final time as their Golden Age incarnations, Anton Hastor realizes that the cycle of reincarnation has been broken and he will be able to kill the two for good and pass on to the afterlife. He steals his Nth Metal dagger from the JSA Brownstone and uses it to telepathically contact Hawkman. He murders the passengers of an entire train and raises them as zombies via necromancy. Hawkman is initially paralyzed by his fear of death, but overcomes it and disarms Hastor by stabbing himself with the dagger. He destroys the dagger and Hastor commits suicide by standing on a collapsing railway bridge. Hath-Set continues to be reincarnated throughout the centuries and attack the Hawks.

== Powers and abilities ==
Hath-Set can reincarnate into different descendants. He is also shown to be an expert at armed combat.

== In other media ==
- Hath-Set appears in a flashback in the Justice League Unlimited episode "Ancient History", voiced by Héctor Elizondo. This version was a servant of Katar and Chay-Ara Hol in ancient Egypt.
- Hath-Set, amalgamated with Vandal Savage, appears in media set in the Arrowverse, portrayed by Casper Crump.
- Hath-Set appears in the DC Super Hero Girls episode "#TheBirdAndTheBee", voiced by Sean Rohani. This version is a jackal-themed warrior who consistently ruins relationships between Hawkman and Hawkgirl.
