= Hawkgirl (Shiera Hall) =

DC Comics superheroine character

Shiera Sanders-Hall Hawkgirl
- Shiera Sanders Hall as Hawkgirl, on the cover of Sensation Comics vol. 2, 1 (March 1999); Art by Dave Johnson and Lee Loughridge

Publication information
- Publisher: DC Comics
- First appearance: (Hall); Flash Comics #1 (January 1940) (Hall as Hawkgirl); All Star Comics #5 (July 1941)
- Created by: (Hall); Gardner Fox; Dennis Neville (Hall as Hawkgirl); Sheldon Moldoff

In-story information
- Full name: Shiera Sanders-Hall
- Species: Metahuman
- Team affiliations: Justice Society of America; All-Star Squadron; Black Lantern Corps; Justice League; White Lantern Corps
- Partnerships: Hawkman (Carter Hall)
- Notable aliases: Hawkgirl
- Abilities: Flight via Nth metal feathered wings; Reincarnation via Nth metal knife; Immortality via reincarnation process; Highly skilled armed and unarmed combatant; Superhuman strength, senses, endurance, and vision; Accelerated healing; Telepathic communication with birds; Utilizes Nth metal gravity-defying belt and archaic weaponry; Temperature regulation; Multilingualism

Shiera Sanders-Hall is a superheroine, the first Hawkgirl appearing in American comic books published by DC Comics. Shiera Sanders Hall was created by writer Gardner Fox and artist Dennis Neville, and first appeared in Flash Comics #1 (January 1940) as a romantic interest of Hawkman (Carter Hall). Then later as one of DC's earliest super-heroines, she has appeared in many of the company's flagship team-up titles, including the Justice Society of America.

== Publication history ==
Created by writer Gardner Fox and artist Dennis Neville, Shiera Sanders first appeared in Flash Comics #1 (January 1940), in the same 12-page story in which Fox and Neville introduced Hawkman. Archaeologist Carter Hall has a dream that he is an ancient Egyptian prince, Khufu, who has a lover, named Shiera in the original story, or Princess Chay-Ara in modern retellings. The next day, Carter meets a woman named Shiera, who looks exactly like the woman in his dream. Carter dons the identity of Hawkman and Shiera becomes Carter's girlfriend. Shiera first appears as Hawkgirl in All Star Comics #5 (July 1941), in a costume created by Sheldon Moldoff, based on Neville's Hawkman costume. During Hawkman's solo segment of the Justice Society of America story, Shiera dons a spare set of Nth metal wings developed by Hawkman, and masquerades as Hawkman to trick some criminals. Shiera continues to wear the costume and wings in later stories, eventually adopting the identity of Hawkgirl.

With the establishment of DC's multiverse system, the Golden Age Hawkgirl was said to have lived on Earth-Two and the Silver Age Hawkgirl on Earth-One. Although Golden Age Hawkman makes his first Silver Age appearance during the first JLA/JSA team-ups in 1963 and continues making appearances during the annual JLA/JSA team-ups, Golden Age Hawkgirl does not reappear until 1976, in the revival of the All Star Comics monthly comic. During the publication gap between the cancellation of Hawkman at the end of the Golden Age and the reintroduction of Earth-Two Hawkman during the Silver Age, Golden Age Hawkman and Hawkgirl are married off-panel. Golden Age Hawkgirl made further appearances as the mother of Silver Scarab in the Infinity Inc. comic and as Hawkgirl as a member of the All-Star Squadron, a retroactive team of Golden Age heroes active in the 1940s.

=== Post-Crisis and One Year Later ===
Following the events of DC's miniseries, Crisis on Infinite Earths, the histories of Earth-One, Two, Four, S, and X were merged into one single Earth with a consistent past, present, and future. As a result, both the Golden Age and the Silver Age versions of Hawkman and Hawkgirl live on the same Earth. Shortly after Crisis on Infinite Earths, DC decided that having the Justice Society on the same Earth as all of the other superheroes was redundant and most of the team, including Golden Age Hawkman and Hawkgirl were given a sendoff in the Last Days of the Justice Society one-shot. The Justice Society were trapped in another dimension, Limbo, where they would battle for all of eternity to prevent Ragnarök from occurring on the Earth.

Shiera was resurrected after Blackest Night.

== Fictional character biography ==
Hawkgirl (Shiera Hall). Art by Ivan Reis.

Appearance of Shiera as a White Lantern in Justice League: Generation Lost.

Shiera is the reincarnation of the Egyptian princess Chay-Ara and the partner of Carter Hall, the Golden Age Hawkman. Centuries ago, Chay-Ara and her lover Prince Khufu were killed by Hath-Set with a knife forged from Nth metal. The properties of the metal and the strength of the duo's love created a bond between them, causing them to be reborn multiple times throughout the centuries. Some of her incarnations are:

- Lady Celia Penbrook, alive during 5th century Britain, and love of Silent Knight
- Cinnamon (also known as Kate Manser), an Old West gunslinger, and love of Nighthawk
- Sheila Carr, lady love of Pinkerton detective James Wright

In the early 20th century, Chay-Ara was reborn as Shiera Sanders. She was kidnapped by Dr. Anton Hastor (reincarnation of Hath-Set), but subsequently rescued by Hawkman (her reborn lover Khufu). Shiera became the hero's frequent ally and love interest. Eventually, she was granted a costume of her own and a belt of gravity-defying Nth metal, and joined him at his side as Hawkgirl.

The Hawks were members of the All-Star Squadron, and while Hawkman was a member of the Justice Society of America, Hawkgirl was not, only assisting the group on occasion. Following the events of DC's miniseries, Crisis on Infinite Earths, Shiera Hall joined the JSA. Eventually, Carter and Shiera married and had one son, Hector Hall, the previous Doctor Fate.

Through retcon, Carter and Shiera also joined the Justice League of America in the late 1980s, serving as liaisons between that group and the Justice Society.

Shiera died when she was merged with Carter and Katar Hol to form a new Hawkman version, a "hawk god" creature, during the events of Zero Hour, but was revived during the events of Blackest Night by the White Lantern ring.

== Other versions ==
=== DC Bombshells ===
In the DC Bombshells continuity set in World War II, Shiera is a technological genius and archaeologist who aids the Bombshells with her lover, Vixen. As Hawkgirl, she uses a jetpack rather than fly with wings, though when Cheetah forces her to build weapons out of ancient technology, she designs one with wings as well as a powerful mace.

Shiera grew up in an orphanage in Mexico. From a young age she had a passion for history and ancient cultures, as well as the magnificent structures that they built. She became an archaeologist and her work caught the eye of Hans Garber. He informed her of the Zambesi Amulets and the power that they possessed.

Intrigued, Shiera goes to Zambesi to try to discover the secret of the amulets. There she met Queen Mari of Zambesi and the two of them fell in love. Shiera stayed in Zambesi with Mari and became her personal mechanic, building gadgets to assist Mari against her enemies.

Hawkgirl discovers her true Thanagarian origins while fighting against Baroness Paula von Gunther. After connecting herself with an ancient mechanic god it's revealed to Shiera that her parents were members of the Wingmen of Thanagar, they sought to warn the humans upon the intentions of Thanagar who wished to conquer the Earth; due to their actions they were captured and murdered.

=== Bombshells: United ===
Hawkgirl appears as Shiera Hall in the continuation series to DC Comics Bombshells, Bombshells: United set in the United States in 1943. Shiera is shown in Zambesi alongside her lover, Vixen. Hawkgirl is later featured fighting against the Apokolips invasion on Earth.

== In other media ==
=== Television ===
- Shayera Hall / Hawkgirl appears in Smallville, portrayed by Sahar Biniaz. Introduced in the two-part episode "Absolute Justice", this version is of Indian descent and was a member of the Justice Society of America (JSA) who was killed by Icicle years prior. In the episode "Shield", Shayera appears as a hallucination to Carter Hall, who takes it as an omen that he will soon die and be reunited with her following their reincarnations.
- Shiera Hall / Hawkgirl appears in Stargirl, portrayed by an uncredited actor. This version is a member of the Justice Society of America who was killed by Brainwave a decade prior to the series.
- Shiera Sanders appears in the DC Super Hero Girls episode "#TheBirdAndTheBee", voiced by Stephanie Lemelin. This version works as a musician.
- Shayera Hall / Hawkgirl makes cameo appearances in Harley Quinn, voiced by Quinta Brunson.

=== Video games ===
- Shiera Sanders Hall / Hawkgirl appears as a playable character in Injustice: Gods Among Us, voiced by Jennifer Hale. This version is a member of the Justice League. Additionally, an alternate reality variant who supports High Councilor Superman's Regime appears as well.
- Shiera Sanders Hall / Hawkgirl appears as a character summon in Scribblenauts Unmasked: A DC Comics Adventure.

=== Miscellaneous ===
The Injustice incarnation of Shiera Sanders Hall / Hawkgirl appears in the Injustice: Gods Among Us prequel comic.
