= Hawkgirl =

Name of several female fictional superhero characters, all owned by DC Comics

- The Kendra Saunders and Shayera Hol versions of Hawkgirl. Art by Jim Cheung (penciler) and Tomeu Morey (colorist).

Publication information
- Publisher: DC Comics
- First appearance: Shiera Sanders: Flash Comics #1 (January 1940); All Star Comics #5 (June 1941) (as Hawkgirl); Shayera Thal: The Brave and the Bold #34 (March 1961); Kendra Saunders: JSA: Secret Files #1 (August 1999)
- Created by: (Hall); Gardner Fox; Dennis Neville; Sheldon Moldoff (Hol); Gardner Fox; Joe Kubert (Saunders); James Robinson; David Goyer

In-story information
- Full name: Shiera Sanders; Shayera Thal; Kendra Saunders
- Species: Metahuman (Kendra, Shiera); Thanagarian (Shayera)
- Place of origin: New York (Shiera); Thanagar (Shayera); Santa Augusta, Florida (Kendra)
- Team affiliations: Justice League; All-Star Squadron; Justice Society of America; Birds of Prey
- Partnerships: Hawkman (various); Doctor Fate (various); Black Adam
- Abilities: All versions of Hawkgirl are skilled hand-to-hand combat, skilled with archaic weaponry, and immortal life times grants tactical abilities and experience. They possess Nth metal boots, belts, and a harness, granting them enhanced durability, strength, and flight.

Altered in-story information for adaptations to other media
- Partnerships: John Stewart

Hawkgirl is the name of several different superheroines appearing in American comic books published by DC Comics. Since the debut of the original version, first created by writer Gardner Fox and artist Dennis Neville, and first appeared in Flash Comics #1 (January 1940), the character is often depicted as being from a line of immortal warriors affiliated with Hawkman, reincarnated and originating from different backgrounds, utilizes archaic forms of weaponry, powers intricately connected to the fictional Nth metal (often in the form of wings), and their alter-ego's names sometimes phonetically identical.

The original Hawkgirl, Shiera Hall (née Sanders), is considered one of DC Comics' earliest superheroines and is the chief love interest of the Carter Hall version of Hawkman. This version was present during the Golden Age, battling adversaries during the World War II era and was a member of the All-Star Squadron and the Justice Society of America. The second Hawkgirl, Shayera Hol (née Thal), was created by writer Gardner Fox and artist Joe Kubert, and first appeared in The Brave and the Bold #34 (March 1961). Active during the Silver Age, this version was an alien (Thanagarian) law enforcement officer trained under decorated Katar Hol and later arrived on Earth. Shayera later uses the "Hawkwoman" moniker instead. The third Hawkgirl, Kendra Saunders, is the current version; she is depicted as a Hispanic reincarnation who often seeks to distance herself from prior reincarnations while living her life as a superheroine in Superman's home city, Metropolis. Ultimately, Hawkgirl's first incarnation was originally the Egyptian Chay-Ara but later revealed to be Shrra, an angel and herald who advocated for Ktar Deathbringer's (Hawkman's original incarnation) redemption despite his crimes, leading her to be cursed alongside him until he can redeem himself.

Hawkgirl have all been adapted into various media, including direct-to-video animated films, video games, and both live-action and animated television series, featuring as a main or recurring character in the shows Justice League, Justice League Unlimited, The Flash, Arrow, Young Justice, DC Super Hero Girls and Legends of Tomorrow. In particular, Ciara Renée portrayed Saunders in the Arrowverse franchise while Isabela Merced portrayed her in the DC Universe (DCU) film Superman (2025). Some versions, however, are also composite versions of one another and feature different aspects of characterization not first present in comics.

== Publication history ==
=== Golden Age ===
Created by writer Gardner Fox and artist Dennis Neville, Shiera Sanders first appeared in Flash Comics #1 (January 1940), in the same 12-page story in which Fox and Neville introduced Hawkman. Shiera first appears as Hawkgirl in All Star Comics #5 (July 1941), in a costume created by Sheldon Moldoff, based on Neville's Hawkman costume.

=== Silver Age ===
With the fading popularity of superheroes during the late 1940s, the Hawkman feature ended in the last issue of Flash Comics in 1949. In 1956, DC Comics resurrected the Flash by revamping the character with a new identity and backstory. Following the success of the new Flash, DC Comics revamped Hawkman in a similar fashion with The Brave and the Bold #34 in 1961. The Silver Age versions of Hawkman and Hawkgirl became married Thanagarian police officers from the planet Thanagar who come to Earth to study police techniques. Silver Age Hawkgirl is introduced as Shayera Hol (phonetically identical to Shiera Hall), who appears in costume as of her first appearance. Although Silver Age Hawkman joins the Justice League in Justice League of America #31 in 1964, Silver Age Hawkgirl was not offered membership because Justice League rules only allowed for one new member to be admitted at a time. In 1981, Silver Age Hawkgirl changed her name to Hawkwoman in the Hawkman backup feature of World's Finest Comics #274.

With the establishment of DC's multiverse system, the Golden Age Hawkgirl was said to have lived on Earth-Two and the Silver Age Hawkgirl on Earth-One.

=== Post-Crisis and One Year Later ===
Following the events of DC's miniseries, Crisis on Infinite Earths, the histories of Earth-One, Two, Four, S, and X were merged into one single Earth with a consistent past, present, and future. As a result, both the Golden Age and the Silver Age versions of Hawkman and Hawkgirl live on the same Earth. Shortly after Crisis on Infinite Earths, DC decided that having the Justice Society on the same Earth as all of the other superheroes was redundant and most of the team, including Golden Age Hawkman and Hawkgirl were given a sendoff in the Last Days of the Justice Society one-shot. The Justice Society were trapped in another dimension, Limbo, where they would battle for all of eternity to prevent Ragnarök from occurring on the Earth.

Initially, the Silver Age Hawkman and Hawkwoman were kept in continuity unchanged after Crisis on Infinite Earths. However, DC reversed this decision and rebooted Hawkman continuity after the success of the Hawkworld miniseries. Originally, Hawkworld was a miniseries set in the past that revised the origins of Hawkman and Hawkwoman, but after the series became a success, DC Comics made Hawkworld an ongoing series set in the present, with both heroes only recently appearing on Earth after the events in the Invasion! miniseries, resulting in a complete reboot of Hawkman continuity. Several continuity errors regarding Hawkman and Hawkgirl's Justice League appearances then needed to be fixed, including their appearance in the Invasion! miniseries. All previous appearances by the Silver Age Hawkgirl in the Justice League were explained by the Golden Age Hawkgirl taking the Silver Age Hawkgirl's place. However, Hawkwoman continued to appear in some pre-Hawkworld Justice League adventures during the time Golden Age Hawkgirl was trapped in Limbo. To explain this continuity error, a new Hawkwoman, Sharon Parker, was created and retconned into the Justice League during the time Golden Age Hawkgirl was in Limbo.

After the Hawkworld reboot, Hawkgirl (Hawkwoman) was now Shayera Thal and not married to Katar Hol, instead merely his police partner. In post-Hawkworld continuity, Shayera adopts the name Hawkwoman from the very beginning of her costumed career and never uses the name Hawkgirl. The Golden Age Hawkgirl is eventually returned from Limbo, but during the Zero Hour miniseries she is merged with Katar Hol and Golden Age Hawkman into a new persona.

A new Hawkgirl was introduced as part of the 1999 revival of the JSA monthly title. The new Hawkgirl is Kendra Saunders, granddaughter of the Golden Age Hawkgirl's cousin, Speed Saunders. Hawkgirl would continue to appear regularly in the monthly JSA series and later in the Hawkman monthly. In 2006, the ongoing Hawkman monthly series was retitled Hawkgirl starting with issue #50 as part of the "One Year Later" jump forward; Kendra replaced Hawkman as the lead character. The Hawkgirl comic book series was finished with issue #66.

== Fictional character biographies ==
=== Shiera Sanders ===
The Golden Age Hawkgirl was Shiera Sanders Hall, the reincarnation of the Egyptian princess Chay-Ara, and partner of Carter Hall, the Golden Age Hawkman.

=== Shayera Thal ===
The Silver Age Hawkgirl, this version is an alien known as a Thanagarian, a long-lived human-like species with an affinity for Nth metal, which is used to created harness wings and other forms of weaponry. All continuities similarly portray her as a law enforcement officer on Thanagar trained and partnered with decorated officer, Katar Hol, whom she often disagrees with, and the pair later travel to Earth in order to learn different crime-fighting methods and becoming a superhero. While first using the "Hawkgirl" moniker, she later changes it to "Hawkwoman" due to the negative connotations associated with "girl" in Earth culture. She is often visually depicted as a redhead.

This version is a love interest of Katar Hol, with depictions varying in their marriage and progress in their relationship. Inspired by their appearances in the DCAU as love interests, she also has a close bond and history with John Stewart within recent comics although details and the extent is unknown.

=== Kendra Saunders ===
The modern incarnation of Hawkgirl; the current version is cast as a Hispanic-American (of Cuban origin). She is the granddaughter of adventurer Speed Saunders and cousin of the deceased Shiera Sanders, the first Hawkgirl. She is also the latest in a line of reincarnations involving Chay-Ara and Shrra, the latter original incarnation. Initially a leader of the Blackhawks ("Lady Blackhawk") battling threats from the Dark Multiverse, she eventually becomes the heroic Hawkgirl. Formerly, she was a film school student and the grand-niece of Shiera, whose soul would impart into her body when Kendra committed suicide, becoming a walk-in, and was trained by Speed to become the new Hawkgirl and inherited a preference for archaic weaponry and Egyptian history. Unlike other reincarnations, Kendra in both continuities is reluctant in pursuing Hawkman and is seeks independence from her reincarnation cycle.

== Powers and abilities ==
While each version of Hawkgirl differs in background and abilities, they all possess similar attributes; Due to the character's immortal lifetime and experience originating from their reincarnation cycle, all version of Hawkgirl are considered genius-level tacticians and possess a mastery of various fighting styles and weaponry of archaic design. They all commonly possess Nth metal harnesses, boots, and belt; this grants them a level of enhanced durability, strength, and flight. One instance with Kendra showcase enhanced healing, strength, vision and limited hover abilities when not wearing Nth metal, speculating that this was due to her prolonged exposure to the substance. Nth metal also regulates the body temperature of the wearer, preventing the need for heavy protective clothing while in high altitudes. It also has the property of radiating heat, which can be controlled to warm the wearer in colder climates.

== Other versions ==
=== Alternate universe versions ===
- In the alternate timeline of the Flashpoint event, Hawkgirl joined with the Amazons' Furies. Later, Hawkgirl is seen aiding Artemis in her attempt to kill the Resistance movement member, Lois Lane. Although Lois is rescued by Resistance member Penny Black using the smoke grenades, Penny is seriously wounded. Later, when the Furies attack Grifter and the Resistance, Hawkgirl pins Grifter down, but he pulls Hawkgirl down and then stabs her chest with a trench knife.
- In the DC Bombshells continuity set in World War II, Shiera is a technological genius and archaeologist who aids the Bombshells with her lover, Vixen. As Hawkgirl, she uses a jetpack rather than fly with wings, though when Cheetah forces her to build weapons out of ancient technology, she designs one with wings as well as a powerful mace. Shiera grew up in an orphanage in Mexico. From a young age she had a passion for history and ancient cultures, as well as the magnificent structures that they built. She became an archaeologist and her work caught the eye of Hans Garber. He informed her of the Zambesi Amulets and the power that they possessed.Intrigued, Shiera went to Zambesi to try to discover the secret of the amulets. There she met Queen Mari of Zambesi and the two of them fell in love. Shiera stayed in Zambesi with Mari and became her personal mechanic, building gadgets to assist Mari against her enemies.Hawkgirl discovered her true Thanagarian origins while fighting against Baroness Paula von Gunther. After connecting herself with an ancient mechanic god it was revealed to Shiera that her parents were members of the Wingmen of Thanagar, they sought to warn the humans of the intentions of Thanagar who wished to conquer the Earth; due to their actions they were captured and murdered.
- Shayera and Katar are featured in the Elseworlds three-part series Legend of the Hawkman (2000). The story takes place in the Earth-One timeline, some time after The Brave and the Bold #34. She is shown wanting to return home to Thanagar while Katar has grown accustomed to life on Earth. Although this mini-series was never labelled as an Elseworlds project when originally published, it is now accepted as being one, with this story clearly based on the Silver Age versions of Hawkman and Hawkgirl during the pre-Crisis on Infinite Earths era.
- Hawkgirl (Shayera Hol) and Hawkman feature in this mini-series set soon after their arrival on Earth as the duo faces an ancient menace with connections to their Thanagarian heritage. In the first chapter, "The Fallen One", Shayera has been anxious to return to Thanagar, but Katar feels a responsibility to the museum, especially its upcoming extraterrestrial treasure exhibit. While Katar has adopted Earth as his home Shayera doesn't feel like they belong there. In Tibet a group of archaeologists discovers a Thanagarian gateway carved into a cliff side, after being informed of this Hawkgirl and Hawkman travel to the location.Hawkman deciphers the writing on the gateway and it depicts the life of Thasaro, a Thanagarian child so evil that he threatened the existence of Thanagar's ancient gods. The ancient gods of Aerie condemned Thasaro into a mystic urn. Shayera's ancestor was entrusted with burying the urn so no one could release Thasaro. The archeologists and Katar want to examine the gateway but Shayera insists that the gateway be left alone. Hawkman and Shayera get into a fight until Shayera flies away heartbroken because Katar cares more about archeology than her feelings. Katar's fingerprints genetically open the gateway. Shayera hears an explosion and heads back to the site. Thasaro appears and makes the stone sentries throughout his chamber come to life. The sentries attack Hawkgirl but she manages to defeat his enforcers and finds Katar within Thasaro's grip. Thasaro then summons corpses like talons that rise up from the ground and pull Hawkgirl into a cavern beneath Thasaro's chamber. The talons maim Hawkgirl, but she manages to break away. Shayera's distress in the cavern awakens the spirit of her ancestor. Shayera's ancestor channels his aura into Shayera and gives her the edge she needs to subdue Thasaro. Thasaro is banished once again into the urn. The urn is then transported to the Midway City Museum so Katar and Shayera can safeguard it. Three months later Shayera is shown wanting to start a family, in the meantime Thanagarian zealots return to Earth to free the heinous fallen god. Thasaro's return brings chaos and devastation to Midway City, but using their Nth Metal weapons Hawkgirl and Hawkman are able to subdue him, banishing him to the fiery depths of Earth's Hell.
- In JLA: The Nail and JLA: Another Nail, Hawkgirl is a member of a Justice League, and remains so even after her husband's death by Amazo, although the team faces anti-alien prejudice and suspicion. She briefly contemplates abandoning Earth when anti-alien propaganda leads to a museum exhibit dedicated to Hawkman being vandalized, but when she returns to save two children from a burning building, her faith in humanity is restored when a group of civilians stand between her and government officials attempting to bring her in as an alien, the family she saved affirming that they still see Hawkman and her as heroes. In Another Nail, she appears to be close friends with Zatanna. She has forgiven Oliver Queen (in Amazo's body) after he admits feeling responsible for getting Katar killed, Queen believing that his attempts to prove himself caused Hawkman to put himself in danger to protect the more vulnerable Oliver. Her role as the sole Hawk with League membership is much like her animated counterpart in the Justice League animated series.
- In Batman: The Dark Knight Strikes Again, the Hawks tried to return to Thanagar to flee from Lex Luthor's military dictatorship, only to crash in the rain forests of Costa Rica. They decided to remain in hiding. They gave birth to a son and daughter, giving them natural wings. Katar and Shayera were killed in a military strike ordered by Lex Luthor, embracing each other in their final moments. The children were brought up in the jungle ever since. They were bent on revenge against Lex. As Hawkboy, the son ultimately kills Lex with Batman's permission, since he understands what he has been through.
- In Alex Ross's Silver Age-toned Justice, Hawkgirl is a member of the Justice League and co-director of the Midway City Museum, alongside her husband. With the entire JLA's secrets and weaknesses in hand, the Legion of Doom stages a simultaneous attack on nearly every member of the League. Hawkgirl and Hawkman are surprised by Toyman in the Midway City Museum, but manage to survive and decide to investigate his warehouse, where they are assaulted by his forces, and discover that he is making multiple Brainiac androids. She also appears in Secret Origins and Liberty and Justice.
- Kendra Saunders's version of Hawkgirl is featured in Gotham City Garage series. She is the youngest member of a very old team. It's revealed that Kendra's parents were killed during an alien invasion, she was later rescued by the Blackhawks and trained from a young age with captain Blackhawk. She is shown using the Lady Blackhawk costume and the alias Kendra Blackhawk. She resigns from the Blackhawks to help the Gotham City Garage against Lex Luthor's attacks.
- Hawkgirl was chosen for one of the seven features in the one-shot comic book. She lives in Chicago, working as a police detective. She is from Thanagar, her mace vibrates like a smartphone when Nth-Metal Thanagarian weapons are near and she has a secret Hawkroom. It is revealed that she did not leave Thanagar on good terms. After some time collecting Thanagarian weapons from crime scenes, she started suspecting something was wrong. This led to her fighting against an ancient Thanagarian that wanted her dead since she chose humans instead of Thanagarians.Erica Schultz, said she was inspired by the DC Animated Universe version of the character: "I've always been drawn to strong characters, but what really solidified my love for Shayera was the Justice League cartoon show."
- During a crossover with the cast of Scooby-Doo, the Silver Age version of Hawkgirl is featured alongside Hawkman in the Midway City Museum, working as curators. The heroes team-up with the characters from the animated series to discover who stole from their workplace. Later they uncover that Shadow Thief, Matter Master and Fadeaway Man were behind it. After a fight against the villains the heroes retrieve the stolen items.
- Hawkgirl appears as Shiera Hall in the continuation series to DC Comics Bombshells, Bombshells: United set in the United States in 1943. Shiera is shown in Green Light alongside her lover, Green Light. Hawkgirl is later featured fighting against the Apokolips invasion on Earth.
- Kendra Saunders's version of Hawkgirl makes an appearance in the intercompany crossover DC X Sonic the Hedgehog. Appearing in the third issue, she and Supergirl are subdued by Gorilla Grodd with his enhanced psychic powers, until they are aided by a Wonder Woman-suited Amy Rose. After Grodd and his Gorilla army are defeated, Hawkgirl nearly smashes the device enhancing Grodd's powers, until Amy stops her, revealing the source of the device is a Chaos Emerald.

== In other media ==
=== DC Animated Universe (DCAU) ===
The Shayera Hol version of Hawkgirl appears in series set in the DC Animated Universe (DCAU), voiced by Maria Canals-Barrera. This version is a member of the Thanagarian Armed Forces who wields an Nth Metal mace capable of disrupting magical and energy-based forces, is an expert hand-to-hand combatant, and came to Earth as an advance scout and spy for the Thanagarian military. Within this series' continuity and characterization, Shayera and the Thananigarians' wings were considered a part of their physiology and is a prominent love interest of John Stewart, both a departure from the comics.

=== DC Universe (DCU) ===
The Kendra Saunders incarnation of Hawkgirl appears in media set in the DC Universe, portrayed by Isabela Merced. Saunders made her first appearance in Superman. This version is a member of Maxwell Lord's "Justice Gang". Saunders later appears in the Peacemaker episode "The Ties That Grind", where she, Lord, and Guy Gardner interview Peacemaker for a position in the Justice Gang. Saunders will appear again in Man of Tomorrow.

=== Composite versions ===
The Kendra Saunders incarnation of Hawkgirl, with elements of Shiera Sanders Hall, appears in media set in the Arrowverse, portrayed by Ciara Renée.

=== Other appearances ===
==== Television ====
===== Animation =====
Hawkgirl as she appears in DC Super Hero Girls.

- The Shayera Hol incarnation of Hawkgirl appears in The All-New Super Friends Hour, voiced by Shannon Farnon.
- The Shayera Hol incarnation of Hawkgirl appears in Super Friends, voiced by Janet Waldo.
- The Shayera Hol incarnation of Hawkgirl appears in the Teen Titans Go! episode "Some of Their Parts".
- Shiera Sanders appears in the DC Super Hero Girls episode "#TheBirdAndTheBee", voiced by Stephanie Lemelin.
- The Shiera Sanders Hall incarnation of Hawkgirl appears in Harley Quinn, voiced by Quinta Brunson.

===== Live action =====
- The Shiera Sanders Hall incarnation of Hawkgirl appears in Smallville, portrayed by Sahar Biniaz.
- The Shiera Sanders Hall incarnation of Hawkgirl appears in Stargirl.

==== Film ====
- An evil, alternate universe incarnation of Hawkgirl named Angelique makes a non-speaking cameo appearance in Justice League: Crisis on Two Earths as a minor member of the Crime Syndicate. This version has no mask and wields a flaming sword.
- The Kendra Saunders incarnation of Hawkgirl appears in The Lego Batman Movie.
- The Shayera Hol incarnation of Hawkgirl appears in Teen Titans Go! To the Movies.
- The Shayera Hol incarnation of Hawkgirl was originally going to appear in Black Adam, but lead actor Dwayne Johnson later stated that she would not be in it.
- The Shayera Hol incarnation of Hawkgirl appears in Green Lantern: Beware My Power, voiced by Jamie Gray Hyder.
- The Shayera Hol incarnation of Hawkgirl appears in Justice League: Crisis on Infinite Earths, voiced again by Jamie Gray Hyder.

==== Video games ====
Hawkgirl in a promotional image for Lego Batman 3: Beyond Gotham.

- The Shayera Hol incarnation of Hawkgirl appears as a playable character in Justice League: Injustice for All.
- The Shayera Hol incarnation of Hawkgirl appears as a playable character in Justice League: Chronicles.
- The Kendra Saunders incarnation of Hawkgirl appears as a playable character in Justice League Heroes, voiced by Collette Whittaker.
- The Kendra Saunders incarnation of Hawkgirl appears in DC Universe Online, voiced by Lana Lesley.
- The Shayera Hol incarnation of Hawkgirl appears as a playable character in Lego Batman 2: DC Super Heroes, voiced by Kari Wahlgren.
- The Shiera Sanders Hall incarnation of Hawkgirl appears as a playable character in Injustice: Gods Among Us, voiced by Jennifer Hale.
- The Shiera Sanders Hall incarnation of Hawkgirl appears as a character summon in Scribblenauts Unmasked: A DC Comics Adventure.
- The Shayera Hol incarnation of Hawkgirl appears as a playable character in Lego Batman 3: Beyond Gotham, voiced again by Kari Wahlgren.
- The Kendra Saunders incarnation of Hawkgirl appears as a playable character in Infinite Crisis, voiced by Maria Canals-Barrera.
- The Kendra Saunders incarnation of Hawkgirl appears as a playable character in DC Legends.
- The Shayera Hol incarnation of Hawkgirl appears as a modifier in Injustice 2's "Multiverse" mode.
- The Shayera Hol incarnation of Hawkgirl appears as a playable character in Lego DC Super-Villains, voiced by Tiffany Smith.

==== Miscellaneous ====
- The DCAU incarnation of Shayera Hol / Hawkgirl appears in the tie-in comics Justice League Beyond, Justice League Adventures, and Justice League Unlimited.
- The Shayera Hol incarnation of Hawkgirl appears in All-New Batman: The Brave and the Bold.
- The Injustice incarnation of Shiera Sanders Hall / Hawkgirl appears in the Injustice: Gods Among Us prequel comic.
- The Kendra Saunders incarnation of Hawkgirl appears in DC Super Hero Girls (2015), voiced by Nika Futterman.
- The Kendra Saunders incarnation of Hawkgirl appears in DC Super Hero High, voiced again by Nika Futterman.
- The Kendra Saunders incarnation of Hawkgirl appears in the DC Super Hero Girls tie-in comic book.

== Reception ==
IGN's list of the "Top 25 Heroes of DC Comics" ranked Hawkgirl as #22. She was ranked 80th in Comics Buyer's Guide's "100 Sexiest Women in Comics" list.
