= Black Pirate =

Character from DC Comics

The Black Pirate
- Black Pirate in Sensation Comics #13, 1942. Art by Sheldon Moldoff.

Publication information
- Publisher: DC Comics
- First appearance: Action Comics #23 (April 1940)
- Created by: Sheldon Moldoff

In-story information
- Alter ego: Jon Valor
- Team affiliations: Five Warriors from Forever
- Abilities: Incorporeal ghost form

The Black Pirate (Jon Valor) is a character from DC Comics, created by Sheldon Moldoff. He first appeared in Action Comics #23 (April 1940). His ghost played an important role in James Robinson's 1990s Starman series.

== Fictional character biography ==
In the 16th century, Jon Valor was an English privateer working on a commission from the King, known for his strong moral code of justice.

Through his Black Pirate identity which enabled him to uphold justice on the wicked while protecting his loved ones from retribution, Jon had many adventures. He also met his lifelong adversary, the corrupt nobleman Don Carlos, who attempted to hire Jon to hunt down the Black Pirate for foiling his schemes. Jon's costume would change from its singular dark colors to a wild, more colorful one. He would even gain a sidekick in his adventures, his son Justin.

Don Carlos was King Philip of Spain's "lump of evil" son, who despised Jon for secretly marrying the woman that had been promised to him. The woman so despised Don Carlos that she happily gave up a chance to be part of the Royal Family. Don Carlos eventually resorted to kidnapping his father and imprisoning him in an iron mask, before announcing Philip's death so he could claim the throne. Black Pirate foiled this plan, and Don Carlos was accidentally killed during a battle in the throne room. King Philip did not mourn his evil son.

At some point Black Pirate was pulled from his own timeline by Epoch and brought to the year 3786. Along with four other time-displaced adventurers, these "Five Warriors from Forever" were manipulated into attacking the Eternity Brain. Before long the Five Warriors from Forever were captured and imprisoned inside of a dungeon. They were liberated thanks to the combined efforts of the Justice League of America and the Justice Society of America. After which, each of the displaced adventurers were sent back to their proper time eras.

Upon his return, he continued to fight alongside his son Justin. Many years would pass. The two separate and Jon eventually finds out his son had been murdered. Accused of the crime himself, he was hanged in the port that would eventually become Opal City. Before his death, he crafted a curse on the city that no person who died there (nor his old crew) would rest until Jon's name had been cleared. He remains in the city as a ghost.

His grandson Jack Valor took over the mantle of the Black Pirate. Although he lost his ship in a fight with Blackbeard, he was instrumental in helping a time-lost Batman return to his own era.

=== Starman ===
The Black Pirate appears as a mysterious shadowy form, helping the rookie hero Jack Knight fight a crime wave caused by the villain Mist. Jon helps Jack from the sidelines, slaying many of the Mist's soldiers. Eventually he contacts Jack directly and asks for his help, at the time also relating the circumstances of his death. Knight, of course, promises to prove the Black Pirate's innocence. Before he can fulfill this, the murderous dwarf Culp uses Jon's curse for his own evil purposes. Culp's plans fall apart when the legendary detective Hamilton Drew, working with Ralph and Sue Dibny proves Jon was innocent. Not only was Jon's soul freed, every soul that had ever died in Opal was freed also.

== In other media ==
- Jon Valor appears in the Legends of Tomorrow episode "Marooned", portrayed by Callum Keith Rennie. This version is a pirate captain.
- Black Pirate appears as a character summon in Scribblenauts Unmasked: A DC Comics Adventure.
- Black Pirate makes a cameo appearance in Superman (2025) via a mural.
