= Gardner Fox =

American comics writer (1911–1986)

- Portrait of Fox by Gil Kane, c. 1974
- Born: Gardner Francis Cooper Fox; May 20, 1911 New York City, U.S.
- Died: December 24, 1986 (aged 75) Princeton, New Jersey, U.S.
- Area: Writer
- Pseudonyms: Jefferson Cooper, Kevin Matthews, Kevin Mathews, James Kendricks, Jeffrey Gardner, Bart Sommers, Rod Gray, Simon Majors, Troy Conway, Glen Chase, Lynna Cooper
- Notable works: Golden Age: Sandman, Flash, Hawkman, Hawkgirl, Doctor Fate, Justice Society of America; Silver Age: Justice League of America, Atom, Hawkman, Hawkwoman, Zatanna, Batgirl, Red Tornado
- Awards: Alley Award: Best Script Writer (1962); Best Book-Length Story (1962, with Carmine Infantino); Favorite Novel (1963, with Mike Sekowsky); Best Novel (1965, with Murphy Anderson)
- Spouse: Lynda J. Negrini (m. 1937)
- Children: 2

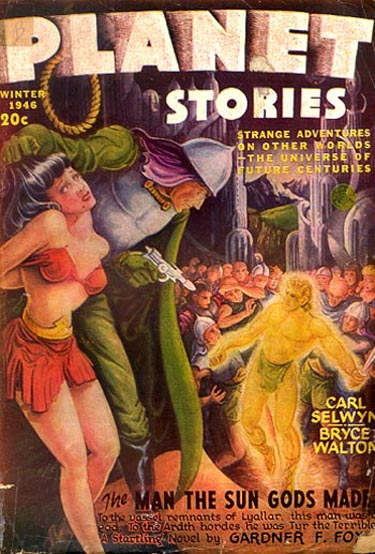
Fox's novella "The Man the Sun-Gods Made" was the cover story for the Winter 1946 issue of Planet Stories

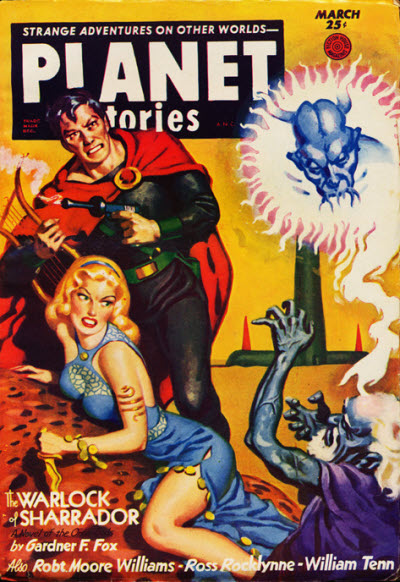
Fox's novella "The Warlock of Sharrador" was cover-featured on the March 1953 issue of Planet Stories

Gardner Francis Cooper Fox (Note: His name at birth was Gardner Cooper Fox. He usually known with the middle name Francis, which was his Catholic confirmation name, as well as the middle name of his father, and later the middle name of both his son and grandson. Many sources have referred to Fox as "Gardner Francis Cooper Fox".) (May 20, 1911 – December 24, 1986) was an American writer known best for creating numerous comic book characters for DC Comics. He is estimated to have written more than 4,000 comics stories, including 1,500 for DC Comics. Fox was also a science fiction author and wrote many novels and short stories.

Fox is known as the co-creator of DC Comics heroes Barbara Gordon, the original Flash, Hawkman, Hawkgirl, Doctor Fate, Zatanna and the original Sandman, and was the writer who first teamed several of those and other heroes as the Justice Society of America, and later recreated the team as the Justice League of America. Fox introduced the concept of the Multiverse to DC Comics in the 1961 story "Flash of Two Worlds!".

== Early life and career ==
Gardner Cooper Fox was born in Brooklyn, New York City, the son of Julia Veronica (Gardner) and Leon Francis Fox, an engineer. Unlike many of his contemporaries in the comic book field, such as Jack Kirby and Jerry Siegel, who came from poor backgrounds, Fox came from an affluent family from Long Island. His family was of Irish and English descent, with his first known American ancestor being the either Irish-or-English born Richard Fox arriving in Connecticut in 1635. Fox had a sister, Catherine (born 1916), known as "Kay".

Fox recalled being inspired at an early age by the great fantasy fiction writers. On or about his eleventh birthday, he was given The Gods of Mars and The Warlord of Mars by Edgar Rice Burroughs, books which "opened up a complete new world for me." He "read all of Burroughs, Harold Lamb, Talbot Mundy," maintaining copies "at home in my library" some 50 years later.

Fox received a law degree from St. John's College and was admitted to the New York bar in 1935. He practiced for about two years, but as the Great Depression continued he began writing for DC Comics editor Vin Sullivan. Debuting as a writer in the pages of Detective Comics, Fox "intermittently contributed tales to nearly every book in the DC lineup during the Golden Age." He was a frequent contributor of prose stories to the pulp science fiction magazines of the 1940s.

On November 14, 1937, Fox married Lynda J. Negrini. They had two children, Jeffrey Francis Fox (born April 9, 1940), and Lynda Anne Fox (born March 21, 1943).

A polymath, Fox included numerous real-world historical, scientific, and mythological references in his comic strips, once saying, "Knowledge is kind of a hobby with me". For instance, during a year's worth of Atom comic strip stories, Fox referred to the Hungarian Revolution of 1956, the space race, 18th-century England, miniature card painting, Norse mythology, and numismatics. He revealed in letters to fan Jerry Bails that he kept large troves of reference material, mentioning during 1971, "I maintain two file cabinets chock full of stuff. And the attic is crammed with books and magazines....Everything about science, nature, or unusual facts, I can go to my files or the at least 2,000 books that I have".

== Novels ==
Fox wrote both comic book scripts and prose fiction throughout his career. He began writing fiction for the pulp magazines and transferred to writing original paperback novels as the market shifted to that format in the 1950s.

During the mid-to-late 1940s, and into the 1950s, Fox wrote a number of short stories and text pieces for Weird Tales and Planet Stories, and was published in Amazing Stories and Marvel Science Stories. He wrote for a diverse range of pulp magazines, including Baseball Stories, Big Book Football Western, Fighting Western, Football Stories, Lariat Stories, Ace Sports, SuperScience, Northwest Romances, Thrilling Western, and Ranch Romances for a number of publishing companies.

His first novel, a historical romance entitled The Borgia Blade, was published by Belmont Books in 1953. He went on to write novels and short stories using a variety of male and female pseudonyms for a number of publishers, including Ace, Gold Medal, Tower Publications, Belmont Books, Dodd Mead, Hillman, Pocket Library, Pyramid Books and Signet Books.

Fox wrote a pair of sword and planet novels titled Warriors of Llarn (1964) and Thief of Llarn (1966).

From 1969 to 1970, Belmont Books published a series of sword and sorcery novels by Fox, featuring the barbarian character Kothar. These were Kothar: Barbarian Swordsman, Kothar of the Magic Sword, Kothar and the Demon Queen, Kothar and the Conjurer's Curse and finally Kothar and the Wizard Slayer. These were followed in 1976 by another series (published by Leisure Books) featuring the barbarian Kyrik: Kyrik: Warlock Warrior, Kyrik Fights the Demon World, Kyrik and the Wizard's Sword and Kyrik and the Lost Queen.

Kothar and the Conjurer's Curse was adapted by Marvel Comics as a six-part Conan story, loosely following Fox's plot but with Conan replacing Kothar, starting with Conan the Barbarian #46 ("The Curse of the Conjurer", Jan. 1975). The story was produced by scripter Roy Thomas and artists John Buscema, Joe Sinnott, Dan Adkins, and Dick Giordano.

== Comics ==
=== Golden Age ===
Fox's earliest stories for DC Comics featured the fictional district attorney Speed Saunders with art by Creig Flessel and later Fred Guardineer beginning at least with Detective Comics #4 (June 1937). Speed Saunders was initially credited to "E.C. Stoner," which Fox later claimed to be a pseudonym of him, and Fox has gone on record as claiming he created the character, "cashing in on my law school work". As the 1930s progressed, Fox added writing credits for Steve Malone and Bruce Nelson for Detective Comics to his workload, as well as Zatara for early issues of Action Comics.

During World War II, Fox assumed responsibility for a variety of characters and books of several of his colleagues who had been drafted. He worked for numerous companies including Marvel Comics' 1940s predecessor, Timely Comics; Vin Sullivan's Magazine Enterprises, Columbia Comics where he created Skyman; and at EC, where he served a brief stint as chief writer. With the waning popularity of superheroes, Fox contributed western, science fiction, humor, romance, and talking animal stories.

==== Batman ====
During July 1939, just two issues after the debut of the character Batman by artist Bob Kane and scripter Bill Finger, Fox wrote the first of his several tales for that character, introducing an early villain in the story "The Batman Meets Doctor Death". Alongside Kane and Finger, Fox contributed to the evolution of the character, including the character's first use of his utility belt, which "contain[ed] choking gas capsules," as well as writing the first usages of both the Batarang and the Batgyro, an autogyro, two issues later. These were the original bat-themed weapons and vehicles, a concept that would later be expanded on.

Fox returned to the Batman in 1964. (See below)

==== Sandman ====
During 1939, Fox and artist Bert Christman co-created the character of the Sandman, a gasmask-wearing costumed crime-fighter whose first appearance in Adventure Comics #40 (July 1939) was pre-empted by an appearance in New York World's Fair Comics.

==== The Flash ====
Fox is credited with writing the first three of six stories in the inaugural issue of Flash Comics (Jan. 1940), including the debut of the titular character, The Flash. With a hero described as a "modern-day Mercury", the title feature saw college student Jay Garrick imbued with superhuman speed after inhaling hard water vapors. The character went on to appear in a host of nineteen-forties comics, including All Star, Comic Cavalcade, The Big All-American Comic Book, Flash Comics and his own title, All-Flash, so named because, unlike Flash Comics, all the stories in it were about The Flash.

==== Hawkman ====
Describing the origins of Hawkman, Fox recalled, "I was faced with the problem of filling a new book that publisher Max Gaines was starting... As I sat by the window I noticed a bird collecting twigs for a nest. The bird would swoop down, pick up the twig, and fly away. I thought, 'Wouldn't it be great if the bird was a lawman and the twig a crook!'" The character bore a visual resemblance to the Hawkmen who had appeared in the Flash Gordon comic strip in the mid-1930s.

Debuting as the third story in Flash Comics #1 (Jan. 1940) — "Fox's imagination [transformed] that bird [into] the soaring, mysterious Hawkman." With art by Dennis Neville, the origin of the 'Winged Wonder' featured archaeologist and collector Carter Hall reliving his past life as Prince Khufu of ancient Egypt, creating a costume (powered by Nth metal), confronting the reincarnation of Hath-Set, his former nemesis, and meeting his reincarnated love interest, Shiera Saunders.

==== The Justice Society of America ====
Regularly writing more than six stories in five titles per month, every month throughout the early 1940s, Fox continued to create new features.

At the time, DC Comics consisted of two discrete sub-companies, Max Gaines' All-American Publications and Harry Donenfeld & Jack Liebowitz's National Periodical Publications. Though he continued to script for National/Detective Comics, Inc., Fox became the chief writer for All-American. While Fox's Dr. Fate (and other titles) was published by National; Sandman, Hawkman and the Flash were released by All-American. For Winter 1940, the third issue of All-American's All Star Comics debuted the Justice Society of America, the first superhero team in comics. Fox had worked on the Hawkman, Flash and Sandman features in All-Star for its first two issues (Summer and Autumn 1940), but from issue #3 (Winter), he assumed full writing duties for the issue, with all features by different artists working within the framing device wherein the characters were described as part of a "Justice Society".

In the pages of All-Star Comics #3, in collaboration with editor Sheldon Mayer and with artists including E. E. Hibbard, Fox created the first superhero team, the Justice Society of America. Each character – Dr. Fate, the Sandman, the Flash, and Hawkman were joined by Hour-Man, the Spectre, the Atom and Green Lantern – was introduced individually (by Johnny Thunder), and related a solo adventure, before being charged at the title's end with remaining a loose team by the Director of the FBI. During April 1941, Fox created the character of Starman with artist Jack Burnley in the pages of Adventure Comics #61 (April 1941), and the character would later join the JSA. Fox wrote the Justice Society's adventures from All Star Comics #3 until leaving the feature as of issue #34 (April–May 1947) with a story that introduced a new super-villain, the Wizard.

==== Non-DC work ====
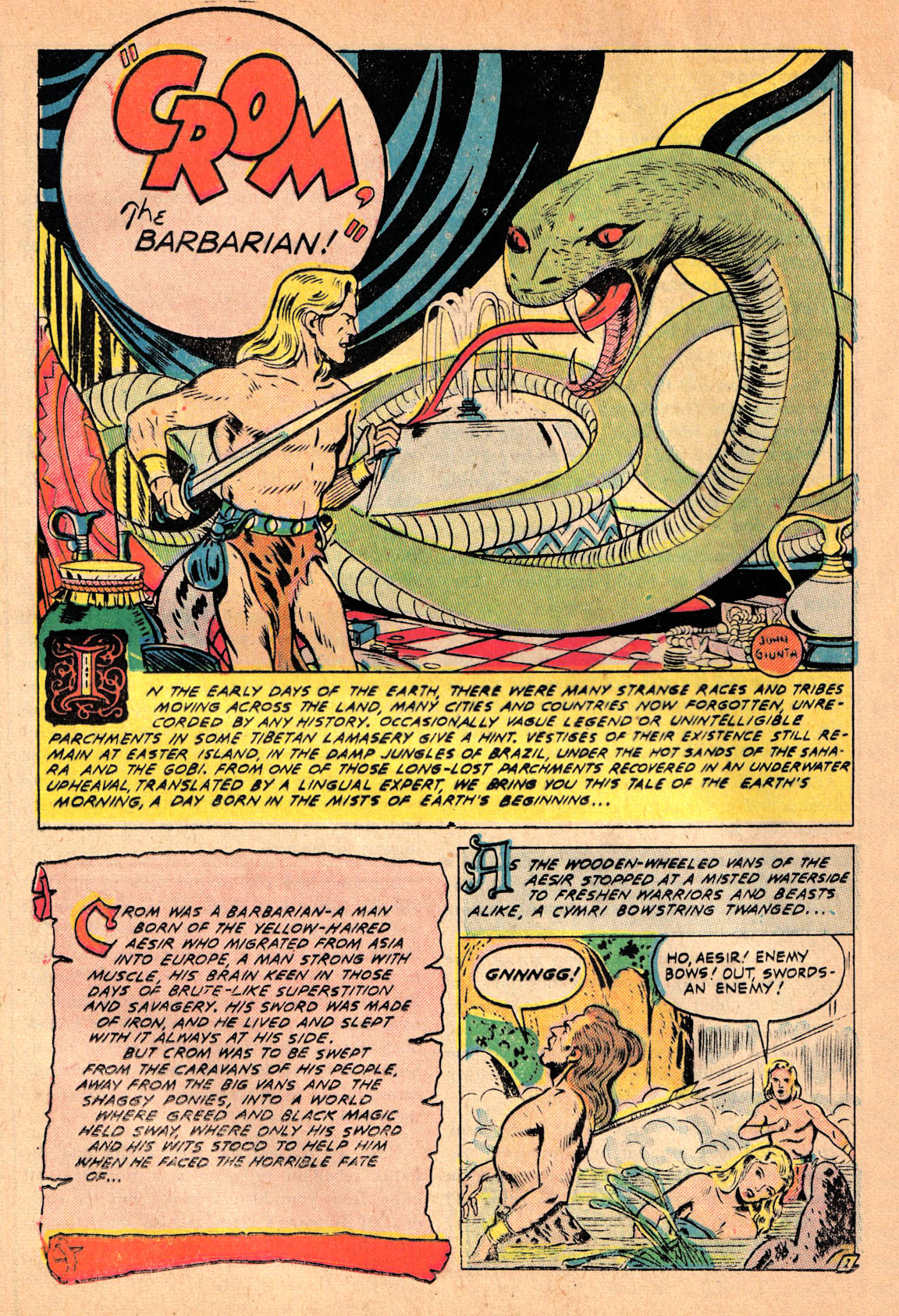
Crom, the Barbarian in Out of This World Adventures #1, June 1950, art by John Giunta.

Between 1940 and 1941, Fox wrote for the Columbia Comic Corporation, penning stories featuring characters including "Face," "Marvelo," "Rocky Ryan," "Skyman," and "Spymaster." For approximately three years (1947–1950), Fox wrote for EC Comics, including scripts and text pieces which appeared in the titles The Crypt of Terror, The Vault of Horror and Weird Fantasy, as well as in the lesser-known Gunfighter, Happy Houlihans, Moon Girl, Saddle Justice and the new trend title Valor, among others.

Towards the end of the decade, and the start of the 1950s, he worked for Magazine Enterprises on features including "The Durango Kid," the first Ghost Rider, "Red Hawk," "Straight Arrow" and "Tim Holt," in whose comic the Ghost Rider appeared. Fox wrote some of the required text pieces for Magazine Enterprises, which were required by the Post Office to qualify magazines and comics for cheaper postal rates.

Throughout the 1950s, Fox wrote stories for Avon Comics, most notably tales of "Crom the Barbarian", the first sword and sorcery comic series and of "Kenton of the Star Patrol."

=== Silver Age ===
During the early 1950s, Fox wrote Vigilante in Action Comics, as well as Western stories in the pages of Western Comics and science-fiction stories for DC's Mystery in Space and Strange Adventures. During 1953, he entered into correspondence with fan Jerry Bails, which initially emphasized Bails' fondness for the Justice Society and All-Star Comics, but ultimately became a friendship that not only influenced the beginning of comics' so-called "Silver Age", but also comics fandom, in which Bails had a major role.

During the mid-1950s, after Fredric Wertham's publication of Seduction of the Innocent and the United States Senate Subcommittee on Juvenile Delinquency hearings on the dangers of comic books, the content of comics was changed and became subject to censoring by the private Comics Code Authority. In partial response to this shift, DC editor Julius Schwartz began a widespread reinvention/revival of many earlier characters, and "Fox was one of the first writers... Schwartz called in to help". The Silver Age of Comic Books began in the pages of Showcase #4 (Oct. 1956) with a radically changed Flash character by writers Robert Kanigher and John Broome with penciler Carmine Infantino.

Fox scripted most of the Silver Age adventures of science-fiction hero Adam Strange, who debuted in the comic book Showcase #17 (Nov. 1958) with art by Mike Sekowsky. The Adam Strange stories were co-plotted by Fox and the character's creator, Julius Schwartz. With the "creative guidance" of Fox and Schwartz, "Hawkman and the Atom were given new costumes, new identities," and drew an audience of fans old and new. Fox penned the reinvention of the new Hawkman in The Brave and the Bold #34 (March 1961) and the Atom, who debuted in Showcase #34 (Sep–Oct. 1961) with art by Gil Kane.

==== Justice League of America ====
Another of Fox's major achievements was his revival of the concept of the Justice Society as the Justice League of America, debuting in the comic book The Brave and the Bold #28 (Feb.–Mar. 1960). Soon given their own title during Oct.–Nov. 1960, the Justice League would become the basis of the DC Universe. The supervillain Doctor Light first battled the team in issue #12 (June 1962). Justice League of America #21 and #22 (August–September 1963) featured the first team-up of the Justice League and the Justice Society of America as well as the first use of the term "Crisis" in reference to a crossover between characters. The next year's team-up with the Justice Society introduced the threat of the Crime Syndicate of America of Earth-Three. The character Zatanna, introduced by Fox and artist Murphy Anderson in Hawkman #4 (Nov. 1964), was the center of a plotline which ran through several DC titles and was resolved in Justice League of America #51 (Feb. 1967). Fox and Sekowsky were the creative team for the title's first eight years. Sekowsky's last issue was #63 (June 1968) and Fox departed with #65 (September 1968).

==== Multiverse ====
Fox's script for "Flash of Two Worlds!", from The Flash #123 (Sept. 1961), introduced the concept that the Golden Age heroes existed on a parallel Earth named Earth-Two, as the current Flash, Barry Allen, travels to the Earth of Jay Garrick, the 1940s Flash. This event heralded more generally the concept of the DC Comics Multiverse, a decades-long recurring theme of the DC Comics universe, allowing old and new heroes to co-exist and crossover.

Gardner Fox referenced himself in the story—in Barry Allen's world, the adventures of Jay Garrick's Flash appeared in comic books written by Fox. As Allen explains, "A writer named Gardner Fox wrote about your adventures -- which he claimed came to him in dreams! Obviously when Fox was asleep, his mind was 'tuned in' on your vibratory Earth! That explains how he 'dreamed up' the Flash!" At the end of the story, Allennsays, "I'm going to look up Gardner Fox, who wrote the original Flash stories, and tell it to him! He can write the whole thing up... in a comic book!"

==== Silver Age Batman ====
During 1964, Schwartz was made responsible for reviving the Batman titles and Fox returned to writing Batman stories. Obeying the Silver Age trends, he reintroduced characters including the Riddler and the Scarecrow. Fox's "Remarkable Ruse of the Riddler" with art by Sheldon Moldoff in Batman #171 (May 1965). Eighteen issues later, Fox and Moldoff similarly resuscitated and relocated Professor Jonathan Crane, launching the Earth-1 Scarecrow in "Fright of the Scarecrow", Batman #189 (Feb 1967). He and artist Carmine Infantino created the Blockbuster in Detective Comics #345 (Nov. 1965) and the Cluemaster in issue #351 (May 1966). Fox and Infantino introduced Barbara Gordon as a new version of Batgirl in a story titled "The Million Dollar Debut of Batgirl!" in Detective Comics #359 (January 1967). Fox's final Batman story, "Whatever Will Happen to Heiress Heloise?", was published in Detective Comics #384 (Feb. 1969).

=== Leaving DC ===
Fox stopped receiving work from DC during 1968, when the comics company refused to give health insurance and other benefits to its older creators. Fox, who had written a number of historical adventure, mystery and science fiction novels during the 1940s and the 1950s, began to produce novels full time, using his own name and several pseudonyms. He wrote a small number of comics during this period, but predominantly novels, writing more than 100 in genres such as science fiction, espionage, crime, fantasy, romance, western, and historical fiction.

Among his output was the modern novelisation of the Irwin Allen production of Jules Verne's Five Weeks in a Balloon, two books of the "Llarn" series; five books about the barbarian swordsman Kothar, starting during 1969 with the anthology Kothar—Barbarian Swordsman, and four books about the adventures of "Kyrik," starting with Warlock Warrior (1975).

For Tower Books, Belmont Books, and Belmont-Tower, he produced between thirteen and twenty-five "Lady from L.U.S.T." (League of Undercover Spies and Terrorists) novels between 1968 and 1975 using the name Rod Gray. With Rochelle Larkin and Leonard Levinson, Fox used the pen-name "Glen Chase" to write entries in the "Cherry Delight, The Sexecutioner" series.

=== Later comics work ===
During the early 1970s, Fox briefly worked for DC's rival publisher, Marvel Comics, writing scripts for The Tomb of Dracula, Red Wolf, and the "Doctor Strange" feature in Marvel Premiere. During 1971, Skywald Publications reprinted some of his earlier work in titles such as Demona, Nightmare, Red Mask and Zanagar, and Fox also found work with Warren Publications on Creepy and Eerie during the same period.

Towards the end of his life, during 1985, he worked briefly for Eclipse Comics including on the science fiction anthology Alien Encounters.

Fox died on December 24, 1986. He died at Princeton Medical Center in Princeton, New Jersey from pneumonia. He is interred in Holy Cross Burial Park and Mausoleum in East Brunswick, New Jersey, alongside his wife Lynda.

== Hobbies and achievements ==
During the course of his career, Fox can be definitely credited with about 1500 stories for DC Comics, making him the second most prolific DC creator (after Robert Kanigher) by a considerable margin over his nearest rival. In July 1971, Fox estimated he had written "[f]ifty million words" over the course of his career to date.

He was a member of a number of literary and genre organisations, including the Academy of Comic Book Arts, the Authors Guild, the Authors League of America, and the Science Fiction Writers of America. As a lawyer, he was a member of the legal fraternity Phi Delta Phi.

A sports fan, he liked both "the Mets and the Jets," and (during 1971) had "season tickets to the St. John's games." He enjoyed making and collecting miniature soldiers, focusing on ancient and medieval figures. A voracious reader, he stated, "I have two writers that I reread and reread. One that I'm sure nobody's every [sic] heard of is Jeffery Pond [sic]. I have every book he ever wrote. The other is the mystery writer John Dickson Carr, whose style I admire tremendously... and of course the old standbys – Merritt I always particularly liked – and Burroughs."

=== Awards ===
Fox won two 1962 Alley Awards – for Best Script Writer and for Best Book-Length Story ("The Planet that Came to a Standstill" in Mystery in Space #75), with penciler Carmine Infantino — as well as a 1963 Alley, for Favorite Novel ("Crisis on Earths 1 and 2" in Justice League of America #21–22, with penciler Mike Sekowsky), and the 1965 Alley for Best Novel ("Solomon Grundy Goes on a Rampage" in Showcase #55) with penciler Murphy Anderson.

He was honored at the New York Comic Art Convention during 1971. During 1982, at Skycon II, he was awarded the "Jules Verne Award for Life-time achievement."

== Legacy ==
During 1967, Fox's literary agent, August Lenniger, suggested that Fox donate his notes, correspondence, and samples of his work to the University of Oregon as a tax deduction. Fox donated over fourteen boxes of comics, books, scripts, plot ideas, and fan letters dating back to the 1940s. His records comprise the bulk of the university's Fox Collection.

The character Guy Gardner is named after Fox. During 1985, DC Comics named Fox as one of the honorees in the company's 50th anniversary publication Fifty Who Made DC Great.

During 1998, he was posthumously awarded a Harvey Award and entered into the Jack Kirby Hall of Fame; a year later, he was inducted into the Eisner Award Hall of Fame.

During 2007, Fox was one of the year's two recipients of the Bill Finger Award for Excellence in Comic Book Writing, given under the auspices of San Diego Comic-Con.

During 2002, the Cartoon Network broadcast an episode of the Justice League animated TV series titled "Legends", an homage to Fox's Justice Society and his annual Silver Age Justice Society/Justice League crossovers. The episode was dedicated to Fox. Additionally, in the episode titled "Paradise Lost", a TV news reporter refers to Hurricane Gardner.

In the sixth episode of the second season of Young Justice, during a disaster caused by Neutron that destroys part of Central City, the Flash directs a woman to a homeless shelter located between streets named Gardner and Fox.

== Bibliography ==
=== Comic books ===
==== DC Comics ====
- Action Comics #8–79 (Zatara); #134, 139–144 (Vigilante); #138 (Congo Bill) (1939–1950)
- Adventure Comics #35–67, 69–77, 81, 83–89 (1939–1944)
- All-American Western #105–106, 113, 115 (1949–1950)
- All-Flash #6–24, 28 (1942–1947)
- All-Flash Quarterly #1–5 (1941–1942)
- All Star Comics #1–34, 46, 50, 53 (1940–1950)
- All Star Western #62, 90–92, 94–95, 97–99, 107–119 (1951–1961)
- Atom #1–37 (1962–1968)
- Atom and Hawkman #40–41 (1968–1969)
- Batman #41, 165, 170–172, 174–175, 179, 181, 183–184, 186, 188–192, 194–197, 199, 201–202 (1947, 1964–1968)
- Big All-American Comic Book #1 (1944)
- Boy Commandos #36 (1949)
- The Brave and the Bold #28–30 (Justice League); #34–36, 42–44 (Hawkman); #45–49 (Strange Sports); #61–62 (Starman and Black Canary) (1960–1965)
- Comic Cavalcade #1–19 (1942–1947)
- Detective Comics #4–26, 37–43 (Speed Saunders); #29–34, 331, 333–340, 344–345, 347, 349, 351, 353, 356, 359-364, 366–369, 371, 373-377, 384 (Batman); #328–330, 332–339, 341–342, 345–358, 360–365, 367–383 (Elongated Man) (1937–1969)
- The Flash #117, 123, 129, 137–138, 140, 142–146, 150–152, 154, 159, 162, 164, 166–167, 170–171, 177 (1960–1968)
- Flash Comics #1–80 (1940–1947)
- Funny Stuff #22–27 (1947)
- Green Lantern #27 (1947)
- Green Lantern vol. 2 #16–17, 21–23, 25–29, 32–38, 41–44, 46, 48, 50, 57–58, 60, 62, 65, 67 (1962–1969)
- Hawkman #1–21 (1964–1967)
- Hopalong Cassidy #86, 89, 91–92, 112–113, 115, 117–121, 124 (1954–1957)
- Jimmy Wakely #1–3, 7–9, 11, 15 (1949–1952)
- Justice League of America #1–38, 40–47, 49–57, 59–65 (1960–1968)
- More Fun Comics #55–95 (Doctor Fate) (1940–1944)
- Mystery in Space #1–5, 7–15, 31–32, 36, 41, 43, 45–48, 50–91 (1951–1964)
- New York World's Fair Comics #1–2 (1939–1940)
- Sensation Comics #1–10, 109 (1942–1952)
- Showcase #15–16 (Space Ranger); #17–19 (Adam Strange); #34–36 (the Atom); #55–56 (Doctor Fate and Hourman); #60–61, 64 (Spectre) (1958–1966)
- Spectre #1–2, 6–7 (1967–1968)
- Strange Adventures #1–21, 23–26, 29—30, 35, 38, 50, 69, 71, 73–74, 78–81, 83–84, 86–97, 99, 101–107, 109–116, 118–159, 161, 163, 226 (1950–1970)
- Superboy #20 (1952)
- Western Comics #4, 19–21, 23–27, 31–37, 39–46, 56–85 (1948–1961)
- World's Best Comics #1 (1941)
- World's Finest Comics #2–8, 51–60, 62, 64 (1941–1953)

==== EC Comics ====
- Crime Patrol #7 (1948)
- Gunfighter 5–14 (1948–1950)
- Haunt of Fear #15–17 (1950)
- Haunt of Fear vol. 2 #4 (1950)
- International Comics #1–3 (1947)
- International Crime Patrol #6 (1948)
- Moon Girl #2–4 (1948)
- Vault of Horror #12–14 (1950)
- War Against Crime #4 (1948)
- Weird Fantasy #14–15 (1950)

==== Eclipse Comics ====
- Alien Encounters #4 (1986)

==== Marvel Comics ====
- Chamber of Chills #2–4 (1973)
- Creatures on the Loose #26–27 (1973–1974)
- Doc Savage #5–7 (1973)
- Dracula Lives! #4 (1974)
- Gunhawks #7 (1973)
- Journey into Mystery vol. 2 #4 (1973)
- Marvel Premiere #5–8 (Doctor Strange) (1972–1973)
- Marvel Spotlight #1 (Red Wolf) (1971)
- Monsters Unleashed #1 (1973)
- Red Wolf #2–8 (1972–1973)
- The Tomb of Dracula #5–6 (1972–1973)
- Vampire Tales #1–2 (1973)

==== Skywald ====
- Blazing Six Guns #2 (1971)
- Jungle Adventures #1 (1971)
- Nightmare #2–4 (1971)
- Psycho #1, 3, 7, 12, Annual #1 (1971–1973)
- Tender Love Stories #2 (1971)
- The Sundance Kid #2–3 (1971)

==== Tower Comics ====
- Undersea Agent #5–6 (1966–1967)

==== Warren ====
- Creepy #42, 58 (1971–1973)
- Eerie #27, 32–33, 35 (1970–1971)
- Vampirella #6, 8–9, 12 (1970–1971)

==== Crom the Barbarian ====
- Out of This World Adventures #1 - Crom the Barbarian (July 1950) with John Giunta [only as by Gardner Fox and John Giunta ]
- Out of This World Adventures #2 - The Spider God of Akka! (December 1950) with John Giunta [only as by Gardner Fox and John Giunta ]
- Strange Worlds #2 - The Giant From Beyond (April 1951) with John Giunta [only as by Gardner Fox and John Giunta ]

=== Fiction series ===
Alan Morgan

1. Warrior of Llarn (1964)
2. Thief of Llarn (1966)

Kothar

1. Kothar - Barbarian Swordsman (Belmont Books, 1969)
2. Kothar of the Magic Sword! (Belmont Books, 1969)
3. Kothar and the Demon Queen (Belmont Books, 1969)
4. Kothar and the Conjurer's Curse (Belmont Books, 1970)
5. Kothar and the Wizard Slayer (Belmont Books, 1970)

Kyrik

1. Kyrik: Warlock Warrior (Leisure Books, 1975)
2. Kyrik Fights the Demon World (Leisure Books, 1975)
3. Kyrik and the Wizard's Sword (Leisure Books, 1976)
4. Kyrik and the Lost Queen (Leisure Books, 1976)

=== Novels ===
- Five Weeks in a Balloon (1962)
- Escape Across the Cosmos (1964) only appeared as:
  - variant title: Escape Across the Cosmos (1964) [as by Gardner Fox ]
  - variant title: Titans of the Universe (1978) [as by Moonchild (inside Title Page) / James Harvey (front cover) under Manor Books imprint ]
- The Arsenal of Miracles (1964)
- The Hunter Out of Time (1965)
- Beyond the Black Enigma (1965) [only as by Bart Somers ]
- Abandon Galaxy! (1967) [only as by Bart Somers ]
- Laid in the Future (1969) [only as by Rod Gray ]
- The Druid Stone (1970) [only as by Simon Majors ]
- Conehead (1973)
- Omnibus
- The Arsenal of Miracles / Endless Shadow (1964) [O/2N] with John Brunner
- Fantasy Inverno 1993. Spade per la gloria (1993) [O]

=== Nonfiction ===
- Thun'da: King of the Congo (2010) with Frank Frazetta and Bob Powell [only as by Frank Frazetta and Gardner Fox and Bob Powell ]

=== Historic fiction ===
- One Sword for Love (1953)
- Iron Lover (1959)
- The Bastard of Orleans (1960)
- The Lion of Lucca (1966)
- The Bold Ones (1976)

=== Short fiction ===
- The Weirds of the Woodcarver (1944)
- The Last Monster (1945)
- Man nth (1945)
- Engines of the Gods (1946)
- Rain, Rain, Go Away! (1946)
- Heart of Light (1946)
- The Man the Sun-Gods Made (1946)
- Sword of the Seven Suns (1947)
- Vassals of the Lode-Star (1947)
- Werwile of the Crystal Crypt (1948)
- When Kohonnes Screamed (1948)
- The Rainbow Jade (1949)
- Temptress of the Time Flow (1950)
- Tonight the Stars Revolt! (1952)
- The Warlock of Sharrador (1953)
- The Holding of Kolymar (1972)
- Shadow of a Demon (1976)
- Beyond the Wizard Fog (1977)
- The Stolen Sacrifice (1978)
- The Thing From the Tomb (1979)
- The Eyes of Mavis Deval (1980)
- The Cube From Beyond (1980)
- The Cup of Golden Death (1980)
- Out of the Eons (1980)
- The Lure of the Golden Godling (1980)
- The Coming of the Sword (1981)
- The Return of Dargoll (1982)

=== Essays ===
- Letter (Fantastic Novels, September 1940): A. Merritt Books Scarce (1940)
- P.S.'s Feature Flash (1947)
- Letter (Planet Stories, Spring 1948): Fox Lets Fly (1947)
- Foreword (Kothar of the Magic Sword!) (1969)
- Introduction (Kyrik: Warlock Warrior) (1975)

== Notes ==
Preceded by n/a	All Star Comics writer 1940–1947	Succeeded by John Broome
Preceded by n/a	Justice League writer 1960–1968	Succeeded by Dennis O'Neil
Preceded by John Broome	The Flash writer 1960–1968	Succeeded by Cary Bates
Preceded by John Broome	Green Lantern vol. 2 writer 1962–1969	Succeeded by Dennis O'Neil
Preceded by France Herron	Batman writer 1964–1968	Succeeded by Frank Robbins
Preceded by Steve Brodie	Detective Comics writer 1964–1969	Succeeded by Robert Kanigher
Preceded by Archie Goodwin	Marvel Premiere writer 1972–1973	Succeeded by Steve Englehart
Preceded by Archie Goodwin	The Tomb of Dracula writer 1972–1973	Succeeded by Marv Wolfman
