= Speed Saunders =

- Speed Saunders, Hawkman (vol. 4) #1. Artwork by Rags Morales.

Publication information
- Publisher: DC Comics
- First appearance: Detective Comics #1 (March 1937)
- Created by: E.C. Stoner

In-story information
- Full name: Cyril "Speed" Saunders
- Team affiliations: All-Star Squadron
- Abilities: Good detective skills, good brawler

Cyril "Speed" Saunders is a DC Comics character, first appearing in Detective Comics as the first featured character in the anthology series around the Golden Age of Comic Books created by E.C. Stoner. He is depicted as an adventurer and detective during the 1930s and 1940s. He would then later be revived in a supporting character role as the retconned grandfather of the current Kendra Saunders, and first cousin to the original Hawkgirl, Shiera Sanders Hall.

== Publication history ==
Speed Saunders is the first featured character in the longest running series anthology American comic book series of DC Comics named Detective Comics in the first issue of the series starting in March 1937. He was regularly featured in the anthology series for about 50 issues. In 1999 James Robinson and David S. Goyer used the character in JSA Secret Files #1.

== Fictional character biography ==
Cyril started as a G-Man, working in the FBI's River Patrol Division. In addition to being a G-Man, he also seemed to be both an adventurer and detective depending on the needs of the story. He investigated murder cases, and also once fought with a mad scientist who'd transplanted a human brain into an ape.

Eventually, it was revealed that he was a private investigator and later a member of the OSS. During that time he meets Wesley Dodds and the two become lifelong friends (JSA Secret Files #1 1999).

In 1938 Saunders became involved in the Office of Strategic Services (OSS), participating in counterespionage operations throughout World War II(JSA Secret Files #1 1999).

In the modern era, Cyril finds his orphaned granddaughter, Kendra Saunders; he takes her in and begins training her in hand-to-hand combat and other skills. He knows that she has a great destiny as the next Hawkgirl.

Cyril joined his friend Wesley Dodds on a trip to China, Tibet, and the Himalayas. It is on Mt. Kailash that the two meet with the Gray Man. The two men receive the location of three babies, one of which is to receive the essence of Dr. Fate and so become the newest incarnation of that hero. Saunders leaves Wesley on that Mount to take the information to Alan Scott and the JSA, as well as to Sanderson Hawkins (JSA Secret Files #1 1999).

Once in China proper, Cyril also contacts his granddaughter Kendra and gives her information on one of the babies. He tells her to go to Vancouver, British Columbia and to protect that baby (JSA #2 1999).
