= Hawkman =

DC Comics superhero

- Hawkman and his various past reincarnations in the cover of Hawkman (2018) #7. Art by Bryan Hitch, Andrew Currie, and Jeremiah Skipper.

Publication information
- Publisher: DC Comics; All-American Publications
- First appearance: Carter Hall: Flash Comics #1 (January 1940); Katar Hol: The Brave and the Bold #34 (February–March 1961)

In-story information
- Alter ego: Carter Hall / Katar Hol List: Previous lifetime: Ktar Deathbringer Khufu Maat Kha-Tar Koenraad von Grimm Khater James Wright Hannibal Hawkes Brian Kent Carlo Salón Catar-Ol
- Species: Human (Carter); Thanagarian (Katar)
- Place of origin: Thanagar (Katar)
- Team affiliations: Justice League; Justice League International; Justice Society of America; Elite Hawkmen Force; Council of Immortals; All-Star Squadron
- Partnerships: Hawkgirl (various); The Atom (various); Doctor Fate (various); Hector Hall
- Notable aliases: Nighthawk; Avion; Gold Hawk; Airwing; Red Harrier; Titan Hawk
- Abilities: List: Human versions: Nth metal harness enhancements grants: Reincarnation; Superhuman strength; Superhuman stamina; Superhuman durability; Accelerated healing; Flight; Genius-level tactician; Skilled archaeologist; Expert hand-to-hand combatant and weaponry proficiency Thanigarian version: Same powers as human versions at greater levels to alien physiology; Superhuman senses; Longevity; Access to alien technology

Hawkman is the name of several superheroes appearing in American comic books published by DC Comics. Created by writer Gardner Fox and artist Dennis Neville, the original Hawkman first appeared in Flash Comics #1, published by All-American Publications in January 1940. While both notable versions of the characters were originally similar (with phonetically similar names) but different characters existing in parallel universes (Earth-One and Earth-Two respectively), the merging of both following Crisis on Infinite Earths led to numerous revisions to reconcile Hawkman's history and using each alter-ego's name interchangeably, marking Hawkman's reputation for a complex and confusing history.

Hawkman is consistently a hawk-themed, reincarnated warrior with access to the fictional Nth metal, granting him a host of powers, and a preference for archaic weaponry. He is often paired alongside fellow reincarnated warrior and paramour, Hawkgirl (or Hawkwoman). He is portrayed as either the human archaeologist Carter Hall whose re-discovery of Nth metal recalls his past reincarnations or as a decorated Thanagarian police officer Katar Hol who comes to Earth. Hawkman also has affiliation with several superhero teams such as the Justice Society of America and Justice League, often serving as team leader in the former. Ultimately, Hawkman's first incarnation was originally said to be Egyptian pharaoh Khufu but later stories reveal it to be Ktar Deathbringer, an alien murderer cursed to atone for his crimes by saving as many people as he killed, which transitioned him into a heroic figure. Due to the conditions of his curse, he reincarnates across space and time, allowing for multiple iterations to co-exist simultaneously at times.

The character has been adapted into other media numerous times, with significant appearances in Justice League Unlimited, which featured Hawkgirl as a main character, as well as several DC Universe Original Animated Movies. In live action, Hawkman first appeared onscreen in the two-part 1979 TV special Legends of the Superheroes, portrayed by Bill Nuckols. Hawkman was later portrayed by Michael Shanks in Smallville and by Falk Hentschel in The CW's Arrowverse series. He also appears in the DC Extended Universe film Black Adam (2022), portrayed by Aldis Hodge.

== Publication history ==
Hawkman first appeared in Flash Comics #1 (January 1940), and was a featured character in that title throughout the 1940s. This Hawkman was Carter Hall, a reincarnation of the ancient Egyptian prince Khufu. Hall discovered that the mysterious "ninth metal" (later changed simply to "Nth metal") could negate the effects of gravity and allow him to fly. He donned a costume with large wings to allow him to control his flight and became the crimefighter, Hawkman. He also had a companion hawk named Big Red that assisted him in fighting crime. An archaeologist by profession, Hall used ancient weapons from the museum that he curated.

The Golden Age Hawkman, from Flash Comics #71 (May 1946). Art by Joe Kubert

Hawkman was a charter member of the Justice Society of America, beginning with All Star Comics #3 (Winter 1940). In issue #8 he became the JSA's chairman, a position he held until the end of the JSA's run in All Star Comics in 1951. He was the only member of the JSA to appear in every adventure during the Golden Age of Comic Books. He romanced his reincarnated bride, Shiera Sanders, who became the crimefighter Hawkgirl. His first three adventures were drawn by creator Dennis Neville (who modeled Hawkman's costume on the hawkmen characters in the Flash Gordon comic strip by Alex Raymond), then by Sheldon Moldoff, and later by Joe Kubert, who slightly redesigned his mask in Flash Comics #85 (Jul 1947) and then, one year later, replaced the winged-hawk-like mask with a much simpler yellow cowl in Flash Comics #98 (Aug 1948).

Along with most other superheroes, Hawkman's Golden Age adventures came to an end when the industry turned away from the genre in the early 1950s. His last appearance was in All Star Comics #57 (1951).

Later in the decade, DC Comics, under editor Julius Schwartz, decided to revive a number of Golden Age superheroes in new incarnations, but retaining the same names and powers (except for The Atom, whose Golden Age incarnation was a diminutive pugilist that had no super-powers). Following the success of the Flash and Green Lantern, the name "Hawkman" was revived in The Brave and the Bold # 34 (Feb–Mar 1961), this time as an extraterrestrial police officer from the planet Thanagar, though his powers were largely the same. Created by Gardner Fox and Joe Kubert, this Hawkman named Katar Hol came to Earth with his wife Shayera in pursuit of a criminal, and decided to remain to study Earth police methods and fight crime. They adopted the names Carter and Shiera Hall and became curators of a museum in Midway City.

This Hawkman became a member of the Justice League of America in issue #31, where he often verbally sparred with the iconoclastic liberal hero Green Arrow. In the 1960s, it was revealed that the original Hawkman lived on the parallel world of Earth-Two, and that Katar Hol lived on Earth-One. The JLA and JSA had annual meetings throughout the 1960s and 1970s during which the two heroes often met.

The Silver Age Hawkman and Hawkgirl, from Hawkman #3 (August–September 1964). Art by Murphy Anderson.

The Silver Age Hawkman had his own series for a few years in the '60s, but with declining sales it ended at issue #27 and was then merged with that of the Atom. Atom and Hawkman lasted only another year or so before cancellation.

In the late 1970s in Showcase and World's Finest Comics, Thanagar went to war with the planet Rann, the adopted home of Adam Strange. This led to Hawkman and Hawkwoman severing ties with their homeworld, and later fighting The Shadow War of Hawkman (written by Jenny Blake Isabella) as the Thanagarians tried secretly to conquer the Earth.

The landmark 1985 series Crisis on Infinite Earths resulted in a massive revision of much of DC continuity and led to many characters being substantially rewritten. Hawkman was to suffer some of the greatest confusion as successive writers sought to explain his various appearances. In the revised timeline there was a single Earth which had witnessed the JSA in the 1940s and the JLA decades later. Successive revisions sought to establish exactly who had been Hawkman and Hawkwoman at different stages. For the first few years the pre-Crisis incarnations were still used, during which time they were prominent across the DC Universe and joined the latest incarnation of the Justice League.

DC decided to reboot Hawkman in a limited series (which later led to an ongoing series) titled Hawkworld originally by Timothy Truman, and later John Ostrander. In this series, Thanagar was a stratified society which conquered other worlds to enrich itself. Katar Hol was the son of a prominent official who rebelled against the status quo. He and his partner Shayera were sent to Earth and remained there for some years until Hol was apparently killed.

This created several continuity errors. Because the new Katar Hol had only just arrived on Earth, someone else had to have been Hawkman previously. In an attempt to resolve the problem it was established through retcons that the Golden Age Hawkman and Hawkgirl had continued to operate sporadically after their supposed retirement in 1951 through the 1990s, and that Nth metal originally came from Thanagar. The Halls, and not the Hols, joined the original incarnation of the JLA. Another Hawkman—Fel Andar, a Thanagarian agent—had been the one who joined the Justice League during the 1980s, pretending to be a hero but secretly spying on the League for his Thanagarian masters.

The Zero Hour miniseries muddied the waters further by merging the different Hawkmen into a "Hawkgod", who was the focus character in the third volume of the monthly Hawkman series. This version of Hawkman also had a small role in the alternate-future series Kingdom Come. After the end of this series, Hawkman's continuity was considered by DC to be too complicated, and he was absent from comics for several years.

In the late 1990s, the JSA series untangled Hawkman's continuity, establishing him as Carter Hall, a man who—along with Shiera—had been reincarnated dozens of times since his life in ancient Egypt, and whose powers were derived from Thanagarian Nth metal, which had been retroactively renamed from "ninth metal". The Katar Hol of the Hawkworld series had also come to Earth during the 1990s, as previously established. The 1980s Hawkman Fel Andar returned to Thanagar. The Hawkgod was later revealed to be an avatar of the Hawk aspect of the Red (from which Animal Man receives his powers) and only believed that he was Hawkman.

During the Identity Crisis miniseries, it was established that Hawkman (Carter Hall) had encouraged the mindwipe of Doctor Light and had actually been the one to initially suggest the idea. His role in the mindwipe was the basis for his enmity with Green Arrow, who felt that interfering with an individual's right to self-determination was beyond the moral right of any organization or government.

Subsequently, Hawkman was reincarnated and given a new series in 2002 entitled Hawkman vol. 4, written initially by James Robinson and Geoff Johns, with art by Rags Morales. Justin Gray and Jimmy Palmiotti took over writing duties during the third year of the series. In 2006, the series was retitled Hawkgirl with issue #50 and given a new creative team of Walt Simonson and Howard Chaykin. This series was cancelled with issue #66 in July 2007.

Hawkman was a major character in the Rann–Thanagar War miniseries, which stemmed from events in Countdown to Infinite Crisis. During this time, his continuity was further changed.

The character then received a new series spinning out of Dark Nights: Metal, helmed by Robert Venditti and Bryan Hitch.

== Fictional character biographies ==
=== Carter Hall ===
In the days of ancient Egypt, Prince Khufu is engaged in a feud with his rival, the Egyptian priest Hath-Set. The priest eventually captures both Khufu and his consort Chay-Ara, and kills them using a cursed dagger of Nth metal. Millennia later, in 1940, Khufu is reincarnated as American archaeologist Carter Hall, Chay-Ara as Shiera Sanders, and Hath-Set as scientist Anton Hastor. After touching the same Nth Metal dagger used to kill Khufu, Carter regains the memories of his former life and realizes Hastor is the reincarnation of his ancient foe. When Hastor kidnaps Shiera, using a magic spell to draw her to his lair, Hall uses his newly-regained memories to craft a gravity-defying belt using Nth metal and a winged costume to become Hawkman. Carter successfully rescues Shiera, Anton is killed by electrocution, and Carter and Sanders begin a romantic relationship.

Carter Hall and Shiera Sanders had a son together, named Hector Hall, who grew up to also have a superheroic identity as Silver Scarab and later adopted the mantle of Doctor Fate. Hector was a member of the superhero groups Infinity Inc. and the JSA, where he served alongside his father.

In the Final Crisis storyline, Hawkman and all of the other heroes fight to stop Darkseid from destroying the multiverse. In an attempt to save civilians, Checkmate creates a dimensional tunnel between universes. The tunnel begins breaking down and Lord Eye tries to close it, which will kill all the people who are still in the tunnel. Hawkman and Hawkgirl destroy Lord Eye, but are caught in the explosion. Hawkman is killed, while Hawkgirl survives but is hospitalized.

In Blackest Night, Kendra argues with Hawkman over whether to visit Jean Loring's grave with the Atom. As the two heroes quarrel, the reanimated corpses of Ralph and Sue Dibny, who are now members of the Black Lantern Corps, enter Hawkman's sanctuary. The Black Lanterns attack, Sue impaling Hawkgirl on a spear. Ralph taunts Hawkman, who is killed shortly afterwards. Both heroes are reanimated as Black Lanterns by Black Hand. In the final battle, Hawkman and Hawkgirl are resurrected by the white light. Kendra is revealed to be Shiera Hall, who remembers her past lives; she and Carter joyfully reunite.

In Brightest Day, Carter and Shiera follow Hath-Set, who has collected the bones from all of their past bodies, and created from them a portal to Hawkworld. While there, Carter is told by the Life Entity to "stop the Queen Khea" from leaving. While Hawkgirl is held by Hath-Set and Queen Khea, Hawkman and his group of the panthera attack the Manhawks homeworld. Hawkman hears Hawkgirl's cries and goes to rescue her. His arrival leads to a confrontation with Khea, who is Shiera Hall's mother. During the fight, Khea controls his Nth metal mace and armor, and Hawkman is tied together with Hawkgirl. Khea opens a gateway and enters a portal to the Zamaron homeworld. When she arrives on the Zamaron homeworld, Star Sapphire (Carol Ferris) frees them both to stop Khea's invasion. The two attack Khea as Hawkgirl wants to face her, but the Predator Entity bonds with the Queen.

Shiera and Carter separate both of them by stabbing Khea at the same time with weapons made of Zamaronian crystals. The bones of the past lives of Hawkman and Hawkgirl separate from the gateway. Animated by the violet light of love, the bones grab Khea and imprison her in the Zamaronian central power battery. Shiera and Carter, with both of their missions accomplished and their lives returned, are teleported back to St. Roch by Carol. Carter and Shiera are interrupted by Deadman, whose white ring tells them that they should lead separate lives. Carter refuses and the ring responds "So be it" and unleashes a blast of white light that kills Hawkman and Hawkgirl, turning them into dust. Deadman orders the ring to resurrect Hawkman and Hawkgirl but it refuses, saying Hawkman was brought back to life to overcome what held him back in his past life because he was essential in saving Earth.

When the "Dark Avatar" makes his presence known, Hawkman and Hawkgirl are revealed to be part of the Elementals, guardians of the forest located in Star City. They were transformed by the Entity to become the element of air and protect the Star City forest from the "Dark Avatar", which appears to be the Black Lantern version of the Swamp Thing. The Elementals are fused with Alec Holland's body. After the Dark Avatar is defeated, Hawkman discovers Sheira was not resurrected. Swamp Thing tells him Shiera is everywhere, revealing that she is still the elemental of air. Afterward, Hawkman returns home yelling "Shiera!"

In September 2011, The New 52 rebooted DC's continuity. In this new timeline, Hall tries to rid himself of his Hawkman armor by burning and burying it in a forest. However, the Nth metal suit re-bonds with him, preventing Hall from escaping his life as Hawkman.

The real Carter Hall returns as Hawkman to the DC Universe in Dark Days: The Forge. His origin as a pharaoh who is constantly being reincarnated is used for the character. Carter Hall is an archaeologist who is researching the origin of Nth metal and the powers it gives him. At some point, Carter encountered Barbatos and hit him with his mace. When the aged Batman and Superman arrive at the World Forge, they are met by a gigantic, hammer-wielding, hawk-like beast that proclaims it is Carter Hall, the dragon of Barbatos and Keeper of the Dark Forge, and that only endings are at the World Forge.

A new Hawkman series was announced in March 2017, as part of DC Rebirth; it was written by Robert Venditti and illustrated by Bryan Hitch. The book explores Carter Hall's experiences after the events of Dark Nights: Metal and his relationship to Hawkgirl.

The comic's first arc deals with Hall, who believes there are gaps in the memories of his past lives. He recovers a mystical artifact that allows him to unlock all of his memories. He becomes aware of multiple incarnations of himself, which include Katar Hol, and has a vision of a future Earth that has destroyed by gigantic, winged creatures that are later revealed to be spaceships known as the Deathbringers. Hall deduces his first human incarnation Prince Khufu had the same vision, resulting in a winged figure becoming an important symbol throughout his life.

=== Katar Hol ===
Katar Hol is an honored police officer on his homeworld of Thanagar. Along with his wife Shayera, they use anti-gravity belts and their wings to fly and fight criminals. These were the tools of an elite police unit tasked to track and apprehend the most dangerous criminals. The pair were sent to Earth in 1961 to capture the shapeshifting criminal Byth Rok. Following this mission, they elected to remain on Earth to work with authorities in the United States and learn human police methods. The two adopted covers as a pair of museum curators, Carter and Shiera Hall, and acted publicly as the second Hawkman and the second Hawkgirl (later Hawkwoman).

Although initially depicted as surviving the events of Crisis on Infinite Earths intact, Katar Hol was rebooted in the later miniseries Hawkworld, by Timothy Truman. A regular ongoing series of the same name followed, with writer John Ostrander joining Truman. Katar Hol, a young police officer on the planet Thanagar, rebels against the oppressive system of his planet and is sent into exile. He later escapes and uncovers a renegade police captain Byth Rok. As a result, he is reinstated into the force, given a new partner, Shayera Thal, and sent on a mission on Earth, where he is the third Hawkman.

In The New 52 continuity, Hawkman is Katar Hol, but uses the name Carter Hall.

== Powers and abilities ==
The bulk of the characters' powers originate from a Nth metal harness of Thanagarian origin (be it in his human or Thanagarian incarnation), granting him powers including super-strength, durability, enhanced vision, and accelerated healing. Nth metal also regulates the body temperature of the wearer, preventing the need for heavy protective clothing while in high altitudes. It also has the property of radiating heat, which can be controlled to warm the wearer in colder climates. The Golden Age Hawkman was also granted the ability to breathe underwater by the sea god Poseidon. He also discovered a hidden kingdom of sentient birds led by the old One-Eye, who taught him their language.

In addition to his powers, Hawkman is also an immortal warrior who is reincarnated throughout the ages, making him a warrior knowledgeable in many fighting styles and tactics, archaic weaponry, as well as numerous languages and cultures.

=== Katar Hol's powers and abilities ===
The Katar Hol version retains the same abilities and Nth metal enhancements as his human incarnation but possess extra powers inherent to the alien Thanagarian species such as a longer life-span and having greater base abilities associated with the Nth metal enhancements. Alongside it, Katar also had access to alien technology his human incarnation did not. During the Silver Age, his enhanced senses were comparable to a hawk and could converse with birds, though not command them in the same way that Aquaman could command sea creatures. Hawkman also wore special contact lenses that allowed him to detect beams and radiation.

== Other versions ==
- Hawkman appears in Just Imagine.... This version was a humanoid hawk who evolved from Robin.
- Hawkman's anti-matter Earth counterpart, Blood Eagle, appears in JLA #112, in which he is killed by the Crime Syndicate.

=== Past reincarnations ===
==== Nighthawk ====
Hannibal Hawkes, also known as Nighthawk, is a fictional cowboy in the first appearing in Western Comics #5. Originally a separate character, Nighthawk is retroactively made one of Hawkman's past lives from the 19th century. Created by Joe Millard and Charles Paris, his later adventures were handled by writers France Herron, Don Cameron, and Gardner Fox; and artists Gil Kane and Carmine Infantino. Nighthawk was originally depicted as dying during Crisis on Infinite Earths, although this has been retconned twice to fit in with the later revelation that he was a reincarnation of Prince Khufu — who would later be reincarnated as Carter Hall, the Golden Age Hawkman.

A modern-day version of the character appears in the Western-themed Robin (vol. 2) Annual #6, as a mercenary. He worked with Robin and Pow Wow Smith to track down the Trigger Twins.

Nighthawk appears in The New 52 issue All Star Western. Nighthawk's new origin is that he left home as a child and worked on a whaling boat. The captain, a former slave, became a second father to him and Nighthawk was there when the man died. This death inspired Nighthawk to fight for justice and for the oppressed. Nighthawk is teamed with Cinnamon once again. Nighthawk uses a special medallion he found at an Indian burial site which gives him enhanced strength and healing abilities.

=== Fel Andar ===
Fel Andar on the cover of Hawkworld (vol. 2) #22. Art by Graham Nolan.

Fel Andar is a Thanagarian agent who also uses the Hawkman codename. There are two different versions of the character: the pre-Hawkworld version (named Fell Andar), created by Jenny Blake Isabella and Richard Howell, and the post-Hawkworld version, created by John Ostrander and Graham Nolan. Fel Andar was created as a stand-in for Katar Hol in Katar's post-Crisis, pre-Hawkworld adventures, including his brief membership with Justice League International, after DC Comics decided to reboot Hawkman following publication of the 1989 Hawkworld miniseries,

First appearing in The Shadow War of Hawkman, Thanagarian agent Fell Andar led a team to Earth to steal the Hawks' technology. Thanagar has at this time become a fascist empire and was planning to take over the universe, starting with Earth. Since they lost their technology during the Equalizer plague, the Hawks were the only ones who possessed them as they were off-planet. Andar took control of the Hawks' spaceship. The Hawks manage to sabotage the ship and crashed. The Hawks battled Andar and emerged victorious, with Andar being killed in the battle.

Following Hawkworld, years before the events of Invasion!, Fel Andar, a Thanagarian spy operating on Earth, fell in love with an Earth woman, Sharon Parker. They married and Sharon gave birth to Ch'al Andar, also known as Charley Parker. When Charley is four years old, Andar is ordered to infiltrate the Justice League as the second Hawkman, "Carter Hall Jr.". Andar's superiors mindwipe Sharon, forcing her to take up a new identity as the second Hawkwoman, "Sharon Hall". Intending to gain his teammates' confidence, Andar claims to be the son of Carter Hall and Shiera Hall. Sharon learns of Andar's deception and informs Martian Manhunter and Maxwell Lord. Andar murders Sharon and escapes to Thanagar, and is later captured and sentenced to life imprisonment on Thanagar. During the Rann–Thanagar War, Andar is killed by Blackfire while attempting to reconcile with Charley and atone for his crimes.

== Awards ==
The series and character have won several awards over the years, including:

- 1961 Alley Award for Best Adventure Hero/Heroine Not in Own Book
- 1962 Alley Award for Best Hero
- 1963 Alley Award for Cross-Over of DC Heroes (The Brave and the Bold with the Flash)

== Reception ==
Hawkman was ranked as the 118th-greatest comic book character of all time by Wizard magazine. IGN also ranked Hawkman as the 56th-greatest comic book hero of all time, stating that the best part of Hawkman is his incredibly short fuse. IGN also described him as a complete and total badass.

== Collected editions ==
=== Carter Hall ===
Title	Material collected	Published date	ISBN
Golden Age Hawkman Archives Vol. 1	Material from Flash Comics #1–22	February 2006	978-1401204181
Golden Age Hawkman Archives Vol. 2	Material from Flash Comics #23-63, Big All-American Comic Book #1	June 2017	978-1401243845
Blackest Night: Rise of the Black Lanterns	Atom & Hawkman #46 and Power of Shazam! #48, Catwoman #83, Suicide Squad #67, Question #37, Phantom Stranger #42, Weird Western Takes #71, Starman #81	July 2010	978-1401228064
Hawkman Vol. 1: Endless Flight	Hawkman (vol. 4) #1–6, Hawkman Secret Files #1	April 2003	978-1563899522
Hawkman Vol. 2: Enemies & Allies	Hawkman (vol. 4) #7–12	March 2004	978-1401201968
Hawkman Vol. 3: Wings of Fury	Hawkman (vol. 4) #15–22	June 2005	978-1401204679
JSA: Black Reign	Hawkman (vol. 4) #23–25 and JSA #56–58	July 2005	978-1845760724
Hawkman Vol. 4 Rise of the Golden Eagle	Hawkman (vol. 4) #37–45	May 2006	978-1401210922
Hawkman by Geoff Johns Book One	Hawkman (vol. 4) #1–14, Hawkman Secret Files #1	June 2017	978-1401272906
Hawkman by Geoff Johns Book Two	Hawkman (vol. 4) #15–25 and JSA #56–58	April 2018	978-1401278342
The Hawkman Omnibus Vol. 1	Hawkman (vol. 4) #1–25, Hawkman Secret Files #1, JSA #56–58	January 2012	978-1401232221
Dark Nights: Metal: The Resistance	Hawkman: Found #1 and Teen Titans (vol. 6) #12, Nightwing (vol. 4) #29, Suicide Squad (vol. 5) #26, Green Arrow (vol. 6) #32, The Flash (vol. 5) #33, Hal Jordan and the Green Lantern Corps #32, Justice League (vol. 4) #32–33, Batman: Lost #1	July 2018	978-1401282981
Hawkman Vol. 1: Awakening	Hawkman (vol. 5) #1-6	June 2019	978-1401291440
Hawkman Vol. 2: Deathbringer	Hawkman (vol. 5) #7-12	December 2019	978-1401295585
Hawkman Vol. 3: Darkness Within	Hawkman (vol. 5) #13-19	September 2020	978-1779502490
Hawkman Vol. 4: Hawks Eternal	Hawkman (vol. 5) #20-29	February 2021	978-1779508065
Black Adam: The Justice Society Files	Black Adam - The Justice Society Files: Hawkman #1 and Black Adam - The Justice Society Files: Cyclone #1, Black Adam - The Justice Society Files: Atom Smasher #1, and Black Adam - The Justice Society Files: Dr. Fate #1	January 2023	978-1779517982

=== Katar Hol ===
Title	Material collected	Published date	ISBN
Hawkman Archives Vol. 1	The Brave and the Bold #34–36, 42–44; Mystery in Space #87–90	May 2000	978-1563896118
Hawkman Archives Vol. 2	Hawkman #1–8	April 2005	978-1401201616
Showcase Presents: Hawkman Vol. 1	The Brave and the Bold #34–36, 42–44, 51, The Atom #7, Mystery in Space #87–90; Hawkman #1–11	March 2007	978-1401212803
Showcase Presents: Hawkman Vol. 2	Hawkman #12–27, The Atom #31, The Atom and Hawkman #39–45, The Brave and the Bold #70	August 2008	978-1401218171
Hawkworld	Hawkworld #1-3	March 2014	978-1401243296
The Savage Hawkman Vol. 1: Darkness Rising	The Savage Hawkman #1–8	October 2012	978-1401237066
The Savage Hawkman Vol. 2: Wanted	The Savage Hawkman #0, #9–20	December 2013	978-1401240844
Convergence: Crisis Book One	Convergence: Hawkman #1-2 and Convergence: Batman and the Outsiders #1-2, Convergence: The Adventures of Superman #1-2, Convergence: Superboy and the Legion of Super-Heroes #1-2, Convergence: Green Lantern Corps #1-2	October 2015	978-1401258085
The Death of Hawkman	The Death of Hawkman #1-6	June 2017	978-1401268244

== In other media ==
=== Television ===
==== Animation ====
- The Katar Hol incarnation of Hawkman appears in The Superman/Aquaman Hour of Adventure, voiced by Vic Perrin.
- The Katar Hol incarnation of Hawkman appears in Super Friends, voiced by Jack Angel.
- Two characters based on Hawkman appear in media set in the DC Animated Universe (DCAU):
  - A character loosely based on the Katar Hol incarnation of Hawkman, Hro Talak, appears in the Justice League three-part episode "Starcrossed", voiced by Victor Rivers.
  - The Carter Hall incarnation of Hawkman, with elements of Katar Hol, appears in Justice League Unlimited, voiced by James Remar.
- The Katar Hol incarnation of Hawkman appears in The Batman, voiced by Robert Patrick.
- The Carter Hall incarnation of Hawkman appears in the Batman: The Brave and the Bold episode "The Golden Age of Justice!", voiced by William Katt.
- The Katar Hol incarnation of Hawkman appears in DC Super Friends: The Joker's Playhouse, voiced by David Kaye.
- The Katar Hol incarnation of Hawkman and Hro Talak appear in Young Justice, respectively voiced by James Arnold Taylor and Mark Rolston.
- An unidentified Hawkman appears in the Mad segment "That's What Super Friends Are For".
- The Katar Hol incarnation of Hawkman appears in DC Super Friends (2015), voiced by Sean Schemmel.
- The Katar Hol incarnation of Hawkman appears in Justice League Action, voiced by Troy Baker.
- The Katar Hol incarnation of Hawkman appears in Teen Titans Go!, voiced by Fred Tatasciore.
- The Carter Hall incarnation of Hawkman appears in DC Super Hero Girls, voiced by Phil LaMarr.
- Comic artist/writer Jack Kirby produced concept art for a planned Hawkman animated series.
- The Carter Hall incarnation of Hawkman makes cameo appearances in Harley Quinn, voiced by Tyler James Williams.

==== Live-action ====
- The Katar Hol incarnation of Hawkman appears in Legends of the Superheroes, portrayed by Bill Nuckols.
- The Carter Hall incarnation of Hawkman appears in Smallville, portrayed by Michael Shanks.
- The Carter Hall incarnation of Hawkman appears in media set in the Arrowverse, portrayed by Falk Hentschel.
- The Carter Hall incarnation of Hawkman appears in Stargirl.

=== Film ===
- The Carter Hall and Katar Hol incarnations of Hawkman make cameo appearances in Justice League: The New Frontier.
- The Carter Hall incarnation of Hawkman appears in Superman/Batman: Public Enemies, voiced by an uncredited Michael Gough.
- An alternate universe version of Hawkman called ManHawk makes a cameo appearance in Justice League: Crisis on Two Earths as a minor member of the Crime Syndicate.
- An unidentified Hawkman appears in Lego DC Comics Super Heroes: Justice League vs. Bizarro League, voiced by Phil Morris.
- A Hawkman film was in development by Warner Bros. in the early 2010s, but nothing came of it.
- The Katar Hol incarnation of Hawkman makes minor non-speaking appearances in the DC Animated Movie Universe (DCAMU) films Justice League Dark, The Death of Superman, Reign of the Supermen, and Justice League Dark: Apokolips War.
- The Katar Hol incarnation of Hawkman appears in Teen Titans Go! To the Movies.
- An Earth-2 version of Carter Hall / Hawkman appears in Justice Society: World War II, voiced by Omid Abtahi.
- The Katar Hol incarnation of Hawkman appears in Injustice.
- The Carter Hall incarnation of Hawkman appears in Teen Titans Go! & DC Super Hero Girls: Mayhem in the Multiverse, voiced again by Phil LaMarr.
- The Carter Hall incarnation of Hawkman appears in Black Adam, portrayed by Aldis Hodge.
- The Katar Hol incarnation of Hawkman makes a non-speaking appearance in Scooby-Doo! and Krypto, Too! as a member of the Justice League.
- The Katar Hol incarnation of Hawkman appears in Justice League: Crisis on Infinite Earths, voiced by Geoffrey Arend.

=== Video games ===
- The Carter Hall incarnation of Hawkman appears as a playable character in Batman: The Brave and the Bold – The Videogame, voiced again by William Katt.
- The Carter Hall incarnation of Hawkman appears as a character summon in Scribblenauts Unmasked: A DC Comics Adventure.
- The Carter Hall incarnation of Hawkman appears as a non-playable character in DC Universe Online, voiced by Jason Liebrecht.

=== Miscellaneous ===
- The Carter Hall incarnation of Hawkman appears in Justice League Adventures #20.
- The Katar Hol incarnation of Hawkman appears in All-New Batman: The Brave and the Bold #9.

== See also ==
- Birdman and the Galaxy Trio – 1967 TV cartoon series with a similar character
