= Dennis Neville =

American cartoonist

- Born: Dennis Neville c. 1920
- Areas: Penciller, Artist
- Pseudonym: Mark Howell
- Notable works: Hawkman; Hawkgirl; Hath-Set

Dennis Neville was an American comic book artist during the Golden Age of Comic Books, who co-created the DC Comics characters Hawkman, his lover Hawkgirl, and nemesis Hath-Set. Although not one of the big names in early comics, Neville did work on some important comics features from that era.

== Career ==
Neville worked for National Comics Publications (later known as DC Comics) in the 1930s and 1940s. He was one of Joe Shuster's early assistants on the Superman daily comic strip during that time, as well as on the detective series Slam Bradley.

Neville was the artist for the original versions of Hawkman, Hawkgirl, and Hath-Set for DC Comics when they all first appeared in Flash Comics #1 in 1940. Hawkman's first three adventures were drawn by Neville, modeled after the Hawkmen characters from the Flash Gordon comic strip by Alex Raymond. Neville soon left Hawkman, being replaced after three issues by Sheldon Moldoff and then later by Joe Kubert. (Kubert slightly redesigned Hawkman's mask in Flash Comics #85 [July 1947] and then, one year later, replaced the winged-hawk-like mask to a much simpler yellow cowl in Flash Comics #98 [Aug 1948].)

After leaving Hawkman, Neville returned to the Superman comic. Most of his comics work was done in the period 1940–1946; he returned to the industry in c. 1977 when he worked on the Rick O'Shay syndicated Western comics strip.
