= Sheldon Moldoff =

American cartoonist

- Moldoff at a convention in his later years.
- Born: Sheldon Douglas Moldoff; April 14, 1920 New York City, U.S.
- Died: February 29, 2012 (aged 91) Fort Lauderdale, Florida, U.S.
- Area: Penciller
- Pseudonym: Shelly
- Notable works: Batman, Scarecrow, Mr. Freeze
- Awards: Inkpot Award

Signature
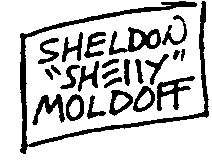

Sheldon "Shelly" Moldoff (/ˈmoʊldɒf/; April 14, 1920 – February 29, 2012) was an American comics artist best known for his early work on the DC Comics characters Hawkman and Hawkgirl, and as one of Bob Kane's primary "ghost artists" (uncredited collaborators) on the superhero Batman. He co-created the Batman supervillains Scarecrow, Mr. Freeze, the second Clayface, and Bat-Mite, as well as the original heroes Bat-Girl, Batwoman, and Ace the Bat-Hound. Moldoff is the sole creator of the Black Pirate.

== Biography ==
=== Early life and career ===
Born in Manhattan, New York City but mostly raised in The Bronx, he was introduced to cartooning by future comics artist Bernard Baily, who lived in the same apartment house as Moldoff. "I was drawing in chalk on the sidewalk—Popeye and Betty Boop and other popular cartoons of the day—and he came by and looked at it and said, 'Hey, do you want to learn how to draw cartoons?' I said, 'Yes!' He said, 'Come on, I'll show you how to draw.'" He was of Jewish background.

Moldoff sold his first cartoon drawing at age 17. "My first work in comic books was doing filler pages for Vincent Sullivan, who was the editor at National Periodicals", one of the three companies, with Detective Comics Inc. and All-American Publications, that eventually merged to form the modern-day DC Comics. Moldoff's debut was a sports filler that appeared on the inside back cover of the landmark Action Comics #1 (June 1938), the comic book that introduced Superman.

=== Golden Age ===
All-American Comics #16 (July 1940), cover art by Moldoff.

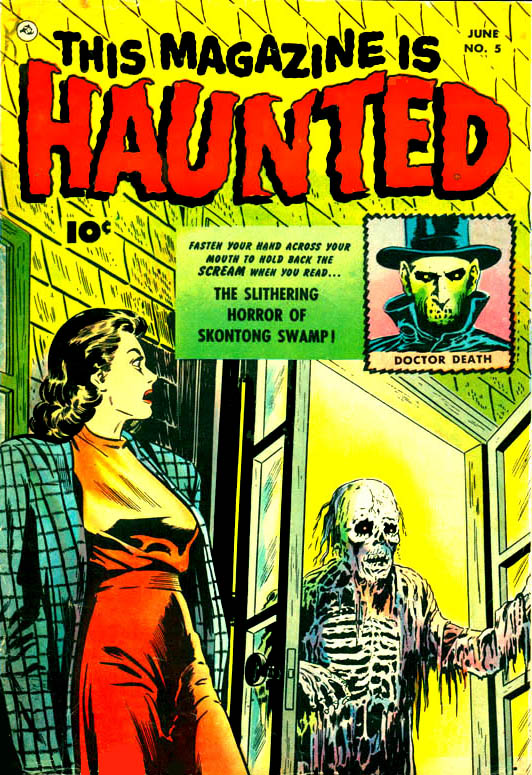
This Magazine is Haunted #5 (June 1952), Fawcett Comics

During the late-1930s and 1940s Golden Age of comic books, Moldoff became a prolific cover artist for the future DC Comics. His work includes the first cover of the Golden Age Green Lantern, on issue #16 (July 1940) of All-American's flagship title All-American Comics, featuring the debut of that character created by artist Martin Nodell. Moldoff created the character Black Pirate (Jon Valor) in Action Comics #23 (April 1940), and became one of the earliest artists for the character Hawkman (created by Gardner Fox and Dennis Neville, though sometimes misattributed to Moldoff). Moldoff drew the first image of the formerly civilian character Shiera Sanders in costume as Hawkgirl in All Star Comics #5, based on Neville's Hawkman costume design.

Beginning with Flash Comics #4 (April 1940), Moldoff became the regular Hawkman artist, following Neville's departure from the feature the issue before. He drew the Hawkman portions of the Justice Society of America stories published in All Star Comics as well. Moldoff recalled in 2000 that All-American publisher Max Gaines

...took a shine to me. ... He's the one who said, 'We're going to put you on "Hawkman", and do whatever you want with it. Do a good job; I know you can do it." And that was it! ... But when I looked at 'Hawkman' and read a couple of stories, I said to myself, 'This has to be done in a[n Alex] Raymond style.' I could just feel it.... I [had] saved [Raymond Flash Gordon] Sunday [comic strip] pages and the daily papers for years! ... [Gaines] liked my style; he liked the realism. We were competing with the newspapers. When he picked up the Sunday papers, he saw Flash Gordon, Prince Valiant, Terry and the Pirates. When he picked up a comic book, there was a tremendous difference in the quality of the art. And then, all of a sudden, he saw me—an 18-year-old coming around, and I'm almost a student of Raymond, and by God, the stuff looks good—it looks like Raymond! We all leaned on these guys to learn—and we were very lucky, because while we were learning, we were selling the product... I spent a lot of time on it. I had books on anatomy and shadows and wrinkles; I studied, and I worked very hard on it, and I think it showed.

Drafted into World War II military service in 1944, Moldoff returned to civilian life in 1946, drawing for Standard, Fawcett, Marvel and Max Gaines' EC Comics. For EC he drew Moon Girl, continuing with that character for Bill Gaines.

When superhero comics went out of fashion in the postwar era, Moldoff became an early pioneer in horror comics, packaging two such ready-to-print titles in 1948. He recalled in 2000 that, "I had shown This Magazine Is Haunted and Tales of the Supernatural to [Fawcett Comics'] Will Lieberson before I showed them to [EC Comics'] Bill Gaines, because I trusted Will Lieberson much more. He showed it to the big guys at Fawcett, and he said, 'Shelly, Fawcett doesn't want to get into horror now; they don't want to touch that'".

Moldoff then did approach Gaines with the package, signing a contract stipulating that he would be paid a royalty percentage if the books were successful. Several months later, when EC's Tales From the Crypt hit the newsstands, Gaines reneged on the deal, Moldoff recalled in 2000, with EC attorney Dave Alterbaum threatening to blacklist Moldoff if he took legal action. Afterward, said Moldoff, "Will Lieberson said, 'Let me bring it back to Fawcett again, and see if they'll take the title'. And so they did; they took This Magazine Is Haunted and Worlds of Fear and then Strange Suspense Stories. What they did was pay me $100 for the title, and give me as much work as I wanted, and I also did the covers. So that went on that way".

Moldoff, who received no royalty there, either, created the cadaverous host Doctor Death.

=== 1950s and 1960s ===
In 1953, Moldoff became one of the primary Batman ghost artists who, along with Win Mortimer and Dick Sprang, drew stories credited to Bob Kane, following Kane's style and under Kane's supervision. While Sprang ghosted as a DC employee, Moldoff, in a 1994 interview given while Kane was alive, described his own secret arrangement:

I worked for Bob Kane as a ghost from '53 to '67. DC didn't know that I was involved; that was the handshake agreement I had with Bob: 'You do the work don't say anything, Shelly, and you've got steady work'. No, he didn't pay great, but it was steady work, it was security. I knew that we had to do a minimum of 350 to 360 pages a year. Also, I was doing other work at the same time for [editors] Jack Schiff and Murray Boltinoff at DC. They didn't know I was working on Batman for Bob. ... So I was busy. Between the two, I never had a dull year, which is the compensation I got for being Bob's ghost, for keeping myself anonymous.

Moldoff and various writers created several new characters for the Batman franchise including the Batmen of All Nations, Ace the Bat-Hound, the original Batwoman, the Calendar Man, Mr. Freeze, Bat-Mite, the original Bat-Girl, and the second Clayface. Most of these characters were phased out in 1964 after a change in editors. Gardner Fox and Moldoff revived the Riddler in Batman #171 (May 1965). Moldoff designed the original Spellbinder. Moldoff got to pencil the first Poison Ivy story, but her design was already in place by her original creator Carmine Infantino.

Moldoff was let go by DC in 1967, along with many other prominent writers and artists who had made demands for health and retirement benefits. His final Batman stories were published in Batman #199 and Detective Comics #372 (both cover dated February 1968). He turned to animation, doing storyboards for such animated TV series as Courageous Cat and Minute Mouse, and wrote and drew promotional comic books given away to children at the Burger King, Big Boy, Red Lobster, and Captain D's restaurant and fast-food chains, as well as through the Atlanta Braves Major League Baseball team. When Moldoff illustrated a chapter of the Evan Dorkin project Superman and Batman: World's Funnest in 2000, it was his first work for DC Comics in over 30 years.

=== Later life ===
Moldoff retired to Florida with his wife Shirley. His family included sons Richard Moldoff and Kenneth Moldoff and daughter Ellen Moldoff Stein. He died at age 91 on February 29, 2012, following kidney failure. He was the last surviving contributor to Action Comics #1.

== Awards ==
Sheldon Moldoff received an Inkpot Award in 1991.

== Bibliography ==
=== DC Comics ===
- Action Comics #1–2, 5–8, 10, 12, 15–17, 20–36, 38–42 (1938–1941)
- Adventure Comics #313, 341–342 (inks over Curt Swan); #320–322, 334–337, 339 (inks over John Forte); #346 (inks over Jim Shooter) (Legion of Super-Heroes) (1963–1966)
- All-American Comics #27 (Green Lantern); #49 (Sargon the Sorcerer) (1941–1943)
- All-Flash #6 (1942)
- All Star Comics #1–23 (1940–1944)
- Batman #81–92, 94–175, 177–181, 183–184, 186, 188–192, 194–196, 199 (1954–1968)
- Blackhawk #110–112, 119, 121–122, 127, 133–135, 139–147, 149, 151–161, 163–164, 168–169, 171–173, 181, 184 (inks over Dick Dillin) (1957–1963)
- The Brave and the Bold #54 (Kid Flash/Aqualad/Robin) (inks over Bruno Premiani) (1964)
- Comic Cavalcade #1–3, 7, 14 (1942–1946)
- Detective Comics #199–207, 213–215, 218–219, 221, 223, 225, 227–228, 230–231, 233–239, 241–242, 244–247, 249–263, 266–295, 297–298, 300–307, 309–310, 312–317, 319–326, 328, 330, 332, 334, 336, 338, 340, 343, 344, 346, 348, 350, 353, 354–356, 358, 360, 362, 364–365, 368, 370, 372 (full art); #308 (inks over Dick Sprang) (1953–1968)
- Flash Comics #1–61 (1940–1945)
- Gang Busters #29, 53, 55, 58, 61, 65–66 (1952–1958)
- House of Mystery #60–62, 66–67, 80, 84 (full art); #2 (inks over Howard Purcell); #16 (inks over Leonard Starr); #34 (inks over Howard Sherman); #139 (inks over John Giunta) (1952–1963)
- House of Secrets #5–6, 15, 18, 21 (1957–1959)
- Mr. District Attorney #60–66 (full art); #18, 49 (inks over Howard Purcell); #35 (inks over Manny Stallman) (1950–1958)
- My Greatest Adventure #16, 68 (1957–1962)
- Mystery in Space #99 (inks over Howard Purcell) (1965)
- Sea Devils #16 (inks over Bruno Premiani); #16–33 (inks over Howard Purcell); #34–35 (inks over Chic Stone) (1964–1967)
- Sensation Comics #1–31 (Black Pirate); #34 (Sargon the Sorcerer) (1942–1944)
- Strange Adventures #187, 197 (inks over Howard Purcell) (1966–1967)
- Superboy #118, 121, 146, 148 (inks over Curt Swan) (1965–1968)
- Superman #145, 147–148, 188 (inks over Curt Swan) (1961–1966)
- Superman and Batman: World's Funnest #1 (among other artists) (2001)
- Superman's Girl Friend, Lois Lane #57 (inks over John Forte) (1965)
- Superman's Pal Jimmy Olsen #50, 85 (inks over Curt Swan); #87–88 (inks over John Forte) (1961–1965)
- Tales of the Unexpected #4–7, 10, 14, 16, 24, 48 (full art); #68 (inks over Bob Brown); #84 (inks over Howard Purcell) (1956–1964)
- Wonder Woman #1–6 (Wonder Women of History back-ups) (1942–1943)
- World's Finest Comics #68 (full art); 104, 106–108, 110–113, 115, 118, 123, 135 (inks over Dick Sprang); #122, 125–127, 129, 132, 139–140 (inks over Jim Mooney); #148–151, 157 (inks over Curt Swan) (1954–1966)

=== EC Comics ===
- Animal Fables #7 (1947)
- Crime Patrol #7 (1948)
- Gunfighter #5–6 (1948)
- The Happy Houlihans #1 (1947)
- International Comics #1–5 (1947)
- International Crime Patrol #6 (1948)
- Moon Girl #2–6 (1947–1949)
- Moon Girl and the Prince #1 (1947)
- Moon Girl Fights Crime #7–8 (1949)
- War Against Crime! #4 (1948)

=== Fawcett Comics ===
- Beware Terror Tales #3–8 (1952–1953)
- Marvel Family #25 (1948)

=== Marvel Comics ===
- Astonishing #33 (1954)
- Combat Casey #12 (1953)
- Journey into Unknown Worlds #17 (1953)
- Menace #10 (1954)
- Mystic #18, 29 (1953–1954)
- Strange Tales #20 (inks over Ed Moline) (1953)
- Uncanny Tales #23 (1954)

=== Quality Comics ===
- Hit Comics #25–30 (Kid Eternity) (1942–1943)

=== Tower Comics ===
- Undersea Agent #2 (inks over Ray Bailey) (1966)

Preceded by Dick Sprang	Detective Comics penciller 1953–1968	Succeeded by Chic Stone
Preceded by Dick Sprang	Batman penciller 1954–1968	Succeeded by Chic Stone
Preceded by Charles Paris	World's Finest Comics inker 1959–1966	Succeeded by George Klein
