= Flash Comics =

Comic book anthology

- Cover to Flash Comics #1 (Jan. 1940), art by Sheldon Moldoff.

Publication information
- Publisher: DC Comics
- Schedule: Monthly: #1–64, #70–104; Bimonthly: #65–69
- Format: Ongoing series
- Publication date: January 1940 – February 1949
- No. of issues: 104

Creative team
- Written by: Gardner Fox, Robert Kanigher
- Artist(s): Carmine Infantino, Joe Kubert, Harry Lampert, Dennis Neville

Flash Comics is a comics anthology published by All-American Publications and later by National Periodical Publications (DC Comics). The title had 104 issues published from January 1940 to February 1949. Despite the title, the anthology featured the adventures of multiple superheroes in addition to Jay Garrick, the original Flash. Characters introduced in the series include the Flash, Hawkman (Carter Hall), Hawkgirl and Black Canary.

== Publication history ==
The series debuted with a January 1940 cover date, while initially published on November 20, 1939. The first issue featured the first appearances of the Golden Age versions of the Flash, Hawkman, and Johnny Thunder. The Flash was later given a solo comic book series, All-Flash which ran for 32 issues between Summer 1941 to January 1948.

Artist Joe Kubert's long association with the Hawkman character began with the story "The Painter and the $100,000" in Flash Comics #62 (Feb. 1945). The Monocle was introduced in #64 as a new foe for Hawkman.

Carmine Infantino's first published work for DC was "The Black Canary", a six-page Johnny Thunder story in Flash Comics #86 (August 1947) that introduced the superheroine the Black Canary. Writer Robert Kanigher and Joe Kubert created the Thorn in issue #89 (November 1947).

Flash Comics was cancelled in 1949 with issue #104. The series' numbering would be continued by the first volume of The Flash series, which debuted during the Silver Age in 1959 and featured Barry Allen as the new Flash.

- Hawkman - issues #1 (January 1940) – #104 (February 1949)
- Johnny Thunder - issues #1 (January 1940) – #91 (January 1948)
- The Whip - issues #1 (January 1940) – #55 (July 1944)
- Cliff Cornwall - issues #1 (January 1940) – #19 (July 1941)
- Ghost Patrol - issues #29 (May 1942) – #104 (February 1949)
- Black Canary - issues #92 (February 1948) – #104 (February 1949)

== Collected editions ==
- Golden Age Flash Archives:
  - Vol. 1 collects the "Flash" stories from Flash Comics #1–17, 224 pages, September 1999, ISBN 978-1563895067
  - Vol. 2 collects the "Flash" stories from Flash Comics #18–24, 224 pages, February 2006, ISBN 978-1401207847
- The Flash Archives Vol. 1 includes the "Flash" story from Flash Comics #104, 224 pages, May 1998, ISBN 978-1563891397
- Golden Age Hawkman Archives Vol. 1 collects the "Hawkman" stories from Flash Comics #1–22, 224 pages, February 2006, ISBN 978-1401204181
- JSA All-Stars Archives Volume 1 includes the "Johnny Thunder" stories from Flash Comics #1–4, 256 pages, October 2007, ISBN 978-1401214722
- Black Canary Archives collects the "Johnny Thunder" stories from Flash Comics #86–91 and the "Black Canary" stories from Flash Comics #92–104, 224 pages, December 2000, ISBN 978-1563897344
