= List of animal superheroes =

Animal superheroes are fictional non-human animals that fit the narrative role of a hero in superhero fiction, typically possessing superpowers that they use to improve the world, protect the public, or fight crime.

== Comics ==
Name	Animal	Publisher	Description	Refs.
Ace the Bat-Hound	Dog	DC Comics	The pet dog and sidekick of Batman.	
Beasts of Burden	Dogs	Dark Horse Comics	A dog superhero team.	
Beppo	Monkey	DC Comics	A super-monkey from the planet Krypton.	
Captain Carrot	Rabbit	DC Comics	A rabbit that can gain powers similar to those of Superman.	
Ch'p	Squirrel	DC Comics	A squirrel-like alien and a member of the Green Lantern Corps.	
Comet	Horse	DC Comics	A sapient horse that was once an ancient Greek centaur.	
Cosmo the Spacedog	Dog	Marvel Comics	A telepathic Soviet space dog.	
Cutey Bunny	Rabbit	Joshua Quagmire	An anthropomorphic rabbit superheroine named Kelly O'Hare.	
Congorilla	Gorilla	DC Comics	A human that transformed into a super-powered gorilla.	
Detective Chimp	Chimpanzee	DC Comics	A highly intelligent chimpanzee detective.	
Devil Dinosaur	Dinosaur	Marvel Comics	A giant red theropod dinosaur.	
Dinkan	Mouse	Mangalam Publications	A superhero mouse from Kerala, India	
Dogpool	Dog	Marvel Comics	An alternate-universe version of Deadpool.	
Donatello	Turtle	Mirage Studios	One of the main characters of the Teenage Mutant Ninja Turtles franchise.	
Entoman	Duck	David Füleki	A vulgar, misanthropic German duck superhero.	
Gorilla-Man	Gorilla	Marvel Comics	A superhero gorilla.	
Hellcow	Cow	Marvel Comics	A cow that was bitten by Dracula, turning her into a vampiric superhero.	
Hit-Monkey	Japanese macaque	Marvel Comics	A Japanese monkey that works as an assassin.	
Hoppy the Marvel Bunny	Rabbit	Fawcett Comics	A rabbit with the powers of Captain Marvel.	
Howard the Duck	Duck	Marvel Comics	An anthropomorphic duck often appearing in satirical or humorous comics.	
Jeff the Land Shark	Land shark	Marvel Comics	The pet and sidekick of Gwenpool, Hawkeye, and Deadpool.	
Jennika	Turtle	IDW Publishing	A character from the Teenage Mutant Ninja Turtles franchise.	
Krypto	Dog	DC Comics	The pet dog and sidekick of Superman.	
Leonardo	Turtle	Mirage Studios	One of the main characters of the Teenage Mutant Ninja Turtles franchise.	
Lockheed	Dragon	Marvel Comics	The alien dragon companion of Kitty Pryde.	
Lockjaw	Dog	Marvel Comics	An Inhuman bulldog with teleportation powers.	
Michaelangelo	Turtle	Mirage Studios	One of the main characters of the Teenage Mutant Ninja Turtles franchise.	
Miyamoto Usagi	Rabbit	Dark Horse Comics	A rabbit rōnin.	
Old Lace	Dinosaur	Marvel Comics	A genetically-engineered Deinonychus and partner of Gertrude Yorkes.	
Paperinik	Duck	Arnoldo Mondadori Editore	The superhero alter ego of Donald Duck.	
Raphael	Turtle	Mirage Studios	One of the main characters of the Teenage Mutant Ninja Turtles franchise.	
Rex the Wonder Dog	Dog	DC Comics	A superhero White Shepherd dog with various superpowers.	
Rocket Raccoon	Raccoon	Marvel Comics	A superhero that is a member of the Guardians of the Galaxy.	
Solovar	Gorilla	DC Comics	A gorilla supporting character of the Flash.	
Spider-Ham	Pig	Marvel Comics	An alternate-universe version of Spider-Man.	
Streaky the Supercat	Cat	DC Comics	The pet cat of Supergirl.	
Super Duck	Duck	Archie Comics	A comedic superhero duck.	
Super Rabbit	Rabbit	Timely Comics	A rabbit with a magic ring that grants him invulnerability.	
Super-Turtle	Turtle	DC Comics	A superhero turtle inspired by Superman.	
Tawky Tawny	Tiger	Fawcett Comics	An anthropomorphic tiger and supporting character of Captain Marvel.	
Terrific Whatzit	Turtle	DC Comics	A turtle with powers similar to those of the Flash.	
Thunderbunny	Rabbit	Charlton Comics	A boy named Bobby Caswell that can transform into a superhero bunny.	
Topo	Octopus	DC Comics	The octopus sidekick of Aquaman.	
Zabu	Smilodon	Marvel Comics	A saber-toothed cat from the Savage Land and the partner of Ka-Zar.	

== Animated films ==
Name	Animal	Work	Description	Refs.
Charlie the Wonderdog	Dog	Charlie the Wonderdog	A dog superhero.	
Combat Wombat	Wombat	Combat Wombat	A female superhero wombat whose real name is Maggie Diggins.	
Po	Panda	Kung Fu Panda	A martial artist panda that is the prophesized Dragon Warrior.	
StarDog	Dog	StarDog and TurboCat	A superpowered dog.	
TurboCat	Cat	StarDog and TurboCat	A vigilante cat.	

== Animated television series ==
Name	Animal	Work	Description	Refs.
Darkwing Duck	Duck	Darkwing Duck	A superhero duck named Drake Mallard.	
Duck Dodgers	Duck	Looney Tunes	A science fiction superhero alter-ego of Daffy Duck.	
Dynomutt	Robotic dog	Dynomutt, Dog Wonder	The robotic dog sidekick of the Blue Falcon.	
Gleek	Monkey	The All-New Super Friends Hour	A blue, monkey-like alien and a member of the Super Friends.	
Hong Kong Phooey	Dog	Hong Kong Phooey	A dog superhero that fights crime with kung fu.	
Mighty Mouse	Mouse	Mighty Mouse series	A superhero mouse inspired by Superman.	
Perry the Platypus	Platypus	Phineas and Ferb	A pet platypus that has a secret agent alter ego.	
Rufus	Naked mole rat	Kim Possible	The sidekick of Kim Possible and Ron Stoppable.	
Underdog	Dog	Underdog	A superhero dog.	
Wonder Dog	Dog	Super Friends	The dog sidekick of superheroes Wendy and Marvin.	

== Live action ==
Name	Animal	Work	Description	Refs.
Alligator Loki	Alligator	Marvel Cinematic Universe	An alternate universe version of Loki.	
Godzilla	Dinosaur	Godzilla	A radioactive dinosaur kaiju.	
Rocket	Raccoon	Marvel Cinematic Universe	The film version of Rocket Raccoon.	
Venus	Turtle	Ninja Turtles: The Next Mutation	A character from the Teenage Mutant Ninja Turtles franchise.	

== Literature ==
Name	Animal	Work	Description	Refs.
Ulysses	Squirrel	Flora & Ulysses	A superhero squirrel that is friends with a girl named Flora.	

== Video games ==
Name	Animal	Work	Description	Refs.
Knuckles the Echidna	Echidna	Sonic the Hedgehog	A red echidna and friend of Sonic.	
Sonic the Hedgehog	Hedgehog	Sonic the Hedgehog	A blue hedgehog with superhuman speed.	
Shadow the Hedgehog	Hedgehog	Sonic the Hedgehog	A hedgehog antihero and rival of Sonic.	
Tails	Fox	Sonic the Hedgehog	A two-tailed fox and sidekick of Sonic.	
