= Comet (DC Comics) =

DC Comics character

Comet the Super-Horse
- Comet as depicted in Action Comics #292 (September 1962). Art by Jim Mooney.

Publication information
- Publisher: DC Comics
- First appearance: Adventure Comics #293 (February 1962)
- Created by: Jerry Siegel; Curt Swan

In-story information
- Alter ego: Biron
- Species: Sentient horse (former centaur)
- Team affiliations: Legion of Super-Pets
- Notable aliases: "Bronco" Bill Starr
- Abilities: Flight; Super strength; Super speed; Telepathy

Comet is the name of two comic book superheroes owned by DC Comics whose adventures have been published by that same company. The first character is Biron, a sapient horse with magical powers who was once a centaur in ancient Greece. The second character is a shapeshifter with three forms (male, female, and winged centaur). Both characters are connected to the Superman family of titles.

Comet first appeared in the story "The Legion of Super-Traitors!", published in Adventure Comics #293 (February 1962) during the period known as the Silver Age of Comics. This story introduced the Legion of Super-Pets, bringing together several previously established super animals. Krypto the Super-Dog came from Superman's past, Streaky the Supercat and Beppo the Super-Monkey from Superman's present—and Comet was presented as a super-pet who came from the future. The horse was properly introduced seven months later, when Comet met Supergirl in Action Comics #293 (September 1962).

Following Crisis on Infinite Earths (1985), which destroyed the universe and rebooted DC's continuity, the original Comet was no longer considered canon. However, Comet returned to continuity in the limited series Supergirl: Woman of Tomorrow (2021–2022), where he sacrificed himself to save Supergirl.

== Pre-Crisis Comet ==
Comet the Super-Horse was introduced in the Superboy story in Adventure Comics #293 in February 1962, then appeared regularly with Supergirl beginning in Action Comics #292 in September 1962.

Comet was one of a series of super-powered animals, including Streaky the cat and Beppo the monkey, that were popular in DC's comics of the 1960s. Comet was Supergirl's pet horse and, while in his human form as Bill Starr, her brief boyfriend. Comet also had a brief romance with Lois Lane in her comic book.

As he described to her telepathically, he was originally a centaur in ancient Greece named Biron. The witch Circe gave him a potion to transform him into a human after he prevented an evil sorcerer from poisoning her water, but accidentally transformed him into a horse. Unable to reverse the spell, Circe instead gave Biron superpowers, including immortality. The sorcerer asked his teacher to help him against Biron and they were able to imprison him on an asteroid in the constellation of Sagittarius, which he had been born under. However, when Supergirl's rocket passed, it broke the force field, enabling him to escape. Later, after meeting Supergirl, the two travel to the planet Zerox, where Comet gains the ability to transform into a human when a specific comet is close to Earth. As a human, he adopts the identity of "Bronco" Bill Starr, a rodeo trick-rider.

Comet made sporadic appearances in comic stories through the 1960s and joins the Legion of Super-Pets, a group consisting of the aforementioned super-powered animals.

Post-Crisis, Comet did not appear for many years until Final Crisis: Legion of 3 Worlds #1, where he appeared on display in a museum that Superboy-Prime visits. Comet fully returned to continuity in the miniseries Supergirl: Woman of Tomorrow.

=== Powers and abilities ===
Comet possesses similar powers to those of a Kryptonian, as well as telepathy. Due to not being a Kryptonian, he is unaffected by kryptonite and doesn't lose his powers under red sun radiation.

== Post-Crisis Comet ==
Comet
- Comet as depicted in Supergirl #50 (November 2000). Art by Leonard Kirk (penciler), Robin Riggs (inker), and Gene D'Angelo (colorist).

Publication information
- Publisher: DC Comics
- First appearance: Supergirl #14 (October 1997)
- Created by: Peter David; Leonard Kirk

In-story information
- Alter ego: Andrew Jones/Andrea Martinez
- Team affiliations: The Stable
- Notable aliases: Andy Jones, Earth-Born Angel of Love
- Abilities: Flight; Superhuman speed Ice vision Psionic love manipulation

A very different Comet was introduced in Supergirl #14 (October 1997). This version was originally introduced as a hero with flight and cold-generation powers. Comet's appearance was unclear, as when using his powers he was surrounded by an aura of cold that made him resemble an actual comet. Comet is later revealed to be Andrea Martinez, a gay stand-up comic, who can willingly transform between her human and super-powered forms. Martinez's powered form is male.

Comet's male form was originally Andrew Jones, a jockey who was trampled by horses and "rebuilt" by an organization called the Stable as a superhuman with equine DNA. He rebelled against the organization and began operating as a superhero. On one of his first missions, Jones attempts to save a despairing Andrea Martinez from an avalanche, but they are both killed. Jones and Martinez are resurrected and fused into the Angel of Love, who is exploited by Blithe, the Angel of Light, into battling Supergirl. Supergirl convinces Comet to fully embrace their angel powers, assuming the form of a winged centaur.

== Powers and abilities ==
Comet is able to fly at high speeds, leaving an ice trail behind. Comet can also generate a psionic aura which induces feelings of love in those around him. When he became an Angel of Love, he gained the ability to manifest wings made of ice.

== Other versions ==
- The pre-Crisis Comet appears in Supergirl: Cosmic Adventures in the 8th Grade.
- An alternate universe version of Comet appears in Superman: True Brit as a normal horse owned by Jonathan and Martha Kent.
- An alternate universe version of Comet from the Dark Multiverse appears in Sideways Annual #1. This version is a bat-like centaur who escaped the destruction of his universe and came to serve Perrus.

== Reception ==
Asked in a 2006 interview if Superman's extended cast of characters in the Silver Age weakened Superman's uniqueness, Action Comics writer Gail Simone answered: "Completely disagree. While cutting away the allegedly 'silly' aspects of Superman's mythology, we quite forgot that there's likely a large potential readership that might really enjoy a story about a superbaby or a flying horse. We all thought that stuff was cornball junk that needed to go, but I'll tell you right now, a lot of young girls would like Supergirl more if she had a flying horse".

== In other media ==
- Comet makes a cameo appearance in DC Super Hero Girls: Hero of the Year as Kara Zor-El's pet horse on Krypton.
- The pre-Crisis and post-Crisis incarnations of Comet appear as character summons in Scribblenauts Unmasked: A DC Comics Adventure.
- Comet appears in Krypto the Superdog #6. This version is from the 30th century.

== See also ==
- List of fictional horses
