= Proty =

Publication information
- Publisher: DC Comics
- First appearance: (I) Adventure Comics #308 (May 1963) (II) Superman's Pal Jimmy Olsen #72 (October 1963)
- Created by: Edmond Hamilton (script); John Forte

In-story information
- Species: Protean
- Place of origin: Antares star system
- Team affiliations: Legion of Super-Heroes; Legion of Super-Pets
- Abilities: Shapeshifting; Telepathy

Proty is the name of two characters appearing in American comic books published by DC Comics, primarily in association with the Legion of Super-Heroes. The original Proty first appears in Adventure Comics #308 (May 1963), where Chameleon Boy adopts him as a pet.

After Proty sacrifices itself to resurrect Lightning Lad, an identically-named Protean, dubbed "Proty II", is introduced as his successor. Following the reboot of the Legion's continuity in the 1994 event Zero Hour: Crisis in Time!, Proty has rarely been seen or referenced. The 1998 event DC One Million introduces Proty One Million, an 853rd-century member of the Justice Legion of Super-Zoomorphs inspired by Proty.

== Fictional character biography ==
An alien species called the Llorn founded a colony on the planet in the Antares system already inhabited by a species called the Proteans, who possess limited sentience and resemble soft white boulders. The two races live in harmony for years until the planet's sun becomes unstable. The Llorn realize the planet will soon suffer drastic changes to the climate and environment that will make the environment inhospitable for them. They decide to evacuate but cannot bring the whole Protean race with them, nor can the Proteans leave on their own. The Llorn use an "evolution ray" to give the Proteans shapeshifting abilities, allowing them to survive in any environment.

=== Proty I ===
During the 30th century, a Protean is captured and taken to an alien menagerie. He is later rescued by the Legion of Super-Heroes, a group of teenagers who protect the citizens of the United Planets. Chameleon Boy, a Durlan who also possesses shapeshifting abilities, adopts the creature as a pet, calling him "Proty".

Legion founder Garth Ranzz, also known as Lightning Lad, is killed battling Zaryan the Conqueror. A group of Daxamite scientists develop a machine that transfers life force from one person to another, reviving the recently dead but killing the "donor" in the process. Proty reads the mind of Saturn Girl and learns she intends to sacrifice her life to revive Lightning Lad. Proty tricks Saturn Girl into becoming lost in a cave, disguises itself as her, and dies in her place.

Following the 1985-1986 crossover Crisis on Infinite Earths, the Legion of Super-Heroes was reimagined, with their history being altered. A story published in 1992 revealed that Proty's consciousness was transferred into Garth Ranzz's body following his resurrection.

=== Proty II ===
Soon after the death of Proty, Chameleon Boy is shown as having another Protean as a pet. The pet is officially named Proty II or Proty Two, but many in the Legion simply call him "Proty". Proty later becomes a member of the Legion of Super-Pets, a team of super-powered animals who live in the 20th century. Through time travel technology, Proty is able to join the group on several missions. In the stories of the "Adult Legion", which take place in a possible future timeline, Proty has had a falling out with Chameleon Boy and become a full member of the Legion.

By the late 1970s, Proty largely disappears from comics. In Legion of Super-Heroes #300 (1983), Proty is revealed to have become a professional photographer and a recognized citizen of the United Planets. After photographing the new official Legion portrait, Proty expresses resent for being treated as a pet in the past and makes a sarcastic remark about no longer attending meetings of the Legion of Super-Pets.

=== Post-Zero Hour ===
The 1994 crossover Zero Hour: Crisis in Time! rebooted Legion continuity. In the new continuity, the Protean race attacks Earth while the Legion is facing the Fatal Five. The Legionnaires kill all but one of the Proteans, who is adopted by Lori Morning and named Proty.

=== DC Rebirth ===
Clay Critter, a character inspired by Proty, appears in Super-Sons Annual #1 as a deceased former member of the Legion of Super-Pets.

=== DC One Million ===
The crossover DC One Million introduces a possible future in the 853rd century, where many solar systems are defended by heroes who either carried the legacy of modern-day DC heroes or are their descendants. In DC One Million #4 (1998), Proty One Million is stated to be a member of the Justice Legion of Super-Zoomorphs.

== Powers and abilities ==
All versions of Proty are protoplasmic aliens capable of taking on any shape. With their malleable bodies and resistance to different environments, Proteans can survive in the vacuum of space.

Most Proteans are mute, but Proty II eventually developed a working tongue and voice box, allowing verbal communication.

Proteans possess limited telepathy, which allows them to read surface thoughts. With this ability, they can understand any language, understand the intentions of strangers who may be friend or foe, and take on forms they see in a person's mind.

== Other versions ==
Proty appears in Tiny Titans.

== In other media ==
Proty appears in Legion of Super-Heroes (2023). This version is the class pet of the Legion Academy.
