= Legion of Super-Pets =

Fictional superhero team

- The Legion of Super-Pets as depicted in Adventure Comics #322 (July 1964). Art by Curt Swan.

Publication information
- Publisher: DC Comics
- First appearance: Adventure Comics #293 (February 1962)
- Created by: Jerry Siegel; Curt Swan; Otto Binder

In-story information
- Member(s): Krypto the Superdog; Streaky the Supercat; Beppo the Super-Monkey; Comet the Super-Horse; Ch'p; B'dg; Proty II; Detective Chimp; Solovar; Terrific Whatzit; Jumpa; Hoppy the Marvel Bunny; Tawky Tawny; Gleek; Wonder Dog; Rex the Wonder Dog; Ace the Bat-Hound; Bat-Cow; Flexi the Plastic Bird; Clay Critter; Titus; Pooch; Streak the Wonder Dog; Haley; Fuzzy the Krypto Mouse

The Legion of Super-Pets is a team of superhero pets appearing in American comic books published by DC Comics. The original membership included Krypto, Streaky the Supercat, Beppo, and Comet, with the shape-shifting alien Proty II later joining. The team first appeared in Adventure Comics #293 (February 1962), although all of the members except for Comet had appeared individually in earlier issues. The group was removed from mainstream DC Comics continuity in 1986, but a new version appeared in mainstream comics in 2017.

The crossover series DC One Million in 1998 indicated that, in the 853rd century, a version of the team operates called the Justice Legion of Super-Zoomorphs. A follow-up story revealed that the universe of the 853rd century is protected by many teams representing the Legion of Super-Familiars, all of which are overseen by the Legion of Executive Familiars.

== Fictional history ==
The Legion of Super-Pets are a group of superpowered animals from the past who are gathered by Cosmic Boy, Lightning Lad, and Saturn Girl, the founding members of the Legion of Super-Heroes, to battle the alien Brain-Globes in the 31st century. After the Legion defeats the Brain-Globes, Saturn Girl declares the group of animals will be honored as the Legion of Super-Pets, a special branch of the Legion of Super-Heroes, before returning them to their times. The Legion of Super-Pets make several subsequent appearances, in which the shapeshifting alien Proty joins the team.

The Legion of Super-Pets and their history are removed from DC Comics canon following the Crisis on Infinite Earths continuity reboot (1985). The group is reintroduced in the Super Sons Annual (2018), and consists of Krypto, Streaky, Damian Wayne's dog Titus, Damian Wayne's cow Bat-Cow (a cow with a bat-shaped patch over its eyes, previously introduced in Batman Inc.), along with two new animals making their first appearance in the story: Flexi the Plastic Bird, a parrot with powers similar to Plastic Man, and Clay Critter, a creature resembling Proty, possibly related to Clayface. Other members include Ch'p and B'dg (H'lvenites from the Green Lantern Corps), Solovar (a super-powered sapient gorilla from Gorilla City), the Terrific Whatzit (a turtle with the Flash's powers), Jumpa (an Amazonian breed of kangaroo which was probably bred and originated in Themyscira, owned by Wonder Woman), Hoppy the Marvel Bunny (a rabbit with Captain Marvel's powers), Tawky Tawny (a sapient tiger, and a friend of Captain Marvel), Wonder Dog (Wendy and Marvin's pet dog), Rex the Wonder Dog, alongside his brother, Pooch (a pair of white shepherd dog brothers from the U.S. Army's K-9 Corps), Ace the Bat-Hound (Batman's dog originally owned by an engraver named John Wilker), Streak the Wonder Dog (Alan Scott's pet dog and sidekick companion), and Fuzzy, a mouse who gained Kryptonian powers from exposure to an unusual form of kryptonite. In the special issue Bitedentity Crisis (2024), Gleek is revealed to have joined the Legion of Super-Pets and Ace temporarily recruits Nightwing's dog Haley into the group.

== Other versions ==
Several variations of the Legion of Super-Pets appear in "DC One Million". The first, the Justice Legion of Super-Zoomorphs, are led by Proty One Million and Master Mind, descendants of Proty and Mister Mind. DC One Million 80-Page Giant #1 introduces a coalition of super-powered animal teams collectively known as the Legion of Super-Familiars. They are led by the Legion of Executive Familiars, which includes Krypto-9, a descendant of Krypto; Octus, an eighth-dimensional cephalopod; Wormhole, a teleporting worm; and the twin sun-dogs Phaethon and Savitar.

== In other media ==
=== Television ===
- The Legion of Super-Pets appear in the Robot Chicken episode "Tubba-Bubba's Now Hubba-Hubba", consisting of Comet, Streaky, Krypto, Beppo, and "Hissy the Super-Snake". Superman returns to the Fortress of Solitude from a month in space to find the pets have frozen to death because their babysitter mistakenly thought she was watching them the month after.
- The Legion of Super-Pets appear in the DC Nation short "Superman 75th Anniversary", consisting of Beppo, Streaky, and Krypto.

=== Film ===
The Legion of Super-Pets, renamed the League of Super-Pets, appear in DC League of Super-Pets, consisting of Krypto, Ace the Bat-Hound, the Terrific Whatzit, Chip, PB, a pot-bellied pig with size-shifting powers, and Mark and Keith, a pair of guinea pigs who possess pyrokinesis and hydrokinesis, respectively.

== See also ==
Lockjaw and the Pet Avengers
