= Space Canine Patrol Agents =

DC Comics superheroes

Publication information
- Publisher: DC Comics
- First appearance: Superboy #131 (July 1966)
- Created by: Otto Binder; George Papp

In-story information
- Member(s): Tail Terrier; Mammoth Mutt; Hot Dog; Tusky Husky; Bull Dog; Paw Pooch; Chameleon Collie; Prophetic Pup; Krypto; Mammoth Miss; Beam Beagle

The Space Canine Patrol Agents, or SCPA is a group of anthropomorphic extraterrestrial canine superheroes that appeared in American comic books published by DC Comics.

== History ==
The SCPA first appeared in Superboy #131 (July 1966). The team is similar to the Legion of Super-Heroes, being a group of alien superheroes with descriptive or alliterative codenames. Krypto, Superman's Kryptonian dog, was a member of the SCPA. The SCPA are based in a headquarters resembling a doghouse; their symbol is the constellation Canis Major, also known as the Greater Dog.

The SCPA are presumed to have been wiped out of existence after Crisis on Infinite Earths. In Animal Man, the SCPA appear as residents of Limbo, a dimension where characters that have been written out of continuity reside. While visiting Limbo, Merryman of the Inferior Five stated to Animal Man that even if some of these characters may be brought back, times have changed; the Space Canine Patrol Agents are unlikely to return.

== Membership ==
The Space Canine Patrol Agents roster included:

- Tail Terrier: Has an elastic tail that can be used as a rope. "Top Dog" of the SCPA.
- Mammoth Mutt: Can inflate to many times his size. He died in his first appearance after being punctured by a missile.
- Hot Dog: Pyrokinetic
- Tusky Husky: Can turn one of his canine teeth into a long tusk.
- Bull Dog: Can grow horns.
- Paw Pooch: Can grow additional limbs.
- Chameleon Collie: Shapeshifter
- Prophetic Pup: Clairvoyant
- Krypto: A Kryptonian dog with similar powers to Superman.
- Mammoth Miss: Mammoth Mutt's girlfriend, who possesses the same powers as him.
- Beam Beagle: Possessed "searchlight eyes". Died in the line of duty.

== In other media ==
A group inspired by the Space Canine Patrol Agents called the Dog Star Patrol appears in Krypto the Superdog, led by series original character Brainy Barker (voiced by Ellen Kennedy), who has psychic abilities, and consisting of Tail Terrier (voiced by Peter Kelamis), a female incarnation of Mammoth Mutt (voiced by Kelly Sheridan), Hot Dog (voiced by Trevor Devall), Tusky Husky (voiced by Terry Klassen), Bull Dog (voiced by Michael Dobson), and Paw Pooch (voiced by Dale Wilson). Additionally, Krypto, Streaky, and Ace the Bat-Hound become members later in the series, as do series original characters Drooly (voiced by Ty Olsson), who can create prehensile streams of saliva, and Stretch-o-Mutt (voiced by Lee Tockar), who possesses elasticity and shapeshifting abilities.
