= Ace the Bat-Hound =

DC Comics character

- Ace the Bat-Hound as depicted in Batman: Urban Legends #15 (May 2022), art by Karl Mostert and Trish Mulvihill.

Publication information
- Publisher: DC Comics
- First appearance: Batman #92 (June 1955)
- Created by: Bill Finger (writer); Sheldon Moldoff (artist)

In-story information
- Species: Domestic dog (Canis lupus familiaris)
- Place of origin: Earth
- Team affiliations: Justice League; Legion of Super-Pets; Space Canine Patrol Agents
- Supporting character of: Batman; Robin; Alfred Pennyworth; Krypto; Streaky
- Abilities: Agility; Keen sense of smell

Ace the Bat-Hound is a superhero dog appearing in American comic books published by DC Comics. He is commonly featured as the canine crime-fighting partner of Batman and as an ally of other animal superheroes, such as Krypto, Streaky, and the Legion of Super-Pets.

The character made his cinematic debut in the animated film DC League of Super-Pets, which was released in the United States on July 29, 2022.

== Publication history ==
Ace the Bat-Hound's first appearance in Batman #92 (July 1955), art by Win Mortimer and Ira Schnapp.

Ace debuted in Batman #92 (June 1955) and was created by writer Bill Finger and artist Sheldon Moldoff. Ace's introduction followed on Krypto's debut in Adventure Comics #210 (March 1955), and by German Shepherd dogs from detective films and serials, such as Rin Tin Tin and Ace the Wonder Dog.

Ace, along with Batwoman, Bat-Girl, and Bat-Mite, was retired from the comic in 1964, when editor Julius Schwartz instituted a "New Look" Batman that shed some of the sillier elements in the series.

== Fictional character biography ==
=== Pre-Crisis ===
Ace was a German Shepherd Dog originally owned by an engraver named John Wilker. He was found by Batman and Robin after his master was kidnapped by a gang of counterfeiters. Batman used Ace to try to locate Wilker. Because he had already placed a large number of "lost dog" announcements for Ace in his civilian identity of Bruce Wayne, he was concerned that anyone recognizing Ace might make the connection between Bruce Wayne and Batman. To forestall that problem, he improvised a hood-like mask for the dog that incorporated the bat-emblem as a dog tag. Ace was subsequently christened the Bat-Hound by a criminal that the dog helped Batman to apprehend.

Wilker later took a new job that made it difficult for him to take care of Ace, so he left the dog to Bruce Wayne. Wilker was never aware that Bruce Wayne was Batman.

An early case involved Ace tracking down a mentally unhinged ancient weapons expert. At one point, Ace acquired superpowers thanks to Bat-Mite, but this was short-lived. He did have his own training. For example; his specialized radio collar, when activated, told him to don his own mask (via a hands-free device) and track down Batman and Robin. Ace was used less and less over time, and for various reasons. When Bruce was overcome with night terrors, Robin suggested that Ace sleep beside him.

Ace disappeared from the Batman comics after Julius Schwartz took over as editor in 1964. His last appearance was a cameo in a story where Batman had lost his fighting spirit.

=== Post-Crisis ===
Ace, as he appeared on the final panel of Batman #462 (June 1991) by Alan Grant and Norm Breyfogle.

The original Ace appears as a resident of Limbo in Animal Man and Final Crisis.

A post-Crisis version of Ace is reintroduced in Batman #462 (June 1991) by Alan Grant and Norm Breyfogle. This version is an English Mastiff and was originally a guide dog belonging to a blind Native American named Black Wolf, who simply called him "Dog". The dog assists Batman in fighting men from Black Wolf's tribe, who are suspects in the murder of a collector of Native American material culture. Following Black Wolf's death, Batman adopts Dog, renaming him Ace. Ace has at times helped Batman on cases and is depicted to be very affectionate towards his owner and vice versa.

After Batman has his back broken by Bane, Azrael takes over the identity during his recovery and ejects Ace, Nightwing, Robin, and Harold Allnut from the Batcave. Harold, a trusted confidante of Batman, takes in Ace; they live in a part of the caverns that Azrael is unfamiliar with.

=== The New 52 ===
In Batman and Robin Vol. 1: Born to Kill, as part of The New 52 (a 2011 reboot of the DC Comics universe), Bruce is seen purchasing a black Great Dane from a kennel. He later gives this dog to his son, Damian, who names him Titus. Damian rejects the dog at first, but eventually bonds with him. Writer Peter Tomasi revealed that he thought about naming Damian's dog Ace, but decided that "it was best not to drop [Ace] in at this point in the New 52".

=== DC Rebirth ===
In DC Rebirth, a different Ace was introduced in Batman vol. 3 Annual #1, in which he is depicted as a former guard dog of the Joker who fought Batman until Joker left him and the other dogs without food in a ditch to fight amongst themselves. The dogs had card symbols on them, and the brown dog with an ace on it killed the others. He was sent to the Gotham Pound, and Alfred adopted him two days later. To facilitate this, Alfred actually purchases the Gotham Pound, turning it into the Martha and Thomas Wayne Humane Society. Alfred spends the next couple of months training the dog despite Bruce's objections, as he thinks Ace's wounds from the Joker's actions cannot be healed. Despite this, Alfred manages to properly train him in time for Christmas, and Bruce starts bonding with the dog after getting injured during one of his night shifts. He gets Ace a bat-mask for Christmas and calls him a "Bat Hound".

== Other versions ==
- An alternate universe version of Ace appears in Kingdom Come. This version is the winged steed of the Fourth World Batwoman.
- An alternate universe version of Ace appears in Batman: Castle of the Bat. This version is a dog-bat hybrid created by Bruce Wayne.
- An alternate universe version of Ace appears in DCeased: Unkillables.
- A pre-Crisis version of Ace called Nighthound appears in World's Finest #143 as the telepathic Kandorian companion of Nightwing.

== In other media ==
=== Television ===
Ace the Bat-Hound as he appeared in Krypto the Superdog.

- Ace appears in series set in the DC Animated Universe (DCAU), with vocal effects provided by a dog owned by writer/producer Robert Goodman.
  - First appearing in Batman Beyond, this version is a Great Dane mix who was involved in an illegal dog fighting ring as a puppy, but eventually escaped and was adopted by an elderly Bruce Wayne, becoming his sole companion in Wayne Manor until they meet Terry McGinnis.
  - Ace makes a cameo appearance in the Static Shock episode "Future Shock".
- Ace appears in Krypto the Superdog, voiced by Scott McNeil. This version is a member of the Dog Star Patrol who uses various gadgets, similar to Batman.
- Ace appears in Batman: The Brave and the Bold, with vocal effects provided by Dee Bradley Baker.
- Ace appears in the "DC Super-Pets!" segment of DC Nation Shorts, voiced by Diedrich Bader.
- Ace appears in Robot Chicken DC Comics Special 2: Villains in Paradise.
- Ace appears in the Justice League Action episode "Best Day Ever".
- Ace appears in DC Super Hero Girls (2019), with vocal effects provided again by Dee Bradley Baker. This version is Barbara Gordon's pet and a retired Gotham City Police Department dog who was originally partnered with Barbara's father Commissioner Jim Gordon.
- A young Ace appears in Batwheels.
- Ace appears in Teen Titans Go!.

=== Film ===
- The DCAU incarnation of Ace appears in Batman Beyond: Return of the Joker, with vocal effects provided again by Frank Welker.
- Ace appears in Lego DC Comics Super Heroes: The Flash as a member of the Justice League.
- A robotic Ace appears in Batman Unlimited: Animal Instincts and Batman Unlimited: Monster Mayhem. It was originally created to serve in the Penguin's "Animiltia" before Batman reprogrammed it to help him thwart the Penguin.
- Ace appears in DC League of Super-Pets, voiced by Kevin Hart. This version is a boxer who was abandoned by his family after he bit their infant daughter's arm while saving her from falling down a flight of stairs. In the present, he gains super-strength and invulnerability from exposure to orange Kryptonite and joins forces with Krypto and other empowered shelter pets to rescue the Justice League. Afterward, Ace is adopted by Batman and becomes a founding member of the titular League of Super-Pets.

=== Video games ===
- Ace appears as an NPC in Scribblenauts Unmasked: A DC Comics Adventure.
- Ace appears as an unlockable playable character in Lego Batman 3: Beyond Gotham, with vocal effects provided again by Dee Bradley Baker.
- Ace appears as a playable character in DC League of Super Pets: The Adventures of Krypto and Ace.

=== Miscellaneous ===
- Ace's appeal is discussed in Mythology: The DC Comics Art of Alex Ross. Ross feels that as a child, the idea of Batman having a dog is "cool", but as an adult the same idea is "outrageous".
- Ace appears in DC Super Hero Girls (2015).
- The robotic Ace appears in the Batman Unlimited shorts.
