= Krypto the Superdog (TV series) =

American children's animated television series

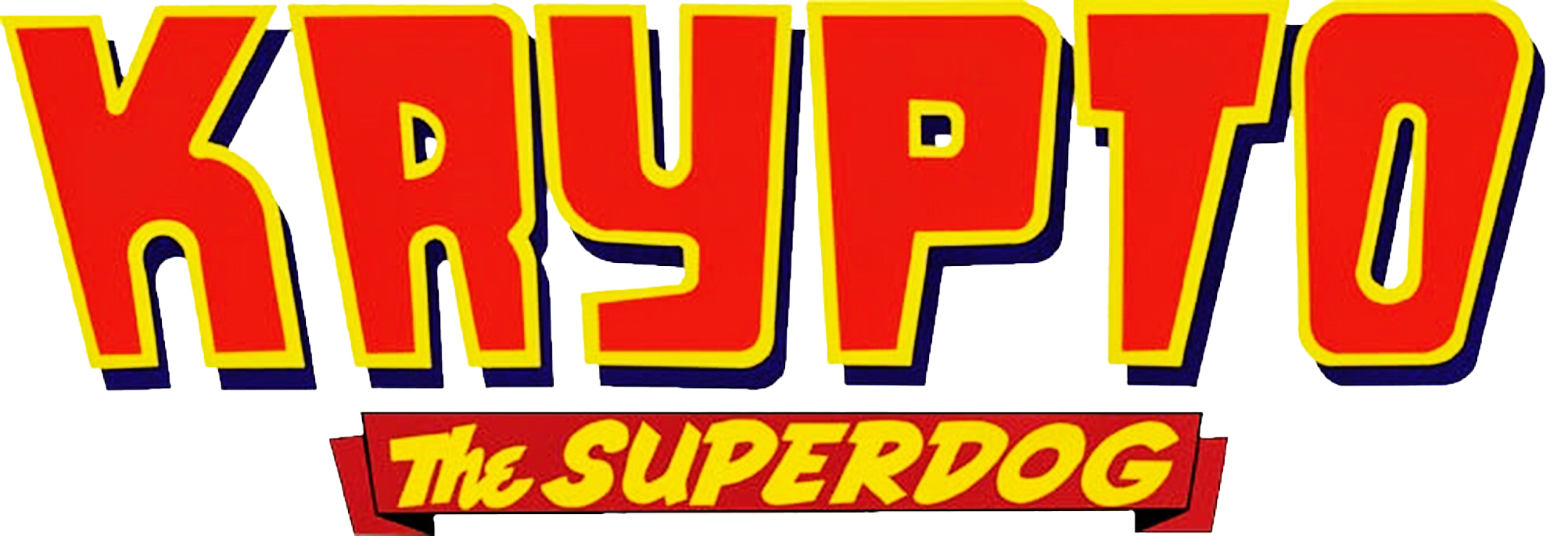
- Genre: Comedy; Superhero
- Based on: Krypto by: Otto Binder; Curt Swan
- Developed by: Alan Burnett; Paul Dini
- Directed by: Scott Jeralds
- Voices of: Sam Vincent; Brian Drummond; Scott McNeil; Ellen Kennedy; Kelly Sheridan; Michael Dobson; Dale Wilson; Peter Kelamis; Terry Klassen; Trevor Devall; Alberto Ghisi; Tabitha St. Germain; Nicole Oliver; Mark Oliver; Nicole Bouma
- Theme music composer: At Last
- Opening theme: Krypto the Superdog (performed by At Last)
- Ending theme: Krypto the Superdog (instrumental)
- Composer: William Kevin Anderson
- Country of origin: United States
- Original language: English
- No. of seasons: 2
- No. of episodes: 39 (75 segments)

Production
- Executive producer: Sander Schwartz
- Producers: Paul Dini; Linda M. Steiner
- Editors: Illya Cano; Susan Edmunson; Ken Solomon
- Running time: 22 minutes
- Production companies: DC Comics; Warner Bros. Family Entertainment; Warner Bros. Animation

Original release
- Network: Cartoon Network
- Release: March 25, 2005 – December 15, 2006

Krypto the Superdog is an American superhero animated television series produced by Warner Bros. Animation, based on Superman's canine companion Krypto, which premiered on Cartoon Network on March 25, 2005 (exactly 50 years after his comic debut), and aired on The CW's Saturday morning block Kids' WB from September 23, 2006, until September 15, 2007. 39 episodes were produced.

A comic book series (based on the TV show) was published by DC Comics under the Johnny DC imprint, which lasted 6 issues, from 2006 to 2007.

The show was developed by producers Alan Burnett and Paul Dini, who had produced the successful Batman: The Animated Series and Superman: The Animated Series. Instead of continuing in that style, Krypto was produced in a manner reminiscent of the Hanna-Barbera shows of the 1960s to the 1980s, from the sound effects down to the animation style. (Veteran Hanna-Barbera designer Iwao Takamoto served as a creative consultant.)

== Plot ==
As the planet Krypton is about to be destroyed, Superman's father Jor-El makes a spaceship and puts a puppy named Krypto into it for a test flight. Aboard the ship, Krypto was playing with his ball when he accidentally destroyed several wires, causing the ship to release a sleeping gas to put him into a deep sleep while it heads to Earth. When he arrived in Earth's Solar System, Krypto woke up and found himself fully grown. The rocket's computer system gave him a collar and an ID with an intergalactic communicator.

On Earth, Krypto possesses superpowers similar to those of Superman, since all Kryptonian life-forms (including Superman himself) gain superpowers from exposure to a yellow sun. Later, he is adopted by Kevin Whitney, a 9-year-old boy, with whom Superman arranges for him to stay, as Superman himself is often too busy saving the world to take care of him. Krypto poses as an ordinary dog while living with Kevin's family, but adopts the secret identity of Krypto the Superdog for his superheroic deeds; Kevin is aware of Krypto's dual identity, but the rest of his family does not, excluding his spoiled cousin Bailey, who found out accidentally. Kevin lives next door to Andrea, a girl who takes care of Krypto's best friend, Streaky.

In the series, the various animals, including Krypto, all are capable of speaking to each other, but not to humans, except for Kevin and later Andrea, who are able to communicate with Krypto and the other animals with intergalactic communicators. The viewers can understand them, though, especially when Krypto and Streaky talk to the camera.

With his allies Streaky the Supercat, Ace the Bat-Hound, and Stretch-O-Mutt, Krypto fights the plots of Lex Luthor's pet iguana Ignatius, Joker's pet hyenas Bud and Lou, Penguin's trained birds called the Bad News Birds, and Catwoman's cat Isis. When working either alone or with a group of alien dog superheroes known as the Dog Star Patrol, Krypto faces off against the evil Mechanikat and his agents Snooky Wookums and Delilah.

== Cast and characters ==
The main protagonists of the series. From left to right: Ace the Bat-Hound, Brainy Barker, Hot Dog, Krypto the Superdog, Tusky Husky, Mammoth Mutt, Paw Pooch, Bull Dog, and Streaky the Supercat.

=== Main ===
- Krypto the Superdog (voiced by Samuel Vincent) is a white Labrador Retriever and the main protagonist of the show, formerly Superman's pet on Krypton.
- Streaky the Supercat (voiced by Brian Drummond), Krypto's best friend and sidekick, is an orange Somali cat with a yellow streak along his back who lives next door to Krypto and Kevin's family. In the series' third episode, "The Streaky Story", Streaky gains Kryptonian powers after being hit by a duplication ray that bounced off Krypto.
- Ace the Bat-Hound (voiced by Scott McNeil) is Batman's pet German Shepherd (though Ace says that he is Batman's partner) who is an ally of Krypto, Streaky and the Dog Star Patrol.
- Kevin Whitney (voiced by Alberto Ghisi) is the 9-year-old young boy who Krypto lives with in the series, with Superman's permission.
- Andrea Sussman (voiced by Tabitha St. Germain) is Kevin's next-door neighbor and the owner of Streaky.

The Dog Star Patrol are a superpowered group of dog-like aliens who each possess a unique superpower, and fight crime across the galaxy. Members of the Dog Star Patrol include:

- Brainy Barker (voiced by Ellen Kennedy) is a purple Saluki (though she claims to be an Afghan Hound in one episode), and leader of the Dog Star Patrol. She possesses telekinetic and telepathic abilities.
- Mammoth Mutt (voiced by Kelly Sheridan) is a pink Chihuahua with the ability to inflate her body to an enormous ball-shaped size, allowing her to use her size to attack foes.
- Bull Dog (voiced by Michael Dobson) is a lavender Bulldog with a stereotypical British accent and retractable, bull-like horns.
- Paw Pooch (voiced by Dale Wilson) is a yellow and brown Basset Hound with eight legs that enable him to dig and run quickly.
- Tail Terrier (voiced by Peter Kelamis) is a green Scottish Terrier with the ability to stretch his tail and use it like a rope or lasso.
- Tusky Husky (voiced by Terry Klassen) is a sky blue Siberian Husky with a stereotypical French-Canadian accent. He has a hard, massive tusk at the front of his mouth that he can use to break or drill through objects.
- Hot Dog (voiced by Trevor Devall) is a red Dachshund with the ability to generate tremendous heat from his body and breathe fire.
- Drooly (voiced by Ty Olsson) is an Old English Sheepdog who can use his drool as a weapon.

=== Supporting ===
- Superman (voiced by Michael Daingerfield): The main superhero of Metropolis and Krypto's original owner who was only seen in "Krypto's Scrypto".
- Stretch-O-Mutt (voiced by Lee Tockar): Buddy, a Bloodhound at S.T.A.R. Labs, accidentally fell into a vat of chemicals and developed shape-changing powers similar to Plastic Man and Elongated Man.
- Thundermutt (voiced by Phil Hayes) is a German Shepherd who is an egotistical, world-famous canine actor.
- Jimmy the Rat (voiced by Phil Hayes) is a rat and informant for Krypto and Ace.
- Robbie the Bird Wonder (voiced by David Paul Grove) is an American robin. Like Batman's sidekick Robin, Robbie is also Ace's sidekick.
- The Supercat Fan Club is a group of kittens who are fans of Streaky, and occasionally assist him in crime-fighting despite not having powers. They consist of Streaky's nephew Squeaky (voiced by Lee Tockar), Nikki (voiced by Kathleen Barr), Puff (voiced by Samuel Vincent), and Ramone (voiced by Brian Drummond).
- Melanie Whitney (voiced by Tabitha St. Germain) is Kevin's 2-year-old baby sister.
- Mary Whitney (voiced by Nicole Oliver) is Kevin's overworked but well-meaning mother.
- Smokey (voiced by Phil Hayes): A Dalmatian who appeared in "Old Dog, New Tricks".
- Blaze: A Dalmatian puppy who appeared in "Old Dog, New Tricks".
- Dooley (voiced by Brad Swaile) is a dolphin who befriends Krypto and Streaky when they were turned into fish in "Furry Fish".
- Dogbot (voiced by Scott McNeil) is a robot dog built by Jor-El.

=== Antagonists ===
- Mechanikat (voiced by Mark Oliver) is the main antagonist of the series and is based on Metallo who is a cyborg feline.
- Snooky Wookums (voiced by Nicole Bouma) is Mechanikat's kitten sidekick and secret agent.
- Delilah (voiced by Kathleen Barr) is another feline agent of Mechanikat.
- The Katbots are the foot soldiers of Mechanikat.
- Ignatius (voiced by Scott McNeil) is the pet green iguana of Superman's archenemy, Lex Luthor.

==== Other antagonists ====
- Lex Luthor (voiced by Brian Dobson) is an evil genius and the owner of Ignatius.
- Bud and Lou (voiced by Peter Kelamis and Lee Tockar) are a pair of spotted hyenas who serve the Joker.
- Isis (voiced by Kathleen Barr) is Catwoman's Siamese cat who is seductive, a master thief, and flirts with Batman’s dog Ace. This is similar to how Catwoman often flirts with his owner.
- The Bad News Birds are three trained birds who work with the Penguin and are usually up to some elaborate caper. They consist of the puffin Artie (voiced by Dale Wilson), vulture Griff (voiced by Matt Hill), and penguin Waddles (voiced by Terry Klassen),
- Dogwood (voiced by Louis Chirillo) is a dog-plant hybrid who can bring plants to life.
- Mertin the Magnificent (voiced by Scott McNeil) is a magician's rabbit who wields a magic wand that he stole from his master.
- Superflea (voiced by Scott McNeil) is a Kryptonian flea who stowed away on Krypto's ship.
- The Junkyard Dogs is a group of never-do-well stray dogs. They consist of Mutsy (voiced by Lee Tockar), Beazel (voiced by Brian Drummond), and Beane (voiced by Samuel Vincent). Rosie (voiced by Janyse Jaud) was formerly part of the group and Mutsy's girlfriend, but later left and was adopted by flower saleswoman Mrs. Fritch.
- Bailey (voiced by Reece Thompson) is Kevin and Melanie's bratty cousin, who bullies Kevin and Krypto.
- Blackbeak (voiced by Brian Drummond) is a thorn on Stretch-O-Mutt's side.
- Barrump Barrump (voiced by Phil Hayes) is a sinister space monkey and prankster.

== Production ==
The series existence was first mentioned in September 2003.

== Episodes ==
All episodes were directed by Scott Jeralds.

=== Series overview ===
Season	Episodes	Originally released	
Season	Episodes	First released	Last released
1	26	March 25, 2005	December 5, 2005
2	13	April 24, 2006	December 15, 2006

=== Season 1 (2005) ===
No. overall	No. in season	Title	Written by	Original release date
1	1	"Krypto's Scrypto"	Story by : Alan Burnett & Paul Dini; Teleplay by : Alan Burnett	March 25, 2005
Part 1: After his spaceship malfunctions, Krypto arrives on Earth and befriends a 9-year-old young boy named Kevin, who takes him in. Part 2: Krypto must rescue a drowning ship full of zoo animals. After that, he later meets a familiar face from Krypton.
2	2	"Super-Flea" "A Bug's Strife"	Ken Pontac Alan Burnett & Paul Dini	April 5, 2005
Super-Flea: A Kryptonian flea gives Krypto one super itch. A Bug's Strife: Lex Luthor's pet lizard Ignatius uses a growth ray to turn a caterpillar into a giant monster.
3	3	"Meet the Dog Stars" "The Streaky Story"	John Loy Jennifer Evans Gardner	April 6, 2005
Meet the Dog Stars: A group of alien superdogs come to earth to catch villainous cat Mechanikat and his sidekick Snooky Wookums who have been wreaking havoc all over the cosmos. The Streaky Story: After a duplicating ray accidentally gives him Krypto's powers, Streaky learns about the responsibility that comes with his new abilities and, with help from Krypto, becomes a superhero.
4	4	"Diaper Madness" "Feline Fatale"	Alan Burnett & Paul Dini Tim Cahill & Julie McNally Cahill	April 8, 2005
Diaper Madness: Kevin and Krypto have to babysit Melanie while Kevin's mom is away, and must rescue her after a teleporter device from S.T.A.R. Labs ends up in her diaper. Feline Fatale: When an agent of Mechanikat plans to use a disintegrating ray on Krypto, it is up to Streaky to save the day.
5	5	"Dog-Gone Kevin" "The Dark Hound Strikes!"	John Loy Paul Dini	April 10, 2005
Dog-Gone Kevin: After finding red kryptonite for the very first time, Krypto and Kevin switch bodies, and each of them discovers how great it is to be the other. The Dark Hound Strikes!: Ace the Bat-Hound, Batman's pet dog arrives in Metropolis and enlists Krypto's help to stop the Joker's hyenas.
6	6	"My Pet Boy" "Dem Bones"	Matthew Wilson Jennifer Evans Gardner	April 11, 2005
My Pet Boy: Kevin learns to take it easy on dogs—even if they have superpowers like Krypto, when he becomes a pet for a giant dog. Dem Bones: When the normal dogs imitate other animals, they discover that Mechanikat and Snooky Wookums are up to no good—and Mechanikat exposes Krypto to green kryptonite—and it is up to Streaky to save the day.
7	7	"Bat Hound for a Day" "Dogbot"	Len Uhley	April 12, 2005
Bat Hound for a Day: When red Kryptonite renders Krypto powerless, Ace gives him a Bat-collar so that they can track down the Penguin's birds. Dogbot: Kevin uncovers a Kryptonian robot dog inside Krypto's spaceship, but this new friend only wants to play with Krypto and is jealous of Kevin.
8	8	"Old Dog, New Tricks" "Talk to the Animals"	Tim Cahill & Julie McNally Cahill John Loy	April 13, 2005
Old Dog, New Tricks: Krypto and Streaky meet up with veteran fire Dalmatian Smokey who has just learned that a new puppy is joining the fire station crew. Streaky assumes that the new dog is Smokey's "replacement" and decides to use Krypto as his super-double. Talk to the Animals: Kevin loses his communicator, which zookeeper Bernie finds, and a monkey, Albert, tricks him into releasing the animals from their cages. It is up to Krypto and Bernie to get all of the animals back to the zoo.
9	9	"My Uncle, the Superhero" "Top Dog"	John Loy	April 14, 2005
My Uncle, the Superhero: Streaky wants to impress his nephew, Squeaky, by making him believe that he is a big-time superhero. Top Dog: A movie star dog wears a superpowered suit after making a pact with Snooky Wookums.
10	10	"Puss in Space Boots" "Teeny Tiny Trouble"	Ken Koonce & Michael Merton	April 15, 2005
Puss in Space Boots: Krypto is missing and it is up to Streaky and the Dog Star Patrol to rescue him. Teeny Tiny Trouble: Two small aliens from the planet Teeniton, both named Pleek, turn to Krypto and Kevin to help fix their broken spaceship, shrinking them to their size to do so.
11	11	"Dogbot to the Rescue" "Bad Bailey"	Michael Maler Wendell Morris	April 18, 2005
Dogbot to the Rescue: Streaky programs Dogbot to help Krypto out so that he can have more time with Kevin. Bad Bailey: Kevin's nasty cousin Bailey blackmails him after discovering Krypto's secret identity.
12	12	"Bat Hound's Bad Luck" "Circus of the Dog Stars"	Ken Pontac John Loy	April 19, 2005
Bat Hound's Bad Luck: Catwoman's cat, Isis, steals a cursed gem that causes Ace to run into a string of bad luck. Circus of the Dog Stars: Snooky Wookums uses brainwashing collars to make the Dog Star Patrol perform in a space circus.
13	13	"The Living End" "The Dog Days of Winter"	Matt Wayne Bill Matheny	April 20, 2005
The Living End: The Dog Star Patrol discovers red Kryptonite on the Moon, which causes Krypto's tail to become sentient and detach from his body. Thus, the heroes must stop him as he wreaks havoc throughout Metropolis. The Dog Days of Winter: Ignatius changes the weather, making it summer during the winter.
14	14	"Bad Hair Day" "The Cat and the Bat"	Ken Pontac John Loy	April 21, 2005
Bad Hair Day: Ignatius creates a formula to grow super hair, in an attempt to make a coat out of Krypto's fur. The Cat and the Bat: Ace and Streaky must team up when Krypto is away.
15	15	"Melanie's Monkey" "Funny Business"	Bradley Zweig Ken Koonce & Michael Merton	April 22, 2005
Melanie's Monkey: Melanie encounters a lost monkey, and a black panther stalks the two while Kevin and Krypto look for its parents. Funny Business: Ace becomes too silly to fight crime after being affected by giggle bubbles while pursuing the Joker's hyenas.
16	16	"Now You See Him..." "Bones of Contention"	Earl Kress Andy Merrill	April 25, 2005
Now You See Him...: Streaky accidentally gets the power of invisibility, but soon learns about the problems that it can cause. Bones of Contention: Snooky Wookums in disguise gives the Dog Star Patrol chew toys designed to make them angrier and get on each other's nerves.
17	17	"Superdog? Who's Superdog?" "The Good Life"	Wendell Morris John Loy	April 26, 2005
Superdog? Who's Superdog?: Krypto gets amnesia due to red kryptonite, and the Junkyard Dogs manipulate him into evil. The Good Life: Tail Terrier finds out that Krypto's civilian life is practically paradise and decides to become an Earth dog himself. He soon discovers, however, that the grass is not always greener on the other side of the fence.
18	18	"Streaky's Supercat Tale" "The New Recruit"	Paul Dini Mark Garabedian	April 27, 2005
Streaky's Supercat Tale: Streaky tells a tall tale to his fan club about how he helped Krypto stop Mechanikat. The New Recruit: Drooly tries applying for membership in the Dog Star Patrol before Snooky Wookums launches his next plan.
19	19	"Up, Up and Away" "Dinosaur Time"	Ken Koonce & Michael Merton Joseph Kuhr	April 28, 2005
Up, Up and Away: When Kevin and his class eat Ignatius's lighter-than-air muffins and begin floating away, it's up to Krypto to rescue them and get them safely down on solid ground. Dinosaur Time: Ignatius uses a time machine to travel back in time to the period of the dinosaurs, but Krypto and Kevin come back with him.
20	20	"Puppy Problems" "Switching Sides"	Ken Koonce & Michael Merton Steven Darancette	April 29, 2005
Puppy Problems: Mechanikat turns Krypto and the Dog Star Patrol into puppies with a ray. Switching Sides: Krypto and Ignatius are forced to team up to investigate Mechanikat and Snooky Wookums's thefts at Lexcorp.
21	21	"Leaf of Absence" "Big Sister"	Len Uhley Ken Koonce & Michael Merton	May 2, 2005
Leaf of Absence: Krypto and Ace take on a mutant dog-plant hybrid who is stealing all the trees in Metropolis. Big Sister: The Pleeks visit Earth, and their growth ray accidentally turns Melanie into a 50-foot giant toddler.
22	22	"Bat Hound Meets the Dog Stars" "A Dog's Life"	John Loy George August Patterson & Brennan Czar	May 27, 2005
Bat Hound Meets the Dog Stars: While the Dog Star Patrol are repairing their ship on Earth, Krypto introduces them to Ace. He is soon mocked for not having powers, but Ace is not bothered by it and leaves. When Snooky Wookums abducts Hot Dog, Ace may be the only one the Dog Star Patrol can count on. A Dog's Life: Tired of living like a rat, Jimmy disguises himself as a dog, but when Muttsy's group wants him to join them, he may be in way over his head.
23	23	"Stray for a Day" "Ruffled Feathers"	Joseph Kuhr Ralph Soll	June 3, 2005
Stray for a Day: A royal cat takes the day off with Streaky, allowing Isis to steal the Queen's jewels. Ruffled Feathers: Krypto becomes jealous when he thinks Kevin likes Ace more than him.
24	24	"Bat Hound and the Robin" "Furry Fish"	Ken Koonce & Michael Merton Wendell Morris	June 10, 2005
Bat Hound and the Robin: Ace is at his wits' end when a feisty robin decides to become his crimefighting partner. Furry Fish: Red Kryptonite turns Krypto and Streaky into fish, and with the help of the dolphin Dooley, they must stop Mechanikat's plan to steal sand and mass-produce cat litter.
25	25	"Tusky's Tooth" "When Penguins Fly"	Nancy French Joseph Kuhr	June 17, 2005
Tusky's Tooth: When Tusky Husky loses his tooth, he puts it under his pillow for the tooth fairy. Mechanikat steals it and wants to use it to destroy the Dog Star Patrol's ship. When Penguins Fly: Waddles tricks Streaky into getting into a machine at S.T.A.R. Labs that lets him steal his powers.
26	26	"Storybook Holiday"	Story by : Matt Wayne & Alan Burnett; Teleplay by : Matt Wayne	December 5, 2005
Part 1: Kevin buys a book for Melanie when his relatives come to visit. Desperate to get away from them, he accidentally reads a spell that sends him inside the book. It is up to Krypto to go after him. Part 2: Krypto finally finds Kevin. As they prepare to escape from the magic book, Kevin realizes that being with his family is preferable to it.

=== Season 2 (2006) ===
No. overall	No. in season	Title	Written by	Original release date
27	1	"Kids in Capes" "Attack of the Virtual Vegetables"	Corey Powell Mark Garabedian	April 24, 2006
Kids in Capes: Red Kryptonite gives Kevin and Andrea Krypto's powers, and Krypto and Streaky must protect them as they attempt to do good throughout the city. Attack of the Virtual Vegetables: Kevin plays one of his dad's old video games on Krypto's rocket computer, but when he gets transported into the game, Krypto and Streaky have to help him fight to the end of it.
28	2	"Mechani-Bot" "Stretch-O-Mutt to the Rescue"	Joseph Kuhr Paul Dini	April 25, 2006
Mechani-Bot: When Mechanikat creates a robot double of himself, he soon finds that his creation has a mind of its own, and is forced to ally with the Dog Star Patrol to stop it. Stretch-O-Mutt to the Rescue: STAR Labs guard Buddy accidentally slips into a vat of chemicals and becomes able to stretch and mold his body.
29	3	"Growing Pains" "K-9 Krusader"	David Teitelbaum & Jeff Elmassian Phil Harnage	April 26, 2006
Growing Pains: Mechanikat uses an aging ray on Krypto, but accidentally hits Kevin in the process as well. K-9 Krusader: Thundermutt asks Ace if he can study the way Ace fights crime so he can perform in his new movie. Ace soon realizes the pain of helping him out.
30	4	"Andrea Finds Out" "Magic Mutts"	Renee Palyo Mark Garabedian	April 27, 2006
Andrea Finds Out: Andrea follows Streaky into Krypto's clubhouse and finds out both superheroes' secrets. Meanwhile, Mechanikat creates a Dirtbot on Earth to steal jewels and uses green kryptonite against Krypto and Streaky. It is up to Kevin and Andrea to destroy the Dirtbot. Magic Mutts: The magician's rabbit Mertin the Magnificent is wreaking havoc at the fair. Things get worse when Krypto is caught up in the act as well. Ace has to retrieve Krypto and try to out-magic Mertin with the help of Stretch-O-Mutt.
31	5	"Reptile Round-Up" "Streaky's Field Trip"	David Teitelbaum & Jeff Elmassian Wendell Morris	April 28, 2006
Reptile Round-Up: When Ignatius gets bored, he clones himself with a new LexCorp machine. When the machine gets out of control and creates endless clones of him, Krypto has to fetch them all. Streaky's Field Trip: The Supercat Fan Club wants to go on a field trip with Streaky. The Penguin's birds, however, have other plans for the heroes.
32	6	"Pied Pussycat Piper" "Solar Specs"	Mark Garabedian	May 1, 2006
Pied Pussycat Piper: Isis steals a magic animal-controlling pipe and uses it to rob stores in Metropolis. When Ace and Krypto end up under her spell, Jimmy the Rat has to fight her off. Solar Specs: Mechanikat uses a satellite to manipulate the Sun's rays, creating red sunlight that depowers Krypto and Streaky. Therefore, it's up to Stretch-O-Mutt to stop him from invading Earth.
33	7	"Too Many Cooks" "Join the Club"	Story by : Len Uhley; Teleplay by : Rich Fogel Julia Lewald	May 2, 2006
Too Many Cooks: Mammoth Mutt, Tail Terrier, and Paw Pooch compete to become leader of the Dog Star Patrol when Brainy Barker gets knocked out by sleeping gas. Join the Club: Mechanikat sends Snooky Wookums in disguise to infiltrate the Supercat Fan Club and locate Krypto's clubhouse, but he soon comes to like his new friends.
34	8	"Bailey's Back" "Streaky's Inner Struggle"	Mark Garabedian Rich Fogel	May 3, 2006
Bailey's Back: Bailey returns to prove Krypto's secret identity as Superdog. Only this time, Andrea has to help Kevin keep the secret when he finds out about Streaky. Streaky's Inner Struggle: The Pleeks return to show Krypto and Kevin their latest criminal capture, named Plunk. When Plunk escapes and shrinks Krypto, a chase between them leads them into Streaky's body.
35	9	"Face Time" "Catopia"	Len Uhley Wendell Morris	May 4, 2006
Face Time: Krypto takes Stretch-O-Mutt to meet the Dog Star Patrol, but Mechanikat infects the latter with "space spots". He then attempts to take over their ship, but is unaware that his infection plan succeeded, so Krypto and Stretch-O-Mutt must convince him that it did not work and prevent his ship takeover. This is complicated by Mechanikat projecting Kryptonite rays over the ship before entering it, gradually reducing Krypto's powers. Catopia: Krypto is hit with a beam that makes him act and think like a cat. Streaky must find a way to change Krypto back, or else he will think he is a cat for the rest of his life.
36	10	"The Parrot and the Pirates" "Robbie's Return"	Mark Garabedian Joseph Kuhr	May 5, 2006
The Parrot and the Pirates: When a parrot named Blackbeak and his rat pirate crew cause trouble in Metropolis, Streaky and Stretch-O-Mutt team up to put a stop to them. It seems like an easy task, but Blackbeak's pendant holds a special power. Robbie's Return: Robbie the Bird Wonder returns from the south, only to get a jump start from Ace because his superheroics have not been doing well. Both Robbie and Streaky then notice that Krypto and Ace are missing, and team up to save them from Mechanikat and Isis.
37	11	"Revolt of the Beavers" "Invasion From the Planet Peanut"	Mark Garabedian John Loy	December 8, 2006
Revolt of the Beavers: While away at summer camp, Kevin overhears some beavers talking about conquering humanity. After following them, Kevin finds out that they are led by an alien beaver, Buggy, who is helping them build weapons out of trees. After being captured, Kevin contacts Krypto, who, along with Streaky, arrives to stop them. Invasion From the Planet Peanut: While Krypto is away, Streaky joins the Dog Star Patrol in capturing an alien elephant peanut thief.
38	12	"Mechani-Calamity" "Barrump Barrump"	Paul Dini Mosa Kaleel & Nancy Joslin Kaleel	December 12, 2006
Mechani-Calamity: When Mechanikat is rejected as a leader of a club over Glorg, he sets to capture Krypto with a powerful suit, luring him and Ace to a planet with green kryptonite soil. With Krypto's weakened powers, he and Ace must defeat Mechanikat's new makeover. Barrump Barrump: Brainy Barker arrives outside Kevin's house to tell Krypto that a new prankster/criminal is on the loose, so they try to guard a Timestopper, a device that freezes time. Meanwhile, Barrump Barrump tries to steal the Timestopper from Kevin, but Kevin uses it to his advantage.
39	13	"Iguanukkah"	David Teitelbaum, Jeff Elmassian & John Loy	December 15, 2006
Part 1: During the Christmas and Hanukkah season, Ignatius attempts to obtain a toy named "Chippy Snowchip", but ultimately fails as there is only one left at a store. Andrea feels sorry for Ignatius, so she considers inviting him to her Hanukkah party. Meanwhile, Krypto makes a group of snowmen, which unbeknownst to him are brought to life after some Chippy Snowchips fall into them. Part 2: After Ignatius unsuccessfully tries to get Chippy Snowchip, Krypto and Streaky find him and invite him to Andrea's Hanukkah party. They learn about the living snowmen on TV and realize that they are their snowmen, and Ignatius accidentally reveals that it is all his fault. Subsequently, it is up to Krypto and Streaky to stop them.

== Ending and broadcast reruns ==
Krypto the Superdog ended on December 15, 2006. Reruns were shown on Kids' WB as part of the then-new CW network's E/I requirement, but stopped airing due to Kids' WB opting to use Cookie Jar Entertainment's shows Will & Dewitt and Magi-Nation. Krypto was aired on Boomerang from February 5, 2007, for a duration of 7 years until January 3, 2014. The two-part holiday special, "Iguanukkah", aired on Cartoon Network, December 21, 2008 (as well as Christmas Eve and Christmas Day), as part of the all-day holiday specials marathon. It was shown on Boomerang. Overseas, the show aired on Boomerang in Australia and on France 3 (as part of Ludo) in France. The show began airing on Boomerang Latin America in 2014. In the UK & Ireland, the series, upon starting, aired on the CBBC Channel before later moving to Cartoonito, but as of November 2017, it appears to be no longer broadcast on that channel. Since September 2018, it started airing reruns on Tooncast in Latin America.

Beginning on February 7, 2026, Krypto the Superdog started airing on MeTV Toons.

== Home media ==
Warner Home Video released two DVD volumes in 2006 - each featured a few episodes from the first season; no further releases took place until September 2022 when the complete series was released on DVD. The series was recently added alongside other DC animated shows onto HBO Max, but currently only in Latin America.

Region 1
Title	Season(s)	Episode count	Release date	Episodes	Special features
Cosmic Canine	1	4	June 20, 2006	"Krypto Scrypto Parts 1 and 2", "Super Flea", "A Bug's Strife", and "Meet the Dog Stars"	"Krypto's Hideaway: Cool Guided Tour of Krypto's Spaceship, His Second Home", and "Unaired Promo Introduction to the Series"
Super Pets Unleashed	1	5	October 24, 2006	"The Streaky Story", "Diaper Madness", "Feline Fatale", "Dog-Gone Kevin", and "The Dark Hound Strikes"	"Power Up!: A Rrrrousing Rrrrundown of Krypto's Special Powers"
Complete Series	1–2	39	September 27, 2022	Includes all 39 episodes from the entire series.	N/A

== See also ==
- Road Rovers
