= Beppo (comics) =

- Beppo on the cover of Superboy #76, art by Curt Swan.

Publication information
- Publisher: DC Comics
- First appearance: Superboy #76 (October 1959)
- Created by: Otto Binder (writer); George Papp (artist)

In-story information
- Species: Kryptonian monkey
- Place of origin: Krypton
- Team affiliations: Legion of Super-Pets
- Notable aliases: Super-monkey
- Abilities: See list: Superhuman strength, speed, durability, stamina, agility, reflexes, senses, and longevity; Solar energy absorption; Self-sustenance; Accelerated healing; Super vision; Heat vision; Electromagnetic spectrum vision; Microscopic vision; Telescopic vision; X-ray vision; thermal vision; Invulnerability; Flight

Beppo is a monkey superhero appearing in American comic books published by DC Comics, primarily those featuring Superman.

== Publication history ==
Created by Otto Binder and George Papp, he first appeared in Superboy #76 (October 1959). He made sixteen appearances in Superman comics during the Silver Age of Comic Books.

== Fictional character biography ==
Beppo is a Kryptonian alien who resembles an Earth monkey due to convergent evolution. He was originally one of Jor-El's test animals and escaped the destruction of Krypton by stowing away aboard baby Kal-El's rocket. Upon landing, Beppo hopped out unseen and went off on his own for some months.

Due to Earth's environment and yellow sun, Beppo develops abilities equivalent to Superman. After seeing Kal-El, Beppo flies to Smallville and secretly causes havoc. Beppo accidentally sets off fireworks stored in Jonathan and Martha Kent's garage, which startle him and cause him to flee into space. At the end of the story, which is told in a flashback by teenaged Clark, the reader is informed that Beppo eventually returned to Earth.

Beppo later encounters Supergirl, who introduces him to Krypto the Superdog and Streaky the Supercat. Beppo goes on to join the Legion of Super-Pets.

Beppo was erased from existence following Crisis on Infinite Earths, which rebooted the continuity of the DC Comics universe, and did not appear for years afterward. He was later reintroduced to current continuity and went on to appear in Infinite Crisis, Final Crisis: Legion of 3 Worlds, and the 2024 one-shot Ape-Ril Special.

A separate character based on Beppo is introduced in the series Superman Unlimited; this version is an ordinary monkey who was enhanced with kryptonite injections. Beppo escapes containment and encounters Bibbo Bibbowski, who gives him the name Beppo based on his numerical designation, #06638. Read upside down, these numbers resemble the word "Beppo". Following the events of "Kingdom of Zod", Beppo has the kryptonite cleansed from his body, removing his powers.

== Other versions ==
- An alternate universe version of Beppo appears in Kingdom Come #1.
- An alternate universe version of Beppo appears in Tiny Titans.

== In other media ==
=== Television ===
- Beppo toys appear in the DC Animated Universe (DCAU) series Superman: The Animated Series and Batman Beyond.
- Chrissy Beppo, a character named after Beppo, appears in Superman & Lois, portrayed by Sofia Hasmik. This version is a human reporter.

=== Video games ===
- A character inspired by Beppo named Christopher Beppo appears in Smallville Legends: Justice and Doom.
- Beppo appears as a character summon in Scribblenauts Unmasked: A DC Comics Adventure.

== See also ==
- List of fictional primates
- List of fictional primates in comics
