= Captain Carrot and His Amazing Zoo Crew! =

Comic book series

The Zoo Crew
- The Zoo Crew as depicted in Captain Carrot and His Amazing Zoo Crew! #1 (March 1982), Art by Scott Shaw, Bob Smith, and Ross Andru.

Publication information
- Publisher: DC Comics
- First appearance: The New Teen Titans #16 (February 1982)
- Created by: Roy Thomas; Scott Shaw

In-story information
- Base(s): Follywood, Califurnia (Earth-C's version of Hollywood, California)
- Member(s): Captain Carrot; Pig-Iron; Alley-Kat-Abra; Fastback; Rubberduck; Yankee Poodle; Little Cheese; The American Eagle

Captain Carrot and His Amazing Zoo Crew! is a DC Comics series about a team of talking animal superheroes called the Zoo Crew. The characters first appeared in a 16-page special insert in The New Teen Titans #16 (February 1982), followed by a series published from 1982 to 1983. The Zoo Crew characters were created by Roy Thomas and Scott Shaw. Although the series, which was the last original funny animal property to be created by DC Comics, proved short-lived, it is still fondly remembered by many comic fans of its generation, and the characters appear occasionally in cameos in the mainstream DC Universe (this is made possible due to the existence of a "multiverse" in the DCU, which allows the Zoo Crew characters to exist on a parallel Earth).

== Publication history ==
The series was introduced in a 16-page insert in The New Teen Titans #16 (February 1982). The series was cancelled after 20 issues, with six issues still in preparation. These six issues were eventually published in three double-sized issues as Captain Carrot and His Amazing Zoo Crew! in The Oz-Wonderland War #1-3, with the indicia title Oz-Wonderland Wars (plural). The series did not, in fact, depict a conflict between the Land of Oz and Wonderland, which plotter E. Nelson Bridwell considered antithetical to Ozite politics, but rather depicted the Nome King retrieving the magic belt and using his powers against both Oz and Wonderland, with the Zoo Crew coming in as reinforcements against him. The series was praised for its artwork, by Carol Lay, for its close emulation of the work of John R. Neill and Sir John Tenniel, but the story, scripted by Joey Cavalieri, was seen by many to be too close to the plot of Ozma of Oz to reach its full potential. The series featured cameos from both Hoppy the Marvel Bunny and the Inferior Five.

A Showcase Presents reprinting of the entire series was slated for September 2007 but was postponed, along with several other Showcase editions, due to royalty issues in DC's contracts of the 1980s. The book was finally released in September 2014. After years of absence, the Zoo Crew was reintroduced in Teen Titans (vol. 3) #30-31 (December 2005-January 2006). In October–December 2007, a three-issue miniseries called Captain Carrot and the Final Ark featured the Zoo Crew picking up from the Teen Titans storyline.

== Fictional history ==
The origin of the team came about when Superman was investigating a strange phenomenon causing the citizens of Metropolis to begin acting like their primate ancestors. He determined the cause to be rays of energy originating from the planet Pluto. Flying towards outer space, he encountered an energy barrier around the Earth, but after noticing a meteor pass through unaffected, he grabbed the meteor and attempted to use it to get him through the barrier. When Superman and the meteor struck the barrier, they were both shunted into an alternative dimension of "funny animals", later designated as Earth-C. There, Superman met several of the world's residents, who gained superpowers after being struck by fragments of the meteor.

The animals and Superman soon teamed up to stop the source of the ray (which was also causing the denizens of Earth-C to behave like their non-anthropomorphic animal ancestors), which turned out to be the old Justice League villain Starro the Conqueror, a starfish-shaped alien, who was launching his de-evolution assault from the Earth-C universe's Pluto. After defeating the villain, the animals decided to stick together and form the Zoo Crew, and Superman returned home.

Unlike many superhero teams, the Zoo Crew initially had considerable difficulty fighting as a unit. For instance, they would often take on a foe in pairs, and find themselves interfering with each other and being put out of action as a result. However, as the series progressed, the Zoo Crew persevered to develop their tactics in order to become a coherent fighting force.

=== Earth-C ===
The various members of the Zoo Crew lived on a parallel Earth that, during DC's Pre-Crisis multiverse system, was named Earth-C. Earth-C consisted of a world where various anthropomorphized talking animals existed; the series featured many animal-themed pun names for real-world aspects. For instance, the Zoo Crew operated out of Follywood, Califurnia, a parody of Hollywood, California. Similarly named Earth-C cities include Gnu York (New York City), Tallahatchee (Tallahassee, Florida), and Loondon (London). Countries on Earth-C include Cornada (Canada), and the United Species of America (United States of America); the capital of the United Species was Waspington, D.C. (Washington, D.C.).

The President of the United Species of America was Mallard Fillmore (a reference to the 13th president of the United States, Millard Fillmore). Other famous figures of Earth-C included Liz Whaler (Elizabeth Taylor), Marlin Brando (Marlon Brando), Byrd Rentals (Burt Reynolds) and Rova Barkitt (Rona Barrett) – the last two of whom became members of the Zoo Crew as Rubberduck and Yankee Poodle, respectively.

Historical figures and events on Earth-C also parallel those of the real world, including the Second Weird War (World War II; Earth-C's version featured the U.S. and the Allies fighting the Ratzis (Nazis)) and President Abraham Linkidd (a goat, Earth-C's version of Abraham Lincoln), who was immortalized in the nation's capital in the Linkidd Memorial.

Earth-C's population also consisted of the various "funny animal" characters that appeared in DC Comics over the years, particularly those in such Golden Age and Silver Age DC titles as Funny Stuff, The Dodo and the Frog, Real Screen Comics, and so forth. One of those older characters, Peter Porkchops, was a member of the Zoo Crew itself as Pig-Iron. Fastback's uncle is Merton McSnurtle, a Golden Age funny animal superhero known as the Terrific Whatzit.

Eventually, readers (and the Zoo Crew) were introduced to the parallel Earth of Earth-C-Minus, which turned out to be the home of the Just'a Lotta Animals (a parody of the Justice League of America) and whose world was an all-animal reflection of the universe of Earth-One in the original DC Multiverse.

Following Crisis on Infinite Earths, it was stated that the universes of Earth-C and Earth-C-Minus were dimensions rather than universes, and thus were not affected by the Crisis. The miniseries The Kingdom presented Earth-C as a Hypertime reality.

== Zoo Crew reunited ==
In Teen Titans (vol. 3) #30-31 (December 2005-January 2006), the Zoo Crew made their first return appearance in some time, in stories presented as excerpts from a comic book story "Whatever Happened to Captain Carrot?" that Kid Devil reads in #30. In these excerpts, the Zoo Crew is shown to have mostly disbanded and now lives in a "darker" world than in their prior adventures. Little Cheese is dead. Yankee Poodle has lost her secret identity and is a fugitive from the law, accused of trying to assassinate President Mallard Fillmore. Fastback has disappeared, Pig-Iron and Rubberduck operate as underground superheroes against the current anti-superhero law, and Captain Carrot is in self-imposed retirement after the death of his partner, Carrie Carrot, at the hands of Armordillo and Frogzilla. The only Zoo Crew member prospering is Alley-Kat Abra, who has revealed her identity publicly and become a world-famous magician. The story is a parody of the grim and gritty trend most often identified with the late 1980s to early 1990s superhero comics, and it includes references to several of DC's own series (such as The Dark Knight Returns and Watchmen).

A new hero, American Eagle, overhears Pig-Iron, Rubberduck and Yankee Poodle at the scene of Little Cheese's murder when they decide to regroup to avenge him. Acting independently of them, he confronts Rodney and bullies him into becoming Captain Carrot again. The others are disappointed when Abra refuses to rejoin the team, but rejoice when American Eagle brings Captain Carrot back to them. Their investigation reveals that the crimes against their members are connected. The president bribed Alley-Kat-Abra to reveal all of the Zoo Crew's secrets to the government; she took the money and made herself rich and famous. She banished Fastback into the future, killed Little Cheese, and framed Yankee Poodle for the crime when she got too close to finding out what had happened to Fastback. When Alley-Kat-Abra is arrested for murdering Little Cheese, she tells them that she did it simply because she is a cat and cats hate mice. The Zoo Crew inducts American Eagle as their newest member and heads into the future to retrieve Fastback.

=== Countdown ===
The Zoo Crew returned in a Countdown to Final Crisis tie-in entitled Captain Carrot and the Final Ark #1-3 (October–December 2007). In the new DC Multiverse, the Zoo Crew resides on Earth-26. It is revealed that they enlisted the aid of Chip Hunter, Time Master in a successful rescue of Fastback from the future. They returned to their own time to find major changes. President Mallard Fillmore's bribing of Alley-Kat-Abra was revealed and he resigned in shame. Vice President Beneduck Arnold took over and promptly created the Collar I.D. Initiative (a parody of the Superhuman Registration Act storyline of Marvel Comics' Civil War crossover event), which required that all superheroes reveal their secret identities to the government and wear identity collars. The government immediately stopped funding the Zoo Crew, and they were forced to leave their headquarters and all of the equipment that came with it. The Zoo Crew officially resisted the Collar I.D. Initiative and refused to sign up, but continued fighting crime in secret.

The Zoo Crew members restored both their civilian and their superhero identities. Rodney Rabbit regained his status as a comic book artist/writer, but he had to stop writing Just'a Lotta Animals. Their attorney presented him with a cease and desist order, and he complied. Fastback started The World's Fastest Delivery Service. Rubberduck's acting career as Byrd Rentals was all but over, but he did get a reality TV show featuring him and other washed-up actors. The American Eagle continued his radio career as Johnny Jingo, "the radio talk show host with two right wings". Pig-Iron got a job working on an oil derrick, and Yankee Poodle became the highest-rated talk show host in the business after she was exonerated of all charges.

The Zoo Crew operated briefly in defiance of the new law in a battle with the Salamandroid (at a comic book convention where Roger Rodney Rabbit was on a writers' panel) and again when they learn of a threat to destroy Gnu York's greatest landmarks. Frogzilla reappears in a dumbed-down state and battles the Zoo Crew. During the fight, he swallows Pig-Iron. He is manipulated into vomiting Pig-Iron into a particular building, which houses a dimensional warp. The crash frees Alley-Kat-Abra from a netherworld. After defeating Frogzilla, Abra tells her former teammates that she was imprisoned there by Dark Alley, an evil version of herself created by the Just'a Lotta Animals foe Feline Faust. Dark Alley was the one who killed Little Cheese and framed Yankee Poodle for the crime. Pig-Iron vouches for her and tells them that she contacted him telepathically from the netherworld while he was in Frogzilla's belly and told him her escape plan. The team accepts her back as a probationary member until they are sure that they can trust her again and they promptly go to search for the Salamandroid's base under the ocean. Starro surprises them and uses his starfish duplicates to make them forget how to use their powers. Only Pig-Iron escapes.

Starro works with Rash Al Paca to flood Earth-26 so that he can rule it. After President Arnold reveals that the ID collars have eliminated the powers of every superhero on Earth-26, the Zoo Crew summons the Just'a Lotta Animals for help. Green Lambkin leads a JLA team to help. Unable to stop the flood, the animal heroes evacuate a number of Gnu Yorkers using an ocean liner called Boa's Ark as Pig-Iron stays behind battling Starro. Others combine their powers to transport the ship full of refugees to Earth-C-Minus. En route, the JLA encounters Muttron, Lightstray and Orihound of the New Dogs; while the two groups face off, the cruise ship is accidentally sucked into the New Dogs' Kaboom Tube and sent to New Earth. All of the passengers, including the Zoo Crew, are turned into ordinary, non-anthropomorphic animals. In the climactic battle in Final Crisis #7, Monitor Nix Uotan restores the Zoo Crew to their original forms.

== Team members ==
The members of the Zoo Crew include:

- Roger Rodney Rabbit / Captain Carrot: A rabbit from Gnu York and leader of the team, who is often called Rodney to avoid confusion with the title character of the film Who Framed Roger Rabbit. He possesses powers similar to Superman which are derived from carrots imbued with the meteor's energy. In his alter ego, Rodney was the writer and artist of the comic book Just'a Lotta Animals until it was cancelled after a copyright lawsuit. His Earth-26 counterpart is a member of the Justice League Incarnate.
- Felina Furr / Alley-Kat-Abra: A cat from Mew Orleans, martial arts instructor, and student of the mystical arts. She wields a magic wand that was originally a stirring stick before being imbued with the meteor's power.
- Peter Porkchops / Pig-Iron: A pig from Piggsburgh who was transformed into living iron after being struck by a meteor fragment and falling into a vat of metal in the steel mill where he worked. He was originally created for Leading Comics.
- Byrd Rentals / Rubberduck: A duck actor from Follywood, Califurnia who gained elasticity. His name is a parody of actor Burt Reynolds.
- Rova Barkitt / Yankee Poodle: A poodle and gossip columnist who gained the ability to attract and repel other objects. Her name is a parody of gossip columnist Rona Barrett.
- Timmy Joe Terrapin / Fastback: A turtle from the Okey-Dokey swamp who gained "superchelonian" speed. His uncle Merton McSnurtle operated as the Terrific Whatzit during the Second Weird War and participated in "Operation Overlard".
- Chester Cheese / Little Cheese: A mouse and student at Follywood High School who gained the ability to shrink after eating experimental lunar cheese. He later revealed his secret identity to the public and left the Zoo Crew to become a lawyer before being killed by "Dark Alley", an evil version of Alley-Kat-Abra created by Feline Faust.
- Johnny Jingo / The American Eagle: An eagle and radio host who operates as a vigilante by night and replaced Little Cheese following his death. He is the only member who does not have superpowers, though he does use gadgets similar to those used by Batman.

== Villains ==
Enemies of the Zoo Crew include:

- Dr. Hoot: An owl who uses various scientific gadgets to commit crimes.
- Amazoo: An android with the combined abilities of all animals on Earth C-Minus.
- Shaggy Dawg: A sheepdog.
- A.C.R.O.S.T.I.C.: A Cabal Recently Organized Solely To Instigate Crimes (as well as other variants designed to fit that particular acrostic), a secretive organization that plots to overthrow the American government.
- "Feathers" Fillmore / Brother Hood: A.C.R.O.S.T.I.C.'s shadowy leader, named for his black hood. He is President Mallard Fillmore's criminally adept brother.
- Cold Turkey: A turkey with weather control and "cold ray" devices; he calls his hoodlums "Snowbirds".
- Jailhouse Roc : A giant vulture who had been in jail since the late 1950s, until he is released to work for A.C.R.O.S.T.I.C.
- Melvin McMole / Digger O'Doom: A mole who gains tremendous strength after eating one of Rodney's cosmic carrots.
- Fennimore Frog / Frogzilla: Formerly a frog, he is turned into a giant form by A.C.R.O.S.T.I.C. as a means of seeking revenge against his old foe, Dunbar Dodo. Both Fennimore and Dunbar originally appeared in DC's "funny animal" title The Dodo and the Frog.
- Feline Faust: A cat sorcerer.
- Armordillo: A villainous armadillo from the "Lone Stork State" of Taxes with "nine-banded armor" and razor-sharp claws.
- Kongaroo: A kangaroo from Aukstralia who is transformed into a giant by A.C.R.O.S.T.I.C.
- Garrison Gorilla / King Kone: A disgruntled gorilla ex-employee of the Basset & Robins ice cream company who wears a refrigerated suit (à la Mr. Freeze), equipped with a gun that projected destructive blasts of ice cream.
- The Time-Keeper: A rotund bear who can manipulate time and space.
- The Salamandroid: A heat-based salamander android and creation of Dr. Hoot; a member of the anti-mammal movement in The Final Ark.
- Rash Al Paca: An alpaca and an Earth-26 analogue of Ra's al Ghul; he is working with the anti-mammal movement in The Final Ark to flood the world.
- Starro the Conqueror: A starfish-like alien who is an enemy of the Justice League of America. After a past battle between the JLA and Starro on Earth-One in the original DC Multiverse, a severed piece of Starro falls through a chartreuse hole and regenerates into a new Starro on Earth-C, although this version's motives and tactics differ from the original Starro.
- A. "Wolfie" Wolfe / The Wuz-Wolf: A wolf who was formerly Peter Porkchop's neighbor, Wolfe became the villainous character after acquiring a talisman that contained some of the steel that Peter had fallen into and given him his powers (thus containing some of the meteor fragment as well). He is Earth-C's version of a werewolf (depicted here as a human, a mythical creature on Earth-C); in this case, having suffered from the compulsion to eat Peter in his youth (which he got psychiatric help for), Wolfe acted on this impulse as the Wuz-Wolf and was left disgusted after the Zoo Crew managed to cure him.
- Alfred E. Newgator / Mudd: An alligator and distant relative of Fastback who went treasure hunting in the Okey-Dokey Swamp in 1923 and died when he stepped into a quicksand bog. Years later, a movie was shot in the swamp and a barrel of gloop makeup was dumped in the bog where Alfred's bones lay, creating a mud monster dubbed Mudd.
- Polly Wannacracker / The Squawker: A parrot rival of Rova Barkitt, Polly crashed into a radio broadcasting tower and gained a sonic scream.
- Salvador Doggi / Debbil Dog: A chihuahua painter who turned to dark magic to regain his creative spark, only to accidentally create an interdimensional gateway and was sucked into his painting. He spent the next several years developing powers to control the dimension and sucked in Alley-Kat-Abra to free him so that he could use his powers to turn the world into his canvas.
- Cheshire Cheetah: A British cheetah who gained superspeed from a constant diet of fast food. After failing to outrun Fastback, the Cheshire Cheetah attempted to escape via a stolen prototype jetpack, only to be blasted into space.
- Fatkat: A cat crime boss who wanted Chester Cheese to throw a basketball game. When he refused, Fatkat had Chester's father killed and him locked in his father's vault which resulted in Chester eating the moon cheese and becoming Little Cheese. Fatkat was eventually defeated by Little Cheese with help from the Zoo Crew.
- Starski N. Hatch / The Screeching Tire: A hamster piloting a giant wheel called the Treadnaught. He was a special effects technician for Steven Spielbird-Dog's movies and was mad that he never received any credit for it. Steven filmed his rampages and offered to make Hatch his next big star.
- Doc Bill Platterpuss / Power Platypus: A platypus stunt double, Doc was mad that Byrd Rentals was going to do his own stunts for his latest movie. He tried to get revenge by sabotaging Byrd's car but Byrd was able to save himself every time, thanks to his super powers. Rubber Duck easily foiled Power Platypus by leaving him clinging to a cliff.
- Slumberjack: A jackrabbit art thief, who claimed to be the world's slowest jackrabbit.
- Willy Wildebeest / Hairy Gnudini: A wildebeest bank robber and master escape artist with magical powers. He is eventually revealed to be a genie and sealed back in his bottle by Alley-Kat-Abra.
- Stanley Bruin / Solar Bear: A bear weatherman who could generate intense heat and blinding light after being struck by a magnified sunbeam. He blinded his viewers to rob them, but was defeated when Fastback caused him to overheat.
- Louie Landcrabbe: A crab real estate agent who attempted to buy the Zoo Crew's headquarters. After being rejected, he teamed up with Frogzilla to get revenge.

== In other media ==
- The Zoo Crew appear in Robot Chicken, with Rubberduck voiced by "Weird Al" Yankovic.
- The Zoo Crew appear in Scribblenauts Unmasked: A DC Comics Adventure.
