= Charlie the Wonderdog =

2025 animated superhero comedy film by Shea Wageman

- Directed by: Shea Wageman
- Written by: Steve Ball; Raul Inglis
- Produced by: Shea Wageman; Michael Balfry; Carson Loveday
- Starring: Owen Wilson; Dawson Littman; Ruairi MacDonald
- Edited by: Danielle Altura
- Music by: Petteri Juhani Sainio
- Production companies: Centurion Pictures; ICON Creative Studio
- Distributed by: Cineplex Pictures (Canada); Viva Pictures (United States)
- Release dates: October 24, 2025 (Poland); January 16, 2026 (North America)
- Running time: 95 minutes
- Country: Canada
- Language: English
- Budget: $20 million
- Box office: $8 million

Charlie the Wonderdog is a 2025 Canadian animated superhero comedy film directed, produced, and written by Shea Wageman. The film follows Charlie, a dog belonging to a young boy named Danny. Charlie is abducted by aliens, who give him superpowers, and he becomes Wonderdog.

The film was first released in Poland on October 24, 2025, and was released in North America on January 16, 2026. It received mixed reviews from critics and became a box office bomb, gross $8 million against $20 million budget.

== Plot ==
A little alien creature is accidentally launched into an escape pod and sent crashing to Earth, in the Mojave Desert in the year 1999, where it is discovered by a human scientist.

Fifteen years later, on his first birthday, Danny is given a puppy named Charlie as a birthday gift from his mother. Ten years later, Danny, an elderly Charlie, and the neighbor's cat Puddy are abducted by aliens and taken to be picked as a pet for an alien prince. When the prince refuses them all and tries to remove them by throwing them out the airlock, his mother, the Queen decides he is unworthy of a pet and sends them all home.

Charlie is rejuvenated to his youth and gains superpowers and the capability of speech. At the same time, Puddy discovers he too can speak, has gotten much bigger and has powers as well (telekinesis and enhanced intelligence) and begins bullying his owner, Otis, into submission. Charlie is told to keep a low profile, but is unable to stop himself from using his powers for good. Charlie is honored by the President, who uses Charlie in promoting a new brand of dog food.

When his favorite cat food brand is discontinued in favor of Wonderdog Dog Food, Puddy begins plotting against Charlie. Puddy discovers that contact with his enhanced DNA causes cats to gain speech and intelligence while humans mentally regress and behave like cats. He doses pet food with his DNA and feeds it to random cats, giving them speech and intelligence so he can recruit them.

Charlie is framed for an attempted theft of a valuable gemstone and placed on trial for larceny. He is found guilty and sentenced to house arrest and the public turns against him. Wonderdog Dog Food loses popularity, with Puddy convincing the President to rebrand it as Puddy Cat Cat Food. Puddy doses the pet food with his DNA with the intention of rendering humans subservient to cats.

Arriving at Puddy's warehouse, Charlie and Danny find Puddy's operation, where the pet food is being infused with enhanced cat DNA. Charlie immediately challenges Puddy while Danny faces Puddy's hench-cats and is helped by his mother, who shows him the pendant she found in a spaceship. Mom and Danny are taken hostage by Puddy's lackeys. Puddy touches the pendant, inadvertently activating a beacon that reaches the alien ship.

The alien queen emerges and demands from Mom where she got the pendant. Mom explains that she found one of the queen's ships and the alien critter that was inside it. The queen telepathically reads Mom's mind and is dismayed to learn that the critter died, leaving behind the collar and pendant it wore. The creature was Flopsy, the Queen's beloved pet, whom she had searched for years. Meanwhile, the Queen's son takes an interest in Puddy and chooses him as his pet.

The Queen uses her powers to undo all the chaos caused by her people on Earth, restoring the humans and cats to their normal selves, but depriving Charlie of his powers. Realizing this, and understanding Charlie has a greater purpose, Danny tearfully pleads on his behalf to the Queen to restore Charlie's youth and powers. Though the Queen initially declines, stating the natural balance must be preserved, Danny asks again, saying that Charlie is his hero. Humbled and impressed, the Queen agrees.

Sometime later, Otis now has a "lady friend", Charlie has been exonerated of the crimes he was framed for, and has built his own "super hangout" beneath his dog house. Danny assists him as his missions operator as they start their first mission together, with Charlie taking off to control a hurricane.

== Cast ==
- Owen Wilson as Charlie, a Golden Retriever, who gains superpowers, and the ability to talk, and becomes Wonderdog.
- Dawson Littman as Danny, a 9-year-old boy, and Charlie's owner.
- Ruairi MacDonald as Puddy, a villainous Maine Coon and the main antagonist of the film.
  - MacDonald also voices Cookie, a dog recruited by Puddy.
- Tabitha St. Germain as President Rose
- Vincent Tong as President's Aid
- Zac Benneth-McPhee as Otis
- Sebastian Billingsley-Rodriguez as The Alien Prince
- Elishia Perosa as Danny's mom
- Rhona Rees as The Alien Queen
- Shawn Youngchief as The Alien Head Commander
- Nicole Bouma as Influencer
- Caitlynne Medrek as Kitten
- Mathew Baldwin as Chief of Police

== Production ==
The film was directed, produced, and written by Shea Wageman, written by Raul Inglis and Steve Ball, produced by Jennifer Rogan and Carson Loveday, and executive produced by Michael Balfry, Carson Loveday and Bahar Dehghanian. On October 21, 2024, Owen Wilson was announced to be cast as Charlie the Wonderdog. The CGI animation was done by ICON Creative Studio. The film's production budget was roughly $20 million. The film was completed by Fall 2025. The production design was done by Geoff Taylor. The original score was composed by Petteri Juhani Sainio, with music being written by Bryan Adams.

== Release ==
On October 10, 2023, Cinema Management Group was announced to be handling the film's worldwide distribution sales at the American Film Market, with the film scheduled for release in the second quarter of 2025. However, on January 6, 2025, CMG filed for Chapter 7 bankruptcy, leaving the film's fate unknown. On July 13, 2025, it was announced that Global Constellation was handling international distribution sales. The film was first released in Poland on October 24, 2025. In November 2025, Viva Pictures acquired the U.S film distribution rights to the film. The film was released in North America on January 16, 2026.

== Reception ==
On the review aggregator website Rotten Tomatoes, 40% of 15 critics' reviews are positive, with an average rating of 4.9/10. Mike McCahill of The Guardian wrote that the film's script "has one solid, funny idea... but it gets squandered amid the usual frenetic set pieces, which zip into the eyes and immediately exit via the ears."
