= Terrific Whatzit =

DC Comics fictional animal character

The Terrific Whatzit
- The Terrific Whatzit (left) and his "conscience" (right). From Funny Stuff #6 (Fall 1945). Art by Martin Naydel.

Publication information
- Publisher: DC Comics
- First appearance: Funny Stuff #1 (Summer 1944)
- Created by: Martin Naydel

In-story information
- Alter ego: Merton McSnurtle
- Team affiliations: Flash Family; Legion of Super-Pets
- Notable aliases: McSnurtle the Turtle
- Abilities: Super-speed; Super-strength; Flight "Automatic conscience"

The Terrific Whatzit (real name: Merton McSnurtle, also known as McSnurtle the Turtle) is a superhero turtle appearing in American comic books published by DC Comics. DC's first talking animal superhero, the Terrific Whatzit first appeared in Funny Stuff #1 (Summer 1944) and was created by writer-artist Martin Naydel.

Natasha Lyonne voices the character in the animated film DC League of Super-Pets (2022).

== Fictional character biography ==
Merton McSnurtle is a turtle and shopkeeper who lives in the town of Zooville and is famed for his honesty and laziness. Wishing to see how such a person would handle receiving superpowers, otherworldly entitles called Prince Highness and Prince Lowness grant him super-speed, among other abilities.

As the Terrific Whatzit, McSnurtle removes his shell and dons a costume almost identical to that of the Golden Age Flash save that the lightning bolt emblem is replaced by a "TW" in a yellow circle. The name "Terrific Whatzit" stems from the fact that without his shell, it is hard to tell what kind of animal McSnurtle is.

McSnurtle's last Golden Age appearance as the Terrific Whatzit was in Funny Stuff #17 (January 1947), although he continued to appear as a civilian in other titles. His superheroic identity would not appear again until Captain Carrot and His Amazing Zoo Crew! #9 in November 1982, in which he is seen helping the Allies during the "Second Weird War". Additionally, the Terrific Whatzit is revealed to be the uncle of Zoo Crew team member Fastback.

== Powers and abilities ==
McSnurtle possesses super-speed, super-strength, and the ability to fly. Additionally, he is haunted by a ghostly "automatic conscience" that berates him unless he takes action against danger and can remove his shell.

== In other media ==
=== Television ===
- McSnurtle the Turtle appears in The Flash in two different forms. The first version appears in the episode "Revenge of the Rogues" as the childhood stuffed animal of Iris West. The second appears in the episode "Borrowing Problems from the Future" as a regular turtle that Harrison Wells gives to Barry Allen as a housewarming gift.
- The Terrific Whatzit appears in the DC Super Hero Girls episode "All Pets Are Off".

=== Film ===
Merton the Turtle / Terrific Whatzit appears in DC League of Super-Pets, voiced by Natasha Lyonne. This version is a non-anthropomorphic female turtle who acquires super-speed after being exposed to orange kryptonite and goes on to become the Flash's pet and a founding member of the titular League of Super-Pets.

=== Miscellaneous ===
- An unnamed turtle wearing the original Terrific Whatzit costume appears in DC Super Friends #14 as the adopted pet of Wally West / Flash.
- The Terrific Whatzit appears in the DC Super-Pets children's book Salamander Smackdown. This version is the pet of Barry Allen / Flash who wears a similar costume to him.
