= Supergirl (Kara Zor-El) =

Superhero appearing in DC Comics publications and related media

- Textless cover of Supergirl Rebirth #1 (August 2016). Art by Adam Hughes.

Publication information
- Publisher: DC Comics
- First appearance: Action Comics #252 (May 1959)
- Created by: Otto Binder; Al Plastino

In-story information
- Alter ego: Kara Zor-El (birthname) Adopted names: Linda Lee Danvers (Silver and Bronze ages); Kara Kent (Modern Age); Linda Lang (Modern Age); Kara Danvers (Rebirth, Infinite Frontier)
- Species: Kryptonian
- Place of origin: Krypton
- Team affiliations: Justice League; Teen Titans; Legion of Super-Heroes; Red Lantern Corps; Superman Family
- Partnerships: Superman; Batgirl (various); Wonder Girl (various); Omen; Streaky the Supercat; Comet the Superhorse; Krypto; Lois Lane; Jimmy Olsen
- Notable aliases: Supergirl; Flamebird; Claire Conner; Woman of Tomorrow; Kara Kent; Girl of Steel; Maiden of Might
- Abilities: Superhuman strength, speed, stamina, agility, reflexes, and durability; Heat vision; Wind and freeze breath; Solar energy absorption and projection; X-ray vision; Electromagnetic spectrum vision; Telescopic, microscopic, and infrared vision; Super-hearing; Flight; Invulnerability; Advanced Hand-to-Hand combatant

Kara Zor-El is the original superheroine known as Supergirl, appearing in American comic books published by DC Comics. She was created by Otto Binder and designed by Al Plastino. The character first appeared in the story "The Supergirl from Krypton" in Action Comics #252 (May 1959). She is the biological cousin of Kal-El, who went on to adopt the name of Clark Kent and the superhero identity Superman. Her father, Zor-El, is the brother of Superman's father, Jor-El. Born on the planet Krypton before its destruction, Kara shared the same fate as her cousin: being sent to Earth. She also possesses the same powers and abilities as Superman, a product of his Kryptonian physiology and exposure to Earth's yellow sun.

During the 1980s and the revolution of the Modern Age of Comics, Superman editors believed the character's history had become too convoluted, thus killing Supergirl during the 1985 Crisis on Infinite Earths event and retconning her out of existence.

DC Comics Senior Vice President Dan DiDio re-introduced the character in 2004 along with editor Eddie Berganza and writer Jeph Loeb, with the Superman/Batman storyline "The Supergirl from Krypton". As the current Supergirl, Kara stars in her own monthly comic book series. With DC's The New 52 relaunch, Kara, like most of the DC Universe, was revamped. DC relaunched the Supergirl comic in August 2016 as part of their DC Rebirth initiative.

In live-action, Supergirl first appeared in the film Supergirl (1984), played by Helen Slater. She later appeared in the television series Smallville (2007–2011), played by Laura Vandervoort, and Supergirl (2015–2021), played by Melissa Benoist, who also appears on other Arrowverse series. Sasha Calle appeared as Supergirl in the DC Extended Universe (DCEU) film The Flash (2023). The character appears in the DC Universe (DCU) franchise portrayed by Milly Alcock, debuting in the film Superman (2025) prior to Supergirl (2026), and will return to Man of Tomorrow (2027). The character has also appeared in numerous television animated series, including Superman: The Animated Series (1996–2000), voiced by Nicolle Tom and My Adventures with Superman (2024–present), voiced by Kiana Madeira.

== Publication history ==
=== First appearances ===
The Kara Zor-El version of Supergirl first appeared in Action Comics #252 (May 1959). Otto Binder wrote and Al Plastino illustrated her début story, in which Kara was born and raised in Argo City (unnamed until later issues), a fragment of Krypton that survived destruction. When the city is doomed by a meteor shower, Kara is sent to Earth by her parents, Zor-El and Alura In-Ze (the latter unnamed until later issues), to be raised by her cousin Kal-El, known as Superman. Supergirl adopted the secret identity of an orphan "Linda Lee" and made Midvale Orphanage her home. Supergirl promised Superman that she would keep her existence on Earth a secret, so that he may use her as a "secret weapon", but that didn't stop Supergirl from exploring her new powers covertly. Action Comics #255 published reader's letters-of-comment to Supergirl's first appearance; she had allegedly generated a sizeable and mostly positive reaction.

Supergirl, from her debut onwards, became a regular backup strip in Action Comics. She joined the Legion of Super-Heroes, like her cousin had done as a teenager, and in Action Comics #279 (July 1961) she was adopted by Fred and Edna Danvers, becoming "Linda Lee Danvers". Supergirl acted for three years as Superman's secret weapon. She was at last introduced by her super-powered cousin to an unsuspecting world in Action Comics #285 (February 1962).

During her first quarter of a century, Linda Danvers would have many professions, from student to student advisor, to actor, and even TV camera operator. She shared Action Comics with Superman until transferring to the lead in Adventure Comics at the end of the 1960s. In 1972 she finally moved to her own short-lived eponymous magazine, before DC merged its Supergirl, Lois Lane and Jimmy Olsen titles into a single anthology title named The Superman Family. In 1982 Supergirl was relaunched into her own magazine.

=== Death during Crisis on Infinite Earths ===
The death of Supergirl, featured on the cover for Crisis on Infinite Earths #7. Art by George Pérez.

In 1985, the maxi-series Crisis on Infinite Earths was conceived as a way to reduce DC continuity to a single universe in which all characters maintained a single history. Despite Supergirl's continued popularity and status as a central member of the "Superman Family", the editors at DC Comics and the creators of the maxi-series decided to kill Supergirl off during the Crisis. According to Marv Wolfman, writer of Crisis on Infinite Earths:

Before Crisis it seemed that half of Krypton had survived the explosion. We had Superman, Supergirl, Krypto, the Phantom Zone criminals, the bottled city of Kandor, and many others. Our goal was to make Superman unique. We went back to his origin and made Kal-El the only survivor of Krypton. That, sadly, was why Supergirl had to die. However, we were thrilled by all the letters we received saying Supergirl's death in Crisis was the best Supergirl story they ever read. Thank you. By the way, I miss Kara, too.

The idea of killing Supergirl was first conceived by DC's vice president/executive editor Dick Giordano, who lobbied for the death to DC's publishers. He later said he has never had any regrets about this, explaining, "Supergirl was created initially to take advantage of the high Superman sales and not much thought was put into her creation. She was created essentially as a female Superman. With time, writers and artists improved upon her execution, but she never did really add anything to the Superman mythos—at least not for me." The poor initial reception of the 1984 film Supergirl was also blamed by some sources.

In the 1989 tale "Christmas with the Super-Heroes", the soul of Kara appears to Boston Brand / Deadman, cheers him up, and then disappears from continuity until 2001 (see below).

Several characters unrelated to Superman soon took on the Supergirl persona, including the Matrix (a shapeshifting genetically engineered life-form that 'defaulted' as Supergirl), Linda Danvers (the result of Matrix merging with the dying Linda Danvers and becoming an Earth-bound angel of fire), and Cir-El (Superman's apparent daughter from a possible future).

A heroine resembling the pre-Crisis Kara appeared in Final Crisis: Legion of 3 Worlds #5, along with many alternate universe Legionnaires who were gathered to battle the Time Trapper.

=== Two Supergirls meet ===
Prior to the post-Crisis introduction of Kara Zor-El into mainstream continuity, the pre-Crisis Kara Zor-El made an appearance in Peter David's Supergirl: Many Happy Returns. The then-current Supergirl series, at the time starring Linda Danvers, was in danger of being cancelled, and David thought a story arc involving Kara Zor-El would be enough to revitalize the series. In an interview with Cliff Biggers of Newsarama, David stated:

Although it had always been in the back of my mind that doing a Kara-related storyline might be fun, the impetus at this point was, frankly, sales… I was trying to figure out who currently wasn't reading the series, and came up with two groups that we'd have a shot at getting: Those who'd become bored with the current storyline, and those who didn't accept any Supergirl save Kara. By doing 'Many Happy Returns,' I sought to pull in both potential audiences.

In the Linda Danvers' Supergirl series issues 49 and 50 (October and November 2000), the original dead Kara appears as Linda's "guardian angel". Then in issues 75 to 80, "Many Happy Returns", a young Kara appears from an earlier time long before the Crisis. The paradox becomes a moral crisis for Linda who tries to take her place as the Crisis sacrifice, living for years in a Silver Age universe where "no one swears, the villains are always easy to defeat, and everything's very, very clean", eventually marrying the Silver Age Superman and having a daughter with him, before she is forced to return to her universe by the Spectre when he reveals that her efforts to replace Kara as the sacrifice will not succeed. This run was illustrated by Ed Benes who had also illustrated Gail Simone's Birds of Prey which had a similar whimsical camaraderie between its female leads.

Linda's inability to save Kara, coupled with the loss of her daughter, is so devastating that it ends her own career as Supergirl. Linda leaves a note for Superman explaining that she feels that she has failed to live up to the standards of a true Supergirl and choosing to go somewhere she cannot be found. This story arc is commonly cited as one of the best Supergirl stories ever written. The series ended with issue 80.

=== Revival ===
After the launch of the Superman/Batman comic book series, executive editor Dan DiDio had been looking for a way to simplify the Supergirl character from her post-Crisis history; the simplest version, of course, was Superman's cousin. Jeph Loeb and editor Eddie Berganza found an opening to reintroduce the character following the conclusion of the first story arc of Superman/Batman. Loeb states:

It was the convergence of two trains heading on toward each other. I was working on the Superman monthly when Superman Group Editor Eddie "Extravaganza" Berganza and I were kicking around an Armageddon-type story where this giant asteroid from Krypton was making its way toward Earth, and somewhere out past Neptune Superman was beginning to feel it. We figured we could tie it into "The Fall of Luthor" since DC was very kind to let me both put Lex in the White House and figure out how to get him out. Eddie and I started giggling over the possibilities of there being "something" in the asteroid. Or "someone" in the asteroid—neither of us daring to speak her name, but we both knew who [we] were talking about.

The modern version of Kara Zor-El made her debut in Superman/Batman #8 (2004). Kara takes the mantle of Supergirl at the conclusion of the storyline. The Supergirl comic book series would later be relaunched, now starring Kara Zor-El as "The Girl of Steel". The first arc of the new series was written by Jeph Loeb and illustrated by Ian Churchill. Loeb would later describe the appeal of writing for Supergirl:

I love that she has all this power and has to learn what it is to be a superhero in the DCU," said Loeb. "It's one thing to try that with Manhunter (which is terrific), but when you have an icon like Supergirl trying to find her way and, at the same time, at a power level that we haven't even begun to explore ... it should make for a bitchin' good time.

As the character continued to be reinvented, steps towards regarding the iconic character were some of the most prominent changes. Artist Jamal Igle and editor Matt Idleson moved to transition the character away from red panties under her skirt to biker shorts, feeling such a change was a logical progression and "more respectable".

=== The New 52 ===
In September 2011, DC Comics began The New 52, a continuity reboot in which it canceled all of its monthly superhero titles and relaunched 52 new ones. One of the new titles was a new Supergirl series (Volume 6) that featured a new origin for Kara and was published between 2011 and 2015. Artist Mahmud Asrar designed a new costume for the character more closely resembling Superman's costume as opposed to her classic "cheerleader" suit, a change which generated criticism from some readers.

=== DC Rebirth ===
The 2016 DC Comics title relaunch Rebirth incorporates several elements (such as the costume, the name, the setting, and some characters) from the Supergirl television series. The DC Rebirth initiative undid the New 52's modern recreations, bringing DC's heroes back to their more classic iterations. Supergirl's new series (Volume 7) was titled Supergirl: Rebirth, written by Steven Orlando. The first arc was penciled by Brian Ching, who also redesigned Supergirl's costume in reference to a more classic look. In April 2018, it was announced that the title would be canceled after issue #20, only to be revived in August that year under a new creative team, with new writer Marc Andreyko and artist Kevin Maguire. The series ended with its 42nd issue.

=== Future State: Kara Zor-El, Superwoman ===
The Future State comics propose a possible future for Kara Zor-El, now an adult and having taken the alias of Superwoman. She leaves Earth to become a guardian of the Moon, which has become a refugee colony for aliens from the entire universe. The series was written by Marguerite Bennet and penciled by Marguerite Sauvage.

=== Supergirl: Woman of Tomorrow ===
Under the Infinite Frontier brand, Kara's next series Woman of Tomorrow debuted in June 2021, written by Tom King and penciled by Brazilian artists Bilquis Evely and Mat Lopes. The arc introduces Supergirl to new character grounds as she begins the story as a young woman, celebrating her 21st birthday and helping a young alien in her quest for revenge. The "mentor-mentee journey on revenge" plot is, according to King, inspired by the original novel and both versions of True Grit.

In this series, the creators paid homage to Linda Danvers, as Kara manifests flame wings and powers after taking a red kryptonite drug to save her space bus crew from a Karpane dragon.

=== Supergirl ===
In May 2025, a new Supergirl series was launched under the DC All In line, written and drawn by Sophie Campbell. Her arc now brings back pre-Crisis aspects and characters from her Bronze and Silver Age in DC Comics.

== Fictional character biography ==
=== Silver Age ===
In her debut story, Kara Zor-El is the last survivor of Argo City of the planet Krypton. Although Argo, which had survived the explosion of the planet, drifted through space as a self-sustaining environment, the soil of the colony eventually turned into Kryptonite; and though Kara's father Zor-El placed lead sheeting above the ground to protect the citizens from radiation, meteorites pierced the sheeting, and the Kryptonians died of radiation poisoning instead of replacing the metal.

In Supergirl's subsequent backup feature in Action Comics drawn by artist Jim Mooney for ten years until 1968, Supergirl adopts the identity of Linda Lee, an orphan at Midvale Orphanage presided over by headmistress Miss Hart. She disguises herself by hiding her blond hair beneath a brunette wig; Supergirl interacts with humans on a person-to-person basis performing good deeds and saving the world by helping one person at a time, and she also devises clever schemes as "Superman's Secret Weapon", saving him many times and avoiding adoption before Superman can introduce her publicly.

While temporarily powerless due to the scheming of Kandorian scientist Lesla-Lar, who is out to supplant her on Earth, Linda allows herself to be adopted by engineer and rocket scientist Fred Danvers and his wife, Edna. In time, she reveals her secret identity to her adoptive parents on the same day her cousin Superman finally introduces her to the world, in the finale of what was then, at eight chapters, DC's longest-running series, "The World's Greatest Heroine".

When frequent dreams about her parents being alive turn out to be real, she builds a machine aided by her engineer father's talent, and brings them both back alive from the "Survival Zone" where they had both teleported during Argo City's final moments. Zor-El and Alura eventually end up living in Kandor, and when the city in the bottle is enlarged, they both go on to live in Rokyn/New Krypton.

Graduating from high school in 1965, Linda Lee goes to college on a scholarship and stays in Stanhope College until she graduates in 1971. During this era, she is helped by her pet cat Streaky, her Super-Horse pet Comet, and befriends Lena Thorul, who had first appeared in the Lois Lane series. Kara is also a member of the Legion of Super-Heroes, where she becomes close to Brainiac 5. In addition, Linda has boyfriends from the orphanage (Richard "Dick" Malverne) and from Atlantis (Jerro the merboy).

In 1967, Supergirl meets Batgirl for the first time in World's Finest Comics. Developing a strong friendship, the two characters teamed up many times again, as in Superman Family #171, or Adventure #381. In 1969, Supergirl left Action Comics and became a featured character in Adventure Comics beginning with issue #381 (June 1969).

During the 1970s, Supergirl's costume changed frequently, as did her career in her civilian life. In her secret identity as Linda Lee Danvers, Kara Zor-El took a variety of jobs including graduate student in acting, television camera operator, and student counselor, and finally became an actress on the TV soap Secret Hearts.

=== Bronze Age ===
After longtime Superman family editor Mort Weisinger retired in 1971, the character underwent revitalization under editor Joe Orlando and artist Mike Sekowsky. Wearing a series of new outfits and leaving her adopted foster home with the Danvers family, Linda goes to San Francisco, where she works for KSF-TV as a camera operator and develops a crush on her boss, Geoffrey Anderson. These stories introduced Supergirl's most memorable villain from this period: Lex Luthor's niece Nasthalthia, or Nasty. Nasty had made two appearances towards the end of Linda's college years, then pursued her to KSF-TV, trying to secure proof of her dual identity.

Supergirl starred in her first solo eponymous monthly series from 1972 until October 1974, when her monthly title merged with Superman's Girl Friend, Lois Lane, and Superman's Pal Jimmy Olsen to produce a new series called The Superman Family, where she eventually became the steady lead story. Linda worked as a student advisor at New Athens Experimental School before leaving for New York to follow a career in acting with daytime soap Secret Hearts.

In 1982 Supergirl received a second monthly solo series titled The Daring New Adventures of Supergirl, relocating the character to Chicago as Linda became a mature student of psychology. Industry legend and former DC publisher Carmine Infantino provided the penciled art; Bob Oksner inked. With issue 13 the title was revamped, with a new costume design (sporting a red headband) and the title shortened to just Supergirl. The series ran until sudden cancellation in 1984, only two months before the character's debut in a big-budget Hollywood film starring Helen Slater.

In the Crisis on Infinite Earths (1985), numerous heroes from across the multiverse join forces to defeat the Anti-Monitor. When Superman comes face to face with the Anti-Monitor and is knocked unconscious, Supergirl rushes to save him before he is killed. She is able to fight him off long enough for Doctor Light to carry her cousin to a safe distance, but is killed by the Anti-Monitor. Afterward, Supergirl is buried on New Krypton and a memorial service is held in Chicago. When the universe is rebooted, the timeline is altered and all memory of Kara is erased. Kara's spirit appears in Christmas with the Super-Heroes and Peter David's run on Supergirl.

=== Modern Age ===
In 2004, Jeph Loeb reintroduced Kara Zor-El into post-Zero Hour (Birthright timeline) continuity during a storyline in the series Superman/Batman. She is the biological cousin of Superman, and although chronologically older than him, the ship in which she traveled to Earth was caught in a large green Kryptonite meteorite which held her in a state of suspended animation for much of the journey, making her have the appearance of a 16-year-old girl. Still, Supergirl sometimes saw Superman as a child, due to last carrying him as a baby. DC Comics then relaunched Supergirl, the first story arc of which was written by Loeb; it showcases Supergirl on a journey of self-discovery. Along her journey, she encounters Power Girl (Kara Zor-El's counterpart from another universe), the Teen Titans, the Outsiders, the Justice League of America, and arch-villain Lex Luthor.

During the company-wide crossover series Infinite Crisis (2005), a sequel to Crisis on Infinite Earths, Supergirl is transported to the 31st century, where she is revered as a member of the Superman family and joins the Legion of Super-Heroes. DC Comics renamed the monthly series Legion of Super-Heroes to Supergirl and the Legion of Super-Heroes. Beginning with issue #16. In the limited series 52, which chronicles the events that took place during the missing year after the end of Infinite Crisis, Donna Troy recalls the original Kara Zor-El and her sacrifice to save the universe. Supergirl returns to the 21st century during the course of 52. After briefly filling in for a temporarily depowered Superman as guardian of Metropolis, she assumes the identity of Flamebird to fight crime in the city of Kandor with Power Girl as Nightwing in Greg Rucka's arc Supergirl: Candor.

In 2007, Supergirl appeared in the miniseries Amazons Attack!. That same year, she joined the Teen Titans for five issues.

Kara Zor-El as Flamebird during the events of Supergirl: Candor. Art by Ed Benes.

Conversations with other heroes who maintain secret identities lead Kara to the conclusion that she needs to make a deeper connection with human beings. She accepts Lana Lang's proposal to present her to the Daily Planet staff as "Linda Lang", Lana's teenaged niece.

In the 2008–2009 "New Krypton" story arc, in which Superman discovers and frees the real Kandor and a large number of its citizens, Supergirl is reunited with her father, Zor-El and mother, Alura, though Zor-El is killed by the villain Reactron. When a planet is formed that the Kryptonians call New Krypton, Kara is torn between her life on Earth, and her obligation to her mother, eventually joining the New Krypton Science Guild.

Supergirl subsequently appears in the 2009 miniseries Justice League: Cry for Justice, and the 2009–2010 storyline "Blackest Night". The New Krypton storyline would later be resolved in the "World of New Krypton", "Superman: Last Stand of New Krypton", "War of the Supermen" storylines, resulting in the destruction of New Krypton and seeing Supergirl mourn her people.

Supergirl subsequently appears in the 2010 "Brightest Day" storyline, the follow-up to "Blackest Night"., where she joins the Justice League along with Jesse Quick and Jade.

=== The New 52 ===
In this continuity, Kara's ship lands in Smallville, but hurtles through the Earth and emerges in Siberia.

Kara has no memory of Krypton's destruction, and believes it is only three days since her spacecraft was launched. She learns the truth about Krypton's destruction from Superman, and later journeys through a wormhole to Argo City, which she finds in orbit around a blue sun. She finds the city in ruins, with no explanation of how it met that fate, and is attacked by a female Worldkiller named Reign before the city plummets into the sun. When Reign and her fellow Worldkiller plan to enslave the Earth, Supergirl returns there to defeat them, and thus adopts Earth as her new home.

After several battles with supervillains, including the Worldkillers, superweapons of Kryptonian design, she accepts Krypton's destruction, but continues to grapple with her grief. Her desire to restore Krypton results in her being manipulated into nearly destroying the Earth by another Kryptonian whom she falls in love with. Upon realizing his manipulation, she kills him by driving Kryptonite through his heart, and succumbs to Kryptonite poisoning.

Following her poisoning, Supergirl departs the Earth to die alone. While adrift in interstellar space, she encounters a planet under attack by monsters, and quickly intervenes to save them, unaware that the entire planet is a trap by Brainiac. She is captured and restrained by Cyborg Superman, but after a struggle, manages to escape both Brainiac and Cyborg Superman. Returning to Earth, she is sent into the past by the Oracle alongside Superman and Superboy, where she ensures that a resurrected H'el cannot save Krypton, and sacrifices the planet and her family to save the universe.

Back on Earth, she encounters the assassin Lobo. Initially eager for a peaceful resolution, seeing a kind of kinship with him in their both being lone survivors of their respective worlds (although not truly aware of Lobo's circumstances), Kara's encounter with Lobo would reveal deep mental wounds that attracted a Red Lantern ring to her. Driven insane by rage, Kara wanders space, attacking everyone in her way, until captured by several Green Lanterns and brought to Hal Jordan. Immediately recognizing a Kryptonian and unable to remove the power ring without killing her, he brings her to Guy Gardner, the leader of one of the two Red Lantern factions, who restores her sanity.

After some time under Guy Gardner's tutelage and protecting the galaxy as a Red Lantern, Kara is discharged from the Red Lantern Corps. On her way back to Earth, she encounters the leader of the Worldkillers, who are revealed to be parasitic suits of armor. He attempts to assimilate Kara as his host, but she voluntarily subjects herself to Kryptonite poisoning to stop him, and flies into the Sun, killing her and removing him from her body. However, Kara is revealed to be immortal while in the Sun's core and is revived, immediately destroying the Worldkiller. She later helps Guy against Atrocitus and his Red Lantern splinter group.

=== Convergence and return of the Pre-Crisis version ===
During the Convergence story arc, the original Kara Zor-El who had sacrificed her life during Crisis on Infinite Earths makes an appearance on the amalgamated planet of Telos. At the end of the saga she volunteers herself to once again fight the Anti-Monitor but this time, with the help of her timeline's Barry Allen, the Pre-Flashpoint Superman (in tow with his pregnant wife, Lois Lane), and a repentant Parallax (Zero Hour Hal Jordan), vows to defeat him for the sake of the multiverse's continued existence. Without it being seen, those left on Telos discover the group was successful and all previous timelines (with the mysterious exception of the pre-Flashpoint/pre-New 52 DC universe) from DC history had been re-established, though the fate of the original Kara Zor-El and her fellows went unmentioned.

A few more details of the battle against the Anti-Monitor are later revealed during the New 52 comic mini-series (leading into DC's Rebirth event). After the defeat of Anti-Monitor, Pre-New 52 Clark and Lois decide to start life anew in the closest universe they can find (mysteriously yet unable to see their old universe even though the rest of the multiverse had been restored) while pre-Crisis Kara Zor-El, along with her contemporary Barry Allen and Zero Hour Parallax/Hal Jordan, decide to find their place in the universe and go off to do so. Her fate as of that story arc is yet to be revealed.

=== DC Rebirth ===
After the events that led to the death of the New 52 version of Superman, 16-year-old Kara lives in National City with her adoptive parents, D.E.O. agents Jeremiah and Eliza Danvers, where she attends high school and works with the agency as led by Cameron Chase. As part of her civilian identity, Kara receives special glasses that darken her blond hair when posing as Kara Danvers. Kara also goes on an internship at Cat Grant's CATCO alongside Ben Rubel, whom she befriends.

In her opening arc "The Reign of the Cyborg Supermen", Kara discovers that the cyborg Zor-El, whom she had battled in her New 52 title, is still active and has rebuilt other Kryptonians (her mother Alura included), planning to take over Earth. Supergirl defeats them but vows to help her father regardless of his actions. After National City discovers Supergirl has kept Zor-El's "living" status a secret, they become mistrustful of her. Mister Bones takes advantage of the heroine's unpopularity and, after taking control of the D.E.O., sends villains in an attempt to bring Kara down. She defeats all of them and regains trust from National City with Ben's help.

=== The Supergirl Who Laughs ===
Kara is later infected by The Batman Who Laughs' toxin, causing her to turn evil and joining other infected as part of his Secret Six before later being cured. She is fired from CatCo by Cat Grant and starts working at S.T.A.R. Labs.

=== Woman of Tomorrow ===
Feeling lost and without purpose, Kara drifts through the universe with only Krypto as a companion. While celebrating her 21st birthday on an unnamed planet by binge drinking (the planet having a red sun that removes her powers and immunity to alcohol), she is approached by a little girl named Ruthye and is asked to kill Krem (her father's murderer) in vengeance. Supergirl refuses but, when she is about to leave the planet, Krem attacks and severely wounds both her and Krypto, fleeing in Kara's ship. Kara begins her journey alongside Ruthye and, powerless, saves her space bus crew from a Karpane dragon by taking a red kryptonite drug which causes her to manifest flame wings.

=== Supergirl ===
Protecting both Metropolis and the city of Kandor as Supergirl, Kara decides to return to Midvale. There, she is shocked to find that another female Kandorian named Lesla-Lar has assumed not only her previous role as Supergirl, but also her human identity as Linda Danvers. Kara joins forces with Lena Luthor to defeat her, at which point, it is revealed that Lesla assumed Kara's identity to find praise and a place to fit in, as she does not feel welcome or seen on Kandor. Kara agrees to help train Lesla as her own superhero, at which point, Lesla takes the superhero name Luminary.

== Powers and abilities ==
Kara flying. Art by Kelly Fitzpatrick and Joelle Jones.

A yellow sun gives her the powers akin to that of Superman. Like all Kryptonians under a yellow sun, the current version of Kara Zor-El possesses virtually unlimited strength, stamina, and invulnerability. She is able to fly with super speed which she can also use on foot like Superman but unable to match speedsters like The Flash (who are empowered by an interdimensional source called the Speed Force). Also like Superman, Supergirl possesses super senses, super-breath, and freeze breathe, as well as multiple forms of super-vision (including X-Ray, Heat, Telescopic, and Microscopic). Kara also has a bio-electric aura that enhances her near invulnerability and also protects her skin and her costume from dirt and tear; as such, Kara is perpetually clean. The Sun also provides Kara with a longer lifespan than that of a human being, to the point that she is effectively a biological immortal. Kara doesn't require food, water, or sleep to survive. She is also immune to most diseases, mental and physical, and would require a very strong strain to have a chance at affecting her.

In the rare instances that Kara is harmed by someone matching her strength or by the use of one of her weaknesses, she can heal almost instantaneously. Her power surpasses most other beings, though she can be overpowered by those who rival her strength such as Black Adam, Darkseid, Despero, Doomsday, Bizarro, Wonder Woman, and Superman.

Continued exposure to a yellow Sun will slowly increase her abilities. Many characters in the DC Universe have noted that Supergirl appears, at times, to be even more powerful than Superman himself. Superman himself states that this is because he has spent his entire life subconsciously suppressing his full powers to avoid hurting others, having been absorbing solar radiation since his infancy and raised to be considerate of how his power affects the environment around him. Kara, by contrast, has no such experiences or practice and so simply uses the full magnitude of her power.

=== Martial artistry ===
Unlike her cousin, Kara was old enough to undergo martial arts training as part of her citizenship tests, and at the Crucible Academy, gained a high level of mastery in various Kryptonian fighting styles like Klurkor and Torquasm Rao. Supergirl also learned the art of Bagua under I-Ching's instructions. She practiced how to manipulate her Chi or Qi to gain better control of her powers due to them becoming overwhelmed after her conflict with the Fatal Five. Superman recommended guardianship with I-Ching to Supergirl first. In addition to training in Krypton, Kara was trained by Batman in advanced martial arts and trained with the Amazons in Themyscira in unarmed and armed combat, Amazonas martial arts, fencing, Shield handling, and other Amazon weapons. She trained with Wonder Woman and Artemis extensively.

== Other versions ==
There are numerous alternate versions of Supergirl. The most notable is Power Girl (real name Kara Zor-L, also known as Karen Starr) who first appeared in All Star Comics #58 (January/February 1976).

Power Girl is the Earth-Two counterpart of Supergirl and the first cousin of Kal-L, Superman of the pre-Crisis Earth-Two. The infant Power Girl's parents enabled her to escape the destruction of Krypton. Although she left the planet at the same time that Superman did, her ship took much longer to reach Earth-Two.

She has superhuman strength and the ability to fly and is the first chairwoman of the Justice Society of America. She sports a bob of blond hair; wears a distinctive white, red, and blue costume; and has an aggressive fighting style. Throughout her early appearances in All Star Comics, she is often at odds with Wildcat because his penchant for talking to her as if she were an ordinary human female rather than a superpowered Kryptonian annoys her.

She also fought alongside the Sovereign Seven team, replacing Rampart after his death though that series is not considered to be part of canon in the DC universe.

The 1985 limited series Crisis on Infinite Earths eliminated Earth-Two, causing her origin to change; she became the granddaughter of the Atlantean sorcerer Arion. However, story events culminating in the 2005–2006 Infinite Crisis limited series restored her status as a refugee from the Krypton of the destroyed pre-Crisis Earth-Two universe.

Like the original Kara's Streaky, Power Girl has a cat, featured in a story by Amanda Conner in Wonder Woman #600.

== Reception ==
IGN also ranked this version of Supergirl as the 94th-greatest comic book superhero, stating "for a character born of the Silver Age that saw everything from a Super Baby to a Super Monkey, Kara Zor-El grew into something much more than simply another marketing ploy to slap an 'S' on." In 2013 IGN ranked Supergirl as the 17th-greatest DC comic superhero, stating "she was an early example of a female sidekick developing a large fanbase in her own right", and "Supergirl has been one of DC's most powerful heroes, and a standard to hold other female heroes against."

== Appearances ==
=== Pre-Crisis ===
- 1959 to 1969: Action Comics #252 to #376.
- 1969 to 1972: Adventure Comics #381 to #424.
- 1972 to 1974: Supergirl #1 to #10.
- 1974 to 1982: Her comic merges with Jimmy Olsen's and Lois Lane's to become Superman Family #164 to #222.
- 1982 to 1984: The Daring New Adventures of Supergirl #1 to #13, Supergirl (vol. 2) #14 to #23.
- 2015: Convergence

Kara Zor-El appeared in over 750 stories published by DC from 1959 to 1985.

=== Post-Crisis ===
- 2004 to 2005: Superman/Batman #8 to #13 and #19
- 2005 to 2011: Supergirl (vol. 5) #0 to #67
- 2006 to 2008: Supergirl and the Legion of Super-Heroes (Legion of Super-Heroes vol. 5) #16 to #37
- 2007: Action Comics #850
- 2008: Final Crisis
- 2011 to 2015: New 52: Supergirl (vol. 6) #1 to #40
- 2016 to 2020: Rebirth: Supergirl (vol. 7) #1 to #42
- 2021-2022: Supergirl: Woman of Tomorrow #1 to #8
- 2025–Present: "Supergirl" (vol. 8) #1-

Kara Zor-El also appears as a supporting character in several issues of other DC Comics, including Superman, Action Comics, Teen Titans, Amazons Attack, World War III, and Wonder Girl. She has also appeared in many issues of Superman, Action Comics, and Superman New Krypton starting with the World Without Superman event in 2009, and continuing with the World Against Superman event going into 2010.

== Collected editions ==
Listed in chronological order. All ages titles are not in continuity with the original or modern Kara.

Title	Material collected
Original
Supergirl Archives Vol. 1	Superman #123, Action Comics #252–268
Supergirl Archives Vol. 2	Action Comics #269–285
Supergirl: The Silver Age Omnibus Vol. 1	Action Comics #252–307
Supergirl: The Silver Age Omnibus Vol. 2	Action Comics #308–333, #335–340, #342, #344–346, #48–350, #353–354, #356–359, #361–372, #374–376
Supergirl: The Silver Age Vol. 1 (softcover)	Action Comics #252–284
Supergirl: The Silver Age Vol. 2 (softcover)	Action Comics #285–307
Showcase Presents: Supergirl Vol. 1	Action Comics #252–282, Adventure Comics #278, Superboy #80, Superman #123, 139, 140, 144, Superman's Girl Friend Lois Lane #14, Superman's Pal Jimmy Olsen #40, 46, 51
Showcase Presents: Supergirl Vol. 2	Action Comics #283–321
Bronze Age
Daring New Adventures of Supergirl Vol. 1	The Daring New Adventures of Supergirl #1–12
Daring New Adventures of Supergirl Vol. 2	The Daring New Adventures of Supergirl #13, Supergirl Vol. 2 #14–23
Modern
Superman/Batman Vol. 2: Supergirl	Superman/Batman #8–13
Supergirl Vol. 1: Power	Supergirl Vol. 5 #1–5; Superman/Batman #19
Supergirl and the Legion of Super-Heroes Vol. 3: Strange Visitor from Another Century	Legion of Super-Heroes #14–15, Supergirl and the Legion of Super-Heroes #16–19
Supergirl and the Legion of Super-Heroes Vol. 4: Adult Education	Supergirl and the Legion of Super-Heroes #20–25
Supergirl and the Legion of Super-Heroes Vol. 5: The Dominator War	Supergirl and the Legion of Super-Heroes #26–30
Supergirl and the Legion of Super-Heroes Vol. 6: The Quest for Cosmic Boy	Supergirl and the Legion of Super-Heroes #31–36
Supergirl Vol. 2: Kandor	Supergirl Vol. 5 #6–9; Superman/Batman #27; Superman #223; JLA #122–123
Supergirl Vol. 3: Identity	Supergirl Vol. 5 #10–19; Infinite Holiday Special #1
Supergirl Vol. 4: Beyond Good and Evil	Supergirl Vol. 5 #23–27; Action Comics #850
Supergirl Vol. 5: Way of the World	Supergirl Vol. 5 #28–33
Superman/Supergirl: Maelstrom	Superman/Supergirl: Maelstrom #1–5
Supergirl Vol. 6: Who is Superwoman?	Supergirl Vol. 5 #34, 37–42
Superman: New Krypton Vol. 2	Supergirl Vol. 5 #35–36
Superman: Codename Patriot	Supergirl Vol. 5 #44; Action Comics #880; Superman #691; Superman:World of New Krypton #6
Supergirl Vol. 7: Friends and Fugitives	Supergirl Vo. 5 #43, #45–47; Action Comics #881–882
Supergirl Vol. 8: Death and the Family	Supergirl Vol. 5 #48–50; Supergirl Annual Vol. 5 #1
Supergirl Vol. 9: Bizarrogirl	Supergirl Vol. #53–59; Supergirl Annual Vol. 5 #2
Supergirl Vol. 10: Good Looking Corpse (Cancelled by Publisher)	Supergirl Vol. 5 #60–67
New editions
Supergirl Vol. 1: The Girl of Steel	Supergirl Vol. 5 #0, #1–10, #12
Supergirl Vol. 2: Breaking the Chain	Supergirl Vol. 5 #11, #13–22; plus a story from the DCU Infinite Holiday Special
Supergirl Vol. 3: Ghosts of New Krypton	Supergirl Vol. 5 #23–33; Action Comics #850
Supergirl Vol. 4: Daughter of New Krypton	Supergirl Vol. 5 #34–43
Supergirl Vol. 5: The Hunt For Reactron	Supergirl Vol. 5 #44–50; Action Comics #881–882; Supergirl Annual #1 pages from Superman: Secret Files 2009
New 52
Supergirl Vol. 1: Last Daughter of Krypton	Supergirl Vol. 6 #1–7
Supergirl Vol. 2: Girl in the World	Supergirl Vol. 6 #0, #8–12
Supergirl Vol. 3: Sanctuary	Supergirl Vol. 6 #13–20
Supergirl Vol. 4: Out of the Past	Supergirl Vol. 6 #21–25, Superman Vol. 3 #23.1: Cyborg Superman
Supergirl Vol. 5: Red Daughter of Krypton	Supergirl Vol. 6 #26–33, Red Lanterns #28–29, Green Lantern Vol. 5 #28
Supergirl Vol. 6: Crucible	Supergirl Vol. 6 #34–40, Supergirl: Future's End #1
All ages
Supergirl: Cosmic Adventures in the 8th Grade	Supergirl: Cosmic Adventures in the 8th Grade #1–6
Miscellaneous
Adventures of Supergirl	Adventures of Supergirl #1–6
DC Rebirth
Supergirl Vol. 1: Reign of the Cyborg Supermen	Supergirl: Rebirth #1, Supergirl Vol. 7 #1–6
Supergirl Vol. 2: Escape from the Phantom Zone	Supergirl Vol. 7 #7–11, a story from Batgirl Annual Vol. 5 #1
Supergirl Vol. 3: Girl of No Tomorrow	Supergirl Vol. 7 #12–14, Supergirl Annual Vol. 7 #1
Supergirl Vol. 4: Plain Sight	Supergirl Vol. 7 #15–20
Supergirl Vol. 1: The Killers of Krypton	Supergirl Vol. 7 #21–26
Supergirl Vol. 2: Sins of the Circle	Supergirl Vol. 7 #27–33
Supergirl Vol. 3: Infectious	Supergirl Vol. 7 #34–42, Supergirl Annual Vol. 7 #2, a story from Superman: Leviathan Rising Special #1
Supergirl: Woman of Tomorrow
Supergirl: Woman of Tomorrow	Supergirl: Woman of Tomorrow #1–8

== In other media ==
=== Television ===
==== Live-action ====
- Kara Zor-El / Supergirl appears in Smallville, portrayed by Laura Vandervoort.
- Kara Zor-El / Kara Danvers / Supergirl appears in Supergirl and other media set in the Arrowverse, portrayed by Melissa Benoist.
- Kara Zor-El / Supergirl makes a cameo appearance in the Peacemaker episode "The Ties That Grind".

==== Animation ====
- Kara In-Ze / Kara Kent / Supergirl appears in series set in the DC Animated Universe (DCAU), voiced by Nicholle Tom.
  - First appearing in Superman: The Animated Series, this version is not related to Superman and originally came from Krypton's sister planet, Argo, which was knocked out of orbit following Krypton's destruction. Kara and her family placed themselves in suspended animation to survive the planet's gradually decreasing temperatures, but the stasis chambers failed over time, leaving her as the sole survivor. Upon discovering her, Superman brings her to Earth, where she is adopted by Jonathan and Martha Kent and becomes Supergirl.
  - Supergirl appears in The New Batman Adventures episode "Girl's Night Out", where she teams up with Batgirl to face the villains Livewire, Harley Quinn, and Poison Ivy.
  - Supergirl appears in Justice League Unlimited. As of this series, she has joined the Justice League before eventually joining the Legion of Super-Heroes in the final season episode "Far From Home".
- Kara Zor-El appears in "Smallville Legends: Kara and the Chronicles of Krypton", voiced by Laura Vandervoort.
- Supergirl appears in the "Super Best Friends Forever" segment of DC Nation Shorts, voiced by Nicole Sullivan.
- Kara Zor-El / Supergirl appears in Justice League Action, voiced by Joanne Spracklen.
- Kara Zor-El / Supergirl appears in Teen Titans Go!, voiced again by Nicole Sullivan.
- Kara Zor-El / Supergirl makes a non-speaking cameo appearance in the Young Justice episode "Death and Rebirth". This version was imprisoned in the Phantom Zone before being rescued by Klarion the Witch Boy and The Light, turned over to Apokolips as tribute and recruited into the Female Furies.
- Kara Zor-El / Kara Danvers / Supergirl appears in DC Super Hero Girls (2019), voiced again by Nicole Sullivan.This version is rebellious and is known as the "cool girl" at school. She can be jealous and doesn't like living in the shadow of her cousin Kal-El / Superman.
- Kara Zor-El / Supergirl appears in the Harley Quinn episode "Getting Ice Dick, Don't Wait Up", voiced by Lacey Chabert. This version is an ophthalmologist.
- Kara Zor-El / Supergirl appears in My Adventures with Superman, voiced by Kiana Madeira. This version is initially a warrior for the Kryptonian Empire and brainwashed servant of Brainiac, who she believes is her father, and to find her cousin Kal-El / Superman. Following encounters with Superman, Jimmy Olsen, and Lois Lane, Kara eventually breaks free of Brainiac's control and reunites with her cousin, being taken in by Jonathan and Martha Kent at the end of the second season. In the third season, Kara begins to adapt to living on Earth with her cousin, and she has a mutual attraction with Jimmy, who decides to separate from her for a while because he believes there might be someone more worthy. Dedicating herself to her work as a superheroine, Kara discovers that Jimmy was indeed interested in her when he confesses his feelings for her to Marina Maru. However, she decided to leave him in the friend zone until he was ready for their relationship and they also have Clark and Lois's new pet: Krypto.
  - In a potential future depicted in the episode "The Death of Superman", Kara cared for and protected her future nephew Jon Kent, the son of Superman and Lois, who were killed by Hank Henshaw, before being killed herself.
  - Additionally, a alternate universe version of Kara as Scion Kara appears in the episode "The Ex-Games", as part of the team by Ms. Gsptlsnz.

=== Film ===
==== Live-action ====
- Kara Zor-El / Linda Lee / Supergirl appears in a self-titled film, portrayed by Helen Slater.
- In August 2018, a film centered around Supergirl was announced to be in development, with Oren Uziel hired as screenwriter for the project. The studio intended to hire a female director, with Reed Morano—who has expressed interest in the project—being its top choice. Filming was expected to start production in early 2020.
- An alternate universe version of Kara Zor-El / Supergirl appears in The Flash, portrayed by Sasha Calle. Additionally, an CGI-based recreation of Helen Slater's incarnation of Supergirl makes a non-speaking cameo appearance.
- Kara Zor-El / Supergirl appears in films set in the DC Universe (DCU), portrayed by Milly Alcock. This version likes to party on planets with red suns where she can get drunk, and is Krypto's owner. She was born in Argo City after Krypton's destruction, and after losing her mother Alura because the city was poisoned by Kryptonite, Kara, along with Krypto, were sent to Earth by her father Zor-El to meet her cousin Kal-El as Superman.
  - Kara Zor-El makes an uncredited cameo appearance in the film Superman (2025).She arrives drunk at the Fortress of Solitude, taking Krypto, who was under Superman's care.
  - Kara Zor-El appears as the lead character in the film Supergirl (2026). Kara travels with Krypto to several planets until she encounters Ruthye Marye Knoll, the last survivor of her family, murdered by the Brigand leader Krem of the Yellow Hills. With Krypto poisoned, Kara confronts Krem to save her dog, allied with Ruthye and the bounty hunter Lobo. In the end, Kara and Krypto reunites with Superman, where she expresses a desire to stay for the long term, reaffirming that the planet Earth is now her home.
  - Kara Zor-El will appear in the film Man of Tomorrow (2027).

==== Animation ====
- Supergirl makes a non-speaking appearance in the ending of Justice League: The New Frontier.
- Supergirl appears in Superman/Batman: Apocalypse, voiced by Summer Glau.This version has been in suspended animation for decades, until she was found by Superman, until she was captured by Darkseid to be the captain of the Female Furies.
- Supergirl appears in Superman: Unbound, voiced by Molly Quinn. This version is from Kandor, which she and her parents escaped from before Brainiac shrunk and stole it.
- Supergirl appears in Lego DC Comics Super Heroes: Justice League: Cosmic Clash, voiced by Jessica DiCicco.
- Kara Zor-El appears in films set in the Tomorrowverse.
  - Kara as Supergirl first appears in Legion of Super-Heroes, voiced by Meg Donnelly. This version was sent to the 31st century to attend the Legion Academy due to her difficulty living on Earth. There, she comes into conflict with Brainiac 5, though they later reconcile and enter a relationship while fighting the Dark Circle.
  - Kara makes a minor appearance in Justice League: Warworld, voiced by Kari Wahlgren. She is transformed into the Harbinger in preparation for a coming "Crisis".
  - Supergirl / Harbinger appears in Justice League: Crisis on Infinite Earths, voiced again by Meg Donnelly.She sacrifices herself by becoming a bomb and explodes inside the Anti-Monitor when her friends put a hole in her torso.

=== Video games ===
- Supergirl appears in DC Universe Online, voiced by Adriene Mishler.
- Supergirl appears as an unlockable playable character in Lego Batman 2: DC Super Heroes, voiced by Bridget Hoffman.
- Supergirl appears as a support card in the mobile version of Injustice: Gods Among Us.
- Supergirl appears as a character summon in Scribblenauts Unmasked: A DC Comics Adventure.
- Supergirl appears as a playable character in Lego Batman 3: Beyond Gotham, voiced by Kari Wahlgren.
- Supergirl appears as a playable character in Infinite Crisis, voiced by Camilla Luddington.
- An alternate universe version of Supergirl appears as a playable character in Injustice 2, voiced by Laura Bailey. After being found by Black Adam and Wonder Woman, she is trained to help Superman's Regime. Amidst Brainiac's attack on Earth, Supergirl comes to realize Superman's tyranny and defects to Batman's Insurgency.
- Kara Zor-El as Supergirl and in her Red Lantern form appears in Lego Dimensions, voiced again by Kari Wahlgren.
- Supergirl appears as a playable character in DC Unchained.
- Supergirl appears in the PSP version of Justice League Heroes.
- Supergirl appears as a playable character in Lego DC Super-Villains via the "DC TV Super-Heroes" DLC.

=== Miscellaneous ===
- The Smallville incarnation of Kara Zor-El / Supergirl appears in Smallville Season 11.
- Supergirl appears in DC Super Hero Girls (2015), voiced by Anais Fairweather. This version is known for her kind, clumsy and "a-dork-able" nature.
- Supergirl appears in DC X Sonic the Hedgehog.

== See also ==
- Laurel Gand
