= Streaky the Supercat =

DC Comics animal superhero

- Streaky from the cover of Power Girl #5 (March 2024). Art by Gary Frank.

Publication information
- Publisher: DC Comics
- First appearance: Action Comics #261 (February 1960)
- Created by: Jerry Siegel; Jim Mooney

In-story information
- Alter ego: Streaky
- Species: Cat (with Kryptonian powers)
- Team affiliations: Legion of Super-Pets; Superman Family
- Supporting character of: Supergirl; Krypto
- Abilities: Kryptonian-like abilities: Superhuman strength and speed; Flight; Durability; Vision

Streaky the Supercat is a superhero cat that appears in American comic books published by DC Comics. He first appeared in Action Comics #261 (February 1960) and was created by Jerry Siegel and Jim Mooney.

He is Supergirl's pet cat who gained superpowers through exposure to X-Kryptonite; such as flight, super-strength, super-speed, invulnerability, and enhanced vision abilities, among other Kryptonian powers. His distinctive mark is a lightning bolt running along both sides of his fur. He is also a member of the Legion of Super-Pets, with other super-powered animals like Krypto, Beppo, and Comet.

== Publication history ==
Streaky the Supercat first appeared in Action Comics #261 (February 1960) and was created by writer Jerry Siegel and artist Jim Mooney. He was the pet of Supergirl, in her identity as Linda Lee.

== Fictional character biography ==
One of a series of superpowered animals, including Krypto the Superdog, Comet the Super-Horse, and Beppo the Super-Monkey, that was popular in DC's comics of the 1960s, Streaky was Supergirl's pet cat that was given super-powers by an unusual form of kryptonite.

In Action Comics #261 (February 1960), Supergirl was experimenting on a piece of green kryptonite in an attempt to find a way to neutralize its deadly effects. When her experiment failed, she tossed the kryptonite (or "X-Kryptonite", as it became known) out the window. Though her experiment failed, her pet Streaky came across the X-Kryptonite and was exposed to its radiation. Streaky gains powers akin to Superman and Supergirl, but on a lower level, including flight, super-strength, super-vision, super-speed, heat vision, and human-level intelligence.

Streaky made sporadic appearances in comic stories throughout the 1960s and even became a member of the Legion of Super-Pets, a group of super-powered animals.

Streaky's last pre-Crisis appearance was in Adventure Comics #394 (June 1970). When all kryptonite on Earth is transformed into iron, Streaky's X-Kryptonite power source is eliminated as well, causing him to lose his powers. In an answer to a reader's letter in Supergirl #2 (January 1973), editor E. Nelson Bridwell stated that the now-powerless Streaky had gone to live with Supergirl's foster parents in Midvale.

=== Post-Crisis ===
An alternate, grey-furred Streaky appears in Animal Man (1990) as one of the pre-Crisis characters who were returned to reality by the Psycho-Pirate's Medusa Mask. This alternate Streaky attacks Overman, an evil parallel universe version of Superman, with his heat vision before being hurled out of Arkham Asylum.

Various cats inspired by Streaky appear in the post-Crisis DC universe, but none of them possess superpowers. In Supergirl (vol. 4), a particular cat named Streaky, identical in appearance to the pre-Crisis version, jumps from a tree as if trying to fly before being saved by Supergirl and returned to its owner, saying the town of Leesburg is not "ready for a flying kitten". At the 2007 New York Comic Con, when asked if Streaky would return, writer Paul Dini said that the "cat's out of the bag".

In Supergirl #10 (2006), it is revealed Kara has a female pet cat. In issue #14 (2007), it is revealed that the cat's name is Streaky because "she doesn't get the concept of the litter box".

The original Streaky returns in Super Sons Annual #1 (2017). This version has traits of the pre- and post-Crisis versions, as Streaky is female but has the powers of the original. Streaky was a member of the Legion of Super-Pets (consisting of Krypto, Titus, Flexi the Plastic-Bird, Bat-Cow, and Clay Critter), but the group had a falling out when Clay Critter was killed in battle with Dex-Starr and Bud and Lou.

== Other versions ==
Alternate universe versions of Streaky appear in Supergirl: Cosmic Adventures in the 8th Grade, Tiny Titans, Superman Family Adventures, and Wednesday Comics. In pre-Crisis continuity, Streaky has a 30th-century descendant named Whizzy.

== In other media ==
=== Television ===
- Streaky appears in series set in the DC Animated Universe (DCAU).
  - An animatronic toy of Streaky appears in the Batman: The Animated Series episode "Deep Freeze".
  - Streaky appears in Superman: The Animated Series and Justice League as Jonathan and Martha Kent's pet cat.
- Streaky appears in Krypto the Superdog, voiced by Brian Drummond. This version is the pet of Andrea, the neighbor of Krypto's owner Kevin Whitney, and acquired Kryptonian powers after accidentally being exposed to a duplicator laser that copied Krypto's powers. Later in the series, he joins the Dog Star Patrol.
- An unnamed cat resembling Streaky appears in the Legion of Super Heroes episode "Message in a Bottle" as a resident of Kandor.
- Streaky makes a cameo appearance in the Batman: The Brave and the Bold episode "The Rise of the Blue Beetle!".
- Streaky appears in the "DC Super-Pets!" segment of DC Nation Shorts, voiced by Debra Wilson.
- Streaky appears in the Justice League Action episode "Unleashed".
- Streaky appears in Supergirl as an ordinary black cat that Supergirl adopted following her arrival on Earth.

=== Miscellaneous ===
- Streaky appears in the Krypto the Superdog animated series tie-in comic book.
- Streaky appears in Super Friends #14.
- Streaky appears in Capstone Publishers' DC Super-Pets book Royal Rodent Rescue, written by John Sazaklis and drawn by Art Baltazar.
