= List of Legion of Super-Heroes members =

The Legion of Super-Heroes is a superhero team in comic book series published by DC Comics. The team has gone through various iterations. Starting with the founding trio of Cosmic Boy, Lightning Lad, and Saturn Girl, all versions of the team include teenage superheroes from several planets and alien races. In some versions, the team swells to two dozen or more members, with different sub-groupings, such as the Legion of Substitute Heroes.

== Original team (1958–1994) ==
Introduced in Adventure Comics #247 (April 1958), the original version of the team appeared in various titles for 36 years until Legion of Super-Heroes (vol. 4) #61 (September 1994).

=== Founding members ===
| Character | Real name | Home world | Membership notes | Powers |
|---|---|---|---|---|
| Cosmic Boy (later Polestar) | Rokk Krinn | Braal | First appeared in Adventure Comics #247 (April 1958). Revealed to be a founding member in Superboy #147 (May/June 1968). | Magnetism manipulation; control and generation of magnetic fields. |
| Saturn Girl | Imra Ardeen | Titan | First appeared in Adventure Comics #247 (April 1958). Revealed to be a founding member in Superboy #147 (May/June 1968). | Telepathy; ability to read and control minds. |
| Lightning Lad | Garth Ranzz | Winath | First appeared (as "Lightning Boy") in Adventure Comics #247 (April 1958). Revealed to be a founding member in Superboy #147 (May/June 1968). Killed battling Zaryan the Conqueror in Adventure Comics #304 (January 1963). Resurrected in Adventure Comics #312 (September 1963). According to a later retcon, his body was resurrected housing the life force of Proty. | Electrical manipulation; control and generation of electrical fields. |

=== Silver Age members ===
| Character | Real name | Home world | Membership notes | Powers |
|---|---|---|---|---|
| Triplicate Girl (later Duo Damsel) | Luornu Durgo | Cargg | First appeared in Action Comics #276 (May 1961), already a member. Revealed in Superboy #147 (May–June 1968) to be the Legion's fourth member. One of her three bodies was killed by Computo in Adventure Comics #340 (January 1966). The Time Trapper killed a second body in Legion of Super-Heroes vol. 3, #50 (September 1988). This event was later retconned out of existence in Legion of Super-Heroes vol. 4, #42 (April 1993). | Ability to split into three bodies; reduced to two bodies after one of her bodies was murdered. Later acquired the ability to generate impenetrable force fields. |
| Phantom Girl (later Phase) | Tinya Wazzo | Bgztl | First appeared in Action Comics #276 (May 1961), already a member. Revealed in Superboy #147 (May–June 1968) to be the Legion's fifth member. Joined L.E.G.I.O.N. in L.E.G.I.O.N. '89 #9 (November 1989), and later assumed the code name Phase. Phase was retconned into a distinct individual in L.E.G.I.O.N. '94 #70 (September 1994). | Intangibility. |
| Chameleon Boy (later Chameleon) | Reep Daggle | Durla | First appeared in Action Comics #267 (August 1960), already a member. Joined the Batch SW6/New Earth team in Legion of Super-Heroes vol. 4, #41 (March 1993). | Shapeshifting. |
| Colossal Boy | Gim Allon | Earth | First appeared in Action Comics #267 (August 1960), already a member. | Ability to grow to gigantic size. |
| Invisible Kid | Lyle Norg | Earth | First appeared in Action Comics #267 (August 1960), already a member. Killed by Validus in Superboy and the Legion of Super-Heroes #203 (July–August 1974). | Invisibility to the naked eye. |
| Kid Quantum | James Cullen | Antares | First appeared in Legion of Super-Heroes vol. 4, #33 (September 1992). Joined prior to Brainiac 5 and Laurel Gand as ninth member. Joined the Batch SW6/New Earth team in Legionnaires #12 (March 1994). | Ability to cast stasis fields. |
| Star Boy | Thom Kallor | Xanthu | First appeared in Adventure Comics #282 (March 1961), already a member. | Ability to increase the mass of objects; for a time, had powers similar to those of Superboy. |
| Brainiac 5 (later B-5) | Querl Dox | Colu | First appeared and joined in Action Comics #276 (May 1961). | 12th-level intelligence. |
| Supergirl | Kara Zor-El (a.k.a. Linda Lee Danvers) | Krypton | First appeared in Action Comics #252 (May 1959). Joined in Action Comics #276 (May 1961). Killed by the Anti-Monitor in Crisis on Infinite Earths #7 (October 1985). | See Powers and abilities of Superman. |
| Laurel Gand | | Daxam | First appeared in Legion of Super-Heroes vol. 4, #6 (April 1990). Replaced Supergirl in continuity following the Glorith retcon. Died in Legion of Super-Heroes vol. 4, #59 (July 1994), from injuries sustained battling the Khunds. | Same powers as a Kryptonian, only vulnerable to lead instead of Kryptonite. |
| Superboy (retconned to be the Pocket Universe Superboy post-Crisis) | Kal-El (a.k.a. Clark Kent) | Krypton | First appeared in More Fun Comics #101 (January/February 1945). Joined in Adventure Comics #247 (April 1958). Died preventing the Time Trapper from destroying the Pocket Universe Earth in Legion of Super-Heroes vol. 3, #38 (September 1987). | See Powers and abilities of Superman. |
| Sun Boy | Dirk Morgna | Earth | First appeared in Action Comics #276 (May 1961). Joined prior to Adventure Comics #290 (November 1961). Killed by Circe (Note: Circe is not to be confused with the sorceress Circe, an enemy of Wonder Woman.) in Legion of Super-Heroes vol. 4, #36 (Late November 1992), in an act of euthanasia. | Heat and light generation. |
| Shrinking Violet (later Virus) | Salu Digby | Imsk | First appeared in Action Comics #276 (May 1961). Joined prior to Adventure Comics #290 (November 1961). | Ability to shrink to microscopic size. |
| Bouncing Boy | Chuck Taine | Earth | First appeared in Action Comics #276 (May 1961). Joined prior to Action Comics #287 (April 1962). | Super-bouncing. |
| Ultra Boy (later Emerald Dragon) | Jo Nah | Rimbor | First appeared and joined in Superboy #98 (July 1962). | Super-strength, super-speed, flight, invulnerability, flash vision, and "penetra-vision", only one of which can be used at a time. |
| Mon-El (renamed Valor following the Glorith retcon) | Lar Gand | Daxam | First appeared and sent to the Phantom Zone in Superboy #89 (June 1961). Joined in Adventure Comics #300 (September 1962). Freed from the Phantom Zone in Adventure Comics #305 (February 1963). Killed battling the Time Trapper in Legion of Super-Heroes vol. 3, #61 (June 1989). Revived in Legion of Super-Heroes vol. 4, #3 (January 1990). | Same powers as a Kryptonian, only vulnerable to lead instead of Kryptonite. |
| Matter-Eater Lad | Tenzil Kem | Bismoll | First appeared and joined in Adventure Comics #303 (December 1962). | Can eat any substance. |
| Element Lad (formerly Mystery Lad) | Jan Arrah | Trom | First appeared and joined in Adventure Comics #307 (April 1963). | Elemental transmutation. |
| Lightning Lass (also Light Lass and Pulse) | Ayla Ranzz | Winath | First appeared and joined in Adventure Comics #308 (May 1963). | Electrical manipulation; control and generation of electrical fields. Later gained gravity negation, then regained her original powers. |
| Dream Girl | Nura Nal | Naltor | First appeared and joined in Adventure Comics #317 (February 1964). | Precognition. |
| Ferro Lad | Andrew Nolan | Earth | First appeared and joined in Adventure Comics #346 (July 1966). Sacrificed himself to destroy the Sun-Eater in Adventure Comics #353 (February 1967), part of "The Death of Ferro Lad" story arc. | Ability to transform into iron, which also provides him with superhuman strength and invulnerability. |
| Karate Kid | Val Armorr | Earth | First appeared and joined in Adventure Comics #346 (July 1966). Killed battling Nemesis Kid in Legion of Super-Heroes vol. 3, #4 (November 1984). | Mastery of all known martial arts. |
| Princess Projectra (later Queen Projectra and Sensor Girl) | Projectra | Orando | First appeared and joined in Adventure Comics #346 (July 1966). | Generation of illusions. As Sensor Girl, control over all five senses of herself and others and some super-vision powers. |
| Shadow Lass | Tasmia Mallor | Talok VIII | Alternate version (known as "Shadow Woman") first appeared as a future deceased member in Adventure Comics #354 (March 1967). Canonical version first appeared in Adventure Comics #365 (February 1968). Joined in Adventure Comics #366 (March 1968). | Shadow generation. |
| Chemical King | Condo Arlik | Phlon | First mentioned as a future deceased member on the cover of Adventure Comics #354 (March 1967). Joined in Adventure Comics #372 (September 1968). Died preventing World War VII in Superboy and the Legion of Super-Heroes #228 (June 1977). | Control over the rate of chemical reactions. |
| Timber Wolf (later Furball) | Brin Londo | Zuun (also spelled Zoon) | First appeared in Adventure Comics #327 (1964) as Lone Wolf, created by Edmond Hamilton and John Forte; Joined in Adventure Comics #372 (September 1968). | Superhuman agility and strength. Later claws and fangs, super-senses, and accelerated healing. |

=== "Bronze Age" members ===
| Character | Real name | Home world | Membership notes | Powers |
|---|---|---|---|---|
| Wildfire (later NRG) | Drake Burroughs | Earth | First appeared (as "ERG-1") in Superboy #195 (June 1973). Joined in Superboy #202 (May/June 1974). | Energy blasts and manipulation, flight. |
| Tyroc | Troy Stewart | Earth (Marzal Island) | First appeared in Superboy #216 (April 1976). Joined in Superboy #218 (July 1976). | Sonic screams that create unusual effects. |
| Dawnstar (later Bounty) | | Starhaven | First appeared in Superboy #226 (April 1977). Joined in Superboy #229 (July 1977). | Interstellar tracking, flight, unaided space travel. |
| Blok | | Dryad | First appeared as a villain in Superboy and the Legion of Super-Heroes #253 (July 1979). Joined in Legion of Super-Heroes vol. 2, #272 (February 1981). Killed by Roxxas in Legion of Super-Heroes vol. 4, #3 (January 1990). | Superhuman strength and physical resistance; energy absorption. |
| Invisible Kid | Jacques Foccart | Earth | First appeared and joined in Legion of Super-Heroes vol. 2, Annual #1 (1982). | Invisibility to the naked eye and to most forms of detection. |
| White Witch (later Jewel) | Mysa Nal | Naltor | First appeared (as "The Hag") in Adventure Comics #350 (November 1966). Joined in Legion of Super-Heroes vol. 2, #294 (December 1982). | Spellcasting. |
| Magnetic Kid | Pol Krinn | Braal | First appeared in Adventure Comics #335 (August 1965). Joined in Legion of Super-Heroes vol. 3, #14 (September 1985). Killed by the Arch-Mage in Legion of Super-Heroes vol. 3, #62 (July 1989). | Magnetism manipulation; ability to generate and control magnetic fields. |
| Polar Boy | Brek Bannin | Tharr | First appeared in Adventure Comics #306 (March 1963). Joined in Legion of Super-Heroes vol. 3, #14 (September 1985). | Cold manipulation; ability to absorb heat and produce cold. |
| Quislet | Unpronounceable glyph | Teall | First appeared and joined in Legion of Super-Heroes vol. 3, #14 (September 1985). | Energy being who can possess inanimate objects. |
| Tellus | Ganglios | Hykraius | First appeared in Legion of Super-Heroes vol. 3, #9 (April 1985). Joined in Legion of Super-Heroes vol. 3, #14 (September 1985). | Telepathy and telekinesis. |

=== Post-Crisis on Infinite Earths members ===
==== Joined during the "Five Year Gap" ====
Many of these individuals were only depicted in flashbacks, and information regarding their tenure is limited.

| Character | Real name | Home world | Membership notes | Powers |
|---|---|---|---|---|
| Stone Boy | Dag Wentim | Zwen | First appeared in Adventure Comics #306 (March 1963). | Ability to turn into mostly inanimate stone. |
| Chlorophyll Kid | Ral Benem | Mardru | First appeared in Adventure Comics #306 (March 1963). | Ability to make plants grow super-fast. |
| Fire Lad | Staq Mavlen | Shwar | First appeared in Adventure Comics #306 (March 1963). | Ability to breathe fire. |
| Calamity King | E. Davis Ester | Touston | First appeared in Adventure Comics #342 (March 1966) | Ability to cause accidents and disasters. |
| Color Kid | Ulu Vakk | Lupra | First appeared in Adventure Comics #342 (March 1966) | Ability to change the color of objects and organisms. |
| Infectious Lass | Drura Sepht | Somahtur | First appeared in Superboy #201 (April 1974) | Spontaneous generation of infectious diseases. |
| Porcupine Pete | Peter Dursin | Earth | First appeared in Superboy #201 (April 1974) | Ability to generate and fire quills from his body. |
| Crystal Kid | Bobb Kohan | Earth | First appeared in Legion of Super-Heroes vol. 2, #272 (February 1981). First mentioned as a member in Legion of Super-Heroes vol. 4, #28 (April 1992). | Create crystal structures. |
| Nightwind | Berta Skye Haris | Earth | First appeared in Legion of Super-Heroes vol. 2, #272 (February 1981). Killed by the Khund army in Legion of Super-Heroes vol. 4, #15 (February 1991). | Ability to generate and control wind. |
| Lamprey | Tayla Skott | Earth | First appeared in Legion of Super-Heroes vol. 2, #272 (February 1981). | Ability to absorb electricity and breathe underwater. |
| Reflecto | Stig Ah | Rimbor | First mentioned as a future deceased member on the cover of Adventure Comics #354 (March 1967). First full appearance in Legion of Super-Heroes vol. 2, #277 (July 1981). Later depicted as the alternate identity of an amnesiac Superboy. Retconned as a distinct individual member in Legion of Super-Heroes vol. 4, #44 (May 1993). | Reflects physical and energy attacks back to their source. |
| Karate Kid | Myg | Lythyl | First appeared in Legion of Super-Heroes vol. 3, #13 (August 1985). First mentioned as a member in Legion of Super-Heroes vol. 4, #40 (February 1993). | Mastery of all known martial arts. |
| Visi-Lad | Rhent Ustin | Earth | First appeared in Legion of Super-Heroes vol. 3, #3. | Telescopic, microscopic, hypnotic and heat vision. |
| Impulse | Richard Kent Shakespeare | Earth | First appeared in Legion of Super-Heroes vol. 4, #12 (October 1990), already a member. | Super-strength, enhanced durability and speed, medical knowledge. |
| Echo | Myke-4 Astor | Calish-Aetia | First mentioned as a member in Legion of Super-Heroes vol. 4, #28 (April 1992). | Sound manipulation. |

==== Joined after the "Five Year Gap" ====
| Character | Real name | Home world | Membership notes | Powers |
|---|---|---|---|---|
| Kono | Brita An'nan | Sklar | First appeared in Legion of Super-Heroes vol. 4, #2 (December 1989); joined in Legion of Super-Heroes vol. 4, #12 (October 1990). | Mass-shifting powers allow her to turn herself and others immaterial or super-dense. |
| Neon | Celeste McCauley (a.k.a. Celeste Rockfish) | Earth | First appeared in Legion of Super-Heroes vol. 4, #6 (April 1990). | Imbued with ancient Green Lantern energy. |
| Reflex | Devlin O'Ryan | Xanthu | First appeared in Legion of Super-Heroes vol. 4, #6 (April 1990); joined in Legion of Super-Heroes vol. 4, #40 (February 1993). | Can reflect physical and energy attacks back to their source. |
| Veilmist | n/a | Khundia | First appeared and joined in Legion of Super-Heroes vol. 4, #44 (June 1993). Killed by Firefist in Legion of Super-Heroes vol. 4, #58 (June 1994). | Teleportation. |
| Firefist | n/a | Khundia | First appeared and joined in Legion of Super-Heroes vol. 4, #44 (June 1993). | Possesses cybernetically enhanced strength and speed and an arm-mounted blaster. |
| Blood Claw | n/a | Khundia | First appeared and joined in Legion of Super-Heroes vol. 4, #44 (June 1993). Killed in Legion of Super-Heroes vol. 4, #46 (August 1993) by Magnetic Kid's reanimated corpse. | Possesses superhuman strength and cybernetic claws. |
| Flederweb | n/a | Unknown (Note: Although initially believed to be a Khund, Flederweb's actual species and homeworld were never revealed.) | First appeared and joined in Legion of Super-Heroes vol. 4, #44 (June 1993). | Possesses cybernetic bat wings and the ability to adhere to walls. |
| Spider Girl (later Wave) | Sussa Paka | Earth | First appeared in Adventure Comics #323 (August 1964). Joined in Legion of Super-Heroes vol. 4, #54 (February 1994). | Super-strong prehensile hair. |

=== Reserve and honorary members ===
| Character | Real name | Home world | Membership notes | Powers |
|---|---|---|---|---|
| Pete Ross | | Earth | First appeared in Superboy #86 (January 1961). Granted honorary membership in Superboy #98 (July 1962), for protecting Superboy's secret identity without anyone else's knowledge (including Superboy). Killed by General Zod, Quex-Ul and Zaora in Superman vol. 2, #22 (October 1988). | None. |
| Kid Psycho | Gnill Opril | Hajor | First appeared and granted reserve membership in Superboy #125 (December 1965). Died in Crisis on Infinite Earths #3 (June 1985). | Psychokinetic powers which shortened his life with every use. |
| Insect Queen | Lana Lang | Earth | First appeared in Superboy #10 (September–October 1950); granted reserve membership in Adventure Comics #355 (April 1967). Killed by General Zod, Quex-Ul and Zaora, as revealed in Superman vol. 2, #22 (October 1988). | Ring enabled her to transform into insects or other arthropods. |
| Elastic Lad | Jimmy Olsen | Earth | First full appearance in Superman #13 (November–December 1941); granted honorary membership in Superman's Pal Jimmy Olsen #72 (October 1963). | Elasticity. |
| Green Lantern | Rond Vidar | Earth | First appeared in Adventure Comics #349 (October 1966); granted honorary membership in Adventure Comics #360 (September 1967). Revealed as a Green Lantern in Legion of Super-Heroes vol. 3, #50 (September 1988). | None. Later revealed to possess a Green Lantern power ring. |

=== Expelled members ===
| Character | Real name | Home world | Membership notes | Powers |
|---|---|---|---|---|
| "False Pretenses Lad" | Unknown | Unknown | Joined in Adventure Comics #327 (December 1964) under false pretenses to gain access to the Mission Monitor Board. | Unknown |
| Command Kid | Jeem Rehtu | Preztor | Secretly "demon-possessed"; joined in Adventure Comics #328 (January 1965) in order to dismantle the Legion. Resigned when the demon was exorcised, making him powerless. | Capable of inducing hallucinations. |
| Dynamo Boy | Vorm | New Tortuga | Joined in Adventure Comics #330 (March 1965) in order to infiltrate the Legion. | Used a belt to simulate energy generation. |
| Nemesis Kid | Hart Druiter | Myar | First appeared and joined in Adventure Comics #346 (July 1966). Revealed as a traitor in Adventure Comics #347 (August 1966) and expelled following that issue. Executed by Queen Projectra in Legion of Super-Heroes vol. 3, #5 (December 1984). | Spontaneously adapts powers to defeat any single opponent. |
| Star Boy | Thom Kallor | Xanthu | Expelled in Adventure Comics #342 (March 1966) for killing Kenz Nuhor in self-defense. Rejoined in Adventure Comics #351 (December 1966). | Ability to increase the mass of objects. |

=== Batch SW6/New Earth team ===
Introduced in Legion of Super-Heroes vol. 4, #24 (December 1991), "Batch SW6" included teenage versions of the original Legion (whose members had all reached adulthood), which appeared in the original continuity until Legion of Super-Heroes vol. 4, #61 (September 1994). Batch SW6's roster was equivalent to the original Legion's membership immediately following the team's first encounter with Universo, (Note: The Legion first battled Universo in Adventure Comics #349 (October 1966). In the following issue, Star Boy and Dream Girl rejoined the team under the aliases "Sir Prize" and "Miss Terious", but the two are not included in Batch SW6.) with Valor and Laurel Gand replacing Superboy, Mon-El and Supergirl (and with all three of Triplicate Girl's bodies intact). The members of this team were shown to be temporal duplicates of the original Legionnaires created by the Time Trapper. Additionally, five non-SW6 members joined: Computo (Danielle Foccart), Dragonmage, Catspaw, Kid Quantum, and Reep Daggle (Chameleon).

| Character | Real name | Home world | Membership notes | Powers |
|---|---|---|---|---|
| Cosmic Boy | Rokk Krinn | Braal | Introduced in Legion of Super-Heroes vol. 4, #24 (December 1991). | Magnetism manipulation; control and generation of magnetic fields. |
| Live Wire (formerly Lightning Lad) | Garth Ranzz | Winath | Introduced in Legion of Super-Heroes vol. 4, #24 (December 1991). | Electrical manipulation; control and generation of electrical fields. |
| Saturn Girl | Imra Ardeen | Titan | Introduced in Legion of Super-Heroes vol. 4, #24 (December 1991). | Telepathy; ability to read and control minds. |
| Triad (formerly Triplicate Girl) | Luornu Durgo | Cargg | Introduced in Legion of Super-Heroes vol. 4, #24 (December 1991). | Ability to split into three bodies. |
| Apparition (formerly Phantom Girl) | Tinya Wazzo | Bgztl | Introduced in Legion of Super-Heroes vol. 4, #24 (December 1991). | Intangibility. |
| Leviathan (formerly Colossal Boy) | Gim Allon | Earth | Introduced in Legion of Super-Heroes vol. 4, #24 (December 1991). | Ability to grow to gigantic size. |
| Invisible Kid | Lyle Norg | Earth | Introduced in Legion of Super-Heroes vol. 4, #24 (December 1991). | Invisibility to the naked eye. |
| Brainiac 5 | Querl Dox | Colu | Introduced in Legion of Super-Heroes vol. 4, #24 (December 1991). | 12th-level intelligence. |
| Andromeda | Laurel Gand | Daxam | Introduced in Legion of Super-Heroes vol. 4, #24 (December 1991). | See Powers and abilities of Superman, but with vulnerability to lead instead of kryptonite. |
| Inferno (formerly Sun Boy) | Dirk Morgna | Earth | Introduced in Legion of Super-Heroes vol. 4, #24 (December 1991). | Heat and light generation. |
| Shrinking Violet | Salu Digby | Imsk | Introduced in Legion of Super-Heroes vol. 4, #24 (December 1991). | Ability to shrink to microscopic size. |
| Ultra Boy | Jo Nah | Rimbor | Introduced in Legion of Super-Heroes vol. 4, #24 (December 1991). | Super-strength, super-speed, flight, invulnerability, flash vision, and "penetra-vision" (all approximately at Kryptonian power levels), only one of which can be used at a time. |
| Matter-Eater Lad | Tenzil Kem | Bismoll | Introduced in Legion of Super-Heroes vol. 4, #24 (December 1991). | Can eat any substance. |
| Alchemist (formerly Element Lad) | Jan Arrah | Trom | Introduced in Legion of Super-Heroes vol. 4, #24 (December 1991). | Elemental transmutation. |
| Gossamer (formerly Lightning Lass and Light Lass) | Ayla Ranzz | Winath | Introduced in Legion of Super-Heroes vol. 4, #24 (December 1991). | Gravity negation (formerly electrical manipulation; control and generation of electrical fields). |
| Ferro (formerly Ferro Lad) | Andrew Nolan | Earth | Introduced in Legion of Super-Heroes vol. 4, #24 (December 1991). | Ability to transform into iron, which also provides him with superhuman strength and invulnerability. |
| Princess Projectra | Projectra Wind'zzor | Orando | Introduced in Legion of Super-Heroes vol. 4, #24 (December 1991). Killed fighting Dominion troops in Legion of Super-Heroes vol. 4, #32 (August 1992). | Generation of illusions. |
| Chameleon Boy | Reep Daggle | Durla | Introduced in Legion of Super-Heroes vol. 4, #24 (December 1991). Killed fighting Dominion troops in Legion of Super-Heroes vol. 4, #32 (August 1992). | Shapeshifting. |
| Karate Kid | Val Armorr | Earth | Introduced in Legion of Super-Heroes vol. 4, #24 (December 1991). Killed fighting Dominion troops in Legion of Super-Heroes vol. 4, #32 (August 1992). | Mastery of all known martial arts. |
| Valor | Lar Gand | Daxam | Introduced in Legion of Super-Heroes vol. 4, #24 (December 1991). Disappeared into the timestream in Legion of Super-Heroes vol. 4, #37 (Early December 1992). Replaced his deceased 20th century counterpart in Valor #19 (May 1994). | Same powers as a Kryptonian, but with vulnerability to lead instead of kryptonite. |
| Chameleon (formerly Chameleon Boy) | Reep Daggle | Durla | Adult version of Chameleon Boy; first appeared in Action Comics #267 (August 1960). Joined the Batch SW6/New Earth team in Legion of Super-Heroes vol. 4, #41 (March 1993). | Shapeshifting. |
| Catspaw | April Dumaka | Earth | Introduced in Legion of Super-Heroes vol. 4, #33 (September 1992). Joined in Legion of Super-Heroes vol. 4, #41 (March 1993). | Cat-like abilities and physique. |
| Dragonmage | Xao Jin | New Shanghai Colony | Introduced in Legion of Super-Heroes vol. 4, #33 (September 1992). Joined in Legion of Super-Heroes vol. 4, #41 (March 1993). | Spellcasting. |
| Kid Quantum | "James Cullen" | Antares | Introduced in Legion of Super-Heroes vol. 4, #33 (September 1992). Joined the Batch SW6/New Earth team in Legionnaires #12 (March 1994). | Ability to cast stasis fields. |
| Computo | Danielle Foccart | Earth | First appeared in Legion of Super-Heroes vol. 2, Annual #1 (1982). Joined in Legion of Super-Heroes vol. 4, #41 (March 1993). | Can interface with computers and machinery. |
| Bouncing Boy | Chuck Taine | Earth | Zero Hour blip. Appeared in Legionnaires #16 (July 1994). | Super-bouncing. |
| Star Boy | Thom Kallor | Xanthu | Zero Hour blip. Appeared in Legionnaires #16 (July 1994). | Ability to increase the mass of objects. |
| Dream Girl | Nura Nal | Naltor | Zero Hour blip. Appeared in Legionnaires #16 (July 1994). | Precognition. |

== Reboot members (1994–2004) ==
The 1994 version of the Legion emerged in the aftermath of Zero Hour, and first appeared in Legion of Super-Heroes vol. 4, #0 (October 1994). It was revealed in Infinite Crisis #6 (May 2006) that this version of the team inhabits Earth-247.

=== Founding members ===
| Character | Real name | Home world | Membership notes | Powers |
|---|---|---|---|---|
| Cosmic Boy | Rokk Krinn | Braal | Co-founded the team in Legion of Super-Heroes vol. 4, #0 (October 1994). | Magnetism manipulation; control and generation of magnetic fields. |
| Saturn Girl | Imra Ardeen | Titan | Co-founded the team in Legion of Super-Heroes vol. 4, #0 (October 1994). | Telepathy; ability to read and control minds. |
| Live Wire | Garth Ranzz | Winath | Reboot counterpart of Lightning Lad. Co-founded the team in Legion of Super-Heroes vol. 4, #0 (October 1994). Killed fighting Element Lad in Legion Lost #12 (April 2001); Resurrected in Element Lad's body in The Legion #25 (December 2003). Restored to his original body in Final Crisis: Legion of 3 Worlds #3 (April 2009). | Electrical manipulation; control and generation of electrical fields. |

=== Pre-draft ===
| Character | Real name | Home world | Membership notes | Powers |
|---|---|---|---|---|
| Triad | Luornu Durgo | Cargg | Reboot counterpart of Triplicate Girl. Joined in Legionnaires #0 (October 1994). | Ability to split into three bodies. |
| Apparition | Tinya Wazzo | Bzgtl | Reboot counterpart of Phantom Girl. Joined in Legionnaires #0 (October 1994). Revealed in Legion of Super-Heroes vol. 4, #100 (January 1998) to be half carggite, and that one of her other two bodies was Phase from L.E.G.I.O.N. Apparition and Phase merged in the same issue. | Intangibility. |

=== Draftees ===
| Character | Real name | Home world | Membership notes | Powers |
|---|---|---|---|---|
| Chameleon | Reep Daggle | Durla | Reboot counterpart of Chameleon Boy. Joined in Legion of Super-Heroes vol. 4, #62 (November 1994). | Shapeshifting. |
| XS | Jenni Ognats | Aarok | First appeared in Legionnaires #0 (October 1994); granddaughter of Barry Allen and first cousin of Bart Allen. Joined in Legion of Super-Heroes vol. 4, #62 (November 1994). Native of the same universe as the post-Infinite Crisis team, as revealed in Final Crisis: Legion of 3 Worlds #3 (April 2009). Joined the post-Infinite Crisis team in Final Crisis: Legion of 3 Worlds #5 (July 2009). | Superspeed. |
| Leviathan I | Gim Allon | Earth | Reboot counterpart of Colossal Boy. Joined in Legion of Super-Heroes vol. 4, #62 (November 1994). Killed battling Dr. Regulus in Legion of Super-Heroes vol. 4, #83 (August 1996). | Ability to grow to gigantic size. |
| Kid Quantum I | James Cullen | Xanthu | Joined in Legion of Super-Heroes vol. 4, #62 (November 1994); killed in the same issue by Tangleweb. | Ability to cast stasis fields using belt. |
| Invisible Kid | Lyle Norg | Earth | Joined in Legion of Super-Heroes vol. 4, #62 (November 1994). | Invisibility to the naked eye. |
| Brainiac 5 (later Brainiac 5.1) | Querl Dox | Colu | Joined in Legion of Super-Heroes vol. 4, #63 (December 1994). | 12th-level intelligence. |
| Spark | Ayla Ranzz | Winath | Reboot counterpart of Lightning Lass/Light Lass. Joined in Legion of Super-Heroes vol. 4, #64 (January 1995). | Electrical manipulation. Later gravity negation, then regained her original powers. |
| Andromeda | Laurel Gand | Daxam | Joined in Legion of Super-Heroes vol. 4, #66 (March 1995). | See Powers and abilities of Superman, but vulnerable to lead instead of kryptonite. Later gained energy generation abilities. |
| Violet (also Shrinking Violet, LeViathan, Leviathan) | Salu Digby | Imsk | Joined in Legion of Super-Heroes vol. 4, #66 (March 1995). | Ability to shrink to microscopic size. Later gained Leviathan's power to grow in size. |
| Kinetix | Zoe Saugin | Aleph | First appeared and joined in Legion of Super-Heroes vol. 4, #66 (March 1995). Killed by Superboy-Prime in Final Crisis: Legion of 3 Worlds #4 (April 2009). | Ability to control the molecular structure of objects, enabling her to animate and reshape them. Later changed into a Terrorform, after which her powers were vaguely defined. |
| Gates | Ti'julk Mr'asz | Vyrga | First appeared in Legion of Super-Heroes vol. 4, #66 (March 1995). Joined in Legion of Super-Heroes vol. 4, #76 (January 1996). Joined the post-Infinite Crisis team in Final Crisis: Legion of 3 Worlds #5 (July 2009). | Creation of teleportation "gates". |
| Star Boy | Thom Kallor | Xanthu | First appeared in Legionnaires #0 (October 1994). Replaced Kid Quantum I following his death. Joined in Legion of Super-Heroes vol. 4, #76 (January 1996). | Ability to increase the mass of objects; for a time also had super-strength, super-speed, invulnerability, and electric vision. |

=== Post-draft ===
| Character | Real name | Home world | Membership notes | Powers |
|---|---|---|---|---|
| Element Lad | Jan Arrah | Trom | First appeared in Legion of Super-Heroes vol. 4, #71 (August 1995). Joined in Legionnaires #37 (June 1996). Killed by Live Wire in Legion Lost #12 (April 2001). | Elemental transmutation. |
| Ultra Boy | Jo Nah | Rimbor | First appeared in Legion of Super-Heroes vol. 4, #64 (January 1995). Joined in Legionnaires #37 (June 1996). | Super-strength, super-speed, flight, invulnerability, flash vision, and "penetra-vision" (all approximately at Kryptonian power levels), only one of which can be used at a time. |
| Superboy | Kon-El (a.k.a. Conner Kent) | Earth | First appeared in Adventures of Superman #500 (Early June 1993). Granted honorary membership in Legionnaires #31 (November 1995). Promotion to active duty foreshadowed in JSA #51 (October 2003), occurred prior to The Legion #26 (Early January 2004). Revealed to be a hybrid clone of Superman and Lex Luthor in Teen Titans vol. 3, #1 (September 2003). Killed by Superboy-Prime in Infinite Crisis #6 (May 2006). Resurrected in Final Crisis: Legion of 3 Worlds #4 (April 2009). | Kryptonian abilities and tactile telekinesis. |
| M'Onel (formerly Valor) | Lar Gand | Daxam | Reboot counterpart of Mon-El. First appeared in Eclipso: Darkness Within #2 (October 1992); Joined in Legionnaires #37 (June 1996). | Same powers as a Kryptonian, only vulnerable to lead instead of Kryptonite. |
| Magno | Dyrk Magz | Braal | First appeared and joined in Legionnaires #43 (December 1996). Depowered in Legionnaires #50 (July 1997); joined support staff in Legion of Super-Heroes vol. 4, #100 (January 1998). | Magnetism manipulation; control and generation of magnetic fields. |
| Umbra | Tasmia Mallor | Talok VIII | Reboot counterpart of Shadow Lass. First appeared and joined in Legionnaires #43 (December 1996). | Shadow-casting. |
| Sensor | Jeka Wynzorr | Orando | Reboot counterpart of Princess Projectra/Sensor Girl. First appeared and joined in Legionnaires #43 (December 1996). | Generation of illusions. |
| Ferro | Andrew Nolan | Earth | Reboot counterpart of Ferro Lad. First appeared in Adventures of Superman #540 (November 1996). Joined in Legion of Super-Heroes vol. 4, #93 (June 1997). | Ability to transform into iron, which also provides him with superhuman strength and invulnerability. |
| Inferno | "Sandy Anderson" | Earth | First appeared in Legion of Super-Heroes vol. 4, #64 (January 1995). (Note: Inferno's Legion membership status is debatable, as she was a Workforce member accidentally stranded in the 20th century with a group of Legionnaires in Legion of Super-Heroes vol. 4, #84–85 (September–October 1996). She leaves the group in Legion of Super-Heroes vol. 4, #96 (September 1997), and does not accompany them when they return to the 30th century four issues later.) | Heat and light generation. |
| Monstress | Candi Pyponte-Le Parc III | Xanthu | First appeared in Legion of Super-Heroes vol. 4, #82 (July 1996). Future membership foreshadowed in Legionnaires #50 (July 1997), occurred in Legionnaires #52 (September 1997). Killed by Element Lad in Legion Lost #11 (March 2001). | Super strength. |
| Karate Kid | Val Armorr | Omega Colony | First appeared in Legion of Super-Heroes vol. 4, #64 (January 1995). Joined in Legionnaires #60 (May 1998). | Mastery of all known martial arts. |
| Kid Quantum | Jazmin Cullen | Xanthu | First appeared in Legion of Super-Heroes vol. 4, #82 (July 1996). Joined in Legionnaires #60 (May 1998). | Ability to cast stasis fields. |
| Thunder | CeCe Beck | Binderaan (90th century) | First appeared in The Power of Shazam! Annual #1 (1996). Joined in Legion of Super-Heroes vol. 4, #110 (December 1998). | Super strength, wisdom, invulnerability, flight, speed, and enhanced mental perception; powers equivalent to those of Captain Marvel. |

=== Post-Blight ===
| Character | Real name | Home world | Membership notes | Powers |
|---|---|---|---|---|
| Wildfire (formerly ERG-1) | Drake Burroughs (composite entity of Randall Burroughs and Jahr-Drake Ningle) | Earth/Xanthu | Composite entity first appeared in Legionnaires #76 (October 1999). Joined in Legion of Super-Heroes vol. 4, #125 (March 2000). | Energy blasts and manipulation, flight. |
| Shikari | Shikari Lonestar | Kwai migrating colony | First appeared in Legion Lost #1 (May 2000). Joined in The Legion #3 (July 2002). | Pathfinding, ability to generate biological armor and claws, flight. |
| Gear | I.Z.O.R. | Lisnar | First appeared in Legion of Super-Heroes vol. 4, #117 (July 1999). Joined prior to The Legion #3 (February 2002). | Can interface with and modify computers and machinery. |
| Timber Wolf | Brin Londo | Rimbor | Joined in The Legion #13 (December 2002). | Superhuman agility and strength, claws and fangs, super-senses, and accelerated healing. |
| Dreamer | Nura Nal (legally changed from Nura Schnappin) | Naltor | Reboot counterpart of Dream Girl. First appeared in Legion of Super-Heroes vol. 4, #84 (September 1996). Joined in The Legion #23 (October 2003). | Precognition. |
| Blok | | Dryad | Legion membership foreshadowed in a one-panel appearance in JSA #51 (October 2003). | Superhuman strength and physical resistance; energy absorption. |

== "Threeboot" Legion (2004–2009) ==
The 2004 version of the Legion first appeared in the Teen Titans/Legion Special (November 2004). It was revealed in Final Crisis: Legion of 3 Worlds #5 (September 2009) that this version of the team inhabits Earth-Prime, the home of supervillain Superboy-Prime.

=== Founding members ===
| Character | Real name | Home world | Membership notes | Powers |
|---|---|---|---|---|
| Cosmic Boy | Rokk Krinn | Braal | Founding member; joined prior to Teen Titans/Legion Special. Joined the Knights Tempus (from the 41st century) in Supergirl and the Legion of Super-Heroes #30 (July 2007). | Magnetism manipulation; control and generation of magnetic fields. |
| Saturn Girl | Imra Ardeen | Titan | Founding member; joined prior to Teen Titans/Legion Special. | Telepathy; ability to read and control minds. |
| Lightning Lad | Garth Ranzz | Winath | Founding member; joined prior to Teen Titans/Legion Special. | Electrical manipulation; control and generation of electrical fields. |

=== Recruits ===
| Character | Real name | Home world | Membership notes | Powers |
|---|---|---|---|---|
| Triplicate Girl | Luornu Durgo | Cargg | Joined prior to Teen Titans/Legion Special. | Ability to split into three bodies. |
| Phantom Girl | Tinya Wazzo | Bzgtl | Joined prior to Teen Titans/Legion Special. | Intangibility. |
| Micro Lad (a.k.a. Colossal Boy) | Gim Allon | Earth | Joined prior to Teen Titans/Legion Special. | Naturally massive size; ability to shrink to human size. |
| Star Boy | Thom Kallor | Xanthu | Joined prior to Teen Titans/Legion Special. | Ability to increase the mass of objects. |
| Brainiac 5 | Querl Dox | Colu | Joined prior to Teen Titans/Legion Special. | 12th-level intelligence. |
| Atom Girl (a.k.a. Shrinking Violet) | Salu Digby | Imsk | Joined prior to Teen Titans/Legion Special. | Ability to shrink to microscopic size. |
| Ultra Boy | Jo Nah | Rimbor | Joined prior to Teen Titans/Legion Special. | Super-strength, super-speed, flight, invulnerability, flash vision, and "penetra-vision" (all approximately at Kryptonian power levels), only one of which can be used at a time. |
| Light Lass | Ayla Ranzz | Winath | Joined prior to Teen Titans/Legion Special. | Gravity negation. |
| Karate Kid | Val Armorr | Earth | Joined prior to Teen Titans/Legion Special. | Mastery of all known martial arts. |
| Princess Projectra | Wilimena Morgana Daergina Annaxandra Projectra Velorya Vauxhall | Orando | Joined prior to Teen Titans/Legion Special. | Generation of illusions. |
| Shadow Lass | Tasmia Mallor | Talok VIII | Joined prior to Teen Titans/Legion Special. | Shadow-casting. |
| Invisible Kid | Lyle Norg | Earth | Joined prior to Teen Titans/Legion Special. | Invisibility to the naked eye. |
| Chameleon | Reep Daggle | Durla | Androgynous version of Chameleon Boy. Joined prior to Teen Titans/Legion Special. | Shapeshifting. |
| Sun Boy | Dirk Morgna | Earth | Joined prior to Teen Titans/Legion Special. Killed by Superboy-Prime in Final Crisis: Legion of 3 Worlds #3 (April 2009). | Heat and light generation. |
| Element Lad | Jan Arrah | Trom | Joined prior to Teen Titans/Legion Special. Killed by Superboy-Prime in Final Crisis: Legion of 3 Worlds #4 (April 2009). | Elemental transmutation. |
| Dream Girl | Nura Nal | Naltor | Joined prior to Teen Titans/Legion Special. Killed in Legion of Super-Heroes vol. 5, #10 (November 2005); Resurrected in Legion of Super-Heroes #50 (March 2009). | Precognition. |
| Timber Wolf | Brin Londo | Zuun (also spelled Zoon) | Joined prior to Supergirl and the Legion of Super-Heroes #16 (May 2006). | Superhuman agility and strength. Later claws and fangs, super-senses, and accelerated healing. |
| Supergirl | Kara Zor-El | Krypton | Arrived on 21st century Earth in Superman/Batman #8 (May 2004). Joined in Supergirl and the Legion of Super-Heroes #17 (June 2006). | See Powers and abilities of Superman. |
| Dream Boy | Rol Purtha | Naltor | First appeared and joined in Supergirl and the Legion of Super-Heroes #18 (July 2006). | Precognition. |
| Mon-El | Lar Gand | Daxam | Joined prior to Final Crisis: Legion of 3 Worlds #1 (October 2008). | Same powers as a Kryptonian, but with vulnerability to lead instead of kryptonite. |
| Gazelle | Giselle Smith | Triton | First appeared in Legion of Super-Heroes vol. 5, #37 (February 2008). Joined in Legion of Super-Heroes vol. 5, #48 (January 2009). | Conscious metabolic control. |

=== Reserve members ===
| Character | Real name | Home world | Membership notes | Powers |
|---|---|---|---|---|
| Night Girl | Lydda Jath | Kathoon | First appeared and joined in Legion of Super-Heroes vol. 5, #48 (January 2009). | Super-strength when not in direct sunlight. |
| Sizzle | Teela Spuunvll | Abaddonus | First appeared and joined in Legion of Super-Heroes vol. 5, #48 (January 2009). | Able to absorb, alter and redirect energy. |
| Turtle | Bogdan Tarka | Doopa | First appeared and joined in Legion of Super-Heroes vol. 5, #48 (January 2009). | Extreme durability. |

== Post-Infinite Crisis Legion (1958–1989, 2007–2015) ==
This version of the Legion was first introduced in Adventure Comics #247 (April 1958) as the original version of the team, which appeared under various titles for 31 years until Legion of Super-Heroes vol. 3, #63 (August 1989). The "Five Years Later" Legion (1989–1994, vol. 4) picks up the original Legion's story line with "The Lightning Saga" story arc in Justice League of America and Justice Society of America (June–August 2007). Its membership reflects the original, pre-Crisis on Infinite Earths Legion up to the events of Legion of Super-Heroes vol. 3, #63, and includes changes in Legion membership made in the Superman and the Legion of Super-Heroes story arc, the Final Crisis: Legion of Three Worlds mini-series, and subsequent volumes of Legion of Super-Heroes.

=== Founding members ===
| Character | Real name | Home world | Membership notes | Powers |
|---|---|---|---|---|
| Cosmic Boy | Rokk Krinn | Braal | First appeared in Adventure Comics #247 (April 1958). Revealed to be a founding member in Superboy #147 (May/June 1968). | Magnetism manipulation; control and generation of magnetic fields. |
| Lightning Lad | Garth Ranzz | Winath | First appeared (as "Lightning Boy") in Adventure Comics #247 (April 1958). Revealed to be a founding member in Superboy #147 (May/June 1968). Killed battling Zaryan the Conqueror in Adventure Comics #304 (January 1963); later resurrected. | Electrical manipulation; control and generation of electrical fields. |
| Saturn Girl | Imra Ardeen | Titan | First appeared in Adventure Comics #247 (April 1958). Revealed to be a founding member in Superboy #147 (May/June 1968). | Telepathy; ability to read and control minds. |

=== Silver Age members ===
| Character | Real name | Home world | Membership notes | Powers |
|---|---|---|---|---|
| Duplicate Girl / Duplicate Damsel (formerly Triplicate Girl and Duo Damsel – name varied between Duplicate Girl and Duplicate Damsel during this period) | Luornu Durgo | Cargg | First appeared in Action Comics #276 (May 1961), already a member. Revealed in Superboy #147 (May/June 1968) to be the Legion's fourth member. One of her three selves was killed by Computo in Adventure Comics #340 (January 1966). Another one of her selves assumed the name "Una", as seen in Countdown #41 (July 18, 2007), and was killed by rats infected with the Morticoccus virus in Countdown to Final Crisis #5 (March 26, 2008). Subsequently acquired the ability to create numerous duplicates, as revealed in Final Crisis: Legion of 3 Worlds #5 (September 2009). | The ability to create numerous duplicates Originally, the ability to split into three bodies. |
| Phantom Girl | Tinya Wazzo | Bgztl | First appeared in Action Comics #276 (May 1961), already a member. Revealed in Superboy #147 (May/June 1968) to be the Legion's fifth member. | Intangibility. |
| Superman (formerly referred to as "Superboy" during visits to the late 30th century) | Kal-El (a.k.a. Clark Kent) | Krypton | First appeared in Action Comics #1 (June 1938). Joined the team as a teenager (as revealed in Justice Society of America vol. 3, #5 (June 2007). Used the name "Superboy" when visiting the late 30th century (as revealed in Adventure Comics vol. 2, #1 (October 2009) and depicted in Superman: Secret Origin #2 (December 2009). | See Powers and abilities of Superman. |
| Chameleon Boy | Reep Daggle | Durla | First appeared in Action Comics #267 (August 1960), already a member. | Shapeshifting. |
| Colossal Boy | Gim Allon | Earth | First appeared in Action Comics #267 (August 1960), already a member. | Ability to grow to gigantic size. |
| Invisible Kid | Lyle Norg | Earth | First appeared in Action Comics #267 (August 1960), already a member. Killed by Validus in Superboy and the Legion of Super-Heroes #203 (July–August 1974). | Invisibility to the naked eye. |
| Star Boy (a.k.a. Starman) | Thom Kallor | Xanthu | First appeared in Adventure Comics #282 (March 1961), already a member. Joined the Justice Society of America (as "Starman") in the 21st century in Justice Society of America vol. 3, #1 (January 2007). Revealed as the Starman from Kingdom Come in Justice Society of America vol. 3, #2 (February 2007). Killed by falling debris in Legion of Super-Heroes vol. 7, #18 (May 2013). Resurrected prior to Justice League United Annual #1 (December 2014). | Ability to increase the mass of objects; for a time, had powers similar to those of Superboy; ability to travel the space-time continuum, as revealed in Justice Society of America vol. 3, #20 (December 2008). |
| Brainiac 5 | Querl Dox | Colu | First appeared and joined in Action Comics #276 (May 1961). | 12th-level intelligence. |
| Supergirl | Kara Zor-El (a.k.a. Linda Lee Danvers) | Krypton | First appeared in Action Comics #252 (May 1959); Arrived on 21st century Earth in Superman/Batman #8 (May 2004). Future membership with the post-Infinite Crisis team foreshadowed in Supergirl vol. 5, #52 (June 2010), occurred in Supergirl Annual vol. 5, #2 (2010). Membership put her in history in the Silver Age stories of the Legion, not in the current Legion. Implied to have been killed between the Silver Age and current Legion. Killed by the Anti-Monitor in Crisis on Infinite Earths #7 (October 1985). | See Powers and abilities of Superman. |
| Sun Boy | Dirk Morgna | Earth | First appeared in Action Comics #276 (May 1961). Joined prior to Adventure Comics #290 (November 1961). Killed by Tharok in Legion of Super-Heroes vol. 7, #17 (April 2013). Resurrected prior to Justice League United Annual #1 (December 2014). | Heat and light generation. |
| Shrinking Violet | Salu Digby | Imsk | First appeared in Action Comics #276 (May 1961). Joined prior to Adventure Comics #290 (November 1961). | Ability to shrink to microscopic size. |
| Bouncing Boy | Chuck Taine | Earth | First appeared in Action Comics #276 (May 1961). Joined prior to Action Comics #287 (April 1962). | Super-bouncing. |
| Ultra Boy | Jo Nah | Rimbor | First appeared and joined in Superboy #98 (July 1962). | Super-strength, super-speed, flight, invulnerability, flash vision, and "penetra-vision" (all approximately at Kryptonian power levels), only one of which can be used at a time. |
| Mon-El | Lar Gand | Daxam | First appeared in Superboy #89 (June 1961). Sent to the Phantom Zone by a teenage Clark Kent in Action Comics Annual #10 (2007). Released from the Phantom Zone in the 21st century by Superman in Action Comics #874 and Superman #685 (April 2009). Joins the 21st-century Science Police as Jonathan Kent in Superman #686 (May 2009). Joins the 21st-century Justice League of America in Justice League of America vol. 2, #41 (March 2010). Joins the Legion after spending 1,000 years in the Phantom Zone, as depicted in Adventure Comics vol. 2, #11 (July 2010). | Same powers as a Kryptonian, but with vulnerability to lead instead of Kryptonite. |
| Matter-Eater Lad | Tenzil Kem | Bismoll | First appeared and joined in Adventure Comics #303 (December 1962). | Can eat any substance. |
| Element Lad (formerly Mystery Lad) | Jan Arrah | Trom | First appeared and joined in Adventure Comics #307 (April 1963). | Elemental transmutation. |
| Lightning Lass (also Light Lass) | Ayla Ranzz | Winath | First appeared and joined in Adventure Comics #308 (May 1963). | Electrical manipulation; control and generation of electrical fields. Later gravity negation, then regained her original powers. |
| Dream Girl | Nura Nal | Naltor | First appeared and joined in Adventure Comics #317 (February 1964). | Precognition. |
| Ferro Lad | Andrew Nolan | Earth | First appeared and joined in Adventure Comics #346 (July 1966). Killed destroying the Sun-Eater in Adventure Comics #353 (February 1967), part of "The Death of Ferro Lad" story arc. | Ability to transform into iron, which also provides him with superhuman strength and invulnerability. |
| Karate Kid | Val Armorr | Earth | First appeared and joined in Adventure Comics #346 (July 1966). Killed battling Nemesis Kid in Legion of Super-Heroes vol. 3, #4 (November 1984). Resurrected during the "Mystery Years" and first appeared as Trident in Justice League of America vol. 2, #3 (December 2006). Revealed as Karate Kid in Justice League of America vol. 2, #7 (May 2007). Died from the Morticoccus virus in Countdown to Final Crisis #7 (March 12, 2008). | Mastery of all known martial arts. |
| Sensor Girl (formerly Princess Projectra and Queen Projectra) | Projectra Wind'zzor | Orando | First appeared and joined in Adventure Comics #346 (July 1966). | Generation of illusions. As Sensor Girl, control over all five senses of herself and others and some super-vision powers. |
| Shadow Lass | Tasmia Mallor | Talok VIII | Alternate version (known as "Shadow Woman") first appeared as a future deceased member in Adventure Comics #354 (March 1967). Canonical version first appeared in Adventure Comics #365 (February 1968). Joined in Adventure Comics #366 (March 1968). | Shadow-casting. |
| Chemical King | Condo Arlik | Phlon | First mentioned as a future deceased member on the cover of Adventure Comics #354 (March 1967). Joined in Adventure Comics #372 (September 1968). Died preventing World War VII in Superboy and the Legion of Super-Heroes #228 (June 1977). | Control over the rate of chemical reactions. |
| Timber Wolf | Brin Londo | Zuun (also spelled Zoon) | First appeared (as "Lone Wolf") in Adventure Comics #327 (December 1964). Joined in Adventure Comics #372 (September 1968). | Superhuman agility and strength. Later claws and fangs, super-senses, and accelerated healing. |

=== "Bronze Age" members ===
| Character | Real name | Home world | Membership notes | Powers |
|---|---|---|---|---|
| Wildfire | Drake Burroughs | Earth | First appeared (as "ERG-1") in Superboy #195 (June 1973). Joined in Superboy #202 (May/June 1974). | Energy blasts and manipulation, flight. |
| Tyroc | Troy Stewart | Earth (Marzal Island) | First appeared in Superboy #216 (April 1976). Joined in Superboy #218 (July 1976). | Sonic screams that create unusual effects. |
| Dawnstar | | Starhaven | First appeared in Superboy #226 (April 1977). Joined in Superboy #229 (July 1977). | Interstellar tracking, flight, unaided space travel. |
| Blok | | Dryad | First appeared as a villain in Superboy and the Legion of Super-Heroes #253 (July 1979). Joined in Legion of Super-Heroes vol. 2, #272 (February 1981). | Superhuman strength and physical resistance; energy absorption. |
| Invisible Kid | Jacques Foccart | Earth | First appeared and joined in Legion of Super-Heroes vol. 2, Annual #1 (1982). | Invisibility to the naked eye and to most forms of detection. |
| Black Witch (formerly White Witch) | Mysa Nal | Naltor | First appeared (as "The Hag") in Adventure Comics #350 (November 1966). Joined in Legion of Super-Heroes vol. 2, #294 (December 1982). Absorbed the magical abilities of Mordru and Earth-247's magicians in Final Crisis: Legion of 3 Worlds #5 (September 2009). | Spellcasting. |
| Magnetic Kid | Pol Krinn | Braal | First appeared in Adventure Comics #335 (August 1965). Joined in Legion of Super-Heroes vol. 3, #14 (September 1985). Killed by the Arch-Mage in Legion of Super-Heroes vol. 3, #62 (July 1989). | Magnetism manipulation; ability to generate and control magnetic fields. |
| Polar Boy | Brek Bannin | Tharr | First appeared in Adventure Comics #306 (March 1963). Joined in Legion of Super-Heroes vol. 3, #14 (September 1985). | Cold manipulation; ability to absorb heat and produce cold. |
| Quislet | (an unpronounceable glyph) | Teall | First appeared and joined in Legion of Super-Heroes vol. 3, #14 (September 1985). | Energy being possessing the ability to inhabit and animate inanimate objects, which disintegrate after he leaves them. |
| Tellus | Ganglios | Hyrakius | First appeared in Legion of Super-Heroes vol. 3, #9 (April 1985) as a student at the Legion Academy. Joined in Legion of Super-Heroes vol. 3, #14 (September 1985). | Telepathy and telekinesis. |

=== Post-Infinite Crisis members ===
| Character | Real name | Home world | Membership notes | Powers |
|---|---|---|---|---|
| Night Girl | Lydda Jath | Kathoon | First appeared in Adventure Comics #306 (March 1963). Legion membership first mentioned by Starman in Justice Society of America vol. 3, #6 (July 2007) and confirmed in Action Comics #860 (February 2008). | Super-strength when not in direct sunlight. |
| Chameleon Girl | Yera Allon | Durla | First appeared (impersonating Shrinking Violet) in Legion of Super-Heroes vol. 2, #286 (April 1982). True form and identity revealed in Legion of Super-Heroes vol. 2, #305 (November 1983). Legion membership first revealed in Action Comics #861 (March 2008). | Shapeshifting. |
| Karate Kid | Myg | Lythyl | First appeared in Legion of Super-Heroes vol. 3, #13 (August 1985). Joined as a replacement for Val Armorr, as revealed in Final Crisis: Legion of 3 Worlds #1 (October 2008). Killed by Radiation Roy in Final Crisis: Legion of 3 Worlds #3 (April 2009). | Mastery of all known martial arts. |
| Green Lantern | Rond Vidar | Earth | First appeared in Adventure Comics #349 (October 1966); granted honorary membership in Adventure Comics #360 (September 1967). Revealed as a Green Lantern in Legion of Super-Heroes vol. 3, #50 (September 1988). Last remaining member of the Green Lantern Corps, as revealed in Final Crisis: Legion of 3 Worlds #2 (November 2008). Killed in the same issue by Superboy-Prime. | Possesses a Green Lantern power ring. |
| XS | Jenni Ognats | Aarok | First appeared in Legionnaires #0 (October 1994); granddaughter of Barry Allen and first cousin of Bart Allen. Native of the same universe as the post-Infinite Crisis team, as revealed in Final Crisis: Legion of 3 Worlds #3 (April 2009). Joined the Earth-247 team in Legion of Super-Heroes vol. 4, #62 (November 1994). Joined the post-Infinite Crisis team in Final Crisis: Legion of 3 Worlds #5 (September 2009). | Superspeed. |
| Gates | Ti'julk Mr'asz | Vyrga | First appeared in Legion of Super-Heroes vol. 4, #66 (March 1995). Joined the Earth-247 team in Legion of Super-Heroes vol. 4, #76 (January 1996). Joined the post-Infinite Crisis team in Final Crisis: Legion of 3 Worlds #5 (September 2009). | Creation of teleportation "gates". |
| Earth-Man | Kirt Niedrigh | Earth | Pre-Crisis version first appeared (as "Absorbency Boy") in Superboy and the Legion of Super-Heroes #218 (July 1976). Joined in Legion of Super-Heroes vol. 6, #2 (August 2010). Died battling the Adversary in Legion of Super-Heroes vol. 6, #16 (October 2011). | Super-power absorption and duplication. |
| Comet Queen | Grava | Extal Colony | First appeared in Legion of Super-Heroes vol. 2, #304 (October 1983) as a student at the Legion Academy. Joined between Legion of Super-Heroes vol. 6, #16 (October 2011) and Legion of Super-Heroes vol. 7, #1 (November 2011). | Space flight, comet gas extrusion. |
| Chemical Kid | Hadru Jamik | Phlon | First appeared in Legion of Super-Heroes vol. 6, #6 (December 2010) as a student at the Legion Academy. Joined between Legion of Super-Heroes vol. 6, #16 (October 2011) and Legion of Super-Heroes vol. 7, #1 (November 2011). | Catalyze chemical reactions. |
| Glorith | | Unknown | First appeared in Adventure Comics #523 (April 2011) as a student at the Legion Academy. Joined between Legion of Super-Heroes vol. 6, #16 (October 2011) and Legion of Super-Heroes vol. 7, #1 (November 2011). | Manipulation of mystical energies. |
| Dragonwing | Marya Pai | Earth | First appeared in Legion of Super-Heroes vol. 6, #6 (December 2010) as a student at the Legion Academy. Joined between Legion of Super-Heroes vol. 6, #16 (October 2011) and Legion of Super-Heroes vol. 7, #1 (November 2011). | Fire breath and acid absorption. |
| Harmonia | Harmonia Li | Earth | First appeared in Legion of Super-Heroes vol. 6, #1 (July 2010). Joined between Legion of Super-Heroes vol. 6, #16 (October 2011) and Legion of Super-Heroes vol. 7, #1 (November 2011). | Elemental. |

== Arrowverse ==
This version of the team appears in the TV series Supergirl, referred to as "the Legion". (Note: Other members have been stated to exist, but none of their names have been revealed.)

| Character | Real name | Home world | First Appearance | Notes | Portrayed by |
|---|---|---|---|---|---|
| Mon-El | Mon-El | Daxam | Supergirl; S2E1 "The Adventures of Supergirl" (2016) | | Chris Wood |
| Saturn Girl | Imra Ardeen | Titan | Supergirl; S3E7 "Wake Up" (2017) | | Amy Jackson |
| Toyman (formerly Computer Lad) | Winn Schott Jr. | Earth | Supergirl; S1E1 "Pilot" (2015) | Took the name Toyman to 'reinvent' it as a symbol of good after defeating an evil doppelganger of himself and reconnecting with his father who died shortly after, both who used the name for evil purposes. | Jeremy Jordan |
| Brainiac-5 | Querl Dox | Colu | Supergirl S3E10 "Legion of Super-Heroes" (2018) | Was forced to stay in the present day and leave the team after Brainiac created a virus that could be fatal to him, making it unsafe for him to return to the future. | Jesse Rath |
| Dream Girl | Nura Nal | Naltor | Supergirl; S4E13 "What's So Funny About Truth, Justice, and the American Way?" (2019); (mentioned) | The series features an ancestor of Nura named Nia Nal, who becomes the superhero Dreamer (an alternate name for Dream Girl in the comics). | Nicole Maines |
| Chameleon | Reep Daggle | Durla | Supergirl; S3E18 "Shelter from the Storm" (2018); (mentioned) | | |
| Lightning Lass | Ayla | Winath | Supergirl; S3E10 "Legion of Super-Heroes" (2018); (mentioned); Supergirl; S5E11 "Back From the Future: Part One" (2020); (photograph) | | Unknown (Note: Actress is shown in photograph, but remains unnamed.) |
| Karate Kid | Val Armorr | Earth | Supergirl; S4E13 "What's So Funny About Truth, Justice, And The American Way?" (2019); (mentioned) | | |
