= Laurel Gand =

Fictional DC Comics superheroine

- Laurel Gand as Andromeda, as depicted in Legion of Super-Heroes vol. 4 #66 (March 1995). Art by Lee Moder.

Publication information
- Publisher: DC Comics
- First appearance: Original: Legion of Super-Heroes (vol. 4) #6 (April 1990); Post-Zero Hour: Legion of Super-Heroes (vol. 4) #66 (March 1995)
- Created by: Tom and Mary Bierbaum; Keith Giffen; Al Gordon (based upon Supergirl by Otto Binder and Al Plastino)

In-story information
- Alter ego: Laurel Gand
- Species: Daxamite
- Place of origin: Daxam (31st century)
- Team affiliations: Legion of Super-Heroes; White Triangle
- Notable aliases: Andromeda, Sister Andromeda
- Abilities: See list: Superhuman strength, speed, stamina, agility, durability longevity, and reflexes; Solar energy radiation absorption; Super-Hearing; Enhanced visual perception; Electromagnetic spectrum vision; Telescopic vision; Microscopic vision; Heat vision; X-ray vision; Thermal vision; Infrared vision; Ultraviolet vision; Flight; Invulnerability; Super-breath; Freezing breath; Wind breath; Longevity; Indomitable will; Self-sustenance; Accelerated healing; Genius-level intellect; Basic hand-to-hand combatant

Laurel Gand is a superheroine appearing in DC Comics, primarily as a member of the Legion of Super-Heroes in the 30th and 31st centuries under the name Andromeda. She was created as a replacement for Supergirl, who was killed in Crisis on Infinite Earths. She was also inspired by elements of Superman's supposed descendant Laurel Kent, who is later revealed to be a Manhunter.

== Fictional character biography ==
=== Pre-Zero Hour ===
Laurel Gand, also known as Andromeda, takes the place of Supergirl in the new timeline created by Glorith, in which aspects of the Legion of Super-Heroes' history was altered. In the new timeline, Gand participated in key events that Supergirl was originally present for.

Laurel Gand is a Daxamite who was born on Ricklef II, an asteroid near Daxam which her mother worked on. Ricklef housed a city and research station. When Gand was a child, Khund forces attacked Ricklef, threatening to invade Daxam. After the Khunds killed her parents, Gand managed to fend them off using her knowledge of the base. Some time later, Gand was forced to live in exile on Earth after being informed that the Science Police would not be able to protect her from the Khunds.

After arriving on Earth, Gand is approached by Saturn Girl, Triad, and Phantom Girl, who invite her to join the Legion of Super-Heroes. As part of her initiation into the group, Gand tasks herself with gathering historical artifacts for the Legion. While excavating the artifacts, Gand is exposed to lead and contracts lead poisoning, which is fatal to Daxamites. Brainiac 5 realizes that Gand had been taking an anti-lead serum which would have protected her, but she built up an immunity to it over time. Brainiac 5 heals Gand by modifying the serum, revitalizing its effects.

Gand goes on to marry Rond Vidar, with whom she has a daughter named Lauren. Gand spends years away from the Legion battling Khund forces and defending the United Planets. She rejoins the Legion after Rond Vidar disappears while trying to rescue the White Witch from Mordru.

A few years later, "Batch SW6", a group consisting of temporal clones of the Legionnaires, escapes from the Dominators' captivity. The SW6 version of Laurel Gand becomes known as Andromeda, distinguishing her from her mainline counterpart.

The original version of Laurel Gand stays with her Legion after the group is forced to go underground to fight corruption in the Science Police. Gand dies after being injured during one of the renegade Legion's early missions. Shortly thereafter, Gand and the rest of the Legion are erased from history, following the Zero Hour reboot.

=== Post-Zero Hour ===
In post-Zero Hour continuity, Laurel Gand was originally a member of the xenophobic White Triangle group before joining the Legion. Due to Daxamites' vulnerability to lead, she is forced to wear a special suit to protect her from it.

Gand is nearly killed by lead poisoning after her suit is damaged, prompting Brainiac 5 to create an anti-lead serum for her. Around this time, Shrinking Violet discovers a White Triangle necklace in Gand's room and deduces that she is connected to the group.

Andromeda confronts Daxamite ambassador Roxxas, with both being presumed dead in the ensuing fight after being caught in an explosion. Cosmic Boy is secretly informed that Andromeda survived and voluntarily exiled herself to Planet Hell.

After the events of Infinite Crisis, Earth-247, the home of the post-Zero Hour Legion, is destroyed. Andromeda appears in Final Crisis: Legion of 3 Worlds, where she is among the Legionnaires who battle Superboy-Prime. Andromeda's pre-Zero Hour counterpart is among the Legionnaires from alternate realities who are summoned to battle the Time Trapper.

== Powers and abilities ==
Generally, the abilities of Laurel Gand and other Daxamites are identical to those of Superman and other natives of the planet Krypton (super-strength; speed; flight; X-ray, heat, microscopic or telescopic vision powers; invulnerability and super hearing). However, she is vulnerable to lead rather than kryptonite.

== In other media ==
- Laurel Gand as Andromeda makes a cameo appearance in the Superman: The Animated Series episode "New Kids In Town".
- Laurel Gand as Andromeda appears as a character summon in Scribblenauts Unmasked: A DC Comics Adventure.
- Laurel Gand as Andromeda appears in Justice League Adventures #28.

== See also ==
- Alternative versions of Supergirl
