= Shadow Lass =

DC Comics character

- Classic 1970s depiction of Shadow Lass

Publication information
- Publisher: DC Comics
- First appearance: Adventure Comics #365 (February 1968)
- Created by: Jim Shooter (writer); Curt Swan (artist)

In-story information
- Alter ego: Tasmia Mallor
- Species: Talokian
- Place of origin: Talok VIII
- Team affiliations: Legion of Super-Heroes
- Notable aliases: Umbra
- Abilities: Powers: Darkness generation and manipulation; Abilities: Expert hand-to-hand combatant; Diplomacy; Equipment: Legion Flight Ring

Shadow Lass (Tasmia Mallor) is a superheroine appearing in books published by DC Comics. She first appeared as a statue in Adventure Comics #354 (March 1967), and was created by Jim Shooter and Curt Swan. She was called Shadow Woman and as having been killed in action defending the science asteroid, in an Adult Legion story. Her official first appearance is Adventure Comics #365 (February 1968).

== Fictional character biography ==
Tasmia Mallor originates from the planet Talok VIII, and possesses darkness-manipulating abilities that she and her cousin Grev (Shadow Kid) received from their ancestors, whose spirits reside in a cave on Talok VIII (Talokians practice ancestor worship). As her ancestors before her from the past thousand years, Tasmia is the hereditary shadow champion of Talok VIII. Her 20th century ancestors, Lydea Mallor and Lyrissa Mallor, are also shadow champions and members of the interstellar police force L.E.G.I.O.N.

Grev Mallor joins the Legion Academy as Shadow Kid, but knows that he cannot join the Legion due to a rule preventing members from having the same powers. However, he believes that he is better prepared to defend Talok in Tasmia's absence.

Shadow Lass joins the Legion after her homeworld is invaded by the Fatal Five, and she helps the Legion to defeat them. After joining, she becomes romantically involved with Lar Gand and eventually marries him.

=== 1994 reboot ===
In post-Zero Hour continuity, Shadow Lass was raised by priests and separated from her mother, the previous Shadow Champion, to ensure their safety. After her mother is killed in battle, Tasmia gains her ancestors' shadow powers. Shortly afterward, a United Planets ship arrives on Talok VIII, proselytizing the benefits of U.P. membership. Despite Tasmia's efforts, the priests agree to have Talok VIII join the United Planets. Tasmia is dismissed and travels to Earth, where she joins the Legion of Super-Heroes as Umbra.

Umbra is later among the Legionnaires who are lost in a space rift and transported to another galaxy. Saturn Girl attempts to telepathically calm her, but a telepathic matrix interferes with her powers. This leaves Saturn Girl comatose and creates a shadow creature fueled by Umbra and Saturn Girl's combined pain and fear. Left without pain or fear, Umbra attacks Ultra Boy and Monstress. Brainiac 5 manages to restore Umbra and Saturn Girl's minds, which causes Umbra to break down crying.

After returning to United Planets space, Umbra's powers suddenly stop working. To find out what had happened, she returns to Talok VIII for the first time since her dismissal. There, she finds the planet completely cloaked in shadow. Maven, one of the priests who had trained her, informs Umbra that after her loss in the rift, she was presumed dead. The priests empowered Umbra's cousin Grev with the shadows and had him cloak Talok VII in shadow, withdrawing from the United Planets. Umbra confronts Grev, but finds that he has died after being overwhelmed by his powers. Umbra regains her powers and removes the cloak from Talok VIII before returning to the Legion.

=== Post-2004 Legion ===
In 2004, the Legion continuity was again restarted. This version of Shadow Lass was in a relationship with Karate Kid, but they had broken up by the time the series started. Shadow Lass also has a friendly rivalry with Grev, who in this continuity is her brother, rather than cousin.

=== Post-Infinite Crisis: Retroboot Legion ===
Shadow Lass as depicted in Supergirl and the Legion of Super-Heroes #19 (August 2006). Art by Barry Kitson.

The events of Infinite Crisis restore an analogue of the pre-Crisis Legion to continuity. Shadow Lass is included in their number, and is among the group of Legionnaires who help Superman defeat the Justice League of Earth.

During the League's xenophobic reign, Shadow Lass works with Night Girl, Timber Wolf, and Lightning Lass to help thousands of aliens escape Earth.

Shadow Lass is shown prominently in the teaser image for the Final Crisis: Legion of 3 Worlds mini-series, using her powers to keep Mordru and Saturn Queen in the dark. In the story, she, Phantom Girl, and Lightning Lass rescue Mon-El from the Phantom Zone, where Earth-Man had imprisoned him. Upon leaving the Zone, Mon-El once again suffers the effects of lead poisoning, but is cured with an antidote created by Brainiac 5.

In Doomsday Clock, Shadow Lass is among the Legion of Super-Heroes members who appear in the present after Doctor Manhattan undoes his alternations to the timeline, restoring the Legion and the Justice Society of America.

== Powers and abilities ==
Shadow Lass in all her incarnations can cast dark fields that block all light. These can either be complete, effectively rendering useless all light sources within the area, or hollow to allow the interior to be lit. She can also solidify these fields, to use as a more direct weapon.

She is also an expert hand-to-hand combatant, and can see in complete darkness (both her own and otherwise). As a member of the Legion of Super-Heroes, Shadow Lass is provided a Legion Flight Ring, which allows her to fly and protects her from the vacuum of space and other dangerous environments.

== In other media ==
=== Television ===
Shadow Lass makes a non-speaking cameo appearance in the Justice League Unlimited episode "Far From Home".

=== Film ===
- Shadow Lass makes a non-speaking cameo appearance in Justice League vs. the Fatal Five.
- Shadow Lass appears in Legion of Super-Heroes, voiced by Victoria Grace. This version is a council member of the Legion Academy.

=== Video games ===
Shadow Lass appears as a character summon in Scribblenauts Unmasked: A DC Comics Adventure.

=== Miscellaneous ===
- Shadow Lass appears in Adventures in the DC Universe #10.
- Shadow Lass appears in Batman '66 Meets the Legion of Super-Heroes.
