= Ayla Ranzz =

DC Comics character

- Light Lass, from the "threeboot" continuity. Art by Barry Kitson.

Publication information
- Publisher: DC Comics
- First appearance: Adventure Comics #308 (May 1963)
- Created by: Edmond Hamilton (writer); John Forte (artist)

In-story information
- Alter ego: Ayla Ranzz
- Species: Winathian
- Place of origin: Winath
- Team affiliations: Legion of Super-Heroes
- Notable aliases: Light Lass, Pulse, Gossamer, Spark, Live Wire, Lightning Lass
- Abilities: Powers: Electrokinesis and electrogenesis; Energy absorption; Gravity manipulation; Flight; Abilities: Hand-to-hand combat (basic); Equipment: Legion Flight Ring

Ayla Ranzz, also known as Lightning Lass, Light Lass, Gossamer, and Spark, is a character appearing in media published by DC Comics. She is a member of the Legion of Super-Heroes in the 30th and 31st centuries, as well as the sister of Lightning Lad and Lightning Lord.

There have been three versions of Ayla since her original debut; these versions are separated by the events of both the Zero Hour: Crisis in Time! and Infinite Crisis limited series.

Ayla has made limited appearances in media outside comics, including the animated series Superman: The Animated Series and Legion of Super Heroes and the animated film Justice League vs. the Fatal Five.

== Fictional character biography ==
First appearance of Lightning Lass from Adventure Comics #308, art by John Forte.

=== Silver Age ===
Ayla Ranzz first appeared in Adventure Comics #308 (May 1963). She is the twin sister of fellow Legionnaire Garth (Lightning Lad) and the younger sister of the villainous Mekt (Lightning Lord). All three gained electrical superpowers after being attacked by creatures called Lightning Beasts on the planet Korbal. She originally joins the Legion disguised as her brother Lightning Lad, claiming to be him resurrected after his apparent death at the hands of Zaryan. Ayla is quickly discovered to be an imposter, but is allowed to join the Legion as Lightning Lass. Later, Ayla gains gravity manipulation powers from Dream Girl and becomes known as Light Lass.

Years later, Ayla leaves the Legion, disillusioned with her Legion career and having ended a lengthy romance with fellow Legionnaire Timber Wolf. She broke up with him following a misunderstanding when she saw Timber Wolf embracing her sister-in-law Saturn Girl when both were stranded on a frozen asteroid. After returning to Winath, Ayla is kidnapped by her brother Lightning Lord and a faction of the Legion of Super-Villains. When Ayla refuses to join them, her brother tried to kill her, though she survives and discovers that her original lightning powers had been restored. After the LSV is defeated, Ayla rejoins the Legion as Lightning Lass.

During the "Five Year Later" storyline, Ayla is revealed to be in a relationship with Shrinking Violet.

During the "Five Year Gap" following the Magic Wars, Earth falls under the control of the Dominators and withdraws from the United Planets. A few years later, the Dominators' classified "Batch SW6", temporal clones of the Legionnaires, escape captivity. After Earth is destroyed in a disaster, a few dozen surviving cities and their inhabitants reconstitute their world as New Earth, and the SW6 Light Lass assumes the code name Spark.

=== Post-Zero Hour (Spark) ===
Spark's introduction as Live Wire's replacement in Legionnaires #20 (December 1994); art by Jeff Moy.

Ayla, known as Spark, originally joined the Legion as a replacement for her twin brother Live Wire, as their planet Winath decided to choose her rather than Garth, who had been classified as a runaway. Eventually, the "one member per planet" restriction was lifted, and he rejoined.

She was one of the Legion members stranded in the 21st century for a time by the Emerald Eye of Ekron. Her team helped the modern superheroes during The Final Night event, where Earth's sun was slowly being devoured by a Sun-Eater. Some time after the sun is restored, Ayla travels into the Source, which replaces her electrical powers with anti-gravity powers. Upon returning to the 31st century and reuniting with her brother, Ayla begins experiencing debilitating headaches when using her powers, which are diagnosed as psychosomatic. Apparently, she is unable to handle having different powers than her brother. In a desperate attempt to restore her old powers, Ayla returns to Korbal and goads a Lightning Beast into shocking her, but is killed due to having lost her immunity to electricity. Garth resurrects Ayla by channeling electricity into her, which restores her original powers.

=== Threeboot (Light Lass) ===
Following another reboot of Legion continuity, Ayla Ranzz is again called Light Lass, and has gravity nullifying powers. In Supergirl and the Legion of Super-Heroes #26, it is revealed that she, like her siblings, had previously gained lightning powers after the accident on Korbal before another unspecified accident gave her gravitational powers.

=== Post-Infinite Crisis - Return of original Lightning Lass ===
The events of the Infinite Crisis miniseries restored an analogue of the pre-Crisis Legion of Super-Heroes to continuity. Ayla Ranzz is reintroduced in "The Lightning Saga" story arc, possessing her original powers as Lightning Lass.

Ayla is next seen in Final Crisis: Legion of 3 Worlds, where she holds open the entrance to the Phantom Zone so her fellow Legionnaires Shadow Lass and Phantom Girl can rescue Mon-El. She and her alternate universe counterparts help resurrect Bart Allen, with Ayla and Spark providing XS with lightning charges.

Ayla is later seen in the sixth volume of Legion of Super-Heroes, where she is shown preparing to go on a holiday vacation with Shrinking Violet. It is subsequently revealed that the two are romantically involved.

== Powers and abilities ==
Depending on the continuity, Ayla Ranzz possesses either the ability to manipulate electricity or gravity. As a member of the Legion of Super-Heroes, she is provided a Legion Flight Ring, which allows her to fly and protects her from the vacuum of space and other dangerous environments.

== Reception ==
Ayla Ranzz was ranked 47th in Comics Buyer's Guide's "100 Sexiest Women in Comics" list.

== In other media ==
=== Television ===
- Ayla Ranzz as Lightning Lass makes a non-speaking cameo appearance in the Superman: The Animated Series episode "New Kids In Town".
- Ayla Ranzz appears in the Legion of Super Heroes episode "Chained Lightning", voiced by Kari Wahlgren. This version was transformed into an incorporeal energy being and presumed dead during the incident that gave her brothers Garth and Mekt their powers. In the present, Imperiex attempts to use Ayla to power a tachyon cannon, but Mekt and Garth work together to restore her.

=== Film ===
Ayla Ranzz as Lightning Lass appears in a photograph in Justice League vs. the Fatal Five.

=== Video games ===
Ayla Ranzz as Lightning Lass appears as a character summon in Scribblenauts Unmasked: A DC Comics Adventure.

=== Miscellaneous ===
- Ayla Ranzz as Spark appears in Adventures in the DC Universe #10.
- Ayla Ranzz as Lightning Lass appears in Batman '66 Meets the Legion of Super-Heroes.
