= Myg (character) =

Fictional character

Karate Kid
- Myg as depicted in Who's Who in the Legion of Super-Heroes #3 (July 1988). Art by Greg LaRocque.

Publication information
- Publisher: DC Comics
- First appearance: Legion of Super-Heroes (vol. 3) #13 (August 1985)
- Created by: Paul Levitz; Steve Lightle; Larry Mahlstedt

In-story information
- Alter ego: Myg
- Species: Human
- Place of origin: Lythyl (31st century)
- Team affiliations: Legion of Super-Heroes; Legion of Substitute Heroes
- Abilities: Martial arts mastery; Superhuman physical abilities

Myg is a superhero in the future of the DC Comics universe. He is a master of every form of martial arts to have been developed by the 30th and 31st centuries. Following in the footsteps of Val Armorr, he became the second individual to assume the identity Karate Kid, and briefly served as a member of the Legion of Super-Heroes.

== Fictional character biography ==
In accordance with the will of Val Armorr, the first Karate Kid, Timber Wolf and Sensei Toshiaki travel to the planet Lythyl. They meet with Lythyl's ruling council, of which Myg is a member. After engaging the pair in a test of hand-to-hand combat skills, Myg is taken to Armorr's grave on the planetoid Shanghalla. Humbled by the level of respect given to Armorr even in death, Myg vows to follow in his path. He assumes the mantle of Karate Kid, enrolls in the Legion Academy, and briefly joins the Legion of Substitute Heroes.

At some point, Myg joins the Legion of Super-Heroes. Years later, he becomes Lythyl's representative to the United Planets and advocates for the Legion to disband. Myg is killed by Radiation Roy during an attack on the United Planets by the Justice League of Earth.

== Powers and abilities ==
Like his predecessor Val Armorr, Myg is a master of every documented form of martial arts. He can sense the weakest spot in an object and damage durable materials such as metal and stone with a single blow.
