= Brainiac 4 =

Brainiac 4 is the name of two fictional characters appearing in American comic books published by DC Comics.

== Fictional character biography ==
=== Pre-Zero Hour/Post-Infinite Crisis ===
Brainiac 4

Publication information
- Publisher: DC Comics
- First appearance: Adventure Comics #335 (August 1965)

In-story information
- Alter ego: Kajz Dox
- Species: Coluan
- Place of origin: Colu
- Abilities: Twelfth-level intelligence

The Silver Age version of Brainiac 4 is Kajz Dox, the father of Querl Dox (Brainiac 5). Kajz dies on the planet Colu when Querl is still a young boy.

After the events of Infinite Crisis and the Legion of Super-Heroes continuity reverting to history similar to that of the Legion before the events of Zero Hour, Brainiac 5's immediate ancestor Brainiac 4 is again shown to be a male. He had taken the name Brainiac 4 after 1,000 years to reclaim the name as something that could be admired.

=== Post-Zero Hour ===
Brainiac 4

Publication information
- Publisher: DC Comics
- First appearance: Legion of Super-Heroes #107 (August 1998)

In-story information
- Species: Coluan
- Place of origin: Colu
- Team affiliations: Dark Circle

The second Brainiac 4 first appears in Legion of Super-Heroes #107 (August 1998), where she is revealed to be leader of the Dark Circle and the mother of Brainiac 5.

From her birth, she suffered from a lack of emotion, even abandoning her son at his birth in an attempt to find something emotionally stimulating. Living a variety of lives, from beggar woman to hero to gambler, she eventually becomes the leader of the Dark Circle and finds something that caused her to feel emotion: sending an entire fleet to its death. Eventually, her son finds her, only to have Brainiac 4 try to kill him in the expectation that, if killing strangers caused her to feel good, killing her son will make her feel better. After being stopped by Gates, she is committed to an asylum. Following the Mark Waid reboot, Brainiac 5's mother is not a villain. She briefly appears as one of a number of Coluans suffering from a sickness that reduces their mental abilities as part of an attack on the United Planets.

== In other media ==
Brainiac 4 appears in Legion of Super-Heroes (2023), voiced by Robbie Daymond. This version is a clone of Brainiac and member of the Dark Circle who was created to steal the Miracle Machine. After his failure to do so, Brainiac fuses him into himself, but Brainiac 5 later manipulates Brainiac 4 and his fellow clones into fighting and killing one another from the inside.
