= Phantom Girl =

DC Comics character

- Tinya Wazzo as Apparition, as depicted in Legionnaires #20 (December 1994). Art by Jeff Moy.

Publication information
- Publisher: DC Comics
- First appearance: Action Comics #276 (May 1961)
- Created by: Jerry Siegel; Jim Mooney

In-story information
- Alter ego: Tinya Wazzo; Linnya Wazzo
- Species: Bgztlian; Bgztlian-Carggite hybrid (post-Zero Hour continuity only)
- Place of origin: Bgztl (4th dimension parallel with Earth)
- Team affiliations: Legion of Super-Heroes; L.E.G.I.O.N. Justice League; Terrifics
- Notable aliases: Phase, Apparition
- Abilities: Phasing/intangibility; Interdimensional travel; Skilled martial artist; Flight via Legion Flight Ring

Phantom Girl (Tinya Wazzo) is a superhero appearing in books published by DC Comics, and is a member of the Legion of Super-Heroes in the 30th and 31st centuries. In post-Zero Hour continuity, she is known as Apparition. She has the power to turn intangible, as do all other natives of her home planet, Bgztl. Her mother is Winema Wazzo, the president of the United Planets. Tinya’s ancestor Linnya Wazzo appears in DC's New Age of Heroes as a member of the Terrifics.

Phantom Girl has appeared in various media outside comics, primarily those featuring the Legion of Super-Heroes. She is voiced by Heather Hogan in Legion of Super Heroes (2006) and Kari Wahlgren in Young Justice, and portrayed by Mika Abdalla in The Flash.

== Publication history ==
Phantom Girl first appeared in Action Comics #276, and was created by Jerry Siegel and Jim Mooney.

== Fictional character biography ==
=== Pre-Crisis ===
In the original pre-Crisis continuity, Phantom Girl is the fifth member to join the Legion and is a native of Bgztl, a planet in the fourth dimension. Like other Bgztlians, Phantom Girl can phase out of reality and become intangible. She is a member of the Legion's Espionage Squad, and is involved romantically with fellow Legionnaire Ultra Boy for many years.

Following the Magic Wars, Earth falls under the control of the Dominators and withdraws from the United Planets. Sometime thereafter, Phantom Girl is thought to have been killed in a shuttle accident. In reality, the time sorceress Glorith sends her to the 20th century, where she forgets her true identity, assumes the name Phase, and joins the interstellar law enforcement agency L.E.G.I.O.N.

A few years later, the members of the Dominators' "Batch SW6" escape captivity. They are initially believed to be clones of the Legionnaires, but are later revealed to be temporal duplicates. The SW6 version of Tinya Wazzo eventually assumes the codename Apparition.

=== Post-Zero Hour ===
In post-Zero Hour continuity, Tinya is the daughter of Winema Wazzo, the Bgztlian ambassador to the United Planets, and regularly chafes under her mother's overbearing nature. While helping her at a conference, which includes the official unveiling of the Legion of Super-Heroes, Tinya and Saturn Girl uncover a plot by R. J. Brande's former assistant Roderick Doyle to attack the establishment. After helping to stop him, Tinya and Triad are inducted into the team.

When Tinya and Ultra Boy meet, the two are instantly smitten with each other. Their romance is rocky, initially complicated by Winema's interference. Tinya is then apparently killed by Daxamite White Triangle terrorists, who incinerate her with their heat vision. However, shortly afterward, she is revealed to have survived, albeit in a permanently intangible and invisible state, only being visible to Ultra Boy and Winema. Afterwards, she helps free Shrinking Violet and the Legion from the Emerald Eye's control until Violet panics and causes the Eye to send many of the Legionnaires, including Saturn Girl, Ultra Boy, and Apparition, back in time to the late 20th century.

While stranded in the past, Apparition meets a psychic using a Bgztlian touchstone - a red stone that assists in Bgztlians' phasing. This encounter ends with her becoming visible to all and gaining the power to disrupt machinery and electronics by phasing through them. Shortly thereafter, Phase of L.E.G.I.O.N. arrives to retrieve her touchstone. She and Apparition are sucked into the realm within the touchstone and discover that they both identify as Tinya Wazzo. When the two make physical contact, they involuntarily merge and Apparition becomes the dominant personality in the resulting body. Through hypnotic regression, Apparition learns that her father was a Carggite and that she inherited his ability to triplicate. Winema was only aware that she had given birth to a single child; Tinya's father stole her other two bodies and sold them to the Luck Lords to pay off his gambling debts. The fate of Tinya's third self remains unknown. After being displaced in time, Apparition and Ultra Boy eventually reunite, marry, and have a son named Cub.

=== 2005 reboot ===
In the "Threeboot", Tinya Wazzo is again called Phantom Girl. In this continuity, Bgztl exists in the same location as Earth, but is out of phase with it: the whole planet is in the "Buffer Zone" that the pre-Zero Hour Phantom Girl would phase into. Phantom Girl is the only Bgztlian who can shift between her home reality and Earth. When she phases, she is visible in both universes and often engages in conversations or activities in the two realities simultaneously.

Phantom Girl develops a strong bond with Princess Projectra, helping her cope with the recent death of her parents. Despite this, Projectra beats Phantom Girl after suspecting her of treason. Timber Wolf rescues Phantom Girl, who is placed in reconstructive machinery to heal.

=== Post-Infinite Crisis ===
The events of Infinite Crisis restore an analogue of the pre-Crisis Legion to continuity. Phantom Girl is included in their number, voted leader of the Legion as the Fatal Five reassembles to attack the group.

=== The New Age of Heroes ===
In The Terrifics series, Mister Terrific, Metamorpho, and Plastic Man travel into the Dark Multiverse and encounter Linnya Wazzo, the ancestor of the 31st-century Phantom Girl. She has been trapped in the Dark Multiverse in an intangible state. The group reaches the source of the distress signal and discover a message from Tom Strong.

In Brian Michael Bendis' Legion of Super-Heroes series (2021), Phantom Girl is reimagined to have a more alien appearance with purple skin, blue hair, and the ability to teleport.

== Powers and abilities ==
Like all natives of the planet Bgztl, Phantom Girl has the ability to turn intangible (phase). Bgztl, depending on the incarnation, either exists in or is connected to the Phantom Zone. While intangible, Phantom Girl is immune to physical harm and can maneuver through solid objects and fly under her own power. Additionally, she can disrupt the workings of electronic devices by moving through them while phased.

The Linnya Wazzo incarnation of Phantom Girl possesses a "dark matter touch" that enables her to generate combustive blasts and detonate objects on contact. She gained these abilities after being caught in the explosion of a machine in the Dark Multiverse.

As a member of the Legion of Super-Heroes, Phantom Girl is provided a Legion Flight Ring, which allows her to fly and protects her from the vacuum of space and other dangerous environments.

== In other media ==
=== Television ===
Phantom Girl as she appears in Legion of Super-Heroes.

- Phantom Girl makes a non-speaking cameo appearance in the Superman: The Animated Series episode "New Kids In Town".
- Phantom Girl appears in the Justice League Unlimited episode "Far From Home".
- Phantom Girl appears in Legion of Super-Heroes (2006), voiced by Heather Hogan. This version can extend her intangibility to others, though extensive use of this ability is potentially dangerous and could leave her unable to become tangible again.
- Phantom Girl appears in the fourth season of Young Justice, voiced by Kari Wahlgren. This version sports blue skin and red eyes.
- Phantom Girl appears in the eighth season of The Flash, portrayed by Mika Abdalla. This version is a contemporary metahuman who has been operating in Coast City as the "Coast City Phantom" while searching for her missing birth mother Renee.

=== Film ===
Phantom Girl appears in Legion of Super-Heroes (2023), voiced by Gideon Adlon. This version is a student at the Legion Academy.

=== Video games ===
Phantom Girl appears as a character summon in Scribblenauts Unmasked: A DC Comics Adventure.

=== Miscellaneous ===
- Phantom Girl appears in Adventures in the DC Universe #10.
- Phantom Girl appears in Justice League Adventures #28.
- Phantom Girl appears in Legion of Super Heroes in the 31st Century.
- Phantom Girl appears in the one-shot comic Batman '66 Meets the Legion of Super-Heroes.
