= The Lightning Saga =

Comic story arc

- Incentive variant cover of Justice League of America, vol. 2, #8 (July 2007), art by Phil Jimenez.
- Publisher: DC Comics
- Publication date: April – June 2007
- Genre: Science fictionSuperhero; Crossover
- Title(s): Justice League of America vol. 2, #8–10; Justice Society of America vol. 3, #5–6
- Main character(s): Justice League of America; Justice Society of America; Legion of Super-Heroes; Per Degaton; Ultra-Humanite; Despero

Creative team
- Writer(s): Brad Meltzer; Geoff Johns
- Artist(s): Shane Davis; Ed Benes; Dale Eaglesham
- JLA Vol. 2: The Lightning Saga: ISBN 1-4012-1652-8

"The Lightning Saga" is a comic book crossover story arc that took place in DC Comics' two flagship team books: Justice League of America and Justice Society of America. It was written by Brad Meltzer and Geoff Johns, and illustrated by Ed Benes, Dale Eaglesham, and Shane Davis. It is notable for re-introducing the Legion of Super-Heroes in the post-Infinite Crisis era.

This crossover would also be the beginning of DC's three year reinvention of the Legion, with the next part occurring in the Action Comics story "Superman and the Legion of Super-Heroes" and culminating in Final Crisis: Legion of Three Worlds.

== Plot ==
A captured villain, Trident, is under the control of a Starro drone. Batman performs a DNA scan and discovers that he is Karate Kid of the Legion of Super-Heroes. Karate Kid awakens and fights Batman until Black Lightning steps in. Meanwhile, Starman reveals to the JSA that he is also from the future.

Batman, Sandman, and Geo-Force visit Arkham Asylum, where Doctor Destiny is manipulating Dream Girl into creating horrific illusions. Starman frees her by saying "Lightning Lad" in Interlac. Dream Girl then reveals that there are other Legionnaires in the present, and the JSA and JLA work together to find them.

Superman, Stargirl, Cyclone, and Red Tornado go to the Fortress of Solitude and free Wildfire, who has been frozen among statues of the Legionnaires. At the Batcave, Batman, Starman, and Black Lightning talk to Karate Kid, who insists that he is a member of the Trident Guild until Starman restores his memory.

Jay Garrick, Vixen, Hal Jordan, Ted Grant, and Tomcat enter Gorilla City, where they find Timber Wolf. Meanwhile, Red Arrow, Power Girl, Hawkman, and Hawkgirl head to Thanagar to find Dawnstar, but find that she has already left for Earth. The Legionnaires retrieve miniature lightning rods from Batman's utility belt and plan for one member to die to resurrect someone.

The JSA and JLA converge at the old Secret Society of Super Villains base in Slaughter Swamp to find the final Legionnaire and are attacked by Computo. Despite the Society and League's efforts, the Legion enacts their plan, retrieving Wally West, Linda Park, and their two children from the Speed Force. Karate Kid is chosen to be sacrificed, but survives. The Legionnaires return to the future, with Starman, Karate Kid, and Triplicate Girl remaining in the 21st century. A close-up of Karate Kid's lightning rod shows it to have someone trapped inside.

== Aftermath ==
The Lightning Saga contains a subplot in which the Ultra-Humanite's brain is transferred to a second albino ape body. These events are continued in Booster Gold (vol. 2), where Ultra-Humanite, Despero, and Per Degaton plot to erase the heroes of the present by tampering with the past.

The All-Flash one-shot reveals that the Rogues killed Bart Allen during The Lightning Saga. He is later resurrected in Final Crisis.

Karate Kid and Triplicate Girl's exploits in the 21st century are detailed in Countdown to Final Crisis.

== Collected editions ==
The Lightning Saga and three issues of Justice League of America (#0, 11–12) were collected in the hardcover volume Justice League of America Volume 2: The Lightning Saga (ISBN 1-4012-1652-8), which was released in 2008. The collection features a written introduction by actor and comedian Patton Oswalt.

The story has since been republished in a deluxe edition hardcover collecting all of Meltzer's run on Justice League of America, as well as the third volume of the JSA Omnibus, which collects all of Johns' JSA issues through 2009.
