= Thom Kallor =

DC Comics superhero

- Thom Kallor as the new Starman, from the textless cover of Justice Society of America #2 (March 2007). Art by Alex Ross.

Publication information
- Publisher: DC Comics
- First appearance: Adventure Comics #282 (March 1961)
- Created by: Otto Binder; George Papp

In-story information
- Alter ego: Thom Kallor
- Species: Xanthuan
- Place of origin: Xanthu (31st century)
- Team affiliations: Legion of Super-Heroes; Legion of Substitute Heroes; Uncanny Amazers; Justice Society of America; Justice League
- Notable aliases: Star Boy, Danny Blaine, Sir Prize, Starman
- Abilities: Density manipulation; Hand-to-hand combat

Thom Kallor is a superhero appearing in comic books published by DC Comics, primarily as a member of the Legion of Super-Heroes. The character has also been known as Star Boy and Starman.

Kallor as Star Boy has appeared in various media outside comics, primarily those featuring the Legion of Super-Heroes. He is voiced by Bumper Robinson in Legion of Super Heroes (2006) and Elyes Gabel in Justice League vs. the Fatal Five.

== Publication history ==
Thom Kallor first appeared in Adventure Comics #282 and was created by Otto Binder and George Papp.

== Fictional character biography ==
=== Legion of Super-Heroes ===
Bronze Age version of Star Boy on the cover of Legion of Super-Heroes vol. 2, #306 (December 1983), art by Keith Giffen and Larry Mahlstedt.

Star Boy is a member of the Legion of Super-Heroes, a group of young heroes living a millennium in the future. He was born to astronomer parents on an observation satellite orbiting the planet Xanthu, and is able to temporarily increase the mass of an object, up to the mass of a star. Although he temporarily acquires Kryptonian-level powers similar to those of Superboy after being caught in the tail of a comet, these eventually fade, leaving only his original density-increasing power. Early in his Legion career, he travels to the 20th century to meet Superboy. While he is there, Lana Lang threatens to expose his identity (a secret on Xanthu) if he refuses to pretend to be her boyfriend, to make Superboy jealous. However, the Boy of Steel overhears her and her plan fails.

Star Boy is expelled from the Legion for killing his girlfriend Dream Girl's ex-boyfriend Kenz Nuhor in self-defense, in violation of the Legion's rule against killing. After this, he and Dream Girl join the Legion of Substitute Heroes before returning to the Legion. Although Star Boy originally wears a purple uniform with a white cape and five-pointed yellow star on his chest, his best-known costume is a full-body suit with a pattern resembling a starfield.

=== Post-Zero Hour ===
After the events of Zero Hour and the death of Kid Quantum (James Cullen), Xanthu's original representative to the Legion, Star Boy joins the Legion. He does not get along with Leviathan, partly because Leviathan blames himself for Kid Quantum's death and sees his replacement as a reminder of his failure as a leader.

When Xanthu leaves the United Planets, Star Boy and fellow Xanthian Legionnaires Kid Quantum (Jazmin Cullen) and Monstress spread the word that the government of their home planet has been deceived and are astonished at the decision to remain with the Affiliated Planets.

=== 2005 reboot ===
Kallor in the Legion's 2005 reboot, art by Barry Kitson.

Although Star Boy was originally depicted as a white Xanthian, Mark Waid's 2005 Legion reboot recasts the character as black. He is described as Cosmic Boy's right-hand man, and remains loyal to him during the Legion until his disappearance at the end of the Dominators storyline. This version of Star Boy (and his version of the Legion) inhabits Earth-Prime, the home of hero-turned-villain Superboy-Prime.

In Justice Society of America volume three, a separate version of Thom Kallor similar to his pre-Crisis incarnation appears, having traveled to the present day. He is diagnosed with borderline schizophrenia, which he began displaying symptoms of shortly after gaining his abilities. Gog soon restores Kallor's sanity, after which he leaves the sanatorium he had been treated at and begins working as a gravedigger, which he believes will help him carry out his mission. During a battle with the Justice Society Infinity of Earth-2, it is revealed that Kallor's suit was designed by Brainiac 5 and two of his alternate universe counterparts and is a map of the multiverse.

In Final Crisis: Legion of 3 Worlds, it is revealed that Starman was sent to the 21st century to retrieve Superboy's corpse and resurrect him using a regeneration chamber in the Fortress of Solitude. At the end of the series, Starman remains in the 21st century to carry out the will of R. J. Brande.

=== The New 52 ===
Thom Kallor reappears on the Legion roster following the events of Flashpoint. He later leaves the team to rescue Dream Girl from the Dominators after she and Brainiac 5 are kidnapped.

In Doomsday Clock, Star Boy is among the Legion members who appear in the present after Doctor Manhattan undoes his alterations to the timeline, restoring the Legion of Super-Heroes and the Justice Society of America.

== Powers and abilities ==
Thom Kallor can temporarily increase the mass and density of any object or person. The version of Thom Kallor working with the Justice Society of America can travel between universes using a combination of his density manipulation and his uniform, a map of the multiverse created by Brainiac 5. In addition, Kallor can use his density manipulation to create a black hole.

Kallor is also skilled at hand-to-hand combat.

=== Equipment ===
As a member of the Legion of Super-Heroes, Thom utilizes a Legion Flight Ring, which enables him to fly and survive in space and other dangerous environments.

== In other media ==
- Thom Kallor as Star Boy, based on the "Threeboot" incarnation, appears in Legion of Super Heroes, voiced by Bumper Robinson.
- Thomas Kallor as Star Boy, based on the post-Infinite Crisis incarnation, appears in Justice League vs. the Fatal Five, voiced by Elyes Gabel. This version suffers from a form of schizophrenia and takes medication despite it no longer working. After accidentally traveling back in time to the 21st century while trying to stop the Fatal Five, Kallor loses his medication and most of his memories and is incarcerated in Arkham Asylum. However, he escapes after seeing the Fatal Five on the news, which triggers some of his memories. He later encounters the Justice League and Jessica Cruz and befriends the latter before sacrificing himself to stop Emerald Empress from destroying the sun.
- Thom Kallor as Star Boy appears as a character summon in Scribblenauts Unmasked: A DC Comics Adventure.
- Thom Kallor as Star Boy appears in the one-shot comic Batman '66 Meets the Legion of Super-Heroes.
