= Kid Quantum =

DC Comics character

- The Jazmin Cullen incarnation of Kid Quantum as depicted in The Legion #15 (February 2003). Art by Kevin Walker (penciller), Andy Lanning and Simon Coleby (inkers), and Jason Wright (colorist).

Publication information
- Publisher: DC Comics
- First appearance: (James); Legion of Super-Heroes vol. 4 #33 (September 1992) (Jazmin); Legion of Super-Heroes vol. 4 #82 (July 1996)
- Created by: Tom Bierbaum; Mary Bierbaum; David A. Williams

In-story information
- Alter ego: Protean; James Cullen; Jazmin Cullen
- Species: Xanthuan
- Place of origin: Xanthu (31st century)
- Team affiliations: (All); Legion of Super-Heroes (James, Jazmin); Amazers
- Abilities: (Protean); Shape-shifting; Telepathy (deactivated as "James Cullen"); Ability to create stasis fields (James); Ability to create stasis fields (externally augmented) (Jazmin); Ability to create stasis fields

Kid Quantum is the name of three superheroes appearing in comic books published by DC Comics, primarily as members of the Legion of Super-Heroes.

== Fictional character biographies ==
=== Original ===
James Cullen / Kid Quantum as depicted in Legionnaires #11 (February 1994). Art by Chris Sprouse.

James Cullen, the first Kid Quantum, was retconned into the Legion's past, ostensibly as a result of a history-changing disaster. He is described as having been the first Legionnaire to die in action after the belt that he derives his powers from malfunctioned, snapping his neck. Following Cullen's death, the Legion's members were not allowed to derive their powers solely from technology. It is later revealed that Cullen is a humanoid body used by the Proteans, a shapeshifting alien species, to protect them from the villain Glorith. Rather than being killed, Cullen had gone into hiding.

=== Reboot ===
The post-Zero Hour incarnation of James Cullen shares a similar history to his original counterpart, but is definitively established to have died.

The second Kid Quantum is James' sister Jazmin Cullen, who underwent surgery to augment her powers and no longer have to use the belt. Despite initial hostility from the Legion's members, she is eventually elected leader of the team and later enters a relationship with Cosmic Boy.

=== Post-Infinite Crisis ===
In the miniseries Countdown: Arena, an alternate universe version of James Cullen / Kid Quantum appears as a counterpart of Monarch. In the final issue of the series, Monarch kills Kid Quantum and his alternate universe counterparts to gain their powers.

== Powers and abilities ==
Both incarnations of Kid Quantum possess the ability to create time-stasis fields in a limited area, within which they can slow down or accelerate time. The fields are usually no larger than a person and last only minutes.

== In other media ==
- The James Cullen incarnation of Kid Quantum makes a non-speaking cameo appearance in the Superman: The Animated Series episode "New Kids in Town".
- The Jazmin Cullen incarnation of Kid Quantum makes a non-speaking cameo appearance in Legion of Super-Heroes (2023).
- The James and Jazmin Cullen incarnations of Kid Quantum appear as character summons in Scribblenauts Unmasked: A DC Comics Adventure.
