= Dawnstar =

DC Comics character

- Dawnstar as depicted in Final Crisis: Legion of 3 Worlds #5 (September 2008). Art by George Pérez.

Publication information
- Publisher: DC Comics
- First appearance: Superboy and the Legion of Super-Heroes #226 (April 1977)
- Created by: Paul Levitz (writer); Mike Grell (artist)

In-story information
- Species: Anasazi
- Place of origin: Starhaven
- Team affiliations: Legion of Super-Heroes
- Notable aliases: Bounty
- Abilities: Light-speed flight Long-range tracking

Dawnstar is a superheroine appearing in comic books published by DC Comics, primarily as a member of the Legion of Super-Heroes in the 30th and 31st centuries. She was created by Paul Levitz and Mike Grell, and first appeared in Superboy and the Legion of Super-Heroes #226 (April 1977).

Dawnstar has made limited appearances in other media, primarily in association with the Legion. She is voiced by Laura Bailey in JLA Adventures: Trapped in Time and Cynthia Hamidi in the Tomorrowverse.

== Fictional character biography ==
Pre-Crisis version of the character. Interior artwork from Legion of Super-Heroes (vol. 3) #17; art by Greg LaRocque.

Dawnstar (her real name, she has no Legion code name) is from the planet Starhaven. Starhaven was colonized by the Pueblo people, who were abducted from Earth by an unknown alien race in the 13th century and transformed into winged superhumans. Her name is derived from the appearance on Earth of the planet Venus, the "morning star", and which is the reason she wears an eight-pointed star ornament on her forehead.

Dawnstar's parents are Mistrider and Moonwalker, and her younger brothers are Greybird and Greatfire. During her late childhood and early teens, her parents built a thriving business on their daughter's ability to guide spaceships through hazardous areas of space. She also worked as a guide to hunters of animals.

Dawnstar received an invitation from Legion financier R. J. Brande to attend the Legion Academy, and reluctantly accepted the opportunity. She was first introduced to the Legionnaires at age 16 as a recent graduate of the Academy.

She serves in many missions with the Legionnaires, contributing her talents at tracking and high-speed travel to perform many rescues of her colleagues, as well as investigations of personal disappearances and similar mysteries. Dawnstar has a lengthy, tragic romance with fellow Legionnaire Wildfire. Wildfire is an antimatter being in a containment suit, and thus has no physical body, so the two are unable to have a physical relationship.

After the Legion's timeline is "reset" by the Legion's battle with Mordru, Dawnstar is possessed by an evil entity called Bounty, who amputates her wings and forces her to use her tracking powers as an assassin. Dawnstar is later freed from the entity's control. Dawnstar vanished shortly before the Legion's timeline was erased by the events depicted in Zero Hour: Crisis in Time! (1994) and by the ensuing reboot.

Dawnstar, with her wings and original appearance, appears in The Lightning Saga, where she works with the other Legionnaires in the 21st century to resurrect Bart Allen. Although Dream Girl predicts that at least one Legionnaire will sacrifice themselves to bring Bart back, no one is killed and the Legion safely returns to the 31st century.

In DC Pride (2022), Dawnstar is established to be bisexual. Dawnstar's sexuality was previously hinted at during "The Lightning Saga" storyline, where she was shown to be in a relationship with a Thanagarian woman.

== Powers and abilities ==
Dawnstar is a mutant metahuman who can fly at faster than light speeds and survive in deep space by generating a self-sustaining force field. She has the ability to track objects and people over vast distances. As a member of the Legion of Super-Heroes, she is provided a Legion Flight Ring, which enables her to track her location and communicate with other Legionnaires.

In JLA Trapped in Time, Dawnstar is described to have powers fueled by "light energy" which is what ultimately enables them to defeat Time Trapper.

== Other versions ==
- Several alternate universe versions of Dawnstar appear in Legion of Super-Heroes (vol. 4) #105.
- An ancestor of Dawnstar, known as Wildstar is a member of the 21st-century hero team R.E.B.E.L.S., and has the combined powers of Dawnstar and Wildfire.
- Dawnstar appears in DC Bombshells.

== In other media ==
=== Television ===
Dawnstar makes a cameo appearance in the Legion of Super Heroes (2006) episode "Dark Victory".

=== Film ===
- Dawnstar appears in JLA Adventures: Trapped in Time, voiced by Laura Bailey. This version possesses additional photokinetic and healing abilities.
- Dawnstar makes a cameo appearance in Justice League vs. the Fatal Five.
- Dawnstar appears in films set in the Tomorrowverse, voiced by Cynthia Hamidi.
  - Introduced in Legion of Super-Heroes (2023), this version is a student at the Legion Academy.
  - Dawnstar appears in Justice League: Crisis on Infinite Earths (2024). Due to a temporal paradox, she and the Legion of Super-Heroes vanish as their future ceases to exist.

=== Miscellaneous ===
- Dawnstar appears in Legion of Super Heroes in the 31st Century.
- Dawnstar appears in Smallville Season 11.

== See also ==
- Nelvana of the Northern Lights - an early superhero of North American Indigenous heritage.
