= Legion of Super-Heroes (film) =

2023 superhero film

- Promotional poster
- Directed by: Jeff Wamester
- Written by: Josie Campbell
- Based on: Legion of Super-Heroes by: Otto Binder; Al Plastino
- Produced by: Butch Lukic
- Starring: Meg Donnelly; Darren Criss; Darin De Paul; Jensen Ackles; Matt Bomer
- Edited by: Bruce A. King
- Music by: Kevin Riepl
- Production companies: Warner Bros. Animation; DC Entertainment
- Distributed by: Warner Bros. Home Entertainment
- Release date: February 7, 2023
- Running time: 83 minutes
- Country: United States
- Language: English

Legion of Super-Heroes is a 2023 American animated superhero film based on the DC Comics superhero team of the same name, produced by Warner Bros. Animation and distributed by Warner Bros. Home Entertainment. It is the sixth film in the DC Animated Movie Universe's second phase, and the overall 51st installment in the DC Universe Animated Original Movies line. The film follows Kara Zor-El / Supergirl as she trains alongside the members of the Legion of Super-Heroes from the 31st century, and battles the terrorist organization known as the Dark Circle. The film was directed by Jeff Wamester from a script by Josie Campbell while Jim Krieg and Kimberly S. Moreau served as producers, Butch Lukic as supervising producer, and Sam Register as executive producer.

The film was released on digital and to home video formats on February 7, 2023.

== Plot ==
In Argo City on Krypton, Alura Zor-El has been preparing for a catastrophe her brother-in-law Jor-El has predicted will destroy the planet. The disaster strikes early, and Alura sends her daughter Kara to Earth, where she is supposed to reunite with her younger cousin Kal-El, who is to arrive in his own escape ship. Just after take-off, a fragment of the exploding planet damages Kara's pod, putting her into suspended animation and sending the vessel into a trajectory that arrives on Earth later than intended.

After her arrival, Kara - now named Supergirl - has trouble adjusting to life on Earth with its more primitive culture, and the superpowers gained from her new environment. During a fight with Solomon Grundy, she spots masked individuals lurking nearby and is rescued by Kal-El (now called Superman) and Batman. Kal-El suggests that Kara should travel to the 31st century and join the Legion Academy, a training school for Legion of Super-Heroes candidates. In the 21st century, Batman intercepts the masked individuals raiding S.T.A.R. Labs, but they commit suicide before he can question them.

Traveling to the future, Kara is introduced to the Academy by one of its trainees, Mon-El, but starts a spontaneous fight with Academy member Brainiac 5, whom she mistakes for her cousin's enemy Brainiac. While the misunderstanding is cleared, Brainiac 5 is distrusted because of his ancestry. Kara's own relationship with him is initially antagonistic as well, but as time passes, they develop a mutual understanding which eventually turns romantic.

One night, while looking for school pet Proty, Triplicate Girl spots Mon-El lurking near a forbidden high-security vault on the Academy's grounds, before being attacked and apparently killed. The Legionnaires arrest Brainiac 5 and discover that he enrolled in the Academy to penetrate the vault, which contains dangerous weapons. Brainiac 5 explains that he is trying to counter an organization called the Dark Circle; only Kara believes him and wishes to defend him in his upcoming trial, but her child-hating teacher Timber Wolf orders her to stay away from Brainiac 5 from that time on, pointing his finger at her for coming from the 21st century in the first place. After recognizing the masked figures she saw in the past from the Academy computer's files on the Dark Circle, she breaks Brainiac 5 out of confinement and learns that the Dark Circle is trying to obtain the reality-bending Miracle Machine.

Joined by Mon-El, Kara and Brainiac 5 enter the vault and overcome its security. When they find the machine, Mon-El reveals himself as an agent of the Dark Circle, stabs Kara with a kryptonite blade, and summons the rest of the Circle who overpower the Academy teachers and students. The Circle's leader appears and is revealed as Brainiac, who founded the Dark Circle in the 21st century to facilitate his resurrection (Note: Following his apparent death in Justice Society: World War II.) and has plotted for Brainiac 5 to grant him access to the Miracle Machine. Because they were incapable of passing the vault's security, the bodies of Brainiac 5's predecessors were melded into a new body for Brainiac. He claims that he has foreseen great danger approaching, and plans to bend reality to eliminate it and make himself the savior of the universe.

Kara and Brainiac 5 are rescued by fellow students Triplicate Girl (who had lost merely one of her alternate selves), Invisible Kid and Phantom Girl, who have eluded capture, and together they retrieve Dawnstar, Bouncing Boy, and Arm Fall Off Boy. After sending an SOS to the Legionnaires in space, the other students distract Mon-El and the Circle while Kara and Brainiac 5 move to stop Brainiac. They cannot prevent the Miracle Machine's activation, but Brainiac 5 turns his predecessors against their creator, causing Brainiac's body to tear itself apart. The machine goes out of control, and in her attempt to stop it, Kara summons Alura's soul. Though briefly tempted to reverse Krypton's destruction, she comes to terms with her loss and stops the cataclysm by displacing the machine into another reality. Afterwards, the students defeat Mon-El and the Circle, and the returning Legionnaires grant them all full Legion membership.

In a post-credits scene, Kara contacts Superman about her decision to stay in the 31st century and her new relationship with Brainiac 5. After the call is ended, Superman and Batman inspect a crater in Metropolis when they are hit and apparently annihilated by a beam blast. (Note: The story continues in Justice League: Warworld.)

== Voice cast ==
Voice actor	Character
Meg Donnelly	Kara Zor-El / Supergirl
Harry Shum Jr.	Brainiac 5
Darren Criss	Kal-El / Clark Kent / Superman
Matt Bomer	Barry Allen / The Flash
Jensen Ackles	Bruce Wayne / Batman
Cynthia Hamidi	Dawnstar
Gideon Adlon	Tinya Wazzo / Phantom Girl
Ely Henry	Charles Taine / Bouncing Boy
Robbie Daymond	Brin Londo / Timber Wolf; Brainiac 4
Yuri Lowenthal	Mon-El
Eric Lopez	Rokk Krinn / Cosmic Boy; Condo Arlik / Chemical King
Darin De Paul	Brainiac; Cyrus Gold / Solomon Grundy
Ben Diskin	Floyd Belkin / Arm-Fall-Off Boy; Brainiac 2
Victoria Grace	Tasmia Mallor / Shadow Lass
Jennifer Hale	Alura In-Ze
Daisy Lightfoot	Luornu Durgo / Triplicate Girl / Duplicate Girl
Zeno Robinson	Jacques Foccart / Invisible Kid; Brainiac 3

== Production ==
=== Development ===
The idea of a Legion of Super-Heroes film was conceived by Butch Lukic and Jim Krieg, who wanted to incorporate both Supergirl and the team into the Tomorrowverse. Lukic hired Jeff Wamester as director due to their previous collaboration in Justice Society: World War II (2021).

Speculation of a Legion of Super-Heroes film began in June 2022 when the Motion Picture Association gave a PG-13 rating to an unannounced film. The film was confirmed by Warner Bros. Home Entertainment the next month at San Diego Comic-Con after the premiere of Green Lantern: Beware My Power. It is the first DC animated film to be released by DC Studios, which took over development on all DC projects in November the same year.

=== Casting ===
The voice cast of the film features Meg Donnelly as Supergirl, Harry Shum Jr. as Brainiac 5, Cynthia Hamidi as Dawnstar, Gideon Adlon as Phantom Girl, Ely Henry as Bouncing Boy, Robbie Daymond as Timber Wolf and Brainiac 4, Yuri Lowenthal as Mon-El, Eric Lopez as Cosmic Boy and Chemical King, Darin De Paul as Brainiac and Solomon Grundy, Benjamin Diskin as Arm-Fall-Off-Boy and Brainiac 2, Victoria Grace as Shadow Lass, Jennifer Hale as Alura, Daisy Lightfoot as Triplicate Girl, and Zeno Robinson as Invisible Kid and Brainiac 3. Darren Criss, Matt Bomer, and Jensen Ackles also reprised their roles from previous DC films as Superman, Flash, and Batman, respectively.

Donnelly was cast as Supergirl after voice director Wes Gleason showed Lukic footage of her previous work. Robinson was allowed to improvise many of his lines during recording. He also wanted to develop his own take on Invisible Kid, as the film marked his first speaking appearance in media outside of comics.

== Release ==
Legion of Super-Heroes was released on February 7, 2023, on home media on DVD, Blu-ray, 4K, and video on demand.

This film and other DC animated films were released and labeled as DC Elseworlds.

== Reception ==
On the review aggregator website Rotten Tomatoes, 60% of five critics' reviews are positive, with an average rating of 5.3/10. Sam Stone of Comic Book Resources wrote: "Though the movie could up the ante on some of its major set pieces, it does get to the heart of what makes the Legion tick". Brian Costello of Common Sense Media described the film as "a pretty standard but enjoyable superhero animated action movie".
