= Timber Wolf (character) =

DC Comics character

- Timber Wolf as depicted in Legion of Super-Heroes (vol. 3) #42 (January 1988). Art by Greg LaRocque and Mike DeCarlo.

Publication information
- Publisher: DC Comics
- First appearance: Adventure Comics #327 (December 1964)
- Created by: Edmond Hamilton; John Forte

In-story information
- Alter ego: Brin Londo
- Species: Zuunian
- Place of origin: Zuun (31st century)
- Team affiliations: Legion of Super-Heroes
- Notable aliases: Karth Arn, Lone Wolf, Furball
- Abilities: Superhuman strength, stamina, reflexes and senses; Powerful claws and fangs; Expert hand-to-hand combatant

Timber Wolf (Brin Londo) is a character appearing in American comics published by DC Comics. He is a member of the Legion of Super-Heroes from the planet Zuun and possesses enhanced strength and agility. Brin has occasionally been depicted as wolf-like and was once mutated into Furball, a large wolf-like creature.

In other media, Timber Wolf has appeared in Legion of Super Heroes (2006) and Legion of Super-Heroes (2023), respectively voiced by Shawn Harrison and Robbie Daymond. In Legion of Super-Heroes (2006), Timber Wolf is depicted as wolf-like in his default form and can transform into a larger wolf-like creature.

== Publication history ==
Timber Wolf first appeared in Adventure Comics #327 (December 1964) as Lone Wolf, and was created by Edmond Hamilton and John Forte. He joins the team in Adventure Comics #372 (September 1968).

== Fictional character biography ==
Brin Londo gained powers from experiments conducted on him by his father, Mar Londo. Karth Arn, Mar's jealous android assistant, switches identities with Brin, but the plot is eventually revealed when "Lone Wolf" first meets the Legion. He is an early graduate of the Legion Academy. He is thought dead for six months, but is later revealed to have been kidnapped by the villain Tyr. During his captivity, he gains a more wolf-like appearance. Timber Wolf has a long-standing romance with fellow Legionnaire Light Lass; they break up due to a misunderstanding when Light Lass finds Timber Wolf embracing Saturn Girl on a frozen asteroid. In Action Comics #379 (1969), Timber Wolf battles addiction to the juice of the Lotus Fruit, which was prescribed to help him heal after he was injured in battle.

In the fourth volume of Legion of Super-Heroes, Timber Wolf is transformed into a dog-like creature dubbed Furball after being blasted with radiation by Doctor Regulus during his attempt to destroy the sun. Furball goes missing, resulting in a cadre of Legion members searching for him and Brainiac 5. They eventually discover that Darkseid is involved in a scientific process to create a demigod from a young girl, Aria. The Legion troop finds Darkseid, who has been holding Aria's father and twin brother hostage. Darkseid transforms Aria into the entity Gemini, but is angered by her unwillingness to obey him and restores Brin to his original form.

Brainiac 5 discovers that Brin is dying due to the effects of his father's experimentation, which have caused his body to deteriorate. Brin decides to wait out the remainder of his life with a small group of Legion friends that he feels are "family". Gemini attempts to cure Brin, but accidentally transports them both to the 21st century and transforms Brin into a wolf-like form.

In the Timber Wolf miniseries, Brin is discovered by a "secret" low-profile group called Point Force that recruits metahumans for undercover operations. He reluctantly joins Point Force, realizing they may be his only hope of finding and rescuing Gemini, who has been kidnapped by the Dominators. Timber Wolf is later subjected to scientific experimentation, which makes him physically wolf-like while retaining his mind. Timber Wolf returns to the future and reconciles with the Legion.

=== Later continuities ===
In post-Zero Hour continuity, Timber Wolf is the leader of the Lone Wolves gang on the planet Rimbor and a rival of Ultra Boy.

In the "Threeboot" continuity, Timber Wolf originally appears as an associate of the Legion, but subsequently gains full Legion membership. When Princess Projectra, maddened by the devastation of her home planet of Orando, blames the Legion for her loss, Timber Wolf sides with her, going so far as to cover up the savage beating of Phantom Girl at her hands.

In the crossover story "The Lightning Saga", Timber Wolf is revealed to have been transported to the present day alongside six other members of the Legion. He is discovered to have sustained amnesia and taken up residence in Gorilla City before his memory is restored using the Interlac codeword "Lightning Lad".

In September 2011, The New 52 rebooted DC's continuity. In the series Legion Lost, Timber Wolf, Chameleon Girl, Wildfire, Dawnstar, Tellus, Tyroc, and Gates are trapped in the 21st century while pursuing a terrorist. After being exposed to the terrorist's mutagen, Brin gains powerful claws that he can expel as projectiles. Flashbacks reveal that Mar Londo gave Brin his abilities to protect him from the criminal Vykor, who intended to use Mar's research for evil.

In post-Rebirth continuity, Mar Londo gave Brin his powers in an attempt to protect Zuun. However, Zuun was already devastated by the time Mar's experiments were complete. Brin joined the Legion to prevent similar disasters from happening.

== Powers and abilities ==
Timber Wolf possesses wolf-like physiology that gives him superhuman physical abilities, enhanced senses, and powerful claws. After being exposed to mutagen while trapped in the 21st century, he gained the ability to fire off his nails as projectiles, regrowing them almost immediately.

As a member of the Legion of Super-Heroes, Timber Wolf is provided a Legion Flight Ring. It allows him to fly and protects him from the vacuum of space and other dangerous environments.

== In other media ==
=== Television ===
- Timber Wolf makes a non-speaking cameo appearance in the Justice League Unlimited episode "Far from Home".
- Timber Wolf appears in Legion of Super Heroes (2006), voiced by Shawn Harrison. This version previously lived on the planet Rawl, where Mar Londo gave him the ability to transform into a wolf-like creature for use as a weapon in galactic conquest. The Legion retrieves Brin and helps him gain control of his abilities, but he retains irreversible genetic damage that leaves him unable to fully return to his human form.

=== Film ===
- Timber Wolf appears in Legion of Super-Heroes (2023), voiced by Robbie Daymond. This version is a council member of the Legion Academy.
- The Legion of Super Heroes (2006) incarnation of Timber Wolf makes a non-speaking cameo appearance in Scooby-Doo! and Krypto, Too!.

=== Video games ===
Timber Wolf appears as a character summon in Scribblenauts Unmasked: A DC Comics Adventure.

=== Miscellaneous ===
- The Legion of Super Heroes (2006) incarnation of Timber Wolf appears in Legion of Super Heroes in the 31st Century.
- Timber Wolf appears in Smallville Season 11.
