= Ultra Boy =

DC Comics superhero

- Ultra Boy and Phantom Girl as depicted in Superboy's Legion #1 (April 2001). Art by Alan Davis.

Publication information
- Publisher: DC Comics
- First appearance: Superboy #98 (July 1962)
- Created by: Jerry Siegel; Curt Swan

In-story information
- Alter ego: Jo Nah
- Species: Metahuman
- Place of origin: Rimbor
- Team affiliations: Legion of Super-Heroes; Workforce
- Notable aliases: Emerald Dragon
- Abilities: Superhuman strength, superhuman speed, flight, durability, flash vision, 'penetra-vision' (one power at a time)

Ultra Boy (Jo Nah) is a superhero appearing in DC Comics, primarily as a member of the Legion of Super-Heroes in the 30th and 31st centuries. He gained his powers after being eaten by a whale-like beast in space and being exposed to large amounts of radiation while inside. His real name is derived from the Biblical figure Jonah, who also survived being swallowed by a "large fish" (often interpreted as a whale).

Ultra Boy has made limited appearances in media outside comics, with James Arnold Taylor voicing him in Legion of Super Heroes (2006).

== Publication history ==
Ultra Boy first appeared in Superboy #98 (1962), and was created by Jerry Siegel and Curt Swan.

Alternate universe versions of Ultra Boy appears in Superboy's Legion (2001), and JLA: Another Nail (2004).

== Fictional character biography ==
Superboy #98

Ultra Boy first appeared in Superboy #98, in which he was sent back in time to Superboy's home town of Smallville to prove himself worthy of joining the Legion by learning Superboy's secret identity. In his first appearance, he only demonstrated his vision powers, known as "penetra-vision". It was implied he had malicious intentions in learning Superboy's secret identity. Later, in Adventure Comics #316, he explained that he could channel his ultra-energy to provide him other powers, though only one at a time. Later he was romantically linked for many years with fellow Legionnaire Phantom Girl. He was considered one of the Legion's 'big three' (along with Superboy and Mon-El) and served two terms as leader.

=== Five Years Later ===
Between volumes 3 and 4 of Legion of Super-Heroes, a five-year gap in the chronology occurred, during which the team disbanded. During this period, Ultra Boy proposed to Phantom Girl, but she was apparently killed in an accident. Ultra Boy separates from the Legion and becomes a smuggler and an outlaw on his home planet of Rimbor. He later rejoins the Legion after surviving an assassination attempt.

During the "Five Year Gap" following the Magic Wars, Earth falls under the control of the Dominators and withdraws from the United Planets. A few years later, the members of the Dominators' "Batch SW6" - temporal clones of the Legionnaires - escape captivity. After Earth is destroyed in a disaster reminiscent of Krypton's destruction over a millennium earlier, a few dozen surviving cities and their inhabitants reconstitute their world as New Earth. The SW6 Legionnaires—including their version of Ultra Boy—remain.

Following Zero Hour: Crisis in Time!, which reboots the Legion's continuity, Ultra Boy is reimagined as the former leader of the Emerald Dragons gang and a member of Workforce. He later leaves Workforce, joins the Legion, and marries Apparition, with whom he has a son named Cub.

In the "Threeboot" continuity, Ultra Boy is in a relationship with Shadow Lass and is trained by Karate Kid in a more responsible and tactical use of his superpowers. While on Rimbor, he was wrongly charged for a crime, which he refuses to elaborate on. Ultra Boy is cleared of this crime (revealed to be vehicular homicide) when Legion business manager M'rissy discovers evidence that proves his innocence.

In Doomsday Clock, Ultra Boy and the Legion are revealed to have been erased from existence when Doctor Manhattan altered the timeline. However, they are restored when Superman convinces Manhattan to undo his actions.

== Powers and abilities ==
Ultra Boy possesses abilities similar to Superman, including flight, X-ray vision, heat vision, and superhuman strength, durability, and speed. However, he can only use one power at a time.

As a member of the Legion of Super-Heroes, Ultra Boy is provided a Legion Flight Ring, which allows him to fly and protects him from the vacuum of space and other dangerous environments. Although he has the equivalent innate abilities, the ring allows him to forgo them and leave another of his powers available for use.

== In other media ==
=== Television ===
- Ultra Boy makes a cameo appearance in the Superman: The Animated Series episode "New Kids in Town" (1998).
- Ultra Boy makes a cameo appearance in the Justice League Unlimited episode "Far from Home" (2006).
- Jo Nah / Ultra Boy appears in Legion of Super Heroes (2006), voiced by James Arnold Taylor.

=== Video games ===
Ultra Boy appears as a character summon in Scribblenauts Unmasked: A DC Comics Adventure.

=== Miscellaneous ===
- Ultra Boy appears in Adventures in the DC Universe #10.
- Ultra Boy appears in Batman '66 Meets the Legion of Super-Heroes.
