= Luornu Durgo =

DC Comics character

- Luornu Durgo as Triplicate Girl, as depicted in Legion of Super-Heroes (vol. 5) #3 (April 2005). Art by Barry Kitson.

Publication information
- Publisher: DC Comics
- First appearance: Action Comics #276 (May 1961)
- Created by: Jerry Siegel; Jim Mooney

In-story information
- Alter ego: Triplicate Girl
- Species: Carggite
- Place of origin: Cargg
- Team affiliations: Legion of Super-Heroes
- Notable aliases: Duo Damsel; Triad; Una; Duplicate Damsel; Duplicate Girl
- Abilities: Able to divide into three bodies Mastery of Trijitsu; Basic hand-to-hand combatant

Luornu Durgo is a superhero appearing in DC Comics, primarily as a member of the Legion of Super-Heroes in the 30th and 31st centuries. Durgo was originally known as Triplicate Girl, derived from her ability to split into three bodies. After one of her three selves was killed in battle, Durgo became known as Duo Damsel. Durgo's third self was resurrected in later reboots of the Legion's continuity, in which she is also known as Triad and Una. In the Threeboot continuity, Durgo can create many clones of herself and is known as Duplicate Damsel and Duplicate Girl.

Luornu Durgo has appeared in various media outside comics, primarily those featuring the Legion of Super-Heroes. She is voiced by Kari Wahlgren in Legion of Super Heroes (2006) and Daisy Lightfoot in Legion of Super-Heroes (2023).

== Publication history ==
Luornu Durgo first appeared in Action Comics #276 (May 1961) and was created by producer Jerry Siegel and Jim Mooney.

== Fictional character biography ==
=== Original continuity ===
Luornu Durgo, codenamed Triplicate Girl, first appeared in Action Comics #276, written by Jerry Siegel. She originates from the planet Cargg, which orbits a triple star system, with all Carggites being able to split into three identical bodies. Luornu is the fourth hero to join the Legion of Super-Heroes and its first non-founding member.

One of her three bodies was killed by Computo, a rogue robot created by Brainiac 5, with the remaining two becoming known as Duo Damsel. Duo Damsel later donned a unique half orange, half purple costume which could divide with her, leaving each duplicate with a costume of one color.

In later appearances, Luornu and Bouncing Boy marry and leave the Legion due to a law that prevents members from being married. The two become instructors at the Legion Academy.

Luornu suffered the death of one of her two remaining bodies battling the Time Trapper. It was revealed that Luornu's second body was still alive. This body, and the ability to duplicate herself, were restored to her, and she gained a new ability to generate force fields. This new ability was transferred to her by a special force field belt created by Brainiac 5 to protect her after the supposed death of her second body.

During the "Five Year Gap" following the Magic Wars, Earth falls under the control of the Dominators and withdraws from the United Planets. A few years later, the members of the Dominators' "Batch SW6" - temporal clones of the Legionnaires - escape captivity. After Earth is destroyed in a disaster reminiscent of the destruction of Krypton over a millennium earlier, a few dozen surviving cities and their inhabitants reconstitute their world as New Earth. The SW6 Legionnaires remained, and their version of Triplicate Girl assumed the code name Triad.

=== Zero Hour reboot ===
A new version of Luornu is introduced following Zero Hour: Crisis in Time!, which reboots the Legion's continuity. This version's bodies possess distinct personalities, which is not common among Carggites and considered a defect. As such, her father left when she was a young child, and her mother became alcoholic and eventually committed suicide. Luornu was raised by her grandmother, who secretly had the same condition. Following her grandmother's death, Luornu was placed in an asylum, where she was tormented in an attempt to make her act normal. After she began to show signs of "progress", Luornu was allowed into the asylum's garden, where she escaped by climbing out of the garden. Luornu later encountered R. J. Brande, who employed her at his office and became her legal guardian.

=== "Threeboot" ===
In the "Threeboot" continuity, Luornu Durgo is the only inhabitant of the planet Cargg. Her origin is a mystery. All she recalls is waking up alone amongst the ruins of her planet. After weeks of loneliness, she discovers that she has the ability to create large amounts of clones, with each having a shared consciousness. When a United Planets craft arrives on Cargg, three of the replicates are sent out as emissaries. When they return, the other replicates consider them "tainted", because they had differentiated themselves from the other clones through their experiences. The three were exiled and join the Legion as Triplicate Girl.

At the conclusion of "The Lightning Saga", a shadowy figure appears to Karate Kid as he prepares to return to the 31st century with his fellow Legionnaires, and tells him that he still has a mission to complete. This figure is revealed to be Luornu Durgo, who is now known as Una and joins Karate Kid on his mission in the past. Karate Kid later contracts an unknown illness, which he investigates alongside Una. Elias Orr tells them that Karate Kid's illness is similar to the OMAC virus and suggests that they see Buddy Blank.

Karate Kid and Una meet Blank and his grandson, who take them to see Brother Eye. It scans Karate Kid and directs the group to Blüdhaven, where it detects a similar viral strain. Shortly afterward, Brother Eye transforms Una into an OMAC, who mortally wounds Karate Kid. Upon Karate Kid's death, the Morticoccus virus in his body is released and enters the atmosphere, turning humans savage and mutating animals into anthropomorphic forms. Una helps Blank retrieve his grandson and sacrifices herself to defend the two from mutated rats.

=== Legion of 3 Worlds ===
In the final issue of Final Crisis: Legion of 3 Worlds, Luornu returns to assist the Legion in battle with the Legion of Super-Villains, revealing that she has gained the ability to create vast numbers of duplicate bodies and now goes by the name "Duplicate Damsel". The version of Luornu who previously died is revealed to be the last of her original duplicates.

=== DC Rebirth ===
In Doomsday Clock, Doctor Manhattan is revealed to have altered the timeline of the DC universe, erasing Triplicate Girl, the Legion of Super-Heroes, and the Justice Society of America from existence. The two groups are resurrected when Superman convinces Manhattan to restore the timeline. In Brian Michael Bendis' Legion of Super-Heroes reboot, the character is reimagined as possessing a pink, yellow, and blue color scheme.

== Powers and abilities ==
Triplicate Girl has the ability to multiply into three identical bodies. When Triplicate Girl merges into one body, she gains the memories and knowledge that her multiple selves obtained. Furthermore, she is a master of the martial art of "Tri-Jistu", using her three bodies to maximize her fighting prowess.

In the "Threeboot" and New Earth continuities, Triplicate Girl can create an unlimited amount of clones.

As a member of the Legion of Super-Heroes, Luornu is provided a Legion Flight Ring, which allows her to fly and protects her from the vacuum of space and other dangerous environments.

== In other media ==
=== Television ===
- Luornu Durgo as Triplicate Girl makes a non-speaking cameo appearance in the Superman: The Animated Series episode "New Kids In Town".
- Luornu Durgo as Triplicate Girl and Duo Damsel appears in Legion of Super Heroes (2006), voiced by Kari Wahlgren. This version sports Triad's white/orange/purple coloration. At the beginning of the second season, Durgo's white self is killed after Imperiex alters the past, creating an antimatter wave that destroys her and Superman X's timeline. In the series finale "Dark Victory", Durgo is resurrected after Imperiex is killed, which restores the timeline.

=== Film ===
- Luornu Durgo as Triplicate Girl appears in Legion of Super-Heroes (2023), voiced by Daisy Lightfoot. This version is a trainee of the Legion Academy who loses a third of herself while fighting Mon-El and the Dark Circle.
- The Legion of Super Heroes (2006) incarnation of Luornu Durgo / Triplicate Girl makes a non-speaking cameo appearance in Scooby-Doo! and Krypto, Too!.

=== Video games ===
Luornu Durgo as Triplicate Girl appears as a character summon in Scribblenauts Unmasked: A DC Comics Adventure.

=== Miscellaneous ===
- Luornu Durgo as Triad appears in Adventures in the DC Universe #10.
- The Legion of Super Heroes (2006) incarnation of Luornu Durgo / Triplicate Girl appears in Legion of Super Heroes in the 31st Century.
- Luornu Durgo as Duplicate Girl appears in the one-shot comic Batman '66 Meets the Legion of Super-Heroes.

== Reception ==
Luornu Durgo was ranked 33rd in Comics Buyer's Guide's 100 Sexiest Women in Comics list.
