= The Legion Academy =

Fictional school in DC universe for superheroes

- Legion Academy students Comet Queen, Chemical Kid, and Dragonwing as depicted in Adventure Comics #524 (May 2011). Art by Phil Jimenez (penciler), Andy Lanning (inker), and Steve Wands (letterer).
- First appearance: Adventure Comics #371 (August 1968)
- Created by: Jim Shooter; Curt Swan

In-universe information
- Locations: Montauk Point, Metropolis
- Publisher: DC Comics

The Legion Academy is a training school for members of the Legion of Super-Heroes. It was created by Jim Shooter and Curt Swan, and has been re-used and revisited by subsequent creators in the many evolving iterations of the Legion that have been published over the decades.

Known students include Chemical Kid, Chemical King, Comet Queen, Crystal Kid, Dawnstar, Dragonwing, Glorith, Nightwind, Gravity Kid, Karate Kid (Myg), Lamprey, Laurel Kent, Magnetic Kid, Mandalla, Mentalla, Power Boy, Shadow Kid, Tellus, Timber Wolf, Variable Lad, Visi-Lad, Westerner, and Urk.

In more recent stories, the Academy is run by long-term Legionnaires Duplicate Damsel and Bouncing Boy, a couple who take on quasi-parental roles with the students. Also assisting is Night Girl, a former member of the Legion of Substitute Heroes. The most recent cast included a mix of older and new characters, including Power Boy, Gravity Kid, Chemical Kid, Variable Lad, Glorith, and Dragonwing.

== In other media ==
- The Legion Academy appears in Legion of Super Heroes (2006).
- The Legion Academy appears in Legion of Super-Heroes (2023).
