= Salu Digby =

DC comics superheroine

Shrinking Violet
- Salu Digby as Violet, as depicted in Legion of Super-Heroes Secret Files and Origins (vol. 4) #1 (January 1998). Art by Philip Moy, Ray Kryssing, and Tom McCraw.

Publication information
- Publisher: DC Comics
- First appearance: Action Comics #276 (May 1961)
- Created by: Jerry Siegel; Jim Mooney

In-story information
- Alter ego: Salu Digby
- Species: Imskian
- Place of origin: Imsk
- Team affiliations: Legion of Super-Heroes
- Notable aliases: Atom Girl; Virus; LeViathan; Veye; Violet
- Abilities: Size manipulation; Flight via ring

Salu Digby, also known as Shrinking Violet, Violet, and Atom Girl, is a superheroine appearing in DC Comics, primarily as a member of the Legion of Super-Heroes in the 30th and 31st centuries. She is from the planet Imsk and has the power to shrink to tiny size, as do all Imsk natives.

== Publication history ==
Shrinking Violet first appeared in Action Comics #276, and was created by writer Jerry Siegel and artist Jim Mooney.

== Fictional character biography ==
=== Zero Hour ===
==== Pre-Zero Hour ====
In the original pre-Zero Hour: Crisis in Time! continuity, Salu Digby is the thirteenth person to join the Legion of Super-Heroes. At the same tryout, Supergirl and Brainiac 5 join the Legion. Shrinking Violet joins the Legion later, as do her fellow applicants Sun Boy and Bouncing Boy. Despite her shyness, Shrinking Violet, known as Vi to her teammates, serves as an exemplary Legionnaire. She becomes romantically involved with Duplicate Boy of the Heroes of Lallor.

Years later, Violet is kidnapped by Imsk radicals and replaced in the Legion by Yera Allon, a Durlan who uses her shapeshifting abilities to assume Violet's identity. Legion deputy leader Element Lad and Science Police liaison Shvaughn Erin become suspicious of the fake Violet when Yera suddenly falls in love with Colossal Boy, who harbored an unrequited crush on the real Violet for years. Yera's charade is exposed and the real Violet is rescued. After returning to active duty, Violet breaks up with Duplicate Boy and enters a short-term romantic relationship with Sun Boy.

During the "Five Year Later" storyline, it is implied that Violet is in a lesbian relationship with Ayla Ranzz. After the Legion's disintegration in the aftermath of the Paul Levitz-written era, Violet returns to Imsk and is drafted to fight in a war against Braal, the home planet of Cosmic Boy. This ends with the Battle of Venado Bay, during which she rescues Cosmic Boy from her own comrades. Delirious with pain, Cosmic Boy does not recognize Violet and attacks her, blinding her in her right eye and leaving a scar along her face. The two later reconcile and Violet has her eye repaired, but keeps the scar as a reminder.

In the "Legion on the Run" storyline, she operates under the alias Virus, as Legion leader.

During the "Five Year Gap" following the Magic Wars, Earth falls under the control of the Dominators and withdraws from the United Planets. "Batch SW6", a group of temporal clones of the Legionnaires, escapes captivity, with a clone of Violet being among them.

==== Post-Zero Hour ====
In post-Zero Hour continuity, Violet originally joined the Legion (as Shrinking Violet) after helping apprehend Micro, a Legion applicant who murdered one of the other applicants, Ion. Violet later encounters the Emerald Eye of Ekron, which corrupts her with power and enables her to become leader of the Legion. After being freed from the Emerald Eye's control, Violet gains the deceased Leviathan's growing powers in addition to her own. Since then, she has alternated between using the codename LeViathan in tribute to him, and simply being known as Violet.

=== "Threeboot" continuity (2004–2009) ===
In this continuity, Shrinking Violet is also known as Atom Girl, a myth to all but the founding Legion members. She is considered a joke by the second wave of Legionnaires, until Brainiac 5 reveals her in the battle against Elysion of Terror Firma.

=== Post-Infinite Crisis ===
The events of the Infinite Crisis miniseries restore an analogue of the pre-Crisis Legion to continuity. In this continuity, which is a version of the "original" Legion had all of the retcons and manipulation of the timeline not occurred, Shrinking Violet is still at odds with Yera Allon, who joined the Legion as Chameleon Girl. It is revealed that her relationship with Lightning Lass from the Five Year Later gap had been incorporated into the main continuity and they are a lesbian couple.

== Powers and abilities ==
As Shrinking Violet or Violet, Salu Digby has the ability to vary her size. Originally, she could only shrink (down to subatomic sizes, if necessary). In the post-Zero Hour reboot, the Emerald Eye gave her Leviathan's power to grow to giant sizes as well. As Violet, Salu possesses expertise in espionage and unarmed combat. As a member of the Legion of Super-Heroes, she wields a Legion Flight Ring, which allows her to fly in both the vacuum of space and other dangerous environments, and was modified by Brainiac 5 to change size alongside her.

== In other media ==
- Salu Digby as Shrinking Violet appears in Legion of Super Heroes, voiced by Kari Wahlgren. This version sports a more alien appearance with pale skin and purple eyes.
- Salu Digby as Shrinking Violet appears as a character summon in Scribblenauts Unmasked: A DC Comics Adventure.
- Salu Digby as Shrinking Violet appears in Adventures in the DC Universe #10.
- Salu Digby as Shrinking Violet appears in Legion of Super Heroes in the 31st Century.
- Salu Digby as Shrinking Violet appears in Batman '66 Meets the Legion of Super-Heroes.
