= Final Crisis: Legion of 3 Worlds =

Comic book series

- Cover of Final Crisis: Legion of 3 Worlds collected edition (October 2010), art by George Pérez.

Publication information
- Publisher: DC Comics
- Schedule: Irregular
- Format: Limited series
- Genre: Superhero
- Publication date: August 2008 – September 2009
- No. of issues: 5
- Main character(s): Superman; Legion of Super-Heroes; Superboy-Prime; Time Trapper; Legion of Super-Villains; Sodam Yat; Kid Flash (Bart Allen); Superboy (Kon-El)

Creative team
- Written by: Geoff Johns
- Penciller: George Pérez
- Inker: Scott Koblish
- Letterer: Nick Napolitano
- Colorist: Hi-Fi Colour
- Editor(s): Eddie Berganza; Adam Schlagman

Collected editions
- Hardcover: ISBN 1-4012-2324-9
- Paperback: ISBN 1401223257

Final Crisis: Legion of 3 Worlds is a five-issue 2008 limited series produced by DC Comics. The series is a tie-in to Final Crisis. It is scripted by Geoff Johns, and drawn by George Pérez.

The story features Superman and the post-Infinite Crisis version of the Legion of Super-Heroes, uniting them with the team's 1994 and 2004 counterparts to battle the Time Trapper and a new incarnation of the Legion of Super-Villains (led by Superboy-Prime).

This series is the finale of DC's three year reinvention of the Legion, coming after the "Lightning Saga" story arc from the Justice League of America and Justice Society of America series, and the "Superman and the Legion of Super-Heroes" story arc from Action Comics.

== Foreshadowing ==
The term "Legion of 3 Worlds" was previously used by Superman during "The Lightning Saga" story arc, describing "one of the Legion's greatest adventures". He stated that the full story of this event went undocumented because none of the Legionnaires remembered exactly what had occurred. Brainiac 5 later mentions that the adventure involved the Tornado Twins. The Legionnaire Star Boy (Thom Kallor, then a present-day member of the Justice Society of America under the name Starman) alludes to this encounter, saying that he met "another Thom and another Thom", and briefly mentions the post-Zero Hour speedster XS, stating that she harbored a crush on Superman.

Geoff Johns revealed in an interview that XS would be appearing in Legion of 3 Worlds and made it clear that this series, and The Flash: Rebirth mini-series, which he wrote with Ethan Van Sciver on art duties, would pick up threads left hanging in "The Lightning Saga": "Obviously, one of the big things in 'Lightning Saga' that we still haven't addressed is the lightning rod and what that's all about. That will be a central focus of the series".

In Action Comics #864, Batman references the appearances of the different Legions in the present (the original version, 1994 version, and 2004 version), and believes that the future is always changing.

== Synopsis ==
The Time Trapper, after several unsuccessful attempts to remove Superman from history, retrieves a time-lost Superboy-Prime and sends him to 31st-century Smallville. Superboy-Prime is enraged to learn of his minimal impact on history, while Superman remains a highly influential figure 1000 years later. Breaking virtually all of the Legion of Super-Heroes' enemies out of the space prison Takron-Galtos, Superboy-Prime leads them as a new version of the Legion of Super-Villains in a bid to destroy everything that Superman inspired, including the Legion and the United Planets. The villains travel to Zerox to recruit Mordru before continuing to Earth, killing Rond Vidar (former Legionnaire and the last Green Lantern) in the process. Meanwhile, the Time Trapper observes the assassination of Legion financier R. J. Brande.

The Legion of Super-Heroes, who are at half-strength and devastated by Brande's death, learn of the destruction of Takron-Galtos, so they summon Superman to their time for help. While Superman leads the Legion into battle against the villains, Brainiac 5 (who was forewarned of Superboy-Prime's invasion by one of Dream Girl's premonitions) sets in motion a master contingency plan against Superboy-Prime that involves recruiting three of Prime's biggest foes.

First, Brainiac 5 sends Mon-El and Shadow Lass to take Rond's body to Oa and recruit Prime's nemesis, the immortal Sodam Yat (the last Guardian of the Universe), into the war. Brainiac 5 also sends three Legionnaires back to 20th-century Smallville to retrieve a strand of hair from a young Lex Luthor and asks Starman to recover a body from a grave in the 21st century. Brainiac 5 himself ventures to the Justice League's original headquarters and uses their crystal ball to summon the Legions of two parallel universes, Universe-247 (the home reality of the 1994 Legion) and Universe-Prime (the home reality of the 2004 Legion), and recruit them to fight against the Legion of Super-Villains.

Next, Brainiac 5, with the help of his counterparts, uses the lightning rod empowered during the "Lightning Saga" story arc plus XS running on a Cosmic Treadmill powered by the various incarnations of the Ranzz twins (Garth and Ayla) to resurrect XS' cousin Bart Allen (Kid Flash) from within the Speed Force. Brainiac 5 explains that the team of Legionnaires recently sent back in time during the "Lightning Saga" story arc used the lightning rod to "bottle up" Bart's essence before his death at the hands of the Rogues.

While Kid Flash joins the battle against Superboy-Prime, Brainiac 5 and his team travel to Superman's Fortress of Solitude for the final phase of his plan. They retrieve a Kryptonian healing chrysalis that was buried under the ice for 1000 years, placed there by Starman in the 21st century. The strand of Luthor's hair is placed in the chrysalis and the device resurrects Conner Kent, a.k.a. Superboy, who attacks his murderer, Superboy-Prime.

Meantime, Superman and the three Legion founders (Cosmic Boy, Saturn Girl and Lightning Lad) are forcefully taken to the End of Time by the Time Trapper, who is revealed as an aged Superboy-Prime. The older Superboy-Prime reveals that after being shunted into the Multiverse by the Guardians of the Universe, he became an anomaly that could not be killed and later became the sole survivor of all creation. The founding Legionnaires use the Time Trapper's time portals to summon multiple Legions from across the Multiverse, who manage to knock the Trapper out.

The founding Legionnaires and Superman return to the 31st century with the Time Trapper, who faces his younger self. Refusing to believe that the new arrival is his future self, Superboy-Prime punches his future self, which causes both of them to vanish. The three Brainiacs reveal that the Time Trapper the Legion knew no longer exists as the future was reset when Superboy-Prime punched his elder self.

After the battle is over, the 1994 Legion, whose universe was lost in the second Crisis, decide to travel the Multiverse looking for other lost survivors, with Ferro naming the group the Wanderers. XS and Gates decide to stay behind and join the original Legion. Brainiac 5 reveals to the 2004 Legion that they are from Earth-Prime (Superboy-Prime's homeworld) after Universe-Prime was recreated in the second Crisis. The two Legions depart while Superman returns to the 21st century with Superboy and Kid Flash.

Meanwhile, a powerless Superboy-Prime wakes up on the reborn Earth-Prime, an analogue of the real world, and is reunited with his parents and his girlfriend Lori, who are all horrified by his actions. Superboy-Prime moves into his parents' basement while reading the last issue of Legion of 3 Worlds. He then turns and talks to the readers, insisting they knew he was meant to be Superboy before Conner. He proceeds to troll the official DC Comics message board on the Internet, remarking: "They'll never get rid of me. I always survive".

== Collected editions ==
The series has been collected into a single volume:

- Final Crisis: Legion of Three Worlds (collects Final Crisis: Legion of 3 Worlds #1–5, 176 pages, hardcover, October 2009, ISBN 1-4012-2324-9; paperback, October 2010, ISBN 1-4012-2325-7)
