= Super Powers Collection =

1980s Kenner Products action figure line based on DC Comics characters

- Type: Action figure
- Company: Kenner
- Country: United States
- Availability: 1984–1986
- Materials: Plastic
- Features: DC Comics characters

The Super Powers Collection is a line of action figures based on DC Comics superheroes and supervillains that was created by Kenner Products in the 1980s.

== History ==
In 1984, DC Comics awarded the master toy license of their characters to Kenner Products, following Mattel's "action feature" heavy Masters of the Universe toy line. The initial pitch seemed to be heavily influenced by Kenner's popular Star Wars toyline with multiple playsets dedicated to individual franchises like Superman, Batman, Wonder Woman, Green Lantern, Teen Titans, Lois Lane, and the Super Jrs. Winning the license away from Knickerbocker and Mattel in 1982 with an emphasis on action and art, Kenner devised hidden mechanisms within the figures that would trigger an action when the figure's legs or arms were squeezed. This emphasis on each figure's "super power" led to the naming of the line: "The Super Powers Collection". Each figure in the first two series were also packaged with a mini-comic featuring an adventure with a spotlight on that character. The figures also included a cut-out collector's card on the back of each package.

With his Apokoliptian New Gods characters like Darkseid judged ideal antagonists for the line, comic creator Jack Kirby received some of the only royalties of his long career for redesigning his characters for Kenner. Artist George Pérez also received royalties for his design of Cyborg and redesign of Lex Luthor. Ed Hannigan had already redesigned Brainiac in Action Comics the previous year (June 1983). Most of the other designs (and much of the packaging artwork) were based on José Luis García-López's classic DC Style Guides (other artwork used appears to be the work of Dick Giordano, who was known to ink Garcia-Lopez's art for the publications, and Mike DeCarlo). Alex Saviuk provided box art for the line save Shazam.

In all, three series of figures and accessories were released from 1984 to 1986. The line was abruptly cancelled in February 1986. Two toys pictured on the back of the third wave packages were never produced: the All-Terrain Trapper Vehicle and the Darkseid's Tower of Darkness playset.

== Tie-ins ==
Once the line was on the market, a vigorous merchandising campaign took place, with DC Comics and Kenner striving for the Super Powers logo to become ubiquitous. DC Comics produced three comic book mini-series featuring characters from the toyline, one during each year of the toyline's existence. The first series of comics in 1984 was plotted by Jack Kirby, who also provided covers, wrote and penciled the last issue, and went on to pencil the second series. (These two series were collected and reprinted in 2013 in The Jack Kirby Omnibus Vol. 2, in 2018 in Super Powers by Jack Kirby, and in 2019 in DC Universe: Bronze Age Omnibus by Jack Kirby). The third and final series was penciled by Carmine Infantino. In 1986, DC Comics published The Super Friends: Super Powers which reprinted "Bad Weather for Supergirl!" from Super Friends #37 (October 1980) along with coloring pages on the inside front and back covers illustrated by José Luis García-López of Batman and Robin and Wonder Woman, respectively. The cover of the comic reprints that of the Super Friends issue but with the addition of the Super Powers bursting stars logo.

The same year the first series was published, Federal Comics in Australia also published the original issues and the first issue of the second series but numbered it as the series' sixth issue. Beginning in 1985, French publisher Arédit reprinted the first mini-series to start off its DC Flash series. From 1986 to 1996, Brazilian publisher Editora Abril reprinted various DC Comics in a book called Super Powers for 37 issues, so far as using the Super Powers logo (or a variation of it) for the first ten issues. In 2017, the original Jack Kirby series was reprinted by Panini Brasil in Lendas do Universo DC: Super Powers. Tom Scioli produced a Super Powers back-up series in the pages of Cave Carson Has a Cybernetic Eye in 2016. Art Baltazar and Franco Aureliani created a Super Powers mini-series in 2017 as a follow-up to their Tiny Titans and Superman Family Adventures.

These comics were separate from the continuity of the regular comics featuring the characters. Hanna-Barbera also produced two animated television series (a refreshing of the venerable Super Friends concept), called Super Friends: The Legendary Super Powers Show and The Super Powers Team: Galactic Guardians. Warner Home Video used the opportunity to issue episodes of Superman, Batman, Superboy, and Aquaman produced by Filmation in 1966 on VHS and Betamax video cassette in 1985 under the Super Powers label (and also as part of the 50th anniversary celebrations of their sister company DC Comics), reissuing them again on VHS in 1996 (and were still available into the early 2000s until the end of the VHS format). At the 1984 Toy Fair, DC Comics through LCA (Licensing Corporation of America), Warner Bros licensing company, distributed a fourteen page handout with the heading "Fighting for you in the aisles, on the shelves and at the registers..." to apply the Super Powers brand to a multitude of products. This saw the application of the art and logo to the likes of lunchboxes, 3-D puffy stickers, party supplies, paintable figurines, Underoos, coloring and activity books (Secret of the Frozen City, Superman, Lex Luthor, The Joker, Batman, The Penguin, Wonder Woman, Villains, Superman and Batman, and Superman and the Super Powers), The Super Powers Anti-Coloring Book (ISBN 059070494X) by Susan Striker, Stain-A-Sticker, Justice League of America Skyscraper Caper game, sunglasses, playhouses, belt buckles, sneakers, signature stamp sets, coloring play mats, drinking glasses/tumblers, MPC model kits, soap, stain painting sets, calendars, Play-Doh sets, cube game, jointed wall figures, wrist watches, jigsaw puzzles (Jaymar and Craftmaster), Give-A-Show projectors, backpacks, gym bags, Valentine's Day paraphernalia, kites, pajamas, card games, sticker albums, sleeping bags, wall cling decorations, inflatable punching bop bags, bed sheets, clothes, windsocks, greeting cards, View-Master theatre sets, nut and fruit mix, sidewalk artist sets, temporary tattoos, SunShiners, galoshes, Nerf wrist flyers, duffel bags, lip balm, slippers, crayon sets, planners, school supplies, belts, baseball caps, flashlights, bumper stickers, pins, jewelry, embroidered patches, and posters. Kenner offered several mail-in promotions including a flexible vinyl record called The Darkseid Saga, child-size Superman plastic cape, and an 18" by 24 " color poster.

Burger King produced cup holders and meal packs as part of the promotion. I.J.E., Inc.'s Kid Vid Productions produced three See & Read books for Super Powers under their Kid Stuff line named Battle At the Earth's Core (ISBN 0876601492), Darkseid… of the Moon (ISBN 0876600704, art provided by the aforementioned Alex Saviuk), and The Battle for Apokolips! (ISBN 087660176X) available as a picture book with audio cassette, vinyl record (reminiscent of Power Records), or VHS tape (similar to Golden Book Video). I.J.E., Inc. also released a Listen 'N Look book (which included an audio cassette) for the line called The Adventures of Superman (reprinting the Golden Look-Look Book of the same name from 1982). Simon & Schuster produced a series of four Which Way books for the Super Powers line titled Superman: The Man of Steel (ISBN 0671474634), Supergirl: The Girl of Steel (ISBN 0671475665), Justice League of America (ISBN 0671475673), and Batman: The Doomsday Prophecy (ISBN 0671683128)/(distributed in the UK by Carousel). DuPont Pharmaceuticals and the National Association of Retail Druggists commissioned Super Powers: Good Health Activity Book (1986) which promoted fitness and health education for children. This black & white book went through four printings up to 1989 though later editions were titled DC Comics Super Heroes: Good Health Activity Book. The "DC Comics Super Heroes" logo would replace the Super Powers logo on merchandise when the line died out (especially in 1989 when Toy Biz reused many of the action figure molds for their DC Comics Super Heroes line). Only the toy line carried the "Collection" tag; all other merchandise would have a solo "Super Powers" logo.

Superman: The Game would acquire the Super Powers logo in later releases.

The DC Heroes role-playing modules were advertised under the Super Powers banner and featured the logo on its printed materials.

Select boxes of Heinz Superman Sugar Free Hot Cocoa Mix with NutraSweet were packaged with a Super Powers sticker. These stickers included Brainiac, Captain Cold, Lex Luthor, and three variants of Superman.

Canada Fancy Superman French Fries featured a mail-in offer for the Clark Kent action figure and a sweepstakes to win a figure from the line.

Canadian Shell Gasoline Stations offered a promotion for a coupon for a specially carded action figure from the line for purchasing 25 liters.

According to the 1984 Consumer Promotions Catalogue, Sunnyland Refining Co. Superman brand Peanut Butter would offer coupons for action figures, Supermobile, Lex-Soar 7, and Batmobile. However, the jars never appeared to surface with the promotion.

Some aspects of the line persist even in recent history, such as in 1993 temporary tattoos and eight pins (featuring Superman, Batman, Wonder Woman, and the Flash) sold by the Warner Bros. Studio Store, a 2009 calendar in Australia, comic strip-like pajamas offered at Target in 2009, underwear briefs and boxers, and school supplies. In 2011, Sideshow Collectibles and Mondo Tees offered a 24" by 36" screen print drawn by Tom Whalen featuring the characters of the Super Powers toyline limited to 250 pieces. In 2015, Huckleberry announced a Super Powers line of Otaku Mini-Posters with sixteen character posters. In 2017, Cryptozoic Entertainment released a Super Powers set of six pennants using art from the line's cardbacks. Later that year, carded Super Powers figures of Superman and Mr. Mxyzptlk are shown in the background of a panel in Action Comics #975. In 2018, peppermints were released in a Super Powers collectors tin. For the ending credits of Batman vs. Teenage Mutant Ninja Turtles (2019), a poster drawn by Jack Kirby promoting the first Super Powers mini-series of comics is parodied featuring the Teenage Mutant Ninja Turtles, Batman, Robin, and Batgirl vs the Joker, Penguin, Mr. Freeze, and Brainiac (the latter two in their Super Powers design). In April 2021, Trident Studios republished the initial twelve mini-comics in Super Powers Mini-Comics Collection - Volume 1. This was followed in August 2021 with a second volume with the next eleven mini-comics.

In February 2025, DC Studios announced an animated series adaptation of the toyline was in development with Warner Bros. Animation. Titled DC Super Powers, the series follows a group of new students at the Alliance School for Heroes—Lightning, the Flash, Plastic Man, Aquagirl, Green Lantern, and Terra—who hope to evolve their powers and graduate to become the next generation of heroes while being supervised by their principal Martian Manhunter. Matt Beans was set to executive produce the series while Michael Chang was the supervising producer.

== Lineup ==
Based on definitive style guide artwork, with moderate articulation and hidden action features, the Kenner Super Powers Collection eventually released 34 figures, eight vehicles, one playset, and one carrying case. In addition, Latin and South American toymakers introduced three characters not available in the US. In Argentina, toy company Pacipa (and later Play Ful) produced El Acertijo (Riddler), which was a Green Lantern figure in different paint. It was released in Argentina under the Coleccion Super Amigos (Super Friends Collection) brand. Brazilian toy company "Gulliver Juguetes" produced El Capitán Rayo (Captain Lightning, but anglicized simply 'Captain Ray' on the card face), and his unique nemesis 'Hombre de las Nieves' (Abominable Snowman). Though most of the nine Gulliver Super Powers characters were branded 'Super Powers Collection' (the characters that Kenner also made), the unique Captain Ray and Abominable Snowman were released under the 'Super Heroes Collection' brand to distinguish them. They were available in Colombia. El Capitan Rayo was composed from a repainted Aquaman head on a Superman body. 'Hombre de las Nieves' was a Mego Pocket Hero Hulk figure cast in white and gray plastic.

=== Series one ===
Advertisement for the first wave of Super Powers action figures from trade ads and back covers in various DC comics published titles from 1984-1985

Figure	Accessories	Description	Power Action
Aquaman	Trident	Classic	Deep Sea Kick
Batman	Removable cape	Classic (yellow oval)	Bat Punch
Brainiac		Robot form	Computer Kick
The Flash (Barry Allen)		Classic	Lightning Legs
Green Lantern (Hal Jordan)	Lantern	Classic	Ring Thrust
Hawkman	Mace, removable wings	Classic	Flight Wings
Joker	Mallet, removable coattails	Classic	Madcap Mallet
Lex Luthor	Removable chest plate	Battle armor	Nuclear Punch
Penguin	Umbrella, removable coattails	Classic	Umbrella Arm
Robin (Dick Grayson)	Removable cape	Classic	Karate Chop
Superman	Removable cape	Classic	Punch
Wonder Woman	Lasso	Classic	Deflector Bracelets

=== Series two ===
Figure	Accessories	Description	Power Action
Darkseid	Removable cape	Classic	Raging Motion
DeSaad	Removable "skirt"	Classic	Shock Squeeze
Doctor Fate	Removable cape	Classic	Mystic Spell Cast
Firestorm		Classic	Atomic Punch
Green Arrow	Bow, 2 arrows	Classic	Archery Pull
Kalibak	Beta-Club	Super Powers redesign	Beta-club Swing
Mantis		Super Powers redesign	Pincer Thrust
Martian Manhunter	Removable cape	Classic	Martian Punch
Parademon	Gun	Super Powers redesign	Battle Flight
Red Tornado	Removable cape	Classic	Tornado Twist
Steppenwolf		Super Powers redesign	Electro-Ax Chop

=== Series three ===
Figure	Accessories	Description	Power Action
Captain Marvel	Removable cape	Classic	Thunder Punch
Cyborg	Drill hand, claw hand	Classic	Thrusting Arms
Cyclotron	Removable face/chestplate	Created for Super Powers	Cyclo-spin
Golden Pharaoh	Staff	Created for Super Powers	Soaring Wings
Mr. Freeze	Removable dome		Cold-blast Punch
Mister Miracle	Removable cape, shackles	Classic	Wrist Lock Escape
Orion		Super Powers redesign	Astro-punch and Changing
Plastic Man		Classic	Stretching Neck
Samurai	Sword, removable vest	Super Friends	Gale-force Spin
Tyr	Firing gun-hand	Classic	Rocket Launch

=== Mail-away exclusive ===
Figure	Accessories	Description	Power Action
Clark Kent		Classic	Punching Action

=== Foreign, non-Kenner ===
Figure	Accessories	Description	Power Action
Riddler (El Acertijo)		Classic	Super Punch (Super Golpe de Mano)
Captain Ray (El Capitan Rayo/Captain Lightning)		Created for Super Heroes Collection	
Abominable Snowman (Hombre de las Nieves)		Created for Super Heroes Collection	

=== Vehicles ===
Name	Description
Batcopter	grappling hook, and rope line
Batmobile	classic style with rear grip and front bumper
Darkseid Destroyer	
Delta Probe One	
Justice Jogger	
Kalibak Boulder Bomber	
Lex-Soar 7	
Supermobile	

=== Playset ===
Name	Description
Hall of Justice	Carrying case and playset. Roof landing pad, elevator, jail with trap door, computer terminal seating

== Unproduced figures ==
The Tower of Darkness playset featuring the likeness of Darkseid was far along in development yet never appeared on store shelves. Featured on action figure cards of the third wave, the set was previewed at the 1986 Toy Fair.

After 10 years of chronicling the history of the Super Powers Collection, in 2003 toy historian Jason Geyer's ToyOtter website & collector James "Sallah" Sawyer revealed the never-before-seen designs for the unmade Series Four, Five, and Six, along with vehicles, playsets and a deluxe "Power Plus" figure line. Proposed action figures with supporting artwork revealed were Man-Bat, El Dorado, Quadrex/Insecta Six/Bio Bug, Shockwave, Silicon, Blue Devil, Bizarro, Creeper, Metallo, Executioner, Supergirl, John Stewart, Kid Flash, Manhunter, Vigilante, Mister Mxyzptlk, Black Vulcan, Reverse Flash, Deathstroke, Obsidian, Black Racer, Atomic Knight, Howitzer, and variants of Superman (Robot Superman and Kryptonite Superman). The Power Plus Line featured Superman, Batman, Firestorm, Cyborg, Rocketman, Darkseid, Wonder Twins, Robin, and an unidentified hawk person. Vehicles include All-Terrain Trapper, Brainiac Brain Ship, Cyborg Crawler, Fist Fighter, Jump Jet, Snooper Scout, Superman Glider, and Plasticman Car. Further, there was a golden assortment for Superman to represent his 50th anniversary with a golden repaint of Superman, the Supermobile, and collector's case. Much like how Steppenwolf was originally a mail-away figure that later formally joined the line, card art of Clark Kent surfaced, indicating the figure would have joined the line in the fourth wave. While a Catwoman action figure was long believed to be in the works, no material discovered supports its existence beyond the initial pitch of Kenner to acquire the license.

Other figures were suggested to be in development but no tangible evidence has surfaced to support their existence. Amongst these were Blue Beetle, Booster Gold, Batgirl, Solomon Grundy, Swamp Thing, Metron, Lightray, Power Girl, Dream Girl, and Dawnstar. It was suggested that the Snare Arm Swamp Thing from the Swamp Thing toyline was made from a figure slated for the Super Powers line but this was shown to be false.

The Toys That Time Forgot Volume 2 by Blake Wright featured a chapter on unproduced Super Powers toys.

== Influence ==
Prior to the Super Powers Collection, one manufacturer (in this case, the Mego Corporation) licensed both DC and Marvel characters for action figures. When the Secret Wars toy line by Mattel, came onto the retail toy scene, it was set up as direct competition for the Kenner line. These figures, similar in scale to the Super Powers Collection, introduced a competing marketing strategy between manufacturers of Marvel and DC action figures. This started the trend of Marvel and DC using competing toy manufacturers to produce their toys—a trend that continues to this day.

=== 1980s ===
==== 1985 ====
In 1985, DC Comics named Kenner as one of the honorees in the company's 50th anniversary publication Fifty Who Made DC Great for its work on the Super Powers Collection.

==== 1986 ====
In 1986, discount retail chain Zayre produced a Christmas commercial depicting Batman and Robin based largely on the earlier live action television series. However, the costumes the Dynamic Duo wore were almost exact copies of the Super Powers action figures (Batman's powder blue coloring of particular note) during what ended up being the toyline's final run on stores' shelves.

==== 1988 ====
Beginning in 1988, Hamilton Gifts produced a line of poseable dolls with stands using similar designs to the Super Powers line. Released under their Presents and, later, Applause banner, the figures ran from thirteen to fifteen inches in height and included Superman, Batman, Robin, Wonder Woman, Flash, and Joker (with the release of the Batman film, the Batman doll was repainted black). With the release of Batman Returns, Penguin and Catwoman dolls were also manufactured. Similar to Mego, Hamilton also produced other popular fictional franchises such as Marvel and Star Trek. Miniature PVC figurines were also produced based on those designs of Batman, Robin, Joker, Superman, Wonder Woman, and the Penguin (designs based on the characters in Batman Returns were also made which included Catwoman). Also in 1988, Canadian discount retail chain Zellers produced a series of animated commercials depicting Batman and Robin battling their foes in the Joker, Penguin, Catwoman, and the Riddler. The Joker and the Penguin used the Super Powers color scheme notably including the Penguin's red, yellow, and blue umbrella.

==== 1989 ====
The Super Powers line, in many ways, inspired the 1989 Toy Biz DC Super Heroes toyline in design. This line, merging with the Batman toyline (where the Batman and Joker prototypes were Super Powers repaints and some versions of those finished figures borrowed elements from the Kenner toys) would borrow design elements from many of the Kenner figures, most notably Superman, Robin, and Penguin—who were near identical copies of the Kenner Super Powers figures. In Brazil, the Estrela Batman figure was a repainted Super Powers with the Toy Biz card. Coinciding with Toy Biz's line, Ertl produced the DC Comics Superheroes miniature die cast metal figurines line using the same branding and model design. Figurines included Batman (2 poses), Superman (2 poses), Robin, Joker, Penguin, Green Lantern, Shazam, and Supergirl. In a throwback to the Super Powers line, figurines came with a collector card reprinting a classic comic book cover reminiscent of Kenner's mini-comics. Hamilton Gifts produced Christmas ornaments of Superman, Batman, and Robin using their classic designs as part of the DC Comics Superheroes line. A La Carte/Saydah also released a beach towel of Batman and the Batmobile which used the Super Powers design of the vehicle.

The same year as Toy Biz's DC Super Heroes, Comics Spain began to produce a series of PVC figurines based on their appearance in the Super Powers and DC Super Heroes lines. Released from 1989 to 1992, figurines included Superman (with two different poses), Batman (as well as a black variant based on the 1989 film), Aquaman, Flash, Green Lantern, Hawkman, Wonder Woman, Starfire, and Green Arrow. The line finished out with Batman, Catwoman, and Penguin figurines based on Batman Returns.

=== 1990s ===
==== 1990 ====
Kenner would use the Super Powers Joker's body with a new head sculpt and different color scheme for its Sky Escape Joker from its 1990 Dark Knight Collection. Elements of that Joker evolved over the years into the Dark Knight Collection's Knock-Out Joker (1990), Warner Brothers Studio Store exclusive Batman Movie Collection's Batman vs. the Joker (1997), and Hasbro's Wal-Mart exclusive World of Batman Plasma Glow Joker (2000). The Dark Knight Collection's Batcopter was also a repaint of the Super Powers one. Kenner also acquired the license for The Flash and produced a prototype until the show's cancellation saw the toyline similarly concluded (Australian company LHT re-released the Toy Biz Flash with a card using Jose Luis Garcia-Lopez' style guide art for the show). Kenner then gained the Swamp Thing license and made toys for the brand. Separate lines for Batman, Flash, and Swamp Thing would have aligned with Kenner's original pitch to make toylines for DC's different franchises.

==== 1991 ====
Kenner's 1991 Robin Hood toyline was largely made using parts from the molds of the Super Powers line, predominantly Green Arrow. Both Robin Hood figures used Green Arrow's body and figures like Little John, Dark Warrior, Azeem, the Sheriff of Nottingham, and Will Scarlett were created by combining parts of figures including Green Arrow, Hawkman, Batman, Captain Marvel, Lex Luthor, Robin, and DeSaad. Some other known molded parts came from Star Wars and RoboCop.

==== 1992 ====
Kenner's 1992 Batman Returns toyline featured a repainted Super Powers Penguin action figure to match a color scheme more in line with the film's themes.

==== 1994 ====
Kenner's 1994 The Shadow toyline employed similar mechanisms and scale to the Super Powers figures. Some collectors consider the Lightning Draw Shadow figure to be something of a lost Super Powers addition (similarly to Kenner's 1990 Snare Arm Swamp Thing).

Under its P&M brand, Gulliver released action figures for Superman and Superboy under the brand Super Powers in 1994.

==== 1996 ====
In 1996, Kenner once again began producing an expansive DC Comics toyline with Batman Total Justice. Like with Super Powers, DC Comics published a tie-in comic book. Kenner produced fourteen figures before the line ended but in 1998, several figures from Total Justice (as well as unreleased figures) were re-issued for the JLA toyline.

==== 1997 ====
In 1997, Christian M. Lagore opened Super Powers Inc. in Calgary as a carpet cleaning and moving company. The business name and its logo is a homage to the toyline.

==== 1998 ====
In 1998, CustomCon was founded as an online event to display customized action figures as if they were being presented at a Toy Fair or Comic-Con. Since its inception, Super Powers has had a dominant presence as part of the event.

=== 2000s ===
==== 2003 ====
In 2003, DC Direct produced a Super Friends line of action figures but they were based on the original Alex Toth designs rather than the José Luis García-López art that Super Powers was based upon. The DC Direct line included Superman and Lex Luthor (with miniature Hall of Doom), Batman and Scarecrow (with miniature Batplane), Robin and the Riddler (with miniature Batmobile), Wonder Woman and Cheetah (with miniature Invisible Jet), Green Lantern and Sinestro (with miniature Hall of Justice), and Aquaman and Black Manta (with miniature Manta-Sub). By 2005, DC Direct began re-releasing figures as part of their Reactivated line with Super Friends making up its third wave. Superman, Batman, and Wonder Woman were re-released in 2007 singularly with the addition of the Flash.

==== 2008 ====
Mattel's DC Universe Classics line also draws inspiration from the Super Powers figures. Several figures that were redesigned for the Super Powers line (Mantis, Parademon, Steppenwolf, and Mister Freeze) were produced for DC Universe Classics in both comic-accurate and Super Powers-accurate versions. In addition, figures for Cyclotron and Golden Pharaoh were released as part of DC Universe Classics, even though both characters only appeared as part of the Super Powers line. The Penguin released in the first wave was re-released with a new head sculpt and repaint matching the Super Powers figure. In total, every figure produced for Super Powers has also been produced for DC Universe Classics and associate lines and much of the figures set to be produced for Super Powers prior to the line's cancellation has also been produced for DC Universe Classics.

In 2014, Mattel produced a special series of DC Universe Classics-style figures for their online store, MattyCollector.Com, on enlarged Super Powers packaging. The assortment consisted of Superman, Batman, and Wonder Woman, now with color schemes matching their Super Powers incarnations, a gold-uniformed Superman, which was reportedly in the works for the original Super Powers line to commemorate Superman's then-50th anniversary, Green Lantern (Hal Jordan) recolored as the Riddler as he was in the South American line (complete with color variances in the green), and an all-new figure of Mr. Mxyzptlk. There was also a "Collect-and-Connect" figure of Kalibak in his Super Powers color scheme. In 2017, Mattel as part of its DC Comics Multiverse line produced Wal-Mart exclusive Super Friends figures for Aquaman, Batman, Superman, and Green Lantern.

=== 2010s ===
==== 2011 ====
A light-up Bearbrick based on the Green Lantern's lantern battery sold exclusively at the 2011 San Diego Comic-Con to tie-in with the Green Lantern feature film features card art based on that of the Super Powers toyline. A Bearbrick in similar fashion was produced for SDCC in 2012 for Batman, Robin, Superman, and Plastic Man, 2013 for Cyborg and the Riddler, and 2014 for Joker and Green Lantern.

Also in 2011, Downtown Bookworks released My First Batman Book: Touch and Feel by David Bar Katz in its DC Super Heroes series which employed the Super Powers design of the Batmobile and made heavy use of depictions of DC characters from the DC Comics Style Guide by José Luis García-López. Two years later, Downtown followed this with The Official DC Super Hero Cookbook: 60+ Simple, Tasty Recipes for Growing Super Heroes by Matthew Mead which used the Super Powers shooting stars graphics inside its pages. The next year, Super Heroes: My First Dictionary by Michael Robin depicted the Super Powers design of the Batmobile and Batcopter. 2015 brought the DC Super Hero Starter Kit whose logo for the box set used a variation of the Super Powers logo. The set collected four DC Super Heroes concept board books in ABC 123, Colors and Shapes, Opposites, and Busy Bodies by David Bar Katz. There were two variations of the box set art both featuring the variant Super Powers logo. Subsequently, the publisher released more books in the series in 2016 in The Big Book of Superpowers by Morris Katz and On the Go! by Julie Merberg depicting the Super Powers design of the Batmobile (as well as the Super Powers Batcopter in the latter). Then in 2017, Awesome Activities for Super Heroes by Sarah Parvis saw the Super Powers design of Mr. Freeze (misidentified as Dr. Freeze) and The Big Book of Batman by Noah Smith featured several images of the Super Powers designed Batcopter. 2022 brought Colors and Capes, Sizes and Shapes by Morris Katz which featured the Super Powers Batmobile.

86HERO in 2011 produced Super Powers brand covers for the iPhone 4. These include covers with the symbols and colors of Superman, Batman, Green Lantern, and the Flash and clear covers with José Luis García-López style guide art and a symbol stand for Batman, Superman, Wonder Woman, and Green Lantern.

==== 2012 ====
Westland Giftware produced a Batmobile cookie jar based upon the Super Powers design in 2012.

The Robot Chicken DC Comics Special logo borrows heavily from the Super Powers logo. The Super Powers Hall of Justice is used but is painted white to be more in line with the Super Friends.

==== 2013 ====
In 2013, Medicom released an advertisement for its Previews-exclusive DC Heroes Sofubi figures of Batman and the Joker using the Super Powers card art graphics as its background. Packaging and promotion for the anime Wanna Be the Strongest in the World also used a variation of the Super Powers card art for its character backgrounds. Also in 2013, Trevco Child Code produced a t-shirt entitled DC Universe that presented a multitude of DC Comics characters from the style guide art of José Luis García-López. Depicted included the Super Powers versions of Mr. Freeze, Kalibak, Orion, Mantis, Steppenwolf, and Parademon as well as Super Powers characters Cyclotron and Golden Pharaoh. 80sTees.com also produced a variation of the same collage.

==== 2014 ====
In 2014, Figures Toy Company announced production of a line based on Mego's World's Greatest Superheroes called World's Greatest Heroes but with Super Powers cardbacks including the brand's logo. The figures have a switch on their back that makes the arms fling up-and-down reminiscent of the original line. Two series were initially revealed with Superman, Aquaman, Green Arrow, and Shazam and Batman, Robin, Joker, and the Riddler. The line grew to include the Flash, Green Lantern, Martian Manhunter, Plastic Man, Hawkman, Red Tornado, Firestorm, and Doctor Fate. A carrying case for the figures was also produced for the line. Darkseid, Kalibak, and DeSaad have been announced to be in development. By 2015, Figures began production of a separate Super Friends line with dozens of figures.

Kidrobot announced Super Powers mini-figures in 2014 of Superman, Batman, Robin, Wonder Woman, Flash, Green Arrow, Shazam, and Firestorm. Singapore Post announced the DC Comics Justice League & Batman 75th Anniversary MyStamp Collection in 2014 which featured a modified Super Powers logo with the Justice League of America shield logo wrapped in the shooting star Super Powers border. The cover also included images from the DC Comics Super Powers Style Guide. Mexican retail chain Máscara De Látex produced five phone cases of DC characters with Super Powers-inspired packaging in 2014. The cases depicted Superman, Batman, Wonder Woman, Joker, and assorted DC super heroes, respectively.

==== 2015 ====
In 2015, Kotobukiya announced an ArtFX+ collection of statues based on the Super Powers toyline that included Superman, Batman, Robin, Green Lantern, Flash, Hawkman, Aquaman, and Wonder Woman.

==== 2016 ====
In 2016, Monogram produced a Super Powers line of 3D figural keychains featuring Superman, Batman, Lex Luthor, Brainiac, Darkseid, Shazam, Martian Manhunter, Hawkman, Plastic Man, Firestorm, and Doctor Fate. That same year, Huckleberry announced a Super Powers line for its Yubi's Fingerines brand. Announced figures included Batman, Robin, Joker, Penguin, Flash, Aquaman, Darkseid, Parademon, Firestorm, Plastic Man, Mister Miracle, and Samurai.

==== 2017 ====
In 2017, Decopac released a cake topper based on the Super Powers Batcopter called Batman Chase is On DecoSet.

==== 2018 ====
In 2018, Sideshow Collectibles announced the Super Powers Collection maquette series by Tweeterhead featuring Superman, Batman, Wonder Woman, Robin, Joker, Supergirl, Catwoman, Harley Quinn, Green Lantern, Martian Manhunter, Donna Troy, Starfire, Bud and Lou, Mr. Mxyzptlk, Shazam, Batgirl, Gleek, Steppenwolf, Cheetah, Black Adam, Darkseid, and variants of Batman and Cheetah. Also in 2018 at Designer Con, DKE Toys produced a limited run of twenty action figures by Bombermat Toys of BADMAL, a parody of Batman depicted on a Super Powers inspired cardback. Instead of Super Powers, the logo read "No Soy Tu Super Amigo."

Also in 2018, PinRaiders began to produce the Super Pin Powers series of decorative enamel pins. The pins based on the Super Powers action figures and sold on cards inspired by the original packaging, characters produced thus far include Wonder Woman, Superman, Green Lantern, Flash, Aquaman, Hawkman, Robin, Batman, Martian Manhunter, Darkseid, Reverse-Flash, Batman Beyond, Man-Bat, Joker, Bizarro, Diana Prince, Steve Trevor, Brainiac, Cheetah, Penguin, Kalibak, Clark Kent, Lois Lane, Lex Luthor, Giganta, and DeSaad with a multitude of variants. Batgirl, Riddler, Wonder Girl, and more variants are in development. A cork pin board in the image of the Hall of Justice playset emerged in 2021 with a Hall of Doom board on the way and Invisible Jet board teased for the future.

==== 2019 ====
The mini-series Sister Powers by Mario Wytch and Jeff McClelland from Keenspot uses a logo inspired by the Super Powers logo.

=== 2020s ===
==== 2020 ====
In 2020, Hasbro began to produce the Marvel Legends Retro 3.75 line. Resurrecting the Kenner brand for the figures, the series acts as almost something of re-imagining if Kenner had the Marvel license rather than Mattel during the 1980s (forming something of a Super Powers/Secret Wars hybrid). The line persists in 2023 with nearly four dozen figures. Brazil-based Sequela Boards has announced it will be releasing eight skateboards using art from the Super Powers cardbacks for its Sequela Powers line. Characters Aquaman, Batman, Cyborg, Flash, Joker, Robin, Superman, and Wonder Woman will be featured.

==== 2021 ====
ManOrMonster? studios announced an expansion to its Warlords of Wor line of Glyos figures in Power Tribes. Inspired by Super Powers (both in design and packaging), thirteen figures are planned with the initial wave including Power Arm (Cyborg), Swamp King Bog-Nar (Swamp Thing), Nuclear Man (Lex Luthor), and Technodemon (Parademon). This was followed with wave two in Rocket Shot (Tyr), Astro-Punch (Orion), Mister Kismet (Doctor Fate), Monsieur Fyth Dee (Mr. Mxyzptlk), and Action Archer (Green Arrow) and wave three with Atomic Man (Firestorm), Quiver (Speedy), PVC Man/Monster (Plastic Man), Benthicman (Aquaman), and Terminus (Deathstroke).

==== 2022 ====
In 2022, Boss Fight Studio announced the Power Stars toyline. Inspired by Super Powers and initially featuring characters from King Features Syndicate, including Flash Gordon and The Phantom, Power Stars uses a similar scale and appearance as its name itself is a nod to Super Powers. The line was expanded in 2023 with "Male Blank," a customizable figure. Fresh Monkey Fiction and Toy Otter similarly announced a Super Powers-inspired toyline in the Longbox Heroes Collection. Teaming with Big Bad Toy Store, buyers decided with their dollars which action figures were produced by a buying threshold. Characters included the Tick, Grendel, Goon, Madman, Cassie Hack (Hack/Slash), and Mr. Monster. The Rocketeer proved so successful, it developed something of a subline with the Black Phantom, Onslaught Trooper, Oblivion Trooper, Hellfire Trooper, Subzero Trooper, and Badlands Trooper.

==== 2023 ====
In 2023, PinForce started a Super Powers series of DC MicroHeroes pins. Thus far, the line includes the Penguin, Golden Pharaoh, Brainiac, Cyclotron, Rocket Man, and Quadrex. DeSaad, Parademon, Silicon, Mantis, and the Super Powers logo are slated for release next.

Trends International produced a poster entitled DC Comics - The Lineup featuring many of DC's characters predominantly pulled from José Luis García-López' style guide art. Included in the collage were the Super Powers depictions of Kalibak, Steppenwolf, Parademon, Mantis, and Mr. Freeze as well as the Super Powers character Cyclotron.

== Foreign production ==
Kenner Products produced figures packaged for the US domestic market and, as with their Star Wars master toy license, also sub-licensed production of the Super Powers Collection brand, characters, and toys around the world. Just as Kenner/DC Comics created the characters Cyclotron and Golden Pharaoh to augment the Super Powers franchise, so too some sub-licensees took it upon themselves to produce characters/figures beyond those available in the domestic Kenner lineup. Interestingly enough, the Smithsonian Institution sold in its gift shop in 1988 as part of its "Superman, Many Lives, Many Worlds" exhibit celebrating Superman's 50th birthday bagged Estrela Superman figures with a unique design on his cape.

Company	Territory & Notes
Kenner Products (Canada) Ltd.	Headquartered in Toronto, Canada. Beginning in 1984 they produced figures under the Super Powers Collection/Collection De Super Puissants brand on bi-lingual (English/French) cards. These cards also saw distribution in Australia and New Zealand.
Lili Ledy	Headquartered in Mexico. Beginning in 1985 they produced (locally) the first wave of figures and a toy (Lex-Soar 7) under the "Super Poderes Coleccion" brand. These cards and the booklet are printed in Spanish language.
Parker, Palitoy, Clipper, General Mills Juguetes	This consortium of four Western European toy companies commissioned the manufacture of Super Powers Collection figures on tri-lingual (German/English/Spanish) cards for sale in their respective territories. For a time, GMJ (General Mills Juguetes, SA) had their own distinct cards for Spanish distribution.
Cuick: Pacipa/Play Ful	Beginning in 1989, Cuick S.A. (Cuik S.A.) of Argentina produced figures under the Coleccion Super Amigos brand for distribution by Pacipa and Play Ful. The line is most notable for the addition of Riddler (El Acertijo), a character not available in Kenner's domestic lineup.
Estrela	Headquartered in São Paulo, Brazil, beginning in 1988 they produced figures (locally) under the Coleção Super Powers brand. Notable because although Kenner's domestic 'series three' figures did not come with mini-comics, at least some of their Estrela counterparts did (Cyborg, Plastic Man, Shazam!).
Nibo	Headquartered in Uruguay. Beginning in 1987 they produced figures under the Coleccion Super Powers brand.
Gulliver Juguetes	Headquartered in Brazil, beginning in 1987 they produced figures for the Colombian market under the Super Powers Collection and Super Heroes Collection brands on bi-lingual (Spanish/English) cards. Most notable for their creation of two unique characters/figures: Captain Ray (El Capitan Rayo, who was spun off into his own collection of 8 figures under the Defensores De La Tierra brand by P&M Grupo) and Abominable Snowman (Hombre de las Nieves, who was unique to the Super Heroes Collection brand by Gulliver Juguetes).

== Bootlegs and custom figures ==
=== Extra Powers ===
Scott Fleming of Scooter's Custom Works produced a limited line of custom action figures based on the Super Powers Collection so far as to print a color catalog of his wares advertised in the newspaper Toy Shop in the early 1990s. He hand-produced cards in the Super Powers style using bubbles from the line to attach the figures to the cards. When figures from the line appeared on eBay, they were speculated to be knock-offs possibly from Mexico until corrected by Julius Marx of Action Figure Insider who clarified the line's history. Some known figures include Batgirl, Catwoman, Kid Flash, Blue Beetle, John Stewart, Atom (Ray Palmer), Captain Atom, Guy Gardner, Animal Man, Metamorpho, Booster Gold, Black Canary, Nightwing, Aqualad, Speedy, Wonder Girl, Alan Scott, Atom (Al Pratt), Spectre, Doctor Mid-Nite, Man-Bat, Lobo, Etrigan the Demon, Black Manta, and Supergirl. Marx's figures were numbered to be of a lot of 91 produced.

=== Industrial Toy Werks ===
In 2009, several action figures claimed as a lost wave of Super Powers to be found overseas began to appear on eBay. Further, they were said to be produced by Industrial Toy Werks in Astana, Kazakhstan. Julius Marx of Action Figure Insider purchased a Mirror Master from the line and discovered it to be composed of repainted parts of the Flash, Doctor Fate, and Shazam with a custom sculpted head cast in solid resin (heavier in weight than the original line). CantinaDan, also of Action Figure Insider, bought The Dragon and learned its body was a repainted Doctor Fate with a custom sculpted head and the parts held together internally by a rubber band. The back card of the figure lists Blue Beetle, Captain Marvel (without cape), Supergirl, Gleek, the Wonder Twins, Black Lightning, The Dragon, Booster Gold, Apache Chief, Captain Atom, Wendy, Marvin and Wonder Dog, Mirror Master, Sinestro, Black Adam, Riddler, Brainiac (in Silver Age appearance), and Black Manta as part of the so-called unknown line. Figures claimed to feature either "Wind-Up and Release Punching Action" or "Magnetic Power Parts" though Marx found his Mirror Master purchase to not have the magnetic claims. A "Display Environment" called "Darksied's Fortress" [sic] was also purported.

=== Other non-licensed ===
In the Spring of 1997, a bootleg line of Super Powers figures began appearing out of Canada and Mexico packaged with a "Made in China" logo. Featuring Superman, Batman, Robin, and Spider-Man, the size of the figures were more like the traditional Mego line (perhaps going so far as to use them as a basis) and only the Superman figure was packaged with the official Super Powers logo.

== Gentle Giant ==
Toy manufacturing company Gentle Giant, who uses 3D scanning technology to closely reproduce older toys at different scales, announced in 2015 it would produce a 12" Jumbo line of Super Powers initially teasing Superman, Wonder Woman, Batman, Robin, Joker, and the Flash. Green Arrow, Lex Luthor, and the Penguin were also later announced but the latter two were never produced. So-called "prototype" jumbo Superman and Batman featuring gray figures with colored capes was produced exclusively for San Diego Comic-Con in 2016 on slim cardbacks. Micro 3" figures of Superman, Batman, Wonder Woman, Robin, Joker, Flash, and Lex Luthor were also produced (Luthor was Walgreens exclusive).

== McFarlane Toys ==
5" Figures from a Super Powers line from McFarlane Toys began to appear unannounced in Walmart stores in 2022. The initial release included Batman, Superman, and Darkseid as well as vehicles in the Batwing and Supermobile. A second wave emerged soon after including John Stewart, Batman Who Laughs, and the Flash. At New York Comic-Con, it was announced wave three including Deathstroke, Wonder Woman, and Nightwing as well as the Batmobile and Invisible Jet will be hitting stores in Spring 2023. In 2024, the series expanded with variants for Batman (gold), Superman (Lord), Flash (gold), and Batman of Zur-En-Arrh as well as figures for Green Lantern (Hal Jordan) and Sinestro (Superfriends).

Figure	Accessories	Description
Superman	Removable cape	Classic version
Darkseid		New 52 version
Batman	Removable cape	Batman: Hush version
Green Lantern (John Stewart)	Power Battery	Modern version
Flash (Barry Allen)		DC Rebirth version
The Batman Who Laughs		
Wonder Woman	Removable cape	DC Rebirth version
Nightwing	Escrima sticks	Batman: Hush version
Deathstroke	Sword	The Judas Contract version
Aquaman	Trident	DC Rebirth version
Batman	Removable cape	Classic Detective version
Robin	Removable cape	Classic version
Wonder Woman	Removable cape	Classic version Repaint of the Rebirth Wonder Woman figure
Superman	Removable cape	New 52 version
Flash (Wally West)		Infinite Frontier version Repaint of the Wave 1 Flash
Batman (Thomas Wayne)	Removable cape	Flashpoint version
Batman	Removable cape	Batman version Repaint of the previous Batman
Robin (Tim Drake)	Removable cape	Black cape and mask Repaint of the previous Robin
Nightwing	Escrima sticks	Knightfall version Repaint of the previous Nightwing
Justice Lords Superman	Removable cape	Repaint of the classic Superman
Green Lantern (Hal Jordan)	Power Battery	Classic version
Sinestro	Power Battery	Classic version
Batman of Zur-En-Arrh	Removable cape	Repaint of the Hush Batman
Kilowog		Classic version
Blue Beetle (Ted Kord)		Justice League International version
Brainiac		Classic version
Batman	Removable cape	Bat-Manga version Redeco of the classic Batman
Sinestro	Power Battery	Sinestro Corps War version Repaint of the classic Sinestro
Booster Gold		Justice League International version
Metamorpho		Classic version
Green Lantern (Guy Gardner)		Justice League International version
Batman	Removable cape	The Dark Knight Returns version Redeco of the Hush Batman
Superman	Removable cape	Fleischer shorts version Redeco of the original Superman
Black Manta		Repaint of the exclusive version
Bizarro	Removable cape and nametag	Classic version
Superman		
Batman		
Riddler		
Aquaman		
Atom		
Robin		
Lobo		
Batman		
Superman		
Flash		
Aquaman		
Black Manta		
Batman		
Robin		
Superman		Superman version
Metamorpho		Superman version
Guy Gardner		Superman version
Mr. Terrific		Superman version
Ultraman		Superman version
Supergirl		
Power Girl		
Cyborg Superman		
Eradicator		
Green Lantern		
Robin		
Batman Beyond		
Starfire		
Raven		
Black Adam		
Wildcat		
Dr. Midnite		
Batman		
Red Tornado		
Superman Blue		
Superman Red		
Harley Quinn		
Batgirl		
Superman		
Martian Manhunter		
Flash		
Wonder Girl		
Cyborg		
Deathstroke		

=== Variants ===
Figure	Accessories	Description
Batman	Removable cape	Gold repaint of the classic Batman
Flash		Gold repaint of the Rebirth Flash
Superman	Removable cape	Gold repaint of the previous Superman
Wonder Woman		Gold repaint of the previous Wonder Woman

=== Box Sets ===
Release	Figure	Accessories	Description
Q4 2023	Peacemaker		Classic version
Q4 2023	Vigilante		Classic version
Q4 2023	Judomaster		Classic version
	Green Lantern		Classic version
	Hourman		Classic version
	Starman	Cosmic rod	Classic version

=== Store exclusives ===
Figure	Release	Accessories	Description	Exclusivity
Black Manta	2023		Classic version	Walmart
Reverse-Flash	2023		Repaint of the Wave 1 Flash	Walmart
Animal Man	2025			McFarlane Toys Store
Cyborg	2025			McFarlane Toys Store
Deadman	2025			McFarlane Toys Store
Nightwing	2025			McFarlane Toys Store

=== Vehicles ===
Name	Description
Batwing	
Supermobile	
Batmobile	
Invisible Jet	
Whirlybat	
Brainiac's Skull Ship	
Blue Beetle's Bug	
Brainiac and Skull Ship (Gold Label)	Panic in the Sky version Redeco of the Skull Ship with an exclusive Milton Fine Brainiac figure McFarlane Toys Store exclusive
Batman with Batwing and Whirlybat (Gold Label)	Black repaints with exclusive Batman figure
Batman's Bat Multicraft	
Black Manta's Sea-Saucer	
Mr. Terrific's T-Craft	Superman version Comes with or without Mr. Terrific figure

== See also ==
- List of Super Powers minicomics
- Super Jrs.
- McFarlane Toys
- Kenner Products
