= Krypto =

DC Comics superdog

- Textless cover of Superman #680 (November 2008). Art by Alex Ross.

Publication information
- Publisher: DC Comics
- First appearance: Adventure Comics #210 (March 1955)
- Created by: Otto Binder; Curt Swan; Sy Barry

In-story information
- Species: Kryptonian dog
- Place of origin: Krypton
- Team affiliations: Team Superman; Space Canine Patrol Agents; Legion of Super-Pets; Justice League; Titans; Superman Family
- Partnerships: Superman (Kal-El); Superboy (Kon-El); Supergirl (Kara Zor-El); Ace the Bat-Hound; Streaky the Supercat
- Notable aliases: Supercat; Skip (pre-Crisis); Air Dale (pre-Crisis); Pal; Krypto the Superdog
- Abilities: See list: Superhuman strength, speed, endurance, stamina, agility, reflexes, senses, and longevity; Solar energy absorption; Self-sustenance; Accelerated healing; Super vision; Heat vision; Electromagnetic spectrum vision; Microscopic vision; Telescopic vision; X-ray vision; Infrared vision; Invulnerability; Flight

Krypto, also known as Krypto the Superdog, is a superhero dog appearing in American comic books published by DC Comics, commonly in association with the superhero Superman. In most continuities, Krypto is Superman's pet dog, usually depicted as a white dog of a generic pedigree, was born on the planet Krypton. He was sent to Earth in an experimental spacecraft as part of a test conducted by Jor-El, prior to the launch of his son Kal-El's capsule. Krypto possesses the same powers and abilities as Superman, a product of his Kryptonian physiology and exposure to Earth's yellow sun.

As Superman's pet, Krypto has also been in the care of other characters as Lois Lane, Jimmy Olsen, Supergirl (Kara Zor-El), Superboy (Conner Kent), Martha Kent, and in more recent versions, Jon Kent, the son of Superman and Lois. He's also an ally of other animal superheroes, such as Streaky, Ace the Bat-Hound, and the Legion of Super-Pets.

Krypto has appeared in numerous television series and films, such as the animated series Krypto the Superdog; the television series Smallville, the live-action HBO Max series Titans, the animated film DC League of Super-Pets (2022) voiced by Dwayne Johnson, and the fourth season and series finale of Superman & Lois. The character made his live-action cinematic debut in the DC Universe (DCU) film Superman (2025), and returned in the DCU film Supergirl (2026).

== Publication history ==
Krypto's first appearance was in a Superboy adventure story in Adventure Comics #210 (March 1955), and was created by writer Otto Binder and artists Curt Swan & Sy Barry. Originally intended as a one-off character, the dog attracted positive attention from the audience, and returned four issues later and became a regular member of Superboy's cast.

== Character biography ==
=== The original Krypto ===
Krypto, with Superboy, in his first appearance, from Adventure Comics #210 (March 1955). Art by Curt Swan and Stan Kaye. The interior story was done by Swan and Sy Barry.

On Krypton, parallel evolution leads to the emergence of analogous species to Earth birds, felids, canids, and simians. They are domestic companion animals as they are on Earth. As explained in his first appearance, Krypto is originally the young dog and household pet of toddler Kal-El while they are on Krypton.

Jor-El, testing prototypes for the rocket that will eventually send Kal-El to Earth, decides to use Krypto as a test subject, with the dog launched in extended cryogenic sleep. However, Krypto's rocket is knocked off-course by meteors and drifts through space for approximately ten Earth years until it eventually lands on Earth, where Krypto is reunited with the by-then teenaged superhero, Superboy. Due to the environment (Earth's yellow sun and lower gravity), Krypto possesses the same powers and abilities as his master, although his physical abilities are proportionate to his smaller size and species. Certain sensory abilities of Krypto's (senses of smell and hearing) are more acute than those of Superman, just as an ordinary dog's senses are more acute than those of an ordinary human. Krypto also has human-level intelligence, with his thoughts being represented via speech balloons. Although he has normal canine instincts, he is able to make decisions rationally and suppress his instincts to achieve Kal-El's objectives, such as preserving his secret identity. Upon being reunited with Kal-El, the reawakened Krypto understands due to his sense of scent that the now-teenager is in fact Krypto's own companion from Krypton now grown to adolescence.

Krypto is drawn as a medium-sized, short-haired white dog of generic pedigree. The early appearances of the character in the comics feature exaggerated anthropomorphic facial expressions; these are replaced in later appearances by a more generic canine face. When fighting crime, Krypto usually wears a gold collar, a miniature facsimile of the Superman's symbol for a dog tag, and a dog-sized version of Superman's cape. Whenever he is on Earth and wants to appear as an "ordinary" dog, Krypto pulls his collar and cape off, pulling it back on when necessary. In one story, he is gifted with a collar which contains a retractable cape that can be unfurled or hidden by pressing a stud.

When not accompanying Superboy/Superman, Krypto spends much of his time romping through space; while on Earth, however, he stays with the Kent family, posing as their pet dog, "Skip". In that identity, his guardians apply a brown dye patch on his back for a disguise which Krypto burns off with his heat vision when he goes into costume; later, the Kents devise a pullcord-activated dye applicator and other methods which Krypto can use to switch to "Skip" and back without assistance.

Krypto is part of two organizations of super-animals: the 30th century Legion of Super-Pets, and the Space Canine Patrol Agents. After the 1971 revamp of Superman by editor Julius Schwartz, Krypto does not appear for several years. The character returns suffering from amnesia in a 1974 two-part Green Arrow backup story in Action Comics #440 and #441. His memory is restored in 1975's Superman #287. Asked in a 2006 interview why he "liberated Krypto from the limbo kennel", writer Elliot S. Maggin said, "A man needs a dog. A superman needs a superdog."

Krypto had his own feature in The Superman Family #182 (March–April 1977) to #192 (November–December 1978), written by Bob Toomey.

=== The modern Krypto ===
==== Pocket universe Krypto ====
Following the Crisis on Infinite Earths continuity reboot, Superman's history is extensively rewritten, initially eliminating Krypto and all other survivors of Krypton. The Time Trapper creates a pocket universe that replicates pre-Crisis continuity and has a version of Krypto. While battling three Phantom Zone criminals, Krypto sacrifices his powers by giving Superboy gold kryptonite to depower them.

==== Krypto and Bibbo ====
The second modern Krypto is an Earth dog who was rescued and later named by Bibbo Bibbowski. Originally, Bibbo wanted to name the dog "Krypton" after Superman's home planet. However, the engraver of the dog tag intentionally drops the letter "n" to extort more money from Bibbo; an angry Bibbo refuses to comply and renames the dog Krypto.

Krypto becomes involved in many of the adventures of Superboy (Conner Kent). The dog is eventually dropped from the series, remaining in Hawaii when Superboy returns to Project Cadmus. After Superboy #69 of that series, Krypto goes to live at Cadmus. Along with Grokk and Angry Charlie, Krypto starts an uprising against the Agenda, an evil consortium which is influencing Cadmus at the time.

=== The dog from Krypton ===
Krypto aids Superboy against Superboy-Prime, on the cover for Infinite Crisis #4 (March 2006). Art by Jim Lee and Sandra Hope.

The third and more familiar version of Krypto is introduced in the early 2000s Superman comics storyline Return to Krypton, as a dog from a false, idealized Krypton created as a trap by Brainiac 13. Superman is able to defeat the trap, and when he returns to Earth, Krypto follows him.

This new version of Krypto has the abilities of his pre-Crisis predecessor, but the intelligence of a regular dog, leading him to inadvertently cause destruction with his powers. Krypto is for some time locked away in the Fortress of Solitude under the care of one of Superman's robots until he is properly trained.

Superman leaves Krypto in the care of Superboy, saying that Smallville's open spaces were a better place for the dog, and that Superboy could use a friend. Their relationship had a shaky start, not helped by Krypto getting Superboy in trouble with Starfire for destroying her garden. However, they have slowly developed a close friendship, in which Krypto willingly does anything he can to protect Conner. One example of this loyalty was Krypto's quick defense of Conner from an enraged Superboy-Prime during the events of Infinite Crisis, during which Conner was killed.

==== One year later ====
Action Comics #850 presents another revision of Superman's origin, containing many subtle retcons to Superman: Birthright, the latest major revision of Superman's continuity. The current version indicates that Krypto was indeed the El family dog from the real Krypton (as in the Silver Age).

Some time later, a back-up feature in Action Comics Annual #11, written by Geoff Johns, finally clarified the details of the "New Earth" origin of Krypto: "The Kryptonian canine of the House of El, Krypto was sent in a small prototype rocket created by Jor-El. Lost for years, Krypto was eventually found and rescued by Clark when he was a boy." This retcon brings the modern Krypto almost identically in line with the original Silver Age version.

Krypto goes missing for over a year following the death of Conner Kent, but Superman is unable to devote much time to search for him, having himself been without powers for much of that time. Krypto responds to the call from Jimmy Olsen's makeshift signal watch and makes his return. Krypto is quick to defend Jimmy who, along with Superman, falls under attack and is badly injured as a result. Jimmy takes Krypto back to his apartment, and nurses the injured dog back to health. Superman later decides to let Krypto stay with Jimmy when he realizes that Krypto has always preferred the company of younger people, such as himself as a child and Superboy. Jimmy gives Krypto the secret identity of "Pal", a play on Superman's Pal Jimmy Olsen.

==== Calmer ====
During the Green Lantern storyline Sinestro Corps War, Robin enlists Krypto's aid in battling Superboy-Prime, who has returned to Earth as part of the Sinestro Corps. Under Robin's command, Krypto attacks Prime with feral rage, damaging his armor, but is unfortunately beaten aside, although he buys the heroes enough time for Superman, Power Girl, and Supergirl to join the fight.

During Superman's battle with the villain Atlas, and after Atlas incapacitates such heroes as Steel and Bibbo Bibbowski, Atlas laments that he has not faced a worthy opponent. Just then, Krypto emerges vowing to "hurt this one" because he "loves man" (Superman). Krypto proves to be more than a match for Atlas, revealing Atlas' magical nature to Superman. This is the first and only story to show exactly what Krypto 'thinks', and although it is translated for readers, Krypto 'speaks' in a simplistic manner with broken English, rarely using pronouns. This story also focuses on how Superman has taught Krypto to be much calmer and well-behaved; Superman reassures Lois Lane that Krypto loves her as well. Following the death of Jonathan Kent and Brainiac's attack on the family farm, Krypto arrives on the front step of the Kent Farm, to protect Martha Kent and provide companionship.

Geoff Johns detailed Krypto's role in Adventure Comics. The character appears alongside the resurrected Conner Kent as his companion and sidekick, with a much more amicable relationship than before Conner's death.

=== The New 52 ===
In September 2011, The New 52 rebooted DC's continuity. In this new timeline, Krypto appears as a normal dog with no powers on Krypton. In Action Comics #5 (March 2012), during Krypton's final moments, Jor-El tries to save his family by opening a portal to the Phantom Zone, when suddenly the incarcerated try to escape. Krypto bravely defends the family but is sucked into the Phantom Zone.

The now-grown Superman rediscovers Krypto in Action Comics #13 (December 2012) after being pulled into the Phantom Zone by the first inhabitant of the prison. At the story's conclusion, Superman brings Krypto back to Earth. With Krypto in critical condition, Superman rushes to the observation deck, exposing Krypto to the sun's radiation. Krypto develops Kryptonian superpowers, which allow him to recover at an accelerated rate.

=== DC Rebirth ===
In DC Rebirth, Superman's previous history prior to The New 52 is restored. Krypto is seen in the DC Rebirth continuity, as the family dog of Superman, Lois and their son Jon Kent. His collar is made out of the belt of an old Superman uniform from the Fortress of Solitude, as a present from Jon.

Krypto is later seen as a loyal companion to Supergirl.

The Super-Sons annual of 2017 explores Krypto's friendship with various super-animals, such as Titus, Batcow, Streaky, and Detective Chimp.

=== Limited series ===
A five-issue mini-series titled Krypto: The Last Dog of Krypton was published by DC in 2025.

== Powers, abilities, and equipment ==
In his original pre-Crisis incarnation, Krypto possessed the same powers and abilities as an adult Kryptonian, although his physical abilities were proportionate to his smaller size and species. Certain sensory abilities of Krypto's (senses of smell and hearing) were more acute than those of Superman, just as an ordinary dog's senses would be more acute than those of a normal human. He also had human-level intelligence; the comics expressed this via the use of thought balloons indicating what Krypto was thinking.

In his current incarnation, Krypto's abilities are essentially identical; however, he possesses normal canine intelligence, though as shown in the storyline with Atlas, Krypto does seem to have a general understanding of speech, and can take initiatives of his own, such as vowing to protect Metropolis from Atlas because of his knowledge of the fact that Superman himself protects and cares for the city, as well as vowing to hurt Atlas for hurting Superman.

== Other versions ==
- Krypto appears in the non-canon story Whatever Happened To The Man of Tomorrow?, where he is killed in battle with Kryptonite Man.
- An alternate universe version of Krypto appears in JLA: The Nail. This version was created as part of early experiments in splicing Kryptonian and animal DNA.
- A 25th-century clone of Krypto appears in DC One Million.
- An alternate universe version of Krypto appears in All-Star Superman #6.
- An alternate universe version of Krypto makes a cameo appearance in Superman: Red Son.
- An alternate universe version of Krypto makes a cameo appearance in The Kingdom: Planet Krypton #1.
- A robotic, alternate universe version of Krypto appears in Superman: Last Son of Earth.
- An alternate universe version of Krypto appears in Flashpoint.
- An alternate universe version of Krypto appears in Supergirl: Woman of Tomorrow #1 and #8.
- Krypto appears in Tiny Titans and Superman Family Adventures by Art Baltazar and Franco Aureliani. Though his earlier appearances in Tiny Titans have him designed as a puppy, he appears older, taller, and with blue eyes in later issues and in Superman Family Adventures.
- Krypto appears in DC x Sonic the Hedgehog: Metal Legion.

== In other media ==
=== Television ===
- Krypto appears in The Adventures of Superboy.
- An animatronic toy of Krypto appears in the Batman: The Animated Series episode "Deep Freeze".
- Krypto appears in the Superman: The Animated Series episode "The Last Son of Krypton: Part 1". Additionally, in the episode "Bizarro's World", Bizarro adopts a reptilian alien from the Fortress of Solitude that he names Krypto.
- A dream world incarnation of Krypto appears in the Justice League Unlimited episode "For the Man Who Has Everything".
- Krypto appears in Krypto the Superdog, voiced by Sam Vincent. Similarly to the comics, this version was sent off in a rocket as a puppy before Krypton exploded, though he accidentally damaged the rocket while playing with a ball, putting him in stasis and causing him to arrive on Earth long after Kal-El had become Superman. Now fully-grown, Krypto acquires superpowers similar to Superman's and is adopted by a young boy named Kevin Whitney with Superman's consent. Additionally, he can communicate with other animals and Kevin via an ear-implanted translator, and later joins the Dog Star Patrol.
- A dog based on Krypto appears in a self-titled episode of Smallville. This version acquired temporary super-strength through Kryptonite-related experiments conducted by LuthorCorp. After being found by Lois Lane and taken to the Kent family's farm, Clark Kent considers naming the dog Krypto because of his cryptic origins, but eventually names the dog Shelby after one of Martha Kent's old dogs.
- An unnamed dog resembling Krypto appears in the Legion of Super Heroes episode "Message in a Bottle". This version is a native of the shrunken city of Kandor.
- Krypto appears in the Batman: The Brave and the Bold episode "Battle of the Superheroes!".
- Krypto appears in the "DC Super-Pets!" segment of DC Nation Shorts, voiced by David Kaye.
- Krypto appears in Justice League Action.
- Krypto appears in Teen Titans Go!, voiced by Fred Tatasciore. Additionally, the Krypto the Superdog incarnation of the character appears in the episode "The Academy" via archival footage.
- Krypto appears in Titans, portrayed by dog actors Wrigley, Digby, and Lacey. This version is a Golden Retriever and test subject of Cadmus Laboratories who is initially kept in a Kryptonite cage before being rescued by Superboy and joins the Titans. After the Titans disband, Krypto accompanies Superboy in meeting Superman.
- Krypto appears in the DC Super Hero Girls (2019) episode "#BeastsInShow", with vocal effects provided by Dee Bradley Baker. This version is Kara Danvers's pet.
- Krypto appears in the fourth season of Superman & Lois. This version is a normal golden retriever that Clark Kent adopts shortly after Lois Lane's death in the future. Additionally, a cat named Otpyrk makes minor appearances in the second season as an inhabitant of the Inverse World.
- Krypto appears in the Harley Quinn episode "The Big Apricot".
- Krypto appears in My Adventures with Superman. This version is a normal dog who was trapped on a burning boat during the Yacht Adoption event in Metropolis. He was rescued along with the other dogs and people at the event by Superman and subsequently adopted by Lois Lane at the end of the third season.
- In June 2026, it was announced that Krypto will be the main character of an upcoming animated series currently in development.

=== Film ===
Krypto as he appears in Superman/Batman: Apocalypse

- Krypto appears in Superman/Batman: Apocalypse.
- Krypto appears in Lego DC Comics Super Heroes: The Flash.
- Krypto makes a cameo appearance in Teen Titans Go! To the Movies.
- Krypto appears in DC League of Super-Pets, voiced by Dwayne Johnson. This version accompanies Kal-El in his escape pod from Krypton's destruction and continues to be his faithful companion on Earth, and is a founding member of the titular League of Super-Pets with the Earth alias of "Bark Kent".
- Krypto appears in Batman and Superman: Battle of the Super Sons.
- Krypto appears in Scooby-Doo! and Krypto, Too!
- Krypto appears in films set in the DC Universe (DCU) as a CGI character. This version is Supergirl's pet and is also cared for by Superman. After Krypton's destruction, he was among the Kryptonian survivors of Argo City and encountered Kara after Alura's death. After the city was poisoned by Kryptonite, Krypto and Kara were sent to Earth by Zor-El to meet Superman.
  - Krypto appears in Superman (2025).While guarding the Fortress of Solitude, Krypto is captured by Lex Luthor and the Engineer, who infiltrated the Fortress. After escaping Luthor's pocket dimension, Krypto and Superman are taken to Smallville by Lois Lane, using Mister Terrific's T-Craft, so that Superman can recover from kryptonite poisoning. During the battle, he helps defeat Luthor's henchmen — Ultraman and the Raptors — to save Metropolis, before being picked up by Supergirl.
  - Krypto appears in the non-canon shorts Krypto Saves the Day! (2025–2026).
  - Krypto appears in Supergirl (2026).He accompanies Supergirl to many planets to celebrate, eventually encountering Ruthye Marye Knoll, before being poisoned by the Brigand leader Krem of the Yellow Hills. Following Krem's defeat, Krypto is saved in time by Supergirl after receiving the antidote, and they reunite with Superman on Earth, reaffirming that this is now their home.

=== Video games ===
- Krypto appears in DC Universe Online.
- Krypto appears as a character summon in Scribblenauts Unmasked: A DC Comics Adventure.
- Krypto appears as an unlockable playable character in Lego Batman 3: Beyond Gotham.
- Krypto appears as a purchasable playable character in Infinite Crisis, voiced by Frederick Posenor.
- Krypto was originally set to appear as a playable character in Injustice 2, but was cut from the game for unknown reasons.
- Krypto appears as an unlockable playable character in Lego DC Super-Villains.
- Krypto appears in DC League of Super Pets: The Adventures of Krypto and Ace.

=== Miscellaneous ===
- Krypto appears in Superman Adventures #14.
- Krypto appears in a limited series based on Krypto the Superdog.
- Krypto appears in DC Super Friends #14.
- Krypto appears in Capstone Publishers' DC Super-Pets book Pooches of Power, written by Sarah Stephens and drawn by Art Baltazar.
- A vision of Krypto appears in the Injustice: Gods Among Us prequel comic.
- Krypto appears in DC Super Hero Girls (2015).

== See also ==
- List of fictional dogs
