= List of fictional cars =

This list of fictional cars contains either cars that are the subject of a notable work of fiction, or else cars that are important elements of a work of fiction. For the purpose of this list, a car is a self-propelled artificial vehicle that runs in contact with the ground and that can be steered. This would include passenger cars, trucks and buses. This list includes vehicles that the characters of the story would regard as being the products of technological development, as opposed to supernatural or magical forces.

Cars in fiction may closely resemble real-life counterparts with only minor or unintentional deviations from a real-life namesake; such vehicles may still play an important role in a story. Or, the limitations of real cars may be completely ignored for story purposes; in extreme cases, describing the car is the main point of the story.

== Literature ==
- Chitty Chitty Bang Bang - the sometimes-flying car, star of the book/film/musical of the same name
- Christine - a 1958 Plymouth Fury from Stephen King's novel of the same name
- Flying Ford Anglia - a magical 1960 Ford Anglia 105E in the Harry Potter books and films.
- Gumdrop - an Austin Clifton "Heavy" 12/4, the eponymous star of a series of children's books by Val Biro
- The Haunted Car
- The Hirondel - a car that was used often by Simon Templar, otherwise known as the Saint
- Melmoth - a car driven by Humbert Humbert in Vladimir Nabokov's Lolita
- Mrs. Merdle - a series of Daimler cars owned by Lord Peter Wimsey, named for the character in Little Dorrit "because of her aversion to 'row'"
- Dick Turpin - a car in Good Omens, named for the highwayman Dick Turpin because he "holds up traffic"

== Film ==
Cars in animated films do not belong in this section.

- Truckster - National Lampoon's Vacation (1983)
- Cyclops - The Big Bus (1976)
- Bluesmobile - The Blues Brothers (1980)
- Landmaster - Damnation Alley (1977)
- EM-50 Urban Assault Vehicle - Stripes, (1981)
- Hannibal Twin-8 (built by fictional Prof. Fate) - The Great Race (1965)
- Leslie Special (built by fictional Webber Motor Company) - The Great Race (1965)
- Light Cycle - Tron (1982)
- Pursuit Special - Mad Max (1979)
- The Hearse
- Herbie - The Love Bug (1968)
- DeLorean time machine - Back to the Future (1985)
- DeLorean time machine Flight Police car - Back to the Future 2 (1989)
- The Gnome-Mobile
- "Eleanor" - Gone in 60 Seconds (1974)
- The Betsy 1978, based on a book by Harold Robbins
- Cars in Death Race 2000 (1975) include The Bull, The Buzzbomb, The Lion, The Alligator and The Turbo
- Cars in Death Race
- Cars in The Fast and Furious
- The Black Beauty - The Green Hornet
- Ecto-1 - Ghostbusters (1984)
- The Mirthmobile - Wayne's World (1992)
- 2015 Tartan Prancer - Vacation
- The Flying Wombat - The Young in Heart
- Alta Pazolli - Love Potion No. 9 (1992)
- Nick Fury's Enhanced Chevrolet Tahoe - Captain America: The Winter Soldier (2014)
- 2019 Spinner - self-contained lift, Blade Runner 1982 design by Syd Mead

== Television and radio ==
- Baby - a 1967 Chevrolet Impala - Supernatural
- Batmobile
- Battle Shell - Teenage Mutant Ninja Turtles
- Bessie - the Third Doctor's yellow roadster in Doctor Who
- Brum
- Cowabunga Carl Party Van - TMNT
- Foot pedaled cars in The Flintstones
- DRAG-U-LA - Grandpa Munster
- FAB1 - Lady Penelope's Rolls-Royce from Thunderbirds
- Fiat Cinquecento "Hawaii" - Simon Cooper's oft-ridiculed car from The Inbetweeners
- General Lee - The Dukes of Hazzard
- Hruck Bubgear - The Middleman
- KITT and KARR, its evil twin - Knight Rider
- KITT - Knight Rider 2008
- Munster Koach - The Munsters
- Maximum Security Vehicle - Captain Scarlet and the Mysterons
- Orbit - from the fictional car company Associated British Motors in On The Line
- Spectrum Saloon Car (SSC) - Captain Scarlet and the Mysterons
- Spectrum Pursuit Vehicle - Captain Scarlet and the Mysterons
- Mannix's automobiles
- The PO-01 Pointer - Ultraseven, car type: a Second Gen. Imperial
- Party Wagon - Teenage Mutant Ninja Turtles
- Rhino - New Captain Scarlet
- Shellraiser - Teenage Mutant Ninja Turtles
- Turtle Hauler - TMNT: Back to the Sewer
- Turtle Taxi - Teenage Mutant Ninja Turtles
- Turtle Van - Teenage Mutant Ninja Turtles and Teenage Mutant Ninja Turtles Adventures
- Viper
- The Man from U.N.C.L.E. car: custom plastic body "cyolac"

== Graphic novels, comics, animation and cartoons ==
- Batcycle - Several vehicles in Batman (also in TV and film)
- Batmobile - The primary transportation of the DC Comics superhero Batman. Note: The Batmobile has taken on many different forms from the 1930s to today and has evolved along with the character in TV, films, and comics.
- Vaillante - A car marque founded and developed as an eponymous, successful racing team by the family of the French comic book hero, racing driver Michel Vaillant. Its production includes a great number of both racing cars across all categories and prestige coupe and saloon sports cars. Vaillante is likely the most famous car manufacturer in fiction, by which many youngsters in real life were inspired to become racing drivers, car designers or engineers. Films were later made about Vaillante, die-cast and resin miniatures of the paper models were produced and real cars were built bearing its name, by way of hommage. The saga of the Vaillant family began to be chronicled in the 1950s, but the story of the company starts in 1939. In 2016, the Vaillant Group was merged with another fictional company, Leader, its arch-nemesis in Michel Vaillant’s adventures, and ceased to exist as both were absorbed by the fictional automotive group, Slate (which, incidentally, bears no relation to Slate Auto). Vaillante was later resurrected by a Vaillant heir, following revelations that the merger and acquisition was fraught with irregularities.
- Turbotraction - Another famous fictional car marque, which appeared in the Franco-Belgian comic strip, Spirou & Fantasio. Its flagship blue, turbine-engined Turbo Rhino was often a key accessory in the stories and was later replicated in real life by Franco Sbarro.
- Benny the Cab - Who Framed Roger Rabbit
- Lightning McQueen and multiple other characters - Cars
- The Mystery Machine - Scooby-Doo
- Arrowcar - Green Arrow's vehicle
- Mach Five - Speed Racer
- Spider-Mobile - vehicle briefly used by Spider-Man
- Susie - from the Disney animated short film Susie the Little Blue Coupe
- The Testarosetta - Sally Forth
- Thunder Machine
- Gadgetmobile - Inspector Gadget
- Jokermobile - Joker's vehicle
- Larrymobile - Larryboy's vehicle (debuted in VeggieTales in 1997)
- La Torpille - A home-built torpedo with a motorcycle engine belonging to a youth gang, Les 4 As.
- La Busarde - A car with tunnelling capabilities that belongs to the comic book pirate, La Buse, a friend of the Barneidor family, whose adventures were published in the 1970s in the French bi-monthly magazine for pre-teens and young teens, Okapi.
- The Adventures of Tintin by Hergé include a great number of real car models, as well as fictional models. Early adventures show cars and trucks that seem inspired by real-life models. The Calculus Affair also features several cars whose front grilles and bumpers are inspired by the moustache of the Bordurian dictator, Kurvi-Tasch.

== Games ==
- A-51 II APC, Armored Personnel Carrier armed with full-auto variant of the 48 Dredge GPMG ( x4 ) in Call of Duty: Black Ops III
- Driver: Parallel Lines
- Numerous car brands from the Grand Theft Auto series.
- M-102 Fast Reconnaissance Vehicle, also known as the FRV are off-road vehicles from the Helldivers series sporting a mounted machine gun and seating for all four members of a standard Helldiver squad plus one.
- M12 Force Application Vehicle series, commonly known as the Warthog are a series of jeep-like vehicles in the Halo (series). They can be configured with a .50 Caliber anti-aircraft turret, anti material rocket pods, a troop carrier or a Gauss cannon
- Putt-Putt, a car from the game series by Humongous Entertainment
- Red Bull X2010
- Uncle Jalapeño's car from LittleBigPlanet
- Vision Gran Turismo, a series of cars designed by leading manufacturers for use in the Gran Turismo series
- The Marek and RWD Le Mans prototypes and SMS formula racing cars in the Project CARS series
- Falcogini, a luxury car brand from Payday 2
- Quartz Regalia 723, a luxury sedan from Final Fantasy XV
- Chryslus, a pre-war company that produced nuclear powered vehicles, such as the Atomic V-8, in the Fallout series

== Music ==
- Ford Timelord, musician, 1968 Ford Galaxie, WGU 18G.

== See also ==
- List of fictional vehicles
- Vaillante, a fictional automobile manufacturer
- Grand Theft Auto video game
