= On the Line =

On the Line may refer to:

== Film and television ==
- On the Line (1971 film), a film featuring Shane Stanley
- On the Line (1982 TV drama), featuring the fictional Associated British Motors company
- On the Line (1984 film), a film starring David Carradine
- On the Line (1998 film), an American TV movie starring Linda Hamilton
- On the Line (2001 film), an American romantic comedy directed by Eric Bross
- On the Line (2007 film), a Swiss German short film
- On the Line (2011 film), a Canadian documentary by Frank Wolf
- On the Line (2021 film), a South Korean crime action film
- On the Line (2022 film), an American film starring Mel Gibson
- On the Line, a UK sport show presented by Sally Jones

== Music ==
=== Albums ===
- On the Line (Gary U.S. Bonds album), 1982
- On the Line (Jenny Lewis album) or the title song, 2019
- On the Line (Michael Wycoff album) or the title song, 1983
- On the Line (soundtrack) or the title song, from the 2001 film

=== Songs ===
- "On the Line" (Michael Jackson song), 1997
- "On the Line" (San Cisco song), 2020
- "On the Line", by Demi Lovato from Don't Forget, 2008
- "On the Line", by Julian Perretta, 2018
- "On the Line", by Peter Cetera from Peter Cetera, 1981

== Literature ==
- On the Line, a 2010 novel by S. J. Rozan
- On the Line, a 1957 short-story collection by Harvey Swados
- "On The Line", a storyline in the science fiction comedy webtoon series Live with Yourself!

== Other uses ==
- On the Line (horse), a Thoroughbred race horse, winner of the 1988 San Fernando Stakes
