= List of Super Powers minicomics =

With each Super Powers Collection action figure of the first two series, a minicomic was included. Below is a list of them.

== Series 1 ==
1. Superman: Lex Luthor attacks a nuclear facility and Superman must stop him. Toy-made characters: Lex Luthor, Superman.
2. Batman: The Joker transforms a lot of people into Jokers. Toy-made characters: Batman, Robin, Joker, Wonder Woman.
3. Wonder Woman: Brainiac seizes control of Superman's mind and sends him on a destructive rampage. In Washington D.C., Wonder Woman confronts Superman and uses her magic lasso to defeat him. Toy-made characters: Wonder Woman, Superman, Brainiac.
4. The Flash: The Flash must save the Justice League from Brainiac. Toy-made characters: Brainiac, Superman, Hawkman, Wonder Woman, Batman, Flash.
5. Brainiac: Superman and Batman must stop the chaos Brainiac is creating. Toy-made characters: Batman, Superman, Brainiac.
6. Penguin: The Penguin steals some jewels from rich people, including Bruce Wayne and Carter Hall, Batman and Hawkman's alter egos. Toy-made characters: Batman, Hawkman, Penguin.
7. The Joker: The Joker robs a bank and his Jokermobile is pursued by Batman's Batmobile. Toy-made characters: Joker, Batman, Aquaman.
8. Aquaman: Aquaman and the Flash team up to stop the Penguin. Toy-made characters: Penguin, Flash, Aquaman.
9. Robin: Robin intercepts the Penguin stealing an experimental space vehicle, the Moonbird. Caught by Penguin, Robin calls for Green Lantern and Hakwman to assist him in stopping Penguin. Toy-made characters: Robin, Green Lantern, Hawkman, Penguin.
10. Lex Luthor: Luthor kidnaps the President. Toy-made characters: Wonder Woman, Lex Luthor, Superman, Aquaman.
11. Green Lantern: The Joker is kidnapping a "Royal Flush" of hostages. Green Lantern discovers Robin has beaten him to locating the Joker's HQ. Together they defeat him and free the hostages. Toy-made characters: Green Lantern, Robin, Joker.
12. Hawkman: Hawkman tries to stop some birds controlled by Lex Luthor from stealing the Midway City museum. Flash and Green Lantern help Hawkman and discover the birds are robots. Toy-made characters: Hawkman, Lex Luthor, Green Lantern, Flash.

== Series 2 ==
1. Steppenwolf.
2. Martian Manhunter: Martian Manhunter stops DeSaad's attack on the United Nations. Toy-made characters: Martian Manhunter, Wonder Woman, DeSaad, Firestorm.
3. Doctor Fate: Doctor Fate is forced to fight Superman and Martian Manhunter, who have fallen under the control of Darkseid. Toy-made characters: Doctor Fate, Superman, Martian Manhunter, Darkseid.
4. Firestorm: Firestorm stops Mantis (with Superman's powers) from turning New York into another Apokolips. Toy-made characters: Firestorm, Green Arrow, Mantis, and Superman.
5. Mantis.
6. Green Arrow: Kalibak tries to steal a Martian jewel from the Star City Museum. Toy-made characters: Green Arrow, Martian Manhunter, Flash, Kalibak.
7. Darkseid: Batman and Firestorm stop Darkseid from kidnapping Red Tornado. Toy-made characters: Batman, Firestorm, Red Tornado, Darkseid, Parademons.
8. Kalibak: Darkseid sends Kalibak to attack Doctor Fate, who summons Superman and Red Tornado to help. Toy-made characters: Darkseid, Doctor Fate, Kalibak, Red Tornado.
9. DeSaad: Toy-made characters: Darkseid, DeSaad, Doctor Fate, Robin, Green Arrow.
10. Parademon: Toy-made characters: Darkseid, Parademons, Green Lantern, Doctor Fate, Firestorm.
11. Red Tornado: Hawkman, Red Tornado, Green Arrow, Parademons.

== Series 3 ==
Estrela exclusive:

1. Shazam minicomic: Captain Marvel faces Doctor Sivana and his family. Toy-made character: Shazam.
2. Cyborg minicomic: Cyborg and the Teen Titans battle Brainiac. Toy-made characters: Cyborg, Brainiac, Robin.
3. Plastic Man (Homem Borracha) minicomic: Plastic Man, Woozy Winks, and Chief Branner must stop Cheeseface and Edam O'Grottin (reprint of "The Milk of Human Cruelty" from Adventure Comics #476). Toy-made character: Plastic Man.
