= Billy Batson and the Magic of Shazam! =

American superhero comic book series

Publication information
- Publisher: DC Comics
- Schedule: Monthly
- Format: Ongoing series
- Genre: Superhero
- Publication date: September 2008 – October 2010
- No. of issues: 21

Creative team
- Created by: Mike Kunkel
- Written by: Mike Kunkel; Art Baltazar; Franco Aureliani
- Artist(s): Mike Kunkel; Byron Vaughns; Stephen DeStefano; Mike Norton; Bob Renzas
- Letterer(s): Steve Wands; Travis Lanha
- Colorist(s): Mike Kunkel; Zac Atkinson
- Editor(s): Stephanie Buscema; Jann Jones; Adam Schlagman

Billy Batson and the Magic of Shazam! is an all-ages comic book series published by DC Comics as a part of its Johnny DC imprint. The series debuted in September 2008, and was originally written and drawn by Mike Kunkel.

== Overview ==
In Magic of Shazam!, Billy Batson is a young boy who must juggle his superheroic life as Captain Marvel with looking after his rambunctious little sister Mary Marvel. Unlike Billy, who transforms into an adult when he speaks the magic word "Shazam", Mary possesses only a fraction of his power, although she is faster, and remains a child in her superhero form. Tawky Tawny, a shapeshifting servant of the wizard Shazam, assists them and comes to live with them at their insistence. Other Marvel Family characters are similarly re-imagined, such as Black Adam who is presented as bratty exchange student Theo Adam, a classmate of Billy. In their clashes, a boy, Freddy Freeman, is accidentally seriously injured and paralyzed, blaming the Marvels for his condition. Black Adam exploits this hate to recruit Freddy with his power as Black Adam Jr. until the boy realizes the villain's evil and reconciled with the Marvels, which led to Captain Marvel bestowing him a portion of his power to become Captain Marvel Jr.

== Collected editions ==
- Billy Batson and the Magic of Shazam! (collects #1–6)
- Billy Batson and the Magic of Shazam!: Mr. Mind Over Matter (collects #7–12)
