= Super Jrs. =

Alternate versions of DC Comics superheroes

Super Juniors are a group of fictional DC Comics characters based on members of the Justice League of America, designed as baby versions to appeal to younger audiences and introduce them to the publisher's most popular properties. At Kenner's request, first appeared in José Luis García-López's 1982 DC Comics Style Guide and had their first and only adventure in Super Jrs. Holiday Special: The Best of DC Blue Ribbon Digest #58 (March 1985) in a story written by Tom DeFalco and drawn by Vince Squeglia.

Characters include "Jr." versions of Superman (Super-Kid, Casey), Batman (Bat-Guy, Carlos) and Robin (Kid-Robin, the Shrimp), Wonder Woman (Wonder Tot, Deedee), Flash (Flash-Kid, Rembrandt), Green Arrow, Green Lantern, Hawkman, Aquaman, and Supergirl.

== De-aging storylines ==
Various unrelated stories set in the main DC Comics continuity have focused on the heroes' younger selves or had them transformed into children.

In Wonder Woman #105 (1959), Wonder Tot was introduced as Wonder Woman during her younger years. Through magic, the child was able to co-exist alongside her older self without any ramifications. Befriending Mister Genie (Genro), she would return infrequently over the years that followed in her own adventures.

In Action Comics #260 (1960), Supergirl is reduced in age when she comes into contact with a pool of water upon saving an old man.

In several instances, Superman has been reduced to a youthful version of himself. In Action Comics #284 (1962), he purposely exposes himself to red kryptonite to transform himself into a child and enter a small gap into the Phantom Zone. In the Super Friends: The Legendary Super Powers Show episode "Uncle Mxyzptlk" (1984), Superman is again exposed to red kryptonite and is de-aged, referred by his teammates as "Super Brat". Beginning in Superboy #8 (1950), the adventures of Superman during his youngest years were infrequently depicted with the hero identified as Superbaby. The DC Nation Shorts segment Tokyo/Baby Superman features a baby who gains Superman's powers.

In Batman #147 (1962), a scientist transforms Batman's body into that of a four-year-old. In the Batman: The Brave and the Bold episode "The Malicious Mr. Mind!" (2011), Doctor Sivana uses a ray on Batman that sees him regress in age. In Mad #8 (1953), Batman is parodied as a little person named Bat Boy with sidekick Rubin (in place of Robin). This story would later be adapted for the Batman: The Brave and the Bold episode "Bat-Mite Presents: Batman's Strangest Cases!" (2011). For DC Nation Shorts, Aardman Animations produced Batman shorts featuring a juvenile Batman and a likewise treatment of his cast of characters.

During the events of Young Justice: Sins of Youth (2000), the Justice League, Justice Society of America, and several other adults are transformed into children by Klarion the Witch Boy, who also transforms the members of Young Justice into adults.

In the Superman/Batman arc "Lil' Leaguers", a juvenile Justice League from a parallel world is introduced including Superman, Batman, Wonder Woman, Green Lantern, Flash, Red Arrow, Red Tornado, Supergirl, Vixen, Black Lightning, Zatanna, and Black Canary. Lil' villains from their world also appear in Lex Luthor, Joker, Doomsday, Catwoman, Two-Face, Cyborg Superman, Brainiac, Bizarro, Poison Ivy, Hush, Clayface, Killer Croc, and Mr. Freeze. 2012's "The Curse of Superman" in Action Comics #9 formally introduced Earth 42, home to the Little League featuring juvenile versions of Aquaman, Batman, Cyborg, Green Arrow, Hawkman, Martian Manhunter, Steel, Superman, and Wonder Woman. The series Batman: Li'l Gotham was based on this Earth.

In Adventure Comics #338 (November 1965), the Time Trapper transformed several members of the Legion of Super-Heroes into youthful versions of themselves. These members included Saturn Girl, Chameleon Boy, Element Lad, Invisible Kid, Light Lass, Matter-Eater Lad, Star Boy, and Ultra Boy. Earlier in the series, various Legion members had been similarly reduced temporarily to babyhood in Adventure #317 ("The Menace of Dream Girl") and later, in #356 the concept was re-introduced with "Superbaby, Element Infant, Dream Tot, Little Mon-El and Baby Braniac" cover-featured in the story "The Five Legion Orphans".

== See also ==
- Super Powers Collection
- JL8
- Tiny Titans
- X-Babies
