= Batman Total Justice =

Toy line produced by Kenner

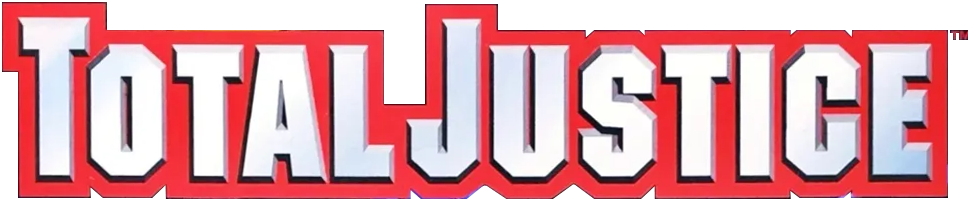
- Type: Action figures
- Invented by: DC Comics
- Company: Kenner
- Country: United States
- Availability: 1996–97
- Materials: Plastic
- Features: DC Universe

Batman Total Justice, or simply Total Justice, is a line of action figures produced by Kenner based on Batman and other, connected, DC Comics characters.

== History ==
In 1996, Kenner started production on a new line of 5" scale DC Comics character figures. This line, like Legends of Batman and Legends of the Dark Knight, featured all new sculpts of popular DC Comics characters. To appeal to buyers, Kenner produced the line under the high selling Batman title, calling the line Batman: Total Justice. This line featured Batman, Robin, and Huntress, but also included other DC Comics characters including Superman, Green Lantern, The Flash, and others.

This was the first line of DC Comics character figures released by Kenner since the Super Powers Collection line of figures ended 10 years earlier. Kenner stopped production after only 18 figures were released: 14 regular figures, one chase variant, and three exclusives. A fourth series of figures was planned to include Blue Beetle, Doctor Polaris, Fractal Armor Green Lantern, and Fractal Armor Flash.

== Storyline from the packages ==
=== Total Justice ===
On Apokolips, Darkseid prepares for his invasion and destruction of Earth. Batman learns of this plan and recruits the world's mightiest superheroes in an all-out assault on Darkseid's forces.

=== DC Super Heroes ===
In his mountain fortress, Despero plans his conquest of Earth. Batman creates light-refracting armor to help the heroes avoid Despero's high-tech security devices.

== Other media ==
In 1996, DC Comics produced a three-issue tie-in mini-series featuring the heroes from the first series (Batman, Robin, Aquaman, Flash and Green Lantern) plus Blue Beetle, Gypsy, Darkseid, and a Parademon.

In 1997, Landoll's released a series of seven Coloring & Activity books featuring an ongoing story and character designs for unreleased toy characters, as well as two children's books, And Justice for All and Justice on Apokolips, that followed the same basic story of Darkseid, with Despero's help, trying to find the pieces of an "Ultimate Weapon" that had been scattered around Earth.

In 1998, Kid Rhino released the Total Justice: The Ultimate Weapon "audio adventure" on CD and cassette.

== Toys ==
=== Total Justice ===
==== Series 1 ====
- Aquaman (with "gold armor" variant)
- Batman
- Darkseid
- Flash (Wally West)
- Green Lantern (Kyle Rayner)
- Robin (Tim Drake)

==== Series 2 ====
- Despero
- Fractal Armor Batman
- Hawkman (Hawk-God version)
- Superman (w/ long hair)

==== Series 3 ====
- Black Lightning
- Green Arrow (Connor Hawke)
- Huntress (Helena Bertinelli)
- Parallax (Hal Jordan)

==== Exclusives ====
===== Mailaways =====
- Batman
- Superman

===== ToyFare Magazine =====
- Reverse-Flash (Eobard Thawne)

=== DC Super-Heroes ===
Looking to reuse the steel tooling used to make the toys, the Hasbro toy company (owners of Kenner) repainted six of the Total Justice figures and released them exclusively at the Warner Bros. Studio Store in 1998. They later released a mix of unused Total Justice molds and new sculpts in a series of two-packs at mass retail.

==== Exclusives ====
- Aquaman
- Batman
- Despero
- Green Arrow
- Hawkman
- Robin

==== Multipacks ====
- Blue Beetle (Ted Kord), Fractal Armor The Flash w/ the Atom (Ray Palmer)
- Fractal Armor Green Lantern vs. Doctor Polaris
- Superman vs. Metallo
- Superboy vs. King Shark

=== JLA ===
In 1998, Hasbro produced the same figures included in the Total Justice line, but this time released them as a shared exclusive between KB Toys and Diamond Comic Distributors under the name JLA (a tie-in with the popular comic title). Several of the unproduced Total Justice figures were released under the JLA name, but no new Batman-related characters were included. Each figure in the JLA line included a stand with the JLA logo and a mini comic cover. Starting with Series 3, the line started to include characters from the Young Justice comic book.

==== Series 1 ====
- Batman
- Green Lantern
- Green Arrow (in darker green)
- Huntress
- The Flash (in darker red and gold)
- Superman Blue
- Superman Red

==== Series 2 ====
- Aquaman
- Dark Knight Batman
- Martian Manhunter
- Steel
- Superman (w/ short hair)
- Zauriel

==== Series 3 ====
- Caped Crusader Batman
- Impulse
- Plastic Man
- Robin (with comic-accurate yellow underside cape)
- Superboy

==== Series 4 ====
- Atom (Ray Palmer)
- Batman
- Cyber Armor Batman
- Cyber Armor Superman
- Red Tornado
- Wonder Woman

==== Diamond Exclusive Box Sets ====
- Box Set #1: Superman Blue, Green Lantern, Huntress, Hologram Batman, Hologram Flash
- Box Set #2: Batman, The Flash, Green Arrow, Hologram Superman, Hologram Green Lantern
- Box Set #3: Martian Manhunter, Superman, Zauriel, Lex Luthor, Joker
- Box Set #4: Superboy, Robin, Impulse, Hologram Martian Manhunter, Hologram Aquaman

=== Unmade characters ===
Some characters appeared in Landoll's Total Justice coloring books with Fractaltech armor, but they were never made in the toyline:

- Martian Manhunter
- Oracle
- Steel (John Henry Irons)
- Superboy (Kon-El)
- Supergirl (Matrix)
- Wonder Woman

All of those characters received figures once the line was rebranded into JLA except Supergirl and Oracle.
