= Bob Bolling =

American cartoonist

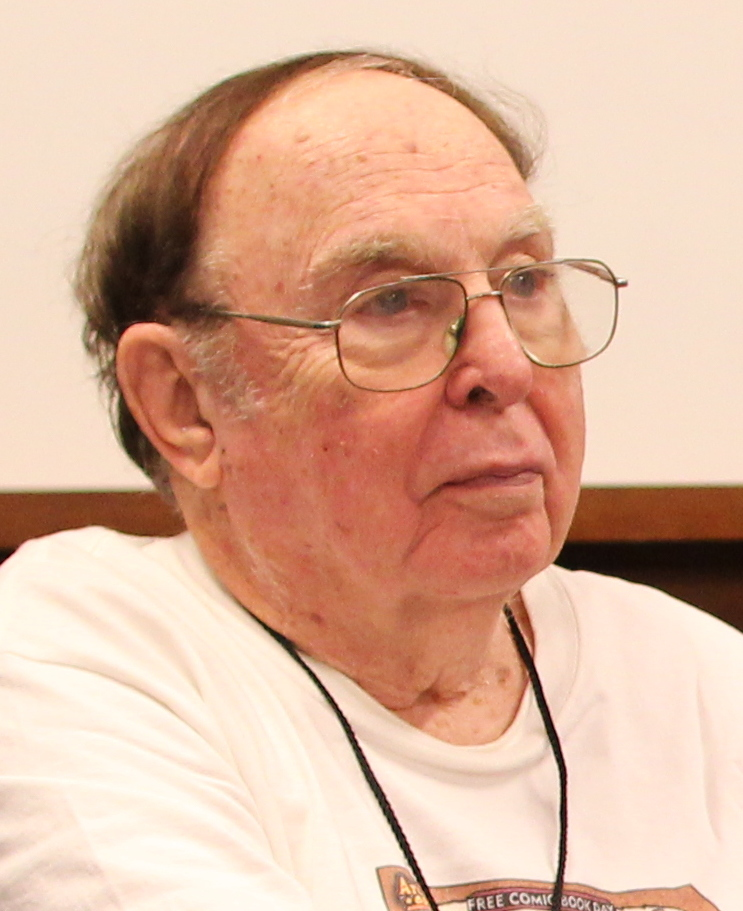
- Bolling at the Florida Supercon in 2012
- Born: June 9, 1928 (age 98) Brockton, Massachusetts, U.S.
- Areas: Cartoonist, Writer, Penciller, Inker, Letterer
- Notable works: Archie Comics; Little Archie; Wally the Wizard

Bob Bolling (born June 9, 1928) is an American cartoonist best known for his work in Archie Comics. He created the company's popular spin-off title Little Archie.

== Biography ==
Bolling was born in Brockton, Massachusetts. After serving in the U.S. Navy, he graduated from Vesper George Art School in Boston. His first job in comics was assisting cartoonist George Shedd on the adventure comic strip Marlin Keel. In 1954 he began freelancing for Archie Comics, writing and drawing joke pages. Deciding that Bolling was better at drawing children than adults or teenagers, Archie editor Harry Shorten assigned him to work on Pat the Brat, a comic about a child with an obvious resemblance to Dennis the Menace.

In 1956, Archie publisher John Goldwater decided to do a comic about the adventures of Archie as a little boy. Shorten asked Bolling to create designs for Archie and his friends as small children. When the designs were approved by Goldwater and Shorten, Bolling was assigned to write and draw the first issue of Little Archie. After the debut issue was a success, Bolling was assigned full-time to Little Archie, and was permitted to sign his stories starting with the second issue.

From 1957 to 1965, Bolling worked exclusively on Little Archie, writing, drawing, inking and lettering approximately half the stories in each giant-sized quarterly issue. (Most of the other stories were written and drawn by Dexter Taylor, Bolling's former roommate.) Bolling also drew the covers for most issues. Bolling created a number of characters who had no counterparts in the "big" Archie universe at the time, including Little Archie's dog Spotty, Betty's cat Caramel, Little Archie's "picked-on pal" Ambrose Pipps, Betty's siblings Chic and Polly Cooper, and the South Side Serpents, a gang of tough kids who frequently went to war against Little Archie's "Good Ol' Gang." In issue # 24, he created his most popular recurring villain, Mad Doctor Doom, a green-skinned mad scientist trying to take over the world with the help of his dimwitted assistant Chester. The character made his debut at "approximately the same time" as Marvel Comics' Victor Von Doom.

Bolling also did several Little Archie spinoffs, including Little Archie in Animal Land, a four-issue series that mixed humor with educational stories about animals and the natural world, a one-shot comic starring Ambrose, and two issues of Little Archie Mystery Comics.

Bolling's Little Archie stories were usually longer than the typical Archie story, and incorporated a much wider range of material and approaches, ranging from light comedy to adventure to science fiction (Little Archie is taken to Mars in issue # 18) to tearjerking sentimentality. He would also change the designs of the characters depending on the nature of the story: in his adventure stories, the adults are usually drawn in a realistic style to contrast with the cartoony style of Little Archie and his friends. His stories are also notable for their lush backgrounds and specific references to the geography of Riverdale. His own favorite story is "The Long Walk" from Little Archie # 20, where Betty's attempt to walk home with Little Archie is told with a mix of comedy and sentiment; one entire page is devoted to a giant map charting everything that happens on their walk home, and the story uses a fantasy framing device where Betty's toys come to life and discuss her situation.

In 1965, Bolling was relieved of his duties on Little Archie (Dexter Taylor took over the title full-time) and moved to the regular Archie comics. After getting tips from both Dan DeCarlo and Harry Lucey on how to draw the teenaged Archie characters, he spent the next decade and a half drawing stories for such titles as Archie's Pals and Gals, sometimes from his own scripts, but more often from scripts by Frank Doyle.

In 1979, Archie Comics began to give Bolling more work as a writer-artist, starting by returning him to Little Archie on a part-time basis. From 1983 to 1985 he both wrote and drew Archie and Me, injecting the title with drama and adventure as well as comedy, and bringing some Little Archie characters, including Spotty, into the "big" Archie universe. In between Archie assignments, Bolling created, wrote and drew issues #1, 3 & 9 of Marvel Comics' Wally the Wizard. Bolling is now officially retired.

Bolling's work on Little Archie has earned him comparisons to Carl Barks for the wide emotional and stylistic range of his work. Scott Shaw! has written that "Bolling's clever, sometimes surprisingly emotional writing, his imaginative storytelling and staging and his dramatic, Will Eisner-ish inking" make Little Archie "add up to a comic book series unlike any other ever published by Archie Comics." Jaime Hernandez has said that Bolling's influence "is the reason I write the way I write," adding that he is influenced by Bolling's controlled sentimentality – "he knows when to back off; he knows exactly what to put in and what to take out, and when" – and by his ability to convey moods and times of day in his stories: "As a kid, I could just feel myself outside when I was reading them – being by myself when the stillness of the afternoon is spookier than the dark of the night, you know? He would draw lone silhouettes off in the distance, and they seemed so lonely it made me want to cry. We've been trying to write stories like that ever since, trying to convey those feelings that he put into those stories."

== Awards ==
Bolling received the Inkpot Award in 2005 in recognition of his work on Little Archie. He was presented with the Bill Finger Award for Excellence in Comic Book Writing at San Diego Comic-Con in 2022. In 2026, Bolling was selected for inclusion in the Eisner Hall of Fame.
