= The Superman Family =

US comic book

- Cover of The Superman Family #164 (April–May 1974), the initial issue published under that title. Cover art by Nick Cardy.

Publication information
- Publisher: DC Comics
- Schedule: Bimonthly #164–207; Monthly #208–222
- Format: 100 pages (#164–169); 64 pages (#170–176, 191–204); 48 pages (#177–181, 205–222); 80 pages (#182–190)
- Publication date: The Superman Family: April/May 1974 – September 1982; Superman Family Adventures: July 2012 – June 2013
- No. of issues: The Superman Family: 59 (#164–222); Superman Family Adventures: 12
- Main character(s): Lois Lane; Supergirl; Jimmy Olsen; Krypto; Nightwing and Flamebird; Clark Kent; Superboy; Kal-L and Lois Lane Kent

Creative team
- Written by: List: The Superman Family: Cary Bates, E. Nelson Bridwell, Cary Burkett, Gerry Conway, Tom DeFalco, Leo Dorfman, Scott Edelman, Jack C. Harris, Paul Kupperberg, Paul Levitz, Elliot S. Maggin, Tamsyn O'Flynn, Martin Pasko, Bob Rozakis, Roy Thomas, Bob Toomey, Marv Wolfman Superman Family Adventures: Franco Aureliani, Art Baltazar
- Penciller: List: The Superman Family: Jack Abel, Bob Brown, John Calnan, John Celardo, José Delbo, Luis Dominguez, Arvell Jones, Ken Landgraf, Win Mortimer, Irv Novick, Bob Oksner, Juan Ortiz, Carl Potts, Marshall Rogers, John Rosenberger, Art Saaf, Alex Saviuk, Kurt Schaffenberger, Joe Staton, Chic Stone, Curt Swan, George Tuska, Alan Weiss Superman Family Adventures: Art Baltazar
- Inker: List: The Superman Family: Dan Adkins, Murphy Anderson, Tex Blaisdell, Brett Breeding, Frank Chiaramonte, Vince Colletta, Frank Giacoia, Joe Giella, Don Heck, Dave Hunt, Jimmy Janes, Frank McLaughlin, Al Milgrom, Steve Mitchell, Bob Oksner, Joe Orlando, Juan Ortiz, Marshall Rogers, John Rosenberger, Josef Rubinstein, Kurt Schaffenberger, Bob Smith, Joe Staton, Romeo Tanghal, Sal Trapani Superman Family Adventures: Art Baltazar
- Letterer: List: The Superman Family: Pierre Bernard, Janice Chiang, John Costanza, Albert DeGuzman, Phil Felix, Anette Kawecki, Todd Klein, Adam Kubert, Shelly Leferman, Bill Morse, Ben Oda, Clem Robins, Gaspar Saladino, Debra Schulman, Jean Simek, Milton Snapinn, Mike Stevens, Morris Waldinger, John Workman Superman Family Adventures: Art Baltazar
- Colorist: List: The Superman Family: Cory Adams, Liz Berube, Gene D'Angelo, John Drake, Bob LeRose, Phil Rachelson, Adrienne Roy, Bob Rozakis, Mario Sen, Jerry Serpe, Anthony Tollin, Tatjana Wood, Tom Ziuko Superman Family Adventures: Art Baltazar
- Editor: List: The Superman Family: Murray Boltinoff (#164, 166–167, 169–170, 172–173, 175–176, 178–179, 181) Julius Schwartz (#165, 168, 171, 174, 177, 180, 195–222) Dennis O'Neil (#182–184) E. Nelson Bridwell (#185–194) Superman Family Adventures: Kristy Quinn

The Superman Family is an American comic book series published by DC Comics from 1974 to 1982 featuring supporting characters in the Superman comics. The term "Superman Family" is often used to refer to the extended cast of characters of comics books associated with Superman. A similarly titled series, Superman Family Adventures, was published in 2012.

== Publication history ==
The Superman Family was an amalgamation of the titles Superman's Girl Friend, Lois Lane, Superman's Pal Jimmy Olsen, and Supergirl. The first issue, #164, took its numbering from Jimmy Olsen, which had reached issue #163 and thus had the most issues published. Lois Lane ended at #137, while the newly launched Supergirl book had only made it to #9 at the time. A 10th and final issue of Supergirl was published five months after The Superman Family's launch.

The Superman Family went through two distinct phases. In its inception the three leads Jimmy Olsen, Lois Lane, and Supergirl rotated new stories each issue with reprints for the other characters. The first six issues (#164–169) of the series were in the 100 Page Super Spectacular format and Nick Cardy was the cover artist. Changes were made in the setting of Supergirl's adventures during the character's run in the title. She moved to Florida to join the faculty at the New Athens Experimental School in issue #165. In an "imaginary story" set in a possible future in issue #200, Supergirl, now known as Superwoman, is depicted as being the Governor of Florida in her secret identity of Linda Danvers. She leaves Florida and relocates to New York City to become a soap opera actress in issue #208.

After the cancellation of Super-Team Family, a Supergirl/Doom Patrol team-up originally scheduled to appear in that title was published in The Superman Family #191–193. Supergirl battled the Enchantress in issues #204–205 and teamed with the Legion of Super-Heroes in issue #207.

The Superman Family became the first DC Comics series in the 80-page Dollar Comic format, consisting of 64 pages of new stories, beginning with issue #182 (March–April 1977). With that issue, the "framing element" was removed from the covers, and the book switched to printing all-new material. It became a monthly series in 1981, starting with issue #207.

== Featured series ==
- Lois Lane - the adventures of Lois Lane, where she regularly battled criminals (#166, 169, 172, 175, 178, 181–222).
- Supergirl - the adventures of Supergirl (#165, 168, 171, 174, 177, 180, 182–222).
- Jimmy Olsen - the adventures of Jimmy Olsen (#164, 167, 170, 173, 176, 179, 182–222).
- Superboy - the adventures of the Earth-One Superman as a teenage superhero. This series continued from Adventure Comics #458 and led to the feature leaving the title for its own in 1980, The New Adventures of Superboy (#182, 191–198).
- The Private Life of Clark Kent - the adventures of Clark Kent in which he used his powers and skills without becoming Superman. This feature had moved over from Superman after issue #328 of that series (#182, 191-197, 199-215). After the cancellation of The Superman Family, it returned to Superman for two more appearances in issues #371 and 373.
- Mr. and Mrs. Superman - the adventures of the Earth-Two Superman and his wife, Lois Lane Kent. This feature had also moved over from Superman after issue #329 (#195-196, 198-199, 201-222).
- Krypto - the adventures of Superman's dog with the aid of detective Ed Lacy (#182–192).
- Nightwing and Flamebird - the adventures of the second Nightwing and Flamebird team of heroes (Van-Zee and Ak-Var) in the bottle city of Kandor (#183–194).

DC published several other ... Family titles concurrently with The Superman Family. These included Batman Family (1975–78), Super-Team Family (1975–78) and Tarzan Family (1975–76). As a rule, DC's other ... Family titles contained mostly reprints and featured a higher page count and a higher price than DC's other titles.

With issue #222 (September 1982), The Superman Family was cancelled and replaced with The Daring New Adventures of Supergirl, which briefly featured a "Lois Lane" backup series.

== Superman Family Adventures ==
In 2012, DC launched a new series titled Superman Family Adventures written by Art Baltazar and Franco Aureliani and drawn by Baltazar. Baltazar and Aureliani were the winners of the 2011 Eisner Award in the category "Best Publication for Kids" for their work on the Tiny Titans title for DC. Fuzzy the Krypto Mouse, a character who appeared in a single story in Superboy #65 (June 1958), inspired a similar character created by Baltazar for Superman Family Adventures. Superman Family Adventures ended with issue #12.

== In other media ==
In the My Adventures with Superman TV series, the Superman Family are group of members and associated allies and is based on its own comic book series.

- Clark Kent / Superman: A Kryptonian superhero and a journalist for the Daily Planet in Metropolis.
- Lois Lane: A journalist of the Daily Planet, and Clark Kent / Superman's love interest.
- Jimmy Olsen: A photographer for the Daily Planet, and Clark Kent / Superman and Lois's best friend.
- Kara Zor-El / Supergirl: A Kryptonian superhero and Superman's cousin. (season 3; recurring season 2)
- Bizarro: A clone of Superman. (recurring season 3)
- Jonathan Lane / Jon Kent / Superboy: Lois and Clark's son from a future timeline. (recurring season 3)
- Lara Lane / Supergirl: Lois and Clark's daughter from a future timeline. (recurring season 3)
- Krypto: A dog who was adopted by Lois for Clark. (recurring season 3)

== Collected editions ==
- Showcase Presents: Batgirl Vol. 1 includes the Supergirl story from The Superman Family #171, 520 pages, July 2007, ISBN 978-1401213671
- Superman: The Amazing Transformations of Jimmy Olsen includes the Jimmy Olsen story from The Superman Family #173, 192 pages, July 2007, ISBN 1-4012-1369-3
- Superman: The Adventures of Nightwing and Flamebird collects the Jimmy Olsen story from The Superman Family #173 and the Nightwing and Flamebird stories from The Superman Family #183–194, 144 pages, October 2009, ISBN 140122525X
- Superman: The World of Krypton includes the World of Krypton story from The Superman Family #182, 240 pages, March 2008, ISBN 978-1401217952
- Deadman Book Three includes the Lois Lane story from The Superman Family #183, 176 pages, December 2012, ISBN 978-1401237288
- Superman: Bottle City of Kandor includes the Nightwing and Flamebird story from The Superman Family #194, 200 pages, October 2007, ISBN 978-1401214654
