= Franco Aureliani =

American comic book writer/artist

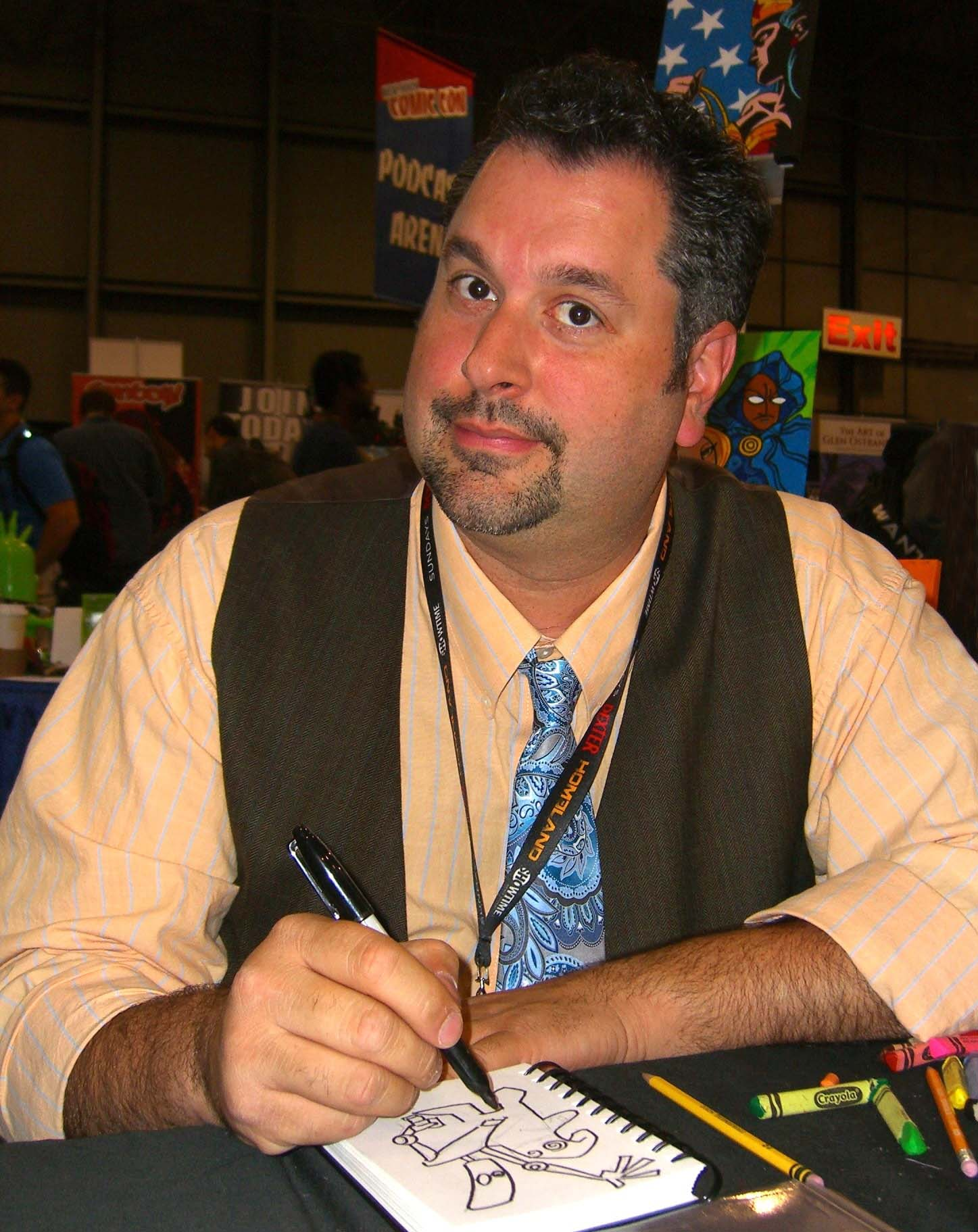
- Aureliani at the 2011 New York Comic Con
- Area: Writer
- Notable works: Tiny Titans; Itty Bitty Hellboy
- Awards: 2009, 2011, and 2014 Eisner Award for Best Publication for Kids; 2011 Harvey Award for Best Original Graphic Publication for Young Readers

Franco Aureliani is an American comic book writer/artist, best known for writing the DC Comics series Tiny Titans, for which he won two Eisner Awards in 2009 and 2011. Tiny Titans won a Harvey award in 2011. He was nominated for another Harvey in 2013 for another project from DC Comics, Superman Family Adventures. He and longtime writing partner and friend, Art Baltazar, won their third Eisner in 2014 for the Dark Horse Comics children's series Itty Bitty Hellboy. Aureliani teaches art at Carmel High School.

== Career ==
Franco Aureliani is the artist and co-writer with Art Baltazar of Tiny Titans, for which the two won the 2009 and 2011 Eisner Award for Best Publication for Kids. Baltazar and Franco co-wrote DC's Billy Batson and the Magic of Shazam! and the comic book adaptation of Young Justice. In 2012, DC launched a new series titled Superman Family Adventures which was written and drawn by Baltazar and Aureliani. In 2013, Baltazar and Aureliani launched a revival of The Green Team for DC. That series was canceled in January 2014.

Aureliani is an art teacher at Carmel High School in Carmel, New York.

== Awards ==
- 2009 Eisner Award for Best Publication for Kids for Tiny Titans.
- 2011 Eisner Award for Best Publication for Kids for Tiny Titans.
- 2014 Eisner Award for Best Publication for early readers: Itty Bitty Hellboy, by Art Baltazar and Franco.
- 2011 Harvey Award for Best Original Graphic Publication for Younger Readers: "Tiny Titans"

== Bibliography ==
=== Aw Yeah Comics! Publishing ===
- Aw Yeah Comics! #1–2 (2013)
- Peach and the Isle of Monsters #1 (2016)

=== Blindwolf Studios/Electric Milk Comics ===
- Patrick the Wolf Boy #1 (2000)
- Patrick the Wolf Boy: Christmas Special 2000 #1 (2000)
- Patrick the Wolf Boy: Halloween Special #1 (2000)
- Patrick the Wolf Boy: Mother's Day Special 2001 #1 (2001)
- Patrick the Wolf Boy: Next Halloween Special 2001 #1 (2001)
- Patrick the Wolf Boy: Summer Special 2001 #1 (2001)
- Patrick the Wolf Boy: Valentine's Day Special 2001 #1 (2001)

=== Dark Horse Comics ===
- Aw Yeah Comics: Action Cat & Adventure Bug #1–4 (2016)
- Itty Bitty Hellboy #1–5 (2013)
- Itty Bitty Hellboy: The Search for the Were-Jaguar #1–4 (2015–2016)
- Itty Bitty: Маsк

=== DC Comics ===
- Arkhamaniacs SC (2021)
- Batman '66 #12 (2014)
- Billy Batson and the Magic of Shazam! #5–19, 21 (2009–2010)
- DC's Saved by the Belle Reve #1 (2022)
- DCU Halloween Special '09 #1 (2009)
- DCU Holiday Special #1 (2009)
- Deadman Tells the Spooky Tales SC (2022)
- FCBD 2011 Young Justice Batman BB Super Sampler #1 (2011)
- Green Lantern: Larfleeze Christmas Special #1 (2011)
- Green Lantern: The Animated Series #0, 1–9 (2012–2013)
- Green Team: Teen Trillionaires #1–8 (2013–2014)
- Superman Family Adventures #1–12 (2012–2013)
- Super Powers #1–6 (2017)
- Tiny Titans #1–50 (2008–2012)
- Tiny Titans: Return to the Treehouse #1–6 (2014–2015)
- Young Justice vol. 2 #1–6 (2011)

=== DC Comics and Archie Comics ===
- Tiny Titans/Little Archie #1–3 (2010–2011)

=== Dynamite Entertainment ===
- Captain Action Cat: The Timestream Catastrophe! #1–4 (2014)

=== Stone Arch Books ===
- Dino-Mike (2015)

=== Little Bee Books ===
- Fae and the Moon (2023)
