= Jokermobile =

Automobile of DC Comics supervillain Joker

- The Jokermobile on the cover of Batman #37 (October 1946), art by Jerry Robinson.

Publication information
- Publisher: DC Comics
- First appearance: Batman #37 (October 1946)
- Created by: Jerry Robinson

In story information
- Type: Vehicle
- Element of stories featuring: Joker; Batman

The Jokermobile (also referred to as Joker-Mobile and Joker Mobile) is a specially designed automobile used by DC Comics supervillain Joker. The Jokermobile debuted in Batman #37 (October 1946), and was created by Jerry Robinson.

== Publication history ==
=== 20th century ===
The first design of the Jokermobile from Batman #37 (October 1946), art by Jerry Robinson.

The Jokermobile made its comic book debut in Batman #37 (October 1946), in which Joker was fed up with Batman's superior gadgetry that played a role in foiling his criminal plots and so decided to build a series of Joker-themed gadgets, like the Jokermobile, for example, his own themed vehicle, similar to Batman's Batmobile. The vehicle had some features that allowed the Joker to perform feats that not even the Batmobile could, such as creating a plank path to go through chasms and large holes. In addition to being white in color to resemble the Joker's skin, the Jokermobile was equipped with machine guns at the rear and front and was also bulletproof. However, this version of the vehicle was soon deactivated after Batman captured the Joker.

In Batman #52 (April 1949), Joker began using a second Jokermobile, designed as a Silver Arrow race car. Aside from having the Joker's face on the front, it is unknown if this version had any features like its predecessor. In World's Finest Comics #61 (November 1952), the Joker designed a third Jokermobile, which he used to move around Gotham City; he did not use this vehicle for any criminal activities in particular. Shortly afterward, the Joker returned to the first model of the Jokermobile in World's Finest Comics #88 (June 1957), and used it during his alliance with Lex Luthor in Metropolis. In The Joker #4 (December 1975), Joker then used the Jokermobile during his short-lived crime spree in Star City, where he kidnapped Dinah Lance (the second Black Canary). He was eventually stopped by Green Arrow, who caused the Joker to crash the Jokermobile on the Archway Bridge. The front of the vehicle was damaged, but it could still function. After that, Joker traveled to Wisconsin with the Jokermobile.

After a long period of inactivity, the Joker used his vehicle in Batman #321 (March 1980), to kidnap Commissioner Gordon and lure Batman into a trap. In The Brave and the Bold #191 (October 1982), the Joker then used his vehicle to get Batman's attention and stun him with a giant boxing glove that emerged from the trunk.

=== 21st century ===
The Jokermobile was retired in Gotham City Sirens (December 2009), when Joker started dating Harley Quinn. Eventually, he took it out for one last round per Harley's pleading, though it was permanently retired after he shot some teenagers for making fun of him in it.

In the "Joker War" storyline, Joker acquires Batman's fortune and uses it to convert a fleet of Batmobiles into Jokermobiles.

== In other media ==
=== Television ===
- The Jokermobile appears in the DC Animated Universe series Batman: The Animated Series and The New Batman Adventures.
- The Jokermobile appears in Batman: The Brave and the Bold.

=== Film ===
The Jokermobile appears in Suicide Squad. This version is a modified Infiniti G35.

=== Video games ===
- The Jokermobile appears in Lego Batman 3: Beyond Gotham and Lego DC Super-Villains.
- The Jokermobile appears in Batman: Arkham Knight as a corrupted version of the Batmobile that Batman sees in a hallucination caused by Scarecrow's fear toxin.
- The Jokermobile appears in Batman: The Enemy Within.
- The Arkham Knight iteration of the Jokermobile appears in Lego Batman: Legacy of the Dark Knight. Unlike in Arkham Knight, this Jokermobile is actually drivable.

== See also ==
- List of fictional cars
