= Little Archie =

American comic book series

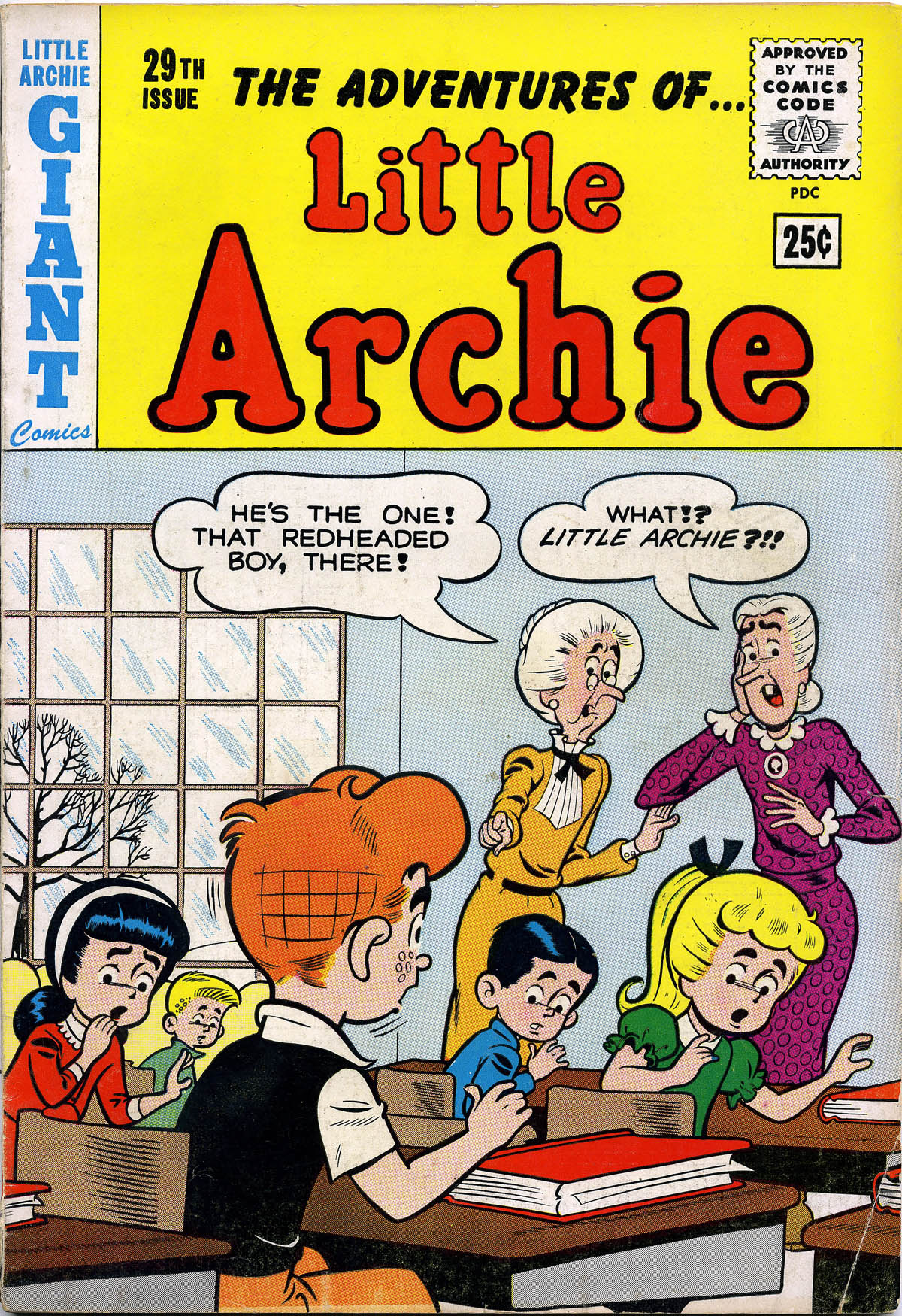
- Cover of The Adventures of Little Archie #29 (Winter 1963-64)

Publication information
- Publisher: Archie Comics
- Genre: Humor
- Publication date: 1956 – 1983
- No. of issues: 180

Little Archie is a comic book published by Archie Comics from 1956 to 1983, lasting 180 issues. Little Archie #1 is considered to be "scarce" by the Overstreet Comic Book Price Guide (only 20-100 copies exist). Among the artists and writers who drew the series were Bob Bolling and Dexter Taylor

== Development ==
According to the introduction in The Best of Archie, the idea for Little Archie came about during a poker game. John Goldwater was playing cards with some of the other comic book publishers one night and they began to kid him about his Archie comics. They told him: "Here we publish all types of comic books and you make an empire just out of Archie. All your books are Archie this or Archie that or Big Archie or Little Archie..." Inspired, Goldwater added Little Archie in 1956.

Bob Bolling wrote and drew the comic strip, which introduced new plots and characters to the Archie legend by concentrating on the adventures of the gang during their early elementary-school days. Dexter Taylor succeeded him on the series.

== Overview ==
Little Archie featured Archie and his friends as elementary school-aged children. It is arguably the most successful of the alternate versions of Archie. The world of Little Archie is remarkably similar to that of his teenage counterpart. Most of the same characters are featured, albeit usually in younger versions. Miss Grundy and Mr. Weatherbee appear as a teacher and the principal at Riverdale Elementary School. Little Archie is always referred to and addressed as "Little Archie". Although stories featuring one of the other characters would be titled "Little Jughead", "Little Betty" and so on, the characters themselves were always addressed by their regular names. Designed for a younger target audience, Little Archie stories tended to have more educational and moral content than regular Archie stories marketed towards tween readers.

In addition to the main comic, The Adventures of Little Archie, there were also the spin-offs Little Archie in Animal Land (1957-1958) and Little Archie Mystery (1963), which put the characters in a more realistically drawn setting.

=== Little Archie Digest Magazine ===
First edition of the infamous relaunch.

In 1991, there was a radical redesign of the Little Archie universe. Renamed as Little Archie Digest Magazine but known informally as "The New Little Archie", it featured the Little Archie characters with contemporary fashions, hairstyles, and sensibilities, and with a more modern-looking art style, yet giving the cartoonish look solely to kid characters (similar to Tiny Toon Adventures and A Pup Named Scooby-Doo) while leaving the adults in their standard designs. One notable change was that Archie was now addressed merely as "Archie" and no longer "Little Archie". This relaunch was condemned by fans of the original incarnation, not only due to the young gang's portrayals as comedic rather than innocent, but also owes to several stories depicting adults treating children more unfairly as seen bordering on child abuse. (Note: In the beginning of the story "Ready, Willing, and Cable", Little Archie, skateboarding in the house, is grabbed by the shirt by his dad an yelled at in the same panel.) Ultimately, the Little Archie universe went back to its old style in 1993. As a result, Archie Comics disowned the relaunch, as no stories from the series have ever reprinted, and it is relatively unknown to the new generation readers.

=== World of Archie Double Digest #5 ===
Another redesigned Little Archie, art by Art Baltazar, occurred when it crossed over with the Tiny Titans universe in the fifth issue of World of Archie Double Digest in 2011. Unlike the experience from the early 1990s, this received better attention, as a picture book is currently in the marketplace.

== Characters ==
Many recurring characters appeared only in Little Archie, though several were later introduced in the mainstream comics.

- Abercrombie and Stitch: Two aliens who have visited Little Archie on some adventures.
- Caramel: Betty's golden-haired cat. She originally appeared in Little Archie, but would later become a frequent character in the main continuity. She continues to make occasional appearances. Betty has owned many cats (Max, Susie, Buddy, Samantha, etc.), but Caramel is the best known and the most frequently appearing.
- Polly and Chic Cooper: Betty's older sister and brother introduced in Little Archie in the 1960s as teenagers. Polly mainly appeared in stories about her "older sister" relationship with Little Betty, while Chic mostly appeared in the adventure-based stories as Little Archie's teenage friend who could fill the role of "adult" when the plot needed a character who could drive a car, fight with the villains, etc. For years, they were not canonical characters in the mainstream Archie comics. However, by the 1990s, they had been integrated into the main continuity. Both have strawberry-blonde hair, are currently in their twenties and are close to each other in age, but are significantly older than Betty (Polly still affectionately calls her "baby sister" on occasion). To explain why they rarely appear in the comics, it was established that Polly works as a television news reporter in San Francisco, and Chic works as a secret agent for the United States government. Both occasionally visited their family, though Polly made more appearances. Around 2005, it was revealed that Polly had accepted a job in Riverdale, and she now appears often, mainly in the Betty comic book.
- Mad Doctor Doom & Chester: Not to be confused with Marvel Comics' Doctor Doom, Mad Doctor Doom is a green-skinned mad scientist who has terrorized Archie and the gang since they were children, as they constantly foiled his plans of gaining great wealth and conquering the world. Doom was assisted by Chester, his nitwitted, teenaged slacker of an assistant (occasionally said to be his nephew). Chester looks and acts like a stereotypical 1950s juvenile delinquent. They both made at least one appearance in the mainstream comics.
- Evelyn Evernever: A young girl who was acquainted with Archie and friends when they were young. Evelyn was a shy girl with a bit of an inferiority complex, with tenuous relations to the rest of the gang. Her only real friend was her doll, Minerva. Evelyn Evernever likes to think of herself as a "bou'tiful" gal. After a long hiatus Evelyn Evernever reappears as a teenage girl who kidnapped Archie in a recent all-out action issue of Betty & Veronica Spectacular. It was shown in a recent issue of Veronica that Evelyn was Archie's first kiss.
- Fangs Fogarty: A fat, snaggle-toothed bully who tormented Archie, Jughead and Reggie in their younger years. Fangs was an unreasonable thug who brutally battered his classmates, either because they looked at his self-appointed girlfriend Penny, they insulted him behind his back, or for no reason at all. He was, however, good friends with Dilton. When, in one story, Archie and Reggie (not yet knowing this) learned that Dilton is a karate expert—surpassed, he says, only by his friend Edward—they persuaded him to confront Fangs, presuming Dilton could beat him up. In preparation for the encounter, Archie and Reggie deliberately provoked Fangs into a fit of rage. However, when Dilton arrived, he cheerfully greeted Fangs as "Edward." Presumably, Fangs moved away at around the time Moose Mason arrived in Riverdale. Fangs eventually showed up in the mainstream comics in a story titled "Blast from the Past", first printed in Archie's Double Digest #117 (August 2000). Now a tall, muscular, handsome young man nicknamed Smiley after getting his orthodontic work, he had returned to Riverdale to apologize to those he had formerly antagonized. In this story Fangs' first name is given as Fred instead of Edward.
- Bubbles McBounce: Bubbles McBounce was an obese girl from Little Archie. Being heavier than the other kids, she is known for such moments as the time she saved the day by holding down an air balloon that risked taking Archie and the gang on a magical voyage.
- Penny Peabody: Fangs Fogarty's girlfriend. Their relationship is exactly like Moose and Midge's: Fangs will hurt any boy who even talks to Penny.
- The Perilous Pike: A pike that lives in Logger's Pond, a large pond near Riverdale. No one has ever caught the Perilous Pike, though some people have almost caught him. In some stories, attempts to fish for him cause the Pike to attack a member of Archie's gang.
- Ambrose Pipps: A small, shy boy with a large nose and an outsized baseball cap pulled over his face. Like Fangs Fogarty, most of his appearances have been in the Little Archie series. Ambrose was the tagalong of Archie's gang when they were young. Although Ambrose's loyalty was unflagging, Little Archie took pride in bullying and exploiting him, without ever letting him join the "good ol' gang." Although a teenage Archie was apprehensive when Ambrose returned to Riverdale after several years' absence, Ambrose held no grudges, and the two became good friends. In the story "The Great Quiz Whiz Contest" reprinted in Archie's Pals 'n' Gals #108, Archie pulls out his lucky double sided penny from his pocket that his pal Ambrose gave him. Both Ambrose and Fangs have very brief cameos in Tales From Riverdale #24. Ambrose was re-introduced more recently as an adult in Life with Archie: The Married Life, depicted as running a small diner in New York City long after he left Riverdale.
- The Southside Serpents: A gang of kids who were the rivals of Little Archie's gang and lived in the southern district of Riverdale. They filled the role of Central High Students when a rival group was needed.
- Spotty: Little Archie's brown dog with black spots. He appeared primarily in Little Archie, as an honorary member of the gang, so he has been known to tag along with them on their adventures. He has a close relationship with his master, and Little Archie often worries about him being in danger. Spotty has made a few appearances in the main continuity, usually shown as an older, less active dog. His most recent appearance in mainstream continuity was Archie's Double Digest #196 in 2009.
- Sue Stringly: Sue was a poor little girl who knew Archie and the gang when they were young. Sue's family didn't have much money, and they lived in a shack near the railway tracks. Despite this, Sue was an upbeat, cheerful girl who never complained or despaired over her predicament. While most of the school students didn't want anything to do with her, eventually Sue became good friends with Little Archie and Veronica. Her father was sometimes said to be working in a pickle plant. Sue also lived next to a coal mine. In one story, she was called a cousin of Veronica Lodge. Although her hair is blonde, she bears a resemblance to Big Ethel. After a long hiatus right after Evelyn Evernevers return, Sue Stringly reappears as a teenage secret agent who rescues Archie and befriends Betty & Veronica (Agent B & Agent V) in a recent issue of Betty & Veronica Digest.

== See also ==
- List of Archie Comics publications
