= Associated British Motors Orbit =

The Orbit is a car from the fictional Associated British Motors company and featured in a short-lived British Television programme On The Line from Central Television. The programme aired in 1982 with 13 epispodes but the series was not extended and the two bespoke Orbit cars were offered up as prizes to readers of the TV Times in June 1982.

The Orbit 1300 is based on the first generation Ford Fiesta. With the assistance of Custom Car magazine, Slick Tricks Racing reworked the front and rear featuring new lights from a Ford Capri and a new bonnet, grille and bumpers and the wheels were changed to Ford Escort ones.
