= Art Baltazar =

American comics artist and writer

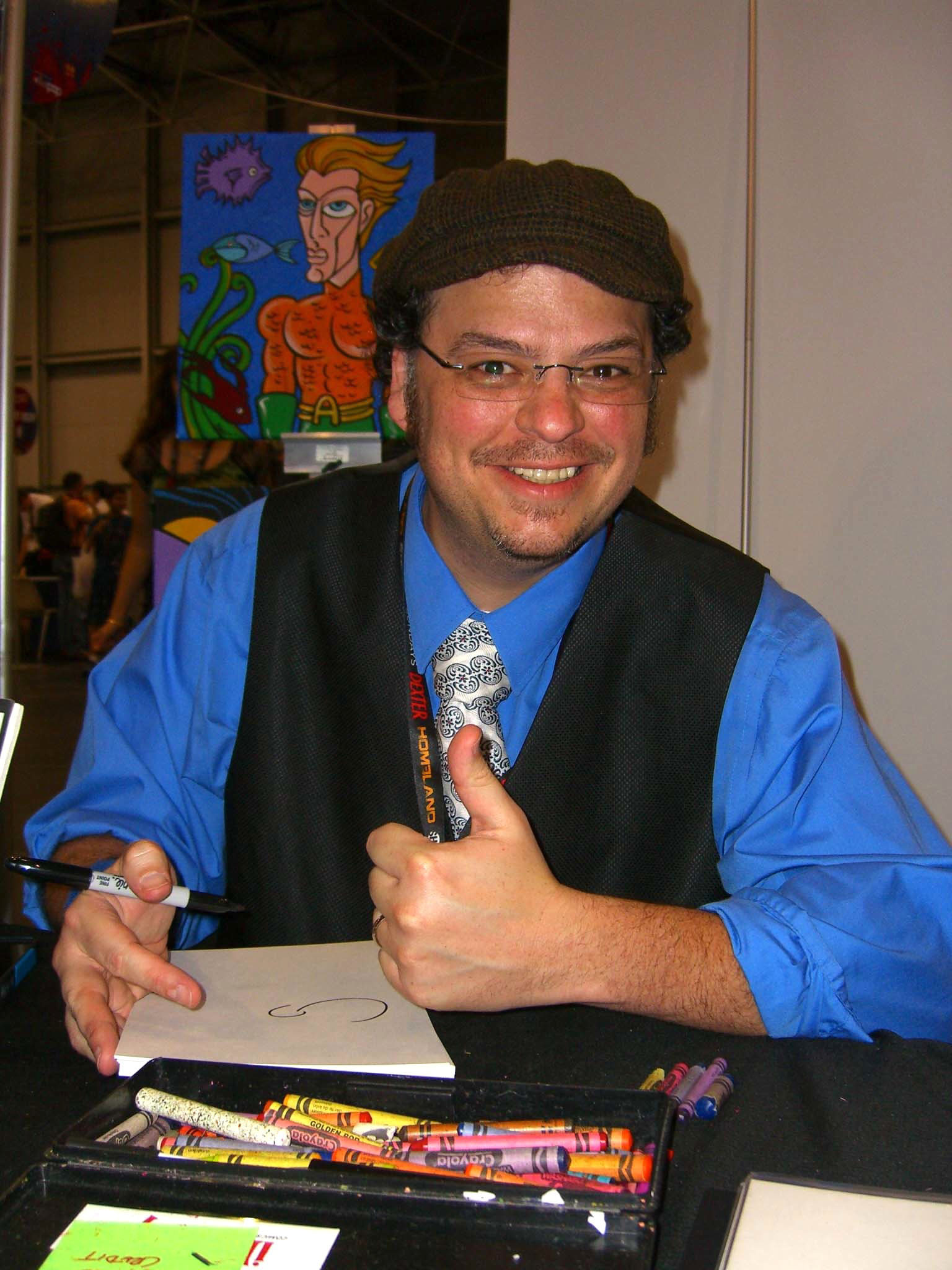
- Baltazar at the 2011 New York Comic Con
- Born: 1968 (age 57–58)
- Areas: Cartoonist, Writer, Penciller
- Notable works: The Cray-Baby Adventures; Gyro-Man; Captain Camel & the Space Chicken; Jimmy Dydo
- Awards: 2011 Eisner Award for Best Publication for Kids

Arthee "Art" Baltazar (born 1968) is an American comics artist and writer who currently works for DC Comics.

== Career ==
Art Baltazar started making comic books with his self-published comic book, The Cray-Baby Adventures. Since then he has created such other comics as Gyro-Man, Captain Camel & the Space Chicken, Jimmy Dydo, Lunar Lizard, Meteor Mite, and Patrick the Wolf Boy.

Baltazar briefly worked with Warner Bros. and had a monthly comic strip in Disney Adventures Magazine titled "Gorilla Gorilla!". Baltazar has completed a graphic novel titled The Big Amoeba for Platinum Studios.

Baltazar was the artist and co-writer with Franco Aureliani of Tiny Titans, for which the two won a 2011 Eisner Award for Best Publication for Kids. The Baltazar and Aureliani team co-wrote DC's Billy Batson and the Magic of Shazam! and the comic book adaptation of the animated TV series Young Justice. In 2011, Capstone Publishers began publishing a series of DC Super-Pets books illustrated by Baltazar. In 2012, Baltazar founded a comic book shop in Skokie, Illinois with his partner and co-owner Franco Aureliani. That same year, DC launched a new series titled Superman Family Adventures which was written and drawn by Baltazar and Aureliani. Fuzzy, the Krypto Mouse, a character who appeared in a single story in Superboy #65 (June 1958), inspired a similar character created by Baltazar for Superman Family Adventures. In 2013, Baltazar and Aureliani launched a revival of The Green Team for DC. That series was cancelled in January 2014.

== Awards ==
- 2011 Eisner Award for Best Publication for Kids for Tiny Titans.

== Bibliography ==
=== Books ===
==== Capstone Publishers ====
- Ace: The Origin of Batman's Dog, 2017 - written by Steve Korte
- The Amazing Mini-Mutts, 2012 - written by Donald Lemke
- Attack of the Invisible Cats, 2011 - written by Scott Sonneborn
- Backward Bowwow, 2011 - written by Sarah Hines Stephens
- Barnyard Brainwash, 2012 - written by John Sazaklis
- Battle Bugs of Outer Space, 2011 - written by Jane B. Mason
- The Biggest Little Hero, 2012 - written by John Sazaklis
- Candy Store Caper, 2012 - written by John Sazaklis
- The Cat Crime Club, 2012 - written by Steve Korte
- DC Super-Pets Character Encyclopedia, 2013 - written by Steve Korte
- Deep-sea Duel, 2012 - written by John Sazaklis
- The Fantastic Flexy Frog, 2012 - written by Michael Dahl
- The Fastest Pet on Earth, 2011 - written by J. E. Bright
- Heroes of the High Seas, 2011 - written by J. E. Bright
- The Hopping Hero, 2011 - written by John Sazaklis
- Jumpa: The Origin of Wonder Woman's Kanga, 2017 - written by Steve Korte
- Midway Monkey Madness, 2011 - written by Sarah Hines Stephens
- Night of the Scaredy Crows, 2012 - written by Sarah Hines Stephens
- Pooches of Power!, 2011 - written by Sarah Hines Stephens
- Royal Rodent Rescue, 2011 - written by John Sazaklis
- Salamander Smackdown!, 2011 - written by John Sazaklis
- Sleepy Time Crime, 2012 - written by Sarah Hines Stephens
- Starro and the Space Dolphins, 2012
- Streaky: The Origin of Supergirl's Cat, 2017 - written by Steve Korte
- Super Hero Splash Down, 2011 - written by Jane B. Mason
- Super-Pets Showdown, 2012 - written by Sarah Hines Stephens
- Superpowered Pony, 2011 - written by Sarah Hines Stephens
- Swamp Thing vs the Zombie Pets, 2012 - written by John Sazaklis

=== Comic books ===
==== Action Lab Comics ====
- Miraculous: Adventures of Ladybug & Cat Noir: FCBD 2018 (Sami the Samurai Squirrel backup story) (2018)
- Powers in Action #1–4 (2018–2020)

==== Archie Comics ====
- World of Archie Double Digest #5 (2011)

==== Aw Yeah Comics! Publishing ====
- Aw Yeah Comics! #1–2 (2013)

==== Blindwolf Studios / Electric Milk Comics ====
- Captain Camel and the Space Chicken #1 (2001)
- Patrick the Wolf Boy #1 (2000)
- Patrick the Wolf Boy: Christmas Special 2000 #1 (2000)
- Patrick the Wolf Boy: Halloween Special #1 (2000)
- Patrick the Wolf Boy: Mother's Day Special 2001 #1 (2001)
- Patrick the Wolf Boy: Next Halloween Special 2001 #1 (2001)
- Patrick the Wolf Boy: Summer Special 2001 #1 (2001)
- Patrick the Wolf Boy: Valentine's Day Special 2001 #1 (2001)

==== Dark Horse Comics ====
- Aw Yeah Comics: Action Cat & Adventure Bug #1–4 (2016)
- Itty Bitty Hellboy #1–5 (2013)
- Itty Bitty Hellboy: The Search for the Were-Jaguar #1–4 (2015–2016)

==== DC Comics ====
- Ambush Bug: Year None #7 (2009)
- Batman '66 #12 (2014)
- Billy Batson and the Magic of Shazam! #5–21 (2009–2010)
- Cartoon Network Action Pack #32 (2009)
- DCU Halloween Special '09 #1 (2009)
- DCU Holiday Special #1 (2009)
- FCBD 2011 Young Justice Batman BB Super Sampler #1 (2011)
- Green Lantern: Larfleeze Christmas Special #1 (2011)
- Green Lantern: The Animated Series #0, #1–3, 5–7, 9 (2012–2013)
- Green Team: Teen Trillionaires #1–8 (2013–2014)
- Harley Quinn vol. 2 #0 (2014)
- Superman Family Adventures #1–12 (2012–2013)
- Superman of Smallville graphic novel (2019)
- Super Powers vol. 4 #1–6 (2017)
- Tiny Titans #1–50 (2008–2012)
- Tiny Titans / Little Archie #1–3 (2010–2011)
- Tiny Titans:Return to the Treehouse #1–6 (2014–2015)
- Young Justice vol. 2 #1–6 (2011)

==== Dynamite Entertainment ====
- Captain Action Cat: The Timestream Catastrophe! #1–4 (2014)

==== Lion Forge ====
- Encounter #1–10 (2018–2019)

==== Papercutz ====
- Papercutz Free Comic Book Day #13 (2019)
