= Tiny Titans =

Comic book series by Art Baltazar and Franco Aureliani

- Cover to Tiny Titans #1 (April 2008), art by Art Baltazar.

Publication information
- Publisher: DC Comics (Johnny DC)
- Schedule: Monthly
- Format: Ongoing series
- Genre: Superhero
- Publication date: April 2008 – May 2012; 2014–2015
- No. of issues: 56
- Main character(s): Robin; Speedy; Wonder Girl; Starfire; Beast Boy; Cyborg; Raven; Cassie; Kid Flash; Aqualad

Creative team
- Written by: Art Baltazar; Franco Aureliani
- Artist: Art Baltazar

Tiny Titans is a comic book series by Art Baltazar and Franco Aureliani. It was published by DC Comics, beginning publication in February 2008. The first issue was also released as part of the annual Free Comic Book Day promotion in May 2008. The series concluded its run with the 50th issue, released in March 2012 (cover dated in May). During its history, Tiny Titans won the Eisner Award for Best Series for Kids twice, in 2009 and 2011. In 2014–15, the series was revived as Tiny Titans: Return to the Tree House, a six-issue miniseries. In 2010, a three-issue crossover with Archie Comics, Tiny Titans/Little Archie, was published with the Tiny Titans creative team.

Tiny Titans stars alternate versions of DC Universe characters, primarily those from the Teen Titans series. It is set in a kid-friendly, elementary school environment. Issues typically consist of several individual stories as opposed to one cohesive storyline. The stories feature many references to pop culture and elements of the mainline DC Comics continuity, including Darkseid, the Monitor and Anti-Monitor, Final Crisis, and Batman: Battle for the Cowl.

== Characters ==
Although the stories feature a wide variety of characters, several are part of recurring jokes:

- Robin is one of the more featured characters and is generally considered the leader, though no one seems to take him seriously. Robin briefly changes his name and costume to Nightwing, but still fails to garner any respect.
- Beast Boy and Terra appear as part of a one-sided relationship, in which Terra responds to Beast Boy's romantic advances by throwing rocks at him.
- Deathstroke (Slade) is the principal of the kids' school, Sidekick City Elementary. The kids tend to think of Slade as a mean guy, and they are usually right.
- Psimon is often called Brainiac because of his exposed brain, and he always has to remind Wonder Girl what his name is, but she does not listen.
- Jericho, Wildebeest, Kid Devil, and Miss Martian are part of a junior group called the Little Tiny Titans and are frequently babysat by the other Titans. Jericho frequently uses his ability to possess others for his friends' benefit and amusement.

== Collected editions ==
| Vol. # | Title | Material collected | Pages | ISBN |
|---|---|---|---|---|
| 1 | Welcome to the Treehouse | Tiny Titans #1-6 | 144 | 1-40122-078-9 |
| 2 | Adventures in Awesomeness | Tiny Titans #7-12 | 144 | 1-40122-328-1 |
| 3 | Sidekickin' It | Tiny Titans #13-18 | 144 | 1-40122-653-1 |
| 4 | The First Rule of Pet Club... | Tiny Titans #19-25 | 160 | 1-40122-892-5 |
| 5 | Field Trippin' | Tiny Titans #26-32 | 160 | 1-40123-173-X |
| 6 | The Treehouse and Beyond! | Tiny Titans #33-38 | 144 | 1401233104 |
| 7 | Growing Up Tiny! | Tiny Titans #39-44 | 128 | 1-40123-525-5 |
| 8 | Aw Yeah Titans! | Tiny Titans #45-50 | 128 | 1401238122 |
| (9) | Return to the Treehouse | Tiny Titans: Return to the Tree House #1-6 | 128 | 1401254926 |

== In other media ==
The Tiny Titans versions of Robin, Cyborg, Starfire, Beast Boy, and Raven make a cameo appearance in Teen Titans Go! vs. Teen Titans. In the graphic novel Teen Titans Go! To the Library!, also created by Art Baltazar and Franco Aureliani, the Teen Titans Go! Titans visit the Tiny Titans universe.

== See also ==
- Super Jrs.
- X-Babies
- Mini Marvels
