= Girder and Panel building sets =

Type of model toy

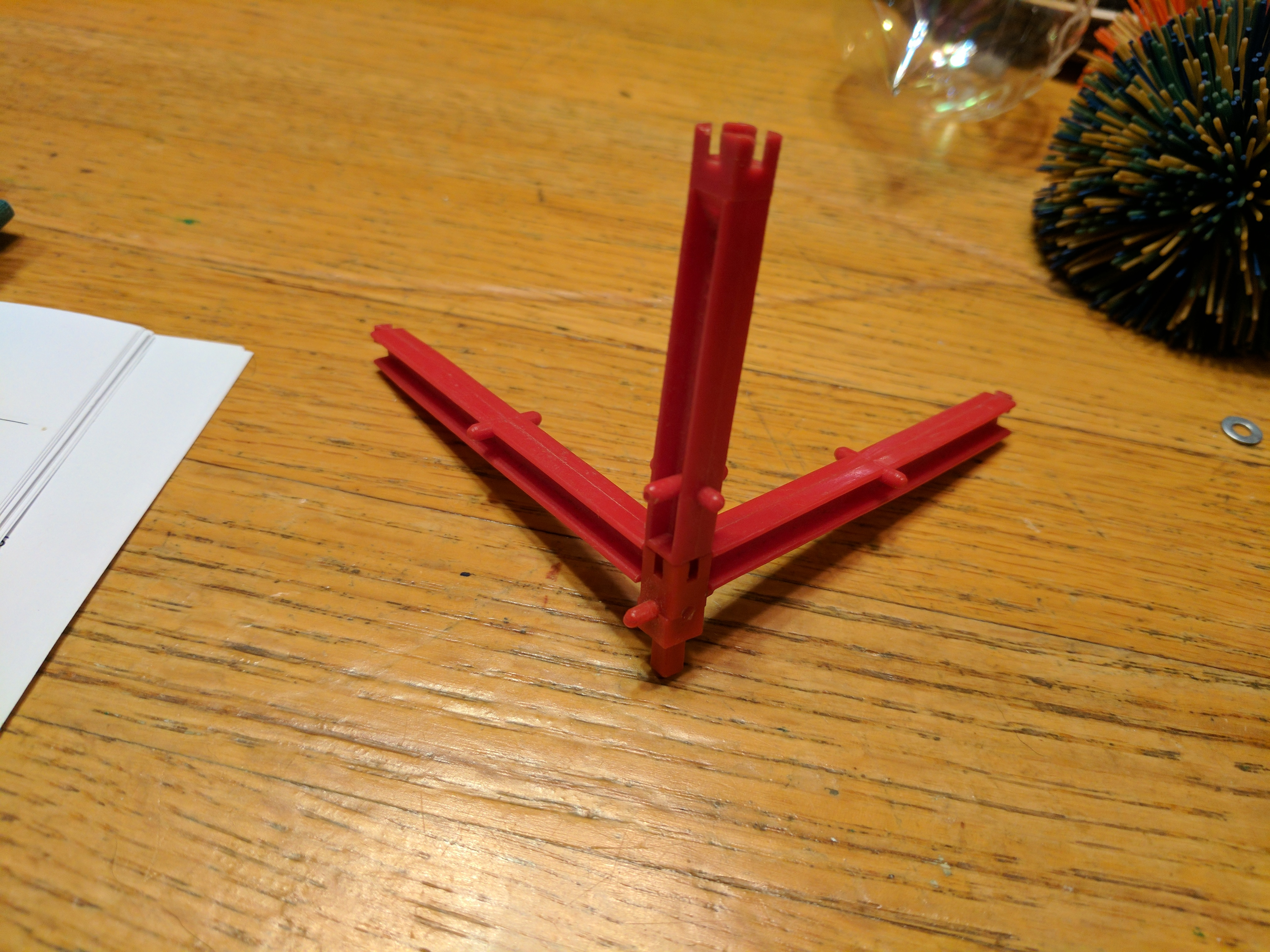
Two beams and one column connected to resemble iron girder construction

Girder and Panel Building Sets were a series of plastic toy construction kits created by Kenner Toys in the mid-1950s. Since then, the building sets have gone in and out of production several times, under a succession of different owners of the designs.

== Overview ==
The Girder and Panel Building Set construction kits enabled a child to build plastic models of mid-twentieth century style buildings. Vertical plastic columns were placed in the holes of a Masonite base board and horizontal girders were then locked into the vertical columns to create the skeletal structure of a model building. Brightly coloured plastic panels containing translucent "windows" could then be snapped onto the outer girders to create a curtain wall. Square navy-blue roof panels—some with translucent skylight domes molded into them—were laid on the topmost beams to complete the structure.

Bridge and Turnpike sets were later introduced that also employed frameworks of girders but with roadway sections instead of curtain wall panels and the addition of truss bracing and other techniques to construct models of various types of bridges, turnpikes, and interchanges. Still later, Kenner introduced sets with plastic-cased battery-operated motors that could be used to construct buildings with elevators, drawbridges that opened and closed, and other motorized structures.

The Girder and Panel construction style emulated twentieth century construction techniques such as curtain walls of prefabricated panels attached to frameworks of girders, trusses, and cantilevers. Girder and Panel toy sets were an important toy in the transition from the metal-based Gilbert Erector Sets of the 1920-to-1950 era to the plastic toys of the modern age. While Lego is arguably the most popular contemporary construction toy, no other toy has replaced Girder and Panel as a direct reflection of modern building techniques.

Girder and Panel products have been produced by several companies since 1957, and from 2005 to 2016 they were still being made by Bridge Street Toys, a privately owned company based in Massachusetts.

== Development ==
The concept for Girder and Panel originated when Kenner president Albert Steiner witnessed the construction of a new office building in Cincinnati in 1956. The steel beam and girder structure of the new building and the steel and glass wall panels later applied to that framework gave Steiner the idea for a new toy. He proposed creating plastic construction toy sets that enabled the child to construct model buildings out of frameworks of red colored girders and beams, with exterior curtain walls, on a foundation board of green Masonite. The specific design of the sets was left to Kenner's James O. Kuhn. His assistant Michael Oppenheim became the product manager for the Girder and Panel product line.

Vertical girders were placed in the holes of the Masonite base board. The top of the square girder had four V-shaped notches. A horizontal beam with a dovetail on each end would then lock into one of the notches on the beam, giving the skeletal structure of the toy building a considerable amount of strength. Tiny pegs protruded from the girders and beams, which then fit into matching holes in the curtain wall pieces, keeping the pieces securely fastened. The girders, beams, and curtain walls from these initial sets were originally molded in polystyrene. But due to negative customer feedback concerning breakage of dovetail ends and the notches in the beams, Kenner quickly switched to using the newly developed polyethylene plastic for the girders and beams, which provided a small amount of flexibility needed to withstand repeated assembly and disassembly of the pieces.

The curtain walls were produced using a "vacuform" method, and were somewhat brittle as a result. Colors of the curtain wall panels were typically bright yellow and reddish-orange, with a variety of white or translucent "windows." Customers were encouraged to cut the panels with scissors, allowing the panels to fit into corners. Square navy blue roof panels lay on top of the beams, and some roof pieces even had translucent skylight domes molded into them.

Kenner typically created two or three sets of different sizes for each theme of the Girder and Panel toy line, offering the buyer a choice of "basic, better (and best)." Thus, the initial theme of "buildings" was offered as sets #1, #2 and #3, with set #3 having the most parts of the group.

The success of this initial group of three sets inspired Kenner to introduce the Bridge and Turnpike sets, which reflected an "interstate roadway" theme. These sets, #4, #5, and #6, employed frameworks of girders too, but with diagonal truss bracing and other techniques to construct models of various types of bridges, turnpikes, and interchanges. The trusses were very flexible, providing tensile strength, but little compressive strength, requiring trusses and cantilevers to be assembled using engineering principles. Unlike Girder and Panel, the Bridge and Turnpike sets featured roadway sections instead of curtain wall panels.

The next set in the series, #7, was the Combined Girder and Panel, Bridge and Turnpike Set, which provided all the parts from the earlier Girder and Panel sets and Bridge and Turnpike sets. With this combination, one could construct models of structures that combined buildings and roadways, such as a bus terminal or hotel in which ramps lead cars and buses directly into and out of the building.

From there, Kenner introduced their all-time best selling sets: The Motorized Girder and Panel, Bridge and Turnpike Building set. Set #8 added a yellow plastic battery-operated motor unit, and set #9 contained two motor units. With these motors, one could construct buildings with elevators, drawbridges that opened and closed by electric motor, and other motorized structures. These sets included yellow plastic pulleys, spools and wheels to be used in conjunction with the motor unit. Kenner even offered a Motorizing Kit, set #10, to let those who owned the earlier Girder and Panel and Bridge and Turnpike sets motorize them.

== Planning new sets ==
With the initial success of the building and interstate road themes, Kuhn and Oppenheim looked for new ideas to expand the product line. Three new trends in society provided the themes for the next line of sets: the widespread use of chemicals, suburban growth by subdivisions, and futurist transportation concepts. The chemical theme would take shape in the new Hydro-Dynamic sets; the subdivision housing theme would be developed in the Build-A-Home sets; and the futurist transportation theme, embodied by the Disneyland monorail, would result in the Skyrail sets.

=== Hydro-Dynamic Sets ===
The Hydro-Dynamic sets enabled children to be hydraulic engineers, as these sets came with battery-operated pumps, which could pump water through polyvinyl plastic pipes into tanks and back into a plastic tray with a small reservoir. Set #11 had a tray with one pump, and set #12 had a tray with two pumps. Each pump required the use of 2 D-cell batteries that loaded underneath the tray, out of sight. The sets contained many new clear plastic polystyrene parts consisting of spray heads, dippers, turbines, funnels, small and large liquid chambers, and storage tanks.

One could control the flow of the water with valves provided by the sets. Thus, with these sets, one could model structures that employ fluid hydraulics, such as chemical plants, oil refineries, and water treatment plants. Colored dye tablets were included to simulate different types of liquid chemicals. The project booklet included with the set actually suggested a design for a DDT plant, a pesticide that is now banned.

A small amount of classic Girder and Panel and Bridge and Turnpike pieces were included, to allow an office to be built as part of the chemical plant, with roadways leading to it.

=== Build-A-Home Sets ===
As new subdivisions started to spring up around cities beginning in the 1950s and after, Kenner Toys reflected the trend in their Build-A-Home Building sets. The Build-A-Home sets enabled children to construct modern suburban homes, with simulated brickwork or white clapboard siding. New diagonal beams called joists were introduced to permit a low angle pitched roof to be built, and covered with vacuformed plastic roof plates. Styles varied between brick or white vinyl siding. Patios, swimming pools, TV antennas, steeples, chimneys, barbecues, and doghouses were all added as accessories to decorate the home. Molded green polystyrene foam trees along with vacuformed shrubs and vines also provided some crude landscaping.

The basic set was #14, the better set was #15, and the best set of the group was #16. There were no motors or roadway pieces in this group.

=== Skyrail Sets ===
The Skyrail sets introduced yellow girders and beams, different colored window and door panels and battery powered red or blue "Sky Cars" that ran on monorail steel rails from building to building. The sets came in two sizes: a single red car set (17), and the bigger two-car set that contained the blue car (18). The sets that came in the upright storage containers were Set #30 (one car) and Set #31 (two cars) There were no track switches, so the layout was either a completed circuit (circle), or a single line, (red end-of-line bumpers were included to prevent the car(s) from flying off the ends). Unique to these sets (besides the 50s futuristic monorail cars, and the metal rails) was the red clip that fit onto the girders to hold up the metal rails, and some green signs that were only for the Monorail that would seem out of place on the conventional Girder/Panel sets. Holes in the non-conductive rubber, between the upper and lower metal rail parts, fit over the clips. This allowed the rails to be tilted into some spectacular angles. The rails fit together with two protruding pins that fit into the next rail, and so on.

Unlike other Monorail toys, the Skyrail sets had no fixed pillars supporting the rails; the buildings that were made by assembling the girder/panel sets would accept the "clips"; the height, width, and complexity of the layout rested solely on the child's imagination. One drawback was the battery box that supplied power to the rails. The configuration of the interior of the box lid resembled a small upturned plastic stool. When one twisted the directional control atop the battery box, the "stool" inside turned and made the contacts touch. After repeated use, the "legs" of the stool broke off, and the box was useless. When designing the Girder and Panel Skyrail sets, the engineer at Kenner carved the rails out of wood. His statement that the curves were nearly impossible to create so the cars wouldn't hang up on them, demonstrates that this was mostly a single man's endeavor.

=== Later evolution ===
Later, Kenner upgraded their Girder and Panel, Bridge and Turnpike sets by changing the design to the Modern-As-Tomorrow and Freeway USA sets, which introduced grey colored girders and beams, new panels, newly designed and colored roofs, roadway pieces, realistic road signs and other items such as toll booths, sign and lamp posts.

The last sets Kenner made before they sold to General Mills were the Girdermatic sets, which seemed to be based on mechanical structures, rather than buildings. These sets introduced many new parts that are unique to Girdermatic sets, including a new green colored motor and battery controller, round platforms, cog belts, truss assemblies, giant beams, and Ferris wheel rings, with which one could build moving cranes, observation towers, several different types of bridges, industrial plants and mills with conveyors, and amusement rides such as a Ferris Wheel, Incline ride and Whirling swing.

=== CAD-based Girder and Panel Building Set ===
CAD software tailored to the modeling of Girder and Panel Building Sets allows users to build 3D models of anything one could construct with the physical toy. Also known as a Virtual Girder and Panel Building Set, the only currently known software is RogCAD Virtual Girder and Panel Building Set.

== Girder and Panel Set details ==
Here are the original Girder and Panel sets made by Kenner Toys. The parts counts were verified from Kenner Set boxes in Spaced-Out Bob's collection.

Kenner Toys
Set number & name		Date	Pieces
1	Girder and Panel Building Set	1957	104
2	Girder and Panel Building Set	1957	189
3	Girder and Panel Building Set	1957	287
4	Bridge and Turnpike Set	1958	214
5	Bridge and Turnpike Set	1958	330
6	Bridge and Turnpike Set	1958	543
7	Combined Girder and Panel, Bridge and Turnpike	1959	613
8	Motorized Girder and Panel, Bridge and Turnpike	1960	640, later 675
9	Motorized Girder and Panel, Bridge and Turnpike	1960	860, later 921
10	Motorizing Set (adds 1 motor, esp. for sets 1-7)	1960	100
11	Hydrodynamic Building Set (1 motorized pump)	1961	437
12	Hydrodynamic Building Set (2 motorized pumps)	1961	634
14	Build-A-Home Set	1962	111
15	Build-A-Home Set	1962	200
16	Build-A-Home Subdivision Set	1962	410
17	Skyrail Building Set (Flat Box - 1 Skyrail car)	1963	481
18	Skyrail Building Set (Flat Box - 2 Skyrail cars)	1963	753
21	Modern-As-Tomorrow Girder and Panel Building Set	1964	137, later 141
22	Modern-As-Tomorrow Girder and Panel Building Set	1964	234, later 242
23	Modern-As-Tomorrow Girder and Panel Building Set	1964	376, later 381
23C	Modern-As-Tomorrow Building Set (Vertical Box)	1964	382
24	Freeway USA Bridge and Highway Set	1964	246, later 249
25	Freeway USA Bridge and Highway Set	1964	369, later 374
26	Freeway USA Bridge and Highway Set	1964	736
26C	Freeway USA Building Set (Vertical Box)	1964	749
27	Combined Modern-As-Tomorrow/Freeway USA Set	1965	472
28	Combined Modern-As-Tomorrow/Freeway USA Set	1965	675
30	Skyrail Building Set (Vertical Box - 1 Car)	1963	481
31	Skyrail Building Set (Vertical Box - 2 Cars)	1963	753
32	GirderMatic Building Set (1 motor unit)	1965	687
33	GirderMatic Building Set (2 motor units)	1965	945

=== Kenner (when owned by General Mills) ===
By about 1968, the production of Girder and Panel sets had stopped and did not start up again until about 1974, when Kenner, then owned by General Mills, produced the larger 1,100-piece Sears Tower set #72001 with black girders and panels, which could make a 5-foot-tall (1.5 m) model of the Sears Tower. These sets came with white/grey masonite baseboards. This set had 1,226 pieces, with the Sears Tower requiring 1,197 pieces to build.

Kenner Toys then revived the Girder and Panel line with a series of inexpensive sets. The green Masonite base boards were replaced with interlocking plastic plates. The panels were now flexible printed acetate sheets. The following sets were made when Kenner was owned by General Mills:

Kenner (General Mills)
Set number & name		Date	Pieces
72000	Girder and Panel Building Set	1974	363 pieces
72001	Sears Little-Learners World Famous Buildings set (Large edition)	1974	1226 pieces
72011	Sears Little-Learners World Famous Buildings set (Small edition)	1975	744 pieces
72030	Girder and Panel Building Set	1975	252 pieces
72031	Sears Little-Learners version of the 72030 set	1975	
72050-Black	Girder and Panel Building Set with Working Elevator (Black Girders)	1975	549 pieces
72050-Blue	Skyscraper Set with Working Elevator (Blue Girders)	1975	556 pieces
72051	Sears Little-Learners version of the 72050 set	1975	
72062	JC Penney combo set	1975	
72070-Black	Bridge and Highway Action Building Set (Black Girders)	1977	470 pieces
72070-Blue	Bridge & Highway w/ Working Drawbridge (Blue Girders)	1977	470 pieces
72071-Black	Sears Little-Learners version of the 72070 set (Black Girders)	1977	454 pieces
72071-Blue	Sears Little-Learners version of the 72070 set (Blue Girders)	1977	459 pieces
72080	International Airport Action Building Set	1977	325 pieces
72081	Sears Little-Learners version of the 72080 set	1977	401 pieces
72090	Action Bridge and Skyscraper Building Set	1977	800 pieces
72100	KENSTRUCT Building Set	1979	238 pieces
72110	KENSTRUCT Interstate Highway	1979	460 pieces
72130	KENSTRUCT Skyscraper Set	1979	524 pieces
72140	KENSTRUCT Super Set	1979	
72150	KENSTRUCT Girder and Panel / International Airport	1979	410 pieces

=== Irwin Toys Girder and Panel Sets ===
Kenner Toys ceased production of the 72000 series of Girder and Panel sets in 1979, ending the long run with their five "KENSTRUCT" sets. The Girder and Panel trademark seems to have been abandoned by the company. In 1992, Irwin Toys of Toronto, Canada applied to the US Trademark Office for the assumption of the abandoned trademark. Irwin then began an entire new line of Girder and Panel sets unlike any that were made before. There were new blue/grey girders, beams, and new diagonal beams for slanted roofs along with new wall panels and some new plastic items were also added. Initially they produced three sets, called "Town Centre," "City Scape" and "Deluxe Skyscraper". All sets now had an internal light run by two AA batteries.

Beginning in 1996, Irwin produced a second line of specialty sets beginning with the Gas Station set listed below. These sets had very little US distribution and were mainly sold in Canada. The following Girder and Panel sets were made by Irwin Toys:

Irwin Toys
Set number & name		Pieces
55000-Canada	Town Centre / Centreville	215 Pieces
55000-USA	Town Center	215 Pieces
55101	Gas Station / Station-Service	133 Pieces
55102	Fast Food / Restaurant Rapide	133 Pieces
55120-Architect	The Architect / Architecte	263 Pieces
55120-Canada	City Scape / Edifice Urbain	302 Pieces
55120-USA	City Scape	302 Pieces
55130-Canada	Deluxe Skyscraper / Gratte-Ciel Luxueux	554 Pieces
55130-USA	Deluxe SkyScraper	554 Pieces
55135	Roadside Café / Halte Routier	246 Pieces
55201	Police Station / Commissariat De Police	299 Pieces
55202	Fire Station / Caserne Des Pompiers	299 Pieces
55301	City Centre / Centre-ville	591 Pieces
55302	Emergency Centre / Poste De Secours	589 Pieces

=== Bridge Street Toys Girder and Panel Sets ===
From 2005 until 2016, the Girder and Panel were again marketed by Bridge Street Toys. They created a number of different sets, along with compatible parts for the older Kenner Toys and Irwin Toys sets:

(The last two digits of the set # indicate its year of introduction.)

Bridge Street Toys
Set number & name		Pieces	Information Link
1010BANK105	Tektôn Bank	113 Pieces	
1010FIRE105	Tektôn Fire Station	97 Pieces	
1010GNP205	Tektôn Tower Building	278 Pieces	
1010GNP305	Tektôn Plaza Building	525 Pieces	
2020BNT105	Tektôn Truss Bridge	259 Pieces	
2020BNT205	Tektôn Bridge Mania	473 Pieces	
3030HYDRO206	Hydrodynamic Starter Set	211 pieces	
3030HYDRO306	Hydrodynamic Deluxe Set	316 Pieces	
3111HYDRO406	Industrial Building Expansion Kit	54 Pieces	
3111HYDRO506	Roadway Expansion Kit	50 Pieces	
3111HYDRO606	Spare Tanks Expansion Kit	24 Pieces	
3111HYDRO706	Pipes and Values Expansion Kit	22 Pieces	
1010GNP407	Boston Manor	273 Pieces	
1010GNP510	Clarksville Elementary School	210 Pieces	
1010GNP610	Post Office	133 Pieces	
1010GNP710	Children's Museum	298 Pieces	
1010GNP810	Goose Hollow Town House	97 Pieces	
1010GNP910	Inman Park Town House	97 Pieces	

Bridge Street Toys created two prototype sets that were never officially released for sale. www.girderandpanel.net obtained the only 11 copies of each of these sets. Eleven of the Toy Store and 10 of the Police Station sets were sold, leaving the one remaining set still available.

Bridge Street Toys Unreleased Sets
Set number & name		Pieces	Information Link
1010GNP513	Police Station	187 Pieces	
1010GNP613	Toy Store	140 Pieces	

In 2005, Bridge Street Toys created a special set for investors and family members as a Christmas gift:

Bridge Street Toys Gift Set
Set number & name		Pieces	Information Link
2005 Christmas Set	Tektôn Toy Store	33 Pieces	

== See also ==
- Construx
- Lego
- Lincoln Logs
- Lionel Corp. briefly made a construction set in the immediate postwar era
- Märklin
- Meccano
- Merkur sets
- Skyline
- Super City
- Tinkertoy
- Unit beams
