= McVickers =

McVickers may refer to:

- McVickers Theater, a lavish playhouse that was in Chicago, Illinois
- John McVickers, a 19th-century Irish footballer
- McVickers, former name of Rainbow Crafts

== See also ==
- Noah McVicker, inventor of Play-Doh
