= Kutol =

Kutol may refer to:

- Kutol Products Company
- Kutol (village), village in Abkhazia

== See also ==
- Ruth Kutol (born 16 May 1973), Kenyan long-distance and marathon runner
