= Liquid latex =

Compound used for special effects makeup

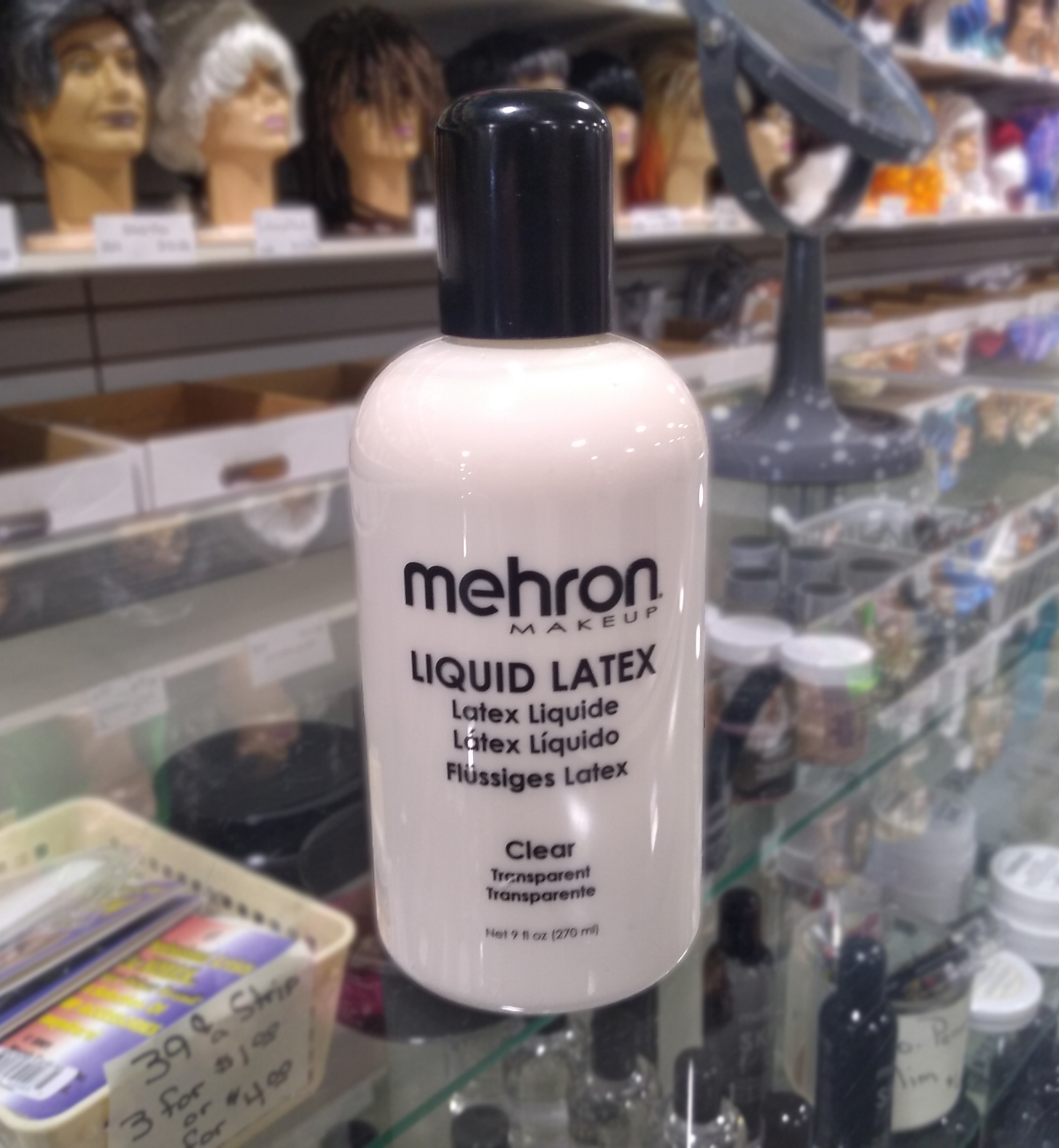
A bottle of Mehron brand liquid latex

Liquid latex is a rubber mixture often used for special effects makeup, body painting, mask making, and casting applications.

== Composition ==
Liquid latex is usually made of 33% latex, 66% water, and less than 1% ammonia (to increase shelf life and control pH). The exact amount of ammonia can vary based on intended use; cosmetic liquid latex contains approximately 0.3% ammonia, while craft and mould-making liquid latex can contain more than double this amount, giving the latter a much stronger odour.

Liquid latex is sold in volumes ranging from 2 ounces to 1 gallon. Its consistency is similar to latex house paint and can be augmented with the use of additives, such as water to thin the latex and Aerosil to thicken it.

Liquid latex is naturally clear and dries into a translucent amber colour. Manufacturers add pigments or acrylic to provide opaque paint choices in multiple colours. The colour in the jar may initially look chalky or pale, but as it dries, it develops into a rich colour.

Because of liquid latex's tendency to stick to itself as it dries, most manufacturers offer a slick spray to remove tackiness. Alternatively, powder can be dusted over dried liquid latex to create metallic effects. Liquid latex's tackiness makes it useful as an adhesive for attaching items such as zippers. Unlike most body and face paints, liquid latex is removed by peeling it off, since water does not reactivate it.

== Applications ==
=== Cosmetics ===
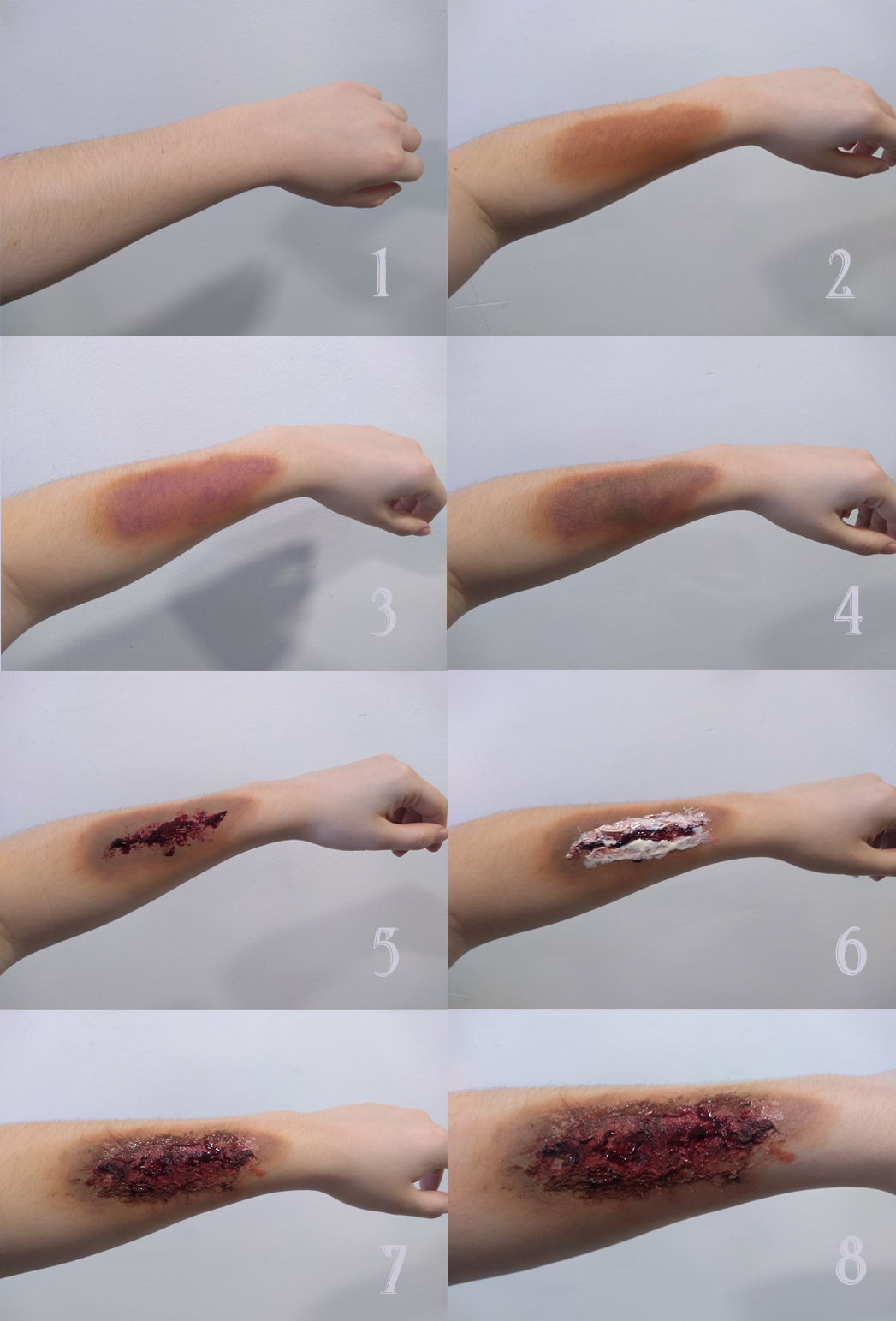
A step-by-step demonstration of the making of a special effect wound.

One 4-US-fluid-ounce (120 ml) jar of liquid latex can typically cover an average human body. It is typically applied using a disposable sponge and takes about five to ten minutes to dry depending on how thickly it is applied. As it dries, it takes on a rubbery consistency, shrinking by approximately 3%.

Flesh-colored latex is applied to the skin for special effects makeup and built up using materials such as tissue paper and cotton. Removing latex from skin can cause pain or pull body hairs out, similar to waxing.

=== Mold making ===
Liquid latex is useful for molding due to its flexibility once dried, which allows for the casting of undercut sculpture. Methods for making a latex mold include the brush method, which involves painting 8 to 20 layers of liquid latex onto an object, and the dip method, which is used for porous objects that can draw moisture from the liquid.

== Safety ==
Due to the presence of ammonium hydroxide, liquid latex may cause skin irritation and eye irritation. Liquid latex intended for mold-making may cause serious eye irritation.

Latex is also a common allergen and may trigger an allergic reaction in some people. The most severe reactions happen immediately and are categorized as an immediate hypersensitivity reaction.

== See also ==
- Latex allergy
- Latex mask
- Prosthetic makeup
- Special effect
