= Play-Doh (sculpture) =

Sculpture by Jeff Koons

- Artist: Jeff Koons
- Year: 2014
- Medium: Painted aluminum
- Dimensions: 300 cm × 270 cm × 270 cm (120 in × 108 in × 108 in)

Play-Doh is a painted aluminum sculpture by Jeff Koons, made between 1994 and 2014. Five copies were made, each measuring approximately 120 × 108 × 108 in. (304.8 × 274.3 × 274.3 cm). It is formed of 27 separate pieces of polychromed aluminum and was first publicly shown at the retrospective of Koons' work in 2014 at the Whitney Museum of American Art in NYC.

== Analysis ==
The title refers to the modeling compound known as Play-Doh which is used for arts and crafts projects by young children.

In reference to the sculpture Play-Doh, Koons has said that he tries to "make objects that you can't make any judgements about". In the same commentary Koons said "If you take Play-Doh apart... they're organic shapes that all stack on top of each other... so that these surfaces are meeting on the inside and you never see that... the public doesn't see it but I think that you feel it and it has kind of a Freudian quality to it. I really thought that Play-Doh captures the twentieth century and you have this aspect of Freud with this mound of Play-Doh and the way the organic shapes are on top of each other... and within art you have this abstract expressionism... you have this aspect of DeKooning or something..."

== Concept ==
Koons explains in Highsnobiety, in a video associated with Christie's, that he originally conceived "Play-Doh" to be a polyethylene sculpture. Koons eventually felt that he could not get the undercuts that he wanted using polyethylene. Koons was unwilling to compromise on the superrealism that he aimed for and opted instead for aluminum. Koons wanted the sculpture to be believable as a mound of Play-Doh. Koons was concerned in the sculpture's development that angles not be too sharp and organic forms not be too organic. This was with the aim of reproducing the appearance of the "Play-Doh" modeling compound on which the sculpture is based.

== Exhibition ==
One of the five iterations of the sculpture was auctioned for 20 million dollars on May 17, 2018.
