= Plastic Galaxy =

Plastic Galaxy: The Story of Star Wars Toys
- Directed by: Brian Stillman
- Written by: Brian Stillman
- Produced by: Brian Stillman; Karl Tate
- Cinematography: Brian Stillman
- Edited by: Brian Stillman
- Music by: Chris Ianuzzi
- Release date: 14 January 2014
- Running time: 70 minutes
- Country: United States
- Language: English

Plastic Galaxy: The Story of Star Wars Toys is a 2014 documentary film directed by Brian Stillman about Kenner's action figures based on the Star Wars franchise.

== Release ==
The film was released on DVD on January 14, 2014. It began streaming on Vimeo on October 3, 2014. It was also released on iTunes in 2014.

== Reception ==
Film Threat described the film as, "well researched and fun to watch," and praised the production design and DVD of the film, but criticized some of the "drama," describing it as, "silly." Jacob Tender of Substream Magazine gave the film five out of five stars, saying "[The film] is a must-have for fans of Star Wars and collectors alike." Writing for Flickering Myth, Amy Richau gave it four out of four stars, saying "...the film is essentially a love letter to Star Wars toys – and a very enjoyable love letter at that." Ian Gormely of Exclaim! gave it a five out of ten star rating, and described it as, "niche even by the extreme standards of Star Wars."
