= Skateboard Smack-Ups =

Toy

Skateboard Smack-ups were a controversial series of plastic figures on skateboards produced in 1986 by Playtime Products, a company which was later acquired by Tyco Toys in 1991. In the vein of Garbage Pail Kids and other '80s gross out humor, the 12 figures depicted children on skateboards being violently maimed by everyday skateboarding obstacles. For example, one figure named "Tammy Tailpipe" is impaled through the face by a car's tailpipe. The violence depicted in the figures led to their being banned by mothers and Parent-Teacher Associations and even banned within Australia by the Australian Competition & Consumer Commission on December 13, 1990.

== Figures ==
- Ronnie Road Kill
- Patty Plate Glass
- Tammy Tailpipe
- Wally Wall Banger
- Sammy Stop Sign
- Amy Asphalt
- Lois Low Branch
- Betty Bumpers
- Rich Stitched
- Timmy Tire Track
- Tony Traffic Cone
- Carrie Car Door

== See also ==
- Garbage Pail Kids
- Savage Mondo Blitzers
- Gross out
