= Star Wars: The Vintage Collection =

Toy line

Star Wars: The Vintage Collection is a line of Star Wars-themed action figures produced by Hasbro Inc., and released under the Kenner brand. The line features modern 'super-articulated' figures in product packaging nearly identical to that of the original Kenner toy series, marketed from 1978 to 1984. The Vintage Collection started in the summer of 2010 and continued with new releases throughout 2012. It was preceded by limited 'vintage' style figure issues that were part of The Original Trilogy Collection (2004) and The Saga Collection (2006) lines.

Hasbro announced at San Diego Comic-Con 2012 that The Vintage Collection would go on hiatus for two years (its return to coincide with the 3D re-releases of the original Star Wars Trilogy starting in 2015), however, that schedule fell in flux due to the planned release of The Force Awakens in 2015, and the line was discontinued.

At Star Wars Celebration Orlando 2017, it was revealed that the line would make a comeback for 2018. The first figure revealed for the lineup was Rey from Star Wars: The Force Awakens. In May 2017, it was announced that Doctor Aphra from Marvel's Darth Vader comic book had won a fan poll to be included in the line as well.

The toy line officially made its return on April 13, 2018.

== The Original Trilogy Collection ==
| Wave | Number | Character | Film/Series | Release date | Description | Accessories |
|---|---|---|---|---|---|---|
| | | Princess Leia Organa | A New Hope | | | |
| | | Luke Skywalker | A New Hope | | | |
| | | Ben (Obi-Wan) Kenobi | A New Hope | | | |
| | | Han Solo | A New Hope | | | |
| | | Darth Vader | The Empire Strikes Back | | | |
| | | C-3PO | The Empire Strikes Back | | | |
| | | Yoda | The Empire Strikes Back | | | |
| | | Lando Calrissian | The Empire Strikes Back | | | |
| | | Stormtrooper | Return of the Jedi | | | |
| | | R2-D2 | Return of the Jedi | | | |
| | | Chewbacca | Return of the Jedi | | | |
| | | Boba Fett | Return of the Jedi | | | |

== The Saga Collection ==
| Wave | Number | Character | Film/Series | Release date | Description | Accessories |
|---|---|---|---|---|---|---|
| | | Sand People | A New Hope | | | |
| | | Greedo | A New Hope | | | |
| | | Luke Skywalker (X-Wing Pilot) | A New Hope | | | |
| | | Han Solo (Hoth Outfit) | The Empire Strikes Back | | | |
| | | Imperial Stormtrooper (Hoth Battle Gear) | The Empire Strikes Back | | | |
| | | Bossk | The Empire Strikes Back | | | |
| | | IG-88 | The Empire Strikes Back | | | |
| | | Luke Skywalker (Bespin Fatigues) | The Empire Strikes Back | | | |
| | | Han Solo (In Trenchcoat) | Return of the Jedi | | | |
| | | Leia Organa (In Combat Poncho) | Return of the Jedi | | | |
| | | Biker Scout | Return of the Jedi | | | |

== The Vintage Collection ==
"Wave" column denotes wave of original release. Some figures were re-released with later waves. The Sandtrooper figure was released as both VC014 and VC112.

| Wave | Number | Character | Film/Series | Release date | Description | Accessories |
|---|---|---|---|---|---|---|
| 1 | VC001 | Dengar | The Empire Strikes Back | | | Blaster rifle, blaster pistol, backpack, codpiece |
| 1 | VC002 | Leia (Hoth Outfit) | The Empire Strikes Back | | | |
| 1 | VC003 | Han Solo (Echo Base) | The Empire Strikes Back | | | |
| 1 | VC004 | Luke Skywalker (Bespin Fatigues) | The Empire Strikes Back | | | |
| 1 | VC005 | AT-AT Commander | The Empire Strikes Back | | Not identified as General Veers | Blaster, armor piece, helmet, goggles, imperial officer cap |
| 1 | VC006 | C-3PO | The Empire Strikes Back | | | face plate, chest plate, leg plate, back control panel, removable right leg |
| 1 | VC007 | Dack Ralter | The Empire Strikes Back | | Should correctly appear as "Dak" | |
| 1 | VC008 | Darth Vader | The Empire Strikes Back | | | |
| 1 | VC008 | Darth Vader | Return of the Jedi | | "Revenge of the Jedi" card also | |
| 1 | VC009 | Boba Fett | The Empire Strikes Back | | | |
| 1 | VC009 | Boba Fett | Return of the Jedi | | "Revenge of the Jedi" card also | |
| 1 | VC010 | 4-LOM | The Empire Strikes Back | | | Blaster rifle |
| 1 | VC011 | Cloud Car Pilot | The Empire Strikes Back | | | |
| 2 | VC012 | Darth Sidious | Revenge of the Sith | | | |
| 2 | VC013 | Anakin Skywalker | Revenge of the Sith | | Later corrected as Darth Vader | |
| 2 | VC014 | Sandtrooper | A New Hope | | First version - sergeant | Blaster rifle, backpack, pauldron |
| 2 | VC015 | Clone Trooper | Revenge of the Sith | | | |
| 2 | VC016 | Obi-Wan Kenobi | Revenge of the Sith | | | |
| 2 | VC017 | General Grievous | Revenge of the Sith | | | |
| 2 | VC018 | MagnaGuard | Revenge of the Sith | | | |
| 2 | VC019 | Clone Commander Cody | Revenge of the Sith | | | |
| 2 | VC020 | Yoda | Revenge of the Sith | | | |
| 3 | VC021 | Gamorrean Guard | Return of the Jedi | | | 2 battleaxes, vibrolance, helmet |
| 3 | VC022 | Admiral Ackbar | Return of the Jedi | | "Revenge of the Jedi" card also | |
| 3 | VC023 | Luke Skywalker (Jedi Knight Outfit) | Return of the Jedi | | "Revenge of the Jedi" card also | Lightsaber, lightsaber hilt, handcuffs |
| 3 | VC023 | Luke Skywalker (Endor Capture) | Return of the Jedi | | "Revenge of the Jedi" card also | Lightsaber, lightsaber hilt, handcuffs |
| 3 | VC024 | Wooof | Return of the Jedi | | | |
| 3 | VC025 | R2-D2 | Return of the Jedi | | "Revenge of the Jedi" card also | |
| 3 | VC026 | Rebel Commando | Return of the Jedi | | White variant | Helmet, blaster rifle, blaster pistol, backpack, trench coat, helmet |
| 7 | VC026 | Rebel Commando | Revenge of the Jedi | | Black variant | Helmet, blaster rifle, blaster pistol, backpack, trench coat, helmet |
| 3 | VC027 | Wicket W. Warrick | Return of the Jedi | | "Revenge of the Jedi" card also | |
| 3 | VC028 | Wedge Antilles | Return of the Jedi | | | |
| 4 | VC029 | Kit Fisto | Attack of the Clones | | | |
| 4 | VC030 | Zam Wesell | Attack of the Clones | | | |
| 4 | VC031 | Obi-Wan Kenobi | Attack of the Clones | | | |
| 4 | VC032 | Anakin Skywalker (Peasant Disguise) | Attack of the Clones | | | |
| 4 | VC033 | Padmé Amidala (Peasant Disguise) | Attack of the Clones | | | |
| 4 | VC034 | Jango Fett | Attack of the Clones | | | |
| 4 | VC035 | Mace Windu | Attack of the Clones | | | |
| 4 | VC036 | Senate Guard | Attack of the Clones | | | |
| 4 | VC037 | Super Battle Droid | Attack of the Clones | | | |
| 5 | VC038 | Clone Trooper (212th Battalion) | Revenge of the Sith | | | |
| 5 | VC039 | Luke Skywalker (Death Star Escape) | A New Hope | | | |
| 5 | VC040 | R5-D4 | A New Hope | | | |
| 5 | VC041 | Stormtrooper | The Empire Strikes Back | | | Helmet, blaster rifle, blaster |
| 5 | VC042 | Han Solo (Yavin Ceremony) | A New Hope | | | |
| 5 | VC043 | Commander Gree | Revenge of the Sith | | | |
| 6 | VC044 | Luke Skywalker (Dagobah Landing) | The Empire Strikes Back | | | |
| 6 | VC045 | Clone Trooper | Attack of the Clones | | | |
| 6 | VC046 | AT-RT Driver | Revenge of the Sith | | | |
| 6 | VC047 | General Lando Calrissian | Return of the Jedi | | | |
| 6 | VC048 | Weequay (Skiff Master) | Return of the Jedi | | | Vibrolance, blaster pistol |
| 6 | VC049 | Fi-Ek Sirch (Jedi Knight) | Attack of the Clones | | | |
| 8 | VC050 | Han Solo (Bespin Outfit) | The Empire Strikes Back | | | |
| 8 | VC051 | Barriss Offee | Attack of the Clones | | | |
| 8 | VC052 | Rebel Fleet Trooper | A New Hope | | | |
| 8 | VC053 | Bom Vimdin (Cantina Patron) | A New Hope | | | |
| 8 | VC054 | ARC Trooper Commander | Expanded Universe | | | |
| 8 | VC055 | Logray (Ewok Medicine Man) | Return of the Jedi | | | |
| 10 | VC056 | Kithaba (Skiff Guard) | Return of the Jedi | | | Vibrolance |
| 10 | VC057 | Dr. Evazan (Cantina Patron) | A New Hope | | | |
| 10 | VC058 | Aayla Secura | Revenge of the Sith | | | |
| 10 | VC059 | Nom Anor | Expanded Universe | | | |
| 10 | VC060 | Clone Trooper (501st Legion) | Revenge of the Sith | | | |
| | VC061 | Boba Fett (Prototype Armor) | The Empire Strikes Back | | Mail Away Exclusive | |
| 7 | VC062 | Han Solo (in Trench Coat) | Return of the Jedi | | "Revenge of the Jedi" card also | |
| 7 | VC063 | B-Wing Pilot (Keyan Farlander) | Return of the Jedi | | "Revenge of the Jedi" card also | |
| 7 | VC064 | Princess Leia (Slave Outfit) | Return of the Jedi | | "Revenge of the Jedi" card also | |
| 7 | VC065 | Tie Fighter Pilot | Return of the Jedi | | "Revenge of the Jedi" card also | |
| | VC066 | Salacious Crumb | Revenge of the Jedi | | Mini Card, SDCC Exclusive | |
| | VC067 | Mouse Droid | Revenge of the Jedi | | Mini Card, SDCC Exclusive | |
| 8.1 | VC068 | Rebel Soldier (Echo Base) | The Empire Strikes Back | | | |
| 8.1 | VC069 | Bastila Shan | Expanded Universe | | | |
| 8.1 | VC070 | Ponda Baba (Walrus Man) | A New Hope | | | |
| 15 | VC071 | Mawhonic | The Phantom Menace | | 'Movie Heroes' repack | |
| 15 | VC072 | Naboo Pilot | The Phantom Menace | | 'Movie Heroes' repack | 2 Helmets, blaster pistol, cloak |
| 15 | VC073 | Aurra Sing | The Phantom Menace | | 'Movie Heroes' repack | |
| 15 | VC074 | Gungan Warrior | The Phantom Menace | | 'Movie Heroes' repack | |
| 9 | VC075 | Qui-Gon Jinn | The Phantom Menace | | | Lightsaber |
| 9 | VC076 | Obi-Wan Kenobi | The Phantom Menace | | | Lightsaber |
| 9 | VC077 | Ratts Tyerell & Pit Droid | The Phantom Menace | | | |
| 9 | VC078 | Battle Droid | The Phantom Menace | | "2011" figure update | |
| 9 | VC079 | Darth Sidious | The Phantom Menace | | | Lightsaber, lightsaber hilt, plastic hood, cloth cloak |
| 9 | VC080 | Anakin Skywalker Padawan | The Phantom Menace | | | |
| 9 | VC081 | Ben Quadinaros & Otoga-222 | The Phantom Menace | | | Blaster pistol |
| 9 | VC082 | Daultay Dofine | The Phantom Menace | | | |
| 9 | VC083 | Naboo Royal Guard | The Phantom Menace | | | Helmet, blaster |
| 9 | VC084 | Queen Amidala | The Phantom Menace | | Post-Senate outfit | |
| 9 | VC085 | Quinlan Vos | The Phantom Menace | | | Lightsabe, lightsaber hilt, blaster pistol |
| 9 | VC086 | Darth Maul | The Phantom Menace | | First super-articulated version | |
| 11 | VC087 | Luke Skywalker (Lightsaber Construction) | Return of the Jedi deleted scene | | Ball-jointed knees | Lightsaber, lightsaber hilt, lightsaber construction tool, belt, cloak |
| 11 | VC088 | Princess Leia (Sandstorm Outfit) | Return of the Jedi deleted scene | | | |
| 11 | VC089 | Lando Calrissian (Sandstorm Outfit) | Return of the Jedi deleted scene | | | Vibroaxe, blaster pistol, helmet, plastic cloak, cloth cloak, scanning device |
| 11 | VC090 | Colonel Cracken (Millennium Falcon Crew) | Return of the Jedi deleted scene | | | |
| 11 | VC091 | Rebel Pilot (Mon Calamari) | Return of the Jedi deleted scene | | | |
| 12 | VC092 | Anakin Skywalker | The Clone Wars | | | Lightsaber, lightsaber hilt |
| 12 | VC093 | Darth Vader | A New Hope | | New movie-specific version, ball-jointed hips | Lightsaber |
| 12 | VC094 | Imperial Navy Commander | A New Hope | | | |
| 12 | VC095 | Luke Skywalker (Hoth Outfit) | The Empire Strikes Back | | | |
| 12 | VC096 | Darth Malgus | Expanded Universe | | | |
| 13 | VC097 | Clone Pilot Odd Ball | Revenge of the Sith | | | |
| 13 | VC098 | Grand Moff Tarkin | A New Hope | | | Blaster, Mouse Droid |
| 13 | VC099 | Nikto (Skiff Guard) | Return of the Jedi | | | |
| 13 | VC100 | Galen Marek (Starkiller) | Expanded Universe | | | |
| 13 | VC101 | Shae Vizla | Expanded Universe | | | |
| 15 | VC102 | Ahsoka | The Clone Wars | | | |
| 15 | VC103 | Obi-Wan Kenobi | The Clone Wars | | Clone Trooper Armor | |
| 15 | VC104 | Lumat | Return of the Jedi | | | |
| 15 | VC105 | Emperor's Royal Guard | Return of the Jedi | | | |
| 15 | VC106 | Nien Numb | Return of the Jedi | | | |
| 15 | VC107 | Weequay | Return of the Jedi | | | |
| 14 | VC108 | Jar Jar Binks | The Phantom Menace | | 'Lost Line' repack | |
| 14 | VC109 | Clone Trooper Lieutenant | Attack of the Clones | | 'Lost Line' repack | |
| 14 | VC110 | Shock Trooper | Revenge of the Sith | | 'Lost Line' repack | |
| 14 | VC111 | Princess Leia (Bespin Outfit) | The Empire Strikes Back | | 'Lost Line' repack | |
| 14 | VC112 | Sandtrooper | A New Hope | | 2nd version - squad leader; 'Lost Line' repack | |
| 15 | VC113 | Republic Trooper | Expanded Universe | | | |
| 15 | VC114 | Orrimaako (Prune Face) | Return of the Jedi | | | |
| 14 | VC115 | Darth Vader | Return of the Jedi | | 'Lost Line' repack | |
| 17 | VC116 | Rey (Jakku) | The Force Awakens | | | |
| 17 | VC117 | Kylo Ren | The Force Awakens | | | |

== The Vintage Collection Fan Favorites ==
To be released February 2013.

| Wave | Number | Character | Film/Series | Release date | Description | Accessories |
|---|---|---|---|---|---|---|
| | | Darth Maul | The Phantom Menace | | | |
| | | Luke Skywalker (Lightsaber Construction) | Return of the Jedi deleted scene | | | |
| | | Anakin Skywalker | The Clone Wars | | | |
| | | Darth Vader | A New Hope | | | |
| | | Luke Skywalker (Hoth Outfit) | The Empire Strikes Back | | | |
| | | Aayla Secura | Revenge of the Sith | | | |
| | | Nom Anor | Expanded Universe | | | |
| | | Clone Trooper (501st Legion) | Revenge of the Sith | | | |
| | | Kithaba (Skiff Guard) | Return of the Jedi | | | |
| | | Dr. Evazan (Cantina Patron) | A New Hope | | | |
| | | Wedge Antilles | Return of the Jedi | | | |
| | | Barriss Offee | Attack of the Clones | | | |
| | | Han Solo (Bespin Outfit) | The Empire Strikes Back | | | |
| | | Bom Vimdin (Cantina Patron) | A New Hope | | | |
| | | ARC Trooper Commander | Expanded Universe | | | |
| | | Logray (Ewok Medicine Man) | Return of the Jedi | | | |
| | | Gamorrean Guard | Return of the Jedi | | | |
| | | Rebel Fleet Trooper | A New Hope | | | |
| | | Clone Pilot Odd Ball | Revenge of the Sith | | | |
| | | Grand Moff Tarkin | A New Hope | | | Blaster, Mouse Droid |
| | | Nikto (Skiff Guard) | Return of the Jedi | | | |
| | | Galen Marek (Starkiller) | Expanded Universe | | | |
| | | Shae Vizla | Expanded Universe | | | |

== Exclusive Releases ==
=== Revenge of the Jedi Set ===
San Diego Comic Con 2011 exclusive. 14 characters from "Return of the Jedi" on a card with the original logo for the movie: "Revenge of the Jedi". Figures were packaged in a flat circular Death Star package. 6 of the figures were new releases to the Vintage Collection (the Han in Trenchcoat figure being a Vintage Collection rerelease of the Saga Collection figure), 7 of the figures were variants due to the new card, and the Rebel Trooper figure was an African American variant of the original. All figures were released as Wave 7 except for Salacious Crumb and Mouse Droid mini card figures which were exclusive to this set (although they were given VC numbers). The Mouse Droid was also released as an accessory with the Grand Moff Tarkin figure.

| Wave | Number | Character | Film/Series | Release date | Description | Accessories |
|---|---|---|---|---|---|---|
| | VC008 | Darth Vader | Revenge of the Jedi | | | |
| | VC009 | Boba Fett | Revenge of the Jedi | | | |
| | VC022 | Admiral Ackbar | Revenge of the Jedi | | | |
| | VC023 | Luke Skywalker Endor Capture | Revenge of the Jedi | | | |
| | VC025 | R2-D2 | Revenge of the Jedi | | | |
| | VC026 | Rebel Commando | Revenge of the Jedi | | African American Variant | |
| | VC027 | Wicket | Revenge of the Jedi | | | |
| | VC041 | Stormtrooper | Revenge of the Jedi | | | |
| | VC062 | Han Solo (in Trench Coat) | Revenge of the Jedi | | | |
| | VC063 | B-Wing Pilot (Keyan Farlander) | Revenge of the Jedi | | | |
| | VC064 | Princess Leia (Slave Outfit) | Revenge of the Jedi | | | |
| | VC065 | Tie Fighter Pilot | Revenge of the Jedi | | | |
| | VC066 | Salacious Crumb | Revenge of the Jedi | | Mini Card, Comic Con Exclusive | |
| | VC067 | Mouse Droid | Revenge of the Jedi | | Mini Card, Comic Con Exclusive | |

=== Carbonite Chamber Pack ===
San Diego Comic Con 2012 exclusive. 6 Figures (1 from each movie of the Star Wars series) in a pack surrounding the Jar Jar Binks in Carbonite figure. The 6 figures were released on a never before seen card style—the so-called Kenner 'Lost Line' packaging—that was apparently considered for the original series release in 1978. The "Jar Jar Binks (in Carbonite)" figure appeared on a standard 'vintage collection' style card (with the Phantom Menace logo on it). All six regular figures were also released at retail on regular vintage style cards as wave 14. The Jar Jar Binks in Carbonite was never released in stores, nor assigned a "VC" number.

| Wave | Number | Character | Film/Series | Release date | Description | Accessories |
|---|---|---|---|---|---|---|
| | | Jar Jar Binks (in carbonite) | The Phantom Menace | | | |
| | | Jar Jar Binks | Star Wars | | | |
| | | Clone Trooper Lieutenant | Star Wars | | | |
| | | Shock Trooper | Star Wars | | | |
| | | Sandtrooper | Star Wars | | | |
| | | Princess Leia (Bespin Outfit) | Star Wars | | | |
| | | Darth Vader | Star Wars | | Engulfed in Lightning | |
