= Sea Wees =

Kenner dolls

The original Sandy Sea Wee doll

Sea Wees are dolls first released by the Kenner toy company in 1979.

In the form of colorful, hard plastic mermaids with acrylic fiber hair, the first Sea Wees were named Sandy (blonde), Coral (redhead) and Shelly (brunette). Each doll was sold individually and came with a lily pad-shaped sponge and a comb.

Later Sea Wees versions added coordinating babies (infant mermaids with sculpted hats instead of hair) and small pets, a clamshell carry case, a lagoon playset, and eventually a wider range of named mermaids with varied hair colors.

The original toys are now sold as collectibles, and there is a more recent series of Sea Wees dolls sold by Kenner.
