= Starting Lineup (toy line) =

Brand of sports action figures

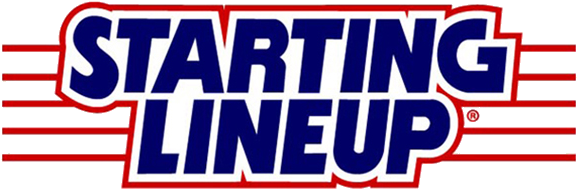
- Type: Sports action figure
- Invented by: Pat McInally
- Company: Kenner (1988–1991); Hasbro (1991–2001)
- Country: United States
- Availability: 1988–2001
- Materials: Plastic
- Features: Sports players

Starting Lineup is a brand of sports action figures originally produced from 1988 to 2001, first by Kenner and later by Hasbro. They were conceived by Pat McInally, himself a former professional American football player with the Cincinnati Bengals. The figures became very popular, and eventually included sports stars from baseball, football, basketball, ice hockey; and, to a lesser extent, auto racing, boxing, track & field, ice skating, association football, and golf. In the late 2010s, the figures made a comeback as a promotional item at several sporting events.

McInally, who graduated cum laude from Harvard University and is the only NFL player with a verified perfect score on the Wonderlic test, came up with the idea during a visit to a toy store. He noticed that there were many figurines available of the likes of G.I. Joe, but none depicting famous athletes, whom McInally considered to be just as recognizable to children. Today, the figures are collector items, with prices per figure sometimes ranging in the hundreds.

A typical figure stands about 4 inches (10 cm) tall, but the brand at times launched various special series that can be much larger including a 14" NBA line and came with a sports card of the respective athlete.

== Initial releases ==
Kenner debuted the Starting Lineup figures in 1988 by releasing a 132-player MLB set, a 137-player NFL set, and an 85-player NBA set. Each MLB team had at least four players in the set except for the Canadian teams of Montreal and Toronto, which had only one player each because Kenner was unsure of the set's appeal in Canada. The New York Mets had the most players in the set with seven. Kenner distributed the players to stores by geographical region, so it was very difficult to complete the collection or find players from out-of-market teams.

== Continued success and decline ==
While there was always at least one annual set featuring single-packed figures for baseball, basketball, football and hockey, there were many other specialty products such as dual-packed figure sets, team sets, one-on-one scene type sets and much more. In 1989 Kenner introduced the Baseball Greats dual-packed figures, featuring such past Hall of Famers as Mickey Mantle with Joe DiMaggio, and Reggie Jackson with Don Drysdale. Basketball, football and hockey would later get their own dual-packed sets in the late 1990s.

1989 also saw Kenner releasing many other specialty and sometimes one-time only products like the AFC and NFC offensive and defensive helmet sets, 9-figure baseball team sets, baseball, basketball and football one-on-one action sequences featuring two players from different teams, and even a Headliner set which featured a superstar player displayed on a base with a miniature newspaper front page cover touting the accomplishment of that particular player.

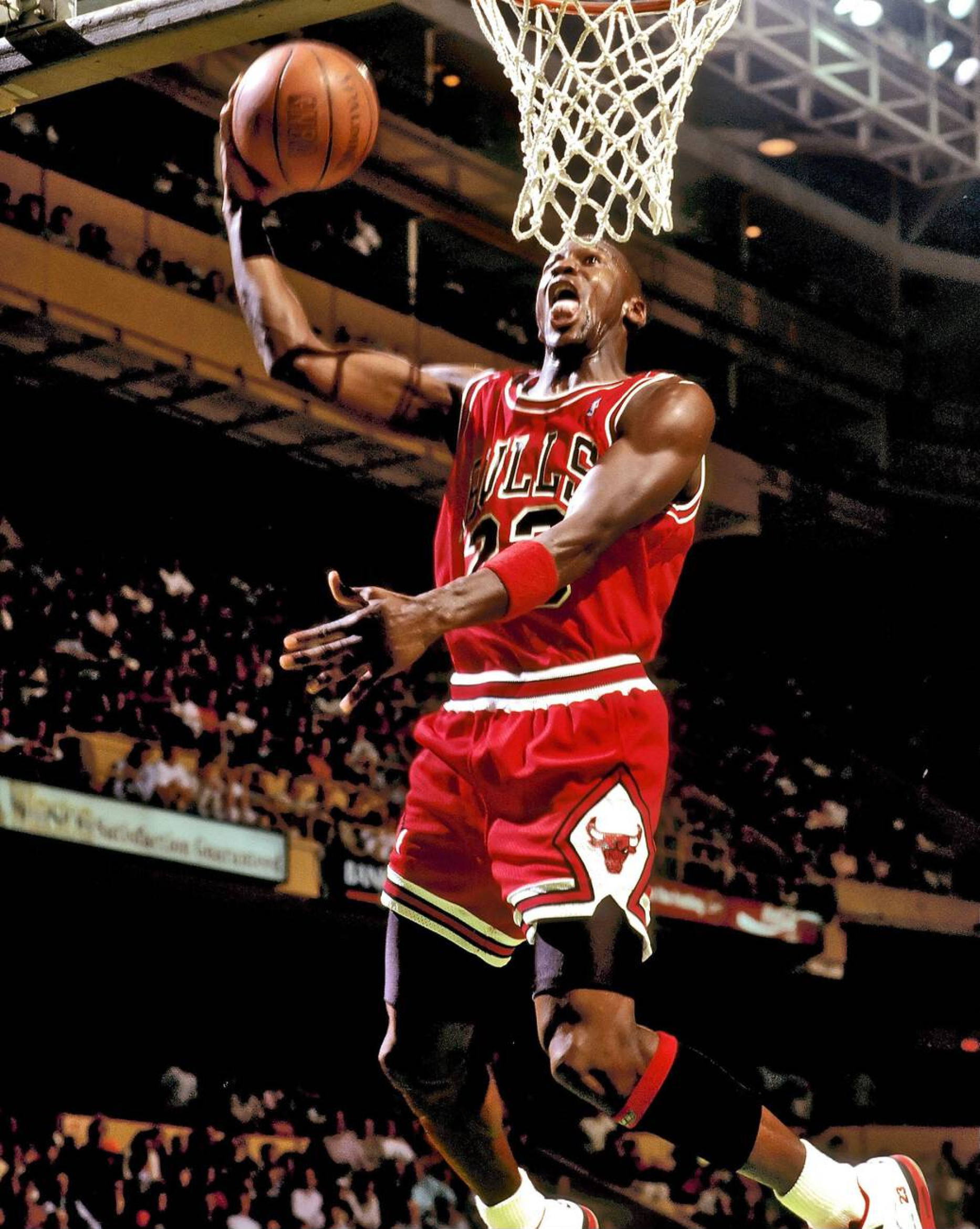
Michael Jordan was one of the athletes featured on the Starting Lineup basketball series

1989 was also the year Kenner released the NBA Slam Dunk series, which featured players like Michael Jordan and Larry Bird dunking on a small basketball hoop, complete with backboard and hardwood floor. Kenner would also offer exclusive product lines through their four-issue annual Starting Lineup Collector's Club Newsletter, in which consumers could order such unique items as a Nolan Ryan Freeze Frame product in 1995, featuring the pitcher in four different team uniforms with each figure depicting a different position in his windup and delivery of a pitch. Other specialty product lines included 12" doll-like figures in 1997 and the once popular Stadium Stars baseball set featuring larger figurines placed over a base which was a replica of that player's respective stadium; Roger Clemens standing over Fenway Park is one example of such a figure.

Boxing figurines were released as part of their "Timeless Legends" series during the late 1990s, featuring Joe Louis, Rocky Marciano, Sugar Ray Leonard and Muhammad Ali as well as a dual pack with enlarged figures of Ali and Joe Frazier. Other important sports figures also had figures of them released as part of that series, including Mary Lou Retton and Pelé.

After the release of the initial sets, Kenner and Hasbro, who purchased Kenner in 1991, found it difficult to produce large sets because almost all notable players had already been included in the 1988 releases.

== Comeback ==
Legacy One, Inc. obtained the trademark after Hasbro let it lapse. As of January 2017, Match-Up, a Florida company, is licensed to produce Starting Lineup figures as stadium giveaways. In 2016, three professional sports teams gave away special edition Starting Lineup figures. On October 30, the Tampa Bay Buccaneers released a figure of Jameis Winston. In addition, on November 25, the San Jose Sharks released a figure of Joe Pavelski, and on December 23, the Charlotte Hornets released a figure of Nicolas Batum. In the years since, over two dozen special edition giveaways have occurred across MLB, the NBA, and the NHL.

== See also ==
- Celebrity doll
