= Kutol Products Company =

American cleaning products manufacturer

Kutol Products Company, Inc. is a privately held manufacturer of commercial skin care products founded in 1912 and headquartered in Cincinnati, Ohio. Kutol specializes in hand soaps, hand sanitizers, hair and body washes, heavy duty and industrial hand cleaners, specialty skin care products and dispensing systems. Kutol products are distributed throughout the world but mainly in the United States and Canada.

== History ==
Kutol (pronounced cut-all) began business as a manufacturer of wallpaper cleaner. This pliable, putty-like flour-based material was the foundation for Play-Doh, created in 1933. In 1950, the Rainbow Crafts Company was created to make and sell Play-Doh, and Kutol continued to focus on its core business of powdered hand cleaners. Since that time, Kutol has transitioned to focus on liquid and foaming hand soaps, hand sanitizers and dispensing systems. Health Guard is Kutol’s general purpose hand care line while Kutol Pro is the industrial, heavy-duty option. Kutol also specializes in private label and contract soap manufacturing for more tailored hand care programs.

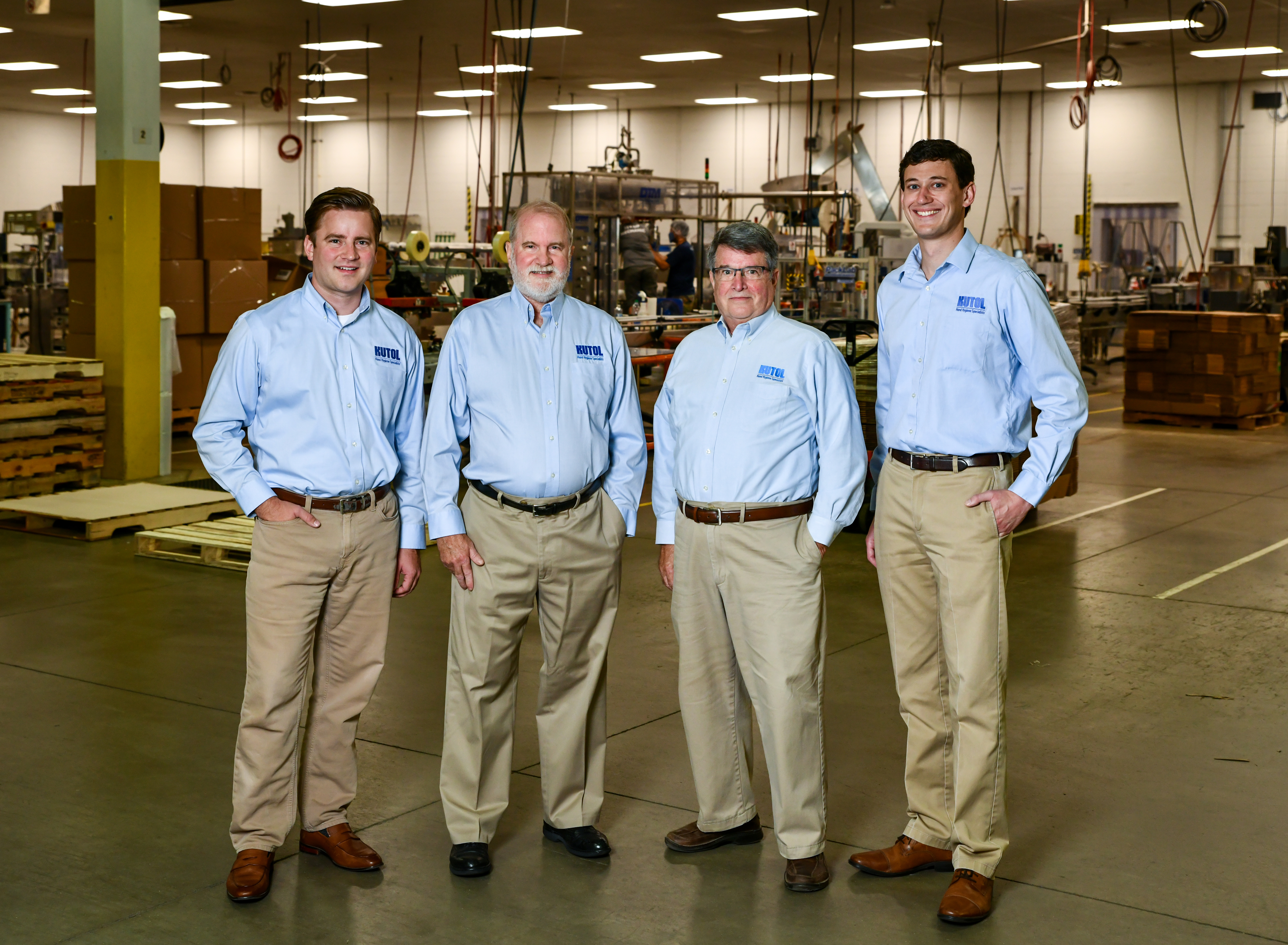
Third and fourth generation of Kutol team.

Family owned and operated for more than 100 years, third and fourth generation family members currently manage the company. In 2011, Kutol built a LEED Silver-certified manufacturing facility in Sharonville, Ohio. The company follows the most stringent government guidelines and are in compliance with Current Good Manufacturing Practices.

Today Kutol manufactures hygiene products for industries including education, healthcare, food service, industrial, automotive, hospitality and transportation.
