= Fat Brain Toys =

American Toy Company

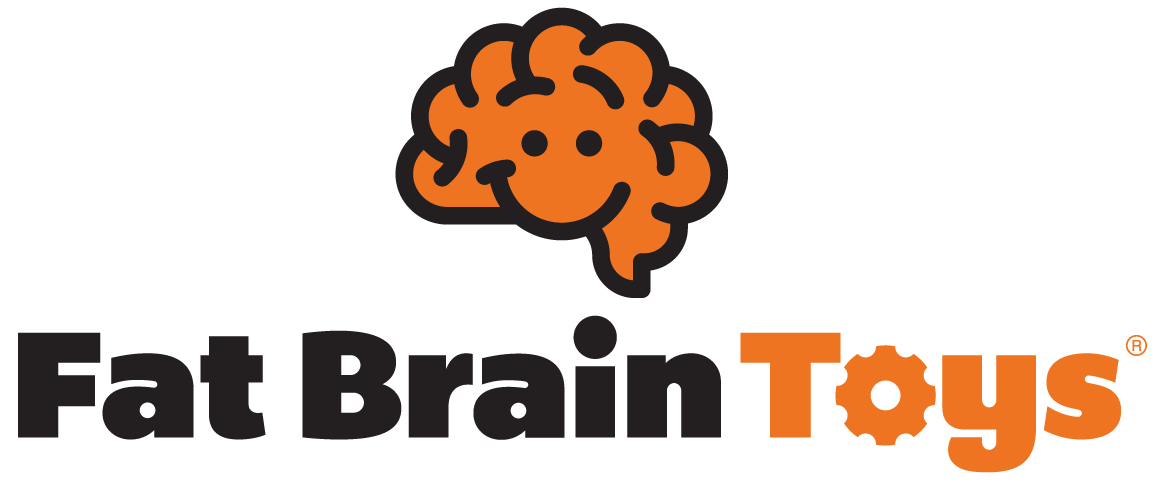
- Type: Private
- Industry: Toys
- Founded: 2002
- Founder: Mark and Karen Carson
- Headquarters: Elkhorn, Nebraska, United States
- Website: www.fatbraintoys.com

Fat Brain Toys is a United States manufacturer and retailer of educational toys and games. The company was founded by husband and wife, Mark and Karen Carson, from the basement of their home in 2002. It is headquartered in Elkhorn, Nebraska with a distribution center located in nearby Omaha, Nebraska. The company operates two retail storefronts, one in Omaha, Nebraska and another in Overland Park, Kansas. The company specializes in building toys, brainteasers, and multi-player games. They collect various statistics on their consumers and toys, such as the ages of recipients and a 'Toy Value Index' which they display at the lower end of the respective product's page. As of 2014, the company had 46 full-time employees. The staff expands to approximately 300 people during the holiday season.

== Dimpl Series ==
Fat Brain Toys' Dimpl series includes several sensory fidget toys originally designed for infants. The product line gained popularity due to the popping fidget toy trend on TikTok, leading to its adoption by older age groups, particularly the miniature Simpl Dimpl keychain. Each toy in the series features at least one silicone bubble embedded in a plastic frame that creates a popping sound when pressed. The product lineup includes the original five-bubble Dimpl, the two-bubble Simpl Dimpl, and the ten-bubble Dimpl Digits.

== Awards ==
- 2014 American Specialty Toy Retailers Association - Best Toys for Kids Award
- 2013 Spielwarenmesse ToyAward
- 2012 Internet Retailer Magazine Hot 100
