= Kenner Star Wars action figures =

American toy line

- The Star Wars "Early Bird Certificate" package shown in a 1977 Kenner catalog
- Type: action figures
- Company: Kenner Products
- Country: USA
- Availability: 1978–1985
- Materials: plastic

The Kenner Star Wars action figures were produced by the toy company Kenner, which between 1978 and 1985 released 96 action figures, multiple vehicles, and playsets based on the Star Wars franchise. From a line of over 100 unique toys, a total of more than 300 million units were sold during their original run. Kenner resumed producing Star Wars action figures in 1995.

The initial line is highly valuable amongst collectors. In 2024, a prototype Boba Fett was auctioned for US$1.342 million, becoming the most expensive toy ever sold. The toys have also been bootlegged and scalped.

== Description ==
The Star Wars action figures are plastic, typically up to 3 3/4 inches (9.5 cm) tall with five points of rotation at the neck and limbs (though many individual figures vary from this), and peg holes in the feet to stand them on displays. Most figures were packaged individually, attached to paperboard "cardbacks" in a plastic blister. Alongside about 96 action figures produced between 1977 and 1985, various vehicles and playsets were also released.

== History ==
The license for Star Wars action figures was offered in 1976 to the Mego Corporation, the leading company for action figures in the 1970s. Mego rejected the offer, and the license was subsequently picked up by Kenner, a division of General Mills' Fun Group subsidiary. Star Wars (1977) was the first film to successfully license toys to consumers on a large scale. Kenner's action figure sales, along with dozens of similar licensing deals given to companies that sold everything from clothing to dog food, ultimately allowed George Lucas to finance the next two movie chapters of his saga: The Empire Strikes Back (1980) and Return of the Jedi (1983).

Although the original Star Wars film had been released in May 1977, Kenner was not ready to satisfy demand for their film-based toys. The company had only begun to seriously consider the property after a meeting in New York in February 1977. Their licensing deal with Lucas and Fox was not signed until mid-year, leaving insufficient time to produce stock for the Christmas market. Instead, they sold an "Early Bird Certificate Package", which included a certificate that could be mailed to Kenner and redeemed for four Star Wars action figures. The first four figures to be distributed were Luke Skywalker, Princess Leia, Chewbacca, and R2-D2. The box also teased the next eight figures (C-3PO, Darth Vader, Stormtrooper, Obi-Wan Kenobi, Han Solo, Jawa, Tusken Raider, and Star Destroyer Commander) and contained a diorama display stand, stickers, and a Star Wars fan club membership card.

In 1978, accompanying vehicles and playsets began to be released. Amongst the first released were the J. C. Penney catalog–exclusive remote-activated landspeeder and the Sears catalog–exclusive Death Star Space Station and Cantina adventure sets (the latter debuting four new figures, including Greedo). Additionally, the first large creature, a Dewback, was released. Four other figures (Luke in X-wing gear and three droids) were released later in 1978, bringing the total to 20. High demand for the toy line resulted in shortages. By the end of the year, sales reached 40 million units, generating a revenue of US$100 million.

In anticipation of the release of The Empire Strikes Back, Kenner offered a mail-in promotion in which four proofs of purchase could be redeemed for a new figure, Boba Fett. This figure was originally intended to feature a backpack with a missile that could be launched, but this was abandoned due to safety concerns. (Note: This followed the death of a three-year-old boy who choked on a similar missile from a Mattel Battlestar Galactica toy.) Sales in 1979 again topped $100 million. Kenner continued to introduce waves of figures from the sequels, and by 1984, some 80 had been released overall.

In 1985, 15 figures were released with collectors coins under the banner "The Power of the Force". Additionally, two lines of figures were released to complement the contemporaneous animated series Star Wars: Droids and Ewoks. The former included ten new figures (plus two repackagings) and the latter included six. By mid-1985, the demand for Star Wars merchandise had slowed, and Kenner discontinued production of its action figures.

=== Modern line ===
In 1995, Kenner (now under Hasbro's ownership) launched a modern line of Star Wars figures, again using the "Power of the Force" banner. The first figure was repurposed from an existing toy mold, with other characters derived from that one. The initial male design featured muscular proportions, with even the first new Princess Leia adapting a wide stance to require the least underlying alteration. The initial lightsaber length was deemed too long and adjusted to the character proportions in 1996. Some vehicles reused the previously existing molds with superficial changes.

The line was used to promote the multimedia project Shadows of the Empire in 1996, the "Special Edition" of the original Star Wars trilogy in 1997, and other spin-off media (namely Dark Forces, the Thrawn trilogy, and Dark Empire). Toys for the prequel and sequel trilogies were released under the Hasbro brand. To promote Episode I: The Phantom Menace, figures released around 1999 were paired with chips with quotes from the film, requiring a reader to play. Additionally, figures were created to promote more recent Star Wars television series.

== Variations ==
Variations exist for most of the different figures. These can range from major resculpts and differences in accessories supplied with the figures to differences in paint detailing: for instance, in hair color, or differences in sculpting materials. Some variations command higher prices in the collector market due to relative scarcity.

The Sears-exclusive Cantina adventure playset contains four action figures. The Snaggletooth figure initially wears a blue outfit with silver disco-style boots and long legs. This "Blue Snaggletooth" was subsequently corrected to represent the character as actually featured in the movie, and a resculpted, shorter, barefoot, red-outfitted figure was released. Only the corrected "Red Snaggletooth" was released on blistered cardbacks, which made the "Blue Snaggletooth" more scarce and sought after by collectors.

During the Empire Strikes Back run, the R2-D2 figure was altered to include an extendable "sensorscope". Similarly, C-3PO was resculpted with removable limbs. In 1985, R2-D2 was again altered to feature a pop-up lightsaber. Both the removable-limb C-3PO and pop-up-lightsaber R2-D2 were offered with alternate paint detailing in the Droids range.

The lightsaber-wielding characters originally featured a double-telescoping saber mechanism. This was changed to a single-telescoping mechanism early in 1978. As the Luke Skywalker figure was part of the Early Bird promotion, proportionately more of these were released with the double-telescoping mechanism, while double-telescoping Ben (Obi-Wan) Kenobi and Darth Vader figures are comparatively rarer and sought after.

Early Han Solo figures have a somewhat diminutive head sculpt. This was later replaced by a larger sculpt.

Early Jawa figures were released with a vinyl cape similar to that of Obi-Wan Kenobi. This was later changed to a fabric cloak.

=== Cardbacks ===
From the period through 1977 to mid-1984, figures sold individually in stores were issued on cardbacks that corresponded to the most current movie, with figures being sold on cardbacks with Star Wars designs through to 1980, then on Empire Strikes Back cards through to 1983, followed by Return of the Jedi cards and "Power of the Force" cards in 1984.

As the number of figures in the range increased, the cardback design would be altered accordingly. Thus, the earliest figures released for direct sale in shops were issued on a cardback, the rear of which illustrated the then full range of 12 figures, known to collectors as a 12-back. The 12-back was supplanted by the 20-back, and subsequently by the 21-back, the 31-back, the 32-back, the 41-back, the 45-back, the 47-back, the 48-back, the 65-back, the 77-back, the 79-back, and the 92-back.

Variations exist for each of the cardback fronts. These range from differences in promotional offer stickers applied to the card to differences in the photograph illustrating the character. Similarly, variations exist for all of the cardback rear designs, with the exceptions of the 47-back and 92-back designs, which were only available in a single version.

As of 2012, 57 different front-rear cardback combinations were known. This does not include figures released through overseas companies or the Droids or Ewoks ranges.

== Non-US licenses ==
Star Wars figures were sold in a number of countries outside the US. These figures were usually sold through other companies, many of which were also subsidiaries of General Mills.

In the UK, the Star Wars license was held by Palitoy, which imported the figures and packaged them in the UK on Palitoy-branded cardbacks. Analogous arrangements were in place in Spain with the company PBP/Poch, in France with Meccano, in the Benelux countries with Clipper, in Germany with Parker, in Italy with Harbert, and in Scandinavia with Brio/Playmix.

In Japan, the line was first controlled by the company Takara, then by Popy, and finally by Tsukuda. The license was acquired in Australia by Toltoys, while in Mexico it was held by Lili Ledy, and in Brazil by Glasslite.

In certain cases, figures produced by the non-US-licensed companies are substantially different from those sold by Kenner. Takara, for example, sold resculpted versions of Darth Vader, Stormtrooper, and C-3PO. Lili Ledy used different paint detailing and different fabric accessories. Glasslite figures were molded using slightly different, glossier plastic and used different paint detailing. The Glasslite Droids range was also notable in that it included a character, "Vlix", that had not been issued in other countries. The Vlix figure was prototyped for the Kenner line but never made it past the stage of being mocked-up on a card.

Towards the end of the Star Wars figure run, figures for the European market were issued on trilogo cardbacks, so-called because the cardback front had three logos in English, French, and Spanish. The cardback rear was a unique design showing 70 characters. Trilogos are in somewhat greater demand amongst collectors due to overstock having been bought by the US company Kay Bee. The character "Yak Face", which had only previously been issued in Canada and Australia, was also available on the Trilogo card.

== Reproductions ==
As the figures were intended, and generally used, as toys, accessories such as weapons and cloaks were often lost, or stickers were damaged. Once a collectors' market had been established, some collectors started replacing accessories with reproduction items. Such items are considered undesirable to some collectors, particularly where figure variations centering on differences in accessories have led to a price premium, such as with the double telescoping lightsabers or the vinyl-caped Jawas. Some hard-to-obtain figures have also been reproduced, sometimes as counterfeit originals. Notable examples include the rocket-firing Boba Fett prototype and unpainted prototypes of regular figures.

Taking advantage of consumer demand for the toys, some regional manufacturers released unlicensed bootlegs. These vary in materials, casting method, and quality. For example, the UZAY line of figures produced by the Turkish manufacturer SB Products is of a high standard and was often cast in unconventional colors with little regard to authenticity. The quirkiness of these figures, with their often bizarre psychedelic cardbacks, has led to demand from collectors, and they frequently demand a high price premium.

Kenner itself repurposed a Return of the Jedi figure and playset, along with an Ewoks vehicle, for its 1991 Robin Hood: Prince of Thieves line.

== Legacy ==
Kenner's success with the Star Wars line motivated creators of other action-adventure movies to market their own action figure lines.

Two of Steven Spielberg's 1982 films, Poltergeist and E.T. the Extra-Terrestrial, feature scenes showing Star Wars action figures.

The figures are discussed in the 2014 direct-to-video documentary film, Plastic Galaxy: The Story of Star Wars Toys, episode one of the 2017 Netflix documentary series The Toys That Made Us, and a 2022 episode of the History series The Toys That Built America.

The Imperial Troop Transporter, one of Kenner's original Star Wars vehicle designs, was featured in a 2015 episode of the animated series Star Wars Rebels and in an episode of the live-action series The Mandalorian. A 2020 episode of the animated series Star Wars: The Clone Wars features a group of three aliens wearing outfits matching original Kenner toys.

Since at least the 2020s, rare variations of figures have been auctioned for high prices. In 2024, a prototype Boba Fett sold at auction for $1.342 million, becoming the most expensive toy ever sold. Collectors have been critical of companies or organizations that purchase the products solely for resale at a profit ("scalping").

== See also ==
- Star Wars: The Vintage Collection
