= Play-Doh =

Children's modeling compound

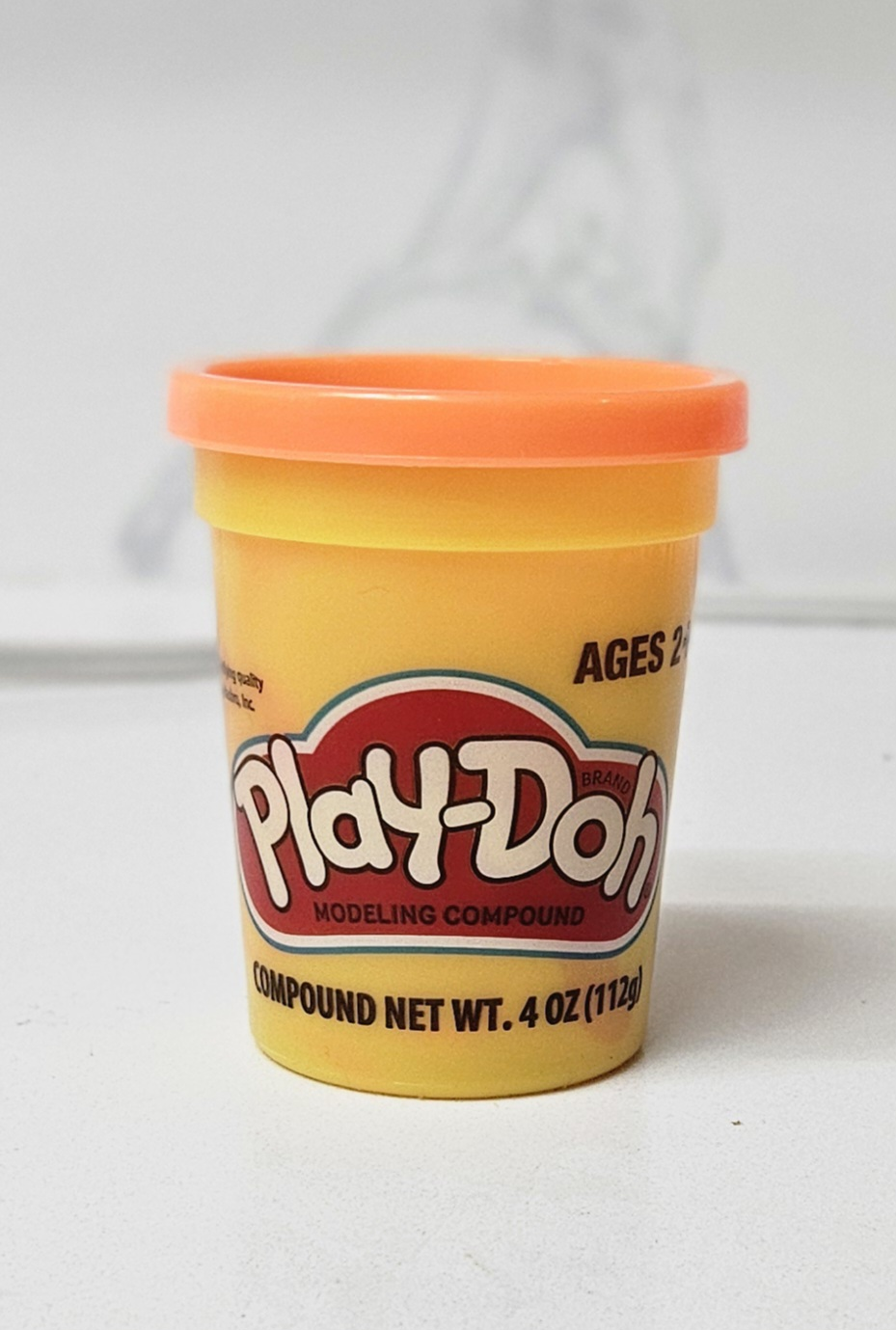
- A container of orange Play-Doh
- Type: Modelling clay
- Invented by: Kay Zufall; Brian Joseph McVicker; Bill Rhodenbaugh
- Company: Kutol (1955); Rainbow Crafts (1956–1971); Kenner (1971–1991); Hasbro (since 1991)
- Country: United States
- Age range: 2+
- Availability: 1956–present
- Slogan: Fun to play with, not to eat

Play-Doh, also known as Play-Dough, is an American brand of modeling compound marketed for young children to make arts and crafts projects. The product was first manufactured in Cincinnati, Ohio, as a wallpaper cleaner in the 1930s. Play-Doh was then reworked and marketed to Cincinnati schools in the mid-1950s. Play-Doh was demonstrated at an educational convention in 1956 and prominent department stores opened retail accounts.

Advertisements promoting Play-Doh on influential children's television shows in 1957 furthered the product's sales. Since its launch on the toy market in the mid-1950s, Play-Doh has generated a considerable amount of ancillary merchandise such as the Fun Factory.

== History ==
=== Origin ===
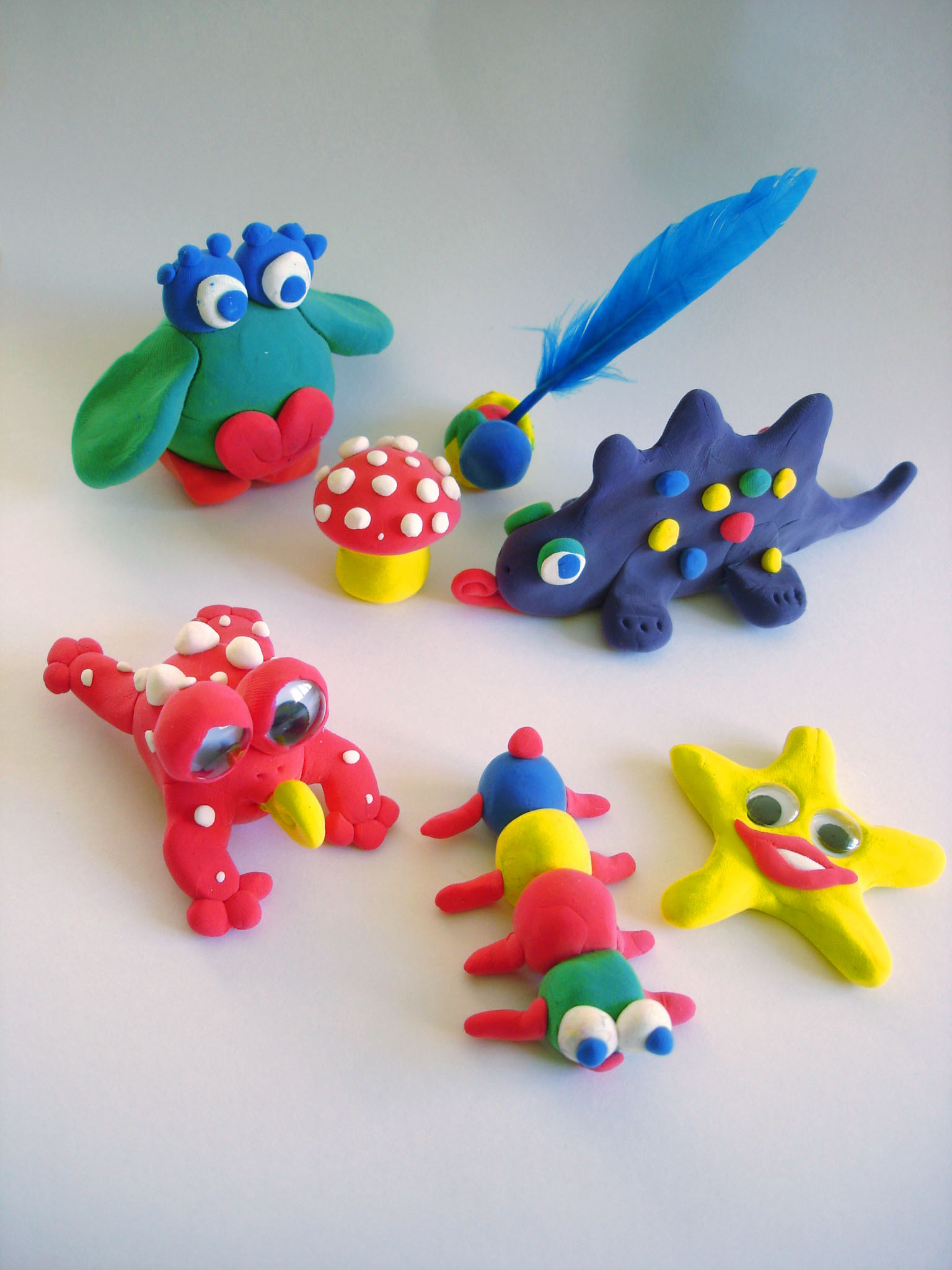
Objects made out of Play-Doh

The non-toxic, non-staining, reusable modeling compound that came to be known as "Play-Doh" was a pliable, putty-like substance concocted by Noah McVicker of Cincinnati-based soap manufacturer Kutol Products. It was devised at the request of Kroger Grocery, which wanted a product that could clean coal residue from wallpaper from coal fired homes.

Following World War II, the demand for wallpaper cleaning putty shrank substantially. The increasing popularity of natural gas in heating applications and corresponding reduction of coal use resulted in a decrease of indoor soot build-up in homes and businesses. The introduction of washable vinyl-based wallpaper further rendered many such specialized cleaning products unnecessary. McVicker's nephew, Joe McVicker, joined Kutol with the remit to save the company from bankruptcy. Joe McVicker was the brother-in-law of nursery school teacher Kay Zufall, who had seen a newspaper article about making art projects with the wallpaper cleaning putty. Her students enjoyed it, and she persuaded Noah McVicker (who also sold the putty) and Joe McVicker to manufacture it as a child’s toy. Zufall and her husband came up with the name Play-Doh; Joe McVicker and his uncle Noah had wanted to call it Rainbow Modeling Compound.

=== Launch ===
Joe McVicker took Play-Doh to an educational convention for manufacturers of school supplies, and Woodward & Lothrop, a department store in Washington, DC began selling the compound. In 1956, the McVickers formed the Rainbow Crafts Company to make and sell Play-Doh. Also in 1956, a three-pack of 7-ounce cans was added to the product line, and, after in-store demonstrations, Macy's of New York and Marshall Field's of Chicago opened retail accounts. In 1957, chemist Dr. Tien Liu reduced Play-Doh's salt content (thus allowing models to dry without losing their color), and Play-Doh ads were telecast on Captain Kangaroo, Ding Dong School, and Romper Room. In 1958, Play-Doh's sales reached nearly $3 million. ($33.6 million as of November 2025)

=== Subsequent developments ===
In 1964, Play-Doh was exported to Britain, France, and Italy. By 1965, Rainbow Crafts received a patent for Play-Doh. Also in 1965, the food company General Mills bought Rainbow Crafts for $3 million. In 1967, General Mills bought Kenner Products. In 1971, Rainbow Crafts and Kenner merged, and, in 1987, the Tonka Corporation bought the two. In the 1980s, its cardboard can (with a rust-prone metal bottom) was replaced with a more cost effective plastic container. In 1991, Hasbro acquired Tonka and became the owner of Play-Doh, putting the compound under its Playskool brand, and continues to manufacture the product today. In 1996, gold and silver were added to Play-Doh's palette to celebrate its 40th anniversary.

More than two billion cans of Play-Doh were sold between 1955 and 2005, and, in 2005, Play-Doh was being sold in 75 countries at 95 million cans a year. In the United States, more than 6,000 stores carry Play-Doh.

Play-Doh was inducted into the National Toy Hall of Fame at The Strong in Rochester, New York, in 1998.

In 2003, the Toy Industry Association placed Play-Doh into its "Century of Toys List", a roll call of the 100 most memorable and most creative toys of the twentieth century.

In late 2014, the company offered to replace the "Play-Doh Cake Mountain" playset's extruder tool, for free, after receiving complaints about the tool's "phallic shape".

=== Scent ===
To mark Play-Doh's fiftieth anniversary, Demeter Fragrance Library created a limited-edition fragrance inspired by Play-Doh's distinctive odor for "highly-creative people, who seek a whimsical scent reminiscent of their childhood."

In 2018, Hasbro registered Play-Doh's signature scent with the United States Patent and Trademark Office. It's described as a "combination of a sweet, slightly musky, vanilla-like fragrance, with slight overtones of cherry, and the natural smell of a salted, wheat-based dough."

=== Mascots ===
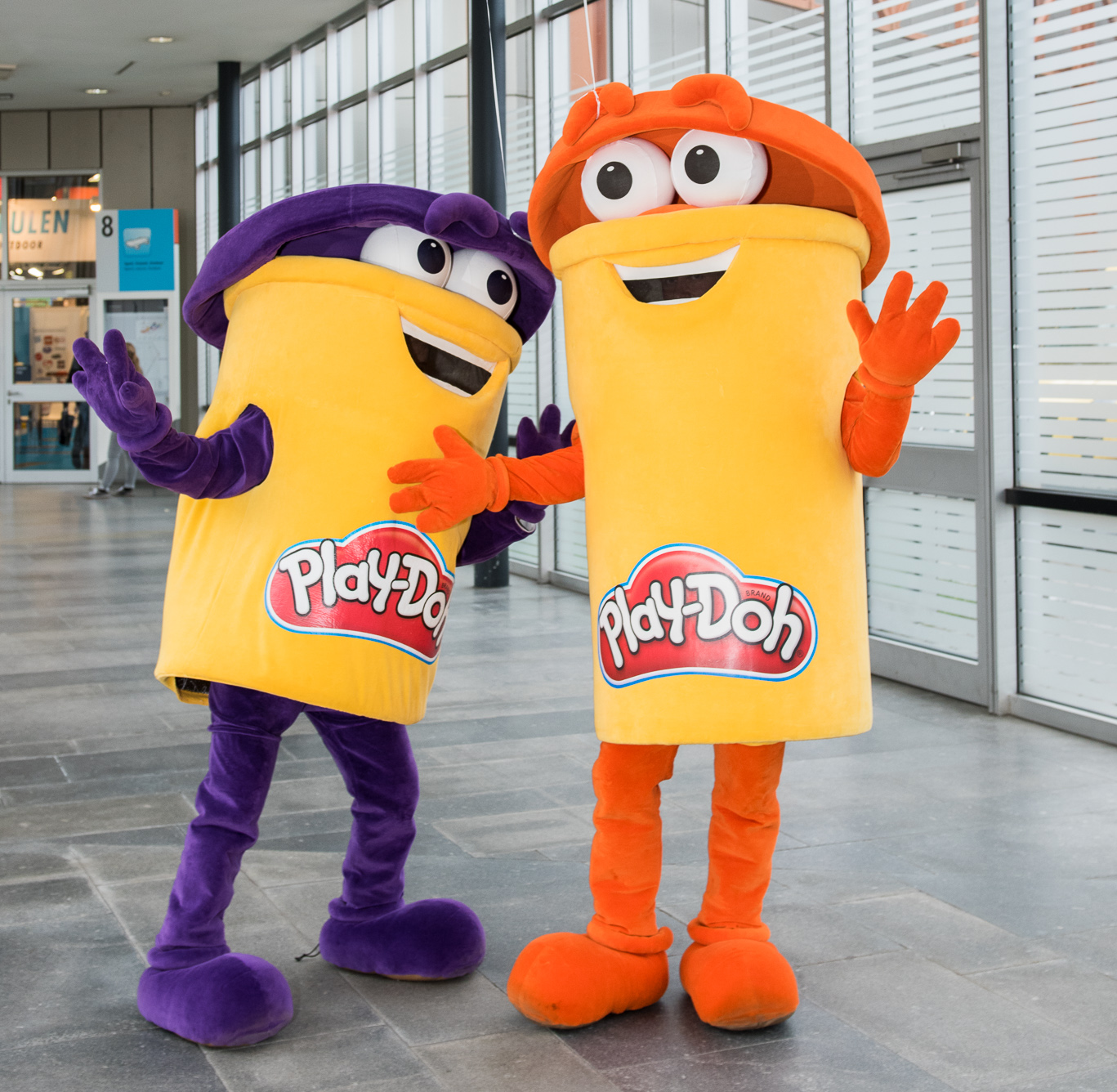
Doh-Dohs at the Nuremberg International Toy Fair in 2016

Play-Doh packaging was briefly illustrated with children in the mid-1950s, but replaced by the Play-Doh Pixie, an elf mascot which, in 1960, was superseded by Play-Doh Pete, a smock and beret-wearing cartoonish boy. By 1992, Play Doh Pete's beret was recolored in blue, and his eyes were given a more human look. Later in 2000, Play-Doh Pete's beret was replaced with a baseball cap. Play-Doh Pete later retired and was removed in 2003, lasting for 42 years. Since 2012, the Doh-Dohs are the mascots.

== Manufacturing ==
From its launch in 1955 to 2004, the manufacturing of Play-Doh took place in the United States. In 2004, Hasbro ended the production of Play-Doh in East Longmeadow, Massachusetts, shifting production to China and Turkey. After a 14-year hiatus, some Play-Doh manufacturing was returned to East Longmeadow in 2018 as part of a partnership with Cartamundi of Belgium.

== Ingredients ==
Play-Doh's current manufacturer, Hasbro, says the compound is primarily a mixture of water, salt, and flour, while its 2004 United States patent indicates it is composed of water, a starch-based binder, a retrogradation inhibitor, salt, lubricant, surfactant, preservative, hardener, humectant, fragrance, and color.

A petroleum additive gives the compound a smooth feel, and borax prevents mold from developing. Play-Doh contains wheat and may cause allergic reactions in people who are allergic to wheat gluten. It is not intended to be eaten.

== Related merchandise ==
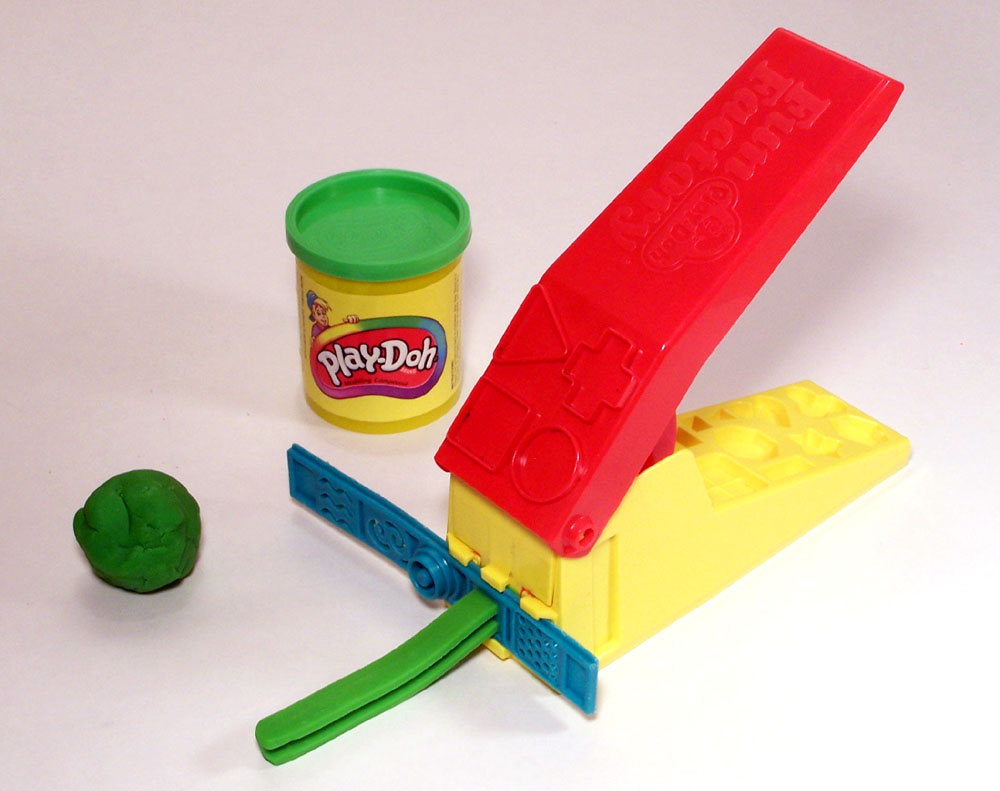
Play-Doh Fun Factory

In 1960, the Play-Doh Fun Factory (a toy press that extrudes the compound in various shapes) was invented by Bob Boggild and Bill Dale. The Play-Doh Fuzzy Pumper Barber & Beauty Shop of 1977 and Mop Top Hair Shop of 1986 featured a figurine whose extruded "hair" could be styled.

In 1996, an educational software CD-ROM game, Play-Doh Creations was released.

In 2003, the Play-Doh Creativity Table was sold. Play-Doh related merchandise introduced during the 2007 anniversary year included the Play-Doh Birthday Bucket, the Play-Doh Fifty Colors Pack, the Fuzzy Pumper Crazy Cuts (a reworking of the 1977 Fuzzy Pumper Barber & Beauty Shop), and the Play-Doh Creativity Center. In 2013, "Play-Doh Plus" was introduced. It is lighter, more pliable, and softer than regular Play-Doh.

== Other media ==
=== Film ===
On April 2, 2015, 20th Century Fox announced work on a film adaptation with Hasbro Studios along with its subsidiary company Allspark Pictures and Chernin Entertainment producing, Jason Micallef writing, and Paul Feig directing from his production company Feigco. The film was eventually cancelled and rejected after the acquisition of Fox's parent company 21st Century Fox by The Walt Disney Company.

On March 17, 2022, it was announced that a new animated film adaptation is in development at Entertainment One and its parent company Hasbro, Emily V. Gordon writing and Jon M. Chu producing and possibly directing.

=== Series ===
A game show adaptation produced by Hasbro's former entertainment division Entertainment One started streaming on Amazon Freevee (then known as IMDb TV), called Play-Doh Squished. Initially a holiday special on December 10, 2021, it became a full-length series on November 11, 2022. The competition show is hosted by Sarah Hyland.

== See also ==
- Milliput
- Plasticine
- Play-Doh, sculpture by Jeff Koons
- Sculpey
