= Savage Mondo Blitzers =

Toy line

Savage Mondo Blitzers were a line of miniature collectible toy figures on skateboards by Kenner. They were produced in 1991 and sold in the United States, Italy, Greece, and Argentina. They were about an inch tall. They came in sets of four skaters per pack, each set had a different gang, and each skater his own personality.

== Gangs ==
There were 9 gangs released in the USA including a deluxe pack:

- Damaged and Deadly Gang - Blood Hockey, Mr. Mutator Head, Chop Chop, Head Alert
- The Dudes of Disaster - Bad Fart, Blade Invader, Killer Kommando, Twin Geeks
- The Butt Kickers - Snot Shot, Secret Weapon, Gun Runner, Cleat Meat
- The Chunk Blowers - Tyrannosaurus Ax, Loaded Diaper, Direct Hit, Big Hans
- The Skull Crunchers - Fat Ax, Pork Chopper, Bad to the Bone, Roach Kill
- Concrete Breakfast Gang - Metal Head, Shark Bait, Knight to Dismember, and Barf Bucket
- Scars and Spikes Gang - Kiss My Bat, Aping Wound, Lug Nut, Eye Pus
- The Sewer Surfers - Numb Chuck, Robozooka, Bad Audience, Butterfly Gone Bad
- Crazy 8 with 'Lightning Launcher' - Destruction Worker, Lawn Disorder, Chow Hound, General Mayhem, Armed & Dangerous, Fist Fight, Shishke Bob, and Jack Hammer.

Although pictures of the following gangs appeared on the back of the packaging, they were never released in the USA:

- Brains Not Included - Wedgyson, Fly'd Out, Gutter Brawl, Salad Bartender
- Puke Shooters Gang - Hex Bolt, Gas Attack, Leg Up, Bad Apple

These figures are very rare and can only be found in the Italian and Greek versions of the toys.
