= Kenner Products =

American toy company

- Type: Subsidiary
- Industry: Toys
- Founded: 1946; 80 years ago
- Founders: Albert Steiner; Phillip Steiner; Joseph L. Steiner
- Defunct: 2000; 26 years ago
- Fate: Closed, properties and brand name sold. Product lines merged into and still used as a label by Hasbro since 2010
- Successor: Hasbro
- Headquarters: Cincinnati, Ohio
- Products: Action figures, die-cast model vehicles
- Parent: Independent (1946–1967); General Mills (1967–1985); Kenner Parker Toys, Inc. (1985–1987); Tonka (1987–1991); Hasbro (1991–2000)

Kenner Products, commonly known as Kenner, is an American toy brand and a former toy company owned by Hasbro. Founded in 1946, Kenner produced the first Star Wars action figures, merchandise based on other popular franchises including Jurassic Park and Batman, and die cast models.

The company underwent numerous acquisitions and mergers throughout its lifetime, starting with by General Mills in 1967, which eventually spun it off alongside Parker Brothers in 1985 as Kenner Parker Toys, Inc. In 1987, Kenner Parker was acquired by Tonka, which in turn was purchased by Hasbro in 1991. Hasbro closed and merged Kenner's offices and products in 2000. The brand was reintroduced by Hasbro in 2010 with the release of Star Wars: The Vintage Collection.

== History ==
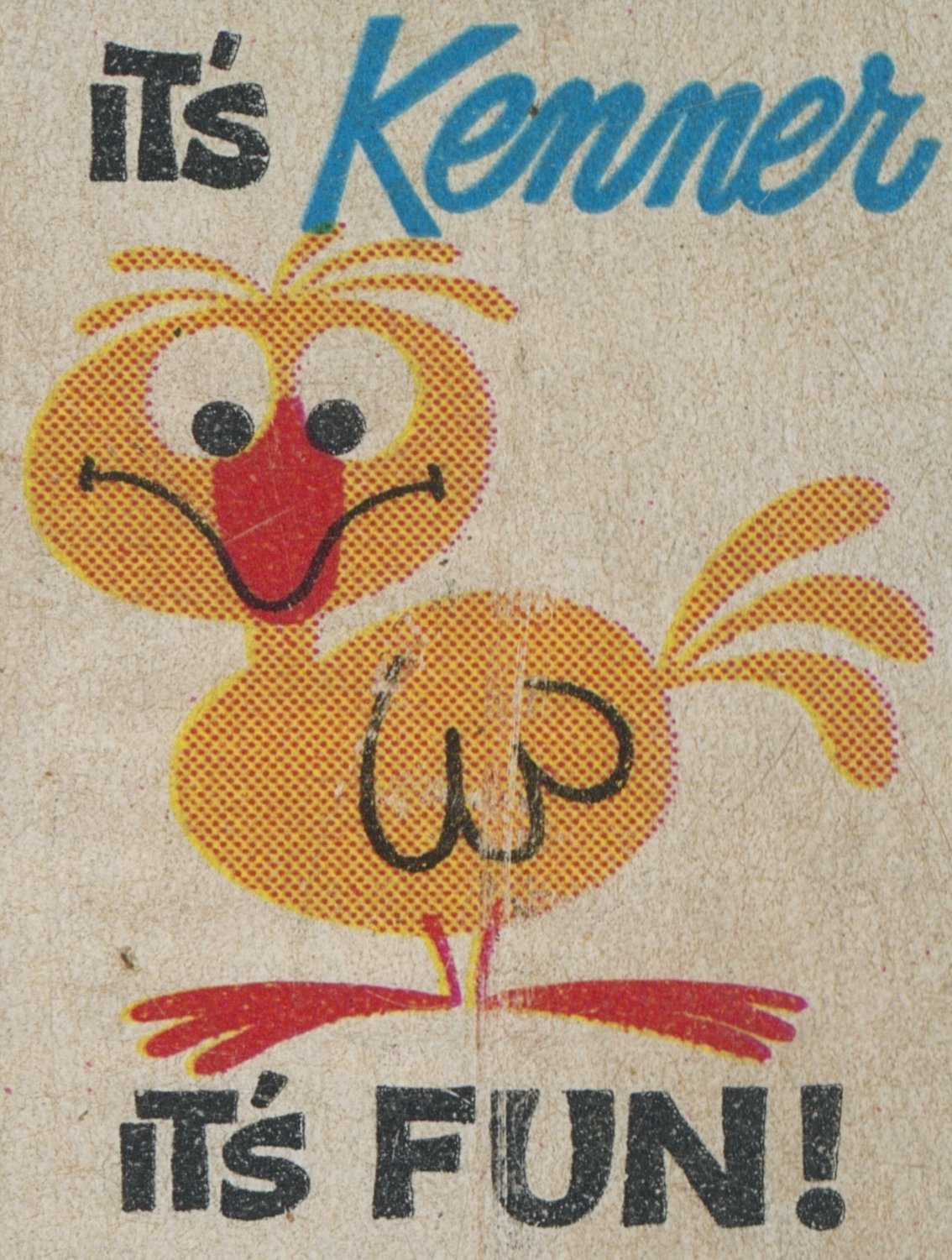
The Kenner Gooney bird in 1962

Kenner was founded in 1946 in Cincinnati, Ohio, by brothers Albert, Philip and Joseph L. Steiner. The company was named after the street where the original corporate offices were located, just north of Cincinnati Union Terminal. It was a pioneer in the use of television advertisement for the marketing of merchandise across the United States, beginning in 1958.

The 1968 ad by Jim Henson.

In 1962, Kenner introduced its corporate mascot, the Kenner Gooney Bird, and its company slogan "It's Kenner! It's fun!" for advertising. (Note: The slogan of was trademarked. However, this Trademark had been considered dead since Sep. 15, 1985.) In 1968, the company commissioned Muppets creator Jim Henson to create an Easy-Bake Oven ad, which featured the Kenner Gooney Bird in puppet form. Later in 1969, the puppet would be repurposed as the Sesame Street character Little Bird. The Bird was phased out by 1974.

The company was purchased by the food company General Mills in 1967. In 1971, General Mills merged its Rainbow Crafts division into Kenner, bringing Play-Doh into the Kenner product line. In 1985, General Mills would spin-off both its Kenner and Parker Brothers toy divisions to form Kenner Parker Toys, Inc. The following year Kenner Parker sold off its Lionel Trains division.

Kenner Parker was acquired by Tonka in 1987. Under Tonka management, Kenner Products was reconstituted as a division. Tonka (including Kenner) was purchased by the toy company Hasbro in mid-1991. Hasbro closed the Cincinnati offices of Kenner in 2000, and Kenner's product lines were merged into Hasbro's.

== Products and product lines ==
One of Kenner's original products was the "Bubble-Matic," a toy gun that blew bubbles. An "updated" version was available at least as late as the mid-1960s. Kenner introduced its popular Girder and Panel building sets construction toy in 1957, the Give-a-Show projector in 1959, the Easy-Bake Oven in 1963, the Electric Mold Master also in 1963, the Spirograph drawing toy in 1966, and the Starting Lineup sports action figure collectible line in 1988.

Kenner Products obtained the rights to produce Star Wars action figures and playsets based on the Star Wars trilogy from 1976 through 1985. After Kenner acquired the license to produce Star Wars toys when the Mego Corporation rejected it in 1976, Kenner popularized the 3.75 inch action figure that became an industry standard. Kenner also produced toys related to the popular 1970s TV series The Six Million Dollar Man and the 1979 sci-fi movie Alien. In 1981, Kenner belatedly entered the diecast toy car market, with a short-lived range called Fast 111's. The 1980s also saw the release of the "Fashion Star Fillies" line of model horses, a product discontinued by the end of the decade.

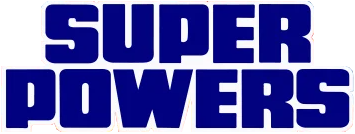
text portion of the logo of the Super Powers Collection, the superhero action figure line released in 1984

One of Kenner's most highly acclaimed lines was the Super Powers Collection based on DC Comics superheroes. Produced from 1984 to 1986, the figures were closely modeled on the character depictions in the company style guide. Distinguishing the line, each character performed an "action." For example, when Superman's legs were squeezed, he would punch. Kenner commissioned certain comics professionals to design figures of characters they created or co-created, including Jack Kirby for his New Gods characters and George Pérez for Cyborg. For its work on Super Powers, DC named Kenner as one of the honorees in the DC Comics 50th anniversary publication Fifty Who Made DC Great in 1985.

One of the more popular action figure lines in the late 1980s was Kenner's The Real Ghostbusters, based on the 1986–1991 animated series adaptation of the 1984 feature film Ghostbusters. The toy line debuted the same year as the cartoon and continued production through most of its run. Although the initial releases accurately resembled The Real Ghostbusters cartoon designs, unlike Super Powers, the toy line very soon stopped attempting to be faithful to the existing source material. Instead, new, original costumes, weapons and ghost characters were designed by Kenner, many of them centered on unique action features, similar to those popularized by Mattel's competing Masters of the Universe toy line as well as Kenner's earlier Super Powers toy line.

This idea of basing a toy line on well-known characters but then coming up with original designs that were not based on any published storylines represented a major shift in the design approach to action figure toy lines at the time. In previous years, one major approach to producing toy lines was to base them closely on popular, well-known characters from properties like Star Wars, Marvel Comics, or DC Comics. The other major approach was for the toy companies to invent their own original characters and then help produce comic books and cartoons that promoted those exact designs (e.g., Hasbro's G.I. Joe and Transformers and Mattel's Masters of the Universe). In a departure from this, Kenner did not have any arrangement to incorporate their new concepts and designs into The Real Ghostbusters cartoons or comic books.

This looser approach to the source material of licensed toy lines continued with Kenner's Dark Knight Collection, launched in 1990 and the first of their numerous lines based on the Batman character. This initial set was created to capitalize on the phenomenal success of the cinematic version of the character, releasing vehicles (such as the Batmobile or Batplane) inspired by the highly successful 1989 film. Kenner also made vehicles from the Batman Forever movie (1995). Later toy lines expanded beyond the movie series and took inspiration from Batman's animated series and comic book incarnations. Kenner went on to develop lines centered on Superman and other DC Comics characters as well. As with The Real Ghostbusters, most of these DC Comics lines incorporated multi-colored costumes, weapons and action features which were not based directly on any existing storylines, although the character names and likenesses were typically drawn from the source material. This design approach to the DC Comics toy lines was continued to a large extent by Mattel when they took over the DC Comics license and produced lines based on the movies Batman Begins, The Dark Knight and Superman Returns as well as the Justice League cartoons. Hasbro, Kenner's eventual buyer, has taken a similar approach with some of their action figure lines, most notably on their 2010 3.75" Spider-Man action figure line as well as some of their 2009 G.I. Joe: The Rise of Cobra product.

In 1998, the Jurassic Park: Chaos Effect line was released but sales were less than expected. The Night Hunter series, the second line of toys based on Chaos Effect, was planned for 1999, but was cancelled due to poor sales. The Jurassic Park series became more of an annoyance to Hasbro rather than a trademark brand name. Due to this, the overproduction of Star Wars: Episode I – The Phantom Menace toys, coupled with low sales, forced Hasbro to downsize by getting rid of the Kenner department in Cincinnati. 100 people were transferred and 420 were laid off. Among these 420 was the Jurassic Park design team (which also designed Batman among other toy lines), who had just started the very early concepts for Jurassic Park III. Because of this, Hasbro assigned the toys from Jurassic Park III to their Star Wars design team, who scaled the humans to be in size with Star Wars figures and made the style of the toys similar to the ones from Star Wars: Episode II – Attack of the Clones.

In 2010, Hasbro began releasing modern Star Wars action figures with packaging reminiscent of the original Kenner 1978–1984 Star Wars product line. Star Wars: The Vintage Collection is composed of new highly pose-able figures, with screen-accurate likenesses. Hasbro had done this twice before, with the 2004 "vintage" Original Trilogy Collection and the 2006–2007 "vintage" Saga Collection but this is the first time that their Star Wars line was entirely dedicated to replica Kenner carded figures.

=== List of product lines ===
- Alien
- Always Sisters
- Baby Alive
- Banjo-Matic
- Batman & Robin
- Batman Forever
- Batman Returns
- Batman: The Animated Series
- Batman Total Justice
- Battle Brawlers
- Beast Machines: Transformers
- Beast Wars: Transformers
- Beat the Buzz
- Beetlejuice
- Big Burger Grill
- Bill and Ted's Excellent Adventures
- The Bionic Woman
- Blythe
- Bone Age
- Bride Surprise
- Bubbl-Matic
- Building Blasters
- Building Boulders, Flintstones
- Butch and Sundance: The Early Days
- Capitol Critters
- Captain Planet and the Planeteers
- Care Bears
- Care Bear Cousins
- Cassette Movie Projector
- Centurions
- Chuck Norris: Karate Kommandos
- Close 'n Play
- Congo
- Daddy Saddle
- Darci Covergirl
- Dragonheart
- Duke
- Dusty
- Easy Bake Oven
- Fairy Winkles
- Fashion Star Fillies
- Fast 111's
- Finger Pops
- Fluppy Dogs
- G.I. Joe Extreme
- Gargoyles
- Girder and Panel building sets
- Give-A-Show Projector
- Glamour Gals
- Gun That Shoots Around the Corner
- Hardy Boys, The
- Home Workshop, Motorized
- Hugga Bunch
- Hugo
- Ice Bird, with five flavor packets
- Jurassic Park
- Knight Rider
- Li'l Loggers
- Littlest Pet Shop
- Mega Force
- Megabug Gladiators
- M.A.S.K.
- Milky, the Marvelous Milking Cow
- Movie Viewer
- Mummies Alive!
- My Magic Genie
- Pistol That Shoots Around the Corner
- Play-Doh
- Play 'n Play Back Organ
- Police Academy
- Power Sub
- Predator
- Raiders of the Lost Ark
- The Real Ghostbusters
- Red Line
- Robin Hood: Prince of Thieves
- RoboCop: The Animated Series
- Robotman & Stellar
- Rose Petal Place
- Rotodraw
- Run Joe Run
- Savage Mondo Blitzers
- Say It! Play It!
- Scuba Squad
- Sea Wees
- The Shadow
- Shadow Strikers
- SilverHawks
- Steel
- Technozoids (Zoids)
- Sip-Along Sam
- The Six Million Dollar Man
- Sky Commanders
- Small Soldiers
- Spirograph
- SSP (Super Sonic Power) Vehicles and Smash Up Derby
- Star Wars
- Starting Lineup
- Strawberry Shortcake
- Stretch Armstrong
- Super Powers Collection
- Superman: The Animated Series
- Swamp Thing
- Terminator 2: Judgment Day
- TTP (Turbo Tower of Power) Vehicles
- Turn-A-Tune
- VR Troopers
- Vor-Tech
- Waterworld
- Wish World Kids
- XRC
- Zippity Speedway
- Zoom-Loom Automatic Weaving Machine

== See also ==
- Super Powers Collection
