= Skyline (construction set) =

Line of model construction sets

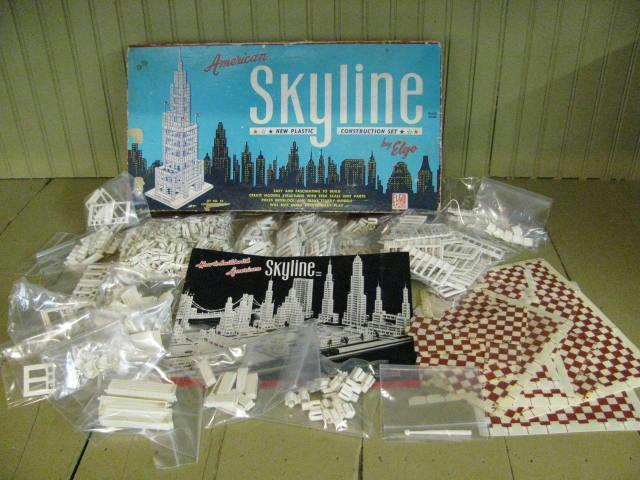
- Skyline box set showing contents and instruction booklet
- Publishers: Elgo Plastics/Halsam Products
- Skills: Model building, construction

American Skyline was a construction set sold in the late 1950s and early 1960s by Elgo Plastics/Halsam Products Company from Chicago, Illinois. With an American Skyline set, its owner could piece together models of high-rise city buildings.

== Set contents ==
The set consisted of a collection of three different types of plastic parts; column segments, vertical panels (which included windows and doors), and floor panels. Doors were simple plastic pieces and did not open. They came in single, double, and 4-door designs. Windows were single, double, triple, and a 7-window design as well as a unique bay style with single and double large open windows (which can also be used as room door ways to divide rooms if one wished).

There were also base blocks, step blocks and rails which were used in the foundations of the structures being constructed. The step blocks were also used in other parts of the structures. The pieces all tend to be fairly durable except for the columns, which tend to have sides broken off with many years of use. The roofing and floor bases were basic thin plastic sheets with a checker board motif in white and brown to one side and blank white on the other. The column segments interlocked to form stacks. Each such stack would present four tracks running the length of the stack. The vertical panel pieces had edges that could slide into the tracks. Panels slid into adjacent tracks in the same column would be at right-angles to each other. The floor/roof panels had corners cut in such a way that each corner could be held in place between two column segments. Also included were flag poles to attach flags to, flags were found (printed) on the back page of the instruction booklet to the sets. Attachment was cutting them and folding them then simply pasting them to the poles.

== Set versions ==
Sets were sold in six different versions. The sets came in six different sizes. They originally came in flat boxes, then Cardboard canisters with a metal top. Note: (Set No. 96 seems to have been issued in a flat box only). These sets other than how they were boxed were identical. Elgo/Halsam issued a 3rd version of these sets, the other difference was that this last version came with colored plastic windows (in amber, blue and green) and had more total pieces than the two earlier versions (they did have fewer roof/floor pieces however). American Skyline Construction Sets came with the following number of parts:

Set No. 91 - 229 Pieces Set No. 92 - 476 Pieces Set No. 93 - 723 Pieces Set No. 94 - 970 Pieces Set No. 95 - 1217 Pieces Set No. 96 - 1904 Pieces

The set counts were identical for both the Flat Box Sets and the Second Generation Canister Sets

Sets with Colored Windows Added:

Set No. 91 - 245 Pieces, actually 249 Pieces Set No. 92 - 510 Pieces, actually 516 Pieces Set No. 93 - 800 Pieces, actually 801 Pieces Set No. 94 - 1060 Pieces, actually 1068 Pieces Set No. 95 - 1330 Pieces, actually 1335 Pieces Set No. 96 - 2110 Pieces, actually 2118 Pieces

The set counts were verified with actual Skyline Sets.

== Discontinuation ==
When Halsam became a part of Playskool the sets were discontinued, possibly because PlaySkool specializes in toys designed for toddler use, and these have small pieces that would have presented a choking hazard to toddlers.

== Gallery ==
A typical single door from the American Skyline building sets, Part No. D1

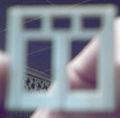
The double doors from the American Skyline building sets, Part No. D2

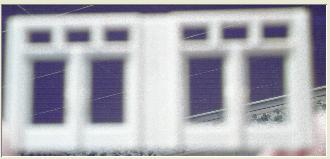
4 doors from the American Skyline building sets, Part No. D3

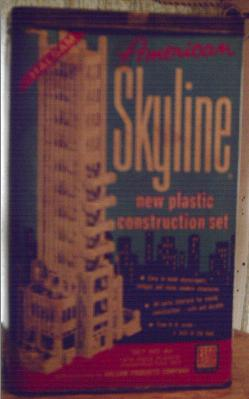
Set no. 92 as packaged in the cardboard canister form

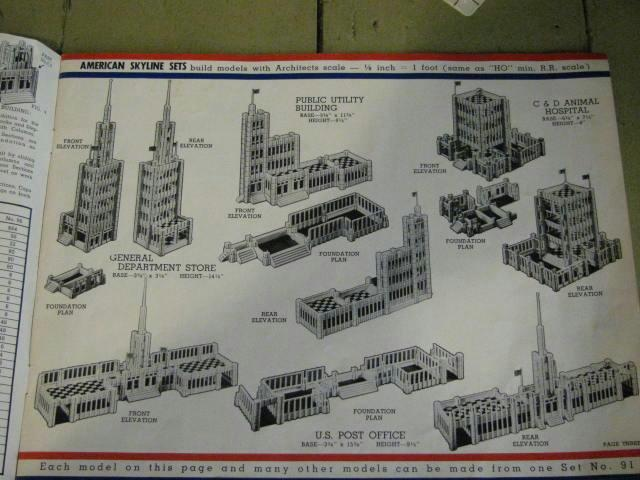
The instruction booklet to these sets contained plans for several buildings and bridges one could build and gave set numbers from which one would need to do so. There is also a Second Version of the Instruction Manual with the cover in Color, the main difference is that the Commerce Building, (Built with Set No. 95) is a totally different looking building.
