= Rainbow Crafts =

American toy company

Rainbow Crafts, Inc.
- Trade name: Rainbow Crafts
- Company type: Subsidiary
- Industry: Toys
- Founded: 1956; 70 years ago
- Founder: Noah McVicker, Joseph McVicker
- Defunct: 1971; 55 years ago
- Fate: Merged with Kenner in 1971
- Successor: Kenner
- Headquarters: United States
- Products: Play-Doh
- Parent: Independent (1956–1965); General Mills (1965–1971)

Rainbow Crafts, Inc. (traded as Rainbow Crafts) is a former toy manufacturing company created and operated by Noah McVicker and his nephew Joseph McVicker as a subsidiary of the midwestern soap company, Kutol Products. The company manufactured Play-Doh, a modeling compound for children. Rainbow Crafts operated under the McVickers from 1956 until 1965 when it was sold to General Mills with all rights to Play-Doh. In 1971, Rainbow Crafts and Kenner merged.

Hasbro currently manufactures Play-Doh.
