= Undercut (molding) =

A simple example of molding an external undercut

In molding, an undercut is an indentation or protrusion in a shape that will prevent its withdrawal from a one-piece mold.

Undercuts on molded parts are features that prevent the part from being directly ejected from an injection molding machine. They are categorized into internal and external undercuts, where external undercuts are on the exterior of the part and interior undercuts are on the inside of the part. Undercuts can still be molded, but require a side action or side pull. This is an extra part of the mold that moves separately from the two halves. These can increase the cost of the molded part due to an added 15 to 30% cost of the mold itself and added complexity of the molding machine.

If the size of the undercut is small enough and the material is flexible enough a side action is not always required. In these cases the undercut is stripped or snapped out of the mold. When this is done usually a stripping plate or ring is used instead of ejector pins so that the part is not damaged. This technique can be used on internal and external undercuts.
