= The Adult Legion =

Comic story arc featuring the Legion of Super-Heroes

- Publisher: DC Comics
- Publication date: March – April 1967
- Genre: Science fiction, superhero
- Title(s): Adventure Comics #354-355
- Main character(s): Legion of Super-Heroes; Superman; Legion of Super-Villains

Creative team
- Writer: Jim Shooter
- Penciller: Curt Swan
- Inker: George Klein
- Editor: Mort Weisinger

"The Adult Legion" is a comic book story arc published by American company DC Comics, presented in Adventure Comics #354-355 (March–April 1967). It was written by Jim Shooter, pencilled by Curt Swan, and inked by George Klein. The story arc features one of Superman's encounters with the Legion of Super-Heroes as adults, and foreshadows several plot twists which occur in the years that follow.

The story arc includes the first reference to Brin Londo as Timber Wolf, and the first references to Chemical King, Reflecto and Shadow Lass (who appears as Shadow Woman).

== Plot ==
Superman is contacted by the Legion of Super-Heroes, the 30th-century team which he joined years earlier as Superboy. Upon reaching Legion Headquarters, he walks through a hall of statues honoring deceased Legionnaires, including Ferro Lad, Chemical King, Reflecto, and Shadow Woman. In another hall devoted to married Legionnaires, he observes statues of several wedded members: Shrinking Violet and Ord Qelu (the former Duplicate Boy), Saturn Woman and Lightning Man, Light Lady and Timber Wolf, and Night Woman and Cosmic Man. After Brainiac 5 gives Superman a tour of Legion HQ, he becomes reacquainted with Ultra Man, Phantom Woman, Polar Man, and Element Man, as well as the former Colossal Boy, Matter-Eater Lad, Star Boy, Dream Girl, Bouncing Boy, and Duo Damsel.

The team is perplexed when their headquarters is breached, with everything in the lab, arsenal, and spaceport hangar destroyed. After two more break-ins, the saboteur is captured and revealed as Douglas Nolan, Ferro Lad’s twin brother, who shares his ability to transform into living iron. The Legion soon comes to realize that he was acting under the mental control of Saturn Queen, and that the Legion of Super-Villains has been attacking them from afar.

Superman returns to the 20th century, after which the Super-Villains kidnap Brainiac 5. The Legionnaires avoid a series of traps, but are captured by Echo, Saturn Queen, Lightning Lord, Beauty Blaze and Cosmic King. Unexpectedly, two armored figures arrive, defeating the villains and freeing the Legionnaires. They soon reveal themselves to be descendants of Lex Luthor and Mr. Mxyzptlk, two of Superman’s greatest enemies. The Legionnaires vote them onto the team unanimously.

== Aftermath ==
For years, subsequent Legion storylines were consistent with the depiction of the future in "The Adult Legion". Bouncing Boy and Duo Damsel are married, soon followed by Lightning Lad and Saturn Girl. Lone Wolf becomes Timber Wolf and joins the Legion, and Chemical King dies preventing World War VII. It is eventually revealed that the story takes place in an alternate universe, leaving its events out of continuity.
