= Comet Queen =

DC Comics character

- Comet Queen's first appearance in Legion of Super-Heroes (vol. 2) #304.

Publication information
- Publisher: DC Comics
- First appearance: Legion of Super-Heroes (vol. 2) #304 (October 1983)
- Created by: Keith Giffen (plot, pencils); Paul Levitz (script); Larry Mahlstedt (inks)

In-story information
- Alter ego: Grava
- Species: Unspecified
- Place of origin: Colony Extal (Quaal III)
- Team affiliations: Legion of Super-Heroes
- Abilities: Flight; Enhanced durability Space survivability Gas generation

Comet Queen is a superhero appearing in media published by DC Comics, primarily as a member of the Legion of Super-Heroes in the 30th and 31st centuries prior to Zero Hour.

== Publication history ==
Comet Queen first appeared in Legion of Super-Heroes #304 (October 1983), and was created by Keith Giffen, Paul Levitz, and Larry Mahlstedt.

== Fictional character biography ==
Grava of the Earth colony Extal is a long-time fan of Star Boy, and wants desperately to become a member of the Legion. She enters the tail of a passing comet, gaining flaming hair and the ability to survive in the vacuum of space and generate comet-like gases.

In Legion of Super-Heroes #11 (1985), reserve Legionnaire Bouncing Boy describes to his comrade Superboy how he met Comet Queen while he was on a goodwill tour to the planet Quaal III. Comet Queen ambushed him and introduced herself, declaring him her very own "personal Legionnaire". Bouncing Boy rejected Comet Queen's initial bid for membership on the grounds that she has not proven herself. Later, he finds out from several hotel guests, including Grava's father, that the girl has gone off in a fit of dejection to search for Quaal III's lava seas to seek out the planet's mythical natives as a "super-feat" to prove herself worthy. Bouncing Boy and Comet Queen end up in a near-death situation until they work together to escape. Comet Queen is accepted into the Legion Academy training program, where she is taught by Bouncing Boy and his wife Duo Damsel. It is here that she becomes friends with other Legion hopefuls, including Laurel Kent and Shadow Kid.

Comet Queen later joins a short-lived incarnation of the Legion of Substitute Heroes, formed by Cosmic Boy to deal with special missions. Other members of this group include Night Girl, Karate Kid, and her former teachers Bouncing Boy and Duo Damsel.

Following the Zero Hour: Crisis in Time! reboot, Comet Queen makes minor appearances in Legionnaires, Final Crisis: Legion of 3 Worlds, and the 2021 one-shot Tis the Season to Be Freezin', where she dates Polar Boy.

== Powers and abilities ==
After exposure to a comet's tail, Comet Queen gained the ability to fly, even in the vacuum of space. She can also emit a variety of noxious gases that can be used to stun an opponent.
