= The Great Darkness Saga =

1982 DC Comics story arc featuring the Legion of Super-Heroes

- Cover of Legion of Super-Heroes: The Great Darkness Saga TPB (1989), art by Keith Giffen
- Publisher: DC Comics
- Publication date: August – December 1982
- Genre: Science fiction, superhero
- Title(s): Legion of Super-Heroes vol. 2, #287, #290–294, Annual #1 and #3, Booster Gold #32
- Main character(s): Legion of Super-Heroes; Darkseid

Creative team
- Writer(s): Paul Levitz; Keith Giffen
- Penciller(s): Keith Giffen; Larry Mahlstedt
- Inker: Larry Mahlstedt
- The Legion of Super-Heroes: The Great Darkness Saga HC: ISBN 978-1-4012-2961-0
- The Legion of Super-Heroes: The Great Darkness Saga TPB: ISBN 0930289439

"The Great Darkness Saga" is a five-issue American comic book story arc featuring the Legion of Super-Heroes. It was written by Paul Levitz, with art by Keith Giffen and Larry Mahlstedt. Published by DC Comics in 1982, the arc first appears in Legion of Super-Heroes vol. 2, #290–294. It is notable for featuring appearances by virtually every living past and present Legionnaire as of 1982, (Note: Legion members Matter-Eater Lad, Shrinking Violet, and Tyroc, reserve members Kid Psycho and Insect Queen, and honorary members Rond Vidar, Pete Ross, and Elastic Lad do not appear in "The Great Darkness Saga".) as well as most of the team's 30th-century allies, including the Legion of Substitute Heroes, the Wanderers, the Heroes of Lallor, and the 20th-century Kryptonian refugee Dev-Em. The heroes battle a powerful being shrouded in darkness who is ultimately revealed to be Darkseid, the ancient ruler of Apokolips.

== Plot ==
In the 30th century, the Legion of Super-Heroes investigate attacks on the Museum of the Mystic Arts and the Tower of London by a group of thieves, who manage to steal a mystical wand and the sword Excalibur. At his base of operations, the Master absorbs the artifacts' power. One of the thieves is captured and taken back to the Legion's headquarters.

Through genetic testing, Mon-El and Dream Girl determine that the captured Servant is a clone of Lydea Mallor, Shadow Lass' 20th-century ancestor. (Note: The true Lydea Mallor does not make her first appearance until L.E.G.I.O.N. '89 #8 (September 1989).) Meanwhile, on the planet Avalon, the fourth Servant frees Mordru. (Note: Mordru was imprisoned beneath the rubble of his castle in Legion of Super-Heroes (vol. 2) #276 (June 1981).) Just as Mordru is about to destroy the Servant, the Master appears and defeats him. Shortly thereafter, on the prison planet Takron-Galtos, the Legionnaires discover that the Master has drained the abilities of the Time Trapper. (Note: The Time Trapper depicted in this story was an imposter, as later revealed in Legionnaires 3 #1 (February 1986).)

In the midst of the crisis, the Legion holds its long-delayed election, choosing Dream Girl as its new leader. She leads a squad of Legionnaires to Zerox, where they repel an attack by the Master and several Servants. Mon-El confronts the Master directly and recognizes him from events he witnessed while in the Phantom Zone. (Note: The Phantom Zone, a dimension used by the planet Krypton as a prison, was introduced in Adventure Comics #283 (April 1961). Phantom Zone inmates do not age, do not require sustenance to survive, and are able to observe events occurring anywhere in the regular universe.) (Note: In his first appearance in Superboy #89 (June 1961), Mon-El was forced to spend a thousand years in the Phantom Zone to avoid dying from lead poisoning.)

The sorcerers of Zerox cast a spell intended to defend them against the Master, but instead conjure a humanoid baby. Meanwhile, on Earth, Cosmic Boy, Saturn Girl, and Lightning Lad determine that two of the Servants are clones of Superman and one of the Guardians of the Universe. In response, they send out an alarm calling all Legionnaires to duty.

The Legionnaires manage to locate the Master's homeworld. Engaging the Servants in battle, Wildfire destroys the Guardian clone, while Timber Wolf destroys the Superman clone. Brainiac 5 recognizes the Master's homeworld and deduces his identity. Meanwhile, the Master travels to Daxam and remakes it in his image, revealing him to be Darkseid. Darkseid sends the Daxamites to conquer the universe.

Dream Girl sends out a second alarm to all of the Legion's super-powered allies, including Supergirl and the Legion of Substitute Heroes. Throughout United Planets territory, Dev-Em, the Heroes of Lallor, the Wanderers, the Substitute Heroes, and the Legionnaires struggle to hold back the Daxamites.

Meanwhile, the humanoid child rapidly ages into Highfather. He transforms the last remaining Servant into a clone of Orion, who is destined to destroy his father Darkseid. (Note: The prophecy of Darkseid's death at the hands of Orion is first mentioned in Mister Miracle #9 (August 1972).) Before fading away, Highfather summons Superboy and Supergirl to Apokolips, with his power allowing them to maintain their abilities under a red sun. Darkseid destroys the Orion clone and returns Superboy to the 20th century. He becomes preoccupied with battling Supergirl and the other Legionnaires and loses control of the Daxamites, who make their way toward the planet. Realizing that he cannot defeat the Daxamites, Darkseid admits defeat and retreats, taking Apokolips with him to an unknown location.

Months later, Saturn Girl and Lightning Lad have a child, Graym. During the delivery, Darkseid secretly kidnaps the Graym's twin Garridan, transforms him into Validus, and sends him years into the past, where he would encounter the Legion, unrecognized by his parents or anyone else. Darkseid declares that his curse has been fulfilled. (Note: The birth of the twins and the second twin's abduction and transformation into Validus occurs in Legion of Super-Heroes vol. 2, Annual #3 (1984), by Paul Levitz (co-plotter/writer), Keith Giffen (co-plotter/artist), Curt Swan and Romeo Tanghal (artists).)

== Continuity ==
"The Great Darkness Saga" was initially rendered non-canon following Zero Hour: Crisis in Time!, which rebooted the Legion's continuity. The story's events are later restored to continuity, but Validus is depicted as a separate entity from Garridan Ranzz.

== Collected editions ==
The story is collected in the trade paperback Legion of Super-Heroes: The Great Darkness Saga (ISBN 0930289439). First printed in 1989, it includes a 7-page prologue from issue #287 and the epilogue from Annual #3, and a replica of a team poster from the same period. A second printing was released in August 2002.

A hardcover "Deluxe Edition" was published in November 2010 (ISBN 978-1401229610), including issues before and after the main "Saga" (#284–296 and Annual #1), but excluding the epilogue story and poster. The hardcover also includes the script for the first part and character designs by Giffen. DC announced a trade paperback edition shipping February 2013. In September 2024, Legion of Super-Heroes: The Great Darkness Saga ([ISBN 1779527764) graphic novel was released, collecting Legion of Super-Heroes #287, #290-294, and Legion of Super-Heroes Annual #3.

== Reception ==
Gizmodo has stated that the story "made the Legion of Super-Heroes one of the best-selling franchises of the early '80s".
