= Earthwar =

Comic story arc featuring the Legion of Super-Heroes

- Publisher: DC Comics
- Publication date: July – November 1978
- Genre: Science fiction, superhero
- Title(s): Superboy and the Legion of Super-Heroes #241-245
- Main character(s): Legion of Super-Heroes; Khunds; Dominators; Dark Circle; Mordru

Creative team
- Writer: Paul Levitz
- Penciller(s): James Sherman, Joe Staton
- Inker: Bob McLeod
- Editor: Allen Milgrom

"Earthwar" is a comic book story arc that was published by the American company DC Comics, presented in Superboy and the Legion of Super-Heroes #241-245 (July – November 1978). It was written by Paul Levitz, pencilled by James Sherman and Joe Staton, and inked by Bob McLeod. The story arc features the efforts of the Legion of Super-Heroes to halt a massive intergalactic war involving the United Planets, the Khunds, the Dominators, the Dark Circle, and the sorcerer Mordru.

The story arc also features the first appearance of Shvaughn Erin, a long-running supporting character in the various Legion titles.

== Plot ==
United Planets Ambassador Relnic summons Mon-El, Ultra Boy, Wildfire, and Dawnstar to Weber's World to protect a diplomatic conference between the United Planets and the Dominion, while many of their fellow Legionnaires battle the Resource Raiders on and above Earth. The crisis prevents Science Police officer Shvaughn Erin from informing the team that one of its enemies has escaped imprisonment. The Legion prevails over the Raiders, only to discover that they were scouts preceding a Khund invasion of Earth. While the team struggles against the massive invasion fleet, Superboy, Element Lad, Sun Boy, and Colossal Boy take the fight to Khundia (the Khund homeworld), where they learn that the Khund warlord Garlak is being telepathically manipulated by an outside force – which they trace back to Weber's World.

The Legionnaires prevent a pair of assassins from killing the Dominion diplomatic delegation at Weber's World, but it is only one in a series of events seemingly designed to disrupt the peace conference. When Relnic and the Dominators suddenly vanish, the Legionnaires decide to return to Earth. Along the way, they locate a space station and discover the missing Dominators, who inform them that Relnic is a Dark Circle agent. Meanwhile, the Khund fleet penetrates the U.P. defenses and lands on Earth, with both the regular Legion and the Legion of Substitute Heroes unable to stop them. As the Khunds approach Legion Headquarters, the only ones remaining to defend the complex are the four Legionnaires who were forced to retire upon marriage: Lightning Lad, Saturn Girl, Bouncing Boy, and Duo Damsel. (Note: The Legion Constitution once forbade married Legionnaires from remaining on the active roster.) (Note: Lightning Lad and Saturn Girl were married in All-New Collectors' Edition #C-55 (1978), while Bouncing Boy and Duo Damsel were wed in Superboy and the Legion of Super-Heroes #200 (January 1974).) After the four of them defend Legion HQ, Saturn Girl telepathically probes one of the Khund commanders, learning that reinforcements sent by the Dark Circle are approaching the planet. Shvaughn Erin fends off Khund troops at Science Police HQ with the assistance of Karate Kid, who has returned from the 20th century. (Note: Karate Kid's journey into the past is chronicled in the solo series Karate Kid (April 1976 – August 1978) and Kamandi #58 (September 1978).)

At Earth's Presidential Palace, the returning Legionnaires locate their comrades who were captured in battle with the Khunds, but are now being held by members of the Dark Circle. The Circle agents attempt to destroy Earth using a sphere of negative matter. Superboy, Mon-El, Ultra Boy, and Wildfire block most of the negasphere's energy as it is released, but the palace is demolished. Only a handful of Legionnaires are conscious when one of the Circle agents (who had been masquerading as Ambassador Relnic) reveals himself to be the escaped foe that Erin tried to warn the Legion about earlier: the sorcerer Mordru.

Having skillfully manipulated the Resource Raiders, the Khunds, the Dark Circle, and the events on Weber's World, Mordru seizes control of Earth. After a brief retreat, Superboy, Lightning Lad, Saturn Girl, and Karate Kid rescue the imprisoned Legionnaires and Substitute Heroes. In orbit above Earth, Mordru fends off the Legion until Element Lad transmutes the hydrogen atoms surrounding Mordru into soil. Having been effectively imprisoned underground, Mordru is defeated. (Note: Mordru loses his power upon being buried underground, as first seen in Adventure Comics #369 (June 1968).) In the aftermath of the crisis, the Khunds and the Dark Circle are driven out of United Planets territory. The U.P. and the Dominion sign an extended peace treaty. The Legion unanimously amends its constitution to allow married Legionnaires to remain on active duty. Lightning Lad and Saturn Girl opt to return to the team, while Bouncing Boy and Duo Damsel decline to do so.
