= Superman and the Legion of Super-Heroes (1987) =

Comic story arc featuring the Legion of Super-Heroes

- Publisher: DC Comics
- Publication date: August – September 1987
Title(s)
Legion of Super-Heroes vol. 3, #37–38
Superman vol. 2, #8
Action Comics #591
- Main character(s): Legion of Super-Heroes; Superboy (Kal-El); Superman; Time Trapper

Creative team
- Writer(s): Paul Levitz; John Byrne
- Penciller(s): John Byrne; Greg LaRocque; Mike DeCarlo

"Superman and the Legion of Super-Heroes" is story arc that was published by DC Comics, and presented in Superman vol. 2, #8, Action Comics #591, and Legion of Super-Heroes vol. 3, #37–38 from August through September 1987. It was written by Paul Levitz and John Byrne, and pencilled by Byrne, Greg LaRocque and Mike DeCarlo. The story arc was DC’s first attempt to correct the inconsistencies in Legion history created when the original Superboy was removed from mainstream DC continuity in the Man of Steel limited series.

In the aftermath of the Zero Hour: Crisis in Time! and Infinite Crisis miniseries, this story is no longer canonical.

== Plot ==
Legion of Super-Heroes co-founder Cosmic Boy and his girlfriend Night Girl return from a journey to 20th-century Earth, where they are attacked by the Time Trapper and discover that he has altered history, erasing Superboy from existence. Legionnaires Brainiac 5, Ultra Boy, Sun Boy, Cosmic Boy, Night Girl, Blok, Invisible Kid, and Mon-El attempt to reach the Time Trapper's Citadel, but are transported to 20th-century Smallville. There, the Legionnaires meet with Pete Ross, Superboy’s best friend and an honorary Legionnaire. Later that evening, Superboy attacks the Legionnaires and freezes them with the Phantom Zone Projector. Realizing that something is amiss, Pete locates and warns the remaining Legionnaires, who enter the Time Bubble and escape into the time stream as Superboy arrives.

A decade later, Brainiac 5, Sun Boy, Blok, and Invisible Kid arrive in Smallville, attracting the attention of Superman. The Legionnaires attack him, occasionally calling him Superboy. However, Superman does not recognize them, and knows of no one named Superboy except his Earth-Prime counterpart. When Superman has no recollection of meeting and being inducted into the Legion, it becomes apparent that he is a separate individual from Superboy. Suddenly, Superboy arrives, places the Legionnaires in time-stasis and returns to his own time. Superman follows, barely able to keep up with Superboy. From his Citadel, the Time Trapper observes the transpiring events and recalls that he created a "pocket universe" with its own version of Superboy.

In the pocket universe, Superman encounters Pete Ross and the Kents and is attacked by Superboy. As the two battle, Jonathan Kent attempts to stop Superman using kryptonite, but fails because Superman hails from a parallel universe and is immune to kryptonite from other universes. Superman deduces that Superboy has been holding back, giving Superman opportunities to win their battle, forcing him to admit that he knows he is in the wrong. Superboy and the Legion depart to rescue the other Legionnaires and face the Time Trapper, leaving Superman behind to preserve the timeline.

Superboy explains to the Legionnaires that the Time Trapper protected Earth in his era from destruction during the Crisis, and promised to keep it safe in return for Superboy's cooperation in defeating the Legion. When they find the Trapper, they engage him in battle, inadvertently smashing the machine that protected the pocket universe Earth from the effects of the Crisis. Superboy replaces the damaged unit with his own body. The gambit works and the Earth is saved, but the Boy of Steel is gravely weakened. With the Time Trapper having made time travel unsafe, Superboy flies the Legionnaires back to the 30th century, carrying the Time Bubble himself. Shortly after their arrival, Superboy dies in Mon-El's arms. The Legion mourns his death, remembering him as "the greatest hero of them all".

== Continuity ==
=== The Man of Steel ===
In post-Crisis on Infinite Earths continuity, Clark Kent does not become a superhero until adulthood. This creates major inconsistencies in Legion history, as Superboy was their primary inspiration. The storyline was written to correct continuity, establishing that Superboy is from another universe and that the Legion never visited the mainstream universe seen in post-Crisis continuity.

=== Removal from the Superman family ===
In the 1990s, Keith Giffen, Tom and Mary Bierbaum, and Al Gordon revised the Legion's history, replacing the Time Trapper with his former underling Glorith and having her banish Valor to the Phantom Zone. As a result, the storyline was rendered non-canonical.

In 1994, DC released the Zero Hour: Crisis in Time! limited series, rebooting the Legion of Super-Heroes and having Valor serve as their inspiration instead of Superman.

=== Post-Infinite Crisis ===
Infinite Crisis restores much of the Legion's original history, making Superman their inspiration once more. However, he only uses the name Superboy in the 31st century as a Legion member and does not become a superhero in the 21st century until he is an adult.

== Issues ==
This storyline's issues should be read in the following order:

1. Legion of Super-Heroes (Volume 3) #37
2. Superman (Volume 2) #8
3. Action Comics #591
4. Legion of Super-Heroes (Volume 3) #38

== Collected editions ==
This story is included as part of the trade paperback collection Superman: The Man of Steel, Vol. 4 (ISBN 1401204554).
