= Legion of Substitute Heroes =

Superhero team in DC Comics

Publication information
- Publisher: DC Comics
- First appearance: Adventure Comics #306 (March 1963)
- Created by: Edmond Hamilton (script); John Forte (art)

In-story information
- Base(s): Metropolis (31st century)
- Member(s): Antennae Lad; Chlorophyll Kid; Color Kid; Double Header; Dream Girl; Fire Lad; Infectious Lass; Night Girl; Polar Boy; Porcupine Pete; Rainbow Girl; Star Boy; Stone Boy

The Legion of Substitute Heroes are a group of fictional characters in the future of the DC Comics universe. The "Subs", as they are often called, are rejected Legion of Super-Heroes applicants who band together to prove that their powers are not as useless as they claim. They first appeared in Adventure Comics #306 (March 1963), and were created by Edmond Hamilton and John Forte.

The group were depicted as reasonably effective superheroes until Keith Giffen, during his tenure as Legion writer, began depicting the team as something of a joke. The Subs regain some respect when founding member Polar Boy joins the main Legion and a new Legion of Substitute Heroes is formed.

== Fictional team biography ==
The Legion of Substitute Heroes is founded by Polar Boy, Night Girl, Stone Boy, Fire Lad, and Chlorophyll Kid, five young heroes whose powers are not sufficient to earn them membership in the Legion of Super-Heroes — Stone Boy, for example, can transform into stone, but is completely immobile when using his power. After receiving a Legion flight belt as a consolation prize, the five disconsolate teenagers decide to form a group that can pinch hit for the Legion. After several failures as a team, the Subs save the Earth from an invasion by Plant Men while the Legion is off planet fighting a decoy armada of robot spaceships.

At first operating in secrecy, the Legion of Substitute Heroes is gradually recognized as a valuable asset, most notably after the assault on the Citadel of Throon when the regular Legionnaires are all defeated and Polar Boy and Night Girl are left to end the siege. Later recruits to the Legion of Substitute Heroes include Antennae Lad, Color Kid, Double-Header, Infectious Lass, Porcupine Pete, Dream Girl, and Star Boy. The team fell into disuse during the Bronze Age of Comic Books since their simple, young-readers-oriented concept left them out-of-place in the dark, socially relevant stories of the era.

The Legion of Substitute Heroes were first presented as a starring feature in DC Comics Presents #59 (July 1983). Writer/artist Keith Giffen had been asked to do a story featuring the villain Ambush Bug, and decided that the Legion of Substitute Heroes would be appropriate heroes for him to battle since they were "goofy" and obscure enough that he could do what he wanted with them without fear of arousing controversy. Exceptionally good sales on the humor-driven issue led to DC publishing a Legion of Substitute Heroes Special on April Fool's Day, 1985. Again written and drawn by Giffen, the Legion of Substitute Heroes Special became regarded as a seminal work, and Giffen was emboldened to employ the issue's boundary-pushing, often metafictional comedy in his later works.

After a colorful, if unimpressive, career, Polar Boy disbanded the Legion of Substitute Heroes and went on to attain full Legion membership. Many of the remaining members eventually join the Legion as well during the "Five Year Gap". Shortly before the "Five Year Gap", a new Legion of Substitute Heroes is formed, consisting of former Legion of Super-Heroes members Cosmic Boy, Bouncing Boy, and Duo Damsel, as well as Night Girl, a new Karate Kid (Myg), and Comet Queen.

During the events of Legion of Super-Heroes (vol. 4), the "Subs" come into their own as an insurgent group that aids a resistance to the Dominators. Old Subs Fire Lad, Stone Boy, Chlorophyll Kid, Color Kid, and Porcupine Pete are joined by new allies such as Ron-Karr and Grinn.

Following the Zero Hour: Crisis in Time! reboot, the Subs appear in Legionnaires #43 during Legion tryouts. Infectious Lass, Fire Lad, and Color Kid are on the cover, while Stone Boy, Chlorophyll Kid, Night Girl, and Polar Boy all try out.

In the Legion Worlds one-shot focusing on Braal, Cosmic Boy along with Invisible Kid, Leviathan, and Chuck Taine call themselves the "Legion of Subs"; the word 'Subs' is short for "subterfuge".

In the Legion series launched in 2004, Polar Boy and Chlorophyll Kid (renamed Plant Lad) appear as a part of the Wanderers led by Mekt Ranzz. This version of Polar Boy can only slow molecular movement. Night Girl applies for membership in the Legion but is rejected and made a reserve member (as part of the "Legion Reserve"), along with Sizzle, an energy manipulator, and Turtle, a strong and durable alien.

Versions of Infectious Lass, Polar Boy, Night Girl, Stone Boy, Fire Lad, and Chlorophyll Kid similar in appearance to their pre-Crisis on Infinite Earths counterparts appear in the limited series Tales of the Unexpected and the story arc Superman and the Legion of Super-Heroes.

In part five of the Superman and the Legion of Super-Heroes story arc in Action Comics, Fire Lad, Stone Boy, Chlorophyll Kid, and Rainbow Girl are called in to help battle the Justice League of Earth, a tyrannical, xenophobic association. After the League is defeated, the Subs claim their satellite base as their own.

In "The New Golden Age", Legion of Substitute Heroes members Rainbow Girl, Animal Lad, and Stone Boy arrive in the present to recruit Doctor Fate after his disastrous attempt to get Salem the Witch Girl into Limbo Town.

== Roster ==
- Animal Lad (Ennis Janhson): A metahuman who can transform animals into humans and vice versa. In "The New Golden Age", he was transformed into a humanoid lion under unspecified conditions.
- Antenna Lad (Khfeurb Chee Bez): A Grxyorian with large ears that enable him to pick up transmissions across space and time.
- Chlorophyll Kid (Ral Benem): A native of the planet Mardru who gained the ability to accelerate plant growth after being exposed to a hydroponic serum. He is also an expert at botany and hand-to-hand combat.
- Color Kid (Ulu Vakk): A native of the planet Lupra who gained the ability to alter color after being exposed to an interdimensional rainbow beam.
- Double-Header (Frenk/Dyvud Retzun): A Janusian who is skilled at hand-to-hand combat. However, his two heads often clash with one another, preventing them from operating effectively.
- Dream Girl (Nura Nal): A Naltorian who possesses dream-based precognition.
- Fire Lad (Staq Mavlen): A Shwarian who can breathe fire and later developed other types of pyrokinesis over time.
- Infectious Lass (Drura Sehpt): A Somhaturian who houses various bacteria and viruses in her body. They are harmful to others, but not herself.
- Night Girl (Lydda Jath): A native of the planet Kathoon who possesses superhuman strength, but only in darkness.
- Polar Boy (Brek Bannin): A native of the planet Tharr who can generate intense cold.
- Porcupine Pete (Peter Dursin): A metahuman who has porcupine-like quills across his body and can expel them as projectiles. However, he cannot emit quills individually and must do so all at once.
- Rainbow Girl (Dori Aandraison): A native of the planet Xolnar who can harness all aspects of the emotional spectrum.
- Star Boy (Thom Kallor): A native of the planet Xanthu who can manipulate density and gravity.
- Stone Boy (Dag Wentim): A Zwenian who can transform into a stone-like form. Despite being immobile and inflexible, he does possess super-strength and enhanced durability.

== In other media ==
- The Legion of Substitute Heroes appear in Legion of Super Heroes, consisting of Porcupine Pete (voiced by James Arnold Taylor), the unofficial leader and a responsible "mother's boy" who lacks control over his powers, but is determined to be a hero; Chlorophyll Kid (voiced by Alexander Polinsky), a protective and clever yet nebbish individual who is fond of creating cacti with humanoid silhouettes to confuse his enemies; Stone Boy (voiced by Yuri Lowenthal), an intelligent yet stoic member who lacks a sense of humor and occasionally forgets to revert to normal; Color Kid (also voiced by Taylor), an energetic and enthusiastic member who appears oblivious to danger and unaware of his powers' limited uses; and Infectious Lass (voiced by Kari Wahlgren), a withdrawn member who can manifest slime capable of inducing mild colds, though she is not immune to her powers. This version of the team was inspired to become heroes by Bouncing Boy, who encouraged them to keep following their dreams. Additionally, Antennae Lad, Polar Boy, Fire Lad, Double-Header, and Night Girl make non-speaking cameo appearances as Legion applicants.
- Color Kid, Fire Lad, and Night Girl appear in the one-shot comic Batman '66 Meets the Legion of Super-Heroes.
