= Rainbow Girl =

- Rainbow Girl as depicted in Action Comics #862 (April 2008). Art by Gary Frank (penciller) and Jon Sibal (inker).

Publication information
- Publisher: DC Comics
- First appearance: Adventure Comics #309 (June 1963)
- Created by: Edmond Hamilton (writer); John Forte (artist)

In-story information
- Alter ego: Dori Aandraison
- Species: Metahuman
- Place of origin: Xolnar
- Team affiliations: Legion of Substitute Heroes
- Abilities: Emotional spectrum manipulation

Rainbow Girl (Dori Aandraison) is a fictional character and a DC Comics super heroine. She first appeared in Adventure Comics #309 (June 1963) as a rejected Legion of Super-Heroes applicant. Her second appearance was 25 years later in Who's Who in the Legion of Super-Heroes #5 as a socialite. She did not appear again for nearly 20 years until Action Comics #862 as a member of the Legion of Substitute Heroes, a group composed primarily of Legion rejects.

== Fictional character biography ==
Rainbow Girl is a metahuman from the planet Xolnar who intends to join the Legion of Super-Heroes to further her ambition of becoming a holovid actress. She wins a trip to Metropolis where Legion tryouts are being held, but is rejected during her audition. Rather than return to Xolnar, Dori marries Irveang Polamar, a socialite from Metropolis, and joins the Legion of Substitute Heroes.

Dori works with the Substitute heroes to form a resistance when Earth becomes a closed-off and xenophobic society. They end up saving Earth from the Justice League of Earth, an alien coalition.

== Powers and abilities ==
Rainbow Girl can harness all colors of the emotional spectrum, including red, blue, and green. Her powers cause her emotions to change unpredictably. In her first appearance, she could generate a pheromone field resembling a rainbow, making her irresistible to others.
