= White Witch (DC Comics) =

DC Comics character

- White Witch as depicted in Who's Who: The Definitive Directory of the DC Universe #25 (March 1987).

Publication information
- Publisher: DC Comics
- First appearance: Adventure Comics #350 (November 1966)
- Created by: E. Nelson Bridwell (writer); Curt Swan (artist)

In-story information
- Alter ego: Mysa Nal; Xola Aq
- Species: Naltorian
- Place of origin: Naltor
- Team affiliations: Legion of Super-Heroes
- Notable aliases: The Hag; The Black Witch
- Abilities: Spellcasting; Flight via ring

White Witch (Mysa Nal, originally Xola Aq) is a fictional character appearing in media published by DC Comics. Created by E. Nelson Bridwell and Curt Swan, she is usually depicted as a member of the Legion of Super-Heroes in the 30th and 31st centuries. She is the sister of fellow Legionnaire Dream Girl and daughter of Kiwa Nal, the former High Seer of Naltor. Like Dream Girl, she is a native of the planet Naltor, but lacks the precognitive abilities of her species.

== Fictional character biography ==
To compensate for her inability to see the future, Mysa trained in the mystic arts on the planet Zerox, known as the 'Sorcerer's World', under the tutelage of five instructors (each having their own specialty - Air, Earth, Fire, Light and Water) and became an accomplished sorceress instead. Mysa showed a remarkable aptitude for magic and easily excelled in her studies — much to the chagrin of Mordru. Her use of magic gradually turned her hair and skin white and her eyes red.

In her debut in Adventure Comics #350, Mysa appears as the Hag, an apparently ancient magic user and an agent of Prince Evillo. When the Legion battle Evillo, two mysterious "new" members, "Sir Prize" and "Miss Terious" (actually Star Boy and Dream Girl) cast a spell that restores Hag to her true form. It was later revealed that this transformation was caused by Mordru. White Witch does not join the Legion until The Great Darkness Saga, where she helps them defeat Darkseid.

Some years later, after leaving the Legion, Mysa marries the presumedly-reformed Mordru and lives with him on the planet Tharn, which Mordru had conquered. She is subjected to mystical imprisonment and manipulation during this period until the Legionnaires rescue her. Shortly before Zero Hour, she was de-aged by Glorith to a teenager and became Jewel.

=== Reboot version ===
In post-Zero Hour continuity, Mysa is the daughter of Mordru and is unrelated to Dream Girl. The only survivor of a group of sorcerers who imprisoned Mordru, she spent a century preparing for his return, including planting the seeds for Zoe Saugin's powers and manipulating much of the girl's life to make her an ally against Mordru's next rise.

=== Threeboot version ===
In the "Threeboot" continuity, White Witch appears as a member of Mekt Ranzz's Wanderers. Her home planet is listed as "unknown".

=== Post-Infinite Crisis ===
In the limited series Final Crisis: Legion of 3 Worlds, the White Witch is imprisoned on Sorcerer's World by Mordru until she is freed by members of the Legion, including Blok. It is revealed at this point that Blok and Mysa are in a relationship. Their escape, however, is thwarted by Mordru, and then Superboy-Prime's Legion of Super-Villains. Mysa uses Dawnstar's tracking ability to open a portal directly to Legion headquarters. Fellow Legionnaire, Green Lantern Rond Vidar, forces his teammates through the portal to prevent the LSV from following. Back at Legion headquarters, Mysa attempts another portal to rescue Rond but is too late as he is killed by Superboy-Prime.

In the midst of battle, Kinetix is killed by Superboy-Prime, with Mordru absorbing her magic. Mordru uses his vastly increased powers in the villains' favor and launches a brutal attack on Blok to draw out Mysa. She reluctantly attacks Mordru with one of his own dark spells that allows her to steal his magic. Mysa re-emerges as the Black Witch with a black costume and hair, using her increased powers to defeat most of the villains single-handedly. At the conclusion of the story, the Black Witch remains a member of the Legion. However, Blok senses great trouble with his love's transformation. His concern increases as she returns to Sorcerer's World and claims Mordru's throne, vowing a vigilance against evil.

== Powers and abilities ==
Mysa Nal was trained by the master magician, Mordru. She can cast a variety of magic spells, such as creating force fields, transmuting matter, absorbing energy, and generating dimensional portals, among other feats. The only drawback is her memory, plus an additional time-consuming preparation for them, which could take up from minutes to hours. As the White Witch, Mysa possesses expertise in occultism.

== Equipment ==
As a member of the Legion of Super-Heroes, she is provided her own Legion Flight Ring. It allows her to fly and survive in the vacuum of space and other dangerous environments.

== In other media ==
- The White Witch appears in the Legion of Super Heroes episode "Trials", voiced by Lauren Tom. This version is a member of the Zeroxian council and leader of the trials that banished wizards can undergo to regain their magic.
- The White Witch appears as a character summon in Scribblenauts Unmasked: A DC Comics Adventure.
- The White Witch appears in Legion of Super Heroes in the 31st Century #18.
- The Black Witch appears in Beast Boy: Lone Wolf.

== Reception ==
Jesse Murray of Syfy placed Mysa Nal as the 22nd greatest Legion of Super-Heroes member of all time, noting her relationship drama with Mordru and calling her absorbing his powers one of the defining moments for her. Eileen Gonzalez of Comic Book Resources placed her as one of the "best" Legion superheroes out both a best and worst character list. Gonzalez noted her pivotal roles in The Great Darkness Saga with her role of stopping Darkseid and once again the role of Final Crisis stopping Mordru as defining moments as well. Caleb Bailey of Comic Book Resources described her as a "powerful magic user who could probably give Zatanna a run for her top hat".
