= Matter-Eater Lad =

DC Comics superhero

- Matter-Eater Lad as depicted in Superman: Last Stand of New Krypton #2 (June 2010). Art by Pete Woods.

Publication information
- Publisher: DC Comics
- First appearance: Adventure Comics #303 (December 1962)
- Created by: Jerry Siegel; John Forte

In-story information
- Alter ego: Tenzil Kem
- Species: Bismollian
- Place of origin: Bismoll
- Team affiliations: Legion of Super-Heroes
- Notable aliases: M-E Lad
- Abilities: Powers: Superhuman matter ingestion and digestion; Metabolism-induced super-speed; Abilities: Hand-to-hand combat (basic); Equipment: Legion Flight Ring

Matter-Eater Lad (Tenzil Kem) is a superhero appearing in media published by DC Comics, primarily as a member of the Legion of Super-Heroes in the 30th and 31st centuries. He first appeared in Adventure Comics #303 (December 1962), and possesses the power to eat matter in all forms, as do all natives of his home planet, Bismoll.

Matter-Eater Lad has made limited appearances in media outside comics, with Alexander Polinsky voicing him in the animated series Legion of Super Heroes.

== Publication history ==
Matter-Eater Lad first appeared in Adventure Comics #303 and was created by Jerry Siegel and John Forte.

== Fictional character biography ==
=== Pre–Zero Hour ===
Matter-Eater Lad is the fifteenth member inducted into the Legion of Super-Heroes, joining soon after Bouncing Boy. In his first appearance, Matter-Eater Lad explains his origins, saying that the natives of Bismoll evolved their abilities to survive after microbes rendered all normal food inedible. This gives his teeth and jaws the strength and durability to bite and chew through stone, metal, and other hard substances. He has an unrequited crush on Shrinking Violet, which features for the bulk of the Legion's run in Adventure Comics.

Matter-Eater Lad is later drafted to serve in the Bismollian senate and becomes a celebrity. He is voted out of office after being temporarily trapped in another dimension and considered legally dead.

During the "Five Year Gap" following the Magic Wars, Earth falls under the control of the Dominators and withdraws from the United Planets. Soon afterward, the members of the Dominators' "Batch SW6"—temporal duplicates of the Legionnaires—escape captivity, with a duplicate of Matter-Eater Lad among them.

=== Post–Zero Hour ===
Following Zero Hour: Crisis in Time!, which reboots the Legion's continuity, Tenzil Kem is reimagined as the Legion's primary chef.

=== Threeboot ===
In the "Threeboot", Matter-Eater Lad is reintroduced as a government agent, investigating Cosmic Boy's disappearance and the legality of his final act as Legion leader.

=== Post–Infinite Crisis ===
The events of Infinite Crisis restore an analogue of the pre-Crisis Legion to continuity. In Final Crisis: Legion of 3 Worlds #5, the SW6 incarnation of Matter-Eater Lad is among the Legionnaires summoned to fight the Time Trapper.

In Superman #694, Matter-Eater Lad is revealed to have been masquerading as Mon-El's friend Mitch. He reveals his identity by stepping in to save a woman trapped in a burning car, allowing Mon-El to continue fighting larger threats.

In the Superman: Last Stand of New Krypton storyline, Matter-Eater Lad is part of a secret team sent by R. J. Brande to the 21st century to save the future.

== Powers and abilities ==
Matter-Eater Lad possesses the innate ability to eat almost any substance. Additionally, he can move at superhuman speeds by harnessing consumed energy and determine the chemical composition of objects using his enhanced taste buds.

== In other media ==
- Matter-Eater Lad appears in Legion of Super Heroes, voiced by Alexander Polinsky.
- Matter-Eater Lad appears as a character summon in Scribblenauts Unmasked: A DC Comics Adventure.
- Matter-Eater Lad appears in Adventures in the DC Universe #10.
- Matter-Eater Lad appears in the one-shot comic Batman '66 Meets the Legion of Super-Heroes.
- Matter-Eater Lad received an action figure in Mattel's DC Universe Classics line as part of the Legion of Super-Heroes 12-pack.
- Matter-Eater Lad is referenced in a self-titled song in Guided by Voices' EP Clown Prince of the Menthol Trailer.
