= Wanderers (comics) =

Characters from the DC Universe

- Cover to Wanderers #1, art by Ken Steacy.

Publication information
- Publisher: DC Comics
- First appearance: Adventure Comics #375 (December 1968)
- Created by: Jim Shooter (script); Win Mortimer (art)

In-story information
- Base(s): 30th century
- Member(s): Aviax (Ornitho); Celebrand; Dartalon (Dartalg); Elvar (Elvo); Psyche; Quantum Queen; Re-Animage (Immorto)

The Wanderers are a fictional group of superheroes appearing in comics published by DC Comics. They first appeared as allies of the Legion of Super-Heroes in Adventure Comics #375 written by Jim Shooter, illustrated by Win Mortimer with a cover by Neal Adams. DC published a thirteen-issue series featuring the team in the late 1980s.

== Fictional history ==
=== Pre-Crisis ===
In their first appearance, the Wanderers were introduced as a team of adventurers that had existed for several years before the Legion of Super-Heroes were formed. The team's symbol was a mandala which Celebrand wore across his neck. The Wanderers were:

- Celebrand – The leader and the group's strategist.
- Psyche – A "psychic vampire" who can manipulate and feed on emotions.
- Quantum Queen – Can manipulate and transform into quantum energy.
- Elvo – A master swordsman who wields an energy sword.
- Dartalg – An expert with blowguns and darts. Has several types of darts for use, such as exploding darts.
- Ornitho – Ornitho possesses wings in his default state and can transform into birds.
- Immorto – An expert marksman with a healing factor that renders him immortal.

After meeting the Legion, the Wanderers are accidentally exposed to radiation from the Nefar Nebula which turns them evil. The Wanderers then steal a valuable gemstone and face the Legion in contests of strength. The Legion manage to figure out what had happened to the Wanderers and reverse the process. The two teams part as friends.

The Wanderers appear as guests at Duo Damsel and Bouncing Boy's wedding, and participate in the Legion's battle with Darkseid.

=== Post-Crisis ===
In June 1988, the Wanderers appeared in a self-titled series written by Doug Moench, which ran for thirteen issues. Original artist Steve Dillon redesigned the characters, but was replaced by Dave Hoover and Robert Campanella, who redesigned them again. In this series, all the Wanderers were killed and resurrected by Clonus, their Controller mentor, with upgraded powers and drastically different bodies. Celebrand is not able to be resurrected, with his cloning attempt failing.

- Dartalon (formerly Dartalg) gains quills across his body that can be fired as projectiles.
- Elvar (formerly Elvo) gains an energy sword that can trigger emotions in others.
- Re-Animage (formerly Immorto) can heal and resurrect others.
- Aviax (formerly Ornitho), Psyche, and Quantum Queen retain their original powers.

The new Wanderers go on to solve the murder of their original selves and become agents of the United Planets. On the group's final mission, Celebrand is successfully cloned back to life.

=== 2004 Legion ===
In the "Threeboot", the Wanderers are a black ops superhero team created by the United Planets to battle the Dominators. All of the Wanderers except Lightning Lord (Mekt Ranzz) are killed fighting the Dominators. Mekt then recruits heroes such as Polar Boy, Inferno, White Witch, Nemesis Kid, and Plant Lad and recreates the team. The Wanderers join forces with the Legion to stop a Dominator invasion of the United Planets. After helping the Legion defeat the Dominators, the Wanderers are offered Legion membership by Supergirl, but flee when Mekt is arrested for mind-controlling the population of his home planet Winath. Other members of the team included a figure resembling Legion of Super-Villains member Tyr and the team's coordinator Tarik.

The members of this version of the Wanderers includes:

- Grav – An anti-grav acrobat.
- Inferno – Can generate heat and light.
- Jeyra Entinn – A Saturnian telepath.
- Kid Quake – Generates earthquakes.
- Kromak – Can graft body parts together.
- Mekt Ranzz – The team leader. Generates bio-electricity.
- Micro Lass – A giant who can shrink down to six feet.
- Nemesis Kid – Powers unknown.
- Physo – Powers unknown.
- Plant Lad – Can accelerate plant growth.
- Polar Boy – Can generate ice and slow molecular movement.
- Telekinesis – A telekinetic.
- Thoom – Possesses superhuman strength.
- Vrax Gozzl – A Coluan who possesses a tenth-level intellect.
- White Witch – Wields various forms of magic.

=== Earth-247 Legion ===
Following the events of Final Crisis: Legion of Three Worlds, the 1994 Legion, whose universe was destroyed in Infinite Crisis, travel the multiverse in an attempt to find and rescue survivors of other lost universes and take the name "the Wanderers".
