= Dark Circle =

DC Comics villain group

Publication information
- Publisher: DC Comics
- First appearance: Adventure Comics #367 (April 1968)
- Created by: Jim Shooter

In-story information
- Member(s): Ontiir; Grullug Garkush; Norak Kun; Gorgoth; Rolind Siepur

The Dark Circle is a criminal organization appearing in media published by DC Comics, primarily as an enemy of the Legion of Super-Heroes. They first appeared in 1968, created by Jim Shooter as a criminal organization founded by five members and consisting of them and their clones.

The Dark Circle concept was later modified to consist of members from five core worlds instead of clones. A later version, introduced following the Zero Hour: Crisis in Time! reboot, was led by Brainiac 4 and had several known Legion enemies among their ranks instead of generic masked henchmen.

== Fictional history ==
The Dark Circle first appears in Adventure Comics #367 as an insurgent group planning to conquer the United Planets in the 30th century. It is composed of only five people and armies consisting of their clones.

Deregon, an agent of the Dark Circle and governor of Australia, seeks to start World War VII on Earth, ending a 200-year period of peace. The Legion Espionage Squad infiltrates the city of Perth to uncover Deregon's plan, but they are uncovered when Deregon spots and captures Chameleon Boy, Shadow Lass, and Light Lass, proclaiming them to be spies. When Deregon threatens to unleash an energy weapon capable of destroying Earth, Chemical King absorbs the weapon's radiation, dying in the process.

The Dark Circle launches a direct invasion of Earth during the Legion's Adventure Comics run following an attack by the Fatal Five that devastated the Legion and Earth's defenses. However, Brainiac 5 discovers the Miracle Machine and uses it to return all of the Dark Circle soldiers to their homeworlds.

The Dark Circle seeks to invade Earth indirectly through others, most notably the Khunds and Dominators, whom they manipulate into what becomes known as the Earthwar. As part of their machinations, they also release Mordru, hoping to use him against the Legion. This proves to be a mistake, however, as Mordru instead gains control of the Dark Circle. This was not immediately apparent, though, as he continued with the plans they had already drawn up. Eventually, Mordru and the Circle are defeated.

Following a five-year time skip, the Dark Circle is portrayed as a philosophical movement that rejects intellectual knowledge and is said to have existed for millions of years, predating New Genesis and Apokolips. The group's members wear hoods with a prominent dark circle (zero) over the face. Their primary foe is Valor, who opposes them physically and philosophically.

=== Post-Zero Hour ===
In post-Zero Hour continuity, the Dark Circle is an ally of the Affiliated Planets, a rival political group to the United Planets. It is led by Brainiac 4 and consists of the leaders of the Khund, the Gil'Dishpan, the Dominators, and the Sklarian Raiders.

== Members ==
- Ontiir - A member of the Dark Circle from the planet Tsauron. He is later killed by Kimball Zendak.
- Grullug Garkush - A member of the Dark Circle from the planet N'cron.
- Norak Kun - A member of the Dark Circle from the planet Naltor.
- Gorgoth - A member of the Dark Circle from the planet Fresish.
- Rolind Siepur - A member of the Dark Circle from the planet Arane II.

== Other versions ==
- An alternate universe iteration of the Dark Circle appears in Tangent: Superman's Reign #3. This version is a necromancy cult, with Etrigan the Demon, Bane, and Sargon the Sorcerer as prominent members.
- An unrelated Dark Circle, led by Tala, appears in Phantom Stranger #20.

== In other media ==
- The Dark Circle appears in the Legion of Super Heroes (2006) episode "In Your Dreams", with Grullug (voiced by Dave Wittenberg) and Ontiir (voiced by Bumper Robinson) as prominent members. This version of the group are mercenaries who utilize cloaking technology.
- The Dark Circle appears in Legion of Super-Heroes (2023), with Mon-El as a prominent member. This version of the group was founded by Brainiac in the 21st century to enable his resurrection and persists into the 31st century. It has also gone by many names such as Black Zero, Ouroboros, and the Beginning and the End.
