= Polar Boy =

DC comics character

- Polar Boy as depicted in Who's Who in the Legion of Super Heroes #5 (September 1988).

Publication information
- Publisher: DC Comics
- First appearance: Adventure Comics #306 (March 1963)
- Created by: Edmond Hamilton; John Forte

In-story information
- Alter ego: Brek Bannin
- Species: Tharrian
- Place of origin: Tharr
- Team affiliations: Legion of Substitute Heroes; Legion of Super-Heroes; The Wanderers
- Abilities: Cold generation and projection Heat resistance

Polar Boy (Brek Bannin) is a fictional character from the 30th century of the DC Universe, initially suggested by reader Buddy Lavigne of Northbrook, Illinois in the letters page of Adventure Comics #304, from January 1963. He was the first of several characters who were created based on reader suggestions.

== Fictional character biography ==
Brek Bannin originates from the planet Tharr, which is considered one of the hottest inhabited planets in the galaxy. His family lives in the hottest valley of the planet, where the inhabitants developed cryokinetic abilities to combat the persistent heat.

Bannin first tried out for the Legion of Super-Heroes, but was rejected due to being unable to control his powers. He founded the Legion of Substitute Heroes with other rejected applicants, becoming the group's first leader.

Polar Boy and the Subs aid the Legion numerous times, mostly acting as local law enforcement while the Legion was off-world. After stopping Computo's attempt to conquer Bismoll, Matter-Eater Lad's home planet, Polar Boy disbands the Substitutes. He applies for membership in the Legion and is inducted along with Sensor Girl, Magnetic Kid, Tellus, and Quislet.

=== "Threeboot" ===
Polar Boy appears in the "Threeboot" Legion as a member of the Wanderers. His powers are described as "slowing molecular movement".

=== Post-Infinite Crisis ===
In post-Infinite Crisis continuity, Polar Boy is seen in a torture camp, captured by an anti-alien movement led by Kirt Niedrigh. His arm had been ripped off, but upon his release by Superman and the Legion, he creates a replacement out of ice.

In Final Crisis: Legion of 3 Worlds, Polar Boy is among the Legionnaires assembled against Superboy-Prime and the new Legion of Super-Villains. To combat this threat, Brainiac 5 sends Polar Boy, Dawnstar, and Wildfire to the 21st century. The three retrieve a strand of Lex Luthor's hair, which the Legion uses in combination with a Kryptonian healing chamber to resurrect Superboy.

Polar Boy appears in the 2021 one-shot Tis the Season to Be Freezin', where he dates Comet Queen.

== Powers and abilities ==
Polar Boy possesses the innate ability to reduce heat and produce cold, which enables him to withstand high temperatures. He is a skilled leader, having led the Legion of Substitute Heroes on multiple occasions.

== In other media ==
- Polar Boy makes non-speaking appearances in Legion of Super Heroes.
- Polar Boy appears as a character summon in Scribblenauts Unmasked: A DC Comics Adventure.
- Polar Boy appears in Batman '66 Meets the Legion of Super-Heroes.
