= Night Girl =

DC Comics character

- Night Girl as depicted in Adventure Comics #524 (2011).

Publication information
- Publisher: DC Comics
- First appearance: Adventure Comics #306 (March 1963)
- Created by: Edmond Hamilton (script); John Forte (art)

In-story information
- Alter ego: Lydda Jath
- Species: Kathoonian
- Place of origin: Kathoon
- Team affiliations: Legion of Substitute Heroes; Legion of Super-Heroes
- Abilities: Superhuman strength that only could be used in darkness

Night Girl (Lydda Jath) is a fictional character appearing in media published by DC Comics, primarily as a member of the Legion of Super-Heroes and Legion of Substitute Heroes in the 30th and 31st centuries. She first appeared in Adventure Comics #306 (March 1963).

== Fictional character biography ==
=== Pre-Crisis ===
Night Girl is a native of the planet Kathoon, a world which is in perpetual darkness and heated by an internal power source. Lydda possesses superhuman strength, given to her by her scientist father, but only at night or in deep shadow. Her powers were negated by the presence of ultraviolet energy.

In pre-Zero Hour continuity, Night Girl unsuccessfully tries out for the Legion of Super-Heroes, who reject her due to her situational and impractical abilities. After meeting fellow Legion reject Polar Boy, she becomes a founding member of the Legion of Substitute Heroes. While having powers with such a drastic limitation reduced her effectiveness as a superhero, she becomes quite skilled at martial arts. She has a crush on Cosmic Boy, which was her motivation for leaving Kathoon and trying out for the Legion. During the Five Year Gap, she and Cosmic Boy marry and have a son, Pol (named for Cosmic Boy's late brother). Prior to their marriage, similar events were depicted in the 1967 story arc "The Adult Legion", where Night Girl and Cosmic Boy were married in an alternate future.

=== Later continuities ===
In post-Zero Hour continuity, Night Girl is rejected at a try-out and joins the Legion of Substitute Heroes once more.

In the Threeboot continuity, Night Girl appears trying out for Legion membership by fighting Ultra Boy. She is later made a member of the Legion Reserves.

The events of Infinite Crisis restore an analogue of the pre-Crisis on Infinite Earths Legion of Super-Heroes to continuity. Night Girl appears as a member of the Legion of Super-Heroes and a teacher at the Legion Academy.

== Powers and abilities ==
Night Girl has superhuman strength and durability equivalent to that of Superboy or Mon-El, but only in darkness or deep shadow. Her powers fade immediately in the presence of direct sunlight. Since her super strength is often unavailable, she has trained extensively and is a capable hand-to-hand combatant. Coming from a rogue planet not rotating a sun, she is accustomed to and can see in darkness.

== In other media ==
- Night Girl makes non-speaking cameo appearances in Legion of Super Heroes.
- Night Girl appears as a character summon in Scribblenauts Unmasked: A DC Comics Adventure.
- Night Girl appears in the one-shot comic Batman '66 Meets the Legion of Super-Heroes.
