= Chemical King =

DC Comics character

- Chemical King as depicted in Secret Origins #47 (December 1989). Art by Eric Shanower and Dave Cockrum.

Publication information
- Publisher: DC Comics
- First appearance: Adventure Comics #371 (August 1968)
- Created by: Jim Shooter (writer); Curt Swan (artist)

In-story information
- Alter ego: Condo Arlik
- Species: Metahuman
- Place of origin: Phlon (31st century)
- Team affiliations: Legion of Super-Heroes
- Abilities: Can alter the speed of chemical reactions

Chemical King (Condo Arlik) is a fictional character appearing in comic books published by DC Comics, primarily as a member of the Legion of Super-Heroes in the 31st century. He first appeared in Adventure Comics #371 (August 1968), and was created by Jim Shooter and Curt Swan.

== Publication history ==
Chemical King first appeared in Adventure Comics #371 (August 1968), and was created by writer Jim Shooter and artist Curt Swan. Prior to his debut, Chemical King was mentioned in "The Adult Legion" story in Adventure Comics #354 (1967), where his future self is stated to have sacrificed himself to prevent World War VII. The Adult Legion were initially depicted as the Legion's definitive future selves, with a later retcon establishing that the future was not absolute and that the Adult Legion originate from an alternate timeline.

== Fictional character biography ==
Chemical King was born Condo Arlik on the planet Phlon, the son of Darvon Arlik. He is a metahuman with the ability to act as a human catalyst and manipulate the speed of chemical reactions.

In Chemical King's debut in Adventure Comics #371 (1968), he is a student at the Legion Academy and works undercover to infiltrate the Legion of Super-Villains. In the following issue, Adventure Comics #372, Chemical King graduates from the Legion Academy alongside Timber Wolf and joins the Legion proper.

Chemical King is killed in Superboy and the Legion of Super-Heroes #228 (1977) while stopping Deregon, an agent of the Dark Circle, from starting World War VII, facing the same fate as his Adult Legion counterpart.

=== Post Zero Hour ===
Condo Arlik is resurrected following the 1994 storyline Zero Hour: Crisis in Time!, which reboots the Legion's continuity. He is depicted as a civilian reporter. According to The Definitive Guide to The Characters of the DC Universe (2004), he is in a same-sex relationship with Lyle Norg, the Invisible Kid.

=== Post-Infinite Crisis ===
The events of the Infinite Crisis miniseries restore an analogue of the pre-Crisis on Infinite Earths Legion to continuity. In Final Crisis: Legion of 3 Worlds #1, Chemical King is seen in the Superman Museum alongside deceased Legionnaires Invisible Kid and Ferro Lad, confirming that his death has been restored to continuity. In the Legion Academy storyline featured in Adventure Comics, one of the trainees at the Legion Academy is a native of Phlon named Hadru Jamik, a.k.a. Chemical Kid, whose father used genetic modification to grant him the same abilities as Chemical King. The elder Jamik is later forced to give the same modification to a female criminal named Queega Semk to cover his illegal gambling debts. Semk, now calling herself Alchemical Girl, attempts to force further accommodations out of Jamik, only to be beaten and captured by Chemical Kid and his fellow Academy trainees; Semk's genetic modification is removed by Academy trainee Glorith. Following the events of Flashpoint, Chemical Kid and other Academy students become full members of the Legion.

== Powers and abilities ==
Chemical King is a metahuman with the ability to act as a human catalyst. He can speed up or slow down any chemical reaction; for example, he can cause iron to rapidly rust or burst into flames from rapid oxidation. His powers can affect the chemical reactions in the human body, rendering an opponent unconscious from shock, but take several seconds and can only focus on a single opponent at a time. Late in his career, Chemical King displayed the ability to change the rate of energy reactions, causing batteries to lose power and force fields to decay,

== In other media ==
- Chemical King makes a cameo appearance in the Legion of Super Heroes (2006) episode "Dark Victory".
- Chemical King appears in Legion of Super-Heroes (2023), voiced by Eric Lopez. This version is a council member of the Legion Academy.
