= Sun Boy =

DC Comics character

- Sun Boy as depicted in Supergirl and the Legion of Super-Heroes #29 (2007). Art by Kevin Sharpe.

Publication information
- Publisher: DC Comics
- First appearance: Action Comics #276 (May 1961)
- Created by: Jerry Siegel; Jim Mooney

In-story information
- Alter ego: Dirk Morgna
- Species: Metahuman
- Place of origin: Earth (31st century)
- Team affiliations: Legion of Super-Heroes; Elements of Disaster
- Notable aliases: Inferno, Ph'yr
- Abilities: Powers: Heat and light generation Immunity to heat and radiation Equipment: Legion flight ring

Sun Boy (Dirk Morgna) is a superhero appearing in media published by DC Comics, primarily as a member of the Legion of Super-Heroes in the 30th and 31st centuries. He has the ability to generate internal solar energy to whatever degree he wishes, from enough to light a single candle to enough to melt nearly any obstacle.

Sun Boy first appeared in 1961 during the Silver Age of Comic Books.

== Publication history ==
Sun Boy first appeared in Action Comics #276 (as a cameo in a Supergirl story) and was created by Jerry Siegel and Jim Mooney. His first full appearance (albeit as an impostor) is in Adventure Comics #290.

== Fictional character biography ==
=== Silver Age ===
The original version of Sun Boy as depicted in Adventure Comics #290 (November 1961). Art by Curt Swan.

Dirk Morgna's father owns a nuclear power plant, where Dirk works as a helper. While he is delivering supplies to one of the plant's scientists, Dr. Zaxton Regulus, the machine the scientist is working on explodes resulting in the death of fellow worker Zarl Hendricks. Regulus blames the accident, and his subsequent dismissal, on the interruption. He tries to gain revenge on Dirk by throwing him into an atomic reactor; however, due to Dirk's "one-in-a-million genetic structure", the radiation gives him the power to generate heat and light rather than killing him.

Dirk applies for the Legion, as Sun Boy, but is rejected as he has only demonstrated his ability to generate light. He is later accepted when he shows his heat-generation ability.

=== "Five Years Later" ===
During the "Five Year Gap" following the Magic Wars, Sun Boy becomes leader of the Legion amidst a series of defections which results in his resignation. Soon afterwards, Sun Boy is hired by Earthgov as a public relations liaison, using his good looks and popularity to spin public opinion. Earthgov is revealed to be under Dominator control and Dirk complies with their demands despite personal misgivings. When the truth is revealed, he is branded a traitor to the Legion and Earth. Dirk is later exposed to a fatal dose of radiation when a power sphere explodes next to him during the destruction of the Moon. He is killed by his lover Circe in an act of euthanasia.

Shortly before Dirk's death, the members of the Dominators' classified "Batch SW6" escape captivity. Originally, Batch SW6 appears to be a group of teenage Legionnaire clones, created from samples taken prior to Ferro Lad's death. Later, they are revealed to be temporal duplicates of the Legionnaires, every bit as legitimate as their older counterparts. After Earth is destroyed in a disaster reminiscent of the destruction of Krypton over a millennium earlier, a few dozen surviving cities and their inhabitants reconstitute their world as New Earth. The SW6 Legionnaires remain, and their version of Sun Boy assumes the code name Inferno.

=== Post-Zero Hour ===
In post-Zero Hour continuity, Dirk Morgna is a supporting character who does not permanently possess powers. He temporarily gains superpowers on two occasions. The first is caused by Doctor Regulus injecting Dirk with radioactive gold, causing him to glow white-hot. While helping the Legion battle Regulus, he uses up all the energy and returns to normal.

Dirk is later possessed by an elemental spirit called Ph'yr, one of the four Elements of Disaster, and turns into a living humanoid fireball. Dirk gains control of his powers and helps the Legion defeat the Elements.

=== Threeboot ===
In the "Threeboot", Sun Boy is the field leader of the Legion. Additionally, his parents openly support the galactic movement the Legion represents. Confused as to whether or not his Legion membership is his desire or that of his parents, Sun Boy opts to resign from the group and decides to help the myriad of exiled descendants living in "otherspace" in the wake of the defeat of their leader, Praetor Lemnos.

This version of Sun Boy is killed by Superboy-Prime in Final Crisis: Legion of 3 Worlds #3. His body is resurrected as part of the Black Lantern Corps in the Blackest Night event.

=== Post-Infinite Crisis ===
The events of Infinite Crisis restore an analogue of the pre-Crisis on Infinite Earths Legion to continuity. Sun Boy is captured by Earth-Man and used to turn stars throughout the galaxy red. He is rescued, but traumatized and left unable to use his powers. Sun Boy is later killed in a starcruiser crash; he and the starcruiser land on an unidentified planet whose inhabitants consume his body.

=== DC Rebirth ===
In Doomsday Clock, Sun Boy is erased from existence following Doctor Manhattan's alterations to the timeline. However, Superman convinces Manhattan to undo his changes, restoring the Legion and the Justice Society of America.

== Powers and abilities ==
Sun Boy is a metahuman with the ability to generate vast amounts of electromagnetic radiation, heat, and light. He is also immune to virtually all forms of heat and radiation. As a member of the Legion of Super-Heroes, he is provided a Legion Flight Ring, which allows him to fly and survive in the vacuum of space and other dangerous environments.

== In other media ==
- Sun Boy makes non-speaking appearances in Legion of Super Heroes. This version sports fiery hair and black sclera.
- Sun Boy appears in the one-shot comic Batman '66 Meets the Legion of Super-Heroes.
