= Heroes of Lallor =

Superhero group

- The Heroes of Lallor's debut appearance in Adventure Comics #324 (September 1964); art by John Forte.

Publication information
- Publisher: DC Comics
- First appearance: Adventure Comics #324 (September 1964)
- Created by: Edmond Hamilton (script); John Forte (art)

In-story information
- Base(s): Lallor
- Member(s): Beast Boy; Duplicate Boy; Evolvo Lad; Gas Girl; Life Lass

The Heroes of Lallor are a group of superheroes in the DC Comics universe. They appear in stories featured in Adventure Comics involving the Legion of Super-Heroes.

== Fictional character biography ==
The original Heroes of Lallor are five super-powered youths born roughly during the same time period on Lallor, a planet run by a dictatorship. Their superpowers result from their parents' exposure to atomic radiation. Though raised by the government, they are eventually banished for opposing the dictatorship. The Heroes of Lallor are tricked into fighting the Legion by a relative of the Jungle King, who had fallen in battle to the Legion previously. During the battle, Duplicate Boy and Shrinking Violet fall in love; their relationship survives this battle. The dictatorship is overthrown and the heroes choose to remain on Lallor.

In Adventure Comics #339, Beast Boy is shunned by Lallorian society and flees to the planet Vorn, where he leads Vorn's wildlife in a revolt against humans. He dies saving a young girl from an attack by one of the animals and is buried on the planet Shanghalla.

Duplicate Boy and Shrinking Violet break up after she is kidnapped by Imskian rebels and replaced with Durlan imposter Yera Allon.

In post-Zero Hour Legion continuity, Beast Boy and Gas Girl make a minor appearance in Legionnaires #49 (1997). Additionally, Evolvo appears as a member of Workforce.

== Members ==
- Beast Boy (Ilshu Nor) – Can transform into any animal.
- Evolvo Lad (Sev Tcheru) – Can transform into a super-intelligent human or a super-strong Cro-Magnon.
- Duplicate Boy (Ord Quelu) – Can duplicate any super power.
- Life Lass (Somi Gan) – Can bring any object to life.
- Gas Girl (Tal Nahii) – Can turn into any gas or vapor.
