= Khund =

Fictional alien race in DC Comics

Publication information
- Publisher: DC Comics
- First appearance: Adventure Comics #346 (July 1966)

The Khunds are a fictional alien race in the DC Universe, notable for extreme violence. They first appeared in Adventure Comics #346 (July 1966), as enemies of the Legion of Super-Heroes in the 30th century.

== Fictional history ==
The Khunds control a vast galactic empire. In the 30th and 31st centuries, the species' relationship with the United Planets fluctuates between uneasy détente and open warfare. When the United Planets discover the Khundian civilization, the Khunds respond by attempting to conquer Earth. They nearly succeed with the assistance of Nemesis Kid, a saboteur who infiltrates the Legion of Super-Heroes. Nemesis Kid is exposed and the invasion repelled.

The Khunds oppose the United Planets and the Legion at numerous times in the future. During the "Earthwar" event, the Khunds and the Dark Circle invade Earth. Both groups are manipulated by the sorcerer Mordru, who almost conquers Earth before being defeated by the Legion.

=== Khundian Legionnaires ===
During the story arc "Five Years Later", Mordru casts a spell that allows him to resurrect the dead on a large scale and use them as an invasion force. The Khunds form a temporary alliance with the Legion to battle Mordru. Four superpowered Khunds join the Legion: Firefist, a cyborg; his wife Veilmist, a teleporter; Blood Claw, who possesses indestructible claws; and Flederweb, a winged bounty hunter.

The planet Sklar is invaded by undead forces led by Mordru, during which Blood Claw is killed by Magnetic Kid. Firefist attempts to murder Devlin O'Ryan, but is seemingly killed when O'Ryan deflects his blast. The group manages to defeat Mordru, and the Khunds force Veilmist and Flederweb to resign from the Legion. Some time later, it is revealed that Firefist survived, and that the Khunds have initiated a plot to destroy Weber's World. Veilmist offers to assist the Legion in foiling the plot, but is killed by Firefist. Flederweb is revealed to be not a Khund, but a mind-controlled member of an unspecified species. After he is freed from Khundian control and helps the Legion save Weber's World, Flederweb joins the Heroes of Lallor.

=== 20th and 21st centuries ===
During the 20th and 21st centuries, the Khunds are enemies of the Thanagarians because of their planetary proximity. The Khunds are among the aliens who attack Earth in the Invasion! storyline. In Wonder Woman (vol. 3) #19, the Khund homeworld is devastated by the attack of the aliens called 'Ichor'. With the assistance of Etta Candy and Wonder Woman, the Khund homeworld is saved and they gain their own Green Lantern protector.

== Powers and abilities ==
Khunds are aliens who resemble humans, but possess pink skin. They have powerful bone and muscle tissue due to evolving on a planet with high gravity.

== In other media ==
=== Television ===
- The 21st-century Khunds appear in the Justice League Unlimited episode "Shadow of the Hawk".
- An unnamed Khund appears in the Supergirl episode "Falling".

=== Film ===
The Khunds appear in Green Lantern: Emerald Knights.

=== Miscellaneous ===
The Khunds appear in Legion of Super Heroes in the 31st Century #3.
