= Kinetix =

Fictional character in the DC universe

- Kinetix as depicted in Legionnaires #45 (February 1997). Art by Phillip Moy (penciller), W.C. Carani (inker), and Tom McCraw (colorist).

Publication information
- Publisher: DC Comics
- First appearance: Legion of Super-Heroes (vol. 4) #66 (March 1995)
- Created by: Tom McCraw; Mark Waid; Lee Moder

In-story information
- Alter ego: Zoe Saugin
- Species: Metahuman
- Place of origin: Aleph (31st century)
- Team affiliations: Legion of Super-Heroes; Science Police
- Abilities: Telekinesis; Healing factor; Flight; Enhanced strength; Gravity manipulation

Kinetix (Zoë Saugin) is a superheroine appearing in the DC Comics universe, primarily as a member of the Legion of Super-Heroes in the 30th and 31st centuries. She first appeared in Legion of Super-Heroes (vol 4) #66, in March 1995.

== Fictional character biography ==
Zoe's mother Azra is an archeologist who brings her and her younger brother Thanot with her on expeditions. During one dig, Azra inhales poisonous gas, forcing Zoe to use the Moon of Kol, an artifact in her possession, to save her life. This experience makes Zoe want to gain more power to help others.

While exploring a cavern on Titan, Zoe absorbs an energy pool and gains telekinetic abilities before joining the Legion of Super-Heroes as Kinetix alongside Shrinking Violet. She and deputy leader Leviathan also develop mutual feelings for one another

After losing her powers to the Star of Akkos, Kinetix leaves the Legion to find a way to regain them. During this time, she meets the White Witch and learns to use magic, regaining her telekinesis and gaining pale skin, pointed elf-like ears, and a tail.

Violet is later possessed by the Emerald Empress' Emerald Eye of Ekron, with Kinetix almost being killed after attempting to free her. Afterwards, she learns that her mother previously met the White Witch while near death and was healed via magic, giving Zoe an affinity for magic which enabled her to absorb the energy pool on Titan.

While investigating a space-time anomaly, Zoe is enthralled by its power and becomes catatonic, changing her personality entirely. However, Brainiac 5 uses the Anywhere Machine to return her to normal. After the Legion fails to seal a spatial rift and disbands, Kinetix joins the Science Police.

When the Terrorforms invade Earth, Zoe is transformed into one and tasked with guarding the Earth. Unlike other Terrorforms, she retains part of her original personality due to her magic. She is part of the team until the Fatal 500 crisis, during which she is trapped in Limbo with the rest of the Legion.

During Final Crisis: Legion of 3 Worlds (2008), Kinetix is freed from Limbo and helps fight Superboy-Prime before being killed by him.

Kinetix returns in Superman #29 (2025). As one of the few remaining Legionnaires following an attack from the Legion of the Absolute Universe, she assists Superman in rescuing Booster Gold from the Absolute Legion's captivity.

== Powers and abilities ==
Kinetix possesses telekinetic abilities, which she primarily uses to manipulate and reshape matter with her thoughts. As a Terrorform, she possesses healing abilities, flight, superhuman strength, the ability to survive unaided in space, and control of gravity. In Final Crisis: Legion of 3 Worlds, Kinetix absorbs Earth-247's magic following its destruction, making her stronger than ever.

== In other media ==
- Kinetix makes a non-speaking cameo appearance in Legion of Super-Heroes.
- Kinetix appears as a character summon in Scribblenauts Unmasked: A DC Comics Adventure.
- Kinetix appears in Adventures in the DC Universe #10.
