= Dominators (DC Comics) =

Fictional alien race

Publication information
- Publisher: DC Comics
- First appearance: Adventure Comics #361 (October 1967)
- Created by: Jim Shooter (writer); Jim Mooney (artist); Curt Swan (artist)

Characteristics
- Place of origin: Dominion homeworld

The Dominators, collectively known as the Dominion, are a fictional alien race appearing in comics and other media by DC Comics. Coming from the outer cosmos of the DC Universe, they are highly technologically advanced, and live in a rigid hierarchical society, in which one's caste is determined by the size of a red circle on one's forehead. They are master geneticists who can manipulate the metagene to enhance members of their own caste.

== Publication history ==
The Dominators first appeared in Adventure Comics #361 (1967), written by Jim Shooter with art by Curt Swan and Jim Mooney, in which they are presented as possibly dangerous to the Legion of Super-Heroes, but do not pose an actual threat. They appeared again in Legion of Super-Heroes #241–245 in the late 1970s, as an adversarial race in an interstellar conflict with Earth in the 30th century.

In 1988 and 1989, the Dominators appeared as the villains of the "Invasion!" crossover event involving many of DC's superhero comics set in the present, written primarily by Keith Giffen and Bill Mantlo and featuring art by Todd McFarlane. Giffen also featured the characters as major villains in the Legion series he was writing with Tom and Mary Bierbaum.

Originally depicted as having light blue skin with a white circle on the forehead denoting their social rank, their later more villainous designs with yellow skin and a red circle – introduced in the 1970s and accentuated in the 1980s – has drawn comparisons to "Yellow Peril" stereotypes of east Asians, citing features such as "bald heads, slanted, narrow eyes, long, claw-like fingernails, and dressed in robes".

== Fictional history ==
=== 20th century ===
The Dominators are the primary force behind an alien alliance that attacks Earth. Their primary motivation for this is their concern at the genetic potential of humanity, as evidenced by the large number of super-powered beings on the Earth of the DC Universe, also known as the metagene. When the Invasion begins to crumble, one Dominator creates a 'gene-bomb' and detonates it in Earth's atmosphere, activating the metagenes of many humans.

After the Invasion, a nameless Dominator plays a significant role in the comic book one-shot Blasters. This comic features heroes created by Dominator testing, intending to prove that the metagene was activated by stress. The 'Blasters', which included former JLA mascot Snapper Carr, are the ones who did gain powers.

Valor discovers plans for a second invasion of Earth and thousands of humans held in genetic experimentation tanks. He leads a lengthy campaign to liberate them, aided by some of the Dominators (the Diamond Caste) who oppose the policies of their ruling caste. After freeing them, Valor helps settle the modified humans on various worlds which eventually become the homeworlds of members of the Legion of Super-Heroes.

=== 30th century ===
The Dominators are involved in a long war with the United Planets in the 30th century. Several attempts to establish peace are made. During the Dominators' first appearance in Adventure Comics #361, several members of the Legion escort a Dominion diplomatic team to secret talks, and fend off attacks from the Unkillables; descendants of people from Earth and their leader who was another Dominator who was opposed to peace.

==== "Five Years Later" ====
The Dominators are the primary opposing force in Legion of Super-Heroes (vol. 4) during its first three years of publication. As depicted therein, the Dominion secretly gains control of the Earth Government (Earthgov) in the aftermath of a galaxy-wide economic collapse. Their primary motivation is still the genetic potential of humans, and they conduct numerous experiments in secret underground chambers. Their role is known only to a few, including Dirk Morgna (Sun Boy), a former Legionnaire who is hired by Earthgov as a public relations liaison.

Due to constant harassment by Earthgov, the Legion eventually disbands. However, the Dominators fear the Legion's possible reformation, so they free mass murderer Roxxas from prison and arm him with instructions to kill the former Legionnaires. Roxxas succeeds in killing Blok, prompting the Legion to reform.

As safeguards against losing Earth, the Dominion lace a series of nuclear explosives on the Moon. This backfires when Dev-Em seizes control of the system. Though the Legion prevents Dev-Em from detonating the explosives, one of the Linear Men does, causing a catastrophe on Earth. The Dominion attempt to blame the explosion on Khund saboteurs, but their control of Earth begins to slip. The Earth is liberated from Dominator control, although some of the Dominators' actions while they controlled Earth eventually lead to the destruction of the planet.

==== "Threeboot" ====
In the "Threeboot" version of Legion continuity, the Dominators are inspired to invade Earth when a time-travelling Booster Gold inadvertently leads them to believe that fifty-two planets were planning an attack on the Dominion. They manage to seize control of Earth's technology, and send genetically modified warriors through a stargate. The Legion, with the help of the Wanderers, manage to defeat the armada. However, the Dominators still has thousands of super-powered troops at their disposal, and eventually regroup. Under the orders of Cosmic Boy, Mon-El detonates a bomb that transports their planet to the Phantom Zone.

== Alternative versions ==
A Dominator appears in Justice Riders as a prisoner of Maxwell Lord.

== In other media ==
=== Television ===
- The Dominion appear in the second season of Legion of Super Heroes as allies of Imperiex.
- The Dominators appear in media set in the Arrowverse:
  - They first appear in the crossover "Invasion!", portrayed via "cutting-edge prosthetics and computer effects", which executive producer Marc Guggenheim states was done "to achieve a feature film-quality look which is faithful to Invasion! artist Todd McFarlane's interpretation of the characters". Following a previous trip to Earth in the 1950s, they invade Earth in the present in response to the Flash altering history when he created and undid the Flashpoint timeline. They abduct and kill the President of the United States before brainwashing most of Earth's heroes and trapping them in a simulation to interrogate them for the Flash's location so they can ensure he cannot change history again. However, the heroes refuse to sacrifice their friend and join forces to defeat the Dominators, who are eventually forced to retreat.
  - The Dominators make minor appearances in Supergirl and the crossover "Crisis on Earth-X".
  - A Dominator child appears in the Legends of Tomorrow episode "Phone Home", voiced by Marc Graue. Having wound up stranded in Ivy Town, they encounter and befriend a young Ray Palmer, who nicknames the alien "Gumball". Upon learning of what happened, the Legends reunite Gumball with their mother, a Dominator queen.

=== Film ===
The Dominators make a cameo appearance in Green Lantern: Emerald Knights as one of the first races in the universe who indirectly created the Green Lantern Corps by demonstrating to the Guardians of the Universe the need for a peacekeeping force to prevent intergalactic conflict.

=== Miscellaneous ===
- Three Dominators appear in Justice League Adventures #21.
- The Dominators appear in Smallville Season 11.
