= Bouncing Boy =

DC Comics superhero

Publication information
- Publisher: DC Comics
- First appearance: Action Comics #276 (May 1961)
- Created by: Jerry Siegel; Jim Mooney

In-story information
- Alter ego: Charles Foster Taine
- Species: Metahuman
- Place of origin: Earth (31st century)
- Team affiliations: Legion of Super-Heroes
- Abilities: Inflation; Ball mimicry; Flight via ring

Bouncing Boy (Charles Foster "Chuck" Taine) is a superhero appearing in American comic books by DC Comics, usually as a member of the Legion of Super-Heroes. Born on Earth, Bouncing Boy has the power to inflate like a giant ball and bounce around. A combination of invulnerability and velocity makes him a surprisingly useful combatant. Born without any powers, he received his abilities from a super-plastic formula he believed was soda. Bouncing Boy is known for sharing a long-term romantic relationship with fellow Legionnaire Triplicate Girl, whom he eventually marries. In the reboot Legion continuity, he is the Legion's mechanic.

Bouncing Boy has appeared in various media outside comics, primarily in association with the Legion. He is voiced by Michael Cornacchia in Legion of Super Heroes (2006) and Googy Gress in Justice League Unlimited.

== Publication history ==
Bouncing Boy first appeared in Action Comics #276 (May 1961), and was created by Jerry Siegel and Jim Mooney. His addition to the Legion of Super-Heroes reflected Siegel's interest in comedy and provided a vehicle for humor.

== Fictional character biography ==
=== Silver Age ===
Chuck Taine was born on Earth with no powers. He received his ability to inflate when he accidentally drank a super plastic formula which he thought was soda pop. He applied for membership in the Legion of Super-Heroes, but was at first rejected. After he used his new power to defeat a robber using electric weaponry (which did not affect him because his bouncing kept him from being grounded), he was admitted and took the codename Bouncing Boy. With his good humor, wit and charm, Taine appointed himself the Legion's "Morale Officer".

Bouncing Boy once lost his powers while bouncing in front of a matter-shrinking machine, and was forced to resign from the Legion. He regained his powers again temporarily when the Legion faced Computo for the first time, and one of fellow Legionnaire Triplicate Girl's bodies was killed.

Bouncing Boy becomes a teacher at the Legion Academy. After once again losing his powers, he proposed to Triplicate Girl (now known as Duo Damsel). The two quickly married on Mars at Nix Olympia and both retired from the Legion because of a rule stating that Legionnaires cannot be married and remain in active duty at the same time. This rule is later overturned, but the two remain as Legion reserves. They become the headmasters of the Legion Academy and members of the Legion of Substitute Heroes alongside reservists Cosmic Boy and Night Girl.

=== Post-Zero Hour ===
In post-Zero Hour continuity, Chuck lacks powers and is the Legion's resident architect and engineer, having gone to school using his parents' money after they were killed by Daxamite terrorists. Using his parents' life insurance, Chuck was able to attend school and become an architect. He designed and helped rebuild the Legion Headquarters after it took damage from Chronos.

=== Retroboot / New Earth ===
"Infinite Crisis" restored a close analogue of the original Legion to continuity, shortly after the Magic Wars. Chuck is once more an instructor at the Legion Academy and a Legion reservist. After Triplicate Girl's second body is killed, she develops the ability to infinitely clone herself. She discovers this ability while on their third honeymoon and returns to Earth alongside Bouncing Boy to battle Superboy-Prime and the Legion of Super-Villains.

In Doomsday Clock, Bouncing Boy is among the Legion of Super-Heroes members who are erased from existence after Doctor Manhattan alters the timeline. However, he is resurrected when Superman convinces Manhattan to restore the timeline.

== Powers and abilities ==
Bouncing Boy is a metahuman with the ability to inflate into an elastic, spherical form, enabling him to bounce at high speeds. This also provides him with a limited degree of invulnerability and resistant to electric shocks. Unlike an inanimate rubber ball, which loses kinetic energy due to friction and gravity, Bouncing Boy maintains velocity as he bounces.

The reboot incarnation of Chuck Taine has no powers, but is a skilled engineer and architect. He built and pilots his own spaceship known as the Bouncing Boy.

As a Legion of Super-Heroes member, Bouncing Boy is given a Legion Flight Ring. It enables him to fly and survive in space, and acts as a long-range communicator and navigator.

== In other media ==
=== Television ===
- Bouncing Boy makes a non-speaking cameo appearance in the Superman: The Animated Series episode "New Kids in Town".
- Bouncing Boy appears in the Justice League Unlimited episode "Far From Home", voiced by Googy Gress.
- Bouncing Boy appears in Legion of Super Heroes (2006), voiced by Michael Cornacchia. This version temporarily replaced Cosmic Boy as leader of the Legion during the first season, and inspired a group of discouraged Legion applicants to form the Legion of Substitute Heroes.
- Bouncing Boy appears in the Harley Quinn episode "Icons Only", voiced by Eric Bauza. This version is a contemporary Las Vegas performer.

=== Film ===
Bouncing Boy appears in Legion of Super-Heroes (2023), voiced by Ely Henry. This version is a student of the Legion Academy.

=== Video games ===
Bouncing Boy appears as a character summon in Scribblenauts Unmasked: A DC Comics Adventure.

=== Miscellaneous ===
- Bouncing Boy appears in Adventures in the DC Universe #10.
- The Legion of Super Heroes (2006) incarnation of Bouncing Boy appears in Legion of Super Heroes in the 31st Century.
- Bouncing Boy appears in Smallville Season 11.
- Bouncing Boy appears in the one-shot comic Batman '66 Meets the Legion of Super-Heroes.
