= Cosmic Boy =

DC Comics superhero

- Cover art for Final Crisis: Legion of 3 Worlds #3 (February 2009), art by George Pérez.

Publication information
- Publisher: DC Comics
- First appearance: Adventure Comics #247 (April 1958)
- Created by: Otto Binder; Al Plastino

In-story information
- Alter ego: Rokk Krinn
- Species: Braalian
- Place of origin: Braal
- Team affiliations: Legion of Super-Heroes
- Notable aliases: Polestar; Time Trapper
- Abilities: Powers: Magnetism manipulation; Magnetic field / force manipulation; Magnetic pulse; Magnetic flight; Electromagnetic sight; Energy absorption; Geomagnetic link; Abilities: Basic hand-to-hand combatant; Enhanced intellect; Gifted leader; Equipment: Legion flight ring

Cosmic Boy (Rokk Krinn) is a superhero appearing in comics published by DC Comics. He is from the 31st century, and is a founding member and original leader of the Legion of Super-Heroes.

Cosmic Boy has appeared in various media outside comics, primarily those featuring the Legion of Super-Heroes. He is voiced by Wil Wheaton in Legion of Super Heroes (2006) and portrayed by Ryan Kennedy in Smallville.

== Publication history ==
Cosmic Boy first appeared in Adventure Comics #247 (April 1958) and was created by Otto Binder and Al Plastino.

== Fictional character biography ==
=== Original ===
Rokk Krinn, best known as Cosmic Boy, is a founding member of the Legion of Super-Heroes, along with Lightning Lad and Saturn Girl who possesses the innate ability to generate magnetic fields. The three originally met en route to Earth, where they foiled an assassination attempt on businessman R. J. Brande. With Brande's financial backing, the three founded the Legion of Super-Heroes, based on the example of 21st-century hero Superboy. Cosmic Boy's brother Pol joins the Legion as Magnetic Kid before being killed during the Magic Wars.

In the pre-Zero Hour Legion, Cosmic Boy was romantically involved with Night Girl (Lydda Jath). During the "Five Year Gap" following the Magic Wars, Rokk loses his powers after being exposed to a magnetic dampener during a war between Braal and Imsk (the homeworld of Shrinking Violet). He leaves the Legion and returns to Braal to live there with Lydda. The two have a son named Pol, named for Rokk's brother.

When Reep Daggle reforms the Legion, Rokk rejoins the group as Polestar, utilizing special gauntlets that replicate his original powers. However, he renounces the gauntlets after they began to affect his mind.

During the Zero Hour: Crisis in Time! event, Rokk learns that he is apparently destined to become the Time Trapper. Shortly afterward, he and the rest of the Legion are erased from existence when the timeline is rebooted.

=== Post-Zero Hour ===
In post-Zero Hour continuity, Rokk Krinn came from a poor family but became a superstar in the Braallian sport of Magnoball, earning the nickname "Cosmic Boy" after winning the Magnoball Cosmic Games. He sent most of his earnings to his family, unaware that his manager, Alex Cuspin, was embezzling them. After being approached by R. J. Brande to form the Legion, Saturn Girl discovered and revealed the truth about Cuspin. Rokk promptly dismissed Cuspin and had him arrested. The founding members voted him leader, but soon after found out that Leviathan, a Science Police veteran, had been appointed to leadership by the United Planets. Leviathan would shortly thereafter give Cosmic Boy the leadership position after the death of Kid Quantum. Cosmic Boy later voluntarily steps down from leadership, feeling that he has served as leader for long enough.

=== "Threeboot" continuity ===
In the fifth volume of Legion of Super-Heroes, Cosmic Boy is the leader of the Legion of Super-Heroes. After transporting the Dominators' homeworld to the Phantom Zone, seemingly destroying it, Cosmic Boy is voted out of office and replaced by Supergirl. He then joins a superhero team from the 41st century, who come back in time to offer him membership.

=== Post-Infinite Crisis ===
Cosmic Boy is re-introduced following Infinite Crisis, which restores an analogue of the pre-Crisis on Infinite Earths Legion to continuity.

Comics writer Geoff Johns said about the character:

Cosmic Boy is like the all-around leader who puts it all on his shoulders, but he's magnetic. His powers are all about magnetics, and so it carries over to his personality. And he struggles to bring all the Legion back together. He's like, 'We can do this. We can bring it together'. It comes naturally to him.

=== Post-Rebirth ===
In Doomsday Clock, Cosmic Boy is among the Legionnaires who appear in the present after Doctor Manhattan undoes his alterations to the timeline, restoring the Legion and the Justice Society of America.

== Limited series ==
Cosmic Boy
- Cosmic Boy #1 (December 1986), art by Steve Lightle.

Publication information
- Publisher: DC Comics
- Schedule: Monthly
- Format: Miniseries
- Publication date: December 1986 – March 1987
- No. of issues: 4
- Main character(s): Cosmic Boy; Night Girl; Time Trapper

Creative team
- Written by: Paul Levitz
- Penciller(s): Keith Giffen; Ernie Colón; Bob Smith
- Editor: Karen Berger

Cosmic Boy was featured in a four-part limited series, cover dated December 1986 through March 1987. A tie-in to the Legends limited series, it was written by Paul Levitz, with art by Keith Giffen, Ernie Colón, and Bob Smith.

In the series, Cosmic Boy and Night Girl have traveled from the 30th century to enjoy a vacation in the 20th century. They find themselves threatened by many citizens and residents of the United States, who have been manipulated by Glorious Godfrey as part of Darkseid's scheme to discredit Earth's superhero community. Soon after arriving, Cosmic Boy encounters Superman, who does not recognize him despite Superboy being a member of the Legion for years. Cosmic Boy and Night Girl fear that something is terribly wrong with history. A space shuttle mission carrying a satellite crucial to Earth's future development of space travel goes awry, with the shuttle exploding. Cosmic Boy magnetically catches the payload and sends the debris harmlessly toward the ocean, but American soldiers assume that he is a foreign spy. They attack him, implementing Ronald Reagan's directive that outlaws all superhero activity.

Seeking to protect the satellite, Cosmic Boy and Night Girl travel to NASA facilities in Houston where they meet Jason, one of the astronauts who designed the shuttle. They help to quell a riot that breaks out when demonstrators break down the gates at NASA, and Cosmic Boy becomes convinced that some unseen enemy is deliberately trying to prevent the mission. As they depart, the couple notes that both of their families are from worlds settled during the Great Emigration from Earth. They are unaware that the last name of Jason — the astronaut they just met — is Krinnski, which implies that he may be a distant ancestor of Cosmic Boy.

Cosmic Boy and Night Girl return to the 30th century, where time travel experts Brainiac 5 and Circadia Senius may be able to determine the problem. Upon entering the timestream, their Time Bubble encounters a storm and shakes violently. They are forced to return to the 20th century. They turn to Jason Krinnski for assistance, who does his best to help them repair the Time Bubble. However, their second attempt to leave fails, as if there was a barrier blocking them. Realizing that they need a massive power source to propel the Bubble to the 30th century, Cosmic Boy harnesses energy from Earth's magnetic field. They breach the barrier, but are propelled to the end of time, where they confront the Time Trapper.

The Trapper toys with the couple, giving them an hour to return to the 30th century. They eventually make their way through the Trapper's Citadel to their Time Bubble, just as the last grains in the hourglass are about to fall. Cosmic Boy uses his power to warp the hourglass, closing it so that the last grain will never fall. Amused, the Trapper allows them to leave. He directs the Time Bubble to the 30th century, placing it right in front of Legion Headquarters. He warns the couple that this will be their final journey through time, and that "the next occasion when a Legionnaire dares break the time barrier will be the last". As the two of them race to warn the Legion about what has occurred, the Trapper realizes that the Legionnaires will be returning for him.

The events of this series are continued in the 1987 story arc "The Greatest Hero of Them All".

== Powers and abilities ==
Cosmic Boy possesses the innate ability to manipulate magnetism, being able to manipulate, repel, and attract metal objects of varying sizes. Naturally, the more metal is in an object the easier it is for him to affect magnetically. Cosmic Boy has been known to pull large iron meteors and satellites down from space with minimal effort. He can use his magnetic power on rocks that contain iron ore to pull or use them as projectiles. He can also magnetize metal objects so that they become magnets themselves and make them stick to other metal objects. His power cannot affect non-metals, such as organic substances like wood or flesh. His control is such that he can manipulate electronic records or the iron in blood. He has been known to use a uniform with ferrous fibres so he can fly with his own powers, but usually relies on a Legion flight ring.

As a member of the Legion of Super-Heroes, Cosmic Boy is provided a Legion Flight Ring. It allows him to fly and protects him from the vacuum of space and other dangerous environments.

== In other media ==
=== Television ===
Ryan Kennedy as Cosmic Boy in Smallville.

- Cosmic Boy appears in the Superman: The Animated Series episode "New Kids in Town", voiced by Chad Lowe.
- Cosmic Boy makes a non-speaking cameo appearance in the Justice League Unlimited episode "Far From Home".
- Cosmic Boy appears in Legion of Super Heroes (2006), voiced by Wil Wheaton. This version is often busy traveling the universe and maintaining the Legion's reputation, which strains his relationship with them, particularly Lightning Lad. As a result, Bouncing Boy temporarily replaces him as the Legion's leader after Lightning Lad calls for a new leader to be elected.
- Cosmic Boy appears in Smallville, portrayed by Ryan Kennedy. This version rarely speaks and displays the most determination of his teammates.

=== Film ===
- Cosmic Boy appears in Lego DC Comics Super Heroes: Justice League – Cosmic Clash, voiced by Yuri Lowenthal. This version comes from a future Earth that Brainiac conquered by the year 2116.
- Cosmic Boy appears in Legion of Super-Heroes (2023), voiced by Eric Lopez.
- The Legion of Super Heroes (2006) incarnation of Cosmic Boy makes a non-speaking cameo appearance in Scooby-Doo! and Krypto, Too!.

=== Video games ===
- Cosmic Boy appears as a character summon in Scribblenauts Unmasked: A DC Comics Adventure.
- Cosmic Boy makes a non-speaking cameo appearance in Brainiac's ending in Injustice 2.

=== Miscellaneous ===
- Cosmic Boy appears in Adventures in the DC Universe #10.
- Cosmic Boy appears in the one-shot comic Batman '66 Meets the Legion of Super-Heroes.
