= John Forte (comics) =

American cartoonist

John Robert Forte, Jr. (October 6, 1918 – May 2, 1966) was an American comic-book artist, active from the early 1940s on, best known as one of the primary pencilers of DC Comics' early Legion of Super-Heroes stories.

Forte additionally drew for Timely Comics and Atlas Comics — the 1940s and 1950s predecessors, respectively, of Marvel Comics — as well as for the American Comics Group. Fiction House, Lev Gleason, and Quality Comics. He worked primarily for DC Comics beginning 1958, penciling Jimmy Olsen and Lois Lane stories for the Superman family of titles. Forte was also the artist for "Tales of the Bizarro World" which preceded Tales of the Legion of Super-Heroes as the lead feature in Adventure Comics. He also illustrated pulp magazines, calendars, clothing catalogs and newspaper advertising. John Forte died of cancer at the age of forty-seven in Valley Stream, New York, on May 20, 1966.

Preceded by n/a	"Legion of Super-Heroes" feature in Adventure Comics artist 1962–1965	Succeeded by Curt Swan
