= Curt Swan =

American comics artist (1920–1996)

- Portrait of Curt Swan by Stan Drake.
- Born: Douglas Curtis Swan; February 17, 1920 Minneapolis, Minnesota, U.S.
- Died: June 17, 1996 (aged 76) Norwalk, Connecticut, U.S.
- Area: Penciller
- Notable works: Action Comics; Adventure Comics; Superman
- Awards: Inkpot Award, 1984; Will Eisner Award Hall of Fame, 1997

Douglas Curtis Swan (February 17, 1920 – June 17, 1996) was an American comics artist. The artist most associated with Superman during the period fans call the Bronze Age of Comic Books, Swan produced hundreds of covers and stories from the 1950s through the 1980s.

== Biography ==
=== Early life and career ===
Curt Swan was born in Minneapolis on February 17, 1920, the youngest of five children. Swan's Swedish grandmother had shortened and anglicized the original family name of Svensson while living in Canada at the turn of the century. Father John Swan worked for the railroads; mother Leontine Jessie Hanson had worked in a local hospital. As a boy, Swan's given name – Douglas – was shortened to "Doug," and, disliking the phonetic similarity to "Dog," Swan thereafter reversed the order of his given names and went by "Curtis Douglas," rather than "Douglas Curtis."

Having enlisted in Minnesota's National Guard's 135th Regiment, 34th Division in 1940, Swan was sent to Europe when the "federalized" division was shipped initially to Northern Ireland and Scotland. While his comrades in the 34th eventually went into combat in North Africa and Italy, Swan spent most of World War II working as an artist for the G.I. magazine Stars and Stripes. While at Stars and Stripes, Swan met writer France Herron, who eventually directed him to DC Comics.

During this period Swan married the former Helene Brickley, whom he had met at a dance at Fort Dix, New Jersey, and who was stationed near him in Paris in 1944 as a Red Cross worker; they were married in Paris in April 1945. Shortly after returning to civilian life in 1945, he moved from Minnesota to New Jersey and began working for DC Comics. Apart from a few months of night classes at the Pratt Institute under the G.I. Bill, Swan was an entirely self-taught artist. After a stint on Boy Commandos he began to just pencil pages, leaving the inking to others.

=== Superman ===
Adventure Comics #296 (May 1962), cover art by Swan, inks by George Klein

Initially, Swan drew many different features, including "Tommy Tomorrow" and "Gangbusters", but slowly he began gravitating towards the Superman line of books. His first job pencilling the iconic character was for Superman #51 (March–April 1948). Many comics of the 1940s and 1950s lacked contributor credits, but research shows that Swan began pencilling the Superboy series with its fifth issue in 1949. He drew the first comics meeting of Superman and Batman in Superman #76 (May–June 1952). The two heroes began teaming on a regular basis in World's Finest Comics #71 (July–August 1954) in a story which was also drawn by Swan. Swan always felt that his breakthrough came when he was assigned the art duties on Superman's Pal, Jimmy Olsen, in 1954.

Swan didn't take to line editor Mort Weisinger's controlling style. Swan discussed this period in an interview: "I was getting terrible migraine headaches and had these verbal battles with Mort. So it was emotional, physical. It just drained me and I thought I'd better get out of here before I go whacko." After leaving comics for the advertising world in 1951, Swan soon returned, for DC's higher paychecks. And as biographer Eddy Zeno notes, "The headaches went away after [Swan] gained Weisinger's respect by standing up to him."

Around 1954, Swan unsuccessfully pitched an original comic strip for newspaper syndication. Called Yellow Hair, it was about a blond boy raised by Native Americans. A couple of years later, starting with the episode of June 18, 1956, Swan drew the Superman daily newspaper comic strip, which he continued on until November 12, 1960.

In the view of comics historian Les Daniels, Swan became the definitive artist of Superman in the early 1960s with a "new look" to the character that replaced Wayne Boring's version. The Composite Superman was co-created by Swan and Edmond Hamilton in World's Finest Comics #142 (June 1964). Swan and writer Jim Shooter crafted the story "Superman's Race with the Flash!" in Superman #199 (August 1967) which featured the first race between the Flash and Superman, two characters known for their super-speed powers. Over the years, Swan was a remarkably consistent and prolific artist, often illustrating two or more titles per month. Swan remained as artist of Superman when Julius Schwartz became the editor of the title with issue #233 (January 1971), and writer Denny O'Neil streamlined the Superman mythos, starting with the elimination of Kryptonite. Among Swan's contributions to the Superman mythos, he and writer Cary Bates co-created the supervillains Terra-Man and the 1970s version of the Toyman as well as the superhero Vartox. Writer Martin Pasko and Swan created the Master Jailer character in Superman #331 (January 1979).

=== Later life and career ===
Swan's cover for Superman #423 (Sept. 1986), the first half of "Whatever Happened to the Man of Tomorrow?"

After DC's 1985 12-issue limited series Crisis on Infinite Earths and with the impending 1986 revision of Superman by writer/artist John Byrne, Swan was released from his duties on the Superman comics. Critic Wallace Harrington summed up Swan's dismissal this way:

... the most striking thing that DC did was to completely turn their back on the one man that had defined Superman for three decades ... They closed the door and turned out the lights on the creator that had defined their whole line. With no real thanks, no pomp nor circumstance, DC simply relieved Curt of his artistic duties on Superman. Curt Swan who had drawn Superman in Action, Lois Lane, Jimmy Olsen, Superman, and World's Finest, and drew Superboy in Adventure Comics, who was the quintessential Superman artist of the 1960s, '70s and '80s. He became just another victim of the 1980s implosion. Gone.

Swan's last work as regular artist on Superman was the non-canonical 1986 story "Whatever Happened to the Man of Tomorrow?", written by Alan Moore.

After this, Swan continued to do occasional minor projects for DC, including the artwork of what is thought to be one of the rarest Superman comics ever published, titled "This Island Bradman" (written by David P. Levin), a comic book that was privately commissioned in 1988 by real estate tycoon Godfrey Bradman as a Bar Mitzvah gift for his son, as well as an Aquaman limited series and special in 1989, and various returns on illustrating Superman, including the prestige format graphic novel one-shot Superman: The Earth Stealers in 1988.

In 1995, Swan did four illustrations for Penthouse Comix for the Larry Niven essay "Man of Steel, Woman of Kleenex," which detailed the problems that Superman would face in having sexual intercourse and reproducing with a human woman, using arguments based on humorous yet logical reconciliations between physics, biology, and the abilities of Kryptonians as presented in the Superman comic books.

Swan's swan song was five pages published posthumously in the 1996 special Superman: The Wedding Album.

Swan died June 17, 1996, in Wilton, Connecticut. Helene Swan died at the age of 91 on January 27, 2012.

A previously unpublished story featuring Swan's art debuted in Action Comics #1000.

== Art style ==
Comics historian Arlen Schumer praised Swan's ability to depict "the spectrum of human emotion, from agony to anger, mournful to mirthful." As characterized by critic Paul Gravett, Swan's Superman made "... Krypton's last son in exile, the alien in our midst, into someone like us, who would think and feel as well as act, who was approachable, big-hearted, considerate, maybe physically superpowerful yet gentle, noble yet subtly tragic." In a similar vein, Swan biographer Eddy Zeno calls Swan "the Norman Rockwell of ... comics." Gary Groth, the editor-in-chief of The Comics Journal, was less complimentary, remarking that "Swan is symptomatic of what the industry requires. They adore Swan at DC because they give Swan a script and it says 'Superman flies out the window'...and there's Superman flying out the window. The script says 'Clark Kent walking down the hall' and there's Clark Kent walking down a hall. He's just a technician who does exactly what's required of him."

With his frequent inker Murphy Anderson from 1970 to 1974 and 1988 to 1989, the pair's collaborative artwork came to be called "Swanderson" by the fans. Despite his and Anderson's success together, Swan's favorite inker was Al Williamson, with whom he only worked for a short time, from 1985 to 1986.

== Legacy ==
In 1985, DC Comics named Swan as one of the honorees in the company's 50th anniversary publication Fifty Who Made DC Great.

Swan's favorite story – one of the few he both pencilled and inked – was "I Flew with Superman" from Superman Annual #9 (1983), in which Swan himself appears and helps Superman solve a case.

In a story titled "Swan's Way", issue #92 of the Legion of Super-Heroes (May 1997) memorialized Swan with a cameo appearance as an art teacher.

Elliot S. Maggin:

We were both philosophical products of the message we spent a career delivering to the hero-worshippers of the world. We both believed in truth, justice and the American way: a personal torah. It was good finally to learn that we had so much in common when finally we gave each other the space to reveal it.

Alan Moore:

I'd like to have asked him how much [Swan] identified with Superman, how much of himself he put in there. I feel that he probably did on some private level; that there was some sort of a moral strength that he aspired to, that he drew into those figures. Something almost indefinable, but some essence of himself.

The Westport Arts Center dedicated a granite plaque in memoriam of Curt Swan, alongside other Connecticut artists.

== Awards ==
Swan received an Inkpot Award in 1984 and was elected to the Will Eisner Award Hall of Fame in 1997.

== Bibliography ==
Swan's comics work (interior pencil art) includes:

=== DC Comics ===
- Action Comics (Tommy Tomorrow) #127–171; (Superman) #189, 244, 253, 256, 260, 265, 269-270, 272, 277–278, 280, 283–284, 286–288, 290, 295, 297–298, 303–305, 307, 309–312, 318–321, 325–327, 330, 334, 336, 338–339, 343, 351–352, 355, 358–359, 367–390, 393–473, 477–485, 487–500, 502–524, 527–534, 537, 542–544, 547, 555–557, 568, 583, 658 (full art); #601–642 (two-page stories) (Note: During this period, the series was renamed Action Comics Weekly); #600, 650, 667, 723 (among other artists) (1948–1996)
- Action Comics Annual #2 (among other artists) (1989)
- Adventure Comics (Superboy) #156, 159–160, 167, 169, 174, 176, 178–180, 182, 184–185, 187, 190–192, 195, 197–198, 201, 205, 208, 210–212, 214–220, 223–225, 227, 230, 238, 241–243, 246, 249, 257, 279, 285, 291, 293, 301–302, 311, 320, 327–328, 330, 334, 336, 339; (Legion of Super-Heroes) #313, 340–347, 349–360, 365–372 (1950–1968)
- The Adventures of Superboy #22 (1992)
- The Adventures of Superboy Special #1 (1992)
- Adventures of Superman #471 (full art); #480, 536 (among other artists) (1990–1996)
- Adventures of Superman Annual #2 (among other artists) (1990)
- All-Star Squadron #15 (1982)
- The Amazing World of Superman, Metropolis Edition #1 (pencils from Carmine Infantino layouts) (1973)
- Aquaman vol. 3 #1–5 (pencils from Keith Giffen layouts) (1989)
- Aquaman Special #1 (1989)
- Batman #70 (1952), #358 (1983)
- Batman: A Word to the Wise (Note: Comic book sponsored by Zellers Inc. to promote and support the cause of literacy in Canada) (1992)
- The Batman Chronicles (Robin) #6 (1996)
- The Batman Family (Batgirl and Robin) #5, 7, 11 (1976–1977)
- Boy Commandos #16–20, 22, 25–31, 33 (1946–1949)
- DC Challenge #10 (1986)
- DC Comics Presents #30, 35, 47, 50–51, 53, 56, 58, 67–68, 71, 77–80, 87, 91–92 (1981–1986)
- DC Special Series (Superman) #5 (1977)
- DC Super Stars (Superboy) #12 (1977)
- Detective Comics (Boy Commandos) #110–127, 129–133, 135, 138–143, 149 (1946–1949)
- The Fury of Firestorm Annual #4 (among other artists) (1986)
- Gang Busters #10–13, 15–20, 22, 25–27, 29, 32–42 (1949–1954)
- Ghosts #4 (1972)
- Hawk and Dove #28 (with Greg Guler) (1991)
- Hawk and Dove Annual #1 (among other artists) (1991)
- He-Man and the Masters of the Universe: Faith is a Killer (16-page insert that appeared in several DC titles) (1982)
- Heroes Against Hunger #1 (two pages) (1986)
- House of Mystery #1–6, 8, 10–29 (1951–1954)
- Justice League Europe Annual #2 (among other artists) (1991)
- Justice League Quarterly (General Glory) #16 (among other artists) (1994)
- The Krypton Chronicles miniseries #1–3 (1981)
- L.E.G.I.O.N. '94 Annual #5 (among other artists) (1994)
- Legion of Super-Heroes vol. 2 #300 (five-page story); #306 (with Keith Giffen) (1983)
- Legion of Super-Heroes vol. 3 #45 (five-page story, among other artists) (1988)
- Legion of Super-Heroes vol. 4 #31 (with Colleen Doran) (1992)
- Legion of Super-Heroes Annual vol. 2 #3 (1984)
- Legion of Super-Heroes Annual vol. 3 #2 (1986)
- Legion of Super-Heroes Annual vol. 4 #5 (among other artists) (1994)
- M.A.S.K. vol. 2 #1–9 (1987)
- Mr. District Attorney #9–10, 15, 21 (1949–1951)
- The New Adventures of Superboy #51 (1984)
- The New Teen Titans #5, 25 (1981–1982)
- The New Teen Titans vol. 2 #43 (1988)
- The New Titans #81, 86 (1991–1992)
- The New Titans Annual #6 (full art); #8 (among other artists) (1990–1992)
- The Outsiders #21 (1987)
- The Phantom Stranger #5 (two-page story) (1970)
- The Power of Shazam! #8, 11, 17 (with Pete Krause) (1995–1996)
- Real Fact Comics #7–8, 13, 16–17, 19, 21 (1947–1949)
- Secret Hearts #17 (1953)
- Secret Origins vol. 2 (Justice League of America) #46 (Note: Swan penciled two stories in this issue); (Legion of Super-Heroes) #46–47 (1989–1990)
- Showcase (Manhunters) #5 (1956)
- Star-Spangled Comics (Newsboy Legion) #55, 61–64; (Robin) #72; (Manhunters Around the World) 94–108, 114–120; (War stories) #131–133 (1946–1952)
- Star Spangled War Stories #3–13, 16–17 (1952–1954)
- Star Trek #37 (1984)
- Star Trek Annual #3 (1988)
- Star Trek vol. 2 Annual #2 (with James Fry) (1991)
- Strange Adventures #1–4, 6 (1950–1951)
- Strange Sports Stories #1–3 (1973–1974)
- Superboy #5, 8, 10–20, 22–23, 25–48, 50–58, 63, 70, 73, 80, 89, 92, 98, 100, 103–107, 112–113, 117–118, 121, 123, 126, 129, 132, 136, 138, 146–148 (1949–1968)
- Superboy vol. 2 #9–17 (1990–1991)
- Superman #51, 73, 76, 89, 97, 118, 121, 127, 130, 137, 139, 144–182, 186–187, 192–195, 197–199, 201, 207–215, 217–300, 303–306, 310–363, 365–368, 370–392, 395–396, 398–399, 401–403, 408–423 (1948–1986)
- Superman Annual #9–10 (1983–1984)
- Superman vol. 2, #35, 48 (full art); #50, 114 (among other artists) (1989–1996)
- The Superman Family #164–172, 174–181, 186–187 (1974–1978)
- Superman and Wonder Woman: The Computer Masters of Metropolis (Note: Comic book sponsored by RadioShack) (1982)
- Superman: Victory by Computer (1981)
- Superman III: The Official Adaptation (1983)
- Superman IV: The Quest for Peace – Movie Special (1987)
- Superman's Girl Friend, Lois Lane #17, 27, 29, 32–33, 35–39, 41, 45, 54, 59, 68, 72, 86, 89, 91–92, 94, 96, 98, 102–103, 113, 122 (1960–1972)
- Superman's Pal Jimmy Olsen #1–91, 95, 104, 106–114, 116–117, 119, 121–123, 125–129, 131, 140 (1954–1971)
- Superman: The Man of Steel #5 (with Jon Bogdanove); #58 (among other artists) (1991, 1996)
- Superman: The Secret Years, miniseries, #1–4 (1985)
- Superman: The Wedding Album (among other artists) (1996)
- Swamp Thing vol. 2 #165 (with Phil Hester) (1996)
- Who's Who in the Legion of Super-Heroes #7 (among other artists) (1988)
- The Witching Hour #80 (1978)
- Wonder Woman #212, 214, 219, 221, 224 (1974–1976)
- Wonder Woman vol. 2 Annual #1 (among other artists) (1988)
- World's Finest Comics (Boy Commandos) #21–23, 25–31; 33–38 (Manhunters Around the World) #61–62; (other stories) #70; (Superman and Batman) #71–77, 84–85, 109, 116–117, 124, 141–173, 177–179, 184, 196–197, 223–225, 227, 230, 234, 239, 243, 245 (1946–1977)

=== Malibu Comics ===
- Genesis #0 (1993)

=== Marvel Comics ===
- Captain America #616 (illustration) (2011) (Note: Captain America sketch from 1994)
- Crime Case Comics #25 (1950)
- The Official Handbook of the Marvel Universe #5 (1986)

=== Topps Comics ===
- Jack Kirby's TeenAgents #2 (1993)

== Notes ==
Preceded by n/a	Superman's Pal Jimmy Olsen penciller 1954–1966	Succeeded by Pete Costanza
Preceded by Wayne Boring	Action Comics penciller 1958–1986	Succeeded by John Byrne
Preceded by Al Plastino	Superman penciller 1958–1986	Succeeded by Jerry Ordway
Preceded by John Forte	"Legion of Super-Heroes" feature in Adventure Comics artist 1966–1968	Succeeded by Win Mortimer
Preceded by John Byrne	Action Comics penciller 1988–1989	Succeeded by George Pérez
