= Batman '66 =

DC comic book series

- Cover of Batman '66 #1

Publication information
- Publisher: DC Comics
- Schedule: Monthly
- Publication date: July 2013 – February 2016
- No. of issues: 30
- Main character(s): Batman and Robin

Creative team
- Written by: Jeff Parker
- Artist(s): Mike Allred (cover); Various (interior)

Batman '66 is an American superhero comic book series published by the comic book publishing company DC Comics featuring Batman as a continuation of the 1966–1968 television series, which had starred Adam West and Burt Ward as Batman and Robin. Most issues of the series were written by Jeff Parker and Tom Peyer, with cover art provided by Mike Allred. It published 30 issues from 2013 to 2016. The setting has been used in crossovers since 2016: Batman '66 Meets the Green Hornet, Batman '66 Meets the Man from U.N.C.L.E., Batman '66 Meets Steed and Mrs. Peel, Batman '66 Meets Wonder Woman '77, and Archie Meets Batman '66.

== Publication history ==
In 2013, DC began publication of Batman '66, which tells all-new stories set in the world of the 1966–1968 TV series. It was written by Jeff Parker, and featured cover art by Mike Allred while interior art was done by different artists each issue. Original characters from the television series such as the Bookworm, the Minstrel, the Sandman, Olga, Queen of the Cossacks, Zelda the Great, Shame, King Tut, and Marsha, Queen of Diamonds all made their first comic book appearances in the series. The Joker, The Penguin, Riddler, Catwoman and Mr. Freeze also appeared in the series. Characters who were not featured in the television series (some of them were created after the series ended) also appeared in Batman '66, with Red Hood and Dr. Quinn appearing in issue #3, Poison Ivy in issue #26, Bane in issue #27, The Scarecrow and Killer Croc in issue #28, Kobra in issue #72, Copperhead in Batman '66 Meets Wonder Woman '77 issue #5, Professor Hugo Strange in Batman '66 Meets the Man from U.N.C.L.E., and Ra's al Ghul and Talia al Ghul in Batman '66 Meets Wonder Woman '77. Also, new characters and vehicles were created for the series such as the Bat-Jet, used to follow False-Face to Mount Rushmore, as well as a new villainess named Cleopatra.

The series was released both physically and digitally. The series was cancelled in 2015, with physical issue #30, cover-dated February 2016, and digital issue #73.

In April 2014, the first five issues were collected for the Batman '66 Vol. 1 trade paperback. Additional volumes collecting the rest of the issues have since been released.

Writer Len Wein and artist José Luis García-López produced a comics adaptation of Harlan Ellison's outline for a Two-Face intended for the original 1960s TV series. In June 2014, Kevin Smith and Ralph Garman's six-issue Batman and the Green Hornet crossover miniseries, Batman '66 Meets The Green Hornet, began publication. There are also three other crossover miniseries with fellow 1960s and 1970s TV shows; The Man from U.N.C.L.E. with Batman '66 Meets the Man From U.N.C.L.E., TV's The Avengers with Batman '66 Meets Steed and Mrs. Peel, and Wonder Woman, as played by Lynda Carter, in Batman '66 Meets Wonder Woman '77. In July 2017, a new crossover one-shot issue called Batman '66 Meets the Legion of Super Heroes was released featuring a crossover with the titular characters. In July 2018, the Batman archvillains attempted to take over Riverdale in the crossover miniseries Archie Meets Batman '66.

== Continuity ==
This continuity was designated Earth-66 in the post-Dark Crisis multiverse.

== Collected editions ==
Title	Material collected	Publication dates	ISBN
Batman '66 Vol. 1	Batman '66 #1–5	April 8, 2014	978-1401247218
Batman '66 Vol. 2	Batman '66 #6–10	April 28, 2014	978-1401254612
Batman '66 Vol. 3	Batman '66 #11–16	December 8, 2015	978-1401257507
Batman '66 Vol. 4	Batman '66: The Lost Episode #1 and Batman '66 #17–22	May 17, 2016	978-1401261047
Batman '66 Vol. 5	Batman '66 #23–30	December 13, 2016	978-1401264833
Batman '66 Meets the Green Hornet	Batman '66 Meets the Green Hornet #1–6	March 24, 2015	978-1401252281
Batman '66 Meets the Man from U.N.C.L.E.	Batman '66 Meets the Man from U.N.C.L.E. #1–6	September 13, 2016	978-1401264475
Batman '66 Meets Steed and Mrs. Peel	Batman '66 Meets Steed and Mrs. Peel #1–6	September 27, 2017	978-1401268206
Batman '66 Meets Wonder Woman '77	Batman '66 Meets Wonder Woman '77 #1–6	October 3, 2017	978-1401273859
Batman '66 Omnibus	Batman '66 #1–30, Batman '66: The Lost Episode #1 and Solo #7's "Batman A-Go-Go!"	August 8, 2018	978-1401283285
Archie Meets Batman '66	Archie Meets Batman '66 #1–6	April 18, 2019	978-1682558478

== Reception ==
Response to the series was positive. Benjamin Bailey of IGN gave the first issue a 9.8 out of 10, calling it "nothing short of brilliant", saying that "even if you aren't a fan of the classic TV show, you'll have a good time here. It's a blast from start to finish". Meanwhile, Den of Geek gave the first issue an 8 out of 10, saying that "Batman '66 looks like it might just fit right in with the spirit of the show's better episodes". The A.V. Club's Oliver Sava, in reviewing the second issue, called it "a delightfully silly look at a bygone era of Batman, (and) also one of the year's finest superhero comics".

== See also ==
- Wonder Woman '77
- Superman '78
- Batman '89
