= Legion of Super-Heroes =

Fictional characters in DC comics

- Artwork for the cover of Legion of Super-Heroes vol. 6, 9 (March, 2011 DC Comics); Art by Yıldıray Çınar

Publication information
- Publisher: DC Comics
- First appearance: (Original); Adventure Comics #247 (April 1958) (Reboot); Legion of Super-Heroes vol. 4 #0 (October 1994) (Second reboot); Teen Titans/Legion Special (November 2004) (Post-Infinite Crisis); Justice League of America vol. 2 #8 (April 2007)
- Created by: Otto Binder (writer); Al Plastino (artist)

In-story information
- Base(s): Legion Clubhouse; Legion Outpost; Legion World

Roster

The Legion of Super-Heroes is a superhero team appearing in American comic books published by DC Comics. Created by writer Otto Binder and artist Al Plastino, the Legion is a group of superpowered beings living in the 30th and 31st centuries of the DC Comics Universe. The group was formed after being inspired by Superboy (Clark Kent)'s feats and they aim to keep the universe safe by protecting it from the threats of multiple enemies. They first appeared in Adventure Comics #247 (April 1958).

The team is closely associated with the original Superboy (Clark Kent) character and in their first appearances was portrayed as a group of time travelers. Later, the Legion's origin and back story were fleshed out, and the group was given its own monthly comic.

Initially Superboy's role as the inspiration for the formation of the Legion and their multiple adventures together were retconned in the 1990s by editorial mandate as a consequence of the editorial decision at that time to eliminate the origin of Superman as Superboy. In the 2000s, the origin of Superman as Superboy was restored once the editorial ban was lifted, resulting in the classic origin of the Legion being created because the founding Legionnaires were inspired by Superboy's exploits in Smallville to be considered canon once again. The multiple adventures together in the future of the Legion of Super-Heroes with Superboy (Clark Kent), Supergirl, Conner Kent and later Jon Kent, are also considered to be canon.

The team has undergone two major reboots during its run. The original version was replaced with a new rebooted version following the events of the Zero Hour: Crisis in Time! storyline in 1994 and another rebooted team was introduced in 2004. A fourth version of the team, nearly identical to the original version, was introduced in 2007. In 2019, DC announced a new series written by Brian Michael Bendis and drawn by Ryan Sook.

== Publication history ==
=== Original continuity (1958–1994) ===
The cover of Adventure Comics #247 (April 1958), the Legion's first appearance. Art by Curt Swan and Stan Kaye

Superboy was the featured series in Adventure Comics in the 1950s. In Adventure Comics #247 (April 1958) by writer Otto Binder and artist Al Plastino, Superboy met three teenagers from the 30th century: Lightning Boy, Saturn Girl, and Cosmic Boy, who were members of a "super-hero club" called the Legion of Super-Heroes. Their club had been formed with Superboy as an inspiration, and they had time travelled to recruit Superboy as a member. After a series of tests, Superboy was awarded membership and returned to his own time.

Although intended as a one-off story focusing on Superboy, the Legion proved so popular that it returned for an encore in Adventure Comics #267 (December 1959). In this story, Lightning Boy had been renamed Lightning Lad, and their costumes were close to those they wore throughout the Silver Age of Comic Books. The Legion's popularity grew, and they appeared in further stories in Adventure Comics, Action Comics, and other titles edited by Mort Weisinger over the next few years. The ranks of the Legion, only hinted at in those first two stories, was filled with new heroes such as Chameleon Boy, Invisible Kid, Colossal Boy, Star Boy, Brainiac 5, Triplicate Girl, Shrinking Violet, Sun Boy, Bouncing Boy, Phantom Girl, Ultra Boy, and Supergirl.

In Adventure Comics #300 (September 1962), the Legion received their own regular feature, cover-billed "Superboy in 'Tales of the Legion of Super-Heroes'". While they shared space with Superboy solo stories for a couple of years, they eventually displaced Superboy from the title entirely as their popularity grew. Lightning Lad was killed in Adventure Comics #304 (January 1963) and revived in issue #312 (September 1963).

The Adventure Comics run established the Legion's general workings and environment. A club of teenagers, the Legion operate out of a clubhouse resembling an inverted rocket ship which looked as if it had been driven into the ground. The position of Legion leader rotates among the membership. Each Legionnaire is required to possess one natural superpower that is not shared with another member; despite this, several members had overlapping powers, particularly Superboy, Supergirl, Mon-El, and Ultra Boy. Some issues included comical moments where candidates with bizarre, useless, or dangerous abilities would try out for membership and be rejected; five of these candidates went on to form the Legion of Substitute Heroes. The Legion was based on Earth and protected an organization of humans and aliens called the United Planets alongside the Science Police. The setting for each story was 1,000 years from the date of publication.

In Adventure Comics #346 (July 1966), Jim Shooter, 14 years old at the time, wrote his first Legion story. Soon thereafter, Shooter became the regular writer of the Legion stories, with Curt Swan, and later Win Mortimer, as artist. Shooter wrote "The Death of Ferro Lad", in which Ferro Lad was killed—the first "real" death of a Legionnaire (although Lightning Lad had been believed dead for a while before). Shooter introduced many other enduring concepts, including the Fatal Five, Karate Kid, Princess Projectra, Shadow Lass, the Dark Circle, Mordru, and the "Adult Legion", a possible future version of the Legion.

The Legion's last appearance in Adventure Comics was #380 (May 1969), and they were displaced by Supergirl in the next issue. The early 1970s saw the Legion relegated to the status of back-up feature. First, the team's stories were moved to Action Comics for issues #377–392 (June 1969 – September 1970). Following Mort Weisinger's retirement from DC, the Legion was passed to the oversight of editor Murray Boltinoff and began appearing occasionally as a backup in Superboy, starting with #172 (March 1971), with writers E. Nelson Bridwell and Cary Bates and artist George Tuska. Dave Cockrum began drawing the series with Superboy #184 (April 1972), again increasing the team's popularity.

==== Superboy and their own title ====
The Legion of Super-Heroes as seen in the 1976 DC Calendar. Art by Neal Adams and Dick Giordano.

The first comic book published under the title Legion of Super-Heroes was a four-issue series published in 1973 that reprinted Legion tales from Adventure Comics. In the same year, the Legion returned to cover billing on a book when Superboy became Superboy starring the Legion of Super-Heroes with #197 (August 1973). Crafted by Bates and Cockrum, the feature proved popular and saw such events as the wedding of Bouncing Boy and Duo Damsel in Superboy #200 (Feb 1974). Issues #202 (June 1974) and #205 (Dec. 1974) of the series were in the 100 Page Super Spectacular format. Cockrum was replaced on art by Mike Grell as of issue #203 (August 1974) which featured the death of Invisible Kid. With #231 (September 1977), the book's title officially changed to Superboy and the Legion of Super-Heroes and also became a "giant-size" title. At this point, the book was written by longtime fan Paul Levitz and drawn by James Sherman, although Gerry Conway frequently wrote as well. Saturn Girl and Lightning Lad were married in All-New Collectors' Edition #C-55 (1978), a treasury-sized special written by Levitz and drawn by Grell. In #241–245 (July–December 1978) Levitz and Sherman (and then Joe Staton) produced what was at that time the most ambitious Legion storyline: "Earthwar", a galactic war between the United Planets and the Khund, with several other villains lurking in the background. During this period, Karate Kid was spun off into his own 20th century-based self-titled series, which lasted 15 issues. Levitz left the book, to be replaced full-time by Gerry Conway.

Superboy departed from the Legion due to a villain's plot, and the book was renamed simply The Legion of Super-Heroes starting with issue #259 (January 1980). Editor Jack C. Harris hired Steve Ditko as guest artist on several issues, a decision which garnered a mixed reaction from the title's readership. Jimmy Janes became the regular artist in a lengthy tale by Conway (and later Roy Thomas) involving Ultra Boy's disappearance during a mission, and his long odyssey to rejoin the team. This story told the tale of the Legionnaire Reflecto (only glimpsed during the "Adult Legion" stories in Adventure Comics), featured villainy by the Time Trapper and Grimbor the Chainsman, and saw Superboy rejoin the team.

==== Paul Levitz era ====
Paul Levitz returned to write the series with #284. Pat Broderick and Bruce Patterson illustrated the title for a short time before Keith Giffen began on pencils, with Patterson, and then Larry Mahlstedt, on inks. The creative team received increased popularity following "The Great Darkness Saga", which ran from #287; #290–294; and Annual #3, featuring a full assault on the United Planets by Darkseid. Comics historian Les Daniels observed that, "Working with artist Keith Giffen, Levitz completed the transformation of Legion into a science-fiction saga of considerable scope and depth."

The Legion celebrated issue #300 (June 1983) by revisiting the "Adult Legion" storyline through a series of parallel world short stories illustrated by a number of popular Legion artists from previous years. The story served to free up Legion continuity from following the "Adult Legion" edict of previous issues.

Giffen's style changed abruptly a few issues later, to a darker and sketchier style inspired by Argentinian artist José Muñoz. A new Legion of Super-Heroes comic (the third publication under the title) was launched in August 1984. It used a new "deluxe" printing format utilizing Baxter paper instead of the cheaper newsprint that classic comics had always been printed on. The existing Legion series, still on newsprint and renamed Tales of the Legion of Super-Heroes with issue #314, continued running new material for a year, then began reprinting stories from the new Legion of Super-Heroes with issue #326. Tales continued publishing reprints until its final issue, #354 (December 1987).

The new series was launched in August 1984 with a five-part story featuring the Legion of Super-Villains. Giffen left in the middle of the story and was replaced by Steve Lightle, who stayed on the book for a year. The debut story arc saw the death of Karate Kid in issue #4 (November 1984). Levitz and Lightle co-created two Legionnaires, Tellus and Quislet, whose unusual appearances contrasted with the humanoid appearances of the other Legionnaires. Greg LaRocque began a lengthy run in #16 (November 1985), including a crossover with John Byrne's recently rebooted Superman titles, The Man of Steel and Superman (vol. 2). The crossover was the first of several attempts by DC editors to explain the origins and fate of Superboy and his history with the Legion, in light of the revisions to the DC Universe caused by Crisis on Infinite Earths that removed Superman's career as Superboy from his personal history. In the crossover, the Legion's Superboy was revealed to have come from a parallel pocket universe created by the Time Trapper. The crossover ended with Superboy's death. Levitz's run ended with the return of Giffen and a four-part story "The Magic Wars", concluding in #63 (August 1989).

==== "Five Years Later" ====
Giffen took over plotting as well as penciling with the Legion of Super-Heroes volume 4 title which started in November 1989, with scripts by Tom and Mary Bierbaum and assists by Al Gordon. Five years after the Magic Wars, the United Planets is a darker place and the Legion a distant memory. However, a group of former Legionnaires worked to re-form the Legion in this harsh new universe, in which Earth was ruled by the Dominators.

Shortly after this storyline began, the decision was made to retroactively remove Superboy from the Legion's history. Writer Mark Waid stated that "Because of inter-office politics and machinations ... it was decided that there was no Superboy, but we weren't even allowed to reference him at all." This left the question of where the Legion's inspiration came from without the influence of Superboy. The writers' solution was a retcon in which Mon-El served in the role of paragon instead of Superboy, with several more retcons to follow. Issue #5 featured an alternate universe story in which the restructuring took place, and the Time Trapper was replaced in continuity by his onetime underling Glorith.

One major storyline during this period was the discovery of Batch SW6, a group of clones of the early Legion (from their Adventure Comics days), created by the Dominators. Giffen's original conclusion for the storyline was that the clones would have been revealed to be the real Legion, and the ones whose adventures had been chronicled since the 1950s were the clones. The adult Legion's secret programming would kick in, forcing them to fight the younger Legion and leading to a fight to the death in which Legionnaires on both teams would die, with the victims' names being picked at random. Afterwards, the older team would explore the Vega System as a 30th-century version of the Omega Men in a new series while the younger team would act as the main Legion on Earth. Giffen's other conclusion was for several of the younger and older Legionnaires to die while liberating Earth from the Dominion. The older Legion would defend Earth while the younger Legion would act as the last line of defense for the United Planets as the Omega Men.

Instead, a parallel title, Legionnaires, was launched, starring the "SW6" Legion, whose origins were not resolved until the Zero Hour crossover. Legionnaires was lighter in tone than the main Legion book, and it was written by the Bierbaums and drawn by Chris Sprouse. Giffen left the book after a storyline which involved the destruction of Earth, and the Bierbaums continued writing, overseeing the return of several classic characters. When the Bierbaums left, writer Tom McCraw took over and made a number of changes, such as forcing several Legion members underground, which required them to take on new identities and costumes, and bringing back long-absent Legionnaire Wildfire.

In 1994, DC rebooted the team's continuity. As part of the Zero Hour storyline, the Legion's original continuity came to an end in September 1994 with Legion of Super-Heroes (vol. 4) #61. The "Five Years Later" era of the Legion was not subsequently reprinted by DC Comics until the announcement of a hardcover omnibus collection scheduled for release in 2020, almost 26 years after the conclusion initial storyline.

=== Rebooted (1994–2004) ===
The Post-Zero Hour Legion, with their allies and enemies. Art by Phil Jimenez.

Following Zero Hour, a new Legion continuity was created, beginning with a retelling of the origin story starting in Legion of Super-Heroes (vol. 4) #0 and then continued in the spin-off sister series Legionnaires #0 (both released in October 1994). Lightning Lad was renamed Live Wire, and after the group's founding, a large number of heroes were added to the roster. Several members from the previous continuity were given new codenames, and some new heroes were added, including XS (the granddaughter of Barry Allen, the second Flash), Kinetix, Gates, and Sensor, a reimagined version of Princess Projectra.

While in some ways following the pattern of the original continuity, the new continuity diverged from the old one in several ways: some characters died as they had previously, others did not, and some Legion members spent time in the 20th century where they recruited Ferro. The Legion also started out having to earn the respect of the United Planets, which they did through two well-earned victories: successfully defending Earth from the White Triangle, a group of Daxamite racial purists; and exposing United Planets President Chu as the mastermind behind the Braal-Titan War, the Sun-Eater hoax, the formation of the Fatal Five and the brainwashing of future Legionnaire Jan Arrah.

New writers Dan Abnett and Andy Lanning came on board with penciller Olivier Coipel to produce a dark story leading to the near-collapse of the United Planets and the Legion. In the wake of the disaster, a group of Legionnaires disappeared through a spatial rift and the two existing Legion series came to an end. The miniseries Legion Lost (2000–2001) chronicled the journey of these Legionnaires to return home, while the ensuing miniseries Legion Worlds (2001) showed what was happening in the United Planets during their absence.

A new series, The Legion, was launched in which the Legion was reunited and given a new base and purpose. Written for its first 33 issues by Abnett and Lanning, the series was cancelled with issue 38. The most notable addition to the team during the title's publication was the post-Crisis Superboy (Kon-El), who had previously been granted honorary membership.

=== "Threeboot" continuity (2004–2009) ===
Cover art for Legion of Super-Heroes (vol. 5) #37 (Feb. 2008); art by Francis Manapul and John Livesay.

Following a crossover with the Teen Titans in Teen Titans (vol. 3) #16 and the Teen Titans/Legion Special, a new Legion of Super-Heroes series was launched (the so-called "Threeboot" incarnation), written by Mark Waid (who had previously rebooted the title following the events of Zero Hour) and penciled by Barry Kitson. This new series recreated the team from the beginning and used the Boy/Lad/Girl/Lass/Kid codenames, which the previous continuities had moved away from using.

Initial issues of this series reintroduced the characters, and provided new and divergent origins for them. Most characters resemble their previous counterparts in costume and powers, with the most notable exceptions including Chameleon Boy, now called simply Chameleon and depicted as androgynous; Star Boy, who in this version of the Legion is black; Colossal Boy, who is now a giant who shrinks to human size; and Phantom Girl, who exists in two universes at once and has conversations with people in her own dimension while talking to Legionnaires at the same time.

The future universe of this Legion is an emotionally and mentally repressive society which involves human sexuality and contact being kept at arms' length as well as Orwellian surveillance of minors. The Legion's main goal is social reform as well as protecting people and inspiring them with the legends of superheroes of old, even though the team isn't appreciated by government authorities.

The Legion is worshiped by thousands of young people on different worlds, collectively known as the "Legionnaires", who follow the group in a cult-like manner. The Legionnaires based on Earth keep a constant vigil outside Legion headquarters.

Beginning with issue #16, The Legion of Super-Heroes (vol. 5) was retitled Supergirl and the Legion of Super-Heroes with Supergirl traveling to the future and joining the Legion. With issue #31, Tony Bedard replaced Waid as writer. The title reverted to The Legion of Super-Heroes with issue #37 and Jim Shooter became the writer. The series ended with issue #50, in which the script was credited to "Justin Thyme", a pseudonym previously used by uncredited comic book artists.

=== Post-Infinite Crisis (2007–2011) ===
Statues depicting the Legion in the "Lightning Saga" crossover. From Justice Society of America vol. 3 #5 (June 2007). Art by Fernando Pasarin.

The "Lightning Saga" crossover in Justice League of America (vol. 2) #8–10 and Justice Society of America (vol. 3) #5–6 featured the return of the original versions of Star Boy (now called Starman), Dream Girl, Wildfire, Karate Kid, Timber Wolf, Sensor Girl, Dawnstar, and Brainiac 5. Though several differences between the original and Lightning Saga Legions exist, Geoff Johns stated that this incarnation of the Legion shares the same history as the original Legion up to the events of Crisis on Infinite Earths, with Clark Kent having joined the team as the teenage Superboy prior to the start of his career as Superman.

This version of the Legion next appeared in the "Superman and the Legion of Super-Heroes" storyline in Action Comics #858–863. In the year 3008, the Earth's sun has turned red and several failed Legion applicants who were born on Earth have banded together to form the Justice League of Earth under the leadership of Earth-Man after he claims that Superman was a human who gained his powers from "Mother Earth". Earth-Man uses the claim to have Earth secede from the United Planets and ban all aliens from Earth, resulting in several Legionnaires going underground. With the help of Superman, the Legion eventually restores the sun to its normal state, and defeats Earth-Man and the Justice League of Earth just as the United Planets is about to attack the Earth.

This version of the Legion next appeared in the 2008 Final Crisis: Legion of 3 Worlds limited series, written by Johns and drawn by George Pérez. The mini-series features the post-Infinite Crisis Legion and Superman teaming up with the "Reboot" and "Threeboot" incarnations of the Legion to fight Superboy-Prime, the Legion of Super-Villains, and the Time Trapper. It was revealed in the mini-series that the "Reboot" Legion came from Earth-247 (a homage to the Legion's first appearance in Adventure Comics #247), which was destroyed in Infinite Crisis, and the "Threeboot" Legion came from Earth-Prime. Johns stated that the intent of the mini-series was to validate the existence of all three versions of the team while simultaneously restoring the pre-Crisis Legion's continuity. The incorporation of the three teams into mainstream DC continuity was shown in Action Comics #864 (June 2008). In the story, Batman recounts the Justice League of America and Justice Society of America's battle alongside the original Legion to defeat Mordru, the "Reboot" team's assistance in destroying a Sun-Eater in the 20th century, and his own recent encounter with the "Threeboot" team.

This version of the Legion was featured in the second Adventure Comics series from September 2009 to October 2011, with the feature focusing on the Legion Academy from April 2011 onwards. This Legion played a part in the "Superman: Last Stand of New Krypton" storyline in 2010, where the ongoing continual events of "The Lightning Saga" concluded in its entirety. A new Legion of Super-Heroes ongoing series was published from May 2010 to August 2011, written by Paul Levitz and drawn by Yildiray Cinar, featuring the Retroboot version of the team.

=== The New 52 (2011–2015) ===
Legion of Super-Heroes was relaunched in September 2011 with issue #1. Simultaneously, DC Comics cancelled Adventure Comics and replaced it with a new volume of Legion Lost. While Legion of Super-Heroes continued the adventures of the team from that title's previous volume, Legion Lost featured Wildfire, Dawnstar, Timber Wolf, Tyroc, Tellus, Gates and Chameleon Girl. The Legion Lost characters are stranded on 21st century Earth during a mission to save the future, and they are forced to remain there after contracting a pathogen that could destroy the 31st century if they returned. Legion Lost ended with the time-lost Legionnaires still stranded in the 21st century.

This era of the Legion's publication concluded with issue #23 in August 2013, with the title's cancellation. In the final issue, the United Planets disbanded the Legion after a cataclysmic battle with the Fatal Five, and the individual Legionnaires retired to their homeworlds or the Science Police. The entire Legion was remobilized to battle Infinitus in the six-issue "Infinitus Saga" in Justice League United, written by Jeff Lemire (December 2014 – May 2015). The "Infinitus Saga" featured Brainiac 5 as leader, the return of the Legion Lost team to active Legion status and the inclusion of a number of Legionnaires from other continuities in the Legion's active ranks.

=== Legion of Super-Heroes (2019) ===
Team members of the Legion of Super-Heroes, art by Ryan Sook.

A new Legion of Super-Heroes series from writer Brian Michael Bendis and artist Ryan Sook was announced by DC Comics in June 2019. A prelude two-part series entitled Legion of Super-Heroes: Millennium was released in September and October, with the ongoing series debuting in November 2019. The series ended in January 2021 with 12 issues.

=== Next Level (2026) ===
As part of DC's Next Level publishing initiative, a new Legion of Super-Heroes series from writer Joshua Williamson and artist Hayden Sherman was announced by DC Comics in June 2026. This series takes place in a new future timeline created following the events of DC K.O. where superheroes are outlawed and the United Planets are protected by the Persuaders.

== Alternative versions ==
Alternative versions of the Legion of Super-Heroes have appeared in various DC comic books.

- The Legion of Super-Heroes appeared in a single panel in the Kingdom Come miniseries which takes place on Earth-22 in the DC Multiverse. This version of the team appears again briefly, in the closing pages of a story arc detailing the Earth-22 Superman's sojourn with the Justice Society of America in the 21st century (of Earth-0).
- In the DC/Marvel combined "Amalgam Universe", a merged version of the Legion, Marvel's Guardians of the Galaxy and characters from Marvel's 2099 reality appeared in the title Spider-Boy Team-Up as the Legion of Galactic Guardians 2099.
- An alternative version of the Legion based on King Arthur's court appeared in Legionnaires Annual #1 (1994).
- Legion of Super-Heroes Annual #7, part of the 1996 "Legends of Dead Earth" event, showed Wildfire as the last survivor of the original Legion, forming a new team.
- The "DC One Million" event, which featured characters based in the 853rd century, featured twenty-six teams called the Justice Legion, with the Justice Legion L being based on the Legion of Super-Heroes. Among its members are Brainiac 417 (a disembodied intelligence from the merged worlds of Colu and Bgztl), Cosmicbot (a metallic being who commands the world of Braal), the M'onelves (a super-powered collective of miniature beings from the bonded Daxam-Imsk), Titangirl (a living psychic manifestation of the telepaths of Titan), Implicate Girl (loosely inspired by Triplicate Girl, she contains the entire planet Cargg inside her third eye and can access any Carggite's skills), as well as an elemental darkness called the Umbra (from Talok VIII) and the Chameleon (a religious fundamentalist from the "Chameleon World," once known as Durla). The Justice Legion includes secondary members like Dreamer (the last precognitive of the dead world Naltor, who has a thoughtscreen in her forehead), "Wildflame" (the comatose remains of Wildfire), and Cris Kend (the Superboy of the 843rd century summoned by Brainiac 417 to stop an apocalypse). One thousand years later, the story of the Justice Legion L is told to Dav, Vara and Chec, three youths from a techno-agrarian society inside a tesseract on Earth. The three are empowered by Wildfire to become the Legion of the 863rd century.
- Legions from several timelines created by the Time Trapper encounter the "Reboot" Legion and fight each other.
- An alternative version of the Legion appears in the Superman/Batman story arc "Absolute Power". Three members of the Legion of Super-Villains, Lightning Lord, Cosmic King, and Saturn Queen, go back in time to change the course of history. They are later joined by Beauty Blaze and Echo. In the alternate timeline, they use members of the Legion of Super-Heroes who were either brainwashed or converted to their cause.
- The Elseworlds two-part limited series Superboy's Legion featured an alternative version of the Legion formed by Superboy. In the story, the infant Kal-El is stranded in an asteroid belt and remains there, in stasis, until found in 2987 by R. J. Brande, a thousand years after Krypton's destruction. At the age of 14, "Kal Brande", also known as Superboy, joins Cosmic Boy and Saturn Girl in forming "Superboy's Legion", later known as the Legion of Super-Heroes.
- In Static #14, part of the Worlds Collide crossover between DC Comics and Milestone Media, the villain Rift combines Metropolis and Dakota City, creating a futuristic amalgamation of the two. The combined city is home to a pastiche of the Legion called the League of Super-Teens. Static, Rocket, and Superboy are transformed into Static Lad, Rocket Gal, and Fabulous Boy. Other unseen members, mentioned by name, are Adhesive Lad, Burnrubber, Dough Boy III, Fabulous Man, Fan Boy, Fat Boy, Foxtrot Lass, Frat Boy, Hoot-Man, Itty-Bitty Girl, Kite Lad, Kodak Kid, Mall Hair Girl, Maniac 5, Phenomenal Lass, Procrastination Lad, Seltzer Lad, Sneeze Lad, Sterno Lad, Super Nazi-Fighter, and Very-Big Boy. Superman, Hardware, Icon, Steel, and Transit were also members. This team vanishes when Dakota and Metropolis are separated.
- In the DC Universe: Legacies mini-series, a young Clark Kent is approached by the Legion of Super-Heroes to join their team and is given a Legion flight ring. However, Legions from multiple points further in the future arrive asking Kent for help, and a fight breaks over which Legion will receive his help first. Kent rebukes the multiple Legions, returns the ring noting that it means something special to each Legionnaire, and tells them to come back when they can tell him what that special thing is.
- In DC All In, an alternative version of the Legion is introduced, called the Omega Legion. This version of the group is from the 31st century of the Absolute Universe, a world corrupted by Darkseid, who they worship as their master. The Legion, led by Saturn Girl, is sent to the main universe to prepare it for Darkseid's arrival.

== Parodies and homages ==
- Legion of Super-Heroes Annual #5 (1994) featured the Legion in a parody of The Wizard of Oz.
- In DC's New Year's Evil: Mr. Mxyzptlk #1 (1998), Mxyzptlk attempts to recruit a parody of the Legion, called the Logjam of Super-Heroes, from his comic book collection. Despite its many members, the only ones who were properly identified were Batter-Eater Lad, Butler-Eater Lad, Butter-Eater Lad, Button-Eater Lad, and Mutton-Eater Lad (all take-offs on Matter-Eater Lad), Kid Kid, Kid Lass, Loud Kid, Negative Lass, Lightning Lice, and Beachball Boy.
- In 1977, X-Men (vol 1) #107 introduced a team of heroes called the Imperial Guard. Many of their members, designed by former Legion artist Dave Cockrum, were based on Legionnaires: Astra (Phantom Girl), Electron (Cosmic Boy), Fang (Timber Wolf), Hobgoblin (Chameleon Boy), Impulse (Wildfire), Magic (Princess Projectra), Mentor (Brainiac 5), Midget (Shrinking Violet), Nightside (Shadow Lass), Quasar (Star Boy), Smasher (Ultra Boy), Starbolt (Sun Boy), Tempest (Lightning Lad) and Titan (Colossal Boy). The team is led by Gladiator (Mon-El and Superman).
- The satire series normalman featured a 33rd-century team called the Legion of Superfluous Heroes. In their first appearance, Uranus Girl wants to save normalman, but Lightweight Lad points out they need to do roll call first. The roll call, which includes a seemingly endless list of members, is a recurring gag in the series. When Lightweight Lad loses his place in the roll and is going to start over, he is killed by the other members of the Legion (who also die due to the resulting blast). It is revealed the Legion is in a time loop.
- The Legion of the Stupid Heroes one-shot is a parody of the Legion published by Blackthorne Publishing in 1987.
- Big Bang Comics #12 features a Legion homage called the Pantheon of Heroes that hails from the 30th century. Its members are Angelfish, Anti-Matter Lad, Brain Boy, Butterfly Queen, Clone Boy, Devil Boy, Dragon Fist, Galactic Lad, Golden Girl, Ghost Girl, Gravity Girl, Jupiter Boy, Kid Warlock, Laughing Boy, Nature Boy, Photon, Snowstar, Tele-Girl, and Ultragirl.
- SFA Spotlight #5 (May 1999) published by Shanda Fantasy Arts features a Spider-Ham-style parody of the Legion called the Legion of Super-Furries.
- In "The Innocents", a story arc that ran in Garth Ennis' series The Boys #40–43, Wee Hughie is sent to monitor the third-rate superhero team Superduper. Billed in-universe as "teenagers from the future," Superduper includes several superheroes whose powers mimic those of the Legion of Super-Heroes, but who are incompetent: Black Hole (a Matter-Eater Lad analog) chokes on a spoon while trying to eat an ice-cream sundae cup and all; Klanker (Ferro Lad) whose attempts to take on his form of iron usually result in him transforming into inanimate objects; Bobby Ba-Doing (Bouncing Boy) who has the mind of a child and Stool Shadow (Shadow Lass/Phantom Girl), who bumps into walls when trying to phase through them.

== In other media ==
=== Television ===
The Legion of Super-Heroes as they appear in Superman: The Animated Series.

Poster advertising the Legion of Super Heroes animated series.

Alexz Johnson as Imra/Saturn Girl, Calum Worthy as Garth/Lightning Lad, and Ryan Kennedy as Rokk/Cosmic Boy on Smallville.

- The pre-Crisis incarnation of the Legion of Super-Heroes appear in the Superman: The Animated Series episode "New Kids in Town", with Cosmic Boy, Chameleon Boy, and Saturn Girl appearing prominently while Ultra Boy, Phantom Girl, Dream Girl, Lightning Lad, Lightning Lass, Brainiac 5, Triplicate Girl, Bouncing Boy, Kid Quantum, and Andromeda make non-speaking cameo appearances.
- The Legion of Super-Heroes appear in the Justice League Unlimited episode "Far From Home", with Bouncing Boy, Brainiac 5, and later Supergirl appearing as prominent members while Blok, Chameleon Boy, Colossal Boy, Cosmic Boy, Lightning Lad, Phantom Girl, Saturn Girl, Shadow Lass, Timber Wolf, Ultra Boy, and Wildfire make cameo appearances.
- The Legion of Super-Heroes appear in a self-titled animated series, with Bouncing Boy, Brainiac 5, Lightning Lad, Phantom Girl, Saturn Girl, a young Superman, and Timber Wolf appearing as the "core team" in the first season while Cosmic Boy, Colossal Boy, Ferro Lad, Matter-Eater Lad, Triplicate Girl, Shrinking Violet, Blok, Dream Girl, Element Lad, Star Boy, Sun Boy, and Tyroc make minor recurring or cameo appearances. In the second season, Chameleon Boy and a future clone of Superman called Superman X join the Legion.
- The Legion of Super-Heroes appear in the Smallville episode "Legion", with Cosmic Boy, Saturn Girl, Lightning Lad, and later Brainiac 5 appearing prominently.
- The Legion of Super-Heroes appear in the fourth season of Young Justice, with Saturn Girl, Phantom Girl, and Chameleon Boy appearing as prominent members while Brainiac 5 makes a cameo appearance. This version of the group was inspired by Superboy.
- The Legion of Super-Heroes, referred to simply as the Legion, appear in the third season of Supergirl, with Mon-El, Saturn Girl, Brainiac 5, and later Winn Schott as prominent members. This version of the group was inspired by Supergirl.
- In December 2021, it was announced that an adult animated series based on the Legion of Super-Heroes was being developed by Brian Michael Bendis for HBO Max.

=== Film ===
- The Legion of Super-Heroes appear in the Lego DC Comics Super Heroes: Justice League – Cosmic Clash, consisting of Cosmic Boy, Lightning Lad, and Saturn Girl. This version of the group hail from the year 2116, in which Brainiac conquered Earth and killed most of the Legion.
- The Legion of Super-Heroes appear in JLA Adventures: Trapped in Time, with Dawnstar and Karate Kid appearing prominently.
- The Legion of Super-Heroes appear in Justice League vs. the Fatal Five, with Star Boy appearing as a prominent member while Saturn Girl and Brainiac 5 make minor appearances.
- The Legion of Super-Heroes appear in a self-titled film, with Brainiac 5, Bouncing Boy, Arm Fall Off Boy, Invisible Kid, Dawnstar, Chemical King, Triplicate Girl, Phantom Girl, Shadow Lass, and Timber Wolf appearing as prominent members, Supergirl as a student of the Legion Academy, and Mon-El as a double agent secretly working for the Dark Circle. Additionally, numerous Legionnaires make minor non-speaking appearances.

=== Video games ===
- The Legion of Super-Heroes appear as character summons in Scribblenauts Unmasked: A DC Comics Adventure.
- The Legion of Super-Heroes appear in DC Universe Online via the "Long Live the Legion" DLC.
- The Legion of Super-Heroes appear in Brainiac's ending in Injustice 2, with Brainiac 5 appearing prominently while Lightning Lad, Saturn Girl, and Cosmic Boy making non-speaking cameo appearances.

=== Miscellaneous ===
- The Legion of Super-Heroes appear in Justice League Adventures #28.
- The Legion of Super-Heroes appear in Legion of Super Heroes in the 31st Century.
- The Legion of Super-Heroes appear in Smallville Season 11: Continuity.
- The Legion of Super-Heroes appear in the novel trilogy The Flash: Crossover Crisis by Barry Lyga.
