= List of Legion of Super-Heroes enemies =

This is a list of fictional characters from DC Comics who are enemies of the Legion of Super-Heroes.

== Legion of Super-Heroes enemies ==
In alphabetical order (with issue and date of debut appearance).

Villain	First appearance	Description
Black Mace (Mick Yardreigh)	Adventure Comics #374 (November 1968)	A highly trained and super-strong mercenary.
Blight	Legion of Super-Heroes: Secret Files and Origins #2 (June 1999)	An alien race of cybernetic zombies. The Blight travel through space, infesting races they come in contact with.
Chameleon Chief (Jall Tannuz)	Superman's Pal, Jimmy Olsen #63 (September 1962)	A Durlan and member of the Legion of Super-Villains who can transform himself and other objects.
Command Kid (Jeem Rehtu)	Adventure Comics #328 (January 1965)	A resident of Preztor who is possessed by a demon. He infiltrates the Legion of Super-Heroes to destroy them, but is foiled by his weakness to gold.
Composite Man	Legionnaires #25 (May 1995)	A bio-engineered Durlan mutant who mimics the powers of the Legion of Super-Heroes when they arrive to stop his murderous rampage for Legionnaire Chameleon.
Computo	Adventure Comics #340 (January 1966)	A mechanical assistant built by Brainiac 5. Computo sought to wipe out humanity in favor of the rule of machines, proving to be one of the Legion of Super-Heroes' most frequent opponents.
Controller	Adventure Comics #357 (June 1967)	The Controllers are an alien species from another dimension. One Controller, believing true perfection to be derived from chaos, creates a Sun-Eater to attack the universe before the Legion stops him.
Cosmic King (Laevar Bolto)	Superman #147 (August 1961)	A resident of Venus who created a matter-manipulating beam and developed its abilities innately. Shunned by the government, he becomes Cosmic King and a founding member of the Legion of Super-Villains.
Dark Circle	Adventure Comics #367 (April 1968)	A criminal organization founded by five members and consisting of them and their clones. In post-Zero Hour continuity, the group is depicted as a religious movement.
Darkseid	Superman's Pal Jimmy Olsen #134 (December 1970)	The dictator of Apokolips and an old enemy of Superman and the Justice League. After being resurrected in the 30th century, Darkseid battles the Legion. They defeat him, but he kidnaps Lightning Lad and Saturn Girl's son Garridan and transforms him into Validus as revenge.
Doctor Regulus	Adventure Comics #348 (September 1966)	Regulus is a scientist at a nuclear power plant in Metropolis whose experiments were interrupted by Dirk Morgna. Regulus throws Dirk into a nuclear reactor out of anger, which unintentionally gives him solar abilities. Regulus goes into hiding and builds powered armor to seek revenge on Dirk.
Dominators	Adventure Comics #361 (October 1967)	An alien race of scientists ofttimes at odds with Earth. They participated in Earthwar and were part of an alliance against Earth.
Dynamo Boy (Vorm)	Adventure Comics #330 (March 1965)	A space pirate from New Tortuga, Vorm uses a special belt to infiltrate the Legion of Super-Heroes to destroy them from within for the threat they pose to his species's trade. Through circumstances, he managed to expel all members save himself and built a new Legion with three members of the Legion of Super-Villains.
Echo (Myke-4 Astor)	Adventure Comics #355 (April 1967)	A metahuman with the ability to manipulate sound waves.
Esper Lass (Meta Ulnoor)	Superboy Starring the Legion of Super-Heroes #212 (October 1975)	A Titanian with telepathic powers who was denied membership into the Legion for possessing the same powers as Saturn Girl. Subsequently, she becomes a founding member of the Legion of Super-Rejects.
Evillo	Adventure Comics #350 (November 1966)	Prince of the planet Tartarus, Evillo lures criminals to his world with safe haven and siphons their evil to turn innocent people into villains. Creating a group of criminals called the "Devil's Dozen", his gang robbed other planets for him.
Fatal Five	Adventure Comics #352 (January 1967)	A group of five of the greatest criminals in the universe: Emerald Empress, Mano, the Persuader, Tharok, and Validus. They initially meet while helping the Legion battle the Sun-Eater, and decide to remain together afterward.
Firefist	Legion of Super-Heroes (vol. 4) #44 (June 1993)	A Khund who is forced to work with the Legion of Super-Heroes and later betrays them. He is a cyborg and possesses superhuman physical abilities.
Glorith	Adventure Comics #338 (November 1965)	In pre-Crisis continuity, Glorith is an agent of the Time Trapper who he killed for her failure to defeat the Legion of Super-Heroes. Post-Crisis, Glorith becomes a frequent and dangerous enemy of the Legion using her ability to manipulate time.
Grimbor the Chainsman (Markx Grimbor)	Superboy #221 (November 1976)	An inventor and expert in confinement devices, Grimbor is entranced by the mutant Charma Drisden into becoming a criminal after being tasked with capturing her.
Hunter	Adventure Comics #358 (July 1967)	Otto Orion was a master hunter on the planet Simballi who became its ruler. Orion sought to hunt the Legion of Super-Heroes, but was killed in battle. His son Adam sought revenge on the Legion, first alone and later as part of the Legion of Super-Villains.
Infinite Man (Jaxon Rugarth)	Superboy and the Legion of Super-Heroes #233 (November 1977)	Professor Jaxon Rugarth volunteers for a device invented by Rond Vidar intended to send someone forward enough in time to enter the past and prove the theory that the fourth dimension is circular. Rugarth is sent through several dimensions and across time, breaking his mind and turning him into the powerful creature Infinite Man.
Justice League of Earth	Action Comics #859 (January 2008)	Spurned by being rejected for membership into the Legion of Super-Heroes, a group of people led by Earth-Man push the people of Earth into becoming a xenophobic society believing its greatest hero, Superman, was in fact from Earth and protected the world from alien influence. Becoming the Justice League of Earth, the group made the Legion of Super-Heroes into outcasts and hunted by authorities.
Khund	Adventure Comics #346 (July 1966)	A vast empire of warriors and cyborg conquerors.
Laurel Kent	Superboy #217 (June 1976)	Laurel Kent is a student of the Legion Academy who is believed to be a descendant of Superman. She is later revealed to be a Manhunter and self-destructs after her programming activates.
League of Super-Assassins	Superboy and the Legion of Super-Heroes #253 (July 1979)	Believing their planet Dryad was destroyed by the Legion of Super-Heroes, the actual culprit Dark Man (a clone of Tharok) subjected the youths to experiments to give them powers to battle the Legion. Member Blok ended up joining the Legion and his teammates were folded into the Legion of Super-Villains.
Legion of Stupor-Bizarros	Adventure Comics #329 (February 1965)	A group of Bizarro clones of the Legionnaires created by Bizarro's descendant.
Legion of Super-Rejects	Superboy #212 (October 1975)	A group of youths who were rejected from the Legion for having duplicate powers.
Legion of Super-Villains	Superman #147 (August 1961)	First appearing as an adult villainous counterpart of the Legion of Super-Heroes, the group is summoned to the past by Lex Luthor to destroy Superman. The group was later revealed to initially be members of the School of Super-Villains that grew to eventually include most of the Legion's enemies.
Leland McCauley	Adventure Comics #374 (November 1968)	An industrialist and rival of R. J. Brande.
Lex Luthor	Action Comics #23 (April 1940)	Superboy's close friend who became his gravest enemy; when Luthor learned of the Legion of Super-Heroes the group contracted his ire as well, with him facing the group as a teenager and adult.
Lightning Lord (Mekt Ranzz)	Superman #147 (August 1961)	The elder brother of Lightning Lad and Light Lass who gained electric superpowers alongside them after being attacked by Lightning Beasts. After being shunned throughout his life for being an only child, Mekt becomes a criminal and founding member of the Legion of Super-Villains.
Luck Lords	Adventure Comics #343 (April 1966)	The name of two groups. The first is a quartet of alien criminals who were exiled from their world and wield mind-controlling technology. The second is a group of immortal mages.
Mordru	Adventure Comics #369 (June 1968)	Appearing mysteriously on Zerox, Mordru joined their society before seizing power and absorb the power of many of their wizards. He began conquering neighboring worlds, forming an extensive empire that spans half a galaxy. Deciding to begin being more selective with what worlds he would snatch up, Earth would catch his eye and he would battle the Legion of Super-Heroes, becoming one of the group's most frequent adversaries.
Nemesis Kid	Adventure Comics #346 (July 1966)	An undercover agent of the Khunds with the ability to develop whatever power is necessary to defeat his opponent.
Omega	Superboy and the Legion of Super-Heroes #250 (April 1979)	Created by a mad Brainiac 5 to destroy the universe, the Miracle Machine took the combined hatred of the universe and gave it form in Omega.
Pulsar Stargrave	Superboy #223 (January 1977)	A Coluan who claims to be Brainiac resurrected and imbued with stellar energy.
Ra's al Ghul	Batman #232 (June 1971)	An old enemy of Batman who possesses immortality derived from the Lazarus Pits. In the 31st century, he kills United Planets president Leland McCauley and takes his place, ordering that the Legion of Super-Heroes were outlaws. By this time, Ra's had become one with the Lazarus Pits' fire and could inhabit one of many clones made of himself.
Roxxas	Adventure Comics #307 (April 1963)	A space pirate who massacred the Trommites when they refused to use their ability to transmute elements to avast a fortune. The sole survivor, Jan Arrah, joins the Legion of Super-Heroes as Element Lad.
Saturn Queen (Eve Aries)	Superman #147 (August 1961)	A Titanian and founding member of the Legion of Super-Villains.
School for Super-Villains	Adventure Comics #371 (August 1968)	A school for supervillains founded by Tarik the Mute.
Sklarian Raiders	Superboy and the Legion of Super-Heroes #233 (November 1977)	An all-female band of space pirates.
Spider Girl	Adventure Comics #310 (July 1963)	A rejected Legionnaire applicant and member of the Legion of Super-Villains who possesses prehensile hair.
Starfinger	Adventure Comics #335 (August 1965)	Originally, Starfinger is an alternate identity of Lightning Lad, who was mind-controlled by Lars Hanscom. Later, criminal Char Burrane and Lars' brother Molock Hanscom obtain a set of alien rings and take on the Starfinger mantle.
Storm Boy (Myke Chypurz)	Adventure Comics #301 (October 1962)	A member of the Legion of Super-Villains who was rejected from the Legion of Super-Heroes after they discovered that his weather-manipulating abilities are derived from a hidden device and are not natural.
Sun Emperor (Nigal Douglous)	Superboy #208 (April 1975)	A criminal and member of the Legion of Super-Villains who gained the ability to manipulate solar energy after participating in a genetic experiment.
Superboy-Prime	DC Comics Presents #87 (November 1985)	An alternate universe version of Superman. He battles the Legion after being sent to the 31st century by the Time Trapper, who is later revealed to be his future self.
Tarik the Mute (Benno Tarik)	Adventure Comics #372 (September 1968)	During a fire fight between criminals and the Science Police, an innocent bystander named Tarik was struck by one of the officers' laser blasts. Rendered mute, Tarik came to despise the law and formed a school to train criminals so far to force Colossal Boy to become an instructor under threat of murdering his parents. Tarik's students would go on to found the Legion of Super-Villains.
Time Trapper	Adventure Comics #317 (February 1964)	A powerful, time-manipulating entity who resides at the end of time. Because of his ever-changing nature, he has had several identities, including his assistant Glorith, a Controller, Cosmic Boy, the young girl Lori Morning, and Superboy-Prime.
Tyr	Superboy #197 (September 1973)	An alien from the planet Tyrraz and a member of the Legion of Super-Villains. He wields a bionic gun in place of his right arm.
Universo	Adventure Comics #349 (October 1966)	A former Green Lantern who was stripped of his power ring after attempting to view the beginning of the universe.
Vandal Savage	Green Lantern #10 (Winter 1943)	A Cro-Magnon who gained immortality after being exposed to a radioactive meteor. He has battled various heroes, including the Legion of Super-Heroes.
White Triangle	Legion of Super-Heroes (vol. 4) #66 (March 1995)	A xenophobic group of Daxamites who view other races as inferior and plot to destroy the United Planets due to its goal of uniting different races.
Workforce	Legion of Super-Heroes (vol. 4) #64 (January 1995)	A group of superpowered youths formed by Leland McCauley to rival his enemy R. J. Brande's Legion of Super-Heroes. The Workforce members later abandon McCauley to become real heroes.

== In other media ==
Villain	First appearance	Description
Alexis	Legion of Super Heroes: "Legacy"	A wealthy girl who is implied to be related to Lex Luthor. She befriends Superman but becomes jealous after he prioritizes his duties with the Legion over her, wishing to eliminate the Legion as she believes they are getting between them.
Drax	Legion of Super Heroes: "Phantoms"	A genetically-engineered Kryptonian who was created by the inmates of the Phantom Zone, and seeks to free them from imprisonment.
Imperiex	Legion of Super Heroes: "The Man from the Edge of Tomorrow"	A conqueror from the 41st century, who comes into conflict with the Legion after Superman's clone, Superman X (who was created to fight against Imperiex's rule) travels back in time to gain the Legion's assistance in defeating him.
Legion of Super-Villains	Legion of Super Heroes: "Lightning Storm"	A group of extortionists and assassins who initially pretend to be heroes under the name "Light-Speed Vanguard" before being exposed. They are initially led by Lightning Lord, and later by Tyr.
Terra-Man	Legion of Super Heroes: "Unnatural Alliances"	An android from the 41st century resembling a cowboy who was created by the robot K3NT and sent back in time to the 31st century to kill the boy Abel, who would grow up to create the technology used by Imperiex. In doing so, Terra-Man would prevent Imperiex's rise to power.
Zyx	Legion of Super Heroes: "Child's Play"	A mischievous young sorcerer from the planet Zerox. He is initially an enemy of the Legion, but later reforms.

== See also ==
- List of Superman enemies
