= Ol-Vir =

- Ol-Vir as depicted in Final Crisis: Legion of 3 Worlds #3 (April 2009). Art by George Pérez (penciller), Scott Koblish (inker), and Hi-Fi Design (colorist).

Publication information
- Publisher: DC Comics
- First appearance: Legion of Super-Heroes (vol. 2) #294 (December 1982)
- Created by: Paul Levitz; Keith Giffen

In-story information
- Alter ego: Ol-Vir
- Species: Daxamite
- Place of origin: Daxam (31st century)
- Team affiliations: Legion of Super-Villains
- Abilities: Powers and abilities identical to those of Superman (superhuman strength, super speed, flight, stamina and freezing breath, super hearing, multiple extrasensory and vision powers, and longevity)

Ol-Vir is a supervillain appearing in media published by DC Comics. He first appeared in Legion of Super-Heroes (vol. 2) #294 (December 1982), and is often depicted as a member of the Legion of Super-Villains.

== Fictional character biography ==
In the 30th century, Darkseid steals the abilities of Mordru and the Time Trapper, using them to enthrall the entire population of the planet Daxam. He then transports Daxam to a star system with a yellow sun, giving all of the Daxamites powers equivalent to those of Superman. The enslaved Daxamites wreak havoc throughout United Planets territory, with one of them – a child named Ol-Vir – attacking the prison planet Takron-Galtos. Legion of Super-Heroes member Chameleon Boy contains Ol-Vir by placing him into a cell with Validus. The Legion engages Darkseid in battle, eventually causing him to lose his control over the Daxamites and retreat.

Sometime later, Nemesis Kid leads the Legion of Super-Villains in a coordinated assault on the Legion of Super-Heroes. Ol-Vir leads Validus in an attack upon the Legion, persuading the monster to destroy married Legionnaires Lightning Lad and Saturn Girl. During this battle, Saturn Girl realizes that Validus is her son Garridan, who was secretly stolen at birth and transformed by Darkseid. (Note: As depicted in Legion of Super-Heroes (vol. 2) Annual #3 (1984)) Disgusted by Ol-Vir's failure, Darkseid kills him. Out of respect for Saturn Girl's strength of will, Darkseid restores Validus to his normal form.

Ol-Vir is resurrected following the Infinite Crisis event, which restores an analogue of the Legion's original continuity. Now an adult, he participates in a massive assault on the Legion by Superboy-Prime and the Legion of Super-Villains.

== Powers and abilities ==
Generally, the abilities of Ol-Vir (and other Daxamites) are identical to those of Superman and other Kryptonians (super-strength; speed; flight; x-ray, heat, microscopic and telescopic vision powers; invulnerability and super hearing). However, they are vulnerable to lead rather than Kryptonite.
