= One of Us Is a Traitor =

Comic story arc featuring the Legion of Super-Heroes

- Publisher: DC Comics
- Publication date: July – August 1966
- Genre: Science fiction, superhero
- Title(s): Adventure Comics #346-347
- Main character(s): Legion of Super-Heroes; Khunds

Creative team
- Writer: Jim Shooter
- Penciller(s): Curt Swan; Jim Shooter
- Inker(s): George Klein; Sheldon Moldoff
- Editor: Mort Weisinger

"One of Us Is a Traitor" is a story arc that was published by DC Comics, and presented in Adventure Comics #346-347 (July–August 1966). It was written by Jim Shooter (who was 14 years old at the time), with pencils by Shooter and Curt Swan. The story arc features the first appearance of the Khunds and four new members of the Legion of Super-Heroes, one of whom is revealed to be a traitor.

== Plot summary ==
After saving a construction worker from falling to his death, Cosmic Boy arrives at a scheduled meeting of the Legion of Super-Heroes. The team holds membership tryouts and inducts four new Legionnaires onto the team: Princess Projectra of the planet Orando, who possesses the power to project illusions; Nemesis Kid of the alchemists' planet Myar, who can develop superpowers to defeat any opponent; Ferro Lad of Earth, a mutant who can transform his body into solid iron; and Karate Kid, whose expertise in hand-to-hand combat allows him to battle Superboy to a near-standstill. Soon thereafter, the Legionnaires are being briefed about a newly discovered civilization in a distant galaxy. The planet is called Khund, (Note: In subsequent stories, the planet is referred to as Khundia.) and its warlord Garlak sends the Legion a message: Earth is to surrender in one hour or be destroyed. Concerned that the Khunds might have spies in the United Planets, Superboy sends groups of Legionnaires to guard three electro-towers located across Earth — unaware that the Khunds have already planted a spy within the Legion.

When a Khundian ship attacks the Alaskan Electro-Tower, Karate Kid suggests that Phantom Girl investigate. The ship explodes and nearly kills her, and Karate Kid is found unconscious at the site of the tower, which has been destroyed. When it appears that the tower arsenal vault was breached by someone using karate blows, Phantom Girl suspects that the culprit is Karate Kid — particularly after learning that he volunteered to guard the vault. Superboy leads a square of Legionnaires to the Tierra del Fuego Electro-Tower, where they repel an attack from a Khundian raiding party, but are shocked when the tower is suddenly destroyed by a bolt from the third tower in Ceylon. (Note: This story was written in 1966. In 1972, the nation of Ceylon changed its name to Sri Lanka.) Speeding to Ceylon, the team finds that the last tower has been destroyed and that Karate Kid is missing.

The last weapons remaining on Earth with the power to repel an alien attack are in the Legion's arsenal. The team races back to the Legion Clubhouse, where they discover Karate Kid at the arsenal and all of the weapons destroyed. Before Karate Kid can proclaim his innocence, Nemesis Kid appears from behind a storage tank and confesses to being the spy; he had incorrectly believed that Superboy was talking to him when he said "Kid". Suddenly, a fourth electro-tower rises from the ground and destroys the invading Khundian fleet. Superboy reveals that, after the first attack, he built a dummy tower in South America and hid the real one. When some of the Khundian ships survive the blast from the tower, the Legionnaires board jet platforms to defend the planet. The team defeats this last attack wave, with Karate Kid capturing the Khundian flagship containing Garlak. Later, Nemesis Kid — unable to defeat multiple foes at once — teleports away. Superboy notes that Nemesis Kid had been one of the most powerful members ever, and laments the loss of a potentially great Legionnaire.

== Aftermath ==
Tragedy subsequently befalls each of the four Legionnaires inducted in this story arc. Ferro Lad sacrifices himself to save the Milky Way Galaxy from the Sun-Eater. Years later, Projectra becomes Queen of Orando and takes Karate Kid as her consort, (Note: Projectra becomes queen in Legion of Super-Heroes vol. 2, #288 (June 1982), and marries Karate Kid in Legion of Super-Heroes vol. 2, Annual #2 (1983).) but he is killed defending the planet from an invasion by Nemesis Kid and the Legion of Super-Villains. Projectra then executes Nemesis Kid in combat. Grieving her loss, Projectra rejoins the Legion as Sensor Girl, (Note: Sensor Girl joined the team in Legion of Super-Heroes vol. 3, #14 (September 1985), but the fact that she is Projectra remained hidden until Legion of Super-Heroes vol. 3, #25 (August 1986).) later renouncing the throne of Orando.
