= The Universo Project =

1987 DC Comics story arc

- Publisher: DC Comics
- Publication date: March – June 1987
- Genre: Science fiction, superhero
- Title(s): Legion of Super-Heroes vol. 3, #32-35
- Main character(s): Legion of Super-Heroes; Universo; Zymyr; Dominators

Creative team
- Writer: Paul Levitz
- Penciller: Greg LaRocque
- Inker: Mike DeCarlo
- Editor: Karen Berger

"The Universo Project" is a story arc that was published by DC Comics, and presented in Legion of Super-Heroes vol. 3, #32-35 (March–June 1987). It was written by Paul Levitz and pencilled by Greg LaRocque. In the story arc, the supervillain Universo manages to enthrall everyone of Earth, conquering the planet — leaving only four members of the Legion of Super-Heroes with any chance of defeating him.

== Plot ==
Legion of Super-Heroes co-founder Saturn Girl — who recently resigned to spend time with her family — awakens to find herself in the barracks of a working farm on an unfamiliar planet. (Note: All three of the founding Legionnaires resigned from active duty in Legion of Super-Heroes vol. 3, #12 (July 1985).) Everyone that she finds it is mind-blocked and controlled, restrictions that she was able to break due to her mental abilities as a native of Titan. Additionally, she soon realizes that the workers imprisoned with her are all superheroes or Science Police officers. Among them are three of her fellow Legionnaires: Chameleon Boy, Dream Girl, and Brainiac 5. After several days have passed, she manages to break the mental blocks on her teammates. Meanwhile, Mon-El, Ultra Boy and Blok accompany United Planets ambassador Relnic on a diplomatic mission to extend the treaty with the Dominators. They are shocked when warships greet them. On Tellus' homeworld Hykraius, he and teammates Wildfire, Quislet, and White Witch search for Xanthu's missing champion, Atmos. (Note: After Atmos was reported missing, the government of Xanthus ordered Star Boy to replace him as planetary champion. – Legion of Super-Heroes vol. 3, #28 (November 1986)) On Earth, the planetary government seizes Legion Headquarters' control on the orders of Earth President Mojai Desai. No one is aware that Desai is under the control of the Legion's longtime enemy Universo. The villain is pleased that he has taken complete control of Earth, even though he apparently killed his son Rond Vidar to ensure that his plan would succeed. (Note: Rond Vidar is immune to Universo's powers of super-hypnotism. – Adventure Comics #360 (September 1967)) (Note: Brainiac 5 was notified about Rond Vidar's supposed death in Legion of Super-Heroes vol. 3, #30 (January 1987), but was later revealed that Vidar is a member of the Green Lantern Corps and that his power ring allowed him to survive Universo's attack. – Legion of Super-Heroes vol. 3, #49-50 (August–September 1988))

In space, the Dominators are convinced that Relnic and the U.P. officials are not interested in diplomacy and open fire on his ship. The attack is repelled by Mon-El, Ultra Boy, and Blok, but then Relnic's ship inexplicably begins to fire on them. On Earth, Universo — who has been posing as presidential aide Vid-Gupta — continues to manipulate Desai. Meanwhile, the Legionnaires on the work farm planet manage to counteract the chemicals which have kept the heroes under mental control. The heroes — which include Gas Girl (of the Heroes of Lallor) and Atmos — destroy the robotic machines which have helped to keep them imprisoned. Using their respective powers, they escape the planet, with the Legionnaires determined to locate their unknown jailer.

On Hykraius, Zymyr manages to capture Wildfire, Quislet, Tellus, and the White Witch. He then advises Universo, with whom he has been conspiring, that his plan to isolate "the most dangerous Legionnaires" off-planet is failing. (Note: Chameleon Boy theorized that Dream Girl, Saturn Girl, and Brainiac 5 were sent to the unknown planet because they were the "smartest Legionnaires". Dream Girl later reached a different conclusion, that they were the Legionnaires with the strongest willpower.) Universo is confident that he can handle any of them should they reach Earth. Meanwhile, Saturn Girl, Chameleon Boy, Dream Girl, and Brainiac 5 reach Naltor, Dream Girl's homeworld. The High Seer informs that Earth has disbanded the Legion and shut down almost all communication with other planets. The four Legionnaires attempt to return to Earth in disguise via mass transit, but Chameleon Boy is detected, and the group is forced to steal a cruiser. Upon reaching orbit over Earth, they are attacked by the Science Police, and the cruiser crashes. The Legionnaires realize that they are now outlaws on Earth. Remembering the last time that the entire Legion was turned into outlaws, the four of them finally deduce that the mastermind behind their current predicament is the same person who conquered Earth and disbanded the Legion once before: Universo. (Note: Years earlier, Universo enthralled and conquered the people of Earth while disguised as President Kandro Boltax. – Adventure Comics #359-360 (August–September 1967))

After probing the mind of a Science Police officer, the Legionnaires learn that Universo managed to put Earth's populace to sleep at once, making them susceptible to suggestion. Desai blamed the phenomenon on an alien sleeping plague and began instituting changes that eventually resulted in the Legion's disbanding and the isolation of Earth. Convinced that Desai is Universo, the Legionnaires storm the Presidential Palace in Metropolis. Upon finding him, they realize that he is a pawn and has been enthralled like the others. When a group of their hypnotized teammates attacks, Chameleon Boy, Dream Girl, and Brainiac 5 fend them off. Eventually, they are overwhelmed by their comrades' superior numbers and defeated. Meanwhile, Saturn Girl searches for Universo on her own. After consulting former President Marte Allon (Colossal Boy's mother), Saturn Girl correctly determines that Universo has been posing as Vid-Gupta. Although the villain is using Mon-El and Ultra Boy as his personal bodyguards, Saturn Girl can mentally overwhelm them - and eventually Universo as well. She seizes his hypnotic medallion, the key to freeing the others from his mental control. Later, Desai revokes all regulations and presidential edicts issued while under Universo's control. The Legion reforms and Saturn Girl returns to active duty.

== Post-Infinite Crisis ==
In the aftermath of the Infinite Crisis miniseries, most of the Legion's original continuity has been restored. (Note: The restoration of the original continuity was confirmed in the "Lightning Saga" and "Superman and the Legion of Super-Heroes" story arcs.)
