= Emerald Empress =

DC Comics supervillain

- Emerald Empress as depicted in Supergirl #8 (2017); art by Emanuela Lupacchino (penciler), Ray McCarthy (inker), and Hi-Fi Design (colorists).

Publication information
- Publisher: DC Comics
- First appearance: (Sarya); Adventure Comics #352 (January 1967) (Kesh); Legionnaires #2 (Falyce); Legion of Super-Heroes (vol. 6) Annual #1
- Created by: (Sarya); Jim Shooter; Curt Swan

In-story information
- Alter ego: Sarya of Venegar; Cera Kesh; Falyce
- Species: Venegarian (Sarya)
- Place of origin: Venegar (Sarya); Orando (Falyce)
- Team affiliations: Fatal Five; Legion of Super-Villains; Suicide Squad
- Partnerships: Mordru
- Notable aliases: Empress
- Abilities: [Universal]: Through the Emerald Eye of Ekron, all versions of the Emerald Empress possess its nearly unlimited power to utilize abilities such as flight, energy projection, retain youth, etc. The artifact can also enhance a user's normal abilities.; [Sarya]: Above average superhuman strength; [Cera Kesh]: Telekinesis

The Emerald Empress is the name of several supervillains appearing American comic books published by DC Comics, primarily as enemies of the Legion of Super-Heroes. The first incarnation of the character appeared in Adventure Comics #352 (January 1967).

The first and mainstream version of the character is Sarya, who discovered the Emerald Eye of Ekron on the planet Venegar and became a villain after being corrupted by its influence. Sarya turned to a life of piracy and began to gain a following before later founding the Fatal Five and becoming an enemy of the Legion of Super-Heroes. The second incarnation of the character, Cera Kesh, is a teenaged fan of the Legion of Super-Heroes who auditioned to be a part of the team, only to be rejected. Sensing her anger and jealousy, the Emerald Eye of Ekron corrupts her into the second Emerald Empress, granting her both powers and the ability to become an idealized version of herself. The third incarnation of the character, Falyce, is a native of the planet Orando and victim of the planet's duke. Wishing for the power to slay her torturer, the Emerald Eye of Ekron makes the third Emerald Empress but drives her insane.

== Fictional biographies ==
=== Sarya ===
Sarya of the planet Venegar (referred to simply as 'the Empress') is one of several criminals recruited by Superboy and the Legion to combat the menace of the Sun-Eater. Once the Sun-Eater is defeated, Sarya forms the Fatal Five with Tharok, Validus, Mano, and the Persuader.

The Emerald Empress dies when, at her request, Legionnaire Sensor Girl uses her powers of illusion to mask Sarya's presence from the Emerald Eye of Ekron. As the Empress decays, she expresses relief to be free from the Eye's control, indicating that their symbiosis was unwilling and that the Empress was far older than she appeared.

During Final Crisis, the Emerald Empress appears as a member of Superboy-Prime's Legion of Super-Villains.

In DC Rebirth, the Emerald Empress appears as a member of the Suicide Squad alongside Lobo, Johnny Sorrow, and Doctor Polaris. The Empress is manipulated by Amanda Waller by potential information about Saturn Girl. When their first mission ends in disaster, Empress and the others are imprisoned. They are later freed by Lord as part of his own plan for domination.

=== Cera Kesh ===
Cera Kesh first appears in Legionnaires #2, where she attempts to join the Legion of Super-Heroes using her innate telekinesis, but is mocked by Inferno for her appearance. Kesh flees and discovers the Emerald Eye of Ekron, which she uses to transform into her ideal self. Succumbing to the Eye's influence, Kesh becomes a criminal and member of the Fatal Five. At the same time, Leland McCauley finds a second Emerald Eye, with which he intends to turn Ingria Olav into the new Emerald Empress. Instead, Kesh kills Olav and gains the power of both Eyes.

=== Ingria Olav ===
Ingria Olav is the girlfriend of Legion of Super-Heroes enemy Leland McCauley. Having discovered a second Eye of Ekron, McCauley forms a new Fatal Five, with Olav serving as the Emerald Empress. However, Olav proves to be cowardly and an unskilled user of the Eye of Ekron. She is later tracked down by Cera Kesh, the other Emerald Empress, who kills her and takes the second Eye for herself.

=== Empress ===
Following Zero Hour: Crisis in Time!, which reboots the Legion's continuity, a character simply called the 'Empress' is introduced. This version is a sadistic killer who initially lacks powers before obtaining the Emerald Eye of Ekron.

=== Falyce ===
In Legion of Super-Heroes (vol. 6) Annual #1 (2011), the Eye finds a new Empress on the planet Orando. This young girl fights Shrinking Violet, Light Lass, Sun Boy, Sensor Girl, and Gates of the Legion before being defeated by Violet. The girl is released from the control of the Eye, who flees.

== Powers and abilities ==
=== Standalone abilities ===
The first incarnation of the Emerald Empress, Sarya, possessed limited independent abilities, possessing greater than average human strength, a trait possessed by inhabitants of Venagar. Much of her abilities are centered upon the Emerald Eye of Ekron, in which she controls through her own mind and willpower. Having a symbiotic relationship with the artifact, she draws power from it while the Eye draws focus and both are more powerful the closer they are.

Cera Kesh, the second incarnation of the Emerald Empress, possessed telekinesis.

=== Emerald Eye of Ekron ===
Starfire wielding the Emerald Eye in 52

Each user of the Emerald Eye of Ekron gains access to its nearly unlimited levels of emerald/willpower energies, the same power source used by the Green Lantern Corps. The Emerald Eye was once depicted as the disembodied eye of Ekron, a member of the Green Lantern Corps who was driven insane after Lady Styx devastated his sector of space.

The Eye is virtually indestructible and obeys its user's mental commands. Its powers allow it to project powerful energy blasts, generate force fields to protect from attacks, see through every spectrum and wavelength, create energy constructs, hypnotize others, cast illusions, teleport people over short distances, and alter reality, like how Falyce rebuilt the planet Orando into a medieval-like society as she envisioned it. It can also grants its users the ability to fly and survive in space, superhuman strength, increase their size, enhance the innate skills of its current user, and turn them into ideal versions of themselves.

== Reception ==
Emerald Empress was ranked 38th in Comics Buyer's Guide's "100 Sexiest Women in Comics" list. Russ Burlingame of Comicbook.com described her as "a big player in the DC Universe of late" and that "she's one of the most identifiable Legion villains, with a cool gimmick and a great visual" noting her appearance in Justice League vs. Suicide Squad and in a crossover story between Supergirl and Batgirl.

== In other media ==
=== Television ===
Emerald Empress as she appears in Legion of Super-Heroes

- The Sarya incarnation of the Emerald Empress appears in the Justice League Unlimited episode "Far from Home", voiced by Joanne Whalley.
- The Sarya incarnation of the Emerald Empress appears in Legion of Super Heroes, voiced by Jennifer Hale in the first season and Tara Strong in the second. This version is a member of the Fatal Five who is eventually abandoned by them in the second season after Matter-Eater Lad destroys the Emerald Eye of Ekron.
- An original incarnation of Emerald Empress appears in Young Justice, voiced by Vanessa Marshall. This version is Ursa Zod, who obtained the Emerald Eye of Ekron after her son Lor-Zod stole it from Metron's vault.

=== Film ===
- An unidentified Emerald Empress makes a cameo appearance in Justice League: The New Frontier.
- The Sarya incarnation of the Emerald Empress appears in Justice League vs. the Fatal Five, voiced by Sumalee Montano. This version is the lover of Mano who is ultimately killed in battle by Jessica Cruz.

=== Video games ===
The Sarya incarnation of Emerald Empress appears as a character summon in Scribblenauts Unmasked: A DC Comics Adventure.

=== Miscellaneous ===
The Sarya incarnation of Emerald Empress appears in Legion of Super Heroes in the 31st Century.
