= Jessica Cruz =

DC Comics character

- Jessica Cruz as depicted on a variant cover of Green Lanterns #1 (August 2016). Art by Emanuela Lupacchino.

Publication information
- Publisher: DC Comics
- First appearance: Cameo appearance: Green Lantern #20 (July 2013); Cameo appearance proper: Justice League #30 (July 2014); Full appearance: Justice League #31 (August 2014)
- Created by: Geoff Johns; Ethan Van Sciver

In-story information
- Full name: Jessica Viviana Cruz
- Species: Human
- Team affiliations: Green Lantern Corps; Justice League; Justice League Odyssey
- Partnerships: Simon Baz; Batman; Emilia Harcourt
- Notable aliases: Green Lantern; Power Ring
- Abilities: Use of power ring grants: Flight; Force field generation; Generation of hard-light constructs; Real-time translation of all languages; Space & time travel; Energy twin projection & absorption; Material & mind alteration; Holographic projection; Phasing; Emerald sight; Environmental playback; Will empowerment; Invisibility and Light Refraction; Wormholes and spatial warps; Limited cellular regeneration; Electromagnetic scanning; Galactic Encyclopedia; Ring duplication; Emergency homing beacon; Pocket dimensions; Resurrection; Security protocol; Preset conditions; Thought relay

Jessica Cruz, one of the characters known as Green Lantern, is a superheroine appearing in American comic books published by DC Comics. Created by Geoff Johns and Ethan Van Sciver, she is a member of the Green Lantern Corps and Justice League, as well as the first female Earth Green Lantern. Her first full appearance takes place in Justice League (vol. 2) #31 (August 2014), which is also her first cover appearance. Cruz currently operates out of Portland, Oregon.

Jessica Cruz has appeared in various media outside comics, including television and films. Myrna Velasco, Cristina Milizia, Dascha Polanco, Jeannie Tirado, Diane Guerrero, and Auliʻi Cravalho have voiced the character in animation.

== Publication history ==
Jessica Cruz's name is mentioned and her right hand appears briefly in a single panel of the 2013 issue Green Lantern #20. Her next appearance comes in Justice League (vol. 2) #30, when the Ring of Volthoom locates her, and she then gains her powers in the following issue. She was dubbed "Power Ring" while she was host to the Ring of Volthoom but is not a member of Crime Syndicate of America. Jessica becomes an official member of the Green Lantern Corps, in the Prime Earth reality, at the end of The Darkseid War storyline.

== Fictional character biography ==
=== The New 52 ===
Jessica Cruz and her friends were on a hunting trip when they accidentally stumble across two men burying a body. The men brutally murder her friends, and Jessica manages to escape, but is left severely traumatized. The Ring of Volthoom, which feeds off fear and had abandoned Power Ring after his death during the Crime Syndicate's incursion to Prime Earth, is able to locate her due to her trauma. Unlike the previous ring bearers, she does not willingly accept the ring, but is forced to accept it. The Ring tortures Jessica with physical and psychological pain. The Ring explains that it is using Jessica to attract the being that destroyed Earth-Three to Prime Earth because he is dying (for reasons not explained) and wants to take the planet with him.

First full appearance and first cover appearance of Jessica Cruz

Batman, sent to stop Jessica from unleashing violence and terror, de-powers the ring after convincing Jessica to face her fears and thereby eliminate the emotional weaknesses that allow Volthoom to dominate her. During the AMAZO Virus arc, Jessica succumbs to the effects of the virus, but is cured after Superman creates an antidote. Hal Jordan agrees to teach Jessica how to wield her ring in the service of good.

When Darkseid's daughter Grail arrives on Prime Earth, she attacks Jessica and uses her ring to open a portal to Earth-Three, allowing the Anti-Monitor to cross over. Jessica and the rest of the Justice League are then transported away by Metron. After this, the Justice League decides to free the Crime Syndicate to help in the fight against the Anti-Monitor and Grail. Jessica, Cyborg and Mister Miracle head to the prison and the close proximity to the Syndicate allows the Ring to possess Jessica. During the Justice League's confrontation against Grail and Darkseid, Grail manages to separate the Flash from the Black Racer, which immediately begins to pursue the Flash. Realizing the Racer will not leave the physical plane of existence until it reaps a soul, Jessica convinces Cyborg to tap into the ring's technology and override Volthoom's control over Jessica's body for a few seconds. This lets Jessica jump between Flash and the Black Racer, allowing the Black Racer to apparently kill her. Jessica survives, and it is revealed that the Black Racer killed Volthoom instead, causing Jessica's ring to crumble into dust. Immediately afterwards, a Green Lantern ring descends at the battlefield and transforms Jessica into a new Green Lantern.

=== DC Rebirth ===
In Green Lanterns: Rebirth #1, Jessica meets Simon Baz as he is investigating an intrusion by a Manhunter. The events are revealed to be a training exercise run by Hal Jordan to test the two as a team. He proceeds to combine Jessica and Simon's power batteries to make them work together as partners and puts them in charge of protecting Earth, also giving them membership to the Justice League.

When confronting the threat of the Phantom Ring, a prototype power ring that can channel the entirety of the emotional spectrum at the cost of rapidly shifting depending on the emotional state of the user, Jessica confesses to her own doubts about whether she deserves her ring given the unconventional circumstances of her recruitment. However, her fears are assuaged when she temporarily dons the Phantom Ring and it automatically transforms her into a Green Lantern, allowing Jessica to recognize her success at overcoming her old fears rather than believing that she was defined by that experience.

Jessica is sent to space to train with the Green Lantern Corps and is under the orders of Guy Gardner, who pushes her around and berates her. However, he agrees to keep the events secret after she defeats him in combat.

Jessica is assigned to monitor the Ghost Sector, a region consisting of recovered planets stolen by Coluans. While there, she encounters Cyborg, Starfire, and Azrael piloting a skullship commandeered from Brainiac in an attempt to enter the sector. Attempting to stop them, she finds herself trapped in the Ghost Sector alongside the others, and they work together to investigate the mysterious region of space as Justice League Odyssey.

== Powers and abilities ==
As a Green Lantern, Jessica is capable of projecting energy-based constructions, flight, and utilizing various other abilities through her power ring which are only limited by her imagination and willpower. Jessica's signature constructs are massive, intricate structures with an organic appearance similar to a giant alien flower. She initially experienced some trouble in creating constructs with the ring, requiring a period of intense concentration to generate larger constructs, but overcame this limitation while training with Simon Baz.

While Jessica was briefly a Power Ring, she initially had no control over the ring. Under the tutelage of Hal Jordan, she learns to overcome the evil powers within the Ring and use it effectively until Volthoom possesses her body. Her feelings of courage help Cyborg decipher the alien language of the ring, and he is able to let her overcome Volthoom's influence for a moment and jump between Black Racer and the Flash which ends up destroying Volthoom and the Ring, freeing Jessica.

Jessica is also an adept survivalist and was able to live by herself for three years. She was seen wielding a shotgun with proficiency when she was able to hit the Ring of Volthoom and keep it at bay for a few moments before it made her its host.

Jessica's ring is partly fused with Volthoom's Travel Lantern, due to it being one of the first seven power rings created by the rogue Guardian Rami during Volthoom's first attack on Oa, ten billion years ago. It was the Travel Lantern that allowed Volthoom to make his initial journey to the past, and Jessica's ring connection to it also resulted in Jessica accidentally using the ring to send herself and Simon into the past to escape Volthoom, only to find themselves at the time of Volthoom's assault on Oa.

== In other media ==
=== Television ===
- Jessica Cruz appears in DC Super Hero Girls (2019), voiced by Myrna Velasco. This version does not appear to suffer from past trauma, lives with a lesbian couple, and is a pacifist, vegetarian, animal rights activist, and environmentalist who becomes friends with Pam Isley.
- Jessica Cruz appears in Teen Titans Go!, voiced again by Myrna Velasco.
- Jessica Cruz appears in the My Adventures with Superman episode "Mobile Suit Toyman", voiced by Auliʻi Cravalho. She is seen attending Super Con and praising Supergirl during her interview with Cat Grant.
  - Jessica Cruz will lead the spinoff series My Adventures with Green Lantern, voiced again by Auliʻi Cravalho.

=== Film ===
- Jessica Cruz appears in Lego DC Super Hero Girls: Super-Villain High, voiced by Cristina Milizia.
- Jessica Cruz appears in Lego DC Comics Super Heroes: Aquaman – Rage of Atlantis, voiced again by Cristina Milizia. This version is a member of the Justice League.
- Jessica Cruz appears in Justice League vs. the Fatal Five, voiced by Diane Guerrero. While suffering from various traumas, such as her agoraphobia, she is targeted by Mano, Tharok, and Persuader of the Fatal Five, who seek to use her to free Emerald Empress and Validus from prison on Oa. After bonding with Star Boy, who also has mental illness, Cruz defeats the Fatal Five and joins the Justice League.
- Jessica Cruz appears in Lego DC Shazam! Magic and Monsters, voiced again by Cristina Milizia.
- Jessica Cruz appears in Teen Titans Go! & DC Super Hero Girls: Mayhem in the Multiverse, voiced again by Myrna Velasco.
- Jessica Cruz appears in DC League of Super-Pets, voiced by Dascha Polanco. This version is a member of the Justice League who later adopts Chip.
- Jessica Cruz appears in Justice League x RWBY: Super Heroes & Huntsmen, voiced by Jeannie Tirado. This version is a member of the Justice League.
- Jessica Cruz appears in Batman Ninja vs. Yakuza League, voiced by Ayane Sakura in Japanese and Annie Wild in English.

=== Video games ===
- Jessica Cruz appears as a character summon in Scribblenauts Unmasked: A DC Comics Adventure.
- Jessica Cruz appears as a playable character in the mobile version of Injustice: Gods Among Us.
- Jessica Cruz appears as a playable character in DC Legends.
- Jessica Cruz appears as an unlockable playable character in Lego DC Super-Villains.
- Jessica Cruz appears in DC Super Hero Girls: Teen Power, voiced again by Myrna Velasco.

=== Miscellaneous ===
- Jessica Cruz appears in DC Super Hero Girls (2015), voiced by Cristina Milizia. This version is Lois Lane's shy camerawoman who later succeeds Hal Jordan as Earth's Green Lantern.
- Jessica Cruz appears as a playable character in DC Deck-Building Game: Rebirth.
