= Princess Projectra =

DC Comics character

- Princess Projectra as depicted in Legion of Super-Heroes (vol. 5) #6 (2005). Art by Barry Kitson.

Publication information
- Publisher: DC Comics
- First appearance: As Princess Projectra: Adventure Comics #346 (July 1966); As Sensor Girl: Legion of Super-Heroes (vol. 3) #14 (September 1985)
- Created by: Jim Shooter

In-story information
- Full name: Projectra (pre-Zero Hour); Wilimena Morgana Daergina Annaxandra Projectra Velorya Vauxhall (Threeboot Legion)
- Species: Orandan
- Place of origin: Orando
- Team affiliations: Legion of Super-Heroes
- Notable aliases: Queen Projectra, Sensor Girl
- Abilities: Illusion generation; Remote sensing

Princess Projectra (later Sensor Girl) is a fictional character, a superheroine in the DC Comics universe. Typically portrayed as a haughty member of an alien royal family, she is from the 30th and 31st centuries and is a member of the Legion of Super-Heroes.

Projectra was one of Jim Shooter's early creations on Legion of Super Heroes that helped cement his place in history as one of the seminal creators for the Legion. Shooter sold the original script in which Projectra debuted to DC Comics editor Mort Weisinger when Shooter was only 14 years old.

== Publication history ==
In 1965, at the age of 13, Jim Shooter submitted an unsolicited script to DC Comics editor Mort Weisinger. Weisinger was so impressed, he asked Shooter to send in another script. Shooter created a short origin story for Princess Projectra and several other characters and sent it in. Weisinger purchased all of these, and immediately started giving Shooter writing assignments.

Shooter's Projectra story first appeared in Adventure Comics #346 (July 1966) ("One of Us Is a Traitor"), when Shooter was 14 years old. The character later resigned from the Legion of Super-Heroes, and left the title, though later Legionnaire writer Paul Levitz had always intended to bring her back to the series in some form.

In 1985, in the Who Is Sensor Girl? storyline, a new character "Sensor Girl" was introduced. This character was fully masked, and when eventually unmasked, turned out to have been Projectra the whole time.

Sensor Girl's true identity was unknown to the other characters in the story and even to some of the creators on the title. Penciller Steve Lightle, who created Sensor Girl's costume, had no idea the character was supposed to be Princess Projectra, and believed her to be Supergirl. It is believed Levitz came up with the idea that Sensor Girl was Projectra significantly far into the development process of the story.

After this story line, she returned to her "Projectra" identity, but the character's most enduring association is arguably with this brief interlude as a mystery character.

Starting in the July 2019 series Legion of Super Heroes: Millennium, the character received a significant visual re-design.

== Fictional character biography ==
Projectra (often called by her nickname "Jeckie", a shortened form of her name) is a member of the royal family of the planet Orando, and possesses the superhuman ability to generate illusions affecting all five senses. During her membership in the LSH, she met, fell in love with, and married Karate Kid. After her father King Voxv died, she fought both her cousin Pharoxx and her grandmother and mentor, Hagga, who sought to usurp the throne. Afterward she became Queen Projectra of Orando, and she and Karate Kid became reserve members of the Legion of Super-Heroes. When the Legion of Super-Villains invaded Orando, Nemesis Kid defeated Karate Kid in personal combat. A dying Karate Kid used the last of his strength to destroy the Legion of Super-Villains machinery trying to move Orando to another dimension. Projectra subsequently killed Nemesis Kid in revenge, claiming royal privilege to do so even though it violated the Legion's code against killing. She resigned from the Legion of Super-Heroes during Karate Kid's funeral and used the Legion of Super-Villains' warp devices to take Orando to another dimension to preserve them from 30th-century technology and dangers.

Princess Projectra as Sensor Girl, drawn by Greg LaRocque and Mike DeCarlo in Legion of Super-Heroes #37 (Aug 1987).

Projectra was later ordered by her elders to pay penance for indirectly bringing the Legion of Super-Villains to Orando and returned to the Legion's dimension, using the pseudonym Sensor Girl. Her powers were enhanced giving her the ability to see beyond the illusions of life (such as the "illusions" of distance and physical obstacles). Rather than create obvious illusions, she used her illusion-projection effects to block her opponents' senses, project an illusion of darkness, or disorient victims by making it appear that their skin had vanished. Initially, she kept her identity hidden even from her fellow Legionnaires except for Saturn Girl, who vouched for her. She also cloaked herself with an illusionary disguise that fully masked her face. Projectra was later unmasked by the Emerald Empress during a battle with the Fatal Five. She came to renounce the throne of Orando.

Many years later, during the "Five Year Gap" following the Magic Wars, Earth falls under the control of the Dominators and withdraws from the United Planets. A few years later, the members of the Dominators' classified "Batch SW6" - temporal clones of the Legionnaires - escape captivity. The SW6 incarnation of Projectra was killed in battle fighting Dominion troops.

Princess Projectra is erased from existence following the Zero Hour: Crisis in Time! continuity reboot and replaced with Sensor, a separate character with a similar backstory and powers.

=== Threeboot ===
Princess Projectra returns in the "Threeboot" continuity. She is initially depicted as a spoiled child of the Orando royals and a non-powered but financially well-endowed supporter of the new Legion. Her demeanor changes when Orando is destroyed, causing her to become increasingly cold and detached. Her trauma awakens her hereditary ability to generate illusions, based on a particular form of witchcraft. Nearing the end of the current run of the Legion, Princess Projectra's power increased exponentially, granting her power over the id of individuals. In addition to creating illusions, her witchcraft can now briefly alter the behavior of individuals, forcing them to act out of their basest emotions, and even grant a tangible form to inhibitions and the darkest corner of someone's psyche.

=== Post-Infinite Crisis ===
In the pages of Justice Society of America #6, the pre-Crisis Sensor Girl is reintroduced alongside Dream Girl, Star Boy, Dawnstar, Wildfire, Timber Wolf, and Karate Kid. Writer Geoff Johns has indicated that this group is the original Legion, who have been "missing" from continuity since Crisis on Infinite Earths.

In The Lightning Saga storyline, Sensor Girl is trapped in the past before Dawnstar rescues her and restores her memories using the code word "Lightning Lad". Sensor Girl returns to her time before traveling to the 21st century to save the future in Last Stand of New Krypton.

== In other media ==
Princess Projectra appears as a character summon in Scribblenauts Unmasked: A DC Comics Adventure.
