= Sensor (character) =

Fictional character in the DC universe

Publication information
- Publisher: DC Comics
- First appearance: Legionnaires #43 (December 1996)
- Created by: Roger Stern; Tom McCraw; Jeffrey Moy (based on Princess Projectra, created by Jim Shooter)

In-story information
- Alter ego: Jeka Wynzorr
- Species: Orandan
- Place of origin: Orando (31st century)
- Team affiliations: Legion of Super-Heroes
- Abilities: Illusion generation; Limited telepathic abilities, allowing her to alter perception; Superhuman strength

This page discusses the post-Zero Hour reboot version of the character. For the other versions, see Princess Projectra.

Sensor (Jeka Wynzorr) is a superhero appearing in media published by DC Comics, primarily as a member of the Legion of Super-Heroes. Sensor was introduced following the events of Zero Hour: Crisis in Time!, which rebooted the continuity of the Legion. She is based on pre-existing character Princess Projectra and shares her ability to create illusions. Unlike Projectra, who has a human appearance, Sensor resembles a snake and is equipped with robotic limbs. Sensor was later exposed to Hypertaxis energy, mutating her into a humanoid form resembling a nāga. However, Sensor appeared in her original form in the later series Final Crisis: Legion of 3 Worlds and Action Comics.

== Fictional character biography ==
Jeka Wynzorr is the princess of the planet Orando, which is populated by a ruling class of snake-like aliens and an underclass resembling raccoons. She renounces her position to travel the galaxy and initially uses her illusion-casting abilities to disguise herself as a human. Jeka joins the Legion of Super-Heroes as Sensor and obtains cybernetic arms, which she is rarely seen without.

While battling the Terrorforms on Xanthu, Sensor is exposed to Hypertaxis energy, which causes her to mutate uncontrollably until Ra's al Ghul stabilizes her into a nāga-like form. Sensor becomes reclusive and bitter following her transformation, but remains with the Legion. She helps rescue the Legion when they are enslaved by Universo, whose powers do not affect her.

Sensor in her original form makes minor appearances in Final Crisis: Legion of 3 Worlds, where she is among the Legionnaires summoned to help fight the Time Trapper; and Action Comics (vol. 2), where she, Chameleon Boy, and Shrinking Violet unsuccessfully attempt to change the past.

== In other media ==
Sensor appears in Adventures in the DC Universe #10.
