= Karate Kid (character) =

DC Comics character

- Karate Kid as depicted in Countdown to Final Crisis #45 (June 2007). Art by Ed Benes.

Publication information
- Publisher: DC Comics
- First appearance: Adventure Comics #346 (July 1966)
- Created by: Jim Shooter (writer and artist)

In-story information
- Alter ego: Val Armorr
- Species: Human
- Place of origin: Earth (31st century)
- Team affiliations: Legion of Super-Heroes; Justice League
- Abilities: Master of every martial art up to the 31st century across the galaxy Peak human physical condition Able to sense weak spots in objects Resistance to mind control

Karate Kid (Val Armorr) is a superhero appearing in the DC Comics universe, primarily as a member of the Legion of Super-Heroes. He is a master of every form of martial arts to have been developed by the 31st century. The extent of his skill is so great that he can severely damage various types of hard material with a single blow and was briefly able to hold his own against Superboy through what he called "Super Karate".

Karate Kid has made limited appearances in other media, primarily in association with the Legion. He is voiced by Keith Ferguson in Legion of Super Heroes (2006) and Dante Basco in JLA Adventures: Trapped in Time.

== Publication history ==
Karate Kid first appeared in Adventure Comics #346 (July 1966) and was created by Jim Shooter. The character appeared in Shooter's first published story, along with other new members of the Legion of Super-Heroes: Princess Projectra, Ferro Lad, and Nemesis Kid.

The pre-Crisis on Infinite Earths Karate Kid was featured in a 15-issue ongoing series, cover dated March/April 1976 through July/August 1978. It was written primarily by Barry Jameson and Bob Rozakis, with pencils by Ric Estrada and Juan Ortiz. In the series, Karate Kid attempts to prove to King Voxv of Orando that he is worthy of marrying Princess Projectra. While in the past, he befriends schoolteacher Iris Jacobs and encounters teen heroes Superboy and Robin. He battles numerous villains, including Nemesis Kid, Major Disaster, and the Lord of Time. Eventually, he returns to the 30th century to assist the Legion during "Earthwar". Val made one final trip to the 20th century in 1982, to say good bye to the friends he had made there and to inform Iris Jacobs, the closest thing he had to a 20th-century girl friend, that he was going to marry Princess Projectra. She did not take the news well. Nemesis Kid,who joined the Legion at the same time Val did and was revealed as a traitor, became Val's archenemy.

== Fictional character biography ==
Val Armorr is the son of Japanese crime lord Kirau Nezumi, also known as Black Dragon. When he was born, his mother, American secret agent Valentina Armorr, tried to hide him from his father, but she failed and was killed for her effort. Japan's greatest hero, Sensei (White Crane), killed Black Dragon for his crimes and adopted the infant Val. He raised Val as if he were his own son and trained him in all manner of the martial arts. Val became the youngest warrior ever to earn the title Samurai, and he went to work for his local shogun. However, after trying his best and failing to please his supervisor, he quit and searched the galaxy for new forms of battle to master.

=== Legion of Super-Heroes ===
When Val returns to Earth, he learns that the Legion of Super-Heroes are searching for new recruits to battle the Khund. Despite lacking powers, he is accepted into the Legion after challenging Superboy to single combat and impressing him with his skill. As Karate Kid, Val becomes the leader of the Legion for one term. (Note: Val's term as leader began in Adventure Comics #382, November 1969, and ended with the first term of Mon-El in Adventure Comics #392, September 1970.)

Val falls in love with Princess Projectra and spends one year in the 20th century to prove that he is worthy to marry her. He returns to the 31st century to find that Projectra's father has died, with her cousin Pharoxx becoming king of Orando. After Projectra defeats Pharoxx, Val becomes her consort and resigns from the Legion.

Val and Projectra return from their honeymoon and learn that Orando has been taken over by the Legion of Super-Villains. Nemesis Kid mortally wounds Val, who prevents the Legion of Super-Villains from transporting Orando to another dimension before dying. Following his death, Val is succeeded as Karate Kid by Myg, a judge from the planet Lythyl.

During the "Five Years Later" storyline following the Magic Wars, Earth falls under the control of the Dominators and leaves the United Planets. A few years later, the members of the Dominators' classified "Batch SW6" - temporal clones of the Legionnaires - escape captivity. The SW6 incarnation of Karate Kid is killed in battle with the Dominators.

=== 1994 reboot ===
Post-Zero Hour Karate Kid as depicted in Legion of Superheroes #103 (April 1998). Art by Alan Davis.

In 1994, the Legion of Super-Heroes was rebooted following the Zero Hour: Crisis in Time! event, resurrecting the original Karate Kid in the process. Karate Kid joined Leland McCauley's Workforce to have the opportunity to travel to different planets and learn new disciplines, despite knowing that McCauley's values were far different from his own. He was able to live with those differences until McCauley attempted to profit from an anomaly in space which, to Val, represented something purely beautiful, like divine creation. Unable to reconcile his employment with his conscience any longer, he destroyed McCauley's anomaly-tapping machine and fled, and McCauley's men chased him, almost killing him. He asked for the Legion's protection, and they provided it, and, in a deal they worked out with McCauley, McCauley renounced any claim against Val, and Karate Kid became a Legionnaire.

The Threeboot incarnation of Karate Kid as depicted in Legion of Super-Heroes (vol. 5) #5 (June 2005). Art by Barry Kitson.

In 2005, Legion history was rebooted for a second time, with this third continuity being referred to as the "Threeboot". This version of Karate Kid is a combat instructor for the Legion. Although initially drawn to Shadow Lass, who possesses a similar warrior spirit, after he and Shadow Lass broke up, he harbored a one-sided infatuation with Phantom Girl.

=== One Year Later and Countdown ===
In "The Lightning Saga" event, the villain Trident is revealed to be Val Armorr from the pre-Crisis Legion. In issue #8, he battles Black Lightning and Batman in the Batcave. As Batman interrogates him, Karate Kid identifies himself as "Wes Holloway, a member of the Trident Guild". When the other Legionnaires return to their own time, Val remains in the 21st century.

In Countdown to Final Crisis, Karate Kid and Luornu Durgo, now known as Una, visit Barbara Gordon, where it revealed that Val is dying. They are sent to see Elias Orr, who declares that he has the answers they seek. Brother Eye scans Val, informing him that he is infected with the Morticoccus virus, and directs the group to Blüdhaven. Brother Eye later assimilates Una, who mortally wounds Karate Kid. As Dubbilex examines Karate Kid's corpse, the Morticoccus is released and spreads into the air.

Karate Kid is resurrected in the 2010 Legion of Super-Heroes series. He is seen with his wife Princess Projectra on their way to help the Legion against the Fatal Five.

== Skills and abilities ==
Due to an intense regime and training from a young age, Val is a virtual master of either most or all forms of martial arts and hand-to-hand combat in the galaxy by the 31st Century, making him a "living weapon" and specializes in a self-made style dubbed "Super Karate". He can sense the weakest spot in an object and damage durable materials such as metal and stone with a single blow. His discipline gives him resistance to mind control and prevents him from feeling pain.

As a member of the Legion of Super-Heroes, Karate Kid is provided a Legion Flight Ring, which allows him to fly and protects him from the vacuum of space and other dangerous environments. He has an extensive collection of weapons, but seldom uses them in combat.

== In other media ==
Karate Kid as he appears in the Legion of Super Heroes animated series.

- Karate Kid appears in Legion of Super Heroes, voiced by Keith Ferguson. This version was recruited into the Legion by Superman, who saw the value of having hand-to-hand combat experience over superpowers. Despite being looked down on by the other Legionnaires for his lack of powers, Karate Kid ends up being accepted into the group after he defeats Grimbor the Chainsman, who had subdued the rest of the Legion.
- Karate Kid appears as the main protagonist in JLA Adventures: Trapped in Time, voiced by Dante Basco. This version possesses ki-based attacks which come from the pupil of Val's right eye which he uses to see an opponent's weak points.
- Karate Kid appears as a character summon in Scribblenauts Unmasked: A DC Comics Adventure.
