= Legion of Super-Villains =

DC comics supervillain team

Publication information
- Publisher: DC Comics
- First appearance: Superman #147 (August 1961)
- Created by: Robert Bernstein (writer); Al Plastino (artist)

In-story information
- Member(s): Akka; Chameleon Chief; Cosmic King; Esper Lass; Hunter; Immortus; Lazon; Lightning Lord; Magno Lad; Micro Lad; Nemesis Kid; Ol-Vir; Questor; Radiation Roy; Ron-Karr; Saturn Queen; Spider Girl; Sun Emperor; Sun Killer; Titania; Tyr; Zymyr

The Legion of Super-Villains is a team of supervillains who appear in American comic books published by DC Comics, primarily as enemies of the Legion of Super-Heroes. They first appeared in Superman #147 (August 1961).

== Publication history ==
The Legion of Super-Villains were created at a time when Superman editor Mort Weisinger was consciously adding new elements to the "Superman mythos" over a period of years, building an extended cast of supporting characters who could provide new story opportunities. The creation of the Legion of Super-Heroes was part of that plan, and in the Legion's fourth appearance ("The Army of Living Kryptonite Men" in Superboy #86, January 1961), it was suggested that Lex Luthor would someday lead a group of super-villains. This would come to fruition seven months later, in Superman #147's story "The Legion of Super-Villains".

== Fictional team history ==
In pre-Crisis on Infinite Earths continuity, the Legion of Super-Villains was founded by Benno Tarik, who suffered irreparable damage to his vocal cords during a battle with the Science Police and developed a pathological hatred of law and order. Tarik founded a school for supervillains, which served as the headquarters and recruiting grounds for the Legion's first incarnation, and blackmailed Colossal Boy into joining as a teacher.

The Legion first appears when Lex Luthor creates a radio to contact the future, feeling there must be an evil counterpart to the Legion of Super-Heroes. He is broken out of jail by a gun, flying belt, and force-field helmet being sent into his cell. Luthor meets the trio of villains - Cosmic King, Lightning Lord, and Saturn Queen - who tell him of their origins. They cause trouble for Superman and lure him to a planetoid where he is captured in a Kryptonite field. Superman is sentenced to death before the adult Legion of Super-Heroes appears and rescues him. Luthor threatens to kill Superman, but Saturn Woman offers herself in his place. Superman asks for a tribute and is released after promising not to rescue Saturn Woman. Saturn Queen is given a fragment of Saturn's rings, which influence her into reforming, and the other villains are jailed. However, they would battle Superman at other points.

Several other incarnations of the group form over the years, led first by Sun Emperor and then by Nemesis Kid. In the last incarnation, they conquer Orando, the homeworld of Princess Projectra, and transport it to another dimension as a base of operations. Each villain is assigned to kill one Legionnaire, but only Nemesis Kid succeeds, fatally wounding Karate Kid.

=== Post-Zero Hour ===
Following Zero Hour, the Legion of Super-Villains appears in Final Crisis: Legion of 3 Worlds, a tie-in to the Final Crisis event. This incarnation of the Legion is led by Superboy-Prime and includes Lightning Lord, Saturn Queen, Cosmic King, Sun Emperor, Beauty Blaze, Ol-Vir, Tyr, Zymyr, Hunter, and Chameleon Chief as well as Black Mace, Universo, Dr. Regulus, Grimbor the Chainsman, Mordru, Esper Lass, Magno Lad, Micro Lad, Echo, Terrus, the League of Super-Assassins (Silver Slasher, Lazon, Neutrax, Mist Master, and Titania), the Fatal Five (Tharok, Emerald Empress, Persuader, Mano, and Validus), and the Justice League of Earth (Radiation Roy, Tusker, Spider Girl, Golden Boy, Storm Boy, and Earth-Man).

== Roster ==
- Akka - Expert martial artist from the planet Sklar. She was killed by Saturn Queen.
- Beauty Blaze - Possesses heat and fire-based abilities.
- Chameleon Chief (Jall Tannuz) - A Durlan who can shapeshift and transmute matter.
- Cosmic King (Laevar Bolto) - He possesses transmutation powers similar to Element Lad.
- Echo (Myke-4 Astor) - Sound and sonic-based abilities.
- Esper Lass (Meta Ulnoor) - She possesses telepathic powers similar to Saturn Girl.
- Hunter (Adam Orion) - The son of the original Hunter (Otto Orion), he seeks revenge on the Legion for his father's death.
- Immortus - A living brain implanted in a powerful android body.
- Lightning Lord (Mekt Ranzz) - A Winathian who is the brother of Garth Ranzz and Ayla Ranzz and shares their ability to generate bioelectricity. Having been born an only child on a planet where twin births are the norm, Lightning Lord developed an anti-social personality in response to being ostracized.
- Magno Lad (Kort Grezz) - He possesses magnetic abilities similar to Cosmic Boy.
- Micro Lad (Lalo Muldron) - Can shrink in size like Shrinking Violet. Killed by Akka.
- Nemesis Kid (Hart Druiter) - Can adapt the power to defeat any single enemy. Killed by Princess Projectra.
- Ol-Vir - A Daxamite who possesses similar abilities to Mon-El, but lacks his immunity to lead.
- Questor (Xart Prax) - A technologically amplified Coluan with heightened intelligence.
- Radiation Roy (Roy Travich) - A former applicant to the Legion of Super-Heroes who can emit radiation from his body. After trying out as Radiation Roy, he was rejected for not having enough control over his powers, as the radiation could potentially harm the Legion and civilians. Roy is not immune to his own powers and wears a containment suit to protect himself.
- Ron-Karr - A Neptunian who can become flat.
- Saturn Queen (Eve Aries) - A time-travelling telepath from the future.
- Spider Girl (Sussa Paka) - Has super-strong prehensile hair.
- Sun Emperor (Nigal Douglous) - Has solar powers similar to Sun Boy.
- Sun Killer (Kodama) - Possesses the powers of a star.
- Terrus - Possesses ground-based abilities and a body made up of a swarm of insects.
- Tyr - A warrior from the planet Tyrraz with a bionic gun in place of his right arm.
- Zymyr - A native of the planet Gil'Dishpan who can create portals.

The remaining villains are members of the League of Super-Assassins:

- Lazon - He can turn into light.
- Mist Master - He can turn into any vapor or gas.
- Neutrax - He can neutralize superpowers for a short period of time.
- Silver Slasher - She has a metallic-enhanced body and sharp nails.
- Titania - A super-strong female who is Silver Slasher's cousin.

The following joined the group during the Final Crisis storyline:

- Black Mace (Mick Yardreigh) - A highly trained and super-strong mercenary.
- Doctor Regulus (Zaxton Regulus) - A mad scientist with pyrokinetic abilities.
- Fatal Five - A group consisting of five of the greatest criminals in the universe.
  - Emerald Empress - Possesses various abilities derived from the Emerald Eye of Ekron.
  - Mano - Possesses a disintegrating anti-matter touch.
  - Persuader - Wields an atomic axe that can cut through anything.
  - Tharok - A man who was transformed into a cyborg after losing the left side of his body in an accident.
  - Validus - An alien monster with super-strength, enhanced durability, energy projection, and immunity to telepathy.
- Grimbor the Chainsman - A master craftsman and expert trap master.
- Justice League of Earth - A group of Legion of Super-Heroes rejects who attempt to save Earth by turning it into a xenophobic society.
  - Earth-Man (Kirt Niedrigh) - He can absorb and duplicate superpowers.
  - Golden Boy (Klint Stewirt) - He can change the structure of any element into gold via touch.
  - Storm Boy (Myke Chypurz) - He can control the weather.
  - Tusker (Horace Lafeaugh) - He has ivory-like tusks that can grow to certain sizes, and possesses a healing factor and enhanced strength, durability, and agility.
- Mordru - A powerful wizard.
- Superboy-Prime - A version of Superboy from Earth-Prime.
- Universo - An ex-Green Lantern Corps member with hypnotic abilities.

== In other media ==
The Legion of Super-Villains appear in Legion of Super Heroes, consisting of Lightning Lord (voiced by James Arnold Taylor), Hunter, Tyr (both voiced by Khary Payton), Esper Lass (Tara Strong), Ron-Karr (Shawn Harrison), and Wave, who has no dialogue. This version of the group are extortionists and assassins led by Lightning Lord in the first season and Tyr in the second season. First appearing in the first season episode "Lightning Storm", the group masquerades as a superhero team called the Light Speed Vanguard to outperform the Legion of Super-Heroes before their true intentions are exposed. In the second season, Lightning Lord and Ron-Karr reform and leave the group.
