= Universo =

- Universo, on the cover of Adventure Comics #349, art by Curt Swan.

Publication information
- Publisher: DC Comics
- First appearance: Adventure Comics #349 (October 1966)
- Created by: Jim Shooter (writer); Curt Swan (artist)

In-story information
- Alter ego: Vidar
- Species: Human; Titanian (post-Zero Hour continuity)
- Place of origin: Earth (31st century)
- Team affiliations: Green Lantern Corps; Legion of Super-Villains
- Partnerships: Dark Circle; Jacques Foccart; Legion of Substitute Heroes
- Notable aliases: Argus Oranx III, Earth President Kandro Boltax, Vid-Gupta
- Abilities: Mind control through hypnosis

Universo is a supervillain appearing in DC Comics, primarily as an enemy of the Legion of Super-Heroes. He was created by Jim Shooter and Curt Swan, and first appeared in Adventure Comics #349 (October 1966).

== Fictional character biography ==
=== Pre-Zero Hour ===
In Universo's first appearance, he is depicted as a powerful hypnotist. With his "Hypno Stone", he is able to control the head of the Time Institute, and lure the Legionnaires into a series of traps. The Legion defeats him with the help of a Time Cube invented by scientist Rond Vidar, who is revealed to be Universo's son.

With his next scheme, Universo manages to take control of Earth by posing as the new president, Kandro Boltax, using his powers of hypnosis, augmented by a chemical placed in the world's water supply. He accomplishes this while most of the Legion is away from Earth on a mission, and they return to find the Legion outlawed. The Legion find refuge in one of Lex Luthor's abandoned hideouts and eventually, with the help of Rond Vidar, are able to thwart his plans.

Years later, Legionnaires Blok and Timber Wolf view a file from the Legion Archives. Therein, it is revealed that Universo is a former member of the Green Lantern Corps who was assigned to journey to the Time Institute on Earth and prevent the Legion from viewing the dawn of time. When Universo attempted to view the dawn of time himself, he was stripped of his ring by the Guardians of the Universe.

Universo manages to temporarily take control of Earth again, posing as an aide to United Planets president Mojai Desai. In the storyline "The Universo Project", the villain succeeds in mentally controlling the entire Legion except the four members most difficult to hypnotize: Saturn Girl, Brainiac 5, Chameleon Boy, and Dream Girl. He strands the quartet on a distant world, but the four manage to make their way back to Earth and defeat Universo once again.

=== "Five Years Later" ===
The Dominators seize control of Earth during its economic collapse, and Universo ends up as one of the primary leaders of the resistance movement. He is branded a terrorist by the Dominion-backed Earthgov, who accuse him of working with the Khund. He was in fact working with the Dark Circle, though it is clear he is not working for them and has his own agenda. Jacques Foccart, Troy Stewart, and the former members of the Legion of Substitute Heroes work alongside him in resisting the Dominion control of Earth.

=== Post-Zero Hour ===
Following Zero Hour: Crisis in Time!, which reboots the Legion's continuity, Universo is depicted as Sarmon Ardeen, Saturn Girl's cousin. He first appears in the Legion/Titans crossover Universe Ablaze (March 2000), set in an alternate timeline in which the Titans are in suspended animation until the 31st century. After the timeline is restored, Universo makes an attempt to control Saturn Girl and the Titanet telepathic communication network. This fails, and Saturn Girl leaves his mind in the same fantasy scenario he had created for her. This version of Universo is erased from continuity following Infinite Crisis.

=== Post-Infinite Crisis ===
The events of the Infinite Crisis miniseries restored a close analogue of the pre-Crisis on Infinite Earths Legion to continuity. Universo is among the super-villains in Superboy-Prime's Legion of Super-Villains, as seen in the subsequent Final Crisis: Legion of 3 Worlds miniseries. Therein, he gives his assent and approval as Prime murders his son Rond, falsely believing that he would be able to seize Rond's power ring upon his death.

In The New 52, Universo disguises himself as president-elect Hiroshi Takaneda. After a precognitive terrorist attempts an assassination, he hypnotizes Saturn Girl into missing his true identity. It is revealed that within nine years, the United Planets will fall apart under Universo's rule.

== Other versions ==
An alternate universe version of Universo appears in Superboy's Legion. This version is a benevolent supercomputer and leader of the Science Police who is later destroyed by Lex Luthor and replaced by the Emerald Eye of Ekron.

== Powers and abilities ==
Universo's primary power is that of hypnosis, allowing him to control people in a manner that lasts long after he leaves them. He is able to shift loyalties, erase memories, and even have people under his control think independently to a degree to accomplish the goals he sets them to. Using his mental abilities, he can also appear to be someone else, so that everyone viewing him sees and remembers him as a completely different person.

== In other media ==
Universo appears in the one-shot Batman '66 Meets the Legion of Super-Heroes. This version is the descendant of Egghead.
