= Justice League vs. the Fatal Five =

2019 animated film directed by Sam Liu

- Promotional poster
- Directed by: Sam Liu
- Screenplay by: Eric Carrasco; Jim Krieg; Alan Burnett
- Story by: Eric Carrasco
- Based on: Justice League by: Gardner Fox
- Produced by: Sam Liu; Amy McKenna; Bruce Timm
- Starring: Elyes Gabel; Diane Guerrero; Kevin Conroy; Susan Eisenberg; George Newbern
- Edited by: Christopher D. Lozinski
- Music by: Michael McCuistion; Kristopher Carter; Lolita Ritmanis
- Production companies: Warner Bros. Animation; DC Entertainment
- Distributed by: Warner Bros. Home Entertainment
- Release dates: March 29, 2019 (WonderCon Anaheim); March 30, 2019
- Running time: 77 minutes
- Country: United States
- Language: English

Justice League vs. the Fatal Five is a 2019 American animated superhero film produced by Warner Bros. Animation and DC Entertainment. Featuring the DC Comics team Justice League created by Gardner Fox, the film is the 37th of the DC Universe Animated Original Movies. The film features the voices of Elyes Gabel and Diane Guerrero alongside Kevin Conroy, Susan Eisenberg, and George Newbern reprising their roles as Batman, Wonder Woman, and Superman, from various DC productions.

The film was first announced at San Diego Comic-Con on July 20, 2018, and had its world premiere at WonderCon Anaheim 2019 on March 29, 2019. It was released on Digital HD on March 30, 2019, and on 4K Ultra HD, Blu-ray, and DVD on April 16, 2019.

This is one of the posthumous releases for longtime DC producer Benjamin Melniker, who died just over a year before its release.

== Plot ==
In the 31st century, Mano, Tharok, and Persuader of the Fatal Five attack the Legion of Super-Heroes' headquarters for their time sphere. Star Boy, Saturn Girl and Brainiac 5 try to keep them back but fail. Just as the villains activate the sphere, Star Boy leaps at them and is taken along. Arriving in the 21st century, Star Boy triggers a trap Brainiac 5 programmed, trapping the villains inside a stasis field. While the sphere ends up in Metropolis, Star Boy comes down in Gotham City, where he discovers his supply of medicine, needed to stabilize his mind, was destroyed in his rough landing and does not exist in this era. Subsequently, his behavior becomes increasingly erratic, causing him to be apprehended by Batman and sent to Arkham Asylum. The stasis-locked time machine is picked up by Superman and brought to the Justice League's headquarters for analysis.

Ten months later, Jessica Cruz is struggling with the trauma of her near-death by a murderer who killed her friends, making her afraid to leave her apartment. Adding to her anxiety is that a Green Lantern ring chose her and that Wonder Woman keeps trying to recruit her into the Justice League. In Gotham, Miss Martian is trying to prove herself to Batman for membership in the League, but her inexperience when dealing with a hostage situation at Gotham News Network (GNN) caused by Bloodsport works against her good intentions. While trying to unlock the secret of the sphere, Mister Terrific accidentally deactivates the stasis field, freeing its occupants. Superman and Mister Terrific fight them, but Superman is wounded by Persuader's axe and the villains escape.

Star Boy's memory is jogged by a news report of the fight, and he breaks out of Arkham. The Justice League members compare notes about these mysterious assailants and discover they are time travelers; and from one of Star Boy's ravings, Batman deduces that they are after Jessica. When the three villains attack Jessica, Star Boy comes to her rescue, followed by Superman, Batman, Wonder Woman, Mister Terrific, and Miss Martian, who force them into flight after a hard struggle. In the aftermath, Star Boy and Jessica form a close friendship.

Miss Martian uses her telepathy to link herself, Batman and Jessica with Star Boy's mind, thus learning about the Legion. They witness a battle between the Legion and the Fatal Five, which ended with the capture of Mano's lover Emerald Empress and Validus; since no prison could hold them in the 31st century, the Legion took them to Oa in the past. Upon their awakening, the League receives an ultimatum from Mano: surrender Jessica or Tharok will set off bombs across the United States. The first bombings start in Metropolis, forcing the Justice League to move out. Left behind with Star Boy in the Watchtower, Jessica is contacted by Tharok through her ring, forcing her to surrender herself to the Five and enable them entry to Oa's prison cells. Despite interference by Kilowog and Salaak, Emerald Empress and Validus are freed. When Jessica fights back, Persuader destroys her ring. Afterwards, Emerald Empress steals the Central Power Battery's energy, and the Five return to Earth to recover the time sphere.

In the meantime, Star Boy discovers Jessica's absence and informs the League. The heroes proceed to the time machine's location, a secret military base, where the Fatal Five force them into battle. Emerald Empress subdues the Justice League and then initiates her master plan to use the Lantern's power to destroy the Sun, wipe out humanity, and prevent the formation of the Legion in their time. On Oa, Jessica recovers her faith and determination, and by reciting her oath, she reassembles her power ring. Brought back to her apartment, Jessica flies to the base and brings it down on the Fatal Five, killing them.

Superman, Jessica and Star Boy race after the Eye, but are too late to prevent it from plunging into the Sun. As the star cracks apart, Star Boy sacrifices himself by lowering himself into the Sun's core and using his powers to repair it. As the League commemorates Star Boy's heroism, they are joined by the Legion, who have come from the future to honor their fallen comrade. Batman also informs Miss Martian that she has been invited to join the Justice League, and she accepts the offer.

== Voice cast ==
- Elyes Gabel as Thomas Kallor / Star Boy
- Diane Guerrero as Jessica Cruz / Green Lantern
- Kevin Conroy as Batman
- Susan Eisenberg as Wonder Woman
- George Newbern as Superman
- Daniela Bobadilla as Miss Martian
- Kevin Michael Richardson as Mr. Terrific (credited), Kilowog (uncredited)
- Tara Strong as Saturn Girl (credited), Harley Quinn (uncredited)
- Noel Fisher as Brainiac 5
- Sumalee Montano as Emerald Empress
- Philip Anthony-Rodriguez as Mano
- Peter Jessop as Tharok
- Matthew Yang King as The Persuader
- Bruce Timm as Two-Face
- Tom Kenny as Bloodsport (credited), Salaak (uncredited)

== Production ==
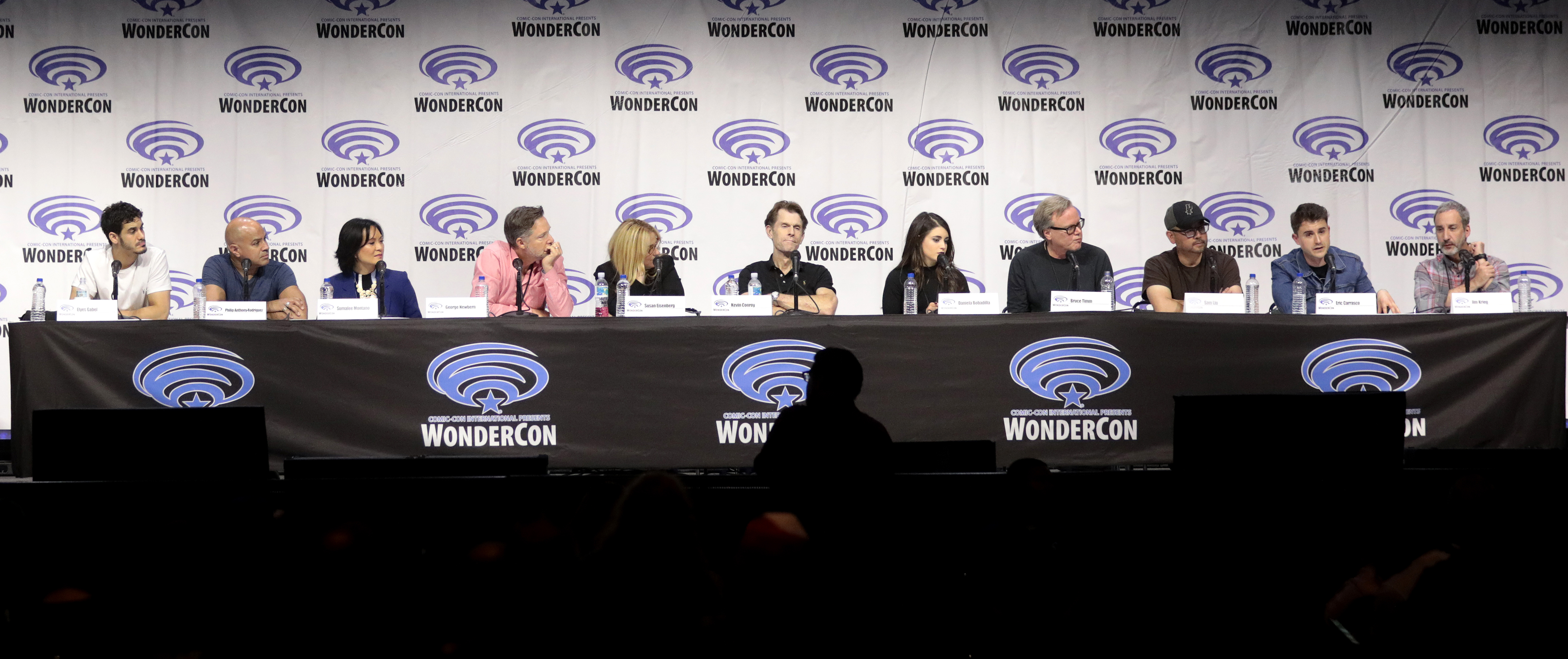
The cast, writers and producers of Justice League vs. the Fatal Five promoting the film at the 2019 WonderCon

The director is Sam Liu, who has directed prior DC animated films. The story was written by Eric Carrasco, partnered with Jim Krieg and Alan Burnett. The film features Kevin Conroy, Susan Eisenberg, and George Newbern reprising their roles as Batman, Wonder Woman, and Superman from Justice League and other DC productions.

Originally, the film was set to use Phil Bourassa's art style and models from Justice League: Crisis on Two Earths and Justice League: Doom, with the voice cast already having done their recordings. However, to avoid confusion with the New 52-based DC Animated Movie Universe (DCAMU) movies, the film used the animation models from Justice League/Justice League Unlimited. The main title themes from Batman: The Animated Series, Superman: The Animated Series, Justice League/Justice League Unlimited are included in the score by composers Michael McCuistion, Lolita Ritmanis, and Kristopher Carter (all DCAU alumni) to represent their respective characters.

While its canonicity with the DC Animated Universe (DCAU) is open-ended, executive producer Bruce Timm considers the film to be canon.

== Soundtrack ==
The complete score was released by Dynamic Soundtrack Records on January 15, 2021. It can be purchased via Apple Music and other outlets.

== Critical reception ==
Reviews to the film were generally favorable. On review aggregator website Rotten Tomatoes, the film holds an approval rating of 100% based on eight reviews, with an average rating of 6.6/10.

Eric Vilas-Boas, writing for /Film, praised the film's handling of characters with mental health challenges. Roman Julian, writing for MovieWeb, lauded the return of the classic DCAU animation, but criticized the film's "mediocre story".

=== Sales ===
The film earned $2,154,235 from domestic Blu-ray sales.
