= Hunter (comics) =

Hunter Otto Orion/Adam Orion

Publication information
- Publisher: DC Comics
- First appearance: Otto Orion; Adventure Comics #358 (July 1967); Adam Orion; Superboy #199 (November 1973)
- Created by: Cary Bates (writer); Dave Cockrum (artist)

In-story information
- Alter ego: Adam Orion; Otto Orion
- Place of origin: Simballi
- Team affiliations: Legion of Super-Villains
- Abilities: Master hunter and tracker

Hunter is the name of two supervillains appearing in media published by DC Comics, primarily as enemies of the Legion of Super-Heroes.

== Fictional character biographies ==
=== Otto Orion ===
The first incarnation of Hunter debuted in Adventure Comics #358 (July 1967). Otto Orion is a master hunter on the planet Simballi who became the planet's sole ruler. Hoping to find new prey to hunt, Orion hunts the Legion of Super-Heroes, during which he is killed in battle.

=== Adam Orion ===
The second Hunter debuted in Superboy #199 (November 1973). Adam Orion is the son of Otto Orion. He blames the Legion for his father's death and intends to get revenge on them, but is stopped by Bouncing Boy. Some time later, he joins the expanded Legion of Super-Villains gathered by Nemesis Kid. In Final Crisis, Hunter appears as a member of Superman-Prime's Legion of Super-Villains.

== Powers and abilities ==
Both incarnations of Hunter are master hunters and trackers.

== In other media ==
The Adam Orion incarnation of Hunter appears in Legion of Super Heroes, voiced by Khary Payton. This version is an extortionist and assassin who masquerades as a superhero and member of the Light Speed Vanguard before being exposed.
