= Esper Lass =

Publication information
- Publisher: DC Comics
- First appearance: Superboy Starring the Legion of Super-Heroes #212 (October 1975)
- Created by: Jim Shooter (writer); Mike Grell (artist)

In-story information
- Alter ego: Meta Ulnoor
- Place of origin: Titan
- Team affiliations: Legion of Super-Villains
- Abilities: Telepathy

Esper Lass (Meta Ulnoor) is a supervillain appearing in media published by DC Comics, primarily as an enemy of the Legion of Super-Heroes.

== Publication history ==
Esper Lass first appeared in Superboy Starring the Legion of Super-Heroes #212 (October 1975), and was created by Jim Shooter and Mike Grell.

== Fictional character biography ==
Meta Ulnoor is from Titan, the moon of Saturn, in the 30th century. Like other natives of Titan (including Legionnaire Saturn Girl), she is a natural telepath. After being rejected for membership in the Legion of Super-Heroes due to a rule prohibiting members with duplicate powers, she joins a group of fellow rejects and demands membership. Calling themselves the "Legion of Super-Rejects", they are initially victorious over their like-powered rivals. Esper Lass and the Super-Rejects are eventually defeated.

Esper Lass later appears as a member of the Legion of Super-Villains. In Final Crisis: Legion of 3 Worlds, she attacks Saturn Girl alongside Saturn Queen, but is defeated by the Saturn Girl of Earth-Prime.

== Powers and abilities ==
Like other natives of Titan, Esper Lass was born with a number of psychic powers. She can read minds, and exert some mental control over others. In her initial appearance, Esper Lass proves to have stronger powers than Saturn Girl, who she is able to overpower.

== In other media ==
Esper Lass appears in Legion of Super Heroes, voiced by Tara Strong. This version is an extortionist and assassin who masquerades as a superhero and member of the Light Speed Vanguard before being exposed.
