= Lobo (comics) =

Lobo name in comics

Lobo, in comics, may refer to:

- Lobo (character), the alien bounty hunter
- Lobo (Dell Comics), the African-American comic book character
- Lobo the Duck, an Amalgam Comics fusion of DC's Lobo and Marvel's Howard the Duck

It may also refer to:

- Lobo Brothers, two Marvel Comics werewolves
- Maximus Lobo, a Marvel Comics character

== See also ==
- Lobo (disambiguation)
