= List of teams and organizations in DC Comics =

This is a list of teams and organizations that appear in various DC Comics publications.

Note: Please check Category:DC Comics superhero teams before adding any redundant entries for superhero teams to the page.

== A ==
=== Academy of Arch-Villains ===
The Academy of Arch-Villains was a gathering of Wonder Woman villains Angle Man, Human Fireworks, and Mouse Man.

=== Agenda ===
The Agenda are a group similar to Project Cadmus who created Match, a clone of Superboy.

=== Agony and Ecstasy ===
Agony and Ecstasy are a duo of enforcers of Hell.

=== Alien Alliance ===
There are two versions of the Alien Alliance:

=== Allied Supermen of America ===
The Allied Supermen of America team was created as an homage to the Golden Age Justice Society of America and the Silver Age Justice League. The team was created by Alan Moore and included characters created by Rob Liefeld and Erik Larsen. It was introduced in Supreme #14.

=== Amazon Nation ===
The Amazon Nation are a hidden female tribe. First appearance: (historic) All-Star Comics #8 (Winter 1941); (current) Wonder Woman (vol. 2) #1 (February 1987).

=== A.P.E. ===
Short for Allied Perpetrators of Evil, A.P.E. is a supervillain group in The New Adventures of Superman. First appearing in "The Men from A.P.E.", the line-up consists of Lex Luthor, Toyman, Prankster, and Warlock. In "A.P.E. Strikes Back", Brainiac joins the group.

=== A.P.E.S. ===
Short for All-Purpose Enforcement Squad.

=== Argent ===
Argent is a 1950s domestic secret agent team. First appearance: Secret Origins (vol. 3) #14 (May 1987).

=== Awesome Threesome ===
The Awesome Threesome are a trio of robots that have antagonized Aquaman. They consist of Claw, Magneto, and Torpedo Man.

==== Awesome Threesome in other media ====
The Awesome Threesome appear in The Superman/Aquaman Hour of Adventure.

== B ==
=== B.I.O.N. ===
Short for Biologically Integrated Organic Network.

=== Black Dragon Society ===
Black Dragon Society
- Black Dragon Society, art by Tom Grummett.

Publication information
- Publisher: DC Comics
- First appearance: All Star Comics #12 (August 1942) (DC); Master Comics #21 (Fawcett) (December 1941); Military Comics #24 (November 1943) (Quality)
- Created by: Gardner Fox (writer); Jack Burnley (artist)

In-story information
- Type of organization: Terrorist
- Leader(s): Dragon King

The Black Dragon Society is a non-fictional Japanese secret society, also known as the Kokuryūkai, which appears in DC Comics. The publisher first used the name in 1942's All Star Comics issue #12 (August 1942) as Japanese saboteurs. They were created by Gardner Fox and Jack Burnley. The same name and concept was also used by several other 1940s comics publishers that were later bought out by DC. A modern reimagining of the group as ecoterrorists was presented in JLA.

==== Publication history ====
The Black Dragon Society is based on a real World War II organization of the same name. As such, three separate comics companies (National Comics, Fawcett Comics, and Quality Comics) used them as villains.

The Fawcett Comics version debuted in Master Comics #21 (December 1941), it had Minute-Man fighting against the Society, and was created by Bill Woolfolk and Charles Sultan. The DC Comics version debuted in All Star Comics #12 (August 1942) and was created by Gardner Fox and Jack Burnley, in the story "The Black Dragon Menace" in which a Japanese spy ring called the Black Dragon Society of Japan steals eight American inventions and kidnaps their inventors. Quality Comics' version debuted in Military Comics #24 (November 1943), and was created by Ted Udall and Vernon Henkel.

Black Dragons in action, art by Tom Grummett.

The modern versions of the Black Dragon Society appear in JLA. This version appears to be made up of fanatical, east Asian eco-terrorists with the stated intention of putting an end to the exploitation of Pacific oil fields by the west. They take the executive board of the Petroil oil company hostage, and kill all of their security and support staff. The Power Company shows up and shuts down the Black Dragons before they can kill their hostages. At the end of the story, it is revealed that the entire incident was only part of making a TV commercial for the Power Company, with the Black Dragon members being actors.

== C ==
=== CAELOSS ===
CAELOSS is short for The Citizen's Army for the Economic Liberation of Suicide Slum.

=== C.E.M.A. ===
C.E.M.A. is short for Cosmic Emergency Management Agency.

=== Children of Cronus ===
The Children of Cronus are a group of Titans who were responsible for empowering Devastation.

=== Club of Heroes ===
See Batmen of All Nations

=== Crime Champions ===
The Crime Champions are a fictional organization appearing in American comic books published by DC Comics. They first appeared in Justice League of America #21 and were created by Gardner Fox and Mike Sekowsky.

The Crime Champions are an organization of supervillains that consist of Earth-One villains Chronos, Doctor Alchemy, and Felix Faust and Earth-Two villains Fiddler, Icicle, and Wizard.

== D ==
=== Darkseid's Elite ===
Darkseid's Elite are the top warriors chosen by Darkseid, the ruler of Apokolips. The Elite became Darkseid's most powerful band of warriors. Its known members include Amazing Grace, Bane of Apokolips, Brola, DeSaad, Devilance, Doctor Bedlam, Glorious Godfrey, Granny Goodness, Kalibak, Kanto, Lady Justeen, Mantis, Mortalla, Steppenwolf, Titan, and Virman Vundabar.

=== Dayton Industries ===
Dayton Industries is a company that was founded by Mento.

=== Deep Six ===
The Deep Six is a group of fish-like humanoids from Apokolips that consist of Gole, Jaffer, Kurin, Shaligo the Flying Finback, Slig, and Trok. At the bidding of their master, Darkseid, the Deep Six exist for the sole purposes of combat and terrorism in his name. They all have the ability to breathe and function underwater.

The team returns to face Aquaman and his allies Koryak and Dolphin in Aquaman (vol. 5) #6 (April 1995), where it is revealed that the team has been resurrected several times over the years whenever Darkseid has use for them. The new members are actually "spawns" of the original, raised in birthing chambers.

In the storyline "Infinite Crisis", the Deep Six appear as members of Alexander Luthor Jr.'s Secret Society of Super Villains.

In Countdown to Final Crisis, the Deep Six are killed by Infinity-Man.

=== Demons Three ===
The Demons Three are three demonic brothers consisting of Abnegazar, Ghast, and Rath. They ruled Earth one billion years prior before being banished by the Timeless Ones, though they have occasionally escaped using Felix Faust's power. Their powers are bound to three mystic artifacts: the Green Bell of Uthool, the Silver Wheel of Nyorlath, and the Red Jar of Calythos.

==== Demons Three in other media ====
- The Demons Three appears in The Super Powers Team: Galactic Guardians episode "The Case of the Stolen Powers", with Ghast voiced by Peter Cullen.
- The Demons Three appear in the Justice League Unlimited episode "The Balance", with Abnegazar voiced by Wayne Knight while Ghast and Rath have no dialogue.
- The Demons Three appear in Justice League Action, with Abnegazar voiced by Damian O'Hare and Rath by Jason J. Lewis while Ghast has no dialogue. This version of the group are members of the Brothers Djinn alongside series-original characters Calythos (voiced by David Lodge), Uthool (voiced by Diedrich Bader), and Nyorlath (voiced by Chris Diamantopoulos). Additionally, Ghast appears in the episode "Hat Trick" as a kaiju-like demon that Felix Faust summons to regain his youth.
- The Demons Three appear in Justice League Dark, with Abnegazar voiced by JB Blanc, Rath by Jeffrey Vincent Parise, and Ghast by Fred Tatasciore.
- The Demons Three appear in The Batman Strikes! #50. This version of the group were previously allies of Etrigan centuries prior before attempting to lead a rebellion in Hell and being imprisoned in a magic box.

=== Digitronix Corporation ===
Digitronix Corporation is a company in The Hacker Files.

== E ==
=== Euroguard ===
Euroguard is a temporary band in Europe created by the JLE and led by Power Girl.

=== Everyman Project ===
The Everyman Project was created by Lex Luthor to grant a group of people identities and powers and become part of his incarnation of Infinity, Inc.

=== Excalibur Crew ===
The Excalibur Crew was the shuttle crew that Hank Henshaw was a part of.

== F ==
=== Freedom Fighters ===
The Freedom Fighters is a superhero team appearing in American comic books published by DC Comics. The original six characters were the Black Condor, Doll Man, the Human Bomb, the Ray, the Phantom Lady, and Uncle Sam. Although the characters were created by Quality Comics, they were not gathered in a group until they were acquired by DC. The team first appeared in a Justice League of America/Justice Society of America team-up, which ran in Justice League of America #107–108 (October–December 1973), written by Len Wein and drawn by Dick Dillin. Their own ongoing series premiered with Freedom Fighters #1 (April 1976), written by Gerry Conway and Martin Pasko, and drawn by Ric Estrada.

==== Freedom Fighters in other media ====
- The Freedom Fighters appear in the Batman: The Brave and the Bold episode "Cry Freedom Fighters!", consisting of Uncle Sam, Black Condor, Doll Man, Human Bomb, Phantom Lady, Plastic Man, and the Ray.
- The Freedom Fighters appear in the Arrowverse crossover "Crisis on Earth-X", consisting of Leo Snart, Red Tornado, Winn Schott, and the Ray.
- The Freedom Fighters appear in Justice League: Crisis on Infinite Earths, consisting of Uncle Sam, Black Condor, Doll Man, Phantom Lady, and the Ray.
- The Freedom Fighters appear in Justice League Unlimited #17.

== G ==
=== Galaxy Communications ===
Galaxy Communications

Publication information
- Publisher: DC Comics
- First appearance: Superman's Pal, Jimmy Olsen #133 (October 1970)
- Created by: Jack Kirby

In-story information
- Type of business: Mass media
- Base(s): Metropolis
- Owner(s): Morgan Edge, CEO

Roster
- See: Vincent Edge; Clark Kent; Lana Lang; Lola Barnett; Steve Lombard; Lois Lane; Perry White; Josh Coyle; Glorious Godfrey; Cat Grant; Iris West Allen

Galaxy Communications is a multinational media corporation in the DC Comics universe. It is owned and run by businessman and crime lord Morgan Edge.

Originally spearheaded by Morgan Edge, Galaxy Communications is one of the world's leading telecommunications companies and a major economic engine of both Metropolis and the United States. It has a broadband division that supplies Americans with digital television, internet and phone services, and also produces periodicals and books through the subsidiary Galaxy Publishing.

Between the early 1970s and mid-1980s, Clark Kent and Lois Lane worked for WGBS after Galaxy Communications purchased the Daily Planet, with Clark as an anchorman. He was eventually joined by Lana Lang as a co-anchor. After John Byrne's revamp of Superman's origins, Clark and Lois were reverted to working at the Daily Planet once again.

==== Galaxy Communications in other media ====
- GBS, or Galaxy Broadcasting System, appears in Young Justice. Its reporters include Cat Grant and Iris West. G. Gordon Godfrey becomes a pundit for the station and uses his program to defame extraterrestrials and the Justice League.
- WGBS News appears in media set in the DC Extended Universe.
- Galaxy Broadcasting System appears in Batman: Arkham City.
- Galaxy Broadcasting System appears in DC Universe Online.

=== Gunner and Sarge ===
Gunner and Sarge are World War II US Marines. First appearance: Our Fighting Forces #45 (May 1958).

== H ==
=== The Hand ===
The Hand is a gang featured in Legionnaires #1 (April 1993).

=== Hand of Krona ===
The Hand of Krona is an interstellar technology cult.

=== Hunter's Hellcats ===
Hunter's Hellcats are a World War II commando unit. First appearance: Our Fighting Forces #106 (April 1967).

=== Hyperclan ===
The Hyperclan is a White Martian Vanguard.

== I ==
=== IMHS ===
The IMHS is short for the Institute of Metahuman Studies.

=== International Club of Heroes ===
See Batmen of All Nations

== J ==
=== Jokerz ===
The Jokerz are a gang that are modeled after Joker.

==== DC Animated Universe ====
The Jokerz were created for the animated series Batman Beyond. Three iterations of the Jokerz appear in Batman Beyond and related series in the DC Animated Universe.

- The first Jokerz group are known for committing petty pranks and harassment around Gotham City. They are led by J-Man, who dresses in a style similar to the Joker, and consist of Dottie, Smirk, Coe, Spike, Scab, and Top Hat. This branch of the Jokerz also appears in the Static Shock episode "Future Shock".
- The second Jokerz group appears in the Batman Beyond episode "Hidden Agenda", led by Carter Wilson / Terminal and consisting of Trey, Tayko, and Weasel.
- The third Jokerz group appears in Batman Beyond: Return of the Joker, led by a resurrected Joker and consisting of Bonk, Chucko, Dee Dee, Ghoul, and Woof. An alternate timeline iteration of the Jokerz appears in the Justice League Unlimited episode "The Once and Future Thing", where they are working for Chronos and sport cybernetic enhancements. The present-day Batman, John Stewart and Wonder Woman stop Chronos and undo the damage he did to the timestream, erasing the Jokerz from existence.

==== Mainstream comics ====
In the comic book series Batman Beyond Unlimited, Doug Tan becomes the leader of the Jokerz. Tan declares himself as the Joker King, leading the Jokerz to cause chaos in Neo-Gotham City. He is ultimately killed following a battle with Batman and his allies.

In the mainstream comics, Dick Grayson encounters a modern-day version of the Jokerz which is led by a man impersonating the real Joker.

==== Jokerz in other media ====
- The Jokerz appear in Batman Beyond: Year One.
- The Jokerz appear in Gotham City Impostors.

=== Just'a Lotta Animals ===
See Captain Carrot and His Amazing Zoo Crew!

=== Justice Alliance of America ===
The Justice Alliance of America is the name of two organizations.

==== Earth-D ====
The Justice Alliance is an international superhero team from Earth-D, an alternate universe. It is led by Superman and consists of Aquaman, Atom, Batman, Robin, Flash (Tanaka Rei), Green Arrow, Green Lantern (José Hernandez), Hawkgirl, Hawkman, Martian Manhunter, Supergirl, and Wonder Woman.

==== Main universe ====
The Justice Alliance is a short-lived group that was intended to replace the Justice Society of America after their disbanding. This Justice Alliance was formed by Captain Comet and consisted of Automan, Congorilla, Prince Ra-Man, and Tiger-Man.

=== Justice League ===
==== Justice League Antarctica ====
See Injustice League

=== Justice Society Dark ===
The Justice Society Dark is a team that Doctor Fate enlisted to help find a way to free Salem the Witch Girl from her Limbo Town curse and to find her after she mysteriously vanished. The Justice Society Dark consists of Mister Miracle, Zatara, Diamond Jack, Blue Beetle, and Doctor Occult, who all used magic to slow their aging.

=== Justifiers ===
There are two groups called Justifiers:

== L ==
=== Labrats ===
The Labrats are genetically altered teenage heroes. First appearance: Labrats #1 (April 2002).

=== League of Super-Assassins ===
The League of Super-Assassins is a group of assassins who are enemies of the Legion of Super-Heroes. All six of its members are survivors of the destroyed planet Dryad and were manipulated by the Dark Man (a clone of Tharok) into believing that the Legion was responsible for Dryad's destruction. Unbeknownst to the League, the Legionnaires managed to evacuate most of Dryad's population prior to its destruction. After learning the truth, the League continues to operate with the Dark Man's influence, while one of their members, Blok, joins the Legion.

=== Legion of Super-Rejects ===
The Legion of Super-Rejects are a group of failed Legion of Super-Heroes applicants who were rejected for possessing the same powers as a pre-existing member. They consist of Phantom Lad (Solon Darga), a Bgtzlian with the same abilities as Phantom Girl; Calorie Queen (Taryn Loy), a Bismollian with the same abilities as Matter-Eater Lad; Magno Lad (Kort Grezz), a Braalian with the same abilities as Cosmic Boy; Esper Lass (Meta Ulnoor), a Titanian with the same abilities as Saturn Girl; Micro Lad (Lalo Muldron), an Imskian with the same abilities as Shrinking Violet; and Chameleon Kid (Toog Lintens), a Durlan with the same abilities as Chameleon Boy.

== M ==
=== Madmen ===
The Madmen are a team of villains in the DC Comics universe. They were originally owned by Charlton Comics, but DC later acquired the rights to the characters.The Madmen first appeared in Blue Beetle #3 (1967) and were created by Steve Ditko and David Glanzman.

The Madmen are a group of gangsters and enemies of Blue Beetle who wear colorful costumes and facepaint. The Madmen became a more persistent annoyance to Blue Beetle. The group's leader, Farley Fleeter, begins working at Georgetown University to steal drugs. While there, he is involved in an accident that gives him the power to mentally control anyone he touched. He uses this power to create an army of Madmen, but is defeated in a confrontation with Hawk and Dove.

During the Infinite Crisis storyline, the Madmen are invited to join Alexander Luthor Jr.'s Secret Society of Super Villains. During a battle in Metropolis, most of the Madmen are killed by Wild Dog, Crimson Avenger, and Vigilante.

==== Madmen in other media ====
- The Madmen (referred to as the Madniks) appear in the Batman: The Brave and the Bold episode "Menace of the Madniks!", with Krebs (voiced by Dee Bradley Baker) as a prominent member.
- The Madmen appear as character summons in Scribblenauts Unmasked: A DC Comics Adventure.
- The Madmen appear in Justice League Unlimited #10.

=== Menagerie ===
In September 2011, The New 52 rebooted DC's continuity. In this new timeline during the "Forever Evil" storyline, the Menagerie is a group led by Cheetah. The group consists of Elephant Man, Hellhound, Lion-Mane, Mäuschen, Primape, and Zebra-Man. Steve Trevor and Killer Frost fight them to claim Wonder Woman's lasso and free the Justice League from the Firestorm matrix. While Steve Trevor manages to defeat Cheetah, the rest of the Menagerie are frozen by Killer Frost.

=== Meta-Militia ===
See Champions of Angor

=== Metallik ===
See Team Titans

=== Millennium Giants ===
The Millennium Giants are guardians of the balance of the Ley Lines. First appearance: The Man of Steel #78 (April 1998).

=== Minute Men of America ===
The Minute Men of America are radio operators who are allies of Hourman. Its known members are Jimmy Martin and Thorndyke Thompkins.

=== Misfits ===
The Misfits are a group of under-rated Batman villains. First appearance: Shadow of the Bat #7 (December 1992).

=== Monster Men ===
The Monster Men are a group of monsters who serve Hugo Strange.

The Monster Men in the Golden Age comics are the results of insane asylum patients being injected with a serum by Hugo Strange, which transformed them into dimwitted 10 ft. tall strong beings. Batman was able to make an antidote and take down some of the Monster Men after punching Strange out of a window.

The Silver Age comics had the Monster Men created from wealthy patients that visited Hugo Strange's institutions. When Strange claimed that Batman is Bruce Wayne, some Monster Men attacked Batman and he was able to defeat them. Silver St. Cloud later encountered some of these Monster Men. Strange's minion Magda tried to use the Monster Men formula on Bruce only to end up using it on herself when Nightwing interfered. Robin was able to knock Magda unconscious and rescued Bruce and Alfred Pennyworth.

=== Morrigan ===
The Morrigan are three war goddesses with plans to eliminate the Amazons.

=== Mud Pack ===
Before the debut appearances of the fifth and sixth Clayfaces, Clayface (Preston Payne) and Clayface (Sondra Fuller) team up, breaking Clayface (Basil Karlo) out of prison. Karlo also futilely tries to revive Clayface (Matt Hagen). Together, the trio form the Mud Pack with Hagen being made a posthumous member of the group. Karlo later gains the others' powers by injecting himself with extracts of blood samples from Payne and Fuller, becoming the "Ultimate Clayface". Karlo is defeated by Batman and Looker and Payne and Fuller escape.

== N ==
=== New Blackhawk Air Corps ===
See Blackhawk (DC Comics)

== O ==
=== Old Justice ===
Old Justice is a superhero group formed when TNT's sidekick Dan the Dyna-Mite, Neptune Perkins, Green Lantern's sidekick Doiby Dickles, Sylvester Pemberton's adoptive sister Merry Pemberton, Minute Men of America member Thorndyke Thompkins, and Red Tornado's sidekicks the Cyclone Kids came together.

=== O.S.O. ===
O.S.O. is short for Office of Special Operations.

== P ==
=== Parliament of Decay ===
The Parliament of Decay are a group associated with the Black or the Rot, a cosmic force which is strongly associated with death. The decay and rotting of living things is where it flourishes, with its base being in the "Bone Kingdom" in the deadlands of the United States.

=== Parliament of Flames ===
The Parliament of Flames are a group of fire elementals associated with the Burn, a cosmic force of fire.

=== Parliament of Limbs ===
The Parliament of Limbs are a group associated with the Red, a cosmic force connecting all animal life.

=== Parliament of Stone ===
The Parliament of Stone are a group of Earth elementals associated with the Melt, a cosmic force connecting all minerals.

=== Parliament of Trees ===
The Parliament of Trees are a group of plant elementals associated with the Green, a cosmic force connecting all plant life.

=== Parliament of Vapours ===
The Parliament of Vapours are a group of air elementals associated with the White, a cosmic force of air.

=== Parliament of Waves ===
The Parliament of Waves are a group associated with the Clear (sometimes called the Blue), a cosmic force connecting all aquatic life.

=== People's Heroes ===
People's Heroes is the name of two organizations.

==== First People's Heroes ====
The People's Heroes are a group of Russian agents that consists of Bolshoi, Molotov, Pravda, and Hammer and Sickle.

==== Second People's Heroes ====
In Doomsday Clock, the People's Heroes are Russia's sanctioned superhero team led by Pozhar and consisting of Black Eagle, Firebird, Lady Flash, Morozko, Negative Woman, Perun, Red Star, Rusalka, Snow Owl, Steel Wolf, Tundra, Vikhor, and Vostok-X.

=== Planeteers ===
The Planeteers are a 22nd-century space police force that Tommy Tomorrow is a member of.

=== Point Men ===
The Point Men are foes of Young Justice.

=== Project Cadmus ===
Project Cadmus (sometimes Cadmus Labs) is a genetic engineering project that was founded by Dabney Donovan, Reginald Augustine, and Thomas Thompkins. Named after the Ancient Greek mythological hero Cadmus, who was said to have created an army of warriors by sowing dragon teeth into the dirt, the purpose of the project is to create living bioweapons, such as clones, mutants and genetic hybrids. The Cadmus facilities were originally constructed in a large, abandoned aqueduct outside of Metropolis, later clarified to be located under Mount Curtiss, in Kirby County, Delaware, about 50-75 miles northwest of the city. Donovan is responsible for the non-human creations of the Project, referred to as "DNAliens", various normal clones, and creatures based on classical monsters.

Cadmus is run for a time by Paul Westfield. After Superman's death at the hands of Doomsday, Westfield has Superman's body stolen for Cadmus' use. Project Cadmus goes on to create Superboy, a clone designed to replace Superman. Initially, Superboy's genetic material came from Westfield; a later retcon established that Superboy's genetic material came from Superman and Lex Luthor.

The original Cadmus site was destroyed during a conflict with Lex Luthor and the labs were later rebuilt deep underground Metropolis directly.

==== Project Cadmus in other media ====
- Project Cadmus appears in series set in the DC Animated Universe (DCAU). Primarily appearing in Justice League Unlimited, this version of the organization was originally created to counter Superman after he was brainwashed by Darkseid before extending their goal to countering the Justice League due to the discovery of the Justice Lords during the events of the Justice League episode "A Better World". After Luthor uses their technology to fuse himself with Brainiac and is defeated by the Flash, Cadmus ceased operations against the League.
- Cadmus Labs appears in Smallville. This version of the organization was initially a financially and legally struggling company owned by Henry and Victoria Hardwick, before Lex Luthor acquired Cadmus following a hostile takeover.
- Project Cadmus appears in Young Justice, consisting of Mark Desmond, Dubbilex, Amanda Spence, Guardian, and the Genomorphs.
- Project Cadmus appears in Supergirl, led by Lillian Luthor. This version of the organization has a longstanding relationship with the U.S. government and works to eliminate alien threats.
- Cadmus Labs appears in Titans. This version of the organization is led by Mercy Graves.
- Project Cadmus appears in the My Adventures with Superman episode "My Adventures with Mad Science". This version of the organization is a branch of Task Force X based in a facility outside of Metropolis.
- Cadmus Labs appears in Superman Returns.

=== Psyba-Rats ===
The Psyba-Rats are teenage hackers.

=== Pyre ===
The Pyre are unrevealed villains made up of fire in the Martian Manhunter comics.

== Q ==
=== Quorum ===
The Quorum is a rogue American agency.

== R ==
=== Red Hood Gang ===
The Red Hood Gang is an organization appearing in American comic books published by DC Comics. They first appeared in Batman (vol. 2) #0 (November 2012) in The New 52 (a 2011 reboot of the DC universe).

The young Bruce Wayne returned to Gotham City to start a crime-fighting career with the Red Hood Gang as an early target of infiltration. To Bruce's dismay, the Red Hood Gang's leader knows the group has been infiltrated and manages to weed out the disguised Bruce. The Red Hood Gang attempts to kill him, but Bruce manages to escape into the sewers after the Gotham City Police Department show up to break up a robbery. The Red Hood Gang follow into the sewer system, but a prototype motorcycle hidden in the tunnels allows Bruce to escape. The Red Hood Gang is later seen outside of Bruce's apartment, scoping it out for their next hit. The Red Hood Gang subsequently reappear in the "Zero Year" event's first story arc "Secret City", where Bruce gets involved with the Red Hood Gang to spoil their plans to sink a pickup truck full of men who refused to join their ranks.

==== Red Hood Gang in other media ====
- Two incarnations of the Red Hood Gang appear in Gotham.
  - The first version appears in the episode "Red Hood", consisting of Gus Floyd (portrayed by Michael Goldsmith), Clyde Destro (portrayed by Jonny Coyne), Trope (portrayed by Peter Brensinger), Regan (portrayed by Kevin T. Collins), and Haskins (portrayed by Peter Albrink). Floyd conceives the idea of the Red Hood identity after making a red hooded mask for himself. Following a successful bank robbery, Floyd suggests whoever is wearing the red hood should lead the gang. Destro shoots him and takes the red mask and leadership of the gang for himself until Trope wounds Destro for the mask to impress his girlfriend. However, James Gordon and Harvey Bullock find Destro and force him to reveal his allies' names and their plans. Confronting the Red Hood Gang at the third bank they intended to hit, the GCPD kill Trope, Regan, and Haskins, though a young boy picks up the fallen mask while they are not looking. According to the Gotham Chronicle website, Destro survived and was arrested.
  - A second gang appears in the episode "Mad City: Anything for You", consisting of an unidentified leader (portrayed by Michael Stoyanov) and several unnamed members with Butch Gilzean as their secret benefactor.
- The Red Hood Gang appears in Lego Batman: Legacy of the Dark Knight. This version of the group works under Jack Napier / Red Hood.
- The Red Hood Gang will appear in Dynamic Duo.

=== Red Shadows ===
The Red Shadows are Russia's answer to the Suicide Squad.

=== Relative Heroes ===
Relative Heroes are a family of 5 superpowered children that are orphaned. The team; consisting of Joel (Houston), Aviva (Temper), Damara (Allure), Tyson (Blindside), and Cameron (Omni), travel to Metropolis to find Superman while being chased by government agents. They debuted in a 6-issue limited series in 2000.

=== Robot Renegades ===
The Robot Renegades are a robotic team that seeks the supremacy of machines over humans. They first appeared as a team in Metal Men (vol. 3) #2 (2007). The group consists of U.N.I.O.N., Warbox, Body X, L-Ron, and Manhunter Lud of the Manhunters. In Metal Men (vol. 3) #3, they assist Will Magnus in defeating the Death Metal Men for their own reasons.

== S ==
=== Science Police ===
The Science Police is the name of two police organizations.

In the 30th and 31st centuries, the Science Police has a professional working relationship with the Legion of Super-Heroes, with Shvaughn Erin serving as the Police's liaison to the Legion. Legion member Colossal Boy is a former member of the Science Police.

In the 21st century, the Science Police serve the federal government of the United States and deal with metahuman and alien crimes. Maggie Sawyer is a member of the group.

==== Science Police in other media ====
- The 31st-century incarnation of the Science Police appears in Legion of Super Heroes, with Nemesis Kid as a prominent member.
- The 31st-century incarnation of the Science Police makes a cameo appearance in the Batman: The Brave and the Bold episode "The Siege of Starro!".
- The 21st-century incarnation of the Science Police appears in Supergirl, with Maggie Sawyer as a prominent member. This version is a branch of National City's police department.
- The 21st-century incarnation of the Science Police appears in DC Universe Online.

=== Science Squad ===
The Science Squad is the name of two groups.

==== First Science Squad ====
The first Science Squad are a group of scientists and mad scientists in the DC Comics Universe. The group was created by writer Grant Morrison who stated: "I love writing cowardly, petulant, irascible supervillains much more than I enjoy writing truly evil ones, so this whole plot strand was a joy from beginning to end". The members of the team are Veronica Cale, Doctor Death, Doctor Sivana, I.Q., Will Magnus, T.O. Morrow, Komrade Krabb, Doctor Tyme, and Robby Reed enemies Doctor Cyclops, Baron Bug, and Dr. Rigoro Mortis. They are commanded by Egg Fu. They are featured prominently throughout the series, particularly in issue #46.

==== Second Science Squad ====
In Dark Nights: Metal, a new Science Squad was formed during the invasion of Barbatos. It consists of Doctor Sivana, Egg Fu, Professor Ivo, T.O. Morrow, Veronica Cale, and Will Magnus.

=== S.C.Y.T.H.E. ===
S.C.Y.T.H.E. is a terrorist organization from the fictional European country of Lugwainia.

=== Sentinels of Magic ===
The Sentinels of Magic is a team of supernaturally powered superheroes, described as a loose confederation of mystic defenders. The team was formed during the "Day of Judgment" storyline when the angel Asmodel led a coup against Neron, a powerful demon lord. The team includes occult heroes Zatanna, Enchantress, Madame Xanadu, Blue Devil, Raven, Deadman, Ragman, and Sebastian Faust.

==== Sentinels of Magic in other media ====
- The Sentinels of Magic appear in DC Universe Online, consisting of Doctor Fate, Zatanna, and Raven.
- The Sentinels of Magic appear in Young Justice, consisting of Zatanna, Khalid Nassour, Traci Thurston, and Mary Bromfield.

=== Sex Men ===
The Sex Men are secret agents who investigate areas contaminated by bizarre occurrences. They consist of Cuddle, Kiss, and Torture.

==== Sex Men in other media ====
The Sex Men appear in the Doom Patrol episode "Sex Patrol", with Cuddle portrayed by Michael Shenefelt, Kiss portrayed by Michael Tourek, and Torture portrayed by Tracey Bonner.

=== Sivana Industries ===
Sivana Industries is a company that is owned by Doctor Sivana.

==== Sivana Industries in other media ====
Sivana Industries appears in Shazam!. This version is run by Thaddeus Sivana's unnamed father.

=== Society of Sin ===
See Brotherhood of Evil.

=== Sons of Batman ===
The Sons of Batman are an offshoot of the Mutants that became followers of Batman.

The Sons of Batman were also featured in Batman: Legends of the Dark Knight #21-23 (August – October 1991).

==== Sons of Batman in other media ====
The Sons of Batman appear in Batman: The Dark Knight Returns, with one of its members voiced by Yuri Lowenthal.

=== Sons of Liberty ===
The Sons of Liberty are a top secret government organization that has Agent Liberty as their special operative. Other known members are Charles Holcraft, Paul Devlin, Jay Harriman, Ronald Kramer, Reese, and Sanchez.

In post-DC Rebirth continuity, the Sons of Liberty are a terrorist group. In the publishing line "DC All In", the Sons of Liberty take on an anti-metahuman agenda, driven by Jay Harriman.

==== Sons of Liberty in other media ====
- The Sons of Liberty, renamed "Children of Liberty", appear in the fourth season of Supergirl. This version of the group target alien residents of National City and were manipulated by Lex Luthor.
- An alternate universe iteration of the Sons of Liberty appear in the second season of Peacemaker, with Vigilante as a notable member. This version of the group opposes a Nazi regime.

=== Star Sapphires ===
The Star Sapphires is an organization appearing in American comic books published by DC Comics, they are one of the seven Lantern Corps empowered by a specific color of the emotional spectrum within the DC Universe. Though their roots can be traced back to the earliest appearances of the Star Sapphire queens, they have entered into a significant plot role as part of the 2009–2010 Blackest Night crossover event. First formed by the Zamarons at the conclusion of the Mystery of the Star Sapphire storyline running in Green Lantern (vol. 4) issues #18–20 (May–July 2007), their abilities come from pink power rings which wield the power of love. The members of the Star Sapphires are only depicted as being females; during the Blackest Night panel at the 2009 San Diego Comic-Con, Geoff Johns explained that "anyone can join, but most men are not worthy".

==== Star Sapphires in other media ====
- The Star Sapphires appear in Green Lantern: The Animated Series, with Aga'po, Ghia'ta, Galia, and Carol Ferris as prominent members.
- The Star Sapphires appear in the video game Infinite Crisis.
- The Star Sapphires appear in the video game Lego Batman 3: Beyond Gotham, with Carol Ferris voiced by Olivia d'Abo.
- The Star Sapphires appear in the video game DC Universe Online.
- The Star Sapphires appear in the video game DC Unchained, with Carol Ferris being featured as a playable character.

== T ==
=== Task Force X ===
See Suicide Squad

=== Terrifics ===
The Terrifics are an organization appearing in American comic books published by DC Comics. They debuted during "The New Age of DC Heroes" line in The Terrifics #3 and were created by Jeff Lemire and Ivan Reis.

When Simon Stagg had Metamorpho transmute himself into the Nth Metal in order to access the Dark Multiverse, Mister Terrific and Plastic Man showed up in order to thwart this plan which led to them and Metamorpho being pulled into the Dark Multiverse. They end up meeting a young girl named Phantom Girl and find a hologram from Tom Strong stating that they are needed to save the Dark Multiverse. Once all four of them leave, they are found to be cosmically tethered to each other as a side effect of being in the Dark Multiverse. The group stays together until they can find a way to break the bond and explore the Dark Multiverse.

=== Thunderers of Qward ===
The Thunderers of Qward are flying Qwardian warriors who are equipped with throwable weapons shaped like lightning bolts that turn into a form of energy called "Qwa" when thrown.

==== Thunderers of Qward in other media ====
A Thunderer of Qward appears as a playable character in Lego Batman 3: Beyond Gotham.

=== Time Masters ===
The Time Masters are a team led by Rip Hunter who specialize in protecting the timestream. Their original members also included Hunter's girlfriend Bonnie Baxter, Bonnie's sister Corky Baxter, and Jeff Smith. They would later be replaced by Rip Hunter's second team, the Linear Men.

==== Time Masters in other media ====
The Time Masters appear in Legends of Tomorrow.

== U ==
=== The Untouchables ===
This group first appeared as The Intangibles in DC Comics Presents #58 (June 1983). They were renamed The Untouchables in The Outsiders #2 (December 1985).

== W ==
=== Weaponers of Qward ===
The Weaponers of Qward are Qwardian smiths and engineers that seem to have a military structure. Their most noteworthy warriors are the Thunderers, flying warriors that are equipped with throwable weapons shaped like lightning bolts that turn into a form of energy called "Qwa" when thrown. The Weaponers created a yellow "power ring" for the supervillain Sinestro, a former Green Lantern who had been exiled to their universe for using his power to take over his world.

==== Weaponers of Qward in other media ====
The Weaponers of Qward appear in Green Lantern: First Flight, with one of them voiced by Rob Paulsen. This version of the Weaponers are an insectoid species rather than humanoid and appear to function as a group mind.

== See also ==
- DC Universe
- List of DC Comics characters
- List of DC Comics publications
- List of alien races in DC Comics
- List of criminal organizations in DC Comics
- List of government agencies in DC Comics
- List of Justice League members
- List of Legion of Super-Heroes members
