= Persuader (comics) =

DC Comics supervillain

Publication information
- Publisher: DC Comics
- First appearance: (Ti) Adventure Comics #352 (January 1967) (Parker) The Adventures of Superman #598 (January 2002) (Kimble) Teen Titans (vol. 3) #56 (April 2008)
- Created by: (Ti) Jim Shooter (writer); Curt Swan (artist) (Parker) Joe Casey (writer); Pete Woods (artist) (Kimble) Sean McKeever (writer); Eddy Barrows (artist)

In-story information
- Alter ego: Nyeun Chun Ti; Cole Parker; Elise Kimble
- Team affiliations: (Ti) Fatal Five; Legion of Super-Villains (Parker) Suicide Squad (Kimble) Terror Titans; Legion of Doom
- Abilities: Enhanced physical capabilities; Wields atomic axe that can cut through anything

Persuader is the name of three unrelated supervillains appearing in comic books published by DC Comics. The first, Nyeun Chun Ti, is a 31st-century criminal, founding member of the Fatal Five, and enemy of the Legion of Super-Heroes. The second and third are Cole Parker and Elise Kimble, contemporary humans who are respectively members of the Suicide Squad and Terror Titans.

The Nyeun Chun Ti incarnation of Persuader has appeared in various media adaptations featuring the Legion of Super-Heroes. He is voiced by David Sobolov in Legion of Super Heroes (2006) and portrayed by Frasier Aitcheson in Smallville.

== Publication history ==
The Nyeun Chun Ti incarnation of Persuader first appeared in Adventure Comics #352 (January 1967), and was created by writer Jim Shooter and artist Curt Swan.

The Cole Parker incarnation of Persuader first appeared in The Adventures of Superman #598 (January 2002), and was created by writer Joe Casey and artist Pete Woods.

The Elise Kimble incarnation of Persuader first appeared in Teen Titans (vol. 3) #56 (April 2008) and was created by writer Sean McKeever and artist Eddy Barrows.

== Fictional character biography ==
=== Nyeun Chun Ti ===
The Persuader is one of five outlaws who are recruited by the Legion of Super-Heroes to help them combat the Sun-Eater in exchange for amnesty. The villains turn on the Legion and form the Fatal Five, becoming one of the Legion's enemies.

The Persuader wields an "atomic axe" resembling a halberd that he can control mentally. The axe is alleged to be able to cut through anything, occasionally including purely metaphoric or intangible things, such as air supply, the force of gravity, and the barriers between dimensions. Before becoming a supervillain, he was a gang enforcer who gained the Persuader moniker from his ability to thoroughly intimidate others.

The Persuader's backstory is not significantly changed following the Zero Hour: Crisis in Time! and "Threeboot" relaunches, which rebooted the Legion's continuity. In the Teen Titans/Legion crossover that ended the post-Zero Hour continuity, the Persuader uses his axe to cut through Hypertime, bringing together versions of the Fatal Five from other universes as the Fatal Five Hundred.

In Final Crisis: Legion of 3 Worlds, Persuader joins Superboy-Prime's Legion of Super-Villains.

=== Cole Parker ===
Cole Parker is a factory worker who lost his job in the wake of Brainiac upgrading the technology of Metropolis. Inspired by images of Superman fighting the Fatal Five, Parker leads a riot against the Daily Planet, but is thwarted and imprisoned.

A mysterious stranger appears in Cole's cell and gives him an Atomic Axe to help him fulfill his need for vengeance. Parker escapes prison and battles Superman, but disappears after entering a dimensional portal that he created. The Mxyzptlk Twins decide to rewrite history so it was they who supplied the axe.

Parker later joins the Suicide Squad. During a mission, he is accidentally killed by Osiris, who flies through his body while saving Isis.

=== Elise Kimble ===
Elise Kimble is a member of the Terror Titans led by Clock King, who believes her to be an ancestor of the 31st-century Persuader. She was raised by her mother after her father left the family when she was young. Growing up with a spiteful mother turned her cold, and Elise became an assassin-for-hire while still in high school, eventually killing her mother when she learned of her activities. She joined up with Clock King to find her father. Clock King locates Elise's father and brings him to her, only to kill him during their reunion to toughen her up.

Along with the other surviving Terror Titans, Elise is defeated and turned over to the authorities after the prisoners of the Dark Side Club are freed by Ravager and Miss Martian. While being transported by the police, the Terror Titans escape and flee to parts unknown.

Elise reappears in Teen Titans #98 as part of Superboy-Prime's Legion of Doom. While battling Rose Wilson, Elise taunts her and claims that she must have an ulterior motive for joining the Teen Titans. Elise is ultimately defeated after being shot with an arrow by Speedy, allowing Rose to knock her out.

== Powers and abilities ==
All three incarnations of Persuader wield an "atomic axe" resembling a halberd that can cut through anything, occasionally including purely metaphoric or intangible things, such as air, the force of gravity, and the barrier between dimensions.

The Nyeun Chun Ti incarnation of Persuader originates from a planet with high gravity; as a result, all of his physical capabilities such as strength and endurance are greatly enhanced.

== In other media ==
=== Television ===
The Persuader as he appears in Smallville.

- The Nyeun Chun Ti incarnation of the Persuader appears in the Justice League Unlimited episode "Far From Home", voiced by an uncredited Kin Shriner. This version is a member of the Fatal Five.
- The Nyeun Chun Ti incarnation of the Persuader appears in Legion of Super Heroes, voiced by David Sobolov. This version is a member of the Fatal Five.
- The Nyeun Chun Ti incarnation of the Persuader appears in the Smallville episode "Legion", portrayed by an uncredited Fraser Aitcheson. This version is a xenophobic member of a future "human supremacist" movement.

=== Film ===
The Nyeun Chun Ti incarnation of the Persuader appears in Justice League vs. the Fatal Five, voiced by Matthew Yang King. This version is a member of the Fatal Five.

=== Video games ===
The Nyeun Chun Ti incarnation of the Persuader appears as a character summon in Scribblenauts Unmasked: A DC Comics Adventure.
