= Nemesis Kid =

DC Comics character

- Nemesis Kid as depicted in Who's Who in the DC Universe #16 (June 1986). Art by Curt Swan and Kyle Baker.

Publication information
- Publisher: DC Comics
- First appearance: Adventure Comics #346 (July 1966)
- Created by: Jim Shooter

In-story information
- Alter ego: Hart Druiter
- Species: Metahuman
- Place of origin: Myar (31st century)
- Team affiliations: Legion of Super-Heroes; Legion of Super-Villains
- Abilities: Spontaneously develops powers to defeat a single opponent

Nemesis Kid (Hart Druiter) is a supervillain in the DC Comics universe. He originates from the planet Myar in the 31st century and is an enemy of the Legion of Super-Heroes. Nemesis Kid was introduced in the storyline "One of Us Is a Traitor", where he applied to join the Legion before being exposed as an infiltrator.

== Publication history ==
Nemesis Kid was created by Jim Shooter, and first appeared in Adventure Comics #346 (July 1966).

== Fictional character biography ==
In his first appearance, Hart Druiter applies to join the Legion of Super-Heroes, along with Princess Projectra, Karate Kid, and Ferro Lad. He identifies himself as a native of the planet Myar and claims to derive his powers from a mystical potion that he created. Druiter is later revealed to be a traitor who infiltrated the Legion of Super-Heroes on behalf of the Khunds. When his deception is revealed, Druiter attempts to frame Karate Kid as the traitor and flees after his plan fails.

Nemesis Kid becomes a founding member of the Legion of Super-Villains under Tarik the Mute. He leads the Legion in invading the planet Orando and engages Karate Kid in single combat. Karate Kid sacrifices himself to stop the Legion's plans, dealing Nemesis Kid a final blow. Karate Kid's widow, Queen Projectra, attacks Nemesis Kid and kills him by breaking his neck.

Nemesis Kid is resurrected following the "Threeboot" continuity reboot. He is depicted as a member of the Wanderers, a superhero team founded by the United Planets.

== Powers and abilities ==
Nemesis Kid possesses the superhuman ability to spontaneously develop the powers appropriate to defeat any opponent for the duration of the battle, with no defined limit. Against more than one opponent, his powers either work against only one target, allow him to escape via teleportation, or fail to work at all. Additionally, he has a passing knowledge of 30th-century technology, tactics, and strategy.

== In other media ==
- Nemesis Kid appears in Legion of Super Heroes, voiced by Keith Ferguson. This version is a member of the Science Police and the Legion of Super-Heroes who possesses the ability to nullify superpowers.
- Nemesis Kid appears in Legion of Super Heroes in the 31st Century #18.
