= Fatal Five =

DC Comics supervillain group

- Cover art for Legion of Super-Heroes (vol. 4) #120, featuring four of the Fatal Five with Brainiac 5 and Gates, by Phil Jimenez.

Publication information
- Publisher: DC Comics
- First appearance: Adventure Comics #352 (January 1967)
- Created by: Jim Shooter

In-story information
- Member(s): Founders: Emerald Empress; Mano; Persuader; Tharok; Validus; Substitutes: Flare; Caress; Mentalla; Mordecai

The Fatal Five is a supervillain team of the 30th century in the DC Comics universe. They were created by Jim Shooter and first appeared in Adventure Comics #352 (1967) as enemies of the Legion of Super-Heroes.

== Fictional team history ==
Cover to Adventure Comics #352, art by Curt Swan.

The Fatal Five first appear in The Death of Ferro Lad story arc, as a band of criminals whom the Legion recruited to help destroy the Sun-Eater, consisting of the Emerald Empress, Mano, the Persuader, and Validus, and led by Tharok. The five are offered pardons for their assistance, but reject them and band together, confident that they are powerful enough to try to conquer the worlds they had saved.

A later incarnation consisted of the Emerald Empress; the Persuader; Flare, a Rimborian with the power of fire; Caress, who has a deadly acidic touch; and Mentalla, a Legion reject who is secretly working against the Five, trying to secure a spot in the Legion.

The 1993 series Legionnaires has the SW6 Legion face a Fatal Five comprising Tharok, Mano, the Persuader, a new Emerald Empress, and a monstrous being called Mordecai.

=== Zero Hour ===
Following Zero Hour: Crisis in Time!, which reboots the Legion's continuity, the original Fatal Five are reintroduced in Legion of Super-Heroes (vol. 4) #78 (1996), again assembled to help fight the Sun-Eater, which was later revealed to not exist. In this incarnation, the Emerald Empress is simply called the "Empress" and is more a skilled melee combatant than a magic user.

In the Teen Titans/Legion of Super-Heroes crossover, the Persuader uses his atomic axe to recruit alternate universe versions of the Fatal Five, forming the Fatal Five-Hundred, before the two teams use the Cosmic Treadmill to return them to their original universes.

All five Fatal Five members were among the supervillains in Superman-Prime's Legion of Super-Villains.

=== DC Rebirth ===
In DC Rebirth, the Emerald Empress comes to the 21st century to destroy Saturn Girl, only to also fight Supergirl. To combat Supergirl after failing to take her down on her own, she forms a version of the Fatal Five consisting of Magog, Brainiac 8, the sorceress Selena, and a clone of Solomon Grundy.

== Members ==
=== Emerald Empress ===
The Emerald Empress is a native of the planet Venegar who wields the Emerald Eye of Ekron, a magical artifact with immense power. The Eye is virtually indestructible and can project powerful energy blasts, generate force fields, hypnotize others, cast illusions, teleport over short distances, and alter reality.

=== Mano ===
Mano is a mutant born with the power to disintegrate anything that he touches by generating antimatter from his right hand. A native of the polluted world Angtu, Mano must wear an environment suit because he can not breathe the atmosphere of most other planets. The suit's helmet obscures his face so that it can only be seen as a silhouette. Hating his people for mistreating him, Mano decided to destroy them all; "straining his power to the utmost", he obliterated Angtu, causing it to explode.

Following the Zero Hour reboot of the Legion, Mano was reintroduced, with his origin altered; while he still destroyed his planet, the inhabitants had already been killed by chemical weaponry. He then sought revenge on industrialist Leland McCauley, who had sold the weapons. While Mano later became a more conventional supervillain, his priority remained revenge on McCauley, and he continued to disapprove of the destruction of innocents, something that sometimes set him against the other members of the Five.

=== Persuader (Nyeun Chun Ti) ===
The Persuader originates from a high-gravity planet, and thus possesses enhanced physical abilities. Before becoming a supervillain, he was a gang enforcer and gained the Persuader moniker from his ability to intimidate others.

The Persuader wields an "atomic axe" on a long shaft, resembling a halberd. It is mentally linked to him and can cut through anything, occasionally including purely metaphoric or intangible things such as air, the force of gravity, and the barrier between dimensions.

=== Tharok ===
Tharok is a small-time crook who attempted to impress his superiors by stealing a small nuclear device. When the police fired on Tharok, the device detonated unexpectedly, vertically bisecting his body. Tharok is converted into a cyborg, which greatly boosts his intelligence but leaves his evil tendencies unchecked.

One of the Fatal Five's main attempts to defeat the Legion is masterminded by the Dark Man, a clone of Tharok. Tharok and the Dark Man are seemingly killed, resulting in the Fatal Five disbanding. Tharok is resurrected following the Zero Hour: Crisis in Time! event, which rebooted the Legion's continuity. In this continuity, Tharok stole a powerful solvent rather than a nuclear device. When the police shot at him, the container was punctured, with the solvent cutting Tharok's body in two. Tharok was healed and converted into a cyborg by an unnamed surgeon, who he subsequently killed.

==== Powers and abilities of Tharok ====
The entire left side of Tharok's body is mechanical. It possesses great strength and durability and the arm can be configured into various weapon forms. Tharok's mechanical half has a cybernetic brain that is connected to Tharok's own, giving him genius-level intelligence.

=== Validus ===
Validus is a monstrous member of the Fatal Five who possesses superhuman strength and durability and the ability to generate electricity. During one memorable altercation with the Legion, Validus killed Lyle Norg, the first Invisible Kid. Validus is later revealed to be Garridan Ranzz, the son of Lightning Lad and Saturn Girl. Darkseid kidnapped Garridan shortly after his birth, transformed him into a monster, and transported him back in time, where he became a member of the Fatal Five. Validus is nearly mindless, making him easily controlled by the likes of the Emerald Empress and Tharok.

Darkseid manipulates Validus against Lightning Lad, placing him in a situation where the Legionnaire would be forced to kill him to save the life of his other son, Graym. Thanks to the efforts of Saturn Girl, the plot is averted and she and Lightning Lad discover that Validus is their child. Soon after, Darkseid returns Validus to his original form.

Darkseid's tampering with Garridan's body chemistry creates a virus dubbed the Validus Plague, which only affects natives of Winath and Titan (the homeworlds of Garridan's parents). As a result, Garridan is forced to wear a containment suit, allowing him mobility yet keeping him in medical quarantine.

In the "Threeboot" continuity, Validus is a nature spirit from Winath who is known as the Lord of Lightning. Mekt Ranzz is part of a cult that worships him. Furthermore, Garridan Ranzz appears as a separate entity, depicted as a child who was never transformed into Validus.

==== Powers and abilities of Validus ====
Validus possesses immense strength and durability, enabling him to easily overpower Superboy. Superboy estimated that Validus is 12 times as strong as him. In addition, Validus can generate energy bolts from his brain that are powerful enough to incapacitate a Kryptonian or Daxamite with a single hit.

== Other versions ==
- An alternate universe iteration of the Fatal Five appears in Tangent Comics, consisting of Ice, Shadow Thief, Kid Psycho, Deathstroke, and Count Viper.
- An alternate universe iteration of the Fatal Five, amalgamated with Marvel Comics characters, appears in the Amalgam Comics one-shot Spider-Boy Team-Up, consisting of Agamotto Empress, Manorb, Sparticus, Tharlock, and Valinus.

== In other media ==
=== Television ===
- The original Fatal Five appear in the Justice League Unlimited episode "Far From Home", with Cara Kesh/Emerald Empress voiced by Joanne Whalley, Tharok by Tomas Arana, Persuader by an uncredited Kin Shriner, and Mano and Validus having no dialogue.
- The original Fatal Five appear in Legion of Super Heroes, with Sarya/Emerald Empress voiced by Jennifer Hale in the first season and Tara Strong in the second, Tharok by David Lodge, Persuader by David Sobolov, and Mano and Validus having no dialogue. This version of the group is co-led by the Emerald Empress and Tharok. In the second season, Imperiex frees the Fatal Five from prison, taking in Validus and Persuader, while Emerald Empress loses her powers and is abandoned by the rest of the Fatal Five after Matter-Eater Lad destroys the Emerald Eye of Ekron.

=== Film ===
The original Fatal Five appear in Justice League vs. the Fatal Five, with Emerald Empress voiced by Sumalee Montano, Tharok by Peter Jessop, Mano by Philip Anthony-Rodriguez, Persuader by Matthew Yang King, and Validus having no dialogue. After the Emerald Empress and Validus are taken to the 21st century to be imprisoned in Oa, Tharok, Mano, and Persuader travel back in time to force Jessica Cruz to lead them to their missing teammates. While fighting the Justice League and Star Boy, the Fatal Five are buried alive by Cruz.

=== Video games ===
The original Fatal Five appear as character summons in Scribblenauts Unmasked: A DC Comics Adventure.

=== Miscellaneous ===
- Happy Meal figurines of the Fatal Five were released as a tie-in to the Legion of Super Heroes animated series.
- The Fatal Five appear in Legion of Super Heroes in the 31st Century.
