= Saturn Girl =

Fictional DC Comics character

- Saturn Girl as depicted on the cover of Final Crisis: Legion of 3 Worlds #2 (October 2008). Art by George Pérez.

Publication information
- Publisher: DC Comics
- First appearance: Adventure Comics #247 (April 1958)
- Created by: Otto Binder; Al Plastino

In-story information
- Alter ego: Imra Ardeen
- Species: Titanian
- Place of origin: Titan
- Team affiliations: Legion of Super-Heroes
- Abilities: Powers: Telepathy; Telepathic illusions; Telepathic camouflage; Telepathic communication, perception, and reception; Telepathic defense; Mental senses; Mind control; Psychic link; Empathy; Psionic shield; Psionic blast; Abilities: Basic hand-to-hand combatant; Leadership skills; Equipment: Legion Flight Ring

Saturn Girl (Imra Ardeen) is a superheroine appearing in comics published by DC Comics. A talented telepath from the 30th century, Saturn Girl is a founding member of the Legion of Super-Heroes. Imra's "Saturn Girl" title refers to her homeworld of Titan, Saturn's largest moon. There have been three versions of Imra since her original debut, separated by the events of the limited series Zero Hour: Crisis in Time! and Infinite Crisis.

Saturn Girl has appeared in various media outside comics, primarily those featuring the Legion of Super-Heroes. Kari Wahlgren voiced her in the animated series Legion of Super Heroes (2006), and reprised the role in Young Justice. In live-action, Saturn Girl has been portrayed by Alexz Johnson and Amy Jackson in Smallville and Supergirl respectively.

== Publication history ==
Saturn Girl first appeared in Adventure Comics #247 (April 1958), and was created by Otto Binder and Al Plastino.

== Fictional character biography ==
=== Silver Age ===
Saturn Girl in her Bronze Age variant uniform

During the Silver Age of comics, 30th-century Earth is a member of the United Planets and home to its military branch, the Science Police. As a teenager, Imra Ardeen leaves Titan to join the Police, during which she, Rokk Krinn, and Garth Ranzz foil an assassination attempt on fellow passenger and billionaire R. J. Brande. At Brande's urging, the three form the Legion of Super-Heroes, inspired by the legacy of Superboy, who they later recruit from the 20th century.

Just before the leadership elections of 2975, Saturn Girl learns that a Legionnaire would die during an attack on Earth and decides to take on that responsibility herself. Using her telepathy, Imra forces the other Legionnaires to vote her leader and then orders them not to use their powers during the attack, preventing them from rescuing her. However, Lightning Lad defies her orders and dies in her place. Saturn Girl attempts to sacrifice herself to resurrect Lightning Lad, but her plan is foiled by Proty, the pet of Chameleon Boy, who dies instead.

Romantically, Lightning Lad (Garth Ranzz) had pursued Imra for some time, but she had repeatedly rebuffed his advances. After he sacrificed his life for her own, she understood the depth of his feelings and came to realize that she returned them. After dating for almost ten years, Garth proposes marriage, but Imra initially rejects his offer due to a Legion rule which prevents members from being married and remaining in active duty at the same time. Sometime after consulting with her mentors on Titan, Imra relents and marries Garth. Several months later, all active Legionnaires are captured and the reserves are forced into action. Imra's telepathic skills are instrumental in the Legion's eventual victory, and as a result the rule barring married members is repealed. Imra and Garth return to active duty until Imra gave birth to their son, Graym, after which they both retire to raise him. Unbeknown to the couple, Graym had a twin, Garridan, who was stolen at birth by Darkseid and transported into the past, where he was transformed into the monster Validus. After learning that Validus is her son, Saturn Girl convinces Darkseid to return him to his original form.

Saturn Girl rejoins the Legion after helping stop Universo from conquering Earth. During the "Five Year Gap", Earth's government becomes hostile to the Legion, and Garth is incapacitated by a Winathian plague. Disillusioned by the government and feeling needed more at home, Imra resigns from the Legion and returns to Winath to become a farmer. She and Garth have two additional children, daughters Dacey and Dorritt.

=== Post-Zero Hour ===
Saturn Girl in her post Zero-Hour uniform. Art by Jeff Moy.

After the reboot of the Legion in Zero Hour: Crisis in Time!, Imra remains known as Saturn Girl, and a founder of the Legion along with Cosmic Boy and Live Wire. Her design was changed from previous versions, combining some elements from past uniforms. The top and pants of her uniform are similar in design to her red and white uniform, but now colored pink instead of red, and has the familiar Saturn logo.

Following Invisible Kid's resignation, Saturn Girl becomes the leader of the Legion of Super-Heroes. Later, following Lightning Lad's death, she resigns and returns to Titan to undergo therapy before Lightning Lad is resurrected in a crystal clone of Element Lad's body.

=== "Threeboot" ===
In the "Threeboot" continuity, Saturn Girl and other Titanians only communicate telepathically, having lost use of their vocal cords due to centuries of evolution. She is still able to read minds, but cannot express herself in spoken language, which puts her at a disadvantage in those situations where her telepathy is useless.

The Threeboot incarnation of Saturn Girl is depicted as weaker than previous incarnations; she is unable to probe shielded minds and must concentrate to exert direct influence on an opponent's brain. As described by Princess Projectra, Titanian telepathy involves manipulating higher brain functions, and Imra is powerless against mental attacks dealt directly to her subconscious.

=== Post-Infinite Crisis ===
The events of Infinite Crisis restore an analogue of the pre-Crisis on Infinite Earths Legion to continuity. Writer Geoff Johns commented on the character:

Saturn Girl is the heart and soul of the Legion of Super-Heroes. When everybody's saying, 'Legion doesn't work anymore. There's too much xenophobia. You can't change people'. Saturn Girl says, 'Yes, you can'. Then suddenly, you realize she can read people's minds. She knows everyone's deepest darkest secrets. If she has faith, then at the base level, human beings and aliens and everybody can reach that goal, can reach achievement and have that goodness inside them. I believe her. I'm with her. And that's why Saturn Girl is so important to the Legion. She's at the epicention of truth for the entire universe for me.

=== DC Rebirth ===
In DC Universe: Rebirth, a mysterious blonde woman (presumably Saturn Girl) is seen during a police interrogation. She has been arrested for stealing a sandwich. Even though she is told that Superman is missing and possibly dead, she smiles and replies that everything will be all right as she has seen it in the future. After the interrogation, the police officers call mental services for her. In the last panel of this scene, it is revealed that the only item in her possession is a Legion flight ring. In the "I Am Suicide" story arc of Batman, she is incarcerated in Arkham Asylum. Here, Batman and two others walk by a cell housing the blonde woman who breaths on the glass of her cell and draws the Legion of Super-Heroes symbol in the condensation. DC Comics editor Dan DiDio confirmed that the mysterious woman is indeed Saturn Girl.

In Doomsday Clock, Saturn Girl escapes from Arkham alongside Rorschach (Reggie Long). After the escape, she reveals that she is Saturn Girl. They eventually find and save Johnny Thunder, who just found Alan Scott's green lantern and had thugs assault him, at an old steel mill. Shortly afterward, Saturn Girl is erased from existence due to Doctor Manhattan altering the timeline. Saturn Girl is resurrected after Manhattan undoes his alterations to the timeline, restoring the Legion of Super-Heroes and the Justice Society of America.

== Powers and abilities ==
Saturn Girl is a Titanian who possesses innate telepathic abilities, enabling her to sense and manipulate minds and generate illusions and blasts of psychic energy. As a member of the Legion of Super-Heroes, she is provided a Legion Flight Ring, which allows her to fly and protects her from the vacuum of space and other dangerous environments.

== Other versions ==
- An unnamed girl inspired by Saturn Girl appears in The Dark Knight Strikes Again.
- Psi-Girl, a fusion of Saturn Girl and Marvel Comics character Psylocke, appears in the Amalgam Comics one-shot Spider-Boy Team-Up.

== Reception ==
=== Accolades ===
- In 2011, Comics Buyer's Guide ranked Saturn Girl 50th in their "100 Sexiest Women in Comics" list.
- In 2019, CBR ranked Saturn Girl 3rd in their "10 Most Powerful Telepaths" list, the highest rank for a female character.

== In other media ==
=== Television ===
Saturn Girl as she appears in Superman: The Animated Series (left), Smallville (center), and Legion of Super-Heroes (2006) (right)
- Saturn Girl appears in the Superman: The Animated Series episode "New Kids in Town", voiced by Melissa Joan Hart.
- Saturn Girl appears in the Smallville episode "Legion", portrayed by Alexz Johnson.
- Saturn Girl makes a non-speaking appearance in the Justice League Unlimited episode "Far From Home".
- Saturn Girl appears in Legion of Super-Heroes (2006), voiced by Kari Wahlgren. This version sports pink eyes and the additional ability to enter a healing trance while unconscious.
- Saturn Girl appears in Young Justice, voiced again by Kari Wahlgren.
- Imra Ardeen appears in the third season of Supergirl, portrayed by Amy Jackson. This version possesses telekinesis in addition to telepathy, had a sister named Preya who was killed by a Worldkiller called Blight, and married Mon-El to secure an alliance between Earth and Titan before they eventually break up.

=== Film ===
- Saturn Girl appears in Lego DC Comics Super Heroes: Justice League – Cosmic Clash, voiced again by Kari Wahlgren. This version comes from a future Earth that Brainiac conquered by the year 2116.
- Saturn Girl appears in Justice League vs. the Fatal Five, voiced by Tara Strong.
- Saturn Girl makes a non-speaking cameo appearance in Legion of Super-Heroes (2023).
- The Legion of Super Heroes (2006) incarnation of Saturn Girl makes a non-speaking cameo appearance in Scooby-Doo! and Krypto, Too!.

=== Video games ===
- Saturn Girl appears in DC Universe Online.
- Saturn Girl appears as a character summon in Scribblenauts Unmasked: A DC Comics Adventure.
- Saturn Girl makes a non-speaking cameo appearance in Brainiac's ending in Injustice 2.

=== Miscellaneous ===
- Saturn Girl appears in Adventures in the DC Universe #10.
- Saturn Girl appears in the one-shot comic Batman '66 Meets the Legion of Super-Heroes.
