= The Terra Mosaic =

Comic story arc featuring the Legion of Super-Heroes

- Publisher: DC Comics
- Publication date: January – Late November 1992
- Genre: Science fiction, superhero
- Title(s): Legion of Super-Heroes vol. 4, #25-36
- Main character(s): Legion of Super-Heroes; Dominators; Legion of Substitute Heroes; Universo

Creative team
- Writer(s): Keith Giffen; Tom and Mary Bierbaum
- Penciller(s): Jason Pearson and others
- Inker(s): Al Gordon; Karl Story et al.
- Editor: Michael Eury

"The Terra Mosaic" is a story arc that was published by DC Comics, and presented in Legion of Super-Heroes vol. 4, #25-36 (January – Late November 1992). It was written by Keith Giffen and Tom and Mary Bierbaum, and was pencilled primarily by Jason Pearson. The story arc takes place during the "Five Years Later" period of the Legion of Super-Heroes' original continuity. It features the introduction of "Batch SW6" — time-displaced duplicates of the regular, adult version of the Legion — who become key participants in a war to free Earth from the control of the Dominators.

== Plot ==
In the year 2995, teenage Daily Planet journalist Devlin O'Ryan, who has been accompanying the recently reconstituted Legion of Super-Heroes, (Note: The Legion disbanded during the five-year period following the "Magic Wars" which occurred in Legion of Super-Heroes vol. 3, #60-63 (May–August 1989). The team officially reformed in Legion of Super-Heroes vol. 4, #12 (October 1990).) is seriously wounded by Dominion soldiers. (Note: Devlin's injuries are revealed in Legion of Super-Heroes vol. 4, #20 (July 1991).) While hiding in Metropolis, he encounters 20 teenagers who appear to be the members of the Legion, from the time period immediately following the team's first encounter with Universo. (Note: The Legion first battled Universo in Adventure Comics #349 (October 1966). In the following issue, Star Boy and Dream Girl rejoined the team under the aliases "Sir Prize" and "Miss Terious", but the two are not included in Batch SW6.) (Note: Because of the alterations to the timeline following the events of Legion of Super-Heroes vol. 4, #4-5 (February–March 1990), Superboy is removed from continuity, Supergirl is replaced by Laurel Gand, and Mon-El is renamed Valor.) It becomes apparent that the group was part of a secret Dominion project called Batch SW6, and that their last memories are from 17 years in the past. After Devlin convinces the skeptical Legionnaires that Earth is now under the covert control of the Dominators, team leader Invisible Kid (Lyle Norg) accepts his suggestion that the group join the underground resistance, (Note: Invisible Kid was elected team leader in Adventure Comics #348 (September 1966).) led by Jacques Foccart (the former Legionnaire who became the second Invisible Kid) and Universo. During a brief skirmish, Devlin learns that he has the metahuman ability to reflect energy.

In an attempt to retrieve Batch SW6, the Dominators unleash B.I.O.N., an advanced android with the powers of the Legionnaires. The unit instead engages the adult Legion at their headquarters on the planet Talus. B.I.O.N. is eventually defeated, and Brainiac 5 discovers that it was created using the Computo matrix. (Note: Brainiac 5 created Computo in Adventure Comics #340 (January 1966).) While attempting to liberate underground Dominion chambers beneath Metropolis, the resistance (which includes former members of the Legion of Substitute Heroes) discovers numerous metahumans, including assassin/teleporter Monica Sade. They also discover a critically wounded Dirk Morgna (the former Sun Boy), (Note: Dirk's powers began to destroy his body following the explosion of the Metropolis powersphere in Legion of Super-Heroes vol. 4, #19 (June 1991). The explosion itself was a direct consequence of the destruction of Earth's Moon in Adventures of Superman #478 (May 1991).) (Note: Dirk's condition is revealed in Legion of Super-Heroes vol. 4, #20 (July 1991).) who had been presumed dead.

Earth President Tayla Wellington grows tired of collaborating with the Dominators. When she pleads with other worlds for assistance, a Dominion soldier assassinates her during a live galaxy-wide video broadcast. After rioting breaks out across the planet, the Dominators openly attack several cities from space, killing thousands. As a result, the United Planets declares war on the Dominion, hoping to reclaim Earth. When the SW6 Legionnaires discover that Universo has been secretly working with the Dark Circle, they leave his compound and join Jacques Foccart's faction of the resistance. Dirk Morgna's lover Circe and Legion associate Bounty infiltrate Earthgov headquarters, (Note: Circe is not to be confused with the sorceress Circe, an enemy of Wonder Woman.) where they are later joined by Sussa Paka (Spider Girl). Meanwhile, Jan Arrah (the former Element Lad) learns that his former lover Shvaughn Erin is transgender after she is deprived of the medicine she had been using to become male.

The Earth-based Dominion troops find their resources cut off when their homeworld Elia is attacked by an unknown alien force. The SW6 Legion works with Troy Stewart (the former Tyroc) and the resistance to stage a massive ruse which permits them to rescue the freedom fighters trapped at the underground chambers in Metropolis. However, Grinn — a resistance member loyal to Universo — activates the chambers' self-destruct device, killing the metahumans in the Dominion pods. In the ensuing explosion, the SW6 versions of Karate Kid, Princess Projectra and Chameleon Boy are killed. A furious Sade kills Grinn. Searching the wreckage, the young Legionnaires locate several survivors, including sorcerer Xao Jin, Jacques' younger sister Danielle Foccart, the feline metahuman April Dumaka, and the Crystal Kid. As the Dark Circle agent working with Universo is about to signal his allies to attack Earth, Universo uses his hypnotism powers to force the man to shoot himself in the head. Circe (the former commander of Science Police Earth) uploads a virus into the Earthgov computer network, eventually purging the entire Dominator military intelligence database.

Upon meeting the adult Valor, Sade chastises him for not using his abilities to quickly defeat the Dominators and end the war. He tells an unconvinced Sade that the people of Earth must win the war for themselves, to preserve their collective spirit. Jan Arrah comes to the same conclusion at first, but then changes his mind and joins the fight. The SW6 Laurel Gand captures Pinnacle Command, the Dominion field commander. Her teammates discover the adult Dirk Morgna — who survived the destruction of the chambers, but remains in pain as he burns alive. With a global uprising in process and the Presidential Palace in resistance hands, U.P. officials convince Pinnacle Command to surrender.

Earth is named a United Planets protectorate, and the U.P. Council names Jacques the planet's acting president. Pinnacle Command is taken to Weber's World to stand trial for crimes against humanity. At Legion headquarters on Talus, Bounty tries to apprehend Sade and secure the billion-credit bounty on her head, but Sade critically injures her in a shootout. The adult Brainiac 5 confirms that Bounty was an alien entity inhabiting Dawnstar. Horrified by the continuing agony experienced by Dirk, Circe kills him and herself. Privately, Universo and Leland McCauley take delight in using the war to advance their agendas.

== Aftermath ==
The SW6 Valor attempts to travel back in time to determine which Legion is the "real" one. After his younger counterpart in the 20th century is murdered by Glorith, he replaces him to keep the space-time continuum from collapsing. Mere weeks after the liberation of Earth, the planet is destroyed in a disaster reminiscent of the destruction of Krypton in the 20th century. Two billion people are killed. (Note: The destruction of Krypton is first depicted in Action Comics #1 (June 1938).) The surviving 94 cities are reconstituted as New Earth. With Reep Daggle (the former Chameleon Boy) serving as adult advisor, the SW6 Legion settles on New Earth, excavating the original Legion Clubhouse and using it once again as their headquarters. April Dumaka, Danielle Foccart, and Xao Jin join their ranks as Catspaw, Computo, and Dragonmage. A number of the SW6 Legionnaires adopt new code names. (Note: Lightning Lad becomes Live Wire, Phantom Girl becomes Apparition, Colossal Boy becomes Leviathan, Sun Boy becomes Inferno, Element Lad becomes Alchemist, Light Lass becomes Gossamer, Laurel Gand becomes Andromeda, Ferro Lad shortens his name to Ferro, and Duo Damsel (the former Triplicate Girl) discovers that her third body is still alive and becomes Triad. – Legion of Super-Heroes vol. 4, #41 (March 1993); Legionnaires #1 (April 1993)) Meanwhile, Troy Stewart becomes president of New Earth when Jacques Foccart resigns from office and rejoins the adult Legion.

== Post-Infinite Crisis ==
In the aftermath of the Infinite Crisis miniseries, most of the Legion's original continuity is restored, (Note: The restoration of the original continuity was confirmed in the "Lightning Saga" and "Superman and the Legion of Super-Heroes" story arcs of 2007 and 2008.) but the events of the "Five Years Later" era are not. Thus, the events of "The Terra Mosaic" are apocryphal. Despite it, the Legionnaires from the "Five Years Later" era appear briefly when multiple versions of the Legion battle Superboy-Prime, the Time Trapper, and the Legion of Super-Villains.
