= Composite Superman =

DC Comics supervillain, an enemy of Superman and Batman

- Composite Superman as depicted in World's Finest Comics #283 (1982). Art by Rich Buckler and Frank Giacoia.

Publication information
- Publisher: DC Comics
- First appearance: World's Finest Comics #142 (1964)
- Created by: Edmond Hamilton (writer); Curt Swan (artist)

In-story information
- Alter ego: First - Joseph Meach; Second - Xan
- Notable aliases: Xan - Amalgamax
- Abilities: Possesses the combined powers of Superman and many members of the Legion of Super-Heroes.

The Composite Superman is a supervillain, an enemy of Superman and Batman. There have been several versions of the character; the original version first appeared in World's Finest Comics #142 (June 1964) and was created by Edmond Hamilton and Curt Swan.

== Fictional character biography ==
=== Joseph Meach ===
Joseph Meach was a diver who had fallen on hard times. In an attempt to draw publicity to himself, Meach set up a water tank on a sidewalk in Metropolis and dove off a building. Unbeknownst to Meach, the tank was leaking and Meach would have died if not for the intervention of Superman. Upon learning of Meach's misfortunes, Superman obtained a job for him at the Superman Museum, where Meach was employed as a janitor. Meach's bitterness did not subside and being surrounded by mementos of Superman's career directed his anger towards Superman. One night, as Meach was sweeping in front of a series of statuettes depicting the Legion of Super-Heroes, a bolt of lightning struck the display. The statuettes (which were actually miniature lifeless duplicates of the Legionnaires) unleashed an energy blast that struck Meach, endowing him with the combined powers of the Legion members. Determined to defeat Superman, Batman, and Robin, Meach used his shapeshifting power to turn his skin green and form a costume that was half of Superman's costume and half of Batman's costume. Calling himself the Composite Superman, Meach left a message in both heroes' bases to meet him on a mountain. There, he told the heroes that if he was not allowed to join their team, he would expose their secret identities, which he had learned via telepathy. The Composite Superman then created situations for Superman or Batman to handle, but which he intentionally sabotaged to humiliate the heroes, then sorted them out himself. Superman and Batman's attempt to expose him by using robot duplicates failed, due to the Composite Superman's ability to read their minds. Just before Meach could reveal the heroes' secret identities, the powers he gained from the statues faded away.

A few years later, an alien villain named Xan came to Earth to avenge his dead father, a criminal who had been imprisoned by Superman and Batman. Xan restored Joseph Meach's powers by recreating the original accident. Meach by this time no longer resented Superman and Batman, but the accident restored his memory and malevolence along with his powers. To symbolize his renewed purpose to kill the heroes, he used the powers of Sun Boy and Lightning Lad to destroy statues of Superman and Batman, leading to investigation by the duo. This time, the duo were able to deduce their enemy's identity, as they checked the museum employees who were not around when the Composite Superman was sighted. Superman then destroyed the Legion statuettes to prevent their foe from charging up again. The Composite Superman captured Superman and Batman by impersonating a chained Robin, then tried to kill the team by using his powers to simultaneously turn half of their bodies to anti-matter; Meach's powers (and resentment) wore off before he could accomplish this, but Xan appeared to finish the job, firing a lethal energy blast at the heroes with his Magna-Gun. The remorseful Meach intercepted the blast, dying instantly. A statue was made to honor Joseph Meach, saying that he "lived a villain, but died a hero".

=== Xan ===
Xan escaped from prison and traveled back in time to recreate the event that endowed Joseph Meach with his powers, but with himself obtaining the powers. Xan assumed the identity of the Composite Superman and displayed greater control over his powers and understanding over his weaknesses, such as timing his needed restorations of energy to maintain his power. Xan discarded the Composite Superman identity and created an original costume with the new name Amalgamax. Superman traveled to the 30th century to ask the Legion of Super-Heroes for assistance. Superman, Batman, and the Legion defeated Amalgamax by making him believe that the disease that killed his father had developed in him and that his excessive power was causing the disease to develop rapidly.

=== Composite ===
The Composite Superman's origin was reimagined as an early attempt of Professor Ivo to duplicate the Justice League's powers by creating clones of the Justice League. It was only ever referred to as "Composite". Believing it to be a failure, Professor Ivo buried his creature in a field. The clones later revived themselves, merged into one being, and stole Superman and Batman outfits from a store, sewing half of each together. Acting as both Superman/Batman and their alter egos of Clark Kent/Bruce Wayne, the Composite creature kidnapped Lois Lane and Tim Drake in an attempt to live the lives of both of its counterparts. He was later attacking Metallo when Batman and Superman arrived, but the duo could not defeat him and he escaped. They tracked him down and told him if he wanted to be both of them, then go ahead. They told him of many crimes taking place and he could not decide whom to help first. Composite became unstable and ripped himself apart before they could help him.

=== Composite Man ===
Following the Zero Hour reboot of Legion history, the Composite Superman was removed from continuity. Legion of Super-Heroes (vol. 4) #68 introduced a new villain called the "Composite Man", a Durlan with the ability to duplicate any Legionnaire's powers and appearance. Rather than the clean, split-down-the-middle appearance of the Composite Superman, the Composite Man had a shifting mixture of costume elements from all the Legion members. Both he and his sister had been given these abilities by the Durlan government to be weapons and resented this. However, while she chose to make her own destiny, the Composite Man joined the Dark Circle to gain revenge on the Durlans. Composite Man later confronts Saturn Girl, who uses her telepathy to shut down his mind and render him catatonic.

== Superpowers ==
=== Joseph Meach ===
The Joseph Meach incarnation of Composite Superman possesses all of Superman's powers, as well as those of Supergirl, Mon-El, Ultra Boy, and the members of the Legion of Super-Heroes.

- Growth (Colossal Boy)
- Shrinking (Shrinking Violet)
- Triplicate cloning (Triplicate Girl)
- Electrokinesis (Lightning Lad)
- Fire generation (Sun Boy)
- The ability to make things weigh less (Light Lass)
- The ability to make things weigh more (Star Boy)
- Matter consumption (Matter-Eater Lad)
- Invisibility (Invisible Kid)
- Inflation (Bouncing Boy)
- Elasticity (Elastic Lad)
- Shapeshifting (Chameleon Boy)
- Telepathy (Saturn Girl)
- 12th-level intelligence (Brainiac 5)
- Magnetic manipulation (Cosmic Boy)
- X-ray vision (Ultra Boy)
- Elemental transmutation (Element Lad)
- Intangibility (Phantom Girl)

=== Composite ===
Professor Ivo's version of the character possesses the powers of Superman, Batman, Atom, Elongated Man, and Red Tornado.

== Other versions ==
- In Impulse #56, Crayd'l, a nanotech computer belonging to Inertia, accesses Young Justice's files and uses information on Robin and Superboy to become a "Composite Superboy", with the half-and-half, green-skinned appearance of the original.
- A DC Animated Universe-inspired incarnation of Composite Superman appears in Superman and Batman: World's Funnest.
- In Superman/Batman #25, a new Composite Superman/Batman is created when Mister Mxyzptlk fuses the Supermen and Batmen of several alternate realities together. This ends at the battle's conclusion and all the Batmen and Supermen are sent away, leaving only the main universe Superman and Batman.
- A mecha based on Composite Superman appears in Superman/Batman #6.
- The Joseph Meach incarnation of Composite Superman makes a cameo appearance in The Kingdom: Planet Krypton #1.

== In other media ==
=== Television ===
- The Composite Superman makes a cameo appearance in the Justice League Unlimited episode "The Greatest Story Never Told", voiced by Susan Eisenberg. This version is an amalgamation of Batman, Superman, and Wonder Woman created by Mordru.
- The Composite Santa Claus, a character based on Composite Superman, appears in Robot Chicken, voiced by Christian Slater.
- The Composite Superman appears in Robot Chicken DC Comics Special III: Magical Friendship, voiced by Jonathan Banks.

=== Film ===
A mecha based on Composite Superman appears in Superman/Batman: Public Enemies.

=== Video games ===
- The Joseph Meach incarnation of the Composite Superman appears as a character summon in Scribblenauts Unmasked: A DC Comics Adventure.
- The Joseph Meach incarnation of the Composite Superman appears as a playable character in Lego Batman 3: Beyond Gotham, voiced by Travis Willingham.

=== Merchandise ===
- An action figure of Composite Superman was produced by DC Direct and released in 2005. A second version, based on the character's appearance in Superman/Batman: Vengeance issue #5, was released in 2008.
- Beast Kingdom displayed a planned Composite Superman action figure during the 2024 Shanghai Toy Licensing Expo.

== See also ==
- List of Superman enemies
- List of Batman family enemies
