= End of an Era (comics) =

American comic book story arc

- Publisher: DC Comics
- Publication date: August – September 1994
- Genre: Science fiction, superhero
- Title(s): Legion of Super-Heroes vol. 4, #59-61; Legionnaires #16-18; Valor #21-23
- Main character(s): Legion of Super-Heroes; Mordru; Glorith; Time Trapper

Creative team
- Writer(s): Mark Waid; Tom McCraw; Kurt Busiek
- Penciller(s): Stuart Immonen; Ron Boyd; Chris Gardner; Colleen Doran
- Editor: KC Carlson

"End of an Era" is an American comic book story arc that was published by DC Comics, and presented in Legion of Super-Heroes vol. 4, #60-61, Legionnaires #17-18, and Valor #22-23 (August–September 1994). It was written by Mark Waid, Tom McCraw and Kurt Busiek, with pencils by Stuart Immonen, Ron Boyd, Chris Gardner and Colleen Doran. A tie-in to the Zero Hour: Crisis in Time! miniseries, it is the final story in the Legion of Super-Heroes' original continuity, which dated back to 1958.

== Plot ==
=== Part 1: Legionnaires #17 ===
The members of Batch SW6 - clones of the members of the Legion of Super-Heroes - prevent a mysterious being from destroying the domed cities that make up New Earth. They are shocked to learn that the man is a disoriented Rokk Krinn, Cosmic Boy from the adult version of the Legion of Super-Heroes. The SW6 Invisible Kid and the two versions of Brainiac 5 inform the Legion that the timestream has become fractured and that an unknown force has been shifting reality for years. While being attacked by various villains from different alternate timelines, members from the dual Legions are confronted by Mordru and Glorith.

=== Part 2: Valor #22 ===
The structural core connecting the domed cities of New Earth is on the verge of collapse, and a second faction from the two Legions tries to hold the planet together. Valor struggles to remember the major details of his life, as portions of his memory keep shifting. R. J. Brande devises a plan to bring the Earth from the pocket universe into the regular universe, and settle the domes of New Earth there. Computo (Danielle Foccart) and Troy Stewart (the former Tyroc) open a gigantic wormhole, allowing Valor, the SW6 Andromeda and Dev-Em to tow Earth from the pocket universe to the regular one. However, a matter-energy shift occurs, destabilizing Earth's core. Before the group can take additional action, more Legionnaires fade from existence.

=== Part 3: Legion of Super-Heroes vol. 4, #60 ===
Mordru and Glorith imprison Cosmic Boy in a castle on the planet Baaldur. They do not kill him, as Glorith has determined that he is a "child of destiny" and that killing him would unleash chaos throughout the timestream. Meanwhile, almost all the living past and present members of both Legions gather on Winath to find Cosmic Boy. Even as more Legionnaires vanish, Rond Vidar, the SW6 Invisible Kid and the two Brainiac 5s determine that the timestream is completely unraveling, and must be repaired within hours. Mordru and Glorith travel to Legion headquarters on the planet Talus, and reach the team's Time Beacon. They use it to summon the Infinite Man, the embodiment of the space-time continuum. Mordru and Glorith immediately attack, allowing them to absorb Infinite Man's energy and kill him. and dissolve him into nothingness. Cosmic Boy escapes to the Infinite Library, an archive of all chronal knowledge.

=== Part 4: Legionnaires #18 ===
Now possessing near-godlike power, Mordru and Glorith begin to remold reality, with themselves as rulers. Mysa Nal, Projectra, Dragonmage, and the two Dream Girls) channel their energy into Devlin O'Ryan, intending for him to stop Mordru and Glorith. Just as they are ready to act, Devlin fades away, leaving the mystics with no focus for their magic. With more of the Legion vanishing each minute, the heroes fend off attacks by a group of evil doppelganger Legionnaires. Before Mysa disappears, she summons Amethyst's power to reverse Mordru and Glorith's changes to the timeline.

In the 20th century, the founding SW6 Legionnaires (Cosmic Boy, Saturn Girl, and Live Wire) emerge from a shattered Time Bubble high above Earth. They are about to fall to their deaths when they are saved by Ultra Boy. An image of Superman then appears before them, seeking their aid to avert a great disaster. In the Infinite Library, where time does not pass, Cosmic Boy spends an untold length of time studying the volumes on the shelves, learning as much as possible about the secrets of time. Eventually, he notices a door that is slightly ajar. He walks through the door and encounters the Time Trapper.

=== Part 5: Valor #23 ===
The Time Trapper tells Cosmic Boy that — despite his many battles with the Legion — he has actually been attempting to save the 30th century all along from an impending cataclysm in time. As part of the plan, he used his power to split the Legion into two separate timelines before Ferro Lad's death, placing one group in time-stasis to become the SW6 Legionnaires. Eventually, the Trapper's attempts to protect time drove him mad, and created revisions to the timeline that allowed Mordru and Glorith to become galactic threats.

The Legionnaires gain much-needed assistance when Superboy appears and knocks Glorith out. The team then bathes Mordru in all of the floating chronal energy, overloading him and permitting Saturn Girl to command him to teleport to the core of the planet — where his claustrophobia will render him powerless. Valor then fades away, and — after an inspirational speech — so does Superboy.

=== Part 6: Legion of Super-Heroes vol. 4, #61 ===
The remaining Legionnaires gather on Pocket Earth, where Ultra Boy and the SW6 founders return from the 20th century. Cosmic Boy is then returned to the group by the Time Trapper, who reveals himself to be Cosmic Boy's future self. It is revealed that Cosmic Boy was destined to become the Time Trapper and attempt in vain to prevent the catastrophe in time, and the creation of the second Legion team has further weakened the timestream. The timestream can only be saved if the adult Legion merges with their SW6 counterparts. Most of the remaining Legionnaires reunite and fade into the timestream, leaving only the dual versions of the founders. Before departing, the Trapper assures them that their sacrifice will not be in vain. Pocket Earth begins to break apart, and the Legionnaires join hands as their universe is destroyed.

== Aftermath ==
"End of an Era" is a tie-in to the Zero Hour: Crisis in Time! miniseries, which attempted to resolve the DC Universe's convoluted timeline. Thereafter, Legion continuity is rebooted, starting in Legion of Super-Heroes vol. 4, #0 (October 1994). A second reboot occurred in the final pages of Teen Titans/Legion Special (November 2004).

Following Infinite Crisis, much of the original Legion continuity is restored, but "End of an Era" is not, and the story arc is no longer considered canonical.

In current continuity, the Time Trapper is not Rokk Krinn, and his identity is constantly shifting. He remains one of the Legion's principal enemies, with the complete removal of Superman from the timestream as one of his chief goals.
