= Starfinger =

- The Lars Hanscom incarnation of Starfinger as depicted in Who's Who in the Legion of Super-Heroes #6 (October 1988). Art by Howard Bender (penciller), Arne Starr (inker), and Carl Gafford (colorist).

Publication information
- Publisher: DC Comics
- First appearance: Adventure Comics #335 (August 1965)
- Created by: Edmond Hamilton (script); John Forte (art)

In-story information
- Alter ego: Garth Ranzz; Dr. Lars Hanscom; Char Burrane; Molock Hanscom; Jan Arrah
- Abilities: Ability to project power rays from the fingers of his hand.

Starfinger is the name of several supervillains appearing in media published by DC Comics, primarily as an enemy of the Legion of Super-Heroes. The character first appeared in Adventure Comics #335 (August 1965), and was created by Edmond Hamilton and John Forte.

== Fictional character biography ==
=== Lars Hanscom ===
Starfinger is introduced as a helmeted figure with five different powers generated by each finger of his right hand. He is later revealed to be Garth Ranzz, who was hypnotized by Lars Hanscom. Hanscom had been seeking to obtain the metal rejuvium and regain his youth, having developed a fear of aging. Posing as Garth's physician, Hanscom hypnotized him under the pretense of developing an organic prosthetic limb for him. Hanscom is brought to justice, but later escapes prison and attempts a solo criminal career, assuming the Starfinger identity himself.

=== Char Burrane ===
Char Burrane is a fugitive who Gim Allon pursued shortly before the meteor strike that gave him superpowers. While on Mars, Burrane discovers a mysterious ring containing a microscopic world, which he uses to establish a criminal empire. Years later, Burrane claims the name of Starfinger and has Lars Hanscom killed. Displaying a vendetta against Allon, Starfinger captures him and Chameleon Boy. However, he is overwhelmed by the other Legionnaires and flees to the world within his ring.

=== Molock Hanscom ===
Molock Hanscom, the former leader of the Cosmic Spy League and brother of Lars Hanscom, becomes Starfinger after arranging for Char Burrane to be killed. Hanscom is later killed by Firefist, one of several Khunds who allied with the Legion of Super-Heroes to battle Mordru.

=== Jan Arrah ===
Jan Arrah, a member of the Legion of Super-Heroes known as Element Lad, briefly assumed the Starfinger identity while under the control of Jeanne Chu, president of the United Planets.

== Powers and abilities ==
Starfinger's right hand has star-tipped fingers, each of which can generate a different type of energy ray. He can generate lightning, ice, and various forms of radiation, and disrupt superpowers.

== In other media ==
- An unidentified Starfinger, with his design inspired by the Char Burrane version, appears in the Legion of Super-Heroes episode "The Substitutes", voiced by Taylor Negron. This version's powers are derived from mechanical gloves that can create rope; fire lasers and concussive sound waves; produce fire, water, and ice; and provide rocket propulsion. Furthermore, he can summon "Furries", small flying creatures from another dimension that grow into ionosphere-eating monsters.
  - Starfinger appears in the tie-in comic Legion of Super-Heroes in the 31st Century, where he is revealed to possess self-duplication abilities.
