= The Death of Ferro Lad =

Comic story arc featuring the Legion of Super-Heroes

- Ferro Lad delivers the Absorbatron bomb into the center of the Sun-Eater in Adventure Comics #353 (February 1967); art by Curt Swan and George Klein.
- Publisher: DC Comics
- Publication date: January – February 1967
- Genre: Science fiction, superhero
- Title(s): Adventure Comics #352–353
- Main character(s): Legion of Super-Heroes; Fatal Five

Creative team
- Writer: Jim Shooter
- Artist(s): Curt Swan; George Klein
- Editor: Mort Weisinger
- The Life and Death of Ferro Lad: ISBN 1-4012-2193-9

"The Death of Ferro Lad" is an American comic book story arc that was published as "The Fatal Five" by DC Comics, and was presented in Adventure Comics #352–353 (January–February 1967). It was written by Jim Shooter, with art by Curt Swan and George Klein. The story arc includes the first appearance of the villainous Fatal Five. It is also notable for featuring the first "permanent" death of a member of the Legion of Super-Heroes. (Note: Lightning Lad was killed battling Zaryan the Conqueror in Adventure Comics #304 (January 1963), but was revived in issue #312 (September 1963).)

This particular story line has been lauded as being among the best young adult literature of 1967, ranking among (un-illustrated) novels like Taran Wanderer and The Outsiders.

== Plot ==
At their headquarters in the 30th century, five members of the Legion of Super-Heroes watch a Science Police documentary on its most wanted villains, who have been dubbed the "Fatal Five": the Persuader, a paid assassin and enforcer whose Atomic Axe can slice any type of matter or energy; Tharok, a cyborg criminal mastermind; the Emerald Empress, who seized control of the planet Vengar after stealing the mystical Emerald Eye of Ekron; (Note: Her home planet is spelled Venegar in subsequent stories.) Validus, a gigantic creature who can project lightning from his brain; and Mano, a mutant with the ability to project antimatter from his right hand. Hours later, the Legionnaires receive word that a Sun-Eater is approaching Earth. As Superboy explains to newer members Princess Projectra and Ferro Lad, (Note: Princess Projectra and Ferro Lad joined the Legion in Adventure Comics #346 (July 1966).) the Sun-Eater can completely devour energy from stars and threatens to destroy Earth's sun.

Short-handed and unable to recruit assistance from other heroes in the galaxy, the five Legionnaires decide to seek aid from the Fatal Five, who would also die if the Sun-Eater cannot be stopped. Cosmic Boy locates Tharok, who joins him after being promised a full pardon. Superboy rescues the Emerald Empress as she is about to be executed on the planet Craggok; she accompanies him, bringing a small chunk of green kryptonite with her. Sun Boy travels to Bismari and obtains Validus's release the day before his scheduled execution. On Jupiter's twelfth moon, Princess Projectra successfully recruits Persuader. Ferro Lad rescues Mano just as the villain's right hand is about to be amputated in space, which would have killed him.

Mano launches a failed attempt to form an alliance with the Emerald Empress. She unsuccessfully tries to convince Superboy to help her conquer her home planet, even after using kryptonite as a means of persuasion. Soon after, Tharok reveals his plan to destroy the Sun-Eater: Tharok will temporarily increase the powers of all the heroes and villains. Sun Boy will use his solar powers in open space to lure the cloud away from Sol. Persuader will use his Atomic Axe to divide the Sun-Eater into eight smaller sections, and the others will destroy the individual pieces. Later, the five villains meet in secret and band together as a formal group, bent on conquering the galaxy.

When the plan is implemented, seven of the heroes and villains manage to weaken the Sun-Eater, but fail to completely destroy it. Even Superboy fails when the Sun-Eater blasts him with red solar radiation. Ferro Lad tries to reach and destroy the cloud's core, but is rebuffed by an energy blast. The Sun-Eater reforms, prompting Tharok to construct an Absorbatron bomb, which can destroy the Sun-Eater if detonated at its core. Since Tharok had no time to build a propulsion device, one of them must carry the bomb to the core and detonate it manually, sacrificing themselves in the process. Superboy is about to take the bomb, citing he has the best chance to survive, but he is still weak from the red sun rays. Ferro Lad opts to do so instead, destroying the Sun-Eater and himself.

The Legionnaires offer full pardons to the members of the Fatal Five, but they attack and quickly overcome the heroes. Tharok commands Validus to destroy them, but he refuses and turns on the villains. When Validus' mental lightning strikes Persuader's Atomic Axe, the Fatal Five disappears. Later, the other Legionnaires return from their distant mission. Unable to recover Ferro Lad's remains, the team sends a missile in memoriam to him to the cemetery planet Shanghalla. The Legionnaires promise to never forget his sacrifice.

== Final Night ==
Ferro Lad is reintroduced in post-Zero Hour continuity under the name Ferro. Originating from the 20th century, he works with the Legion of Super-Heroes, who were stranded in the past, to combat the Sun-Eater. Ferro attempts a suicide mission to destroy the Sun-Eater, but is saved by Parallax.

== Post-Infinite Crisis ==
In the aftermath of the Infinite Crisis miniseries, most of the Legion's original continuity has been restored. The story of the Sun-Eater and the death of Ferro Lad is once again part of Legion history.

== Collected editions ==
In 2009, The Life and Death of Ferro Lad (ISBN 1-4012-2193-9), a hardcover collection of the Silver Age appearances of Ferro Lad, was released. The story of the Sun-Eater and Ferro Lad's death from Adventure Comics #352-353 is included. The tale is also reprinted in Legion of Super-Heroes Archives, Volume 6 (ISBN 1-56389-277-4), which was published in 1997 as part of the DC Archive Editions collection.

== In other media ==
=== Television ===
In 2007, the story arc was adapted as "Sundown", the two-part season one finale of the animated series Legion of Super Heroes.
