= Terra-Man =

- The pre-Crisis incarnation of Terra-Man as depicted in Superman #249 (March 1972). Art by Neal Adams.

Publication information
- Publisher: DC Comics
- First appearance: Superman #249 (March 1972)
- Created by: Cary Bates; Curt Swan; Dick Dillin

In-story information
- Alter ego: Tobias "Toby" Manning
- Species: Human
- Place of origin: Earth
- Abilities: Expert marksmanship Slow aging

Terra-Man (Tobias Manning) is a supervillain appearing in media published by DC Comics, primarily as an enemy of Superman. In his original depiction, Terra-Man is a cowboy who was orphaned by an alien called the Currency-Criminal and subsequently raised by him. In post-Crisis continuity, Terra-Man is a businessman who opposes environmentally unsafe business practices and is assisted by an army of robots called the Terra-Men.

== Publication history ==
Terra-Man first appeared in Superman #249 (March 1972) and was created by Cary Bates, Curt Swan, and Dick Dillin. According to Bates, the character was inspired by Clint Eastwood's Man with No Name, who appeared in three Spaghetti Western films from 1964 to 1966.

== Fictional character biography ==
=== Pre-Crisis ===
Tobias Manning was born during the Old West era. An alien known as the Currency-Criminal accidentally killed Tobias's father Jess and took young Tobias as his ward, raising him from childhood. Tobias spent years in space with the Currency-Criminal before returning to Earth, which slowed his aging process. As an adult, Tobias kills the Currency-Criminal and becomes an interstellar outlaw called "Terra-Man", a name chosen to refer to his Earthly origins. For transportation, he tames Nova, an Arguvian alien resembling a winged horse. After learning how much Earth has changed since his departure, Terra-Man battles Superman, but is defeated and jailed.

=== Post-Crisis ===
The post-Crisis version of Terra-Man is a businessman who begins attacking enterprises that endanger the environment after realizing that his own practices are not environmentally healthy.

Manning develops a variety of weapons themed around nature, including guns that can cause shockwaves and earthquakes. He engineers numerous forms of plant life to meet his needs, including plants that can drain solar energy and liquefy organic material. Manning also develops a process to quickly and cleanly remove poison from toxic sites and renew nutrients in soil. He is served by a robotic army dressed in western garb, called the Terra-Men.

In 52, Terra-Man hijacks Ferris Air Flight 456 over the Mediterranean Sea and escapes due to Black Adam forbidding Power Girl from entering Kahndaq airspace. Adam later kills Terra-Man in front of the press at the Kahndaq embassy by ripping him in half.

=== Dawn of DC ===
The original version of Terra-Man is reintroduced in Superman (vol. 6) as part of the "Dawn of DC" initiative. After Superman and Marilyn Moonlight are displaced in time, they encounter Terra-Man, who has been hiding in the 19th century using his time travel technology. Superman challenges Terra-Man to a western-style duel, which Terra-Man manages to win. Before Terra-Man can flee, he is stopped by Moonlight, who has stolen his technology. Superman leaves Terra-Man imprisoned and stranded in the past, reasoning that another time traveler will retrieve him.

== Powers and abilities ==
The pre-Crisis version of Terra-Man has an altered physiology that slows his aging and allows him to survive unprotected in space. He is also an expert equestrian.

The post-Crisis version of Terra-Man is a skilled botanist.

=== Equipment ===
He wields a revolver that can fire tracer bullets, energy-leeching tumbleweeds, and laser lassos. Terra-Man uses an Arguvian steed named Nova for transportation.

The post-Crisis version of Terra-Man uses weapons that manipulate the environment (i.e., plants and the earth).

== In other media ==
=== Television ===
- Tobias Manning appears in the Justice League Unlimited episode "The Once and Future Thing, Part One: Weird Western Tales", voiced by Ed O'Ross. This version is an outlaw from the 1880s.
- Terra-Man appears in the Legion of Super Heroes episode "Unnatural Alliances", voiced by Jeff Black. This version is a self-repairing android from the 41st century who the artificial intelligence K3NT created and sent back in time to the 31st century to kill a boy named Abel before he can create the technology utilized by Imperiex. In response, Imperiex works with K3NT's other creation, Kell-El / Superman X, to protect Abel, destroy Terra-Man, and preserve the timeline.

=== Video games ===
Terra-Man appears as a character summon in Scribblenauts Unmasked: A DC Comics Adventure.
