= End of an Era =

End of an Era may refer to:

== Music ==
=== Albums ===
- End of an Era (album), a 2006 album by Nightwish
- The End of an Era (album), a 2021 album by Iggy Azalea

=== Songs ===
- "End of an Era", a song from 2011 album Never Back Down by Close to Home
- "End of an Era", a song from 2005 album Turn Against This Land by Dogs
- "End of an Era", a song from 2002 album Between Heaven and Hell by Firewind
- "End of an Era", a song from 2005 album The Way by Zack Hemsey
- "End of an Era", a song from 2024 album Radical Optimism by Dua Lipa
- "End of an Era", a song from 2015 album Astoria by Marianas Trench
- "End of an Era", a song from 1991 album The Index Masters by Wall of Voodoo
- "The End of an Era", a song from 2011 album Temple of Rock by Michael Schenker Group
- "The End of an Era", a song from 2002 EP No Wings to Speak Of by Hopesfall

== Other uses ==
- The End of an Era (series), a 2025 behind the scenes documentary series about Taylor Swift's The Eras Tour
- "End of an Era" (comics), an 1994 American comic book story arc
- End of an Era (film), a 1994 Greek film
- "End of an Era", poem by Adrienne Rich 1961
- End of an Era, science fiction novel by Robert J. Sawyer 1994
- The Undertaker versus Triple H, billed as the "end of an era" at WrestleMania XXVIII
