= Element Lad =

DC Comics character

- Element Lad as depicted in Adventure Comics #323 (August 1964). Art by John Forte (penciller) and George Klein (inker).

Publication information
- Publisher: DC Comics
- First appearance: Adventure Comics #307 (April 1963)
- Created by: Edmond Hamilton; John Forte

In-story information
- Alter ego: Jan Arrah
- Species: Trommite
- Place of origin: Trom
- Team affiliations: Legion of Super-Heroes
- Notable aliases: Mystery Lad; Alchemist; Progenitor
- Abilities: Element transmutation Equipment: Legion flight ring

Element Lad (Jan Arrah) is a superhero appearing in media published by DC Comics, primarily as a member of the Legion of Super-Heroes in the 30th and 31st centuries. A native of the planet Trom, he has the power to transmute chemical elements.

== Publication history ==
Element Lad first appeared in Adventure Comics #307, and was created by Edmond Hamilton and John Forte.

== Fictional character biography ==
=== Pre-Zero Hour ===
Element Lad, whose real name is Jan Arrah, first appears in Adventure Comics #307 (1963). In this first story, he is briefly known as "Mystery Lad" as the Legionnaires do not initially know his powers. Jan is the last survivor of Trom, as he was in space at the time when the space pirate Roxxas massacred the Trommites for refusing to transmute valuable elements for him.

With the aid of the Legion, Roxxas is brought to justice and Jan joins the Legion, using the codename Element Lad. He is a member of the Legion for many years, serving terms as leader and deputy leader. He later enters a relationship with Shvaughn Erin, the Science Police's Legion liaison.

==== "Five Years Later" ====
In November 1989, the Legion continuity jumps ahead five years. During this time, Earth fell under the control of the Dominators and withdrew from the United Planets. It is revealed that Shvaughn Erin had been born as a male named Sean and used the drug ProFem to change her sex and complete her gender transition. With ProFem no longer available, Shvaughn reverts to her original gender. Jan is unfazed and continues their relationship.

At the same time, the members of the Dominators' classified "Batch SW6" escape captivity. Batch SW6 are originally believed to be clones of the Legionnaires created from samples taken prior to Ferro Lad's death, but are later revealed to be temporal duplicates. After Earth is destroyed, a few dozen surviving cities and their inhabitants reconstitute their world as New Earth. The SW6 Legionnaires remain, and their version of Element Lad assumes the code name Alchemist.

=== Post-Zero Hour ===
Element Lad is reintroduced following Zero Hour: Crisis in Time!, which rebooted the Legion's continuity. In post-Zero Hour continuity, the Trommites were massacred by the White Triangle, a group of Daxamite terrorists.

In Legion Lost (2000), Element Lad is lost in deep space for billions of years, driving him to insanity and causing him to become the villain Progenitor. Garth Ranzz sacrifices himself to defeat Progenitor, whose body leaves behind several crystals. Kid Quantum leaves the crystals at Garth's grave on the planet Shanghalla. The crystals later reform into Progenitor's body, which houses Garth's consciousness. In this form, Garth is able to use both Element Lad's transmutation abilities and his own electric abilities.

In Final Crisis: Legion of 3 Worlds (2008), the post-Zero Hour Legion is brought to the pre-Crisis Legion's timeline to help battle Superboy-Prime and the Legion of Super-Villains. The pre-Crisis Brainiac 5 uses a special lightning rod to enhance the transmutation ability of Element Lad's body, allowing him to transform himself to resemble his original body.

=== "Threeboot" ===
In the "Threeboot" continuity, Element Lad is the lone survivor of a lost planet. This version's powers are triggered by touch and only last several minutes. The "Threeboot" Element Lad also appears in Final Crisis: Legion of 3 Worlds, where he is killed by Superboy-Prime.

=== Post-Infinite Crisis ===
The events of the Infinite Crisis miniseries restore a close analogue of the pre-Crisis Legion to continuity.

In Last Stand of New Krypton, Element Lad is part of a secret team sent by R. J. Brande to the 21st century to save the future, posing as a chemistry teacher in Smallville. He recruits Conner Kent, a student in his class, to help him by heading to New Krypton.

In Doomsday Clock, Element Lad is among the Legion of Super-Heroes members who appear in the present after Doctor Manhattan undoes his alterations to the timeline, resurrecting the Legion and the Justice Society of America.

== Powers and abilities ==
Element Lad is able to transmute objects by touch and change one chemical element into any other, for instance, lead to gold or iron to aluminium. He can transmute an element even if it is part of a compound and can change solid objects into gaseous ones. Element Lad can also sense the elemental composition of any substance. He possesses extensive knowledge of chemistry and how to use his abilities effectively.

As a member of the Legion of Super-Heroes, Element Lad is provided a Legion Flight Ring, which allows him to fly and protects him from the vacuum of space and other dangerous environments.

== In other media ==
- Element Lad makes non-speaking cameo appearances in Legion of Super Heroes.
- Element Lad appears as a character summon in Scribblenauts Unmasked: A DC Comics Adventure.
- Element Lad appears in Adventures in the DC Universe #10.
- Element Lad appears in the one-shot comic Batman '66 Meets the Legion of Super-Heroes.
