= Alexander Polinsky =

American actor

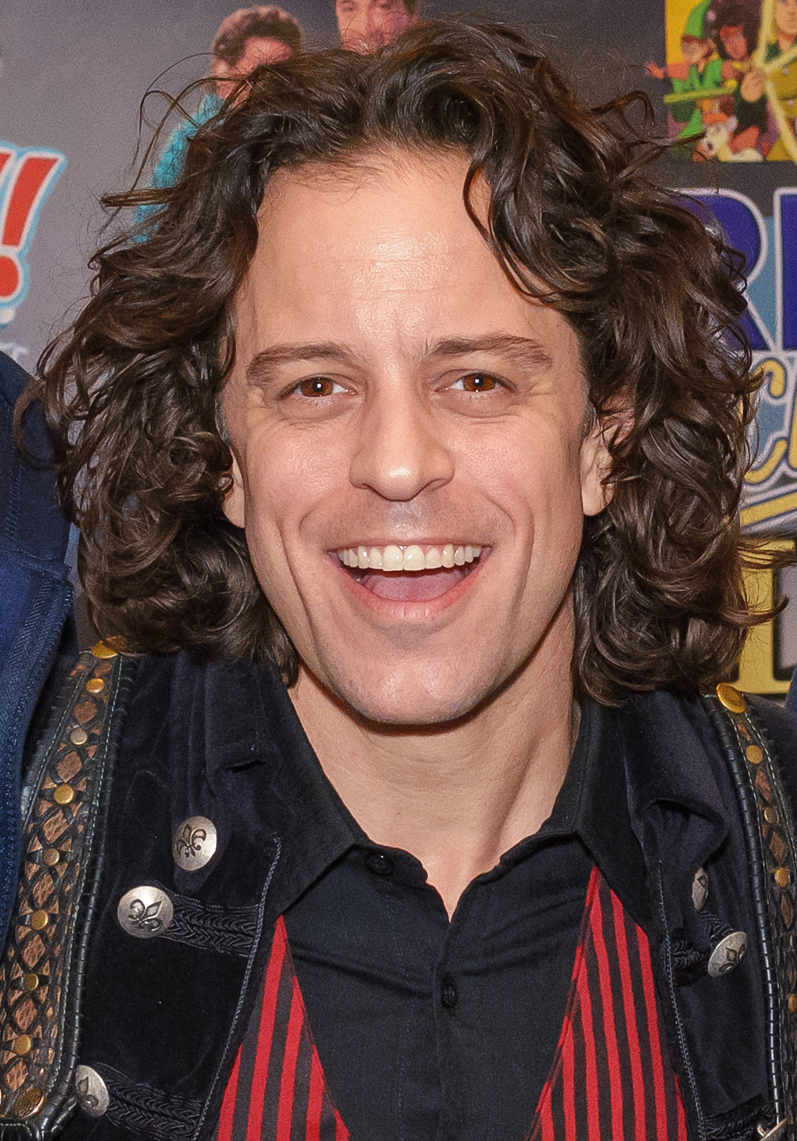
- Polinsky at the 2017 Chiller Theatre Expo
- Born: October 7, 1974 (age 51)
- Occupation: Actor
- Years active: 1987–present

Alexander Niver Polinsky(born October 7, 1974) is an American actor. He is known for his role as Adam Powell on Charles in Charge. In animation, he has voiced Control Freak on Teen Titans (2003) and Teen Titans Go! (2013), Argit in the Ben 10 franchise, Dennis Lee in The Life and Times of Juniper Lee, and Darington in Blaze and the Monster Machines.

== Personal life ==
In 2018, Polinsky accused former costar Scott Baio of physically assaulting and verbally abusing him on the set of Charles in Charge.

== Filmography ==
=== Animation ===
List of voice performances in animation
Year	Title	Role	Notes	Source
1999–2000	Roughnecks: Starship Troopers Chronicles	Private Robert "Bobby" Higgins		
2000	Recess	Kid #1	Episode: "The Fuss Over Finster"	
2002	The Zeta Project	Teenage Boy	Episode: "Resume Mission"	
2003	Spider-Man: The New Animated Series	Teen #1	Episode: "When Sparks Fly"	
2004–2005	Teen Titans	Control Freak	3 episodes	
2005–2006	The Life and Times of Juniper Lee	Dennis Lee, additional voices	31 episodes	
2005–2007	A.T.O.M.	Garrett		
2006	W.I.T.C.H.	Vance Michael Justin	Episode: "O Is for Obedience"	
2007	Random! Cartoons	Harold, Elf	Episode: "Kyle + Rosemary"	
2007–2008	Legion of Super Heroes	Chameleon Boy, Matter-Eater Lad, Calamity King	10 episodes	
2008–2009	Transformers: Animated	Henry Masterson / Headmaster	3 episodes	
2008–2010	Ben 10: Alien Force	Argit	3 episodes	
2009–2011	Batman: The Brave and the Bold	Slug, G'nort, Jimmy Olsen	3 episodes	
2010–2011	Ben 10: Ultimate Alien	Argit	4 episodes	
2012–2014	Ben 10: Omniverse	Argit, Jarett, Grack, Techadon Soldier	10 episodes	
2014–2016	Breadwinners	Jelly, Lanky, Stumpy		
2014	The Boondocks	Additional voices	2 episodes	
2014–2015	Turbo Fast	Eduard, Merv, Girlfriend, Flying Squirrel	3 episodes	
2014–present	Teen Titans Go!	Control Freak	Recurring role	
2014-2025	Blaze and the Monster Machines	Darington	Main role	
2016–2018	Lost in Oz	Fitz, additional voices	10 episodes	
2017	Michael Jackson's Halloween	Additional voices	Television film	
2019	DC Super Hero Girls	Penguin		
2022–2024	Monster High	Heath Burns	Main role	

=== Film ===
List of voice performances in films
Year	Title	Role	Notes	Source
1994	Pumpkinhead II: Blood Wings	Paul		
2005	Saints and Soldiers	Steven Gould	Credited as Alexander Niver	
2013	Khumba	Nigel	English dub	
2015	Minions	Additional voices		
2015	Curious George 3: Back to the Jungle	Tech Andrew	Direct-to-video	
2015	Krampus	Dark Elves	Uncredited	
2017	Resident Evil: Vendetta	Patricio	English dub	
2018	Teen Titans Go! To the Movies	Control Freak		
2022	Teen Titans Go! & DC Super Hero Girls: Mayhem in the Multiverse	Control Freak	Direct-to-video	

=== Video games ===
List of voice performances in video games
Year	Title	Role	Notes	Source
2004	Law & Order: Justice Is Served	Jesus Gonzalez, Jimmy Russo, Rodrigo Silva		
2005	Teen Titans	Control Freak		
2006	24: The Game	Robert Daniels		
2006	Pimp My Ride	Additional voices		
2009	Eat Lead: The Return of Matt Hazard	Dexter Dare, Commando, Zombie		
2011	X-Men: Destiny	Toad		
2012	Guild Wars 2	Egor, Gixx, Ropp'tchtach		
2015	King's Quest	Alexander, Gwydion		
