= Robot Chicken DC Comics Special III: Magical Friendship =

Episode of Robot Chicken

- Written by: Hugh Davidson; Mike Fasolo; Seth Green; Geoff Johns; J.T. Krul; Breckin Meyer; Matthew Senreich; Tom Sheppard; Kevin Shinick
- Directed by: Tom Sheppard; Zeb Wells
- Voices of: See § Voice cast
- Narrated by: Kevin Shinick

Production
- Production companies: DC Entertainment; Stoopid Monkey; Stoopid Buddy Stoodios; Sony Pictures Television; Warner Bros. Animation; Williams Street

Original release
- Network: Adult Swim
- Release: October 18, 2015

Related
- Robot Chicken DC Comics Special 2: Villains in Paradise; The Robot Chicken Walking Dead Special: Look Who's Walking

Robot Chicken DC Comics Special III: Magical Friendship is an episode of the animated television series Robot Chicken, aired as a half-hour special during Cartoon Network's Adult Swim on October 18, 2015. (Note: Adult Swim lists the special as premiering on October 18, 2015 at 12:00 a.m. (24:00) EST/PST, which is effectively October 19.) It is the third and final special in the Robot Chicken DC Comics Specials series, following Robot Chicken DC Comics Special and Robot Chicken DC Comics Special 2: Villains in Paradise.

== Synopsis ==
List of sketches

1. Swamp Thing gets a little too excited during sex.
2. The opening is a parody of The Dukes of Hazzard intro with Batman, Superman, and their supporting characters.
3. While carpooling to the Hall of Justice in the Batmobile, Superman rubs it in that he has powers and Batman does not.
4. Brainiac uses his enhanced intelligence for basic trivia with friends.
5. The Justice League welcomes the newest member, Guy with a Rock, to make fun of the powerless Batman and Green Arrow.
6. An unlucky chicken is pitted against Hawkman in a cockfight.
7. Catwoman gets a little too comfortable as she watches the Grumpy Cat Christmas Special.
8. Batman reveals to Robin his contingency plans on how to kill all the members of the Justice League.
9. Kryptonian private investigator Tran-Zar reveals the true story of how Superman came to Earth.
10. Plastic Man, Brainiac, and a couple of robbers debate on what Plastic Man should be called.
11. Batman shows Ra's al Ghul how the Lazarus Pit's restorative properties can be used against him.
12. At the DMV, Cyborg is confused when his name sounds like someone else's.
13. Superman makes Batman believe he does not need powers to bring back his loved ones.
14. Psimon may have vast mental powers, but a major design flaw is shown during a bike ride.
15. After exercising and a shower, Batman is forced to go outside in the streets naked during a fire drill. When he comes back, he finds Superman has replaced him with the janitor.
16. Batman and Superman are forced to do counseling with Doctor Fate.
17. Aquaman tries using his powers to get a candy bar from a vending machine.
18. The Penguin is distracted by Robin's smooth legs during a fight.
19. Fed up with Superman's taunting, Batman uses the Flash's Cosmic Treadmill to introduce the League to a nicer Earth-B Superman. Superman retaliates by using the treadmill to bring over Adam West's Batman. Batman and Superman's abuse of the treadmill leads to summoning an evil Composite Superman who endangers the multiverse while causing multiple versions of DC characters to start showing up everywhere. Batman and Superman must put their differences aside to stop this new threat.
20. Lex Luthor begins a new boy band with his alternate counterparts called "Sexx II Men", the sequel to "Sexx Luthor".
21. In a post-credit scene, Burt Ward uses the Lazarus Pit to relive the glory days with Adam West, only at the cost of Robin's clothes.

== Voice cast ==
- Seth Green as Batman, Robin, Aquaman, Doctor Fate, The Penguin, Scarecrow, Various
- Jonathan Banks as Composite Superman
- Dee Bradley Baker as Ra's al Ghul
- Alex Borstein as Wonder Woman
- Hugh Davidson as Martian Manhunter, Tran-Zar
- Nathan Fillion as Green Lantern
- Shooter Jennings as Mister Banjo
- Breckin Meyer as Superman, Plastic Man
- Alfred Molina as Lex Luthor
- Paul Reubens as The Riddler
- Giovanni Ribisi as The Joker, Two-Face
- Matthew Senreich as The Flash, Brainiac
- Kevin Shinick as narrator
- Burt Ward as himself
- Zeb Wells as Green Arrow, Swamp Thing
- Adam West as 60's Batman, Bank Robber
- Mae Whitman as Power Girl
- "Weird Al" Yankovic as Rubberduck
