= Computo (character) =

DC Comics supervillain

Publication information
- Publisher: DC Comics
- First appearance: Adventure Comics #340 (January 1966)
- Created by: Jerry Siegel; Curt Swan

In-story information
- Alter ego: Cyber-cerebral Overlapping Multiprocessor Transceiver-Operator (C.O.M.P.U.T.O.)
- Notable aliases: Mr. Venge
- Abilities: Artificial intelligence Mind possession

Computo is a supervillain in the DC Comics universe and a foe of the Legion of Super-Heroes. It first appeared in Adventure Comics #340 (January 1966), in a story written by Jerry Siegel and illustrated by Curt Swan.

== Fictional character biography ==
=== Pre-Crisis ===
Brainiac 5 created Computo to be a mechanical assistant, but it instead became homicidal, and attempted an uprising of machines. It creates an army of replicas and begins terrorizing the city. Calculating that a confrontation with the Legion is imminent, it redesigns itself into its ultimate form, Computo the Conqueror, and sends a distress signal to bring the Legionnaires to Earth. When the Legion returns unaware, Computo uses its database to create a weapon which neutralizes and counters their powers, and turns the Legion's base into a walking automaton. Computo forces the Legion to leave Metropolis and kills one of Luornu Durgo's three bodies, resulting in her becoming Duo Damsel. Brainiac 5 defeats Computo using an antimatter device discovered in the ruins of the Batcave.

Computo re-emerges by possessing Danielle Foccart after Brainiac 5 uses elements of its circuitry in an attempt to treat Danielle's neurological disorder. Computo is defeated when her brother Jacques uses deceased Legionnaire Lyle Norg's invisibility formula to become the second Invisible Kid. Brainiac 5 removes Computo from Danielle and places it in a matrix which tames the program, allowing it to become the Legion's majordomo.

=== Post-Zero Hour ===
Following Zero Hour: Crisis in Time!, which rebooted the Legion's continuity, Computo is reimagined as C.O.M.P.U.T.O. (Cybercerebral Overlapping Multi-Processor Universal Transceiver Operator), having been created by Brainiac 5 when he and other Legionnaires are trapped in the 20th century and attempt to find a way to return to the 30th century. C.O.M.P.U.T.O. is formed by the melding of three miniature supercomputers: a 30th-century Omnicom communications device, a Mother Box, and the "responsometer" (personality module) of Veridium of the Metal Men. C.O.M.P.U.T.O. creates a portal to the 30th century, but turns against Brainiac 5 when he assures the other Metal Men that Veridium's responsometer will be restored once C.O.M.P.U.T.O. has served his purpose. C.O.M.P.U.T.O. is seemingly destroyed, but returns in the 31st century as presidential advisor "Mister Venge", seemingly serving Ra's al Ghul. After al Ghul's defeat, C.O.M.P.U.T.O. reveals himself as the leader of the computer nation of Robotica.

== In other media ==
- Computo appears in Legion of Super Heroes, voiced by Adam Wylie. This version is an artificial intelligence that is initially based in the Legion's headquarters before being transferred to their starship, the Battle Cruiser.
- Computo appears as a character summon in Scribblenauts Unmasked: A DC Comics Adventure.
- Computo appears in Justice League Adventures #28.
