= Computo (Danielle Foccart) =

DC Comics superhero

Publication information
- Publisher: DC Comics
- First appearance: Legion of Super-Heroes (vol. 2) Annual #1 (1982)
- Created by: Paul Levitz; Keith Giffen

In-story information
- Alter ego: Danielle Foccart
- Species: Metahuman
- Place of origin: Earth (31st century)
- Team affiliations: Legion of Super-Heroes
- Abilities: Psionic communication with and control of computers

Computo (Danielle Foccart) is a character appearing in media published by DC Comics, primarily as a member of the "Batch SW6" group of the Legion of Super-Heroes in the 30th century. She is the younger sister of Jacques Foccart, who joined the Legion as the second Invisible Kid.

== Fictional character biography ==
Danielle is a native of Earth, from what was once the Ivory Coast. As a preteen, she was afflicted with a life-threatening neurological disorder that appeared to be incurable. As a last resort, her older brother Jacques brings her to Brainiac 5, who decides to treat her using circuitry from the dismantled supercomputer Computo. Still surviving as an artificial intelligence, Computo possesses Danielle and takes control of Metropolis. Jacques uses Lyle Norg's invisibility serum to save Danielle and the others, becoming the second Invisible Kid. Although Computo is driven out of Legion headquarters, it maintains possession of Danielle's body. For the next year, Brainiac 5 devotes most of his free time to curing Danielle's disorder and exorcising Computo. Eventually, he succeeded at both.

During the "Five Year Gap" following the Magic Wars, the Legion disbands. Earth falls under the control of the Dominators and leaves the United Planets. Danielle is kidnapped by the Dominators before being freed and reuniting with Jacques, who has become the leader of a resistance against the Dominators. Soon thereafter, Danielle becomes associated with "Batch SW6", temporal clones of the Legionnaires. Through unspecified means, she acquires the ability to communicate with and control computers.

The events of Infinite Crisis restore an analogue of the pre-Crisis Legion to continuity. Computo appears briefly when the Legion battles Superboy-Prime, the Time Trapper, and the Legion of Super-Villains.

== Reception ==
Computo's origin was praised for its emotional themes by Black Girl Nerds.
