= Legion of Super Heroes (TV series) =

2006 American animated TV series

- Genre: Superhero; Adventure; Comedy; Science fiction; Action
- Based on: Legion of Super-Heroes by: Otto Binder; Al Plastino
- Developed by: Amy Wolfram
- Voices of: Michael Cornacchia; Shawn Harrison; Heather Hogan; Yuri Lowenthal; Andy Milder; Alexander Polinsky; Kari Wahlgren; Adam Wylie
- Theme music composer: Kristopher Carter
- Composers: Michael McCuistion; Lolita Ritmanis; Kristopher Carter
- Country of origin: United States
- No. of seasons: 2
- No. of episodes: 26

Production
- Executive producer: Sander Schwartz (season 1)
- Producers: James Tucker; Linda M. Steiner
- Editor: Joe Gall
- Running time: 21–22 minutes
- Production companies: Warner Bros. Family Entertainment; DC Comics; Warner Bros. Animation

Original release
- Network: The CW (Kids' WB)
- Release: September 23, 2006 – April 5, 2008

Legion of Super Heroes is an American animated television series produced by Warner Bros. Animation, adapted from the DC Comics series of the same name. It debuted on September 23, 2006, and centers on a young Superman's adventures in the 31st century, fighting alongside the eponymous group of superheroes. The show was produced by one of its main character designers James Tucker, a co-producer of the Justice League Unlimited series, for the Kids' WB line-up on The CW network.

The series drew on the rich history of the Legion of Super-Heroes, taking inspiration from stories set during all time periods of the team's nearly 50-year history in comics. It also had a tie-in spin-off comic book series, Legion of Super-Heroes in the 31st Century, that lasted 20 issues.

The series was cancelled after its second season.

== Development history ==
A few months before Legion of Super Heroes premiered, the Legion appeared in the Justice League Unlimited episode "Far From Home". The episode featured Supergirl traveling to the future and joining the Legion, leading audiences to think that it was intended to serve as a back-door pilot for a Legion series, and that it would be a DCAU spin-off. Producer James Tucker clarified that the series was deliberately created from scratch:

Let's get the myths out of the way. The Legion series was never tied to the Justice League Unlimited episode. Supergirl was never, ever going to be in the Legion. The true origin of the series came out of Cartoon Network's desire to have a Superman-centric series premiere when the movie Superman Returns premiered. Superman as part of the Legion worked for them. So the series was originally developed for Cartoon Network, then they passed and Kids' WB! stepped in. They, too, wanted a Superman-centric series with Superman fresh out of Smallville, learning to be Superman. That's the reality.

Early reports had suggested the title of the series would be Superboy and the Legion of Super-Heroes, but the official announcement in April 2006 confirmed the title as Legion of Super Heroes. The same announcement indicated that the series would air on the Kids' WB block of the new The CW network at 10 a.m.

=== Legal status/issues ===
At the 2006 Comic Con International, the production staff did not officially say whether legal issues at the time involving the ownership of Superboy had affected this series or whether changes were made to tie the series in with the Superman Returns film, but one significant change had been made since the announcement of the series. The original press release referred to "the young Superboy", while the revised press release, published in June, described the character as a young Superman. At the conclusion of the pilot episode, Clark adopts the superhero name Superman, and not Superboy. In the second season, which takes place two years after the end of the first season, the character is called Superman, without reference to his "young" status.

=== Second season ===
The second season has a darker and more mature tone than the first season and mostly focuses on Brainiac 5 and his relationship with his evil ancestor, the original Brainiac. In the second season, most of the Legionnaires have changed their appearances, e.g., Lightning Lad has longer hair and gains a robotic arm after Imperiex blasted off his right arm during a battle, and Triplicate Girl changes her codename to Duo Damsel after her white self is killed by an antimatter wave. As with the first season, a total of 13 episodes were created for the second season, which premiered on September 22, 2007. The show was not renewed for a third season.

=== Proposed third season ===
A third season was planned for production but ultimately canceled, partially because of 4Kids Entertainment taking over the Kids' WB! slot. It would have taken place three years after the end of the second season, introducing Sensor, Magnetic Kid, Supergirl, Tellus, Princess Projectra, and Shadow Lass while expanding the roles of background characters Blok, Wildfire, and Dawnstar. Additionally, Kell-El would still be a regular character but have a reduced role, with Wildfire being his replacement. The main focus of the third season would have been Brainiac 5 returning while trying to redeem himself after the second season's finale and Brainiac 6 trying to destroy the Legion. Also, producer James Tucker planned to make an adaptation of the story "The Ghost of Ferro Lad" to introduce Ferro Lad's long-lost twin brother.

== Characters ==
From left to right: Bouncing Boy, Saturn Girl, Brainiac 5, Superman, Phantom Girl, Timber Wolf, and Lightning Lad.

In the first season, the series revolved around a core group of eight Legionnaires but others appeared from time to time in recurring roles, similar in format to the Justice League Unlimited animated series.

=== Superman ===
The first season introduces a teenaged Clark Kent who is about to move from Smallville to Metropolis. He knows of his abilities but does not know what to do with his future (similar in nature to the Clark Kent featured in the Smallville television series). After traveling to the future, young Clark assumes the identity of Superman and gradually learns to control his abilities, becoming the hero he is destined to be. At the end of the first season, he returns to the present around the same time he left in the first episode.

In the second season, set two years later, Superman returns to the future, having gained more experience with his powers. Also, Superman X, a clone of Superman from the 41st century created to battle Imperiex, is introduced. When Imperiex travels back to the 31st century, Superman X is forced to follow him into the past and recruit the Legion to help him.

=== Core Legionnaires ===
Series producer James Tucker offered descriptions of the core team in a July 2006 interview at San Diego Comic-Con. As with other DC team shows such as Justice League Unlimited, not every core character appears in all episodes. The following descriptions apply to the characters as seen in the first season.

- Lightning Lad has lightning powers and is eager and hot-headed. The lightning bolt scar on his right eye sometimes flashes brightly in times of battle. He has a twin sister, Ayla, and an older brother, Mekt.
- Saturn Girl is a caring and thoughtful character with mental powers.
- Brainiac 5 is the smartest Legionnaire and can transform his robot body in various ways. Tucker stated that Brainiac 5's personality and design were inspired by the version of the character from Dan Abnett and Andy Lanning's Legion of Super-Heroes series.
- Phantom Girl has the ability to pass through solid objects, and can temporarily extend this ability to others. Tucker described Phantom Girl as self-centered and sarcastic, yet devoted to the Legion.
- Bouncing Boy is friendly and humorous, with the ability to make his body rubbery and springy. Near the end of Season 1, Bouncing Boy is elected leader of the Legionnaires, much to his surprise.
- Triplicate Girl was born with the ability to split her form into three identical selves.
- Timber Wolf, named Brin Londo, was transformed into a werewolf-like creature as a result of his father Mar Londo's experiments on him. Tucker described Timber Wolf as a "cool dude" whose feral appearance disguises his loneliness and insecurity.
- Chameleon Boy has the ability to shapeshift all or part of his body into something else, animate or inanimate, as well as utilize the strength and power of what he transforms into. He appears as a regular in season two. His father, R. J. Brande, funds the Legion.

=== Other Legionnaires ===
XS appears in the finale "Dark Victory" as a background character. Dawnstar and Invisible Kid also make cameo appearances in the finale, along with many other rarely seen Legion members.

In the first season, some Legionnaires were mentioned or shown as images before properly appearing. Fourteen members were shown during the season as already active: Blok, Bouncing Boy, Brainiac 5, Colossal Boy, Cosmic Boy, Dream Girl, Element Lad, Lightning Lad, Phantom Girl, Saturn Girl, Shrinking Violet, Sun Boy, Triplicate Girl, and Tyroc. Five more join the Legion through the course of the series: Superman, Timber Wolf, Matter-Eater Lad, Star Boy, and Ferro Lad.

The opening credits sequences used for first-season episodes included a glimpse of the Mission Monitor Board signs for many Legionnaires as well as shots of flying Legionnaires who would be seen in later episodes, though not all of those with Mission Monitor Board symbols appeared. At least four members of the Legion as seen in the comics appeared in some way on the show but had not joined by the end of the first season (Ultra Boy, Lightning Lass, Wildfire, and Polar Boy).

In the second season, Karate Kid appears in the opening credits with the other Legionnaires, though he did not appear until the fifth episode, in which Nemesis Kid also joins the Legion. Similar to Karate Kid, Sun Boy appears in the second season opening titles and makes semi-regular, though non-speaking appearances. Ayla Ranzz, the sister of Lightning Lad, also appears, but lacks powers and is not a superhero like her comic counterpart.

== Cast ==
=== Legionnaires ===
Character	Voice actor
Blok	N/A
Bouncing Boy	Michael Cornacchia
Brainiac 5	Adam Wylie
Chameleon Boy	Alexander Polinsky
Colossal Boy	Adam Wylie
Cosmic Boy	Wil Wheaton
Dream Girl	Tara Platt
Element Lad	N/A
Ferro Lad	Dave Wittenberg
Karate Kid	Keith Ferguson
Lightning Lad	Andy Milder
Matter-Eater Lad	Alexander Polinsky
Nemesis Kid	Keith Ferguson
Phantom Girl	Heather Hogan
Saturn Girl	Kari Wahlgren
Shrinking Violet	Kari Wahlgren
Star Boy	Bumper Robinson
Sun Boy	N/A
Superman (21st century)	Yuri Lowenthal
Superman X	Yuri Lowenthal
Timber Wolf	Shawn Harrison
Triplicate Girl/Duo Damsel	Kari Wahlgren
Tyroc	N/A
Ultra Boy	James Arnold Taylor

=== Villains ===
Character	Voice actor
The Fatal Five	
Emerald Empress	Jennifer Hale (Season 1); Tara Strong (Season 2)
Mano	N/A
Persuader	David Sobolov
Tharok	David Lodge
Validus	N/A
Mar Londo	Harry Lennix (Season 1); Dorian Harewood (Season 2)
Alexis Luthor	Tara Strong
Drax	Greg Ellis
Legion of Super-Villains	
Lightning Lord	James Arnold Taylor
Esper	Tara Strong
Hunter	Khary Payton
Ron-Karr	Shawn Harrison
Wave	N/A
Tyr	Khary Payton
Starfinger	Taylor Negron
Zyx	Lauren Tom
Mordru	Jim Ward
Sun-Eater	N/A
Controller	David Lodge
Imperiex	Phil Morris
Dominators	N/A
Computo	Adam Wylie
Grimbor the Chainsman	Lex Lang
Terra-Man	Jeff Black
Brainiac	Corey Burton
Roderick Doyle	Wil Wheaton
Dark Circle	
Grullug	Dave Wittenberg
Ontiir	Bumper Robinson

=== Other characters ===
Character	Voice actor
Winema Wazzo	April Winchell
Legion of Substitute Heroes	
Chlorophyll Kid	Alexander Polinsky
Color Kid	James Arnold Taylor
Infectious Lass	Kari Wahlgren
Porcupine Pete	James Arnold Taylor
Stone Boy	Yuri Lowenthal
Ayla Ranzz	Kari Wahlgren
Calamity King	Alexander Polinsky
R. J. Brande	Lex Lang

== Episodes ==
=== Series overview ===
Season	Episodes	Originally aired	
Season	Episodes	First aired	Last aired
1	13	September 23, 2006	May 5, 2007
2	13	September 22, 2007	April 5, 2008

=== Season 1 (2006–07) ===
No. overall	No. in season	Title	Directed by	Written by	Original release date	Prod. code	K6–11 rating/share
1	1	"Man of Tomorrow"	Ben Jones	Amy Wolfram	September 23, 2006	345–391	2.0/8
Fearing an attack from the Fatal Five, Brainiac 5, Saturn Girl, and Bouncing Boy travel to the 21st century to recruit a young Clark Kent into the Legion of Super-Heroes. He initially refuses, but accepts after being given the opportunity to hone his powers and learning that the Legion can return him to the exact moment he left. The other Legionnaires are apprehensive of Clark, but he ultimately proves himself and becomes Superman to help stop the Fatal Five. However, the Fatal Five manage to escape after the Emerald Empress teleports them away. Superman chooses to stay in the future for the time being.
2	2	"Timber Wolf"	Lauren Montgomery	Matt Wayne	September 30, 2006	345–392	1.8/8
The Legion receives a distress call from Mar Londo, a scientist who has been tracking down a wolf-like creature on the planet Rawl. After being enlisted to help Mar capture the creature, the Legionnaires become suspicious of him and eventually discover that the creature is Mar's son Brin, who he previously experimented on and transformed. Saturn Girl telepathically contacts Brin and helps him assume a more humanoid form, though he retains genetic damage that prevents him from ever fully returning to normal. The Legion then defeats Mar and his army of mutant animals and leaves Rawl, taking Brin with them as he adopts the codename Timber Wolf.
3	3	"Legacy"	Tim Maltby	Scott Sonneborn	October 7, 2006	345–393	1.6/7
Superman meets Alexis, a rich, yet lonely girl, after saving her from her malfunctioning mecha suit. Alexis invites Superman to spend time with her, but Brainiac 5 tells him that he should refuse this offer to patrol Metropolis. At Brainiac 5's insistence, Superman forms a compromise to spend one day with Alexis and go on patrol for the next several days. Superman and Alexis quickly become friends, but Alexis becomes jealous after Superman chooses to prioritize his duties with the Legion over her. She allies with the Scavengers, a group of technology thieves, and attacks the Legion with her mech, but Superman defeats her, with the ensuing destruction of Alexis's mech destroying most of her hair. Alexis is imprisoned at Takron-Galtos and vows revenge against the Legion.
4	4	"Phantoms"	Tim Maltby	Rob Hoegee	November 4, 2006	345–396	1.7/8
Superman is visiting the Superman Museum right before it closes. As he is leaving, he investigates one of the displays and accidentally activates a Phantom Zone projector. This frees Drax, a Kryptonian prisoner, and his two pets, who Superman nicknames Comet and Cupid. When Superman attempts to return Drax to the Phantom Zone, he retaliates and uses the Phantom Zone projector to send the Legionnaires to the Phantom Zone before destroying the projector. The Legionnaires manage to escape the Phantom Zone by combining their powers to create a portal by themselves. When the portal appears, Superman kicks Drax through it, trapping him back in the Phantom Zone.
5	5	"Champions"	Lauren Montgomery	Matt Wayne	November 11, 2006	345–395	1.4/6
At the Intergalactic Games, Lightning Lad comes into conflict with his brother Mekt, who sabotages the events to ensure his own success. Meanwhile, Superman and Phantom Girl meet with the latter's mother, United Planets president Winema Wazzo, having gained a seat at a skybox. While going out for snacks, Superman discovers a dark matter bomb hidden under the skybox and manages to stop it before it explodes. Shortly afterward, he discovers that the Fatal Five have infiltrated the games in disguise, deducing that they plan to kill Winema. The Legion defeat them with help from several of the competitors.
6	6	"Fear Factory"	Ben Jones	John Esposito	November 18, 2006	345–394	1.6/7
After being caught in a space storm, the Legion lands in an isolated space station called Quavermass 12, where two aliens offer them refuge. The Legionnaires are later subjected to simulations of their worst fears; as soon as they show fear, they are imprisoned in portraits. Eventually, only Superman and Brainiac 5 are left to stop the two. Brainiac 5 is faced with the Coluans, his people, who want him to return to them. Brainiac 5 is overpowered by the Coluans, but sacrifices himself to merge with and disable the station's systems. Superman destroys Quavermass 12's systems, apparently taking Brainiac 5 with it. He is distraught until Bouncing Boy reveals that Brainiac 5 entrusted Superman with a backup drive, with allows him to be revived. The Legionnaires ensure that the station's other victims are rescued before returning home.
7	7	"Brain Drain"	Tim Maltby	Rob Hummell	February 3, 2007	345–399	N/A
After the other Legionnaires become concerned about his behavior, Brainiac 5 explains that he is building a containment chamber for himself for the Alignment, a data-sharing process undergone by Coluans. He does not know how the Alignment will affect him, since he separated himself from the Coluan hive mind some time ago. During the Alignment, Brainiac 5 begins to malfunction, degrading his mind. Superman and Timber Wolf bring him to Zuun to retrieve the rare element Zuunium and cure him, but are hindered by the planet's hostile conditions and Brainiac 5's head being separated from his body while traveling through a portal. Superman ventures deep into a cave to retrieve zuunium, which heals Brainiac 5 upon contact. Superman, Brainiac 5, and Timber Wolf return home, reuniting Brainiac 5's head with his body.
8	8	"Lightning Storm"	Lauren Montgomery	Stan Berkowitz	February 10, 2007	345–398	2.0/8
The Legion is attacked by an octopus-like alien before being rescued by the Light Speed Vanguard, a rival group of heroes consisting of Hunter, Tyr, Esper Lass, Ron-Karr, Wave, and Mekt Ranzz, now known as Lightning Lord. As the Legion holds auditions for new members, Lightning Lad becomes disillusioned with the group and joins the Vanguard instead. Lightning Lad becomes suspicious of the Vanguard after learning that they charge others money for their services, eventually turning on the group. The other Legionnaires subdue the Vanguard, while Lightning Lord escapes with plans of his own.
9	9	"The Substitutes"	Ben Jones	Scott Sonneborn	February 17, 2007	345–400	1.8/7
The Legion of Super-Heroes holds a series of auditions, culminating in them recruiting Matter-Eater Lad and Star Boy. A group of rejected Legion applicants - Infectious Lass, Color Kid, Stone Boy, Porcupine Pete, and Chlorophyll Kid - band together to prove themselves as worthy heroes after being motivated by Bouncing Boy. The group makes ernest attempts to help out around Metropolis, but are unsuccessful, largely due to their powers doing more harm than good. They go on to battle the villain Starfinger in the Legion's absence, as the Legion are busy battling monsters who are destroying the Earth's ionosphere. The Legion later learns that Starfinger summoned the creatures, dubbed "Furries", to steal for him and was unaware that they would grow into the monsters. The applicants, now known as the Legion of Substitute Heroes, subdue Starfinger and steal his gloves to stop the threat.
10	10	"Child's Play"	Ben Jones	Marty Isenberg	February 24, 2007	345–397	1.7/7
Zyx, a young sorcerer from the planet Zerox, comes to Earth to cause chaos after becoming frustrated with his planet's strict laws. When Phantom Girl contacts Winema, she tells her that Zerox cut ties with the United Planets centuries prior, meaning that the Legion will have to put up with Zyx for the time being. Phantom Girl and Triplicate Girl travel to Zerox to get aid as Superman engages Zyx in a duel to buy them time. After Phantom Girl convinces them to help, Zerox sends a representative to retrieve Zyx, with the representative considering re-establishing contact with the United Planets.
11	11	"Chain of Command"	Lauren Montgomery	Amy Wolfram	March 3, 2007	345–401	1.2/5
The Legion travels to Winath, Lightning Lad's home planet, which is being ravaged by cosmic storms. Brainiac 5 explains that the Winathians previously built a power station to harness energy and turn it into usable power. However, the power station is not strong enough to withstand the most recent series of storms. After the station's core is destroyed, Cosmic Boy and Brainiac 5 rebuild it with a stronger capacity, quelling the storms and allowing the station to handle stronger impacts. In the aftermath, Lightning Lad becomes frustrated with Cosmic Boy because he is often too busy to be with the Legion in person despite being the group's leader. Bouncing Boy is elected to replace Cosmic Boy, in part due to his efforts in coordinating the Legion during the crisis on Winath.
12	12	"Sundown"	Tim Maltby	David Slack	April 28, 2007	345–402	1.4/6
13	13	"Sundown"	Ben Jones	Rob Hoegee	May 5, 2007	345–403	1.2/6
Part 1: Bouncing Boy begins doubting himself as the Legion's leader after failing a simulation of the Fatal Five attacking the Legion, which results in the simulated Legionnaires being killed. Despite his doubts, he is called to lead the Legion in dealing with a weapon that threatens to escape from the Fenton Arms Depot. Brainiac 5 identifies the weapon as the Sun-Eater, a gaseous creature capable of destroying stars. Despite the Legion's efforts, the Sun-Eater escapes the depot and heads into space. Brainiac 5 states that the Sun-Eater is in a vulnerable, low-power state and could be stopped before it reaches full power. The Legionnaires fail to stop it from destroying the sun of the uninhabited Cheyenne Delta system, with Ferro Lad blaming himself for missing a crucial energy blast that could have stopped the Sun-Eater. The Sun-Eater heads towards Earth's sun as the Legion is powerless to stop it. Part 2: The Legion frees the Fatal Five from prison and recruit them to help combat the Sun-Eater. Bouncing Boy and Brainiac 5 explain that they plan to build a solar transducer, which will turn the Sun-Eater's power against it and cause it to destroy itself. As the Sun-Eater's red sun radiation renders him unable to fight it, Superman is tasked with battling the Controller, whose species created the Sun-Eater. The Legionnaires build a special missile to kill the Sun-Eater, but it fails to activate. Ferro Lad flies into the Sun-Eater and sacrifices himself to act as a conductor and make the transducer work. The Legion creates a statue in Ferro Lad's memory, while Superman returns to his own time.

=== Season 2 (2007–08) ===
No. overall	No. in season	Title	Directed by	Written by	Original release date	Prod. code	K6–11 rating/share
14	1	"The Man from the Edge of Tomorrow"	Brandon Vietti	Michael Jelenic	September 22, 2007	345–521	1.3/7
15	2	"The Man from the Edge of Tomorrow"	Scott Jeralds	Greg Weisman	September 29, 2007	345–522	1.7/9
Part 1: An unnamed hero resembling Superman travels back in time to enlist the Legion to his cause. After bringing the Legion to his time and fending off a robot army, Superman and his creator, the robot K3NT, explain that he is a clone of the original Superman originating from the 41st century who was created to oppose the warlord Imperiex. During a battle with the Legion, Imperiex steals Superman's warp key and travels to the 31st century, altering the past. This creates an antimatter wave that begins erasing Superman's timeline from existence. The Legionnaires make their way to Imperiex's ship, intending to use it to travel back in time and escape the future's destruction. However, they are confronted by Imperiex's robots, with Triplicate Girl's white self being killed by the antimatter wave in the ensuing battle. Brainiac 5 manages to hack into Imperiex's ship and have the Legionnaires return to the 31st century, where they find Metropolis in ruins. Part 2: After returning to the 31st century, the Legionnaires discover that the Fatal Five and the Legion of Super-Villains have escaped from Takron-Galtos and imprisoned several of the other Legion members there. In the ensuing battle, Matter-Eater Lad damages the Emerald Eye of Ekron, leaving Emerald Empress powerless. However, Saturn Girl is attacked by Esper Lass and Tharok, rendering her catatonic. Desperate for help, Brainiac 5 retrieves Superman from the 21st century. Imperiex infiltrates the Legion's headquarters, allowing him to steal information from Computo. He uses this information to activate the Legion Cruiser's self-destruct function, destroying it. However, Chameleon Boy receives a replacement ship from his father R. J. Brande. The Legion breaks into Takron-Galtos and rescues the captive Legionnaires with help from Superman's clone. The clone agrees to stay with the Legion and is given the name Superman X to differentiate him from Superman.
16	3	"Cry Wolf"	James Tucker	J. M. DeMatteis	October 6, 2007	345–523	1.6/7
Timber Wolf is placed on trial by the Legion and sentenced to life imprisonment on Takron-Galtos after confronting and killing Mar Londo during a scientific convention on Heisenberg-7. However, Chameleon Boy and Phantom Girl believe him to be innocent and allow him to escape. The two take Timber Wolf to Heisenberg-7, where he investigates and determines that he really was guilty. Ashamed of his actions, Timber Wolf returns to Rawl, where he learns that Mar Londo is alive and manipulated him into killing a nanite clone in an attempt to get him back under his control. When the Legion arrives to capture him, Timber Wolf reverts to his bestial fully transformed state and attacks them. After hurting Phantom Girl, Timber Wolf regains control of himself and helps the Legion stop Mar. Mar is revealed to be a nanite clone and disintegrates, with the real Mar having escaped and continued his schemes. Timber Wolf gains full control of his abilities, gaining the ability to shift between his partially and fully transformed states at will.
17	4	"Chained Lightning"	Brandon Vietti	Matt Wayne	October 13, 2007	345–524	1.9/8
In flashbacks, the Ranzz siblings - Garth, Mekt, and Ayla - crash-land on the planet Korbal and are attacked by Lightning Beasts, with Ayla seemingly being killed while Garth and Mekt gain electric powers. In the present, Imperiex plans to harness an electric storm and power a tachyon cannon, and has recruited Mekt into his army. While fighting Mekt, Garth is attacked by Imperiex and loses his right arm, with Brainiac 5 and Shrinking Violet building him a prosthetic. The Legion eventually learns that the storm is Ayla, who had been transformed during the Lightning Beast attack years prior. Mekt helps Garth restore Ayla to her human form before willingly allowing himself to be imprisoned on Takron-Galtos.
18	5	"The Karate Kid"	Brandon Vietti and Scott Jeralds	Eddie Guzelian	October 27, 2007	345–525	N/A
Seeking help in fighting Imperiex, the Legion hold a recruitment drive and auditions, which culminates in them recruiting Nemesis Kid and Karate Kid. Nemesis Kid explains that he is a member of the Science Police and has been tracking down Grimbor the Chainsman, who the Legion previously failed to capture. Due to lacking superpowers, Karate Kid is initially shunned by the other Legionnaires, who believe that he will put himself in danger. This ultimately results in Karate Kid being discharged from the Legion. However, he earns the Legion's respect by stopping Grimbor after he takes down most of the Legion with a power-neutralizing gun. Karate Kid is fully inducted into the Legion.
19	6	"Who Am I?"	James Tucker	J. M. DeMatteis	November 3, 2007	345–526	1.4/7
Chameleon Boy infiltrates Imperiex's ranks disguised as Persuader to gather information for the Legion and has his mind reprogrammed to believe that he actually is Persuader to aid in the facade. After Imperiex discovers the facade, the Legion rescues Chameleon Boy and restores his memories. During this process, Superman remembers that he is really Ron-Karr after noticing discrepancies in his memories. After interrogating Ron-Karr, the Legionnaires learn that he had undergone a similar process to Chameleon Boy and replaced Superman. Ron-Karr, influenced by the conversion process, realizes that Imperiex never cared for him and helps the Legion to stop him from destroying Durla, Chameleon Boy's home planet.
20	7	"Unnatural Alliances"	Brandon Vietti	Keith Damron	November 17, 2007	345–527	N/A
A group of cowboy-like robots led by Terra-Man attack a remote farm where a boy named Abel lives. The Legion confronts the robots and trap them under stone, but Abel's robot caretaker is destroyed during the battle. After learning that Abel is an orphan, the Legion takes him in for the time being. Imperiex kidnaps Abel, revealing that he will grow up to create the cybernetic enhancements used by Imperiex. After learning this, the Legionnaires form a reluctant alliance with Imperiex to protect Abel and preserve the future timeline. Imperiex and Superman X work together to destroy Terra-Man; Imperiex teleports away once the battle is done, satisfied that the timeline remains unaltered. After Terra-Man is destroyed, the Legionnaires find a new guardian for Abel and bid him farewell.
21	8	"Message in a Bottle"	Scott Jeralds and Brandon Vietti	Joseph Kuhr	December 1, 2007	345–528	1.2/5
Imperiex invades the bottled city of Kandor inside the Fortress of Solitude, seeking to retrieve and weaponize the Messenger, a device that was originally created to stabilize Krypton. As the Legion struggles to stop Imperiex, Brainiac 5 accesses information from his ancestor, the original Brainiac. This allows Brainiac 5 to temporarily turn Kandor's artificial red sun yellow, giving its residents powers and allowing them to fend off Imperiex. The Legion uses the Messenger to restore Krypton and returns Kandor to its normal size, but Brainiac 5 is forced to erase Superman's memory of the events to preserve the timeline.
22	9	"In the Beginning"	James Tucker	Steven Melching	March 8, 2008	345–529	1.3/5
Cosmic Boy, Chameleon Boy, and Superman X attend a ceremony where R. J. Brande is set to be given an award. However, Grimbor attacks the ceremony and kidnaps Brande despite the Legion's efforts to stop him. As the Legion is tracking down Grimbor, Brainiac 5 explains how Cosmic Boy, Saturn Girl, and Lightning Lad met while traveling to Earth and rescued Brande from an assassination attempt. After investigating, the three discovered that Brande's business partner, Roderick Doyle, was behind the attack and intended to gain control of Brande's company. In the present, Doyle attempts to use Brande's star-producing machines to create a black hole. However, the Legion stops him before the process can be completed.
23	10	"Trials"	James Tucker	Steven Melching	March 15, 2008	345–530	0.8/3
Following his encounter with the Legion, Zyx is given a special wristband that negates his magic as punishment. Shortly afterward, Zerox is attacked by Mordru, a sorcerer who was banished from Zerox for using dark magic. One of the other sorcerers teleports Zyx to the Legion's ship, where he enlists their help to stop Mordru. Zyx undergoes a series of trials with Superman X to get his magic back while the rest of the Legion battles Mordru. However, the Legionnaires are overwhelmed and captured. Zyx overcomes the trials, regains his powers, and teleports himself and Superman X to Zerox to confront Mordru. Zyx and Star Boy combine their powers to trap Mordru and push him deep underground.
24	11	"In Your Dreams"	Brandon Vietti	Stan Berkowitz	March 22, 2008	345–531	0.8/3
The Legion battles the Dark Circle, a group of mercenaries who seek to destroy a United Planets satellite. They are assisted by Dream Girl, who has valuable precognitive abilities. Dream Girl foretells the Legion's battle with the Dark Circle, allowing them to best the Circle in combat. However, Lightning Lad distrusts Dream Girl due to her past as a fortune teller and con artist. She previously gave Lightning Lad's parents false hope of finding his lost sister Ayla. After Dream Girl has a vision of the Legion turning against her, she runs away and is kidnapped by the Dark Circle, who exploit her abilities to their benefit. The Legion soon defeats them and rescues Dream Girl, who reconciles with Lightning Lad.
25	12	"Dark Victory"	Brandon Vietti	J. M. DeMatteis and Michael Jelenic	March 29, 2008	345–532	1.1/5
26	13	"Dark Victory"	Brandon Vietti	J. M. DeMatteis and Michael Jelenic	April 5, 2008	345–533	1.4/6
Part 1: As the Legion prepares for Imperiex's final assault, Brainiac 5 struggles to prevent the original Brainiac from controlling him. He learns that Imperiex manipulated him into activating Brainiac's programming, intending to form an alliance with him. Despite his attempts to resist Brainiac, Brainiac 5 ultimately succumbs to his influence, intending to bring order to the universe. He kills Imperiex and takes over leadership of the Dominators. Brainiac 5 wounds Superman with kryptonite; despite the Legion's efforts, Lightning Lad declares that they were unable to save him. Part 2: Brainiac 5 embarks on a conquest across the universe, digitizing anything that stands in his way. The Legion sends Superman's body into space, but Superman X realizes that he is still alive due to their mental link and rescues him before healing him with a blood transfusion. While the Legion fights Brainiac 5's army, Saturn Girl transports Superman and Superman X into his mind to free him. After Brainiac 5 is freed from Brainiac's control, everything he had digitized is restored to normal. In the process, Brainiac 5 sheds his armor and assumes a fully organic form. Brainiac 5 leaves the Legion out of guilt, while Superman X returns to his future, which has been restored. Triplicate Girl's white self is revived alongside the future timeline and returns to the 31st century, where she reunites with her other selves. Meanwhile, unbeknownst to the Legion, Brainiac rebuilds himself using Brainiac 5's discarded armor.

== Awards and nominations ==
=== 2006–2007 season ===
The series was nominated for three Creative Arts Emmy Awards, a subset of the Daytime Emmy Awards. None of the nominations won their category.

- Outstanding Achievement in Music Direction and Composition.
- Outstanding Achievement in Sound Editing – Live Action and Animation.
- Outstanding Achievement in Sound Mixing – Live Action and Animation.

== Home video ==
The first season was released to home video in three separate DVD volumes, with four episodes each on the first two releases and five on the third. The complete Season 1 collection was released in a 3-DVD box set that collected the three individual volumes. All were released through Warner Home Video.

In July 2020, the entire series and the second season were respectively released on Blu-ray and DVD through the Warner Archive Collection. Season 1 volume 1 has a bonus featurette called "We Are Legion", and the series finale has an audio commentary with producer James Tucker, director Brandon Vietti, and the voice of Saturn Girl, Kari Wahlgren. These bonus features are also included in the Complete Series Blu-Ray.

The series is also available for purchase or streaming on various platforms, including iTunes, Amazon Prime Video, and formerly DC Universe.

Individual episodes have been released on various other DC home video releases; for example, the two-part episode "Dark Victory" was released an extra on the 4K Ultra HD/Blu-ray release of The Death of Superman.

Title	Release date	# of episodes	Episodes
Legion of Super Heroes Volume One	August 28, 2007	4	"Man of Tomorrow", "Timber Wolf", "Legacy", "Phantoms"
Legion of Super Heroes Volume Two	February 5, 2008	4	"Champions", "Fear Factory", "Brain Drain", "Lightning Storm"
Legion of Super Heroes Volume Three	September 9, 2008	5	"The Substitutes", "Child's Play", "Chain of Command", "Sundown" (Parts One and Two)
Legion of Super Heroes Season 1 DVD 3-Pack	September 15, 2009	13	Complete Season 1
Legion of Super Heroes: The Complete Second Season	July 14, 2020	13	Complete Season 2
Legion of Super Heroes: The Complete Series	July 14, 2020	26	Complete series (Seasons 1 and 2)

== Other media ==
=== Legion of Super Heroes in the 31st Century ===
A comic book based on the show's continuity was published under the title Legion of Super-Heroes in the 31st Century. According to the comic's writer, J. Torres, the name was chosen to distinguish itself from more specifically youth-oriented titles such as Justice League Adventures and Superman Adventures. The first issue was distributed during Free Comic Book Day 2007 in addition to being sold.

An interview concerning the comic confirmed that it would continue publication despite the series ending, and would also be telling stories that were to have taken place after the second-season finale. As of issue #20, the comic ceased publication.

==== Additional characters ====
While the comic incorporates the cast of the show, other characters from DC Comics have made an appearance.

- Green Lantern Corps – Legion of Super Heroes in the 31st Century #6
- Circe – Legion of Super Heroes in the 31st Century #7
- Martian Manhunter – Legion of Super Heroes in the 31st Century #11
- Lex Luthor, Lois Lane, and Perry White – Legion of Super Heroes in the 31st Century #13
- Bart Allen/Impulse – Legion of Super Heroes in the 31st Century #15
- Arm-Fall-Off Boy – Legion of Super Heroes in the 31st Century #16
- Booster Gold – Legion of Super Heroes in the 31st Century #19
- Metallo – Legion of Super Heroes in the 31st Century #20

==== Collected editions ====
Issues #1–7 were collected in the trade paperback Legion of Super Heroes in the 31st Century, Vol. 1: Tomorrow's Heroes (March 2008, ISBN 978-1-4012-1668-9).

=== Merchandise ===
A tie-in promotion with McDonald's Happy Meal took place in August 2007, containing eight figurines: Superman, Timber Wolf, Lightning Lad, Brainiac 5, Bouncing Boy, Mano, Tharok, and Validus.

Action figures by Mattel were not produced because of a lack of retailer interest.

The collectible miniatures game HeroClix produced a special starter set of the Legion, including a figure of Superman from the first season.
