= Controllers (DC Comics) =

Fictional extraterrestrial race existing in the DC Universe

- Controllers as they appear in Hal Jordan and The Green Lantern Corps #33 (November 2017), art by Jack Herbert.

Publication information
- Publisher: DC Comics
- First appearance: Adventure Comics #357 (June 1967)
- Created by: Jim Shooter (writer & artist); Mort Weisinger (writer); Curt Swan (artist)

Characteristics
- Place of origin: Maltus (formerly)
- Inherent abilities: Energy manipulation; Telepathy; Telekinesis; Immortality

The Controllers are a fictional extraterrestrial race in the DC Universe. They first appear in Adventure Comics #357 (June 1967), and were created by Jim Shooter, Mort Weisinger and Curt Swan.

== Storylines ==
=== Silver Age ===
Introduced during the Silver Age of Comic Books of the 1960s, the Controllers were created by Jim Shooter, Mort Weisinger and Curt Swan, and first appear in Adventure Comics #357 (June 1967). The Controllers originate from another dimension that was ravaged by war, and seek to protect the main universe from the same fate. They primarily use their mind-control abilities to prevent intergalactic war, but also create powerful weapons, including the Sun-Eaters, gaseous beings that devour planets and stars; and the Miracle Machine, a device that can turn any thought into reality. In one 1978 story, the Time Trapper is depicted as a renegade Controller.

=== Modern Age ===
In the Modern Age of Comic Books, the 1985 Crisis on Infinite Earths crossover series rebooted the continuity of the DC Universe. In the new post-Crisis continuity, the Controllers were originally part of a race of immortals called the Maltusians, who left Maltus and colonized the planet Oa. Now calling themselves Oans, they feel responsible for the catastrophic effects on the universe caused by the renegade Oan Krona. The group argues over ways to handle the situation. One group of Oans desires to dedicate their immortal existences to contain evil, becoming the Guardians of the Universe. Another group decides that evil should be destroyed and leaves Oa for another dimension, evolving into the Controllers.

In Darkstars #1 (October 1992), the Controllers form a peacekeeping group called the Darkstars, who wield exo-mantles powered by the Controllers' energy. The Controllers later disband the Darkstars, having become concerned that their agents are looking after their own agendas rather than those of the Controllers.

In the Blackest Night crossover storyline (2009–10), a small group of Controllers search for the orange light of avarice, hoping to create their own Corps. This group locates the orange light on the planet Okaara, only to be killed and assimilated by Larfleeze.

Following the 2016 DC Rebirth relaunch, a 2018 storyline in Hal Jordan and the Green Lantern Corps depicts the Controllers kidnapping Guardians of the Universe to use their DNA to create new Controllers.

== Powers and weapons ==
Similar to the Guardians of the Universe, the Controllers are immortal and possess vast psionic powers, including telepathy, telekinesis, and energy manipulation. The Controllers also have vast knowledge, which allows them to create advanced technology and weapons. Their most known weapons are the Sun-Eater, Miracle Machine, and the Darkstar exo-mantle.

=== Sun-Eaters ===
Sun Boy faces a Sun-Eater in Adventure Comics #353 (February 1967); art by Curt Swan and George Klein.

The Sun-Eaters are a gaseous species, later established as being created by the Controllers, able to destroy stars by absorbing radiation. In the Legion of Super-Heroes storyline "The Death of Ferro Lad", featured in Adventure Comics #352–353 (January–February 1967), the Legion recruits a group of supervillains, dubbed the "Fatal Five", to aid them in preventing a Sun-Eater from devouring the Earth's Sun. Ultimately, new Legionnaire Ferro Lad sacrifices himself to destroy the Sun-Eater.

In DC Comics Presents (vol. 1) #43 (March 1982), Mongul takes control of a Sun-Eater and wields it against Earth and Superman. Another Sun-Eater manages to extinguish Earth's Sun in the The Final Night (November 1996) crossover storyline. Yet another Sun-Eater is used to weaken and imprison Superboy-Prime in Infinite Crisis #7 (June 2006).

- A Sun-Eater appears in the Legion of Super Heroes animated series two-part episode "Sundown" (2007).
- A young Sun-Eater appears in the 2011 animated film All-Star Superman as a resident of Superman's intergalactic zoo in the Fortress of Solitude.
- A young Sun-Eater appears in two 2022 episodes of the animated series Young Justice as a guard in Metron's vault.
- A Sun-Eater appears in the My Adventures with Superman animated series episode "Pierce the Heavens, Superman!" (2024).

== In other media ==
=== Television ===
- A Controller appears in the Legion of Super-Heroes two-part episode "Sundown", voiced by David Lodge.
- The Controllers make a cameo appearance in the teaser of the Batman: The Brave and the Bold episode "When OMAC Attacks!".

=== Video games ===
A Controller appears in Green Lantern: Rise of the Manhunters.
