= Imperiex =

DC Comics character

- Imperiex as depicted in Superman: Metropolis Secret Files & Origins #1 (June 2000). Art by Pablo Raimondi.

Publication information
- Publisher: DC Comics
- First appearance: Superman #153 (February 2000)
- Created by: Jeph Loeb (writer); Ian Churchill (artist)

In-story information
- Notable aliases: Destroyer of Galaxies, Galaxy Slayer, Eater of Galaxies, Devourer of Galaxies, Lord Imperiex
- Abilities: Superhuman strength, speed, and durability; Flight; Unlimited energy manipulation; Vast matter manipulation; Universal forces control; Cosmic awareness; Entropy embodiment; Can induce a Big Bang event

Imperiex (/ɪmˈpɪəriɛks/) is a supervillain appearing in comic books published by DC Comics. He was initially introduced as an adversary to the superhero Superman before becoming a main antagonist for the crossover "Our Worlds at War".

Imperiex has made limited appearances in media outside comics, with Phil Morris voicing him in the animated series Legion of Super Heroes.

== Publication history ==
Imperiex made his debut on Superman #153 (February 2000), cover by Ian Churchill.

Imperiex first appeared in Superman vol. 2 #153 (February 2000), and was created by Jeph Loeb and Ed McGuinness.

== Fictional character biography ==
The embodiment of entropy, Imperiex takes the form of pure energy contained in humanoid armor. Since the dawn of time, he has repeatedly destroyed the universe to create a new one from the ashes of the old. He is first mentioned when Mongul II arrives on Earth, stating that Imperiex has destroyed Warworld and is heading for Earth. Mongul and Superman apparently defeat Imperiex, only to discover that he is a probe of the real Imperiex. Believing the universe to be imperfect, Imperiex intends to destroy it by destroying Earth and inducing a second Big Bang.

Before arriving on Earth, Imperiex obliterates countless planets and galaxies. The survivors of the dead worlds, along with Earth, Apokolips, and Brainiac 13, form a coalition, with Darkseid as its commander, to combat Imperiex. After arriving in the Milky Way Galaxy, Imperiex sends out probes that dig into several spots on Earth's surface as a prelude to Imperiex's demolition.

Earth's forces crack Imperiex's armor, intending to transfer Imperiex's energy back to the galaxies he had destroyed. However, Brainiac 13 commandeers Warworld and absorbs Imperiex's energies into himself, vowing to use them to rule everything. Superman dives into the sun to acquire a sufficient power boost to oppose Brainiac, but discovers that Warworld cannot be destroyed without triggering greater catastrophe.

Imperiex and Brainiac 13 are killed at the moment of the Big Bang. Artwork from Action Comics #782 (October 2001).

In response, a new plan is devised, with Lex Luthor activating a temporal displacement weapon which is combined with Apokoliptian energy. This allows Superman to transport both Warworld and Imperiex's and Brainiac's consciousnesses back in time to the Big Bang, destroying them.

== Powers and abilities ==
As the embodiment of entropy, Imperiex wields the power of the Big Bang. He can project powerful blasts of energy and create black holes capable of destroying entire universes. Imperiex also possesses superhuman strength, durability, and speed, and can create smaller probes resembling him. Imperiex is also known as Imperiex-Prime to distinguish him from his probes.

== In other media ==
=== Television ===
Imperiex as he appears in Legion of Super Heroes.

Imperiex appears in the second season of Legion of Super Heroes, voiced by Phil Morris. This version originates from Apokolips in the 41st century, possesses cybernetic enhancements, and was originally a gladiator before becoming a universal conqueror, with the artificial intelligence K3NT creating a clone of Superman named Kell-El to oppose him. After Kell-El travels to the 31st century to gain the Legion of Super-Heroes's help, Imperiex follows him through time and allies with the Fatal Five, the Legion of Super-Villains, and the Dominators. Imperiex manipulates Brainiac 5 into succumbing to the original Brainiac's influence, only to be betrayed and killed by him.

=== Film ===
The Legion of Super Heroes incarnation of Imperiex makes a non-speaking cameo appearance in Scooby-Doo! and Krypto, Too!.

=== Video games ===
Imperiex appears as a character summon in Scribblenauts Unmasked: A DC Comics Adventure.

=== Miscellaneous ===
- Imperiex appears in Injustice 2 #19.
- An alternate universe incarnation of Imperiex appears in the Justice League: Gods and Monsters tie-in comic book as the evolved monstrous form of Doctor Psycho.
