= R. J. Brande =

- R. J. Brande as depicted in Legion of Super-Heroes (vol. 4) Annual #6 (June 1995). Art by Jim Hall (penciller), Tom Simmons (inker), and Tom McCraw (colorist).

Publication information
- Publisher: DC Comics
- First appearance: As R. J. Brande: Adventure Comics #350 (November 1966); As The Durlan: Invasion! #2 (February 1989)
- Created by: E. Nelson Bridwell

In-story information
- Full name: Ren Daggle
- Species: Durlan (trapped in human form)
- Place of origin: Durla
- Team affiliations: Legion of Super-Heroes; L.E.G.I.O.N.
- Notable aliases: Rene Jacques Brande, The Durlan

Rene Jacques "R. J." Brande is a character appearing in DC Comics, primarily in association with the Legion of Super-Heroes. He first appeared in Adventure Comics #350, and was created by E. Nelson Bridwell.

== Fictional history ==
=== Pre-Crisis ===
R. J. Brande was originally a Durlan named Ren Daggle who was trapped in human form after contracting the deadly Yorggian fever. After the death of his wife Zhay, Ren leaves his children, Reep Daggle and Liggt Daggle, in the care of Zhay's sister Ji and leaves Durla with his brother-in-law Theg. The two respectively assume the identities of R.J. Brande and Doyle Brande. Brande becomes one of the richest men in the galaxy, using his technology to produce stars.

While Brande is traveling to Earth, Doyle sends assassins in an attempt to kill him. Rokk Krinn, Imra Ardeen, and Garth Ranzz, who are traveling on the same ship as Brande, save him from being killed and go on to form the Legion of Super-Heroes, with Brande as their sponsor.

=== Post-Crisis ===
In post-Crisis on Infinite Earths continuity, Brande is a 20th-century Durlan and founding member of the intergalactic police force L.E.G.I.O.N., known only as The Durlan. He is transported to the 30th century by Glorith, with an amnesiac Phantom Girl taking his place in L.E.G.I.O.N.

=== Post-Zero Hour ===
In post-Zero Hour continuity, Brande creates stargates instead of stars, but his role in the Legion's origins is unchanged. Additionally, he was intended to be the Martian Manhunter, but JLA editor Dan Raspler vetoed the idea. Brande later becomes President of the United Planets before losing the position during the "One Year Gap".

=== Post-Infinite Crisis ===
The aftermath of the Infinite Crisis mini-series restores an analogue of the pre-Crisis on Infinite Earths Legion to continuity. This continuity's version of R.J. Brande is assassinated by economic rival Leland McCauley during the events of Final Crisis: Legion of 3 Worlds.

== In other media ==
- R. J. Brande appears in the Legion of Super Heroes episode "In the Beginning", voiced by Lex Lang.
- R. J. Brande appears in Adventures in the DC Universe #10.
