= Invisible Kid =

DC Comics character

Invisible Kid is the name of two superheroes in the DC Comics universe, both of whom are members of the Legion of Super-Heroes in the 30th and 31st centuries.

== Publication history ==
The first Invisible Kid debuted alongside Chameleon Boy and Colossal Boy in Action Comics #267 by Jerry Siegel and Jim Mooney. He was introduced as a new member of the Legion of Super-Heroes. In Legion of Super-Heroes #203 (1974), Lyle was killed by Validus. Following his death, a second Invisible Kid, Jacques Foccart, was introduced in 1982. Lyle was resurrected following the Zero Hour: Crisis in Time! event, which rebooted the Legion's continuity.

== Fictional character biography ==
=== Lyle Norg ===
Invisible Kid

Publication information
- Publisher: DC Comics
- First appearance: Action Comics #267 (August 1960)
- Created by: Jerry Siegel; Jim Mooney

In-story information
- Alter ego: Lyle Norg
- Species: Metahuman
- Place of origin: Earth (31st century)
- Team affiliations: Legion of Super-Heroes
- Abilities: Ability to stay undetected from many kinds of means (ocular, auditory and telepathic).

The first Invisible Kid was Lyle Norg, an early member of the Legion who gained his powers from a chemical serum he invented. His abilities made him a valuable asset to the Legion Espionage Squad, of which he was a permanent member. Lyle also served one term as leader of the Legion. He was killed by Validus in Superboy and the Legion of Super-Heroes #203 (1974). Many years later, during the "Five Year Gap" following the Magic Wars, Earth falls under the control of the Dominators and withdraws from the United Planets. A few years later, "Batch SW6" - temporal clones of the Legionnaires - escape the Dominators' captivity, with a clone of Invisible Kid being among them.

==== Reboot ====
The original Lyle Norg is resurrected following the Zero Hour: Crisis in Time! event, which rebooted the Legion's continuity. In this version, Lyle is a professional spy who invented his invisibility serum while in Earthgov Intelligence's spy school. Rather than his scientific aptitude resulting in his getting on well with Brainiac 5, they had more of a rivalry. While Brainiac 5 is more intelligent, Lyle is more imaginative, being quicker to see unexpected applications for discoveries.

Lyle is the de facto leader of the Legion Espionage Squad, consisting of himself, Chameleon, Apparition, Triad, and Shrinking Violet, and was instrumental in bringing down the corrupt administration of United Planets President Chu.

According to The Definitive Guide to The Characters of the DC Universe (2004), he is in a homosexual relationship with Condo Arlik / Chemical King. This was never stated explicitly in the comic itself and never developed.

==== "Threeboot" continuity (2004-2009) ====
In the "Threeboot", Lyle Norg is a genius with a skill for xenochemistry who was used by his father to develop an invisibility serum. His father, an officer in the Science Police, used to bring him alien cell samples to experiment with. By the time Lyle had successfully created a serum, he discovered that his father intended to give his research to the Science Police. In response, Lyle used the serum on himself and lied about it before contacting Brainiac 5, who invited him to join the Legion.

==== Post-Infinite Crisis ====
The events of the Infinite Crisis miniseries restore a close analogue of the pre-Crisis Legion to continuity, as seen in "The Lightning Saga" story arc in Justice League of America and Justice Society of America, and in the "Superman and the Legion of Super-Heroes" story arc in Action Comics. Lyle is depicted as a member of this version of the team in Justice Society of America (vol. 3) #5 (June 2007), and Action Comics #858 (late December 2007), but this incarnation of the Legion shares roughly the same history as the original Legion up to the events of Crisis on Infinite Earths. Therefore, this version of Lyle is presumably deceased.

=== Jacques Foccart ===
Invisible Kid

Publication information
- Publisher: DC Comics
- First appearance: Legion of Super-Heroes (vol. 2) Annual #1 (1982)
- Created by: Paul Levitz; Keith Giffen (based upon the Lyle Norg character by Jerry Siegel and Jim Mooney)

In-story information
- Alter ego: Jacques Foccart
- Species: Metahuman
- Place of origin: Earth (31st century)
- Team affiliations: Legion of Super-Heroes
- Abilities: Ability to stay undetected from many kinds of means (ocular, auditory and telepathic)

The second Invisible Kid, Jacques Foccart, is a teenager from what was once the Ivory Coast. Jacques' younger sister Danielle has a life-threatening neurological disorder which appears to be incurable, with Jacques taking her to Brainiac 5 as a last resort. Brainiac 5 decides to utilize a piece of circuitry from Computo, a supercomputer he had created years earlier. Computo possesses Danielle's body and takes control of Metropolis. Jacques uses Lyle Norg's invisibility serum to save the Legion and becomes the second Invisible Kid.

==== "Five Years Later" ====
After the Dominators take over Earth, Jacques becomes the leader of a resistance against them alongside Tyroc and the Legion of Substitute Heroes. The resistance successfully defeats the Dominators, with Invisible Kid and Tyroc respectively becoming president and vice president of Earth. Following the destruction of Earth, Jacques resigns to rejoin the Legion and Tyroc becomes president.

==== Post-Zero Hour ====
In post-Zero Hour continuity, Jacques Foccart is a friend and classmate of Lyle Norg. Charma, a fellow student who had developed mind control abilities, forced Jacques to drink Lyle's serum as a test to see if it would be safe for her. Jacques was believed to have been killed by the serum, as Lyle had calibrated it to only work for himself. In truth, Jacques was saved by the Intelligence Division. The serum worked differently for him than for Lyle, granting him the ability to become invisible.

== Reception ==
Syfy ranked the first Invisible Kid as the 24th greatest Legion of Super-Heroes member, stating that during "his time in the 1960s, Invisible Kid was a constant, but not noteworthy presence, until he was killed by Validus. When the Legion rebooted in 1994, he became a major player, showing he was one of the savviest members of the team". Syfy ranked the second Invisible Kid as number 38 describing the character as "boring" and "notable because of his name and his Rogue inspired haircut". Syfy opined that despite "later becoming President of Earth, he never did a whole lot except shout French expressions".

== In other media ==
- The Jacques Foccart incarnation of Invisible Kid makes cameo appearances in Legion of Super Heroes (2006).
- The Jacques Foccart incarnation of Invisible Kid appears in Legion of Super-Heroes (2023), voiced by Zeno Robinson.
- The Lyle Norg incarnation of Invisible Kid appears as a character summon in Scribblenauts Unmasked: A DC Comics Adventure.
