= Brainiac 5 =

Comic book superhero

- Cover to Final Crisis: Legion of 3 Worlds #1 (2009). Art by George Pérez.

Publication information
- Publisher: DC Comics
- First appearance: Action Comics #276 (May 1961)
- Created by: Jerry Siegel; Jim Mooney (based on Brainiac by Otto Binder and Al Plastino)

In-story information
- Alter ego: Querl Dox
- Species: Coluan
- Place of origin: Colu
- Team affiliations: Legion of Super-Heroes
- Notable aliases: Brainiac 5.1; B-5; Brainy
- Abilities: 12th-level intellect; Mechanical aptitude; Force field via belt; Flight via ring

Brainiac 5 (Querl Dox) is a superhero appearing in comics published by DC Comics. He is from the planet Colu and is a long-standing member of the Legion of Super-Heroes in the 30th and 31st centuries. Brainiac 5 is a descendant of the villain Brainiac, with his efforts to distance himself from his predecessor being a core part of his character.

Brainiac 5 has been substantially adapted into other media, primarily in association with the Legion. He is voiced by Adam Wylie in Legion of Super Heroes (2006) and portrayed by James Marsters and Jesse Rath in Smallville and the Arrowverse respectively. A gender-swapped alternate universe version of Brainiac 5 appears in the fifth season of Supergirl, portrayed by Rath's sister Meaghan Rath.

== Publication history ==
Brainiac 5 first appeared in Action Comics #276 (May, 1961) and was created by Jerry Siegel and Jim Mooney. He was originally written as a descendant of Superman's enemy Brainiac. Several years later, when Brainiac was revealed to be a living computer, Brainiac 5 was retconned to be a descendant of his adopted son.

In DC Pride (2022), Brainiac 5 was revealed to be demisexual.

== Fictional character biography ==
=== Original continuity (1958–1994) ===
Brainiac 5 is a teenage Coluan of the planet Colu, who claimed to be descended from the original Brainiac, one of Superman's deadliest enemies, and wished to join the Legion as atonement for his misdeeds. When Brainiac is revealed to be an android created by the Computer Tyrants, Brainiac 5 learns that he is descended from Vril Dox, who was a clone of Brainiac and the leader of the rebellion against the tyrants. Brainiac 5's ingenuity led to the invention of, amongst other things, the Legion flight ring (perfecting an invention of the original Invisible Kid based on a metal discovered by Mon-El), the anti-lead serum that allowed Mon-El to leave the Phantom Zone, and the force field belt which became the signature device of the character. Another of Brainiac 5's creations had less beneficial effects: the super computer Computo, which attempted to take over the world, killing one of Triplicate Girl's three selves in the process. He successfully destroyed his creation with "an anti-matter force". Another experiment, performed in conjunction with honorary Legionnaire Rond Vidar, led to the transformation of fellow scientist Professor Jaxon Rugarth into the villain Infinite Man.

As time went on, Brainiac 5 began to be portrayed as unstable. Long attracted to Supergirl, Brainiac 5 creates a robot duplicate of her in his sleep, convincing himself that it is the real Supergirl. The Legion encounters the villain Pulsar Stargrave, who convinces Brainiac 5 that he is his long-lost father.

When Stargrave murders Ultra Boy's ex-girlfriend An Ryd, Brainiac 5 frames Ultra Boy for the murder. Chameleon Boy, who suspected Brainiac 5 from the beginning, finds proof when Brainiac's madness leads him to an attempt to destroy the universe using the Miracle Machine, a device that turns thoughts into reality. He is stopped by Matter-Eater Lad, who eats the machine, and both are committed to a mental institution (the energies of the Machine having driven Matter-Eater Lad insane). Brainiac 5 eventually recovers his sanity and rejoins the group. Shortly afterward, he is accused of having murdered Ryd himself. To prove his innocence, he finds Stargrave and defeats him. He later manages to cure Matter-Eater Lad's insanity. Around this time, he corrects another of his mistakes by finding a way to control Computo.

Brainiac 5 enters a state of deep melancholy upon the thousand-year anniversary of Supergirl's death at the hands of the Anti-Monitor during Crisis on Infinite Earths. However, as the Crisis eliminated Supergirl from existence, Brainiac 5 (as well as everyone else) has no recollection of her. Beyond this, however, Brainiac 5's history was relatively unaffected by the Crisis, although it would be some time before he received an origin that reflected the new Brainiac 1. Following the death of the pocket universe Superboy, Brainiac 5 is one of a number of Legionnaires who swear revenge on the Time Trapper. To this end, he recreates the Infinite Man. Infinite Man and Time Trapper seemingly destroy each other, but Brainiac 5 quits the Legion after being accused of murdering the former.

==== "Five Year Gap" ====
Five years after the end of the "Magic Wars", things had radically changed for the heroes, most notably the disbanding of the Legion and an ongoing war with the Khund empire, which had resulted in Earth's government (Earthgov) signing a deal with the Dominators. When Legion of Super-Heroes vol. 4 began, Brainiac 5 was dedicated to finding a cure to the Validus Plague, which had crippled Garth Ranzz.

Brainiac 5 joins the other Legionnaires in searching for the space pirate Roxxas, and is present when the team officially reforms. The reassembled Legion repels a Khund invasion fleet, and confronted Darkseid, but shortly thereafter, was swept into the war against Earthgov and the Dominators. During the Dominators' subjugation of Earth, the members of their highly classified "Batch SW6" escape captivity. Originally, Batch SW6 appear to be a group of teenage Legionnaire clones, created from samples apparently taken just prior to Ferro Lad's death at the hands of the Sun-Eater. Later, they are revealed to be time-paradox duplicates, every bit as legitimate as their older counterparts.

Not long after the destruction of Earth, Brainiac 5 discovers that the timestream is unstable and that the Legion's history is in a state of constant flux. This was the first indication of Zero Hour, the event that would lead to the Legion's history being rebooted. During a battle with Glorith, a time-warping sorceress, Brainiac 5 is rapidly aged into a weathered, enfeebled older man. When the Legion is forced to go on the run as fugitives after being framed by Universo and the Khunds, Brainiac 5 utilizes a high-tech combat suit to protect his body.

During Zero Hour, Brainiac 5 and his SW6 counterpart redouble their efforts to save the timestream and reality as the 30th century knew it. However, they are unable to save themselves from being swallowed up by temporal entropy, and their timeline is rebooted.

=== Zero Hour reboot continuity (1994–2004) ===
Following the Zero Hour event and the rebooting of the Legion, the "new" Brainiac 5 is depicted as extremely antisocial and disrespectful of his colleagues. It is later revealed that, even amongst Coluans, Querl Dox had been something of a loner, due to his even higher intelligence, interest in practical experiments rather than "pure" thought, and lack of concern about the consequences of his experiments. His mother, Brainiac 4, abandoned him at birth, having no emotional attachment to him. As a child, Querl was cared for by robots and given almost no contact with other living people.

Brainiac 5 is one of several Legionnaires who are trapped in the 20th century. He attempts to find a way back to his own time using a 30th-century Omnicom, a Mother Box loaned to him by Metron, and the responsometer of Veridium of the Metal Men. Unfortunately, his creation becomes C.O.M.P.U.T.O., which is destroyed and disassembled. While in the 20th century, he encounters his ancestors, Brainiac and Vril Dox, as well as Supergirl.

Upon his return to the 31st century, Brainiac 5 is part of a team that investigates a mysterious space anomaly. The anomaly "upgrades" Brainiac 5, causing him to become kinder and more social. Following his return from the anomaly, he befriends teammate Gates, who dubs him "Brainiac 5.1".

==== Legion Lost ====
Brainiac 5.1 is among the Legionnaires who are cast into a distant galaxy when the Stargate network was shut down. All of his teammates expect him to find a way home, but he is unable to do so, as he confesses to Saturn Girl. Eventually, Brainiac 5 is able to return to Earth using an interdimensional doorway he had found earlier. After the Legion's return, Brainiac 5 creates a replacement for the Stargates based on the doorway. Restoring the connection to the planet Xanthu, he learns that it had been at war with Robotica, the "robot homeworld", led by C.O.M.P.U.T.O. Brainiac 5 tricks Computo into upgrading itself, so it no longer seeks vengeance, but is outcast by the Coluans, who disapprove of artificial intelligence.

=== "Threeboot" continuity (2004–2009) ===
Cover to Legion of Super-Heroes (vol. 5) #1 (2005). Art by Barry Kitson

In volume 5 of the Legion of Super-Heroes title, Brainiac 5 is portrayed as similar to his ancestor Vril Dox in L.E.G.I.O.N.. He is just as arrogant and unthinking of others as the previous version was initially, but is more politically savvy. He has a tendency to put plans in motion without consulting Legion leader Cosmic Boy, who suspects him of planning a coup. He also has problems with Dream Girl as he hates that she is able to predict the future without scientific means. When Dream Girl is killed during Terror Firma's attack on the Legion HQ on Earth, Brainiac 5 becomes obsessed with "outthinking death." In a botched experiment to restore Dream Girl to life, he manages to store her consciousness in his own subconscious, enabling her to interact with him in his dreams.

Brainiac 5 eventually proposes to Dream Girl after spending the night together in which Dream Girl inhabited the body of a spiritualist. However, Princess Projectra attacks Dream Girl, viciously beating her and gouging out her eyes. Brainiac 5 manages to resurrect Dream Girl by transferring her consciousness into a cloned body, which restores her sight. Unbeknownst to Brainiac 5, the dark side of his mind, the avatar of his repressed urges and dark feelings, is granted a physical body by Princess Projectra.

=== Post-Infinite Crisis (2007) ===
The events of Infinite Crisis restore a close analogue of the pre-Crisis on Infinite Earths Legion to continuity. This incarnation of the Legion shares roughly the same history as the original Legion up to the events of the Crisis. In the Final Crisis tie-in Legion of 3 Worlds, the pre-Zero Hour Brainiac 5 meets his post-Zero Hour and Threeboot counterparts, who he works with to resurrect Bart Allen and Superboy and combat Superboy-Prime.

=== DC Rebirth ===
A young Brainiac 5 appears briefly during Justice League (vol. 3) (2017) by Bryan Hitch. He is not referred to by his name, only as the "brainy kid" by Cyborg. After analyzing the Timeless technology, he lends Cyborg his prototype flight bracelet so he can reach the weapon.

In Doomsday Clock, Doctor Manhattan is revealed to have altered the past, erasing Brainiac 5, the Legion of Super-Heroes, and the Justice Society of America from existence. They are resurrected when Superman convinces Manhattan to restore the timeline.

== Powers and abilities ==
Brainiac 5 possesses a twelfth-level intelligence which grants him superhuman calculation skills, eidetic memory, and exceptional technical knowledge. By comparison, the 20th-century Earth as a whole constitutes a sixth-level intelligence, and most Coluans have an eighth-level intelligence. His memory allows him to retain the knowledge of events that all others forget, such as their first meeting with three different Legions.

Brainiac 5 is also an inventor who created the Legion's flight rings as well as a force field belt, the supercomputer Computo, and a Time Bubble.

== Other versions ==
- Brainiac 417, a character based on Brainiac 5, appears in the DC One Million event. This version is a disembodied consciousness encased in a humanoid body and a member of the Justice League L in the 853rd century.
- Martinex 5, a composite character based on Brainiac 5 and Marvel Comics character Martinex, appears in the Amalgam Comics one-shot Spider-Boy Team-Up.

== In other media ==
=== Television ===
- Brainiac 5 appears in TV series set in the DC Animated Universe (DCAU).
  - Following a non-speaking cameo appearance in the Superman: The Animated Series episode "New Kids In Town".
  - He returns in the Justice League Unlimited episode "Far From Home", voiced by Matt Czuchry. This version is an organic being who was created to serve the original Brainiac before leaving him to join the Legion. After bringing Green Arrow, Supergirl, and Green Lantern to his time to help battle the Fatal Five, he falls in love with Supergirl, who decides to stay in the future to be with him and have a sense of belonging.
- Brainiac 5 appears in Legion of Super Heroes (2006), voiced by Adam Wylie. This version is a young, nanotechnology-based cyborg who sports monochromatic pink eyes as well as transformative abilities, which he primarily uses to extend his limbs and assume a mecha-like form. Additionally, he was previously part of the Coluan hive mind before breaking off through unknown means and strives to prove himself to the older Legionnaires, especially new recruit Superman. In the second season, Imperiex manipulates Brainiac 5 into being possessed by the original Brainiac until he regains control with help from Superman and his clone Superman X and assumes a fully organic form. Brainiac 5 leaves the Legion out of guilt while Brainiac secretly rebuilds himself using Brainiac 5's discarded armor.
- Brainiac 5 appears in the tenth season of Smallville, portrayed by James Marsters. This version was created by the Legion after they reprogrammed the original Brainiac.
- Brainiac 5, also known as "Brainy", appears in TV series set in the Arrowverse, portrayed by Jesse Rath.
  - First appearing in the third season of Supergirl, he travels back in time to the 21st century with fellow Legionnaires Mon-El and Imra Ardeen to help Supergirl defeat Reign. After the original Brainiac creates a virus that renders the 31st century too dangerous to return to, Brainy stays in the past and joins the Department of Extranormal Operations (DEO). In the fourth season, he becomes a mentor to and develops a romantic attraction towards Nia Nal while helping Supergirl and the DEO fight Agent Liberty and his Children of Liberty as well as Lex Luthor. In the fifth season, Brainy continues to explore his relationship with Nia, which is strained after an encounter with several of his multiversal doppelgangers leads to him disabling some of his personality inhibitors to maximize his intellectual capabilities and work with Luthor to combat Leviathan.
    - Rath's sister Meaghan Rath portrays a female alternate reality version of Brainy in the fifth season, in addition to Jesse Rath portraying several alternate reality versions in "The Bottle Episode".
  - Brainy also appears in the crossover events "Elseworlds" and "Crisis on Infinite Earths".
- Brainiac 5 appears in the Young Justice episode "Death and Rebirth", voiced by Benjamin Diskin. This version sports pink eyes, similar to his Legion of Super Heroes (2006) incarnation.

=== Film ===
- Brainiac 5 appears in Justice League vs. the Fatal Five, voiced by Noel Fisher. This version is bald and has monochromatic purple eyes.
- Brainiac 5 appears in films set in the Tomorrowverse, voiced by Harry Shum Jr.
  - Introduced in Legion of Super-Heroes (2023), this version was originally created to help Brainiac and the Dark Circle steal the Miracle Machine, but rebelled against them and became a student at the Legion Academy. He initially displays a feud with Supergirl, who mistrusts him due to his past, before they reconcile and enter a relationship after working together to defeat Mon-El and the Dark Circle.
  - Brainiac 5 appears in Justice League: Crisis on Infinite Earths (2024). After causing a temporal paradox, he, Dawnstar, and the Legion of Super-Heroes vanish as the 31st century ceases to exist.

=== Video games ===
- Brainiac 5 appears as a character summon in Scribblenauts Unmasked: A DC Comics Adventure.
- Brainiac 5 appears in Brainiac's ending in Injustice 2, voiced by Liam O'Brien.

=== Miscellaneous ===
- Brainiac 5 appears in Adventures in the DC Universe #10.
- The Legion of Super Heroes (2006) incarnation of Brainiac 5 appears in Legion of Super Heroes in the 31st Century.
- Brainiac 5 appears in Batman '66 Meets the Legion of Super-Heroes.
