= Garth Ranzz =

DC Comics character

- Garth Ranzz as Lightning Lad, as depicted in Final Crisis: Legion of 3 Worlds #1 (August 2008). Art by George Pérez.

Publication information
- Publisher: DC Comics
- First appearance: Adventure Comics #247 (April 1958)
- Created by: Otto Binder; Al Plastino

In-story information
- Alter ego: Garth Ranzz
- Species: Winathian
- Place of origin: Winath
- Team affiliations: Legion of Super-Heroes; Workforce; Legion Rescue Squad
- Notable aliases: Lightning Boy, Live Wire
- Abilities: Powers: Electricity generation and manipulation; Electrical energy manipulation; Electricity absorption; Electricity control; Electrokinesis; Electrogenesis; Lightning manipulation; Lightning element control; Lightning absorption, redirection, & solidification; Lighting generation; Lightning empowerment; Lightning immunity; Limited weather control; Molecular reconstruction; Ability to move at superhuman speed by channeling electricity internally; Abilities: Hand to hand combat (basic); Equipment: Legion Flight Ring

Garth Ranzz, also known as Live Wire and Lightning Lad, is a superhero appearing in media published by DC Comics, usually those featuring the Legion of Super-Heroes, a 30th and 31st century group of which he is a founding member. He has the superhuman ability to generate electricity, usually in the form of lightning bolts.

Garth Ranzz as Lightning Lad has appeared in various media outside comics, primarily those featuring the Legion of Super-Heroes. He is voiced by Andy Milder in Legion of Super Heroes (2006) and portrayed by Calum Worthy in Smallville.

== Publication history ==
The character first appeared in Adventure Comics #247 (April 1958), and was created by Otto Binder and Al Plastino.

== Fictional character biography ==
=== Silver Age ===
Lightning Lad's origin as depicted in Superman #147 (August 1961). Art by Curt Swan (penciller) and Sheldon Moldoff (inker).

Garth Ranzz is the older twin brother of fellow Legionnaire Ayla Ranzz (Lightning Lass), the younger brother of the supervillain Mekt Ranzz (Lightning Lord). The Ranzz siblings gained electrical superpowers after being attacked by Lightning Beasts on the planetoid Korbal. When they attacked the siblings, the Beasts inadvertently transferred their electricity into them, an effect which Mekt likens to an infectious disease.

After Mekt disappears, Garth travels to Earth in search of him. En route to Earth, Garth meets Imra Ardeen and Rokk Krinn, with the three going on to foil a plot to assassinate businessman R. J. Brande. With Brande's financial backing, the three found the Legion of Super-Heroes, based on the example of 21st-century hero Superboy.

Early in the Legion's history, Garth is killed battling Zaryan the Conqueror and resurrected following the sacrifice of Proty, Chameleon Boy's shapeshifting pet. A later retcon revealed that Proty's mind had taken over Lightning Lad's body, but this has since been eliminated from continuity.

At one point, Lightning Lad loses his right arm to a monster dubbed the "Moby Dick of space", replacing it with a bionic appendage. He eventually has his arm regrown; in the interim, scientist Lars Hanscom hypnotizes Lightning Lad into becoming the criminal Starfinger under the pretense of developing an organic prosthetic arm for him.

Lightning Lad goes on to marry Saturn Girl, with whom he has two sets of twins; sons Garridan and Graym and daughters Dacey and Dorrit. Garridan is abducted by Darkseid, transformed into Validus, and sent back in time, where he becomes a founding member of the Fatal Five and longstanding enemy of the Legion until he is restored to his original form.

During the "Five Year Gap" following the Magic Wars, Earth falls under the control of the Dominators and withdraws from the United Planets. A few years later, the Dominators' "Batch SW6", temporal clones of the Legionnaires, escape captivity. After Earth is destroyed, a few dozen surviving cities and their inhabitants reconstitute their world as New Earth, and the SW6 Lightning Lad assumes the code name Live Wire.

=== Zero Hour ===
After the Zero Hour: Crisis in Time! miniseries, Legion history was rebooted. In this version of events, the Ranzz siblings gained their electric powers after being stranded on the barren planetoid Korbal. They attempted to use the Lightning Beasts to recharge their cruiser, but were attacked and rendered comatose for several months.

Months later, Garth and Ayla awake simultaneously to find that Mekt had awoken around a week earlier, gained electrical powers similar to those of the Lightning Beasts, and vanished. After hearing this, Garth and Ayla keep the fact that they had developed similar powers secret, thinking that the lightning had corrupted Mekt and would soon corrupt them. They refuse to believe that Mekt become sociopathic, and run away from home to find him.

Hearing that Mekt may be on Earth, Garth gets on a shuttle bound for Earth via Titan, and meets Rokk Krinn and Imra Ardeen. When Imra discovers that four "maintenance men" on the ship are actually assassins targeting R. J. Brande, the three work together to stop them. Shortly after, Garth is involved in a bar-room brawl and arrested. As his cellmates are about to beat him, Triad arrives and bails him out. Brande convinces Garth, Rokk, and Imra to found the Legion of Super-Heroes, with Garth taking the codename Live Wire.

Garth later reunites with Mekt as he is scheming to enhance his powers by killing Lightning Beasts. Mekt, now more powerful than both of his siblings, attacks Garth and vaporizes his right arm. Ayla grabs Mekt's laser pistol and shoots him in the leg, delaying him while Garth's wound cauterizes. As Mekt prepares to finish them off, Garth and Ayla combine their powers to stop him. Mekt is arrested by the Science Police soon afterward.

In the "Legion Lost" storyline, Garth is killed in battle with Element Lad, who has become insane and assumed the name Progenitor after being lost in space. After the Progenitor is killed, he leaves behind several crystals that Kid Quantum takes to the graveyard Shanghalla. Garth's essence survives in the crystals and uses them to create a humanoid crystal body that resembles Progenitor and retains his original electrical abilities in addition to Progenitor's transmutation. In Final Crisis: Legion of 3 Worlds, Garth regains his original body using a lightning rod created by Brainiac 5, which enhances his transmutation and enables him to transform his own body.

=== Threeboot ===
In the Threeboot continuity, Garth Ranzz (again as Lightning Lad) remains a charter member of the galactic youth movement the Legion has become. Made acting leader of the Legion following the group's battle with Praetor Lemnos, Garth signs an accord which officially names the Legion as an arm of the United Planets and prevents the Legionnaires from being deported by the Science Police.

=== Post-"Infinite Crisis" ===
The events of "Infinite Crisis" restore an analogue of the pre-Crisis Legion to continuity. Lightning Lad is among the Legion's ranks and is still married to Saturn Girl. Lightning Lad later escorts Superman back to the present, where the two take time to reminisce on certain teenage misadventures in the Fortress of Solitude. The two are then joined by Batman, who reveals that the bodies of Karate Kid and Una were found in Gotham City. Lightning Lad and Batman react with hostility towards one another, given Batman's distrust of time travelers. Garth goes back to the 31st century with Karate Kid and Una's bodies, but not before giving Superman a new flight ring and giving Batman a veiled warning about upcoming struggles. Lightning Lad makes a further appearance in the storyline Doomsday Clock, where Doctor Manhattan erases him and the Legion from existence by altering the timeline so that the group never formed. The Legion's members are resurrected when Superman convinces Manhattan to restore the timeline.

== Powers and abilities ==
Lightning Lad has the ability to generate electricity within his own body without harming himself. This electricity he is able to discharge in the form of potent "lightning bolts". He can also create flashing lettering which can be seen from great distances. He has occasionally displayed limited control of the weather. In more recent versions of the character, Garth is also able to direct his electric powers internally so as to move at superhuman speed, with his top speed being approximately one-third the speed of light. Lightning Lad is immune to the harmful effects of electric currents, not only those currents that he himself generates.

As a member of the Legion of Super-Heroes, Garth is provided a Legion Flight Ring, which allows him to fly and protects him from the vacuum of space and other dangerous environments.

== In other media ==
=== Television ===
Lightning Lad as he appears in Legion of Super-Heroes (2006) (left) and Smallville (right)
- Garth Ranzz as Lightning Lad makes a non-speaking cameo appearance in the Superman: The Animated Series episode "New Kids In Town".
- Garth Ranzz as Lightning Lad makes a non-speaking cameo appearance in the Justice League Unlimited episode "Far From Home".
- Garth Ranzz as Lightning Lad appears in Legion of Super-Heroes (2006), voiced by Andy Milder. This version sports glowing blue eyes and a lightning-shaped scar over his right eye, both of which he obtained during the incident that gave him his powers. In the second season, Lightning Lad loses his right arm to Imperiex before Brainiac 5 and Shrinking Violet build him a prosthetic arm. Following this, he and his brother Mekt work together to restore their sister Ayla after discovering that she had become a disembodied energy being.
- Garth Ranzz as Lightning Lad appears in the Smallville episode "Legion", portrayed by Calum Worthy. This version is an overzealous fan of Clark Kent.

=== Film ===
- Garth Ranzz as Lightning Lad appears in Lego DC Comics Super Heroes: Justice League: Cosmic Clash, voiced again by Andy Milder. This version comes from a future Earth that Brainiac conquered by the year 2116.
- Garth Ranzz as Lightning Lad makes a non-speaking appearance in Legion of Super-Heroes (2023).
- The Legion of Super Heroes (2006) incarnation of Lightning Lad makes a non-speaking cameo appearance in Scooby-Doo! and Krypto, Too!.

=== Video games ===
- Garth Ranzz as Lightning Lad appears as a character summon in Scribblenauts Unmasked: A DC Comics Adventure.
- Garth Ranzz as Lightning Lad makes a non-speaking cameo appearance in Brainiac's ending in Injustice 2.

=== Miscellaneous ===
- Garth Ranzz as Live Wire appears in Adventures in the DC Universe #10.
- Garth Ranzz as Lightning Lad appears in Legion of Super Heroes in the 31st Century.
- Garth Ranzz as Lightning Lad appears in Batman '66 Meets the Legion of Super-Heroes.
