= Ferro Lad =

DC Comics character

- Ferro Lad on the cover of Adventure Comics #352 (January 1967). Art by Curt Swan and George Klein.

Publication information
- Publisher: DC Comics
- First appearance: Adventure Comics #346 (July 1966)
- Created by: Jim Shooter

In-story information
- Alter ego: Andrew Nolan
- Species: Metahuman
- Place of origin: Earth (31st century)
- Team affiliations: Legion of Super-Heroes
- Notable aliases: Ferro
- Abilities: Iron mimicry; Superhuman strength, stamina, and durability; Flight via ring

Ferro Lad (Andrew Nolan) is a superhero appearing in DC Comics, primarily as a member of the Legion of Super-Heroes in the 30th and 31st centuries. In post-Zero Hour continuity, he is simply known as Ferro.

Ferro Lad was initially a short-lived member of the Legion; he was introduced in Adventure Comics #346 (1966) and killed during the storyline "The Death of Ferro Lad" (1967). Decades after Ferro Lad's death, a clone of him was introduced in 1991 as part of "Batch SW6", a group of temporal clones of the Legionnaires. In 1994, following the Zero Hour reboot, the Legion's continuity was rebooted and the original Ferro Lad resurrected.

Ferro Lad has made minor appearances in other media, primarily those featuring the Legion. He is voiced by Dave Wittenberg in the animated series Legion of Super Heroes (2006).

== Publication history ==
Ferro Lad first appeared in Adventure Comics #346 (July 1966) and was created by Jim Shooter. Shooter intended Ferro Lad to be black, but editor Mort Weisinger vetoed the idea, saying "we'll lose our distribution in the South".

In a 2003 interview, Shooter said that he killed Ferro Lad out of annoyance towards being unable to make him black. In a 2011 blog post, Shooter offered a different explanation: that Ferro Lad's powers enabled him to survive entering the Sun-Eater's core.

The Life and Death of Ferro Lad (ISBN 978-1-4012-2193-5), a hardcover trade paperback collecting Ferro Lad's Silver Age appearances, was released in 2009.

== Fictional character biography ==
=== Silver Age ===
Andrew Nolan is a metahuman with the power to transform himself into living iron. He has a twin brother named Douglas who has the same power. Both twins have deformed faces as a side effect of the mutation that gave them their powers, which they hide with iron masks.

Ferro Lad is only a Legionnaire for a short time before sacrificing himself to destroy the alien Sun-Eater with a bomb. His self-sacrifice to save the galaxy made him legendary, despite his short tenure as a Legionnaire. Many later Silver Age stories include references to his death, and a statue erected in his memory is often seen in the Legion's headquarters.

Following the Magic Wars, Earth falls under the control of the Dominators and withdraws from the United Planets. Some time thereafter, the members of the Dominators' "Batch SW6" escape captivity. Batch SW6 are initially believed to be genetic clones of the Legionnaires, but are later revealed to be temporal duplicates. After Earth is destroyed, a few dozen surviving cities and their inhabitants reconstitute their world as New Earth. The SW6 Legionnaires remain, and their version of Ferro Lad shortens his code name to Ferro.

=== Post-Zero Hour ===
In post-Zero Hour continuity, he is known as Ferro and comes from 20th-century Earth. He and his twin brother, Douglas, are the sons of actress Nancy Nolan, who abandoned them because of their facial deformities. Left in the care of unscrupulous scientist Doc 30, Andrew escaped while Douglas remained behind.

When Earth was dying due to the sun being extinguished in The Final Night event, Ferro helps Perry White, who is determined to not miss a single day of delivery at the Daily Planet. He becomes involved with the Legion of Super-Heroes, who were stranded in the present day. The Legion joins with dozens of other superheroes to save Earth. Ferro attempts to sacrifice himself to stop the Sun-Eater, but is saved by Hal Jordan, who sacrifices himself instead.

When the Legion returns to their home time, Ferro goes with them and joins the group for some time until several of the team are lost in a rift. Ferro goes with Karate Kid to Steeple, a planet that is only accessible for a short period every ten years before access to it is blocked by a black hole. While on Steeple, Ferro is beaten by an escaped convict, leaving him trapped in iron form. Ferro and Karate Kid escape Steeple and work with Sensor and Shikari to stop Universo.

=== The Lightning Saga ===
The events of the Infinite Crisis miniseries restore a close analogue of the pre-Crisis Legion to continuity. Andrew is depicted as a member of this version of the team in Justice Society of America (vol. 3) #5 (June 2007), and Action Comics #858 (December 2007). However, this incarnation of the Legion shares roughly the same history as the original Legion up to the events of Crisis on Infinite Earths. Therefore, this version of Andrew is presumably deceased.

== Powers and abilities ==
Ferro Lad can transform into organic metal, which gives him enhanced strength and durability. As a member of the Legion of Super-Heroes, he is provided with a Legion Flight Ring, which allows him to fly and protects him from the vacuum of space and other dangerous environments. He also has a built-in radio mask for communication in airless space.

== Other versions ==
- An alternate universe version of Douglas Nolan who succeeded Andrew as Ferro Lad appears in Legion of Super-Heroes (vol. 2) #300.
- Ferro Lad, a fusion of Ferro Lad and Marvel Comics character Colossus, appears in the Amalgam Comics universe.

== In other media ==
=== Television ===
- A statue of Ferro Lad appears in the Justice League Unlimited episode "Far from Home".
- Ferro Lad appears in Legion of Super Heroes (2006), voiced by Dave Wittenberg. In his most notable appearance in the two-part season one finale "Sundown", an adaptation of the Sun-Eater story arc, he sacrifices himself to destroy the Sun-Eater, with his body subsequently ending up in an asteroid. Additionally, according to series producer James Tucker, his long-lost twin brother would have appeared had the show been renewed for a third season.

=== Film ===
- A statue of Ferro Lad appears in Justice League vs. the Fatal Five.
- Ferro Lad makes a cameo appearance in Legion of Super-Heroes (2023).

=== Video games ===
Ferro Lad appears as a character summon in Scribblenauts Unmasked: A DC Comics Adventure.

=== Miscellaneous ===
- Ferro Lad appears in Adventures in the DC Universe #10.
- Ferro Lad appears in Batman '66 Meets the Legion of Super-Heroes.

== See also ==
- The Death of Ferro Lad
