= Reep Daggle =

DC Comics character

Chameleon Boy
- Reep Daggle as Chameleon Boy, as depicted in Who's Who: The Definitive Directory of the DC Universe #4 (June 1985). Art by Keith Giffen and Karl Kesel.

Publication information
- Publisher: DC Comics
- First appearance: Action Comics #267 (August 1960)
- Created by: Jerry Siegel; Jim Mooney

In-story information
- Alter ego: Reep Daggle
- Species: Durlan
- Place of origin: Durla
- Team affiliations: Legion of Super-Heroes
- Notable aliases: Chameleon, Cham
- Abilities: Shapeshifting; Elasticity; Enhanced senses

Reep Daggle, also known as Chameleon Boy and Chameleon, is a superhero appearing in American comic books published by DC Comics, primarily as a member of the Legion of Super-Heroes in the 30th and 31st centuries.

Reep Daggle as Chameleon Boy has appeared in various media outside comics, primarily those featuring the Legion of Super-Heroes. He is voiced by Alexander Polinsky in Legion of Super Heroes (2006) and Dee Bradley Baker in Young Justice.

== Publication history ==
Chameleon Boy first appeared in Action Comics #267 (August 1960) and was created by Jerry Siegel and Jim Mooney.

== Fictional character biography ==
Reep Daggle is from the planet Durla, whose inhabitants, the Durlans, developed shapeshifting abilities to adapt to an environment destroyed by nuclear war. He has orange skin, pointed ears and antennae, and has no hair in his usual humanoid form. He is the son of Legion financier R. J. Brande, who was trapped in the form of a human after contracting Yorggian fever. However, Reep does not learn that Brande is his father for many years due to him and his twin brother Liggt being raised by their aunt Ji. Due to being twins, Reep and Liggt are forced to fight to the death, with Reep winning and killing Liggt.

As Durlans are viewed with suspicion by other species, Reep applies for membership in the Legion to set a positive example. His powers and deductive reasoning make him skilled in espionage, with him becoming the leader of the Legion's Espionage Squad. Reep acquires a protoplasmic alien named Proty, who also possesses shapeshifting abilities and becomes a beloved Legion mascot.

=== Zero Hour reboot ===
Post-Zero Hour, Reep is known simply as 'Chameleon' and is unrelated to R. J. Brande. He is the son of Durla's spiritual leader and heir to the title, though he refuses to accept the role, believing that he serves his people better as part of the Legion.

=== 2005 "Threeboot" ===
In the Threeboot continuity, Reep is still referred to as Chameleon, but is now an androgynous humanoid who lacks antennae.

=== Post-Infinite Crisis ===
In Infinite Crisis, Chameleon Boy is included in the Legion, but is considered "missing". In the series Superman, it is revealed that that he has been posing as a member of the Science Police. In Adventure Comics (vol. 2), it is revealed that Chameleon Boy is part of a secret team sent to the 21st century by R. J. Brande to save the future.

In Doomsday Clock, it is revealed that Doctor Manhattan previously altered the past, erasing Chameleon Boy, the Justice Society of America, and the Legion of Super-Heroes from existence. The two groups are resurrected when Superman convinces Manhattan to restore the timeline.

== Powers and abilities ==
As a Durlan, Chameleon Boy possesses innate shapeshifting abilities and the ability to transform into forms both larger and smaller than he is, creating or disregarding mass. He can elongate his body and rearrange his internal anatomy without entirely transforming.

As a member of the Legion of Super-Heroes, Chameleon Boy is provided a Legion Flight Ring, which allows him to fly and protects him from the vacuum of space and other dangerous environments.

== In other media ==
=== Television ===
Chameleon Boy (left) as he appears in Superman: The Animated Series

- Reep Daggle as Chameleon Boy appears in the Superman: The Animated Series episode "New Kids in Town", voiced by Jason Priestley.
- Reep Daggle as Chameleon Boy makes a non-speaking appearance in the Justice League Unlimited episode "Far From Home".
- Reep Daggle as Chameleon Boy appears in Legion of Super Heroes (2006), voiced by Alexander Polinsky.
- Reep Daggle as Chameleon Boy appears in Young Justice, voiced by Dee Bradley Baker. This version sports a reptilian appearance.

=== Film ===
- Reep Daggle as Chameleon Boy makes a non-speaking appearance in Justice League vs. the Fatal Five.
- Reep Daggle as Chameleon Boy makes a non-speaking appearance in Legion of Super-Heroes (2023).
- The Legion of Super Heroes (2006) incarnation of Chameleon Boy makes a non-speaking cameo appearance in Scooby-Doo! and Krypto, Too!.

=== Video games ===
Reep Daggle as Chameleon Boy appears as a character summon in Scribblenauts Unmasked: A DC Comics Adventure.

=== Miscellaneous ===
- Reep Daggle as Chameleon Boy appears in Smallville Season 11.
- Reep Daggle as Chameleon Boy appears in Adventures in the DC Universe #10.
- Reep Daggle as Chameleon Boy appears in Legion of Super Heroes in the 31st Century.
- Reep Daggle as Chameleon Boy appears in the one-shot comic Batman '66 Meets the Legion of Super-Heroes.

== Cultural impact ==
Chameleon Boy's design served as inspiration for the eponymous character of Resident Alien.
