= Legion of Super-Heroes (1958 team) =

1958 version of the Legion of Super-Heroes

- Cover of Adventure Comics #247, the first appearance of the Legion of Super-Heroes (April 1958); Art by Curt Swan and Stan Kaye

Group publication information
- Publisher: DC Comics
- First appearance: Adventure Comics #247 (April 1958)
- Created by: Otto Binder; Al Plastino

Roster
- See: List of Legion of Super-Heroes members

Legion of Super-Heroes
- : Legion of Super-Heroes #1 (February 1973). Cover art by Nick Cardy.

Series publication information
- Publisher: DC Comics
- Schedule: Monthly
- Format: List: (vol. 1) Limited series (vol. 2–7) Ongoing series
- Genre: Superhero
- Publication date: List: (vol. 1) February – July 1973 (vol. 2) January 1980 – July 1985 (vol. 3) August 1984 – August 1989 (vol. 4) November 1989 – March 2000 (vol. 5) February 2005 – March 2009 (vol. 6) July 2010 – October 2011 (vol. 7) November 2011 – October 2013
- Number of issues: List: (vol. 1): 4 (reprinted stories) (vol. 2): 67 (55 and 12 issues as Tales of the Legion of Super-Heroes) and 3 Annuals (Note: Tales of the Legion of Super-Heroes continued publication for another 29 issues (#326–354, August 1985 – December 1987), reprinting stories from Legion of Super-Heroes volume 3.) (vol. 3): 63 and 4 Annuals (vol. 4): 127 and 7 Annuals (vol. 5): 28 (#1–15, #38–50) (continued from Supergirl and the...) (vol. 6): 16 (vol. 7) 23

Creative team
- Writer(s): List: (vol. 2) Gerry Conway Roy Thomas Paul Levitz (vol. 3) Paul Levitz (vol. 4) Tom Bierbaum Mark Waid Andy Lanning (vol. 5) Mark Waid Jim Shooter (vol. 6–7) Paul Levitz
- Penciller(s): List: (vol. 2) Joe Staton Jimmy Janes Pat Broderick Keith Giffen (vol. 3) Keith Giffen Steve Lightle Greg LaRocque (vol. 4) Keith Giffen Jason Pearson Stuart Immonen Lee Moder Jason Armstrong Scott Kolins (vol. 5) Barry Kitson Francis Manapul (vol. 6) Yildiray Cinar (vol. 7) Francis Portela Scott Kolins
- Inker(s): List: (vol. 2) David Hunt Frank Chiaramonte Bruce Patterson Larry Mahlstedt (vol. 3) Larry Mahlstedt Mike DeCarlo (vol. 4) Al Gordon Karl Story Ron Boyd Ray Kryssing (vol. 5) Mick Gray John Livesay (vol. 6) Wayne Faucher (vol. 7)
- Colorist(s): List: (vol. 2) Carl Gafford (vol. 3) Carl Gafford (vol. 4) Tom McCraw
- Creator(s): Otto Binder; Al Plastino

Collected editions
- 'The Great Darkness Saga': ISBN 0-930289-43-9

The 1958 version of the Legion of Super-Heroes (also called the original/Preboot Legion) is a fictional superhero team in the 31st century of the DC Comics Universe. The team is the first incarnation of the Legion of Super-Heroes, and was followed by the 1994 and 2004 rebooted versions. It first appeared in Adventure Comics #247 (April 1958) and was created by Otto Binder and Al Plastino.

== Publication history ==
=== Superboy's supporting cast ===
Superboy was the featured series in Adventure Comics in the 1950s. In Adventure Comics #247 (April 1958) by writer Otto Binder and artist Al Plastino, Superboy encounters Lightning Boy, Saturn Girl, and Cosmic Boy, teenage superheroes from the 30th century who were inspired by him. After a series of tests, Superboy is awarded membership and returns to his own time.

Cover of Adventure Comics #300 (Sept. 1962), which was the first issue of the Legion run. Art by Curt Swan and George Klein.

Although intended as a one-off story focusing on Superboy, the Legion proved popular and returned in Adventure Comics #267 (December 1959). In this story, Lightning Boy is renamed Lightning Lad and the members are redesigned. The Legion's popularity grew, and they appeared in further stories in Adventure Comics, Action Comics, and other titles edited by Mort Weisinger over the next few years. The ranks of the Legion, only hinted at in those first two stories, was filled with new heroes such as Chameleon Boy, Invisible Kid, Colossal Boy, Star Boy, Brainiac 5, Triplicate Girl, Shrinking Violet, Sun Boy, Bouncing Boy, Phantom Girl, Ultra Boy, and Supergirl.

In Adventure Comics #300 (September 1962), the Legion received their own regular feature, cover-billed "Superboy in 'Tales of the Legion of Super-Heroes'". While they would share space with Superboy solo stories for a couple of years, they displaced Superboy from the title entirely as their popularity grew. Lightning Lad was killed in Adventure Comics #304 (January 1963) and revived in issue #312 (September 1963).

Adventure Comics established the Legion's general workings and environment. A club of teenagers, they operated out of a clubhouse in the shape of an inverted yellow rocket ship. The position of Legion leader rotated among the membership. Each Legionnaire had to possess one natural superpower which no other member possessed; despite this, several members had overlapping powers, particularly Superboy, Supergirl, Mon-El, and Ultra Boy. Some issues included comical moments where candidates with unusual, weak, or dangerous abilities would try out for membership and be rejected; five of these flawed candidates went on to form the Legion of Substitute Heroes. The Legion was based on Earth and protected an organization of humans and aliens called the United Planets. The regular police force in the United Planets was the Science Police. The setting for each story was 1000 years from the date of publication.

In 1966, Jim Shooter became the regular writer of the Legion stories, with Curt Swan, and later Win Mortimer, as artists. Shooter wrote the story in which Ferro Lad died – the first "real" death of a Legionnaire (although Lightning Lad had been believed dead for a while before) – and introduced many other enduring Legion concepts, including the Fatal Five, Karate Kid, Princess Projectra, Shadow Lass, the Dark Circle, Mordru, and the "Adult Legion", a possible future version of the Legion.

The Legion's last appearance in Adventure Comics was #380 (May 1969), and they were displaced by Supergirl in the next issue. The early 1970s saw the Legion relegated to the status of back-up feature. First, the team's stories were moved to Action Comics for issues #377–392 (June 1969 – September 1970). Following Mort Weisinger's retirement from DC, the Legion was passed to the oversight of editor Murray Boltinoff and began appearing occasionally as a backup in Superboy, starting with #172 (March 1971), with writers E. Nelson Bridwell and Cary Bates and artist George Tuska. Dave Cockrum began drawing the series with Superboy #184 (April 1972), again increasing the team's popularity.

=== Superboy and their own title ===
The Legion of Super-Heroes as seen in the 1976 DC Calendar. Art by Neal Adams and Dick Giordano.

The first comic book published under the title Legion of Super-Heroes was a four-issue series published in 1973 that reprinted Legion tales from Adventure Comics. In the same year, the Legion returned to cover billing on a book when Superboy became Superboy starring the Legion of Super-Heroes with #197 (August 1973). Crafted by Bates and Cockrum, the feature proved popular and saw such events as the wedding of Bouncing Boy and Duo Damsel in Superboy #200 (Feb 1974). Issues #202 (June 1974) and #205 (Dec. 1974) of the series were in the 100 Page Super Spectacular format. Cockrum was replaced on art by Mike Grell as of issue #203 (August 1974) which featured the death of Invisible Kid. With #231 (September 1977), the book's title officially changed to Superboy and the Legion of Super-Heroes and also became a "giant-size" title. At this point, the book was written by longtime fan Paul Levitz and drawn by James Sherman, although Gerry Conway frequently wrote as well. Saturn Girl and Lightning Lad were married in All-New Collectors' Edition #C-55 (1978), a treasury-sized special written by Levitz and drawn by Grell. In #241–245 (July–December 1978) Levitz and Sherman (and then Joe Staton) produced what was at that time the most ambitious Legion storyline: "Earthwar", a galactic war between the United Planets and the Khunds, with several other villains lurking in the background. During this period, Karate Kid was spun off into a self-titled solo series, which lasted 15 issues. Levitz left the book, to be replaced full-time by Gerry Conway.

Superboy departed from the Legion due to a plot of a villain, and the book was renamed simply Legion of Super-Heroes starting with issue #259 (January 1980). Editor Jack C. Harris hired Steve Ditko as guest artist on several issues, a decision which garnered a mixed reaction from the title's readership. Jimmy Janes became the regular artist in The Exaggerated Death of Ultra Boy, a story arc where Ultra Boy disappears during a mission and journeys to reunite with the Legion. This story told the tale of the Legionnaire Reflecto (only glimpsed during the "Adult Legion" stories in Adventure Comics), featured villainy by the Time Trapper and Grimbor the Chainsman, and saw Superboy rejoin the team.

=== Paul Levitz era ===
Paul Levitz returned to write the series with #284. Pat Broderick and Bruce Patterson illustrated the title for a short time before Keith Giffen began on pencils, with Patterson, and then Larry Mahlstedt, on inks. The creative team received enhanced popularity following "The Great Darkness Saga", which ran from #287; #290–294; and Annual #3, featuring a full assault on the United Planets by Darkseid. Comics historian Les Daniels observed that "working with artist Keith Giffen, Levitz completed the transformation of Legion into a science-fiction saga of considerable scope and depth."

The Legion celebrated issue #300 (June 1983) by revisiting the "Adult Legion" storyline through a series of parallel world short stories illustrated by a number of popular Legion artists from previous years. The story freed Legion continuity from following the "Adult Legion" edict of previous issues.

Giffen's style changed abruptly a few issues later, to a darker and sketchier style inspired by Argentinian artist José Muñoz. A new Legion of Super-Heroes comic (the third publication under the title) was launched in August 1984. The existing Legion series, renamed Tales of the Legion of Super-Heroes with issue #314, continued running new material for a year, then began reprinting stories from the new Legion of Super-Heroes with issue #326. Tales continued publishing reprints until its final issue, #354 (December 1987).

The new series was launched in August 1984 with a five-part story featuring the Legion of Super-Villains. Giffen left in the middle of the story and was replaced by Steve Lightle, who stayed on the book for a year. The debut story arc saw the death of Karate Kid in issue #4 (November 1984). Levitz and Lightle co-created two Legionnaires, Tellus and Quislet, whose unusual appearances contrasted with the humanoid appearances of the other Legionnaires. Greg LaRocque began a lengthy run in #16 (November 1985), including a crossover with John Byrne's recently rebooted Superman titles in #37 and #38. The crossover was the first of several attempts by DC editors to explain the origins and fate of Superboy and his history with the Legion, following the revisions to the DC Universe caused by Crisis on Infinite Earths that removed Superman's career as Superboy from his history. In the crossover, the Legion's Superboy was revealed to originate from a pocket universe created by the Time Trapper. The crossover ended with Superboy's death. Levitz's run ended with the return of Giffen and a four-part story "The Magic Wars", concluding in #63 (August 1989).

=== "Five Years Later" ===
Giffen took over plotting as well as penciling with the Legion of Super-Heroes volume 4 title which started in November 1989, with scripts by Tom and Mary Bierbaum and assists by Al Gordon. Five years after the Magic Wars, the United Planets is a darker place and the Legion a distant memory. However, a group of former Legionnaires worked to re-form the Legion, in which Earth was ruled by the alien Dominators.

Shortly after this storyline began, the decision was made to retroactively remove Superboy completely from Legion history. Writer Mark Waid stated that "Because of inter-office politics and machinations...it was decided that there was no Superboy, but we weren't even allowed to reference him at all." This left the question of where the Legion's inspiration came from without the influence of Superboy. The writers' solution was a massive retcon, in which Mon-El served in the role of paragon instead of Superboy, with several more retcons to follow. Issue #5 featured an alternate universe story in which the restructuring took place, and the Time Trapper was replaced by his underling Glorith.

One major storyline during this period was the discovery of Batch SW6, clones of the Legion created by the Dominators. Keith Giffen's original conclusion for the storyline was that the clones would have been revealed to be the real Legion, and the ones whose adventures had been chronicled since the 1950s were the clones. The adult Legion's secret programming would kick in, forcing them to fight the younger Legion and leading to a fight to the death in which Legionnaires on both teams would die, with the victims’ names being picked at random out of a hat. Afterwards, the older team would explore the Vega System as a 30th-century version of the Omega Men in a new series while the younger team would act as the main Legion on Earth. Giffen's other conclusion was for several of the younger and older Legionnaires to die while liberating Earth from the Dominion. The older Legion would defend Earth while the younger Legion would act as the last line of defense for the United Planets as the Omega Men.

Instead, a parallel title, Legionnaires, was launched, starring the "SW6" Legion, whose origins were not resolved until the Zero Hour crossover by a different writing team. Legionnaires was lighter in tone than the main Legion book, and was written by the Bierbaums and drawn by Chris Sprouse. Giffen left the book after a storyline which involved the destruction of Earth, and the Bierbaums continued writing, overseeing the return of several classic characters. When the Bierbaums left, writer Tom McCraw took over and made a number of changes, such as forcing several Legion members underground, which required them to take on new identities and costumes, and bringing back long-absent Legionnaire Wildfire. In Zero Hour: Crisis in Time!, the DC Universe and the Legion's continuity are rebooted.

=== Post-Infinite Crisis (2007–2015) ===
Statues depicting the Legion in the "Lightning Saga" crossover. From Justice Society of America (vol. 3) #5 (2007). Art by Fernando Pasarin.

The "Lightning Saga" crossover in Justice League of America (vol. 2) #8–10 and Justice Society of America (vol. 3) #5–6 featured the return of the original versions of Star Boy (now called Starman), Dream Girl, Wildfire, Karate Kid, Timber Wolf, Sensor Girl, Dawnstar, and Brainiac 5. Though several differences between the original and Lightning Saga Legions exist, Geoff Johns stated that this incarnation of the Legion shares the same history as the original Legion up to the events of Crisis on Infinite Earths, with Clark Kent having joined the team as Superboy prior to the start of his career as Superman.

This version of the Legion next appeared in the "Superman and the Legion of Super-Heroes" storyline in Action Comics #858–863. In the year 3008, the Earth's sun has turned red and several failed Legion applicants who were born on Earth form the Justice League of Earth under the leadership of Earth-Man after he claims that Superman was a human who gained his powers from "Mother Earth". Earth-Man uses the claim to have Earth secede from the United Planets and ban all aliens from Earth, resulting in several Legionnaires going underground. With the help of Superman, the Legion restores the Sun to its normal state and defeats Earth-Man and the Justice League of Earth as the United Planets is about to attack the Earth.

This version of the Legion next appeared in the 2008 Final Crisis: Legion of 3 Worlds limited series, written by Geoff Johns and drawn by George Pérez. The mini-series features the post-Infinite Crisis Legion and Superman teaming up with the "Reboot" and "Threeboot" incarnations of the Legion to fight Superboy-Prime, the Legion of Super-Villains, and the Time Trapper. It was revealed in the mini-series that the "Reboot" Legion came from Earth-247 (a homage to the Legion's first appearance in Adventure Comics #247), which was destroyed in Infinite Crisis, and the "Threeboot" Legion came from the reconstructed Earth-Prime. Geoff Johns stated that the intent of the mini-series was to validate the existence of all three versions of the team while simultaneously restoring the pre-Crisis Legion's continuity as well. The incorporation of the three teams into mainstream DC continuity was shown in Action Comics #864 (June 2008). In the story, Batman recounts the JLA and JSA's battle alongside the original Legion to defeat Mordru, the "Reboot" team's assistance in destroying a Sun-Eater in the 20th century, and his own recent encounter with the "Threeboot" team.

This version of the Legion was featured in the second Adventure Comics series from September 2009 to October 2011, with the feature focusing on the Legion Academy from April 2011 onwards. This Legion played a part in the "Superman: Last Stand of New Krypton" storyline in 2010, where the ongoing continual events of "The Lightning Saga" concluded in its entirety. A new Legion of Super-Heroes ongoing series was published from May 2010 to August 2011, written by Paul Levitz and drawn by Yildiray Cinar, featuring the post-Infinite Crisis version of the team.

==== The New 52 (2011–2015) ====
Legion of Super-Heroes was relaunched in September 2011 with issue #1. Simultaneously, DC Comics cancelled Adventure Comics and replaced it with a new volume of Legion Lost. While Legion of Super-Heroes continued the adventures of the team from that title's previous volume, Legion Lost featured Wildfire, Dawnstar, Timber Wolf, Tyroc, Tellus, Gates, and Chameleon Girl stranded on 21st century Earth on a mission to save the future and are forced to remain there after contracting a pathogen that could destroy the 31st century if they returned. The Legion Lost series ended with the time-lost Legionnaires still stranded in the 21st century. This era of the Legion's publication concluded with issue #23 in August 2013 with the title's cancellation. In the final issue, the United Planets disbands the Legion after a cataclysmic battle with the Fatal Five, and the individual Legionnaires retire to their homeworlds or the Science Police. It is hinted that this iteration of the Legion exists on the New 52 version of Earth 2, with character dialogue suggesting the perseverance of the Legion in other times and realities. Writers Paul Levitz and Keith Giffen clarify that the Legion's placement on Earth-2 is just one possibility, with Giffen stating, "I think the ending is open to interpretation. The way I saw it was, it could be Earth 2. It might be Earth 1. It could be an Earth we've never seen before. It could be another universe."

The entire Legion was re-mobilized to battle Infinitus in the six issue "Infinitus Saga" in Justice League United written by Jeff Lemire (December 2014 – May 2015) which featured Brainiac 5 as leader, the return of the Legion Lost team to active Legion status and the inclusion of a number of Legionnaires from other continuities in the Legion's active ranks.

== See also ==
- Legion of Super-Heroes
- Legion of Super-Heroes (1994 team)
- Legion of Super-Heroes (2004 team)
- List of Legion of Super-Heroes members
- List of Legion of Super-Heroes publications
