= Superman and the Legion of Super-Heroes =

2007 comic book DC Comics story arc

- Cover of Action Comics #858 (late December 2007), art by Gary Frank.
- Publisher: DC Comics
- Publication date: Late December 2007 – May 2008
- Genre: Science fictionSuperhero
Title(s)
Action Comics #858–863
- Main character(s): Superman; Legion of Super-Heroes; Earth-Man; Justice League of Earth

Creative team
- Writer: Geoff Johns
- Penciller: Gary Frank
- Inker: Jonathan Sibal
- Letterer: Rob Leigh
- Colorist: Dave McCaig
- Editor(s): Nachie Castro; Matt Idelson
- Hardcover: ISBN 1-4012-1819-9
- Softcover: ISBN 1401219047

"Superman and the Legion of Super-Heroes" is a 2007 comic book DC Comics story arc written by Geoff Johns, illustrated by Gary Frank, which features the character Superman and the return of the pre-"Crisis on Infinite Earths" Legion of Super-Heroes. It ran in Action Comics #858–863 (late December 2007 – May 2008), this arc marked Geoff Johns' debut as a solo writer on Action, having previously written alongside Kurt Busiek and Richard Donner.

This story arc is the second part of DC's three-year reinvention of the Legion, taking place after the JLA/JSA "Lightning Saga" story arc, with the next and final part occurring in Final Crisis: Legion of 3 Worlds.

== Plot ==
During a civil war in the year 3008 that destroys an unnamed planet, a scientist and his wife send their baby aboard a spaceship to Earth, inspired by how Superman was spared from Krypton's destruction over a thousand years ago. After traveling through space, the spaceship reaches Earth and lands on the outskirts of Smallville in front of a farming couple. Instead of adopting the baby, the farmer takes out his rifle and kills it.

In the present day, Perry White discusses how Clark Kent needs to better his social life when he hears cries for help with his super-hearing. Finding a way out of the conversation, he changes into Superman and races to provide help. He finds a Brainiac robot attacking Metropolis, and after defeating the machine, the face opens to reveal a monitor with the face of Brainiac 5.

Brainiac 5 tells him that the Legion needs his assistance. Sending him to the 31st century, Superman finds that the Legion are now outlaws. Legionnaires Dawnstar, Colossal Boy, and Wildfire give him a Legion flight ring. The authorities then arrive and as Superman attempts to catch a shot meant for his friends, the shot instead goes through his hand. Fleeing with the Legion, they inform Superman that Earth's sun is now red, leaving him powerless. Superman asks what has happened, and Dawnstar explains that Legion rejects led by Earth-Man helped in dishonoring Superman's name by convincing Earth that he was human. In the process, Earth's people believe Superman's true origins to be a lie perpetrated by the Legion.

The Legion is being hunted by Earth-Man and his villainous cohorts, who have dubbed themselves the Justice League of Earth. After telling the Legionnaires that Brainiac 5 sent him here, Superman, Dawnstar, Colossal Boy, and Wildfire head to his likely location: an alien holding camp. Superman and the others encounter two more Legionnaires: Night Girl and Shadow Lass, who lead them to an improvised underground headquarters from which over ten thousand extraterrestrials have escaped to their home planets. Timber Wolf and Lightning Lass are revealed to be running the interstellar "underground railroad".

After a short reunion, Superman and his Legionnaire friends are discovered by Earth-Man and are attacked by the Justice League of Earth. Wildfire, Dawnstar, Colossal Boy, and Superman manage to escape through a warp-gate to Colu, where they crash land, and are attacked by the seemingly brainwashed residents. After blacking out, Superman awakens and is confronted by Brainiac 5, who reveals that his dictatorship of the planet is fabricated as a way to keep Colu, which is the strategic beachhead of a proposed United Planets attack on Earth, from completing their plans.

On Earth, Chameleon Girl sneaks into the Justice League's headquarters and discovers that they captured Sun Boy and used his abilities to tint the sun red. Superman, Brainiac 5, and Colossal Boy find the other Legionnaires and the crystal data tablet containing the false claims regarding Superman's origins.

Earth-Man reveals himself and steals Colossal Boy's power, and proceeds to attack Superman, gloating how he has forever ruined his name, but Superman takes the fight outside the station, and pushes Earth-Man into outer space. Meanwhile, the attack force of the United Planets wait for the signal to attack Earth.

Brainiac 5 manages to free Sun Boy from the machine. Once he returns to consciousness, Earth's sun once again emits yellow rays, restoring Superman's powers. The Man of Steel is then able to face Earth-Man on equal footing, convincing Earth's people the truth of his origins in the process. With the Legion's help, Superman subdues Earth-Man. With the Justice League of Earth defeated, the Legion set about rebuilding, and making plans to find their lost teammates. Before leaving for his era, Superman tells the Legion to let him know when they need his help. In the present, Superman returns to the spot where he made his first trip to the future, and places his hand on a tree Lightning Lad marked with an "L", to remind him where to wait for the Legion to return.

=== Epilogue ===
"Batman and the Legion of Super-Heroes", presented in Action Comics #864 (June 2008), serves as an epilogue to this story-arc (and as a prologue to Final Crisis: Legion of 3 Worlds). In this issue, Batman meets Superman and Lightning Lad at the Fortress of Solitude shortly after the latter's return from the 31st century. Batman expresses his distrust of the Legion, noting that he has encountered three versions of the team over the years. (Note: The Justice League of America and the Justice Society of America battled alongside the original Legion to defeat Mordru in Justice League of America #147–148 (September–October 1977). The post-Zero Hour team helped the heroes of 20th century Earth to destroy a Sun-Eater, as depicted in The Final Night #1–4 (November 1996 – February 1997). Batman encountered the "Threeboot" team in The Brave and the Bold vol. 3, #2–6 (June–October 2007).) He informs Superman that the bodies of Karate Kid and Duo Damsel have been discovered in Gotham City. (Note: Karate Kid died in Countdown to Final Crisis #7 (March 12, 2008), while one of Duo Damsel's bodies was killed in Countdown to Final Crisis #5 (March 26, 2008).) The trio is contacted by Starman, who has schizophrenia and resides in a sanitarium. (Note: Starman travelled back in time from the 31st century. Following an unintentional detour to the near future of Earth-22, he joined the Justice Society of America (Justice Society of America vol. 3, #1–2, January–February 2007).) He hints that Duo Damsel is still alive, but confirms that Karate Kid is dead, having died trying to discover a cure for his illness. He also notes that Dream Girl told him who dumped their bodies in Gotham City, but that he no longer remembers.

Before returning to the 31st century, Lightning Lad gives Superman a new flight ring that will bring him to the future in case of an emergency. The heroes are unaware that the Time Trapper has observed their exploits. Having failed in his attempts to erase Superman, the Trapper vows to corrupt everything that he stands for.

== Legacy ==
DC commissioned past artists of the Legion to create variant incentive covers for certain issues in this story. Steve Lightle, Mike Grell, and Keith Giffen contributed covers to three issues in a 1:10 ratio.

== Continuity questions ==
The Legion as presented in this story (as well as "the Lightning Saga" crossover in Justice League of America and Justice Society of America) shares the history of the original, pre-Crisis on Infinite Earths Legion. This version of the team is distinct from the one that was presented in Legion of Super-Heroes vol. 5; their appearance is a result of the Infinite Crisis and 52 limited series, and the revelation that there are 52 parallel universes in the DC Multiverse. This version of the Legion appears in Final Crisis: Legion of 3 Worlds alongside Superman and the "Reboot" and "Threeboot" versions of the team.

This team is revealed to be from the future of Earth-0 in Final Crisis: Legion of 3 Worlds #3.

== Collected editions ==
The story arc, excluding the epilogue in Action Comics #864, has been collected as Superman and the Legion of Super-Heroes (168 pages; hardcover: July 2008, ISBN 1-4012-1819-9; softcover: July 2009, ISBN 1-4012-1904-7).
