= List of Legion of Super-Heroes publications =

Legion of Super-Heroes publications are as follows, listed in approximate chronological order:

== Legion volumes ==
The Legion of Super-Heroes became a regular feature in Adventure Comics with issue #300, but were relegated to back-up feature beginning with issues #381. The Superboy comic book changed its title to Superboy starring the Legion of Super-Heroes with issue number #197. The name later underwent a slight change to Superboy and the Legion of Super-Heroes.

In 1973, a four issue limited series titled Legion of Super-Heroes published reprints of stories that originally appeared in Adventure Comics and Action Comics. From a publishing standpoint, the limited series is Legion of Super-Heroes Volume 1.

Beginning with issue #259, Superboy and the Legion of Super-Heroes changed its title, dropping the "Superboy" and becoming simply Legion of Super-Heroes. This generally is considered Legion of Super-Heroes Volume 2.

In 1984, DC Comics began publishing first-run titles in a new, advanced printing format on heavier paper (with a concomitant price increase). The company launched a new title, Legion of Super-Heroes, in the high-resolution format, beginning with issue #1 in August 1984. This became known as Legion of Super-Heroes Volume 3. The original comic book continued publication, however, changing its name to Tales of the Legion of Super-Heroes with issue #314. Tales of the Legion of Super-Heroes is considered a continuation of Volume 2. It ceased publication in December 1989. During the latter part of its run, Legion of Super-Heroes Volume 3 ran several story lines which retconned the team's history in order to deal with changes in the DC Comics universe wrought by the 1985–1986 crossover known as Crisis on Infinite Earths. These changes removed Superboy (as previously known) from DC Comics. Because the Legion's history was so interwoven with Superboy, a "pocket universe" Superboy was created by the Legion villain Time Trapper. The latter part of Volume 3 is thus known as the "pocket universe Legion". Legion of Super-Heroes Volume 3 ceased publication with issue #63.

A new book, Legion of Super-Heroes, began publication in November 1989. This is generally known as Volume 4. Set five years after the events of Volume 3, this publication covers what is known as the "Five Years Later" Legion. In 1994, the superhero team's continuity came to an end with Legion of Super-Heroes Volume 4, #61, after the DC Comics crossover story Zero Hour: Crisis in Time. Beginning with issue #62, the publication covered stories regarding what is known as the "Reboot Legion". Legion of Super-Heroes Volume 4 ceased in March 2000. Part of the superhero team's exploits were continued in the new comic book The Legion, which began publication in December 2001 and ceased in October 2004. Another part of the team's adventures were covered in a limited series comic, Legion Lost, which began publication in May 2000 and ceased in April 2001. Neither publication is considered to be part of Legion of Super-Heroes Volume 4 or Volume 5.

Yet another new publication, Legion of Super-Heroes, began in February 2005. With the team's origins retconned yet again, this is known as the period of the "Threeboot Legion". Due to the events of the DC Comics crossover story Infinite Crisis in 2005, Supergirl travels to the 30th century for an extended period. Beginning with issue #16, the publication changed its title to Supergirl and the Legion of Super-Heroes. This is considered a continuation of Legion of Super-Heroes Volume 5. The publication returned to its original title with issue #37. Volume 5 ceased publication with issue #50 during the events of yet another DC Comics universe-wide event, known as Final Crisis (published from July 2008 to March 2009).

A new comic book, Legion of Super-Heroes, began publication in July 2010. This is generally known as Volume 6, and restores (mostly) the continuity of the 1958-to-1994 Legion team—generally called the "Retroboot Legion". This publication ceased in October 2011 after yet another DC Comics universe-wide reboot known as Flashpoint (published from May to September 2011).

A new publication to bear the title Legion of Super-Heroes was first issued in November 2011. This is generally known as Volume 7, and was part of DC Comics' "soft reboot" known as "The New 52". It largely maintained the continuity of Volume 6. This publication ceased in October 2013.

The most recent incarnation of the Legion of Superheroes began with a 2 issue special series titled "Legion of Superheroes Millennium Edition" which introduced a new run of "Legion of Superheroes" which started monthly in November 2019 and is expected to last for 12 months.

== Original continuity ==
- Adventure Comics #247, 267, 282, 290, 293, 300–380
- Action Comics #267, 276, 287, 289, 377–392, 591
- Superboy #86, 89, 98, 117, 147, 172, 173, 176, 183, 184, 188, 190, 191, 193, 195
- Superman (Volume 1) #147
- Superman's Pal Jimmy Olsen #72, 76, 106
- Superman's Girl Friend, Lois Lane #50
- Legion of Super-Heroes (vol. 1) #1–4 (reprints)
- Superboy and the Legion of Super-Heroes #197–258
- Karate Kid #1–15
- DC Special #28
- Justice League of America #147, 148
- DC Super Stars #17
- All-New Collectors' Edition #C-55 (Superboy and the Legion of Super-Heroes tabloid)
- Kamandi #58
- DC Comics Presents #13, 43, 59, 80
- Legion of Super-Heroes (vol. 2) #259–313, Annual #1–3
- DC Special Series #21
- Best of Blue Ribbon Digest #24 (New Story, appears between #287 and #288 of Legion of Super-Heroes (vol. 2))
- Secrets of the Legion of Super-Heroes #1–3
- Superman Family #207
- The Brave and the Bold #179, 198
- Tales of the Legion of Super-Heroes #314–325 (#326–354 are reprints of Legion of Super-Heroes (vol. 3))
- World's Finest Comics #284
- Legion of Super-Heroes (vol. 3) #1–63, Annual #1–4 (Baxter series)
- Legion of Substitute Heroes Special #1
- Legionnaires 3 #1–4
- Booster Gold #8, 9
- Secret Origins #8, 25, 37, 42, 46, 47
- Cosmic Boy #1–4
- Superman (vol. 2) #8
- Action Comics #591
- Who's Who in the Legion of Super-Heroes #1–7

Legion members appearing during "Absolute Power":

- Superman/Batman #14–18 (Note: Superman/Batman #14–18 is a time travel series and not tied directly to any Legion continuity.)

== 5 Years Later (includes original and Batch SW6 teams) ==
- Legion of Super-Heroes (vol. 4) #1–61, Annual #1–5
- Legionnaires #1–18
- Legionnaires Annual #1 (Note: This is an "Elseworlds" story, which is not part of Legion continuity.)
- L.E.G.I.O.N. 94 #69
- Timber Wolf #1–5
- Valor #1–23

== Post-Zero Hour ==
- Legion of Super-Heroes (vol. 4) #0, 62–125, 1000000, Annual #6–7
- Legionnaires #0, 19–81, 1000000, Annual #2–3
- Legends of the Legion #1–4
- Legion Science Police #1–4
- Superman Plus the Legion of Super-Heroes #1
- Sovereign Seven Plus the Legion of Super-Heroes #1
- Superboy (vol. 3) #21, #45
- Adventures of Superman #540
- Showcase '95 #6
- Genesis #1-4
- The Final Night #1–4
- Inferno #1–4
- Unlimited Access #1-2
- Action Comics #741
- Superman (vol. 2) #119
- Impulse #21
- Green Lantern (vol. 3) #98-99
- Showcase '96 #8 #10–12
- Adventure Comics 80 pages Special #1
- Legion Lost #1–12
- Legion Worlds #1–6
- The Legion #1–38
- Legion of Super-Heroes Secret Files #1-2
- The Legion Secret Files 3003
- Teen Titans (vol. 3) #15–16
- Titans/Legion of Super-Heroes: Universe Ablaze #1–4
- Teen Titans/Legion Special #1
- Infinite Crisis #6
- Final Crisis: Legion of 3 Worlds #1–5
- Young Justice: Our Worlds At War #1

== Threeboot continuity ==
- Teen Titans/Legion Special #1
- Legion of Super-Heroes (vol. 5) #1–15
- Supergirl and the Legion of Super-Heroes #16–36
- Action Comics #850
- Legion of Super-Heroes (vol. 5) #37–50
- The Brave and the Bold (vol. 2) #4–6
- Final Crisis: Legion of 3 Worlds #1–5

== Post-Infinite Crisis "Retroboot" team ==
- Justice League of America (vol. 2) #8–10
- Justice Society of America (vol. 3) #5–6
- Action Comics #858–864
- Countdown #50–48, 45, 42–41, 39–37, 35–34, 31–27 (descending numerical order)
- Countdown to Final Crisis #26–23, 21–20, 15–13, 11–6 (descending numerical order)
- Supergirl (vol. 5) #21–22, 51-52, (Note: Part of the crossover Last Stand of New Krypton) Annual #2
- Superman (vol. 1) #698-699
- Superman: Last Stand of New Krypton #1-3
- Adventure Comics Special Featuring Guardian
- Final Crisis: Legion of 3 Worlds #1–5
- Adventure Comics (vol. 2) #1–12 (series moved to vol. 1, starting with #516)
- Adventure Comics (vol. 1) #516–529
- Legion of Super-Heroes (vol. 6) #1–16
- Legion of Super-Villains #1
- Legion of Super-Heroes (vol. 7) #1–23, 0
- Legion Lost (vol. 2) #1–16, 0
- Teen Titans (vol. 4) #9, Annual #1 (Note: Part of the crossover The Culling)
- Superboy (vol. 6) #9
- Legion: Secret Origin #1–6
- Star Trek / Legion of Super-Heroes #1–6
- Justice League United, Annual #1 #6–10
- Convergence: Superboy and the Legion of Super-Heroes #1-2

New 52 Adult Legion: (Note: The Adult Legion is a possible future for the Legion and is not considered canon, nor is it tied to any specific continuity)

- Action Comics (vol. 2) #5-6, 16-18

== Post-Rebirth team ==
- Superman (vol. 5) #9 (cameo),14-16
- Event Leviathan #3 (cameo)
- Supergirl (vol. 7) #33
- Legion of Super-Heroes: Millennium #1-2
- Justice League (vol. 4) #34 (cameo)
- Legion of Super-Heroes (vol. 8) #1-12
- Doomsday Clock #12 (cameo)
- The Flash #750 (cameo)
- DC: The Doomed and the Damned #1 (flashback)
- Future State: Legion of Super-Heroes #1-2
- Future State: Immortal Wonder Woman #2 (flashback)
- Infinite Frontier #0 (cameo)
- Tis the Season to Be Freezin' #1 (cameo)
- Justice League vs. Legion of Super-Heroes #1-6
- DC Pride 2022 #1 (cameo)
- Green Arrow (vol. 7) #3-4

== Other comic books ==
- Adventures in the DC Universe #10
- Legion of Super Heroes in the 31st Century #1–20

== Collected editions ==
| Title | Material collected | Publication date | ISBN |
Original
| Showcase Presents: Legion of Super-Heroes, Vol. 1 | Adventure Comics #247, 267, 282, 290, 293, 300–321, Action Comics #267, 276, 287, 289, Superboy #86, 89, 98, Superman #147, Annual #4, Superman's Pal Jimmy Olsen #72, 76 | April 4, 2007 | 9781401213824 |
| Showcase Presents: Legion of Super-Heroes, Vol. 2 | Adventure Comics #322–348, Superboy #117, 125 | April 22, 2008 | 9781401217242 |
| Showcase Presents: Legion of Super-Heroes, Vol. 3 | Adventure Comics #349–368, Superman's Pal Jimmy Olsen #106 | April 28, 2009 | 9781401221850 |
| Showcase Presents: Legion of Super-Heroes, Vol. 4 | Adventure Comics #369–380, Action Comics #378–387, 389–392, Superboy #172–173, 176, 183–184, 188, 190–191 | September 22, 2010 | 9781401229412 |
| Showcase Presents: Legion of Super-Heroes, Vol. 5 | Superboy #193, 195, 197–220, Karate Kid #1 | December 30, 2014 | 9781401242978 |
| Legion of Super-Heroes Archives, Vol. 1 | Adventure Comics #247, 267, 282, 290, 293, 300–305, Action Comics #267, 276, 287, 289, Superboy #86, 89, 98, Superman #147, Annual #4 | 1991 | 1563890208 |
| Legion of Super-Heroes Archives, Vol. 2 | Adventure Comics #306–317, Superman's Pal Jimmy Olsen #72 | 1992 | 1563890577 |
| Legion of Super-Heroes Archives, Vol. 3 | Adventure Comics #318–328, Superman's Pal Jimmy Olsen #76, Superboy #117 | 1993 | 1563891026 |
| Legion of Super-Heroes Archives, Vol. 4 | Adventure Comics #329–339, Superboy #124–125 | 1994 | 1563891239 |
| Legion of Super-Heroes Archives, Vol. 5 | Adventure Comics #340–349 | 1995 | 1563891549 |
| Legion of Super-Heroes Archives, Vol. 6 | Adventure Comics #350–358 | November 1996 | 1563892774 |
| Legion of Super-Heroes Archives, Vol. 7 | Adventure Comics #359–367, Superman's Pal Jimmy Olsen #106 | October 1997 | 1563893983 |
| Legion of Super-Heroes Archives, Vol. 8 | Adventure Comics #368–376, Superboy #147 | October 1998 | 1563894300 |
| Legion of Super-Heroes Archives, Vol. 9 | Adventure Comics #377–380, Action Comics #378–387, 389–392 | November 1, 1999 | 1563895145 |
| Legion of Super-Heroes Archives, Vol. 10 | Superboy #172–173, 176, 183–184, 188, 190–191, 193, 195, Superboy starring the Legion of Super Heroes #197–202, Adventure Comics #403 | October 1, 2000 | 1563896281 |
| Legion of Super-Heroes Archives, Vol. 11 | Superboy starring the Legion of Super Heroes #203–212 and material from Amazing World of DC Comics #9 | August 1, 2001 | 156389730X |
| Legion of Super-Heroes Archives, Vol. 12 | Superboy starring the Legion of Super Heroes #213–221, Superboy and the Legion of Super Heroes #222-223, Karate Kid #1 | May 1, 2003 | 1563899612 |
| Legion of Super-Heroes Archives, Vol. 13 | Superboy and the Legion of Super Heroes #224–233 | May 15, 2012 | 1401234399 |
| Legion of Super Heroes: The Silver Age Omnibus, vol. 1 | Adventure Comics #247, 267, 82, 290, 293, 300–328, Action Comics #267, 276, 287, 289, Superman #147, Annual #4, Superman's Pal Jimmy Olsen #72, 76, Superboy #86, 89, 98, 117 | August 8, 2017 | 1401271022 |
| Legion of Super Heroes: The Silver Age Omnibus, vol. 2 | Adventure Comics #329–360, Superboy #124–125 | June 26, 2018 | 1401280552 |
| Legion of Super Heroes: The Silver Age Omnibus, vol. 3 | Adventure Comics #361-380, Action Comics #378-392, Superboy #147, Superman's Pal Jimmy Olsen #106 | June 3, 2020 | 9781779502438 |
| Legion of Super Heroes: The Silver Age Vol. 1 | Adventure Comics #247, 267, 282, 290, 293, 300-310, Action Comics #267, 276, 287, 289, Superboy #86, 89, 98, Superman #147 | August 28, 2018 | 978-1401281571 |
| Superboy and the Legion of Super-Heroes Vol. 1 | Superboy and the Legion of Super-Heroes #234–237, 238 (cover only), 239-240, All-New Collectors’ Edition #C-55, DC Superstars #17 | June 27, 2017 | 9781401272913 |
| Superboy and the Legion of Super-Heroes Vol. 2 | Superboy and the Legion of Super-Heroes #241–258, Legion of Super Heroes (vol. 2) #259, DC Comics Presents #13-14 | July 17, 2018 | 9781401280857 |
| The Steve Ditko Omnibus vol. 2 | Legion of Super-Heroes (vol. 2) #267, 268, 274, 276, 281 and Showcase #75, The Hawk and The Dove #1-2, Man-Bat #1, Detective Comics #483-485, 487, Adventure Comics #467-468, Outsiders #13, Legends of the DC Universe 80 Page Giant #1, Tales of the New Gods | Jan 11, 2012 | 1401232353 |
| DC Comics Classics Library: The Legion of Super-Heroes: The Life and Death of Ferro Lad | Adventure Comics #346, 347, 352–355, 357 | March 2009 | 9781401221935 |
| DC Finest: The Legion of Super-Heroes: Zap Goes the Legion | Action Comics #378–387, 389–392; Adventure Comics #374–380, 403; Superboy #172–173, 176, 183–184, 188, 190–191, 193, 195, 197–203 | December 2024 | 9781779528490 |
| Legion of Super-Heroes: Before the Darkness Vol. 1 | Legion of Super-Heroes (vol. 2) #260-271, Secrets of the Legion of Super-Heroes #1-3 | February, 2021 | 9781779507594 |
| Legion of Super-Heroes: Before the Darkness Vol. 2 | Legion of Super-Heroes (vol. 2) #272-283, Best of DC: Blue Ribbon Digest #24, DC Special Series #21 | January, 2022 | 9781779510778 |
| Legion of Super-Heroes: The Great Darkness Saga | Legion of Super-Heroes (vol. 2) #287, 290–294, Annual #3 | 1989 | 9780930289430 |
| Legion of Super-Heroes: The Great Darkness Saga Deluxe Edition | Legion of Super-Heroes (vol. 2) #284–296, Annual #1 | November 17, 2010 | 9781401229610 |
| Legion of Super-Heroes: The Curse Deluxe Edition | Legion of Super-Heroes (vol. 2) #297–313, Annual #2–3 | September 2011 | 9781401230982 |
| Legion of Super-Heroes: An Eye for an Eye | Legion of Super-Heroes (vol. 3) #1–6 | December 5, 2007 | 9781401215699 |
| Legion of Super-Heroes: The More Things Change | Legion of Super-Heroes (vol. 3) #7–13 | December 16, 2008 | 9781401219444 |
| Superman: The Man of Steel Vol. 4 | Legion of Super-Heroes (vol. 3) #37–38 and Adventures of Superman #430–431, Action Comics #590–59, Superman (vol. 2) #7–8, | September 1, 2005 | 9781401204556 |
Five Years Later Era
| Legion of Super-Heroes: Five Years Later Omnibus Vol. 1 | Legion of Super-Heroes (vol. 4) #1–39; Legion of Super-Heroes Annual #1-3, Who's Who #1-11, 13, 14, 16, Timber Wolf #1-5 | August 18, 2020 | 9781779503138 |
| Legion of Super-Heroes: Five Years Later Omnibus Vol. 2 | Legion of Super-Heroes (vol. 4) #40-61, Annual #4-5, Legionnaires #1-18, Annual #1 Who's Who Update 93 #1, L.E.G.I.O.N. #69-70, Valor #20-23 | April 12, 2022 | 9781779515575 |
Zero Hour Era
| Legion of Super-Heroes: The Beginning of Tomorrow | Legion of Super-Heroes (vol. 4) #0, 62–65, Legionnaires #0, 19–22 | September 1, 1999 | 9781563895159 |
| Legionnaires Book One | Legion of Super-Heroes (vol. 4) #0, 62–68, Legionnaires #0, 19–24 | April 27, 2017 | 978-1401268664 |
| Legionnaires Book Two | Legion of Super-Heroes (vol. 4) #69–73; Annual #6, Legionnaires #25–30; Annual #2; Showcase '95 #6 | May 29, 2018 | 978-1401273811 |
| The Legion by Dan Abnett and Andy Lanning Vol. 1 | Legion of Super-Heroes (vol. 4) #122–125, Legionaries #78–81, Legion of Super-Heroes Secret Files #2. | September 26, 2017 | 978-1401276362 |
| The Legion by Dan Abnett and Andy Lanning Vol. 2 | Legion Lost #1–12 | June 2018 | 978-1401280406 |
| The Legion: Foundations | The Legion #25–30, Legion of Super-Heroes Secret Files #3 | September 1, 2004 | 9781401203382 |
Infinite Crisis Era
| Legion of Super-Heroes Vol. 1: Teenage Revolution | Legion of Super-Heroes (vol. 5) #1–6 and material from Teen Titans/Legion Special #1 | December 1, 2005 | 9781401204822 |
| Legion of Super-Heroes Vol. 2: Death of a Dream | Legion of Super-Heroes (vol. 5) #7–13 | May 1, 2006 | 9781401209711 |
| Supergirl and the Legion of Super-Heroes Vol. 3: Strange Visitor from Another Century | Legion of Super-Heroes (vol. 5) #14–15, Supergirl and the Legion of Super-Heroes #16–19 | October 25, 2006 | 9781401209162 |
| Supergirl and the Legion of Super-Heroes Vol. 4: Adult Education | Supergirl and the Legion of Super-Heroes #20–25 | April 7, 2007 | 9781401212445 |
| Supergirl and the Legion of Super-Heroes Vol. 5: The Dominator War | Supergirl and the Legion of Super-Heroes #26–30 | September 5, 2007 | 9781401214425 |
| Supergirl and the Legion of Super-Heroes: The Quest for Cosmic Boy | Supergirl and the Legion of Super-Heroes #31–36 | April 15, 2008 | 9781401216955 |
| Legion of Super-Heroes: Enemy Rising | Legion of Super-Heroes (vol. 5) #37–44 | October 28, 2008 | 9781401219932 |
| Legion of Super-Heroes: Enemy Manifest | Legion of Super-Heroes (vol. 5) #45–50 | May 19, 2009 | 9781401223045 |
Post-Infinite Crisis
| Justice League of America, Vol. 2: The Lightning Saga | Justice League of America (vol. 2) #0, 8–12, Justice Society of America vol. 3, #5–6 | February 13, 2008 | 9781401216528 |
| Superman and the Legion of Super-Heroes | Action Comics #858–863 | July 22, 2008 | 9781401218195 |
| Final Crisis: Legion of 3 Worlds | Final Crisis: Legion of 3 Worlds #1–5 | October 27, 2009 | 9781401223243 |
| Superboy and the Legion of Super-Heroes: The Early Years | Adventure Comics #515–520 | May 24, 2011 | 9781401231682 |
| Legion of Super-Heroes Vol. 1: The Choice | Legion of Super-Heroes (vol. 6) #1–6 | April 20, 2011 | 9781401230395 |
| Legion of Super-Heroes Vol. 2: Consequences | Legion of Super-Heroes (vol. 6) #7–10, Adventure Comics #521–522, Legion of Super-Heroes Annual #1 | September 7, 2011 | 9781401232382 |
| Legion of Super-Heroes Vol. 3: When Evil Calls | Legion of Super-Heroes (vol. 6) #11–16, Adventure Comics #523–529, Legion of Super-Villains #1 | April 11, 2012 | 9781401233679 |
| Legion: Secret Origin | Legion: Secret Origin #1-6 | October 30, 2012 | 978-1401237301 |
The New 52
| Legion of Super-Heroes Vol. 1: Hostile World | Legion of Super-Heroes (vol. 7) #1–7 | July 3, 2012 | 9781401235017 |
| Legion of Super-Heroes Vol. 2: The Dominators | Legion of Super-Heroes (vol. 7) #0, 8–14 | May 8, 2013 | 9781401240974 |
| Legion of Super-Heroes Vol. 3: The Fatal Five | Legion of Super-Heroes (vol. 7) #15–23 | February 18, 2014 | 9781401243326 |
| Legion Lost Vol. 1: Run From Tomorrow | Legion Lost (vol. 2) #1–7 | September 3, 2012 | 9781401237035 |
| Legion Lost Vol. 2: The Culling | Legion Lost (vol. 2) #0, 8–16 | September 3, 2013 | 9781401240257 |
| The Culling: Rise of the Ravagers | Legion Lost (vol. 2) #8-9, Teen Titans (vol. 4) #8-9, Annual #1, Superboy (vol. 6) #8-9 | January 29, 2013 | 9781401237998 |
| Convergence: Crisis: Book One | Convergence: Superboy and the Legion of Super-Heroes #1-2 and Convergence: Batman and The Outsiders #1-2, Convergence: The Adventures of Superman #1-2, Convergence: Green Lantern Corps #1-2, Convergence: Hawkman #1-2 | October 20, 2015 | 978-1401258085 |
Post-Rebirth
| Legion of Super-Heroes Vol. 1: Millennium | Legion of Super-Heroes: Millennium #1-2, Legion of Super-Heroes (vol. 8) #1-6 | October 6, 2020 | 9781401295776 |
| Legion of Super-Heroes Vol. 2: Trial of the Legion | Legion of Super-Heroes (vol. 8) #7-12 | April 13, 2021 | 9781779505637 |
| Future State: Superman | Future State: Legion of Super-Heroes #1-2 and Future State: Superman of Metropolis #1-2, Future State: Superman: Worlds of War #1-2, Future State: Superman vs. Imperious Lex #1-3, Future State: Kara Zor-El, Superwoman #1-2, Future State: Superman: House of El #1 | June 29, 2021 | 978-1779510686 |
| Justice League vs. The Legion of Super-Heroes | Justice League vs. Legion of Super-Heroes #1-6 | December 13, 2022 | 978-1779517418 |
Other
| Legion of Super-Heroes: 1,050 Years of the Future | Adventure Comics #247, 304, 312, 354–355, Superboy #212, Legion of Super-Heroes (vol. 2) #300, Legion of Super-Heroes (vol. 4) #0, Legends of the DCU 80-Page Giant #2, The Legion #3 and material from Limited Collectors' Edition #C-49, All-New Collectors' Edition #C-55, History of the DC Universe Portfolio | June 17, 2008 | 9781401217914 |
| Star Trek / Legion of Super-Heroes | Star Trek / Legion of Super-Heroes #1-6 | July 17, 2012 | 978-1613772300 |
| DC Meets Looney Tunes | Legion of Super-Heroes/Bugs Bunny Special #1 and Martian Manhunter/Marvin the Martian Special #1, Batman/Elmer Fudd Special #1, Jonah Hex/Yosemite Sam Special #1, Wonder Woman/Tasmanian Devil Special #1, Lobo/Roadrunner Special #1 | February 2018 | 978-1401277574 |

== See also ==
- List of Legion of Super-Heroes members
