= Spider Girl =

DC Comics character, created 1963

- Spider Girl as depicted in Legionnaires #21 (January 1995). Art by Jeff Moy.

Publication information
- Publisher: DC Comics
- First appearance: Adventure Comics #323 (July 1964)
- Created by: Jim Tilley; Jerry Siegel; John Forte

In-story information
- Alter ego: Sussa Paka
- Species: Metahuman
- Place of origin: Earth (31st century)
- Team affiliations: Workforce; Legion of Super-Villains; Legion of Super-Heroes; Justice League of Earth
- Notable aliases: Wave
- Abilities: Super-strong prehensile hair

Spider Girl (Sussa Paka) is a supervillain appearing in American comic books published by DC Comics. The character was first mentioned, in 1963, as a concept in the letters page of Adventure Comics when Jim Tilley, a fan from Rockaway, New York, submitted the idea of Spider Lass, a character with the power of super-strong prehensile hair. Spider Girl debuted in Adventure Comics #323 (July 1964), a year later.

== Fictional character biography ==
Spider Girl is initially introduced as a failed Legion of Super-Heroes applicant who possesses prehensile hair, which she can use to strangle others like a spider web. She gained her powers after being subjected to mutagenic experiments that were intended to help her protect the planet Taltar and expand its influence in the United Planets. Spider Girl is rejected from the Legion after losing control of her powers, causing her to nearly strangle Brainiac 5 and Phantom Girl. Spider Girl goes on to join Tarik the Mute's underground academy for supervillains and the Legion of Super-Villains.

During the Five-Year Gap run in Legion of Super-Heroes (vol. 4) (1989), Sussa Paka is depicted as a reformed thief with a crush on Legionnaire Ultra Boy. She joins the adult Legion as Spider Girl, but when the team is outlawed by the United Planets, they go underground, changing their appearances and codenames. Shortly before Zero Hour: Crisis in Time!, which rebooted the Legion's continuity, Spider Girl changes her codename to Wave and dyes her hair blue. Following Zero Hour, Spider Girl is reintroduced in the fourth volume of Legion of Super-Heroes as a member of Workforce.

The original version of Spider Girl appears in the Superman and the Legion of Super-Heroes storyline beginning in Action Comics #858. In this version, she is a member of the Justice League of Earth, a group of Earth-born Legion rejects who have seized control of Earth and banished the Legion and other extraterrestrials.

== Powers and abilities ==
In both incarnations, Spider Girl possesses prehensile hair. She can use her hair to ensnare or bind her opponents, resembling a spider's web.

== In other media ==
Sussa Paka as Wave makes non-speaking appearances in Legion of Super Heroes as a member of the Legion of Super-Villains.
