= Justice League of Earth =

Fictional characters

Publication information
- Publisher: DC Comics
- First appearance: Action Comics #859 (January 2008)
- Created by: Geoff Johns, Gary Frank

In-story information
- Base(s): Metropolis, Earth
- Member(s): Earth-Man; Golden Boy; Radiation Roy; Spider Girl; Storm Boy; Tusker

The Justice League of Earth are fictional characters, a supervillain team of the 31st century in the DC Comics universe. They were created by Geoff Johns and Gary Frank and first appeared in Action Comics #859 (January 2008) as enemies of the Legion of Super-Heroes.

== Fictional team history ==
The Justice League of Earth is a group of super-powered humans living on 31st-century Earth. They all audition for the Legion of Super-Heroes, but are rejected due to their powers being judged to be ineffective in battle. It is later revealed that they were rejected due to possessing deep-rooted psychosis issues that would have made them potential threats. The rejects fall under the sway of Earth-Man and his xenophobic claims that Superman is a native of Earth who worked hard to protect the planet from alien threats.

The Justice League of Earth spread their ideals of distrust and hatred against aliens across Earth and were able to successfully convince the planet's inhabitants into believing them, resulting in the planet falling under the dictatorship of Earth-Man, seceding from the United Planets, and a massive persecution of aliens among Earth's people. The Legion of Super-Heroes are branded as fugitives for perpetuating the "lies" of Superman's true origins, with the Justice League of Earth being tasked with hunting them down. The Justice League of Earth capture many Legion members, allowing Earth-Man to absorb their powers. Wildfire, Dawnstar, Colossal Boy, and Superman escape through a warp-gate to Colu, where they crash land, and are attacked by the seemingly brainwashed residents. After blacking out, Superman awakens and is confronted by Brainiac 5, who reveals that his dictatorship of the planet is fabricated as a way to keep Colu, which is the strategic beachhead of a proposed United Planets attack on Earth, from completing their plans.

Earth-Man reveals himself, steals Colossal Boy's power, and attacks Superman, gloating about how he has ruined Superman's name. Superman takes the fight outside the station and pushes Earth-Man into outer space. Meanwhile, the attack force of the United Planets waits for the signal to attack Earth.

Superman faces Earth-Man, convincing Earth's people of the truth of his origins in the process. With the Legion's help, Superman is able to subdue Earth-Man. With the Justice League of Earth defeated, the Legion set about rebuilding and making plans to find their lost teammates. Before leaving for his era, Superman tells the Legion to let him know when they need his help. The Justice League of Earth are imprisoned on the prison planet Takron-Galtos.

In Final Crisis, Earth Man, Golden Boy, Storm Boy, and Tusker join Superboy-Prime's Legion of Super-Villains.

== Members ==
- Earth Man (Kirt Niedrigh) - He can absorb and duplicate the abilities of others.
- Golden Boy (Klint Stewirt) - He can change the structure of any element into gold via contact.
- Radiation Roy (Roy Travich) - He emits radiation.
- Spider Girl (Sussa Paka) - She has super-strong prehensile hair.
- Storm Boy (Myke Chypurz) - He can control the weather.
- Tusker (Horace Lafeaugh) - He has ivory-like tusks that can grow to certain sizes as well as enhanced durability, a healing factor, and enhanced strength, agility, and reflexes.
