= Kirt Niedrigh =

DC Comics character

- Earth-Man and the Justice League of Earth as depicted in Action Comics #860 (February 2008). Art by Gary Frank.

Publication information
- Publisher: DC Comics
- First appearance: As Absorbancy Boy: Superboy and the Legion of Super-Heroes #218 (July 1976); As Earth-Man: Action Comics #858 (December 2007)
- Created by: Original concept: Cary Bates; Mike Grell; Supervillain reinvention: Geoff Johns; Gary Frank

In-story information
- Species: Metahuman
- Place of origin: Earth (31st century)
- Team affiliations: Justice League of Earth; Legion of Super-Villains; Green Lantern Corps; Legion of Super-Heroes
- Notable aliases: Absorbancy Boy, Zoraz, Earth-Man
- Abilities: Super-power absorption and duplication Legion Flight Ring; Power ring allows flight, superhuman strength, and hard-light constructs with use of power ring.

Kirt Niedrigh is a fictional character, a semi-reformed supervillain, and former antihero in the DC Comics Universe. Created by Cary Bates and Mike Grell, Niedrigh is a former hopeful for the Legion of Super-Heroes under the guise of Absorbancy Boy. After being rejected from the team, years later he resurfaced as Earth-Man leading a group of supervillains calling themselves the "Justice League of Earth", which help to enforce a xenophobic agenda that Earth has adopted. He first appears in Superboy and the Legion of Super-Heroes #218 (July 1976), and reappeared as Earth-Man in Action Comics #858 (December 2007), the first part of the "Superman and the Legion of Super-Heroes" story arc.

== Fictional character biography ==
=== Absorbancy Boy ===
As a teenager, Kirt Niedrigh applies for membership in the Legion of Super-Heroes. Niedrigh is able to replicate superpowers by absorbing the energy residue of any super-powered being. However, he is rejected on the grounds that his powers were too limited. In the rebooted continuity of New Earth, Niedrigh's rejection is further elaborated upon, explaining that while his powers had the potential to develop in time, Saturn Girl had analyzed his mind, finding a deep streak of antisocial and evil tendencies that Niedrigh was unwilling to keep in check.

Incensed at his rejection, Niedrigh finds the costume of Zoraz, a fake villain used as a final test for new Legionnaires. Niedrigh used the suit's residual energies to project red sun radiation, then absorbs Superboy's powers. Niedrigh is defeated by Legion applicant Tyroc, who is inducted into the Legion.

=== Earth-Man ===
Niedrigh resurfaces in the 2007–2008 storyline "Superman and the Legion of Super-Heroes". Now calling himself Earth-Man, he claims that Superman was not an alien, but a human who was granted powers by Mother Earth to protect Earth from alien invaders. Using this knowledge, Earth-Man sows distrust and hatred of aliens among the people of Earth, resulting in aliens being violently captured and deported. Earth-Man captures many Legion members, absorbing their powers for his own, and exploits the powers of Sun Boy to turn many stars in the galaxy red.

Earth-Man personally takes on Superman, almost defeating him until Brainiac 5 frees Sun Boy. With Earth's sun once again yellow, Superman is able to fight Earth-Man on equal terms. The return of Superman's powers, coupled with Earth-Man's indiscriminate attacks, convince the people of Metropolis that they had been lied to. Earth-Man and the JLE are imprisoned on Takron-Galtos.

The Earth government, eager to mollify Earth-Man's pro-human supporters, forces the Legion to offer him membership in return for allowing the Legion to remain on Earth. While considering their offer, Earth-Man is offered a Green Lantern ring by Dyogene. Earth-Man accepts the Legion's offer, but secretly uses his Lantern ring to deactivate the failsafe that Brainiac 5 placed to keep his power in check.

Earth-Man reveals the ring to the Legion, and is taken by it to the planet Xerifos, which the ring has its inhabitants are in need of help. Upon arrival, Earth-Man is attacked by the planet's native creatures, which the ring will not let him attack, as they are sentient. Earth-Man discards the ring, declaring that he will not be led around by it, and returns to Earth with the Legion.

A short while afterward, Earth-Man discovers that Brainiac 5 had altered his flight ring to increase his sense of morality. Bringing Brainiac 5 the wrecked ring, Earth-Man declares that he will remain on the team and continue helping aliens despite his dislike for them. When the Legion battles an ancient being known as the Bringer of Chaos, Earth-Man absorbs the powers of both his fellow Legionnaires and the villain himself. Earth-Man kills the villain, but dies in the confrontation.

== Powers and abilities ==
Niedrigh has the ability to absorb and duplicate the superpowers of metahumans and aliens. However he is not able to copy the knowledge or skills, so it will normally take time for him to master a new power. He absorbs energies of people within a certain range of him, anywhere from several feet to a mile radius. He has shown the capacity to manifest numerous powers at the same time. The absorbed powers only last for twelve hours at a time.

As a member of the Legion of Super-Heroes, he is provided with a Legion Flight Ring. It allows him to fly and protects him from the vacuum of space and other dangerous environments. Earth-Man also temporarily possessed a Green Lantern ring given to him by Dyogene.

== In other media ==
Kirt Niedrigh appears in Smallville Season 11: Argo as a member of the EarthGov army and Minister at odds with New Krypton.
