= XS (character) =

Fictional character, a superheroine in the future of the DC Comics universe

- XS as depicted in Legionnaires #0 (October 1994). Art by Jeff Moy.

Publication information
- Publisher: DC Comics
- First appearance: Legionnaires #0 (October 1994)
- Created by: Tom McCraw; Jeff Moy

In-story information
- Alter ego: Jenni Ognats
- Species: Metahuman
- Team affiliations: Legion of Super-Heroes
- Abilities: Powers: Superhuman speed, agility, reflexes, durability, and stamina; Speed force aura conduit; Phasing; Vortex creations; Accelerated healing; Enhanced senses; Anti-friction aura; Abilities: Advanced hand-to-hand combatant and martial artist; Equipment: Legion flight ring

XS (Jenni Ognats) is a character appearing in media published by DC Comics, primarily as a member of the 30th–31st centuries's Legion of Super-Heroes. She is the granddaughter of Barry Allen (the second superhero known as the Flash), and cousin of Bart Allen (the second Kid Flash). Her first appearance is in Legionnaires #0 (Oct 1994).

Jessica Parker Kennedy portrayed a variation of the character in The CW Arrowverse television series The Flash.

== Fictional character biography ==
Jenni Ognats is the granddaughter of Barry Allen (the Flash) and the daughter of Dawn Allen (one of the Tornado Twins). Despite her speedster heritage, Jenni does not initially possess superhuman speed. As a baby, she is held hostage by President Thawne, only escaping danger when several of the Allens back down.

At the sight of her father Jeven Ognats being tortured, Jenni's latent super-speed powers activate, enabling her to save herself and her father from the Dominators. After gaining control of her powers, Jenni is drafted into the Legion of Super-Heroes as the speedster XS, serving as the team's equivalent to the Flash.

During the Legion's first trip to the 20th century, XS is separated from them and encounters her cousin Bart Allen (Impulse). XS battles alongside Impulse and other speedsters during the events of Dead Heat. Afterwards, the 27th century Flash fixes the Cosmic Treadmill, enabling XS to return to her time.

XS is one of the Legionnaires left behind after many of her teammates are lost in the 21st century, causing the team to disband. She travels to Xanthu with her teammate Star Boy, where they are caught in a war between Xanthu and Robotica.

The Final Crisis: Legion of 3 Worlds miniseries reveals that the Tornado Twins and their family members (including XS) originated on the same Earth as the post-Infinite Crisis version of the Legion, which was introduced in "The Lightning Saga". After Barry Allen's death in Crisis on Infinite Earths, the Twins and their families became the target of Professor Zoom, who was attempting to sabotage Don Allen and Meloni Thawne's marriage. Both families escaped to Earth-247 and the Twins died soon after in unknown circumstances.

XS helps Brainiac 5 revive her cousin, Bart Allen, by retrieving his spirit from the Speed Force. After the battle with Superboy-Prime and his Legion of Super-Villains, XS resigns from the Legion. Bart asks her to join him in the 21st century, but she decides to stay in the 31st century with the Legion to locate their surviving relatives. Her friend and teammate, Gates, also stays behind to accompany her.

== Powers and abilities ==
XS possesses Speed Force-based powers like the other members of her family (Barry Allen, Bart Allen, Wally West and Iris West II). She can run at near-light speeds, vibrate through solid matter, and travel through time and space by altering her molecular vibrational frequencies.

As a member of the Legion of Super-Heroes, XS is provided a Legion Flight Ring, which allows her to fly and protects her from the vacuum of space and other dangerous environments.

== In other media ==
=== Television ===
- XS makes a non-speaking cameo appearance in the Legion of Super Heroes two-part series finale "Dark Victory".
- A character based on XS and Dawn Allen named Nora West-Allen appears in The Flash, portrayed by Jessica Parker Kennedy. She is the future daughter of Barry Allen and Iris West-Allen from the year 2049 and the older sister of Bart Allen.

=== Video games ===
XS appears as a character summon in Scribblenauts Unmasked: A DC Comics Adventure.

=== Miscellaneous ===
XS appears in Adventures in the DC Universe #10.
