= Legion of Super-Heroes (1994 team) =

1994 version of the Legion of Super-Heroes

- The Legion of Super-Heroes, with their allies and enemies Art by Phil Jimenez

Group publication information
- Publisher: DC Comics
- First appearance: Legion of Super-Heroes (vol. 4) #0 (October 1994)
- Created by: Mark Waid and Tom McCraw (writers); Stuart Immonen (artist)

In-story information
- Base(s): Legion headquarters Legion World

Roster
- See: List of Legion of Super-Heroes members

Legion of Super-Heroes
- : Cover of Legion of Super-Heroes (vol. 4) #0 (October 1994). Art by Stuart Immonen & Ron Boyd.

Series publication information
- Publisher: DC Comics
- Schedule: Monthly
- Format: Ongoing series, Limited series
- Genre: Superhero
- Publication date: (Legion of Super-Heroes (vol. 4)); October 1994 – May 2000 (Legionnaires); October 1994 – March 2000 (Legion Lost); May 2000 – April 2001 (The Legion); December 2001 – October 2004
- Number of issues: (vol. 4): 64; Legionnaires: 63; Legion Lost: 12; The Legion: 38

Creative team
- Writer(s): Mark Waid; Tom McCraw; Tom Peyer; Roger Stern; Dan Abnett; Andy Lanning; Gail Simone
- Penciller(s): Lee Moder; Jeffrey Moy; Jason Armstrong; Scott Kolins; Olivier Coipel; Dan Jurgens
- Inker(s): Ron Boyd; W.C. Carani; Andy Smith
- Colorist(s): Tom McCraw
- Creator(s): Mark Waid and Tom McCraw (writers); Stuart Immonen (artist)

The 1994 version of the Legion of Super-Heroes (also called the post–Zero Hour or Reboot Legion) is a superhero team in the 31st century of the DC Universe. The team is the second incarnation of the Legion of Super-Heroes, following after the 1958 version, and was followed by the 2004 rebooted version. It first appeared in Legion of Super-Heroes (vol. 4) #0 (October 1994) and was created by Mark Waid, Tom McCraw, and Stuart Immonen.

== Publication history ==
Following Zero Hour, a new Legion continuity was created, beginning with a retelling of the origin story starting in Legion of Super-Heroes (vol. 4) #0 and then continued in spin-off sister series Legionnaires #0 (both released in October 1994). Lightning Lad was renamed Live Wire, and after the group's founding, a large number of heroes were added to the roster very quickly. Several members from the previous continuity were given new codenames, and some new heroes were added, including XS (the granddaughter of Barry Allen, the second Flash), Kinetix, Sensor, and Gates.

While in some ways following the pattern of the original continuity, the new continuity diverged from the old one in several ways: some characters died as they had previously, others did not, and some Legion members spent time in the 20th century, where they recruited Ferro. The Legion also started out having to earn the respect of the United Planets, which they did through two well-earned victories: successfully defending Earth from the White Triangle, a group of Daxamite racial purists; and exposing United Planets President Chu as the mastermind behind the Braal-Titan War, the Sun-Eater hoax, the formation of the Fatal Five, and the brainwashing of future Legionnaire Jan Arrah.

New writers Dan Abnett and Andy Lanning came on board with penciller Olivier Coipel to produce a dark story leading to the near-collapse of the United Planets and the Legion. In the wake of the disaster, a group of Legionnaires disappeared through a spatial rift and the two existing Legion series came to an end. The limited series Legion Lost (2000–2001) chronicled the difficult journey of these Legionnaires to return home, while the ensuing limited series Legion Worlds (2001) showed what was happening in the United Planets during their absence.

A new series, The Legion, was launched in which the Legion was reunited and given a new base and purpose. Written for its first 33 issues by Abnett and Lanning, the series was cancelled with issue #38. The most notable addition to the team during the title's publication was Superboy, a 21st-century clone of Superman who had previously been granted honorary membership.

=== Final Crisis: Legion of 3 Worlds ===
The Post-Zero Hour Legion reappeared in the 2008-2009 Final Crisis: Legion of 3 Worlds limited series, written by Geoff Johns and drawn by George Pérez. The miniseries features the 1994 Legion teaming up with Superman and the post-Infinite Crisis and 2004 incarnations of the Legion to fight a new incarnation of the Legion of Super-Villains (led by Superboy-Prime) and the Time Trapper.

It is revealed at the end of the miniseries that Earth-247, the home universe of the Legion, was destroyed during the events of Infinite Crisis. The post-Zero Hour Legion, under the guidance of Shikari Lonestar, travels the multiverse to look for survivors from other universes that were destroyed.

== Workforce ==
Workforce

Publication information
- Publisher: DC Comics
- First appearance: Legion of Super-Heroes (vol. 4) #64 (January 1995)
- Created by: Mark Waid (script); Lee Moder (art); Tom McCraw (art)

In-story information
- Member(s): Amber; Blast-Off; Dune; Evolvo Lad; Inferno; Karate Kid; Lori Morning; Particon; Radion; Repulse; Spider Girl; Ultra Boy

The Workforce is a fictional semi-heroic-super-team, in DC Comics' Post-Zero Hour Legion of Super-Heroes continuity. The group was introduced in Legion of Super-Heroes #64 (January 1995).

=== Fictional history ===
The Workforce was founded by corrupt industrialist Leland McCauley as a response to the Legion of Super-Heroes, founded by his rival R. J. Brande. When Live Wire was replaced in the Legion by his sister Spark, he joined Workforce under the belief that McCauley could help him find his brother Mekt. While the team often appeared to be performing heroic deeds, everything they did was designed for McCauley's profit.

A later version of the group consisted entirely of adults, to make the point that the Legion was endangering teenagers. However, a member of this group was actually the eight-year-old Lori Morning, using an H-Dial to appear as an adult.

The group disbanded during the "One Year Gap" and was replaced by the "Oversight Watch."

=== Membership ===
==== Original members ====
- Spider Girl (fired to create "Adult Workforce")
- Evolvo (fired to create "Adult Workforce")
- Ultra Boy (quit, joined Legion)
- Karate Kid (quit, joined Legion)
- Inferno (transported to 20th century Earth)

==== Later members ====
- Blast-Off (deceased)
- Particon (contract bought out by R. J. Brande)
- Radion (contract bought out by R. J. Brande)

==== Adult Workforce ====
- Repulse
- Amber
- Dune
- Lori Morning

== In other media ==
Elements of Workforce are incorporated into the incarnation of the Legion of Super-Villains that appears in Legion of Super Heroes (2006).

== See also ==
- Legion of Super-Heroes
- Legion of Super-Heroes (1958 team)
- Legion of Super-Heroes (2004 team)
- List of Legion of Super-Heroes members
- List of Legion of Super-Heroes publications
