= Jimmy Janes =

American comics artist (1947–2020)

- Born: Jimmy Janes; July 17, 1947 New York City, United States
- Died: September 1, 2020 (aged 73)
- Areas: Penciller, Inker
- Notable works: Legion of Super-Heroes

Jimmy Janes (July 17, 1947 – September 1, 2020) was an American comics artist and storyboard artist best known for his work on DC Comics' Legion of Super-Heroes series.

== Early life ==
Jimmy Janes was born July 17, 1947 on Staten Island, New York and graduated from the High School of Art and Design in Manhattan.

== Career ==
His first published work in the comics industry appeared in Greaser Comics #2 (1972), an underground comix written by George DiCaprio and published by Rip Off Press. He then drew stories for Charlton Comics, Marvel Comics, and Warren Publishing over the course of the next several years. Janes began working for DC Comics in 1980 when he became the penciller of the Legion of Super-Heroes as of #263 (May 1980). He drew 15 issues of that series, including "The Exaggerated Death of Ultra Boy" storyline which was written by Gerry Conway, Roy Thomas, and Paul Levitz as well as the Secrets of the Legion of Super-Heroes limited series (January–March 1981) written by E. Nelson Bridwell and Paul Kupperberg.

At Marvel Comics, he pencilled Marvel Team-Up #95 (July 1980) which featured Spider-Man meeting Mockingbird, the new superheroic identity of Bobbi Morse. Janes was one of several artists to draw the comics adaptation of Xanadu in Marvel Super Special #17 (Summer 1980). After concluding his run on the Legion of Super-Heroes with issue #282 (December 1981), Janes drew a back-up story for Moon Knight #16 (February 1982) and then moved into the animation profession.

In 1988, Janes was a character designer and storyboard artist on the Teenage Mutant Ninja Turtles animated television series. He later worked on other animated series such as Batman: The Animated Series, Exosquad, Extreme Ghostbusters, The Incredible Hulk, The Karate Kid, RoboCop: Alpha Commando, Spider-Man: The Animated Series, Swamp Thing, and X-Men: The Animated Series.

Janes died on September 1, 2020, at the age of 73.

== Bibliography ==
=== Charlton Comics ===
- The Many Ghosts of Doctor Graves #36 (1973)
- Scary Tales #20 (1979)

=== DC Comics ===
- Dragonlance #14 (1989)
- Ghosts #90, 95 (covers only) (1980)
- Green Lantern #135 (cover only) (1980)
- House of Mystery #314 (1983)
- Legion of Super-Heroes vol. 2 #263–267, 269–271, 273, 275, 277–280, 282 (1980–1981)
- Secrets of Haunted House #31 (cover only) (1980)
- Secrets of the Legion of Super-Heroes #1–3 (1981)
- The Superman Family #203, 213 ("The Private Life of Clark Kent"), #212 ("Mr. & Mrs. Superman") (1980–1981)
- Time Warp #5 (1980)
- The Unexpected #201, 205–206 (covers only) (1980–1981)
- Unknown Soldier #243 (1980)
- World's Finest Comics #265 (Green Arrow) (1980)

==== Collected editions ====
- Legion of Super-Heroes: Before the Darkness Vol. 1 includes Legion of Super-Heroes vol. 2 #263–267, 269–271 and Secrets of the Legion of Super-Heroes #1–3, 340 pages, February 2021 ISBN 9781779507594
- Legion of Super-Heroes: Before the Darkness Vol. 2 includes Legion of Super-Heroes vol. 2 #273, 275, 277–280, and 282, 360 pages, February 2022 ISBN 9781779510778

=== Heroic Publishing ===
- Eternity Smith #1 (1987)
- The Marksman #1 (1988)

=== Marvel Comics ===
- Marvel Feature #8 (Ant-Man/Hank Pym) (1973)
- Marvel Super Special #17 (Xanadu adaptation) (1980)
- Marvel Team-Up #95 (Spider-Man and Mockingbird) (1980)
- Moon Knight #16 (1982)

=== Renegade Press ===
- Eternity Smith #2, 5 (1986–1987)

=== Rip Off Press ===
- Greaser Comics #2 (1972)

=== Warren Publishing ===
- 1984 #2–4, 7 (1978–1979)
- Eerie #46, 100, 104–105 (1973–1979)
- Rook Magazine #1 (1979)
- Vampirella #84 (1979)

| Preceded by James Sherman | Legion of Super-Heroes vol. 2 artist 1980–1981 | Succeeded by Howard Bender |
