= Yera Allon =

DC Comics character

Publication information
- Publisher: DC Comics
- First appearance: Posing as Shrinking Violet: Legion of Super-Heroes (vol. 2) #287 (March 1982); True form and identity revealed: Legion of Super-Heroes (vol. 2) #305 (November 1983)
- Created by: Paul Levitz; Keith Giffen; Pat Broderick

In-story information
- Alter ego: Yera Allon
- Species: Durlan
- Place of origin: Durla
- Team affiliations: Legion of Super-Heroes
- Notable aliases: Shrinking Violet, Chameleon Girl
- Abilities: Shapeshifting

Yera Allon, also known as Chameleon Girl, is a superheroine and Legion of Super-Heroes member in the DC Universe's 30th and 31st centuries.

== Fictional character biography ==
=== Pre-Zero Hour ===
In the original continuity prior to Zero Hour: Crisis in Time!, veteran Legionnaire Colossal Boy (Gim Allon) was finally able to act upon his unrequited feelings for his teammate Shrinking Violet when the two became a romantic couple and married. The pairing was a surprise to almost everyone, as Violet had previously been in a relationship with Duplicate Boy, a member of the Heroes of Lallor. When Duplicate Boy learned of the relationship, he tracked the couple down and beat Colossal Boy mercilessly until he realized what no one else had yet deduced: the woman involved with Colossal Boy was not Shrinking Violet.

In reality, Shrinking Violet had been kidnapped by radicals from her home planet Imsk. She was replaced in the Legion by Yera Allon, a Durlan who used her shapeshifting abilities to impersonate Violet. When "Violet" becomes involved with Colossal Boy, Element Lad and Shvaughn Erin become suspicious, particularly since "Violet" was seemingly cheating on Duplicate Boy without trying to hide it. Along with Brainiac 5 and Chameleon Boy, the two expose Yera as an imposter and rescue the real Violet. However, the love between Gim and Yera is genuine, and they remain together despite the initial deception.

=== Post-Infinite Crisis ===
The events of Infinite Crisis restore a close analogue of the pre-Crisis on Infinite Earths Legion to continuity, with Yera joining the Legion as Chameleon Girl. The events following the "Five Year Gap" have not been reincorporated into current continuity, with Chameleon Girl and Shrinking Violet remaining at odds with one another.

=== Legion Lost, volume 2 ===
In Legion Lost, Yera is stranded on 21st century Earth (along with teammates Wildfire, Dawnstar, Timber Wolf, Tyroc, Tellus, and Gates) on a mission to save the future. The group are forced to remain in the 21st century after learning that they may have contracted a pathogen that could destroy the 31st century if they return.

=== The New Golden Age ===
In "The New Golden Age", Chameleon Girl is among the Legion of Super-Heroes members who arrive in the present and confront the Justice Society of America over their decision to recruit Legionnaire, a younger version of Mordru who wants to avoid becoming evil.

== Powers and abilities ==
As a Durlan, Yera Allon can shapeshift.
