= Legion of Super-Heroes (2004 team) =

Fictional characters in DC comics

- Cover art for Legion of Super-Heroes (vol. 5) #37. Art by Francis Manapul and John Livesay.

Group publication information
- Publisher: DC Comics
- First appearance: Teen Titans/Legion Special (November 2004)
- Created by: Mark Waid; Barry Kitson

In-story information
- Base(s): Legion Clubhouse

Roster
- See: List of Legion of Super-Heroes members

Legion of Super-Heroes
- : Cover of Legion of Super-Heroes, vol. 5, #1. Art by Barry Kitson (2005).

Series publication information
- Publisher: DC Comics
- Schedule: Monthly
- Format: Ongoing series
- Genre: Superhero
- Publication date: List: Legion of Super-Heroes (vol. 5) February 2005 – April 2006 March 2008 – March 2009 Supergirl and the Legion of Super-Heroes May 2006 – February 2008
- Number of issues: List: Legion of Super-Heroes (vol. 5) 28 (#1-15, #38-50) Supergirl and the Legion of Super-Heroes 22 (#16-37)

Creative team
- Writer(s): List: Mark Waid Jim Shooter
- Penciller(s): List: Barry Kitson Francis Manapul
- Inker(s): List: Mick Gray John Livesay
- Colorist(s): Jonathan Smith
- Creator(s): Mark Waid; Barry Kitson

The 2004 version of the Legion of Super-Heroes (also called the Threeboot Legion) is a superhero team in the 31st century of the DC Comics Universe. The team is the third incarnation of the Legion of Super-Heroes after the 1958 and 1994 versions. It first appears in Teen Titans/Legion Special (November 2004) and was created by Mark Waid and Barry Kitson.

== Publication history ==
The cover of The Legion of Super-Heroes (vol. 5) #6 (July 2005), featuring the Legionnaires. Art by Barry Kitson.

Following a crossover with the Teen Titans in Teen Titans (vol. 3) #16 and the Teen Titans/Legion Special, a new Legion of Super-Heroes series was launched, written by Mark Waid (who had previously rebooted the title following the events of Zero Hour) and penciled by Barry Kitson. This new series recreated the team from the beginning and used the Boy/Lad/Girl/Lass/Kid codenames which the end of the original continuity and the prior reboot continuity had moved away from using.

Initial issues of this series reintroduced the characters and provided new and divergent origins for them. Most characters resembled their previous counterparts in costume and powers, with the most notable exceptions including Chameleon Boy, now called simply Chameleon and depicted as an androgynous creature, Star Boy, who in this version of the Legion is black, Colossal Boy, who is now a giant who shrinks to human size, and Phantom Girl, who exists in two universes at once and has conversations with people in her own dimension while talking to Legionnaires at the same time.

The future universe of this Legion is an emotionally and mentally repressive society which involves human sexuality and contact being kept at arms' length as well as Orwellian surveillance of minors. The Legion's main goal is social reform as well as protecting people and inspiring them with the legends of superheroes of old, even though the team isn't appreciated by various government authorities.

The Legion is worshiped by thousands of young people on various different worlds who worship the group in a cult-like manner, collectively known as the "Legionnaires". The Legionnaires based on Earth keep a constant vigil outside Legion headquarters.

Beginning with issue #16, The Legion of Super-Heroes (vol. 5) was retitled Supergirl and the Legion of Super-Heroes with Supergirl traveling to the future and joining the Legion. With issue #31, Tony Bedard replaced Waid as writer. The title reverted to The Legion of Super-Heroes with issue #37 and Jim Shooter became writer. The series ended with issue #50, in which the script was credited to "Justin Thyme", a pseudonym previously used by uncredited comic book artists.

=== Final Crisis: Legion of 3 Worlds ===
This version of the Legion also appeared in the 2008–09 Final Crisis: Legion of 3 Worlds limited series, written by Geoff Johns and drawn by George Pérez. The mini-series features this version of the Legion teaming up with the 1994 and post-Infinite Crisis incarnations of the Legion and Superman to fight the Time Trapper and a new incarnation of the Legion of Super-Villains (led by Superboy-Prime). It is revealed at the end of the mini-series that this version of the team inhabits Earth-Prime, the home of Superboy-Prime.

== See also ==
- Legion of Super-Heroes
- Legion of Super-Heroes (1958 team)
- Legion of Super-Heroes (1994 team)
- List of Legion of Super-Heroes members
- List of Legion of Super-Heroes publications
