= The Exaggerated Death of Ultra Boy =

1981 DC Comics story arc

- Publisher: DC Comics
- Publication date: March – December 1981
- Genre: Science fiction, superhero
- Title(s): Legion of Super-Heroes vol. 2, #273–275, 277–282
- Main character(s): Legion of Super-Heroes; Pulsar Stargrave; Grimbor the Chainsman; Time Trapper; Lana Lang (Insect Queen)

Creative team
- Writer(s): Gerry Conway; Roy Thomas; Paul Levitz
- Penciller(s): Jimmy Janes; Steve Ditko
- Inker(s): Frank Chiaramonte; Bruce D. Patterson
- Editor(s): Mike W. Barr; Jack C. Harris

"The Exaggerated Death of Ultra Boy" is a comic book story arc published by American company DC Comics, presented in Legion of Super-Heroes vol. 2, #273–275 and #277–282 (March–December 1981). It was written by Gerry Conway, Roy Thomas, and Paul Levitz, with pencils by Jimmy Janes and Steve Ditko. It depicts the long odyssey of Ultra Boy, who is incorrectly presumed to be slain in battle.

By the story arc's conclusion, retired member Superboy would return to the ranks of the Legion of Super-Heroes, and the questions surrounding Reflecto—first mentioned in "The Adult Legion" story as a future member destined to die—were finally resolved.

== Plot ==
=== Ultra Boy: Pirate ===
In the 30th century, newly elected Earth president Marte Allon (the mother of Colossal Boy) demands that the Legion of Super-Heroes disband, since the Legion's by-laws prohibit Legionnaires from killing, and Brainiac 5 apparently murdered Rimbor native An Ryd during a period of mental instability. (Note: Ultra Boy was framed for An Ryd's murder in Superboy and the Legion of Super-Heroes #239 (May 1978). A mentally unstable Brainiac 5 confessed to committing the crime in Superboy and the Legion of Super-Heroes #250 (April 1979).) To avoid dragging the team into a political quagmire, Brainiac 5 resigns. Convinced that his teammate was framed for An's murder, Chameleon Boy travels to Rimbor to investigate, along with Star Boy, Phantom Girl and Ultra Boy. They gather evidence to clear Brainiac 5, but are attacked by the android Pulsar Stargrave. Stargrave strikes Ultra Boy with a nova blast, seemingly disintegrating him. Brainiac 5 journeys to Rimbor's moon, where he defeats Stargrave.

Believing Ultra Boy to be dead, the Legionnaires hold a memorial service and erect a statue of him in the Hall of Heroes. In reality, the unconscious Ultra Boy travels light-years through space until he is retrieved by the pirate ship Antares. He regains consciousness with no memory of his identity. The pirates' leader, Captain Frake, adds him to her crew when she sees him using his powers. Soon thereafter, the Legion answers a Science Police distress call and attacks the pirates in orbit over Pluto. Despite the Legion Cruiser's superior power, the Antares escapes, largely because the amnesiac Ultra Boy is on her side. Frake attempts to seduce him, but his hazy memories of his romance with Phantom Girl prevent her from succeeding. Ultra Boy turns against the pirates when the Legion locates the Antares again and the ship is destroyed. Frake tries to destroy the Legion Cruiser using a radiation weapon. Ultra Boy jumps in front of the blast, which ricochets into the power crystal and destroys both the pirates and their lair. Ultra Boy disappears. Saturn Girl, who had earlier sensed his thoughts after his supposed death, begins to think that her mind is playing tricks on her.

=== Behold: Reflecto ===
While helping to rescue a sinking cargo-craft in the Pacific Ocean, Phantom Girl is entangled in seaweed and almost drowns. She is saved by a powerful metahuman named Reflecto, who flies her back to Legion Headquarters. Shortly thereafter, Grimbor the Chainsman erects a network of energy beams around the Earth. With spacecraft unable to bypass the chains, Grimbor demands that the United Planets surrender the Legion to him. The Legionnaires are unable to destroy the energy chains, but Saturn Girl tracks Grimbor to his stronghold near the North Pole.

Reflecto follows a group of Legionnaires containing Phantom Girl, displaying genuine concern for her well-being. He utilizes super-strength, invulnerability, super-speed and vision powers, making him seem familiar to Bouncing Boy and Duo Damsel. Later, as the energy-chains contract and begin to compress Earth's atmosphere, the Legionnaires attack Grimbor's stronghold. Having prepared in advance, Grimbor manages to defeat each Legionnaire, blaming them for the death of his lover Charma, who was killed by her fellow prison inmates. (Note: Charma was apprehended by the Legion in Superboy and the Legion of Super-Heroes #221 (November 1976).) Using the Augmatron, a device she has secretly built, Princess Projectra determines that the main Earth Council satellite is the key to the energy field. Karate Kid destroys the satellite, dissipating the chains. Meanwhile, Grimbor concludes that Reflecto is Ultra Boy in disguise. While Reflecto is using his super-strength, Grimbor blasts him with a powerful energy weapon. Reflecto survives the blast using his invulnerability. With the hero using two superpowers at the same time, Grimbor realizes that he cannot be Ultra Boy. (Note: Ultra Boy can only use one power at a time, as revealed in Adventure Comics #316 (January 1964).) Reflecto knocks Grimbor unconscious, and then collapses himself. As her teammates arrive, Phantom Girl discovers that Reflecto is wearing a mask, along with a second costume beneath his uniform. The Legionnaires are shocked to learn that Reflecto is Superboy.

=== The Return of Superboy ===
Superboy awakens, with Ultra Boy's conscious memories and personality overriding his own. Baffled by Superboy's appearance in the 30th century, particularly in light of Saturn Girl's command that he remain in his own era, (Note: After the Psycho-Warrior revealed the details of Jonathan and Martha Kent's deaths to Superboy, Saturn Girl subconsciously ordered Superboy to remain in the 20th century, where he would forget specific facts about his future life. – Legion of Super-Heroes vol. 2, #259 (January 1980)) team leader Lightning Lad takes six Legionnaires with him to 20th-century Smallville: Phantom Girl, Karate Kid, Dawnstar, Saturn Girl, Blok, and Superboy. (Note: As this group departs for the past, Batman inadvertently travels forward in time and arrives in the 30th century. Shortly thereafter, he and another group of Legionnaires (including honorary member Rond Vidar) prevent a terrorist bombing. – The Brave and the Bold #179 (October 1981)) Their Time Bubble materializes as a nuclear bomb is detonating. Superboy funnels the radiation harmlessly into space, but is unexpectedly attacked by the U.S. Army, who claims that he stole and detonated the bomb. The Legionnaires flee, seeking sanctuary at the Kent home. The group decides to briefly return to the 30th century, but the Time Bubble begins to shake violently and shatters. Suddenly, the Time Trapper reveals himself, stating that he is taking advantage of the Legionnaires' current dilemma to trap them in the past.

With the Trapper's Iron Curtain of Time in place, Superboy, Lightning Lad, Phantom Girl, Karate Kid and Saturn Girl venture into Smallville incognito. They are quickly recognized by Lana Lang, who is an honorary Legionnaire as Insect Queen. (Note: Lana Lang was granted honorary Legion membership in Adventure Comics #355 (April 1967).) To protect Superboy's secret identity, they refuse to answer her questions. Soon, a new Molecule Master android attacks the group, (Note: The Legion battled the first Molecule Master android in Superboy and the Legion of Super-Heroes #201 (March/April 1974)) who is joined by Blok and Dawnstar. After confirming that he was created by the Time Trapper, he battles the Legionnaires until he is overwhelmed and implodes. With the Army still viewing Superboy and the Legion as a threat, Phantom Girl shifts Superboy, Dawnstar, and herself to her homeworld Bgztl, which lies in a parallel dimension at the same coordinates as Earth. The other Legionnaires are captured by the military.

The implosion of the Molecule Master restores Superboy to normal. As Phantom Girl leads her teammates through trans-dimensional space back toward Earth, Dawnstar senses a familiar presence. Using her tracking powers, she locates Ultra Boy—alive but immobilized by a strange aura. He explains that the explosion of the pirates' power crystal propelled him backward in time, in a ghost-like state. Travelling back to 20th-century Smallville, he tried to enlist Superboy's help, but unintentionally superimposed his memories over those of Superboy. He tried to use the A-bomb test to break free, but only succeeded in further scrambling their memories. Upon travelling back to his own century, Saturn Girl's psychic command over Superboy asserted itself, subconsciously forcing him to create the Reflecto identity.

Using nearby radioactive rock, Superboy frees Ultra Boy. Meanwhile, Lana uses her Bio-Ring to become Insect Queen and attempts to free the jailed Legionnaires. Just as the military is about to defeat her, Superboy's group arrives and frees their teammates. The heroes travel to Bgztl, from which Superboy and Ultra Boy bypass the Trapper's Iron Curtain and return the group to their own era. They attack the Trapper in his Citadel and defeat him—for the time being. (Note: Subsequently, it is revealed that the Time Trapper who battled the Legion in this incident was an imposter. – Legionnaires 3 #1 (February 1986)) Saturn Girl mentally erases Superboy's knowledge of the circumstances surrounding his parents' deaths, and he returns to his time period, where he plans to explain things to the President of the United States and obtain a pardon. The Legion converts the Ultra Boy statue into a Reflecto statue, making Ultra Boy the only living Legionnaire enshrined in the team's hall of deceased heroes. (Note: The Reflecto statue first appeared in the "Adult Legion" story in Adventure Comics #354 (March 1967), which foreshadowed Reflecto's "death" at the hands of the Molecule Master.) Thrilled to be reunited, he and Phantom Girl go on leave for a few days.

== Continuity with "The Adult Legion" ==
Fourteen years prior to the publication of this story arc, DC Comics presented a two-part tale called "The Adult Legion". It features one of Superman's encounters with the Legion of Super-Heroes as adults, and foreshadows several plot twists which occur in the years that follow.

For years, writers are careful to ensure that subsequent storylines are consistent with the Adult Legion tale's vision of the future. One of the items seen in the story is a memorial statue of a previously unseen Legionnaire named Reflecto, who was said to have been "killed in a duel with the Molecule Master". In publishing "The Exaggerated Death of Ultra Boy", the Legion creative team fulfills this prophecy, as the implosion of the Molecule Master android destroys the Reflecto personality.

In 1983, the team depicted in "The Adult Legion" are revealed as inhabitants of a parallel Earth, freeing writers to ignore the story altogether.
