= Tyroc =

DC Comics character

- Tyroc as depicted in All-New Collectors' Edition C-55 (March 1978). Art by James Sherman and Jack Abel.

Publication information
- Publisher: DC Comics
- First appearance: Superboy #216 (April 1976)
- Created by: Cary Bates (writer); Mike Grell (artist)

In-story information
- Alter ego: Troy Stewart
- Species: Metahuman
- Place of origin: Earth
- Team affiliations: Legion of Super-Heroes
- Abilities: Reality warping scream

Tyroc (Troy Stewart) is a fictional character appearing in media published by DC Comics, primarily as a member of the Legion of Super-Heroes in the 30th and 31st centuries. Created by writer Cary Bates and artist Mike Grell, he first appeared in Superboy #216 (April 1976), and is one of DC's first black superheroes.

== Publication history ==
Tyroc first appeared in Superboy #216 (April 1976), and was created by Cary Bates and Mike Grell.

Jim Shooter, who had been prevented from introducing black characters into the Legion in the 1960s, objected to the characterization of Tyroc: "...I always wanted to have a character who was African-American, and years later, when they did that, they did it in the worst way possible....instead of just incidentally having a character who happens to be black...they made a big fuss about it. He's a racial separatist....I just found it pathetic and appalling".

According to Mike Grell, who co-created Tyroc with Cary Bates, the character of Tyroc was "sort of a sore spot with me". He had previously tried to introduce black characters into the series, but had been prevented by then-editor Murray Boltinoff. Grell recalled: "I kept getting stalled off...and finally comes Tyroc. They might as well have named him Tyrone. Their explanation for why there were no black people [in the Legion] was that all the black people had gone to live on an island. It's possibly the most racist concept I've ever heard in my life...I mean, it's a segregationist's dream, right? So they named him Tyroc, and gave him the world's stupidest super-power".

Grell's dislike of Tyroc was strong enough that he deliberately made him look ridiculous: "I gave him a silly costume. It was somewhere between Elvis' Las Vegas costume and something you would imagine a pimp on the street corner wearing".

Grell notes that physically, Tyroc is based on football player Fred Williamson: "I modeled him somewhat on Fred "The Hammer" Williamson, who was a movie star at the time...and gave him this "Elvis Presley goes to Las Vegas" kind of a costume, and that's pretty much it. That was the extent of my contribution to Tyroc".

Some writers like long-time Legion scribe Paul Levitz claimed that Tyroc's powers, based upon sound, made him too difficult a character to depict in a comic book. Levitz states that this was because he thought Tyroc was "just such a stupid character....a sound-based character is, I think, intrinsically futile in a silent medium. He just never worked for me, so I did my best to dodge him". Despite his initial stance on the character, Levitz said in a Newsarama interview that Tyroc would be in his new Legion of Super-Heroes series. Tyroc appears in Legion of Super-Heroes (vol. 6), marking the first time that the character has appeared in an in-continuity tale written by Levitz.

== Fictional character biography ==
Tyroc from Superboy #216 artist Mike Grell.

Tyroc (real name Troy Stewart) is from Marzal, an island which usually exists in a different dimension and occasionally reappears on Earth, remaining for several years at a time off the coast of Africa. Marzal's residents are descended from African slaves who revolted on a ship during middle passage in the 18th century and settled on Marzal. They possess an advanced, highly technological civilization with extreme isolationist tendencies. In the language of Marzal, "Tyroc" means "Scream of the Devil".

The Legion of Super-Heroes first meet Tyroc when several Legionnaires respond to an emergency on Marzal. At first, Tyroc attempts to stop the Legion from assisting. After patching up their differences and working together to save the island, Tyroc is offered Legion membership. He initially refuses, although he comes to respect the Legion. Tyroc later accepts the Legion's offer to join the team and thus becomes the Legion's first black member.

Tyroc later returns to Marzal Island to be with his people when it leaves Earth. Shadow Lass and Dawnstar accompany him and are almost trapped on the island as it shifts dimensions.

Marzal is later destroyed by the Dominators. Jacques Foccart (the second Invisible Kid) and Troy Stewart, who had proven themselves as effective leaders of the rebellion against the Dominators, are appointed president and vice president of Earth respectively. Soon thereafter, Earth is destroyed in a disaster reminiscent of the destruction of Krypton over a millennium earlier. A few dozen cities and their inhabitants survive and come together to form New Earth. Jacques later resigns to rejoin the Legion and Troy ascends to the presidency.

=== Post-Infinite Crisis ===
Following Zero Hour: Crisis in Time!, which rebooted the Legion's continuity, Tyroc did not appear for many years, making brief appearances in Legion of Super-Heroes (vol. 5) #15 and Final Crisis: Legion of 3 Worlds #1. He returns in The New 52 title Legion Lost, where he, Wildfire, Gates, Dawnstar, Timber Wolf, Chameleon Girl, and Tellus are trapped in the 21st century while pursuing a time-traveling terrorist.

== Powers and abilities ==
Tyroc is a metahuman with reality-warping screams that possess various effects. He can create dimensional portals and force fields, transmute matter, generate fire and wind, telekinetically manipulate objects, manipulate weather and plants, induce vertigo, and view the past.

As a member of the Legion of Super-Heroes, he is provided with a Legion Flight Ring, which allows him to fly, survive in space, and communicate with his teammates.

== In other media ==
- Tyroc makes non-speaking cameo appearances in Legion of Super Heroes.
- Tyroc makes a non-speaking cameo appearance in Justice League vs. the Fatal Five.
