= The Culling (comics) =

2012 DC Comics storyline

"The Culling" is a 2012 DC Comic crossover story arc in their relaunched The New 52 line of superhero comics. It involves three titles: Teen Titans, Legion Lost, and Superboy, which is the conclusion to story arcs in all three titles involving the villainous organization N.O.W.H.E.R.E. It begins in Teen Titans Annual #1, and runs through the ninth issues of each of the three series.

In its wake, a new series titled The Ravagers was launched on May 30, 2012.

== Plot ==
Legion Lost characters in the plot arc include Beast Boy, Kid Flash, Superboy, Tim Drake, Wonder Girl, and the Titans. The organization N.O.W.H.E.R.E. captures Legion Lost, the Teen Titans, and Superboy, forcing them to fight amongst each other to weed out the weakest of them. With Harvest refusing to give up, one of the teen superheroes ultimately has to make a sacrifice for the others.

== Release ==
In May 2012, Legion Lost #9 was sent to MTV to be previewed, with Tom DeFalco as the issue writer and Pete Woods as artist. The graphic novel released in 2013 includes Teen Titans #8-12, 0 and DC Comics Presents #12. The graphic novel Legion Lost Volume 2: The Culling, which collected issues #0 and #8-16 of Legion Lost, had writing by DeFalco, art by Aaron Kuder, Woods, and others, and the cover by Tyler Kirkham.

=== Titles involved ===
Title	Issue(s)	Writer(s)	Artist(s)	Notes
Preludes
Superboy	#8	Tom DeFalco, Scott Lobdell	Iban Coella, R.B. Silva	
Legion Lost	#8	Tom DeFalco	Aaron Kuder	
Teen Titans	#8	Scott Lobdell	Ig Guara	
Main storyline
Teen Titans	Annual #1, #9	Tom DeFalco, Scott Lobdell	Brett Booth, Ig Guara	"The Culling" Part 1 & 4
Superboy	#9	Tom DeFalco, Scott Lobdell	R.B. Silva	"The Culling" Part 2
Legion Lost	#9	Tom DeFalco	Pete Woods	"The Culling" Part 3

== Reception ==
IGN described The Culling story arc negatively, writing that the Teen Titans "pulled us through the muck that was The Culling."

== Collected editions ==
- The Culling: Rise of the Ravagers (Legion Lost #8–9, Superboy #8–9, Teen Titans #8–9 and Teen Titans Annual #1)
- Teen Titans Vol. 2: The Culling (Teen Titans #8–14 and DC Universe Presents #12)
- Superboy Vol. 2: Extraction (Superboy #0 & #8–12 and Teen Titans #10)
- Legion Lost Vol 2: The Culling (Legion Lost #0 & #8–16)
