= Inferno (DC Comics) =

Fictional character in the DC Comics universe

- Inferno

Publication information
- Publisher: DC Comics
- First appearance: Legion of Super-Heroes (vol. 4) #64 (January 1995)
- Created by: Tom Peyer; Jeffrey Moy

In-story information
- Alter ego: Sandy Anderson
- Team affiliations: Workforce; Legion of Super-Heroes
- Abilities: Ability to generate and manipulate fire

Inferno (Sandy Anderson) is a superheroine of the DC Comics universe. The character is a former ally of the Legion of Super-Heroes in the future, but currently resides in the present day.

== Fictional character biography ==
Inferno is introduced in post-Zero Hour continuity, which rebooted the Legion of Super-Heroes. She is a member of Workforce who works alongside Live Wire after he resigns from the Legion and is replaced by his sister Ayla. As a member of Workforce, Inferno is fond of immolating opponents.

Inferno's real name is stated to be Sandy Anderson when she and the Legion of Super-Heroes are placed in a simulation resembling rural 1950s America. The Legionnaires' names are all anglicized to names of that time period, which initially made it unclear if Sandy Anderson was her actual name or an approximation. In 1997, Inferno received a self-titled miniseries, which established Sandy Anderson to be her actual name.

Inferno is transported to the 20th century by the Emerald Eye of Ekron. She assists with battling the Sun-Eater, as detailed in The Final Night. Not feeling any affiliation to the Legion, she remains in the past while the other Legionnaires return to the 30th century.

In the Threeboot continuity, Inferno is a member of the Wanderers, a black ops group who oppose the Legion. This version of Inferno comes from Mercury and has green skin.
