= Wildfire (Drake Burroughs) =

DC Comics superhero

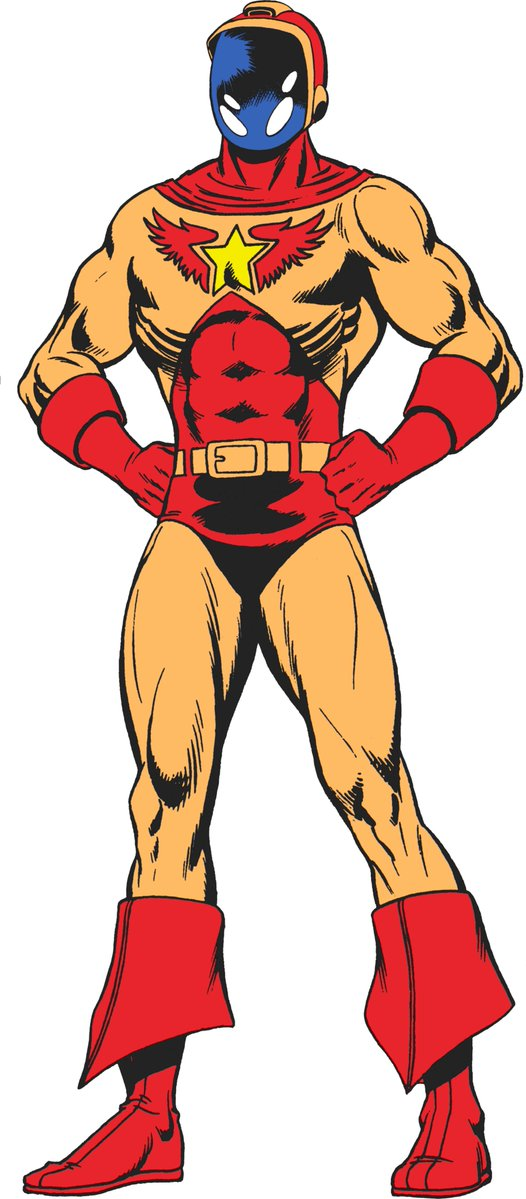
- Wildfire pencilled and inked by Dave Cockrum

Publication information
- Publisher: DC Comics
- First appearance: Superboy and the Legion of Super-Heroes #195 (June 1973)
- Created by: Cary Bates (writer); Dave Cockrum (artist)

In-story information
- Alter ego: Drake Burroughs
- Species: Metahuman
- Place of origin: Earth (31st century)
- Team affiliations: Legion of Super-Heroes
- Notable aliases: ERG-1, NRG
- Abilities: Anti-energy physiology; Superhuman strength and durability; High-speed flight; Energy manipulation; Minor object conjuration

Wildfire is a superhero appearing in DC Comics, primarily as a member of the Legion of Super-Heroes in the 30th and 31st centuries. Created by Cary Bates and Dave Cockrum, the character debuted in Superboy #195 (June 1973).

== Publication history ==
Cockrum originally wanted to name the character Starfire, but was rejected because there were already plans to introduce a character named Starfire in the Teen Titans.

Wildfire was immediately popular with readers. At that time, the editors of Superboy and the Legion of Super-Heroes held periodic elections in which readers could choose the Legion's leader. Soon after his introduction, Wildfire was elected to that post. In-story, Wildfire lost the election to Superboy, but as no candidate had received a majority of the votes, the membership decided that the Legion needed a member who was available full-time rather than Superboy, who is a part-time member of the Legion.

== Fictional character biography ==
=== Original ===
Wildfire is originally Drake Burroughs, an engineering student at Metropolis University. While helping with a propulsion system developed by the university, Burroughs accidentally disables a safety valve. A blast of antimatter energy engulfs Burroughs, who is transformed into an energy being, with his original body being disintegrated. Professor Vultan, Burroughs' teacher, creates a containment suit to contain his energy. He regains a humanoid form, but has no physical body and lacks most human sensory functions, such as taste and touch.

Calling himself ERG-1 (Energy Release Generator 1), Drake Burroughs applies for membership in the Legion. He is turned down because his abilities are identical to those of other members such as Mon-El, Colossal Boy, and Chemical King. Anxious to prove his abilities, Burroughs follows several Legionnaires on a mission to the planet Manna-5. During this mission, Colossal Boy is knocked unconscious by an enemy machine and none of the other Legionnaires present have the power to save him. ERG-1 destroys the machine, but he expels all his energy from his containment suit and is presumed dead.

Initially, Wildfire and Superboy are rivals and fight over the position of team leader. Wildfire acquits himself well in that battle, establishing that his raw power is comparable to a Kryptonian's. As leader, Wildfire receives mixed reviews. Though he is decisive and a gifted tactician, his poor people skills alienate many of his fellow members. He leads the Legion through the Earthwar and Omega crises but is defeated in re-election by Lightning Lad.

Shortly after becoming leader, Wildfire recruits Dawnstar into the Legion of Super-Heroes. He becomes enamored with her, but for years the two have a love-hate relationship. It is clear to their teammates that they are extremely fond of each other, if not actively in love, but Dawnstar will not admit her feelings. Wildfire, in return, is often passive-aggressive in his treatment of her. It is eventually revealed that Dawnstar does reciprocate his feelings, but she fears that she will never know physical love since Wildfire does not possess a physical body.

Some time later, the Legion admits an extra-dimensional being, Quislet. Like Wildfire, Quislet is an entity of pure energy and requires a containment device to survive on Earth. Unlike Wildfire, though, Quislet's condition is natural to his species. He teaches Wildfire how to control his energy form without needing the containment suit. In this new form, Wildfire is much closer to human, being visible, tangible, and possessing facial features, but his body is still so hot that his mere touch burns Dawnstar. Wildfire loses the ability to maintain his form after Quislet returns to his dimension.

=== Post-Zero Hour ===
Wildfire

Publication information
- Publisher: DC Comics
- First appearance: Legionnaires #74 (August 1999)

In-story information
- Alter ego: Drake Burroughs
- Team affiliations: Legion of Super-Heroes; Amazers (Atom'X only), Workforce (Blast-Off only); Justice League
- Notable aliases: ERG-1, Atom'X (Randall Burroughs), Blast-Off I (Jahr-Drake Ningle)
- Abilities: Composed of thermonuclear energy

Following Zero Hour, Wildfire is absent from Legion comics for some years, and when he returns, he is given a drastically different origin.

In a fight with Mordru, Atom'X (Randall Burroughs) and Blast-Off (Jahr-Drake Ningle), members of the Uncanny Amazers and Workforce respectively, are seemingly killed. Some time later, several Legionnaires notice energy patterns in the area, and Umbra realizes that the energy is sentient. After containing the energy in a laboratory, the Legionnaires learn that it contains the combined consciousnesses of Burroughs and Ningle. The new being assumes the name Drake Burroughs after his forebears and the codename ERG-1.

Shortly afterward, ERG-1 is one of the Legionnaires lost in a spatial rift, with his containment suit being ripped open. Element Lad returns the other Legionnaires to normal space, but ERG-1's energy disperses into space, where it is mistaken for a star. Brainiac 5, with help from the alien Kwai, manages to create a new containment suit for him.

==== One year later ====
A new incarnation of Wildfire resembling the original version appears in the 2007 storyline "The Lightning Saga". This version's containment suit is made from Red Tornado's robotic shell, giving him access to his memories.

==== The New 52 ====
In Legion Lost, Wildfire, Dawnstar, Chameleon Girl, Tellus, Tyroc, Gates, and Timber Wolf are stranded in the 21st century while pursuing a time-traveling terrorist. While stranded in the past, Wildfire temporarily joins the Justice League.

== Powers and abilities ==
After being disintegrated by an antimatter wave, Wildfire was transformed into a being composed of antimatter with the ability to manipulate energy, fly at high speeds, and alter his size. However, he is forced to wear a containment suit at all times to maintain his form and prevent his energy from hurting others.

As a member of the Legion of Super-Heroes, Wildfire is provided a Legion Flight Ring, which enables him to fly and protects him from the vacuum of space and other dangerous environments.

== Other versions ==
- An alternate universe version of Wildfire appears in Legion of Super-Heroes Annual #5.
- An alternate universe version of Wildfire appears in Legion of Super-Heroes Annual #7. This version is the last surviving Legionnaire, his energy powers having rendered him immortal.
- An ancestor of Dawnstar known as Wildstar is a member of the 21st-century hero team R.E.B.E.L.S. She has the combined powers of Dawnstar and Wildfire.

== In other media ==
- Wildfire makes a non-speaking cameo appearance in the Justice League Unlimited episode "Far From Home".
- Wildfire makes non-speaking cameo appearances in Legion of Super Heroes (2006). According to producer James Tucker, he would have had a more prominent role in the cancelled third season, replacing Kell-El / Superman X as a member of the Legion.
- Wildfire makes a non-speaking cameo appearance in Legion of Super-Heroes (2023).
- Wildfire appears as a character summon in Scribblenauts Unmasked: A DC Comics Adventure.
