= Legion Lost =

Limited comic book series

- Cover for Legion Lost (vol. 2) #1 (September 2011), art by Pete Woods and Brad Anderson.

Publication information
- Publisher: DC Comics
- Schedule: Monthly
- Format: Limited series
- Genre: Science fiction, superhero
- Publication date: (vol. 1); May 2000 – April 2001 (vol. 2); September 2011 – January 2013
- No. of issues: (vol. 1): 12 (vol. 2): 16 & 0 (as of March 2013)
- Main character(s): (vol. 1); Legion of Super-Heroes; Kwai (vol. 2); Legion of Super-Heroes

Creative team
- Written by: (vol. 1); Dan Abnett & Andy Lanning (vol. 2); Fabian Nicieza; Tom DeFalco
- Penciller(s): (vol. 1); Oliver Coipel; Pascal Alike (vol. 2); Pete Woods
- Inker: Andy Lanning
- Letterer: Comicraft
- Colorist(s): (vol. 1); Tom McCraw (vol. 2); Brad Anderson
- Editor: Mike McAvennie

Legion Lost is the name of two superhero titles published by DC Comics, both starring the Legion of Super-Heroes. The first series was a 12-issue comic book limited series co-written by Dan Abnett and Andy Lanning, often collectively referred to and interviewed as "DnA", penciled primarily by Oliver Coipel, with Pascal Alixe filling in for some issues, inked by Lanning, and colored by Tom McCraw. The second series was created as part of DC's New 52 relaunch.

== Publication history ==
Initially, the "Legion Lost" series, together with its companion "Legion Worlds", was to serve as an entry point for the Legion franchise. In keeping with this, the series centers around a specific set of Legionnaires, with each issue told from the perspective of another. It is the third installment in the Abnett and Lanning Legion series, following the events of "Legion of the Damned" and "Widening Rifts," and was succeeded by "Legion Worlds" and a new series titled "The Legion". The series, which ran for 12 issues from 2000 to 2001, was later collected into a hardcover edition in 2011.

In September 2011, DC Comics launched a new monthly series (Legion Lost (vol. 2)). The series replaced Adventure Comics as the second Legion title published by DC Comics as part of The New 52 and focuses on a small group of the original incarnation of Legion of the Super-Heroes (and Earth-247 Legionnaire Gates) as they are stranded in the 21st century, having failed to stop a shape-shifting terrorist from infecting Earth with a deadly virus. The series follows the changing rules of time travel since the events of Flashpoint, where time travel is more difficult. The title's final issue, #16, was published in January 2013.

== Volume 1 ==
=== Plot ===
Following the destruction of the Legion Outpost base by a tear in the fabric of space, Saturn Girl, Brainiac 5.1, Chameleon, Umbra, Kid Quantum, Live Wire, Apparition, and Monstress find themselves lost on the far side of the universe. They are discovered by Shikari, an insect-like alien, whose people are being hunted by an alien race known as "The Progeny". Later on, the group is also joined by their teammate "ERG-1" (who soon takes the name Wildfire after Shikari mistakenly calls him that), who had been sucked into the rift prior to the other Legionnaires; with Shikari and her tracking power acting as their guide, they start looking for ways to get home. As they cross the galaxy, the Legion discovers that the Progeny have been actively slaughtering entire species in genocide, inspired by their radical belief that they are the "perfect" life form.

It is revealed that Saturn Girl has been repeatedly "manipulating" the team's minds with her psychic powers. While she claims she was trying to keep the team levelheaded and calm, the revelation that Apparition was merely a psychic illusion designed to pacify Ultra Boy turned the group against Saturn Girl. Saturn Girl's actions are discovered after she forces herself into Umbra's head and unknowingly creates two psychic entities: one representing the totality of Umbra's darkest fears and one that represents Saturn Girl's own psyche run amuck. Both entities are defeated, and Saturn Girl is ultimately forgiven.

During the course of the series, two additional mysteries haunt the Legionnaires: the fate of Element Lad, who went through the rift along with his teammates but vanished after placing them in crystals designed to protect them while traveling through the rift; and the identity of "The Progenitor", the supreme leader of the Progeny. In the end, the Legionnaires are captured and taken to the Progenitor, who is revealed to be an insane Element Lad. Element Lad explains that in trying to save the team as they came through the rift, he was cast back to the beginning of time and that he has now lived for over a billion years. Element Lad used his powers to create life forms, culminating in his believing himself "God", and his creation, the Progeny, as his most perfect creation. Realizing that their friend is insane, they confront him, during which he murders Monstress after she acknowledges that she is not one of his creations.

A battle erupts, and the Legion eventually escapes by way of a dimensional gateway Element Lad possesses—the hard light pyramid they had discovered earlier. As they escape, Element Lad merges with the Omniphagos and attacks the Legion's ship. Live Wire kills Element Lad, but is killed in the ensuing blast.

=== Aftermath ===
The fallout from the events of Legion Lost would be felt in The Legion #30–33, Abnett and Lanning's final four issues of the series. Singularity would rally the entire galaxy against the remaining members of the Progeny, who would find themselves hunted by their former victims and systematically wiped out by them. The surviving members of the species would find a shocking ally in Live Wire, who was resurrected as a humanoid crystal entity. Live Wire contacted the Legion, which convinced Singularity to spare the Progeny and stop the cycle of violence. With help from the original Legion and the Earth-Prime Legion, Live Wire would have his original body restored in Final Crisis: Legion of 3 Worlds.

== Volume 2 / The New 52 ==
The second series, part of The New 52, depicts seven Legionnaires (Chameleon Girl, Dawnstar, Gates, Timber Wolf, Tellus, Tyroc, and Wildfire) from the post-Infinite Crisis "Retroboot" Legion trapped in the twenty-first century pursuing a villain who released a pathogen. The series was cancelled with issue #16.

Legion Lost: Run from Tomorrow

When the team arrives in the 21st century, their technology does not work as intended. They had been chasing Alastor, who has released the mutagenic Hypertaxis pathogen. Timber Wolf quickly apprehends Alastor, who has destroyed a small town; however, as the team attempts to return to their own time, their Time Bubble malfunctions due to the pathogen transforming Alastor. Gates attempts to teleport himself and Alastor away, but Chameleon Girl is accidentally teleported along with Gates and Alastor and presumed dead. During a town memorial service for those killed in Alastor's attack, the Legion confronts a doctor who was exposed to the pathogen. Having been transformed into living energy, he refuses to accept his new form and commits suicide.

Timber Wolf then interrupts a fight between two creatures exposed to the pathogen and learns that one of them is an infected Chameleon Girl. While attempting to contain Chameleon Girl, Wildfire, Tyroc, and Timber Wolf are ambushed by the Black Razors. Meanwhile, Tellus and Dawnstar locate Alastor and try to reason with him. After Tyroc incapacitates the Black Razors, they go ahead and help the others with Alastor. Tellus defeats Alastor with a telepathic assault. Gates returns, although half of his body is scarred. Timber Wolf and Chameleon Girl are confronted by Martian Manhunter, who renders Timber Wolf unconscious, letting the military agents arrest them. The others attempt to break into the military installation to save their friends. Manhunter helps the team and heals Chameleon Girl once he realizes they are heroes from the future.

Legion Lost: The Culling

In "The Culling", the Legion are dropped into battle with the Teen Titans; initially, they believe each other to be enemies, but they end up teaming up to escape Harvest, who uses technology from the Legion's time. The team recognizes Bart Allen, who is apparently a criminal in the future. Chameleon Girl is revealed to be an agent of Echo, a branch of the Science Police, with a secret mission in the present. Tellus is revealed to know the Hypertaxis pathogen would essentially become inert in the present time. Harvest also claims that he manipulated the Legion into sending them back in time. After fighting with Harvest, the team finds a Time Bubble, which they use to return to their time.

Responding to a beacon, the Legion finds a member of the Science Police, Nathaniel Adym, who has come to the present to assign a new mission to the team. In the same moment, Wildfire crashes down from the sky, and the team is attacked by Daggor, who plants a world-killer machine. Lacking firepower, Adym sends a distress signal to Echo agent Jocelyn Lure, who arrives with Superboy, Caitlin Fairchild, and Ridge. Harvest and his henchmen arrive to fight Daggor, as well as activating a hypnotic trigger on Superboy, making him go out of control. Adym plans to use his Time Bubble to travel back an hour and set off a bomb, which would destroy half of the continent but stop Daggor's machine and save the future. Gates and his past self work together to send Daggor, Thrax, and Adym's bomb into a distant sun.

=== Aftermath ===
The Legionnaires are stranded in the 21st century until Brainiac 5 calls them to battle Infinitus in Justice League United. At the end of the story, the group returns to the 31st century.
