= Gates (character) =

Character from the DC Universe

- Gates as depicted in Legion of Super-Heroes vol. 4 #92 (May 1997). Art by Lee Moder (penciler), Ron Boyd (inker), and Tom McCraw (colorist).

Publication information
- Publisher: DC Comics
- First appearance: Legion of Super-Heroes (vol. 4) #66 (March 1995)
- Created by: Tom McCraw; Mark Waid; Lee Moder

In-story information
- Alter ego: Ti'julk Mr'asz (phonetic approximation)
- Species: Vyrgan
- Place of origin: Vyrga
- Team affiliations: Legion of Super-Heroes
- Abilities: Teleportation via circular "gates"

Gates (Ti'julk Mr'asz) is a fictional character and member of the Legion of Super-Heroes in the DC Universe. Like all natives of the planet Vyrga, Gates has a largely insectoid body. He is also noted for his strong political views, tending towards socialism.

Gates was created by Tom McCraw, Mark Waid, and Lee Moder, and first appeared in Legion of Super-Heroes (vol. 4) #66 (March 1995).

== Fictional character biography ==
Gates is an insectoid alien who was drafted by his planetary government to represent them in the Legion, whom he perceived as being militaristic and inherently fascist. He is one of the few free-thinkers on his homeworld, the rest being unindividualistic conformists.

Like many of the Legionnaires who were introduced in post-Zero Hour continuity, Gates does not appear in the "Threeboot" continuity. Gates reappears in Final Crisis: Legion of 3 Worlds, where he is tasked with bringing Brainiac 5 to the Fortress of Solitude.

In The New 52 continuity reboot, Gates appears in Legion Lost, where he and several other Legionnaires are trapped in the 21st century. He was thought killed in the accident that stranded the Legionnaires in the past, but in fact survived, though injured.

== Powers and abilities ==
Gates has the ability to create glowing green, circular teleportation "gates", which people and objects can travel freely through to emerge from a partner gate at a location he defines. The portals have been shown to have sharp edges; he accidentally severed Ra's al Ghul's arm once while teleporting.

As a member of the Legion of Super-Heroes, Gates is provided a Legion Flight Ring, which allows him to fly and protects him from the vacuum of space and other dangerous environments.

== In other media ==
- Gates appears in Adventures in the DC Universe #10.
- Gates makes a cameo appearance in Legion of Super-Heroes.
