= Starbreaker (character) =

- Starbreaker (background) on the cover of Justice League of America #96 (February 1972), art by Dick Dillin.

Publication information
- Publisher: DC Comics
- First appearance: Justice League of America #96 (February 1972)
- Created by: Mike Friedrich (writer); Dick Dillin (artist)

In-story information
- Abilities: Energy Form: Energy absorption and manipulation Genius intellect Humanoid Form: Physical enhancement Flight; Energy projection and manipulation Illusion generation Emotional Vampirism

Starbreaker is a fictional character that appears in comic books published by DC Comics. The character first appeared in Justice League of America #96 (February 1972), and was created by Mike Friedrich and Dick Dillin.

== Publication history ==
Starbreaker debuted in a three-part storyline that ran in Justice League of America #96-98 (February–May 1972). The first chapter, "The Coming of Starbreaker" introduced the foe; the second, "The Day the Earth Screams", featured the origin story of the Justice League and the final chapter "No More Tomorrows", featured Sargon the Sorcerer, who aids the League in defeating the villain. The character did not appear in DC Comics continuity again until featured in a four-part storyline in Justice League America #62-65 (May–August 1992). Starbreaker eventually returned, revealed to be the mastermind behind a planet abduction in Adam Strange (vol. 2) #1-8 (November 2004-June 2005) before a reappearance in Justice League of America (vol. 2) #29-34 (March–August 2009).

== Fictional character biography ==
Three members of the Justice League of America - Flash, Green Lantern, and Hawkman - are diverted from a return trip to Earth by Adam Strange. Tracing a faint transmission from Green Lantern, Superman joins the heroes on the planet Rann. Strange has enlisted their aid to defeat Starbreaker, who is intent on destroying Rann and consuming its energy. Although Starbreaker splits into three copies that begin the process, the villain is defeated by Strange and the Justice Leaguers. Intent on vengeance, Starbreaker attacks Earth, initially defeating Superman, Green Lantern and the Flash. The entire Justice League gathers, and after being spurred on by Hawkman, defeat Starbreaker with the aid of Sargon the Sorcerer. Starbreaker is incarcerated by the Guardians of the Universe.

Starbreaker escapes and conquers the planet Almerac, intent on devouring its energies. Another version of the Justice League oppose Starbreaker, with Blue Beetle using Booster Gold's armor to absorb Starbreaker's energy.

Sh'ri Valkyr, a Thanagarian commander, resuscitates Starbreaker, providing him with victims and allowing him to regain a corporeal form. Valkyr plans to use Rann's teleportation technology - the Zeta-Beam - to convert the entire universe into energy to feed Starbreaker. With the help of the Omega Men and L.E.G.I.O.N., Adam Strange strands Starbreaker in an empty universe devoid of energy. Before being killed, Valkyr retaliates by teleporting Rann to Polaris, home system of the planet Thanagar, beginning the Rann-Thanagar War.

Starbreaker returns in an incorporeal form, intent on destroying the Justice League. He uses the villain Shadow Thief as a pawn and locates an entity with enough energy to sustain his form for many years. Starbreaker is revealed to be an adult Sun-Eater and engages the League in combat. He is weakened by Doctor Light and Firestorm, then shot by Paladin, an alternative version of Batman. Although Starbreaker dissolves, the League acknowledge the defeat is temporary and that Starbreaker will reform.

Starbreaker is the main antagonist in the 2025 storyline "The Starbreaker Supremacy", where he allies with Nathan Broome in an attempt to destroy the emotional spectrum.

== Powers and abilities ==
Starbreaker is initially presented as a humanoid energy vampire with exceptional strength and durability; and capable of flight, energy projection and creating illusions. Starbreaker can also be empowered by draining negative emotions such as hatred and fear from other beings. Starbreaker is eventually revealed to be an adult Sun-Eater, which requires large amounts of energy to survive. As an energy entity, Starbreaker is susceptible to devices capable of draining energy, which disperse his body.
