= Justice League United =

DC Comics superhero team

- Cover of Justice League United #0.

Group publication information
- Publisher: DC Comics
- First appearance: Justice League United #0 (April 2014)
- Created by: Jeff Lemire; Mike McKone

In-story information
- Base(s): Moosonee, Ontario

Roster
- See: List of members

Justice League United

Series publication information
- Schedule: Monthly
- Format: Ongoing series
- Genre: Superhero
- Publication date: April 2014 – December 2015
- Number of issues: 19 (0-16, plus a Futures End One-Shot, and 1 annual, as of December 2015 cover date)
- Creator(s): Jeff Lemire; Mike McKone

Justice League United or JLU, are a team of superheroes appearing in American comic books published by DC Comics. The team was created by Jeff Lemire and Mike McKone. First appearing in their eponymous series, Justice League United #0 (published in April 2014 and cover-dated June 2014), the team features Animal Man, Equinox, Green Arrow, Martian Manhunter, Stargirl, Supergirl, Adam Strange and his partner Alanna Lewis. The team forms in the aftermath of "Forever Evil", following the disbandment of the government-sanctioned Justice League of America.

== Publication history ==
Justice League United began its development in the summer 2013 after "Forever Evil" was to be finished during its run at the time. Writer Jeff Lemire and artist Mike McKone were assigned in taking over Justice League of America, with the series being retitled Justice League Canada, as the series was to take place in Canada. Adam Strange and a brand new character of Canadian origin were expected to join the team.

Animal Man became a part of the team, when his eponymous solo title was canceled in December, which was also written by Lemire.

Justice League of America was instead relaunched in April 2014 as Justice League United with a zero-issue. The team's Canadian addition was revealed to be Miiyahbin Marten, a 16-year-old Cree teen from Moose Factory with the codename Equinox. Her powers stem from the Earth and change with the seasons.

Jeff Parker took over as writer with issue 11. DC canceled the series with issue 16 in December 2015, with news outlets citing low sales as the most likely cause of cancellation.

== Team roster ==
- Adam Strange
- Alanna
- Animal Man
- Batgirl (Barbara Gordon)
- Equinox
- Etrigan the Demon
- Green Arrow
- Hawkman (Katar Hol)
- Katana
- Martian Manhunter
- Mera
- Poison Ivy
- Robotman
- Stargirl
- Supergirl
- Swamp Thing (Alec Holland)
- Vandal Savage
- Vibe

== Collected editions ==
Title	Material collected	Published date	ISBN
Justice League United Vol. 1: Justice League Canada	Justice League United #0-5	March 2015	978-1401252359
Justice League United Vol. 2: The Infinitus Saga	Justice League United #7-10, Annual #1, Justice League United: Futures End #1 and Justice League: Futures End #1	December 2015	978-1401257668

Justice League United Vol. 3: Reunited was solicited as collecting Justice League United #11-16 and DC Sneak Peek: Justice League United, but was cancelled and never published.
