= Sinestro =

Supervillain in the DC Comics Universe

- Sinestro as depicted in Green Lantern Corps (vol. 2) #56 (January 2011); Art by Tyler Kirkham.

Publication information
- Publisher: DC Comics
- First appearance: Green Lantern (vol. 2) #7 (August 1961)
- Created by: John Broome; Gil Kane

In-story information
- Full name: Thaal Sinestro
- Species: Korugarian
- Place of origin: Korugar
- Team affiliations: Sinestro Corps; Legion of Doom; Injustice League; Secret Society of Super Villains; Anti-Justice League; Green Lantern Corps
- Notable aliases: Green Lantern, Yellow Lantern, Parallax
- Abilities: Genius-level intellect; Expert strategist and tactician; Skilled hand-to-hand combatant; Innate understanding of the fears and phobias of others; Power ring (typically yellow/green variety); Generation of hard light constructs; Energy projection; Flight; Personal forcefield; Enhanced strength, speed, and durability; Space travel; Limited cellular regeneration; Real-time translation of all languages; Fear empowerment

Thaal Sinestro (/sɪˈnɛstroʊ/) (or simply Sinestro) is a supervillain appearing in American comic books published by DC Comics, particularly those featuring Green Lantern. Created by John Broome and Gil Kane, Sinestro is a former Green Lantern Corps member who was dishonorably discharged for abusing his power. He has since endured as the archenemy of the superhero Green Lantern and is the founder of the Sinestro Corps.

Sinestro has appeared in various forms of non-comics media including shows, films, and video games. Ted Levine, Miguel Ferrer, Xander Berkeley, Ron Perlman, Victor Garber, Jason Isaacs, and others have voiced the character in animated television series and films. The character made his live-action film debut in the 2011 film Green Lantern, played by Mark Strong, and is currently portrayed by Ulrich Thomsen in the DC Universe, beginning with the series Lanterns.

== Publication history ==
Sinestro, during his debut in Green Lantern (vol. 2) #7 (August 1961). Art by Gil Kane

Sinestro was created by John Broome and Gil Kane, and first appeared in Green Lantern (vol. 2) #7 (August 1961). According to Kane, his appearance was modeled after British actor David Niven.

In 2009, IGN ranked Sinestro as the 15th-greatest comic book villain of all time.

== Fictional character biography ==
=== Green Lantern ===
Sinestro was born on the planet Korugar in space sector 1417. His dedication to preserving order originally manifests in his previous career, an anthropologist specializing in the reconstruction of ancient Korugan civilizations. One day, Green Lantern Prohl Gosgotha crash-lands near him, injured and apparently dying. Prohl gives his ring to Sinestro, who barely understands what to do with it before coming under attack from the Lantern's pursuer: a Weaponer of Qward. In the end, Sinestro has to destroy the ruins he was restoring to crush the Qwardian. Afterwards, Gosgotha turns out to still be alive and asks for his ring back so he can summon help. Addicted to the ring's power, Sinestro lets him die and convinces the Guardians that the ring chose him as Gosgotha's successor.

When Hal Jordan joins the Green Lantern Corps, Sinestro, now a seasoned and respected Lantern, is assigned to be his instructor. Jordan is horrified at Sinestro's methods, though Sinestro maintains that he is only doing what he considers necessary to protect Korugar. During his training, Jordan helps Sinestro repel an attempted invasion by the Khunds. When Jordan disobeys orders and contacts the Lanterns for help, Sinestro's dictatorship is exposed, and he is forced to appear before the Guardians for punishment. Katma Tui, the leader of a Korugarian resistance movement who feels that Sinestro's "protection" keeps her people from growing as a society through contact with other alien races, is recruited as his replacement in the Corps. Tui eventually grows into one of the most respected Green Lanterns, but she and the rest of Korugar initially resists her appointment to the Corps. Due to Sinestro's actions, Korugar has come to consider the symbol of the Green Lantern Corps an emblem of terror and oppression.

=== Punishment and villainy ===
Sinestro, as he was initially depicted prior to forming his namesake Corps. Art by Gil Kane and Joe Giella

For using the power of the Green Lantern to instill fear rather than combat it, the Guardians banish Sinestro to the antimatter universe, a counterpart to the "real" universe made up of negative matter. Sinestro ends up on the antimatter world of Qward, the counterpart of the Guardians' homeworld Oa, which is ruled by the Weaponers of Qward, a race of warriors and scientists that bear a fierce hatred of the Guardians and all Green Lanterns. By exiling Sinestro to a world ruled by evil beings who specifically hate Green Lanterns, the Guardians hope to humble him. However, Sinestro is quick to seize the opportunity, persuading the Weaponers that he can use his knowledge of the Corps to destroy them for good.

Creating a yellow power ring for Sinestro to use, the Weaponers send him back to the "positive matter" universe to seek revenge. Sinestro quickly becomes the Green Lantern Corps' most powerful nemesis, partially due to a weakness in their power rings that prevent them from directly affecting the color yellow. Despite this, skilled Green Lanterns like Jordan, Sinestro's most hated enemy, always find ways to defeat him.

=== Pre-Crisis ===
Sinestro first meets Hal Jordan after already making an alliance with Qward; the latter had already beaten the Weaponers three times. Sinestro takes him to Qward and is able to imprison him in a yellow bubble by threatening to kill 100,000 innocent people. Jordan uses his ring to create the illusion that it is nearly out of power. After releasing Jordan from the bubble to eliminate him, Sinestro is defeated and imprisoned in a specially constructed cell by Jordan, who does not take him back to his universe as it would go against the jurisdiction of the Guardians. By gradually sapping the cell's power, Sinestro escapes and continues to menace Jordan. He tries to attack the Guardians after kidnapping Jordan and assuming his identity to occupy a meeting of Green Lanterns and absorb power from their rings by casting an illusion of an attacking monster. However, Jordan escapes and defeats Sinestro, who is placed in a new prison empowered by the rings of hundreds of Lanterns, so he cannot drain it. However, Sinestro anticipates this and uses a backup yellow ring hidden in his boot to escape.

=== Post-Crisis ===
Before the Guardians take a leave of absence from their universe to attempt mating with their female counterparts, the Zamarons, they construct an inescapable prison for Sinestro and thousands of others on Oa. Sinestro escapes himself through the mental manipulation of the Mad God of Sector 3600. Wielding nearly unlimited power, Sinestro murders entire star systems until he is subdued by the Green Lantern Corps. Guilty of multiple acts of genocide, Sinestro is put on trial again by the assembled membership of the Green Lantern Corps. Finding him guilty, they condemn him to death and execute him. Sinestro manages to cheat death by sending his essence into the Central Power Battery and shutting it down. While in the Battery, he also makes a startling discovery about the ancient weakness to yellow within the Green Lanterns' light.

Hal Jordan enters the Battery in an attempt to restore the powers of his fellow Lanterns and ultimately defeats Sinestro, whose spirit is condemned to remain trapped inside the Central Battery, powerless, for eternity. Yet Sinestro earns an even greater personal victory as the so-called "yellow impurity" turns out to be Parallax, the embodiment of fear.

=== Mosaic ===
While John Stewart is on Oa, the spirit of Sinestro is absorbed into Stewart's power ring during the reactivation of the Central Power Battery. He tortures and subjugates Stewart's consciousness to seize control of his body. Under Sinestro's influence, Stewart wreaks havoc on Mosaic World. He attacks the builders and threatens those close to Stewart, including Rose Hardin and her son, Toby. Stewart manages to fight back from within his mind by summoning mental projections of his allies from the Green Lantern Corps for emotional support. The possession finally breaks when Toby attacks Stewart, causing Sinestro to flee Stewart's body.

=== Parallax ===
In the meantime, the return of the Guardians results in the Corps being re-established. The newly restored Corps is short-lived, thanks to the efforts of Mongul and Hank Henshaw. Mongul and Henshaw use several nuclear devices to destroy Coast City, Hal Jordan's hometown. Driven mad with grief, Jordan is possessed by Parallax and wipes out most of the Green Lantern Corps. As a last-ditch effort to halt Jordan's rampage, the Guardians free Sinestro from the Central Power Battery and send him to stop Jordan. After a battle, Jordan snaps Sinestro's neck, apparently killing him.

=== Return ===
Sinestro is revealed to have survived when Kyle Rayner discovers the existence of Parallax and reveals it to Green Arrow and the Justice League. Nearly killing the two heroes, Sinestro is stopped by the newly resurrected Hal Jordan, who reclaims his ring and is purged of Parallax's influence. The two fight to a draw, with Sinestro escaping to the antimatter universe when Jordan damages his ring.

Sinestro later appears in the mini-series Villains United, in which he captures Lady Quark for the Secret Society of Super Villains, a group of which Sinestro previously was a member. Here, he plays a major role in the Society's massacre of the Freedom Fighters, who are investigating the meeting place of other villains, but walk into an ambush. Sinestro kills Black Condor, then defeats Uncle Sam, leaving him for dead.

=== Sinestro Corps ===
After the Battle of Metropolis, Sinestro retreats to the antimatter universe, allies with the Anti-Monitor, and embraces the doctrine of spreading fear. The Green Lantern Corps is once again reformed with the return of Hal Jordan so Sinestro decides to found the Sinestro Corps, offering yellow power rings to the most feared and savage warriors of the universe. He is also revealed to have masterminded the death of Kyle Rayner's mother by having Despotellis infect her as part of a plot to break Rayner's will and make him Parallax's latest host.

The Sinestro Corps War begins with an attack on Oa. Sinestro returns to Korugar to confront his successor, Soranik Natu. Sinestro defeats her, but makes it appear she has defeated him. This will force her to stay on Korugar to fulfill her responsibilities as "the Savior of Korugar".

Sinestro returns to Qward and joins the battle occurring there. He confronts Earth's Green Lanterns, and upon their escape, follows them toward Earth, the Sinestro Corps' real target. The Sinestro Corps begin attacking Earth. Sinestro reveals to Hal, Guy Gardner, and John Stewart that he intends to turn Earth into the new homeworld for the Sinestro Corps. During the battle, the Guardians enacted new laws to the Book of Oa. The first new law was to give the Green Lanterns the ability to use lethal force. Sinestro claims he has achieved his overall goal because now the Green Lanterns spread fear by being unchecked. Hal Jordan and Kyle Rayner beat Sinestro in hand-to-hand combat. Sinestro is imprisoned in Oa's Sciencells, where he learns from Hal Jordan that he has received a death penalty. Despite his personal defeat, Sinestro claims victory. Sinestro's overall goal through his war was to groom his former Corps for a more active, forceful role in the universe. With the enactment of the Corps' new laws and the approval of lethal force, the Green Lantern corps will inspire fear, creating the same effect as the Sinestro Corps: order through fear. With the hunt for the members of the Sinestro Corps becoming one of the Green Lantern Corps' highest priorities, many of those who wield yellow power rings have been incarcerated in Oa's Sciencells.

=== Rage of the Red Lanterns ===
Sinestro is to be executed on his homeworld of Korugar. During the transport, a group of Sinestro Corps members attempt to free him. Atrocitus and his Red Lanterns intervene by attacking both Corps and kidnapping Sinestro. In the midst of the battle, Saint Walker tells Hal Jordan that Sinestro's survival is crucial to stopping the Blackest Night. After being taken to Ysmault, he is nailed to a cross to await his execution at the hands of Atrocitus, who wishes to make Sinestro suffer by taking revenge on everything he cares for. His targets include Korugar and Sinestro's hidden daughter. Sinestro escapes and goes back to his home world to see to family business.

=== War of Light ===
After escaping the assault by the Red Lanterns, Sinestro finally reaches his homeworld of Korugar. After incapacitating Iolande, he confronts Soranik Natu and reveals that she is his daughter. He informs Soranik that his wife took her as a child and left him as he began his rise to power on Korugar. He was eventually able to locate his daughter and give her the mark on her face, his family's coat of arms, along with a micro-transmitter so he could locate her. He visited Soranik throughout her life using his ring to alter his appearance. He even took a picture of her and the Natus at her medical school graduation. Sinestro then says that he is proud of his daughter for succeeding where he could not, namely bringing order to Korugar as a member of the Green Lantern Corps. He then tells her that they must work together to stop the Blackest Night. After leaving Korugar, Sinestro visits Abin Sur's grave and plans to attack the Star Sapphires' homeworld Zamaron.

=== Blackest Night ===
When Sinestro arrives on Zamaron, he first encounters Carol Ferris. While Sinestro holds no ill will towards Carol and only wishes to free his Corpswomen from Zamaron, he warns Carol that he will hurt her if she stands in his way. Carol then encases Sinestro in a crystal structure, forcing him to relive the death of his love, Arin Sur (Abin Sur's sister). Angered by this, Sinestro bursts free, staggering Carol enough for his Corpsmen to seize her. However, before he can capitalize on the advantage, the Black Lanterns invade, led by Amon Sur. Hal Jordan and Indigo-1 then appear, initially fighting off some of the Black Lanterns. Indigo-1 teleports the group to Korugar so that Sinestro can confront Mongul. Sinestro defeats Mongul by overriding his rings, then imprisons him within the Yellow Central Battery. Sinestro vows to keep Mongul alive (and torture him), then kill him when the Blackest Night is over. He also proclaims himself to be "leading this coalition" against the Black Lanterns. The Sinestro Corps' celebration is cut short when a ship crash lands nearby, containing Black Lanterns Abin and Arin Sur.

As the Black Lanterns attack, Arin emotionally manipulates Sinestro before Hal Jordan, Abin Sur, and Carol rescue him. With all four in place, they destroy Abin's and Arin's rings. Afterward, Jordan and Sinestro debate whether to contact the Blue or Red Lanterns, respectively. Jordan then makes the decision himself. Sinestro relents, tells his Corps that there is a temporary truce with the Green Lanterns, and travels with the others to Odym. After gathering the other Corps leaders, Sinestro and the others follow the Black Lantern battery to Earth, where Nekron has already risen. Under Indigo-1's direction, they combine their lights, thinking it will destroy the Black Lanterns' source of power, but this fails and in an attempt to bolster their ranks, Ganthet duplicates the Corps leaders' rings, having them seek out candidates to deputize. Sinestro's ring chooses the Scarecrow. The Black Lantern Spectre then attacks the group. To defeat it, Jordan releases Parallax from its prison, intending to let it possess him again. Sinestro offers to join with Parallax instead, but is rebuffed. When the restored Spectre manages to separate Parallax from Jordan, Sinestro again tries to claim the fear entity as his own, but is foiled after an unknown force pulls Parallax away.

During the battle, Nekron kills a Guardian and uses its blood to summon the Life Entity, the embodiment of the universe's life force, from within Earth. Outraged at the Guardians' need for control, Sinestro stabs Ganthet with his ring. Hal Jordan realizes the Entity needs a mind to guide it and prepares to fly in, but Sinestro does so himself, taking the Entity's power.

Later, Sinestro is apparently killed by Nekron, but revived by the White Entity, claiming to be in harmony with every living being in the universe and thus reborn as the true Guardian of the Universe. However, Sinestro is unable to fully control the Entity's power, and Nekron is able to separate them. Hal then comes to the realization that, even though Nekron allowed the various resurrections of the heroes he transformed into Black Lanterns, it was they who chose to live again. This enables Hal Jordan to access the Entity's power and transform himself and the other heroes into White Lanterns, resurrecting Black Hand and breaking Nekron's tether to the living universe.

=== War of the Green Lanterns ===
In the Brightest Day crossover, Sinestro discovers a white power battery in a crater on Earth. In the first issue of the "New Guardians" story arc, Sinestro reveals that the white power battery wants Hal Jordan. He and the other Corps leaders must pursue Krona, who is trying to capture all of the emotional entities. Sinestro must also work with Kyle Rayner and the Green Lantern Corps in an effort to rescue Soranik Natu from a Qwardian who made Sinestro's original yellow ring.

In the War of the Green Lanterns storyline, Lyssa Drak traps Sinestro and the other 'New Guardians' in the Book of the Black while trying to recover the emotional entities from Krona. Hal Jordan alone is able to avoid the book and escapes with the other New Guardians' rings. He later uses Sinestro's ring when Parallax is returned to the Central Power Battery, allowing Krona to control all Green Lanterns. Jordan and others escaped only thanks to their prior experience with Parallax granting them an immunity to the initial assault, to give himself a weapon against the other Lanterns. While attempting to escape the Book which forces the New Guardians to re-live their lives prior to acquiring their current rings, Sinestro discovers Indigo-1 in a prison cell, angrily proclaiming that she will escape whatever Abin Sur has planned for her, although he chooses to focus on his own escape rather than remain to question her more about this, only for Krona to burn the page that Sinestro is on before he can escape. Sinestro and the others are later freed by Kyle Rayner, who 'draws' their escape. Sinestro's ring attempts to return to him, but is overridden by Krona, who wields all seven varieties of power rings. As Jordan battles Krona, Sinestro hears him as he declares his dedication to the cause of the Green Lanterns and is inspired to join his old enemy in battle. As he fights Krona, a green power ring comes to him, making Sinestro a Green Lantern once more.

=== The New 52 ===
In September 2011, The New 52 rebooted DC's continuity. In this new timeline, Sinestro is angry that he has a Green Lantern power ring. The Guardians of the Universe state that the ring wishes to redeem him. With the aid of Hal Jordan, Sinestro returns to his home world of Korugar and liberates his people from the out-of-control Sinestro Corps, although his people are still afraid. Disabling his former group by rendering them comatose, he heads back out into space with the intent of shutting down the entire Sinestro Corps.

Later, he witnesses the prophecy of the Guardians' plans for a "Third Army" and once again retrieves Jordan from Earth. However, he is captured by the Indigo Tribe and is forcibly bound to an Indigo ring. Jordan convinces the Tribe that he can help Sinestro atone for his past deeds without being bound to an Indigo Ring.

The two then retrieve the Book of the Black to glean information about the future, but it inadvertently takes them to Black Hand. Elsewhere, the Guardians discuss how they willed Jordan's ring to claim Sinestro to undermine all the other Corps, especially his own. Black Hand engages Sinestro and Jordan in combat, whereupon the Guardians arrive and command Black Hand to kill both Green Lanterns. As their life is drained, Jordan and Sinestro fuse their rings together and send off the resulting ring to get help. Soon after, Jordan and Sinestro are banished to the Dead Zone.

They wander the Dead Zone searching for a way to escape and encounter the deceased Tomar-Re. He asks Sinestro and Jordan to stop Volthoom, the First Lantern. When Simon Baz enters the Dead Zone during a fight with Black Hand, a way out is provided by Green Lantern B'dg. Sinestro reclaims the green ring and exits the Dead Zone with Baz. Sinestro travels to Korugar to rally support against Volthoom, but Volthoom attacks and destroys Korugar.

When Kyle Rayner and Carol Ferris arrive at Korugar's remains, Sinestro attacks, but immediately notices that Rayner is now a White Lantern. Sinestro demands that Rayner restores Korugar, but Rayner is unable to do so. Sinestro takes the white ring to become a White Lantern himself, but it rejects him, to his horror. He then claims the yellow power battery instead and leaves to exact revenge, as he becomes a member of the Sinestro Corps again.

He arrives on the planet Oa and strikes Volthoom, but their battle is interrupted by the Indigo Tribe. The Tribe opens a portal to the Dead Zone, allowing Hal Jordan to escape as a Black Lantern. Volthoom engages Jordan and reality begins to unravel. Sinestro turns to the Yellow Central Power Battery and releases Parallax, becoming its new host to attack Volthoom with heightened power levels. Volthoom is ultimately defeated when Jordan summons Nekron.

Afterwards, Sinestro reactivates his Sinestro Corps and heads off to kill the Guardians for all the harm that they have caused. Jordan attempts to talk Sinestro out of this course of action to save him from himself. However, it was too late as Sinestro reveals that he had already killed the Guardians before Jordan intercepted him. Sinestro vanishes and leaves Arkillo in charge of the Sinestro Corps. Reappearing elsewhere, Sinestro secretly brings Ganthet and Sayd together, stating that he knows what it is like to lose everything, but exiles them both from Oa.

After rescuing a group of pods containing some Korugarians from the servants of the Pale Vicars, Sinestro and Lyssa Drak head to the refuge of the Sinestro Corps. Arkillo currently leads the Yellow Lanterns as the Arkillo Corps and has Soranik Natu as his captive. He and his Lanterns attack Sinestro who manages to defeat them. He forces Arkillo to yield and kills a Yellow Lantern who tries to attack him from behind as he said that Sinestro must die, melting his ring to stop it from finding a replacement. With his leadership retained, Sinestro sends Arkillo to the infirmary and Soranik argues with him, believing he had her captured. Refuting this, Sinestro shows her the Korugarians he saved and asks her to help them. Sinestro creates an elite team to personally serve him and has them aid himself in taking Necroplis as the new planet for the Korugarians and the moon for the Sinestro Corps. Returning to his base of operations to prepare for the move to Necropolis, Sinestro and Soranik meet with the recently awakened Korugarians who voice their distrust of Sinestro despite his intentions. Sinestro brings a Green Lantern Power Battery for Soranik to recharge and she joins his team in rescuing a group of Korugarians that are being sold into slavery on the planet Muz.

=== DC Rebirth ===
Subsequently, in DC Rebirth, Warworld transports to the ruins of Oa, while Sinestro plans to control the universe. When Sinestro senses the spectrum of green light, he enters the core with Parallax. He possesses the fear entity of Parallax again and returns to his youth. He sends out his enforcers of his Corps to control the new order of the universe with fear.

When Sinestro is stunned that his Corps have reports that Hal Jordan has returned and attacks the Corps, his daughter, Soranik Natu rebels against her father, saying that he should take responsibility for his failures and that he will never learn from the Green Lantern Corps. Later, Sinestro alliances with the priests of the Sacrament, who are an enemy of the Green Lantern Corps, who reconsider him to aiding enforcement controls of the Vega system. His Corps has captured Green Lantern Guy Gardner instead of Jordan. Sinestro is furious and demands to know where Jordan is, but he learns that Soranik has secured Jordan safely. Sinestro then uses the imprisoned people in Warworld's engine to increase the power of fear for his Corps, while he tries to interrogate Gardner to where the Green Lantern Corps are.

Later, Sinestro feels he is in jeopardy now that the Green Lantern Corps have returned, including the fact that his daughter, Soranik, has rejected his Corps. He increases his Parallax powers to one thousand percent when Hal Jordan returns and invades Warworld. Sinestro orders his Corps to stop intervening in his personal fight against Jordan and confronts his former pupil face to face. During the battle, Sinestro discovers too late that his powers have decreased due to Soranik rescuing the people that were used to power the Fear Engine. Jordan uses his energies as a living construct to destroy the Warworld.

The Green Lantern and Sinestro Corps now under Soranik Natu form an alliance against the encroaching Dark Multiverse. Sinestro initially plans to cooperate but is met at the Source Wall by Lex Luthor, who invites Sinestro to Earth to join his Legion of Doom. Attracted by the promise of the "Invisible Emotional Spectrum", a source of power Sinestro became aware of in his youth before joining the Green Lanterns, Sinestro abandons the Corps and travels to Earth. Reverting to his original Silver Age costume, and wielding the power of the Ultraviolet Corps rather than his Qwardian power ring, he successfully brainwashes half the planet and begins to bring the black sun Umbrax, source of the Invisible Spectrum, into the universe. After the plan is foiled, he remains an ally of Luthor.

== Powers and abilities ==
Sinestro wields a yellow power ring that is functionally similar to those of the Green Lanterns, granting him flight, the ability to survive in any environment and the ability to create constructs of any shape and size. The ring must be regularly recharged with the aid of a power battery shaped like a lantern. Unlike Hal Jordan and most Green Lanterns, Sinestro wears his ring on his left hand.

As a host who has mastered fear, Sinestro acts as a host and a containment vessel for the emotional entity of his Corps; Parallax gives him both physical and metaphysical powers. Like previous hosts, Sinestro possesses reality-altering abilities, and a greatly amplified ring. He is at par with some of DC's strongest characters, such as Superman, or most notably Black Adam, shown when both he and Adam moved Earth's moon out of the path of its sun together, or when he was under assault by powerful assailants such as Superwoman, Deathstorm, and Alexander Luthor who had stolen multiple powers.

Sinestro is also highly proficient in hand-to-hand combat and battle strategies, owing to his training as a former Green Lantern. He proves to be a physical match for Hal Jordan owing to these skills.

== Other versions ==
Many alternate universe versions of Sinestro have appeared throughout the character's publication history.

- In Countdown to Final Crisis, Sinestro retained his Green Lantern ring after becoming a villain.
- In Flashpoint, Sinestro was expelled from the Green Lantern Corps by his mentor, Abin Sur, after attempting to use the Flash's power to reset the universe.
- In Absolute Green Lantern, Sinestro, renamed Sin Est Tro, is the leader of the Blackstars and wields the Gold Flame of Enlightenment.

== In other media ==
=== Television ===
- Sinestro appears in Challenge of the Superfriends, voiced by Vic Perrin. This version is a member of the Legion of Doom who can freely travel to and from the antimatter universe.
- Sinestro appears in the Super Friends episode "The Revenge of Doom", voiced by Jeff Winkless. This version is a member of the Legion of Doom.
- Sinestro appears in Legends of the Superheroes, portrayed by Charlie Callas. This version is a member of the Legion of Doom.
- Sinestro appears in series set in the DC Animated Universe (DCAU), voiced by Ted Levine.
  - First appearing in the Superman: The Animated Series episode "In Brightest Day...", this version personally killed Abin Sur.
  - As of the Justice League episode "Secret Society", Sinestro has joined Gorilla Grodd's Secret Society.
  - Sinestro appears in the Static Shock episode "Fallen Hero".
  - Sinestro appears in Justice League Unlimited as a member of an expanded Secret Society.
- Sinestro appears in the Duck Dodgers episode "The Green Loontern", voiced by John de Lancie.
- Sinestro appears in The Batman episode "Ring Toss", voiced by Miguel Ferrer. This version sports a bulbous head and horseshoe moustache.
- Sinestro as a Green Lantern appears in the Batman: The Brave and the Bold episode "The Eyes of Despero!", voiced by Xander Berkeley. This version was previously imprisoned on Oa for his ruthless and violent tendencies. Not knowing this, Batman frees Sinestro to help him fight Despero before learning of his past and imprisoning him in Guy Gardner's ring. Additionally, a heroic, alternate universe version of Sinestro as a Yellow Lantern appears in the episode "Deep Cover For Batman!".
- Sinestro as a Green Lantern appears in the Green Lantern: The Animated Series episode "Prisoner of Sinestro", voiced by Ron Perlman. This version secretly violates the Green Lantern Corps' rules whenever possible and is initially revered by Hal Jordan as a legendary Green Lantern. In an interview with producer Giancarlo Volpe, he revealed Sinestro would have appeared in a second season episode wherein he framed Jordan for his crimes before the series was cancelled.
- Sinestro appears in the Mad segment "Does Someone Have to GOa?", voiced by Jim Meskimen.
- Sinestro appears in the Robot Chicken DC Comics Special and Robot Chicken DC Comics Special 2: Villains in Paradise, voiced by Zeb Wells. This version is a member of the Legion of Doom.
- Sinestro makes non speaking-cameo appearances in Teen Titans Go!.
- Sinestro appears in the Justice League Action episode "The Ringer", voiced by Darin De Paul. This version's power ring is guarded by Despotellis, who provides him with a power boost.
- Sinestro appears in the DC Super Hero Girls (2019) episode "#ItsComplicated", voiced by Keith Ferguson. This version was previously Hal Jordan's friend until he suddenly ghosted him, leading him to seek revenge. Sinestro disguises himself as high school student Thaal Sinclair and pretends to date Carol Ferris to make Jordan jealous before Sinestro apologizes to him.
- Sinestro makes non-speaking cameo appearances in Harley Quinn as a member of the Legion of Doom.
  - Sinestro appears in Kite Man: Hell Yeah!, voiced by Andy Daly. After obtaining the Anti-Life Equation, Lex Luthor kills Sinestro to protect its location.
- Sinestro appears in Lanterns, portrayed by Ulrich Thomsen. This version was imprisoned on Oa after leading a failed coup against the Guardians, during which one of them was killed. He was imprisoned sometime before 2016 and escaped in 2026 with the help of Noah Macon, for whom he crafted a lantern powered by both will and fear. John Stewart finds Sinestro stranded on a desolate world and takes the lantern for his own use while leaving Sinestro trapped despite his pleas for help.

=== Film ===
- Sinestro appears in Green Lantern: First Flight, voiced by Victor Garber. This version is a respected member of the Green Lantern Corps who believes they and the Guardians of the Universe are not proactive enough in maintaining order in the universe. Seeking to overthrow Oa and instill his brand of order through fear, he collaborates with Corps member Boodikka and Kanjar Ro to search for the yellow element and make the Weaponers of Qward fashion it into a weapon capable of destroying the Corps. Sinestro later kills Ro and frames Hal Jordan for it before seeking the weapon, a yellow power ring and battery. He successfully defeats the Guardians and Corps, but Jordan absorbs the Guardians' green element and destroys Sinestro's battery, weakening him before Kilowog crushes Sinestro's ring.
- Sinestro as a Green Lantern appears in Green Lantern: Emerald Knights, voiced by Jason Isaacs. This version previously worked with his friend, Abin Sur, though Atrocitus foresaw his eventual betrayal and formation of the Sinestro Corps.
- Sinestro appears in Green Lantern, portrayed by Mark Strong. This version is a dedicated and respected member of the Green Lantern Corps. He attempts to convince the Guardians of the Universe to defeat Parallax by creating a yellow power ring from the entity's fear energy, but new recruit Hal Jordan convinces the Guardians otherwise. Following Parallax's defeat, Sinestro steals the yellow ring and replaces his green ring with it.
- Sinestro appears in Lego DC Comics Super Heroes: Justice League – Attack of the Legion of Doom, voiced by Mark Hamill.
- Sinestro appears in DC Super Hero Girls: Intergalactic Games, voiced by Tom Kenny.
- Sinestro makes a non-speaking cameo appearance in Teen Titans Go! To the Movies.
- Sinestro appears in Green Lantern: Beware My Power, voiced by Rick D. Wasserman. This version orchestrated the Rann–Thanagar War and Hal Jordan's transformation into Parallax.

=== Video games ===
- Sinestro makes a cameo appearance in Hal Jordan's ending in Mortal Kombat vs. DC Universe.
- Sinestro as a Yellow Lantern appears in Batman: The Brave and the Bold – The Videogame, voiced again by Xander Berkeley.
- Sinestro appears in DC Universe Online, voiced by Robert Kraft. This version is a rival of John Stewart.
- Sinestro appears as a playable co-op character in the PlayStation 3 and Xbox 360 versions of Green Lantern: Rise of the Manhunters, voiced by Marton Csokas.
- Sinestro appears as a playable character in Injustice: Gods Among Us, voiced again by Troy Baker. An alternate universe version of Sinestro appears as a high-ranking member of High Councilor Superman's Regime who converted Hal Jordan into a Yellow Lantern.
- Sinestro appears as a boss and character summon in Scribblenauts Unmasked: A DC Comics Adventure.
- Sinestro appears as a playable character in Infinite Crisis, voiced again by Marc Worden.
- Sinestro appears as a playable character in DC Unchained.

==== Lego ====
- Sinestro appears as a boss and unlockable character in Lego Batman 2: DC Super Heroes, voiced by Troy Baker.
- Sinestro appears as a playable character in Lego Batman 3: Beyond Gotham, voiced by Marc Worden.
- Sinestro appears in Lego DC Super-Villains, voiced again by Marc Worden. This version is a member of the Legion of Doom.

=== Miscellaneous ===
- A hologram of Sinestro appears in Legion of Super Heroes in the 31st Century #6.
- Sinestro appears in Justice League Unlimited #46.
- Sinestro appears in Batman: The Brave and the Bold #19.
- The Injustice incarnation of Sinestro appears in the Injustice: Gods Among Us prequel comic. This version was a dictator who drove his wife Arin Sur to suicide and became estranged from his daughter Soranik. Subsequently, he was depowered and expelled by Hal Jordan and the Green Lantern Corps, which he saw as a betrayal. In the present, Sinestro leads the Sinestro Corps in intercepting and killing Kyle Rayner before he can reach the Justice League's Watchtower. While Superman nearly beats Sinestro to death, the latter reveals he came to join the former, recognizing Superman's personality shift. Sinestro is temporarily imprisoned in the Hall of Justice until he explains his history to Superman, who comes to view him as a kindred spirit and frees him. While being forced to work together to find a device capable of destroying planets, Sinestro and Jordan work out their tense relationship. To further Superman's growing Regime, Sinestro stages an attack on Earth by Despero before killing him and staging it as him acting in self-defense, kills John Stewart, and manipulates Jordan into believing Guy Gardner did so. After Jordan inadvertently kills Gardner, he is expelled from the Green Lantern Corps, after which Sinestro convinces him to become a Yellow Lantern.
- Sinestro appears in the DC Super Hero Girls (2015) four-part episode "Ring Me Maybe", voiced by Tom Kenny.
- The Injustice incarnation of Sinestro appears in the Injustice 2 prequel comic. Following the fall of Superman's Regime, Sinestro and Hal Jordan stand trial on Oa for their role in aiding and abetting Superman, during which they are sentenced to imprisonment on the planet Harring. After Jordan beats Sinestro for manipulating him, the latter is placed in solitary confinement and later visited by Soranik, who questions him over her mother Arin's demise. He attempts to steal Soranik's power ring, but the Red Lantern Corps arrive to take Sinestro. He tries to take one of their power rings, but Jordan puts it on. The arriving Green Lantern Corps retreat, taking Sinestro back to Oa to question him about Atrocitus' identity. Amidst Starro and the Red Lantern Corps' attack on Oa, Jordan convinces the Guardians of the Universe to give Sinestro a power ring so he can help repel the attack and save Soranik. Refusing to harm her despite her being possessed by a Starro spore, Sinestro is impaled by her, but he successfully removes her spore and apologizes to her before he dies. Afterward, Soranik succeeds him as a Green Lantern.
- Sinestro appears in DC X Sonic the Hedgehog.
- Sinestro appears as a minifigure in Lego's minifigure theme, appearing as part of the DC Super Heroes series.
