= Green Lantern: Beware My Power =

2022 animated film by DC Comics

- DVD cover
- Directed by: Jeff Wamester
- Written by: John Semper; Ernie Altbacker
- Based on: Emerald Twilight by Ron Marz Zero Hour: Crisis in Time! by Dan Jurgens; Jerry Ordway Rann–Thanagar War by Dave Gibbons
- Produced by: Sam Register; Jim Krieg
- Starring: Aldis Hodge; Jimmi Simpson
- Edited by: Bruce A. King
- Music by: Kevin Riepl
- Production companies: Warner Bros. Animation; DC Entertainment
- Distributed by: Warner Bros. Home Entertainment
- Release dates: July 22, 2022 (SDCC); July 26, 2022
- Running time: 84 minutes
- Country: United States
- Language: English

Green Lantern: Beware My Power is a 2022 American superhero animated film based on DC Comics featuring the John Stewart incarnation of Green Lantern, produced by Warner Bros. Animation and distributed by Warner Bros. Home Entertainment. It is the overall 49th installment in the DC Universe Animated Original Movies, and the fifth film set in the DC Animated Movie Universe's second phase, which began with Superman: Man of Tomorrow. The film is directed by Jeff Wamester, from a script by John Semper and Ernie Altbacker, and stars Aldis Hodge and Jimmi Simpson. In the film, Marine veteran John Stewart is chosen to become a member of the Green Lantern Corps following the apparent death of Hal Jordan, leading Stewart to be caught in the middle of a Rannian-Thanagarian war, and aided by Justice League member Green Arrow, Rannian hero Adam Strange, and Thanagarian warrior Shayera Hol.

The film contains elements (such as Parallax taking over Hal Jordan) from several DC Comics storylines including the 1994 storyline "Emerald Twilight" written by Ron Marz, the 1995 storyline "Zero Hour: Crisis in Time!" written by Dan Jurgens, and the 2005 storyline "Rann–Thanagar War" written by Dave Gibbons.

== Plot ==
Former Marine and Medal of Honor recipient John Stewart, struggling with civilian life after serving as a sniper in Afghanistan, witnesses Ganthet's spaceship crash nearby. Ganthet dies of his injuries, and the Power Ring he carries — previously owned by Hal Jordan — attaches itself to Stewart's finger. The ring flies Stewart up to the Justice League Watchtower, (Note: The formation of the team was suggested by Barry Allen in Justice Society: World War II but it wasn't until the fight with Amazo and Superman being injured and Green Arrow and Allen bringing him to Batman for medical help sometime later.) where he meets Green Arrow, Martian Manhunter, and Vixen, who were monitoring a disturbance in space. With the Guardians of the Universe unresponsive and Jordan's apparent death, Stewart and Green Arrow use Ganthet's repaired ship to travel to Oa, which they discover in ruins and the Green Lantern Corps slaughtered. They encounter Thanagarian warrior Shayera Hol, who indicates security footage showing a Rannian ship docking at Oa just before the attack.

Shayera explains that the Thanagarian-Rannian war had briefly ended, with Jordan overseeing a joint project using Zeta-Beam technology to benefit both planets. The experiment was a success at first, then went haywire, transporting Thanagar into Rann's atmosphere, upsetting the ecosystem of both planets, restarting the war, and apparently killing Jordan and thousands of Thanagarians and Rannians. Shayera accuses Rann of sabotaging the experiment and attacking Oa, but Stewart and Green Arrow insist they investigate further.

The team travels to a Rannian military outpost that was raided by Thanagarians, where they encounter Rannian hero Adam Strange, presumed deceased but teleported at random by Zeta-Beams' attraction to him. (Note: The disappearance of Adam Strange is explained in DC Showcase: Adam Strange.) Strange denies that Rann attacked Oa and leads them to Rannian High Command, engaged in a battle with Thanagarian forces. Rannian Captain Kantus reveals that Rannian scientist Sardath, Strange's father-in-law, has converted the Zeta-Beam project into a doomsday weapon to destroy Thanagar. Shayera and Strange review footage from past attacks and discover that a third party has been impersonating both Rannian and Thanagarian ships to further the war.

Retracing the trajectories of the imposter ships, the team discovers a base hidden inside an asteroid, where they battle the Yellow Lanterns, along with a group of galactic assassins including Lord Damyn, Kanjar Ro, and Despero, before being captured by their leader Sinestro. Jordan is revealed to be alive, having released his ring and been taken prisoner after Sinestro sabotaged the Zeta-Beam experiment. They escape as Sinestro and his Lanterns attack Rann to find the location of Sardath's doomsday weapon. Using the Zeta-Beams, Sardath teleports them to his secret base, but Sinestro and his Lanterns follow and attack. During the battle, Stewart reluctantly kills Sinestro and Jordan brutally kills two of Sinestro's assassins leaving Green Arrow and John Stewart suspicious of his actions.

After obtaining the Zeta-Beam data, Jordan suddenly kills Sardath; he reveals that, when he was captured, Sinestro had infected him with the Parallax Entity, corrupting him. After Sinestro had destroyed the Green Lanterns, Jordan had claimed all their rings for himself, enhancing his power to a godlike state. With the Zeta-Beam technology, Jordan intends to destroy both Rann and Thanagar in a quest to end conflict across the galaxy and reshape it in his own image.

Stewart and Jordan battle until Green Arrow is forced to shoot and kill Jordan. They are unable to stop the weapon from firing, but Strange flies in the path of the Zeta-Beam, teleporting it and himself to parts unknown. Stewart and Green Arrow return to Earth, and Stewart sends Jordan's rings to their new wearers to rebuild the Green Lantern Corps. Shayera departs from Earth, in Ganthet's spaceship, promising to Green Arrow and Stewart they would meet again soon knowing Rann and Thanagar will need the new Green Lanterns and the Justice League to help rebuild both worlds when a ceasefire is ordered. Stewart proposes dinner and a toast to "absent friends" to Green Arrow, to which he replies "and maybe a few new ones".

== Voice cast ==
- Aldis Hodge as John Stewart / Green Lantern
- Jimmi Simpson as Oliver Queen / Green Arrow
- Ike Amadi as Martian Manhunter
- Brian Bloom as Adam Strange
- Jamie Gray Hyder as Shayera Hol
- Mara Junot as Lyssa Drak, Banth Dar
- Jason J. Lewis as Ganthet, Captain Kantus
- Sunil Malhotra as Power Ring voice, Rannian commander
- Nolan North as Hal Jordan / Green Lantern / Parallax (credited), Pariah (uncredited)
- Keesha Sharp as Vixen
- Simon Templeman as Sardath, console voice
- Rick D. Wasserman as Sinestro

== Production ==
Green Lantern: Beware My Power was announced in October 2021 during the second DC FanDome event. Aldis Hodge, who was cast as Hawkman in the DC Extended Universe (DCEU) film Black Adam, was cast as John Stewart along with the rest of the voice cast. Brian Bloom replaces Charlie Weber as Adam Strange, who voiced the character in DC Showcase: Adam Strange.

== Release ==
Green Lantern: Beware My Power premiered July 22, 2022, at San Diego Comic-Con and was released on July 26 on DVD, Blu-ray, and 4K.

== Reception ==
On the review aggregator website Rotten Tomatoes, 56% of 9 critics' reviews are positive, with an average rating of 5.9/10.

Samantha Nixon of IGN gave the film a 4 out of 10, criticizing the large number of characters introduced, not giving John Stewart a satisfying backstory, and not fulfilling the potential of its comic book inspiration. They praised the animation of facial expressions and fights. Sam Stone of Comic Book Resources praised the pacing, action set pieces, and cast, particularly Aldis Hodge as John Stewart.

Green Lantern: Beware My Power has earned $740,607 from domestic home video sales.
