= Rann–Thanagar War =

2005 DC Comics limited series

Rann-Thanagar War
- Cover to Rann-Thanagar War #1, art by Ivan Reis and Marc Campos.

Publication information
- Publisher: DC Comics
- Schedule: Monthly
- Format: Limited series
- Genre: , science fiction, superhero
- Publication date: (Limited series) July 2005 - December 2005 (Infinite Crisis Special #1) April 2006
- No. of issues: 6, with 1 Infinite Crisis Special
- Main character(s): Hawkman, Hawkwoman, Hawkgirl, Adam Strange, Blackfire, Green Lantern Corps, Captain Comet, Starman

Creative team
- Written by: Dave Gibbons
- Penciller: Ivan Reis
- Inker: Marc Campos
- Colorist: John Kalisz

Collected editions
- Rann-Thanagar War: ISBN 1-4012-0839-8

Rann–Thanagar War is a six-issue comic book limited series published by DC Comics in 2005. Written by Dave Gibbons, and illustrated by Ivan Reis, Marc Campos, and John Kalisz, the series concerns a war between the planets Rann and Thanagar, and features Adam Strange, the Green Lantern Corps, Hawkman, Hawkgirl, L.E.G.I.O.N. and Captain Comet, along with other DC space adventurers. The series was followed in early 2006 with the one-shot book Rann-Thanager War: Infinite Crisis Special #1.

== Overview ==
Rann-Thanagar War, along with Villains United, The OMAC Project, and Day of Vengeance, is one of four miniseries which lead up to DC Comics' Infinite Crisis event. Unlike most of the other tie-ins, it is also a continuation of storylines from two other series: Adam Strange: Planet Heist and Green Lantern: Rebirth.

- Rann-Thanagar War #1-6
- Hawkman #46-49
- Infinite Crisis Special #1
- Rann/Thanagar Holy War #1-4
- Hawkman Special #1
- Adam Strange Special #1
- Rann/Thanagar Holy War #5-8

== Pre-Crisis war ==
In the continuity which existed prior to the Crisis on Infinite Earths limited series, a war erupted between the planets Rann and Thanagar. Rann's adopted hero Adam Strange and Thanagarian law enforcement officers Hawkman (Katar Hol) and Hawkgirl (Shayera Hol) worked desperately to end the conflict. The trio succeeded, eventually revealing that events leading up to the war were manipulated by the intergalactic criminal Kanjar Ro.

== Series plot summary ==
During Planet Heist, Adam Strange fought a rogue group of Thanagarians. During the battle, the leader of the group transported Strange's adopted homeworld of Rann into the Thanagarian system in the hope of creating a dictatorship. However, Rann's new location caused the orbit of Thanagar to become unstable, and the planet crashed into the system's sun. The surviving Thanagarians and Rannians now all live on Rann, and tensions are high between the two groups, as each blames the other for their predicament.

Aware that war could erupt at any time, Strange goes to Earth to recruit the help of Hawkman and Hawkgirl, who are from Thanagar, in preventing a war. Meanwhile, Kyle Rayner and Captain Comet go to Thanagar to investigate, finding Onimar Synn and engaging in a battle, with Synn escaping through a drop ship. They then find hundreds of bodies buried underground, supplying Synn with energy, where Kilowog shows up. Later, Kilowog and Rayner terraform Thanagar back to life and save the underground bodies.

When Strange and the Hawks arrive on Rann, they are shocked to see that the war has already begun. They form a team, including the Thanagarian Hawkwoman and the Tamaranean Blackfire. More and more planets are drawn into the war as Rann and Thanagar each call on their respective allies. Seeing a chance to seize power, Blackfire betrays the group, killing Hawkwoman in the process. It becomes clear that all factions have a common enemy: Synn. With the help of Tigorr of the Omega Men and Captain Comet, Strange's team manages to cut Synn into seven pieces, and each piece is inserted into a separate star to prevent him from reforming.

At the end of the series, the assorted forces of Rann and Thanagar are faced with a fracture in space that resembles those that were seen during the Crisis on Infinite Earths.

== Rann/Thanagar War: Infinite Crisis Special #1 - "Hands of Fate" ==
In Rann/Thanagar War: Infinite Crisis Special #1, the rift begins endangering the lives of those in the star system by sending out destructive energy waves. Donna Troy's assembled heroes are working to keep the peace between the two warring forces, when Adam Strange receives a message from Tigorr of the Omega Men. He leads Strange, along with Hawkman and Hawkgirl, to a stray Thanagarian surveillance satellite, which has documented footage of Superboy-Prime forcing Rann and Thanagar to collide, and thus, go to war.

Though the satellite is soon lost in the chaotic environment, Strange has an idea to gather the heads of each faction so that they might stop fighting amongst themselves and work together against the new cosmic threat. Meanwhile, Green Lantern Kyle Rayner has been working with former lover, Jade, to fight against the enormous hands forcing open a hole in spacetime. Jade is unable to survive the electromagnetic energy surges and dies. In her last moments, she breathes the emerald energy that Kyle once granted her back into him, increasing his powers significantly.

Kyle gives Jade's body to her father, Alan Scott, and he cradles her in his arms, remarking how she seems herself again, until another energy wave destroys her mortal remains. Kyle, once again calling himself Ion, tells Alan that as long as the two of them live on, her unique spirit and energy will continue.

Upon Kyle's ascension, the Guardians note that he is the first of a "new breed, the next step in the evolution of our cause". There is debate of whether so much power can be wielded by any Lantern, but Kyle's previous experience is considered, and the Guardians agree that being able to monitor him this time is an important difference.

On the barren surface of Thanagar, Adam Strange finds evidence to present to all of the warring groups: handprints deep within an enormous crater, created by Superboy Prime's interference. L.E.G.I.O.N., Thanagar, Rann and New Cronus combine their forces to make a full assault on the force behind the rift, with Ion in the lead.

== Rann/Thanagar: Holy War ==
A new eight-issue limited series entitled Rann-Thanagar Holy War began publication in May 2008. The new series was written by Jim Starlin with art by Ron Lim.

== Collected editions ==
In January 2006, this series was collected in a 160-page trade paperback (ISBN 1-4012-0839-8). The one-shot special was collected in Infinite Crisis Companion (ISBN 1-4012-0922-X). The Rann-Thanagar: Holy War limited series was collected in two volumes.

== In other media ==
Elements of Rann–Thanagar War are adapted in the Tomorrowverse films DC Showcase: Adam Strange and Green Lantern: Beware My Power.
