= Adam Strange =

DC Comics fictional character

- Adam Strange as depicted in DC Archive Editions: Adam Strange, vol. 3 (April 2008). Art by Carmine Infantino (penciller) and Murphy Anderson (inker).

Publication information
- Publisher: DC Comics
- First appearance: Showcase #17 (November 1958)
- Created by: Murphy Anderson; Gardner Fox; Julius Schwartz; Mike Sekowsky

In-story information
- Species: Human
- Place of origin: Rann formerly Earth
- Team affiliations: Justice League; Justice League United; Seven Soldiers of Victory; R.E.B.E.L.S.
- Partnerships: Sardath; Hawkman
- Abilities: Wears a jet propulsion spacesuit that allows for sustained flight, interstellar travel and outer atmospheric survival; Carries solid-light energy generated equipment; manifests energy guns via spacesuit; Possesses an onboard zeta-beamer module for instantaneous intergalactic travel, a floating A.I. device recently integrated into his flight uniform.; Advanced marksmanship; Peak of human physical conditioning; Cloned eyes can see into the whole electromagnetic spectrum; Advanced hand-to-hand combatant and martial artist; Genius-level intelligence; Eidetic memory

Adam Strange is a superhero appearing in American comic books published by DC Comics. The character was created by editor Julius Schwartz, designed by Murphy Anderson, Gardner Fox and Mike Sekowsky. He first appeared in Showcase #17 (November 1958).

Adam Strange made his live-action debut in the television series Krypton, portrayed by Shaun Sipos. Additionally, Michael T. Weiss, Michael Trucco, and Brian Bloom have voiced the character in animation.

== Creation ==
In 1957, DC Comics editorial director Irwin Donenfeld held a meeting with editors Jack Schiff and Julius Schwartz in his office, asking them each to create a new science fiction hero, one from the present and one from the future. Given first pick Schiff chose to create one from the future, Space Ranger. Schwartz was happy with the pick feeling that readers would more readily identify with a hero from the present. He conceived the idea of an Earth man repeatedly traveling to a planet in the Alpha Centauri star system by using a "Zeta-beam" altered by space radiation. Since Adam Strange was the first human on another planet, he named his character Adam after the Biblical first man. When asked about the inspiration behind the character, Gardner Fox stated "I suppose you could say that John Carter was in my subconscious. You had to think of some interesting way to transfer him from earth up to the planet Rann before you even got started in on a plot, but it was fun to do."

== Publication history ==
Adam Strange debuted in issues #17–19 of the tryout series Showcase, published November 1958-March 1959. The first artwork of the character was a cover for Showcase #17 by Murphy Anderson. Schwartz rejected the drawing and commissioned a new one by Gil Kane, though Anderson's costume design was retained. Schwartz then assigned the scribing of the stories to Gardner Fox and the penciling to Mike Sekowsky. Schwartz and Fox devised the plots for the stories in Schwartz's office and Fox would write the scripts at home. A science major, Schwartz specialized in giving Fox scientific pointers that gave the Adam Strange tales a plausibility that made them stand out from most science fiction comic books of the time.

Sales on the three-issue Showcase tryout were enough to justify giving Adam Strange a slot in Mystery in Space, which ran in issues #53–100 and 102. Though Schwartz and Fox continued their work on the character, Schwartz gave the penciler assignment to Carmine Infantino instead of Sekowsky. Most issues were inked by Murphy Anderson (although Bernard Sachs, Joe Giella and Sid Greene did a few issues each). After his adventures in Mystery in Space were cancelled, Adam Strange continued to have guest appearances in several DC Comics titles. Perhaps the most notable is an adventure written by Gardner Fox and illustrated by Murphy Anderson for Hawkman #18 (1967). In it, Hawkman fails to find his planet, Thanagar, and his search leads him to Rann, where he shares an adventure with Adam Strange. In Justice League of America, the Flash mentioned Adam Strange as a possible new member for the Justice League. When a letter to the editor pointed out the group had not met Adam Strange and could not have heard of him, as all his heroics took place on Rann, Schwartz and Fox wrote a story showing how the Justice League came to Rann and how Adam Strange saved them from Kanjar Ro. The story was published in Mystery in Space #75 and won the Alley Award for the "Best Book-Length Story" of 1962.

As of #92, Jack Schiff replaced Schwartz as editor of Mystery in Space and Lee Elias became the artist for Adam Strange. Following the discontinuation of the Adam Strange stories reprints were presented in Strange Adventures #217 through 244 (except for #222, which instead has a new story with Strange, written by Denny O'Neil, while #226 has a new Strange text story by Fox, with illustrations by Anderson).

Adam Strange had stories written by Dave Wood, Jerry Siegel, and Dennis O'Neil, art by Lee Elias and inks by John Giunta.

Through the 1970s the character was a regular presence in the DC Universe despite having no series of his own. In September 1980 Adam Strange began as a back-up feature in Green Lantern (this lasted from #132 to #147). Later in the 1980s Alan Moore wrote a retcon of Adam Strange's reason for his visits to Rann. In this retcon the population of the planet, the majority of whom view the Terran with contempt, is sterile, and Adam Strange is there to be a breeding stud. In a 1990 limited series, The Man of Two Worlds, Adam learns of the population's opinion of him and Alanna dies giving birth to their daughter Aleea. In 1997, Grant Morrison revived the Justice League of America in the JLA series. During this period, Mark Waid featured Adam Strange when he filled in for Morrison. In JLA #20 (July 1998), Alanna is revealed to be alive and is briefly reunited with her husband and daughter before Adam returns to Earth.

Adam appeared in stories set in the Silver Age: Legends of the DC Universe 80-Page Giant #1 (1998); Silver Age: Showcase #1 (2000); DC Universe: Legacies #5 (2010); and DC Retroactive: Justice League - The '70s (2011).

In 2013, Jeff Lemire said he intended to introduce a New 52 incarnation of Adam Strange at some point in Justice League Canada, a series scheduled to launch in Spring 2014. Lemire's series was instead titled Justice League United, featuring Adam and Alanna.

The series Strange Adventures vol. 5, written by Tom King and illustrated by Mitch Gerads and Evan Shaner was launched in 2020, focusing on the character of Adam Strange.

== Fictional character biography ==
Strange is an archeologist suddenly teleported from Peru, Earth, to the planet Rann through a "Zeta-Beam". Upon his arrival, he is attacked by one of the planet's predators and rescued by a dark-haired woman named Alanna. She takes him to her father Sardath, who explains that the Zeta-Beam was transmitted to Earth in the hopes that whatever form of intelligent life lived there would trace it back to Rann, and he also theorizes that in the four years it took the Zeta-Beam to reach Earth, it was exposed to radiation and transformed into a transportation beam. Called on to protect the planet from extraterrestrial threats using Rann's technology, Strange grows to care for the planet and its inhabitants, especially Alanna. Eventually, the effects of the beam's transportation wear off, returning Strange to Earth at the exact point of departure. However, Sardath gives him a schedule of beam firings, allowing him to periodically return to the planet.

Years later, during an exile in space, Swamp Thing arrives on Rann, where he meets Adam Strange. In this story it is revealed that centuries ago the planet's population suffered nuclear wars and left them not only with the loss of a large part of their ecosystem, but also with a genetic problem that made the majority of the population sterile. Alanna is among the last Rannians born before the event and maintains fertility.

Over time, Sardath perfects a beam he would call the "Mega Zeta-Beam" which would allow Adam to permanently transport himself to Rann. Adam learns that he was transported to Rann on purpose to serve as Alanna's husband and repopulate the planet. Alanna gives birth to a girl named Aleea, but apparently dies in the process.

Years later, Adam is on Rann raising Aleea and helping to restore the planet, when he learns that Alanna was placed in suspended animation and captured by the En'Taran Slavemasters. Adam convinces the conquerors that he must kidnap the Justice League to rebuild the planet more quickly, and thus, together with the group, he not only rebuilds Rann but defeats the En'tarang and frees Alanna. In the process, Adam loses all traces of the Mega Zeta Ray in his body and returns to Earth. Adam returns to Rann and reunited with his family shortly after.

=== Planet Heist ===
Planet Heist, a 2004 eight-issue limited series, written by Andy Diggle, penciled by Pasqual Ferry and colored by Dave McCaig, replaced Adam Strange's costume with a spacesuit that allows for interstellar travel. Adam is preparing to relocate to Rann permanently when he learns that Sardath transported the planet to another dimension to protect it from Starbreaker. Adam, with the help of the Omega Men and the Darkstars, among others, saves Rann and defeats Starbreaker.

=== Rann-Thanagar War ===
When Rann is moved from Alpha Centauri to Polaris, its orbit is believed to have pushed the planet Thanagar closer to its sun, destroying much of the surface. Many Thanagarians relocate to Rann, but enmity between the two races results in a war. Strange, working with Hawkman, Hawkwoman, Kyle Rayner and Kilowog, ends the war after discovering Superboy-Prime's role in Thanagar's relocation.

=== 52 ===
In 52, Adam is stranded on another planet with Animal Man and Starfire and is blinded in a Zeta-Beam accident. After being attacked by Devilance, the three escape and battle Lady Styx, who is ravaging planets across the galaxy. With Styx presumably defeated and Animal Man seemingly killed, Strange and Starfire continue their journey back to Earth and Rann while Styx's followers pursue them. With Starfire wounded in one such battle, and their ship breaking apart and malfunctioning, Adam is rescued by Mogo and a rookie Green Lantern. He is then brought to Rann, where his vision is restored.

=== Countdown to Adventure ===
Adam Strange joined Animal Man and Starfire in the series Countdown to Adventure written by Adam Beechen in August 2007.

In issue #1, Adam is replaced as Rann's protector by former actor Champ Hazard. However, Hazard has no regard for any life and is responsible for ending his battles in a horrifically bloody way. It appears Champ was infected by a madness plague created by Lady Styx before leaving Earth, and has infected one-third of the people on Rann, causing them to riot and say "Believe in Her". Adam and his family escape to Earth, where he enlists the aid of Animal Man and Starfire, eventually discovering a way to cure the plague and restore the infectees to normal.

=== Rann-Thanagar Holy War ===
Adam Strange, along with many of the DC space heroes including Hawkman, Starfire, Weird, and Starman (Prince Gavyn), battles Synnar the Demiurge. Adam Strange's actions in this story result in the depopulation of Gavyn's Throneworld at the hands of Lady Styx. Later, to defeat Synnar and Styx, Rann's atmosphere was explosively discharged into outer space with Rann's entire population Zeta-beamed to Throneworld. Strange also discovers in this story that he is a member of the so-called Aberrant Six.

=== Strange Adventures ===
With Throneworld renamed New Rann, Adam Strange once more teams up with the DC space heroes to investigate why some of the galaxy's stars are disappearing. It is discovered from the future spirit of Synnar that he is destined to be one of 'The Aberrant Six', a group critical to preventing the Synnar of today (trapped in Weird's body) from destroying the universe. Ultimately the Aberrant Six did not form and the future Synnar was forced to leave, but not before Captain Comet's mercenary friend Eye was killed by Synnar's supreme god-enemy to prevent the forming of the Six. Comet was entrusted with Eye's robot companion Orb until she returns, told by Synnar that when that happens he will "continue his negotiations – all has changed, but remains as it was". Adam Strange realizes that one day Synnar will return and force him to join his Aberrant Six.

=== R.E.B.E.L.S. ===
Adam Strange works with Vril Dox and the R.E.B.E.L.S. to battle Starro. It was also around this time that Adam Strange visited New Krypton to protest the accord that their Council reached with the Thanagarians. Explaining that the Rannians have recently been on the losing end in a war with the Thanagarians, Adam questions the judgment of the Council in reaching this accord. Whilst there he aided Superman who was investigating a murder.

The plight of Rann's people was soon resolved by Dox, seeking to restore his reputation after Starro stole L.E.G.I.O.N. from him and used it to enslave its client worlds. Dox Zeta-beamed Rann into the Vega system, in the orbit previously held by the now-destroyed planet Tamaran, and proceeded to terraform Rann and make it suitable to sustain life again.

The restoration of Rann was not Dox's only reason for relocating it into the Vega system. First, by putting Rann into Tamaran's orbit, it restored the gravitational balance to the Vega system, which had been thrown off by Tamaran's destruction. Secondly, in exchange for restoring their planet, the people of Rann agreed to let Dox rebuild L.E.G.I.O.N. headquarters on Rann.

Tamaranean refugees led by Blackfire attack Rann, believing that since the planet was in Tamaran's orbit, they had claim to it. The violence is ended when Dox, who was off-world at the start of the conflict, arrives and stops the conflict. Dox had been off-world negotiating an end to the Rann-Thanagar War, using Rann's newfound distance from Thanagar and change in leadership on both sides as leverage. Dox proposes that the Tamaraneans live on Rann's uninhabited southern continent.

=== The New 52 ===
In The New 52, a 2011 reboot of the DC Comics universe, Adam Strange was reintroduced to mainstream continuity as a Canadian archaeologist who has a relationship with Alanna (now Alanna Lewis, a former student of his). He and other heroes are teleported to his home planet Rann to stop Byth Rok. He and Alanna then became founding members of the Justice League United. An accident with the Zeta Beam allowed Adam to merge with its time-space energy signature, allowing him to project his consciousness throughout all known reality. By the end of the series, Adam would lose his newfound abilities and return to normal.

During Vandal Savage's scheme to gain more power from the comet that made him immortal, the JLU assisted a weaker Superman's efforts to thwart his plans. However, the heroes were captured and their powers used as fuel to bring the comet closer to Earth to give Savage's descendants their own abilities. They were saved by Superman, who was now empowered by Kryptonite, and the heroes held back Savage's forces long enough for Superman to finally defeat the immortal, after which the hero dies.

=== DC Rebirth ===
Strange was next featured in The Death of Hawkman series, once again caught in the middle of the Rann/Thanagar conflict. Suspicious that Thanagar initiated the first attack, Adam began an investigation into the events with the aid of his friend Hawkman. The two soon discover that Despero was behind the conflict, aiming to collect the planets Nth Metal supply. They fought Despero, but the villain proved to be too strong to handle. In an act of desperation, Hawkman ordered Adam to active a machine that will magnetize all of the planets Nth Metal, killing Hawkman and Despero. A reluctant Adam agreed, but the machine unexpectedly sent him hurtling into another dimension.

He soon found his way back to the DC Universe, where he divides his attention between his home world and his adopted world. He also became a reserve member of the Justice League.

== Skills and equipment ==
Adam Strange does not have superhuman abilities, choosing to rely more on quick thinking and ingenuity. Before coming to Rann, Strange was an accomplished explorer and archaeologist who specialized in gathering and studying lost artifacts from the remains of ancient civilizations. Applying these qualities to his new life on Rann, he would venture out with his new family into the wilds of their homeworld to study and rediscover its ancient history. Eventually his experiences accumulated on his adventures through the study and understanding of both Rannian culture and its vast technologies as well as its vested history, enabled Adam to pick up a host of vaunted combat techniques and scientific knowledge, giving him the edge needed to physically match and defeat immeasurably more imposing opponents. This along with his many decades of thriving in the harsh environments of Rann, Earth and other galactic territories has made Adam an accomplished survivalist, having spent just as long traversing the rural areas as treacherous as the Amazon rainforest back on Earth.

Strange has a tactical intellect on par with - or exceeding - the likes of Bruce Wayne and Lex Luthor, and complements this with the learning that he has gained in his many years of study on Rann. He is able to reverse engineer functional technological wonders even from the damaged remains of an alien ship with ease. He is also an accomplished mathematician, who can expertly deduce the exact time and place when and where Sardath's Zeta Beam will hit on his home planet of Earth. Mark Waid showcases his intellect in his run on JLA. After Rann is conquered by a telepathic race called En'Tarans, Strange defeats them by secretly converting the planet into a giant Zeta Beam gun, powered by the latent Mega Zeta Radiation in his body. With the aid of the JLA, Strange successfully transports the En'Taran fleet to another part of the galaxy. In the aftermath of the Infinite Crisis event, Adam Strange loses his eyes in a freak Zeta Beam accident. Sardath is able to clone a new set of eyes from his granddaughter, Aleea Strange, and transplant them into Adam. These new eyes enable Adam to see the entire electromagnetic spectrum.

=== Technology ===
As the protector of Rann, Adam is connected with Sardath and his science council. Adam uses a variety of technologies both as a hero and spacefarer. The resources of Rann's science available to him are numerous. He has studied, disassembled and rebuilt much of his own equipment, consisting of high-tech munitions, armor, gadgets, utensils, or genetics engineering. Adam is versed in their mechanical function and practical use.

==== Space suit ====
Adam Strange is an adept aerial combatant, often making use of a fireproof, thermal insulated and environmentally adapted suit with which to traverse the terrains of foreign worlds or in the cold depths of space. With further upgrades, Adam's costume boasts a built-in Zeta Beamer with which to warp lightyears across the universe in an instant.

The helmet is equipped with a life support system that protects Adam from harmful atmospheric conditions, while the suit itself pulls up a head-up display system with which to control his equipment via thought and voice command. Technology of which is slaved to his handheld blaster, sporting real-time threat assessment and targeting priority reticules to better combat adversaries.

The jetpack is a twin-engine propulsion system attached to a harness adorning his back capable of aerial aviation for an undisclosed amount of time. Adam is also versed in other kinds of rocket propulsion equipment like a booster system with hidden back up blasters, capable of escaping orbit.

==== Alien arsenal ====
Adam Strange's primary weapon of choice is a Rannian laser pistol among other assorted weapons and munitions picked up from across the galaxy. He is a crack marksman with just about any ranged weapon on hand at the time, the gun comes with a targeting system conductor when worked in tandem with his costume and has a stun setting for non-lethal application.

Other munitions in his arsenal include Holo-Blasters, which are Hard-Light Energy arms that Adam can use to conjure any number of ordinance or enhanced protective shielding with while in a firefight. The effectiveness of these armaments makes them potent enough in dispatching Smite, one of Starro's lieutenants boasting physical capabilities rivaling Superman or Lobo. When properly calibrated by outside forces, these energy weapons can also channel the light of a Power Ring or a facsimile of its corresponding emotion that can take down Black Lanterns.

==== Zeta Beamer apparatus ====
Initially designed as a means of communications with intelligent life from across the universe, the Zeta Beam was accidentally discovered to be an instantaneous means of intergalactic transport that utilizes a cosmic radiation called Zeta Rays. The effects of the ray are initially short-lived and return the user to the point of activation. This would be a running staple for years until later Zeta designs made its effects permanent, albeit at the cost debilitating mental sickness. Eventual innovations in Rannian transport technology produced a more streamlined device called the Zeta Beamer module, an A.I. commanded mobile drone in the form of a floating sphere that can track Zeta Rays across galaxies and even alternate universes.

== Other versions ==
=== Just Imagine... ===
An alternate universe version of Adam Strange appears in Just Imagine.... This version is the superpowered teenage son of the villainous Reverend Dominic Darrk and Morgan le Fey.

=== Space Ranger ===
Adam Strange's identically named descendant appears in Mystery in Space #94 (September 1964).

=== Elseworlds ===
- Adam Strange makes a cameo appearance in The Kingdom: Planet Krypton #1.
- Adam Strange makes cameo appearances in JLA: The Nail.
- Adam Strange appears in DC: The New Frontier. He is confined in Arkham Asylum because of his belief he has traveled to another world. When the Centre attacks Earth, Strange escapes Arkham and helps the heroes defeat it.
- Paul Pope's Wednesday Comics featured an interpretation of Adam Strange inspired by John Carter, depicting Rann as a fantasy world and Alanna as a warrior princess.

=== Future Quest ===
Adam Strange had a crossover with Jonny Quest in Adam Strange / Future Quest Annual #1 in March 2017.

== In other media ==
=== Television ===
- Adam Strange appears in Batman: The Brave and the Bold, voiced by Michael T. Weiss.
- Adam Strange appears in Young Justice, voiced by Michael Trucco. This version is a scientist at S.T.A.R. Labs and a member of the Erdel Initiative who maintains the Justice League's Zeta-Beam technology.
- Adam Strange appears in Krypton, portrayed by Shaun Sipos. This version is a college dropout and failed archeologist from Detroit who stole a piece of Rannian teleportation technology he calls a "Zeta-Beam" to become a superhero. Following a time disruption that kills Superman, Strange uses the device to travel to Krypton 200 years in the past and warn Superman's grandfather Seg-El. Both fans and critics have noted similarities between the series' version of Strange and Booster Gold, with many outlets considering the former an amalgamation of the two. Additionally, after the episode "House of Zod" aired, which features a scene where Strange flirts with a male soldier, Sipos went on to explain on his Twitter account, "Krypton defies gender, race and sexual orientation". In an interview during San Diego Comic-Con 2018, he talked further about the decision to make Strange bisexual or sexually fluid, stating that he is "moving between any and all [sexual labels]. There don't need to be lines here".
- A new series titled Strange Adventures was in development at HBO Max. It was said to be "a one-hour drama and superhero anthology series that will feature characters from across the DC canon", but not confirmed to feature Adam Strange himself. In August 2022, the series was scrapped.

=== Film ===
- Adam Strange makes a non-speaking cameo appearance in Justice League: The New Frontier.
- Adam Strange appears in films set in the Tomorrowverse.
- In DC Showcase: Adam Strange, Adam Strange, voiced by Charlie Weber, was teleported to the Eden mining colony during a Thanagarian attack, during which Alanna was killed. He attempts to return using a Zeta beam to search for his daughter Aleea, who may have survived, but years pass without it arriving, causing him to become alcoholic and depressed. Eventually, the beam returns, enabling him to continue his quest.
- In Green Lantern: Beware My Power, Adam Strange, now voiced by Brian Bloom, meets with the Justice League on Rann and helps them stop the Rann-Thanagar War.
- He reappears in Justice League: Crisis on Infinite Earths - Part Three, voiced again by Brian Bloom.

=== Video games ===
- Adam Strange appears in DC Universe Online.
- Adam Strange appears as a character summon in Scribblenauts Unmasked: A DC Comics Adventure.
- Adam Strange appears as a playable character in Lego DC Super-Villains, voiced by JP Karliak.

=== Miscellaneous ===
- Adam Strange appears in Justice League Adventures.
- Adam Strange appears in Justice League Unlimited #4.
- Adam Strange appears in Young Justice #22.
- Adam Strange appears in Smallville Season 11 as a S.T.A.R. Labs scientist and colleague of Emil Hamilton whose Zeta-Beam technology goes on to contribute towards the Watchtower's construction.
- Adam Strange makes cameo appearances in DC Super Hero Girls.

== Collected editions ==
=== DC Archive Editions ===
Title	Material collected	Year	ISBN
The Adam Strange Archives Volume 1	Showcase #17–19; Mystery in Space #53–65	2004	978-1401201487
The Adam Strange Archives Volume 2	Mystery in Space #66–80	2006	978-1401207809
The Adam Strange Archives Volume 3	Mystery in Space #81–91; Hawkman (vol. 1) #18; Strange Adventures (vol. 1) #157	2008	978-1401216610

=== Other collections ===
Title	Material collected	Year	ISBN
Showcase Presents: Adam Strange Volume 1	Showcase #17-19, Mystery in Space #53-84	2007	978-1401213138
Adam Strange: The Silver Age Omnibus Volume 1	Showcase #17-19, Mystery in Space #53-100, 102, Strange Adventures (vol. 1) #157, 217–218, 220–222, 224, 226, 235, 241–243	2017	978-1401272951
Adam Strange: The Silver Age Volume 1	Showcase #17-19, Mystery in Space #53-79	2019	978-1401285791
Adam Strange: The Man of Two Worlds	Adam Strange (vol. 1) #1-3	2004	978-1401200657
Adam Strange The Man of Two Worlds Deluxe Edition	Adam Strange (vol. 1) #1-3, Who's Who in the DC Universe #6	2018	978-1401277543
Adam Strange: Planet Heist	Adam Strange (vol. 2) #1-8	2005	978-1401207274
Adam Strange: Between Two Worlds	Adam Strange (vol. 1) #1-3, JLA #20-21, Adam Strange (vol. 2) #1-8	2021	978-1779509314
Countdown to Adventure	Countdown to Adventure #1-8	2008	978-1401218232
Strange Adventures	Strange Adventures (vol. 3) #1-8	2010	978-1401226176
Strange Adventures	Strange Adventures (vol. 5) #1-12	2021	978-1779512031

=== Rann/Thanagar War ===
Title	Material collected	Year	ISBN
Rann-Thanagar War	Rann-Thanagar War #1-6	2006	978-1401208394
Rann/Thanagar Holy War Volume 1	Rann Thanagar Holy War #1-4, Hawkman Special	2009	978-1401222543
Rann/Thanagar Holy War Volume 2	Rann Thanagar Holy War #5-8, Adam Strange Special	2009	978-1401225032

== Awards and reception ==
The character and series of the same name have received several awards over the years, including the 1967 and 1968 Alley Awards for Strip Most Desired for Revival. IGN ranked Adam Strange as the 97th greatest comic book hero of all time stating that:

If by fluke we were given the chance to ride a Zeta Beam into space, meet a sexy alien princess on the planet Rann, and fight extraterrestrial threats with high-tech weaponry, I wouldn’t want to go back to mundane Earth-life either. That makes us completely sympathetic to Adam Strange’s plight.
