= Sardath =

Publication information
- Publisher: DC Comics
- First appearance: Showcase #17 (November 1958)
- Created by: Gardner Fox; Mike Sekowsky

In-story information
- Alter ego: Sardath
- Species: Rannian
- Place of origin: Rann
- Partnerships: Adam Strange
- Abilities: Genius-level intellect; Expert engineer with exceptional technological prowess

Sardath is a science fiction character appearing in American comic books published by DC Comics. Created by editor Gardner Fox and Mike Sekowsky, he first appeared in Showcase #17 (November 1958).

== Publication history ==
Sardath was created by Gardner Fox and Mike Sekowsky, first appearing in Showcase #17. However, in The New 52 continuity, Sardath first appeared in Justice League United #2 by Jeff Lemire and Mike McKone.

== Fictional character biography ==
Sardath is a scientist originating from Rann, a planet in the Alpha Centauri system whose residents are indistinguishable from humans. Sardath is known for many of his world's greatest inventions, particularly the Zeta Beam. The Zeta Beam was originally created as a communication device so he could contact other worlds; due to the amount of energy used, it became a teleportation device. The first planet the Zeta Beam reached was Earth, where it struck Adam Strange and transported him to Rann. Sardath is shocked by this, but theorizes that the radiation of the beam will eventually wear off, returning Strange to Earth.

Strange remains with Sardath and his daughter Alanna to protect the planet from extraterrestrial threats using Rann's technology. Eventually, the effects of the beam wear off, returning Strange to Earth. Sardath continues to operate the Zeta Beam and gives Strange a schedule of beam firings, allowing him to return to Rann.

== In other media ==
=== Television ===
- Sardath appears in Batman: The Brave and the Bold, voiced by Richard McGonagle.
- Sardath appears in Young Justice, voiced by W. Morgan Sheppard. This version is incapable of speaking English.
- Sardath appears in Krypton.

=== Film ===
Sardath appears in Green Lantern: Beware My Power, voiced by Simon Templeman.
