= DC Showcase: Adam Strange =

2020 film

- Directed by: Butch Lukic
- Screenplay by: J.M. DeMatteis
- Story by: Butch Lukic
- Based on: Adam Strange by Gardner Fox
- Produced by: Butch Lukic; Amy McKenna
- Starring: Charlie Weber; Kimberly Brooks; Ray Chase; Roger R. Cross; Fred Tatasciore
- Edited by: Christopher D. Lozinski
- Music by: Kevin Riepl
- Production companies: Warner Bros. Animation; DC Entertainment
- Distributed by: Warner Bros. Home Entertainment
- Release date: May 19, 2020
- Running time: 16 minutes

DC Showcase: Adam Strange is a 2020 American animated short superhero film based on the character of the same name produced by Warner Bros. Animation and DC Entertainment. It was included as part of the home media release of Justice League Dark: Apokolips War. The film is also part of the "Tomorrowverse" continuity which begun with Superman: Man of Tomorrow, and is followed by Green Lantern: Beware My Power.

== Plot ==
Adam Strange's origin story is presented in flashbacks. (Note: The film takes place before the events of Green Lantern: Beware My Power.) On the planet Rann, a Thanagarian armada invaded and attacked. (Note: This became known as the First Rannian-Thanagarian War, as explained in Green Lantern: Beware My Power.) Strange's Rannian wife Alanna was killed in the missile strike, and he began searching for his daughter Aleea, in the process being randomly teleported to Eden Corp Mining Colony Number 75 by a Zeta Beam. He swore he would find his way back to Rann and be reunited with Aleea when the Zeta Beam returned. He determines the Beam's arrival by physics, math, and scientific calculations, but years go by, and the beam does not arrive. Vexed, haggard and tired, he gives up, becomes alcoholic, and gets into fights with local colonists, only for a mining foreman to pull him out of trouble because he too has a wife and daughter. The colonists are attacked by bug-like aliens from underground, and the foreman attempts to ask Strange for help, but he is too drunk to do anything, so they leave him in a shelter for safety. When Strange sobers up and see the colony under attack, it reminds him of the attack on Rann and he decides to help. After the aliens are all destroyed, the mine is shut down because of awareness that there could be more aliens, and the surviving miners and their families prepare to leave. The foreman, grateful for Strange saving him and his family during the attack, offers to give him a ride, but he chooses to stay and wait for the inevitable arrival of the Zeta beam. The spaceship leaves and Strange's rocket pack alerts him that the beam has finally arrived, and he can continue his quest for his daughter.

== Cast ==
- Charlie Weber as Adam Strange
- Kimberly Brooks as Alanna, Diane, Meyra
- Ray Chase as Noris
- Roger R. Cross as Foreman
- Fred Tatasciore as Bartender
