= Kanjar Ro =

- Kanjar Ro as depicted in his debut appearance in Justice League of America #3 (February 1961); art by Murphy Anderson.

Publication information
- Publisher: DC Comics
- First appearance: Justice League of America #3 (February 1961)
- Created by: Gardner Fox; Mike Sekowsky

In-story information
- Alter ego: Kanjar Ro
- Place of origin: Dhor
- Team affiliations: R.E.B.E.L.S.
- Abilities: Basic martial art skills, and possessed high tech weaponry, including a "Gamma Gong" that renders people motionless.

Kanjar Ro is a supervillain appearing in comic books published by DC Comics. He is an alien dictator from the planet Dhor and an enemy of the Justice League.

Kanjar Ro has also appeared in various media outside comics. Marc Worden, René Auberjonois, Khary Payton, and Kurtwood Smith have voiced the character in animated series and films.

== Publication history ==
He first appeared in Justice League of America #3 (February 1961) in the story "The Slave Ship of Space", and was created by Gardner Fox and Mike Sekowsky.

== Fictional character biography ==
Kanjar Ro is the dictator of the planet Dhor in the Antares star system, which is at war with three neighboring planets: Alstair, ruled by the plant-like Hyathis; Mosteel, ruled by the metal-skinned Kromm; and Llarr, ruled by the lizard-like Sayyar. In his first appearance, Ro enslaves the Justice League with his Gamma Gong and uses them to battle the other three monarchs by threatening to leave all humanity in a paralyzed state. The League defeats all four monarchs and imprisons them on a small planet around which Green Lantern creates an energy barrier.

Ro escapes after the villains crack the barrier, but leaves them behind. Ro makes several attempts to conquer the planet Rann, prompting the League to team-up with Adam Strange. He first uses radiation from Rann's star to empower himself and nearly defeats the JLA, but Adam defeats him with Dhorite. Ro later creates energy clones of himself and the Justice League before the real League stops him.

Following the Crisis on Infinite Earths continuity reboot, Kanjar Ro is reintroduced in Hawkworld as a plotting bureaucrat on Thanagar. He appears in both Superman and JLA (vol. 3) attempting to conquer planets through force or guile. Ro's sister, Kanjar Ru, appears in Valor as the warden of the prison Starlag II. He later appears in Justice League of America #19 on the prison planet Cygnus 4019. After attempting to capture the League, he reveals that he planned to take control of the villains upon their arrival, only for their teleport beams to be redirected elsewhere.

Kanjar Ro appears in Trinity, having disguised himself as Despero to take his place in a ritual and steal power from Superman, Batman, and Wonder Woman. Although the ritual is successful, granting Morgaine le Fey and Enigma power, Ro gains nothing due to his deception. Revealed as a fake, Ro flees Morgaine and Enigma, but Despero confronts him. He barters the location of the imprisoned Crime Syndicate of Amerika in exchange for leniency; after this, he is ignored when he demands vengeance against Morgaine and is taken to Krona's polar base, from where he radios for the heroes to save himself from Krona. As the Green Lanterns take custody of Despero's armada, Ro reveals he has copied Krona's files and will sell them to the highest bidder.

Kanjar Ro is later seen in Oa's prison cells and works with Kyle Rayner to stop a mass breakout in exchange for a reduced sentence. When the Guardians of the Universe attempt to kill the prisoners, Kyle convinces them to spare Ro due to his earlier actions. After being released from Oa, Ro returns to Dhor and helps Vril Dox's R.E.B.E.L.S. team stop Starro.

== Powers and abilities ==
Kanjar Ro is a cunning strategist and wields advanced alien weaponry. He carries an Energi-Rod that allows him to fly and communicate through hyper-space, as well as a Gamma Gong which can paralyze others when struck.

== Other versions ==
- Kangar-Ro, a funny animal variant of Kanjar Ro from Earth-C-Minus, appears in Captain Carrot and His Amazing Zoo Crew!.
- Kelger Vo, a character based on Kanjar Ro, appears in the League of Extraordinary Gentlemen volume 3 backup feature Minions of the Moon.
- Kanjar Ro appears in JLA/Avengers #4 as a thrall of Krona.

== In other media ==
=== Television ===
Kanjar Ro as he appears in Batman: The Brave and the Bold.

- Kanjar Ro appears in the Justice League episode "In Blackest Night", voiced by René Auberjonois.
- Kanjar Ro appears in Batman: The Brave and the Bold, voiced by Marc Worden. In his most notable appearance in the episode "The Rise of the Blue Beetle!", he captures Gibbles to use them as fuel. Batman and Blue Beetle arrive to stop him so he uses his Gamma Gong to separate the latter from the Blue Beetle scarab to bond with as Blue Beetle until the gong is used to defeat him. In subsequent appearances, Ro fights Batman, among other heroes, alongside space pirates and an army of robots before being killed by an alien creature while attempting to destroy the planet Rann.
- Kanjar Ro appears in Justice League Action, voiced by Khary Payton.

=== Film ===
- Kanjar Ro appears in Green Lantern: First Flight, voiced by Kurtwood Smith. This version is an insectoid alien with squid-like facial features. He allies with Sinestro to obtain the "yellow element" and have the Weaponers of Qward convert it into a Power Ring. Sinestro kills Ro, but briefly resurrects him to learn Qward's location.
- Kanjar Ro makes a non-speaking cameo appearance in Green Lantern: Beware My Power.

=== Video games ===
Kanjar Ro appears as a character summon in Scribblenauts Unmasked: A DC Comics Adventure.

=== Miscellaneous ===
- Kanjar Ro appears in Justice League Adventures #15.
- Kanjar Ro appears in Justice League Unlimited #4.
