= Omega Men =

Fictional characters

- The Omega Men by Pasqual Ferry.

Group publication information
- Publisher: DC Comics
- First appearance: Green Lantern (vol. 2) #141 (June 1981)
- Created by: Marv Wolfman; Joe Staton

In-story information
- Type of organization: Team
- Base(s): Kuraq in the Vegan system
- Agent(s): Tigorr; Broot; Elu; Ryand'r

Omega Men
- : Cover to Omega Men #1 (April 1983), art by Keith Giffen and Mike DeCarlo.

Series publication information
- Schedule: Monthly
- Format: (vol. 1); Ongoing series (vol. 2); Limited series (vol. 3); Limited series
- Genre: Science fiction, superhero
- Publication date: (vol. 1); April 1983 – May 1986 (vol. 2); December 2006 – May 2007 (vol. 3); June 2015 – May 2016
- Number of issues: (vol. 1); 38 (vol. 2); 6 (vol. 3); 12

Creative team
- Writer(s): (vol. 1); Roger Slifer (vol. 2); Andersen Gabrych (vol. 3); Tom King
- Artist(s): (vol. 2); Henry Flint (vol. 3); Barnaby Bagenda
- Penciller(s): (vol. 1); Keith Giffen
- Inker(s): (vol. 1); Mike DeCarlo
- Letterer(s): (vol. 1); John Costanza (vol. 2); Pat Brosseau
- Colorist(s): (vol. 1); Petra Goldberg (vol. 2); Donimic Regan (vol. 3); Romulo Fajardo, Jr
- Creator(s): Marv Wolfman; Joe Staton

The Omega Men are a team of extraterrestrial superheroes who have appeared in various comic book series published by DC Comics. They first appeared in Green Lantern (vol. 2) #141 (June 1981), and were created by Marv Wolfman and Joe Staton.

== Publication history ==
After appearances in Green Lantern, Action Comics and The New Teen Titans, the Omega Men were featured in their own comics series which ran for 38 issues from April 1983 to May 1986. During its run, writer Roger Slifer and artist Keith Giffen created the mercenary anti-hero Lobo. Later creators included writers Doug Moench and Todd Klein (who also lettered later issues in the run), artists Tod Smith, Shawn McManus and Alex Niño, and inkers Mike DeCarlo, Jim McDermott, and Greg Theakston.

Members of the Omega Men also appeared in the 2004 eight-issue Adam Strange limited series, as well as the 2005 Infinite Crisis lead-in 6-issue limited series, Rann–Thanagar War and the 2008 follow-up Rann–Thanagar Holy War.

In 2006, the Omega Men had a solo six-issue limited series with Tigorr, Doc, Elu, Broot, and Ryand'r - written by Andersen Gabrych and art by Henry Flint.

== Fictional team history ==
The Omega Men hail from the Vega system, a planetary system with twenty-five habitable planets, which had been ruled for millennia by the Citadelians, a race of warriors cloned from the First Citadelian, the demi-godlike son of X'Hal.

Cover of Green Lantern (vol. 2) #141, art by George Pérez.

The Citadelians established a tyrannical regime based in a fortress moon known as the Citadel. The Citadel then set about to conquer the younger races of Vega. Originally there were only two races in the Vegan system, the Branx and the Okaarans, but the Psions used Okaaran DNA to create the other twenty-three races of Vega such as the Tamaraneans, Euphorixians, Aelloans, Karnans, and Changralyns.

The Omega Men were assembled as a group of renegades and representatives of conquered Vegan worlds to fight Citadelian aggression. Prior to Infinite Crisis, the team was based on the planet Kuraq. The Omega Men are important peacekeepers in their sector because the Green Lantern Corps is not allowed into Vegan space, due to a long-standing agreement with the Psions.

The Omega Men made a return appearance in the Adam Strange mini-series. Still led by Tigorr, with veteran members Broot, Doc, Elu, Artin and Harpis, they are joined by a group of new members. A vision by one of their new members, a precog, results in them waiting in a Rannian space station for some time; their ultimate purpose to meet Adam Strange. It was in this storyline that the first Doc is discovered to be a Durlan assassin. Doc himself is presumed slain.

In the Omega Men mini-series, it had been revealed that upon returning to the remains of Tamaran with Ryand'e, the Omegans are attacked by the Darkstar zombies of Lady Styx and all but five of them are killed.

=== Alternate versions ===
An alternate future has the Earth taken over by a new Nazi movement. A division of Omega Men participates in a rescue mission and all are killed.

=== Founding members ===
- Primus: A telepath and telekinetic from planet Euphorix. Dies during Invasion! storyline, shot down by guards.
- Kalista: The widow of Primus, sorceress from planet Euphorix.
- Tigorr: Taghurrhu of planet Karna, last of his kind.
- Broot: He originates from a pacifistic society on the planet Changralyn, but was rejected for his violent nature. Broot also possesses superhuman strength and durability.
- Nimbus: A reincarnation of Branx warriors, later planetary guardian of Kuraq.
- Harpis: The sister of Demonia from planet Aello. She is later mutated by the Psions and killed by Lady Styx's Darkstars.
- Demonia: The sister of Harpis from planet Aello. She is later mutated by the Psions and killed by Lady Styx's Darkstars.
- Felicity: The last female of Tigorr's species. She is killed by Durlans during the Invasion! storyline.
- Doc: A bio-organic doctor from Aello. He is killed by Durlan assassins in the Adam Strange mini-series.
- Shlagen: A mechanic from the planet Slagg. He died in battle against Lady Styx.

=== Later members ===
- Elu: A shy energy being and Ryand'r's best friend
- Ryand'r: A Tamaranean and the brother of Starfire, he now goes by the name Darkfire.
- Auron: Lambien of Okaara, son of the goddess X'Hal, godlike energy powers.
- Green Man: A Green Lantern from the planet Uxor. He was killed during the Invasion! storyline.
- Artin: An artificial intelligence created by the Psions who holds a recording of Primus' brain in his memory. He was destroyed by Lady Styx's Darkstars.
- Rynoc: A male warrior from Okaara, deceased.
- Zirral: A female from Old Tamaran.
- Ynda: Kallista's cousin from Euphorix and love interest of Ryand'r, died during Invasion!.
- Oho-Besh: A Changralyn priest, deceased.
- Uhlan: A Gordanian from Karna.
- Seer
- Cecilia
- Dark Flea
- Chantale
- Vandal
- Lianna: A member of the Guardians of the Universe.

=== Other members ===
- Typical
- Outrage
- Doc Rod
- Infinite
- Soap
- Exkurt
- Dark Ord
- Zen
- High Voltage
- Galanta
- Arguth
- Tilian
- Magnum
- Preside
- Folex
- Light Sheperd
- Deka

== The New 52 ==
In The New 52, a modified version of the Omega Men dubbed The Omegas was introduced. The new group consists of young aliens under the tutelage of Zealot. Each of the aliens' parents were enslaved by Lobo, and they are united in seeking revenge on the marauder.

=== The Omegas members ===
- Primus
- Kalista
- Tigorr

== DC You ==
In 2015, as part of the "DC You" revamp of the DC Comics, a new Omega Men series was launched. The new series, which lasted 12 issues, retroactively replaced the previous "New 52" Omega group in canon.

The series, written by Tom King, rebooted the entire story of the Omega Men. In the new canon, the Citadel is now an interplanetary corporation. The Citadel, exploiting the chaos from the destruction of Krypton, has begun selling thousands of worlds rare metal that can be used to "stabilize planetary cores" to prevent a world from exploding like Krypton did. The rare, planetary core stabilizing metal, is only available in the Vega system. The planets of the Vega system as a result, have been enslaved by the alien corporation. Several worlds, whose inhabitants resisted the Citadel, were subjected to genocide: survivors of the genocide from these worlds, became the Omega Men. The group is led by Primus, recast as a wealthy pacifist who was imprisoned by the Citadel to silence him.

Due to the power and influence over thousands of worlds, the Citadel has framed the Omega Men as terrorists and murderers. The reach of the Citadel even ascends to Earth: after making contact with the United States military, they broker a deal to sell them metal from the Vega system, the US Government secretly sends Kyle Rayner to broker a deal with the Citadel at the start of the twelve issue series. However, the head of the Citadel forces Kyle to surrender his white power ring upon meeting him. Shortly afterwards, Kyle is kidnapped by the Omega Men, who fake his death and force Kyle to join them on a tour of the Vega system so he could see the evil of the Citadel and expose their sins.

Kyle eventually realizes the truth about the Citadel and with the Omega Men's help, crash an interview with the head of the Citadel, in order to air recorded footage of the Citadel destroying a planet that had been mined dry of the rare metal. The move clears the Omega Men's good name but fails to stop the Citadel's activities in the Vega system. A final battle between the Citadel and the Omega Men then ensues, ending in the death of the Citadel's leadership caste. Meanwhile, Kyle, who had assumed the alias of "Green Man" during the time with the Omega Men, regains his White Lantern ring and is banished back to Earth by the Omega Men when he fails to convince them to spare the leaders of the Citadel.

=== The Omega Men members ===
- Primus
- Tigorr
- Broot
- DOC
- Scrapps
- Kyle Rayner
- Kalista

== Sources ==
- Omega Men (vol. 1) at the Grand Comics Database
- Omega Men (vol. 2) at the Grand Comics Database
- Omega Men at the Comic Book DB (archived from the original)
