= List of DC Comics characters: A =

== Whisper A'Daire ==
Whisper A'Daire is a character appearing in American comic books published by DC Comics. She was created by Greg Rucka and Shawn Martinbrough, and first appeared in Detective Comics #743 (April 2000).

An operative for the League of Assassins served under its immortal leader Ra's al Ghul, A'Daire was given a serum derived from king cobra DNA that grants her longevity and the ability to shapeshift into a king cobra. A'Daire is accompanied by a small group of men who possess similar shapeshifting abilities to hers. Usually, A'Daire uses mind control to force them to obey her orders, though a stronger mind can break free from hers by clinging to his free will.

A'Daire appears in the series 52 as the manager for HSC International Banking, a company connected with Intergang that distributes futuristic weaponry. Confronted by the Question and Renee Montoya, she is able to flee without giving away other details of her current mission. Using her powers, A'Daire brainwashes kidnapped children into becoming Intergang operatives.

=== Whisper A'Daire in other media ===
- Whisper A'Daire appears in Young Justice, voiced by Grey DeLisle. This version is a member of Intergang and sister of Scorpia A'Daire.
- Whisper A'Daire appears in DC Universe Online, voiced by Jenny Larson. This version is a member of Intergang who possesses telekinesis and control over snakes.
- Whisper A'Daire appears as a character summon in Scribblenauts Unmasked: A DC Comics Adventure.

== Kyle Abbot ==
Kyle Abbot is a character appearing in American comic books published by DC Comics. Created by Greg Rucka and Shawn Martinbrough, he first appeared in Detective Comics #743 (April 2000). He is a member of Intergang and associate of Ra's al Ghul Bruno Mannheim who was given a serum that enables him to transform into a wolf.

=== Kyle Abbot in other media ===
Kyle Abbot appears in DC Universe Online as a member of Intergang.

== Acrata ==
Acrata (Andrea Rojas) is a superheroine appearing in American comic books published by DC Comics who was created as part of the Planet DC annuals event. She first appeared in Superman (vol. 2) Annual #12 (August 2000), and was created by Oscar Pinto, Giovanni Barberi, and F.G. Haghenbeck.

Andrea's father was Bernardo Rojas, once a renowned leader in Central America who researched for "Prehispanic Cultures" at the Universidad Autonoma Metropolitana de Mexico. She later became a vigilante with shadow-manipulating abilities derived from an ancient Mayan symbol representing shadows.

=== Acrata in other media ===
- Andrea Rojas appears in the Smallville episode "Vengeance", portrayed by Denise Quiñones. This version is the daughter of an anti-gang activist, who was killed by gangsters in an attack that led to Andrea receiving a heart transplant and gaining superhuman strength via her new heart's Kryptonite radiation. Following her recovery, she donned a suit and became a vigilante in Metropolis' Suicide Slum in the hopes of finding the gang member who killed her mother. To aid in her quest, she becomes a Daily Planet intern to acquire information and would later be dubbed the "Angel of Vengeance".
- Acrata appears as a character summon in Scribblenauts Unmasked: A DC Comics Adventure.
- Andrea Rojas / Acrata appears in Supergirl, portrayed by Julie Gonzalo as an adult and Alexa Najera as a teenager. This version is a businesswoman and CEO of Obsidian Tech who moonlights as a shadow-based vigilante.
- Acrata appears in the Superman children's novel The Shadow Masters, written by Paul Kupperberg and published by Capstone Publishers.

== Acid Master ==
Acid Master (Phillip Master) is a character appearing in American comic books published by DC Comics. Created by Jim Shooter and Wayne Boring, he first appeared in Action Comics #348 (March 1967).

He is a chemist and saboteur who allied with forces behind the Iron Curtain.

=== Acid Master in other media ===
Acid Master appears in The Flash episode "Failure is an Orphan", portrayed by John Gillich. This version is an acid-generating metahuman.

== Alchemist ==
Alchemist is the name of several characters in DC Comics.

=== Arthur Norris ===
Arthur Norris is a criminal who uses a black box in his bank robberies. With the black box, Norris can generate intense heat, which he uses to break into vaults.

=== Zobar Zodiak ===
Zobar Zodiak is a scientific genius who mastered chemistry, mechanics, and occult magic, calling himself Alchemist. While attempting to escape from the Justice Society, his airplane crashed. Zodiak was teleported to the time of World War II as the result of an experiment by Per Degaton, who later called Zodiak an "Alchemist Supreme". When his plans fail, Per Degaton returns Zodiak and his other allies to their original times.

== Aerie ==
- First appearance: Suicide Squad (vol. 6) #1 (February 2020)
- Created by: Tom Taylor and Bruno Redondo
- Abilities: Wings and flight

The Aerie, is a character, a terrorist in the DC Comics universe. They are gender non-binary. They first appeared in Suicide Squad (vol. 6) #1 (February 2020), and were created by Tom Taylor and Bruno Redondo.

== Agamemno ==
Agamemno is a supervillain appearing in American comic books published by DC Comics. He first appeared in Silver Age #1 (July 2000) during the Silver Age event, a series of Silver Age-styled one-shots of which he was the chief antagonist. He was created by Mark Waid.

Agamemno is the son of the first sentient being to be created after the Big Bang. His father ruled the universe for eons before being deposed and killed by a group of younger cosmic entities. Agamemno allies with the Injustice League, whose members are promised control of Earth in exchange for helping Agamemno conquer the universe. Agamemno uses his powers to swap the minds of the JLA with the villains, who acquire three items he needs to become all-powerful: the Absorbascon, a piece of crystal kryptonite, and the central power battery of Oa. The villains succeed in securing the items Agememno required (despite being driven back into their own bodies). The villains threaten to destroy the JLA with the knowledge they had learned about them, but are ultimately defeated when the JLA members use the H-Dial to become new superheroes of which no one had any knowledge. Agamemno is defeated by the JLA and trapped inside the central power battery.

== Agent "!" ==
Agent "!" (Malcolm DuPont) is a homeless man from Venice, Italy, who is able to have a form of invisibility for him and people around him, by becoming essentially unnoticeable despite his ostentatious outfit decorated with exclamation marks and having a gilded cage in the chest with a miniature jet with bird-like feet. He was on a quest to find the element of surprise, ultimately finding it when dying in a battle against the government.

=== Agent "!" in other media ===
Agent "!" appears in the third season of Doom Patrol, portrayed by Micah Joe Parker.

== Michael Akins ==
Michael Akins is a member of the Gateway City Police Department. In his earlier days, Akins had a traumatic experience with Watchdog where the vigilante and the kidnap victim ended up dead. When he moved to Gotham City, he became a trusted police officer working under James Gordon during the "No Man's Land" crisis. When Gordon was shot, Akins became the new police commissioner.

In 2016, DC Comics implemented another relaunch of its books called "DC Rebirth" which restored its continuity to a form much as it was pritor to "The New 52". Michael Akins is depicted as the mayor of Gotham City.

=== Michael Akins in other media ===
Michael Akins appears in Batwoman, portrayed by Chris Shields. This version is Gotham City's mayor in the first and second seasons before being succeeded by Mayor Hartley in the third.

== Alanna ==
Alanna is a character appearing in American comic books published by DC Comics. Created by Gardner Fox and Mike Sekowsky, she first appeared in Showcase #17 (December 1958).

Alanna is Sardath's daughter and Adam Strange's primary love interest, who he meets after being teleported to Rann. However, the temporary nature of the Zeta beams that brought him there means that they cannot remain together permanently. Sardath creates an improved Zeta beam that will not return Adam to Earth, enabling him to stay with Alanna. The two have a daughter, Aleea.

=== Alanna in other media ===
- Alanna appears in Batman: The Brave and the Bold, voiced by Cathy Cavadini.
- Alanna appears in Young Justice, voiced by Jacqueline Obradors.
- Alanna appears in DC Showcase: Adam Strange, voiced by Kimberly Brooks. This version was killed in a Thanagarian attack.

== Alias the Blur ==
Ilse Krauss was a mentally ill actress who fell in love with her own reflection, eventually making the reflection to become alive. Due to the changes in the reflection as Kraus aged, she eventually believed that her lover had been replaced, so she scarred it with acid, and shoot herself, kept alive only with machinery.

The reflection survived, and calling itself Alias the Blur became a member of the second iteration of the Brotherhood of Dada, gathered by Mr. Nobody, with the power of accelerating other people's age. However, it is eventually freed from existence in the battle against the government, as both Kraus and the tortured reflection die.

== All-Star ==
- First appearance: Justice League Adventures #13 (January 2003)
- Created by: Dan Slott · Min S. Ku

All-Star (Olivia Dawson) is a superheroine appearing in American comic books published by DC Comics. She is a young girl with an alien Star Charm who became a reserve member for the Justice League.

== Henry Allen ==
Henry Allen is the father of Barry Allen / The Flash and Cobalt Blue and the husband of Nora Allen. He was created by John Broome and Carmine Infantino, and first appeared in The Flash #126 (February 1962). He was initially depicted as an obscure character, and was featured in a storyline where the Top possessed his body. His character's story changed in The Flash: Rebirth, where Professor Zoom / Reverse-Flash framed Henry for murdering Nora, leading Barry to become obsessed with finding the real killer in hopes of freeing Henry from prison. Henry died in prison before Barry became the Flash, but his son posthumously clears his name. The New 52 rebooted DC's continuity, where Henry is freed while still alive.

=== Henry Allen in other media ===
- Henry Allen appears in The Flash (1990), portrayed by M. Emmet Walsh.
- Henry Allen appears in The Flash (2014), portrayed by John Wesley Shipp.
  - The Earth-1 version is a doctor who spends the first season in prison until Eobard Thawne confesses to murdering Nora Allen before Henry is killed by Zoom in the second season.
  - Additionally, his Earth-3 counterpart Jay Garrick / Flash appears as well.
- Henry Allen appears in the DC Extended Universe (DCEU) films Justice League (2017), Zack Snyder's Justice League (2021) and The Flash (2023), portrayed by Billy Crudup in the former and Ron Livingston in the latter. This version was freed from prison thanks to the time-travel actions of his son Barry, which altered the past and the future in return.

== Nora Allen ==
- First appearance: The Flash #126 (February 1962)

Nora Allen is the mother of Barry Allen and Malcolm Thawne and the wife of Henry Allen. She was created by John Broome and Carmine Infantino, and first appeared in The Flash #126 (February 1962). She was initially an obscure character, but her character's story changed in The Flash: Rebirth, where the Reverse-Flash kills her and frames Henry.

=== Nora Allen in other media ===
- Nora Allen appears in The Flash (1990), portrayed by Priscilla Pointer.
- Nora Allen appears in Justice League: The Flashpoint Paradox, voiced by Grey Griffin.
- Nora Allen appears in The Flash (2014), portrayed by Michelle Harrison.
  - The Earth-1 version, based on her New 52 incarnation, inspired Barry Allen and was killed by the Reverse-Flash.
  - Additionally, her Earth-3 counterpart Joan Williams appears as well.
- Nora Allen appears in The Flash (2023), portrayed by Maribel Verdú.

== Harold Allnut ==
- First appearance: The Question #33 (December 1989)
- Created by: Dennis O'Neil; Alan Grant

Harold Allnut is a character appearing in stories published by DC Comics, in particular those featuring Batman. He is a mute and kyphotic man who serves as a trusted mechanic and aide to Batman, helping to design, build, and repair that superhero's equipment. Created by writers Dennis O'Neil and Alan Grant, the character first appeared in The Question #33 (December 1989).

Harold is a mute hunchbacked man who is expelled from his house in Gotham City and subsequently travels to Hub City.

His first appearance in a Batman comic occurs the first part of the story arc Penguin Affair. Harold is initially cast as a henchman for the Penguin, who had conned Harold to work for him and build deadly machines with which he could threaten Gotham City. Months after putting an end to Penguin's scheme, Batman finds Harold in an abandoned building and saves him from a mob of angry parents who have mistaken him for a child molester due to his appearance.

After rescuing Harold, Batman gives him a home and a position in the Batcave, working as a technological aide in his war on crime. A diary entry in 'The Batman Files' explains Alfred's first encounter with Harold. The newcomer is delighted to have advanced technology to work with while Alfred has doubts. Batman explains Harold's poor living conditions and Alfred is pleased at Harold's rescue.

In the storyline Hush, Harold had been tricked by the title character into undergoing surgery to repair his voice and his stature. In exchange, Harold was made to place a hidden circuitry relay onto the Batcave's main computer which gave off subliminal signals which affected Batman's mind. Harold attempts to reveal Hush's identity to Batman, but is killed by Hush. Harold was resurrected following the "DC Rebirth" relaunch.

== Alpha Centurion ==
Alpha Centurion is the name of three superheroes published by DC Comics. Created by Karl Kesel, the character first appeared in Zero Hour: Crisis in Time! #3 (September 1994).

=== Marcus Aelius ===
Marcus was a normal human who had been taken by aliens into space. He was granted access to incredible knowledge and advanced technology. In addition to his spacecraft the Pax Romana, Marcus' advanced suit of alien armor allows him to fly, grants him superhuman strength and speed, and allows him to generate an energy blade, similar to a lightsaber, and an energy shield.

==== Alpha Centurion A ====
During the Zero Hour: Crisis in Time! storyline, Superman is transported to an alternate timeline and meets its version of Marcus Aurelius. This version of the character is erased after the universe is rebooted.

==== Alpha Centurion B ====
Another alternate version of Marcus Aelius / Alpha Centurion appears in The Final Night storyline. This version is the champion of the Virmiru, an alien species who would visit worlds and exchange a champion of the world with one of their own, with the ultimate goal of conquering that world. The exchange was to appear as an act of friendship while the alien that remained would gain trust and ascertain weaknesses. After the champion is returned, the planet would be deemed ripe for conquest. Aelius celebrated a victory he led for the Roman legion under Emperor Hadrian when the Virmiru appeared on Earth. They proposed their offer and a global contest was held until Aelius emerged as Earth's greatest warrior. He would go to the Virmiru homeworld where he trained beside many other alien races in many fields including using the power suit employed by their hosts. All the while, the Virmiru Foris Ab Talimen remained on Earth for 2,000 years awaiting the return of Aelius. When his training was completed, the Virmiru gave Aelius the space ship Pax Romana he would use to return to his planet. After some time acting as a superhero in Washington, the Virmiru Interstellar Affairs Councilor Bellator contacted Aelius and told him Foris had gone rogue. When confronted, Foris told Alpha Centurion the truth about his race and the pair went to battle Bellator. Though perishing in the battle, Bellator admitted the Virmiru's objectives and revealed the invasion forthcoming.

=== Roman ===
A new Alpha Centurion was introduced in the Doomed series. During a terrorist attack at a museum in Metropolis, a college student named Roman used a belt from an exhibit as a tourniquet for his leg after he was shot. This allowed an ancient god, the Alpha Centurion of the Pantheon of Grace, to take over his body and defeat the terrorists. Afterwards, the Alpha Centurion would continue to take over Roman's body at different times, acting as a superhero in Metropolis, though Roman is scared that one day the Centurion will not give him his body back.

== Edwin Alva ==
Edwin Alva is a character appearing in comic books published by Milestone Comics and DC Comics. He first appeared in Hardware #1 and was created by Dwayne McDuffie and Denys Cowan.

Edwin Alva Sr, is the president of Alva Technologies, and one of the leading inventors of his time. Alva became interested in 12 year old Curtis Metcalf, a gifted but poor African-American teenager, and became his sponsor and mentor. Alva pays for Metcalf to attend college and eventually employs him as an inventor. When Metcalf attempts to have Alva share his profits with him, Alva declares that he owns Metcalf's ideas and the rights to his current and future products. Enraged by this treatment, Metcalf investigates and discovers that Alva is heavily involved in organized crime. After attempts to use official channels to expose Alva's past failed, Metcalf decided to take on Alva directly, becoming the superhero Hardware.

Alva eventually discovers that Metcalf is Hardware and confronts him. Instead of using the information to destroy Hardware, Alva pointed out the moral grey area that both he and Metcalf inhabited, and that they had both used the ends to justify the means. Alva offers Metcalf the position of vice-president at Alva Industries, helping Metcalf to develop a new version of the Hardware armor.

Several years later, Alva intends to retire in order to devote himself to charitable activities. Shortly afterwards, Alva is killed while saving several people from being crushed to death.

=== Edwin Alva in other media ===
Edwin Alva appears in Static Shock, voiced by Kerrigan Mahan. This version is neglectful and contemptuous of his son Edward Alva Jr. Intending to take revenge on his father, Alva Jr. uses the mutagenic gas created by Alva Sr.'s company to give himself superpowers. During a confrontation with Static, Alva Jr. inadvertently petrifies himself after using too much of the gas. In the fourth season, Static and Hot-Streak help Alva Sr. revive Alva Jr. after learning of his efforts to do so.

== Amazing Grace ==
Amazing Grace is a New God and the sister of Glorious Godfrey. A loyal agent of Darkseid, she lives among the lowlies of Apokolips, pretending to preach opposition to Darkseid's word and encourages the lowlies to revolt. When they do, they are easily defeated, crushing their revolt and their spirits.

After Superman (in his civilian guise as Clark Kent) was transported to Apokolips, Grace was "captured" by Darkseid's troops and was to be thrown into the firepits; all to lure Superman out. He saved her, but he himself fell into the fire pits. He survived, but with no memory or powers. It was implied that Grace seduced Superman on behalf of Darkseid, and convinced the Man of Steel that he was Darkseid's son. Superman was given his powers back when he allied himself with Darkseid and led Darkseid's forces into battle. Serving Darkseid, Superman went into battle against Darkseid's true son Orion who used the powers of the Mother Box to restore Superman's memories while erasing his knowledge of, and guilt over, the thousands that had died because of his actions under Grace's influence.

== Americommando ==
Americommando is an alias used by several characters appearing in comic books published by DC Comics.

=== Tex Thompson ===
Harry "Tex" Thompson was the first Americommando.

=== Other versions of Americommando ===
- In Freedom Fighters #7 (March 1977), the villain Silver Ghost poses as a hero and calls himself Americommando. In his role, he becomes leader of the Crusaders. The story intentionally painted Americommando and his team as a parody of Captain America and the Invaders of Marvel Comics.
- In Lord Havok and the Extremists #1–6, an Earth-8 version of Americommando is leader of a group called the Meta-Militia, an analogue of the Avengers. Like the Silver Ghost version, he seems to be a satire of Marvel's Captain America.
- In Uncle Sam and the Freedom Fighters, an agent of S.H.A.D.E. operates under the Americommando name and lead's a field team for the organization. He opposes the heroic Freedom Fighters and kills his own speedster teammate Spin Doctor for talking back to him.
- In the alternate reality of Kingdom Come, a minor terrorist calling himself Americommando demands the halting of all immigration to the United States after the destruction of Kansas. It is later implied that he, and new versions of the DC characters called Minutemen, acted under the control of the villains called Braintrust.

== Amon Hakk ==
Amon Hakk is a character appearing in American comic books published by DC Comics.

Amon Hakk is a Khund warrior who applied for to become a member of the L.E.G.I.O.N. team. He had an uneasy relationship with Vril Dox, from teammates to enemies, and became a mercenary and bounty hunter tasked with chasing Dox, until apprehended by Ciji.

== Amygdala ==
Amygdala (Aaron Helzinger) is an enemy of Batman who has reduced mental capacity, near superhuman strength and endurance, and is prone to outbursts of violence due to medical experimentation on his brain, chiefly the removal of his amygdala. Helzinger's amygdala cluster was removed in an attempt to cure him of his homicidal rage. This procedure resulted in Helzinger becoming exceedingly angry and was the opposite of what the surgery was intended to achieve. Easily led due to his childlike nature, Amygdala has been the pawn of a number of Batman villains, but when properly medicated, he can be peaceful.

=== Amygdala in other media ===
- Aaron Helzinger appears in Gotham, portrayed by Stink Fisher. This version is an inmate of Arkham Asylum.
- Aaron Helzinger appears in the Batwoman episode "Do Not Resuscitate", portrayed by R. J. Fetherstonhaugh. This version is a mentally-unstable patient of Hamilton Dynamics.

== Angle Man ==
The Angle Man is a character appearing in American comic books published by DC Comics. Angle Man was created by Robert Kanigher and Harry G. Peter, and first appeared in Wonder Woman #70 (November 1954).

Angle Man was an unsuccessful criminal who became obsessed with crimes with unbeatable "angles". He plagued Wonder Woman with a series of increasingly clever schemes involving "angles".

He reappeared, now wearing a yellow and green costume and wielding the Angler, a Penrose triangle which could warp time and space. Angle Man was recruited and outfitted by the Secret Society of Super Villains's founder Darkseid, only to use the Angler to warp ahead in time to a point after Darkseid had been exposed and deposed as the Society's secret leader.

During Phil Jimenez's run on the Wonder Woman title, Angle Man was reimagined as Angelo Bend, an Italian thief who uses his Angler to escape authorities. He was caught by Donna Troy while trying to steal an ancient artifact from a museum. Even though Donna, as Troia, was trying to stop the villain, the Angle Man developed a crush on her.

In The New 52 continuity reboot, Angle Man is depicted as the son of Vandal Savage.

=== Angle Man in other media ===
- Angle Man appears in Justice League Unlimited, voiced by an uncredited Phil LaMarr. This version is a member of Gorilla Grodd's Secret Society until he is killed by Darkseid.
- Angle Man makes a non-speaking cameo appearance in the Batman: The Brave and the Bold episode "Joker: The Vile and the Villainous!".
- Angle Man appears as a character summon in Scribblenauts Unmasked: A DC Comics Adventure.
- Angle Man appears in Super Friends #28.
- Angle Man appears in All-New Batman: The Brave and the Bold #4.
- Angle Man makes a cameo appearance in Wonder Woman '77 #4.

== Anima ==
Anima (Courtney Mason) is a superheroine appearing in American comic books published by DC Comics, who starred in the comic book series of the same name. The character was created and written by science fiction and fantasy authors Elizabeth Hand and Paul Witcover.

During the Bloodlines event, Courtney is kidnapped by a cult and possessed by the Animus, gaining energy-draining abilities. As Anima, Courtney sought revenge against the cult. She also met the Teen Titans and battled a variety of supernatural menaces.

In 1993, Anima received a solo series that ran for 16 months before being cancelled due to low sales. The series had a huge supporting cast, both human and supernatural – in some issues, Anima herself appeared for only a few pages. Courtney's younger brother Jeremy Mason becomes the channel for Animus' evil sister, Eris (Eris shares her name with a goddess of Greek mythology, who herself appeared in DC's Wonder Woman title, second series). Animus and Eris ultimately combine as the Syzygy, to fight their father/enemy known only as The Nameless One. Fellow DC superheroes Superboy and Hawkman also guest-starred – with Superboy temporarily acting as a channel for an archetype called The Warrior.

Anima later joins the Blood Pack alongside Gunfire, Hook and Argus before being killed by Prometheus.

== Anomaly ==
Anomaly is the name of several characters appearing in American comic books published by DC Comics.

=== Floyd Barstow clone ===
Project Cadmus made a clone of convicted murderer Floyd "Bullets" Barstow. After a fight with a person named Misa, the slight scratches on his right hand become inflamed and his powers manifest. He believes this 'evil' comes from his original DNA source.

After escaping from Cadmus, he joins the Superman Revenge Squad.

Moxie Mannheim's Intergang branch easily gets him out of prison and Anomaly begins working with the group. Intergang's mission to kill Cadmus' protector Guardian fails when Anomaly experiences a change of heart by taking on the properties of the chains around Guardian when Dabney Donovan wanted to operate on Guardian. He helps protect Guardian by pretending to fight him and collapse the building, allowing Mannheim's gang and Donovan to evacuate. Guardian emerges from the building and captures Anomaly, intending to return him to Project Cadmus.

=== O.T.A.C. 13 ===
O.T.A.C. 13 is the result of the O.T.A.C. virus being experimented on by Silas Stone.

== Ant ==
Ant (Eddie Whit) is a character appearing in American comic books published by DC Comics. He was created by Bob Haney and Nick Cardy and first appeared in Teen Titans #5 (October 1966).

Ant is a costumed enemy of the Teen Titans.

== Anti-Fate ==
Anti-Fate (Benjamin Stoner) is a character appearing in American comic books published by DC Comics. The character was created by J.M. DeMatteis and Keith Giffen and first appeared in Doctor Fate #1 (July 1987).

Benjamin Stoner is a former psychiatrist who became an enemy of Doctor Fate after being possessed by Typhon of the Lords of Chaos. Before he was corrupted by Typhon, Benjamin Stoner was a chief psychiatrist at Arkham Asylum in Gotham City. After an encounter with Doctor Fate, Stoner was freed from the influence of the Lords of Order and Chaos.

=== Anti-Fate in other media ===
Benjamin Stoner appears in Joker, portrayed by Frank Wood. This version is Penny Fleck's therapist at Arkham State Hospital.

== Aquababy ==
Arthur Curry Jr., also known as Aquababy, is a character appearing in American comic books published by DC Comics. He was created by Nick Cardy, and first appeared in Aquaman #23 (October 1965).

Arthur is the son of Aquaman (Arthur Curry Sr.) and Mera. He was killed by Black Manta in Adventure Comics #452 (August 1977) and has remained dead since, though he was temporarily resurrected as a Black Lantern in Blackest Night.

=== Aquababy in other media ===
- Arthur Jr. appears in the Justice League episode "The Enemy Below".
- Arthur Jr. appears in Batman: The Brave and the Bold, voiced by Preston Strother.
- Arthur Jr. appears in Young Justice, voiced by Kath Soucie.
- Arthur Jr. appears in Aquaman and the Lost Kingdom, portrayed by several uncredited infant actors.

== Archer ==
Archer is an alias used by several characters appearing in American comic books published by DC Comics.

=== Usil ===
Usil the Sun Archer is from Naples during fascist Italy. A counterpart of Green Arrow, he combines extraordinary archery skills with a variety of standard and trick arrows, and a member of Axis Amerika.

=== Quigley ===
Quigley was born into a life of wealth. He wanted to be a big game hunter, but an argument with his father left him cut off from the family fortune. Quigley was left with a taste of the high life with no way to pay for it. At this point, Quigley decided to put his big game skills to the test where he made use of his bow and some trick arrows. Archer was eventually defeated by Superman, arrested by the police, convicted on several accounts of murder, and given a stiff prison sentence.

Some years later, Archer escaped from prison with a new arsenal of tricks. He attempted to get revenge on Superman which failed as he was defeated by Superman and Jimmy Olsen. He was returned to prison after that.

=== The New 52 version ===
"The New 52" features an unidentified person who took up the Archer alias while wearing a red hoodie and a green mask while wielding a bow and trick arrows. During the "Forever Evil" storyline, Archer found the Rogues fleeing from the Crime Syndicate and shot the Trickster in the foot with one of his arrows. While planning to make a name of himself and turn the Rogues over to the Crime Syndicate for a reward, Archer was knocked unconscious by the Rogues. Archer was among the villains who accompanied Gorilla Grodd in attacking the Rogues.

=== Archer in other media ===
- An original incarnation of Archer appears in Batman (1966), portrayed by Art Carney.
- The Batman (1966) incarnation of Archer appears in the Batman: The Brave and the Bold episode "Day of the Dark Knight!".
- An alternate universe incarnation of Archer appears in Justice League: Crisis on Two Earths, voiced by Jim Meskimen.

== Argus ==
Argus is a superhero appearing in American comic books published by DC Comics. He first appeared during the Bloodlines crossover event in The Flash (vol. 2) Annual #6 (1993), and was created by Mark Waid and Phil Hester. While investigating one of Keystone City's criminal organisations using the alias "Nick Kovac", federal agent Nick Kelly was attacked by a Bloodlines Parasite named Venev, gaining the ability to become invisible in shadow and see in multiple spectrums of vision.

== Amadeus Arkham ==
Amadeus Arkham is a character in DC Comics. He was the founder of Arkham Asylum and is the uncle of Jeremiah Arkham.

Arkham was created in 1984 for the entry for Arkham Asylum in Who's Who: The Definitive Directory of the DC Universe #1. The story was retold and expanded in 1989 in Arkham Asylum: A Serious House on Serious Earth. The graphic novel is interspersed with flashbacks to Arkham's life and childhood. The character appeared in DC's The New 52 as a protagonist of All Star Western alongside Jonah Hex.

The Who's Who entry establishes that the Asylum was named after Elizabeth Arkham, the mother of founder Amadeus Arkham. The original name of the asylum was Arkham Hospital. Its dark history began in the early 1900s when Arkham's mother, having suffered from mental illness most of her life, committed suicide (it was later revealed that her son actually euthanized her and repressed the memory). Amadeus Arkham decided, then, as the sole heir to the Arkham estate, to remodel his family home and properly treat the mentally ill. Prior to the period of the hospital's remodeling, Arkham treated patients at the State Psychiatric Hospital in Metropolis, where he, his wife Constance and daughter Harriet had been living for quite some time.

Upon telling his family of his plans, they moved back to his family home to oversee the remodeling. While there, Arkham received a call from the police notifying him that serial killer Martin Hawkins — referred to Arkham by Metropolis Penitentiary while at State Psychiatric Hospital — had escaped from prison, and sought his considered opinion on the murderer's state of mind. Shortly afterward, Arkham returned to his home to find his front door wide open. Inside, he discovered the mutilated bodies of his wife and daughter in an upstairs room with Hawkins' nickname carved on Harriet's body.

The shock of the murders brings back the memory of killing his mother. For many years, Elizabeth suffered delusions that she was being tormented by a supernatural creature and would call to her son to protect her. One day, however, he finally sees what his mother saw – a great bat, a spectre of death. Taking a pearl-handled straight razor from his pocket, he cuts his mother's throat to end her suffering. He then blocks out the memory and attributes her death to suicide.

Traumatized, Amadeus puts on his mother's wedding dress and takes out the pearl-handled razor. It is vaguely implied that Arkham cannibalizes his family's remains in a shamanic ritual. Kneeling in the blood of his family, he vows to bind the evil spirit of "The Bat", which he believes inhabits the house, through ritual and sorcery. He treats Hawkins for months until finally electrocuting him in a shock therapy session. This incident is treated as an accident by the authorities. Soon after, Arkham freefalls into madness. He continues his mission even after he is incarcerated in the Asylum himself after trying to kill his stockbroker in 1929; he scratches the words of a binding spell into the walls and floor of his cell with his fingernails and constantly belts out "The Star-Spangled Banner" in a loud voice until the day he dies.

In The New 52 reboot, Amadeus Arkham is re-established as having been the partner of Jonah Hex. Amadeus is a psychologist who specializes in criminal behavior and lives in a mansion with his mother. Amadeus works with Hex in an effort to solve a series of murders committed by the Gotham Ripper and uncovers a child slavery operation run by the Court of Owls.

=== Amadeus Arkham in other media ===
- Amadeus Arkham appears in Batman: Arkham Asylum, voiced by Tom Kane.
- A statue of Amadeus Arkham appears in the Arkham Asylum stage in Injustice 2.

== Arkham Knight ==
The Arkham Knight is a character in DC Comics. Created by Peter Tomasi and Doug Mahnke, she first appeared in Detective Comics #1000 (May 2019).

During the DC Rebirth slate, to commemorate the eightieth anniversary of the Batman mythos in 2019, DC Comics debuted an iteration of the Arkham Knight character inspired by the 2015 video game Batman: Arkham Knight. Taking place within the mainstream DC Universe, separate from the continuity of the Batman: Arkham games, this version is the founder of the Knights of the Sun, a cult of Arkham Asylum inmates devoted to ridding Gotham City of Batman. The Arkham Knight is revealed to be Astrid Arkham, the daughter of doctors Jeremiah Arkham, the nephew of the asylum's founder Amadeus Arkham; and Ingrid Karlsson, a kind-hearted woman well liked by even the most dangerous patients.

Astrid was born during a riot at the asylum, during which Ingrid was killed by a batarang thrown by an inmate. After being delivered safely with the help of the Joker, Harley Quinn, Poison Ivy, Clayface, and Solomon Grundy, Astrid was raised and homeschooled by Jeremiah in the asylum. She befriended the incarcerated supervillains and would sit outside the Joker's cell to read fairy tales with him, growing to idolize the knights in these stories. Astrid developed a grudge against Batman and saw him as a demon that tormented her friends. This grudge turned into hatred when she uncovered video tapes of Ingrid being struck by a batarang. Believing that Batman had murdered her mother, Astrid trained to become a skilled fighter and, inspired by the knights in her bedtime stories, rechristened herself as the Arkham Knight to seek revenge against Batman.

During Infinite Frontier, Astrid is killed in a raid on the Asylum by Simon Saint. She is later resurrected as a zombie and joins the Suicide Squad's Task Force Z team.

=== Arkham Knight in other media ===
An original incarnation of the Arkham Knight appears in Batman: Arkham Knight as the titular alias utilized by Jason Todd. Additionally, Todd as the Arkham Knight appears as a playable character in the mobile version of Injustice: Gods Among Us.

== Arm-Fall-Off-Boy ==
Arm-Fall-Off Boy

Publication information
- Publisher: DC Comics
- First appearance: Secret Origins #46 (December 1989)
- Created by: Gerard Jones; Curt Swan

In-story information
- Alter ego: Floyd Belkin
- Team affiliations: Legion of Super-Heroes; Heroes of Lallor
- Notable aliases: Splitter
- Abilities: Can remove his limbs and use them as clubs

Arm-Fall-Off-Boy (Floyd Belkin) is a superhero from the 30th century, appearing in American comic books published by DC Comics. His first appearance was in Secret Origins #46 (December 1989). He was created by writer Gerard Jones and artist Curt Swan, who based him on a fan parody character. After the 1994 "Zero Hour" storyline, the character of Arm-Fall-Off-Boy was briefly reintroduced as Splitter.

Arm-Fall-Off-Boy has the ability to detach his own limbs, which he can then use as weapons. His background is not explored in his initial appearances; in Legionnaires #12, Matter-Eater Lad claims he gained his powers through carelessness while holding the anti-gravity metal Element 152, but Matter-Eater Lad may not have been serious. In his introduction, he is an applicant at the first Legion tryout, and the first Legion reject.

Following the Zero Hour: Crisis in Time! reboot, the character is identified as Floyd Belkin of the planet Lallor. Under the name Splitter, Floyd participates in the Legion's tryouts in Legionnaires #43 and is one of five finalists, but he is denied Legion membership after he panics and literally falls apart during the last test. Later in the comic, he appears as a member of the Heroes of Lallor.

=== Arm-Fall-Off-Boy in other media ===
- A character based on Arm-Fall-Off-Boy named Cory Pitzner / The Detachable Kid (T.D.K.) appears in The Suicide Squad, portrayed by Nathan Fillion. This version is a member of the eponymous team and is able to telekinetically control his detached limbs.
- Arm-Fall-Off-Boy appears in Legion of Super-Heroes, voiced by Benjamin Diskin. This version is a student of the Legion Academy.
- Arm-Fall-Off Boy appears as a character summon in Scribblenauts Unmasked: A DC Comics Adventure.
- Arm-Fall-Off Boy appears in Legion of Super Heroes in the 31st Century #16.

== Arsenal ==
Arsenal is the name of several characters appearing in media published by DC Comics.

=== Second version ===
The second Arsenal is an enemy of the Doom Patrol. He is a mercenary who pilots a mechanical suit loaded with weapons.

==== Arsenal in other media ====
The second incarnation of Arsenal appears in the Batman: The Brave and the Bold episode "The Last Patrol!", voiced by Fred Tatasciore.

=== Nicholas Galtry ===
Nicholas Galtry is the legal guardian of Garfield Logan / Beast Boy and seeks to acquire his inheritance. Galtry hires the second Arsenal in an attempt to kill Beast Boy, which fails. Following Arsenal's defeat, Galtry takes the Arsenal armor for himself to attack Beast Boy with as the fourth Arsenal.

=== Third version ===
A third Arsenal fought Chris King and Vicki Grant. This version was created by Robby Reed and is a member of the Evil Eight.

== Asmodel ==
Asmodel is a fallen angel, a supervillain, and a comic book character published by DC Comics. He is based on the Asmodel of Christian theology, the guardian angel of people born in the sign of Taurus. Asmodel first appeared in JLA #7, and was created by Grant Morrison and Howard Porter.

=== Fictional character biography ===
Asmodel is a King-Angel of the Bull Host of Heaven (the other three being Human, Eagle and Lion), and a general in the army of the Presence. His bull-like appearance is inspired by the astrological Asmodel, the guardian angel of people born in the sign of Taurus and the angel of May. Hoping to succeed where Lucifer failed, he planned to overthrow the Presence and claim the title of the Ruler over the Heavens. However, guardian angel Zauriel accidentally found out about Asmodel's plans. Zauriel, who had fallen in love with the woman he was tasked to protect, pleaded to be sent to Earth as a mortal, hoping to evade Asmodel as well as contact his beloved.

Asmodel and Neron soon lead an attack on Heaven itself, making their way to Heaven's throne room. Finding the room empty, Asmodel learns that the Presence is omnipresent and thus unconquerable.

=== Powers and abilities of Asmodel ===
Asmodel has powerful reality-warping powers that can change the face of the world by force of will. He possesses telepathy and telekinesis, and can manipulate psionic energy, control the minds of others, and transform energy and matter. Asmodel can also project heavenly light from his eyes, driving all but the purest souls insane.

=== Asmodel in other media ===
Asmodel appears as a character summon in Scribblenauts Unmasked: A DC Comics Adventure.

== Asteria ==
Asteria is an ancient Amazon and friend of Arion of ancient Atlantis. She appeared in the 2018 issues Justice League/Aquaman: Drowned Earth Special #1 and Justice League #11.

In the present, Wonder Woman informs Aquaman that Asteria was an ancient Amazon who fought against the gods.

=== Asteria in other media ===
Asteria appears in Wonder Woman 1984, portrayed by Lynda Carter. This version helped free the Amazons from slavery, enabling them to escape and found Themyscira.

== Atlan ==
- First appearance: The Atlantis Chronicles #5 (July 1990)
- Created by: Peter David and Esteban Maroto
- Further reading: Atlan at the Comic Book DB (archived from the original)

Atlan is a mage from ancient Atlantis in the DC Universe.

Atlan is a member of the Homo magi offshoot of humanity born in ancient Atlantis. While within the lineage of the Atlantian royal house, his spirit interacts with the past generation to father Aquaman, the Ocean Master and Deep Blue. He also acts as a mentor in magic to Aqualad.

After being in a coma for six months and soon discovering the Dead King's origins with the help of Nuidis Vulko, Aquaman returned to liberate Atlantis from the Dead King and the Xebelians, using the Dead King's relic Scepter and the Trench. When the Dead King grabbed the relic Scepter and struck at Aquaman, Vulko tried to prevent the Dead King from killing him, saying that Aquaman was the rightful king of Atlantis, causing the Dead King to become so angry that he attempted to destroy all of Atlantis, but Aquaman stopped and destroyed the Dead King, along with the relic Scepter. The battle ended when Aquaman reclaimed the throne once again.

=== Atlan in other media ===
- Atlan appears as a character summon in Scribblenauts Unmasked: A DC Comics Adventure.
- Atlan appears in flashbacks depicted in the DC Extended Universe (DCEU) film Justice League and the director's cut Zack Snyder's Justice League, portrayed by Julian Lewis Jones. He commands an Atlantean army in joining forces with the Amazons, Olympian gods, Earth's then-active Green Lantern, and humanity in thwarting an Apokoliptian invasion force.
- Atlan appears in flashbacks depicted in the DCEU film Aquaman, portrayed by Graham McTavish. This version is the first king of Atlantis and ancestor of Atlanna, Arthur Curry, and Orm Marius who hid himself in the Hidden Sea to guard his trident until Curry seeks it out in the present to stop Marius.
- Atlan appears in flashbacks depicted in the DCEU film Aquaman and the Lost Kingdom, portrayed by Vincent Regan. He comes into conflict with his brother Kordax, who sought to usurp him as king, before imprisoning him with blood magic.

== Atlanna ==
Atlanna is a character appearing in American comic books published by DC Comics.

Atlanna is the mother of Aquaman in the Silver Age of Comics and the post-Crisis on Infinite Earths comics and the wife of lighthouse keeper Thomas Curry.

In post-Crisis on Infinite Earths continuity, Atlanna was retconned as the Queen of Atlantis. After a dream-affair with Atlan, Atlanna became pregnant, but died in prison from illness. Afterwards, Charybdis revives her as a mermaid.

In 2011, The New 52 rebooted the DC universe. Atlanna is the jaundiced queen of Atlantis and mother to both Arthur Curry and Orm Marius. The post-Flashpoint incarnation of Atlanna is a runaway from home after an arranged political wedding to much hated Orvax Marius of the Atlantean navy was decreed by her nation's parliament. It was during her great escape she met and fell in love with a lighthouse keeper named Thomas Curry while witnessing his bravery during a harsh storm out at sea. The two cohabited and would parent the future king of Atlantis; Aquaman. When young Arthur Curry began to manifest a rapport with the native marine life in the sea around their ocean side home early on, Atlanna was resigned to return home and face her duties as royalty under the crown.

She would marry her betrothed who now sat on the throne of the undersea nation as king, fathering a second child to him called Orm Marius, one who would later ascend to monarchy in later life. Her time as queen was rather horrid however as her spouse was abusive and power-hungry, often abusing his leadership to sanction raids on human-made vessels to spite those who made residence on land. On top of physically assaulting his lawfully wedded wife, Orvax cheated on his royal spouse, having fathered a second child named Tula with another woman at an unknown date. After finally gathering up the courage to leave her wretched life as Queen of Atlantis behind and be with her first love and other son, her king cruelly jested that he had had them killed by his military force just so she would avoid leaving him; this enraged Atlanna enough to kill him dead with her own royal scepter and make it look as though an assassin had done the deed when Orm came in on them. As Orvax's deranged rule had no shortage of enemies, this was what people believed.

During her second son's maritunis, Atlanna had faked her death during a freak accident while on stage, something which many people thought Orm secretly engineered to usurp the crown early on. She would finally leave her servitude to a nation she had hated for taking what she cherished most by using forgotten knowledge of Atlantean magitek to found her own secret nation of Pacifica, an extra-dimensional refuge for downtrodden mariners like her.

When her long-lost surface born son came looking for Atlanna, she adamantly rebuffed his claim of parentage. Believing her Arthur to be long dead, she sought to sacrifice Arthur and his wife to Karaku, a volcanic entity of colossal proportions. Aquaman managed to escape just as Atlantean reinforcements came through the Maelstrom; at the same time, Karaku the volcano god descended and attacked both sides with fire trolls. After a hard-won fight against the lava titan, Arthur would display his skill of marine telepathy which she herself possessed to prove himself. Atlanna then broke down in tears, realizing her son was alive, before sending him back to Earth with her Shell of Sounds.

=== Atlanna in other media ===
- Atlanna appears in Aquaman (2006), portrayed by Daniella Wolters.
- Atlanna makes a non-speaking appearance in the Batman: The Brave and the Bold episode "Evil Under the Sea!".
- Atlanna appears in Justice League: Throne of Atlantis, voiced by Sirena Irwin. She attempts to make peace with the surface world, but is killed by Ocean Master upon revealing she knew of his murder of several Atlanteans.
- Atlanna appears in the DC Extended Universe (DCEU), portrayed by Nicole Kidman.
  - Atlanna first appears in Aquaman (2018). This version was injured years prior while escaping from an arranged marriage and ended up in the care of lighthouse keeper Thomas Curry. They fell in love and went on to have a son named Arthur, though Atlanna was forced to return to Atlantis to protect her family. After secretly arranging for Nuidis Vulko to secretly train Arthur, she was sacrificed to the Trench for having a child outside of her marriage and presumed dead, though she fled to the Hidden Sea. In the present, Arthur and Mera encounter Atlanna while seeking out the Trident of Atlan. After joining them in escaping the Hidden Sea and thwarting Ocean Master's attempt to wage war on the surface world, Atlanna reunites with Thomas.
  - Atlanna appears in Aquaman and the Lost Kingdom.

== Atmos ==
Atmos (Marak Russen) originates from Xanthu, the same planet as Thom Kallor. Xanthuan scientists gave Russen superpowers by recreating the incident that enhanced Kallor's powers, giving him the ability to project nuclear energy and a special inhibitor field that protects him from attacks. Atmos is reintroduced following the Zero Hour: Crisis in Time! reboot, where he appears as part of the Uncanny Amazers, a superhero team from Xanthu.

Atmos was created by Paul Levitz and Greg LaRocque, and first appeared in Legion of Super-Heroes (vol. 3) #32 (March 1987).

== Atom Man ==
Atom Man (Heinrich Melch) is a Nazi super-soldier from Earth-Two who gained his powers through his father's experiments with Green Kryptonite. After a fight with Superman, Melch was transported to Earth-One, where he gained new powers and assumed the alias of Henry Miller before he was defeated by Superman and Batman. After being returned to Earth-Two, he loses his Earth-One powers and is apprehended by Earth-Two's Superman and Robin.

=== Atom Man in other media ===
- Prior to Heinrich Melch's debut in the comics, the name "Atom Man" was used in The Adventures of Superman (1945). He was a Nazi loyalist empowered with Kryptonite and sent to Metropolis as a vengeance weapon.
- An original incarnation of Atom Man, Lex Luthor, appears in Atom Man vs. Superman, portrayed by Lyle Talbot.
- Henry Miller / Atom Man appears in Superman & Lois, portrayed by Paul Lazenby. This version is a Neo-Nazi arsonist who wields a flamethrower and previously worked as a sales associate at a USA First Hardware in Lower Metropolis. During Superman's early days, Miller became Atom Man to attack minority-owned businesses and deface them with Nazi SS symbols until he was defeated by Lois Lane and Superman. As of the present, Miller acquired superpowers, but is dying of a tumor and being targeted by Intergang. Superman attempts to help him, but Peia Mannheim kills Miller and steals his body for Bruno Mannheim, who orders Intergang scientists led by Aleister Hook to incorporate it into their experiments. Hook later resurrects Miller and sends him to Smallville to attack John Henry Irons, who kills Miller once more.

== Atomica ==
Atomica (Rhonda Piñeda) is a character appearing in American comic books published by DC Comics. Created by Geoff Johns and Jesús Saíz, the character first appeared in The New 52: FCBD Special Edition #1 (June 2012) as a female Atom before Justice League vol. 2 #23 (October 2013) revealed her true identity.

She is a Hispanic American college student from Ivy Town. She is revealed to be working as a reluctant spy for Amanda Waller and is noted to be "the most important member of the Justice League of America" by Steve Trevor, gathering intel on the Justice League's recruits. At the conclusion of the "Trinity War" storyline, she is revealed to in fact be betraying both teams; she hails from the alternate universe of Earth-3, where she is a member of the Crime Syndicate operating under the name "Atomica". She also reveals that by placing a sliver of Green Kryptonite in Superman's optic nerve, she caused Superman to accidentally kill Doctor Light, with the added effect of severely weakening and almost killing Superman over time.

Atomica originally worked on Earth 3 with Jonathan Allen / Johnny Quick as a thief and killer. One night after killing two cops, they are cornered on the roof of S.T.A.R. Labs during a storm. Lightning hits a satellite which electrocuted Johnny and granting speed powers while Rhonda falls inside the building and lands near Ray Palmer's Atomico work, gaining size- and density-changing powers. During the final battle with the Crime Syndicate, Atomica reduces her size and is killed when Lex Luthor steps on her.

Following the multiverse reboot after Dark Nights: Death Metal, a new Earth 3 and Atomica are created. This version of Atomica is the lover of speedster serial killer Jonathan Chambers / Johnny Quick.

=== Atomica in other media ===
Atomica appears in Lego DC Super-Villains, voiced by Laura Bailey.

== Aurakles ==
Aurakles is a superhero appearing in American comic books published by DC Comics. He first appeared in Justice League of America #100 (August 1972), and was created by Len Wein and Dick Dillin. He was originally named Oracle, but was renamed to Aurakles in Seven Soldiers: Mister Miracle #4 (May 2006).

Aurakles was created on the planet Earth by the New Gods around 40,000 BC and is generally considered "the original superhero", by those who know his reputation. He has the mission to "bring order and meaning where incoherence reigns". Opposing the evils of his time, he battles the Sheeda and Nebula Man. The Sheeda finally succeed in imprisoning Aurakles in their "bone prisons", set up in the ancient past.

Aurakles reappears in modern times as the Oracle. When the Justice League of America and the Justice Society of America work together to bring back the time-lost Seven Soldiers of Victory (themselves victims of Nebula Man), they invoke the Oracle (in spiritual form) as their guide. It takes the combined magic of Doctor Fate (Kent Nelson), Zatanna, and Thunderbolt to summon him. Oracle refuses to give direct answers to their questions, but helps them solve the matter for themselves. He sends them to the various places in time where the Seven Soldiers have been exiled.

Some time later, Aurakles is freed by Mister Miracle (Shilo Norman) when the latter opposes Darkseid, Nebula Man, and the Sheeda as a member of the new Seven Soldiers. Aurakles' golden tomb on Mars is also seen in Grant Morrison's version of Frankenstein.

The rookie heroine Bulleteer is Aurakles' descendant and "the spear that was never thrown", one of the "Seven Imperishable Treasures" used to combat the Sheeda.

== Automan ==
Automan (Robot #32198) is a robot created by Professor Miller Sterling.

In the series New History of the DC Universe, Automan is depicted as a member of the short-lived Justice Alliance.

== Ethan Avery ==
DC introduced a new version of the character Damage as part of its "The New Age of DC Heroes" promotion in the form of US army recruit Elvis Ethan Avery He was turned into "a living weapon of mass destruction" through the Damage Project, giving him the ability to transform into a monstrous form with immense strength and durability for one hour at a time. After breaking free from his confinement following a mission against the Modoran Separatist Army, Damage rampages in Atlanta, Georgia before going into hiding.

After waking up in a homeless shelter, Ethan sees the news about Damage and goes outside to calm himself down. He is tracked down by Task Force XL, who have orders to capture him. When Ethan tries to talk them out of attacking, Parasite begins draining his life force, only to collapse after absorbing too much energy. Ethan suddenly transforms into Damage and attacks Task Force XL. After defeating Task Force XL, Damage is confronted by Wonder Woman, who advises Task Force XL to step aside and let her deal with Damage.

Wonder Woman fights Damage and uses her magic lasso on him, learning that he is actually a human. After breaking free, Damage throws Wonder Woman into a tree and escapes. Wonder Woman later informs the Justice League about her fight with Damage. Batman promises to continue to investigate the origin of Damage. The next morning, Ethan is at a coffee shop, where he sees the news about Damage. Ethan decides to leave the city.

=== Ethan Avery in other media ===
Ethan Avery appears in My Adventures with Superman, voiced by Jason Marnocha. This version is an agent of Task Force X whose abilities are derived from cybernetic Kryptonian arms.

== Aya ==
Aya is a character appearing in American comic books published by DC Comics. She was originally created for Green Lantern: The Animated Series, where she was voiced by Grey DeLisle. Aya is an artificial intelligence created by Scar as an empathetic alternative to the Manhunters before becoming sentient after Scar infused her with a fragment of Ion. However, this caused Aya to rebel against her, so Scar wiped her memories and installed her in the Interceptor spacecraft. In the present, Aya forms a physical body to assist the Interceptor's passengers Hal Jordan, Kilowog, and Razer and enters a relationship with Razer. After Razer rejects her, Aya attempts to remake the universe to eliminate the emotional spectrum before coming to her senses and sacrificing herself to stop the Manhunters.

Before her debut in the series, Aya appeared in the main comics continuity in Green Lantern (vol. 4) #65 (2011), filling a similar role but lacking a body. Aya gains a physical body in the series Green Lantern (vol. 7) #24 (2025), appearing identical to her animated counterpart.

=== Aya in other media ===
- Aya appears in the Mad segment "Does Someone Have to GOa?", voiced by Rachel Ramras.
- Aya appears in Smallville: Lantern #2.
- Aya appears in the Justice League Action episode "Barehanded", voiced again by Grey DeLisle. This version is initially Space Cabbie's GPS and assistant before leaving him to find Hal Jordan.
- Aya appears in Justice League: Crisis on Infinite Earths, voiced by Jennifer Hale.

== Aztek ==
Uno is raised from childhood by a secret organization named the Q Society to be the champion of Quetzalcoatl and battle their enemy, the deity Tezcatlipoca. He is given a magical suit of armor that bestows many abilities and augmenting his strength. After his training is completed, he enters the United States and assumes the identity of recently deceased physician Curt Falconer.

Aztek later joins the Justice League, but resigns after learning that Lex Luthor is a benefactor of the Q Society. He is blinded while battling the planet-destroying machine Mageddon, who is revealed to be Tezcatlipoca. During the World War III storyline, Aztek sacrifices himself to help Superman destroy Mageddon/Tezcatlipoca.

A new version of the character, Nayeli Constant, debuted in Justice League of America vol. 5 #20. She is a software engineer in Austin, Texas who is recruited by Aztek's helmet to succeed Uno following his death. Constant modifies the helmet and armor to suit her needs. After traveling to the city of Vanity, Constant comes into conflict with the Ray, as they both seek to protect Vanity. The two later decide to work together.

=== Aztek in other media ===
- Aztek appears in Justice League Unlimited, voiced by Chris Cox in "Question Authority" and Corey Burton in "I Am Legion". This version is a member of the Justice League.
- Aztek appears as a character summon in Scribblenauts Unmasked: A DC Comics Adventure.
