= Who's Who in the DC Universe =

Comic book character catalogue series

Front cover of Who's Who: The Definitive Directory of the DC Universe Volume I (March 1985). Art by George Pérez.

Who's Who: The Definitive Directory of the DC Universe (1985–87), usually referred to simply as Who's Who, is the umbrella title for a number of comic book series which DC Comics published to catalogue information about their characters.

== History ==
Who's Who was the creation of Len Wein, Marv Wolfman, and Robert Greenberger, and its first incarnation (Who's Who: The Definitive Directory of the DC Universe) debuted in the last month of 1984 (cover dated March 1985) and ran for 26 issues until 1987 (cover-dated April 1987). It was essentially an encyclopedia in comic book form, listing the characters, places, and technology in the DC Universe, with a loose leaf format devised by editor Michael Eury. It began one month before the 12-issue limited series Crisis on Infinite Earths began; therefore, the earlier issues discuss pre-Crisis versions of the characters, whereas issues released after the conclusion of the limited series discuss the post-Crisis versions. For example, while both the Flash and Supergirl died during the Crisis, the Flash's death is not mentioned as issue #8 predates his death, but Supergirl's death is recounted 14 months later in issue #22. Also, characters such as Superman and Wonder Woman were rebooted during the series' run, so their entries recounted their post-Crisis histories only, while their entire Silver Age histories (and all the unique elements of those characters during that time, such as Superman's Fortress of Solitude and Wonder Woman's powerless period) were ignored.

Who's Who was DC's answer to The Official Handbook of the Marvel Universe, which was published a few years earlier. Each character had an individualized logo instead of a standard typeface; figures were shown in action poses rather than full-body portraits drawn by individual artists; character histories and power descriptions were more vague; and characters from all of DC's various lines and imprints were included (such as out-of-continuity series like Camelot 3000 and Watchmen), not just those from its shared universe (although Who's Who Update '88 did limit its entries to in-continuity series only).

Various updated versions of the Who's Who have appeared over the years, including Who's Who Update '87 (five issues, cover dated August to December 1987) and Who's Who Update '88 (four issues, cover dated August to November 1988). Both books featured new entries, revised entries for characters in previous volumes, and an Appendix which included minor updates and corrections for previous entries. In 1989, most of the DC Annuals released that year included Who's Who entries. (Note: The following Annuals released in 1989 did not have Who's Who entries: Doc Savage Annual #1, Hellblazer Annual #1, and The Shadow Strikes! Annual #1.) Many of these were revised versions of entries in the regular Who's Who series, but there were several new entries (particularly for supporting characters).

DC Comics also published two Who's Who spin-off series in the 1980s. The first was Who's Who in Star Trek, a two-issue series (cover-dated March and April 1987) which profiled characters and locations from the Star Trek franchise. As the series was released prior to the premiere of Star Trek: The Next Generation, no information from that series was included.

The second spin-off was Who's Who in the Legion of Super-Heroes, a seven-issue series (cover-dated April to November 1988) which expanded on the Legion information included in the regular Who's Who and featured profiles on the various supporting characters, organizations, locations and villains which have appeared in Legion stories over the years. Some of the information contained in this book was post-Crisis instead of pre-Crisis. For example, the Superboy profile relates the post-Crisis origin of the character as a creation of the Time Trapper, and there is no profile for Supergirl, despite her many adventures with the Legion, since by this time she was written out of continuity.

In 1990, DC started over with a new Who's Who series titled Who's Who in the DC Universe (16 loose-leaf issues with binders sold separately, cover-dated August 1990 to February 1992). This book was not as comprehensive as the previous Who's Who (for example, there was no entry for the Atom, even though his character was undergoing major changes in the comic Suicide Squad), and some of the entries took on a less serious tone. One instance is an entry for Guy Gardner, which is written from the character's perspective. Another instance is a blank entry for Death, which has all the usual information headings crossed out and a blue marker scrawl stating simply "Someday you'll meet her. You can find out for yourself".

This series was followed up by Who's Who in the DC Universe Update 1993 (two loose-leaf issues, cover-dated December 1992 and January 1993). DC also released a Who's Who series for their Impact Comics line (three loose-leaf issues, cover-dated September 1991 to May 1992).

During the period from the late 1990s through the end of the 2000s, Who's Who was replaced with Secret Files and Origins, a series of one-shots devoted to particular characters or events in the DC Universe and which feature Who's Who-like profiles. DK Publishing released a number of Ultimate Guides as well as a book titled The DC Comics Encyclopedia, which serve a similar purpose.

In December 2009, DC announced a new Who's Who series to be published in 2010 as part of the company's 75th anniversary celebration. The series was later announced for 18 issues, 48 pages per issue, beginning in May 2010 with Robert Greenberger as sole writer and Bob Harras as editor. The series launch was subsequently delayed, but in October DC vice-president Dan DiDio stated that the series would be released after the 2011 DCU line-wide event, Flashpoint. Flashpoint and The New 52 rebooted the DC Universe, making a new edition of Who's Who unlikely in the short term because the histories of many characters were in a state of flux.

In 2022, The New Golden Age one-shot included 12 new Who's Who-style entries for Aquaman, Betsy Ross and Molly Pitcher, Cherry Bomb, Harlequin's Son, John Henry Jr., Ladybug, Legionnaire, Mister Miracle, Quiz Kid, Red Lantern, Salem the Witch Girl, and Boom.

In 2023, the DC Power: A Celebration one-shot included 10 new Who's Who-style entries: Amazing-Man, Aquaman (Jackson Hyde), Batman (Jace Fox), Batwing, Nubia, Green Lantern (Jo Mullein), Green Lantern (John Stewart), Kid Flash (Ace West), Thunder/Lightning, and Vixen.

The DC Power 2024 one-shot included five new Who's Who-style entries: Black Manta, Mister Terrific (Michael Holt), The Signal, The Spectre (Crispus Allen), and Val-Zod.

== Bibliography of Who's Who series ==
=== Who's Who: The Definitive Directory of the DC Universe ===
Volume	Info	Cover date
I	Abel to Auron	March 1985
II	Automan to Blackhawk Plane/Island	April 1985
III	Black Lightning to Byth Rok	May 1985
IV	Cadre to Chris KL-99	June 1985
V	Chronos to Cyclotron	July 1985
VI	Daily Planet to Doctor Polaris	August 1985
VII	Doctor Psycho to Fastback	September 1985
VIII	Fatal Five to Garguax	October 1985
IX	Garn Daanuth to Guardians of the Universe	November 1985
X	Gunner and Sarge to Hyena	December 1985
XI	Icicle to Jonni Thunder	January 1986
XII	Jonny Double to Kong the Untamed	February 1986
XIII	Krona to Losers	March 1986
XIV	Luthor I to Masters of Disaster	April 1986
XV	Matrix-Prime to Mister Tawky Tawny	May 1986
XVI	Mr. Terrific to Nightmaster	June 1986
XVII	Nightshade to Persuader	July 1986
XVIII	Phantom Girl to Pursuer	August 1986
XIX	Puzzler to Roy Raymond	September 1986
XX	Rubberduck to Shining Knight	October 1986
XXI	Shrinking Violet to Starfinger	November 1986
XXII	Starfire to Syonide	December 1986
XXIII	Syrene to Time Trapper	January 1987
XXIV	Tim Trench to Universo	February 1987
XXV	Unknown Soldier to Witch Boy	March 1987
XXVI	Wizard to Zyklon, plus Angel and the Ape to The 1,000	April 1987

=== Who's Who Update '87 ===
Volume	Info	Cover date
1	All-Star Squadron to Catalyst	August 1987
2	Catwoman to Goldstar	September 1987
3	Gray Man to Lion-Mane	October 1987
4	Lois Lane to Rampage	November 1987
5	Reaper to Zymyr, plus Appendix	December 1987

=== Who's Who Update '88 ===
Volume	Info	Cover date
1	Amazing-Man to Harlequin	August 1988
2	Icemaiden to Nightwing	September 1988
3	Parliament of Trees to Trident	October 1988
4	Ultra-Humanite to Zuggernaut, plus Abby Cable to General Wade Eiling and Appendix	November 1988

=== Who's Who 1989 Annuals ===
Issue	Info	Cover date
Action Comics Annual #2	Entries for Cat Grant and Matrix	June 1989
Batman Annual #13	Entries for Alfred Pennyworth, Barbara Gordon, Batman, Commissioner Gordon, Robin (Dick Grayson), Robin (Jason Todd) and Vicki Vale	June 1989
Blackhawk Annual #1	Entries for Andre Blanc-Dumont, Blackhawk, Blackhawk Express, Carlo "Chuck" Sirianni, Grover Baines, Keng Quan Chee a.k.a. "Mairzey", Lady Blackhawk (Natalie Reed), Olaf Friedriksen and Weng Chan	May 1989
Detective Comics Annual #2	Entries for Catwoman, Clayface, Joker, Penguin, Poison Ivy, Ra's al Ghul, Riddler, Scarecrow and Two-Face	September 1989
Dr. Fate Annual #1	Entry for Dr. Fate	September 1989
Flash Annual #3	Entries for Chunk, Flash (Jay Garrick), Flash (Barry Allen), Flash (Wally West), Jerry and Tina McGee, Joan Garrick, Kapitalist Kouriers, Mary West, and Mason Trollbridge	June 1989
Green Arrow Annual #2	Entries for Black Canary, Green Arrow, James Cameron, Shado and Speedy	July 1989
Justice League International Annual #3	Entries for JLI Embassy staff members (Anatole "Bob" Blazac, Boris Dmitravich Razumihin, Catherine Colbert, Cyndy Kurahara, Ernesto Lopez, Esteban Sanchez, Inada Akatsu, Joshua Barbazon, Michael and Lisa Morice, Rodan "Duke" Katatami, Rosa and Dana Rubikskova and Tasmanian Devil)	July 1989
New Titans Annual #5	Entries for the Titan Seeds, the Titans of Myth and Troia	August 1989
Question Annual #2	Entries for Aristotle Rodor, Isadore O'Toole, Lady Shiva, Myra Fermin, and the Question	July 1989
Secret Origins Annual #3	Entries for Antithesis, Bumblebee, Flamebird, Gargoyle, Golden Eagle, and Herald	May 1989
Swamp Thing Annual #5	Entry for the Swamp Thing	August 1989
Wonder Woman Annual #2	Entry for the Mayer Agency	September 1989

=== Who's Who in Star Trek ===
Issue	Info	Cover date
1	Entries from Andorians to Leonard McCoy plus Appendix entries for Balok, Lt. Boma, Charlie Evans, Zefram Cochrane, the planet Cheron, John Gill, Landru, Angela Martine, Marlena Moreau, Admiral Harry Morrow, Nomad, Omicron Ceti III, Lt. Carolyn Palamas, Andrew Stiles, Captain Stiles, the Tholians, Trelane, Zarabeth, and Zetar	March 1987
2	Entries from Marla McGivers to the Vulcans plus Appendix display of command symbols and the environmental jacket	April 1987

=== Who's Who in the Legion of Super-Heroes ===
Issue	Info	Cover date
1	History of the Legion (part one), plus entries for Absorbency Boy to Dr. Gym'll	April 1988
2	History of the Legion (part two), plus entries for Dr. Mayavale to High Seer of Naltor	June 1988
3	Planets of the 30th Century, plus entries for Heroes of Lallor to Legion of Super-Rejects	July 1988
4	Homeworlds of the Legion, plus entries for Legion of Super-Villains to Mon-El	August 1988
5	Tour of Legion Headquarters, plus entries for Mordru to Science Police	September 1988
6	The Wonders of Metropolis, plus entries for Sden to Timber Wolf	October 1988
7	The Nik Feelds Show, plus entries for Time Trapper to Zoraz	November 1988

=== Who's Who in the DC Universe ===
Issue	Info	Cover date
1	Entries for Amanda Waller, Amethyst, Atlantis, Blue Beetle's Bug, Brotherhood of Dada, Cain and Abel, Challengers of the Unknown, Cosmic Boy, Darkseid, Dominators, El Diablo, Fire, Geo-Force, Hawk, Jericho, Jonathan and Martha Kent, Kono, Ocean Master, Orion, Scarecrow, Sinestro, Stanley and His Monster, Superman, Time Masters, and Wotan	August 1990
2	Entries for Booster Gold, Captain Boomerang, Changeling, Deadline, Despero, Doctor Polaris, Flamebird, Flash, Hawkworld, I…Vampire, Katana, King Faraday, Laurel Gand, Maxima, Maxwell Lord, Metamorpho, Metron, Mordru, Mother Box, Mudpack, Naiad, Newsboy Legion, Secret Six and Starman	September 1990
3	Entries for Alfred Pennyworth, Apokolips, Black Racer, Brainiac, Brainiac 5, Chunk, Count Vertigo, Deadman, Deadshot, Gorilla Grodd, Green Lantern, Ice, Jade, Kadaver, Kestrel, Madame Xanadu, Manga Khan, New Guardians, Rebis, Reep Daggle, Silver Swan, Sinbad, Speedy and Spider Girl	October 1990
4	Entries for Barter, Blaze, Blue Beetle, Cheetah, Chronos, DeSaad, Fastbak, Granny Goodness, Human Target, KGBeast/NKVDemon, Khunds, Lightning Lord, Lightray, Persuader, Phantom Lady, Plastic Man, Rocket Red, S.T.A.R. Labs, Troia, Ultra the Multi-Alien, Vandal Savage, Vril Dox II, Weather Wizard and Wonder Woman	November 1990
5	Entries for Batmobile, Chemo, Cyborg, Daxamites, Doctor Light, Extremists, Hourman, Jimmy Olsen, Jo Nah, Lyrissa Mallor, Mad Hatter, Martian Manhunter, Nightshade, Peacemaker, Penguin, Poison Ivy, Riddler, Sandman, Solomon Grundy, Sonar, Son of Vulcan, Toyman, Trickster and Vigilante	December 1990
6	Entries for Adam Strange, Ayla Ranzz, Bolt, Captain Atom, Conglomerate, Copperhead, Crazy Jane, Dolphin, Dove, Floro, Fortress of Solitude, Gangbuster, Glorious Godfrey and Amazing Grace, Hawkman, Huntress, Kanjar Ro, Mister Bones, Mister Nebula and Scarlet Skier, Northwind, Power Girl, Royal Flush Gang, Sarge Steel, Snapper Carr, Vi, and Wildcat	January 1991
7	Entries for Aqualad, Barbara Gordon, Blockbuster, Brother Power the Geek, Checkmate, The Chief, The Creeper, Darkseid's Elite, the Demon, Elongated Man, Felix Faust, Global Guardians, Jan Arrah, Justice League America, Killer Croc, Major Force, New Genesis, Oberon, Parasite, Perry White, Phase, Shade the Changing Man, Tweedledee and Tweedledum, and Wonder Woman's supporting cast (Ed Indelicato, Etta Candy, Julia Kapatelis, Steve Trevor, and Vanessa Kapatelis)	February 1991
8	Entries for Ares, Black Thorn, Brain and Monsieur Mallah, Butcher, Byth Rok, Captain Comet, Death, Durlans, Flaw and Child, Furball, Green Lantern John Stewart, Hero Hotline, Kent Shakespeare, Lobo, Nuklon, Phantom Stranger, Punch and Jewelee, Raven, Society of Sin, Spectre, Strata, Turtle, Ventriloquist and Yuga Khan	April 1991
9	Entries for Black Canary, Blue Devil, Bronze Tiger, Chuck Taine, Dev-Em, Dirk Morgna, Dr. Fate, Firehawk, Gim Allon, Glorith, Hugo Strange, Kalibak, Kilowog, the Legion of Super-Heroes, Luornu Durgo, Mysa Nal, Rhea Jones, Roxxas, Shadow Thief, Tenzil Kem, Terminator, Universo, Vicki Vale and Vixen	May 1991
10	Entries for Angel and the Ape, Dial "H" For Hero, Dorothy Spinner, Draaga/Death-Rite, Element Girl, Firestorm, Flash, Flash supporting cast (Connie Noleski, Joan Garrick, Linda Park, Mary West, Mason Trollbridge, The McGees), Garryn Bek, Hippolyte, Joe Potato, Jonni Thunder, Kilg%re, Lady Shiva, Lords of Order and Chaos, Nimbus, Patchwork Man, Robin, Shark, Starfire, Thorn, Velvet Tiger, Waverider and Wild Dog	June 1991
11	Entries for Big Barda, Boom Tubes, Crimson Fox, Doctor Light, Doctor Spectro, General Glory, Guardians of the Universe, Guy Gardner, Hell's Hierarchy, Joshua Clay, L.E.G.I.O.N., the Legion of Substitute Heroes, Legion supporting cast (Calorie Queen, Circe, King Jonn, Loomis, Marte Allon, Rond Vidar, Shvaughn Erin), LexCorp, the Madmen, Mister Miracle (Scott Free), Mister Miracle (Shilo Norman), Prankster, Rainbow Raider, Red Star, Sudden Death, Terra-Man, Two-Face, and the Wanderers	July 1991
12	Entries for Aquaman, Bibbo Bibbowski, Blasters, Blue Jay and Silver Sorceress, Cheshire, Elasti-Girl, G'nort, Hawkwoman, Highfather, Intergang, Klarion the Witch Boy, Lois Lane, Man-Bat, Mera, Metal Men, Mr. Freeze, Project Cadmus, Question, Red Tornado, Silver Banshee, Stealth, Suicide Squad, Tasmanian Devil, and Zatanna	September 1991
13	Entries for Arkham Asylum, the Batcave, Blackfire, Captain Cold, Catman, the Dark Circle, Doctor Psycho, Eclipso, Eradicator, Female Furies, Heat Wave, Joker, King Snake, Kobra, Lex Luthor, Metallo, Mirror Master, Mister Mxyzptlk, Psi-Phon and Dreadnaught, Psycho-Pirate, Ra's al Ghul, Reverse-Flash, Shrapnel, Starro, and Star Sapphire	October 1991
14	Entries for Anarky, Animal Man, Catherine Cobert, Doctor Alchemy, Green Arrow, Injustice League, Invasion!, Lady Quark, Lana Lang and Pete Ross, Lord Chaos, Maxie Zeus, Millennium, New Titans, Nightwing, Obsidian, Pantha, Ragman, Garth and Imra Ranzz, Rex the Wonder Dog, Tamaran, Teen Titans, Untouchables, Valor, and Wildebeest	November 1991
15	Entries for Abby Arcane, American Scream, Anton Arcane, Black Orchid, Cliff Steele, Danny the Street, Doom Patrol, the Doom Patrol's rogues gallery (Beard Hunter, Red Jack, The Scissormen, and The Shadowy Mr. Evans), The Dreaming, The Endless, Flex Mentallo, John Constantine, Kathy George, Kid Eternity, Les Perdu, Matthew the Raven, Men From N.O.W.H.E.R.E., Mister E, Parliament of Trees, Swamp Thing, Tefé Holland, Temptress, Three Witches and Tim Hunter	January 1992
16	Entries for Ambush Bug, Batman, Black Lightning, Catwoman, Circe, Commissioner Gordon, Cosmic Odyssey, Etrigan's supporting cast (Glenda Mark, Harry Matthews, Randu Singh), DeSaad, Devlin O'Ryan, Forever People, Infinity, Inc., Krypton, Laurel Gand, Legion of Super-Heroes: The Beginning, Major Victory, Matrix (Supergirl), Maxwell Lord, Monarch, New Challengers of the Unknown, New Gods, Phantasm, Pied Piper, Prince Evillo, Rampage, Talia al Ghul, Uncle Sam and Zamarons	February 1992

=== Who's Who in the DC Universe Update 1993 ===
Issue	Info	Cover date
1	Entries for Abra Kadabra, Agent Liberty, Azrael, Black Condor, Black Mask, Cerberus, Count Viper, Eclipso, Evil Star, Green Lantern Corps, The Heckler, Ice Man, Ig'nea, Jack Marshall, Hacker, Lady Jane, Legionnaires, Lord Satanus, Mister Z, The Netherworld, Starbreaker, Timber Wolf, Valor, White Dragon, and Yankee Doodle Dandy	December 1992
2	Entries for Arion, Atomic Skull, Battalion, Bloodwynd, Candlemaker, Congorilla, The Darkstars, Doomsday, Guy Gardner, Jakob Whorrsman, Justice League America Headquarters, Justice Society of America, L.E.G.I.O.N. R.E.C.R.U.I.T.S., Lex Luthor, Linear Men, The Lurker, New Earth, Oa, Ramona, The Ray, Team Titans, Thrust, Thunderbolt's supporting cast (Anne-Marie Brigette Brogan, Cairo De Frey, Detective Inspector James Sidney Flint, Tabu Jaswinder Singh), Vigilante, and Willoughby Kipling	January 1993

=== Impact Comics Who's Who ===
Issue	Info	Cover date
1	Entries for Applejack, Arachnus, A.R.M.S. Installation, Len "Big Daddy" Rothco/Frances "Gunny" Beaupre, Richard "Brew" Troy/Jesus "Jump" Kennedy, Chromium, Timon de Guzman, The Fly, Wild Bill Grady, Lt. Devon Hall, Arvell Hauser, Inferno, Victoria Johnson, Ben Lee/Lance Perry, Mary Masterson-Higgins/Masterson Concepts, Maxx-13, The Moonlighter, Lt. Walker Odell, Professor Maxim Ruiz, The Shield, The Sunshine Kid/Ishmael "St. James" Himes, Templar, Luiza Timmerman, and The Web	September 1991
2	Entries for The Black Hood, The Black Witch, Bobby "Brick" Boone/Jennifer Novak/Eldon Sinclair, Theo Carver, The Comet, The Connors' lab, Dan Connors/Henry and Betsy Connors/Karen Davis, Tracy Dickerson, Dolphus, Victor Drago, General Mechanix, General Higgins, Saleh "Silver" Himes/Karen "Buster" Thomas, The Jaguar, Powell Jennings, Dusty Madigan, Meridian, The Problem, Donald "Rowdy" Spates/Radcliffe "Rad" Stiles, Jason Troy Sr., Albert E. Watson/Millie Mazda, The Weapon, Kevin Wells/Crawford "Win" Winfield, and The Wolf	October 1991
3	Entries for The American Crusaders, Black Hood "Hit" Coffee, Black Hood Nate Cray, Bob Phantom, Burnout, Captain Commando, Creeptures, Crusaders, Domino, Fireball, Fox, Hangman, Indigo, Kalathar, Mann-X, The Original Shield, Ozone, Pirate Blue, Shield, Studs, Tech Wizards, Tom Sickler, Tremor, and Void	May 1992

== Collected editions ==
- Who's Who Omnibus
  - Volume 1 collects Who's Who: The Definitive Directory of the DC Universe Volumes I-XXVI, Who's Who Update 1987 #1-5, Who's Who Update 1988 #1-4, and the Who's Who profiles from Action Comics Annual #2, Batman Annual #13, Blackhawk Annual #1, Detective Comics Annual #2, Doctor Fate Annual #1, Green Arrow Annual #2, Justice League Annual #3, Secret Origins Annual #3, Swamp Thing Annual #5, The Flash Annual #3, The New Titans Annual #5, The Question Annual #2, and Wonder Woman Annual #2; 1,320 pages, April 2021, 978-1779505996.
  - Volume 2 collects Who's Who in the DC Universe #1-16, Who's Who in the Legion of Super-Heroes #1-7, Who's Who Update 1993 #1-2; 1,216 pages, December 2022, 978-1779515193.

== See also ==
- Official Handbook of the Marvel Universe
