= Garryn Bek =

- Garryn Bek as depicted in L.E.G.I.O.N. '90 #15 (May 1990). Art by Kevin Maguire.

Publication information
- Publisher: DC Comics
- First appearance: Invasion! #1 (Jan. 1989)
- Created by: Keith Giffen (writer); Bill Mantlo (writer); Todd McFarlane (artist)

In-story information
- Species: Cairn
- Place of origin: Cairn
- Team affiliations: L.E.G.I.O.N. R.E.B.E.L.S.
- Abilities: Strategic management and military administration

Garryn Bek is a fictional extraterrestrial superhero character published by DC Comics. Created by Keith Giffen, Bill Mantlo, and Todd McFarlane, the character first appeared in Invasion! #1 (January 1989), and went on to become a founding member of L.E.G.I.O.N.

== Publication history ==
As a member of the titular group, Garryn appeared in L.E.G.I.O.N. '89 (February 1989) through L.E.G.I.O.N. '94 (September 1994) by Keith Giffen, Alan Grant, and Kevin Maguire returning several issues later in the follow-up series R.E.B.E.L.S. '94 (October 1994) through R.E.B.E.L.S. '96 (March 1996) by Tom Peyer and Arnie Jorgensen. Bek makes two minor unnamed appearances in Infinite Crisis #1 (December 2005) and Rann-Thanagar War: Infinite Crisis Special #1 (April 2006).

== Fictional character biography ==
For years, Garryn Bek served on the planet Cairn's police force. Imprisoned on the Citadel-run Starlag prison asteroid during the Dominator-led Alien Alliance's invasion of Earth, Garryn shares a cell with Adam Strange, who mysteriously disappears, and next with Vril Dox. When Dox masterminds an escape plan, Bek and other inmates, including future L.E.G.I.O.N. teammates, participate in a riot and successfully escape the prison.

Traveling aboard a commandeered ship, the first stop for Bek and other former inmates is Colu, Dox's homeworld. Through the manipulations of Dox, the group assists in his liberation of Colu from the control of the ruling computer tyrants. On the heels of this victory, Dox unilaterally decides to take the troupe to Bek's homeworld, Cairn, which is ruled by drug lords. It is here, after empowering the police force of Zalman City, installing himself as commissioner and overthrowing the world's drug lords, that Dox's growing organization is dubbed Licensed Extra-Governmental Interstellar Operatives Network (L.E.G.I.O.N.), enlisting the former inmates and Coluan forces as members.

While orbiting the planet Rista, Bek encounters the Emerald Eye of Ekron, a sentient mystical object of near unlimited power. The Eye chooses Bek as its new "beholder", and it quickly becomes unclear which of the two is in control. Under the influence, Bek kills two innocent L.E.G.I.O.N. employees. The Eye soon chooses Bek's estranged wife Marij'n as a "co-beholder", but shortly abandons them both in reverse succession.

When Dox's son Lyrl Dox usurps control of L.E.G.I.O.N., Bek joins Dox's newly formed opposition group R.E.B.E.L.S. After Lyrl is defeated, Bek and his comrades once again assume control of L.E.G.I.O.N., where he becomes an administrator.

== Powers and abilities ==
On his own, Garryn Bek has no extra-human abilities and shows lackluster combat skills. He is an exemplary administrator and pilot.

Through his connection with the Emerald Eye of Ekron, Bek had access to near limitless power. Responding to (and also affecting) Bek's will, the Eye exhibited abilities to produce force fields, emit energy blasts, and manipulate the mind.

== Alternate versions ==
Bek organizes a resistance cell to Dox's tyranny in the Armageddon 2001 crossover. He recruits a band of former L.E.G.I.O.N. members, but it ends badly.

== In other media ==
Garryn Bek appears in DC Super Hero Girls: Intergalactic Games, voiced by John DiMaggio.
