= Captain Comet =

- Comet as depicted in Mystery in Space #1 (November 2006). Art by Shane Davis.

Publication information
- Publisher: DC Comics
- First appearance: Strange Adventures #9 (June 1951)
- Created by: Julius Schwartz; John Broome; Carmine Infantino

In-story information
- Alter ego: Adam Blake
- Species: Metahuman
- Place of origin: Earth
- Team affiliations: L.E.G.I.O.N. Secret Society of Super Villains; R.E.B.E.L.S. Justice League
- Notable aliases: Comet
- Abilities: Superhuman strength and invulnerability Immense telekinetic and telepathic powers Flight; Super speed Tremendous intellect Photographic memory Concussive energy shot Aura vision Teleportation; Clairvoyance; Postcognition; Extended lifespan Accelerated healing Invisibility

Captain Comet (Adam Blake) is a superhero appearing in American comic books published by DC Comics, created by editor Julius Schwartz, writer John Broome, and artist Carmine Infantino.

Once a minor character in the DC Comics canon, he occupies a unique position in DC Comics history as being created between the Golden Age and Silver Age. His early stories fall into a no-man's land, sometimes referred to as "The Atomic Age" because of the recurrent science-fiction themes of most comics of the period, when very few superheroes comics were published and fewer than 12 short-lived superhero characters were introduced.

Adam Blake appeared in live-action The CW's TV series Naomi, portrayed by Chase Anderson.

== Publication history ==
The character of Captain Comet first appeared in a 10-page tale, "The Origin of Captain Comet", in the flagship science-fiction title Strange Adventures #9 (June 1951) published by National Comics (now known as DC Comics). He was created by Strange Adventures editor Julius Schwartz, John Broome, and artist Carmine Infantino, and the story was written by John Broome (under the alias Edgar Ray Merritt), drawn by Carmine Infantino, and inked by Bernard Sachs. The character was based on the pulp fiction character Captain Future.

His first appearance was actually a two-part story, continued in "The Air Bandits from Space" in Strange Adventures #10 (July 1951). From issue #12 (September 1951) Murphy Anderson took over as artist, and he drew all Captain Comet's further appearances in Strange Adventures until #46 (July 1954); Sy Barry and Gil Kane drew the last two stories. John Broome wrote every issue.

Captain Comet appeared in 38 issues of Strange Adventures (missing only issues #45, 47, and 48) and ending in Strange Adventures #49 (October 1954). From the beginning, Captain Comet appeared on most of the covers, mainly drawn by Murphy Anderson or Gil Kane. Stories ranged in length from six to 10 pages, dropping from 10 pages in 1951 to eight pages in 1952 and finally six pages from May 1953. He next appeared in 1976, when writer Gerry Conway and co-writer David Anthony Kraft reintroduced him as a supporting character in Secret Society of Super Villains, starting with "No Man Shall Call Me Master" (Secret Society of Super Villains #2 (July/August 1976)). He appeared in most issues of that title, together with the associated Secret Society of Super Villains Special #1 (October 1977), until it was cancelled with issue #15 (June/July 1978). During this run, he also appeared in Super-Team Family Giant #13 (September 1977), a story directly linked to the Secret Society of Super Villains series, and as lead character for the first time since 1954 in an extended story, "Danger: Dinosaurs at Large!" in DC Special #27, April/May 1977, by Bob Rozakis and artist Rich Buckler. Secret Society of Super Villains was cancelled as part of the DC Implosion. Captain Comet was a popular character at the time—he came second in a poll for potential Justice League membership, and writer Bob Rozakis presented DC Comics with a proposal for Captain Comet's first self-titled series.

After the cancellation of Secret Society of Super Villains, Captain Comet entered another hiatus, his appearances limited to guest spots in other DC titles during the 1980s. Four of these were cameo appearances—Crisis on Infinite Earths #5 (August 1985), #10 (January 1986) and #12 (March 1986), and All-Star Squadron #53 (January 1986). Two were team-ups with Superman—DC Comics Presents #22 (June 1980) and 91 (March 1986); the fourth was a retelling of his origin by Roy Thomas in Secret Origins vol. 2 Annual #1 (1987). He also appeared in the non-canonical series DC Challenge (1986).

He then became a supporting character in the L.E.G.I.O.N. series from issue #16 (June 1990). Captain Comet was a late replacement for fellow 1950s space traveler Adam Strange, who was planned as a regular character until potential continuity problems with the contemporary Adam Strange limited series became a concern. He was then part of the R.E.B.E.L.S. series which continued from L.E.G.I.O.N. That series was cancelled with R.E.B.E.L.S. '96 #17 (March 1996), and he had a solo story in Showcase '96 #10 (November 1996), after which another hiatus followed.

In 2005, under the writer Jim Starlin, Captain Comet had his highest profile in DC Comics publications since the 1950s, featuring in the Rann–Thanagar War miniseries (2005), starring in the eight-issue miniseries Mystery in Space vol. 2 (2006), and co-starring in Rann-Thanagar Holy War (2008) and Strange Adventures vol. 3 (2009), as well as appearing briefly in the 52 (2006) and Final Crisis (2008) events. Following that, he became a regular character in the ongoing R.E.B.E.L.S. series (2009).

In 2011, a revamped version of Captain Comet, renamed simply "Comet", featured in Grant Morrison's run on Action Comics.

== Fictional character biography ==
Strange Adventures #9, art by Carmine Infantino.

=== 1950s – Strange Adventures ===
Captain Comet, the "first man of the future", is a metahuman "born a hundred thousand years before his time", in 1931 to John and Martha Blake, a farming couple from the American Midwest. His "metagene" was triggered by a comet passing overhead at birth.

Adam discovers his abilities while growing up. After leaving school, he becomes a librarian in Midwest City and learns of his mutant nature from physicist Emery Zackro. Zackro proposes that Adam is the reverse of an evolutionary throwback, "an accidental specimen of future man". (Note: Roy Thomas' telling of Captain Comet's origin in Secret Origins vol. 2 Annual #1 (1987) has this happening in his senior year, not after leaving school.) After Adam prevents criminals from stealing Zackro's device, Zackro convinces him to become a superhero. His first public appearance as Captain Comet has him battle terraforming alien robots. During this time, Adam builds a spaceship based on Zackro's design named The Cometeer. (Note: Although it is Roy Thomas' re-telling of Captain Comet's history in Secret Origins vol. 2 Annual #1 (1987) that actually makes this clear.)

Over the next three years, Comet saves Earth from multiple alien invasions and explores space in The Cometeer, saving other civilizations and meeting alien damsels. During this period, he largely uses intelligence and his mind-reading skills to help solve problems, seldom resorting to physical solutions. Among his weirder adventures, Captain Comet battled alien Greek gods, dinosaurs, and an evil super-powered ape. In 1954, Comet disappears during a space expedition.

=== 1970s–1980s ===
In 1976 Captain Comet returned to Earth, having not aged, with a new protective costume instead of a spacesuit, and enhanced skills—controlling his appearance mentally (although dressing in 1950s style)—and with a powerful physical punch as well as a mental force, super-speed, and an ability to manipulate objects. He also had an explanation for his absence—having always felt alienated from normal humans because of his abilities, he has been over 20 years in space. After misreading a battle between Green Lantern and Gorilla Grodd, and some trickery by Grodd, he ended up joining the Secret Society of Super Villains and battled Darkseid and the forces of Apokolips with them. Later he turned down full membership in the Justice League, but became an honorary member and took up residence in their satellite headquarters. After fighting Chronos and dinosaurs in Gotham City, the Captain continued his crusade against the Secret Society of Super Villains despite a number of setbacks orchestrated by Gorilla Grodd.

Although present at the marriage of Ray Palmer and Jean Loring several months later, Captain Comet remained off-radar for nearly two years, eventually contacting Superman when the effect of the comet that mutated him wore off, turning him into a human comet whose powers fluctuated wildly. With Superman's help he tracked down the comet and stabilized his powers. Superman's help was needed again six years later when the villain Brain Storm attempted to augment his waning powers by stealing Captain Comet's power, which accidentally evolved him to a more advanced form temporarily.

=== 1990s – L.E.G.I.O.N. / R.E.B.E.L.S. ===
He spent the next few years roaming space, before being captured by the space outlaw Dagon-Ra despite his new powers including near invulnerability, telekinesis and increased strength. Rescued by L.E.G.I.O.N., he recuperated in their headquarters hospital and was invited to join them soon after, and did so a year later.

His involvement with L.E.G.I.O.N. was in a supporting role. He fell in love with fellow member scientist Marij'n Bek, who nursed him back to health and studied the massive headaches he frequently suffered. These were the result of his possession by a psi-creature in space before meeting L.E.G.I.O.N.; it was eventually purged by Vril Dox, leaving the Captain once again hospitalised for months. Soon after he was apparently killed by Lady Quark—who had been possessed by the same parasite. Buried under a mountain on Ith'kaa, he eventually dug himself out and used his knowledge to manipulate the savage indigenous population to achieve the technological level to build him a spaceship (explaining later, without irony, that it took six months to industrialize the tribal society because "they were slow learners"). Returning to R.E.B.E.L.S. homeworld of Cairn, he learned that Vril Dox's son Lyrl had brainwashed most of the L.E.G.I.O.N., made the key L.E.G.I.O.N. members fugitives, and taken control of Cairn; he and Maryj'n formed a resistance movement to free the population and overthrow Lyrl, and were key in successfully defeating him. As a result, Captain Comet became leader of the new, reformed L.E.G.I.O.N.

During this period, Captain Comet took up residence (with Tyrone, an artificially created telepathic clone bulldog) in The Zelazny Building on "Hardcore Station", a corrupt commercial satellite station with a population of several million in a free space zone between a number of trading civilisations.

=== Post 1990s ===
==== Rann–Thanagar War ====
At some undefined point in the next 10 years, Captain Comet stepped down as leader and became a paid freelance aide and agent to Vril Dox, who took back the L.E.G.I.O.N. reins. He was next seen with Dox under contract to the planet Ancar, which had been invaded by Khunds during the Rann–Thanagar War; after intervention by Green Lantern Kyle Rayner, he decided to stay and help him end the war. He first accompanied Kyle to the destroyed planet Thanagar, where they built a protective dome and terraformed the land to create a secure environment for the survivors. Then he joined up with Adam Strange and Hawkman to defend Rann against the Thanagarians under the control of the demon Onimar Synn, who he was instrumental in destroying.

==== 52 and Mystery in Space ====
A year after the events of Infinite Crisis, Captain Comet is captured and tortured by Lady Styx, forcing him to jettison his primary consciousness from his body before death. His psychic self merges with The Weird, which had been drifting in space since his death, before both are revived in new bodies. Shortening his name to Comet and fostering the misconception that he was his own nephew, he searched for the remains of his old body on Hardcore Station, discovering that it had been stolen by the Eternal Light Corporation Church and he was being hunted by a team of their telepathic assassins. On breaking into the Eternal Light Corporation's building, he uncovered that brainwashed cloned telepaths were being grown from the charred remains of his corpse, which he destroyed. Becoming a fugitive, he hid from the E.L.C. so they could not use his new body to continue their cloning—allowing thousands of Hardcore residents to die when the E.L.C. cut off life support to a whole area of Hardcore Station to force them to surrender Comet. Eventually, he destroyed all the clones and the E.L.C., killing hundreds of their followers.

==== Rann–Thanagar Holy War, Strange Adventures (vol 3) and R.E.B.E.L.S. ====
Target of an assassination attempt by a surviving E.L.C. follower during a resurgence of the faith, Comet accepted an offer by Adam Strange to leave Hardcore Station and help quell growing religious fanaticism on Rann. He ended up working with Adam Strange, Hawkman, Starfire, The Weird, and Starman against the influences of the warring Lord Synnar (a cosmic tyrant behind the Eternal Light Corporation) and Lady Styx on Rann and Thanagar (which once again set the two planets on course for war). Their interference was eventually key in Synnar's plans to reach a higher plane of existence.

Later, Comet learned from the future spirit of Synnar that he is destined to be one of "The Aberrant Six": a group critical to preventing Synnar (trapped in The Weird's body) from destroying the universe. Ultimately the Aberrant Six did not form, and the future Synnar was forced to leave after Comet's mercenary friend Eye was killed by Synnar's supreme god-enemy. Comet was entrusted with Eye's robot companion, Orb, until Synnar returns to "continue his negotiations". Comet then returned to Hardcore Station, and almost immediately joined Vril Dox's new R.E.B.E.L.S. He entered into a brief relationship with Starfire and helped defeat Starro, saving Rann, the Vega System and the galaxy.

=== The New 52 ===
Adam Blake is re-introduced in The New 52 continuity reboot during Grant Morrison and Rags Morales' revamp of Action Comics. After his abilities manifest, he is shunned by society and adopted by a group of aliens called the "Oort kind". Comet returns to Earth to collect Suzie Lane, Lois Lane's niece, who like himself is a Neo-Sapian, which brings him into conflict with Superman, until Suzie uses her powers to drive Comet away.

When the fifth-dimensional demon Vyndktvx attacks Superman, Comet returns with his fellow Neo-Sapians to assist. They subdue the Kryptonite Men and rescue Krypto while Comet deals with the Phantom King, before helping to banish Vyndktvx back to the Fifth Dimension.

Comet then appears in Telos #2 as part of a resistance on Colu. Along with Techne (Brainiac's daughter), K'Rot and Stealth, they help Telos and Brainiac take down Computo, the ruler of Colu.

== Powers and abilities ==
Captain Comet in Rann–Thanagar War #5 (2005), art by Ivan Reis.

Captain Comet is supposedly the pinnacle of human evolution. His mutant mental functions not only give him genius level I.Q. but endow him with a photographic memory and telepathy, enabling him to read or control people's minds (including alien races). He has telekinetic powers, which enable him to use his thoughts to move, lift, and alter matter without physical contact, mentally lift himself to fly at high-speed, create barriers of psychic force to deflect physical attack, and fire bursts of psionic energy that strike with concussive impact, sometimes in the form of lightning or fire blasts. He has an accelerated healing and his telekinetic shield can simultaneously protect him from the vacuum of space and surround him with a breathable environment.

Captain Comet's brain also contains evolved sensory centers enabling him to clairvoyantly "see" events outside of his range of sight. His evolved physiology originally made him superhumanly strong and durable, enough to lift a large spaceship and fight toe to toe with beings such as Lobo. After his resurrection, however, his physical power was significantly diminished, although his mental and psionic abilities have been enhanced. He has also acquired a teleportation ability that can be used on others as well as himself, but normally requires an hour to recharge after every "jump".

== Other versions ==
=== Elseworlds ===
Captain Comet has also appeared in a number of DC Comics titles which do not fit into normal continuity:

- DC Challenge (November 1985 – October 1986)
- Kingdom Come (1996): Captain Comet was a member of Superman's reformed Justice League. He was chosen by Superman to be warden of the Gulag, the holding facility/prison for metahumans who chose to defy the Justice League, and is killed in a prison riot.
- The Golden Age (1991): Captain Comet makes a brief appearance in the final issue, briefly taking part in the battle against Dynaman. This took place in 1951, the first year of his crime fighting career.
- In the DC Tangent "Earth-9" universe, Captain Comet was an African-American superhero from that reality's Chicago who was killed in Czechoslovakia trying to prevent a war in Europe. He was resurrected, and sought revenge for the bombing of a US Army base.
- He also made a brief appearance in the Elseworlds tale JLA: Another Nail (2004), when all time periods melded together.
- An older version of Captain Comet fights against the tyranny of Vril Dox in the Armageddon 2001 crossover. He loses his then-wife, Marijin, in the battle and then is killed himself.

== In other media ==
- Captain Comet makes a non-speaking cameo appearance in the Batman: The Brave and the Bold episode "The Siege of Starro!".
- Adam Blake appears in Naomi, portrayed by Chase Anderson.
- Captain Comet appears as a character summon in Scribblenauts Unmasked: A DC Comics Adventure.

== Collected editions ==
- Several stories from the 1950s Strange Adventures series were reprinted in Mysteries in Space: The Best of DC Science Fiction Comics ed. Uslan, Michael (Fireside Books/Simon and Schuster, 1980), ISBN 0-671-24775-1
- The DC Comics Presents story in issue #22 (June 1980) was reprinted in Showcase Presents: DC Comics Presents Superman Team-Ups Vol. 1, (paperback) 512 pages (DC Comics, 2009), ISBN 1-4012-2535-7
- The 2006 Mysteries in Space series has been reprinted in two volumes:
  - Mystery in Space with Captain Comet: Volume One (paperback), 208 pages (DC Comics, 2007), ISBN 1-4012-1558-0
  - Mystery in Space with Captain Comet: Volume Two (paperback), 288 pages (DC Comics, 2008), ISBN 1-4012-1692-7
- The Rann–Thanagar Holy War series has been reprinted in two volumes.
- The Strange Adventures (vol. 3) series has been reprinted.
- The DC Encyclopaedia – Dougall, Alastair (Dorling Kindersley, 2004, 2008, ISBN 0-7566-4119-5)
- DC Finest Science Fiction: The Gorilla World contains several Captain Comet stories from 1953–1954.
