= List of Ambush Bug–related published material =

This is an incomplete list of Ambush Bug or Ambush Bug-related comics.

== Early appearances ==
Before Ambush Bug received his own mini-series, he appeared in DC Comics Presents #52 and #59 as a villain, later becoming a hero in Supergirl #16. He discovered that Clark Kent is really Superman in Action Comics #560; revealed his origin in issue #563; and in issue #565, tried (and failed) to get Batman, Superman, the Teen Titans, and Wonder Woman to appear in his mini-series. In DC Comics Presents #81 (his last pre-series appearance), he switches bodies with Superman for 48 hours.

== Ambush Bug (mini-series) ==
In this series, Ambush Bug battles bombers that "killed" his sidekick Cheeks in issue #1, and then he turned Quentin Quantis (in mutated form) human again in issue #2. In issue #3, he talked about lesser known characters and, in issue #4, had his showdown with Darkseid, while in the last issue, he meets Argh! Yle!

=== Characters ===
==== Issue #1 ====
- Ambush Bug
- Cheeks, the Toy Wonder
- Unnamed bombers
- Guardian Angel
- Darkseid

==== Issue #2 ====
- Ambush Bug
- Orton
- Quentin Quantis
- Two scientists Quentin swallowed
- Darkseid

==== Issue #3 ====
- Ambush Bug
- Egg Fu
- Wonder Tot
- Blinky
- Super Turtle
- Quisp
- Legion of Super-Pets
- Green Team
- Cheeks, the Toy Wonder
- The Viuarium being
- Bat-Mite
- Cryll
- Doodle Duck
- Inferior Five
- Ace the Bat-Hound
- Mopee
- Bizarro Ambush Bug
- Unnamed blob
- Jonni DC
- Darkseid

==== Issue #4 ====
- Ambush Bug
- Darkseid

==== Issue #5 ====
- Ambush Bug
- Argh! Yle!

== Ambush Bug Stocking Stuffer ==
In this one-shot, Ambush Bug's toy sidekick turns into a cannibal zombie, so it is up to Ambush Bug to stop him.

=== Characters ===
- Ambush Bug
- Cheecks, the Toy Wonder
- Jonni DC

== Son of Ambush Bug ==
In this second mini-series, Ambush Bug tries to stop the Interferer (a former comic book writer with god-like powers) before being sent to court for "contempt of comics". He is then kicked out of the DC Universe.

=== Characters ===
- Ambush Bug
- Cheecks, the Toy Wonder
- Argh! Yle!
- The Uh-Oh Squad
- The Interferer
- Two-Face

== Post-Son of Ambush Bug ==
Despite the end of the Son of Ambush Bug series, Ambush Bug reappears in Secret Origin #48, where he refuses to reveal his origins.

== Showcase Presents Ambush Bug ==
In 2009, DC Comics released a black-and-white, 478-page collection of comics featuring Ambush Bug (ISBN 978-1401221805).
