= Blasters (comics) =

DC Comics team of superhumans

- Blasters Special #1, art by James Fry.

Publication information
- Publisher: DC Comics
- First appearance: Invasion! #1 (March 1989)
- Created by: Peter David (writer); James Fry (artist)

In-story information
- Member(s): Snapper Carr; Churljenkins; Jolt; Looking Glass; Dust Devil; Frag; Crackpot

The Blasters are a fictional DC Comics team of superhumans who first appeared in the miniseries Invasion! #1 by Keith Giffen, Bill Mantlo and Todd McFarlane. Blasters Special #1 (March 1989) was produced by the creative team of Peter David and James Fry.

== Publication history ==
The Blasters were supposedly a pet project of Robert Loring Fleming. Fleming brought the Blasters in as guests when he took over the Valor series. He was later forced to leave them in limbo, as the Zero Hour plans for the Legion soon overshadowed the book.

== Fictional team history ==
Fifty humans from around the world are abducted by the Dominators and their allies and placed in an arena full of horrifying high-tech weapons and land mines to test for the possibility of a metagene. Of the fifty test subjects, only six survive. The six test positive for superhuman abilities and a unique genetic marker that Dominator scientists would later dub the metagene.

This proves to the Dominators that humanity is a threat and that Earth and its people are too dangerous to remain free. Thus the Dominators join the Thanagarians, Psions, and others in the Alien Alliance.

=== Starlag ===
The six survivors are locked away on a prison world known as Starlag. In time, they discover that their fellow prisoners are the legendary Omega Men from the Vega system, and Vril Dox as well as other future members of L.E.G.I.O.N. Working together they overthrow the Starlag guards and hijack an independent shuttle piloted by Churljenkins, a cat-like alien. En route to Earth, their shuttle encounters a superhuman task force headed for the Dominator homeworld to find a cure for the Dominators' gene bomb. The two groups combine, and the six humans, now nicknamed the Blasters, help end the invasion. The Blasters return to Earth in Churljenkins' ship.

=== Blasters ===
Each human has trouble adjusting to their new powers; Fritz Klein (Frag) has to take tranquilizers to maintain his temper so that he would not spontaneously combust. Children taunt Moshe Levy (Dust Devil) for pretending to have super-powers. Carlotta (Jolt) was slowly going mad trying to control her repulsion field. Snapper is placed in a mental institution; he had kept his eyes open during a transport and gone mad as a result.

Later, Snapper escapes from the asylum by teleporting directly to Churljenkins' ship. It had broken down on a tiny alien world. The two "steal" the ship from the Omega Men leaving them stranded there. The two intend to go to Churl's to home. They discover that her home planet had been destroyed to make a spaceway to Earth for the Alliance. Returning to Earth, Snapper and Churljenkins discover a Spider Guild weapons depot. Snapper re-unites the Blasters and the team puts an end to the Guild's operation. They also alert the Justice League to its existence.

=== Starlag II ===
The team decides to stay united and travel the spaceways as goodwill ambassadors to repair Earth's reputation among the galactic community. After wandering for a while, the Blasters begin to question the wisdom of their decision. As they are about to disband and return to Earth, they receive a distress call from Babbage, Valor's assistant. Valor was wrongly imprisoned in Starlag II by its warden Kanjar Ru, sister of Kanjar Ro. When the team break into Starlag II, they unintentionally release a being known as the Unimaginable that threatens to destroy Starlag II. The Blasters are trapped as the prison is destroyed. Their fate following this incident remains a mystery.

The Unimaginable's next appearance would be on Earth in the pages of Supermen of America #5 by Fabian Nicieza.

=== Lost ===
At some point after this, Snapper Carr is separated from his teammates. He does not know if they are dead or alive and expresses guilt over their unknown fate. While searching for them, he is captured by some Khunds, who cut off his hands. He is rescued by operatives of L.E.G.I.O.N., who give him new hands, but he has lost the ability to teleport. Snapper is then returned to Earth, as seen in Hourman #20-21.

== Membership ==
- Snapper Carr - The former mascot of the Justice League, who gained the ability to teleport whenever he snaps his fingers.
- Churljenkins – A green catlike alien and space pilot who became Snapper Carr's girlfriend.
- Jolt - Carlotta Rivera, a fashion model from Madrid, Spain. She could generate a gravimagnetic field that repelled anything near her skin, even water and oxygen.
- Looking Glass - Dexter Fairfax, a British writer of children's books, from the town of Tunbridge Wells, England. He can transform his torso into living glass.
- Dust Devil - Moshe Levy, a young student from Tel Aviv, Israel. He can generate a funnel of fast moving air, a miniature tornado.
- Frag - Fritz Klein, a ski instructor based in Innsbruck, Austria. can transform into living metal and fire explosive blasts.
- Crackpot - Amos Monroe, a self-professed African-American con artist from New Orleans, United States. If he remains calm, he can cause people to believe nearly anything.

=== Supporting characters ===
- Gunther - A renegade Dominator scientist.
- Ms. Levy - Dust Devil's overprotective mother.

== Bibliography ==
- Invasion #1-3 (1989)
- Blasters Special #1
- Valor #5-8
- Hourman #20-21
