= Super-Turtle =

Publication information
- Publisher: DC Comics
- First appearance: Adventure Comics #304 (January 1963)
- Created by: Henry Boltinoff

In-story information
- Full name: Tur-Tel
- Species: Turtle
- Place of origin: Galapagon
- Abilities: Same range of powers as Superman

Super-Turtle (or Super Turtle) is a fictional character from DC Comics, created by Henry Boltinoff; he is depicted as a bipedal anthropomorphic turtle wearing a cape like Superman's. His emblem, which is on his cape, is a letter T in a shield.

== Publication history ==
Created to be a lighthearted parody of Superman, Super-Turtle appeared mostly in one-page comic stories in Silver Age comic books, starting in Adventure Comics #304 (January 1963).

An accepted part of DC Comics history, Super-Turtle has also made minor appearances outside his own series; e.g., a Super-Turtle figure hangs from the ceiling of the Planet Krypton restaurant in Kingdom Come and he had a cameo appearance in the one-shot Superman and Batman: World's Funnest. Two one-page Super-Turtle stories were created for and appeared in the 2000 Silver Age series.

His most recent comic book appearance was in the 2008 miniseries Ambush Bug: Year None, in which he plays a role like the one Superboy-Prime played in Infinite Crisis; after living in Limbo with Kal-L and company, Super-Turtle (who now calls himself Clark Kent) starts destroying anyone he considers to be a phony Super-Turtle, including Bat-Mite and Conner Kent.

Super-Turtle makes a cameo in the final issue of Batman: The Brave and the Bold.

Super-Turtle has since appeared in Sleepy Time Crime from Capstone Publishing's DC Super-Pets line of children's books.

== Fictional character biography ==
Super-Turtle is part of a species of anthropomorphic turtles from the planet Galapagon. The scientist Shh-Ell realizes that the planet is doomed and convinces the Science Council to evacuate. Slow by nature, the turtles only build one spaceship, in which Shh-Ell's infant son, Tur-Tel, is sent to Earth. There, he is adopted by a kindly farmer couple and becomes Super-Turtle.

Super-Turtle's enemies and allies include parodies of Superman's (such as Brainy-yak) and, in curious circumstances, Superman himself.

== Powers and abilities ==
Super-Turtle has the same powers as Superman, including flight, invulnerability, superhuman speed and strength, and vision powers.

== Appearances ==
Super-Turtle appeared in the following comics:

=== Silver Age ===
- Action Comics #299, 301, 305, 309, 318, 321, 336, 374, 381 (1963-1969)
- Adventure Comics #304, 312, 316–317, 326, 329, 341–342, 363, 377, 379 (1963-1969)
- Superboy #103, 105, 107–108, 110, 113–114, 127, 130, 156 (1963-1969)
- Superman #159, 162, 170, 175, 181, 188, 190 (1963-1966)
- World's Finest Comics #149, 151–152, 154, 156, 158, 166, 181 (1965-1968)
- Superman's Pal Jimmy Olsen #90-91, 115 (1966-1968)
- The Brave and the Bold #70 (1967)

=== Modern Age revivals ===
- Ambush Bug #1, 3 (1985)
- Silver Age 80-Page Giant #1 (2000)
- Silver Age Secret Files and Origins #1 (2000)
- Superman and Batman: World's Funnest (2001)
- Ambush Bug: Year None #3 (2008)
