= Ambush Bug: Year None =

2008-09 comic book limited series

- Cover of Ambush Bug: Year None #1 (September 2008).

Publication information
- Publisher: DC Comics
- Schedule: Monthly
- Format: Limited series
- Genre: Humor/comedy, superhero
- Publication date: September 2008 – January 2009 and December 2009
- No. of issues: 6 (numbered #1-5 and #7)
- Main character: Ambush Bug

Creative team
- Written by: Keith Giffen; Robert Loren Fleming
- Artist(s): Keith Giffen; Al Milgrom
- Penciller: Keith Giffen
- Inker: Pat Brosseau
- Colorist: Guy Major
- Editor: Jann Jones

Ambush Bug: Year None is a six-issue comic book limited series written by Keith Giffen and Robert Loren Fleming, and illustrated by Giffen and Al Milgrom. The first issue, "Hey, You Sank My Battle-Ax!", was published on July 23, 2008. DC Comics announced that instead of releasing a sixth issue, the series would skip issue #6 and conclude with issue #7. Ambush Bug: Year None #7 was released on October 28, 2009.

== Plot ==
The first issue, "Hey, You Sank My Battle-Ax!", revolves around Ambush Bug trying to solve the murder of Jonni DC, a female version of Johnny DC. Recognizing that the murder is problematic, the beginning of the story references the "women in refrigerators" trope, with Ambush Bug trying to buy a refrigerator that does not have a corpse in it. Through the story, Ambush Bug encounters various characters, including Yankee Poodle, Egg Fu, Ace the Bat-Hound, and 'Mazing Man. During his investigation, he is pursued by the living sock Argh!Yle! and "Go-Go Chex", a mysterious being whose face is covered with a checkerboard pattern. Occasionally, the Source Wall appears vacationing in the form of a sentient concrete slab.

The second issue makes fun of Zatanna's mindwipe of the Secret Society of Super Villains in Identity Crisis, Rama Kushna, the OMACs, Babe the Blue Ox from Jack of Fables, Space Ranger, the Green Lantern Corps, Zook, Mister Nebula, and the death of Blue Beetle. Go-Go Chex continues to pursue Ambush Bug. In the Mister Nebula segment, he briefly joins the Amber Butane Corps, a parody of the Green Lantern Corps.

In the third issue, Ambush Bug discovers that he and Dumb Bunny (a member of the Inferior Five) got married in Las Vegas while he was drunk. He spends most of the issue traveling between universes to escape the marriage. During this time, he encounters Neron, Darkseid, Super-Turtle, Jerro the Merboy, the Odd Man, and Go-Go Chex.

The fourth issue starts by referencing a mistake made in issue #2, where a page was printed without dialogue balloons. DC editor Dan DiDio takes responsibility for the mistake before Ambush Bug inadvertently kills him. The issue does not focus on Ambush Bug for the first half, focusing on Argh!Yle and Mitsu Bishi in a parody of 52. In trying to find Ambush Bug, they feature the Golden Age Robin, Renee Montoya, and most of the main characters from 52. Near the end, Ambush Bug chats with Argh!Yle on Wonder Woman's invisible speaker phone and confirms that he is alive and is not DiDio. He is kidnapped by the Ambush Bug Revenge Squad, who argue over obscure comic book quotations while Ambush Bug gets bored and escapes.

The final issue of the miniseries was delayed for more than six months for undisclosed reasons. Fans speculated that the delay was related to the departure of DC's senior coordinating editor Jann Jones, as she was included in the story as a character. The final issue of the series was released on October 28, 2009.
