= Superman and Batman: World's Funnest =

2000 comic book

- Cover art by Brian Bolland

Publication information
- Publisher: DC Comics
- Format: One-shot
- Genre: Superhero, humor
- No. of issues: 1
- Main character(s): Mister Mxyzptlk; Bat-Mite

Creative team
- Written by: Evan Dorkin
- Artist: Various

Superman and Batman: World's Funnest is an American single-issue prestige format comic book published in 2000 by DC Comics. Written by Evan Dorkin and illustrated by many artists, it is a parody of the World's Finest Comics pairing of Batman and Superman.

It is an Elseworlds tale and as such is not considered part of the main DC canon/continuity. Despite the title, Batman and Superman play only a small role in the story which stars instead Mr. Mxyzptlk and Bat-Mite as the main protagonists. The book pokes fun at many comic book conventions and DC heroes from the Golden through to the Modern Ages. Its setting is a multiverse similar to the Pre-Crisis DCU but also includes references to other Elseworlds tales (Kingdom Come and Batman: The Dark Knight Returns), the modern DCU, the DCAU and even pays a visit to Crisis on Infinite Earths.

== Plot ==
The story starts in typical Silver Age comics series World's Finest-style with Superman, Batman and Robin handing over the supervillain team of Lex Luthor and the Joker to the authorities. Bat-Mite and Mister Mxyzptlk appear simultaneously, the former to see his hero, Batman, in action, and the latter to torment Superman. As the two imps clash, Superman, Batman, Robin, Luthor, and the Joker are killed, as are all the other heroes who come to their aid (including Batwoman, Bat-Girl and Supergirl, the Justice League of America, the Legion of Super-Pets, the Legion of Super-Heroes and the Spectre). Their fight eventually consumes the Earth, the universe and even the Phantom Zone.

As all of that reality has been destroyed, Bat-Mite flees to Earth-Two pursued by Mxyzptlk. Earth-Two is in turn destroyed. The rest of the book follows the formula of each new world they encounter being destroyed in the battle between the two imps, Bat-Mite fleeing and Mxyzptlk pursuing to another world/universe which is then destroyed. In the process they generally mock the characters/comics they encounter, often breaking the fourth wall and lampooning how seriously people "inside" comics take themselves, given the often unbelievable or silly circumstances they encounter.

Ultimately, having worked their way through to the Kingdom Come universe, Mxyzptlk simply throws a "magic bomb" at Bat-Mite who deflects it back with the helmet of Kingdom Come's Flash (the only thing that survived). Both are completely exhausted and begin to laugh, admitting that the whole thing has been a lot of fun. They reset reality to the Silver Age beginning, vowing to meet again "next Tuesday". The impression is given that the preceding events are a part of a common recreational activity among magical imps.

== Worlds/universes ==
The worlds/characters they visit include:

- Earth-One (art by Dave Gibbons)
- The Phantom Zone (art by Mike Allred)
- Earth-Two (art by Sheldon Moldoff)
- Earth-Three (art by Stuart Immonen)
- Earth-X (art by Frank Cho)
- Earth-S (art By Jaime Hernandez)
- Earth-C (art by Scott Shaw)
- Our reality (possibly Earth-Prime) (photography)
- Jack Kirby's Fourth World, specifically Apokolips (art by David Mazzucchelli)
- The Super Friends
- The DCAU (art by Bruce Timm)
- The Fifth Dimension (Mxyzptlk negates the one condition of his magic, that saying his name backwards will send him back to the Fifth Dimension, by entirely destroying the Fifth Dimension) (art by Jim Woodring).
- The Dark Knight Returns (art by Frank Miller)
- The modern DCU (art by Doug Mahnke)
- Crisis on Infinite Earths (art by Phil Jimenez)
- Rip Hunter (cameo only, art by Ty Templeton)
- The Atomic Knights (cameo only, art by Ty Templeton)
- DC's Western Heroes (cameo only, art by Ty Templeton)
- Earth-Four (cameo only, art by Ty Templeton)
- Enemy Ace (cameo only, art by Ty Templeton)
- Gemworld (cameo only, art by Ty Templeton)
- Heaven (cameo only, art by Ty Templeton)
- Tomahawk (cameo only, art by Ty Templeton)
- Sgt. Rock (cameo only, art by Ty Templeton)
- Earth-86 (cameo only, art by Ty Templeton)
- Space Cabbie (cameo only, art by Ty Templeton)
- Tangent (cameo only, art by Ty Templeton)
- 'Mazing Man (cameo only, art by Ty Templeton)
- Sugar and Spike (cameo only, art by Ty Templeton)
- Stanley and His Monster (cameo only, art by Ty Templeton)
- DC One Million (cameo only, art by Ty Templeton)
- Warlord (cameo only, art by Ty Templeton)
- Super-Turtle (cameo only, art by Ty Templeton)
- Earth-12 (cameo only, art by Ty Templeton)
- O.M.A.C. (cameo only, art by Ty Templeton)
- Batman Beyond (cameo only, art by Ty Templeton)
- Kingdom Come (art by Alex Ross)

== Illustrators ==
Illustrators for Superman and Batman: World's Funnest include:

- Mike Allred
- Brian Bolland
- Frank Cho
- Dave Gibbons
- Jaime Hernandez
- Stuart Immonen
- Phil Jimenez
- Doug Mahnke
- Frank Miller
- Sheldon Moldoff
- Alex Ross
- Scott Shaw
- Ty Templeton
- Bruce Timm
- Scott Lye

== See also ==
- List of Elseworlds publications
