= R.E.B.E.L.S. =

Fictional comic book characters

- Cover of R.E.B.E.L.S. ’94 #0.

Group publication information
- Publisher: DC Comics
- First appearance: (R.E.B.E.L.S. ’94); R.E.B.E.L.S. ’94 #0 (October 1994) (R.E.B.E.L.S. ’09); R.E.B.E.L.S. #1 (February 2009)

In-story information
- Type of organization: Paramilitary
- Leader(s): Vril Dox

R.E.B.E.L.S.

Series publication information
- Format: Ongoing series
- Genre: Science fiction, superhero
- Publication date: (vol 1); October 1994 – March 1996 (vol. 2); April 2009
- Number of issues: (vol. 1); 18

Creative team
- Writer(s): (vol. 1); Tom Peyer (vol. 2); Tony Bedard
- Artist(s): (vol. 2); Andy Clarke; Claude St. Aubin

Collected editions
- The Coming of Starro: ISBN 1-4012-2589-6

Revolutionary Elite Brigade to Eradicate L.E.G.I.O.N. Supremacy (R.E.B.E.L.S.) is the name of two separate revolutionary groups appearing in comics books published by American company DC Comics. Both incarnations have been L.E.G.I.O.N. adversaries and are led by Vril Dox.

== Publication history ==
R.E.B.E.L.S. '94, R.E.B.E.L.S. '95, and R.E.B.E.L.S. '96 is a comic-book series of contiguous numbering published by DC Comics from October 1994 to March 1996 and created by Tom Peyer. The three "series" consisted of issues #0–2, 3–14 and #15–17.

R.E.B.E.L.S. is a comic-book series published by DC Comics which debuted in February 2009. Writer Tony Bedard and artist Andy Clarke comprise the creative team. It ended in May 2011 with issue #28.

== First team ==
=== Background ===
R.E.B.E.L.S. is a team of ex-lawmen on the run from their former peace-keeping organization, L.E.G.I.O.N. Led by Vril Dox, R.E.B.E.L.S. roster includes among others Strata, Borb Borbb, Stealth and Lobo. An alien telepath, who went by the name of 'Telepath' was unwillingly part of the team. At first Telepath was imprisoned but was later let free and assists the team.

Vril Dox's insane, super-smart toddler son had taken over Dox's organization and turned it into a ruthless, brainwashing dictatorship. The group escapes the coup in a semi-sentient ship that literally runs off brain power.

Green Lantern, Kyle Rayner, guest-starred in the first issue and was manipulated into killing some of the group's pursuers.

Vril would confront his ex-girlfriend Ignea, who wields flame powers and attempts to burn him to death. John Sin, the leader of a criminal organization called the Blood Circle, causes Vril to become addicted to a certain drug without his knowledge. Vril's shipmates believe he has perished until they hear rumors of his existence from a doctor who had come to treat Garv, the injured husband-to-be of Strata. The Blood Circle is taken down and Sin learns Vril plans to replicate the drug until he can wean himself off it.

Further conflict is caused by Borb Borbb who does not know how to keep his romantic feelings for Stealth appropriately restrained.

Captain Comet becomes involved, as he returns to confront what L.E.G.I.O.N. has turned into.

The team is forced to fight old friends, such as Zena Moonstruk, Gigantus and Davroth. Behind the scenes, help comes from old ally Marij'n, who fails in her attempt to stop a brainwashing broadcast. The group also encounters the demon Neron. Borbb sacrifices himself to save the group from brain-harvesting extra-dimensional entities. The team then gains the assistance of a guard captain who had been caught up in their adventures.

The heroes regain control in the last issue of the series. Dox and Stealth retire to take care of Lyrl, while Captain Comet is placed in charge of L.E.G.I.O.N.

=== Membership ===
- Vril Dox
- Strata
- Stealth
- Lobo
- Flamingo (Cletusman)

== Second team ==
Promotional cover of R.E.B.E.L.S. '09 #1.

=== Background ===
Dox finds his authority of L.E.G.I.O.N. usurped a second time. Hunted by the organization he founded, Dox once again assembles a team in hopes of regaining control of L.E.G.I.O.N.

=== Story ===
Vril Dox, upon losing control of his L.E.G.I.O.N. robots is forced to flee and is followed to Earth by a team of bounty hunters (one of which turns out to be Amon Hakk, an ex-member of Vril's original team). He finds Supergirl and has her heat vision encrypt a file onto a CD. Brainiac 5 of the Legion of Super-Heroes had contacted his ancestor and told him to do so. Upon uploading the disc, Brainiac Five contacts Vril directly and offers him the entire data catalogue on the Legion of Super-Heroes in order for Vril to set up a new team and to guarantee the survival of the Brainiac lineage into the 31st century. Instead of using the heroes, Vril Dox decides to use the data of their villains. The Omega Men are also seen fleeing from attacking L.E.G.I.O.N. robots. Vril manipulates Hakk into shooting the other bounty hunter. He seizes a device that was used to control Tribulus, a giant simian beast, and implants it into his head. Vril gains control over Tribulus and they take the bounty hunter ship as their new headquarters. Vril finds the next member of the team, Wildstar, old and sick and convinces her that he can heal her. After luring her onto his ship he shoots her with an energy gun, leaving her in an energy form and trapped in a containment suit. Wildstar contemplates killing Vril, but instead helps him escape her home planet and the two of them hunt down Strata and Bounder. Strata tries to convince Wildstar that she will be turned on soon enough if she stays with someone like Vril Dox. The Omega Men discover a secret plot involving Starro.

=== Membership ===
- Vril Dox
- Strata
- Tribulus
- Bounder
- Ciji
- Wildstar
- Amon Hakk
- Garv
- Adam Strange
- Captain Comet
- Kanjar Ro
- Xylon
- Starfire
- Lobo
- Lyrl Dox a.k.a. Brainiac 3

=== Reception ===
Comics Bulletin found the writing in the first issue "uninspired" but was more impressed by the "excellent" art. They felt that "[i]t is so good that it brings all of the glaring weaknesses of the book to the surface". Comic Book Resources is more positive, saying that the first issue is "a compelling opening chapter, and one that's worth taking a gander at".

== Collected editions ==
The original 1994-96 series has never been collected.

The 2009 series was collected into four trade paperbacks:

- Volume 1: The Coming of Starro (collects R.E.B.E.L.S. #1–6, 144 pages, January 2010, ISBN 1-4012-2589-6)
- Volume 2: Strange Companions (collects R.E.B.E.L.S. #7–9 and Annual #1, 128 pages, August 2010, ISBN 1-4012-2761-9)
- Volume 3: The Son and the Stars (collects R.E.B.E.L.S. #10–14, 144 pages, December 2010, ISBN 1-4012-2911-5)
- Volume 4: Sons of Brainiac (collects R.E.B.E.L.S. #15–20, 144 pages, February 2011, ISBN 1-4012-3017-2)
- Volume 5: Starstruck (collects R.E.B.E.L.S. #21–28, 160 pages, December 2011, ISBN 1-4012-3286-8). This volume was cancelled and has never been published.
