= Lunatik =

Publication information
- Publisher: Marvel Comics
- First appearance: The Defenders #51 (Sept. 1977)
- Created by: Keith Giffen

In-story information
- Alter ego: Arisen Tyrk, Harrison Turk
- Team affiliations: Empire State University

Lunatik is a fictional character appearing in American comic books published by Marvel Comics.

== Publication history ==
Lunatik first appeared in Defenders #51 (September 1977), though a later retcon identifies him as an incarnation of Arisen Turk, a character who appeared in Creatures on the Loose #35-37 (May-September 1975), which was written by David Anthony Kraft and pencilled by George Pérez. According to Kraft, he had been trying to link Lunatik to the Creatures on the Loose story arc during his time as writer on Defenders, and his successor Ed Hannigan picked up on this, but made a different connection between the two than Kraft had had in mind. Keith Giffen stated "Lunatik was a character I came up with in high school. When it went radically wrong, I went to DC [Comics and] took the basic concept of Lunatik and ... split [it] into two characters: Lobo had his mercilessness, and Ambush Bug had his goofiness."

The character was created and designed in a hurry, with his appearance based on Alice Cooper, when Giffen suddenly left Marvel to work for DC Comics.

The character subsequently appears in Defenders #51-53 (September-November 1977), #55-56 (January-February 1978), #61-62 (July-August 1978), #64-65 (October-November 1978), Marvel Premiere #45-46 (December 1978, February 1979), and Defenders #70-73 (April-July 1979).

An unrelated character named Lunatik appears in Marvel Comics Presents #172-175 and Lunatik #1 (December 1995). He is a cosmic mercenary who is later killed by Drax the Destroyer.

== Fictional character biography ==
=== Arisen Tyrk ===
Arisen Tyrk is the tyrannical god-king of the dimension called Other Realm. He seeks the power of the Godstone, which is bonded to John Jameson as the Man-Wolf. Tyrk hires Kraven the Hunter to attack Man-Wolf, but Man-Wolf fights Kraven off. Rebels from Other Realm bring the Man-Wolf to their land and he deposes Tyrk.

Tyrk tries to escape through an extra-dimensional portal, but the portal is damaged and fragments Tyrk into a number of forms in a number of realms. Four of Tyrk's fragments go to Earth, becoming the crazed Lunatik. These four duplicates of Tyrk plague the Defenders until they are reunited to recreate the original Lunatik. He fights the Defenders in this form, but they eventually defeat him.

For a time, he poses as drama professor Harrison Turk at Empire State University.

=== Mercenary ===
There is also a cosmic mercenary by the name of Lunatik. He kills one of Tyrk's fragments, claiming that he does not like anyone else "using his name". This Lunatik is seen on a prison ship, the Dredge 01, on its way to the Kyln. The ship crashes on Earth, with Drax the Destroyer, Paibok, and the Blood Brothers as the only survivors. Lunatik is killed by Drax, who crushes his head.

== In other media ==
Lunatik appears in Guardians of the Galaxy, voiced by John DiMaggio. This version is an old friend of Star-Lord who owns a nightclub on the Grandmaster's space station, the Conjunction.
