= Lobo (character) =

DC Comics character

- Lobo in Lobo #1 (November 1990). Artwork by Simon Bisley.

Publication information
- Publisher: DC Comics
- First appearance: Omega Men #3 (June 1983)
- Created by: Roger Slifer; Keith Giffen

In-story information
- Species: Czarnian
- Team affiliations: Justice League; L.E.G.I.O.N. Young Justice; Church of the Triple-Fish God; R.E.B.E.L.S. Suicide Squad; Red Lantern Corps
- Notable aliases: The Main Man; The 'Bo; Master Frag; The Last Czarnian; Mister Machete; Scourge o' the Cosmos; The Ultimate Bastich; Machete Man; El Cazadores; The Lord of Death
- Abilities: Superhuman strength, stamina, reflexes and senses.; Expert marksman and hand-to-hand combatant; Regeneration; Immortality; Invulnerability; Genius level intellect; Cloning (formerly)

Lobo is an antihero appearing in American comic books published by DC Comics. He was created by Roger Slifer and Keith Giffen, and first appeared in Omega Men #3 (June 1983). He is an alien from the planet Czarnia, and works as an interstellar mercenary and bounty hunter. Lobo was first introduced as a hardened villain in the 1980s, but he soon fell out of use with writers. He remained in limbo until his revival as a bounty hunter with his own comic in the early 1990s. One of the key factors in this revival was considered to be the distinct and influential artwork of Simon Bisley, whose exaggerated and dynamic style helped redefine the character and significantly contributed to his popularity.

Writers attempted to use Lobo as a parody of the 1990s trend towards "grim and gritty" superhero stories, but he was instead enthusiastically accepted by fans of the trend. This popularity led to the character having a much higher profile in DC Comics stories from then on, as well as starring roles in various series in the decades since.

Lobo has been adapted into media outside comics. Brad Garrett, David Sobolov, John DiMaggio, and Fred Tatasciore, among others, have voiced the character in animation and video games. Lobo made his live-action debut in Krypton (2018–2019), portrayed by Emmett J. Scanlan, and made his cinematic debut in the DC Universe film Supergirl (2026), portrayed by Jason Momoa.

== Character development ==
The character had a short run as one of DC's most popular characters throughout the 1990s. This version of Lobo was intended to be a satire of the Marvel Comics superhero Wolverine. Simon Bisley's biker lifestyle played a significant role in shaping Lobo's design, infusing the character with a rugged, rebellious aesthetic that resonated with fans.

In a 2006 interview, Keith Giffen said: "I have no idea why Lobo took off... I came up with him as an indictment of the Punisher, Wolverine hero prototype, and somehow he caught on as the high violence poster boy. Go figure". He later stated that both Lobo and Ambush Bug were derived from Lunatik, a character he created in high school.

In issue #41 of Deadpool, a separate Marvel series, Lobo was parodied as "Dirty Wolff", a large blue-skinned man who drove a demonic motorcycle. He was also parodied in the Image Comics series Bloodwulf and as "Bolo" in the Topps Comics series Satan's Six. Lobo was Stan Lee’s favorite DC Comics character.

== Publication history ==
The cover of The Omega Men #3 (June 1983), the first appearance of Lobo

Lobo was introduced as a regular character in Keith Giffen and Roger Slifer's Green Lantern and Teen Titans spin-off The Omega Men. At that time, he was a Velorpian whose entire race had been exterminated by Psions and was partnered with Bedlam, whom he later killed; his origin was later retconned.

After a well-received appearance in Justice League International, Lobo became a regular character in L.E.G.I.O.N. and its successor series R.E.B.E.L.S..

In 1990, he appeared in his own four-issue miniseries, Lobo: The Last Czarnian, plotted by Giffen, written by Alan Grant and with art by Simon Bisley, which changed his origin story: he became the last Czarnian after violently killing every other member of the species. That mini-series led to many subsequent miniseries and specials, including Lobocop, a RoboCop parody; Blazing Chain of Love, in which he is sent on a job to a harem; Paramilitary Christmas Special, in which he is contracted by the Easter Bunny to assassinate Santa Claus; Infanticide, where he kills his daughter and all of his other offspring that she has gathered to try to kill him; Convention Special, a send-up of comic book conventions; and Unamerican Gladiators, in which Lobo takes part in a televised deadly game show. Lobo also starred in his own DC title for 64 issues, from 1993 to 1999.

Lobo has regularly made guest appearances in other series and in cross-company interactions with such non-DC characters as the Mask, Judge Dredd, and the Authority. During the DC vs. Marvel crossover series, he fought Wolverine and lost due to popular vote by the fans. He appeared briefly in the JLA/Avengers inter-company crossover and is shown fighting members of the Shi'ar Imperial Guard; although the outcome is not shown, it is mentioned that the Guard had trouble containing him.

Lobo received a new ongoing series in March 2026 as part of the "DC Next Level" publishing initiative, with Skottie Young writing and Jorge Corona providing art.

== Fictional character biography ==
Lobo is a Czarnian with exceptional strength and fortitude. He enjoys nothing better than mindless violence and intoxication, and killing as an end in itself; his name roughly translates as "he who devours your entrails and thoroughly enjoys it". He is arrogant and self-centered, focusing almost solely on his own pleasures, although he proudly lives up to the letter of his promises – but always no more or no less than what he promised. Lobo is the last of his kind, having killed most of his species with a scorpion-like creature. It is later revealed that some Czarnians survived: Lobo's teacher and former military officer Miss Tribb, and the population of a city that Brainiac stole centuries prior.

Lobo as he appears in 52 #17 (2006), illustrating a more tactical look during his revised origin storyline. Art by Keith Giffen, Jack Jadson, and The Hories.

Physically, Lobo resembles a chalk-white human male with red pupilless eyes and blackened eyelids. Like many comic book characters, Lobo's body is highly muscular, though his initial appearances were thinner compared to later iterations. Originally portrayed with neatly trimmed purple-grey hair, this was soon redesigned as a gray mane, later a long, straggly, gray-black rocker hair, dreadlocks, and more recently a pompadour. Similarly, the orange-and-purple leotard he wore in his first few appearances was replaced by black leather biker gear and was later replaced with both the robes of his office as a putative Archbishop and pirate-themed gear, then later a sleeveless flight suit/jumpsuit. His arsenal includes numerous guns and a titanium chain with a hook on his right arm. Extra weapons may include "frag grenades" and giant carving blades.

Lobo has a strict personal code of honor in that he will never violate the letter of an agreement, though he may gleefully disregard its spirit. He is surprisingly protective of space dolphins, some of which he feeds from his home. A few have been killed in separate incidents, which he avenges with his usual violence.

Lobo's friends include Dawg, a bulldog that he often claims is not his when it gets into trouble; Jonas Glim, a fellow bounty hunter; Ramona, a bail bondswoman/hairdresser; and Green Lantern Guy Gardner.

Dawg is stomped to death by Lobo in Lobo (vol. 2) #58, in which he again claims to Superman that the dog is not his; this is for the final time. Somehow, Dawg later appears alongside Lobo when Lobo goes to Earth to fight Green Lantern and Atrocitus. His enemies include the do-gooder superhero parody Goldstar, Loo, Vril Dox, Bludhound, Etrigan the Demon, and General Glory. Lobo generally tries to kill anyone he is hired to capture, including his fourth-grade teacher Miss Tribb, his children, Santa Claus, and Dawg, although his main targets are Superman and Deathstroke. Lobo frequents a restaurant, Al's Diner, where he often flirts with waitress Darlene Spritzer. Though Lobo protects these two from frequent danger, he does not seem to understand the distress caused by his tendency to destroy the diner. Al and Darlene later prosper due to Lobo's appetite for destruction; he destroys the city, except for the diner, leaving hordes of construction workers with only one place to eat lunch. He also ends up destroying a diner Al gives to him as part of a birthday celebration.

The last revelation of Lobo and the diner appears to be in the pages of Lobo (vol. 2) #1,000,000 (November 1998), where his last adventure is depicted. By the time of the action, he is already obese and working as a carnival attraction, scaring tourists into leaving their money behind. Then, a sexy client appears to offer him one last job: finding legendary evildoer Malo Perverso. At the prospect of a last well-paid job and a chance to score with the client, Lobo quickly agrees, and he again invades the diner to use their Tesseract teleporter to reach his gear. It is revealed then the "client" is none other than Darlene, who wanted to see him in his prime rather than see him sink into sloth.

After reaching his gear, Lobo invades the HQ of the International Justice Legion Wanna-Bes and crushes all opposition to hack their files on Malo Perverso. There, he is attacked by Perverso, who then reveals himself to be Clayman. Clayman also squeals that the real Perverso went into a black hole. Lobo, still eager to find his bounty, goes into the black hole. Ironically, due to Lobo's interference in a planetary conflict in the same issue, Al later gets a package through the Tesseract for Lobo – which promptly blows the diner up yet again.

At one point, Lobo has trouble with a clone of himself that had survived previous misadventures. A battle between the two makes it unclear which of them survived.

Lobo has participated in several money-making schemes, such as being a priest and a pop-rock idol. Most of these schemes tend to end with the violent deaths of nearly everyone involved. He has many friends among the bounty hunter world, though many tend to die when they are around Lobo, either by his hand or at the hands of the enemies he faces.

=== Crossovers ===
Lobo has both clashed and cooperated with Superman. He has also encountered Batman a couple of times, although one of these encounters was in an Elseworlds continuity. He has both fought and teamed up with Guy Gardner more than once, helping him to destroy various alien threats to Earth. Lobo often visits Warriors, Guy's bar, where he enjoys free drinks.

He fights Aquaman when a traveling space dolphin visiting Earth is killed by Japanese fishermen. He ceases fighting when he learns Aquaman is not only a friend to dolphins, but was raised by them. Although Lobo feels he cannot hurt a fellow dolphin lover, he has no such mercy for the fishermen.

Lobo also has appeared with the Authority. In one such appearance, Jenny Quantum finds a comic book detailing Lobo's murder of Santa Claus; she experiences a fit of rage and confusion. She breaks the barrier between her dimension and the dimension Lobo inhabits in the comic book, and Lobo finds himself in a fight with the Authority.

Lobo has also had run-ins with Hitman, Valor, Starman, the Ray, Deadman, Green Lantern, the JLA, StormWatch, Mister Miracle, the Legion of Super-Heroes, Captain Marvel, Wonder Woman, Doctor Fate, the Sovereign Seven, Supergirl, and Superboy, among others.

=== L.E.G.I.O.N./R.E.B.E.L.S. ===
Lobo acts as an independent bounty hunter until tricked by Vril Dox into nominally joining his interstellar police force, L.E.G.I.O.N. However, he continues solo activity, which seems to often bring him to Earth and in conflict with its heroes. Or, as in one case, base indifference. He remains loyal to Vril Dox after L.E.G.I.O.N. leadership is usurped by Dox's son, until an altercation between Lobo and Dox prompts Dox to release Lobo from his service. After this, Lobo becomes a full-time bounty hunter again.

=== Li'l Lobo ===
In the year 2000, a magical accident transforms Lobo into a teenager. In this condition, he joins Young Justice and eventually accompanies them to Apokolips, where he is killed in combat. However, the aforementioned magical accident has restored his ability to grow clones from a single drop of blood, and millions of Lobos rush into battle against Apokoliptian soldiers, whom the Lobos quickly defeat. The Lobos then turn on each other, until only one is left; in the process, the surviving Lobo regrows to adulthood. His time as a member of Young Justice becomes a distant memory. An additional weaker teenage Lobo remained, however, having hidden from the fight; he rejoins Young Justice and chooses to rename himself Slobo. Slobo's body later degenerates, leaving him blind. Before Slobo can die, Darkseid transports him to the 853rd century and transforms him into a sentient, immobile statue.

=== 52 ===
In the 2006–07 miniseries 52, Lobo reappears and encounters a group of heroes (consisting of Adam Strange, Animal Man, and Starfire), who find themselves stranded in space after the events of the 2005–2006 "Infinite Crisis" storyline. To everyone's surprise, he does not kill them. Lobo professes to have found religion, becoming the spiritual leader of Sector 3500, which was left in shambles by an unknown assailant. He is the current caretaker of the Emerald Eye of Ekron. After helping the lost heroes defeat Lady Styx, he brings the Emerald Eye to the triple-headed fish god, who agrees to release Lobo from his vow of non-violence in exchange. When told that the Emerald Eye is the only thing that can kill the fish god, Lobo blasts him with it.

=== One Year Later ===
Lobo appeared in "Deadly Serious", a two-part crossover miniseries with Batman in August 2007, written and drawn by Sam Kieth. In addition, Lobo has fought the Teen Titans and Blue Beetle in their respective titles to stop a rocket for the Reach, in which he failed.

In the Reign in Hell miniseries, it is revealed that Lobo's soul was still in Hell following a deal he made with Neron during the 1995 Underworld Unleashed storyline. Lobo's suffering was enough to power Neron's whole castle. Lobo was freed from his prison in a battle between Etrigan the Demon and Blue Devil, and he traveled through Hell to seek revenge on Neron. To buy time to fully recover before battling Lobo, Etrigan stole Blue Devil's soul and informed him that he would have to fight Lobo to get it back. During Lobo's rampage he cut off Zatara's head, forcing his daughter Zatanna to send him to the Abyss, the soul death.

Later, Lobo is shown aiding the JLA during their mission into Hell, where he helps Fire defeat the god Plutus.

=== "Brightest Day" ===
In the 2010 "Brightest Day" storyline, Lobo appears on Earth to capture a bounty on Atrocitus's head. After fighting Hal Jordan, Carol Ferris and Sinestro, he then flees. It is revealed that the fight was staged by Atrocitus himself. As a payment, Lobo is given a Red Lantern ring.

=== R.E.B.E.L.S. ===
Still wearing his red ring on a chain around his neck, Lobo is recruited from a bar by Vril Dox, who requires his help battling his "father" Brainiac and Pulsar Stargrave, a captured weapon. Even losing his spacehog, Lobo saves the planet Colu, but with Brainac and Stargrave escaping. Lobo became a senior member of Dox's Legion based on the planet Rann. Lobo was the key to defeating Starro the Conqueror and his lieutenants, ensuring security for Rann, the Vega system and the galaxy. Unknown to Lobo, the Psions had created clones of Lobo attempting to bring back the Czarnian race, which could make them unstoppable, but the series ended before this was played out.

=== The New 52 ===
A redesigned Lobo holds up the severed head of his predecessor to symbolise his replacement in Justice League (vol. 2) #23.2 (published September 11, 2013).

In 2011, DC Comics rebooted the DC Universe continuity in an initiative called The New 52. A reimagined version of Lobo debuted in Deathstroke (vol. 2) #9, written by Rob Liefeld. This Lobo is a Czarnian slaver who killed the rest of his race except for his beloved Princess Sheba. A second version, claiming to be the real Lobo and resembling the original version of the character, was introduced in Justice League (vol. 2) #23.2. He was originally the bodyguard to the Czarnian royal family, who utilized a Eucharist-like ritual involving the planet's "life blood", pools similar to Lazarus Pits. Drinking or bathing in these pools granted participants regenerative abilities, connecting them and the Emperor to the entire planet. However, an unknown party contaminated the "life blood", causing anyone who participated in the ritual to go insane, which in turn forced Lobo to commit planetary euthanasia. A new series featuring this version of Lobo debuted in October 2014 and concluded with its December 2015 issue.

=== DC Rebirth ===
In 2016, DC Comics implemented a relaunch of its books called DC Rebirth, which restored its continuity to a form much as it was prior to The New 52. Lobo debuts in Justice League vs. Suicide Squad as one of the villains freed by Maxwell Lord, evidently restored to his pre-New 52 persona. He is a member of Amanda Waller's first Suicide Squad. Batman eventually implants a bomb into Lobo's brain and detonates it, blowing up Lobo's head. After Lobo regenerates it, he discovers Batman did so to free him from Lord's control, and he later accepts Batman's offer to join a new incarnation of the Justice League to repay the favor. In Hal Jordan and the Green Lantern Corps, the New 52 incarnation of Lobo is imprisoned in one of Brainiac's bottles. Guy Gardner almost frees him, before Hal Jordan grabs the bottle and tells him it is better to "leave him on the shelf".

Lobo appears in the storyline DC K.O., where he takes part in the eponymous tournament to combat Darkseid. Following the tournament, Lobo joins the Justice League as part of an amnesty deal.

== Powers and abilities ==
In all comic books, Lobo is portrayed as a ruthless bounty hunter. He only has one rule: once he takes a contract, he finishes it no matter what, even if it means risking injury. If he has a counter-contract for even more money, then he will fulfill the new one.

Lobo possesses extraordinary strength of undefined limits. His strength, much like his other powers, varies greatly depending upon different artistic interpretations by various comic book writers. In some instances, he is depicted as being barely able to lift a mid-size vehicle overhead while, in others, he demonstrates physical strength on a similar level to Superman. This extended to his legs, providing him considerable leverage and leaping abilities under any kind of planetary atmosphere. He has shown to be a match in strength for Etrigan the Demon each time that they have met.

Lobo also possesses superhuman durability, which varies greatly too. Lobo is depicted, in some situations, as being injured by conventional bullets while, in other situations, he has the physical resiliency to stand toe to toe with Superman, survive unprotected in deep space, and withstand high level destructive weaponry and powerful explosive blasts without sustaining injury. He has displayed particular susceptibility to gaseous chemicals. In one instance, Lobo was declared immortal; after he died and went to Hell, he proved too much for the demons and, when he was then sent to Heaven, he wreaked so much havoc that he was permanently banished from the afterlife.

If Lobo sustains injury, his accelerated healing factor enables him to regenerate damaged or destroyed tissue with superhuman speed and efficiency and little apparent pain. Lobo also is functionally immortal. He is immune to the effects of aging and disease. As such, even though he can sustain sufficient injury to be out of commission for quite some time, he will apparently heal from any injury, given sufficient time. For instance, Lobo can regenerate out of a pool of his own blood, apparently recycling the cells.

Across several continuities, Lobo has shown superior senses. It is said that once he "catches" the smell of his marks, there is no place in the universe these can hide from him. His hearing is able to listen through great distances, making him both a terrific tracker and fighter. Lobo also possesses a special, unspecified sense that detects the weak point of any opponent.

He is a combatant with expertise in multiple forms of armed and unarmed combat. His favorite weapon is a large titanium alloy chain with a large gutting hook connected at the end, often referred to as "the garrote", that he keeps wrapped around his right wrist. At times, he also uses high-grade explosives, edged weapons and advanced firearms.

Despite his violent and loutish nature, Lobo seems to have a genius-level intellect in matters of destruction and violence. He can create complex virulent agents and the corresponding antidotes. In one version of his backstory, he released such a plague on Czarnia as a school science project. This resulted in the deaths of the entire population in the span of one week, he then proceeded to give himself an "A". His vehicle, some sort of space-faring motorcycle (the "Space Hog"), often accompanies him. It is of his own design and, despite its size, it is capable of extended and speedy travel throughout space. Further, it protects those in its immediate vicinity from the hazards of space and somehow permits the ability to breathe and speak. He was also able to scavenge parts from a destroyed time hopper and attach them to his own bike, producing a working time machine. Lobo is fluent in many alien languages (according to Lobo, 17,897) and extremely knowledgeable in the locations and cultures of worlds without external references. Lobo is known for his awkward behavior and love for cigars. He was once known to destroy an entire planet for not finding the cigar of his liking.

It is not fully known if the extent of his powers is common for his race or unique to him. In the miniseries The Last Czarnian and elsewhere, it is stated that the cloning and healing abilities are traits possessed by all Czarnians, as is the apparent ability to survive in the vacuum of space. Before the reboot, Lobo was granted a Red Lantern Power Ring by Atrocitus during the "Brightest Day" storyline.

== Other versions ==
- Lobo appears in the two-part Lobo vs. the Mask crossover.
- Lobo the Duck, a fusion of Lobo and Marvel Comics character Howard the Duck, appears in the Amalgam Comics universe.
- Lobo appears in Tiny Titans.
- Lobo appears in Bob, the Galactic Bum.

== Collected editions ==
- Lobo by Keith Giffen & Alan Grant Vol. 1 (Lobo #1-4, Lobo: Paramilitary Christmas Special #1, Lobo's Back #1-4, Lobo: Blazing Chain of Love #1 and Lobo Convention Special #1)
- Lobo by Keith Giffen & Alan Grant Vol. 2 (Lobo: Infanticide #1-4, Lobo: Death and Taxes #1-4, Lobo #58, Authority/Lobo: Jingle Hell and Authority/Lobo: Spring Break Massacre)
- Lobo Big Fraggin Compendium Book One (Lobo Vol. 1 #1-4, Lobo Vol. 2 #0-9, Annual #1-2, Lobo Paramilitary Christmas Special #1, Lobo's Back #1-4, Lobo: Blazing Chain of Love #1, Lobo: Infanticide #1-4, Lobo: Portrait of a Victim #1, Lobo: Unamerican Gladiators #1-4, Lobo Convention Special #1, Lobo: A Contract on Gawd #1-4, Lobo: In the Chair #1, Green Lantern Corps Quarterly #8, Superman: The Man of Steel #30, The Demon Vol. 3 #11-15, The Omega Men #3, profile pages from Who's Who #8, and the Lobocop #1 parody)
- Lobo Vol. 1: Targets (Lobo Vol. 3 #1-6)
- Lobo Vol. 2: Beware His Might (Lobo Vol. 3 #7-9, Annual #1, DC Sneak Peek: Lobo)
- Sinestro Vol. 3: Rising (Lobo Vol. 3 #10-11, Annual #1, Plus Sinestro #12-15)
- Sinestro Vol. 4: The Fall of Sinestro (Lobo Vol. 3 #12-13 Plus Sinestro #16-23)
- Superman Vs. Lobo (Superman vs Lobo #1-3)
- Crush & Lobo (Crush & Lobo #1-8)

== In other media ==
=== Television ===
Lobo as he appears in Superman: The Animated Series

- Lobo appears in series set in the DC Animated Universe (DCAU), voiced by Brad Garrett.
  - Lobo first appears in Superman: The Animated Series. In his most notable appearance in the two-part episode "The Main Man", an alien called the Preserver hires him to capture Superman and add him to the Preserver's collection of endlings. After the Preserver decides to add Lobo as well upon realizing he is also an endling, the latter and Superman join forces to escape, with Lobo promising to leave Earth alone in return.
  - Lobo returns in the Justice League two-part episode "Hereafter". After Superman is sent to the future by Toyman and presumed dead, Lobo decides to replace him in the Justice League, which the Leaguers reluctantly agree to amidst their efforts to stop several supervillains running amok. Later, Superman returns to the present and ousts Lobo.
- Lobo appears in a self-titled Flash animated web series, voiced by Greg Eagles and Kevin Michael Richardson.
- Lobo makes a cameo appearance in the Legion of Super Heroes episode "Legacy".
- Lobo appears in Young Justice, voiced by David Sobolov.
- Lobo appears in DC Super Hero Girls (2015), voiced by Tom Kenny.
- Lobo appears in Justice League Action, voiced by John DiMaggio.
- Lobo appears in the second season of Krypton, portrayed by Emmett J. Scanlan. This version displays a vendetta against Brainiac, who destroyed Czarnia and stole his home city. A spin-off series focusing on Lobo was announced to be in development, with Scanlan reprising his role, but did not proceed following Krypton's cancellation.
- Olan Rogers pitched an adult animated series based on Lobo and his daughter Crush to Warner Bros. in 2020 before it was scrapped.
- Lobo makes a brief appearance in the web series *Krypto Saves the Day!.

=== Film ===
- Lobo appears in the independent short film The Lobo Paramilitary Christmas Special, portrayed by Andrew Bryniarski.
- In September 2009, Warner Bros. announced that Guy Ritchie was going to direct a live-action Lobo film that would have seen him travel to Earth and join forces with a teenage girl to find four fugitives. Ritchie was scheduled to begin production of Lobo in early 2010 and bring an "irreverent, gruff tone" to the film as he did with previous films Lock, Stock and Two Smoking Barrels and Snatch, though the studio was reportedly aiming for a PG-13 rating from the Motion Picture Association of America. After Ritchie left the project to pursue working on a sequel to his film Sherlock Holmes instead, production on the Lobo film was put on hold. In 2012, Brad Peyton was attached to write and direct the film. In July, Dwayne Johnson was in talks with Joel Silver and Brad Peyton to portray Lobo. However, in February of the following year, Johnson left the project to portray Black Adam in Shazam!. Jason Fuchs was later hired to write the Lobo film's script. Later in February 2018, Michael Bay was attached to direct the film after being inspired by the success of Deadpool.
- Warwolf, an Earth-Three incarnation of Lobo, makes a non-speaking cameo appearance in Justice League: Crisis on Two Earths as a member of the Crime Syndicate.
- Lobo appears in Lego DC Comics Super Heroes: Aquaman – Rage of Atlantis, voiced by Fred Tatasciore.
- Lobo appears in Lego DC Shazam! Magic and Monsters, voiced again by Fred Tatasciore.
- Lobo appears in films set in the Tomorrowverse, voiced initially by Ryan Hurst and subsequently by John DiMaggio.
- Lobo appears in Supergirl, portrayed by Jason Momoa. This version follows the trail of one of the men of the feared pirate Krem of the Yellow Hills with the goal of collecting his bounty, which leads him to ally himself with Kara Zor-El / Supergirl and the warrior Ruthye Marye Knoll.

=== Video games ===
- Lobo was set to appear as a playable character in a self-titled fighting game developed by Ocean Software before it was cancelled.
- Lobo appears as a downloadable playable character in Injustice: Gods Among Us, voiced again by David Sobolov.
- Lobo appears as a character summon in Scribblenauts Unmasked: A DC Comics Adventure.
- Lobo appears as a playable character in Lego Batman 3: Beyond Gotham, voiced by Travis Willingham.
- Lobo appears as a playable character in DC Unchained.
- Lobo appears as an unlockable playable character in Lego DC Super-Villains, voiced again by David Sobolov. Additionally, he serves as the narrator for several bonus missions and DLC levels.
- Lobo appears in Justice League: Cosmic Chaos, voiced by Rick D. Wasserman.

=== Miscellaneous ===
- Lobo appears in the novel DC Universe: Last Sons, written by Alan Grant and published in 2006.
- Lobo appears in Green Lantern: The Animated Series #13.

== See also ==
- List of Superman enemies
