= Lady Quark =

- Lady Quark, from the cover of L.E.G.I.O.N. '90 #22 (Dec. 1990).

Publication information
- Publisher: DC Comics
- First appearance: Crisis on Infinite Earths #4 (July 1985)
- Created by: Marv Wolfman; George Pérez

In-story information
- Alter ego: Tashana
- Place of origin: Earth-Six, Earth 48
- Team affiliations: L.E.G.I.O.N. Injustice Incarnate
- Abilities: Absorption of nuclear energies: Energy projection; Energy tracking; Superhuman strength; Superhuman durability; Self sustenance; Interstellar travel; Flight

Lady Quark is a fictional character, a superheroine in the DC Universe. In the DC Comics 12-issue limited series Crisis on Infinite Earths (1985-1986), the character was one of the rulers of Earth-Six, which was ruled by royalty. In the 2011 introduction of The New 52 multiverse, Quark and her husband Lord Volt are the monarchs of Earth-48, a modern analogue of Earth-Six.

== Fictional character biography ==
=== Crisis ===
Lady Quark comes from Earth-Six, where the American Revolutionary War was not won by the Thirteen Colonies and where technology has become more advanced than Earth-One. Lady Quark, her husband Karak ("Lord Volt"), and her daughter Liana ("Princess Fern") make up the royal family that rules Earth-Six.

During Crisis on Infinite Earths, Earth-Six is destroyed and Volt and Fern are killed. Quark is saved at the last minute by Pariah, a dimensional traveler. Quark helps most of the multiverse's surviving heroes and they journey to the dawn of time to battle the Anti-Monitor. After the Crisis is over, Quark resettles on Earth with Pariah and Harbinger.

Missing her husband, Quark approaches Will Payton with the idea of having him become her consort, but Payton rejects her advances.

=== L.E.G.I.O.N. ===
Lady Quark is recruited by Vril Dox to become a member of the peace-keeping force L.E.G.I.O.N. in L.E.G.I.O.N. '90 #18. Quark is later killed after a parasitic shapeshifter absorbs her memories and powers. Quark's corpse is seen floating in space, heavily maimed.

=== Return ===
Lady Quark returns in Villains United, in which she is captured by Sinestro at the request of Alexander Luthor Jr. She is imprisoned in Luthor's tower as part of his plan to restore the multiverse. Quark is later freed and joins Earth's heroes in defeating Luthor in Infinite Crisis.

=== The New 52 ===
In The New 52 continuity reboot, Lady Quark is revealed to have been imprisoned by Amanda Waller and A.R.G.U.S. Vibe releases Quark and the other prisoners, who proceed to attack A.R.G.U.S.

=== Multiversity: Earth-48 ===
In Grant Morrison's Multiversity series, Lady Quark and Lord Volt appear as residents of Earth 48 of The New 52's modified DC Multiverse. This iteration of Earth-48 is a fusion of the pre-Crisis Earth-Six and Warworld, which was Earth-48 in the series 52.

== Powers and abilities ==
Lady Quark is a metahuman with the ability to absorb and emit nuclear energy. She can direct these energies as percussive forces from her body. Her powers allow her to fly and travel through space.

== Other versions ==
An older version of Lady Quark becomes one-half of the tyrannical ruler of L.E.G.I.O.N.

Lady Quark is featured along with Lord Volt in a Convergence tie-in, where she battles Supergirl. Her daughter, Princess Fern, is featured in another Convergence tie-in, fighting Parallax.
