= Ambush Bug =

Fictional character

- Ambush Bug as depicted in Action Comics #565 (March 1985). Art by Keith Giffen.

Publication information
- Publisher: DC Comics
- First appearance: DC Comics Presents #52 (December 1982)
- Created by: Keith Giffen

In-story information
- Alter ego: Irwin Schwab (supposedly)
- Team affiliations: Doom Patrol; Uh-oh Squad; Justice League; Amber Butane Corps; Suicide Squad
- Notable aliases: Amber Butane of the Amber Butane Corps
- Abilities: Teleportation; Green suit provides limited protection from some attacks; Fourth wall breaks

Ambush Bug is a superhero appearing in American comic books published by DC Comics.

The character was created by Keith Giffen and Paul Kupperberg, and first appeared in 1982. Ambush Bug was intended as a deliberately silly character to spoof conventions of superhero comic books, often breaking the fourth wall. He was first portrayed as an incompetent villain, who was actually more of a nuisance than a serious threat, with delusional beliefs and the power of teleportation. He gradually became more of an anti-hero or bumbling do-gooder. Ambush Bug wore a green costume similar to a union suit or jumpsuit, but also covering the head and face and with two antenna emerging from the head.

His real name is supposedly Irwin Schwab, but Ambush Bug has mental problems that prevent him from truly understanding reality around him, so even his true identity might be no more than a delusion. His origin is disputed, although the most commonly accepted origin is that Brum-El (an allusion to Beau Brummell as well as Superman's father Jor-El) of the planet Schwab sent his clothes from his supposedly doomed planet, hoping that his wardrobe would survive, only to have it intercepted by a giant radioactive space spider. In the resulting crash, only two articles of clothing survived: the Ambush Bug suit, which was subsequently found by Irwin Schwab; and "Argh!Yle!", an argyle sock with a Doctor Doom–like complex, complete with metal mask.

== Publication history ==
Created by artist Keith Giffen, Ambush Bug first appeared in DC Comics Presents #52 (Dec. 1982) and would make appearances in several other Superman-related comic books in the early 1980s. Paul Kupperberg, who wrote Ambush Bug's first story, recalled, "as Keith was in the office, he sat in on the plotting and offered up Ambush Bug as an antagonist. The Bug is entirely Keith's creation ..." Giffen stated that both Ambush Bug and Lobo were derived from Lunatik, a character he created in high school. Giffen said that his original pitch was "Bugs Bunny as a super-villain".

In response to positive reader reaction to the character's first appearance, editor Julius Schwartz directed Giffen to create another Ambush Bug story for DC Comics Presents #59. At first, Ambush Bug was a villain, named after a type of insect, and having a green, skintight suit with two orange antennae containing miniature robot bugs that enable him to teleport. After attacking Superman and other heroes, Ambush Bug decides instead to be a superhero as well. He also fancies himself Superman's friend, which only annoys the hero even more than his early villainy. The costume becomes permanently affixed to his body, and he gains the power to teleport by himself. While trying to fix one of the miniature bugs, it explodes, causing a chain reaction and a blast that destroys all of the bugs and tints Ambush Bug's costume temporarily black; he then becomes capable of teleporting even without the bugs (briefly considering changing his moniker to Black Beetle instead).

Ambush Bug became popular enough to be featured in two comic book miniseries and several specials, plotted and pencilled by Keith Giffen and scripted by Robert Loren Fleming. The series contains many comic book-enthusiast and DC in-jokes and satire; series editor Julius Schwartz is also a character in the book.

During his own four-part series in 1985, he picks up a doll and, thinking it is alive, "adopted" it as a partner called "Cheeks, The Toy Wonder", complete with its own costume.

In 2001, Ambush Bug appears as a member of the "Justice League of Anarchy" alongside Plastic Man, the Creeper, Harley Quinn, 'Mazing Man, and the Trickster. This group of DC Universe troublemakers made a one-panel cameo in a series exploring variations on the JLA acronym, JLA: Justice League of Amazons.

Ambush Bug is largely considered an absurd character and is rarely used by other writers, though he still exists in the DC Universe and occasionally still appears in some DC Comics. His popularity amongst creators has led to many "cameos", sometimes with as little as his antennae being visible. In the 2006 series 52, Ambush Bug appears as part of Firestorm's short-lived Justice League of America. In Countdown to Final Crisis (2007), Jimmy Olsen briefly gains the appearance of Ambush Bug and subconsciously uses his power of "Dumb Luck" to locate Forager.

An Ambush Bug miniseries, Ambush Bug: Year None, debuted in 2008, plotted and pencilled by Giffen, and written by Fleming, with Jann Jones serving as editor. The final issue was published almost a year after the rest of the series. Dan DiDio claims to have lost issue #6, which was skipped to finish off the series with issue #7.

Ambush Bug was seen in the new Doom Patrol series in 2010 at the end of issue #9, arriving with his luggage and Cheeks. He appeared semi-regularly until the series ended.

Ambush Bug made another appearance, in issue #46 of the outside of regular DC continuity Tiny Titans series.

In The New 52 continuity reboot, Ambush Bug appears as a news reporter in the feature "Channel 52", which summarizes the comics' plots.

== Foes ==
=== As a villain ===
- Superman
- Doom Patrol
- Legion of Substitute Heroes

=== As a hero ===
- Argh!Yle! - A living argyle sock. The closest thing Ambush Bug has to an archenemy.
- Jonni DC - A "continuity cop" who pursues Ambush Bug for violations of DC Universe canon.
- Interferer - A former comic artist that gained god-like powers that he uses to "perfect" the universe.
- Go Go Chex - A villain from "Earth-6", where all the characters are stuck in the 1960s. He is themed around the "new look" DC gave all its books with a black and white checker pattern at the top. He speaks a hippy lingo and refers to everyone as "Wonder Chick", a nickname for Wonder Girl from the Teen Titans of that era.
- E.L.F. - A secret government agency who experimented with Ambush Bug's suit to try to discover its secrets.

== Powers and weapons ==
A series of panels describing Ambush Bug's suit being grafted to him. It also contains a reference to Spider-Man's black costume.

Ambush Bug's primary power is teleportation. At first, this was a function of his suit; he was limited to teleporting to where small receiver bugs were located. Later, after an explosion, Ambush Bug internalized this power. It became apparent, in DC Comics Presents #81, that the Bug used to have to say "Simon says" to teleport, but it is no longer necessary. Ambush Bug is also aware of his fictionality and aware of events in other publishers' comic books. He once was shown being able to follow the internal dialogue between Firestorm's component personalities. Ambush Bug also shows surprising agility and skill at unarmed combat, such as gouging the eyes of enemies attacking him from behind or knocking out members of the Legion of Substitute Heroes with a single blow. His unusual way of thinking is also a great advantage and often allows him to guess opponents' tactics and outmaneuver them, humiliating them in the process.

== Other versions ==
=== Amalgam Comics ===
Ambush the Lunatik, an intergalactic bounty hunter based on Ambush Bug and Marvel Comics character Lunatik, appears in Amalgam Comics' Lobo the Duck #1 (April 1997).

=== Elseworld's Finest: Supergirl & Batgirl ===
A heavily armored Ambush Bug appears in Elseworld's Finest: Supergirl & Batgirl as a member of the Justice Society of America.

=== Flashpoint ===
A group called the "Ambush Bugs" appear in the Flashpoint tie-in The Canterbury Cricket, consisting of Queen Bee, Blue Beetle, Firefly, Cockroach, and the Canterbury Cricket. They are formed to fight the Amazons, but all save for the Canterbury Cricket are killed by them.

== In other media ==
=== Television ===
Ambush Bug appears in the Batman: The Brave and the Bold series finale "Mitefall!", voiced by Henry Winkler. He tries to thwart Bat-Mite's attempts to make the show jump the shark and force its cancellation while assisting Batman and Aquaman in fighting Gorilla Grodd. While Bat-Mite succeeds and has the series replaced with a Batgirl series, Ambush Bug reveals it will have a dark tone and will not feature Bat-Mite before organizing a wrap party for the series' cast.

=== Video games ===
- Ambush Bug appears in DC Universe Online, voiced by Tracy W. Bush.
- Ambush Bug appears in Scribblenauts Unmasked: A DC Comics Adventure.
- Ambush Bug appears as a playable character in Lego Batman 3: Beyond Gotham, voiced by Sam Riegel.

=== Merchandise ===
- In 2005, WizKids added an Ambush Bug figurine to their HeroClix line.
- An Ambush Bug Minimate was released in 2008, in a two-pack with Lobo.
- McFarlane toys released an Ambush Bug action figure in 2024.

== See also ==
- List of Ambush Bug–related published material
