= General Glory =

- The Joseph Jones incarnation of General Glory as depicted in Who's Who in the DC Universe #11 (July 1991). Art by Linda Medley (penciller/inker) and Anthony Tollin (colorist).

Publication information
- Publisher: DC Comics
- First appearance: (Jones); Justice League America #46 (January 1991) (Wallace); Justice League Quarterly #16 (Autumn 1994)
- Created by: (Jones); Keith Giffen; J.M. DeMatteis (Wallace); Paul Kupperberg

In-story information
- Alter ego: Joseph Aloysius Jones; Donovan Wallace
- Team affiliations: (Jones) Justice League International; Justice League
- Abilities: Enhanced strength, olympic athlete in other areas

General Glory is the name of two DC Comics characters. The persona is mostly used by writers as a parody of Marvel's Captain America with exaggerated "patriotic values" and a sidekick called Ernie (aka Ernie the Battling Boy), who was similar to Bucky. General Glory first appeared in Justice League International #46 as a 1940s-style hero placed in a modern world, resulting in cultural differences and personality issues. Whereas Captain America is patriotic, heroic, and rational, General Glory is so blindly patriotic that it approaches the point of fault, unwilling and psychologically unable to believe that his country or international peacekeeping organizations have a dark side. He was introduced as a comic foil for the jingoistic Green Lantern corps member Guy Gardner in the early 1990s.

== Fictional character biography ==
=== Joseph Jones ===
Joseph Jones was a soldier in World War II who was granted superior abilities by Lady Liberty herself upon saying the words:

"Lady of Liberty, hear my plea —
For the land of the brave —
And home of the free!"

Jones becomes a government agent, under the authority of Agent Newkirk Sharp. Sharp arranged for General Glory comic books to be published, so that people would believe he was a fictional character. In England, his adventures were published in the pages of Tuppenny Fun.

During his many adventures in World War II, General Glory works with Beefeater, an English-based super hero. One mission saw him working with the time-travelling hero Booster Gold, who had come to 1943 looking for his missing adopted daughter and regards Glory as mentally unbalanced at best.

As with Marvel Comics' Captain America, General Glory disappeared in an Arctic mission. Rather than be encased in ice, however, he returned to America with little memory of his past. He would later learn that Sharp had drugged him and given him a new identity.

Many years later, Glory, having forgotten the magic words, is outbid by Guy Gardner for a General Glory comic book containing the words. He persuades Gardner to let him read the book by offering him the refund price of the bid. Reading the comic, Jones shouts out the magic words and becomes General Glory again. Shortly after this, he is arrested for treason by Ernest E. Earnest. It is later revealed that Sharp had framed Glory to divert suspicion from himself. Ernie confronts him and is shot. Sharp is brought to justice by Glory and the Justice League, with Glory becoming a member of the team.

=== Donovan Wallace ===
During one of Jones's transformations into his elderly self, he suffered a cardiac episode and ended up in the hospital next to New York City policeman Donovan Wallace, who had become paralyzed risking his life to save a child from gangsters. By this point, Jones was too weak to change into his alter ego, but he regaled Wallace with inspiring stories about his adventures as Glory. Initially skeptical, Donovan eventually came to believe in the spirit of glory and he was able to tap into the same energies that once powered Jones. He manifested great strength and agility, wings and throwing razors. He left his hospital bed and crushed the gangs that had crippled him. When he returned to the hospital, Jones was in cardiac arrest. To keep his legacy alive, Jones bequeathed his powers to Donovan, whose full mobility was restored. As Donovan becomes the second General Glory, Jones dies.

Wallace was known to be estranged from his wife and child, but in Justice Society of America (vol. 3) #3 it is revealed that Wallace and everyone attending his wedding was dismembered during the ceremony by a Nazi-themed team called the Fourth Reich. This group's mission, backed up by the villain Vandal Savage, was to destroy the legacy of all American heroes whose identities were closely tied to America itself.

== Powers and abilities ==
General Glory was mystically endowed with enhanced strength and durability, but only in his "General Glory" persona, otherwise he was a frail 80-year-old man. He has demonstrated enough strength to lift objects as heavy as tanks. He was in peak physical condition in all other aspects and a capable military tactician. He seemed impervious to the effects of old age in his superhero persona, but when he decided to go back to being an ordinary human he would die of old age.

The second General Glory demonstrated some different powers and weapons than the first. He had a sharp throwing star that would return to him after being released, and he also had golden wings that enabled him to fly.
