= Invasion! (DC Comics) =

DC Comic book

- Invasion Book One: The Alien Alliance, art by Bart Sears.

Publication information
- Publisher: DC Comics
- Schedule: Monthly
- Format: Mini-series
- Publication date: October – December 1988
- No. of issues: 3
- Main character: Justice League International

Creative team
- Created by: Keith Giffen, Bill Mantlo
- Written by: Keith Giffen; Bill Mantlo
- Penciller(s): Todd McFarlane (issue 1 and first half of issue 2); Bart Sears (issue 3 & all 3 covers); Keith Giffen (layouts for all 3 issues and pencils for second half of issue 2)
- Inker(s): P. Craig Russell; Al Gordon; Dick Giordano
- Letterer: Gaspar Saladino
- Colorist: Carl Gafford
- Editor: Andy Helfer

Collected editions
- Invasion!: ISBN 978-1-4012-2066-2

Invasion! was a three-issue American comic book limited series and crossover event published in 1988 by American company DC Comics. It was plotted by Keith Giffen, and ties up several plotlines from Giffen's other series, including Omega Men, Justice League International, and Legion of Super-Heroes. A trade paperback collection of the three issues was released on September 3, 2008.

The series was scripted by Bill Mantlo; it was his first work for DC after a long career at Marvel Comics. Pencils were by Todd McFarlane, Bart Sears, and Giffen himself; inks were by Joe Rubinstein, P. Craig Russell, Tom Christopher, Dick Giordano and Al Gordon. All three covers were pencilled by Bart Sears, including issue #1, contrary to DC's credits listing.

== The Alien Alliance ==
The alien coalition consisted of several disparate races; several had only appeared before with the Legion of Super-Heroes one thousand years in the future. Assembling this alliance was a major diplomatic victory for the Dominators, considering the animosities many of the members shared for one another (particularly the three races of the Vega system). As it worked out, the Dominators provided the overall strategy for the invasion, with input from each member world while the Khunds acted as the shock troops for the first wave of attack that overran Australia. Each member world was then tasked with invading or subverting a particular sphere of influence:

| Dominators: | The driving force behind the Alliance and the invasion of Earth, and consequently the Alliance's de facto leaders. |
| Khunds: | A brutish race of humanoid warriors. |
| Thanagarians: | Hawkman's people, now living under a fascist police state. |
| Gil'Dishpan: | An aquatic species who live within hovering, armored cybernetic shells. |
| Durlans: | A humanoid shapeshifting species. |
| Warlords of Okaara: | A race of warmasters from the Vegan star system. |
| Citadelians: | A species whose members are all clones of their leader, the Complex-Complex. They comprise the armies of the Vega system empire known as the Citadel. |
| Daxamites: | A species related to Kryptonians who possess similar abilities to them, but are vulnerable to lead rather than kryptonite. |
| Psions: | A reptilian species created as part of experiments by the beings who would one day become the Guardians of the Universe. |

- The Warlords of Okaara launch a major attack on European Russia. They battle Firestorm and Soviet metahuman forces, led by the Rocket Red Brigade.
- The Durlans infiltrate Cuba, kidnapping and then replacing Fidel Castro and leading members of the Cuban government and army. They were unmasked by the Flash and Manhunter.
- The Gil'Dishpan establish a major underwater base of operations within the Arctic Ocean, fighting the Doom Patrol, the Sea Devils, and the Atlantean military.
- The Khund spread out over many islands in Oceania, fighting both the United States Marine Corps and a number of heroes, including Power Girl, Firestorm, Firehawk, and Starman.
- The Psions conduct secret experiments on humans in Gotham City.
- The Alliance raid Wonder Woman's home of Paradise Island.

Additionally, some members of the Alliance are tasked with specific areas of responsibility and played little part in the military operations side. The Citadelians are given charge of administering the Alliance's vast Gulag of potential opponents and experimental subjects; the Psions are charged with (or left alone to) conducting biological research on humans; and the Daxamites are largely an observer group, providing medical and scientific assistance to the Alliance.

== Plot ==
The Dominators have put together an Alliance to invade Earth and eliminate the threat posed by metahumans. After purging the galaxy of numerous potential threats to their plan - securing Darkseid's non-interference by assuring him that they would not destroy the planet and thwart his quest for the Anti-Life Equation, assassinating many former members of the disbanded Green Lantern Corps, and attacking the Omega Men - the Alliance launches a massive attack on Earth, overrunning Australia and establishing a base there from which to conquer the rest of the planet. Meanwhile, the Spectre appeals to the Lords of Order to allow Earth's magicians to join in Earth's defense, only to be told that he must instead ensure their neutrality for fear of provoking the Lords of Chaos from intervening on behalf of the invaders and escalating the conflict into a cataclysm that would mean the destruction of everyone involved. The Alliance tenders an offer to spare the human race provided that the world's governments surrender their metahumans, but the United Nations General Assembly overwhelmingly rejects this offer.

Superman leads a counterattack against the main Alliance base. The counterattack is temporarily disrupted by the Daxamite observers, who become the equal of Superman and temporarily defeat him, but fall prey to Earth's atmospheric differences from their own world and how it affected their extreme and lethal sensitivity to lead poisoning. After Superman helps save them, they decide to withdraw from the Alliance and help defend Earth. To that end, a small fleet of troop transports arrive and demand that the Alliance withdraw from Earth. The Dominators decide to ignore them, unaware of the effect a yellow sun has on Daxamites, until the fleet deploys several thousand soldiers into space as a near invincible attack force. This, combined with key defeats in various theaters, and a full-scale and uncontrollable riot aboard the Alliance Gulag, leads to a quick collapse for the Alliance and individual surrenders by each former member.

However, a young Dominator, aspiring to prominence among his people, manages to isolate the "metagene" in humans that enables a person to develop superhuman powers. On his own initiative, he develops and deploys the Gene Bomb, a device that bathes the Earth in an energy that affects every metahuman exposed to it, causing them to lose control of their powers and fall into a coma. Since the point of the invasion was to harness these beings, not eradicate them, the Dominator is imprisoned by his own government. A group of heroes unaffected by the Gene Bomb, led by Martian Manhunter, manage to take information from the Dominator's mind crucial to reversing the effects of the Gene Bomb and restore the affected metahumans to health.

== Impact ==
"Invasion!" was DC's line-wide crossover event for 1988. It crossed over into 30 other DC comics and also featured guest appearances from other DC Universe staples such as Adam Strange, the planet Thanagar, and one-time Justice League of America sidekick Snapper Carr and his team the Blasters. The Blasters would make several more appearances, fighting further alien threats to Earth.

The invasion of Earth and the Gene Bomb had some long-lasting effects on the DC Universe. In particular, the recently relaunched Doom Patrol, a combination of the '60s, '70s, and brand new members, lost two team members and fell apart. This was done to give new writer Grant Morrison a clean slate to revamp the book, including the addition of new metahumans having powers awakened by the Gene Bomb. They started with Crawling From the Wreckage storyline starting in Doom Patrol (vol. 2) #19. Morrison used the Invasion fallout for a pair of Animal Man stories, including the acclaimed "The Death of the Red Mask". Also, the Gulag storyline introduced Vril Dox and the organization L.E.G.I.O.N., which received its own title soon after Invasion! ended.

The Gene Bomb was also responsible for giving powers of mind control to Maxwell Lord, but such powers were mostly unused. Another character from the Justice League International whose power was improved was Fire. Initially, she could only exhale bursts of fire, but after being affected by the Bomb she gained enhanced abilities akin to Marvel Comics's Human Torch.

One of the Dominators ended up under the control of Queen Bee, ruler of Bialya. Though he did not long survive her anger, the technology he introduced was used against the Justice League multiple times. Several other Dominators were left on Earth for years and appeared in various comics (usually briefly) including one in Captain Atom (became a farmer), a few in the Outsiders #44, and a cameo in a prison break in Flash. Also, a Dominator appeared in Joker: Last Laugh #3. A Khund was killed by Mongul during a prison break in Green Lantern.

The greatest impact of Invasion was its introduction of the metagene as the explanation within the DC Universe as to how some people gain superhuman abilities. The Flash's father, Rudolph West (a Manhunter agent) appears to die in an explosion in Cuba, defending the land during Invasion #2. His subsequent returns would plague the Flash and his mother multiple times. Unusual for the time, the three issues were published as perfect-bound comics, each the length of three usual comics - a throwback to the "80-page giants" of the Silver Age.

=== Characters affected by the Gene-Bomb ===
The following characters were affected by the gene-bomb enough to activate their meta-genes:

- Artist - Gained reality-shaping abilities.
- Atomic Skull -
- The Blasters
  - Crackpot - He gained the ability to cause people to believe nearly anything if he remains calm.
  - Dust Devil - He gained the ability to generate a miniature tornado.
  - Frag - He gained the ability to transform into living metal and fire explosive blasts.
  - Jolt - She gained the ability to emit a gravimagnetic field.
  - Looking Glass - He gained the ability to transform his torso into living glass.
  - Snapper Carr - He gained the ability to teleport upon snapping his fingers.
- Brainiac - He gained a massive psychic power boost.
- The Conglomerate
  - Booster Gold
  - Echo - She gained antipathy and flight.
  - Gypsy
  - Maxi-Man - He gained super-strength.
  - Praxis - He gained telekinesis and telepathy.
  - Templar - He gained telekinesis.
  - Vapor - She gained the ability to turn into a vapor cloud or a partial vapor cloud.
- Kay Challis - Each of her personalities gained their own powers.
- Deadline - He gained phasing abilities, enhanced durability, and enhanced reflexes.
- Fire - Her fire-breath ability was boosted.
- Rhea Jones - Underwent a metamorphosis that enhances her abilities.
- King of Spades (of Royal Flush Gang) - He gained immortality.
- Maxwell Lord - Gained mind-control powers.
- John Henry Martin - A death row inmate who gained super-strength and bodily projection.
- Mayfly - While having used Velocity 9 to gain super-speed, she gained super-speed for real when she was exposed to the Gene Bomb.
- Metamorpho - Was revived by the Gene Bomb.
- Josiah Power - He gained the ability to turn into a gray stone-like giant.
- Tasmanian Devil - Gained the ability to assume the form of a humanoid Tasmanian devil.
- White Dragon - He gained pyrokinesis.
- Wildman - He gained super-strength and enhanced durability.

=== Tie-in issues ===
In the reading order presented in the back of each main issue:

Invasion! #1:

- Daily Planet #1
- Checkmate! #11
- Firestorm (vol. 2) #80
- The Flash (vol. 2) #21
- Justice League International #22
- Manhunter #8
- Wonder Woman (vol. 2) #25
- Superman (vol. 2) #26
- The Adventures of Superman #449
- Animal Man #6
- Doom Patrol (vol. 2) #17
- Power of the Atom #7
- Starman #5
- Swamp Thing (vol. 2) #80-81
- Captain Atom (vol. 2) #24
- Detective Comics #595
- The New Guardians #6
- The Spectre (vol. 2) #23

Invasion! #2:

- Checkmate #12
- Firestorm #81
- The Flash (vol. 2) #22
- Justice League International #23
- Manhunter #9
- Wonder Woman (vol. 2) #26
- Superman (vol. 2) #27
- The Adventures of Superman #450
- Power of the Atom #8
- Starman #6
- Animal Man #7

Others (omitted from the #2 list):

- Suicide Squad #23
- Captain Atom #25
- The New Guardians #7
- Doom Patrol (vol. 2) #18

Invasion! #3:

- Justice League Europe #1
- Blasters Special #1
- L.E.G.I.O.N. '89 #1
- The Spectre (vol. 2) #24
- Invasion! Special: Daily Planet #1

DC also released a special edition of the Daily Planet as a tie-in to the storyline (the front page of which appears on the last page of Invasion! #1). Spun off from Invasion! were Blasters Special #1 and L.E.G.I.O.N. #1, the latter of which depicted an aftermath.

All tie-in issues between #2 and #3 ended with the gene bomb being detonated in Earth's atmosphere, so that the coloring of the artwork is flipped to a photo negative.

A number of stories make oblique or explicit reference to Invasion! without being explicitly tied-in via their covers, including Wonder Woman (vol. 2) Annual #1 and Wonder Woman (vol. 2) #24 (in which George Baines and Etta Candy track the invasion from the South Pacific), Swamp Thing #80 (in which the Dominators send Swamp Thing's essence back through time), The Spectre #22 (in which Jim Corrigan's team investigates cattle mutilations and continues directly into Invasion! #1), while The Flash (vol. 2) #20 has Wally West and Pied Piper shot by a Durlan before seeing the invasion fleet, and Suicide Squad #22 has Amanda Waller mentioning she must attend a special council with regard to Invasion. Animal Man #7 is not officially tied to Invasion!, but like the other aftermath titles, ends with the explosion of the gene bomb.

Swamp Thing #96-98 features a visit to Hell, in which the afterlives of many of the slain Invasion forces are seen.

== Collected editions ==
The 2008 trade paperback collection of Invasion! (containing only the three core issues) includes cover copy stating "Secret No More!" ISBN 978-1401220662. A new edition was released in April 2016.

== Other versions ==
- The Invasion! storyline was parodied in Marvel Comics' Uncanny X-Men #245. Among other elements, the "Gene Bomb" became the "Jean Bomb" (modelled in appearance on Jean Grey), said to have the power to "destroy relationships".
- The 2019 Inferior Five mini-series references the Invasion.

== In other media ==
- Invasion! was adapted into the second season of Young Justice, under the title Young Justice: Invasion. In this version, the Dominators and their alliance were replaced with the Reach.
- Invasion! serves as the inspiration for the 2016 crossover event between Supergirl, The Flash, Arrow and Legends of Tomorrow, with the Dominators featured as the main antagonists. With "cutting-edge prosthetics and computer effects", they are used for the Dominators "to achieve a feature film-quality look which is faithful to Invasion! artist Todd McFarlane's interpretation of the characters". Although Supergirl is part of the crossover, only Arrow, The Flash and Legends of Tomorrow have the episodes of the crossover titled as "Invasion!".
