= L.E.G.I.O.N. =

Group of fictional characters

- Cover of L.E.G.I.O.N. '90 #11 (January 1990), art by Kevin Maguire.

Publication information
- Publisher: DC Comics
- First appearance: Invasion! #1 (December 1988)
- Created by: Keith Giffen (writer & artist); Bill Mantlo (writer); Todd McFarlane (artist)

In-story information
- Base(s): Planet Cairn
- Member(s): Vril Dox; Strata; Tribulus; Wildstar; Garryn Bek

L.E.G.I.O.N. is a science fiction comic book created by Keith Giffen, Bill Mantlo and Todd McFarlane and published by American company DC Comics. The principal subject of the comic book is a team of fictional extraterrestrial superheroes. The characters first appeared in Invasion! #1 (December 1988). The original series chronicled the formation and activity of an interplanetary police force whose mission was to act as a peace-keeping force in their galaxy.

== Publication history ==
=== Invasion! ===
The characters who went on to form L.E.G.I.O.N. were first introduced in the three-part miniseries Invasion!

Vril Dox, Garryn Bek, Strata, Lyrissa Mallor, and the Durlan appeared as prisoners of the Alien Alliance who helped stage a breakout from the Starlag, a prison spacecraft overseen by the alien Citadel.

=== L.E.G.I.O.N. ===
L.E.G.I.O.N. '89 debuted in 1989 (as indicated by the title) and ended with issue #70 (as L.E.G.I.O.N. '94 in 1994). L.E.G.I.O.N. stands for Licensed Extra-Governmental Interstellar Operatives Network.

This series followed the adventures of Vril Dox and his allies after their escape from the Starlag in Invasion!. Dox takes his companions to Colu, where they overthrow the Computer Tyrants running the planet. They encounter the bounty hunter Lobo, who had been tracking Bek to exact revenge on him for having accidentally killed one of Lobo's treasured space dolphins. Dox smoothly and swiftly turns Lobo into a valued ally. With this group, Dox decides to form an interplanetary police force. He bases his operation on the planet Cairn after a difficult and bloody coup against Cairn's ruler, Bek's father-in-law, whom Dox shoots point blank. The series follows the rise, heyday, and fall of this police force.

=== R.E.B.E.L.S. ===
Following the Zero Hour event, the original title was replaced by R.E.B.E.L.S. '94 (Revolutionary Elite Brigade to Eradicate L.E.G.I.O.N. Supremacy) (beginning with issue #0), continuing the storyline with the same characters. R.E.B.E.L.S. '96 #17 was the final issue.

When L.E.G.I.O.N. is usurped by Vril Dox's son Lyrl Dox (who went by the name of Brainiac 3), Dox and those members who remain loyal to him (Lobo, Phase, Strata, Stealth, and Borb) are forced to flee in a mysterious new ship in order to regroup and regain control of L.E.G.I.O.N. Telepath comes along unwillingly. Garv, Strata's husband, unbalanced by not understanding recent events, becomes involved in a desire to get Strata back. Borb (who is in love with Stealth) sacrifices his life in order to protect his friends from an other-dimensional army of brain-stealing entities; the very ones that had created the ship they had been fleeing in. They soon name the ship the 'Di'ib', after an old L.E.G.I.O.N. hero.

The team has to fight old friends, such as Zena Moonstruk, Gigantus and Davroth. Behind the scenes help comes from old ally Marij'n and Captain Comet. The group also encounters the demonic entity Neron, who plays a critical role in the resolution of the main storyline providing the means to defeating Lyrl in exchange for the soul of a future generation of the Dox line.

The heroes regain control in the last issue, with Vril using the knowledge given to him by Neron to find a way to lobotomize his son, stripping him of his enhanced intelligence. Dox and Stealth retire to take care of Lyrl, whose brain has been reduced to that of a normal one-year-old, while Captain Comet is placed in charge of L.E.G.I.O.N.

=== Post-series appearances ===
In the 2004 Adam Strange (issues #5-8) and the later Rann/Thanagar War series (issues #1–6 and the Infinite Crisis special), Vril Dox has resumed control of L.E.G.I.O.N. and is using droids as officers. Adam Strange is pursued by the group in the pages of his own series, framed for the seeming destruction of Rann. Former L.E.G.I.O.N. members have been referred to in the subsequent Infinite Crisis series, and many make a cameo appearance in one panel of Infinite Crisis #1, although the lineup appears to be out of date (in addition to Darius' appearance on one of the screens, Bertron Diib is visible between several of the dialogue balloons). L.E.G.I.O.N. and Vril Dox are mentioned several times, although not shown, in Mystery in Space (2006) featuring Captain Comet. Dox plays a major role in the six-part Omega Men limited series (2006-2007).

=== R.E.B.E.L.S. (second series) ===
In 2009, R.E.B.E.L.S. returned as an ongoing series. According to writer Tony Bedard, he originally "pitched it as L.E.G.I.O.N. and then the Legion of Super-Heroes exploded.... We needed a title to emphasize that, despite the distant connection to the Legion, this is its own book. We didn't have to look far".

The new series opens with Dox a wanted criminal on the run from a L.E.G.I.O.N. made up of robotic constructs controlled by Silica, a living computer Dox had designed. While a robot-based, computer-controlled L.E.G.I.O.N. had made it easier for Dox to control the behavior of his police force throughout the 80 worlds under their protection (a common complaint of his in the first series), it also enabled the Star Conqueror (a.k.a. Starro) to wrest control of L.E.G.I.O.N. from Dox and make himself the de facto ruler of all the client worlds just by corrupting Silica. The first issues show Dox building his team based on instructions smuggled to him by Brainiac 5, a team that will be the prototype of the future Legion of Super-Heroes.

=== The New 52 ===
In The New 52 reboot of DC's continuity, L.E.G.I.O.N. still exists, but is unclear how much of its history remains intact. L.E.G.I.O.N. officers make a brief appearance in the Larfleeze backup story in Threshold #3. Stealth, a L.E.G.I.O.N. member in previous continuity, also appears in the main storyline of Threshold, although she is not affiliated with the organization.

== List of characters ==
=== Founding members ===
- Vril Dox II: A genius Coluan, he is the founder and leader of L.E.G.I.O.N. Dox is a clone of Vril Dox, the original Brainiac.
- The Durlan: A nameless Durlan and old friend of Dox. He is later revealed to be Legion of Super-Heroes benefactor R. J. Brande.
- Strata: A powerful crystalline female from the planet Dryad, of the same species as Blok.
- Stealth: A female alien from the planet Gryx. She is able to generate a sound-dampening aura that renders her completely undetectable.
- Garryn Bek: An ex-policeman from Cairn,
- Lyrissa Mallor: The champion of Talok VIII and an ancestor of Shadow Lass.

=== Later members ===
- Lobo: A Czarnian bounty-hunter.
- Phase: A mysterious female from the 30th century with power to "phase" through solid objects. Originally, she was Phantom Girl of the Legion of Super-Heroes; after Zero Hour, she was retconned to be one of Apparition's three selves, who was separated from her at birth.
- Lar Gand: A Daxamite who later becomes known as Valor.
- Lady Quark: The co-ruler and lone survivor of Earth-Six, which was destroyed during the Crisis.
- Captain Comet: A metahuman with advanced powers.
- Telepath: The last survivor of a hive-dwelling race from the planet Zsiglon.
- Marij'n Bek: The Cairnian wife of Garryn Bek.
- Garv: A powerful male alien who becomes Strata's lover.
- Amon Hakk: A Khundian recruit.
- Bertron Diib: An impervious alien recruit from Diibworld.
- Borb Borbb: An alien recruit with teleportation powers.
- Darius: An android recruit created on Acheron.
- Zena Moonstruk: A shy alien recruit who can absorb light and emit it as energy blasts.
- Ig'nea: A female recruit with pyrotechnic powers.
- Lydea Mallor: Lyrissa Mallor's daughter.
- Davroth Catto: An arrogant recruit from the planet Oziman with power of flight.
- Layla: A female humanoid who acquires powers in the Bloodlines crossover.
- Gigantus: The diminutive champion of Motus.
- Lyrl Dox: The super-intelligent son of Vril Dox and Stealth; also known as Brainiac 3.
- Taptree: A plant-like alien.

=== Deceased members ===
- Lyrissa Mallor
- Bertron Diib
- Ig'nea

=== Current members ===
- Vril Dox
- Tribulus
- Bounder
- Ciji
- Wildstar
- Amon Hakk
- Garv
- Adam Strange
- Captain Comet
- Xylon
