= Vril Dox =

Fictional character

- Vril Dox as depicted in L.E.G.I.O.N. '91 #27 (May 1991). Art by Dan Brereton

Publication information
- Publisher: DC Comics
- First appearance: Superman #167 (February 1964); Post-Crisis version: Invasion! #1 (January 1989)
- Created by: Edmond Hamilton (writer); Cary Bates (writer); Curt Swan (artist); Post-Crisis version: Keith Giffen (writer); Bill Mantlo (writer); Todd McFarlane (artist)

In-story information
- Alter ego: Vril Dox II
- Species: Coluan
- Place of origin: Colu
- Team affiliations: L.E.G.I.O.N. R.E.B.E.L.S. Sinestro Corps
- Notable aliases: Brainiac 2
- Abilities: Tenth Level Intelligence

Vril Dox, also known as Brainiac 2, is a fictional character published by American company DC Comics. He first appeared in Superman #167 (February 1964), and was created by Edmond Hamilton, Cary Bates, and Curt Swan.

== Publication history ==
Vril Dox is the heir of Brainiac, one of Superman's greatest foes, and an ancestor of Querl Dox / Brainiac 5 of the Legion of Super-Heroes. The character first appeared in Superman #167 (February 1964), by Edmond Hamilton, Cary Bates, and Curt Swan, in a story entitled "The Deadly Duo! - The Team of Luthor and Brainiac!". He was later resurrected in Invasion! #1 (January 1989), by Keith Giffen, Bill Mantlo, and Todd McFarlane, and reimagined as a clone of Brainiac.

He went on to star in L.E.G.I.O.N. '89 (February 1989) through L.E.G.I.O.N. '94 (September 1994) by Keith Giffen, Alan Grant, and Barry Kitson. He returned in the follow-up series R.E.B.E.L.S. '94 (October 1994) through R.E.B.E.L.S. '96 (March 1996) by Tom Peyer and Arnie Jorgensen, and the subsequent series R.E.B.E.L.S. (2009–2011).

== Fictional character biography ==
=== Silver Age ===
Vril Dox was a young Coluan who was adopted by the Computer Tyrants of Colu and declared Brainiac's son (Brainiac 2). He escaped and led a rebellion against the Computer Tyrants which overthrew their rule. He later appeared briefly in the Secrets of the Legion of Super-Heroes miniseries. His descendants (who had inherited long Coluan lifespans) were his son Pran Dox (Brainiac 3), his grandson Kajz Dox (Brainiac 4) and ultimately his great-grandson Querl Dox, Brainiac 5 of the Legion of Super Heroes.

=== Post-Crisis ===
==== Invasion! ====
Vril Dox II is a now a clone of Vril Dox (Brainiac), rather than his adopted son, as he is created by Vril Dox himself. He is still regarded as Brainiac's "heir", as he has inherited the original's high intelligence and Machiavellian ethics.

==== L.E.G.I.O.N. '89-94 ====
Vril Dox is the founder of the interplanetary police force Licensed Extra Governmental Interstellar Operatives Network (abbreviated as L.E.G.I.O.N., an acronym suggested by Strata but accepted by Dox). It was founded through outright murder when Vril and his allies destroyed a criminal drug ring. Chief Dox tries to manipulate everyone he came across, not generally accepting when they did not follow his plans. He manages to gain control of the bounty hunter Lobo. This is partly by outsmarting and outfighting Lobo and taking advantage of one of the bounty hunter's simple ethics; that he never breaks his word. The group also has fought the alien crime lord Maximillian G'odd and the mercenary Ice Man.

Vril leads the Earth's heroes in the 1992 Annual crossover, they travel to the Moon and defeat the Eclipso entity.

==== R.E.B.E.L.S. '94-96 ====
Vril had a son named Lyrl Dox (Brainiac 3) who rebelled and took over his organization. Vril later regains control of L.E.G.I.O.N by bartering with the demon Neron for the information on how to do it. The deal is for the soul of one of his unborn offspring. In addition, Vril asks Neron to have Ice Man not be a problem to them. After the cancellation of the title, he would only occasionally appear in the more cosmic DCU titles. For example, he appears in the 2004 Adam Strange miniseries, using robotic soldiers to hunt Strange. Dox, now missing his hair, incorrectly believes Rann had been destroyed at the hands of Strange. Dox's forces assist in the limited series Infinite Crisis.

==== R.E.B.E.L.S. (2009–2011) ====
A new 2009 series features Starro taking control of a now completely automated L.E.G.I.O.N. Dox, along with his old compatriot, Strata, must form a new team to regain his former status. In Blackest Night, Dox comes into contact with the mother of his son, who was killed by L.E.G.I.O.N. drones and resurrected as a Black Lantern. Dox was also in an area in which a Sinestro Corps member was murdered by another Black Lantern. When the ring started to search for a new host, it selected Dox, making him a member of the Sinestro Corps. However, not even the power of the ring was a match for the Black Lanterns, forcing Dox to teleport them to Starro's homeworld, despite the fact that his son, Lyrl (who had recently had his intelligence restored by the warlord) was there also. Soon after, the ring rejected Dox, who had repeatedly refused Sinestro's mandate that all members of the Sinestro Corps were to gather at Korugar, and declared that he had been discharged from the Corps.

R.E.B.E.L.S. helped to save the Vega system and several galaxies by defeating Starro the Conqueror. The plight of Rann's people was soon resolved by Vril Dox, seeking to restore his reputation after Starro the Conqueror stole L.E.G.I.O.N. from him and used it to enslave its client worlds. Dox Zeta-beamed Rann into the Vega system, in the orbit previously held by the now destroyed planet Tamaran, and proceeded to terraform Rann and make it suitable to sustain life again.

The restoration of the planet Rann was not Dox's only reason for relocating it into the Vega system. First, by putting Rann into Tamaran's orbit, it restored the gravitational balance to the Vega system, which had been thrown off by Tamaran's destruction. Secondly, in exchange for restoring their planet, the people of Rann agreed to let Dox rebuild L.E.G.I.O.N. headquarters on Rann.

Tamaranean refugees, led by Blackfire, attacked Rann believing that since the planet was in Tamaran's orbit they had claim to it. The violence was ended when Vril Dox, who was off-world at the start of the conflict, arrived with Thanagarian warships and stopped the fighting without bloodshed on either side. Dox was off-world negotiating an official end to the Rann–Thanagar War, using Rann's new-found distance from Thanagar and change in leadership on both sides as leverage.

Dox then went on to mediate the tension between the Rannians and the Tamaraneans by proposing that the Tamaraneans live on Rann's uninhabited southern continent.

Dox, Adam Strange and other senior commanders of L.E.G.I.O.N. also ensured peace with the Green Lantern Corps and helped create an alliance between Rannians, Tamaraneans and L.E.G.I.O.N. after defeating Starro, ensuring security for Rann, the Vega system and the galaxy, with Dox becoming consort to Blackfire.

=== The New 52 ===
In 2011, "The New 52" rebooted the DC universe. In Superman vol. 3 Annual #2, Vril Dox is shown to be Brainiac's original identity.

=== Rebirth ===
In 2016, DC Comics implemented another relaunch of its books called "DC Rebirth", which restored its continuity to a form much as it was prior to "The New 52".

== Other versions ==
An alternate future version of Vril Dox appears in Armageddon 2001.

== In other media ==
=== Television ===
Vril Dox appears in Harley Quinn, voiced by Jill Talley.

=== Film ===
Vril Dox appears in Legion of Super-Heroes, voiced by Benjamin Diskin. This version is a clone of Brainiac and member of the Dark Circle who was created to steal the Miracle Machine. After his failure to do so, Brainiac fuses him into himself, but Brainiac 5 later manipulates Vril and his fellow clones into fighting and killing one another from the inside.

=== Video games ===
- Vril Dox was set to appear as a playable character in Lobo prior to its cancellation.
- Vril Dox appears as a character summon in Scribblenauts Unmasked: A DC Comics Adventure.
- Vril Dox appears in Suicide Squad: Kill the Justice League, voiced by Jason Isaacs.

=== Miscellaneous ===
- Vril Dox appears in DC Universe Online: Legends #1.
- Vril Dox appears in the Arrowverse tie-in comic Adventures of Supergirl. This version is a hacker from the planet Yod. After being hired to frame Winn Schott for funding and aiding in terrorism, Vril disguises himself as an A.I. that Winn created called V.R.I.L. Vril discovers Supergirl's identity, but she finds and defeats him before he is arrested by the Department of Extranormal Operations (DEO).
