= DC Challenge =

Comic book series by DC Comics

- Cover of DC Challenge! #1 (Nov 1985), art by Jerry Ordway.

Publication information
- Publisher: DC Comics
- Schedule: Monthly
- Format: Limited series
- Publication date: November 1985 – October 1986
- No. of issues: 12

Creative team
- Written by: List: Mike W. Barr, Cary Bates, Gerry Conway, Mark Evanier, Paul Kupperberg, Paul Levitz, Elliot S. Maggin, Dan Mishkin, Doug Moench, Roy Thomas, Len Wein, Marv Wolfman
- Penciller: List: Ross Andru, Gene Colan, Denys Cowan, Dave Gibbons, Keith Giffen, Don Heck, Rick Hoberg, Carmine Infantino, Dan Jurgens, Gil Kane, Steve Lightle, Tom Mandrake, Luke McDonnell, Chuck Patton, Dan Spiegle, Joe Staton, Curt Swan, Stan Woch
- Inker: List: Terry Austin, Mike DeCarlo, Jan Duursema, Mark Farmer, Dick Giordano, Don Heck, Dave Hunt, Klaus Janson, Rick Magyar, Larry Mahlstedt, Tom Mandrake, Gary Martin, Frank McLaughlin, Steve Mitchell, Rodin Rodriguez, Bob Smith, Dan Spiegle, Arne Starr
- Letterer: John Costanza
- Colorist: Carl Gafford
- Editor: Robert Greenberger

DC Challenge was a 12-issue comic book limited series produced by DC Comics from November 1985 to October 1986, as a round robin experiment in narrative. The series' tagline was "Can You Solve It Before We Do?"

== Publication history ==
The DC Challenge series was conceived during a rooftop party at the 1983 San Diego Comic-Con. The premise of the series was that each chapter would be made by a different author and artist. No consultation between authors was permitted. Additionally, each chapter would end in a cliffhanger from which that chapter's author had to have planned a viable escape, and the name of the next chapter would be provided. Authors were free to use any DC character, with the exception of those whose appearances they were currently writing. Dick Giordano had been the original editor of the series, but turned the job over to Robert Greenberger before the first issue was published. The last issue of DC Challenge was a collaborative effort by six of the twelve writers.

== The issues ==
Issue	Date	Story title	Writers	Artists	Featured characters	Citations
1	November 1985	"Outbreak!"	Mark Evanier	Gene Colan and Bob Smith	Superman, Wonder Woman, Batman, Adam Strange, Riddler	
2	December 1985	"Blinded By the Light"	Len Wein	Chuck Patton and Mike DeCarlo	Superman, Batman, B'wana Beast, Jonah Hex, Congorilla	
3	January 1986	"Viking Vengeance"	Doug Moench	Carmine Infantino and Bob Smith	Superman, Hawkwoman, Jonah Hex, Batman, Aquaman, Adam Strange, Viking Prince, Hawkman, Alanna	
4	February 1986	"Atomic Nights"	Paul Levitz	Gil Kane and Klaus Janson	Martian Manhunter, Zatanna, Detective Chimp, Superman, Aquaman, Jimmy Olsen	
5	March 1986	"If There's a Hole in Reality, is Life a Cosmic Donut? or Thunderbolts and Lightning"	Mike W. Barr	Dave Gibbons and Mark Farmer	Adam Strange, Doctor Fate, Captain Comet, Captain Marvel, Uncle Sam, Blackhawks	
6	April 1986	"A Matter of Anti Matter"	Elliot S. Maggin	Dan Jurgens and Larry Mahlstedt	Silent Knight, Batman, Adam Strange, Deadman, Albert Einstein	
7	May 1986	"Don't Bogart That Grape ... Hand Me the Gas Pump!"	Paul Kupperberg	Joe Staton and Steve Mitchell	Mister Mxyzptlk, Plastic Man, Batman, Blackhawks, Woozy Winks	
8	June 1986	"If This Is Love, Why Do My Teeth Hurt?"	Gerry Conway	Rick Hoberg, Dick Giordano, and Arne Starr	Batman, Orion, Blackhawk, Enemy Ace, Lightray, Joker	
9	July 1986	"All This and World War, Too!"	Roy Thomas	Don Heck	Geo-Force, Metron, Son of Vulcan, Guardians of the Universe, Wonder Woman	
10	August 1986	"Jules Verne Was Right!"	Dan Mishkin	Curt Swan and Terry Austin	Deadman, Superman, Tomar-Re, Arisia Rrab, Vigilante, Adam Strange, Hawkman	
11	September 1986	"How Can You Be In Two Places At Once When You're Not Anywhere At All?"	Marv Wolfman and Cary Bates	Keith Giffen and Dave Hunt	Doctor Fate, Batman	
12	October 1986	"Prologue"	Mark Evanier	Dan Spiegle	Phantom Stranger, Bork, Mordorh, Darkseid, DeSaad, Adam Strange, Guardians of the Universe, Floyd Perkins, Superman, Kaz, Batman, Detective Chimp, Darwin Jones, Jimmy Olsen, Vigilante, Uncle Sam	
12	October 1986	"Phase 12.1: Fathers Against Suns"	Mark Evanier	Denys Cowan and Rodin Rodriguez	Superman, Manticore, Aquaman, Adam Strange, Mordorh, Anti-Matter Man, Joker, Orion, Lightray, Metron, Doctor Fate, Spectre	
12	October 1986	"Phase 12.2"	Dan Mishkin	Luke McDonnell and Rick Magyar	Batman, Joker, Kaz, Guardians of the Universe	
12	October 1986	"Phase 12.3"	Roy Thomas	Stan Woch and Jan Duursema	Viking Prince, Batman, Hawkman, Hawkwoman	
12	October 1986	"Phase 12.4"	Gerry Conway	Steve Lightle and Gary Martin	Wonder Woman, Woozy Winks, Deadman, Blackhawks, Metron	
12	October 1986	"Phase 12.5"	Len Wein	Ross Andru and Frank McLaughlin	Superman	
12	October 1986	"Phase 12.6 Final Phase"	Mark Evanier and Marv Wolfman	Tom Mandrake	Green Lantern, Flash, Superman, Batman, Elongated Man, Vixen, Hawkman, Wonder Woman, Vibe, Firestorm, Aquaman, Doctor Fate, Spectre, Eli Ellis, Darkseid, Martian Manhunter, Metron, Jimmy Olsen, Floyd Perkins, Perry White	

== See also ==
- The Kamandi Challenge
