= Chuck Patton =

American comics artist and animator (b. 1956)

- Born: Francis Chuck Patton; August 19, 1956 (age 70)
- Area: Penciller
- Notable works: Justice League of America
- Awards: Primetime Emmy Award for Outstanding Animated Program, 1999

Francis Chuck Patton (born August 19, 1956) is an American comics artist and animator. He is best known for his work on DC Comics' Justice League of America in the 1980s, specifically for the period in which the team relocated to Detroit and was staffed with new, multicultural super-heroes. With writer Gerry Conway, Patton created Gypsy and Vibe, as well as redesigning Vixen and Steel, The Indestructible Man.

== Career ==
=== Comics ===
A self-taught comics artist, although with a degree in art, Patton's influences included José Luis García-López, John Buscema, Gil Kane, Neal Adams, and Dick Giordano. Patton was interested in journalism, but was enticed into a comics career in large part thanks to Giordano, by then a top executive at DC. Patton entered the comics industry by penciling a brief run of Creeper back-up stories in The Flash #320–323 (April–July 1983).

After drawing various titles including Green Lantern, The Brave and the Bold, and the "Green Arrow" backup feature in Detective Comics, Patton became the artist of Justice League of America beginning with the August 1983 issue. During this period, Patton's roommate was fellow comics artist Shawn McManus. Patton drew issues #217–227 and 233–239 of JLA, a period in the title's history when it underwent great changes — including the core characters of Superman, Batman, and Wonder Woman leaving the team, and the introduction of the new multicultural lineup. These changes were not well received by readers, and Patton left the title feeling as if he bore the brunt of the fans' anger. In addition to Gypsy and Vibe, Patton also co-created the Cadre and Paragon.

After leaving Justice League, Patton was unsuccessful in gaining another regular penciling assignment. Instead, he worked on single issues or short runs of such DC titles as Action Comics Weekly, Blue Beetle, Legion of Super-Heroes, The New Teen Titans, Omega Men, The Outsiders, Secret Origins, and Vigilante. He was one of the contributors to the DC Challenge limited series in 1985.

During this period, Patton did sporadic work for Eclipse Comics and Marvel Comics, on such titles as New DNAgents, Daredevil, and Classic X-Men. He was considered to replace the outgoing Todd McFarlane on The Incredible Hulk, but turned the offer down when he was asked to emulate McFarlane's distinctive art style.

=== Animation ===
In 1988, after half a decade in the comics industry, Patton became disillusioned with comics and moved into children's television animation. He was living in Los Angeles by this time, which is where most animated series were produced. Patton's credits include Dinosaucers, G.I. Joe, Captain N: The Game Master, The Adventures of Super Mario Bros. 3, Inspector Gadget Saves Christmas, and Teen Titans.

Patton has become a successful animation director, helming such projects as Dead Space: Downfall, Teenage Mutant Ninja Turtles, and Spawn, for which Patton garnered an Emmy Award for Outstanding Animated Program.

== Awards ==
=== Emmy Award ===
- 1993 - Outstanding Animated Program (nomination) — Inspector Gadget Saves Christmas"
- 1999 - Outstanding Animated Program — Todd McFarlane's Spawn

== Bibliography ==
=== DC Comics ===
- Action Comics Weekly #613–618 (Nightwing) (1988)
- Batman #385 (1985)
- Blue Beetle #10 (1987)
- The Brave and the Bold #198 (Batman and Karate Kid) (1983)
- DC Challenge #2 (1985)
- Detective Comics #533–534 (Green Arrow backup stories) (1983–1984)
- The Flash #320–323 (Creeper backup stories) (1983)
- Green Lantern vol. 2 #163, 177 (1983–1984)
- Justice League of America #217–227, 233–239, Annual #2 (1983–1985)
- Justice League of America vol. 2 #7 (three pages) (2007)
- Legion of Super-Heroes vol. 3 #19 (1986)
- The New Teen Titans vol. 2 #15–16 (1985–1986)
- Omega Men #29–30, 36 (1985–1986)
- Outsiders Special #1 (1987)
- Secret Origins vol. 2 #12 (Challengers of the Unknown) (1987)
- Tales of the Teen Titans #56–58 (1985)
- Teen Titans Spotlight #13, 16 (1987)
- Vigilante #6–7, 31, 33, 35 (1984–1986)
- Who's Who: The Definitive Directory of the DC Universe #1, 3–5, 10–11, 14, 16, 18, 20, 22–23, 26 (1985–1987)
- Who's Who: Update '87 #4–5 (1987)

=== Eclipse Comics ===
- New DNAgents #4, 6, 11 (1985–1986)

=== Marvel Comics ===
- Classic X-Men #14–15 (1987)
- Daredevil #245 (1987)
- Marvel Super-Heroes vol. 2 #2 (Tigra) (1990)
- Official Handbook of the Marvel Universe Deluxe Edition #16 (1987)

Preceded by Don Heck	Justice League of America penciller 1983–1985	Succeeded by George Tuska
