= B'wana Beast =

- B'wana Beast's debut appearance in Showcase #66 (January 1967). Art by Mike Sekowsky and Joe Giella.

Publication information
- Publisher: DC Comics
- First appearance: As B'wana Beast: Showcase #66 (January 1967); As Shining Man: Animal Man #47 (May 1992)
- Created by: Bob Haney; Mike Sekowsky

In-story information
- Alter ego: Michael Payson Maxwell
- Team affiliations: Justice League
- Notable aliases: Jungle Master; White God; Shining Man
- Abilities: Telepathic control over animals; Able to fuse two animals into a chimera; Superhuman strength, speed, endurance, and agility; Heightened senses; Experienced wrestler

B'wana Beast (Michael Payson "Mike" Maxwell) is a superhero appearing in American comic books published by DC Comics. Introduced in Showcase #66 (January 1967), B'wana Beast is an African-themed hero with the ability to communicate with animals and fuse them together to form chimeric creatures. He gained this ability from a helmet he received after defeating the gorilla Djuba in Africa.

B'wana Beast has also appeared in various media outside comics. Kevin Michael Richardson and Peter Onorati voice the character in Batman: The Brave and the Bold and Justice League Unlimited respectively.

== Publication history ==
Created by Bob Haney and Mike Sekowsky, B'wana Beast made his first appearance in Showcase #66 (January 1967). The character was an attempt to capitalize on Edgar Rice Burroughs' Tarzan, borrowing the African jungle setting and "Tarzan yell" which was created in the Johnny Weissmuller incarnation of Tarzan.

== Fictional character biography ==
After graduating from college with highest honors, Michael Payson "Mike" Maxwell declines his millionaire father's offer to join the family business and instead decides to join his college roommate, Rupert Kenboya, in Africa and become a ranger in the Zambezi nation's new animal preserves.

When the private aircraft carrying Maxwell and Kenboya to Zambezi is struck by lightning and crashes at the top of Mount Kilimanjaro, the two take refuge in the cavern home of a mutant red gorilla. While drinking rainwater that had been filtered through the cavern's mineral-laden walls, Maxwell gains enhanced strength, allowing him to easily subdue the gorilla.

Acknowledging Maxwell as its master, the gorilla retrieves an ancient helmet from the depths of the cave and gives it to him. Through the helmet, Maxwell is able to read the red gorilla's mind and discovers that its name is Djuba. He also discovers that the helmet enables him to control all other animals. Agreeing that these new powers must be used for the good of all Africa, Maxwell creates the identity of "B'wana Beast".

In the initial story arc of Animal Man, B'wana Beast journeys to the United States to rescue Djuba, who has been captured by S.T.A.R. Labs scientists and infected with an experimental form of anthrax. He fails to save Djuba and is himself infected with the disease, but he is cured by Animal Man, who mimics B'wana Beast's powers to merge his white blood cells into forms capable of fighting off the disease. In Animal Man #13 (July 1989), Maxwell decides to retire and performs a ceremony to find a successor. He gives his helmet and elixir to South African activist Dominic Mndawe, who becomes Freedom Beast.

Mike Maxwell returns in Animal Man #47 (1992). After hearing the call of the destructive force called the Antagon, he is possessed by the entity and transformed into the evil Shining Man. As the Shining Man, Maxwell wreaks havoc on Earth until he is killed in a fight with Metaman.

B'wana Beast is resurrected following The New 52 continuity reboot. He is depicted as a rejected Justice League International applicant whose abilities are derived from the Red, a mystical force connecting animal life.

== Powers and abilities ==
B'wana Beast drinks an elixir that gives him superhuman strength, speed, hunting and tracking abilities. He also wears an ancient helmet that allows him to communicate with animals and merge them to form chimeras.

== In other media ==
=== Television ===
- B'wana Beast appears in The Superman/Aquaman Hour of Adventure. Additionally, the studio considered making a standalone B'wana Beast series, but it did not come to fruition.
- B'wana Beast appears in Justice League Unlimited, voiced by Peter Onorati. This version is a member of the Justice League who has a thick New York accent and blue collar personality. In the DVD commentary for the episode "This Little Piggy", it is stated that a seductive growl that B'wana Beast directs at Zatanna was provided by producer James Tucker as Onorati was unable to do so.
- B'wana Beast appears in Batman: The Brave and the Bold, voiced by Kevin Michael Richardson. This version is the love interest of Vixen and a former wrestler who gained his abilities from exposure to contaminated radioactive water. In the two-part episode "The Siege of Starro!", B'wana Beast sacrifices himself to destroy Starro. However, he returns in the series finale "Mitefall!" to attend the series' wrap party.
  - Additionally, an unnamed alternate universe incarnation of B'wana Beast makes a non-speaking appearance in a flashback in the episode "Deep Cover for Batman!" as a member of the Injustice Syndicate.
- B'wana Beast makes non-speaking appearances in Teen Titans Go!.
- B'wana Beast appears in the Legends of Tomorrow episode "Freakshow", portrayed by Jason William Day. This version is an unnamed strongman working for P. T. Barnum's traveling circus.

=== Film ===
B'wana Beast makes a cameo appearance in Teen Titans Go! To the Movies.

=== Video games ===
B'wana Beast appears as a character summon in Scribblenauts Unmasked: A DC Comics Adventure.

=== Miscellaneous ===
B'wana Beast appears in Justice League Unlimited #29.

=== Merchandise ===
- Four B'wana Beast action figures were produced by Mattel. The first was released as part of the company's Justice League Unlimited line as part of a six-figure boxed set along with Superman, Crimson Fox, Deadman, Commander Steel, and Vibe.
- Two figures of B'wana Beast from Batman: The Brave and the Bold were produced, one in the five-inch scale and another in a two-pack with Batman as part of the smaller Action League series.
- A six-inch scale DC Universe Classics figure of B'wana Beast was released in the "Justice in the Jungle" two-pack with Animal Man in December 2009 as a MattyCollector.com internet exclusive.
