= Stan Woch =

American comics artist (born 1959)

- Born: July 8, 1959 (age 67)
- Areas: Penciller, Inker
- Notable works: Batman: Shadow of the Bat; Robin vol. 4 The Sandman; Swamp Thing

Stan Woch (born July 8, 1959) is an American comics artist who has worked on comic strips and comic books.

== Career ==
After attending the Pratt Institute and The Kubert School, Stan Woch's early career included work as an assistant to Gray Morrow on the Barbara Cartland Romances and Buck Rogers comic strips. He then worked in the comic book industry as a penciller and inker. His first work for DC Comics was published in New Talent Showcase #1 (Jan. 1984).

His credits as a penciller include the 1980s Airboy series for Eclipse Comics as well as DC Comics' Swamp Thing and World's Finest Comics. He was one of the contributors to the DC Challenge limited series and he drew part of the "Fables & Reflections" collection of Neil Gaiman's The Sandman series. His credits as an inker include the Airboy series, Batman: Shadow of the Bat, Black Orchid, Doom Patrol, and the Robin continuing series. Woch's last new work in the comics industry was published in 1999.

== Awards and nominations ==
His work received a nomination for the 1986 Jack Kirby Award for Best Single Issue for Swamp Thing #43 with Alan Moore.

== Bibliography ==
=== DC Comics ===
- Batman and Robin Adventures #24 (inks over Bo Hampton) (1997)
- The Batman Chronicles #4 (inks over Frank Fosco), 13 (inks over Simon Coleby) (1996–1998)
- The Batman Chronicles Gallery #1 (one page) (1997)
- Batman: Gotham Adventures #14 (inks over Craig Rousseau) (1999)
- Batman: No Man's Land Secret Files #1 (1999)
- Batman: Poison Ivy #1 (inks over Brian Apthorp) (1997)
- Batman: Shadow of the Bat #53–54, 56–60 (inks over Dave Taylor), 61 (inks over Jim Aparo), 62–64 (inks over Dave Taylor), 66–67 (inks over Norm Breyfogle), 68 (inks over Jim Aparo), Annual #3–4 (inks over Brian Apthorp), #5 (inks over Stefano Raffaele) (1995–1997)
- Black Orchid vol. 2 #1–5 (inks over Jill Thompson), 7–16 (inks over Rebecca Guay), 18 (inks over Jamie Tolagson), 19–22 (inks over Rebecca Guay) (1993–1995)
- Catwoman vol. 2 #48 (inks over Jim Balent) (1997)
- DC Challenge #12 (1986)
- Detective Comics #565, 567 (Green Arrow, full art), 716 (inks over Jim Aparo) (1986–1997)
- Doom Patrol vol. 2 #51, 54–57, 59–62, 64–66 (inks over Richard Case)(1992–1993)
- Elvira's House of Mystery #3 (1986)
- Hellblazer #46–47 (inks over Will Simpson), 48 (inks over Mike Hoffman) (1991)
- Lobo #34 (inks over Frank Gomez) (1996)
- New Talent Showcase #1–4, 8, 13–14 (1984–1985)
- The New Teen Titans vol. 2 #12 (1985)
- Robin vol. 4 #18 (inks over Mike Parobeck), 19–22 (inks over Mike Wieringo), 23–24 (inks over Aaron Lopresti), 25–28 (inks over Mike Wieringo), 29–30 (inks over Frank Fosco), 31 (inks over Mike Wieringo) 50–54 (inks over Staz Johnson), 55 (inks over William Rosado) 56-64 (inks over Staz Johnson), 65 (inks over William Rosado) 66–67 (inks over Staz Johnson), 1,000,000 (inks over Staz Johnson) (1995–1999)
- The Saga of the Swamp Thing #38 (1985)
- The Sandman #29 (full art), 30 (inks over Bryan Talbot), 36 (inks over Shawn McManus) (1991–1992)
- Showcase '94 #10 (inks over Jason Armstrong) (1994)
- Showcase '95 #3 (Eradicator) (inks over Greg LaRocque) (1995)
- Showcase '96 #3 (Birds of Prey) (inks over Jennifer Graves) (1996)
- Steel #7 (inks) (1994)
- Superboy vol. 3 #10 (inks over Humberto Ramos), 14, 16 (inks over Tom Grummett), 35 (inks over Ramon Bernado), Annual #1 (inks over Greg Luzniak) (1994–1997)
- Supergirl Annual #1 (inks over Robert Teranishi) (1996)
- Superman Adventures #20 (inks over Neil Vokes) (1998)
- Superman Annual #6 (inks over Frank Fosco), 7 (inks over Chris Gossett) (1994–1995)
- Swamp Thing vol. 2 #38, 43, 45, 47, 49, Annual #3 (1985–1987)
- Talent Showcase #16–17 (1985)
- Teen Titans Spotlight #14 (Nightwing) (1987)
- Who's Who in the DC Universe #15 (1992)
- Who's Who in the DC Universe Update 1993 #2 (1993)
- Who's Who: The Definitive Directory of the DC Universe #18, 21 (1986)
- Wonder Woman #318 (inks over Mark Beachum), 319–320 (Huntress) (1984)
- World's Finest Comics #310–315 (1984–1985)

=== Eclipse Comics ===
- Airboy #3–10, 12–16, 33–37, 40–43 (full art); #45 (inks over Mark Johnson) (1986–1988)
- James Bond 007: Licence to Kill (1989)
- Miracleman: Apocrypha #1 (1991)
- ORBiT #1–3 (1990)
- Real War Stories #1 (1987)
- Tapping the Vein #4 (1990)
- Total Eclipse #5 (backup story) (1989)

=== Marvel Comics ===
- Darkhold: Pages from the Book of Sins #6 (inks over Richard Case) (1993)
- Official Handbook of the Marvel Universe Deluxe Edition #8, 10 (1986)
- Savage Sword of Conan #99 (1984)

Preceded by Mark Beachum	"Huntress" feature in Wonder Woman artist 1984	Succeeded by Rod Whigham
Preceded by Mark Texeira	World's Finest Comics penciller 1984–1985	Succeeded by Larry Stroman
Preceded by Richard Case	Doom Patrol vol. 2 inker 1992–1993	Succeeded by Graham Higgins
Preceded by Enrique Villagran	Robin vol. 4 inker 1995–1999	Succeeded by Wayne Faucher
Preceded by Josef Rubinstein	Batman: Shadow of the Bat inker 1996–1997	Succeeded by Wayne Faucher
