= Despero =

Comic book supervillain

- Despero as depicted in JLA/JSA: Virtue and Vice (February 2003). Art by Carlos Pacheco.

Publication information
- Publisher: DC Comics
- First appearance: Justice League of America #1 (Oct. 1960)
- Created by: Gardner Fox (writer); Mike Sekowsky (artist)

In-story information
- Species: Kalanorian
- Place of origin: Kalanor
- Team affiliations: Injustice League; Secret Society of Super Villains; Time Stealers
- Abilities: Superhuman strength, speed, stamina, durability, agility, and reflexes; Regeneration; Genius-level intellect; Telekinesis; Energy manipulation; Energy projection; Flight; Force field; Telepathy; Illusion casting; Mind control; Mind reading; Metamorphosis; Molecular reconstruction; Magic powers; Reality warping; Astral projection; Possession; Pyrokinesis; Biokinesis; Size alteration; Interstellar travel; Teleportation; Advanced hand-to-hand combatant; Expert strategist and tactician

Despero (/ˈdɛspəroʊ/) is a supervillain appearing in comic books published by DC Comics. The character first appeared in Justice League of America #1 (October 1960), and was created by Gardner Fox and Mike Sekowsky.

Debuting in the Silver Age of Comic Books, the character is a pink-skinned humanoid extraterrestrial with three eyes and psychic powers. Despero has appeared in both comic books and other DC Comics-related products such as animated television series and feature films, trading cards, and video games. He is an enemy of the Martian Manhunter, Booster Gold, the Green Lantern Corps, and the Justice League.

Despero has been adapted into various media outside comics. Keith David and Kevin Michael Richardson voice the character in Justice League and Batman: The Brave and the Bold respectively. Furthermore, Tony Curran portrays Despero in The Flash five-part episode "Armageddon".

In 2010, IGN named Despero the 96th-greatest comic book villain of all time.

== Publication history ==
Despero first appeared in Justice League of America #1 (October 1960) and writer Mike Conroy noted: "It was the first of several run-ins the would-be universe conqueror would have with the superteam".

Despero became a semi-regular villain and returned in Justice League of America #26 (March 1964), #133–134 (August–September 1976), and #177–178 (April–May 1980). The character made cameo appearances in Justice League of America #247–250 (February–May 1986) and then featured as the main villain in issues #251–254, dated June–September 1986.

Despero returned in an extensive story arc in Justice League America #37–40 (April–July 1990) and Justice League Europe #30–34 (September 1991–January 1992). The character's body reappeared as the host for L-Ron in Justice League Task Force #0 (October 1994), #13–33 (June 1994–March 1996), and #37 (August 1996) and Justice League International (vol. 2) #67–68 (August–September 1994). Despero reappeared in spirit form in Supergirl (vol. 4) #17–18 (January–February 1998) and Young Justice #6 (March 1999).

Despero eventually reappeared whole in the graphic novel JLA/JSA: Virtue and Vice (December 2002), and featured in the "Crisis of Conscience" storyline in JLA #115–119 (September– November 2005), Superman/Batman #33 (March 2007), and Trinity #4 (June 2008). Despero returned to a more human form in an alternate universe storyline in Booster Gold (vol. 2) #5 (February 2008) and #7–10 (April–August 2008).

The character returned in Justice League of America (vol. 2) #38 (December 2009) and featured in R.E.B.E.L.S. Vol. 2 #12–13 (March–April 2010).

== Fictional character biography ==
Despero first appears pursuing two rebels from the planet Kalanor, which he rules as a tyrant. The rebels make contact with the Justice League, with Justice League member Flash accepting Despero's challenge after he places the rest of the group in a hypnotic trance. However the Flash is defeated in a game similar to chess, leading Despero to transport the Justice League to another dimension. Despero found out about this by reading the mind of one of the rebels he had tracked down and teleported, though her father and Flash were protected by the dimensional traveller's 'blue glow'. The Justice League are able to escape all the dangers on the worlds and return to Earth using a dimensional traveler one of Despero's henchmen possesses after the Flash defeats him. Despero has found the rebel and plans to use the energy-absorbing weapon they hoped to use to disable his weapons to conquer Earth, but Snapper Carr uses it to weaken the villain after pretending he has been hypnotized, though the 'blue glow' protected him. Despero is imprisoned and Kalanor freed from his control.

Despero has his third eye surgically removed, making him lose his hypnotic powers. Eventually it grows back, he fakes his death in an explosion at a lab and in revenge ages half of the Justice League and banishes the remainder to three other worlds, where he has caused reptile, insect, and marine life to become intelligent, planning to conquer the worlds later. When Despero attempts to deceive Wonder Woman by disguising himself as an aged Superman, she overpowers the villain with her Lasso of Truth, realizing the energy should not have affected Superman, and forces him to undo his actions. Despero is thwarted again when the Justice League intervene in his intergalactic plans of conquest and save Martian Manhunter, who is being forced to play in a life and death chess match.

Despero is enhanced by the Flame of Py'tar, a remnant of the nuclear energy that created his race. After defeating the Justice League, Despero reshapes Gotham City to suit his purposes. Batman distracts Despero, allowing Vibe to extinguish the Flame. Despero's form is dispelled and reality restores itself.

Despero reforms his body and targets Justice League member Gypsy. After murdering Gypsy's parents, Despero is about to kill her when the Martian Manhunter intervenes. Despero quickly defeats the Manhunter, although fellow Justice League member Guy Gardner arrives and hurls Despero away. Despero attacks the League at their headquarters, and kills Steel. Martian Manhunter traps Despero in an illusory world, causing him to revert into a fetus. Despero is given to Manga Khan in exchange for his robot L-Ron.

A re-aged Despero is angered by this defeat and escapes from Khan, returning to Earth to battle the Justice League. Unknown to Despero, Khan hires Lobo to recapture him. Despero engages the Justice League, Justice League Europe, and Lobo in Times Square. A desperate Green Lantern Kilowog and L-Ron use Despero's collar to switch his mind with L-Ron's. While in L-Ron's body, Despero is destroyed, leaving L-Ron in control of Despero's body.

After being resurrected, Despero attempts to destroy Earth by using the alien substance Blackrock to influence Earth's alien heroes to turn against humanity by playing on their feelings of isolation. His efforts are foiled when Batman exposes himself to Blackrock while under attack by Superman. The sight of his friend's contamination helps Superman recognize what is happening to him, allowing him to confront the aliens and convince them that Despero deceived them.

=== The New 52 ===
In September 2011, DC Comics cancelled all of its monthly books and rebooted its continuity in an initiative called The New 52. In the series Justice League, Despero attacks the Watchtower and the Justice League until he is defeated by Martian Manhunter.

In the storyline Forever Evil, Despero appears as a member of the Secret Society of Super Villains.

In the Justice League Unlimited storyline "Escape from Powers Planet", Despero attacks Metamorpho, Green Lantern, and Mr. Terrific when they are sent to transport the Power Bank to Oa. The three instead crash land on the planet Dronnda, whose native creatures are inadvertently empowered by the Power Bank and gain the powers of the Justice League. Though briefly overwhelmed by the creatures, Despero places them under his control and attacks the group until he is fended off by Mr. Terrific, who uses the Power Bank to take the powers from the Dronndans and absorb them into himself.

== Powers and abilities ==
Despero is an alien from the planet Kalanor, and in addition to a genius intellect possesses a third eye on his forehead capable of psychic abilities such as mind control, illusions, telekinesis, and telepathy. Despero is empowered by the Flame of Py'tar, a mystical source of power that grants him immense physical abilities and the ability to alter his size.

== Other versions ==
A character based on Despero called Despair-the-Zero appears in Absolute Martian Manhunter. This version is an otherworldly consciousness who briefly inhabits FBI agent John Jones' body after a similar entity called the Martian leaves Jones.

== In other media ==
=== Television ===
- Despero appears in the Justice League episode "Hearts and Minds", voiced by Keith David. This version is an outcast who discovered the Flame of Py'tar, the life force of Kalanor, and built an army of followers empowered by it known as the Legion of the Third Eye. Martian Manhunter later frees the Flame, which restores Kalanor's environment and drags Despero underground.
- Despero appears in Batman: The Brave and the Bold, voiced by Kevin Michael Richardson. This version has eyes on his palms in addition to his third eye.
- Despero makes non-speaking appearances in Young Justice. This version is a gladiator who allows his majordomo L-Ron to speak for him.
- Despero appears in The Flash episode "Armageddon", portrayed by Tony Curran. This version wears a belt that enables him to time-travel and assume a human form. Additionally, he hails from a possible future where the Earth was destroyed by an Armageddon caused by a speedster. According to producer Eric Wallace, had The CW renewed the series for a tenth season, he had planned to make another crossover event featuring Despero bringing about an alien invasion and fighting Earth's heroes, such as the Flash.

=== Film ===
- Despero makes a non-speaking appearance in Superman/Batman: Public Enemies.
- Despero makes a non-speaking appearance in Green Lantern: Beware My Power.

=== Video games ===
- Despero appears in Justice League Task Force.
- Despero appears as a character summon in Scribblenauts Unmasked: A DC Comics Adventure.

=== Miscellaneous ===
- Despero appears in Justice League Unlimited #1.
- Despero makes a minor appearance in the Injustice: Gods Among Us prequel comic, in which he crash-lands on Earth while fleeing Sinestro, who eventually kills him.
