= Don Heck =

American comic-book artist (1929–1995)

- Heck in the 1960s
- Born: Donald L. Heck; January 2, 1929 New York City, U.S.
- Died: February 23, 1995 (aged 66) Centereach, New York, U.S.
- Area: Penciller
- Notable works: The Avengers; Iron Man; Ant-Man; The Flash

Donald "Don" L. Heck (January 2, 1929 – February 23, 1995) was an American comics artist best known for co-creating the Marvel Comics characters Iron Man, the Wasp, Black Widow, Hawkeye and Wonder Man and for his long run penciling the Marvel superhero-team series The Avengers during the 1960s Silver Age of comic books.

== Early life ==
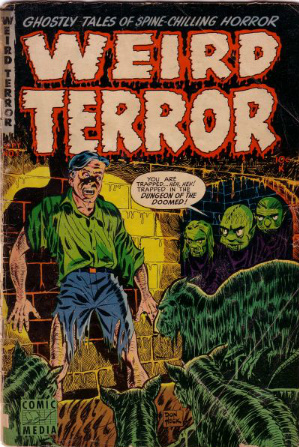
One of Heck's earliest known comics credits: Weird Terror #1 (Sept. 1952): Cover, plus the story "Hitler's Head".

Heck was born in the Jamaica neighborhood of Queens, New York City, the son of Bertha and John Heck, of German descent. After impressing his parents with sketches of Donald Duck, they enrolled him in art correspondence courses before he began studies at Woodrow Wilson Vocational High School in Jamaica, and at a community college in Brooklyn. He continued with an impromptu art education in December 1949, when at the recommendation of a college friend, he landed a job at Harvey Comics.

== Career ==
At Harvey Comics he repurposed newspaper comic strip Photostats into comic-book form – including the work of Heck's idol, famed cartoonist Milton Caniff.

Heck remained at Harvey, where one co-worker in the production department was future comics artist Pete Morisi, for two-and-a-half years. When a Harvey employee, Allen Hardy, broke off “to start his own line, Media Comics [sic; actually Comic Media], in 1952," Heck recalled in 1993, Hardy “called me up and asked me to join." Heck's first known comics work appeared in two Comic Media titles both cover-dated September 1952: the war comic War Fury #1, for which he penciled and inked the cover and the eight-page story "The Unconquered", by an unknown writer; and the cover and the six-page story "Hitler's Head", also by an unknown writer, in the horror comic Weird Terror #1. Heck's work continued to appear in those titles and in the horror anthology Horrific, for which he designed the logo; the adventure-drama anthology Danger; the Western anthology Death Valley; and other titles through the company's demise in late 1954.

Heck also did freelance assignments for Quality Comics, Hillman Comics, and Toby Press. For publisher U.S. Pictorial in 1955, he drew the one-shot Captain Gallant of the Foreign Legion, a TV tie-in comic based on the 1955–57 syndicated, live-action kids' show of that name.

=== Atlas Comics ===
Through his old Harvey Comics colleague Pete Morisi, Heck in 1954 met Marvel Comics’ Stan Lee, then editor-in-chief and art director of Marvel's 1950 predecessor, Atlas Comics. As Heck recalled

Pete Morisi, who worked at Media at the same time [I did], had been to Stan Lee's office, and he had brought his [art portfolio]. One of my stories was in there. and Stan kept going back to my story, saying, "This is the way you should have done it." Pete said. "Look, if you want Don Heck to come up here, he's looking for work, too. I'll tell him you're interested." Stan said, "Well, if he happened to walk up here, I might have a story for him." So I went up there on a Wednesday afternoon. Stan never saw anybody on Wednesdays, and he never saw anybody in the afternoon. But he came out. He looked at the first two pages and said, "Aw, hell, I know what your stuff looks like. Come on in. I got a story for you."

Heck became an Atlas staff artist on September 1, 1954; his first known work for the company was the five-page horror story "Werewolf Beware" in Mystery Tales #25 (Jan. 1955), though Heck in 1993 recalled, "The first job I did was about a whale breaking a ship apart. Then I did [the submarine-crew feature] 'Torpedo Taylor' for Navy Combat," drawing that five- or six-page feature in issues #1–14 and 16 (June 1955–Aug. 1957, Feb. 1958) and, oddly, doing one page of a five-page story finished by Joe Maneely in issue #19 (Aug. 1958). Until Atlas' 1957 business retrenchment – when it let go of most of its staff and freelancers and Heck spent a year drawing model airplane views for Berkeley Models – Heck contributed dozens of war comics stories and Westerns plus a smattering of jungle and science-fiction/fantasy tales.

Tales of Suspense #1 (Jan. 1959). Cover art by Heck.

Atlas began revamping in late 1958 with the arrival of artist Jack Kirby, a comics legend whose career was also in need of revamping, and who threw himself into the anthological science fiction, supernatural mystery, and giant-monster stories of what would become known as "pre-superhero Marvel." Heck returned alongside other soon-to-be-famous names of Marvel Comics' 1960s emergence as a pop culture phenomenon, making his first splash with the cover of Tales of Suspense #1 (Jan. 1959), one of the very few Atlas/Marvel covers of that time not drawn by Kirby. In the years immediately preceding the arrival of the Fantastic Four, Spider-Man, and the other popular heroes of Marvel's ascendancy, Heck gave atmospheric rendering to numerous science fiction / fantasy stories in that comic as well as in sister publications Strange Tales, Tales to Astonish, Strange Worlds, World of Fantasy, and Journey into Mystery. Heck also contributed to such Atlas/Marvel romance comics as Love Romances and My Own Romance.

Comics artist Jerry Ordway, describing this era of Heck's work, called the artist "truly under-appreciated ... His Atlas work (pre-Marvel) was terrific, with a clean sharp style, and an ink line that wouldn't quit."

=== Silver Age ===
During the period fans and historians call the Silver Age of Comic Books, Iron Man premiered in Tales of Suspense #39 (March 1963) as a collaboration among editor and story-plotter Lee, scriptwriter Larry Lieber, story-artist Heck, and Kirby, who provided the cover pencils and designed the first Iron Man armor. Kirby "designed the costume," Heck recalled, "because he was doing the cover. The covers were always done first. But I created the look of the characters, like Tony Stark and his secretary Pepper Potts." Comics historian and former Kirby assistant Mark Evanier, investigating claims of Kirby's involvement in the creation of both Iron Man and Daredevil, interviewed Kirby and Heck on the subject, years before their deaths, and concluded that Kirby

...definitely did not do full breakdowns as has been erroneously reported about ... the first 'Iron Man'. [In the early 1970s], Jack claimed to have laid out those stories, and I repeated his claim in print – though not before checking with Heck, who said, in effect, 'Oh, yeah. I remember that. Jack did the layouts'. We all later realized he was mistaken. ... Both also believed that Jack had contributed to the plots of those debut appearances – recollections that do not match those of Stan Lee. (Larry Lieber did the script for the first Iron Man story from a plot that Stan gave him.) Also, in both cases, Jack had already drawn the covers of those issues and done some amount of design work. He came up with the initial look of Iron Man's armor ...

Heck himself recalled in 1985 that while some sources claimed then "that Jack Kirby did breakdowns,"

...that's not true. I did it all. They just didn't bother to call me up and find out when they wrote up the credits. It doesn't really matter. Jack Kirby created the costume, and he did the cover for the issue. In fact the second costume, the red and yellow one, was designed by Steve Ditko. I found it easier than drawing that bulky old thing. The earlier design, the robot-looking one, was more Kirbyish.

Heck was the artist and co-creator of several new characters in the "Iron Man" feature. The Mandarin debuted in Tales of Suspense #50 (Feb. 1964) and would become one of Iron Man's major enemies. Hawkeye, Marvel's archer supreme, first appeared in Tales of Suspense #57 (Sept. 1964), following the introduction of femme fatale Communist spy and future superheroine and S.H.I.E.L.D. agent the Black Widow in #52 (April 1964). He drew the feature "Iron Man" through issue #46 (Oct. 1963), after which Spider-Man artist Steve Ditko introduced the familiar red-and-gold Iron Man armor and drew three issues. Heck returned with #50 and continued through #72 (Dec. 1965).

Concurrent with drawing Iron Man, Heck succeeded Jack Kirby as penciler on the superhero team series The Avengers with issue #9 (Oct. 1964), the introduction of Wonder Man. The Count Nefaria character was introduced by Lee and Heck four issues later. Heck, who inked his own pencils for many years, transitioned to the "Marvel method" of doing comics—in which the penciler plotted and paced the details of a story based on a synopsis or plot outline from the writer, who would afterward add dialog—and was assigned the help of an inker for the first time. He successfully made this adjustment, and went on to make The Avengers, which he drew through issue #40 (May 1967), plus the 1967 annual, one of his signature series. He inked his own pencil work in issues #32–37. Heck would return to The Avengers one final time to co-plot and pencil issue #45, with inks by Vince Colletta.

During this run, Heck co-created characters including the supervillain and eventual hero the Swordsman, in #19 (Aug. 1965); the supervillain Power Man, who years later became the hero Atlas, in #21 (Oct. 1965); the cosmic entity the Collector in #28 (May 1966); the supporting character Bill Foster, who much later became the superhero Black Goliath, in #32 (Sept. 1966); and the supervillain the Living Laser in #34 (Nov. 1966). During the next comics era, the Bronze Age, he co-created another cosmic entity, Mantis, in issue #112 (May 1973).

Elsewhere during the 1960s, Heck penciled The X-Men #38–42 (Nov. 1967 – March 1968) and introduced the new X-Men Lorna Dane in issue #49 (Oct. 1968) and Havok in #54 (March 1969). Heck drew, over John Romita layouts, The Amazing Spider-Man #57–64 and 66 (Feb.–Sept and Nov. 1968). Heck would also draw issues of Captain Marvel and Iron Man, the World War II war comic Captain Savage and his Battlefield Raiders, horror stories in Chamber of Darkness and Tower of Shadows, and, once more, love stories, in the romance comics Our Love Story and My Love.

From 1966 to 1971, Heck was an uncredited "ghost artist" on Lee Falk’s The Phantom daily newspaper comic strip, and later on the Terry and the Pirates daily strip.

=== Move to DC Comics ===
By 1970, however, Marvel work became less frequent, and Heck obtained assignments from rival DC Comics, beginning with a short story in the supernatural anthology House of Secrets #85 (May 1970). He did his first DC superhero work with The Flash #198 (June 1970), illustrating a backup story of the super-speedster, and eventually garnered additional work including romance comics, and the backup features "Batgirl" and "Jason Bard" in Detective Comics, and "Rose and the Thorn" in Superman's Girl Friend, Lois Lane. He began a short run on Wonder Woman with issue #204 (Feb. 1973), in which the character's powers and traditional costume were restored after several years, and he also freelanced for the short-lived publisher Skywald Comics.

Heck still occasionally worked at Marvel, penciling the odd issue of Daredevil, Sub-Mariner, Ghost Rider, The Avengers and others in the mid-1970s. He drew Giant-Size Avengers #4 which featured the wedding of the Vision and the Scarlet Witch. Writer Tony Isabella and Heck launched the new superhero team book The Champions in October 1975. But in 1977, he began working almost exclusively for DC. Heck explained in 1985, "I left Marvel for a change of pace. I kept getting all the new inkers. Everyone who walked in, I got them. A bad inker can kill artwork. I once got some pages back from inking and I just tore them up, that's how bad they were."

With writer Gerry Conway, Heck co-created the DC cyborg hero Steel, the Indestructible Man in the premiere issue (March 1978) of the titular comic. After that series' cancellation, Heck became regular artist on The Flash, and in 1982 reunited with Conway to draw the Justice League of America, including that year's crossover with the All-Star Squadron. Heck then returned to Wonder Woman and drew the title until its cancellation in 1986. Later that same year, he was one of the contributors to the DC Challenge limited series.

=== Later career ===
In the late 1980s and early 1990s, Heck returned to Marvel, where his work included features for the superhero anthologies Marvel Comics Presents and Marvel Fanfare. The artist even returned to two signature characters: he inked Hawkeye stories in Solo Avengers #17–20 and the subsequent Avengers Spotlight #21–22 (April–Sept. 1989) – both penciling and inking a second Hawkeye story in that last issue – and he drew Iron Man, inking penciler Mark Bright's eight-page "The Other Way Out" in Marvel Comics Presents #51 (June 1990), and both penciling and inking the one-page featurette "Tony Stark, The Invincible Iron Man" in Iron Man Annual #12 (Sept. 1991) and a pinup in Marvel Super-Heroes vol. 2 #13 (April 1993).

Heck also did a smattering of work for such independent comics as Topps Comics' NightGlider, Hero Comics' Mr. Fixit, Vortex's NASCAR Adventures, and Millennium Publications' H. P. Lovecraft's Cthulhu: The Whisperer in Darkness. His final DC work was penciling and inking over Joe Quesada's layouts for Spelljammer #11 (July 1991), and his last known comics work was the 10-page "The Theft of Thor's Hammer", by writer Bill Mantlo, in Marvel Super-Heroes vol. 2 #15 (Oct. 1993).

Marvel one-time editor-in-chief Roy Thomas said of the artist

Don was unlucky enough, I think, to be a non-superhero artist who, starting in the sixties, had to find his niche in a world dominated by superheroes. Fortunately, as he proved first with Iron Man and then with the Avengers, Don could rise to the occasion because he had real talent and a good grounding in the fundamentals. He amalgamated into his own style certain aspects of Jack Kirby's style, and carved out a place for himself as one of a handful of artists who were of real importance during the very early days of Marvel

== Death and legacy ==
Heck died of lung cancer in 1995. He was living in Suffolk County, New York, on Long Island, at the time of his death.

In 2026, Heck was selected for inclusion in the Eisner Hall of Fame.

== Bibliography ==
=== DC Comics ===
- Action Comics #517-520 (1981)
- Adventure Comics #424, 462-465, 482-484, 486-487 (1972-1981)
- Adventures of Ford Fairlane #1-2 (inks over Jose Delbo); #3-4 (inks over Carmine Infantino) (1990)
- Adventures of the Outsiders #38 (1986)
- All-Star Squadron #8-9, 65 (1982-1987)
- Batman #411-412 (inks over Dave Cockrum) (1987)
- Batman Family #8, 14, 16-17, 20 (1976-1978)
- Blue Beetle #23-24 (1988)
- Cancelled Comic Cavalcade #2 (1978)
- Centurions #1-4 (1987)
- Checkmate #4 (1988)
- DC Challenge #9 (1986)
- Dark Mansion of Forbidden Love #2-3 (1971-1972)
- DC Comics Presents #38 (full art); #94 (inks over Tom Mandrake) (1981-1986)
- Detective Comics #408-425, 427, 429, 431, 433, 481-482, 485-486, 489 (1971-1980)
- The Flash #198, 280-295 (1970-1981)
- Forbidden Tales of Dark Mansion #5 (1972)
- Ghosts #86 (1980)
- Girls' Love Stories #153, 177 (1970-1973)
- Green Lantern #120-122, 185 (1979-1985)
- Hawkman #1-6 (inks over Richard Howell); #17 (inks over Ed Hannigan) (1986-1987)
- Heart Throbs #96-97, 99-102, 104 (1965-1966)
- House of Mystery #192 (1971)
- House of Secrets #85, 89, 95 (1970-1972)
- Justice League International Quarterly #7 (1992)
- Justice League of America #187-188, 198-199, 201-205, 207-209, 213-216 (1981-1983)
- My Greatest Adventure #49 (1960)
- Our Army at War #36 (1955)
- Secret Hearts #101 (1965)
- Secret Origins #33 (1988)
- Sinister House of Secret Love #1 (1971)
- Spelljammer #11-12 (1991)
- Spiral Zone #3-4 (1988)
- Star Spangled War Stories #37 (1955)
- Steel, The Indestructible Man #1-5 (1978)
- Supergirl #2-4 (1973)
- Superman Family #187, 194-198 (1978-1979)
- Superman Movie Special #1 – Superman IV: The Quest for Peace (1987)
- Superman's Girl Friend, Lois Lane #123-130 (1972-1973)
- Teen Titans #50-52 (1977)
- Teen Titans Spotlight #17 (1987)
- The Unexpected #201 (1980)
- Weird War Tales #75, 81 (1971)
- The Witching Hour #6, 17, 20 (1970-1972)
- Wonder Woman #199, 204-206, 233-234, 287, 301, 306-309, 311-317, 319-329 (1972-1986)
- World's Finest Comics #246, 277 (1977-1981)
- Young love #40-42, 46-48, 87, 89, 101 (1963-1972)
- Young Romance #168 (1970)

=== Marvel Comics ===
- Amazing Adventures #5 (1961)
- Amazing Adventures vol. 2 #6-8 (1971)
- Amazing Spider-Man #57, 59-63, 66, Annual #3 (1966-1968)
- Avengers #9-15, 17-40, 45, 108-112, 145-146, 157, Annual #1-2 (full art); #119-120, 123 (inks over Bob Brown); #121 (inks over John Buscema); #301 (inks over Bob Hall) (1964-1989)
- Avengers Spotlight #22 (full art); #21-24, 27-28, 30-31, 33-34, 36 (inks over Al Milgrom) (1989-1990)
- Black Goliath #4 (inks over Rich Buckler) (1976)
- Captain America Annual #10 (1991)
- Captain Marvel #5-10, 16 (1968-1969)
- Captain Savage and his Leatherneck Raiders #12-16 (1969)
- Chamber of Chills #3, 13 (1973-1974)
- Chamber of Darkness #1-2, 8 (1969-1970)
- Champions #1-2, 5 (1975-1976)
- Daredevil #103-106, 118 (full art); #109, 119 (inks over Bob Brown) (1973-1975)
- Fear #29 (1975)
- Ghost Rider #2 (1967)
- Ghost Rider vol. 2 #22-25 (full art); #15 (inks over Bob Brown) (1975-1977)
- Giant-Size Avengers #4 (1975)
- Giant-Size Defenders #4-5 (1975)
- Giant-Size Dracula #3-4 (1974-1975)
- Giant-Size Spider-Man #2 (full art); (inks over Ross Andru) (1974)
- Invaders #35, 38 (1978-1979)
- Iron Man #26-31, 33-37 (1970-1971); Annual #12 (1991)
- Journey into Mystery #37, 44, 50, 53, 55-65, 67-68, 73-74, 76-77, 79-80, 82-86, 88, 98-100 (full art); #97-98, 104 (inks over Jack Kirby) (1956-1964)
- Jungle Tales #6-7 (1955); later becomes Jann of the Jungle #8-11, 14-17 (1955-1957)
- Ka-Zar #2-5, 11 (1974-1975)
- Kid Colt, Outlaw #99-100, 104-105, 135 (1961-1967)
- Marvel Comics Presents #12, 32, 40, 49, 51, 63 (full art); #51 (inks over M. D. Bright) (1989-1990)
- Marvel Fanfare #56 (1991)
- Marvel Feature #1 (1971)
- Marvel Premiere #29-30 (1976)
- Marvel Two in One #19 (inks over Sal Buscema) (1976)
- Mighty Thor Annual #4 (inks over Al Milgrom) (1989)
- My Love #14 (1970)
- Mystery Tales #25, 30 (1955)
- Mystic #46, 55 (1956-1957)
- Navy Combat #1-16, 19 (1955-1958)
- Nightstalkers #9 (inks over Mark S. Pacella) (1993)
- Our Love Story #3-4 (full art); #3 (inks over John Buscema) (1970)
- Psi-Force #22 (1988)
- Rawhide Kid #17, 20-22, 27, 30-31, 55 (1960-1966)
- Solo Avengers #17 (inks over Al Milgrom); #18-20 (inks over Ron Wilson) (1989)
- Spider-Man Magazine 2-3, 7-9 (1994)
- Strange Tales #67, 69, 71-83, 87-88, 90-92, 95-96, 98-101, 103, 105, 108, 140, 145-148 (1959-1966)
- Strange Worlds #1-2, 5 (1958-1959)
- Sub-Mariner #64-68 (1973-1974)
- Tales of Suspense #1, 3, 6-13, 15-19, 22, 24, 26, 29-36, 38-39, 42, 44-46, 50-72 (full art); #40, 43, 80 (inks over Jack Kirby); #47 (inks over Steve Ditko) (1959-1966)
- Tales to Astonish #2, 4-5, 7-17, 19, 21-25, 27, 30, 32-35, 37-39, 41-43, 45-48, 54 (full art); #44, 49 (inks over Jack Kirby); #53 (inks over Larry Lieber); #65 (inks over Bob Powell) (1959-1965)
- Thor #396-398, 400 (inks over Ron Frenz) (1988-1989)
- Tower of Shadows #2, 4, 9, Annual #1 (full art); #1 (inks over John Buscema) (1969-1971)
- Two-Gun Kid #45, 58 (1958-1961)
- X-Men #38-42, 44-49, 52, 54-55, 64 (full art); #37 (inks over Ross Andru) (1967-1970)

| Preceded by n/a | "Iron Man" feature in Tales of Suspense artist 1963–1965 | Succeeded by Gene Colan |
| Preceded by Jack Kirby | The Avengers penciller 1964–1967 | Succeeded by John Buscema |
| Preceded by Alex Saviuk | The Flash penciller 1979–1981 | Succeeded by Carmine Infantino |
| Preceded by George Pérez | Justice League of America penciller 1982–1983 | Succeeded by Chuck Patton |
| Preceded by Gene Colan | Wonder Woman penciller 1983–1986 | Succeeded by n/a |
