= Paragon (DC Comics) =

- Paragon from Superman #674, art by Renato Guedes.

Publication information
- Publisher: DC Comics
- First appearance: Justice League of America #224 (March 1984)
- Created by: Kurt Busiek (writer); Chuck Patton (artist)

In-story information
- Alter ego: Joel Cochin
- Species: Metahuman
- Abilities: Ability to duplicate any ability within his range

Paragon (Joel Cochin) is a supervillain published by DC Comics. He first appeared in Justice League of America #224 (March 1984), and was created by Kurt Busiek and Chuck Patton.

== Fictional character biography ==
Paragon from Justice League of America #224, artist Chuck Patton.

In his initial appearance, Paragon faced and defeated the Justice League of America by duplicating their unique abilities, but was defeated by the Red Tornado (an inorganic android) and Green Lantern (armed with his power ring), whose artificial powers Paragon could not duplicate. In his earliest appearance, Cochin's stated goal was the eradication of all those he considered "inferior"—more than three-quarters of the human race.

After his single appearance, Paragon went unseen for more than two decades of publication history. He later becomes a recurring opponent of Superman, although one who in certain circumstances was seen to help him.

== Powers and abilities ==
Paragon has the ability to duplicate the physical and mental abilities of organic beings in his vicinity and use them himself, even magnifying them by a considerable amount. In his original appearance, Paragon would lose someone's power as soon as they were out of his range. In later appearances, he prolongs the time he retains an ability using a high-tech suit of his own design.
