= Gypsy (comics) =

- Gypsy as depicted in JLA Classified #22 (July 2006). Art by Tom Derenick.

Publication information
- Publisher: DC Comics
- First appearance: Justice League of America Annual #2 (October 1984)
- Created by: Gerry Conway; Chuck Patton

In-story information
- Alter ego: Cynthia Reynolds
- Species: Metahuman
- Team affiliations: Birds of Prey; Justice League Detroit; The Conglomerate; Justice League Task Force; Justice League
- Abilities: Illusion casting; Precognition; Invisibility

Gypsy (Cynthia "Cindy" Reynolds) is a superheroine appearing in American comic books published by DC Comics. The character was originally introduced in Justice League of America Annual #2 (October 1984), and was created by Gerry Conway and Chuck Patton. Conway and Patton based the character's name and design on the Romani people (also known as gypsies). Despite her name, Gypsy is not depicted as Romani in-universe. In The New 52 reboot, Gypsy is the daughter of Quell Mordeth and originates from another dimension.

== Publication history ==
Gypsy was created by Gerry Conway and Chuck Patton, and first appeared in Justice League of America Annual #2 (October 1984).

In a 2018 interview, Patton discussed the character's creation, stating:

"Gypsy came about in the same way except we wanted a ninja-like character but more exotic, and some how the subject of gypsies came up. Being from Detroit, I've seen encounters with a few Romany people (aka gypsies), who came into our neighborhood up from the South, and they always carried a certain cultural mystique I thought would be interesting to portray other than the usual cliché. So I suggested her powers were camouflage stealth abilities and Gerry liked that and dubbed her Gypsy."

== Fictional character biography ==
Cynthia Reynolds is the daughter of Edward Reynolds and June Reynolds who live in a peaceful, suburban home. Cindy grows up as an intelligent and experienced barefooter, which becomes one of her trademarks as a teenager. Soon after Cindy's brother is born, Edward and June begin to fight. Cindy attempts to keep her parents together, but suffers abuse. When her illusion powers manifest at the age of fourteen, Cindy buys a one-way bus ticket to Detroit and runs away from home.

Once Cindy arrives in Detroit, she uses her powers to protect herself from the dangers of city life. As she grows to adulthood, Cindy adopts the identity of "Gypsy", patterning her dress after common stereotypes of Romani dress. The Justice League take up residence in a neighborhood near Gypsy's residence after Aquaman disbands the original League. After Gypsy assists the League in battling Overmaster, she is invited to join the group.

Gypsy's teammates Steel and Vibe are attacked by Professor Ivo's androids, with Steel being mortally wounded and Vibe killed. In a later story, it is revealed that Gypsy foresaw the two's deaths, but was unable to save them. Ivo sends an android to kill Gypsy as well, but she convinces it not to kill her, finding its conscience. Amazo makes sure that Gypsy safely returns to her parents.

Gypsy's domestic happiness is short-lived, as Despero kills her parents some time after she leaves the Justice League. Although devastated by the loss of her family, Gypsy agrees to join the Conglomerate, Booster Gold's corporate-sponsored super team.

Gypsy in battle armor, during her time serving in the Justice League Task Force.

During her time on the Justice League Task Force team, Gypsy grows close to Martian Manhunter. Gypsy and Martian Manhunter are both mainstays of the team and form a familial relationship. At one point, after she had been killed, Gypsy is resurrected by Martian Manhunter, who pleads with the Martian god H'ronmeer to restore her to life.

Gypsy later joins Barbara Gordon's Birds of Prey. She demonstrates greater flexibility with her powers, being able to extend invisibility to hide other people and things around her.

In The New 52 continuity reboot, Gypsy appears as one of several metahumans imprisoned by Amanda Waller. She is later revealed to be a refugee from another dimension and the daughter of Quell Mordeth. She had fled from Vibe's brother Armando Ramon, who was enslaved by Mordeth.

== Powers and abilities ==
Gypsy's primary power is that of illusion casting, which allows her to blend into her background, effectively becoming invisible. It also allows her to adapt to rapidly changing backgrounds without betraying the illusion. She can camouflage both herself and someone in close proximity to her. In Gypsy's first appearance, only her shadow is shown from the Bunker's monitor, and she appears to teleport at the end of the issue.

Gypsy's illusion-casting can also be used to project frightening illusions into the minds of other people. These illusions usually show what the affected person fears most. This ability can affect other living things besides people, and Gypsy can use this ability in combat situations. Gypsy has the ability to project an illusion to appear as another person, but that person needs to be her approximate height and weight for it to appear authentic.

Gypsy's powers have evolved to the point that she can now cloak not only herself, but a moving vehicle and its passengers. Gypsy also has limited precognitive abilities and astral projection.

Aside from her powers, Gypsy is an expert in hand-to-hand combat. She is also an acrobat, able to leap high, run fast, swim, and execute quick martial arts tactics with ease. Gypsy also has a strong aptitude in electronics and computers, and has become skilled in the use of firearms. She has been trained by Bronze Tiger.

== Other versions ==
An alternate universe version of Gypsy from Earth-16 appears in The Multiversity.

== In other media ==
=== Television ===
- Gypsy makes non-speaking appearances in Justice League Unlimited. This version is a member of the Justice League with the ability to turn intangible.
- A character based on Gypsy named Cynthia appears in The Flash, portrayed by Jessica Camacho. This version is a bounty hunter from Earth-19 who possesses similar powers to Vibe.

=== Film ===
A villainous, alternate universe incarnation of Gypsy named Gypsy Woman makes a non-speaking appearance in Justice League: Crisis on Two Earths as a member of the Crime Syndicate who can turn intangible.

=== Video games ===
Gypsy appears as a character summon in Scribblenauts Unmasked: A DC Comics Adventure.

=== Miscellaneous ===
Gypsy appears in issue #22 of the Justice League Unlimited tie-in comic.
