= Luke McDonnell =

American artist (born 1959)

- Born: July 19, 1959 (age 67)
- Area: Penciller
- Notable works: Iron Man; Justice League of America; Suicide Squad

Luke McDonnell (born July 19, 1959) is an American artist whose early career was spent specialising in comic books.

== Career ==
=== Comic books ===
Luke McDonnell began his career as a comics artist in 1980 and illustrated a wide variety of comics including long runs on Iron Man, The Phantom, and Suicide Squad. He made his Marvel Comics debut with the story "Eclipse of Reason" in Star Trek #12 (March 1981). In 1983, McDonnell and writer Dennis O'Neil began a storyline in which the character James Rhodes replaced Tony Stark in the role of Iron Man. McDonnell moved to DC Comics in 1985 and became the regular artist on Justice League of America with issue #245 (Dec. 1985). He drew the title through its final storyline (#258–261) which was written by J. M. DeMatteis.

McDonnell was one of the contributors to the DC Challenge limited series and then moved over to the Suicide Squad series written by John Ostrander. Suicide Squad #23 (Jan. 1989) written by Ostrander and Kim Yale and drawn by McDonnell, featured Barbara Gordon, the former Batgirl, making her debut as Oracle. The Ostrander, Yale, and McDonnell team produced a Deadshot limited series as well. In 1995, McDonnell drew the final two issues of an Argus limited series after which his comics work has appeared only occasionally.

=== Yoe! Studio ===
McDonnell mainly works as a toy designer and illustrator at Craig Yoe's Yoe! Studio.

== Bibliography ==
=== DC Comics ===
- Argus #5–6 (1995)
- Armageddon: Inferno #1–4 (1992)
- Atom Special #2 (1995)
- Batman: Legends of the Dark Knight #115 (1999)
- Captain Atom #45 (1990)
- DC Challenge #12 (1986)
- Deadshot #1–4 (1988–1989)
- Detective Comics #634 (1991)
- Eclipso #4–6 (1993)
- Green Lantern: Mosaic #14, 16–18 (1993)
- Hawkman vol. 3 #7–8, 12 (1994)
- Hawkworld Annual #3 (1992)
- Justice League of America #245–261 (1985–1987)
- Justice League of America #0 (2006)
- Outlaws #1–8 (1991–1992)
- The Phantom vol. 2 #1–13 (1989–1990)
- Secret Origins vol. 2 #11 (Hawkman), #14 (Suicide Squad) (1987)
- The Shadow Strikes! Annual #1 (1989)
- Suicide Squad #1–24, 35, 38–39, 44, 46, 49–51 (1987–1991)
- Weird War Tales #102 (1981)
- Who's Who in the DC Universe #1, 3, 9 (1990–1991)
- Who's Who: The Definitive Directory of the DC Universe #9, 11–12, 14, 18, 22, 25 (1985–1987)
- Who's Who: Update '87 #1, 3–5 (1987)
- Who's Who Update '88 #1, 3–4 (1988)

=== First Comics ===
- Crossroads #5 (Grimjack, Dreadstar, and Nexus) (1988)
- Dreadstar #33–40 (1987–1989)
- Nexus #68 (1990)

=== Marvel Comics ===
- The Amazing Spider-Man #219 (1981)
- Daredevil #202, 204 (1984)
- Defenders #146 (1985)
- The Further Adventures of Indiana Jones #12, 20 (1983–1984)
- Ghost Rider #63 (1981)
- Hercules #2–3 (1982)
- Impossible Man Summer Vacation Spectacular #1 (1990)
- Iron Man #151, 161, 163–187, 189–195, Annual #6–7 (1981–1985)
- Marvel Fanfare #5 (Captain America) (1982)
- Micronauts #46 (1982)
- Official Handbook of the Marvel Universe #1, 4–5, 12–14 (1983–1984)
- Official Handbook of the Marvel Universe Deluxe Edition #16 (1987)
- Savage Sword of Conan #86, 153, 177 (1983–1990)
- The Spectacular Spider-Man #55, 68, 105–106 (1981–1985)
- Star Trek #12, 14, 16 (1981)
- Star Wars #78 (1983)
- Team America #3–4, 7 (1982)
- Thor Annual #9 (1981)
- What If vol. 2 #18, 26, 44 (1990–1992)

=== YOE Studio! ===
- Big Boy Magazine #529–533 (2007–2008)

Preceded by Steve Ditko	Iron Man artist 1982–1985	Succeeded by Rich Buckler
Preceded by Joe Staton	Justice League of America artist 1985–1987	Succeeded by n/a
Preceded by n/a	Suicide Squad artist 1987–1991	Succeeded by Jim Fern
