= Vixen (character) =

DC Comics superheroine

- Vixen as depicted in Justice League of America: Vixen #1 (January 2017). Art by Ivan Reis.

Publication information
- Publisher: DC Comics
- First appearance: Action Comics #521 (July 1981)
- Created by: Gerry Conway; Bob Oksner

In-story information
- Alter ego: Mari Jiwe (birth name); Mari Jiwe McCabe (legal name)
- Species: Human (Godkin)
- Place of origin: Zambesi, Africa
- Team affiliations: Justice League; Birds of Prey; Suicide Squad; Justice Foundation; Global Guardians; The Network
- Partnerships: Bronze Tiger; Batwing (various); Anansi (patron)
- Abilities: Can mimic the abilities of any animals for various powers; Skilled hand to hand combatant; Successful businesswoman and model

Altered in-story information for adaptations to other media
- Alter ego: Amaya Jiwe (LoT)
- Partnerships: Green Lantern (John Stewart) (JLU)

Vixen is a superheroine appearing in American comic books published by DC Comics. Created by Gerry Conway and Bob Oksner, she first appeared in Action Comics #521 (July 1981), in a Superman story, working alongside the superhero to catch a poacher. An African superhero, she is considered one of the earliest created black superheroes in comics.

Hailing from the fictional African nation of Zambesi, Mari Jiwe (Mari McCabe after she emigrated to America) is the wielder of the Tantu Totem, a totem passed down in her family that allows her to take the attributes of any animal on Earth. Her role as a fashion model and a superheroine has made her operate in different cities, the main ones being Metropolis and New York. Having varied backgrounds over her publication history as a descendant of the warrior Tantu while connected to Anansi, the African trickster god who has been her family's patron for generations, the character serves as a fashion model, businesswoman, animal rights activist, and public superheroine affiliated with the Justice League, its derivative groups (Justice League Detroit and Justice League International), Birds of Prey, and Suicide Squad, at times taking a leadership position.

The character has been adapted in various DC Comics–related media, including the DCAU Justice League Unlimited and Injustice 2 as an alternate "skin" of Cheetah with her own lines while sharing a move-set. Two versions of the character appeared in The CW's Arrowverse. The Mari McCabe version debuted in the CW Seed animated series Vixen, voiced by Megalyn Echikunwoke, who also reprised her role in an episode of the live-action Arrowverse series, Arrow. Legends of Tomorrow introduced a World War II–era Vixen and Mari's grandmother, Amaya Jiwe, portrayed by Maisie Richardson-Sellers.

== Creation ==
In an interview, Conway discussed his reasoning for the character's creation:

...what I was trying to address was what I perceived to be a lack of strong female leads in DC's comics at the time. Or, let me put it this way: there was an opportunity, as DC was looking for additional books. Surveying the titles that they have, it seemed to me there were some obvious openings for characters that had been underrepresented. One of them had been lead female super-heroes. They had Wonder Woman. To a lesser degree they had Supergirl, Power Girl (who I also created), and Wonder Girl. There were a lot of girls, but not a lot of full-formed adult female super-heroes operating at DC, so I wanted to create one I also wanted to create a character who was a minority, and the idea of a female Black super-heroine hadn't been played up to any great extent at that point. I think Storm (of the X-Men) was around, but I don't think there were very many other representations of that type of character in the field... She was kind of based on what we called supermodels at the time. It was a very strange social phenomenon that was starting to occur back then. You had these women who were obviously objects of the male gaze, but they were also extremely empowered. They took charge of their own image, their own business, and identity. I wanted to show that. This was the 70s, so I hope female readers today will give us a bit of a pass on this. There were not that many active role models regarding careers for women at that time where you could reasonably say: this woman would have the resources to maintain a career as a super-heroine. What were the jobs available to women in the mid- to late-70s? Clerical work. Teaching jobs. There were very few potential jobs that would provide the potential resources and money that a character like Vixen would need to carry on a super-hero career. That's a horribly sexist reality we were dealing with. Plus, she's a minority, and that adds another whole layer of disadvantage that she has to overcome. So, it was a bit of wish fulfillment (for that character, not necessarily for me as the writer), and a bit of practicality to reflect something that was real in our society, i.e. the advent of these take-charge, supermodel/businesswomen.

== Publication history ==
Page from Cancelled Comic Cavalcade showing the intended cover to The Vixen #1. Art by Bob Oskner and Vince Colletta.

Vixen was intended to be the first African female DC superhero to star in her own series, but the first issue of her series was cancelled in the DC Implosion in 1978, never to be released. The story was subsequently printed in Cancelled Comic Cavalcade.

Since her debut in Action Comics, she has primarily appeared in team books, most notably various incarnations of the Justice League and Suicide Squad.

In October 2008, G. Willow Wilson began a five-issue limited series, Vixen: Return of the Lion.

== Fictional character biography ==
=== Background and early life ===
Centuries ago in Africa, the ancient warrior Tantu approached the Kwaku Anansi during an era where animals and men alike could commune and requested a totem that could channel the powers of the animal kingdom but could only be used for good. Gifting him the "Tantu Totem" (named after the warrior), Tantu became an African legend, noted as its first legendary heroes and his descendants would inherit the totem for generations, eventually settling in the Jiwe family.

Born and raised up in a small African village in Zambesi as the daughter of Reverend Richard Jiwe and Jeanne-Mari Jiwe, she learns the legend of the Tantu Totem from her father, who raised her as a single father following her mother's death at the hands of poachers and a man named Aku Kwei. Her father is soon killed by his half-brother and Mari's uncle, General Mustapha Maksai, while seeking to claim the Tantu Totem for his dark purposes and Mari fled to America subsequently as an orphan. Living in New York, Mari eventually becomes a successful and renown fashion model and international celebrity under the name "Mari McCabe".

=== Becoming Vixen ===
Mari eventually went back to Africa to reclaim the Tantu Totem and defeats General Maksai, eventually becoming the hero known as Vixen. Her earliest solo crime fighting adventures including fighting poachers in India and against the techno-psycho criminal, Admiral Cerebrus. Shortly into her crime fighting career, Aquaman disbanded the original Justice League of America and began a new iteration based in Detroit (informally known as Justice League Detroit) and she was accepted as for a full-time membership after applying. During Vixen's time with the team, the totem was taken from her by General Maksai, who still sought its power. The totem would only grant its full power to those who would use it to protect the innocent, and it caused Maksai to be transformed into a raging beast. Maksai died in battle with Vixen. When the team faced the killer android Amazo, Vixen and several of her teammates were beaten into unconsciousness and then left bound and gagged in a walled-off pit but Vixen saved herself and her teammates using her powers to shatter her bonds and dig to freedom. The team' was short-lived, however, as Steel and Vibe, were killed, leading to Martian Manhunter disbanding the team.

=== Suicide Squad ===
Vixen returned to modeling, but a Caribbean photo session turned violent; Mari's colleagues were killed by drug smugglers. She appealed to the government, who turned the matter over to the Suicide Squad. She went undercover to capture the drug kingpin Cujo, whose appearance had been revealed by footage from the photo shoot. Along with Captain Boomerang and Black Orchid, she destroyed the operation, but not before she lost control and killed the criminal kingpin. Revolted by what she had become, she agreed to work with the Squad until her animal instincts could be curbed. She worked with the Squad for some time, again seeing more teammates and friends killed. When it was disbanded for a year, Mari returned to modeling and even launched a successful line of clothing. Her failed romance with Ben Turner (the Bronze Tiger) made Vixen decline an offer to rejoin the Squad. She realized that Turner needed mental support, and she reluctantly returned. She ultimately gave up on a future with the Tiger, sensing that he would never admit to needing help, and left the team.

=== Other adventures ===
After the Suicide Squad's heyday, Mari continued to do undercover work. She was drafted for at least one mission for Checkmate (the Squad's brother organization). At some point, she assisted Oracle and the Birds of Prey. She went undercover to investigate a strange "superhero" cult, where the leader was using mind control and wound up brainwashed by him herself. Huntress tried to help her and was nearly killed. Vixen regained her senses by channeling the stubbornness of a mule to hold back the mind control of the cult leader. She and Huntress then rescued the other brainwashed heroes.

Vixen may still have had trouble controlling her animal side while using the totem, as witnessed when she worked alongside the Flash to stop Gorilla Grodd. She also served on one mission with the Justice League Task Force, helped Wonder Woman during a battle with Circe, and helped her former JLA comrades protect Lex Luthor. She then joined the loose-knit Ultramarine Corps. While part of the Corps, Mari was brainwashed by Gorilla Grodd who sent her and other heroes to battle the JLA. Ultimately, Vixen and the others were freed.

=== Infinite Crisis ===
After Sue Dibny is killed in the Identity Crisis miniseries, Vixen rejoined her Justice League colleagues. She was present when Firestorm died during a battle with the Shadow Thief. Vixen adopted a new uniform in Infinite Crisis #7, resembling her Justice League Unlimited counterpart.

=== One Year Later ===
Vixen was tricked into battle in Hub City by Solomon Grundy, who had gained increased intelligence following his resurrection. Using her totem, Grundy planned to merge his spirit with Amazo's body and thus gain further power. Without her totem, Vixen found that her innate connection to the "Red", the 'essence' of animal life', was falling apart. She managed to 'lock onto' the totem, but her mind became lost in a flock of migrating birds. After mimicking the abilities of a young boy, Vixen managed to regain her mind and quickly flew to New York to retrieve her totem. Vixen literally dropped into the JLA battle against Amazo. After the villains were subdued, Vixen became a charter member of the newly revamped Justice League of America.

=== Justice League of America ===
Vixen's main story arc in the early issues of Justice League of America Vol. 2, revolved around a change in her powers; Vixen changed from no longer drawing on animal characteristics, but to drawing on the powers of those around her. She matched others' skill levels and, as she suspected, drained powers from them. Superman was first to catch on to this and she subsequently revealed it to Red Arrow.

Vixen sought out her former Suicide Squad teammate Bronze Tiger to discuss her situation, and subsequently admitted everything to the League. Chairperson Black Canary instructed her to hand in her credentials and removed her from the team. Afterward, Dinah discussed with Mari the possibility of fixing the properties of the totem with the assistance of Zatanna.

When Zatanna attempted to find the source of the problem, she saw a mystic image of Vixen and Animal Man as puppets. When she tried to break the spell, she was repelled by an unknown force. When Vixen attempted to defeat the newly restored Amazo by absorbing all his stolen powers, she became mysteriously weak. She then fell unconscious, with Amazo bearing down on her.

When Zatanna and Red Tornado finally resolved the crisis, Vixen went to seek Animal Man, since he had been affected by similar power fluctuations, and was left unable to tap into the powers of Earth-borne animals. There, they were both sucked into the Tantu Totem, where, like in Zatanna's vision, they were trapped in Anansi's net. Anansi revealed his powers and how being the god of stories, he changed Buddy and Mari's personal histories and sources of powers to test them.

In an attempt to keep them contained, Anansi restored their connection to the Red, but altered the personal histories of the Leaguers, to prevent them from ever founding the JLA. However, Vixen escaped and sought the new Leaguers to fight Anansi at their side. Although she succeeded in gathering allies, they were still no match for Anansi's power. Vixen held a gun to her totem, even though she knew that if the totem was destroyed, they would all be destroyed. This forced Anansi to return things to normal. Anansi then revealed to Mari that the whole thing was actually a test. He explained that reality had been changed on a fundamental level, and he needed someone to act as his agent against an individual who could take advantage of the situation. He restored Mari's powers, returned her and the JLA to their homes, and said that he would one day call upon her.

=== Return of the Lion ===
Vixen: Return of the Lion is a limited series detailing Vixen's return to her home village for the first time. In that series, Vixen found that a local warlord named Aku Kwesi and his men had taken over several Zambesi villages. It turned out that this was the same man who killed Vixen's mother years ago. When Vixen confronted him, she found that he had powers that rivaled, and possibly surpassed, hers. These powers were based on advanced technology and chemicals that were given to him by Intergang lieutenant Whisper A'Daire. The rest of the Justice League of America went to Africa to render assistance, only to have several members get doused with Kwesi's Vodun zombie potion. This allowed A'Daire to take control of Superman and Black Canary and pit them against the rest of the League.

=== Final Crisis ===
During the Final Crisis crossover event, Vixen attends Martian Manhunter's funeral, and was later at the Hall of Justice when Empress, Sparx, and Más y Menos come there seeking help after being attacked by Mirror Master and Doctor Light. She later participates in a massive battle with Darkseid's forces after he nearly conquers Earth with the Anti-Life Equation.

=== After Final Crisis ===
In the aftermath of Final Crisis, the JLA was in tatters, with many of its members having to leave. Mari and the remaining team members enlisted the aid of Hardware after Kimiyo Hoshi went missing in her search for Shadow Thief and Starbreaker. With help from Superman's friend Icon, the team emerged victorious in the battle with Starbreaker, with Mari having bright hopes for the future of the team.

A short while later, Vixen broke her leg in a battle between the JLA and the dangerous villain Prometheus with Hawkman's mace. While she and the rest of the team tried to recover, they were ambushed by Despero, who sought to destroy the weakened League. The JLA eventually defeated Despero, only to be informed by Zatanna of the events of Blackest Night taking effect across the globe. After the Black Lanterns attacked, Vixen told Kimiyo that she was leaving the team to recover from her injuries.

According to writer James Robinson, Vixen was initially intended to have a significantly different exit from the team. According to him, issue #41 of Justice League of America was supposed to have Mari returning to Africa to help defend the continent in the wake of Freedom Beast's murder in Cry for Justice, eventually establishing a team of African superheroes known as the Justice League of Africa.

Despite no longer working with the League, Vixen was one of the heroes hunting down Maxwell Lord at the start of Justice League: Generation Lost, and was presumably mind-wiped by him along with most of the Earth's population. She and Black Canary later traveled to San Francisco to help Zatanna capture a group of humans who had been transformed into werehyenas.

Sometime after her resignation from the JLA, Vixen traveled to the rundown neighborhood of Liberty Hill to recruit Tattooed Man for a new team of heroes she is putting together. However, Vixen discovered that a group of gang bangers who had formerly worked under Tattooed Man had taken control of the community and made a fortune for themselves through crime. Mistakenly believing that Tattooed Man was responsible for the acts of violence committed by his former thugs, Vixen rescinded her offer and attacked him. After a brutal fight, Vixen willingly surrendered and agreed to leave and let Tattooed Man take care of his neighborhood in his own way.

=== The New 52 ===
In The New 52 (a 2011 reboot of the DC Comics universe), Vixen was recruited as part of the new Justice League International. Her tenure with the team proved short, since she was injured in an explosion and rendered comatose. Her old friend David Zavimbe later joined the team in her honor as Batwing.

After the JLI disbanded, Vixen was seen as one of Cyborg's new recruits for the main Justice League roster.

=== DC Rebirth ===
Vixen is recruited by Batman to join his new Justice League of America. Vixen is later seen working on behalf of the League, investigating a lead on a mysterious technology threatening America.

At the 2026 San-Diego Comic-Con, it was announced that the character would receive her first ongoing series, to be written by Stephanie Williams and illustrated by Khary Randolph.

== Characterization ==
=== Description ===
The character's personality has been described as being a compassionate individual with a strong moral compass, although she can be both short-tempered and overtly self-righteous. Vixen is also noted to simultaneously be a model and animal-rights activist, both roles allowing her to protect those (human and animals) incapable of protecting themselves. During her time in the Suicide Squad, the character's control over her power had caused her to become a killer and agreed to work with the team until she can better control her powers. Vixen has also served in leadership positions, having acted as Batman's lieutenant when he led the Justice League of America before she converted it into the Justice Foundation.

Vixen's lineage has been revised over time; Tantu's lineage was originally paternal and extended from her father, Richard Jiwe. In DC Rebirth, Tantu's line is instead connected to her maternal line, with her mother being the last wielder of the Tantu Totem prior. While possessing inherent super-powers, the character has stated she is not metahuman (possessing a meta-gene); instead, another story revealed Vixen to be a godkin connected to Anansi's bloodline.

=== Love interest and sexuality ===
Throughout her publication history, the character has had several love interests; in comics, Bronze Tiger is her most recurring romantic partner beginning during their time in the Suicide Squad when she aided in his rehabilitation from brainwashing by the League of Assassins. She eventually ends the relationship when Turners' doubts in rehabilitation became too overwhelming, believing Turner needed to accept help but unaware Sarge Steel's racially motivated manipulations was the primary catalyst. Despite this, the characters are on amicable terms as Tuner serves as a close confidante and friend she still has feelings for.

Outside mainstream comic continuities, the character has been paired with women; most prominently, Bombshells' version is depicted in a relationship with Hawkgirl; inspired by their role as dueling love interests of John Stewart in the Justice League Unlimited, Mari is the Queen of Zambesi and Shiera is an archaeologist and mechanic whom meets Mari while investigating the legend of the Tantu Totem and the pairs' attraction leads them to fall in love. In the comic tie-in to the Harley Quinn animated series, the character is expressed to be bisexual and paired with Elle, whom is lesbian.

== Powers and abilities ==
The Tantu Totem is a totem that has a connection to Earth's morphogenetic field (also called the Red), giving the wearer the attributes and abilities of a select animal at will. The totem was first created by the African god of trickery, Anansi, who gifted it to Tantu to aid in his quest to protect mankind from evil and became the first, legendary African hero. The totem passed through his family lineage generations. Eventually passed down to Vixen; initially the source of her powers, it is retroactively revealed that Vixen is a descendant of Anansi, known as a godkin. The totem amplifies her inherent powers to abilities of animals she is familiar with, able to be done one at a time. Without it, she retains the powers at a reduced level.

In addition to her powers, Vixen is an accomplished hand-to-hand combatant, trained by the Justice League. She a preference for stealth, aided by her powers. She has knowledge of techniques used by Bronze Tiger. She is also a successful businesswoman whose intelligence allows her international success, supporting her outside crime-fighting.

== Other versions ==
- An alternate universe version of Vixen appears in Flashpoint. This version is a member of Wonder Woman's Furies and former lover of Oliver Queen.
- An alternate universe version of Vixen appears in DC Comics Bombshells. This version is a lesbian, lover of Hawkgirl, and ally of the eponymous group.

== In other media ==
=== Television ===
Vixen as she appears in Justice League Unlimited (left) and Batman: The Brave and the Bold (right).
- An unrelated character called Vixen appears in Lois & Clark: The New Adventures of Superman, portrayed by Lori Fetrick.
- Vixen appears in Justice League Unlimited, voiced by Gina Torres. This version is a member of the Justice League and in a relationship with Green Lantern.
- Vixen appears in Batman: The Brave and the Bold, voiced by Cree Summer. This version is in a relationship with B'wana Beast.
- Vixen makes non-speaking cameo appearances in Teen Titans Go!.
- Vixen appears in Justice League Action, voiced by Jasika Nicole. This version is a member of the Justice League.

=== Arrowverse ===
Megalyn Echikunwoke as Mari McCabe as depicted in Arrow (left) and Maisie Richardson-Sellers as Amaya Jiwe as depicted in Legends of Tomorrow (right).

Characters inspired by Vixen appear in series set in the Arrowverse.

- Mari McCabe / Vixen appears in an animated self-titled web series, voiced by Megalyn Echikunwoke as an adult and Kimberly Brooks as her younger self. This version hails from Detroit, Michigan.
  - Mari also appears in the live-action TV series Arrow episode "Taken", portrayed by Echikunwoke. By this time, she has become an experienced vigilante with extensive knowledge of mysticism, which she uses to assist Oliver Queen and his team in fighting Damien Darhk.
  - Mari also appears in the second season of the animated web series Freedom Fighters: The Ray, voiced again by Echikunwoke.
- Mari's grandmother and previous holder of the Vixen mantle, Amaya Jiwe, appears as a series regular in the second and third seasons of the live-action TV series Legends of Tomorrow, portrayed by Maisie Richardson-Sellers. Initially a member of the Justice Society of America, she was in a relationship with team leader Hourman before he is killed by the Reverse-Flash, resulting in her joining the Legends to avenge him. Throughout her time with the Legends, she enters a new relationship with teammate Nate Heywood, defeats the Reverse-Flash and the Legion of Doom, forms a bond with Zari Tomaz due to their use of Zambezi totems, clashes with her granddaughter and McCabe's sister Kuasa, and joins forces with her future daughter Esi to save their village from being destroyed in 1992. As a result of Jiwe's changes to the timeline, Mari and Kuasa share the Tantu Totem. By the end of the third season, Jiwe returns to her village in 1942.

=== Film ===
- A villainous, alternate universe incarnation of Vixen named Vamp makes a non-speaking appearance in Justice League: Crisis on Two Earths as a minor member of the Crime Syndicate who can shapeshift into animals.
- Vixen appears in films set in the Tomorrowverse, voiced by Keesha Sharp.
  - Vixen appears in Green Lantern: Beware My Power.
  - Vixen appears in Justice League: Crisis on Infinite Earths.
- Vixen appears in Justice League x RWBY: Super Heroes & Huntsmen, voiced by Ozioma Akagha. This version is a member of the Justice League.

=== Video games ===
- Vixen appears in DC Universe Online.
- Vixen appears as a playable character in Lego Batman 2: DC Super Heroes.
- Vixen appears as a character summon in Scribblenauts Unmasked: A DC Comics Adventure.
- Vixen appears as a playable character in Lego Batman 3: Beyond Gotham via DLC.
- Vixen appears as a "premier skin" for the Cheetah in Injustice 2, voiced again by Megalyn Echikunwoke.
- Vixen appears as a playable character in Lego DC Super-Villains, voiced again by Megalyn Echikunwoke.

=== Miscellaneous ===
- The Justice League Unlimited incarnation of Vixen appears in a flashback in Justice League Beyond #7, in which she is killed by the Shadow Thief on the night that Green Lantern planned to propose to her in Paris.
- Vixen appears in DC Super Hero Girls, voiced again by Kimberly Brooks. This version volunteers at the Metropolis Zoo.
- Vixen appears in the Injustice 2 prequel comic as an associate of Animal Man who initially supports Ra's al Ghul and the League of Assassins until Damian Wayne convinces her otherwise.
- Vixen appears in the Harley Quinn tie-in comic Harley Quinn: The Animated Series: The Eat. Bang! Kill Tour, in which she initially clashes with before eventually befriending Harley Quinn and Poison Ivy.
- Vixen appears in the webcomic Vixen: NYC, written by Jasmine Walls and with Manou Azumi as the lead artist.

== See also ==
- African characters in comics
