= Vibe (character) =

Fictional superhero from DC Comics

- Vibe as depicted in Who's Who in the DC Universe #5 (December 1987). Art by Luke McDonnell.

Publication information
- Publisher: DC Comics
- First appearance: Justice League of America Annual #2 (October 1984)
- Created by: Gerry Conway (writer), Chuck Patton (artist)

In-story information
- Alter ego: Francisco Paco "Cisco" Ramon (post-New 52); Paco Ramone (pre-New 52)
- Species: Metahuman
- Place of origin: Earth
- Team affiliations: Justice League Detroit; Los Lobos; Justice League; Black Lantern Corps; Justice League United
- Abilities: Above average agility; Skilled hand to hand combatant; Sonic vibration manipulation; Seismic powers; (New 52): Molecular vibration; Induced image distortion
Justice League of America's Vibe
Publication information
- Schedule: Monthly
- Format: Ongoing
- Genre: Superhero
- Publication date: February 2013 – December 2013
- No. of issues: 10 (as of February 2014 cover date)
Creative team
- Written by: Andrew Kreisberg, Geoff Johns, Sterling Gates
- Artist(s): Pete Woods, Sean Parsons

Vibe (Francisco Paco "Cisco" Ramon) is a fictional superhero appearing in American comic books published by DC Comics.

He has the metahuman ability to emit powerful vibratory shock waves. Introduced in 1984 as Paco Ramone, he joined the new Justice League formed in Detroit and became the first member to be killed in action. In The New 52 continuity reboot, his powers were redefined to involve interdimensional physics, posing a significant threat to characters like the Flash.

Carlos Valdes portrays Cisco Ramon / Vibe in The CW's Arrowverse, where he develops from a supporting engineer to a superhero. Vibe also makes lesser appearances in the animated series Justice League Unlimited and a self-titled episode of DC Nation Shorts.

== Publication history ==
Vibe first appeared in Justice League of America Annual #2 (October 1984), and was created by Gerry Conway and Chuck Patton.

In a 2018 interview, Patton discussed the character's creation, stating:

"We threw ideas back and forth, but the most important one that stuck out for me was Gerry really wanted to tap into breakdancing, BIG TIME, lol. And all joking aside, he wasn't wrong, the time was right, break dancing was all over the media, from music to movies and television. I wanted whomever we came up with to have a strong, urban ethnic, "Down to Earth" feel that would reflect my own background.

However, Gerry's inspiration was definitely more 'West Coast' oriented, so he, tapped into the spirit of the movie Electric Boogaloo and our first hero came from out of the gang element of '80s LA.

I went along to get along, because I really disliked that movie and was unsure about the West Side Story gang influence, lol. But I did like the potential, so I suggested that his powers would be from what all Angelenos feared most out here—earthquakes. We later changed them into super-vibrational waves he would project thru his dance moves, hence the name 'Vibe'."

Vibe was one of the first US Latino superheroes, and possibly the first Mexican-American superhero (if the character is Mexican-American, which is implied but not made explicit). However, the character has been described as stereotypical, and comics artist George Pérez, who was of Puerto Rican descent, refused to draw him in his entirety. As the "Justice League Detroit" series developed, team members noticed that at times he sounded like a Cheech and Chong character and other times he had almost no accent at all, deducing that this was done just for appearance's sake.

In DC's Free Comic Book Day 2012 sample during The New 52, a gatefold revealed various characters who would appear in Justice League over the coming year, one of which was Vibe. Geoff Johns revealed that Vibe's return would be explored in greater detail in the third story arc of Justice League. On August 26, 2012, DC announced a new Justice League of America title which would feature Vibe. On November 5, 2012, DC announced that Vibe would star in his own ongoing title. Debuting in February 2013, the series was written by Andrew Kreisberg and drawn by Pete Woods. Justice League of America's Vibe lasted for ten issues, with the final issue released on December 18, 2013.

== Fictional character biography ==
Paco Ramon began his career as Vibe shortly after Aquaman disbanded the original Justice League. When Paco heard that a new version of the Justice League was forming in his own hometown Detroit, he decided to give up his position as the leader of a local street gang, Los Lobos, to join. What made Paco a candidate was his metahuman ability to emit powerful vibratory shock waves.

Vibe's presence on the team causes Aquaman and Martian Manhunter to harbor some strong doubts about the new Justice League, particularly after he gets the League involved in a rumble with a rival gang and his older brother Armando. Vibe soon proves his mettle during the League's battles against the Cadre, Anton Allegro, and Amazo. He stays with the League through the Crisis on Infinite Earths crossover, when his powers play a vital role in defeating Despero.

During the 1987 event Legends, the Justice League disbands and Paco leaves to seek the familiar solace of the streets. He is attacked and killed by one of Professor Ivo's androids, becoming the first Justice League member to be killed in the line of duty. Martian Manhunter brings Vibe's body to the League's mountain sanctuary, where he is laid to rest in a cryogenic chamber.

In the 2008 series Trinity, Vibe is resurrected after Despero, Morgaine le Fey, and Enigma replace Superman, Batman, and Wonder Woman as the core of the DC universe and alter reality. Soon after the real trinity returns, Vibe is disintegrated by an energy blast. In the 2009 event Blackest Night, Vibe is resurrected as a member of the Black Lantern Corps, rising from his coffin in the Hall of Justice. Alongside the Black Lantern Steel, Vibe attacks his former teammates, Gypsy and Vixen, until Doctor Light destroys him.

=== The New 52 ===
In The New 52 continuity, Vibe gained his powers after being caught in the event horizon of a Boom Tube, a type of portal used by the New Gods, while juggling a personal life with his younger brother Dante.

== Powers and abilities ==
As his name suggests, Vibe's powers revolve around vibration, frequency, and resonance. His powers enable him to create shock waves of considerable strength that could shatter concrete or steel as well as affect the physical world as seismic vibrations (and even earth manipulation) or the fabric of space-time (interdimensional, transdimensional and extradimensional portals).

Vibe's reintroduction in 2013 redefined his powers as involving interdimensional physics. Vibe's waves have the power to disrupt the Speed Force, making him one of the few characters who poses a serious threat to the Flash. For this reason, Steve Trevor recruits him into the JLA which exists to guard against the threat of the main Justice League going rogue. Amanda Waller stated that "Cisco Ramon might be one of the most powerful super-humans on the planet. He wields vibrational powers that could in theory shake the Earth apart. And he's the only person we know of who can find and track inter-dimensional breaches." He is also undetectable by security cameras.

== In other media ==
=== Television ===
- Vibe makes non-speaking appearances in Justice League Unlimited as a member of the Justice League.
- Vibe appears in the DC Nation Shorts two-part short "Enter: Extremo", voiced by Carlos Alazraqui.
- Vibe appears in Teen Titans Go!, voiced by Peter Rida Michail.
- Cisco Ramon appears in Young Justice, voiced by Jacob Vargas. This version is a high school student at Hayward High School and classmate of Victor Stone.
- Vibe makes a non-speaking cameo appearance in the Harley Quinn episode "Something Borrowed, Something Green" as a member of the Justice League.
- Vibe makes cameo appearances in DC Super Hero Girls as a student of Super Hero High.

==== Arrowverse ====
Carlos Valdes as Cisco Ramon / Vibe as he appears in the CW series The Flash.

Cisco Ramon / Vibe appears in media set in the Arrowverse, portrayed by Carlos Valdes.

- First appearing in the Arrow episode "The Man Under the Hood" and primarily appearing in The Flash, this version is a mechanical engineer at S.T.A.R. Labs in Central City who assists Barry Allen / Flash in his crime-fighting efforts alongside Caitlin Snow. Following the explosion of Harrison Wells' particle accelerator, Ramon suffers a delayed reaction and eventually becomes a metahuman with sonic manipulation capabilities, tactile remote viewing, and the ability to detect anomalies within reality. As the series progresses, he hones his powers, developing the ability to create portals, and becomes Vibe. Additionally, he's the Earth-1 doppelganger of Earth-2's Reverb and Earth-19's Echo.
- Ramon also appears in Legends of Tomorrow, Supergirl, Vixen, and the web series Chronicles of Cisco: Entry 0419.
- Ramon and his Earth-X doppelganger appear in the web series Freedom Fighters: The Ray.

=== Film ===
- A villainous, alternate universe incarnation of Vibe named Breakdance appears in Justice League: Crisis on Two Earths, voiced by Carlos Alazraqui. He is a member of the Crime Syndicate serving under Owlman.
- Vibe makes a cameo appearance in Superman via a mural at the Hall of Justice.

=== Video games ===
- Vibe appears as a character summon in Scribblenauts Unmasked: A DC Comics Adventure.
- Vibe appears as a playable character in Lego Batman 3: Beyond Gotham, voiced by Dee Bradley Baker.
- The Arrowverse incarnation of Vibe appears as a playable character in Lego DC Super-Villains as part of the "DC TV Super-Heroes" DLC pack.
