= Gerry Conway =

American comic book writer (1952–2026)

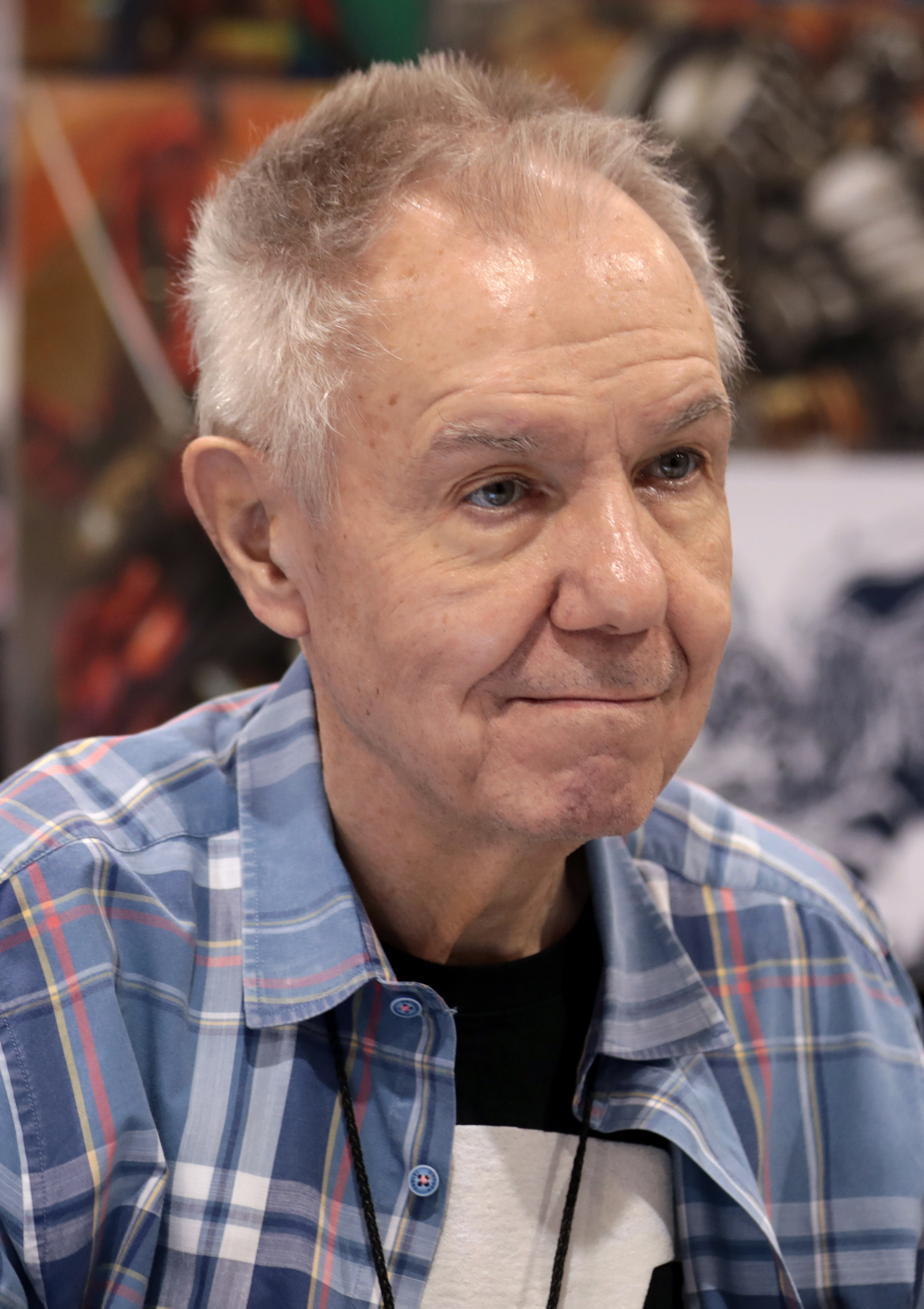
- Conway at the 2019 Phoenix Fan Fusion
- Born: Gerard Francis Conway; September 10, 1952 New York City, U.S.
- Died: April 26, 2026 (aged 73) Thousand Oaks, California, U.S.
- Areas: Writer, Editor
- Notable works: Punisher, Spider-Man, Justice League of America, Firestorm, Batman, Jason Todd, Ms. Marvel, Killer Croc
- Awards: Inkpot Award (2013)
- Spouses: Carla Conway (divorced); Karen; Laura Conway
- Children: 2

Gerard Francis Conway (September 10, 1952 – April 26, 2026) was an American comic book writer and editor, science fiction writer, screenwriter, and television writer and producer. He co-created the Marvel Comics vigilante antihero the Punisher, as well as Peter Parker's clone Ben Reilly, the super villain Jackal, and the first Ms. Marvel. He also wrote the death of the character Gwen Stacy during his long run on The Amazing Spider-Man in the story arc "The Night Gwen Stacy Died".

For DC Comics, he co-created the superheroes Firestorm, Power Girl, Jason Todd, and the villain Killer Croc, and wrote Justice League of America for eight years. Conway wrote the first major, modern-day intercompany crossover, Superman vs. the Amazing Spider-Man.

== Early life ==
Gerard Francis Conway was born in Brooklyn, New York City, on September 10, 1952. He was a fan of comics from a young age. A letter from him appears in Fantastic Four #50 (May 1966), written when Conway was 13.

He attended New York University for a time.

== Career ==
In the summer of 1967 at the age of 15, Conway began regularly attending weekly tours of DC Comics' New York offices, alongside young adults who would also later go on to write for the comics publisher including Len Wein, Marv Wolfman, Mark Hanerfeld, and Steve Mitchell. Through these tours Conway and the others formed connections with the editorial staff of DC and Conway in particular found a mentor in Dick Giordano, to whom he would bring his writing each week for tips and criticism. DC editor Murray Boltinoff, presumably believing that Conway was a selling regular stories to Giordano, offered to pay Conway for a horror story, and was shocked to find after many revisions of Conway's work that he was in fact the first to pay Conway for a story. Boltinoff did not publish Conway's work, though it did appear seven years later, uncredited, in The Unexpected #161 under the story title "Wake Me Before I Die!"

Conway first published professional work in a comic book appeared the next year when he was age 16, with the 6 1/2-page horror story "Aaron Philips' Photo Finish" in DC Comics' House of Secrets #81 (Sept. 1969). He continued selling such anthological stories for that series and for Marvel's Chamber of Darkness and Tower of Shadows through the end of 1970, by which time he had also published one-page text short stories in DC's All-Star Western #1 (Sept. 1970) and Super DC Giant #S-14 (Oct. 1970). He published his first continuing-character story in DC's semi-anthological occult comic The Phantom Stranger #10 (Dec. 1970).

Conway recalled breaking into Marvel Comics through Marvel editor Roy Thomas:

I'd been writing for DC Comics for two or three years...but to paraphrase the joke about the actor's ambitions to be a director, what I really wanted to do was write superheroes – specifically Marvel heroes. Through friends I'd become acquainted with Roy Thomas, who was Stan Lee's right-hand man at the time, and Roy offered me a shot at the Marvel 'writing test.' Stan wasn't impressed, but Roy liked what I did, and began throwing some short assignments my way, including scripting over his plot on an early Ka-Zar [story].

Following his first continuing-character story for Marvel, with his script for the jungle lord Ka-Zar in Astonishing Tales #3 (Dec. 1970), Conway began writing superhero stories with Daredevil #72 (Jan. 1971). He quickly went on to assignments on Iron Man, The Incredible Hulk, and both "The Inhumans" and "The Black Widow" features in the split book Amazing Adventures. He scripted the first Man-Thing story in 1971, sharing co-creation credit with Stan Lee and Roy Thomas. Conway eventually scripted virtually every major Marvel title, and co-created (with writers Roy and Jean Thomas and artist Mike Ploog) the lead character of the feature "Werewolf by Night", in Marvel Spotlight #2 (Feb. 1972); he also wrote the premiere issue of Marvel's The Tomb of Dracula, introducing the longstanding literary vampire into the Marvel universe.

=== Spider-Man and intercompany rotation ===
At 19, Conway began scripting The Amazing Spider-Man, succeeding Stan Lee as writer of one of Marvel's flagship titles. His run, from issues #111–149 (August 1972 – October 1975), included the landmark death of Gwen Stacy story in #121 (June 1973). Eight issues later, Conway and Andru introduced the Punisher as a conflicted antagonist for Spider-Man, as well as the Jackal. The Punisher became a popular star of numerous comic books and has been adapted into three movies and a live action television series. Conway additionally wrote Fantastic Four, from #133–152 (April 1973 – Nov. 1974).

In 2009, Conway reflected on writing flagship Marvel characters at a young age:

Precocity is a well-known curse; most of the pressure I felt as a younger writer was self-imposed. I wanted to be accepted by other writers and artists as an equal, which put me in some awkward situations — pretending to be more mature than I was, emotionally and professionally. As it happened, I was pretty good at faking a maturity I didn't have, which had advantages and, obviously, some disadvantages. I think people often forgot how young I was, and expected me to perform at a level that was actually beyond me. The result was, I was pretty stressed for most of my early career as a writer, and I often felt like I had no idea what I was doing —which was true. I wrote instinctively and from the gut; when those instincts were appropriate to the material I was writing – for example, when I was writing [The Amazing] Spider-Man — the results were something I was quite proud of, then and now. When my instincts were off, I didn't have the experience to either recognize it, or to compensate for it, with results that were more uneven.

In late 1972, Conway and writers Steve Englehart and Len Wein crafted a metafictional unofficial crossover spanning titles from both major comics companies. Each comic featured Englehart, Conway, and Wein, as well as Wein's first wife Glynis, interacting with Marvel or DC characters at the Rutland Halloween Parade in Rutland, Vermont. Beginning in Amazing Adventures #16 (by Englehart with art by Bob Brown and Frank McLaughlin), the story continued in Justice League of America #103 (by Wein, Dick Dillin and Dick Giordano), and concluded in Thor #207 (by Conway and penciler John Buscema). As Englehart explained in 2010, "It certainly seemed like a radical concept and we knew that we had to be subtle (laughs) and each story had to stand on its own, but we really worked it out. It's really worthwhile to read those stories back to back to back – it didn't matter to us that one was at DC and two were at Marvel – I think it was us being creative, thinking what would be really cool to do."

Conway returned to DC Comics in mid-1975, beginning with three books cover-dated Nov. 1975: Hercules Unbound #1, Kong the Untamed #3, and Swamp Thing #19. He wrote a revival of the Golden Age comic book series All Star Comics, which introduced the character Power Girl. Shortly afterward, he was chosen by Marvel and DC editors to script the historic intercompany crossover Superman vs. the Amazing Spider-Man #1, a 96-page, tabloid-sized, $2 one-shot, at a time when comic books sold for 25 cents.

He continued writing for DC, on titles including Superman, Detective Comics (starring Batman), Metal Men, Justice League of America, 1st Issue Special #11 starring Codename: Assassin, and that of the licensed character Tarzan. Conway briefly returned to Marvel where he succeeded Marv Wolfman as editor-in-chief in March 1976, but held the job only "about a month-and-a-half," relinquishing the post and being succeeded by Archie Goodwin.

For a time, a confluence of publishing schedules resulted in Conway stories appearing in both Marvel and DC comics in the same month: Conway's comic books with January 1977 cover-dates alone, for example, are Marvel's The Avengers, The Defenders, Captain Marvel, Iron Man, The Spectacular Spider-Man, and the premiere issues of Ms. Marvel and Logan's Run, and Superman and Action Comics.

=== DC Comics and later career ===
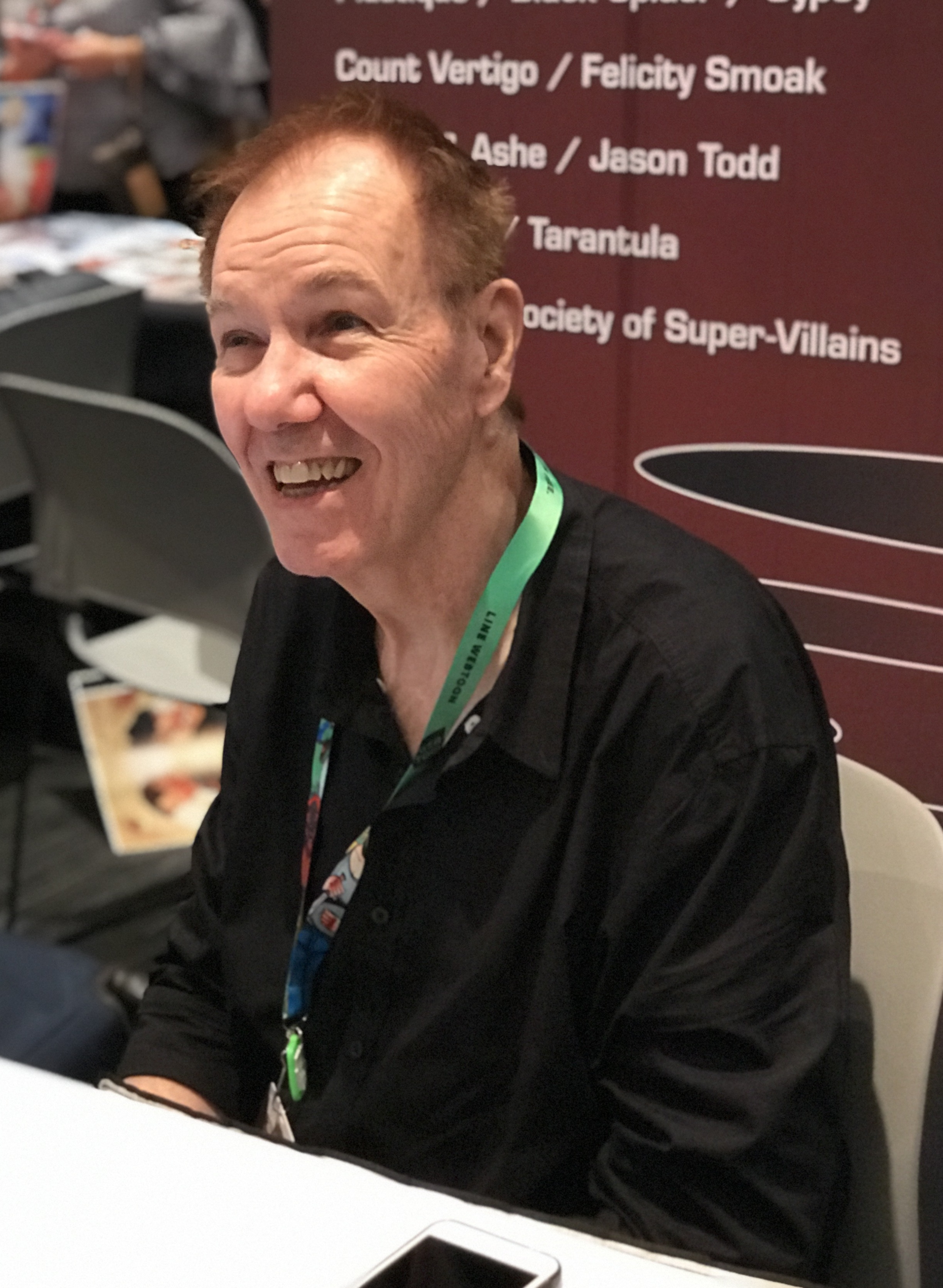
Conway at the 2017 New York Comic Con

After leaving Marvel's editorship, Conway again wrote exclusively for DC for the next decade writing both major and lesser titles – from those featuring Superman, Wonder Woman, and the Legion of Super-Heroes to such books as Weird Western Tales, Atari Force and Sun Devils. He had an eight-year run on Justice League of America, writing most issues from #151–255 (Feb. 1978 – Oct. 1986) including the double-sized anniversary issue #200 (March 1982). Conway wrote two additional Superman projects in the oversized tabloid format, Superman vs. Wonder Woman, drawn by José Luis García-López, and Superman vs. Shazam, drawn by Rich Buckler.

He co-created the characters Firestorm with artist Al Milgrom and Steel with artist Don Heck in the premiere issues (both March 1978) of the respective titular comics. Two other Conway co-creations, the Deserter (with artist Dick Ayers) and the Vixen (with artist Bob Oksner), were scheduled to receive their own series as well but were canceled before any issues were published. He additionally co-created the characters Vibe and Gypsy. As writer of Batman #337–359 (July 1981 – May 1983) and the feature "Batman" in Detective Comics #497–526 (Dec. 1980 – May 1983), he introduced the characters Killer Croc and Jason Todd, the latter of whom became the second Robin, succeeding original sidekick Dick Grayson. With artist Gene Colan, Conway revived the Golden Age supervillains Doctor Death in Batman #345 (March 1982) and the Monk in Batman #350 (Aug. 1982).

Conway was a frequent collaborator with Roy Thomas. Together they wrote a two-part Superman–Captain Marvel team-up in DC Comics Presents #33–34 (May–June 1981); the Atari Force and Swordquest mini-comics packaged with Atari 2600 video games; and three Justice League of America-Justice Society of America crossovers. Conway contributed ideas to the talking animal comic Captain Carrot and His Amazing Zoo Crew!, created by Thomas and Scott Shaw. Thomas and Conway were to be the co-writers of the JLA/Avengers intercompany crossover, but editorial disputes between DC and Marvel caused the project's cancellation. Conway was one of the contributors to the DC Challenge limited series in 1986.

He returned to Marvel in the 1980s and served as the regular writer of both The Spectacular Spider-Man and Web of Spider-Man from 1988 until 1990. Conway stated in 1991 that "I understand the character a lot better now than I did when I was nineteen. And one of the nice things about the Marvel characters is that you can keep them fresh by changing them just a bit." His run on Spectacular included such story arcs as the "Lobo Brothers Gang War". He relinquished writing duties on both titles when he became the story editor of the television series Father Dowling Mysteries. Conway's last recorded comic credits for many years were Topps Comics' "Kirbyverse" NightGlider #1 (April 1993), scripting from a Roy Thomas plot, and a story for Disney Adventures, published in 1995.

Conway returned to comics in 2009 and wrote DC Comics' The Last Days of Animal Man, with artist Chris Batista. In 2011, he wrote the DC Retroactive: Justice League – The '80s one-shot. Also for DC, he wrote the Firestorm feature in Legends of Tomorrow #1–6 in 2016.

In 2015, he returned to Spider-Man by writing a story in Spider-Verse Team Up #2, and the "Spiral" storyline in The Amazing Spider-Man #16.1–20.1. He returned to work as a series' regular writer that same year with Carnage which ran for 16 issues until 2017. In 2016, he returned to his creation the Punisher by writing The Punisher Annual #1. From 2016 to 2017, he wrote The Amazing Spider-Man: Renew Your Vows #1–9, followed by What If? Spider-Man #1 in 2018 and the oneshot The Amazing Spider-Man: Going Big, penciled by Mark Bagley, in 2019. In 2023, he was credited with the plot for the oneshot What If...? Dark: Spider-Gwen.

=== Novels and Star Trek comic strip ===
In addition to comics, Conway published two science-fiction novels: The Midnight Dancers and Mindship (originally published as a short story in the science fiction anthology Universe 1.) He also wrote the February 14–December 3, 1983, dailies of the syndicated newspaper comic strip Star Trek, based upon the 1960s TV series.

=== Screenplays and TV producing ===
Conway moved into screenwriting in the 1980s, starting with the animated feature Fire and Ice (1983), co-written with Roy Thomas, based on characters created by Ralph Bakshi and Frank Frazetta. Conway and Thomas wrote the story basis for Stanley Mann's screenplay for the film Conan the Destroyer (1984). Afterwards, Conway and Thomas also worked on the script of a live-action X-Men film for production company Nelvana, which went unproduced because of distributor Orion Pictures' financial troubles and subsequent bankruptcy.

Conway wrote, and later produced, such TV series as Father Dowling Mysteries, Diagnosis: Murder, Matlock, Jake and the Fatman, Under Suspicion, Hercules: The Legendary Journeys, Baywatch Nights, Pacific Blue, Silk Stalkings, Perry Mason telefilms, Law & Order, The Huntress, Law & Order: Criminal Intent, and two episodes of Batman: The Animated Series ("Appointment in Crime Alley", "Second Chance").

== Personal life and death ==
Conway's first wife was comic-book writer Carla Conway. The couple had a daughter, Cara. His second wife, Karen, is a psychologist who works with autistic children. They married in 1992 and had a daughter, Rachel. By 2015 Conway was married to Laura Conway, with whom he lived in Thousand Oaks, California.

Conway's ancestral family background is Irish, as he described in his blog:

In my case, on my mother's side, I'm a second-generation immigrant. My grandparents were born in Ireland. They came to America in the late 'teens of the last century and lived a life not very different from the life my housekeeper and her husband live today. My grandfather was a day laborer in the Brooklyn ship yards. My (step)-grandmother washed floors at Hunter College in Manhattan. (My biological grandmother died when my mother was eight years old, so I've no idea what she did to earn a living, but I assume it was either piece work or domestic work of some kind.) Because they were lower-class Irish, they were the Hispanics of their day – tolerated, but not embraced, by the larger society, and viewed with scorn by the WASP upper class. ... Even my father felt that anti-Irish prejudice, real or imagined. In the 1950s he once spoke, rather bitterly, about being one of the two 'token Irishmen' working at his company.

Conway was raised a Christian, but stated in a 2013 interview that he does not "have any religious belief at this point".

In October 2022, Conway was diagnosed with pancreatic cancer and underwent Whipple surgery to remove the tumor, resulting in several hospitalizations. In September 2023, he declared that he was cancer-free.

Gerry Conway died on April 26, 2026, in Thousand Oaks, California, from pancreatic cancer.

== Awards and recognition ==
In 2026, Conway was selected for inclusion in the Eisner Hall of Fame.

== Comics bibliography ==
=== Atlas/Seaboard Comics ===
- Destructor #4 (1975)
- Targitt #3 (1975)
- Tiger-Man #2–3 (1975)

=== DC Comics ===
- 1st Issue Special #11–13 (1976)
- Action Comics #457, 467, 477–479, 486, 517–523 (1976–1981)
- Adventure Comics #444, 459–460, 463–464 (1976–1979)
- All-New Collectors' Edition #C-54, C-58 (1978)
- All Star Comics #58–62 (1976)
- All-Star Squadron #8–9 (1982)
- The Amazing World of DC Comics #11 (1976)
- Arak, Son of Thunder #7 (1982)
- Atari Force #1–5 (1982–1983)
- Atari Force vol. 2 #1–13 (1984–1985)
- Batman #295, 305–306, 337–346, 348–359 (1978–1983)
- Batman Family #17 (1978)
- The Brave and the Bold #158, 161, 171–174 (1980–1981)
- Cancelled Comic Cavalcade #1–2 (1978)
- Challengers of the Unknown #81–87 (1977–1978)
- Cinder and Ashe #1–4 (1988)
- DC Challenge #8, 12 (1986)
- DC Comics Presents #17–18, 21, 30–33, 40, 45, 53, 68 (1980–1984)
- DC Retroactive: Justice League of America - The '80s #1 (2011)
- DC Special #28 (1977)
- DC Special Blue Ribbon Digest #5 (1980)
- DC Special Series #1, 6, 10, 16 (1977–1978)
- DC Super-Stars #18 (1978)
- Detective Comics #463–464, 497–499, 501–513, 515–526 (1976–1983)
- Doorway to Nightmare #2 (1978)
- Firestorm #1–5 (1978)
- The Flash #289–299, 301–304 (Firestorm backup stories) (1980–1981)
- Forbidden Tales of Dark Mansion #8 (1972)
- Freedom Fighters #1–2 (1976)
- The Fury of Firestorm #1–28, 31, 33–36, 38–53, 100, Annual #1–4 (1982–1986, 1990)
- Hercules Unbound #1–6 (1975–1976)
- Heroes Against Hunger #1 (1986)
- House of Mystery #188, 193, 196, 199–200, 202, 292–294, 296–297, 300 (1970–1982)
- House of Secrets #81, 83, 85–86, 88–89, 94, 111–112, 140, 150 (1969–1978)
- House of Secrets: The Bronze Age Omnibus Vol. 2 (story "Night of the Rat", originally intended for House of Secrets #141) (2019)
- Jonah Hex #40–41, 45–47 (1980–1981)
- Justice League of America #125–127, 131–134, 151–216, 219, 221–223, 228–230, 233–239, 241–255, Annual #2 (1975–1986)
- Kamandi #39–44 (1976)
- Kong the Untamed #3–5 (1975–1976)
- Last Days of Animal Man #1–6 (2009)
- Legends of Tomorrow #1–6 (Firestorm feature) (2016)
- Legion of Super-Heroes vol. 2 #259–278 (1980–1981)
- Man-Bat #1 (1975)
- Metal Men #46–48, 54–56 (1976–1978)
- Mystery in Space #114 (1980)
- New Gods #12–19 (1977–1978)
- The New Teen Titans #16 (Captain Carrot and His Amazing Zoo Crew! insert) (1982)
- Phantom Stranger vol. 2 #10–11 (1970–1971)
- Secret Hearts #143, 147, 149 (1970–1971)
- Secret Origins vol. 2 #4, 17 (1986–1987)
- Secret Society of Super Villains #1–2, 8–14 (1976–1978)
- Star Spangled War Stories #193 (1975)
- Steel, The Indestructible Man #1–5 (1978)
- Sun Devils #1–9 (1984–1985)
- Super-Team Family #11–15 (1977–1978)
- Superboy and the Legion of Super-Heroes #227, 232, 234–235, 248–249, 252–258 (1977–1979)
- Superman #301, 303–304, 307–309, 345–348, 350–351, 407 (1976–1985)
- The Superman Family #175, 184, 186–193, 195–202, 206–211 (1976–1981)
- Swamp Thing #19–20, 23–24 (1975–1976)
- Swordquest #1–3 (1982)
- Tarzan #250–254 (1976)
- The Unexpected #221 (1982)
- Weird Western Tales #45–58, 60–70 (Scalphunter feature) (1978–1980)
- The Witching Hour #10, 14, 27, 38 (1970–1974)
- Wonder Woman #233–241, 259–285, 329 (1977–1986)
- World's Finest Comics #245–254, 256–259, 261–262, 268–270, 272, 274–275 (1977–1982)
- Young Love #122 (1976)
- Zatanna Special #1 (1987)

=== DC Comics and Marvel Comics ===
- Superman vs. the Amazing Spider-Man #1 (1976)

=== Disney Comics ===
- Disney Adventures v5 #4 (1995)

=== Eclipse Comics ===
- The Unknown Worlds of Frank Brunner #2 (1985)

=== First Comics ===
- Hawkmoon: The Jewel in the Skull #1–4 (1986)
- Hawkmoon: The Mad God's Amulet #1–4 (1987)

=== Marvel Comics ===
- Adventure into Fear #10 (1972)
- Amazing Adventures #7, 9–11, 18–19 (1971–1973)
- The Amazing Spider-Man #111–149 (1972–1975), Annual #23 (1989)
- The Amazing Spider-Man vol. 3 #16.1–20.1 (2015)
- The Amazing Spider-Man: Going Big #1 (2019)
- The Amazing Spider-Man: Renew Your Vows #1–9 (2016–2017)
- Astonishing Tales #3–8 (1970–1971)
- The Avengers #151–157, Annual #6 (1976–1977)
- Black Widow the Coldest War GN (1990)
- Captain America #149–152 (1972)
- Captain Marvel #22, 47–48 (1972–1977)
- Carnage #1–16 (2015–2017)
- Chamber of Chills #1 (1972)
- Chamber of Darkness #3 (1970)
- Conan the Barbarian #226–231 (1989–1990)
- Creatures on the Loose #18 (1972)
- Daredevil #72–98, 118 (1971–1975)
- Daredevil Annual #5 (1989)
- Deadly Hands of Kung Fu #1, 3–4 (1974)
- The Defenders #42–45, 57 (1976–1978)
- Dracula Lives #1, 3–5, 7, 9, 12–13 (1973–1975)
- Fantastic Four #133–152, 179 (1973–1977)
- Ghost Rider #21–23 (1976–1977)
- Giant-Size Fantastic Four #2–3 (1974)
- Giant-Size Spider-Man #3–5 (1975)
- Giant-Size Super-Heroes #1 (Spider-Man) (1974)
- Giant-Size Super-Stars #1 (Fantastic Four) (1974)
- Haunt of Horror #1–2, 4 (1974)
- The Incredible Hulk #146–147, 171 (1971–1972, 1974)
- Iron Man #35–44, 91–97 (1971–1977)
- Justice #9–11, 13 (1987)
- Ka-Zar vol. 2 #6–10 (1974–1975)
- Kull and the Barbarians #2 (1975)
- Kull the Conqueror #4–7, 9–10 (1972–1973)
- Legion of Monsters #1 (1975)
- Logan's Run #1 (1977)
- Marvel Comics #1000 (2019)
- Marvel Comics Presents #101–109 (1992)
- Marvel Graphic Novel: Conan: The Horn of Azoth GN (1990)
- Marvel Graphic Novel: The Amazing Spider-Man: Parallel Lives GN (1989)
- Marvel Point One #1 (Carnage) (2015)
- Marvel Preview #2 (The Punisher) (1975)
- Marvel Spotlight #2–4 (1972)
- Marvel Super-Heroes vol. 2 #4 (1990)
- Marvel Team-Up #2–12, 28–37, 52 (1972–1976)
- Monsters on the Prowl #13 (1971)
- Monsters Unleashed #1–2, 6–7, 11 (1973–1975)
- Ms. Marvel #1–2 (1977)
- Our Love Story #15 (1972)
- Planet of the Apes #1 (1974)
- The Punisher Annual #1 (2016)
- Punisher Bloodlines #1 (1992)
- Savage Sword of Conan #166–169, 174 (1989–1990)
- Savage Tales #2, 6–10 (1973–1975)
- Sgt. Fury and his Howling Commandos #86, 117–119 (1971–1974)
- The Spectacular Spider-Man #1–3, 137–174, Annual #8–11 (1976–1977, 1988–1991)
- Spider-Man/Dr. Strange: The Way to Dusty Death #1 (1993)
- Spider-Man: Fear Itself GN (1992)
- Spider-Verse Team-Up #2 (2015)
- Spitfire and the Troubleshooters #1–6 (1986–1987)
- Sub-Mariner #40–49 (1971–1972)
- Tales of the Zombie #4, 10 (1974–1975)
- Thor #193–238 (1971–1975)
- ThunderCats #7–12, 24 (1986–1988)
- The Tomb of Dracula #1–2 (1972)
- Tower of Shadows #5 (1970)
- Unknown Worlds of Science Fiction #1–4 (1975)
- Vampire Tales #3, 8–10 (1974–1975)
- Visionaries #3–6 (1988)
- Web of Spider-Man #35–36, 47–48, 50–70, Annual #5–6 (1988–1990)
- Werewolf by Night #1–4, 9–10 (1972–1973)
- What If? Spider-Man #1 (2018)
- What If? Dark: Spider-Gwen #1 (plot) (2023)
- Worlds Unknown #1–2, 4, 6 (1973–1974)

=== Papercutz ===
- Nancy Drew: Girl Detective - The New Case Files #3 ("Together with the Hardy Boys") (2011)

=== Skywald Publications ===
- Nightmare #3 (1971)

=== Topps Comics ===
- NightGlider #1 (1993)

=== Warren Publications ===
- Creepy #38, 43, 103 (1971–1978)
- Eerie #32 (1971)
- Vampirella #10, 13 (1971)

== Screenwriting credits ==
=== Feature films ===
- Fire and Ice (1983)
- Conan the Destroyer (1984)

=== Television ===
- G.I. Joe: A Real American Hero (1985–1986)
  - Where the Reptiles Roam
  - Spell of the Siren
  - Cobra Claws Are Coming to Town
  - The Million Dollar Medic
  - Second Hand Emotions
- The Transformers (1986)
  - Forever Is a Long Time Coming
  - Money Is Everything
- The Centurions (1986)
  - Whalesong
  - Tornado of Terror
  - That Old Black Magic
  - Crack the World
  - The Mummy's Curse
  - Counterclock Crisis
  - Return of Cassandra
  - Ghost Warrior
  - Let the Lightning Fall
- My Little Pony (1986–1987)
  - Pony Puppy
  - Would Be Dragonslayer
  - The Golden Horseshoes: Part 1
  - The Golden Horseshoes: Part 2
- Dinosaucers (1987)
  - The Babysitter
- Spiral Zone (1987)
  - Canal Zone
  - The Power of the Press
  - The Darkness Within
  - Brother's Keeper
- Dino-Riders (1988)
  - The Adventure Begins
- Monsters (1990)
  - The Hole
- Father Dowling Mysteries (1990–1991)
  - The Confidence Mystery
  - The Legacy Mystery
  - The Royal Mystery
  - The Movie Mystery
  - The Murder Weekend Mystery
  - The Reasonable Doubt Mystery
  - The Substitute Sister Mystery
  - The Priest Killer Mystery
  - The Malibu Mystery
  - The Consulting Detective Mystery
- Jake and the Fatman (1992)
  - Stormy Weather: Part 1
  - Stormy Weather: Part 2
  - I Can't Believe I'm Losing You
- Perry Mason: The Case of the Heartbroken Bride (TV movie) (1992)
- Matlock (1992–1993)
  - The Big Payoff
  - The Ghost
  - The Haunted
- Batman: The Animated Series (1992, 1994)
  - Appointment in Crime Alley
  - Second Chance
- Diagnosis: Murder (1993–1997)
  - Inheritance of Death
  - Murder with Mirrors
  - Flashdance with Death
  - Lily
  - Shaker
  - The Plague
  - A Very Fatal Funeral
  - Playing for Keeps
  - Misdiagnosis Murder
  - Mind Over Murder
  - FMurder
  - In Defense of Murder
  - A History of Murder
  - Murder, Country Style
  - Physician, Murder Thyself
  - Malibu Fire
- Diagnosis: Murder - A Twist of the Knife (TV movie) (1993)
- Perry Mason: The Case of the Killer Kiss (TV Movie) (1993)
- Spider-Man: The Animated Series (1994)
  - Night of the Lizard
- Under Supspicion (1994–1995)
  - The Retarted Witness
  - Holy Suspect
- A Perry Mason Mystery: The Case of the Jealous Jokester (TV movie) (1995)
- Two (1996)
  - Black Ops
- Pacific Blue (1996)
  - Wheels of Fire
- Silk Stalkings (1996, 1998)
  - Services Rendered
  - Dead Again... And Again
- Players (1997)
  - Con Artist
  - Rashocon
  - Three of a Con
  - Conspiracy
  - Contamination
- Baywatch Nights (1997)
  - The Servant
- Hercules: The Legendary Journeys (1998–1999)
  - Norse by Norsevest
  - Somewhere Over the Rainbow Bridge
  - Stranger and Stranger
  - Fade Out
  - My Best Girl's Wedding
- Law & Order (1999–2000)
  - Hunters
  - Justice
  - Collision
  - High & Low
- The Huntress (2000–2001)
  - Partners
  - The Two Mrs. Thorsons: Part 1
  - The Two Mrs. Thorsons: Part 2
  - Generations
  - Ah, Wilderness
  - Showdown
  - With Great Power
  - The Quest: Part 1
  - The Quest: Part 2
- Law & Order: Criminal Intent (2003–2006)
  - Con-Text
  - Probability
  - Blink
  - But Not Forgotten
  - F.P.S.
  - Conscience
  - Semi-Detached
  - Collective
  - No Exit
  - Saving Face
  - Wrongful Life
  - The Good

Preceded by Marv Wolfman	Marvel Comics Editor-in-Chief; 1976	Succeeded by Archie Goodwin
Preceded by Allyn Brodsky	Iron Man writer 1971–1972 (with Allyn Brodsky in early 1971)	Succeeded by Gary Friedrich
Preceded by Roy Thomas	Daredevil writer 1971–1973	Succeeded by Steve Gerber
Preceded by Gary Friedrich	Captain America writer 1972	Succeeded by Steve Englehart
Preceded by Stan Lee	Thor writer 1971–1975	Succeeded by Bill Mantlo
Preceded by Roy Thomas	Fantastic Four writer 1973–1974	Succeeded by Roy Thomas
Preceded by Stan Lee	The Amazing Spider-Man writer 1973–1975	Succeeded by Len Wein
Preceded by Steve Englehart	The Incredible Hulk writer 1974 (with Roy Thomas)	Succeeded by Len Wein
Preceded by Steve Englehart	The Avengers writer 1976–1977	Succeeded by Jim Shooter
Preceded by Archie Goodwin	Iron Man writer 1976–1977 (with Herb Trimpe in late 1976 and early 1977) (with Bill Mantlo in late 1977)	Succeeded by Bill Mantlo
Preceded by Marv Wolfman	Daredevil writer 1976–1977 (with Jim Shooter)	Succeeded by Jim Shooter
Preceded by Steve Englehart	Justice League of America writer 1978–1986	Succeeded by J. M. DeMatteis
Preceded by Paul Levitz and Paul Kupperberg	Wonder Woman writer 1979–1981	Succeeded by Robert Kanigher
Preceded by Michael Fleisher	Detective Comics writer 1980–1983	Succeeded by Doug Moench
Preceded by Bob Rozakis and Roy Thomas	Batman writer 1981–1983	Succeeded by Doug Moench
Preceded by n/a	The Fury of Firestorm writer 1982–1986	Succeeded by Paul Kupperberg
Preceded by Peter David	The Spectacular Spider-Man writer 1988–1991	Succeeded by David Michelinie
Preceded by Peter David	Web of Spider-Man writer 1989–1990	Succeeded by Danny Fingeroth
