= Commander Steel =

Fictional superhero appearing in DC Comics

- The Nathan Heywood incarnation of Commander Steel as depicted in Justice Society of America vol. 3 #7 (September 2007). Art by Alex Ross.

Publication information
- Publisher: DC Comics
- First appearance: (Hank Heywood); Steel, The Indestructible Man # 1 (March 1978) (Hank Heywood III); Justice League of America Annual #2 (1984) (Nathan Heywood); Justice Society of America (vol. 3) #1 (February 2007)
- Created by: (Hank Heywood); Gerry Conway (writer); Don Heck (artist) (Hank Heywood III); Gerry Conway (writer); Chuck Patton (artist) (Nathan Heywood); Geoff Johns; Alex Ross

In-story information
- Alter ego: Henry "Hank" Heywood; Henry "Hank" Heywood III; Nathan "Nate" Heywood
- Team affiliations: (Hank); Justice Society of America; All-Star Squadron; Shadow Fighters; United States Marine Corps (Hank III); Justice League Detroit; Justice League (Nathan); Justice Society of America; Justice League
- Notable aliases: (Hank, Nathan); Steel
- Abilities: (Hank); Cyborg, great strength, limited invulnerability, limited superspeed (Hank III); Superhuman strength, limited invulnerability, limited superspeed, infrared vision, enhanced hearing (Nathan); Superhuman strength, invulnerability, organic metal skin, superhuman speed

Commander Steel (also known as Captain Steel, Citizen Steel and Sergeant Steel) is the name of three superheroes appearing in media published by DC Comics, all members of the same family. The first Steel appeared in Steel, The Indestructible Man #1 (1978), and was created by Gerry Conway and Don Heck. His stories were set in World War II. The two later characters called Steel are his grandsons.

Nate Heywood / Steel, his grandfather Henry Heywood / Commander Steel, and Nate's father Hank Heywood all appear in Legends of Tomorrow, portrayed by Nick Zano, Matthew MacCaull, and Thomas F. Wilson respectively.

== Creation ==
The character served as an homage to the Marvel Comics character, Captain America. Gerry Conway stated: "Steel was intended to be a tip of the hat to the original Captain America. My favorite Cap stories, when I was growing up, were the ones Stan and Jack set in World War II, so I was just trying to recapture that feeling."

== Publishing history ==
Steel first appeared in a series set in 1939, Steel: The Indestructible Man, written by Captain America writer Gerry Conway. The series was canceled after five issues, and Steel later made a guest-appearance in Justice League of America. Steel was also a member of the World War II era All-Star Squadron team. He made a prominent appearance many years later in four issues of the Eclipso ongoing series, where he was killed. After this, he appeared in issue #2 of the 2010 series, DC Universe: Legacies, which chronicled the superheroes of the 1940s.

Starting in 1984, the second Steel appeared as one of the lead characters in Justice League of America, until its cancellation during the Legends crossover in 1987. He made a single appearance several years later in issue #38 of Justice League America, a continuation of Justice League International, where he was killed. In 2006, he played a leading posthumous role in a single story arc of JLA Classified, which chronicled a previously unrevealed adventure of the Detroit-era JLA. In 2010, he played a major role in the two-issue Justice League of America vol. 2 tie-in to Blackest Night, where he was temporarily resurrected.

The third Steel made his debut in the 2007 relaunch of Justice Society of America, where he appeared for several years until the team was split into two separate groups by writers Bill Willingham and Lilah Sturges, where he appeared as one of the lead characters in JSA All-Stars. In 2011's The New 52 reboot of DC's continuity, he is shown to exist on Earth 2, under the name Captain Steel.

== Fictional character biography ==
=== Henry Heywood ===
Steel, The Indestructible Man #1 (March 1978). Pencilled by Don Heck and inked by Al Milgrom.

The World War II version of the character, Henry Heywood, enlisted in the United States Marine Corps prior to the United States involvement in the war but was injured when saboteurs, spearheaded by the man who would become Baron Blitzkrieg, attacked his base. Heywood had been a biology student under the tutelage of Doctor Gilbert Giles, and his former professor performed extensive surgery on him, enhancing his damaged body with mechanized steel devices that gave him superhuman strength, speed, and durability. At the request of Giles, Heywood kept his newfound gifts a secret and was returned to service in a desk position. Frustrated at his inability to help more directly, Heywood adopted the masked-hero persona "Steel", and was attempting to steal armaments from the military base where he worked—to send to those more directly in the war's fray—when some fifth columnist saboteurs broke into the base. Heywood defeated the saboteurs, and embarked on a career fighting foreign threats and other criminals before America went to war.

Heywood entered more directly into World War II as a secret weapon before he allied himself with the All-Star Squadron. In that time he was commissioned Commander Steel by Winston Churchill. His membership in the Squadron was only for a brief period as Crisis on Infinite Earths caused him to shift from his native Earth-Two to Earth-One, which later became the post-Crisis Earth. Hank retired from his superhero career, as there were no active costumed heroes at that time on his new home.

Years later, Heywood's son, Hank Haywood Junior, dies in the Vietnam War. Overcome by grief, Heywood blames his death on mortal weakness, and uses his resources as a wealthy industrialist to incorporate the same mechanized components into his grandson, Hank Haywood III. He financed the Detroit version of the Justice League and gave them his best worker, Dale Gunn, to serve as this version of the JLA's all purpose man. When he realized that this new League did not adhere to his now narrow beliefs, he enlisted Infinity Inc. to help him defeat them so that he could "straighten Hank out". The plan failed, and Hank suffered the indignity of being beaten by his grandson in hand-to-hand combat. They were estranged from that point on until Hank III was mortally wounded by one of Professor Ivo's androids.

After his grandson's death, Heywood resumes the mantle of Commander Steel and dies battling the supervillain Eclipso while a member of the Shadow Fighters.

=== Hank Heywood III ===
Hank Heywood III as the second Steel. Art by Tom Derenick.

The second Steel is Henry "Hank" Heywood III. Raised by his grandfather after the death of his parents, Heywood III was subject to the same procedure that created Commander Steel by his grandfather against his will.

Heywood III was a "Justice League Detroit" team member, joining the team after Aquaman has the team revamped, and with his grandfather's support provides the team with a new headquarters. Hank befriends Detroit youth Paco Ramone, who joins the team as the superhero Vibe. While on the team, Hank develops an attraction to Paco's sister Rosita, causing friction between the two men. As part of the Justice League, Heywood takes part in the Crisis on Infinite Earths, where the supervillain Warp sends him into the far future during a battle on Earth-S.

During the event "Legends", Martian Manhunter disbands the Justice League when the President of the United States outlaws all superhero activity. Taking to the streets regardless, Steel is mortally wounded in battle against an android belonging to Professor Ivo. His grandfather is unable to repair the injuries and turns off his grandson's life support at Martian Manhunter's suggestion.

During the Blackest Night event, Steel is reanimated as a member of the Black Lantern Corps. Alongside the Black Lantern Vibe, Steel attacks his former teammates, Gypsy and Vixen, until Doctor Light destroys him. He is later resurrected following The New 52 and DC Rebirth relaunches.

=== Nathan Heywood ===
The relaunched Justice Society of America features another member of the Heywood family. During an interview with Newsarama, new series writer Geoff Johns announced him as a brand new character with new powers. He debuted in Justice Society of America #2 with the name of Nathan "Buckeye" Heywood.

Nathan is the grandson of Henry Heywood and cousin of Henry Heywood III. Formerly a football star at the Ohio State University, Nathan retired after shattering his kneecap and having his leg amputated due to an undiagnosed infection. The incident left Nathan addicted to painkillers.

While attending a Heywood family reunion, Nathan is attacked by the Fourth Reich, a team of metahuman Neo-Nazis ordered by Vandal Savage to wipe out the bloodlines of Golden Age heroes. Both Nathan's brother and mother are turned into metal statues by the villain Reichsmark. Nathan jams his crutch into Reichsmark's mouth, causing him to spit liquid metal blood onto Nathan. Hawkman takes him to Doctor Mid-Nite, who notes that the metal is being absorbed by Nathan's skin. Nathan's brother and mother, in their metal forms, are moved to the rooftop of the JSA brownstone.

Later, it is revealed that the metal has grown out from where Nathan's amputated leg once was, forming metallic bone, muscles, and flesh. Doctor Mid-Nite informs Nathan that he is now a being of living steel due to an unknown reaction to Reichsmark's blood. However, the steel tissues do not give Nathan tactile response, meaning he cannot feel textures or temperatures, nor gauge exerted pressures, and his weight has greatly increased, causing his footsteps to crack the ground. He is given a costume, a "second skin" made of a stainless steel alloy that reduces his strength to a manageable level. Nathan then joins the Justice Society to defeat the Fourth Reich. Afterwards, the press asks if he is the new Commander Steel. Nathan denies it, saying that he is just an ordinary citizen, so he is called "Citizen Steel" by Power Girl.

== Powers and abilities ==
Originally Commander Steel could lift 1,000 pounds, but when he appeared in the pages of All-Star Squadron, he was attributed 'super-human' strength without an exact limit.

Citizen Steel's metallic body grants him superhuman strength and allows him to take direct blows from opponents as powerful as Gog, and remain standing, and in turn knocking him to the ground—the only one in the JSA able to do so—but at the cost of reducing his sense of touch so that he cannot really feel anything he comes in contact with, making it hard for him to judge how much effort he should put into doing things. His alloy suit limits his strength to controllable levels but at a cost of slowing him down, as well as making him so heavy that he has been shown cracking pavements just by walking. Upon removing his suit, he can unleash his full strength without being slowed down.

== Other versions ==
=== Earth 2 ===
In September 2011, DC Comics cancelled and relaunched its entire line of monthly comics, in an initiative called "The New 52", and in so doing, rebooted the continuity the DC Universe. There are two versions of Commander Steel on Earth 2:

==== Hank Heywood Jr. ====
Hank Heywood Jr. appears as Captain Steel in the comic series Earth 2. This version is a Filipino man whose bones were reinforced with experimental metal to prevent him from dying from a degenerative bone disorder. During Darkseid's invasion of Earth 2, Hank's father kills himself and destroys his research to prevent Parademons from obtaining it.

==== Sergeant Steel ====
Following a brief encounter with Ultra-Humanite, Fury opens the Pandora Vessel as a last resort to save the Wonders, with Earth-2 being recreated once again. A new version of Steel, Sergeant Steel, appears as the sole member of a super-soldier program called Americommando and the leader of an underground rebellion against the Ultra-Humanite.

== In other media ==
=== Television ===
Commander Steel as he appears in Justice League Unlimited.

- Hank Heywood III / Commander Steel makes non-speaking appearances in Justice League Unlimited as a member of the Justice League.
- Three characters based on the Heywoods appear in Legends of Tomorrow:
  - Historian Dr. Nathaniel "Nate" Heywood / Steel (portrayed by Nick Zano) is introduced in the second season as a hemophiliac until he is injected with a super serum that Eobard Thawne gave to the Nazis before the Legends retrieved it and Ray Palmer modified it to save Nate. After receiving the serum, he becomes a metahuman with superhuman strength and the ability to transform into organic steel. Nate takes the name "Steel" and joins the Legends in their adventures before leaving them in the series finale after he loses his powers due to mustard gas exposure and retires to the Wind Totem to maintain his relationship with Zari Tomaz.
  - Nate's grandfather Henry Heywood I / Commander Steel also appears in the second season, portrayed by Matthew MacCaull. This version is a member of the Justice Society of America (JSA) who operated during the 1940s before going missing and being presumed dead in the 1950s. In reality, Henry and the JSA assisted Rip Hunter in breaking the Spear of Destiny into several fragments and protecting them across different points in time, with Henry protecting his fragment in the 1970s, during which he became a NASA flight commander. Henry would later sacrifice himself to save the Legends from the Legion of Doom.
  - Nate's father and Henry's son Henry "Hank" Heywood II appears in the fourth season, portrayed by Thomas F. Wilson. This version is the Time Bureau's primary funder who secretly works with the demon Neron to capture mystical creatures and train them for use in the theme park "Heyworld", which he based on a drawing Nate made as a child. After discovering Nate is a superhero, Hank attempts to break off his partnership with Neron, only to be killed. Upon discovering Hank's true intentions, the Legends realize his dream.

=== Merchandise ===
- Henry Heywood / Commander Steel received an action figure in the DC Universe Classics line.
- Commander Steel received an action figure in Mattel's Justice League Unlimited line.
