= 1968 in comics =

Notable events of 1968 in comics.

== Publications and events ==
=== January ===
- January 6: The first issue of the Dutch children's magazine Bobo is published, which introduces the title comic Bobo the Rabbit, drawn by Sergio Cavina.
- January 11: The first episode of Marcel Gotlib's Rubrique-à-Brac is printed in Pilote.
- January 20: Lo Hartog van Banda and Dick Matena' De Argonautjes debuts in Pep. It will run until 1973.
- Superman's Girl Friend, Lois Lane #80, Lois Lane's fashions were updated to a then-more contemporary look

=== February ===
- February 10: The British comics magazines Fantastic and Terrific merge into Smash!.
- February 10: In Tintin, the first chapter of the Ric Hochet story Alias Ric Hochet, by André-Paul Duchâteau and Tibet is printed.
- February 15: In Pilote, the first chapter of Asterix at the Olympic Games by Goscinny and Uderzo is serialized.
- Tales of the Unexpected, with issue #105, changes its name to The Unexpected (February /March issue) (DC Comics)
- Zap Comix #1 by R. Crumb: published by Charles Plymell and Don Donahue/Apex Novelties; begins the underground comix movement. In the first issue Crumb's iconic Keep on Truckin' makes its debut.

=== March ===
- March 11: The first episode of Mort Walker's Boner's Ark is published. It will run until 2000.
- March 12: In Tintin, the first chapter of the Bruno Brazil story Le Requin qui mourut deux fois by Greg and William Vance is published.
- March 21: In Quino's Mafalda her brother Guille is born.
- March 23: In Corriere dei Piccoli, Zorry Kid by Benito Jacovitti makes its debut.
- Showcase #73, Writer-artist Steve Ditko arrives at DC and creates the Creeper with scripter Don Segall
- Max Bunker and Magnus' Maxmagnus makes its debut.

=== April ===
- April 4: In Pilote, the first chapter of the Lucky Luke story Dalton City, by Goscinny and Morris appears in print.
- April 14: John Miles starts publishing his comic strip Perkins, which will run until 1980.
- April 16: Dupa's Cubitus makes his debut in Tintin.
- The Miracle Machine introduced in Adventure Comics #367 (April)
- Tales of Suspense, with issue #100, changes its name to Captain America. (Marvel Comics)
- Tales to Astonish, with issue #102, changes its name to The Incredible Hulk. (Marvel Comics)
- Dick Giordano hired as an editor at DC Comics (from Charlton Comics); Giordano brings with him some of the creators he had nurtured at Charlton, including writer Dennis O'Neil.

=== May ===
- May 14: In Le journal de Tintin, the first chapter of the Michel Vaillant story Le Fantôme des 24 heures by Jean Graton appears in print.
- May 17: A theme park built around the comic strip Li'l Abner opens, Dogpatch USA. It's located in Arkansas between the cities of Harrison and Jasper and will last until 1993.
- Gilbert Shelton's Fabulous Furry Freak Brothers makes its debut in the underground newspaper Rag.
- The first issue of the underground comics magazine Yellow Dog is published. It will run until 1973.
- The storyline "Mordru the Merciless", by Jim Shooter, Curt Swan, and Jack Abel, begins in Adventure Comics #369 (concluding next issue). (DC Comics)
- House of Mystery, with issue #174 (May/June cover date), returns to its overt horror comics roots. New editor Joe Orlando challenges the Comics Code Authority with a reprint issue of old horror/suspense stories.
- World's Finest Comics #175, "The Superman-Batman Revenge Squads" marks Neal Adams's first work on a Batman story.
- The first run of Strange Tales ends. It will be revived in September 1973.
- Jean Van Hamme and Paul Cuvelier release their erotic graphic novel Epoxy.

=== June ===
- June 18: The last issue of Byron Aptosoglou's Mikrós Íros (The Little Hero) is published.
- Wally Wood's Sally Forth makes her debut in Military News.
- Strange Tales, with issue #169, changes its name to Doctor Strange. (Marvel Comics).
- Steve Ditko and Steve Skeates' Hawk and Dove make their debut.
- The American comics magazine Four Color is terminated.
- His Name Is... Savage by Gil Kane and Robert Franklin (Archie Goodwin) (Adventure House press), one of the first American graphic novels.

=== July ===
- July 11 : In the magazine Pilote, the first chapter of the Blueberry story General Tête jaune by Jean-Michel Charlier and Jean Giraud is printed. It ends the narrative saga about the "iron horse".
- July 25 : In Pilote, the first chapter of the Valérian and Laureline story The City of Shifting Waters, by Pierre Christin and Jean-Claude Mezieres is published.
- July 31: Franklin makes his debut in Charles M. Schulz' Peanuts.
- Spain Rodriguez's Trashman makes its debut.
- Canadian comics store owner George Henderson of Memory Lane in Toronto organizes the first Canadian comic book convention the Triple Fan Fair, which also celebrates science fiction and classic cinema.

=== Summer ===
- In the summer, the first issue of the influential underground comix magazine Bijou Funnies is published, which marks the debut of Jay Lynch's Nard 'n' Pat and Skip Williamson's Snappy Sammy Smoot.

=== August ===
- August 13 : In Le journal de Tintin, the first chapter of the Ric Hochet storyLes Cinq Revenants, by André-Paul Duchâteau and Tibet is printed.
- August 29: Raoul Cauvin and Louis Salvérius's comic strip Les Tuniques Bleues makes its debut in Spirou.
- August 31: In David Law's Dennis the Menace and Gnasher Dennis' dog Gnasher makes his debut.
- The Legion Academy introduced in Adventure Comics #371 (August)
- Robert Crumb's Angelfood McSpade and S. Clay Wilson's The Checkered Demon makes their debut in Zap Comix #2.
- Debut of Dave Wood and Jack Sparling's The Mad Mod Witch in The Unexpected.
- Joe Orlando, Carmine Infantino, Sheldon Mayer and Sergio Aragonés's Bat Lash makes its debut.

=== Fall ===
- Gary Arlington's San Francisco Comic Book Company debuts as a retailer and a publisher, putting out Rory Hayes' Bogeyman Comics #1

=== September ===
- September 7: The final issue of the British comics magazine Pow! is published and merges with Smash!.
- September 9: Bunny Hoest and John Reiner's The Lockhorns makes its debut.
- September 26: The first episode of Paul Deliège and Arthur Piroton's series Les Krostons debuts in Spirou.
- September 30: B.D. makes his debut in Garry Trudeau's Bull Tales and later become part of Doonesbury.
- Doom Patrol, with issue #121 (September /October cover date) suspends publication. (DC Comics)
- Lo spettro del passato, by Guido Nolitta and Franco Donatelli; the whaler Captain Fishleg, recurring character in the Zagor series, makes his debut.

=== October ===
- October 1: In Pilote, namely their pocket edition Super Pocket Pilote, the first episode of the Blueberry series Le Secret de Blueberry, by Jean Michel Charlier and Jean Giraud, inaugurates the saga The Blueberry’s youth (or The traitor of the South).
- October 6: The final episode of Boots and Her Buddies is published.
- October 11: The Dutch comics appreciation society Het Stripschap is founded.
- October 31 : In the French comic magazine Pilote, the first chapter of the Asterix story Asterix and the Cauldron, by René Goscinny and Albert Uderzo, is published.
- Blackhawk (1944 series), with issue #243 (Oct./Nov. cover date) suspends publication. (DC Comics). The series is put on hiatus until 1976.
- Captain Action #1: 17-year-old Jim Shooter writes the first issue of DC's first toy tie-in.
- Wonder Woman #178: Dennis O'Neil and Mike Sekowsky become the new creative team on the title.
- Mysterious Suspense #1 by Charlton Comics presents the first appearance of Steve Ditko's The Question in his own title.
- The first volume of the long-running manga series Golgo 13 is published by creator Takao Saito.

=== November ===
- November 7: The Beatles member John Lennon draws a comic for the macrobiotic magazine Harmony, later printed in its pages.
- November 8: In Amsterdam, the Netherlands, the oldest comics store in Europe, Lambiek, is opened by Kees Kousemaker.
- November 12: Peter van Straaten's Vader & Zoon makes its debut and will run until 1987.
- November 12: In the Belgian comic magazine Le journal de Tintin the first episode of the Michel Vaillant story De l’huille sur la piste! by Jean Graton is published.
- November 23: Bonvi's Sturmtruppen makes its debut.
- Blue Beetle: the third run of this series is cancelled. The series will not be revived until June 1986.
- Brother Power the Geek, with issue #2, cancelled by DC.
- Marvel's Space-Born Superhero: Captain Marvel, with issue #7, changes its title to Captain Marvel. (Marvel Comics)
- Summer Love, with issue #48, cancelled by Charlton.

=== December ===
- December 6: The Spanish comics magazine En Patufet, which was disestablished 30 years ago, is revived and will run until 29 June 1973.
- December 18: Andries Brandt's Horre, Harm en Hella makes its debut. It will run until 11 March 1971.
- With issue #9, Captain Savage and His Leatherneck Raiders is retitled Captain Savage and His Battlefield Raiders.
- In the story Tycoonraker! or From Zantaf with Lumps!, by Luciano Bottaro and Carlo Chendi, Dr. Zantaf makes his debut.

=== Specific date unknown ===
- With Kinney National Company's acquisition of Warner Bros., DC Comics becomes part of what eventually will be known as Warner Communications.
- DC Comics art director (and soon-to-be editorial director) Carmine Infantino is given the mandate to revitalize DC in the wake of rival Marvel Comics' pop-culture success. Eased out are long-time DC artists Wayne Boring, Jim Mooney, George Klein, and George Papp; and writers Otto Binder, Edmond Hamilton, and Superman co-creator Jerry Siegel. In exchange, Infantino hires new talent and promotes artists like Joe Orlando, Joe Kubert, and Mike Sekowsky to editorial positions. Orlando is put in charge of DC's horror and suspense titles.
- The final episode of Peter O'Donnell and Alfred Sindall's Tug Transom ends in 1968.
- Tom Wilson's Ziggy makes its debut.
- Brumsic Brandon Jr.'s Luther makes its debut.
- The first issue of Lance Spearman is published.
- Robert Maynar Hutchins and John Hubley's Zuckerkandl! is first published.
- The final episode of William St. John Glenn's Ballyscunnion is published.
- Salsa musician Izzy Sanabria illustrates the cover of the album The Alegere All-Stars in Lost & Found, Volume III in comic strip style.
- The first episode of Angus McGill and Dominic Poelsma's Clive is published.

== Deaths ==
=== January ===
- January 1: Käthe Olshausen-Schönberger, Austrian illustrator and comics artist (Aus Thier und Menschenleben), dies at age 86.
- January 8: Don Flowers, American comics artist (Oh Diana, Modest Maidens (later retitled Glamor Girls)), dies at age 59.
- January 16: Vladmir Delac, Yugoslavian comics artist and animator (Svemirko, Viki and Niki, Marina, Tramvajko), dies at age 60 from cancer.
- January 18: Emmérico Nunes, Portuguese comics artist, dies at age 80.
- January 22: Chaval, French cartoonist, commits suicide at age 52, after his wife's death.
- Specific date unknown: Steve Muffati, American animator and comics artist (Harvey Comics), dies at age 57.

=== February ===
- February 22: Peter Arno, American cartoonist (The New Yorker), dies at age 64 from emphysema.

=== March ===
- March 4: Rocke Mastroserio, Italian-American comics artist (Charlton Comics, co-creator of Mercury Man), dies at age 40 of a heart attack.
- March 12: Ted Osborne, American comics writer (Disney comics), dies at age 68. (or age 67)

=== April ===
- April 4: Roland J. Scott, a.k.a. R.J. Scott, American comic artist (Sally's Sallies, Scott's Scrapbook), dies at age 81.
- April 20: Rudolph Dirks, German-American comics artist (The Katzenjammer Kids, The Captain and the Kids), dies at age 91.
- April 22: Jan Waterschoot, Belgian comics artist (Johnny de Weesjongen), dies at age 85.

=== May ===
- May 9: Harold Gray, American comics artist (Little Orphan Annie), dies at age 74.

=== June ===
- June 7: Arie Emens, Dutch illustrator and comics artist (Betje Kuis), dies at age 72.

=== July ===
- July 16: Enver Bongrani, Italian comics artist (Zeffirino), dies at age 54.
- July 25: Hallvard Sandnes, Norwegian schoolteacher and comic writer (Ingeniør Knut Berg på eventyr), dies at age 75.

=== August ===
- August 3: Neil O'Keeffe, American comics artist and illustrator (Dick's Adventures in Dreamland, continued Inspector Wade), dies at age 77.
- August 17: Bruno Paul, German comics illustrator, architect and comics artist, dies at age 94.
- August 21: Ernie Bache, American comics artist (assisted on Dean Marshall and Perry Mason), worked for Atlas Comics and Charlton Comics), dies at age 45 years.

=== September ===
- September 1: Gus Bofa, French comics artist and illustrator (Chez Les Toubibs), dies at age 85.
- September 30: Alexander Bojinov, Bulgarian comics artist (Bulgaran, Azbuka za Malkite), dies at age 90.

=== October ===
- October 1: Quin Hall, American comics artist (The Dolittles, Peter Plink), dies at age 84.
- October 18: Mary A. Hays, American comics artist (Kate and Karl, the Cranford Kids), dies at age 70.

=== November ===
- November 3: Étienne Le Rallic, a.k.a. Smile or Levesque, French illustrator and comics artist (various one-shot realistic comics), dies at age 78.
- November 15: Bob Grant, American comics artist (Disney comics), dies at age 62.
- November 29: Mo Leff, American comics artist (continued Joe Jinks as Curly Kayoe), dies at age 56.
- Specific date in November unknown: Al Zere, American comic artist (So This Is Married Life, The Wows, Flossie, Rookie Joe, continued Susie Sunshine), dies at age 79.

=== December ===
- December 13: Ken Hultgren, American animator and comics artist (Disney comics, Hanna-Barbera comics), dies from a heart attack at age 63.
- December 23: Henry Meyer Brockmann, German editorial cartoonist, dies at age 55.
- December 30: Bill Tytla, Ukrainian-American animator (Disney Studios, Terrytoons, Famous Studios), dies at age 64.

=== Specific date unknown ===
- Edgar Henry Banger, a.k.a. Harry Banger, British comics artist (Koko the Pup, Chubb and Tubb, Skit the Kat, Stoogie, Dilly Duckling, Boney Prince Charlie, Dudley Dudd the Dud Detective, Coal Black Jones), dies at age 71.
- Bob Forrest, British illustrator and comics artist (made comics for the Amalgamated Press and Fleetway), dies at age 60 or 61.
- Bernard Jeanson, French comics artist (Toto Bulldozer) commits suicide at age 33 or 34.
- Barye Phillips, American illustrator and comic artist (drew comics for Famous Fiction, syndicated by the Bell Syndicate), dies at age 62 or 63.
- Frank Thomas, American comics artist (Dinky Doyle, All-American Football, Going West, Hossface Hank, continued Ferd'nand), dies at age 53 or 54.

== Conventions ==
- June 15–16: Detroit Triple Fan Fair (Fort Pick Shelby Hotel, Detroit, Michigan) — Guest of Honor Harlan Ellison; c. 175 attendees
- June 21–23: Southwesterncon III (Hotel Southland, Dallas, Texas) — 160 attendees; produced by Larry Herndon & Tom Reamy; official guests include Fritz Leiber, Harold LeDoux (guest of honor), and H. H. Hollis
- June 28–30: Gateway Con 2 (St. Louis, Missouri) — produced by Bob Schoenfeld; guest of honor Roy Thomas
- June 29–30: Toronto Triple Fan Fair (594 Markam Street, Toronto, ON, Canada) — also known as "Fan Fair I;" organized and managed by George Henderson (sponsored by OSFiC, Memory Lane, the Canadian Academy of Comic Book Collectors, and the Markam Village Film Club); Guests of Honor Roger Zelazny and Stan Lee; admission $1 for "passport" to all venues
- July 4–7: International Convention of Comic Book Art (Statler Hilton Hotel, New York City) — Phil Seuling hosts his first comic book convention (later to be known as the Comic Art Convention) under the aegis of SCARP (Society for Comic Art Research and Preservation, Inc.); guests of honor: Will Eisner and Burne Hogarth. Featured speakers include Stan Lee, Milton Caniff, Lee Falk, and Charles Biro. Professional guests include Neal Adams, Dan Adkins, Murphy Anderson, Dick Ayers, Vaughn Bodē, E. Nelson Bridwell, Nick Cardy, Gene Colan, Leonard Darvin, Sol Davidson, Arnold Drake, Creig Flessel, Woody Gelman, Dick Giordano, Archie Goodwin, Bill Harris, Larry Ivie, Jeff Jones, Gil Kane, Gray Morrow, Joe Orlando, Jerry Robinson, John Romita, Richard Sherry, Jerry Siegel, Leonard Starr, Jim Steranko, Roy Thomas, Sal Trapani, John Verpoorten, Al Williamson, and Wally Wood.
- August 30 – September 2: Comicon '68 (British Comic Art Convention) (Midland Hotel, Birmingham, England) — first annual event, organized by Phil Clarke; "member"-guests include Alan Moore, Paul Neary, Jim Baikie, Steve Moore, and Nick Landau; 70 attendees
- November 16–17: Salone Internazionale dei Comics (Lucca, Italy) — 4th edition of this festival

== Awards ==
=== Alley Awards ===
Presented at the Comic Art Convention, July 1969

Comic Magazine Section

- Best Adventure Title – Fantastic Four
- Best Fantasy/SF/Supernatural Title – Doctor Strange (Marvel Comics)
- Best Western Title – Bat Lash (Dc Comics)
- Best War Title – Sgt. Fury and his Howling Commandos (Marvel Comics)
- Best Humor Title – Not Brand Echh (Marvel Comics)
- Best Romance Title – Millie the Model (Marvel Comics)
- Best Reprint Title – Marvel Super-Heroes (Marvel Comics)

Professional Work

- Best Editor – Stan Lee
- Best Writer – Stan Lee
- Best Pencil Artist – Jim Steranko
- Best Inking Artist – Joe Sinnott
- Best Cover – Nick Fury, Agent of S.H.I.E.L.D. #6, by Jim Steranko (Marvel Comics)
- Best Full-Length Story – (tie) "Track of the Hook", by Bob Haney & Neal Adams, The Brave and the Bold #79 (DC Comics); "Origin of the Silver Surfer", by Stan Lee & John Buscema, The Silver Surfer #1 (Marvel Comics)
- Best Feature Story – "Today Earth Died", by Jim Steranko, Strange Tales #168 (Marvel Comics)
- Best Regular Short Feature – "Tales of the Inhumans", by Stan Lee & Jack Kirby, in The Mighty Thor (Marvel Comics)
- Hall of Fame – Fantastic Four, by Stan Lee & Jack Kirby; Nick Fury, Agent of S.H.I.E.L.D., by Jim Steranko (Marvel Comics)

Popularity Poll

- Best Adventure Hero Strip – The Amazing Spider-Man (Marvel Comics)
- Best Adventure Group Strip – Fantastic Four (Marvel Comics)
- Best Supporting Character – J. Jonah Jameson (The Amazing Spider-Man) (Marvel Comics)
- Best Villain – Doctor Doom (Fantastic Four) (Marvel Comics)
- Best New Strip – The Silver Surfer by Stan Lee & John Buscema (Marvel Comics)
- Strip Most Needing Improvement – X-Men (Marvel Comics)
- Strip Most Desired for Revival – Adam Strange (DC Comics)

Newspaper Strip Section

- Best Adventure Strip – Prince Valiant, by Hal Foster
- Best Human Interest Strip – On Stage (also known as Mary Perkins, On Stage), by Leonard Starr
- Best Humor Strip – Peanuts, by Charles Schulz
- Best Humor Panel – Dennis the Menace, by Hank Ketcham
- Best Miscellaneous Strip – Feiffer, by Jules Feiffer
- Hall of Fame – Peanuts, by Charles Schulz

Fan Activity Section

- Best Limited Reproduction Fanzine – Concussion
- Best Unlimited Reproduction Fanzine – Graphic Story Magazine
- Best Fan Artist – John Fantucchio
- Best Comic Strip Writer – Larry Herndon
- Best Fan Project – The Alley Awards

== First issues by title ==
=== Charlton Comics ===
Ghost Manor

Release: July. Editor: Sal Gentile.

=== DC Comics ===
Bat Lash

Release: October /November Writers: Sergio Aragonés and Dennis O'Neil. Artist: Nick Cardy.

Beware the Creeper

Release: May/June. Writers: Steve Ditko and Dennis O'Neil. Artist: Steve Ditko.

Brother Power the Geek

Release: September /October Writer: Joe Simon. Artist: Al Bare.

DC Special

Release: October /December Editor: Julius Schwartz.

Secret Six

Release: April /May. Writer: E. Nelson Bridwell. Artist: Frank Springer.

=== Marvel Comics ===
Marvel's Space-Born Superhero: Captain Marvel

Release: May. Writer: Roy Thomas. Artists: Gene Colan and Vince Colletta.

Iron Man

Release: May. Writer: Archie Goodwin. Artists: Gene Colan and Johnny Craig.

Nick Fury, Agent of S.H.I.E.L.D.

Release: June. Writer/Artist: Jim Steranko.

Prince Namor, the Sub-Mariner

Release: May. Writer: Roy Thomas. Artists: John Buscema and Frank Giacoia.

Silver Surfer

Release: August. Writer: Stan Lee. Artists: John Buscema and Joe Sinnott.

=== Independent titles ===
Bijou Funnies

Release: Summer by Bijou Publishing Empire. Editor: Jay Lynch.

Feds 'N' Heads

Release: Spring by Gilbert Shelton (self-published). Writer/Artist: Gilbert Shelton.

Walt Disney Comics Digest

Release: June by Gold Key Comics. Editor: Del Connell.

Yellow Dog

Release: May by Print Mint. Editor: Don Schencker.

Zap Comix

Release: February by Apex Novelties. Writer/Artist: R. Crumb.

=== Japan ===
Big Comic

Release February by Shogakukan

Shōjo Comic

Release by Shogakukan

Weekly Shōnen Jump

Release July by Shueisha

== Initial appearance by character name ==
=== DC Comics ===
- Angel O'Day, in Showcase #77 (September)
- Anthro, in Showcase #74 (May)
- Bat Lash, in Showcase #76 (August)
- Brother Power the Geek, in Brother Power the Geek #1 (October)
- Cain, in House of Mystery #175 (July)
- Chemical King, in Adventure Comics #371 (August)
- Copperhead, in The Brave and the Bold #78 (June)
- Creeper, in Showcase #73 (March)
- Crimson Dawn, in Secret Six #1 (May)
- Doctor Cyber, in Wonder Woman #179 (November)
- Dolphin, in Showcase #79 (December)
- Jonny Double, in Showcase #78 (November)
- Guy Gardner, in Green Lantern #59 (March)
- Hank Hall, in Showcase #75 (June)
- Don Hall, in Showcase #75 (June)
- I Ching, in Wonder Woman #179 (November)
- King Savage, in Secret Six #1 (May)
- Lili de Neuve, in Secret Six #1 (May)
- League of Assassins, in Strange Adventures #215 (November)
- Legion of Super-Villains, in Adventure Comics #372 (September)
- Leland McCauley, in Adventure Comics #374 (November)
- Mike Tempest, in Secret Six #1 (May)
- Mordru, in Adventure Comics #369 (June)
- Red Star, in Teen Titans #18 (December)
- Red Tornado, in Justice League of America #64 (August)
- Sam Simeon, in Showcase #77 (September)
- Scavenger, in Aquaman #37 (January)
- Sensei, in Strange Adventures #215 (November)
- Shadow Lass, in Adventure Comics #365 (February)
- Tim Trench, in Wonder Woman #179 (November–December)
- Tornado Twins, in Adventure Comics #373 (October)
- Wanderers, in Adventure Comics #375 (December)
- General Zahl, in Doom Patrol #121 (October)

=== Marvel Comics ===
- Annihilus, in Fantastic Four Annual #6 (November)
- Aragorn, in The Avengers #48 (January)
- Badoon, in Silver Surfer #2 (October)
- Blacklash, in Tales of Suspense #97 (January)
- Centurius, in Nick Fury, Agent of S.H.I.E.L.D. #2 (July)
- Carol Danvers, in Marvel Super-Heroes #13 (March)
- Death-Stalker, in Daredevil #39 (April)
- Doctor Faustus, in Captain America #107 (November)
- Lemuel Dorcas, in Sub-Mariner #5 (September)
- Falcona, in The Incredible Hulk Annual #1 (October)
- Whitney Frost, in Tales of Suspense #98 (February)
- Gortokians, in X-Men #41 (February)
- Grim Reaper, in The Avengers #52 (May)
- Jester (Jonathan Powers), in Daredevil #42 (July)
- Leonus, in The Incredible Hulk Annual #1 (October)
- Mangog, in Thor #154 (July)
- Mephisto, in Silver Surfer #3 (December)
- Mesmero, in X-Men #49 (March)
- Missing Link, in The Incredible Hulk #105 (July)
- Franklin Richards, in Fantastic Four Annual #6 (November)
- Randy Robertson, in The Amazing Spider-Man #67 (December)
- Satannish, in Doctor Strange #174 (November)
- Shalla-Bal, in Silver Surfer #1 (August)
- George Stacy, in The Amazing Spider-Man #56 (January)
- Stallior, in The Incredible Hulk Annual #1 (Oct.)
- Tiger Shark, in Prince Namor, the Sub-Mariner #5 (September)
- Typhon, in The Avengers #49 (February)
- Ultron, in The Avengers #54 (July)
- Vision, in The Avengers #57 (October)
- Wrecker, in The Mighty Thor #148 (January)

=== Independent titles ===
- B. D. (Doonesbury), in "Bull Tales" (Yale Daily News, September 30)
- The Checkered Demon, in Zap Comix #2 (Apex Novelties, August)
- The Fabulous Furry Freak Brothers, in Feds 'n' Heads (Gilbert Shelton; self-published)
- Franklin, in Peanuts (July 31)
- Marcie, in Peanuts (June 18)
- Maxmagnus, in Eureka
- Trashman, in the East Village Other (July)
- Snappy Sammy Smoot in Bijou Funnies #1 (Bijou Publishing Empire, Summer)
