= Merciless =

Merciless means a lack of mercy, leniency or compassion.

Merciless may also refer to:

== Music ==
- Merciless (band), a Swedish metal band
- Merciless (DJ), Jamaican dancehall DJ Leonard Bartley (born 1971)
- Merciless (Body Count album), a 2024 album by Body Count
- Merciless (Stephanie Mills album), a 1983 album by Stephanie Mills
- Merciless (EP), a 1994 EP by Godflesh
- Merciless, a 2003 album by Merciless
- Merciless, a 2005 album by Most Precious Blood
- The Merciless, a 2004 album by Aura Noir

== Other uses ==
- The Merciless, a 2017 South Korean crime-action film
- "Merciless", nickname of Ray Mercer (born 1961), American retired boxer, kickboxer and mixed martial artist

== See also ==
- Ming the Merciless, the main villain in the Flash Gordon comic strip and related works
- Mordru the Merciless, the villain in the DC Comics story arc of the same name
