= Howard Post =

American cartoonist

- Born: November 2, 1926 New York City, United States
- Died: May 22, 2010 (aged 83) Hackensack, New Jersey, United States
- Areas: Writer, Penciller, Inker
- Pseudonym: Howie Post
- Notable works: The Dropouts; Anthro
- Awards: Inkpot Award (2003)

Howard Post (November 2, 1926 – May 21, 2010) was an American animator, cartoonist, and comic strip and comic book writer-artist. Post is known for his syndicated newspaper comic strip, The Dropouts, which had a 13-year run, and for creating DC Comics' Anthro.

== Early life and career ==
Born in New York City, Post grew up in the Coney Island and Sheepshead Bay neighborhoods of Brooklyn and then in the Bronx. In a 1999 interview, he recalled his father's influence on his start in drawing and:

I may have started rather early; just to entertain myself drawing these things. I could have been four or five. I used to draw on a piece of paper while lying on the floor, and my father would come home from work and he'd squat down next to me and say, "The lion's jaw is broader than that, y'know?"... After his passage I found a book of his full of dress designs he had made himself. He was in the fashion business, mostly in furs; he was a cutter. What he had drawn were his own designs for coats and dresses, and they were just exquisite. He never ever let on that he could draw like that; we never knew he had that in him. He was busy making a living, as hard and fast as he could. We're talking about bringing up a family in Depression days.

As a teenager, Post attended the Hastings School of Animation in New York City. At age 16 or 17, his father was stricken with tuberculosis and hospitalized, making Post the primary breadwinner for a family of four. At Paramount Pictures' animation studio, Famous Studios, he earned $24 a week as an in-betweener.

== Comic books ==
To supplement what was considered a meager income, Post broke into comic books, first being rejected by the L. B. Cole studio on 42nd Street and then successfully selling work to artist Bernard Baily on West 43rd. Post's earliest confirmed comic book art appeared in 1945: the cover of publisher Prize Comics' Wonderland Comics #2, and the five-page "3-Alarm Fire!", starring Hopeless Henry, in Cambridge House Publishers' Gold Medal Comics #1. Credited as Howie Post, he soon began drawing for the company that would become DC Comics, including the features "Jimminy and the Magic Book" in More Fun Comics, "Rodeo Rick" in Western Comics, "Presto Pete" in Animal Antics, "Chick 'n Gumbo" in Funny Folks, and "J. Rufus Lion" in Comic Cavalcade, among other works. During the 1950s, he drew many humorous stories for the satirical comics Crazy, Wild, and Riot, from Marvel Comics' 1950s forerunner, Atlas Comics, as well as occasional stories in their publisher's horror comics, including Journey into Mystery, Uncanny Tales, and Mystery Tales. As Howie Post, he drew the three-issue run of Atlas' The Monkey and the Bear (Sept. 1953 - Jan. 1954).

== Harvey Comics and later career at Famous Studios ==
By 1961, Post was drawing the adventures of Harvey Comics’ characters as Hot Stuff the Little Devil, Spooky the Tuff Little Ghost, Wendy the Good Little Witch, and the Ghostly Trio in comic books like Casper's Ghostland and TV Casper & Company, starring Casper the Friendly Ghost. Post was the head of Paramount Cartoon Studios, as well as a key director, succeeding Seymour Kneitel from 1964 through 1965.

He later went up to director and writer position at Famous Studios, and created and designed a character named Honey Halfwitch (voiced by Shari Lewis), who is half-wizard, half-girl. Post pitched the character to the highest brass at Paramount. In June 1966, Shamus Culhane, the penultimate head of Famous Studios, took over the series, and the character was given a new design and voice in the last 4 cartoons. The final cartoon, Brother Bat, was the last cartoon with Post's involvement as a writer, which was released in August of 1967, four months before the studio shut down.

== Anthro ==
In the late 1960s, Howie Post created, wrote, and drew the prehistoric-teen comic book Anthro for DC Comics, which ran six issues (Aug. 1968 - Aug. 1969) after debuting in Showcase, with the last issue in the series inked by Wally Wood and Ralph Reese.

== The Dropouts ==
Howard Post's The Dropouts (July 20, 1970)

The Dropouts was a comic strip created by Post and was syndicated by United Features Syndicate from 1968 to 1981. Post began the strip at the same time his comic book Anthro was canceled. The premise of The Dropouts was a variation on the "stranded on a desert island" gag. The two main characters, Alf and Sandy, were indeed castaways, but the island is hardly deserted: One of the strip's running gags was how closely the natives' society resembled Western civilization. Other characters, all natives, included a one-man police force, a doctor, and a chef running a cafe with inedible food. There were other Western characters, including a religious zealot, an angry feminist, and a disheveled alcoholic, Chugalug.

== Later life and career ==
In the mid-to-late 1980s, Post drew for the Star imprint of Marvel Comics, on titles such as Heathcliff and Care Bears. He was also an editor on Looney Tunes Magazine and Tiny Toons Magazine for DC Comics. In later years, Post taught art and illustration privately and at New York's School of Visual Arts.

A long-time resident of Leonia, New Jersey, he was survived by his companion of 24 years, Pamela Rutt, and two daughters, Andee Post and Glynnis Doda. His wife Bobbee preceded him in 1980.
