= Anthro =

Anthro may refer to:

- Anthropo-, a prefix meaning human, humanoid, or human-like
- Anthropology, the scientific study of humanity
- Anthropomorphism, the attribution of human traits, emotions, or intentions to non-human entities
- Anthroposophy, a spiritualist movement
- Anthro (comics), a DC Comics caveman
- A term used in digital art communities and most notably, the furry fandom.
