= Bat Lash =

Fictional character in DC Comics

- Cover to Bat Lash #3 (Feb./Mar. 1969), art by Nick Cardy.

Publication information
- Publisher: DC Comics
- First appearance: Showcase #76 (August 1968)
- Created by: Joe Orlando; Carmine Infantino; Sheldon Mayer; Sergio Aragonés

In-story information
- Full name: Bartholomew Aloysius Lash
- Team affiliations: Rough Bunch; Black Lantern Corps; Justice Riders
- Abilities: Great marksman
Bat Lash
Publication information
- Publisher: DC Comics
- Schedule: Bimonthly
- Format: (vol. 1): ongoing series (vol. 2): limited series
- Genre: Western
- Publication date: Oct./Nov. 1968 – July 2008
- No. of issues: (vol. 1): 7 (vol. 2): 6
- Main character: Bat Lash
Creative team as of 1968–1969
- Written by: (vol. 1); Sheldon Mayer; Sergio Aragonés; Dennis O'Neil (vol. 2); Peter Brandvold; Sergio Aragonés
- Artist(s): (vol. 1); Nick Cardy (vol. 2); John Severin; Javier Pina
- Colorist(s): (vol. 2); Steve Buccellato
Collected editions
- Showcase Presents: Bat Lash: ISBN 1-4012-2295-1

Bartholomew Aloysius "Bat" Lash is a fictional Western superhero character in the DC Universe. A self-professed pacifist, ladies' man, and gambler, Bat Lash's adventures have been published by DC Comics since 1968.

== Character origin ==
In 1968, Carmine Infantino, newly installed editorial director of DC Comics, and his editor, Joe Orlando, came up with the name and basic premise of the loner whose family had been wiped out by murderous thugs, and then brought in Sheldon Mayer (former DC editor and creator of Sugar and Spike) and Sergio Aragonés (an artist best known for his comedic illustrations in Mad magazine) to further flesh out the concept.

Mayer wrote the first appearance (Showcase #76, August 1968). Infantino claimed to have greatly rewritten it. The assignment was then handed to Aragonés, with Denny O'Neil doing the dialog over Aragonés' plots, and Nick Cardy providing the art. Issues were produced in a variation of the full script method. First, Aragonés would create a plot in thumbnail sketch form, then O'Neil would write the dialog, and last came Cardy's finished art.

== Publication history ==
Bat Lash first appeared in 1968, in a house ad running in Superman DC Comics. It featured a gangly figure, in silhouette, stalking toward the reader, with the tagline: "Bat Lash. Will he save the West, or ruin it?".

The character's first published story appeared in Showcase #76. It featured a devil-may-care character, a peaceful, violence-hating man who attracts trouble wherever he goes. Dialoguer Denny O'Neil summarized that, "he was a charming anti-hero, or as close to a charming anti-hero as comics ever came—at least as we did him. In subsequent handlings Bat Lash became a churlish anti-hero. Sergio [Aragonés] and I tried to make him in the tradition of the charming rogue. Bat had a conscience represented by the flower in his hat which he inevitably threw away whenever he was doing something ratty" [emphasis in original].

Bat Lash's own series only lasted seven issues. Even though editorial director Carmine Infantino claimed it sold well in Europe, sales in the States were not enough to sustain a run of the title. O'Neil questioned this, remarking that low sales was "always" the reason given for cancellation in those days, and that he had reason to believe that this was not the case with Bat Lash. The character and the series bearing his name have been recognized in the industry, including the 1968 and 1969 Alley Awards for Best Western Titles.

Bat Lash made several other appearances after his cancellation in issues of Weird Western Tales and other titles. He had a story in DC Special Series #16 and a brief backup series in Jonah Hex #49 & 51–52 in 1981. In the 1989/90 miniseries Time Masters Bat Lash makes a brief appearance along with Jonah Hex. He appears in an alternate time-line in Justice League Europe Annual #2, written in 1991. An older Crimson Fox, through a time travel accident, appears in the middle of a card game, allowing Bat Lash the opportunity to save himself (and her) from Bat's own cheating. During the chase, Bat encounters one "Miss Sally", who is sad that she has not seen Bat in months.

A 1998 miniseries, "Guns of the Dragon" set in 1927 China, teams an elderly Bat Lash with Biff Bradley and Enemy Ace on an adventure that sends them to Dinosaur Island.

In 2006, writers Jimmy Palmiotti and Justin Gray wrote Lash into Jonah Hex #3. For Halloween in 2007 Bat Lash works with Jonah Hex to save Lazarus Lane in Jonah Hex #24. He also appears in Jonah Hex #70.

In 2008, Bat Lash appeared in a self-titled, six issue miniseries from DC, written by Aragones, with dialog by acclaimed western novelist Peter Brandvold, art by John Severin and covers by Walt Simonson. It was reprinted in trade paperback as Bat Lash: Guns and Roses in 2008.

In Blackest Night, Bat Lash is temporarily resurrected as a Black Lantern alongside Jonah Hex and Scalphunter.

Bat Lash is one of six DC heroes featured in Walt Simonson's 2012 graphic novel The Judas Coin.

During the Dark Nights: Death Metal storyline, Bat Lash is among the superheroes revived by Batman using a Black Lantern ring.

== In other media ==
=== Television ===
Bat Lash appears in the Justice League Unlimited episode "The Once and Future Thing, Part One: Weird Western Tales", voiced by Ben Browder.

=== Film ===
- An illusionary Bat Lash appears in Justice League: Warworld, voiced by Brett Dalton.
- Bat Lash appears in Justice League: Crisis on Infinite Earths, voiced again by Brett Dalton.

=== Video games ===
Bat Lash appears as a character summon in Scribblenauts Unmasked: A DC Comics Adventure.

=== Miscellaneous ===
- Bat Lash's popularity was discussed on Conan during an interview between Conan O'Brien and Peter Girardi, creative director of Warner Bros. Animation, in regards to DC characters that "sucked".
- Bat Lash's alien abduction in Crisis on Infinite Earths #3 is adapted into "Westerner", a 2012 song by electro-rock band Judge Rock.
