= World of Krypton =

DC Comics Limited series

- World of Krypton #1 (July 1979), artwork by Ross Andru and Dick Giordano.

Publication information
- Publisher: DC Comics
- Schedule: Monthly
- Format: standard
- Publication date: July – September 1979
- No. of issues: 3
- Main character: Jor-El

Creative team
- Written by: Paul Kupperberg
- Penciller: Howard Chaykin
- Inker(s): Murphy Anderson, Frank Chiaramonte
- Letterer(s): Ben Oda, Shelly Leferman
- Colorist(s): Adrienne Roy, Jerry Serpe
- Editor: E. Nelson Bridwell

Collected editions
- Superman: The Many Worlds of Krypton: ISBN 978-1401278892

World of Krypton is an American three-issue comic book limited series written by Paul Kupperberg and penciled by Howard Chaykin. It was the comics industry's first limited series, which addressed DC's problem of newly launched ongoing series too often fizzling out within 10 issues. World of Krypton was published by DC Comics from July to September 1979.

Taking place in the Bronze Age era of DC Comics history, the series explores Superman's home world of Krypton. The story details his father Jor-El's life, the launch of the rocket that carried Kal-El to Earth, and the destruction of the planet.

== Background and creation ==
"The Fabulous World of Krypton" had been a recurring back-up feature in Superman and other titles since the early 1970s. The feature was created by E. Nelson Bridwell and many stories were written by Cary Bates.

The stories comprising World of Krypton were originally scheduled to be published in Showcase #104–106 to coincide with the premiere of the 1978 film Superman: The Movie. Those issues would have had cover-dates of September–November 1978. When the film's release date was delayed (with it eventually coming out in December 1978), the stories were rescheduled for Showcase issues #110–112 (cover dates April–May 1979). In the meantime, however, the Showcase title was canceled as part of the so-called "DC Implosion".

At that point, the storyline was revised and released as World of Krypton — comics' first ever limited series.

Bridwell commissioned the project. Paul Kupperberg, a regular contributor to Showcase at the time of the story's conception, wrote the storyline. His brother Alan Kupperberg did uncredited layouts, upon which Chaykin expanded.

== Plot ==
World of Krypton provides a great amount of detail into Krypton's history just before its destruction, along with the life story of Jor-El, the world's leading scientist, and his wife Lara Lor-Van. Superman himself appears in framing sequences, as do notable Kryptonians such as General Zod, Jax-Ur, Faora Hu-Ul, Lar Gand, and Beppo, as well as Clark Kent's adoptive parents Jonathan and Martha Kent.

The individual issues were titled, "The Jor-El Story", "This Planet Is Doomed!", and "The Last Days of Krypton", respectively.

== Reception and legacy ==
World of Krypton's reception was positive, leading to subsequent similar titles and later more ambitious productions such as Camelot 3000 for the direct market in 1982.

World of Krypton was reprinted and translated on a number of occasions. It was republished, in part or in whole, in Superman the Comic #2 (K.G. Murray Publishing Company, 1978), The Best of DC #5 (May-June 1980), and Tor Books' World of Krypton (June 1982). It has been translated into German, French, Swedish, Norwegian, Portuguese, and Italian.

DC published another World of Krypton miniseries from December 1987 to March 1988. Produced after the retcon events of Crisis on Infinite Earths, Krypton itself was the main subject of the latter The World of Krypton miniseries. Written by John Byrne and illustrated by Mike Mignola, it fills in much of Krypton's new history.

A third miniseries named World of Krypton was published from February to July 2022. Written by Robert Venditti with art by Michael Avon Oeming, it tells Krypton's history in the post-Flashpoint universe.

== Collected editions ==
In 2018, DC published the trade paperback Superman: The Many Worlds of Krypton, which collected both World of Krypton miniseries as well as stories from Superman #233, 236, 238, 240, 248, 257, 266, and The Superman Family #182.
