= Angel and the Ape =

Humor comic book series

- Angel and the Ape's first appearance in Showcase #77 (December 1968). Pencils by Bob Oksner, inks by Tex Blaisdell.

Publication information
- Publisher: (vol. 1–2); DC Comics (vol. 3); Vertigo Comics
- Schedule: Bi-monthly
- Format: (vol. 1); Ongoing series (vol. 2–3); Limited series
- Publication date: (vol. 1); November 1968-September 1969 (vol. 2); March–June 1991 (vol. 3); October 2001-January 2002
- No. of issues: (vol. 1): 7 (vol. 2–3): 4 each
- Main character(s): Angel O'Day; Sam Simeon

Creative team
- Created by: E. Nelson Bridwell & Bob Oksner
- Written by: (vol. 1); E. Nelson Bridwell (vol. 2); Phil Foglio (vol. 3); Howard Chaykin and David Tischman
- Artist(s): (vol. 1); Bob Oksner (vol. 2); Phil Foglio (vol. 3); Philip Bond
- Inker(s): (vol. 1); Wally Wood
- Colorist(s): (vol. 2); Tom Ziuko

Angel and the Ape is a humor comic book created by E. Nelson Bridwell and Bob Oksner published by DC Comics. The characters first appeared in 1968 in Showcase #77 then graduated to their own title, with art by comic artist Bob Oksner, most often inked by Wally Wood. The title lasted for seven issues, being renamed to Meet Angel for its final appearance.

== Series overview ==
Angel O'Day is a private investigator who manages the O'Day and Simeon Detective Agency with her partner Sam Simeon. Sam differs from many stereotypical detectives; besides helping Angel, Sam is a comic book artist and a talking gorilla. Sam's name is a pun on the word "simian" and the San Simeon estate of publisher William Randolph Hearst. In the first few stories, Sam draws comics for self-obsessed editor Stan Bragg and his rival Morton Stoops.

=== Revivals ===
The series has been revived twice. The first was by Phil Foglio in the 1990s. In Phil Foglio's 1991 miniseries, Angel is revealed to be the half-sister of Dumb Bunny, a member of the Inferior Five (also created by Bridwell), while Sam is depicted as the grandson of Gorilla Grodd. Sam has mental powers that he can use to make himself be perceived as a human. This is in contrast to the original series, wherein people see Sam's true form but convince themselves he is an unusually ape-like human, since it is "impossible" for there to be such a thing as a talking gorilla.

A second miniseries was released in 2001 under the Vertigo Comics imprint. It was written by Howard Chaykin and David Tischman, with art by Philip Bond and covers by Arthur Adams.

The two appear in a one-page story in DC Holiday Special '09, written and drawn by Andrew Pepoy.

In The New 52 continuity reboot, Angel O'Day and Sam Simeon are human A.R.G.U.S. scientists and colleagues. Simeon is transformed into a gorilla following an accident involving gorilla DNA from Gorilla City.

== In other media ==
- Angel O'Day appears in the Young Justice episode "Influence", voiced by Danica McKellar.
  - Sam Simeon appears in the series' tie-in comic as the son of Gorilla Grodd and Primat.
- Angel O'Day appears as a character summon in Scribblenauts Unmasked: A DC Comics Adventure.
