= Paul Kupperberg =

American comic writer

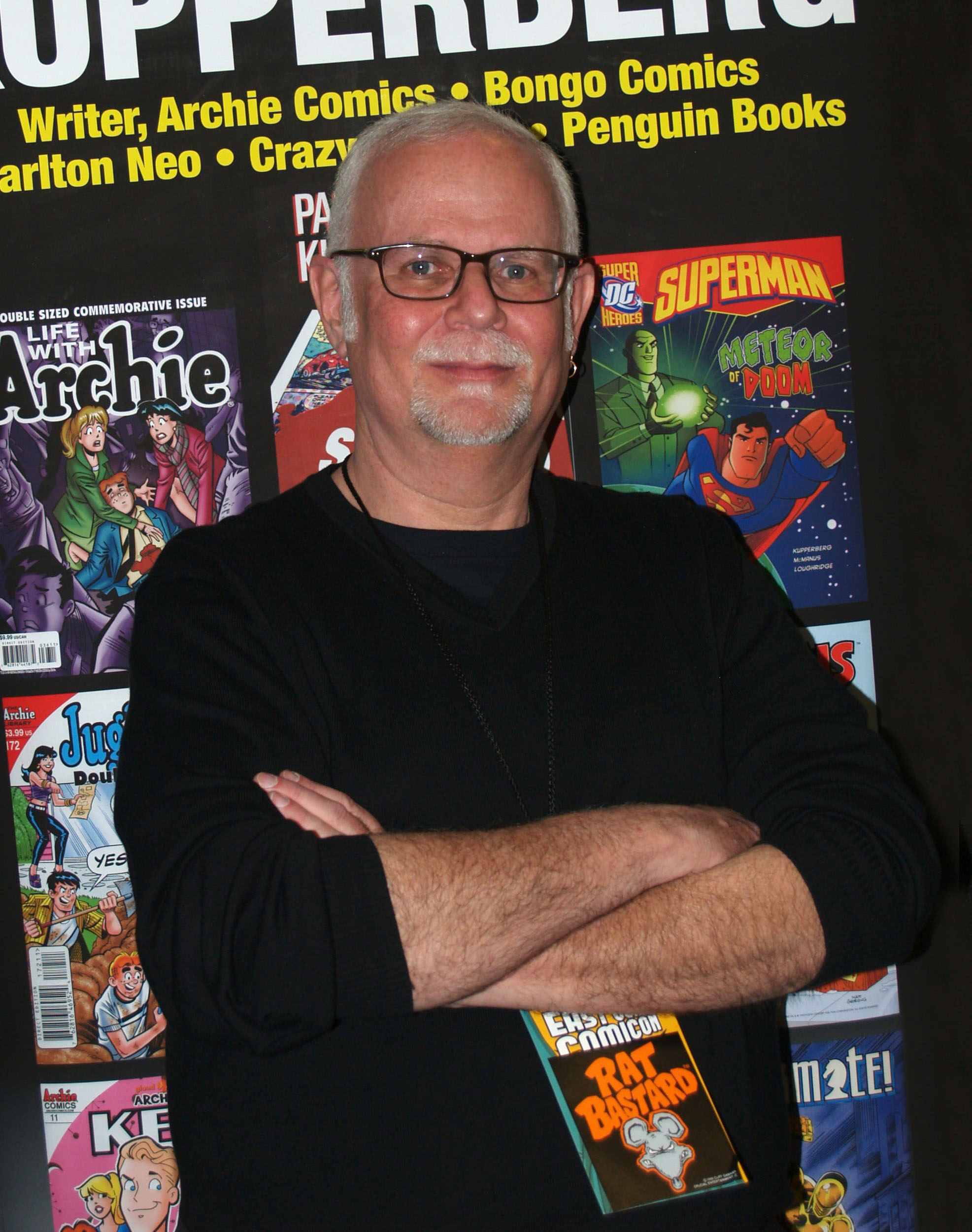
- Kupperberg at the 2015 East Coast Comicon in Secaucus, New Jersey
- Born: June 14, 1955 (age 71) New York City, U.S.
- Areas: Writer, Editor
- Notable works: Vigilante; Aquaman; Supergirl

Paul Kupperberg (/ˈkʌpərbɜːrɡ/; born June 14, 1955) is an American writer and comics editor. He is currently a writer and executive editor at Charlton Neo Comics and Pix-C Webcomics, and a contributing author with Crazy 8 Press. Formerly, he was an editor for DC Comics and executive editor of Weekly World News, as well as a writer of novels, comic books, and newspaper strips.

== Early life ==
Paul Kupperberg was born in Brooklyn, New York City.

== Career ==
Kupperberg entered the comics field from comics fandom. He and Paul Levitz produced the comics fanzine The Comic Reader between 1971 and 1973, and Etcetera between 1972–1973.

=== Comics ===
Kupperberg has written an estimated 1,000 comic book stories, primarily at DC, for the Julius Schwartz-edited Superman, Action Comics, Supergirl, and Superboy titles, as well as the new Doom Patrol, Vigilante, Green Lantern, The Brave and the Bold, Showcase, The Superman Family, House of Mystery, Weird War Tales, Justice League of America, Ghosts, Star Trek, Aquaman, Adventure Comics, The Savage Sword of Conan, and many others. He and artist Jan Duursema co-created the Arion character in The Warlord #55 (March 1982) and the Arion, Lord of Atlantis series was launched in November 1982. That same month saw the debut of The Daring New Adventures of Supergirl by Kupperberg and Carmine Infantino. Kupperberg scripted the first appearance of Keith Giffen's Ambush Bug character in DC Comics Presents #52 (Dec. 1982) A revival of the Doom Patrol series by Kupperberg and Steve Lightle began in October 1987 and Kupperberg and Steve Erwin launched the Checkmate! series six months later. Kupperberg created the Takion series as well. He wrote the syndicated The World's Greatest Superheroes newspaper comic strip with José Delbo from 1981–1985 and the Tom and Jerry newspaper strip from 1990–1991.

Kupperberg wrote the first comic book miniseries, World of Krypton in 1979 and co-wrote Secrets of the Legion of Super-Heroes the following year with E. Nelson Bridwell. Kupperberg was one of the contributors to the DC Challenge limited series in 1986 and his other mini-series include The Phantom Stranger (with Mike Mignola and P. Craig Russell), Power Girl, Peacemaker, Super Powers (with Jack Kirby), and the first comic book adaptation of He-Man and the Masters of the Universe. He has also written movie parodies and humor for Marvel's Crazy Magazine (1977–1983), the series "Trash" for Britain's 2000 AD, with artist Nigel Dobbyn, and The Online Multipath Adventures of Superman web-animation (1998). Most of his current comic book writing appears in the DC-published Cartoon Network licensed comics on such characters as Johnny Bravo, I.M. Weasel, Hi Hi Puffy AmiYumi, and Scooby-Doo.

=== Prose ===
Kupperberg's prose credits include The Atlas to the DC Universe (Mayfair Games, 1992), The Doom Patrol Sourcebook (Mayfair Games, 1993), and the Spider-Man novels Crime Campaign and Murdermoon (both Pocket Books, 1979). He has had short stories published in the anthologies The Further Adventures of Batman Featuring Catwoman (Bantam Books, 1993), Fear Itself (Warner Books, 1995), Superheroes (Ace Books, 1995, edited by John Varley) and Oceans of Magic (DAW Books, 2001). His adult novel, JSA: Ragnarok, was scheduled to be published in 2006 but was delayed due to the bankruptcy of its publisher, iBooks. It was published in November 2020 by Crazy 8 Press.

His other published work includes the young adult novel Wishbone Mysteries: The Sirian Conspiracy (co-written with Michael Jan Friedman, Big Red Chair Books, 1999), as well as color and activity books featuring Firehouse Tales. In 2005, Kupperberg began writing for the weekly satiric and humor tabloid, Weekly World News.

=== Magazine work ===
From 1981 to 1982, Kupperberg was assistant editor on Video Action Magazine, one of the first newsstand magazines to focus on the then-burgeoning home video market. He also wrote numerous articles for the magazine. Among his other non-fiction work are many introductions and historic prefaces to various DC collected editions and Archives ('The Essential Showcase', The Flash Archives Volume 1, Action Comics Archives Volume 2, etc.), as well as essays for the anthology You Did What?: Mad Plans And Great Historical Disasters (Harper Paperbacks, 2004). Since 2003, Kupperberg has written numerous non-fiction books for young adults, including: Spy Satellites, The Tragedy Of The Titanic, Astronaut Biographies: John Glenn (a Society Of School Librarians International Honor Book, 2004), Critical Perspectives On The Great Depression, The Nature Of Disease, Edwin Hubble And The Big Bang, The History Of The New York Colony, Rodeo Clowns, Origins Of The Action Heroes: Spider-Man, Cutting Edge Careers In Robotics, and In The News: Hurricanes for Rosen Publishing.

=== DC editing career ===
From 1991–2006, Kupperberg was on staff at DC Comics, editing such titles as The Flash, Wonder Woman, Jack Kirby's Fourth World, Impulse, Peter Cannon, Thunderbolt and others. He also edited in DC's Licensed Publishing department, overseeing such titles as MADvertising: A MAD Look at 50 Years of MADison Avenue by David Shayne, Marv Wolfman's novelization of his landmark comics series Crisis on Infinite Earths, a trilogy of Green Lantern novels by Christopher Priest, Mike Baron and Mike Ahn (both novel and trilogy were published by iBooks), and dozens of MAD reprints, kids storybooks, young adult novels and children's color and activity books based on DC Comics properties.

=== 2006–present ===
In early 2006, Kupperberg left DC to become senior editor at the Weekly World News. In 2007, he contributed to the Doctor Who short-story collection Short Trips: Destination Prague, and The Avenger Chronicles from Moonstone Books. The Weekly World News ceased publication in August 2007, and in January 2008, Kupperberg became senior editor of WWE KIDS for World Wrestling Entertainment. He is freelancing and consulting for DC Comics, Archie Comics, Moonstone Publishing, Stone Arch Books, Bongo Comics, GIT Corp, and others.

He wrote the Harvey Award and Eisner Award nominated Life with Archie series for Archie Comics which began in August 2010 in the second issue of Life With Archie: The Married Life, in magazine format. The series continues the Michael Uslan/Stan Goldberg best-selling Archie wedding series, two ongoing series each featuring one of Archie's two possible futures, one married to Betty Cooper and another married to Veronica Lodge. The series also featured the controversial gay marriage of Kevin Keller (the first gay character in the Archie Comics Universe) and ended with the 2014 "The Death of Archie" storyline, which made news all over the world. He wrote the young adult novel Kevin (Penguin Books), which was nominated for a GLAAD Media Award and won the 2014 Scribe Award from the International Association of Media Tir-In Writers. He has written Captain Action Classified, children's books based on Superman, Batman, and Wonder Woman for Stone Arch Books, and numerous color and activity books based on DreamWorks properties for Dalmatian Press, as well as Mad Libs featuring Archie, DC Superheroes, and Marvel Superheroes.

Kupperberg is currently executive editor of Charlton Neo and the online webcomics site, Pix-C, for which he has created numerous titles and features, including Paul Kupperberg's Secret Romances, Unusual Tales featuring N.E.O., "The Scarry Squad," "Edison Corliss' Industrial Steam and Ironworks," "Digger Graves, Paranormal P.I.," and "Blank."

He is also one of the seven authors behind Crazy 8 Press, a publishing hub and imprint with Robert Greenberger, Michael Jan Friedman, Aaron Rosenberg, Peter David, and others through which he has published his novel The Same Old Story and the short story collection, In My Shorts: Hitler's Bellhop and Other Stories as well as contributing to such Crazy 8 anthologies as [ReDeus, co-created with Greenberger and Rosenberg, Pangaea, and Tales of the Crimson Keep.

== Personal life ==
Kupperberg's brother, Alan Kupperberg (1953–2015), also worked in the comic book field as an artist and writer.

== Bibliography ==
=== Prose fiction ===
- The Amazing Spider-Man: Crime Campaign (Pocket Books, 1979)
- The Hulk and Spider-Man: Murdermoon (Pocket Books, 1979)
- "Creature of Habit," in The Further Adventures of Batman: Featuring Catwoman (Bantam Books, 1993)
- "Food for the Beast," in Fear Itself (Warner Books, 1995)
- "Reflected Glory," in Superheroes (Ace Books, 1995)
- Wishbone Mysteries: The Sirian Conspiracy (Big Red Chair Books, 1999)
- "Walk Upon the Waters," in Oceans of Magic (DAW Books, 2001)
- The Powerpuff Girls: Buttercup’s Terrible Temper Tantrums (Scholastic Books, 2002)
- "Sargasso Sector," in Star Trek Corps Of Engineers: Grand Design (Simon & Schuster, 2007)
- "Strange Attractor," in Doctor Who, Short Trips: Destination Prague (Big Finish Books, 2007)
- "The Cloud of Doom," in The Avenger Chronicles (Moonstone Books, 2008)
- "Man Bites Dog," in Vampires (Moonstone Books, 2009)
- Jew-Jitsu: The Hebrew Hands Of Fury (Citadel Books, November 2008)
- JSA: Ragnarok Book 1 (of 3) (DC Comics publishing partner, forthcoming)
- Hey, Sophie! (publication TBD)

=== Non-fiction ===
- DC Comics — introductions and historic forewords for collected editions of classic comic books, including Action Comics Archive Vol. 2, The Flash Archives Vol. 1, Challengers of The Unknown Archives Vol. 1, Superman: Whatever Happened To The Man Of Tomorrow?, The Essential Showcase, The Doom Patrol Archives Col. 3, Superman: The World Of Krypton, and Superman: The Bottle City Of Kandor.
- Spy Satellites (Rosen Publishing, 2003)
- The Tragedy of the Titanic (Rosen Publishing, 2003)
- You Did What?: Mad Plans and Great Historical Disasters (Harper Paperbacks, 2004)
- Astronaut Biographies: John Glenn (Rosen Publishing, 2004 — Society of School Librarians International Honor Book, 2004)
- Critical Perspectives On The Great Depression (Rosen Publishing, 2005)
- The Nature of Disease (Rosen Publishing, 2005)
- Edwin Hubble and the Big Bang (Rosen Publishing, 2005)
- The History of the New York Colony (Rosen Publishing, 2005)
- Rodeo Clowns (Rosen Publishing, 2006)
- Origins of the Action Heroes: Spider-Man (Rosen Publishing, 2006)
- Cutting Edge Careers in Robotics (Rosen Publishing, 2007)
- In the News: Hurricanes (Rosen Publishing, 2007)
- Great Historic Disasters: The Influenza Pandemic of 1918–1919 (Facts On File, 2008)
- Building America, Then and Now: The Alaska Highway (Facts On File, 2008)

=== Syndicated newspaper strips ===
- Tom and Jerry – syndicated newspaper strip (Editors Press Service, 1990–1991)
- The World's Greatest Superheroes Presents Superman (Tribune Company, 1981–1985)

=== Comic books ===
==== DC Comics ====
- Action Comics #536, 547, 555, 557–561, 564, 569–570, 580, 598 (1982–1988)
- Action Comics Weekly #610, 613–614, 617, 623, 631–634, 636, 641 (Phantom Stranger) (1988–1989)
- Adventure Comics #453–455, 460–463 (1977–1979)
- All-Star Squadron #41, 44 (1985)
- Aquaman #58–60, 62–63 (1977–1978)
- Arak, Son of Thunder #15 (1982)
- Arion the Immortal #1–6 (1992)
- Arion, Lord of Atlantis #1–3, 12–35, Special #1 (1982–1985)
- Atari Force vol. 2 #13, Special #1 (1985–1986)
- Batman #352 (1982)
- Batman: Gotham Knights #29 (2002)
- The Brave and the Bold #163, 175 (1980–1981)
- Cartoon Cartoons #1–2, 4, 9, 19, 22 (2001–2003)
- Cartoon Network Block Party #10, 25, 32, 45, 52 (2005–2009)
- Cartoon Network Starring #2–3, 6–8, 10–11, 13–14, 16–17 (1999–2001)
- Checkmate #1–33 (1988–1991)
- Crusaders #5–7 (1992)
- Daring New Adventures of Supergirl #1–13 (1982–1983)
- DC Challenge #7 (1986)
- DC Comics Presents #47, 49, 52, 54, 56, 65, 70, 72, 75, 79, 80, 86, 90, 93 (1982–1986)
- DC Science Fiction Graphic Novel #6 ("The Magic Goes Away") (1987)
- DC Special Series #1 (1977)
- DC Super Stars #14 (1977)
- Detective Comics #485, 489, 504, 516, 519 (1979–1982)
- Doom Patrol vol. 2 #1–18, Annual #1 (1987–1989)
- Doom Patrol and Suicide Squad #1 (1988)
- Dragonlance #33–34 (1991)
- The Flash #265–266 (1978)
- Flintstones and the Jetsons #19–20 (1999)
- Funny Stuff Stocking Stuffer #1 (1985)
- Fury of Firestorm #27, 54 (1984–1986)
- Ghosts #95–99, 101–102 (1980–1981)
- Green Lantern #132, 148–149, 151–158, 181, 187 (1980–1985)
- Green Lantern Corps Annual #1–2 (1985–1986)
- Gross Point #6 (1997)
- Gunfire #9 (1995)
- Hawkman vol. 3 #7–8 (1994)
- Heroes Against Hunger #1 (1986)
- House of Mystery #252, 273, 285, 294, 296 (1977–1981)
- Justice League of America #182, 217 (1980–1983)
- Justice League Quarterly #6–7, 9, 13–14, 16–17 (1992–1994)
- Legion of Super-Heroes vol. 2 #267 (1980)
- Martian Manhunter Special #1 (1996)
- Masters of the Universe #1–3 (1982–1983)
- Men of War #17–18, 24–25 (1979–1980)
- New Adventures of Superboy #36–50, 52–54 (1982–1984)
- Peacemaker #–4 (1988)
- Phantom Stranger vol. 3 #1–4 (1987–1988)
- Power Girl #1–4 (1988)
- Scooby-Doo #128, 143, 149–150, 153–157, 159 (2008–2010)
- Scooby-Doo, Where Are You? #14–15 (2011–2012)
- Secret Origins vol. 2 #11, Annual #1 (1987)
- Secrets of Haunted House #30, 46 (1980–1982)
- Secrets of the Legion of Super-Heroes #1–3 (1981)
- Showcase #94–96, 100 (1977–1978)
- Showcase '95 #7 (1995)
- Star Trek #18, 30 (1985–1986)
- Sun Devils #7 (1985)
- Superboy vol. 3 #17–18 (1991)
- Superboy and the Legion of Super-Heroes #236, 240–242, 249 (1978–1979)
- Supergirl vol. 2 #14–23 (1983–1984)
- Superman #376–378, 387, 389, 397–399, 403–404, 406, 408 (1982–1985)
- The Superman Family #182–194, 215–222 (1977–1982)
- Superman: "The Computer Masters of Metropolis" (1982)
- Superman Through the Ages #1 (2007)
- Super Powers vol. 2 #1–6 (1985–1986)
- Super Powers vol. 3 #1–4 (1986)
- Takion #1–7 (1996)
- Teen Titans Spotlight #9 (1987)
- Time Warp #5 (1980)
- Underworld Unleashed: Apokolips - Dark Uprising #1 (1995)
- V #17–18 (1986)
- Vigilante #16, 19–50, Annual #1–2 (1985–1988)
- The Warlord #55–62 (1982)
- Web #13–14 (1992)
- Weird War Tales #53, 65, 68, 74–76, 80–81, 83–84, 91, 98 (1977–1981)
- Wonder Woman #258, 290 (1979–1982)
- World of Krypton #1–3 (1979)
- World's Finest Comics #257, 275–278 (1979–1982)

==== First Comics ====
- E-Man vol. 2 #8, 10–11 (1983–1984)

==== Marvel Comics ====
- Captain America #240 (1979)
- Crazy Magazine #68–69, 75, 77–79, 81 (1980–1981)
- Savage Sword of Conan #181 (1991)

==== Miscellaneous ====
- The Multi-Path Adventures of Superman: Bizarro — six-part animated series for the Internet (BDE, 1998)
- Specialty advertising and custom comic books for clients including Radio Shack, Power Tool Institute, Bariatric Health Institute, Silly Putty, Mattel Toys, Fruit-of-the-Loom, NASCAR, Schering-Plough Pharmaceutical
- Role playing game manuals for Mayfair Games
- Color and activity books for Scholastic, Simon Scribbles (Simon & Schuster), Dalmatian Publishing, Meredith Books

=== Magazines ===
- Video Action Magazine — Various articles on topics including emerging video technology, hardware, legal issues and reviews (1980–1981)
- Crazy Magazine — Movie parodies and humor articles (Marvel Comics, 1977–1983)
- Weekly World News — Satiric and humorous articles on politics and social issues for weekly tabloid
- WWE Kids Magazine — Wrote articles, comic strips and features for World Wrestling Entertainment’s magazine for children (2008)

Preceded by Bob Rozakis	The New Adventures of Superboy writer 1982–1984	Succeeded by n/a
Preceded by Marv Wolfman	Vigilante writer 1985–1988	Succeeded by n/a
Preceded by n/a	Doom Patrol vol. 2 writer 1987–1989	Succeeded by Grant Morrison
