= Brother Power the Geek =

Publication information
- Publisher: DC Comics/Vertigo
- First appearance: Brother Power the Geek #1 (October 1968)
- Created by: Joe Simon

In-story information
- Alter ego: Brother Power
- Team affiliations: Love Syndicate of Dreamworld
- Abilities: Puppet Elemental: Inhuman strength and vitality; Extremely flexible and durable artificial body; Electricity absorption; Above average intelligence; Vertigo: Enhanced physical abilities; Can possess any artificial figure resembling a human being; Size manipulation

Brother Power the Geek is a comic book character created in the late 1960s for DC Comics by Joe Simon. He first appeared in Brother Power the Geek #1 (October 1968).

The concept behind Brother Power was derived heavily from Mary Shelley's Frankenstein. At the same time, Simon was also attempting to capture the sort of "wandering outcast philosopher" characterization that made Marvel Comics' Silver Surfer a cult hit among the college student readers of the period.

According to Scott Shaw, the character was originally supposed to be called The Freak, but was renamed to The Geek due to concerns by DC Comics management over the possible drug reference "freak" implied at the time.

The original series lasted only two issues.

== Original appearance ==
Brother Power was originally a rag doll-like mannequin left in an empty abandoned tailor's shop that hippies Nick Cranston and Paul Cymbalist were squatting in.

After being been attacked by brutish biker gang leader Hound Dawg and his fellow war hawks the Mongrels, they dressed up the stuffed cloth dummy with its bendable wire skeleton and shaggy mop-like hair in Paul's wet and bloodied "hip threads" to keep them from shrinking. Forgotten for months by the radiator and absorbing the sun and rain from an open window and various spilled chemicals, it was eventually struck by lightning and brought to life.

Much like Frankenstein's Monster, the character is portrayed as grotesque but good-natured, with a mind eager to learn and incredible strength, and it was the latter quality that led Nick and Paul to dub him "Brother Power".

Nicknamed "Pow" for short, he learned how to talk and read and write and quickly adapted to the laidback peace-loving flower child lifestyle and groovy lingo, using his powers to protect his friends from biker attacks and otherwise help those around him, leaping from rooftop to rooftop like some far out cross between Spider-Man and the Scarecrow from Wizard of Oz.

Shortly after his creation however Brother Power was kidnapped by the "Psychedelic Circus" who chained him up and forced him to act as a geek in a freak show alongside other weird creatures who were based on the styles of Ed Roth and Harvey Kurtzman, artists who were friends of Joe Simon.

After he escaped, a hippie girl named Cindy repaired his rag-stuffed body. She then painted a more attractive doll-like face over his rudimentary features and gave him his signature orange turtleneck sweater with a blue flower symbol on the front.

Inspired by her kindness, he decided he needed to do more for his community and attempted to run for the United States Congress.

His misadventures with the establishment led to finding work and encouraging other hippies to do so, eventually getting hired by the J.P. Acme Corporation just as it was taken over by the wicked Lord Sliderule. Brother Power's ingenuity still made the assembly line run more efficiently.

Brother Power was last seen being shot into space on orders from Governor Ronald Reagan after trying to prevent the sabotage of a rocket launch by Hound Dawg and his gang, knowing it would be blamed on hippies.

While sales of the title were modest, Brother Power was not popular among the staff. Former DC Comics editorial director Carmine Infantino claimed in several interviews following his retirement from comics that Superman editor Mort Weisinger disliked the character and had petitioned DC publisher Jack Liebowitz to shut down the title.

According to Infantino, Weisinger admitted a dislike for the hippie subculture of the 1960s, and felt that Joe Simon portrayed them too sympathetically. It did not help that Hound Dawg and his cronies appeared with uniforms and gadgetry evocative of Nazis in the second issue.

According to Simon, the third issue was canceled just before the finished artwork was to be set up for print duplication, and Simon would neither discuss the plot of this issue nor release any of the original art.

Despite Weisinger's concerns over the hippie subculture and the level of drug abuse it represented, drug, substance and alcohol intake are not depicted.

Simon was not the artist on the title's two issues. The artwork was by Al Bare, who had been working with Simon at Sick. Simon had hired Bare to "ghost" the art, and was subsequently credited with the art.

== Later appearances ==
The character was revived briefly two decades later, first in a short story by Neil Gaiman in Swamp Thing Annual #5 (1989) (reprinted in Neil Gaiman's Midnight Days), and then in a Vertigo one-shot by Rachel Pollack and Mike Allred titled Vertigo Visions - The Geek.

In Gaiman's story, Brother Power is revealed to be an imperfect elemental, similar to Swamp Thing, and he is connected to all human simulacra such as dolls, dummies, statues, etc. The story resumes with the rocket's return to Earth, guided into Tampa Bay by Firestorm after an unsuccessful attempt to destroy it. His newfound ability to change his size leads to a call to Batman, who defers to Abigail Cable. Ultimately, an aging hippie named Chester calms him down.

Pollack's story featured a brief return of Brother Power's adversary, Lord Sliderule, now in a business suit, and depicted Brother Power being forced to perform as a circus geek, eating live animals for the first time. Eventually, after more misadventures with the establishment, he is reunited with Cindy (the hippie who had given him his face), now a prostitute, and is destroyed in his original form while saving her life; however, he survives by possessing one of her dolls.

In Grant Morrison's Animal Man, Brother Power is mentioned as having escaped Limbo. He also appeared briefly in Tom Peyer's Totems as a guest at John Constantine's 1999 New Year's Eve party.

Brother Power made a return appearance in The Brave and the Bold vol. 3 #29 (January 2010). This issue presents Cindy as having been a doctor at a free clinic, but after some tragedy, having opened a toy store that was burned down before the story begins. The story also casts doubt over Brother Power's true origin, as conflicting urban legends are mentioned, some stating that Brother Power is a reanimated dummy and others saying he is an elemental.

In addition, it is also established, retroactively, that the original series took place in Gotham City, although they had previously been explicitly set in San Francisco, with "the governor" clearly drawn as Reagan.

After awakening in 2009, Brother Power wanders throughout Gotham, confronted by a dark and hostile world where the hippie ideals of peace and love have been long forgotten, until he stumbles upon a burning building where an innocent homeless family have been left tied up and gagged inside. Though he and Batman rescue the young couple and their baby, when Batman tries to convince Brother Power to abandon the building he refuses, remarking that he does not belong in the modern world.

The issue ends with the dazed and fire-damaged Brother Power staggering through the sewers, where he collapses. In the closing narration, Batman finds comfort in the idea that Brother Power will eventually reawaken in a time when values have prevailed that are closer to his own.

The character played a role in the limited series Inferior Five as a guidance voice in Peacemaker's helmet, trying to draw him to a small, isolated town secretly controlled by aliens in order to rescue him and save the teenage children of the original team (it was also a way for him to get more notoriety by having a team-up with a better known character...).

This plan failed as the 12 issue series ended after only 6 issues which caused him to mope about how his plan could have worked, but then his old enthusiasm returned and he headed to the employment office to try and find a new comic book gig.

== Other versions ==
- Brother Power the Geek appears in the Elseworlds mini-series Conjurors.
- Brother Power the Geek appears in the Tangent Comics title The Joker.
- Brother Power the Geek appears in Kingdom Come.
- Brother Power the Geek appears in Planetary #7.
- Brother Power the Geek appears in Scooby-Doo Team-Up #34.

== In other media ==
=== Television ===
- A Brother Power the Geek comic appears in the Batman: The Brave and the Bold episode "Time Out For Vengeance!".
- A Brother Power the Geek comic appears in the Young Justice episode "Away Mission".

=== Video games ===
Brother Power the Geek appears as a character summon in Scribblenauts Unmasked: A DC Comics Adventure.

=== Miscellaneous ===
Brother Power the Geek appears in Batman: The Brave and the Bold #15.
