= Peter Brandvold =

American western fiction author

- Born: North Dakota, U.S.
- Education: University of North Dakota (BA)
- Occupation: Author
- Writing career
- Pen name: Frank Leslie
- Genre: Western fiction
- Website: peterbrandvold.com

Peter Brandvold is an American western fiction author.

== Life ==
Born in North Dakota, bestselling western novelist Peter Brandvold has penned over seventy fast-action westerns under his own name and his pen name, Frank Leslie. He is the author of the .45-Caliber books featuring Cuno Massey as well as the Lou Prophet and Yakima Henry novels. Recently, with his first young-adult western, LONNIE GENTRY and its successor, The Curse of Skull Canyon, he began publishing with Five Star. He is the head of "Mean Pete Publishing", the publisher of lightning-fast western ebooks.

Brandvold also penned 29 entries in the long-running Longarm series published by Berkley Books, as well as four books in the Trailsman series published by Signet. He also wrote two "Ralph Compton" novels—Navarro and Bullet Creek. He has several film scripts in development in Hollywood.

== Background ==
Brandvold was born and raised in North Dakota. He went to school at the University of North Dakota in Grand Forks and graduated there with a B.A. in English. He wrote for a number of magazines including the Country Journal and True West Magazine until 1995 when he started writing adventure stories. He lives in western Minnesota with his dog.

== Bibliography ==
- Once a Marshal (1998)
- Blood Mountain (1999)
- Dakota Kill (2000)
- Once More with a .44 (2000)
- Once a Lawman (2000)
- Once Hell Freezes Over (2001)
- The Romantics (2001)
- The Devil and Lou Prophet (2002)
- Once a Renegade (2002)
- Dealt the Devil's Hand (2002)
- Once Upon a Dead Man (2003)
- Riding with the Devil's Mistress (2003)
- Once Late with a .38 (2003)
- "Love and Bullets" (2004) (short story for The Funeral of Tanner Moody anthology)
- The Devil Gets His Due (2004)
- .45-Caliber Revenge (2004)
- Staring Down the Devil (2004)
- "Ghost Colts" (2005) (short story for Lone Star Law anthology)
- Navarro (2005) (writing for Ralph Compton)
- .45-Caliber Fury (2005)
- The Devil's Lair (2005)
- Rogue Lawman (2005)
- Bullet Creek (2005) (writing for Ralph Compton)
- .45-Caliber Manhunt (2006)
- Deadly Prey (2006)
- Hell on Wheels (2006)
- Cold Corpse, Hot Trail (2007)
- .45 Caliber Death Trap (2007)
- The Lonely Breed (2007) (writing as Frank Leslie)
- The Thunder Riders (2007) (writing as Frank Leslie)
- Guns N' Roses (2007) ("Bat Lash" comic book series)
- The Wild Breed (2008) (writing as Frank Leslie)
- Bullets Over Bedlam (2008)
- Dust of the Damned (2012)
- Ambush at Apache Pass: An Apache Wars Novel (2014)
