= Mordru the Merciless =

1968 DC Comics story arc

- Publisher: DC Comics
- Publication date: June – July 1968
- Genre: Science fiction, superhero
- Title(s): Adventure Comics #369-370
- Main character(s): Legion of Super-Heroes; Mordru; Insect Queen (Lana Lang); Pete Ross

Creative team
- Writer: Jim Shooter
- Penciller: Curt Swan
- Inker: Jack Abel
- Editor: Mort Weisinger

"Mordru the Merciless" is a story arc that was published by DC Comics, and was presented in Adventure Comics #369-370 (June–July 1968). It was written by Jim Shooter, pencilled by Curt Swan and inked by Jack Abel. The story arc features the first appearance of Mordru, arguably the most powerful enemy of the Legion of Super-Heroes.

== Plot ==
At the Legion of Super-Heroes' headquarters in the 30th century, Superboy, Duo Damsel, Mon-El and Shadow Lass race toward the Time Chamber, in an effort to escape the sorcerer Mordru, the Dark Lord. A being of near-limitless mystical power, Mordru conquered much of the galaxy until he was imprisoned in an airless steel block by Superboy and Mon-El. He remained locked away at Legion HQ until he was accidentally freed by Shadow Lass, a relatively new member of the team. (Note: Shadow Lass was inducted into the Legion in Adventure Comics #366 (March 1968), while the Fatal Five was briefly in control of her homeworld, Talok VIII.) With his mastery of magic (the one weakness shared by both Superboy and Mon-El) and with all the other Legionnaires seemingly destroyed, the team is forced to retreat. They travel to the 20th century and seek refuge in Superboy's hometown, Smallville.

Duo Damsel and Shadow Lass adopt secret identities which allow them to hide at the homes of Police Chief Douglas Parker and Lana Lang, while Mon-El stays with Jonathan and Martha Kent in his old guise as Clark's cousin Bob Cobb. (Note: Mon-El first used the Bob Cobb alias in Superboy #89 (June 1961).) Soon thereafter, Mordru blankets Smallville in a mystical shadow in an effort to locate the Legionnaires. When the shadow touches the town's residents, their minds are possessed by Mordru, although Shadow Lass' powers protects the Legionnaires from being detected. Meanwhile, Duo Damsel cries herself to sleep when Superboy fails to notice her romantic feelings for him.

Mordru attempts to flush the Legionnaires out of hiding by creating a myriad of disasters throughout the town, but the teens recognize that the calamities are illusions and ignore them. After a week passes without Superboy being seen, a group of gangsters tries to seize control of Smallville — but the Legionnaires defeat them in their civilian identities. Later, Lana spies the Legionnaires in costume, which allows Mordru to find them. The teens barely manage to escape a second time. Since the wizard is capable of probing their minds, the Legionnaires resume their civilian guises and use a hypnotic device to erase their own memories of their true identities.

After several weeks have passed, Mordru encases Smallville in an impenetrable shield and lifts the town into orbit above Earth. He then unleashes his 30th century soldiers upon the people of Smallville. The Legionnaires, robbed of their memories, provide no protection. Clark Kent's best friend Pete Ross, who is fully aware that Clark is Superboy, (Note: Pete Ross accidentally discovered Superboy's true identity in Superboy #90 (July 1961). He chose to keep that knowledge to himself, with even Superboy remaining unaware that Pete shares his secret.) realizes that Superboy has forgotten his super-identity. Since both Pete and Lana have auxiliary Legionnaire status, (Note: Pete Ross became an honorary Legionnaire in Superboy #98 (July 1962). Lana Lang, in her guise as Insect Queen, became a Legion reservist in Adventure Comics #355 (April 1967).) he enlists her aid, but is forced to reveal that Clark is Superboy. The two manage to jog Clark's memory by showing him that, like Superboy, his hair is unbreakable. He then retrieves the hypnotic device and restores the memories of his teammates.

The Legionnaires — including Pete and Lana (in her guise as Insect Queen) — launch an attack on Mordru, but are captured. Mordru conjures several of the 30th century's most notorious criminals and places the Legionnaires on trial in a mock courtroom. Acting as defense attorney, Pete tries to convince the jurors that Mordru will be a threat to them if he is not stopped. Later, one of the jurors — the sorcerer Wraithor — tries to help the Legionnaires escape through a cavern, but is discovered by Mordru and killed. Mordru summons a massive fireball of force in an effort to destroy the Legionnaires once and for all, but the energies cause the cavern to collapse. Mordru is entombed, unable to free himself.

With all of the Legionnaires having survived, Superboy uses the hypnosis ray to erase Lana's knowledge of his secret identity. Before he can do the same to Pete, Mon-El turns the ray on Superboy, causing Superboy to forget that Pete knows his secret identity. Mon-El notes to himself that Pete must maintain his knowledge of Superboy's identity, as he is destined to save the hero's life years in the future precisely because of that knowledge. Upon returning to the 30th century, the Legionnaires discover that their teammates were not killed by Mordru after all. Dream Girl had been forewarned of Mordru's attack through one of her precognitive visions. She contacted her sister, the White Witch, (Note: At this point, the White Witch was not a member of the Legion. She joined years later in Legion of Super-Heroes vol. 2, #294 (December 1982), following Darkseid's failed attempt to conquer the universe.) who cast a counter-spell which deflected Mordru's attack upon the Legion and their headquarters. Finally, Princess Projectra created an illusion which fooled the sorcerer into believing that he had succeeded.

== Collected editions ==
"Mordru the Merciless" is reprinted in the oversized publication Limited Collectors' Edition #C-49 (October/November 1976). The tale is also reprinted in Legion of Super-Heroes Archives, Volume 8 (ISBN 1-56389-430-0), which was published in 1999 as part of the DC Archive Editions collection.
