= Gus Bofa =

French illustrator (1883–1968)

Gus Bofa (born Charles Blanchot) (23 May 1883 in Brive-la-Gaillarde – 1 September 1968) was a French illustrator, known for his work on satirical newspapers and erotic novels.

== Early life and education ==
Son of Colonel Charles Blanchot (1834-1918), of whom he was the 11th and penultimate child, he spent his childhood in Bordeaux then moved to Paris (his father was appointed military commander of the Senate) where he enrolled at the Lycée Henri-IV, establishment where he met André Dunoyer de Segonzac and Maurice Constantin-Weyer who would remain his closest friends. It was at the early age of five that he invented his artist name, Gus Bofa.

== Career ==
=== Military service and career beginnings ===
After a few years as an engineer, he launched into posters and took part in Le Rire, then Le Sourire, and La Petite Sirène. He also designed costumes and sets for the theatre. During the First World War he composed the covers of the magazine La Baïonnette. Between the wars, he collaborated with the monthly Le Crapouillot.

His friend Pierre Mac Orlan said of him: “Gus Bofa is above all a writer who chose drawing to achieve his goals. A text by Bofa, a drawing by Bofa are constructed from the same material and both are animated by the same ray of humorous poetry that includes everything that holds a place between life and death. »

He was destined for a military career but gave it up when he entered the Saint-Cyr competition. To earn a little money, he began, in 1900, to sell drawings to illustrated newspapers such as Le Sourire, Le Rire, or La Risette.

After his military service, and a few office jobs without interest, he created, around 1906, the Gus-Bofa Posters. On the strength of his success as a poster designer, he wrote stories for the press, reviews for the music hall and wrote the theatrical column for Le Rire then Le Sourire, newspapers which he briefly edited and where he had Pierre Mac Orlan debut.

On 7 December 1914, Bofa was wounded by German machine gun fire. At a military hospital, he refused to allow surgeons to amputate his leg. It eventually healed well enough that he was able to walk without crutches.

=== Inter-war period ===
In the aftermath of this war, which left him crippled, he began, pushed by Mac Orlan, a career as an illustrator of luxury books. He thus portrayed Mac Orlan, Courteline, Swift, Voltaire, De Quincey, Cervantès, or Octave Mirbeau. At the same time, he published personal albums such as The Book of the Hundred Years War or Chez les toubibs.

Founder and director of the Salon de l'A raignée, which wants to give freedom to designers and push them to a more personal art, Bofa also wrote the literary column of Crapouillot, a literary and artistic magazine, which he will hold until 1939.

With the 1930s, his work took on an increasingly personal and haunted turn. Malaises describes existential angst and The Symphony of Fear proposes fear as the motor of human history. Zoo presents man as a denatured animal.

=== Second World War ===
In 1940, with the entry of the German army into Paris, Bofa had to withdraw. Bofa, who was staying in Cormeilles-en-Vexin, had no choice but to withdraw to Mauperthuis, "sheltered from the radios, the newspapers, the unbearable discussions between the deaf and the blind, on the unknowable war".

=== Late career and death ===
The 1950s marked the end of luxury publishing and, for Bofa, the beginning of oblivion. Indifferent to glory, he deepens, through autobiographical books, of which he signs texts and images, such as La Voie libre, Déblais or La Croisière incertaine, a disillusioned and pessimistic reflection on the human condition.

He died in 1968 at the age of eighty-five.
