= Joe Orlando =

Italian-American illustrator, writer, editor and cartoonist (1927–1998)

- Joe Orlando in the early 1950s
- Born: April 4, 1927 Bari, Italy
- Died: December 23, 1998 (aged 71) Manhattan, New York, U.S.
- Areas: Cartoonist, Penciller, Inker, Editor, Colourist
- Notable works: Creepy, Mad, vice president of DC Comics
- Awards: Inkpot Award (1980); Will Eisner Award Hall of Fame (2007)

Joseph Orlando (April 4, 1927 – December 23, 1998) was an Italian-American illustrator, writer, editor and cartoonist during a lengthy career spanning six decades. He was the associate publisher of Mad and the vice president of DC Comics, where he edited numerous titles and ran DC's Special Projects department.

== Early life ==
Orlando was born in Bari, Italy, immigrating to the United States in 1929. He began drawing at an early age, going to art classes at a neighborhood boys' club when he was seven years old. He continued there until he was 14, winning prizes annually in their competitions, including a John Wanamaker bronze medal. In 1941, he began attending the School of Industrial Art (later the High School of Art and Design), where he studied illustration. This school was a breeding ground for a number of comics artists, including Richard Bassford, Sy Barry, Frank Giacoia, Carmine Infantino, Rocke Mastroserio, Alex Toth and future comics letterer Gaspar Saladino. Infantino and Orlando remained close friends for decades. While Orlando was still a student, he drew his first published illustrations, scenes of Mark Twain's The Prince and the Pauper for a high-school textbook.

After his high school graduation, Orlando entered the U.S. Army and was assigned to the military police, doing stockade guard duty, followed by 18 months in Europe. From Le Havre, France, he was sent to Antwerp, Belgium and then to Germany, where he stenciled boxcars and guarded strategic supplies for the occupation forces.

After his 1947 discharge, he returned to New York and began study at the Art Students League on the GI Bill. He entered the comic book field in 1949 when the packager Lloyd Jacquet assigned him to draw for the Catholic-oriented Treasure Chest. This was a "Chuck White" story that paid nine dollars a page. At the Jacquet Studio he met fellow artist Tex Blaisdell, and the two teamed later on many projects.

== Professional career ==
=== EC and Mad ===
In the early 1950s, he was an assistant to Wally Wood on stories for several publishers, including Fox, Youthful, Avon and EC Comics, before becoming a regular staff artist with EC in mid-1951. He was earning $25 a page at EC, and by mid-1951 saw his first EC stories published under his own name.

After EC, from 1956 to 1959, he drew Classics Illustrated adaptations, including Ben-Hur, A Tale of Two Cities and Rudyard Kipling's Kim. In addition to many contributions to EC's Mad (1957–1969), Orlando also scripted the Little Orphan Annie comic strip beginning in 1964. He did covers for Newsweek and New Times, and his work as an illustrator appeared in National Lampoon, children's books and numerous comic books.

=== Creepy editor ===
For Warren Publishing's black-and-white horror comics magazine Creepy, debuting in 1964, Orlando was not only an illustrator but also a story editor on early issues. His credit on the first issue masthead read: "Story Ideas: Joe Orlando."

He also worked in toy design, packaging and advertising; sales of Harold von Braunhut's Sea-Monkeys escalated considerably after Orlando drew a series of unusual advertisements visualizing the creatures' enchanted and peaceful undersea kingdom. In 1992, the short-lived live-action television show The Amazing Live Sea Monkeys with Howie Mandel used special effects make-up designs based on the character concepts created by Orlando for his Sea Monkeys illustrations.

=== DC Comics ===
This Joe Orlando page with lettering by Todd Klein was created for Alan Moore and Dave Gibbons's Watchmen (1987)

In 1966, Orlando and writer E. Nelson Bridwell created the parody superhero team The Inferior Five in Showcase #62 (June 1966). This lighthearted feature would soon receive its own ongoing series. Orlando launched the Swing with Scooter series with writers Barbara Friedlander and Jack Miller in July 1966. After 16 years of freelancing, Orlando was hired in 1968 by DC Comics, where he was the editor of a full line of comic books, including Adventure Comics, All-Star Western, Anthro, Bat Lash, House of Mystery, Plop!, Swamp Thing, and The Witching Hour, also scripting for several of these titles. He was one of the first artists to become an editor at DC. Orlando coined the names of the Weird War Tales and Weird Western Tales titles.

While serving as DC's vice president, he guided the company's Special Projects department. This included the creation of art for T-shirts and other licensed products, negotiating with such companies as American Greetings and Topps, working with editor Joey Cavalieri on Looney Tunes Magazine and supervising production of trading cards, Six Flags logos, DC character style guides and other items.

In the late 1960s, Orlando hired Filipino artist Tony DeZuniga for work on some of DC's horror titles. In 1971, Orlando and DC publisher Carmine Infantino traveled to the Philippines on a recruiting trip for more artists. Alfredo Alcala, Mar Amongo, Steve Gan, Ernie Chan, Alex Niño, Nestor Redondo, and Gerry Talaoc were some of the Filipino komik artists who would work for DC, particularly in the 1970s and 1980s. For his long association with DC's horror titles, Vertigo Comics editor Karen Berger credited Orlando for sowing the "seeds that grew into Vertigo."

During the 1980s, Orlando began teaching at the School of Visual Arts, continuing as an art instructor there for many years.

In 1987, he created an illustration for the supplemental text piece from Watchmen #5 (January 1987), a page from the comic-within-the-comic, Tales of the Black Freighter. Orlando's contribution was designed as if it were a page from the fake title; the conceit being that Orlando had been the artist for a run of stories from the fictional Tales of the Black Freighter comic. Watchmen writer Alan Moore chose Orlando because he felt that if pirate stories were popular in the Watchmen universe, DC editor Julius Schwartz would have lured Orlando into drawing a pirate comic book. The comic-within-a-comic pages were credited to the fictitious artist "Walt Feinberg", and all art attributed to Feinberg was actually drawn by series-artist Dave Gibbons. The Orlando page was the only artwork for the series not by Gibbons.

A limited series featuring The Phantom published by DC in 1988 was written by Peter David and drawn by Orlando and Dennis Janke.

Orlando had a long working association with the prolific letterer Ben Oda, roughing out display lettering effects which Oda would finish. During the 1990s (after Oda had died), Orlando was pleased to discover that designer-typographer Rick Spanier, working on a Macintosh computer, could create polished Oda-like finishes of Orlando's roughs. These Orlando-Spanier collaborations were printed in DC's Superman Style Guide and other DC style guides.

=== Associate publisher of Mad ===
Wally Wood's drawing of Joe Orlando (left) and Wood collaborating on a comics page in the early 1950s

After the death of Mad founder-publisher William Gaines in 1992, publishing company/owner Time Warner positioned Mad under the purview of fellow publishing subsidiary DC Comics. After this shift, Orlando became the magazine's Associate Publisher. Concurrently, he was involved in creating exclusive Mad products for the then-new Warner Brothers Studio Store on Fifth Avenue.

Although he retired from DC in 1996, he nevertheless maintained an office at Mad where he worked on Mad cover concepts and other projects for the next two years. He illustrated four additional articles for publication in Mad with the last appearing in the July 1997 issue.

== Personal life and death ==
Orlando married his first wife, Gloria, in September 1951.

He died in Grand Central Terminal on December 23, 1998, survived by his second wife, Karin, and four children.

== Reprints ==
Orlando's artwork for EC Comics has been reprinted extensively by publisher Russ Cochran. Following the 2006 culmination of Cochran's Complete EC Library reprint series with the EC Picto-Fiction volumes, other EC reprint volumes featuring Orlando illustrations have been published by Steve Geppi's Gemstone Publishing in their EC Archives series.

== Awards ==
He received the Inkpot Award in 1980 and was chosen for the Will Eisner Award Hall of Fame in 2007. His contributions to EC's Weird Science earned him a ranking in Entertainment Weekly's "Sci-Fi Top 100". He appeared in a taped segment on Horror Hall of Fame II, telecast October 17, 1991.

== Bibliography ==
=== DC Comics ===
- Action Comics Weekly #617 (Phantom Stranger) (1988)
- Adventure Comics #457–458 (Eclipso) (1978)
- Falling in Love #97 (1968)
- Forbidden Tales of Dark Mansion #7 (1972)
- Ghosts #74 (1979)
- House of Mystery #179, 201 (1969–1972)
- House of Secrets #92, 128 (1971–1975)
- Legion of Super-Heroes vol. 3 #6 (1985)
- Looney Tunes Magazine #1 (writer) (1990)
- 'Mazing Man #5 (1986)
- Metamorpho #5–6 (1966)
- The Phantom #1–4 (1988)
- Phantom Stranger vol. 2 #15 (plotter) (1971)
- Plop! #10 (writer) (1975)
- Secret Origins vol. 2 #10 (Phantom Stranger) (1987)
- Secret Society of Super Villains #11 (1977)
- The Shadow Annual #1 (1987)
- Showcase #62–63, 65 (Inferior Five); #97 (Power Girl) (inker) (1966–1978)
- Sinister House of Secret Love #2 (plotter) (1971)
- Strange Adventures #202 (1967)
- Super Friends #1 (1976)
- Supergirl promotional comic book #1 (plotter); #2 (plotter/penciller) (1984–1986)
- Superman #400 (1984)
- The Superman Family #186–187 (Jimmy Olsen) (1977–1978)
- Swing with Scooter #1–6, 11–12, 15 (1966–1968)
- Teen Titans Spotlight #11 (Brotherhood of Evil) (1987)
- Time Warp #2 (1979)
- Tomahawk #118 (1968)
- The Unexpected #202 (1980)
- Wasteland #12–13, 15 (1988)
- Weird Worlds #4 (1973)
- Young Romance #154–156 (1968)

=== EC Comics ===
- Confessions Illustrated #1–2 (1956)
- Crime Illustrated #1 (1955)
- Crime SuspenStories #16, 22, 24, 26 (1953–1955)
- The Haunt of Fear #9, 12 (1951–1952)
- Impact #2, 5 (1955)
- Incredible Science Fiction #30, 32–33 (1955–1956)
- Mad #8, 32–41, 43–94, 96–97, 99–100, 353, 356, 358–359 (1954–1997)
- M.D. #1–5 (1955–1956)
- Panic #1–9 (1954–1955)
- Shock SuspenStories #1, 3–7, 9–10, 12, 16–17 (1952–1954)
- Tales from the Crypt #27–30, 35, 37, 39, 46 (1951–1955)
- Terror Illustrated #1 (1955)
- Valor #3–4 (1955)
- Vault of Horror #24, 31, 40 (1952–1955)
- Weird Fantasy #9–22 (1951–1953)
- Weird Science #10–22 (1951–1953)
- Weird Science-Fantasy #23–29 (1954–1955)

=== Marvel Comics ===
- Adventure into Mystery #5 (1957)
- Astonishing #47, 58, 61 (1956–1957)
- Battle #47 (1956)
- Battle Action #22 (1956)
- Battle Ground #15, 17 (1957)
- Battlefront #47 (1957)
- Daredevil #2–4 (1964)
- G.I. Tales #6 (1957)
- Journey into Mystery #30, 32, 45 (1956–1957)
- Journey into Unknown Worlds #44, 57 (1956–1957)
- Marines at War #6–7 (1957)
- Marines in Battle #14 (1956)
- Marvel Tales #149, 151, 157 (1956–1957)
- My Own Romance #61 (1958)
- Mystery Tales #51 (1957)
- Mystic #57, 61 (1957)
- Mystical Tales #1–2, 7 (1956–1957)
- Quick-Trigger Western #16 (1957)
- Ringo Kid #12 (1956)
- Six-Gun Western #2 (1957)
- Spellbound #25, 28 (1955–1956)
- Strange Tales #41, 44, 46, 49, 52 (1955–1956)
- Strange Tales of the Unusual #2, 7 (1956)
- Tales of Justice #65–66 (1957)
- Uncanny Tales #49–50, 53 (1956–1957)
- War Comics #42 (1956)
- World of Fantasy #8, 13–14 (1957–1958)
- World of Mystery #5 (1957)

Preceded by George Kashdan	House of Mystery editor 1968–1977	Succeeded by Paul Levitz
Preceded by Jack Schiff	House of Secrets editor 1969–1977	Succeeded by Paul Levitz
Preceded by Mike Sekowsky	Adventure Comics editor 1971–1976	Succeeded by Paul Levitz
Preceded by Archie Goodwin	Star Spangled War Stories editor 1974–1977	Succeeded by Paul Levitz
Preceded by n/a	DC Universe Executive Editor; 1976–1983	Succeeded by Dick Giordano
