= E. Nelson Bridwell =

American comic book artist (1931–1987)

- Bridwell in 1974
- Born: Edward Nelson Bridwell; September 22, 1931 Sapulpa, Oklahoma, U.S.
- Died: January 23, 1987 (aged 55) Kings County, New York, U.S.
- Areas: Writer, editor
- Notable works: The Inferior Five
- Awards: Bill Finger Award (2019)

Edward Nelson Bridwell (September 22, 1931 – January 23, 1987) was an American writer for Mad magazine (writing the now-famous catchphrase "What you mean...we?" in a 1958 parody of The Lone Ranger) and various comic books published by DC Comics. One of the writers for the Batman comic strip and Super Friends, he also wrote The Inferior Five, among other comics. He has been called "DC's self-appointed continuity cop."

== Career ==
Bridwell was born on his grand-parents' farm, Oak Hill Dairy, near Sapulpa, Oklahoma, a small city with at the time a population of a little over 10,000 people, and grew up in Oklahoma City.

Bridwell's early childhood interest in mythology and folklore stayed with him throughout his professional life and permeated much of his work. He credited his fame to his third grade teacher, Ryan Samuel, for interesting him in comics. Bridwell "was one of the first 'comics fans' hired in the industry after the long, bleak 1950s". Although his first published work consisted of a text page in Adventures into the Unknown #9 (Feb–March 1950) published by the American Comics Group, he had since he "was still a kid" created various characters who would later evolve into those used in comics such as The Inferior Five.

In 1962, while still residing in Oklahoma City, Bridwell submitted to the Magazine of Fantasy & Science Fiction his first idea for a Feghoot adventure, a specific type of shaggy dog story that ends in a humorous and unexpected play on words. His story was promptly accepted by the feature's pseudonymous author, Grendel Briarton (Reginald Bretnor), and shortly followed by yet another submission from Bridwell which was also accepted ("Dr. Jacqueline Missed Her Hide" and "Nude Rally Tea Pact", respectively.) Besides F&SF, both stories would appear in the various Feghoot anthologies to follow.

Caricature of E. Nelson Bridwell by Dave Manak (c. 1976).

After writing a few stories for Mad and for Katy Keene, Bridwell began working for DC Comics in 1965 as an assistant to editor Mort Weisinger, "on the Superman titles, eventually becoming an editor himself (Lois Lane, and later The Superman Family)." He wrote scripts for various Weisinger-edited series, such as Superboy and The Legion of Super-Heroes, as well as writing for DC anthology titles such as Unexpected, Mystery in Space and Strange Adventures. Jim Shooter (who also worked with Weisinger) recalls that Weisinger did not always treat his assistant well, saying that his "assistant was Nelson Bridwell and boy, he tortured Nelson. He just was awful to Nelson." Bridwell, however, recalled in 1980 an important lesson learned from Weisinger, that:

"You've got to keep in mind that while there are a lot of people who've read about the characters before, there are always new people coming along, and you've got to realize that you can't count on them to know the whole legend of the character."

This lesson set him in good stead both when he helped DC produce three 1970s anthologies — Superman from the Thirties to the Seventies (1971), Batman from the Thirties to the Seventies (1971), and Shazam from the Forties to the Seventies (1977) — and when he wrote for the comic book series based on "one of the best rated TV shows on Saturday morning", Super Friends.

Concurrent with his duties for DC, Bridwell "was submitting material as a freelancer to Mad", some of which was illustrated by Joe Orlando, who Bridwell in 1965 first suggested as artist for The Inferior Five.

=== Continuity ===
Recalling an early interest in comic book continuity, Bridwell "remembered getting a bit perturbed at times when I was a kid by having things that didn't fit", particularly over the wide range of Martian races in evidence in the adventures of DC's Atom, Wonder Woman, and Superman characters. Bridwell was also an early advocate of the theory that the Marvel and DC characters "exist in the same universe", citing early inter-company crossovers such as Superman vs. The Amazing Spider-Man and a cross-company interlocking storyline, with real-world crossover characters, between Justice League of America #103, Thor #207 and Amazing Adventures #16.

Bridwell's love and knowledge of old comics led to his becoming editor on numerous reprint books, including digests, giant-size comics, and hardcover anthologies. He also worked as assistant editor to Julius Schwartz, keeping track of continuity between the numerous Superman titles published. Part of his job was to manage the letter columns for all the Superman titles, and in response to constant reader questions, Bridwell standardized the Kryptonian language and alphabet. Dubbed "Kryptonese", Bridwell established the 118-character alphabet, which was used by DC until John Byrne's 1986 "reboot" of the Superman universe.

=== The Inferior Five ===
Bridwell and Joe Orlando created the Inferior Five in Showcase #62 (May–June 1966). Talking about the humorous super-hero series, Bridwell recalls that:

"Jack Miller came up with the idea of a group of incompetent heroes, and at first he came up with the title The Inferior Four. When I created five heroes, he changed it to The Inferior Five. I completely created the heroes as a clown set, and Joe Orlando created the costumes."

=== Other comics ===
Bridwell wrote for several other DC titles, including Action Comics, Adventure Comics, Shazam!, Superman, The Superman Family, World's Finest Comics, and The Legion of Super-Heroes. In collaboration with artist Bob Oksner, he created the humorous detective comic Angel and the Ape.

Bridwell and artist Frank Springer co-created the Secret Six in the first issue of the team's eponymous series in May 1968. The first use of the Super Friends name on a DC Comics publication was in Limited Collectors' Edition #C–41 (December 1975–January 1976) which reprinted stories from Justice League of America within a new framing sequence by Bridwell and artist Alex Toth. In 1976, Bridwell and Ric Estrada launched an ongoing Super Friends comic book series.

Bridwell edited DC Comics' first comic book limited series, The World of Krypton (July–September 1979). He co-wrote Secrets of the Legion of Super-Heroes with Paul Kupperberg and followed it with The Krypton Chronicles.

He co-created the Justice League members Fire and Ice in the Super Friends series and introduced the Global Guardians in DC Comics Presents #46 (June 1982).

He wrote Captain Carrot and His Amazing Zoo Crew!, The Oz/Wonderland War trilogy, as well as occasional stories for the black-and-white horror comics Creepy and Eerie, published by Warren Publishing. His last freelance writing work was for Cracked magazine.

As an editor, Bridwell compiled a number of issues of DC 100 Page Super Spectacular, collecting out-of-print stories from the DC archive, often under new covers featuring a Bridwell-created character key.

=== Papers ===
Following his death from lung cancer on January 23, 1987, his papers were acquired by the McFarlin Library at the University of Tulsa in 1989.

== Homages ==
- In Watchmen, Captain Metropolis was named "Nelson Gardner" as a tribute to Bridwell and to Gardner Fox.
- Astro City #5 introduced "Mr. Bridwell" (alias), a shape-shifting extraterrestrial and undercover advance scout for the invading "Enelsians", compiling, much like his (and their) namesake, an encyclopedic database of Earth's superheroes.

== Awards and honors ==
In 2005, Bridwell was posthumously inducted into the Oklahoma Cartoonists Hall of Fame in Pauls Valley, Oklahoma, located in the Toy and Action Figure Museum. In 2019, he was recognized with the Bill Finger Award.

== Bibliography ==
=== DC Comics ===
- Action Comics (Legion of Super-Heroes): #379, 383, 385–387, 390–391 (1969–1970); (Private Life of Clark Kent): #459, 464; (Krypto): #462; (Superman): #561, 563, 576, 580 (1976–1984)
- Adventure Comics (Legion of Super-Heroes): #350, 351, 356, 403; (Supergirl): #383, 387, 393–394, 409 (1966–1971); (Dial H for Hero): #489–490; (Shazam!): #491–492, 498 (1982–1983)
- Amazing World of Superman Metropolis Edition (1973)
- Batman #208, 213 (1969)
- Captain Carrot and His Amazing Zoo Crew! #10–11 (1982–1983)
- DC Comics Presents #44, 46, 71, Annual #1 (1982–1984)
- Detective Comics (Hawkman): #428, 434, 446, 452, 454–455; (Elongated Man): #430 (1972–1976)
- The Flash #175 (1967)
- House of Mystery #178–179, 184, 205, 209, 217, 229, 253, 257 (1969–1978)
- Inferior Five #1–7 (1967–1968)
- Krypton Chronicles miniseries #1–3 (1981)
- The New Adventures of Superboy #9, 12, 23–24; (Dial H for Hero): #28–49 (1980–1984)
- Secrets of Haunted House #8 (1977)
- Secrets of Sinister House #8, 12, 14 (1972–1973)
- Shazam! #10–12, 16, 18, 25, 27–28, 30–35 (1974–1978)
- Showcase (Inferior Five): #62–63, 65; (Maniaks): #68–69, 71 (1966–1967)
- Strange Adventures #186 (1966)
- Superboy #131, 137, 142–143, 146–147; (Legion of Super-Heroes): #172, 176, (1965–1971)
- Super Friends #1–19, 21, 23, 25–40, 42–47, Special #1 (1976–1981)
- Superman #170, 187, 203, 233–234, 287, 289 (1964–1975); 408, Special #3 (1985)
- Superman Family #182, 199, 201-222 (1977-1982)
- Superman's Girl Friend, Lois Lane #66, 79 (1966–1967)
- Superman's Pal Jimmy Olsen #118, 120, 123–124, 128–129, 150, 152 (1969–1972)
- Weird War Tales #17 (1971-1983)
- World's Finest Comics (Shazam!) #253–270, 272–282 (1978–1982)

=== EC Comics ===
- Mad #27, 34, 38–40, 44, 53, 137, 158 (1956–1975)
- Mad Special #27, 30, 36 (1978–1981)
- More Trash From Mad #2 (1959)
- Worst From Mad #1 (1958)

=== Warren Publishing ===
- Creepy #142 (1982)
- Eerie #2, 16, 24 (1966–1969)
- Eerie Yearbook 1970 (1969)
