= Inferior Five =

DC Comics parody superhero team

- Showcase #62 featuring the Inferior Five.

Publication information
- Publisher: DC Comics
- First appearance: Showcase #62 (May–June 1966)
- Created by: E. Nelson Bridwell (writer); Joe Orlando (artist); Mike Esposito (inker)

In-story information
- Member(s): Merryman (high intellect, weakling's body); Awkwardman (flawless in water, clumsy on land); The Blimp (could fly only when propelled by a tail wind); White Feather (skilled archer, but scared of people looking at him); The Dumb Bunny (superstrength, terrible grades)

The Inferior Five (or I5) are a parody superhero team appearing in books by the American publisher DC Comics. Created by writer E. Nelson Bridwell and artist Joe Orlando, the team premiered in the DC Comics title Showcase #62 (May-June 1966).

The Five are the children of members of a superhero team called the Freedom Brigade, a parody of the Justice League of America. In early appearances, the team encountered spoofs of Marvel Comics heroes, including the Man-Mountain and the Egg's Men. When the team got their own series, early issues also mocked the Fantastic Four and Thor.

== Publication history ==
=== First series ===
After appearing in Showcase #62, 63, and 65 (1966), they got their own title which lasted 12 issues. The first 10 had new material and were published from 1967 to 1968.

Issues #11 and 12 were published in 1972, and titled Inferior 5 (using the number 5 rather than spelling out the word) and were all reprints, except for the covers. Nothing changed with the alteration of the title.

=== Pre-Crisis ===
The team has appeared only sporadically after their series was canceled, with Showcase #100 being their only new appearance during the Bronze Age of Comic Books. Other appearances include a cameo appearance in Crisis on Infinite Earths, Captain Carrot and His Amazing Zoo Crew! in The Oz–Wonderland War #3 (March 1986), and the Grant Morrison-written Animal Man series. They appear in one panel in JLA: Another Nail as Flash and the Atom take a trip through many dimensions.

Although the Inferior Five's original stories made frequent references to other prominent DC heroes, Captain Carrot and His Amazing Zoo Crew! in The Oz–Wonderland War #3 revealed their adventures to have occurred on "Earth-Twelve", which had its own doppelgangers of the JLA, the Teen Titans, etc., meaning that any such references were out of continuity in relation to the heroes of DC's primary Earth-One.

=== Post-Crisis ===
Following Crisis on Infinite Earths, where the Five were seen in background cameos such as Ambush Bug #3 where Merryman breaks the fourth wall and becomes an apologist for the team's existence (Ambush Bug plays loose with any sort of continuity but that's knowing he's in a comic book one of his superpowers and it occasionally affects those around him). In Ambush Bug Year None #3, Bug and Dumb Bunny get married during a blackout in Las Vegas which both immediately regret and Dumb Bunny ends up leaving him.

The team's sole continuity appearance as a team was in the 1991 Angel and the Ape miniseries, where it was revealed that Angel and Dumb Bunny are half-sisters. Members of the Justice League of America had cameos in the series, indicating that the Inferior Five now existed on the Post-Crisis Earth.

The Inferior Five appear in issue #17 of the Batman: The Brave and the Bold comics. The Inferior Five team up with the Legion of Substitute Heroes in The Brave and The Bold #35 and with Bat-Mite in Bat-Mite #5 (Dec. 2015).

Steve Gerber proposed a Vertigo version of the Inferior Five as a send-up of the "dark 'n' gritty" comics of the period, but this was rejected. Gerber later claimed that DC refused to publish anything with the title on the grounds that it would make them look "inferior" for publishing it.

=== 2019 mini-series ===
In September 2019, a 12-issue maxi-series by Keith Giffen was initiated. It was a reinvention of the team, as the protagonists are now children in the small town of Dangerfield, Arizona. It revolves around a mystery regarding their parents, and they are the only ones that notice something strange is going on. It takes place in 1988, where the invasion was successful on the town of Dangerfield. The aliens are in hiding, still experimenting with the metagene, and keeping a focus on the five kids. The book later reveals that the Invasion is metafictional. The series also contains a backup feature starring Peacemaker. The number of issues was soon reduced from 12 to 6. There was a fifteen-month publishing hiatus between issues #4 (December 2019) and #5 (March 2021), with the last two issues released digitally.

== Members ==
- Merryman (Myron Victor), is a comics artist, the son of the Patriot and Lady Liberty (parodying Uncle Sam and Miss America), and grandson of Yellowjacket and a descendant of the Crimson Chrysanthemum (parodies of the Green Hornet and the Scarlet Pimpernel). He is the team's leader and wears a jester outfit, having decided in the team's first appearance that if he was going to make a fool of himself, he might as well look the part. Merryman is a skilled martial artist, but is physically weak with little practical ability to use such skills. He returned in Final Crisis as coordinator of the residents of Limbo, leading them in assisting the Supermen of the multiverse to fend off an attack from Mandrakk the Dark Monitor, causing Superman to reflect that anyone could be a hero.
- Awkwardman (Leander Brent) is a beachcomber and the son of Mr. Might (parodying Superman) and the Mermaid (parodying Aquaman). He is super-strong and able to live underwater, having inherited powers from both parents, but is also very clumsy. Awkwardman requires periodic contact with water, which he primarily achieves by pouring it over himself with a watering can. His codename is a pun on Aquaman; his surname "Brent" rhymes with Superman's surname of "Kent".
- Blimp (Herman Cramer) is a diner owner and the obese son of Captain Swift (parodying the Flash). He can fly, but only at slow speeds.
- White Feather (William King) is a photographer and the son of the Bowman (parodying Green Arrow) and an unidentified woman. He was a superb archer, but has crippling anxiety. His surname King parallels Green Arrow's surname Queen, and his codename is a reference to a traditional symbol of cowardice.
- Dumb Bunny (Athena Tremor) is a model and the daughter of Princess Power (parodying Wonder Woman) and Steve Tremor (parodying Steve Trevor). In later continuity, her father is instead Professor Theo O'Day and she has a half-sister named Angel. As the Dumb Bunny, Athena is described as "strong as an ox and almost as intelligent". She is named after the Greek goddess of wisdom, Athena.

== Superior Five ==
The Superior Five, a villainous group based on the Inferior Five, appear in the miniseries Villains United. They consist of:

- Tremor (Awkwardman)
- Hindenburg (Blimp)
- Splitshot (White Feather)
- Lagomorph (Dumb Bunny)
- Jongleur (Merryman)

== In other media ==
The Inferior Five appear as character summons in Scribblenauts Unmasked: A DC Comics Adventure.

== Awards ==
The series and characters have been recognized in the field, being awarded a 1966 Alley Award for Best Humor Title: Costumed.
