= Anthro (comics) =

- Anthro on the cover of Showcase #74, art by Howard Post.

Publication information
- Publisher: DC Comics
- First appearance: Showcase #74 (March 1968)
- Created by: Howie Post (writer & artist)

In-story information
- Species: Evolved Cro-Magnon or Neanderthal
- Team affiliations: The Bear Tribe; Freedom Fighters; Team 13
- Abilities: Expertise in hunting and tracking

Anthro is a fictional superhero character published by DC Comics, presented as the "first boy", a caveman born to Neanderthal parents. Anthro was created by cartoonist Howard Post, under supervision of Joe Orlando. He first appeared in Showcase #74 (March 1968).

== Publication history ==
After a single Showcase appearance, Anthro received his own title, which lasted for 6 issues (1968–69). All six issues were written and drawn by Post, with Wallace Wood providing inking for the final issue.

Since the cancellation of his title, he has made minor appearances, most notably in Crisis on Infinite Earths #2. Subsequently, Anthro appeared in the 2006 revival of Tales of the Unexpected and the 2008 miniseries Final Crisis by Grant Morrison and J. G. Jones. Anthro also starred in the first story in DC Universe Holiday Special 2010.

== Fictional character biography ==
Anthro is the first caveboy born in the Stone Age. His father, Cro-Magnon (or Neanderthal) caveman Ne-Ahn, is the chief of his tribe; his mother, a captive member of another tribe. Winning two competing cavegirls as his wives, Cro-Magnon women Embra and Nima, Anthro begins the human race, as Embra lives to bear his first child.

Justice League Europe Annual #2 features a version of Anthro. In an alternate time-line, an older Silver Sorceress, lost in time, is rescued from a large creature by Anthro. He exhibits great eagerness, smashing the beast long after it is subdued. A bored cavegirl, either Embra or Nima, joins the Sorceress in watching Anthro's 'battle'.

Anthro is featured in the graphic novel Doctor Thirteen: Architecture & Mortality, where he is frozen in ice and resurrected in the modern day.

In Final Crisis, the New God Metron appears before Anthro and gives him the knowledge and skill to make fire. Anthro then fights off a group of savage raiders led by Vandal Savage using a burning stick. In the final issue of Final Crisis, Anthro appears as an old man, drawing the symbols he saw on Metron's body on a cave wall. As he finishes drawing, he dies peacefully, watched over by a time-displaced Bruce Wayne. The after-effects of Anthro's death on his friends and family is explored in the limited series Batman: The Return of Bruce Wayne.

In Dark Nights: Death Metal, Anthro is among the superheroes whom Batman resurrects using a Black Lantern ring.

== Other versions ==
- An alternate timeline variant of Anthro appears in the second volume of Booster Gold. This version is part of a resistance group against Maxwell Lord alongside Green Arrow, Hawkman, Wild Dog, and Pantha.
- An alternate universe variant of Anthro from Earth-20 appears in Final Crisis and The Multiversity. This version is a member of the Society of Super-Heroes, a group of pulp-style mystery men led by Doc Fate. Additionally, he is known as Immortal Man and gained immortality from the same meteorite that gave Vandal Savage his powers.

== In other media ==
- Anthro makes a non-speaking cameo appearance in the Batman: The Brave and the Bold episode "The Siege of Starro!".
- Anthro appears as a character summon in Scribblenauts Unmasked: A DC Comics Adventure.
