= Showcase (comics) =

Comic anthology series published by DC Comics

- Showcase #4, featuring the Silver Age Flash, art by Carmine Infantino.

Publication information
- Publisher: DC Comics
- Schedule: Bimonthly
- Format: Ongoing
- Publication date: March 1956 – September 1970; August 1977 – September 1978
- No. of issues: 104
- Main character(s): Challengers of the Unknown; Flash; Green Lantern; Lois Lane; Space Ranger; Adam Strange

Creative team
- Written by: Sergio Aragonés, Otto Binder, E. Nelson Bridwell, John Broome, Arnold Drake, Gardner Fox, Edmond Hamilton, Bob Haney, Robert Kanigher, Jack Kirby, Jack Miller, Don Segall, Steve Skeates
- Artist(s): Murphy Anderson, Ross Andru, Bob Brown, Nick Cardy, Steve Ditko, Russ Heath, Carmine Infantino, Gil Kane, Jack Kirby, Joe Kubert, Ruben Moreira, Win Mortimer, Bob Oksner, Joe Orlando, John Prentice, Mike Sekowsky

Showcase is a comic anthology series published by DC Comics. The general theme of the series was to feature new and minor characters as a way to gauge reader interest in them, without the difficulty and risk of featuring untested characters in their own ongoing titles. Showcase is regarded as the most successful of such tryout series, having been published continuously for more than 14 years, launching numerous popular titles, and maintaining a considerable readership of its own. The series ran from March–April 1956 to September 1970, suspending publication with issue #93, and then was revived for eleven issues from August 1977 to September 1978.

== Original series ==
Showcase featured characters in either one-shot appearances or brief two- or three-issue runs as a way to determine reader interest, without the financial risk of featuring "untested" characters in their own ongoing titles. The series began in March–April 1956 and saw the first appearance of several major characters including the Silver Age Flash, the Challengers of the Unknown, Space Ranger, Adam Strange, Rip Hunter, the Silver Age Green Lantern, the Sea Devils, the Silver Age Atom, the Metal Men, the Inferior Five, the Creeper, Anthro, Hawk and Dove, Angel and the Ape, the Silver Age Spectre, and Bat Lash.

In 1962, DC purchased an adaptation of the James Bond novel and film Dr. No, which had been published in British Classics Illustrated, and published it as an issue of Showcase. It was the first American comic book appearance of the character.

Showcase stood out from other tryout series in that it maintained its own readership; readers who liked a feature would buy the series when it came out, but would often continue buying Showcase as well. The series was canceled in 1970 with issue #93, featuring Manhunter 2070.

=== Full list of issues ===
Issue #	Character	Notes
1	The Fire Fighters	
2	The Kings of the Wild	
3	The Frogmen	
4	The Flash (Barry Allen)	DC editor Julius Schwartz assigned writer Robert Kanigher and artists Carmine Infantino and Joe Kubert to the company's first attempt at reviving superheroes: an updated version of the Flash that would appear in Showcase #4 (October 1956). The eventual success of the new, science-fiction oriented Flash heralded the wholesale return of superheroes, and the beginning of what fans and historians call the Silver Age of Comic Books.
5	The Manhunters	
6–7	The Challengers of the Unknown	Created by Jack Kirby.
8	The Flash (Barry Allen)	
9–10	Lois Lane	Lois Lane was featured in a tryout for her own series.
11–12	The Challengers of the Unknown	
13–14	The Flash (Barry Allen)	
15–16	Space Ranger	Created by Gardner Fox, Edmond Hamilton and Bob Brown.
17–19	Adventures on Other Worlds (Adam Strange)	Adam Strange was created by Gardner Fox and Mike Sekowsky.
20–21	Rip Hunter, Time Master	Created by Jack Miller and Ruben Moreira.
22–24	Green Lantern (Hal Jordan)	The Silver Age Green Lantern was launched by John Broome and Gil Kane.
25–26	Rip Hunter, Time Master	
27–29	The Sea Devils	Robert Kanigher and Russ Heath created the Sea Devils, a team of scuba-diving adventurers.
30–33	Aquaman and Aqualad	
34–36	The Atom (Ray Palmer)	The Silver Age Atom was created by Gardner Fox and Gil Kane.
37–40	The Metal Men	Robert Kanigher and artist Ross Andru co-created the Metal Men.
41–42	Tommy Tomorrow of the Planeteers	
43	James Bond (adaptation of Dr. No)	Comic book adaptation of the 1962 James Bond film.
44	Tommy Tomorrow of the Planeteers	
45	Sgt. Rock	
46–47	Tommy Tomorrow of the Planeteers	
48–49	Cave Carson: Adventures Inside Earth	
50–51	I—Spy	
52	Cave Carson: Adventures Inside Earth	
53–54	G.I. Joe	
55–56	Doctor Fate and the Hourman	
57–58	The Enemy Ace	
59	The Teen Titans	
60–61	The Spectre	Revival of the character by Gardner Fox and Murphy Anderson.
62–63	The Inferior Five	E. Nelson Bridwell and Joe Orlando created the Inferior Five.
64	The Spectre	
65	The Inferior Five	
66–67	B'wana Beast	Bob Haney and Mike Sekowsky created B'wana Beast.
68–69	The Maniaks	A fictional rock band published by created by E. Nelson Bridwell and Mike Sekowsky.
70	Leave It to Binky	
71	The Maniaks with Woody Allen	
72	Top Gun	
73	Beware the Creeper	Steve Ditko created the Creeper with scripter Don Segall.
74	Anthro	
75	The Hawk and the Dove	Steve Ditko created the quirky team of superhero brothers called the Hawk and the Dove with writer Steve Skeates.
76	Bat Lash	Western character by Nick Cardy and Sergio Aragonés.
77	Angel and the Ape	E. Nelson Bridwell and Bob Oksner created Angel and the Ape.
78	Jonny Double	
79	The Dolphin	
80	The Phantom Stranger	Reprints from The Phantom Stranger (vol. 1) #2 and Star Spangled Comics #122, with a new framing story by Mike Friedrich and Jerry Grandenetti.
81	The Way-Out World of Windy and Willy	
82–84	Nightmaster	
85–87	Firehair	
88–90	Jason's Quest	
91–93	Manhunter 2070	

=== Reprint collections ===
In 1992, DC Comics published a trade paperback reprint collection titled The Essential Showcase: 1956–1959 (ISBN 978-1-56389-079-6). This collection reprints selected stories/characters from issues #1, 4, 6, 9, 11, 13, and 17 of the original Showcase series. Several other issues were included in other reprint collections.

Title	Issues collected	Publication date	ISBN
Showcase Presents: Showcase Vol.1	#1–21	July 2012	1-4012-3523-9
Showcase Presents: The Flash Vol. 1	#4, 8, 13–14	May 2007	1-4012-1327-8
The Flash Archives Vol. 1	#4, 8, 13–14	May 1998	978-1-56389-139-7
The Flash Chronicles Vol. 1	#4, 8, 13–14	September 2009	978-1-4012-2471-4
Flash Rogues: Captain Cold	#8	August 2018	978-1-4012-8159-5
Showcase Presents: Superman Family Vol. 1	#9 (Lois Lane solo story)	March 2006	1-4012-0787-1
Showcase Presents: Superman Family Vol. 2	#10 (Lois Lane solo story)	February 2008	1-4012-1656-0
Showcase Presents: Challengers of the Unknown Vol. 1	#6–7, 11–12	September 2006	1-4012-1087-2
Challengers of the Unknown Archives Vol. 1	#6–7, 11–12	July 2003	1-56389-997-3
Adam Strange Archives Vol. 1	#17–19	March 2004	1-4012-0148-2
Showcase Presents: Rip Hunter, Time Master Vol. 1	#20–21, 25–26	August 2012	1-4012-3521-2
Showcase Presents: Green Lantern Vol. 1	22–24	October 2005	1-4012-0759-6
Green Lantern Archives Vol. 1	22–24	1993	978-1-56389-087-1
The Green Lantern Chronicles Vol. 1	#22–24	May 2009	978-1-4012-2163-8
Showcase Presents: Sea Devils, Vol. 1	#27–29	July 2012	1-4012-3522-0
Aquaman Archives Vol. 1	#30–31	February 2003	978-1-56389-943-0
Showcase Presents: The Atom Vol. 1	#34–36	June 2007	1-4012-1363-4
The Atom Archives Vol. 1	#34–36	July 2001	978-1-56389-717-7
Showcase Presents: Metal Men Vol. 1	#37–40	September 2007	1-4012-1559-9
Metal Men Archives Vol. 1	#37–40	May 2006	1-4012-0774-X
Crisis on Multiple Earths: The Team-Ups Vol. 1	#55–56	January 2006	978-1-4012-0470-9
Showcase Presents: Enemy Ace Vol. 1	#57–58	February 2008	1-4012-1721-4
Showcase Presents: Teen Titans Vol. 1	#59	April 2006	1-4012-0788-X
Silver Age Teen Titans Archives Vol. 1	#59	October 2003	978-1-4012-0071-8
Showcase Presents: The Spectre Vol. 1	#60–61, 64	May 2012	1-4012-3417-8
The Creeper by Steve Ditko	#73	April 2010	978-1-4012-2591-9
Showcase Presents: Bat Lash Vol. 1	#76	July 2009	1-4012-2295-1
Showcase Presents: Phantom Stranger Vol. 1	#80	October 2006	1-4012-1088-0

== Revival ==
In August 1977, Showcase was revived for 11 issues after the cancellation of 1st Issue Special, which ran from 1975 to 1976. Writer Paul Kupperberg reminisced, "1977 was an expansionary time at DC, and Jenette Kahn was supportive of trying new things. There were a lot of new ideas being thrown around at that time. A lot of books came around, lasted a few issues, and then went away. [DC] decided to create Showcase for the very same reason it was originally created, to have a place to experiment, and if [the feature] sold, great. If not, they were already on to the next idea."[emphasis in original]

The revived Showcase, using the original numbering, began with issue #94 and published the first appearance of the new Doom Patrol and the solo adventures of Power Girl. Issue #100 (May 1978) had a cameo by almost every character that had premiered in the original run of Showcase in a story co-written by Paul Kupperberg and Paul Levitz and drawn by Joe Staton. The series was cancelled again after issue #104 (September 1978), as part of what is commonly called the "DC Implosion". Issues #105 and #106 saw print in Cancelled Comic Cavalcade and #105 was later published in Adventure Comics. Issue #106 was included in The Creeper by Steve Ditko hardcover collection published by DC in 2010. Two other series were announced before the series cancellation: The Huntress, which would have spun out of her feature in Batman Family; and World of Krypton, which was published as DC's first miniseries in 1979. According to editor Paul Levitz, at the time of the cancellation, there were still no Huntress stories in production; further, the slated content for Showcase #107–109 was Gerry Conway's Western adventure The Deserter.

=== Full list of issues ===
Issue #	Character
94–96	The Doom Patrol
97–99	Power Girl
100	Special issue featuring almost every character from issues #1–93.
101–103	Hawkman
104	OSS / Spies at War
105	Deadman
106	The Creeper

=== Reprint collections ===
Title	Issues collected	Publication date	ISBN
Power Girl	#97–99	June 2006	978-1-4012-0968-1
The Creeper by Steve Ditko	unpublished issue #106	April 2010	978-1-4012-2591-9

== New Talent Showcase ==
DC published New Talent Showcase, which ran for 15 issues (Jan. 1984 – March 1985), briefly changed its title to Talent Showcase, and then ended with issue #19 (Oct. 1985). For the most part edited by Karen Berger (and for a short time by Sal Amendola), the series gave new writers and artists their first professional opportunity in the comics industry. Notable creators who made their DC debuts with New Talent Showcase include Mark Beachum, Norm Breyfogle, Tom Grindberg, Steve Lightle, Mindy Newell, and Stan Woch. Per editorial policy, the series featured only new characters.

== Showcase '93-'96 ==
DC revived the Showcase title in 1993 when the 1950s retailer reluctance to order new, untested series had largely vanished; it was replaced in the 1990s with reader enthusiasm for the "#1" issues of new series. The new series was published as Showcase '93, a monthly 12-issue miniseries, replaced yearly by Showcase '94, '95 and '96; each was also a miniseries lasting 12 issues.

For the first two years (1993–1994), Showcase featured characters and concepts from the Batman family of titles with an emphasis on villain-centric one-off stories. The 1994 Azrael series launched out of Showcase '94 with #10 while a prototype story for what became the Birds of Prey ongoing appeared in Showcase '96 #3. The series also had a series of crossover tie-ins. Showcase '93 had a two-part crossover with the "Knightfall" storyline set while Batman recovered from having his back broken by Bane, which revealed a previously untold story from earlier in the "Knightfall" storyline where Batman fought Two-Face. Showcase '94 #4-5 were part of a crossover with Robin, involving Tim Drake and Huntress fighting a masked priest/vigilante attempting to eliminate his evil mob boss sister's criminal empire. Showcase '94 #8-9 featured a prelude to Zero Hour: Crisis in Time! that featured Monarch's transformation into Extant and #10 featured a crossover story involving Clock King fighting a series of temporal dopplegangers during "Zero Hour" while trying to obtain a powerful time travel artifact.

With the 1995-1996 Showcase series, the focus switched from Batman characters to Superman characters. This included a story involving the Matrix Supergirl that led into her ongoing series written by Peter David (Showcase '96 #8) and a two-part story involving the post-Zero Hour Legion of Super-Heroes (#11-12) which featured the first post-Zero Hour meeting of Brainiac 5 and his ancestor Vril Dox and the villain Brainiac, which ultimately served as the final storyline as the series was canceled with #12.

== Showcase Presents ==
In 2005, DC began publishing thick, black-and-white reprints of older material under the umbrella title Showcase Presents.
