= List of comics solicited but never published =

Comic book stories, issues of comic book limited/ongoing series, or even entire comic book series were written or promoted and solicited for release but, for various reasons, were never published. Some were eventually reprinted elsewhere or published in different forms.

== Acclaim Comics ==
- Quantum and Woody #22–31 – This series was cancelled by Acclaim after #17 (June 1998), and "uncancelled" 15 months later; as a promotional gimmick, #32 (September 1999) was published to show how the story would have developed if the comic had never been cancelled. In October 1999, the series resumed numbering with #18 and was intended to publish the "missing" issues, but the title was cancelled with issue #21.
- Unity 2000 #4–6 – Only three issues of this six-issue miniseries were published before its cancellation.

== Alternative Comics ==
- Detour #2 – Publisher Alternative Comics solicited Ed Brubaker's Detour #2 in 2000, but it never appeared (the first issue had been published in 1997). In 2000, Brubaker promised that "the stories that would have made up the next two issues are being worked on in my disappearing spare time, and hopefully the whole thing will be released as a book of about 100 or so pages in a year or two". Instead, Brubaker embarked in earnest on a mainstream comics writing career with Deadenders (Vertigo Comics), whose dystopic future backdrop was similar to Detour's.

== Archie Comics ==
- Sonic the Hedgehog (Archie Comics) - In July 2017, Sega announced the discontinuation of their business relationship with Archie Comics, ending their publication of all Sonic the Hedgehog comics. This led to a series of trade paperbacks and reprints being cancelled, as well as the main comic abruptly ending in the middle of an arc, which upcoming issues had art at various stages of completion before the book was pulled.
- Sonic Universe - The spin-off comic was originally scheduled to feature an epilogue to the unfinished Sonic Underground for its 50th issue. However, for unknown reasons this was replaced with a story focusing on one of Sonic's long-running enemies, Metal Sonic. The Underground Epilogue was put on hold indefinitely, due to Sega not permitting the show be featured in the comics.
- Teenage Mutant Ninja Turtles Adventures - A story arc titled The Forever War was originally planned to begin with issue #71 but the two-part “How the Turtles Got Their Weapons” story was published instead. It was later planned to be published in 2009, before it was ultimately cancelled again.

== Blackthorne Publishing ==
- Battle Beasts #5–6 – Based on the action figure line by Hasbro, this title was to run through at least issue #6. The final issue of the series was #4 and ended on a cliffhanger.
- Nightmare on Elm Street in 3-D – An ongoing series written by Andy Mangels set to begin in August 1989. The first five issues were to adapt the first five films in the franchise, while subsequent issues would have featured new stories. Mangels later wrote an Elm Street series for Innovation Publishing from 1991 to 1992.
- Star Wars 3-D #4–7 – Four subsequent issues of this series were planned to be released in 1989 starting in January. The last published issue was #3, released in 1988.
- Transformers 3-D #4–5 – A three-part storyline in which the Autobots and Decepticons face off against a group of beings known as the Destructons was to begin in 1988. Issue #3 contained the first part of the story, but that was the last issue of the series.

== Boom! Studios ==
- Bee and PuppyCat - A tie-in comic book published through its KaBOOM! imprint, the comic was canceled after #11 in 2016 despite issues #12–#16 having already been solicited. Preview catalogues that year listed issues #12–#16, along with cover art and synopses.

== Charlton Comics ==
- Blue Beetle (Vol. 5) - A series in 1967 by Steve Ditko, it ran for five issues until the entire Charlton "Action Heroes" line of comic books ceased publication in 1968. The story planned for a sixth issue was eventually printed, without coloring, in the fan publication Charlton Portfolio #1 in 1974.
- Charlton Bullseye Special #2–3 – Issue #2 was to be an all-humor book set for release in February 1987, but later pushed back to June. The issue was to contain an Atomic Mouse story by Jim O'Donnelly and Mike Todd, as well as Steve Hauk's "Emperor of da Universe" and Bill Witz's "Murth Man". Issue #3 was originally going to preview a revival of the Charlton Comics title Creepy Things, but the contents of the book changed as Creepy Things was to receive its own title in October 1987.
- Doctor Morpheus – A six-issue miniseries written by Kent Orlando which was a combination of pulp adventure and science fiction.
- The Return of the Vengeance Squad – At least four issues were planned for this revival of Charlton's Vengeance Squad series, to be written by T.C. Ford and drawn by Amanda Conner.

== Comico ==
- Max Headroom and Max Headroom 3-D – An ongoing series and one-shot 3-D comic, the latter written by William Messner-Loebs and illustrated by the Pander Brothers, were planned for the TV character. The cancellation of Max Headroom put the release of the ongoing on hold.

== Comics Interview Publications ==
- Battle Axe #2–6 – "Berzerker", written by Gary Carlson and pencilled by Angel Medina, was slated to run for the first four issues; "Thorrn: Cursed Warrior", written by Ed DeGeorge, Chris Ecker, and Carlson and pencilled by Stan Timmons, was to run through issue #6. The series never got past issue #1.

== CrossGen Comics ==
- CrossGen's bankruptcy led to a number of titles—including Sojourn, Negation War, and Brath—being cancelled before completion. Several trade paperback collections were cancelled due to the bankruptcy as well.

== Dark Horse Comics ==
- ARMS - In 2017, a graphic novel based on Arms written by Ian Flynn was under production. While an introductory Free Comic Book Day issue saw release, the comic was reportedly cancelled in March 2021.
- Overwatch: First Strike - A graphic novel titled Overwatch: First Strike was teased by Blizzard in 2016, but it was ultimately scrapped. Posting on Overwatch's official forums, Michael Chu stated that Blizzard decided to cancel First Strike due to considerable changes made to the narrative and characters of Overwatch since First Strike was first conceived. The novel was to be penned by writer Micky Neilson and artist Ludo Lullabi.

== DC Comics ==
- Action Comics Annual #3 by Chris Claremont and Michael Golden – The original story for this annual was meant to be published in 1990. According to Amazing Heroes Preview Special #10 (February 1990): "And the X-citing news is about the Action Comics Annual, due out this year. It's written by none other than Marvel Mutant Man Chris Claremont, and drawn by not-often-seen Michael Golden. Watch for it". An annual with this number was eventually released in 1991 as part of the Armageddon 2001 crossover event, but contained a different story and was written by Roger Stern.
- All Star Batgirl – This series was announced at the Toronto Comic Book Expo in 2006. Geoff Johns and J. G. Jones were planning to work on the first six issues, which would present a connection between Barbara Gordon and Arkham Asylum. According to Johns, the series would feature "a mystery centering around Barbara Gordon's transformation into Batgirl", as in Batman: The Long Halloween. The title was described as not taking place in the continuity of All Star Batman and Robin the Boy Wonder.
- All Star Comics: "The Will of William Wilson" – An unpublished Justice Society of America story from the 1940s by writer Gardner Fox. A good amount of artwork from this story survived and has been reprinted in various publications from TwoMorrows Publishing. In addition, there were three other unused Justice Society scripts penned by Fox - "The Men of Magnifica", "The Emperors of Japan", and "Peril of the Paper Death".
- All Star Wonder Woman – This series was confirmed at San Diego Comic-Con in 2006, with Adam Hughes announced as writer and artist. Hughes intended to retell the character's origin story, and described his approach to the series as an "iconic interpretation" of the character, but explained at the 2010 San Diego Comic-Con that the project was "in the freezer" for the time being, due to the difficulty involved in both writing and illustrating it himself. As of October 2010, a page on his website indicated that after the current Catwoman series ended with issue #82, Hughes would cease his DC cover work and focus on producing the six-issue All Star Wonder Woman series.
- Ambush Bug: Year None #6 – A six-issue miniseries, it skipped issue #6 and concluded with issue #7 instead. There was an 11-month gap between #5 (January 2009) and 7 (December 2009).
- Aquaman II miniseries – A miniseries by writer Neal Pozner and artist Craig Hamilton was published in 1986. A follow-up miniseries was planned, but cancelled due to Hamilton's difficulties with meeting deadlines.
- Batman: Dark Detective III – In 1977, writer Steve Englehart and artists Marshall Rogers and Terry Austin collaborated on a run of Batman stories in Detective Comics #469-476. A six-issue sequel miniseries titled Batman: Dark Detective was published in 2005. Englehart and Rogers planned a third series of stories, but Rogers' death on March 25, 2007, caused DC to cancel the project.
- Batman: The Art of Neal Adams – A collection of Adams' best Batman stories, including a cover gallery, was set for October 1992. Comprehensive collections of Adams' Batman work would later be released by DC beginning in the 2000s.
- Batman: The Brave and the Bold – Paul Kupperberg wrote two unused stories for this tie-in to the animated series of the same name featuring Plastic Man and Guy Gardner as co-stars.
- Batman: The Widening Gyre #7–12 – In 2010 Kevin Smith wrote a six-issue Batman miniseries called The Widening Gyre, drawn by Walt Flanagan. The series was initially planned as 12 issues, with a long break planned between issues #6 and 7. After issue #6 was published, Smith and Flanagan's work on their reality show, Comic Book Men, extended this planned break further than expected. It was decided in the interim to release the remaining issues as a separate six-issue miniseries to be called Batman: Bellicosity and scheduled for 2014 but, as of 2025, it remains unpublished.
- Batman the Barbarian and Batman: Nightfire: Two Elseworlds stories announced in 2023 but have not had a new release date as of today.
- Batwoman miniseries – A miniseries created and written by Dennis O'Neil was planned around the time of Batman's 50th anniversary in 1989. It involved a new Batwoman character described as having more of a motivation to fight crime than the previous Batgirl (Barbara Gordon) and possibly even Batman himself.
- Batwoman #25-26 - In September 2013, J. H. Williams III and Haden Blackman announced their intention to leave Batwoman with issue 26, citing last-minute editorial changes as the reason, remarking that they were not allowed to expand Killer Croc's back story, keep their original ending to their current story arc, or depict Kate and Maggie Sawyer getting married. DC Comics responded that Batwoman could not get married because "heroes shouldn't have happy personal lives". Writer Marc Andreyko, who is openly gay himself, took over the title with issue 25, which featured a "Batman: Zero Year" tie-in. This creative change interrupted the finale to Williams' and Blackman's work on the title; they had already written issues 25 and 26 prior to their departure. Andreyko resolved Batwoman #24's cliffhanger ending in Batwoman Annual #1.
- Before Watchmen: Epilogue – Originally solicited in 2013 as the conclusion to the Watchmen prequels, this one-shot issue was cancelled for unknown reasons.
- Black Canary miniseries – A miniseries by writer Greg Weisman and artist Mike Sekowsky was planned in 1984. The first issue of the series was pencilled, but the project was ultimately shelved due to the character being used in writer/artist Mike Grell's high-profile three-issue miniseries Green Arrow: The Longbow Hunters. Elements from the ill-fated project were used for Weisman's DC Showcase: Green Arrow short film.
- Blue Beetle direct market series – Following the cancellation of Blue Beetle's general market series in the late 1980s, a direct market-only series was set to follow. Originally, the plan was to end the first series with issue #21, but the planned follow-up was cancelled as well, due to the belief that there was no audience for a "1960s-type" character like Blue Beetle; as a result, the series ended with issue #24.
- Blue Devil #32–36 – Blue Devil #31 was to be the beginning of a six-part storyline intended to revive the title, but it became the final issue of the series instead, presumably containing elements of the unpublished story.
- Captain Atom graphic novel – A Cary Bates/Pat Broderick graphic novel was listed as "upcoming" in Amazing Heroes Preview Special #10, but was described as being on "permanent hiatus" in the following issue.
- Captain Atom miniseries – A six-issue Captain Atom miniseries was planned to begin in July 1992. Following the events of Armageddon 2001 and Armageddon: The Alien Agenda, Captain Atom was to fake his own death and give up being a superhero, but still had to face the problems associated with his former life. Jonathan Peterson was to write and Michael Netzer and Art Nichols were to be the artists.
- Checkmate Annual #1 – A 64-page annual was planned for 1989 featuring information about the fictional agency and its members, with a backup story involving the character Judomaster.
- Comics Cavalcade Weekly – Dave Gibbons provided the cover art for an unpublished comic featuring Superman and the newly acquired Charlton Comics heroes. The series, a weekly anthology, was to appear in 1985 and also tentatively titled Blockbuster, but was presumably shelved following the launch of ongoing series for two of the featured characters, Blue Beetle and Question.
- Crisis on Captive Earth/Crisis of the Soul – Originally proposed as a 12-issue follow-up to Crisis on Infinite Earths, this story was developed by Paul Levitz, Len Wein, and Jerry Ordway, based on a pitch by Levitz. The main antagonists were the Corrupter, "a living catalyst for evil" who possesses a mysterious gem with ties to Gemworld, and the Manipulator, a rich and powerful man with "much potential for good and evil" who is secretly building a prison for super-villains. Plot points for the story would have included the creation of a new, U.S. government-sanctioned Justice League of America as the only official super-team, a new Freedom Fighters team made up of former Justice League, Titans, Legion of Super-Heroes, Outsiders and Infinity, Inc. members being formed, Star City being destroyed, Elongated Man being forced to kill to save his wife Sue Dibny, and Catwoman, Creeper and Red Tornado, among others, turning evil. Editorial issues led to the project's failure. While thought to have influenced Legends, according to then DC editor Robert Greenberger, no elements of Crisis of the Soul made their way into Legends.
- Cyborg (vol. 2) #24-25 - Cyborg was cancelled with issue 20, but then revived three months later with #21 by Marv Wolfman, only to be concluded in June 2018 with the release of issue 23 ending on a cliffhanger despite the next two issues having been solicited.
- DC Comics Classics Library: Shazam! and the Monster Society of Evil – A hardcover reprint of this Golden Age storyline was cancelled in 2009.
- DC Comics Presents: "In Homage" – A Superman/Thriller story by Robert Loren Fleming and Keith Giffen that was to be produced in the late fall of 1985.
- DC Comics Presents Annual by Marv Wolfman, George Pérez, and Romeo Tanghal – The Teen Titans were supposed to appear in a DC Comics Presents annual planned for 1984. That year saw the release of DC Comics Presents Annual #3, but it featured Captain Marvel as Superman's co-star. The Wolfman story may have been used for 1985's New Teen Titans Annual #1 as it guest-starred Superman, although the artists were Ed Hannigan and Mike DeCarlo.
- DC Double Comics Starring Supergirl and Superboy – After Supergirl's cancellation with issue #23 and the planned cancellation of The New Adventures of Superboy after issue #55, both characters were slated to be published together in a 48-page follow-up series. Paul Kupperberg was to write both heroes, with art from Eduardo Barreto and Bob Oksner on the former and Carmine Infantino and Klaus Janson on the latter. The Superboy title was cancelled after issue #54 despite the next issue already being scripted, and the DC Double Comics series was halted due to the events of Crisis on Infinite Earths, which led to both characters being written out of continuity.
- The "DC Implosion" – During the "DC Implosion", several DC Comics titles were abruptly cancelled, even though a number of the series had issues already completed and ready to be published. Eventually, DC Comics reprinted the stories in black and white to secure their copyright, under the title Cancelled Comic Cavalcade, though this was a limited print run and was not available for sale. A few of the stories were published in other DC comics titles, though some were re-edited prior to publication.
- The Dead Lady of Clown Town – A Cordwainer Smith story optioned by DC for their line of classic science fiction adaptations. Elaine Lee and Michael Kaluta were the creative team slated to produce the story.
- Firestorm: Corona – A graphic novel by Gerry Conway and Pat Broderick originally scheduled for Fall 1984 that was never published. According to Conway, the story for the graphic novel was completed, and a panel from the book appeared in Amazing Heroes Preview Special #1.
- The Flash by Len Wein and Marv Wolfman – An entry in the Winter 1986 Amazing Heroes Preview Special describes a new Flash series by Len Wein and Marv Wolfman. The main character is S.T.A.R. Labs technician MacKenzie Ryan, who possesses energy manipulation powers instead of superhuman speed. The book was removed from DC's schedule. A Flash series would be released the following year written by Mike Baron, starring former Kid Flash Wally West.
- The Flash (vol. 3) #13 – In response to a fan question on its blog "The Source" 's Flashpoint Friday feature, DC announced that May 2011's The Flash #12 would be the final issue of the series. At the time, no other details were provided.
- Freaks by John Byrne – Freaks appeared in a lithography plate published within the History of the DC Universe Portfolio in 1986. Byrne had originally pitched the series to DC, but the series for some reason never surfaced. With some changes, Byrne's concept fit in with his 2112 work to become the John Byrne's Next Men series published by Dark Horse Comics.
- Generations original plan – Generation Zero and Generation One were part of the original plans for DC's Generations event, which were changed after the departure of DC publisher Dan DiDio.
- The Great Ten #10 – Although The Great Ten (by Tony Bedard and Scott McDaniel) was solicited and advertised as being a 10-issue miniseries, with each issue focusing on a different character, DC chose to end the series at #9 due to low sales.
- Green Lantern: "Emerald Interlude" – A three-issue follow-up to the "Emerald Twilight" storyline by Paul Kupperberg, Peter Doherty, and Josef Rubinstein. It was planned to appear in Legends of the DC Universe before that title's cancellation.
- Green Lantern: "Emerald Twilight" by Gerard Jones – The original storyline for "Emerald Twilight" (which was written by Jones and set to run in Green Lantern vol. 3 #48–50) involved a conflict between two separate groups of the Guardians of the Universe, and members of the Green Lantern Corps choosing sides. Though this story was advertised and solicited, it was not considered interesting enough by editor Kevin Dooley, and was replaced with a different story (scripted by Ron Marz) that had Hal Jordan becoming Parallax and destroying the Corps. Jones' version of "Emerald Twilight" has not been published.
- Green Lantern: "Eyes of the Beholders" – An inventory story by Paul Kupperberg with art by Rick Stasi and Bruce Patterson, which features various Justice League members recalling their earliest experiences with Green Lantern. Kupperberg published the script for this story in his book Son of the Unpublished Comic Book Scripts of Paul Kupperberg.
- Green Lantern: "The Image" – During Len Wein and Dave Gibbons' run on Green Lantern in the 1980s, Wein planned to introduce a superhero called Image whom he wanted to include in a potential spin-off. Despite being promoted in Amazing Heroes and DC's own preview comic DC Sampler, the character never appeared during their run.
- Green Lantern Saga – A miniseries about the origins and history of the Green Lantern Corps, the Guardians of the Universe, and the planet Oa was planned for 1990. Science fiction authors such as Larry Niven were scheduled to write the series. Niven later wrote the 1992 one-shot Green Lantern: Ganthet's Tale.
- Hellbent/King Hell – A two-issue miniseries and crossover by Rick Veitch that was planned for Summer 1989 and was going to tie into DC's mature titles at the time such as Green Arrow, Hellblazer, The Question, Sandman, and Swamp Thing. The story was to involve the aftermath of Lucifer's stepping down as ruler of Hell, with one plot point involving the birth of the Swamp Thing's daughter Tefé Holland. A contract dispute with DC led Veitch to pull out of the crossover.
- Holy Terror, Batman! – A proposed 122-page graphic novel by Frank Miller, announced in 2006, but no longer a project associated with the Batman character or DC Comics. In 2010 Miller said that he was no longer working on the project. He stated in June the same year that Holy Terror was in progress, but without Batman. The book was eventually released by Legendary Comics as Holy Terror.
- Hybrid – An ongoing series was planned for the Teen Titans foes, the Hybrid, for 1993, with Len Wein as the writer and Art Nichols and George Pérez as the artists.
- Infinity, Inc.: The Generations Saga Vol. 2 – A hardcover book containing issues #5–18 and Annual #1 was solicited for release for July 2012, but was cancelled.
- JLA/Avengers – In 1983, Roy Thomas and Gerry Conway were to be the co-writers of a JLA/Avengers intercompany crossover drawn by George Pérez. Editorial disputes between DC and Marvel caused the project's cancellation. It was not until 2003 that a crossover between the two teams was published, albeit in a completely different story by Kurt Busiek and Pérez. All of the original story's existing penciled art was published in the hardcover collection of the 2003 JLA/Avengers crossover.
- Justice League International – Following the three Justice League series being published at the time (Justice League America, Justice League Europe, and Justice League International Quarterly), a fourth series starring the Injustice League was in the planning stages for 1991, as well as a series featuring the Conglomerate, the superhero team which premiered in the first issue of the Quarterly title.
- Justice League of America – A story about the last case of the original Justice League of America by William Messner-Loebs and Adam Kubert. Listed in 1989's Amazing Heroes #157, DC declared it a "dead" project.
- Larry Harmon's Laurel and Hardy #2 – In 1972, DC published a single issue of a comic book series based on the Laurel and Hardy cartoon series produced by Larry Harmon. The cover for the unpublished second issue appears in The DC Vault.
- The Legend of King Arthur and the Knights of the Round Table by Gerry Conway and Nestor Redondo – House advertisements in DC Comics cover-dated September 1975 promoted a four-part King Arthur miniseries to be published in the Treasury Edition format.
- Legion of Super-Heroes Annual (vol. 3) #5 – A Legion annual was planned to appear in the late spring of 1989 featuring a Brainiac 5 lead story, an unspecified solo backup story, and new and updated Who's Who entries.
- Lobo: Frag Race 2000 – A four-issue miniseries written by Keith Giffen and Alan Grant with art by Simon Bisley that was scheduled to ship in fall 1992.
- Lobo: The Hand-To-Hand Job – Alternatively called Lobo-By-Blows, The Hand Job or It's A Man's World, Alan Grant's one-shot Lobo story, described as a parody of Hugh Hefner's life with art by Frank Quitely was allegedly completely penciled and then shelved by DC. In recent times, Quitely claimed he was asked by DC about his pages, and expressed his intent to redraw the story and print both the old and new versions of it.
- Marvel and DC Present The Uncanny X-Men and The New Teen Titans #2 – A sequel to the popular X-Men/New Teen Titans crossover was initially announced in the letters page of New Teen Titans #29 and scheduled for release around Christmas 1983. It was planned to feature Marv Wolfman as writer and George Pérez as artist, with the villains in the story being Brother Blood and the Hellfire Club. Plans for the book were eventually cancelled because of the problems that affected the JLA/Avengers crossover.
- Metal Men miniseries – A 1984 miniseries by Robert Kanigher and Irv Novick would have involved the Metal Men starring in their own movie. DC never put the book on their schedule.
- Metropolis by Steve Gerber and Frank Miller – The "line name" for a proposed revamp of Superman, Batman and Wonder Woman.
- Mr. Monster/Swamp Thing – An intercompany crossover between DC and Eclipse Comics was anticipated for late fall of 1986, then later scheduled for 1988. The crossover was to be co-written by Michael T. Gilbert and Alan Moore with art by Gilbert, Stephen R. Bissette, and John Totleben.
- New Teen Titans: Genesis – A reprint of the first appearances of the New Teen Titans by Marv Wolfman and George Pérez was planned to ship in September 1992.
- Nightwing miniseries by Art Thibert – Nightwing's first miniseries was planned to be written and drawn by Art Thibert and dealt with Nightwing's personal struggles while tracking down the person responsible for putting his girlfriend Starfire in a coma. Instead, a different series by Dennis O'Neil and Greg Land was released in 1995.
- Nightwing (Vol. 3) #30 - Originally solicited with wrting by James Tynion IV and art by Meghan Hetrick, it was delayed a month and a half before releasing with a completely changed staff and story. Hetrick would later sell the unused inked pages on her website.
- The Outsiders new format series – The Outsiders #28 (a Millennium crossover) was the final issue of the book, but was going to be replaced with a "new format" series in 1988. A new Outsiders title would not come out until 1993.
- Pandora Pann – Most of the preview story for this series by writer Len Wein and artist Ross Andru (scheduled to be printed in Saga of the Swamp Thing #5) was pencilled, but for unknown reasons the series never materialized.
- Power Squad – An all-female super team named the "Power Squad" was proposed by Jack C. Harris and Trevor Von Eeden, but the idea was not approved for publication.
- Red Hood (2025) - A Red Hood ongoing series for mature readers series set after the events of the H2SH event, written by Gretchen Felker-Martin, was planned. On the day of the first issue's release of September 10, 2025, Felker-Martin joked on Bluesky about the assassination of Charlie Kirk. This prompted DC to cancel the series after one issue and offer retailers a refund on any unsold copies. Jeff Spokes would soon after start selling original artwork pages from the next two solicited issues as well as a fourth, unsolicited one.
- Robotech Defenders #3 – This series, based on the Revell line of plastic models, was originally scheduled as a three-part miniseries in 1985. It was reduced to the first normal-sized issue and a 32-page second issue with no advertisements.
- Salvo – A series by writer Steven Grant and artists Pat Gabrielle and Mike DeCarlo, which was described by editor Michael Golden as "The Punisher as done by Lucy and Desi", was planned for early 1993.
- Secret Origins (vol. 2) – Following the series' cancellation after issue #50, further annuals and specials were planned. In addition, stories were planned for Jericho in issue #6, Aquaman and the Ray in issue #30, a post-Crisis on Infinite Earths update of past Justice League/Justice Society team-ups in Annual #2, Geo-Force and Terra in issue #49, and Dial H for Hero, the Space Canine Patrol Agents, and Ultra the Multi-Alien in other issues. Also, the story of the Legion of Super-Heroes' clubhouse from issue #46 was originally a different tale drawn by Kurt Schaffenberger which was tied to Superman's pre-Crisis history, and was replaced by the Curt Swan-drawn version which saw print.
- Seventh Generation – A six-issue crossover series planned for 1989, but was canceled due to DC's plans for the release of Batman that year.
- The Shadow #20–24 – Andy Helfer and Kyle Baker's run on The Shadow was planned to end with issue #24. The series was cancelled after issue #19.
- Shazam! miniseries and ongoing series by Roy Thomas – A Roy Thomas/Don Newton Shazam! miniseries was planned for 1984 or 1985, in which Captain Marvel meets a black superhero from Earth-1 who also received his powers from the wizard Shazam. Thomas later co-wrote a Captain Marvel miniseries in 1987, Shazam!: The New Beginning, although the art was by Tom Mandrake following Newton's death in 1984. In addition, an Amazing Heroes Preview Special from 1989 contained a short blurb about a possible Shazam! series featuring Thomas' version of the character following his run in Action Comics Weekly. This series never appeared prior to Jerry Ordway's reboot in the 1994 graphic novel The Power of Shazam!.
- Showcase #50: "Yankee Doodle Dandy" – Showcase #50 was to feature the debut of Yankee Doodle Dandy, a spy character created by editor Larry Nadle. Nadle's death caused the story to be shelved, but the character was brought back in 1992 for Grant Morrison's Doom Patrol run.
- The Silver Age by James Robinson – A four-issue follow-up to Robinson's The Golden Age, which was being developed but did not happen. According to Robinson, later books such as JLA: Year One and DC: The New Frontier have since made the series unnecessary.
- Sonic Disruptors #8–12 – This 12-issue miniseries by writer Mike Baron and artist Barry Crain was cancelled after issue #7 due to poor sales. A Sonic Disruptors graphic novel to finish the storyline was also planned with art by Mike Mignola.
- Soul Love – Part of a prospective line of black-and-white magazines geared toward adults, this 1971 Jack Kirby title was supposedly killed because of a possible backlash among Southern retailers.
- Space Ranger miniseries – An eight-issue miniseries starring the science fiction character was to ship in October 1992, written by Michael Jan Friedman and pencilled by John Calimee.
- Spectre by Steve Gerber – Gerber was to have been the writer of the 1980s relaunch of the Spectre series, but scheduling difficulties led DC to replace him with Doug Moench.
- Spectre graphic novel – Roy Thomas was in discussions with Jerry Ordway to do a graphic novel about the Spectre after they completed the America vs. the Justice Society miniseries. Thomas wanted the story to explain the various inconsistencies in how the character was portrayed by different writers over the years.
- Starfire #9 – Starfire #8, which turned out to be the last issue of the series, contained an announcement on the story's final page that the next issue would be released during the second week of September 1977.
- Starman #46 – Solicited as the last issue of the first Starman series, the title was cancelled after issue #45 instead.
- Sugar and Spike (vol. 2) – The series was published in the United States from 1956 through 1971 for 98 issues, when due to creator Sheldon Mayer's failing eyesight that limited his drawing ability, Sugar and Spike ceased to appear. Later, after cataract surgery restored his eyesight, Mayer returned to writing and drawing Sugar and Spike stories, continuing to do so until his death in 1991; these stories appeared in overseas markets and only a few have been reprinted in the United States. The American reprints appeared in the digest sized comics series The Best of DC #29, 41, 47, 58, 65 and 68. Sales on the "Sugar and Spike" issues of The Best of DC were strong enough that DC announced plans for a new ongoing series featuring the characters. The project was never launched for unknown reasons.
- Superman #712 by Chris Roberson – Issue #712 was scheduled to feature a revival of the 1990s supporting character Sinbad. When the issue came out, a previously unreleased story by Kurt Busiek ("Lost Boy: A Tale of Krypto the Superdog", which was originally planned for Superman #659) was published in its place. It was believed that the change was due to Sinbad's Muslim heritage, but DC's explanation was the story did not fit into the ongoing "Grounded" storyline.
- Superman 3-D – According to DC's promotional giveaway brochure DC Releases #46 (March 1988), a Superman 3-D one-shot issue was planned for 1988. It was to be written and penciled by John Byrne and inked by Ty Templeton with 3-D effects by Ray Zone. A "major new Superman foe" named "Tantrum" was to have been introduced. Byrne and Zone would later collaborate on a Batman 3-D graphic novel. A Superman 3-D one-shot was published in December 1998 by a different creative team.
- Superman: An Evening with Superman – A graphic novel by Barry Windsor-Smith entitled "An Evening with Superman" was originally announced by DC in 1998, but has not been published as of 2016. Superman: The Complete History – The Life and Times of the Man of Steel features an excerpt of this story.
- Superman: "Supermite!" – An unpublished 12-page Superman story from 1944 written by Jerry Siegel.
- Superman: "The K-Metal from Krypton" – An unpublished Superman story from 1940 that not only introduced an early version of kryptonite, but had Lois Lane learn that Superman is really Clark Kent. The original script and outline were rediscovered by Mark Waid in 1988 and there was an online effort to restore and publish the story.
- Swamp Angel – A three-issue Prestige format miniseries by Mike Grell which would have told the story of a Southern family beginning with the American Civil War and spanning three generations.
- Swamp Thing (vol. 2) by Neil Gaiman and Jamie Delano – Gaiman and Delano were set to take over writing the ongoing Swamp Thing series following Rick Veitch's run on the book, but bowed out after the controversy over Veitch's Swamp Thing #88. Gaiman's only work on the title appeared in Swamp Thing Annual #5, while Delano's was in Swamp Thing #77.
- Swamp Thing: Deja Vu – A three-issue miniseries was scheduled for 1990 by Len Wein and artist Bernie Wrightson. It was partially drawn by Wrightson before he left the project and there was no attempt to complete the series with another artist. While the pencil pages were later auctioned and shared online, it was announced in 2026 that the surviving material would be officially collected for the first time in the Swamp Thing by Alan Moore Omnibus.
- Tales of the Legion of Super-Heroes #355–360 – DC's Legion reprint title was set to run through at least issue #360, according to the run-down of issues listed in Amazing Heroes Preview Special #5.
- Teen Titans Spotlight – Stories planned for future issues of this Teen Titans anthology series included a Raven and Vigilante two-part story, as well as solo stories starring Cheshire, Doctor Light, Red Star, and Azrael.
- Thriller Special – A Thriller story titled "Naked Steel" by Robert Loren Fleming and Keith Giffen was intended by Fleming to both revive the characters and bring them closer to his original vision. Announced as being released in the summer of 1985, it was later revealed that the announcement was premature and DC never got back to Fleming about the book.
- Tomahawk miniseries – A five-issue miniseries written by William Messner-Loebs and illustrated by Thomas Yeates set in the early days of the American Revolution. Yeates later provided the artwork for the Vertigo Visions – Tomahawk one-shot in 1998, which was written by Rachel Pollack.
- Twilight of the Superheroes – A company-wide crossover and attendant maxiseries proposed by Alan Moore in the late 1980s prior to his public split with DC. The series imagined a dark future where various superhero clans warred for global dominance. Moore's split with DC, as well as the very dark nature of the story, meant that the series never got beyond the proposal stage, although a number of story elements that Moore had suggested were later worked into ongoing series. Moore's proposal was leaked on the Internet in the early 1990s, and the complete text was published by DC in the hardcover DC Through the '80s: The End of Eras in 2020.
- Valda – An aborted Roy Thomas/Todd McFarlane four-issue miniseries spun off from Thomas' Arak, Son of Thunder title.
- Vigilante miniseries – Following Vigilante #50 in 1987, a miniseries was planned for the character, but Vigilante ended up killing himself in that issue and the miniseries never appeared.
- West Coast Teen Titans – In an interview with Amazing Heroes, Marv Wolfman discussed a planned New Teen Titans spin-off set in San Francisco and featuring Cyborg, Red Star, and Chris King from Dial H for Hero as members of the team. Changeling and Thunder and Lightning were also considered for team membership.
- Who's Who in Superman – A Who's Who series tentatively planned in honor of Superman's 50th anniversary in 1988.
- Wonder Woman direct market series – A second Wonder Woman series exclusive to the direct market was planned for late summer of 1984, which was to be written by Steve Gerber and published simultaneously with the then-current Wonder Woman series produced for the general market. Gerber intended to bring the character back to her roots and set the tone of the new book closer to how the original one was written by her creator William Moulton Marston.
- Wonder Woman: Bondage – A proposed project by Bill Sienkiewicz and Frank Miller. Sienkiewicz described it as "perhaps a bit over the top, but I think Frank and I invited that. So was the idea for the series in very basic broad stroke discussions between Frank and I, with some input from then-DC editor Bob Schreck".
- Wonder Woman: Hand of the Gods – A graphic novel that was cancelled in 2011, allegedly due to its artist Justiniano being charged with possession of child pornography.
- Wonder Woman: "Nuclear, the Magnetic Menace" – An unpublished Golden Age Wonder Woman story introduced the villain Nuclear. Even though it was not published, a follow-up story ("Nuclear Returns!") was published in Wonder Woman #43 (September–October 1950). In 1982, Roy Thomas came up with his own introduction story for Nuclear in All-Star Squadron #16. Since then, original artwork from the first story has surfaced.
- Zatanna miniseries – A four-issue miniseries written by Gerry Conway was promoted in Amazing Heroes as coming out in 1984.
- Zero Man – A miniseries written by Len Wein that was projected for 1985 with hopes for an ongoing series if it was successful. The concept involved two men from the 25th century going back in time to the present day – one to change history in order to prevent the country from turning into a totalitarian dictatorship, and the other to make sure the future happens as planned. Although the first issue was pencilled, staff at DC Comics claimed they had no knowledge of the series as of 1986.

=== Milestone Comics ===
- Fade miniseries – Ivan Velez Jr. wrote an outline and three issues for a miniseries starring the character Fade from the team series Blood Syndicate which would have explored the character's childhood, sexuality, and changing powers. Before it could go beyond the proposal stage, the parent title was cancelled due to low sales and the company ceased regular publication.

=== Piranha Press ===
- Boneheads in Ghost Town – A 112-page graphic novel with story and art by Dean Motter to be released by DC's Piranha Press imprint. The story involved aging rock star Frankie Watts and his use of a mysterious drug that makes people become phantom-like. The book was later changed to a two-issue miniseries and scheduled to ship in late 1992.
- The Hip Hop Papers – Graffiti artist Chris Pape was to write and illustrate a semi-autobiographical graphic novel for Piranha Press which was eventually scheduled for late 1992.
- Ice-T's Players – A graphic novel written by Andy Helfer and Ice-T and illustrated by Trevor Von Eeden, this was to be part of a series of officially licensed graphic novels of popular music acts produced by Piranha Press' Piranha Music line. The Ice-T book was to ship in late 1992.
- Skin Brace – A six-issue miniseries set in a dystopian future and written by Lou Stathis and Robert Morales with art by Ho Che Anderson. Kyle Baker would later be listed as the series' artist.
- This Year's Girl – A three-issue miniseries by writer David Quinn and artist Brian Stelfreeze about a pair of sisters who are also assassins.
- Tree of Life – Set in the late 27th century, Tree of Life was a four-issue miniseries by writer Elliot S. Maggin and penciller Randy DuBurke planned for late 1992 which involved the fate of the Jewish people as they try to survive in a genetic aristocracy.

=== Vertigo Comics ===
- The Books of Faerie: Serpent's Tooth – Originally planned as an ongoing series about the character Molly O'Reilly, it was changed to a five-issue miniseries scheduled to start in June 2000.

== Dreamwave Productions ==
When Dreamwave Productions declared bankruptcy in 2005, several of the Transformers series running at the time were left unconcluded. When IDW Publishing acquired the rights to the Transformers licence, they reprinted several past issues from Dreamwave in trade paperback form. In April 2007, then editor-in-chief Chris Ryall remarked that the unpublished Dreamwave stories were still tied up in legal issues and that it was likely to stay that way, leaving those stories unfinished. Staff over the years has released material from those issues on their personal accounts and/or websites.

- Transformers: Generation One (Dreamwave) #11–14: Previews indicated that Chris Sarracini and Guido Guidi were to take over from issue 12.
- Transformers: The War Within (Volume Three: The Age of Wrath) #4–6: Dreamwave's closure meant the series was halted at issue #3, but information and images from following issues were released.
- Transformers: Energon #31–36: Although it only had artwork and solicitations up until issue 33, in November 2010, Simon Furman revealed the plot of the unreleased issues on his blog, going as far as issue 36. Issues 31 and 32 would later receive reconstructions with assistance of Furman and Alex Milne by the fan-group TFNation.

== Eclipse Comics ==
- Legends Index – An index of the DC Comics miniseries Legends was planned in May 1987 under Eclipse's Independent Comics Group imprint.
- Miracleman #25–34 and Miracleman: Triumphant – Because of the bankruptcy of Eclipse Comics, the last published issue of Miracleman was #24. Issues #25–28, which would have completed the storyline The Silver Age, were not printed. The follow-up storyline, The Dark Age (projected for Miracleman #29–34), and a spin-off series, Miracleman: Triumphant, were also never published. Pages from issue #25 and Miracleman: Triumphant #1 have been reprinted in Kimota! The Miracleman Companion by TwoMorrows Publishing. Marvel later reprinted Miracleman and announced plans to publish Neil Gaiman's end to the storyline; the new issues finally began appearing in late 2022.
- Mr. Monster/Swamp Thing – See above (DC Comics).
- Peter Pan and Wendy – A three-issue miniseries based on the J. M. Barrie characters. Written by Andy Mangels with art by Craig Hamilton and Rick Bryant, it was planned for Spring 1989 before being pushed back to Spring 1990. According to Mangels, "the first issue (and part of the second) is finished, and I haven't given up hope that someday, it may see print".

== Eternity Comics ==
- The Uncensored Mouse #3 – A third issue of this series (which reprinted classic Mickey Mouse comic strips) was ready to go to press until a lawsuit filed by The Walt Disney Company put an end to it.

== Fantagraphics Books ==
- Dodgem Logic – An Alan Moore anthology magazine originally scheduled for release in late 1985; the first issue was to contain a story titled "Convention Tension", a spoof of comic book conventions, while the second issue was to have a profile of British illustrator Aubrey Beardsley. Moore would later release a magazine with this title in 2010 through Top Shelf Productions, although it contained different contents.
- Graphic Story Monthly #8–11 – Issues #8–10 were to feature a Billie Holiday biography by Carlos Sampayo and José Antonio Muñoz, while issue #9 was to feature "Dancing on the Clouds" by Julian Lawrence and issue #11 was to include a story about a South American political massacre by Francisco Solano López.
- Rog-2000 – A two-issue miniseries reprinting John Byrne's "Rog-2000" stories from the Charlton Comics series E-Man. Both issues were eventually scheduled for Spring 1988, then later postponed to November.
- The Shadow – In 1979 a graphic novel was to have been published written by Harlan Ellison and illustrated by Michael Kaluta. The project broke down over Ellison insisting on retaining copyright despite The Shadow being a licensed property.
- Sinner #6–12 – The European series Sinner by Carlos Sampayo and José Muñoz was reprinted in the United States by Fantagraphics and planned to run for twelve issues. Only five issues were released. In addition, the Sampayo/Muñoz graphic novel Nicaragua was also to be republished by Fantagraphics.

== First Comics ==
- Classics Illustrated: Julius Caesar – In 1990, artist George Pérez was scheduled to draw an adaptation of William Shakespeare's Julius Caesar. The series was cancelled before Pérez could start work on the story.

== Gold Key Comics ==
- Magnus, Robot Fighter - The original series, titled Magnus, Robot Fighter, 4000 AD, ended on a cliffhanger in issue 28. However, there was an additional story written and penciled for what would have been issue #29 that was never completed, written by Mike Royer, and penciled by Paul Norris. The pages, along with the script for the story, were put up for auction in 2018. In the early '80s, a new Magnus backup series ran in the new Doctor Solar title in issues #29–31. This was supposed to lead to a new Magnus title, but Gold Key stopped publication soon afterwards. Supposedly, there was work completed for two new Magnus issues (what would have been Magnus #47, 48), but these have never been published.

== IDW Publishing ==
- Sonic the Hedgehog: Chasing Shadows - One-shot comic book featuring Shadow the Hedgehog. After multiple postponements of the release date, its author, Kiel Phegley, announced that it had been cancelled.
- Tom Clancy's Ghost Recon Breakpoint: Blind Prophets - A five-part comic book miniseries meant to bridge the gap between Ghost Recon: Wildlands and Breakpoint, the first three issues were solicited to release in 2020 before it was cancelled without explanation and all materials being removed from the official sites.

== Image Comics ==
- 1963 Annual #1 – A follow-up to the Image Comics series 1963, by Alan Moore and Jim Lee. Various issues with Moore, Lee, and Image itself led to the Annual being unfinished.
- Bionix – The title was intended to be an updated combined adaptation of the 1970s TV series The Six Million Dollar Man and The Bionic Woman (both of which were previously adapted in comic book form by Charlton Comics). The comic was proposed for Image's Maximum Press imprint and in 1996 a four-page preview of Bionix appeared in issue #6 of the Maximum title, Asylum. The series never went beyond the preview and solicitations in comics trade publications.
- Brigade #23–24 – Issue #25 was published out of order, between #9 and 10. There are no issues #23 and 24.
- Crimson Plague – A science fiction story by writer-artist George Pérez about an alien with ultra-toxic blood, the first issue was published in June 1997 by the now defunct Event Comics. In June 2000, the original first issue was re-published by Gorilla Comics with additional material and pages, with a follow up issue published in September. Due to the extreme high costs of being a self-publisher, which ended up being a financial burden (and putting himself in major debt), Pérez ended Crimson Plague a second time and never returned to the property before his death. George Pérez Storyteller includes artwork from the unpublished third issue of Crimson Plague.
- Section Zero – Published in 2000 by Gorilla Comics, an imprint of Image Comics, it was written by Karl Kesel with artwork by Tom Grummett. Gorilla Comics was intended to be a creator owned company financed by a comics related website, eHero.com. Along with the other Gorilla Comics creators, Kesel and Grummett attempted to continue the series they started, but these efforts proved unsuccessful. The three issues of Section Zero that were published were dated June, July and September 2000. A fourth issue was solicited, but was never published. In January 2012, Kesel said that he and Grummett would be relaunching Section Zero as a webcomic on the Mad Genius Comics website. The previously published stories are being posted on the site and new material will be added as it is completed.
- The Walking Dead #194-195 – Image Comics issued cryptic solicitations with mocked-up cover art for issues #194 and #195 of The Walking Dead to preserve the surprise of the series' unexpected conclusion in issue #193. The two fake issues were cancelled after #193 was released.

== Kitchen Sink Press ==
- Border Worlds – Don Simpson's science fiction series Border Worlds was to be revived with issue #8, and was hoped to be completed in 12 or 13 issues. Instead, the series was continued with Border Worlds: Marooned, of which only one issue was released.
- Megaton Man #11–12 – Creator Don Simpson declared that Megaton Man would only run for twelve issues. He chose to end the series with issue #10 so he could begin work on Border Worlds, but he returned to the character for the miniseries The Return of Megaton Man and a number of spin-off one-shots.
- Ms. Megaton Man #1 – One of a series of one-shots by Don Simpson, this book was to be released in April 1990 but never came out. Other planned one-shots included Destroy Megaton Man #1, How to Draw Megaton Man with Tad and Rover #1, and Son of Megaton Man #1.

== Mad Love ==
- Big Numbers #3–12 – This Alan Moore/Bill Sienkiewicz limited series only saw two issues published before it ended. Pages of issue #3 have surfaced on the Internet.

== Malibu Comics ==
- Exiles #5–6 by Steve Gerber and Paul Pelletier – In order to preserve the shock ending of Exiles #4 (in which the story abruptly ends when the entire team is killed due to their leader's poor judgment), Malibu falsely solicited and took advance orders for Exiles #5 and 6 (which were described as featuring a villain named "the Hoaxter" and a setting called "the Carnival of Lies"). Retailers who had been misled into ordering these issues were subsequently reimbursed.
- Firearm Annual #1 – James Robinson wrote the script to this book, but chose not to release it due to what he described as a "bad feeling about Malibu" at the time.

== Marvel Comics ==
- The Activators – A toy tie-in comic that was briefly announced by Marvel, in addition to an animated home video release and subsequent television series which were both set to come out in 1986.
- All Winners Squad: Band Of Heroes #6–8 - Originally solicted as an eight-issue limited series by Paul Jenkins and Carmine Di Giandomenico, it was cancelled at issue 5 due to poor sales, despite issues #6 and #7 having already been solicited. Jenkins had written the scripts for the last three issues, while Giandomenico pencilled the artwork for issues six, seven and part of eight.
- The Amazing Spider-Man (vol. 2) and Black Cat by Kevin Smith – Smith was announced as the writer of an ongoing Black Cat series and The Amazing Spider-Man in early to mid-2002. Because of the delays on 2002's Spider-Man/Black Cat: The Evil that Men Do and Daredevil/Bullseye: The Target, the plan was switched so that Smith would start a third Spider-Man title, launched in 2004 by Mark Millar instead.
- Ant-Man - An unreleased 5-issue limited series by Daniel Way with Clayton Crain intended for publication under the Marvel MAX imprint, announced for 2003 Four issues were solicited before the series was pulled off schedule. A collected edition was solicited for a 2004 release but also subsequently cancelled.
- Black Cat (Vol. 1) #13 - While solicited, this issue's cancelation would instead lead to a tease of a new series for the King in Black crossover event. The cover originally solicited for this issue would later be used as a variant cover for Black Cat (Vol. 2) #1, and the story repurposed for Black Cat (Vol. 2) #4.
- Captain America (vol. 2) by Chuck Dixon – Dixon was enlisted by Rob Liefeld to write Captain America during the "Heroes Reborn" storyline, but left the title when Liefeld chose not to use the plot he had written. Dixon's plot, which involved white and black supremacists, was later used for a Green Lantern/Green Arrow crossover.
- The Cat #5 – A fifth issue of the series was drawn by Ramona Fradon, but the title was canceled due to lack of sales on previous issues. Almost all pages were later made available online by Tom Brevoort.
- Colossus miniseries – Mentioned in Amazing Heroes Preview Special #2, Chris Claremont and Rick Leonardi were to work on this six-issue miniseries about Colossus' return to Russia for release in Summer 1986. Also mentioned were other planned miniseries written by Claremont featuring Storm, the Starjammers, and the Hellfire Club.
- The Completely Mental Misadventures of Ed Grimley – A tie-in to the Hanna-Barbera animated series was considered for release by Marvel in 1989.
- Daredevil by Frank Miller and Walt Simonson – After completing the "Born Again" arc, Frank Miller intended to produce a two-part story with artist Walt Simonson, but the collaboration was never completed and remains unpublished.
- Daredevil by Steve Englehart – Englehart was set to take over writing Daredevil following Frank Miller and David Mazzucchelli's run on the title, but he was replaced by Ann Nocenti. Issue #237 was the only issue scripted by Englehart.
- Daredevil/Bullseye: The Target – The Kevin Smith-penned miniseries debuted in 2002, but only one issue was published.
- Deathlok: Detour - An unreleased 5-issue limited series by Daniel Way with Darick Robertson intended for publication under the Marvel MAX imprint, announced for 2004, two issues were solicited before the series was pulled off schedule. When reached for comment on the book's status in late 2011, Marvel responded that they're still "waiting for the right time to launch the title."
- Destroyers by Fred Van Lente and Kyle Hotz – A cancelled five-issue mini-series in which the Destroyer recruits She-Hulk, The Thing, Beast, A-Bomb, and Karkas to fight monsters around the world. Devil Dinosaur would also have appeared in the mini-series.
- Doctor Strange (vol. 2) drawn by Frank Miller – A house advertisement for Doctor Strange appeared in Marvel Comics cover-dated February 1981. It stated: "Watch for the new adventures of Earth's Sorcerer Supreme—as mystically conjured by Roger Stern and Frank Miller!". Miller's only contribution to the series would be the cover for Doctor Strange #46 (April 1981). Other commitments prevented Miller from working on the series.
- Doctor Strange, Sorcerer Supreme by David Quinn – In 1993, Marvel approached Quinn to write Doctor Strange, Sorcerer Supreme, but his run on the title was cut short after issue #79 despite having numerous ideas planned for the book; among them were a story involving Marvel's version of Dracula, as well as having Strange run a school for children with supernatural powers.
- Empyre tie-ins - A number of titles were removed from the Empyre crossover event checklist due to the COVID-19 pandemic: These include Empyre: Ghost Rider, Empyre: The Invasion of Wakanda, Empyre: Spider-Man, Empyre: Squadron Supreme, Empyre: Stormranger, Empyre: Thor, Strikeforce #10, and The Union #1–3 (of 5), which was later resolicited as a tie-in to the King in Black crossover event.
- Excalibur graphic novel – Planned for December 1990 was a hardcover graphic novel by Chris Claremont, Alan Davis, and Paul Neary which would have revealed the origin of Nightcrawler and his connection to the villain Mystique.
- Fallen Angels II – A six-issue follow-up miniseries by writer Jo Duffy and artist Colleen Doran was to be released in 1988, possibly in "late spring", with further miniseries planned.
- Fantastic Four: Fathers and Sons – This graphic novel was mentioned in Marvel Age Annual #4 in 1988 but never published. It was to have been written by Danny Fingeroth and drawn by Mark Bright. Bright left the project after completing only a few pages of artwork and was replaced by Al Milgrom.
- Felix the Cat – Marvel was to produce a one-shot adaptation of New World Pictures' Felix the Cat: The Movie by writer Laura Hitchcock and penciller Howard Post.
- Freddy Krueger's A Nightmare on Elm Street #3 – A third issue of this black-and-white magazine was planned with a self-contained story written by Buzz Dixon and drawn by Bob Hall. Backup stories and pin-ups would also have appeared in the magazine beginning with that issue.
- The Further Adventures of Indiana Jones #35 – A proposed plot for issues #32–35 was laid out by editor Ralph Macchio in Amazing Heroes Preview Special #1. The series ended with issue #34.
- Ghost Rider graphic novel – A then-tentative graphic novel by Tom DeFalco and Dick Ayers featuring an update of the western hero Ghost Rider.
- Ghost Rider 2099: Daddy Dearest - This issue was paid for by Marvel but was never released after the cancelation of the entire 2099 line of comic books. The issue was released in full on both Scott K. Andrews's and Salgood Sam's websites.
- Giant-Size Super-Heroes #2 – This comic book was announced in the next-issue box at the end of Giant-Size Super-Heroes #1 (June 1974, which featured Spider-Man), but was never published. The title was mentioned as "The Night They Tore Old New York Down!".
- Greenberg the Vampire II – A prequel/sequel to the previous Greenberg the Vampire graphic novel by creator J.M. DeMatteis, this book by DeMatteis and Mark Badger was to appear in late summer of 1988. It involved the story of Greenberg's transformation into a vampire and how he met his future wife, Denise.
- Invisible Woman miniseries – Expected for Spring 1986, a four-issue miniseries by John Byrne and Mary Wilshire involved Sue Richards becoming trapped in another dimension.
- Iron Man: Viva Las Vegas - A four-issue limited series published under Marvel's Marvel Knights imprint, Jon Favreau wrote two issues of the planned mini-series that debuted in September 2008 before being canceled in November 2008.
- JLA/Avengers – See above (DC Comics).
- Longshot (vol. 2) – Ann Nocenti and Arthur Adams were to reunite for a Longshot graphic novel, but this was changed to an ongoing series set to appear some time during the first half of 1989. Neither project materialized.
- Luke Cage: City of Fire - A miniseries by Ho Che Anderson and Farid Karami, it was cancelled one month before release. According to Anderson, the scripts were written, and the first issue was completed, while the second and third one were underway.
- Marvel Masterworks Defenders and Marvel Team-Up - First listed for January 2026 by Penguin Random House, they were pulled from catalogue and Marvel soon announced that the series would be going on indefinite hiatus after volume 389 as a result of declining sales, effectively cancelling the next volumes, which was to be The Defenders vol. 10 and Marvel Team-Up Vol. 9. J.M. DeMatteis later confirmed the books' cancellation and shared the introduction he wrote for them on his blog.
- Marvel Tales: Apocalypse – A Grant Morrison and Mark Millar miniseries that was meant to revive the Marvel 2099 imprint as well as launch three new titles for the line - Captain America 2099, Iron Man 2099, and Avengers 2099. Marvel's financial difficulties in the mid-1990s would contribute to its failure.
- Marvel Tales: End of the World – A Grant Morrison and Mark Millar miniseries that was originally pitched in 1994, but was rejected by Marvel twice in favor of their Skrull Kill Krew series.
- The Marvel World of Tomorrow – Stan Lee and John Byrne's line of Marvel comics set in the future, the project eventually evolved into Marvel 2099. Tomorrow Chronicles, a Lee/Byrne graphic novel that was due in October 1991, was part of the concept. Byrne's ideas for the line were later used in his Dark Horse Comics titles 2112 and Danger Unlimited.
- Marvels II and Marvels III – Kurt Busiek's sequel to Marvels (titled Marvels: Cops & Robbers) would have focused on the characters of officer Charles Williams and his brother Royal; the second sequel would have focused on Marcia Hardesty, who was introduced in the original series as Phil Sheldon's assistant. Busiek left the project while working on Cops & Robbers, due to creative differences with the artist; it would eventually become the series Code of Honor written by Chuck Dixon.
- New Warriors (2020) - Marvel Comics announced that on March 17, 2020, a new version of the team would appear, this time with new characters forming the New Warriors: Screentime, Snowflake, Safespace, B-Negative, and Trailblazer. The direction of the new characters – particularly the use of pejorative internet slang in names as well as the perceived political agenda of the writing – was met with considerable backlash from online audiences. No New Warriors comics were released and the title was removed from ComiXology, with both Marvel and its creators refusing to comment on the future or cancellation of the comic. Despite the series' cancellation, B-Negative made a cameo appearance in the series Blade: Darkhold.
- Nightcrawler miniseries by Chris Claremont – Both Claremont and Dave Cockrum had plans to release Nightcrawler miniseries, according to Amazing Heroes #39. The Claremont one was to be set in Ruritania from The Prisoner of Zenda and involve the villains Mystique and Arcade, and was estimated to appear in 1985. Cockrum's miniseries was the only one released that year. Elements from the Claremont series would be used in his story "What Happened to Nightcrawler?" from Uncanny X-Men #204.
- The Official Handbook of the Marvel Universe Deluxe Edition #21–22 – Following the "Book of the Dead" issues which covered deceased characters, issue #21 was to begin a two-issue illustrated appendix called "The Book of Names" which included every super-powered character and major supporting cast member who did not receive an entry in the previous issues. The appendix was later planned to be included in the first Update series, originally scheduled for 1988.
- The Official Marvel Index – At least nine issues were planned for both the Avengers Index and X-Men Index in the late 1980s. In addition, an index for Peter Parker, the Spectacular Spider-Man would have been released between the indices for Marvel Team-Up and Avengers.
- Open Space #5 – Open Space was a science-fiction anthology series. Alex Ross' first work for Marvel was to have been printed in issue #5, but the title was cancelled with issue #4 (August 1990). Ross' story was printed in 1999 as a special supplement to Wizard's Alex Ross Special. Other stories planned for issue #5 were "Demonworld" by Maggie Thompson, Vince Mielcarek, and Marie Severin; "Weak Link" by Peter David and Bill Koeb; and "Random Error" by Judith and Garfield Reeves-Stevens, Louis LaChance, and Richard Howell.
- Ozma of Oz – In 1975, MGM's Marvelous Wizard of Oz was the first joint publishing venture between DC Comics and Marvel Comics. Marvel then published an adaptation of The Marvelous Land of Oz. A full page house advertisement in the second treasury promised an Ozma of Oz adaptation, but was never published.
- Phoenix miniseries – A six-issue miniseries by Chris Claremont and Rick Leonardi was going to explain the origins of Rachel Summers, but plans for the book were cancelled before the first issue was completed.
- Star Wars: Shadow of Vader – Marvel announced in October 2018 that a five-issue, Chuck Wendig penned miniseries, Star Wars: Shadow of Vader, would be released starting in January 2019. The series would be an anthology told from the perspectives of those who had encountered Darth Vader. After three issues had been written, Wendig was removed from the miniseries and future projects by Marvel over concerns of his use of social media, and ultimately the miniseries was cancelled.
- The Prisoner – In the "Bullpen Bulletins" page in Marvel Comics cover-dated July 1976, Marvel announced a comic book based on The Prisoner, to be written by Steve Englehart and drawn by a then-unchosen artist and scheduled to be "starting this summer". The artist assigned to the project would be Gil Kane. When Jack Kirby returned to Marvel, the property was transferred to him. A test issue was put together but never completed. All 17 pages were scripted and pencilled by Kirby, but only parts were lettered and inked, by Mike Royer. Original artwork from this comic still exists and some of it has been published in the comic book fanzine The Jack Kirby Collector.
- Punisher/Fury: Rules of the Game – A hardcover graphic novel by Gregory Wright and Jim Lee was promoted in Punisher Annual #4 as coming out in late 1991, and would have featuring the Punisher teaming up with Nick Fury. Due to Lee's commitment to other projects and later forming Image Comics, the book was left unfinished.
- Punisher Vs Barracuda - A miniseries, meant to serve as Barracuda's introduction in the main Marvel universe, was planned to come out before being cancelled in 2020, with Ed Brisson and Declan Shalvey explaining in a podcast that Marvel cancelled it due to COVID and unfortunate timing with "real life events". According to them, all issues were written and a majority of artwork was completed.
- Questprobe #4–12 – Originally intended as a 12-issue miniseries, this video game tie-in was canceled after issue #3 (November 1985) due to Adventure International's bankruptcy. The story intended for issue #4, featuring the X-Men, was published in Marvel Fanfare #33 (July 1987).
- Silver Surfer miniseries – A 12-issue miniseries written by Steve Englehart and drawn by John Buscema was listed in Amazing Heroes Preview Special #1, but only the first issue was pencilled. That story would later be published in Marvel Fanfare #51 in 1990.
- The Spectacular Spider-Man magazine #3 – The Spectacular Spider-Man was a two-issue magazine published by Marvel in 1968, as an experiment in entering the black-and-white comic book-magazine market. The next-issue box at the end of issue #2 promoted the planned contents of the unrealized issue #3 as "The Mystery of the TV Terror".
- Strange Tales (vol. 4) #3–4 – The stories, writer J.M. DeMatteis' Man-Thing and writer Paul Jenkins' Werewolf by Night, were bought and solicited, but never illustrated nor published. DeMatteis wrapped up his Man-Thing run in Peter Parker: Spider-Man Annual '99 and included a two-page synopsis of the never-published third and fourth issues.
- The Thing miniseries by Barry Windsor-Smith – The Thing ongoing series was cancelled with issue #36 (June 1986). The letters column of the last issue mentioned an upcoming miniseries by Barry Windsor-Smith. He had previously written and drawn a Thing story in Marvel Fanfare #15 (July 1984). The miniseries was never published. In January 2006, Windsor-Smith revealed on the website Comic Book Galaxy that he was in negotiations with Marvel to publish his Thing story as a graphic novel. As of 2020, it remains unpublished.
- True Friends – A 1984 graphic novel starring Kitty Pryde of the X-Men and Illyana Rasputin of the New Mutants, written by Chris Claremont. Claremont later wrote a three-issue miniseries titled X-Men: True Friends in 1999, although this series starred Pryde and Rachel Summers.
- Victor Von Doom by Nick Spencer and Becky Cloonan - Having had solicitations as far as January 2012 for the third issue, this series focusing on a young Doctor Doom was cancelled, according to Tom Brevoort, due to issues regarding deadlines.
- Warlock #16 – Warlock was cancelled with issue #15 (November 1976). A 16th issue had been partially drawn by Alan Weiss, but the artwork was lost in a New York City taxicab.
- What If – Following the end of Marvel's first What If series, there were plans to release a number of new stories in 1985. One of them, by Peter B. Gillis and Jerry Ordway, was tentatively titled "What If the X-Men Were the Avengers?" and involved Professor X never forming the X-Men. Another story by Gillis speculated what would happen if Matt Murdock had been crippled in addition to being blinded. A story by Stan Lee, Tom DeFalco, and Jackson Guice involved Doctor Doom keeping the stolen powers of the Silver Surfer. Eventually one of the stories, "What If Iron Man Had Been a Traitor" by Gillis and Steve Ditko, would be released in What If Special #1 in 1988. Considered for the second What If series was the story "What If the Avengers Had Lost the Acts of Vengeance".
- X-Men: Dancing with Doctor D – An X-Men graphic novel written by Chris Claremont which was expected to be released in 1985. It involved the X-Men facing a mutant with the power to control sleep and take over people's dreams.

=== Epic Comics ===
- The Derangers – A series by writer Bill Mantlo and artist Ken Steacy about a group of would-be heroes with unexplained powers. Mantlo later introduced the characters during his run on the Marvel title Alpha Flight.
- Doctor Zero #9 – A ninth issue of this Epic Comics series was planned, with a cover by George Pratt.
- Epic Illustrated: "The Last Galactus Story" conclusion – Writer-penciler John Byrne and inker Terry Austin produced "The Last Galactus Story" as a serial in the anthology comics-magazine Epic Illustrated #26–34 (October 1984 – February 1986). Nine of a scheduled 10 installments appeared. Each ran six pages, except part eight, which ran 12. The magazine was canceled with issue #34, leaving the last chapter unpublished and the story unfinished. Byrne later revealed on his website that the conclusion would have seen a dying Galactus releasing his power, causing a new Big Bang and transforming his herald Nova into the Galactus of the next universe.
- Hellrider – A 48-page one-shot with Joe Jusko as plotter/illustrator and Archie Goodwin as scripter scheduled for Spring 1988. Originally titled "The Last Ride of T.J. Hackett", this post-holocaust story was supposed to appear in Epic Illustrated before its cancellation.
- Void Indigo #3–6 – The comic by Steve Gerber and Val Mayerik was cancelled due to reactions to its portrayal of extreme violence.

=== Marvel UK ===
- In 1993–1994, a number of projects and comics were cancelled by Marvel UK in the middle of the comic book crash.
  - Battletide III – A sequel to both Battletides miniseries.
  - Dark Guard: Old Friends – Possibly contained the contents of the unpublished Dark Guard #5–6.
  - Death3: Prometheus Rising
  - G-Force – A 4-issue miniseries.
  - Heavy Weapon 911 – A Frontier title.
  - Kill Frenzy – A 4-issue miniseries.
  - Knuckledown – A 4-issue miniseries.
  - Loose Cannons – A 4-issue miniseries and a Warheads spin-off about the all-female Virago Troop painted by Mark Harrison. It was released online in 2005 by its own creator.
  - Red Mist 20-20 – A crossover between Marvel UK titles that was cancelled in its entirety to the last minute. It includes:
    - Bloodrush – A 4-issue miniseries.
    - Death Duty – A 4-issue miniseries.
    - Roid Rage – A 4-issue miniseries and a Super Soldiers spin-off about Agent Keller.
    - Super Soldiers #9–10
    - Wild Thing #8–10 – The title was cancelled by issue #7.
  - Sisters of Grace – A Frontier title.

=== Star Comics ===
- Defenders of the Earth #5 – The final issue of this cartoon adaptation was supposed to be #5. The title was cancelled after issue #4, which ended on a cliffhanger involving Mandrake the Magician and his nemesis Dr. Dark.
- Planet Terry/Wally the Wizard - According to editor Dennis O'Neil, plans were afoot to combine the two Star Comics titles into a single comic. Both series were cancelled after their 12th issues.
- Young Astronauts – A tie-in to the Saturday morning cartoon The Young Astronauts. Following the Space Shuttle Challenger disaster in 1986, both the cartoon and the comic were shelved.
- Zoids – Originally published by Marvel UK, an American series written by Grant Morrison was planned for the kid-oriented Star Comics line, but the project was cancelled due to being considered too adult as well as due to declining interest. In addition, Marvel UK's Spider-Man and Zoids title was cancelled with issue #51, interrupting Morrison's "Black Zoid" storyline before it was finished.

== Megaton Comics ==
- Ethrian – A spin-off of the "Ethrian" stories appearing in Megaton, this series by writer Gary Carlson and artists Frank Fosco and Mike Matthew was to premiere in August 1987.
- Megaton (vol. 2) – At least three issues of this color follow-up to the original Megaton series by Gary Carlson were planned, including an appearance by Youngblood in issue #3.
- Megaton Comics Presents...Doctor Weird – A reprint of an early 1970s Jim Starlin series that was due in April 1988. Big Bang Comics would later reprint the stories in Doctor Weird Special #1 in 1994.
- Megaton Special – A quarterly anthology series, with the first issue set to feature the premiere of Youngblood while the second issue was to be called the Megaton Christmas Special. Megaton Comics folded before the first issue was released. However, a book titled Megaton Holiday Special was released by Entity Comics in November 1993.
- Outpost: Earth – A spin-off from Megaton set to premiere in late spring of 1987, this title was to continue the adventures of the character Vanguard. Written by Gary Carlson and illustrated by Steve Adams, the title was later set to be released by Prime Comics and distributed by Comics Interview Publications.
- Ramm #3–4 – Synopses of the first four issues were included in Amazing Heroes Preview Special #5. Only the first two issues of the series were released.
- Youngblood – Rob Liefeld's Youngblood was planned for a four-issue miniseries from Megaton Comics, to be released in late 1986 or early 1987. The series never appeared before Megaton Comics went out of business, but would resurface as the first title released by Image Comics in 1992.

== New Comics Group ==
- All-Kids Comics – An anthology of stories about children which was intended to "recapture the innocence and joy of childhood" according to editor Valarie Jones.
- Bionic Six – A tie-in to the animated TV series written by Steve Perry and pencilled by Greg Espinoza and Michio Okamura.
- Tommy and the Monsters #2–4 – Planned as a four-issue miniseries, Tommy and the Monsters was a combination of humor and science fiction written by Will Jacobs and Gerard Jones. Only the first issue of this title was released.

== Nicotat Comics ==
- The Deadliest Creature on Earth...Man #2–3 – Put out on an irregular release schedule, a second issue of this series by writer James Dean Smith and artist Mark Jones was likely to be released in September 1989, with plans for at least one more issue after that.
- My Pal, Mightyman – Based on a series of prose stories written by Will Jacobs and Gerard Jones, My Pal, Mightyman was a four-issue miniseries written by Jacobs and Jones with art by James Dean Smith scheduled for Spring 1989. Jacobs and Jones later published the adventures of the character as My Pal Splendid Man on their blog.
- Steve Ditko's Static – A three-issue miniseries with story and art by Ditko. Nicotat failed to publish the title, but a limited-edition book containing material from the series was later released.

== Quality Communications ==
- Warrior #27–29 – According to Amazing Heroes Preview Special #1, the third book of Alan Moore and David Lloyd's V for Vendetta was scheduled to begin in issue #29. The series ended with issue #26. Issues #27 and #28 were also to contain chapters of V, which would later be completed by Moore and Lloyd at DC Comics.
- Warrior (vol. 2) – A full-color follow-up to Quality's previous Warrior magazine was to launch in October 1986. The strips included were to be John Smith/Patrick Doyle/Will Simpson's "The Projectors", Grant Morrison/John Ridgway's "The Liberators", and Mark Alexander/Dave Elliott's "Bulldog Britain".
- Warrior: "Nightjar" – An Alan Moore/Bryan Talbot serial that was planned to run in the British magazine Warrior. The first part was eventually published in 2003 in Alan Moore's Yuggoth Cultures and Other Growths, with spin-offs produced by other creators.

== Revolutionary Comics ==
- Tipper Gore's Comics and Stories #6 – Issue #6 of this anthology series was to include stories by Jay Sanford/Tom Luth ("Ticket to Ride"), Herb Shapiro/Scott Jackson ("The Man Who Loved Lovecraft"), Norm Breyfogle ("Dance with Death"), and Adam Burchess/Johnny Childish ("Daddy Scares Me").

== Solson Publications ==
- Reagan's Raiders #4 – A fourth issue of Monroe Arnold's spoof of President Ronald Reagan, described as being "a 'star wars' issue", was planned.

== Spotlight Comics ==
- Mighty Mouse #3–6 and Mighty Mouse Adventure Magazine #2–3 – Spotlight Comics' Mighty Mouse title was planned for at least six issues, with stories by Doug Cushman ("The Vapor Villains of Venus"), John A. Wilcox/Mark Marcus/Dennis Yee ("Just a Matter of Time"), and Jim Main (a parody of The Land That Time Forgot) lined up for issues #4–6, respectively. The contents of the second issue of Mighty Mouse Adventure Magazine were already laid out, which included three Mighty Mouse stories and backups featuring Heckle and Jeckle and Deputy Dawg, while a subsequent issue was to feature a Mighty Mouse/Calamity Charlie story.

== Ten-Buck Comics ==
- Crossbow Chronicles – An ongoing series by Chris Alexander featuring characters from the comic Space Beaver which was originally scheduled for early 1990 but was pushed back to late in the year.
- Space Beaver #12 – Following the premature end of this series due to low sales, an agreement was reached between creator Darick Robertson and the publisher which would allow the book to continue, with different creators using Robertson's plot outlines to finish the story. As such, a 12th issue was planned for the end of 1990 with hopes to continue the title beyond that.
- Stinger: The Origin Issue – This one-shot spin-off of Space Beaver by Tibor Sardy and Chris Alexander was delayed for over a year and was hoped to be released before the end of 1989. The story was later scheduled for issues #3–4 of the anthology series Crossbow Chronicles.

== Topps Comics ==
- Victory #2–5 – Topps Comics attempted to revive the Captain Victory character as part of a planned five-issue miniseries, which only lasted one issue before Topps cancelled all of the "Kirbyverse" books in 1994. The only issue is dated June 1994 and was a part of a more complex project named the "Secret City Saga".

== Warp Graphics ==
- City at World's End – A four-issue miniseries based on the novel of the same name by Edmond Hamilton. Tentatively scheduled for Christmas 1986, the series was to be written and pencilled by John Byrne.

== WildStorm ==
- Stormwatch: Team Achilles #24 – The series' cancellation was announced for #24, but the series ended at issue #23 due to controversy surrounding writer Micah Wright. The script for #24 is available on Wright's site.

== Published comics ==
This is a list of comics that were unpublished as originally intended, but would eventually be published in a different form or after a long delay.

=== DC Comics ===
- Batman: Europa – Written by Brian Azzarello, this project was scheduled to be released in 2011 but shelved because of The New 52. It was eventually released between 2015 and 2016.
- Batman: Gotham Knights #12 by Devin K. Grayson – The Victor Zsasz story written by Devin Grayson that was originally scheduled for this issue was considered too graphic and was replaced with a fill-in story. The Zsasz story finally saw print in the Batman: Arkham: Victor Zsasz trade paperback in 2020.
- Elseworlds 80-Page Giant #1 – This book was already printed and ready to be released, but controversy over the story "Letitia Lerner, Superman's Babysitter" led to almost the entire run being destroyed. Although DC pulped all copies of the issue intended for the North American market, some were still distributed in Europe. The controversial story was later reprinted in the Bizarro Comics hardcover (ISBN 1-56389-779-2, released in May 2001) and softcover (ISBN 1-56389-958-2, released in April 2003). The story "Superman Jr. is No More!" was republished in Superman / Batman: Saga of the Super Sons (November 2007). The entire issue was later reprinted in DC Comics Presents: Elseworlds 80-Page Giant #1 in 2011.
- The House of Secrets: "Night of the Rat" – An unpublished Patchwork Man story by Gerry Conway and Nestor Redondo which was eventually printed in The House of Secrets: The Bronze Age Omnibus Volume 2.
- JLA: Kid Amazo – Originally supposed to be released as a hardcover in 2004, the book was cancelled, possibly because of low sales orders. The story was eventually printed in JLA: Classified #37–41 (June–October 2007).
- The Joker #10 – The letters page of The Joker #9 (September–October 1976) mentions that Martin Pasko was writing a Joker vs. the Justice League of America story titled "99 and 99/100 Percent Dead!" to appear in The Joker #10, which was never published. In the end notes of The Greatest Joker Stories Ever Told (1989) it is noted that The Joker editor Julius Schwartz had no recollection of this story ever being completed, but Pasko found photocopied pages of the story which he sold on eBay in 2011. A cover for issue #10 was drawn by Ernie Chan, but was never finished. The story was finally published in 2019 in The Joker: The Bronze Age Omnibus.
- Kobra #8 – A Kobra vs. Batman story intended for this issue was published in DC Special Series #1 (September 1977) instead.
- Leading Comics: "Land of Magic" – A Seven Soldiers of Victory story by scientist/author Joseph Samachson was put on the shelf when the Soldiers were dropped from Leading Comics following its change to a talking animal title in the 1940s. Joe Orlando, who was editing Adventure Comics in the 1970s, chose to feature Samachson's story as a backup feature following the team's return in Justice League of America #100–102 in 1972. The story ran in Adventure Comics #438–443.
- Meet Angel #8 – The Angel and the Ape series changed its title to Meet Angel with its seventh and final issue (November–December 1969). An eighth issue had been written and drawn and this story would be published in Limited Collectors' Edition #C-34 (February–March 1975) (Christmas with the Super-Heroes).
- The New Teen Titans: Games – DC originally announced this graphic novel by writer Marv Wolfman and artist George Pérez in 1988, but it never appeared. This project was revived years later and went so far as to be solicited for release in November 2010, but due to health problems and other commitments by Pérez it was postponed again. It has since been re-solicited and scheduled for release on September 7, 2011.
- The Redeemer – Joe Kubert's Christian allegorical tale of man endlessly resurrected. The miniseries was previewed in Amazing Heroes #34 in 1983. Although the first issue was completed, the series was pulled from DC Comics' schedule. The material was finally published in 2012 as one of the features in the Joe Kubert Presents miniseries.
- Sandman #7 – The story by writer Michael Fleisher and artist Jack Kirby was originally scheduled to be published in Sandman #7 in 1976 and then scheduled as part of Kamandi, the Last Boy on Earth #61 in 1978. Both series were cancelled before the story was published. It was eventually printed in Cancelled Comic Cavalcade #2 (Fall 1978) and in The Best of DC #22 (March 1982).
- Secret Society of Super Villains #1 alternate story – An alternate story for issue #1 of this series (with the chapter titles "Beware the Brotherhood of Crime" and "Enemy-- Thy Name Is Evil!") was printed in The Amazing World of DC Comics #11 and The Secret Society of Super Villains Volume One.
- Showcase Presents: Secret Society of Super Villains – The Secret Society of Super Villains series was scheduled to be collected into a trade paperback featuring issues #1–17 (520 pages, ISBN 1-4012-1587-4) but the project was cancelled. DC later reprinted the series in two hardcovers, which were released in 2011 and 2012.
- Superboy and the Legion of Super-Heroes Spectacular – Jim Starlin's 64-page story for Superboy and the Legion of Super-Heroes Spectacular (an entry in the DC Special Series title) was re-edited by Paul Levitz and published in Superboy and the Legion of Super-Heroes #250–251 following the "DC Implosion". The re-editing of the story (which also led to about twenty pages of artwork being unused) and the unavailability of Starlin's preferred inker Josef Rubinstein caused Starlin to remove his name from the story.
- Superman (vol. 2) Annual #3 by Walt Simonson – This annual was supposed to be released in 1990, featuring a post-Crisis version of the "Kryptonite Nevermore" storyline. Despite being advertised, the annual was not released that year. In 1991, an annual with this number was released as an Armageddon 2001 crossover. The Simonson story would later be published in Superman Special #1 in 1992.
- Superman: "Too Many Heroes" – An unpublished 12-page Superman story from 1945 believed to be written by Jerry Siegel. While a revised 10-page version by Bill Finger and Wayne Boring was released in Superman #55, the original iteration of the story was written off but salvaged by a young Marv Wolfman when he toured DC's headquarters as a child. It was finally published in the hardcover Action Comics #1000: 80 Years of Superman in 2018.
- Swamp Thing #25 - The existing scripts and artwork from this unpublished issue of the first Swamp Thing series were reprinted in the trade paperback Swamp Thing: The Bronze Age Volume 2. In 2026, it was announced that the unreleased 25th issue of the series would be completed for the first time for the Dark Genesis Omnibus with Josef Rubinstein inking the surviving pencils, alongside pencilling and inking a page from the original script, with José Villarubia on colors.
- Swamp Thing (vol. 2) by Rick Veitch – Veitch's original plans for the end of his run on Swamp Thing involved having the birth of the child of the Swamp Thing and Abby Holland in issue #92, and then remaining on the title for a year afterward to set up the child's powers. Following a contract dispute with DC, Veitch instead decided not to stay on the book past issue #92. Then, Veitch's story for issue #88 (where the Swamp Thing meets Jesus Christ during a time travel story arc) was cancelled by DC Comics due to their fear of controversy from religious groups; this caused Veitch to quit the title altogether before finishing the storyline, which another writer (Doug Wheeler) had to take over. In 2025, during New York Comic Con, it was announced that Veitch's final four issues of Swamp Thing would be published in 2026 under DC's Black Label imprint.
- The Teen Titans Swingin' Elseworlds Special – This book was postponed and ultimately never released; DC Comics finally released the story in January 2008 as Teen Titans: The Lost Annual.
- Wonder Girl (vol. 3) #8 – Issue #8 of this title (solicited for release in February 2022) was cancelled and the series ended with issue #7. Unreleased content would appear in Trials of the Amazons: Wonder Girl #1–2.

==== Milestone Comics ====
- Xombi Hanukkah Special - Although it was completed during the original run of the series, this comic written by John Rozum with art by Guy Davis went unreleased for unknown reasons. Rozum would later share a page of it on his personal blog. In 2026, it was announced to be included in the Milestone Compendium 5.

==== Vertigo Comics ====
- Hellblazer #141: "Shoot". – "Shoot" by Warren Ellis and Phil Jimenez was planned to deal with high school teenagers killing each other with firearms at school. After the Columbine High School massacre, DC editorial asked Ellis to make changes to the story before publication. In response, Ellis said: "I therefore requested that DC Vertigo either make those changes themselves and remove my name from the work, or, in the preferred scenario, not publish the work at all. Rather it go unseen than be released in a compromised form. To their credit, DC Vertigo have chosen to not release 'Shoot' at all". The story was eventually published in Vertigo Resurrected in 2010.

=== Marvel Comics ===
- Astonishing Captain America – Originally planned for release in 2011, it was part of a line of books similar to DC Comics' All-Star imprint. It was released in 2013 as Captain America: Living Legend.
- Captain America: White – A Jeph Loeb/Tim Sale collaboration from 2008. Only issue #0 was released that year; the rest of the series would not appear until 2015.
- Damage Control trade paperback – Set for March 1991 was a trade paperback collecting the first Damage Control miniseries. The series would not be collected until the release of the Damage Control: The Complete Collection paperback in 2015.
- Fantastic Four #102 by Stan Lee and Jack Kirby – The story by Lee and Kirby originally intended for Fantastic Four #102 (September 1970) was not published. Some of the artwork would appear in issue #108 (March 1971) but the rest of the story was not used. Marvel published an attempted reconstruction of this "lost" story in Fantastic Four: The Lost Adventure (April 2008).
- Incredible Hulk #320 by John Byrne – The original content of this issue was the Byrne story "A Terrible Thing to Waste", but Byrne was replaced on the title by Al Milgrom beginning with that issue. The Byrne story would later be published in Marvel Fanfare #29.
- Man-Thing: Screenplay of a Living Dead Man – A graphic novel written by Steve Gerber and illustrated by Kevin Nowlan was set to be released in October 1991. The story would finally be released in 2012's Infernal Man-Thing miniseries.
- Marvel Super Special #7 – An adaptation of the film Sgt. Pepper's Lonely Hearts Club Band by writer David Anthony Kraft and artists George Pérez and Jim Mooney was promoted on the "Bullpen Bulletins" page in Marvel Comics cover-dated January 1979. It was never published in the U.S. "because the book was late and the movie proved to be a commercial failure", according to a contemporaneous news account, which added, without substantiation, that, "reportedly, Marvel's adaptation was published in Japan". The material was published in France by Arédit in 1979.
- Ms. Marvel #24–25 – Ms. Marvel #24–25 were written and mostly drawn, but the series was cancelled with issue #23 (April 1979). They would have seen the introduction of the supervillainess and Mystique's lover Destiny, as well as Pyro, Avalanche, and future X-Man Rogue. Destiny, Avalanche, and Pyro would instead debut in Uncanny X-Men #141 and Rogue would debut in Avengers Annual #10. As Ms. Marvel and Mystique were assimilated into the X-Men book by Chris Claremont, references were made to the unpublished issues and Claremont's original plans for the series had it not been cancelled along with editorial footnotes implying that the unpublished issues and storyline would be published one day in the pages of Marvel Fanfare. They would instead be published in Marvel Super-Heroes (vol. 2) #10 (July 1992) and 11 (October 1992), with an additional 10 pages written and drawn by Simon Furman and Andrew Wildman to wrap up the storyline.
- Spider-Man/Black Cat: The Evil that Men Do #4–6 – Initially begun in 2002, the miniseries was put on hold after issue #3. Series writer Kevin Smith completed the scripts for the remaining issues in 2005 and the rest of the series was released soon after.
- The Twelve #9–12 – Originally intended as a 12-issue miniseries, the last issue (#8) came out October 8, 2008 because writer J. Michael Straczynski and artist Chris Weston were too busy with other projects to continue the series. Editor Tom Brevoort had stated that issues #9 and 10 were completed and Weston was waiting on scripts for the final two issues. As of April 2012, the remaining issues have been published.

==== Epic Comics ====
- The Black Dragon trade paperback – The Chris Claremont/John Bolton miniseries was to have a trade paperback release by Marvel in November 1988. A collected edition would not be released until Dark Horse published one in 1996.
- St. George #9–12 – St. George and the other two titles in the Shadowline universe (Doctor Zero and Powerline) were to cross over as part of a single storyline potentially running through issue #12 of this series. Instead, the three books were cancelled and the story was published in the Critical Mass miniseries.

== See also ==
- Intercompany crossover
- List of unpublished books
