= Superman: The Wedding Album =

1996 comic book by DC Comics

- Cover art by John Byrne.

Publication information
- Publisher: DC Comics
- Format: One-shot
- Genre: Superhero
- Publication date: October 6, 1996
- No. of issues: 1
- Main character(s): Superman/Clark Kent; Lois Lane

Creative team
- Written by: Dan Jurgens; Karl Kesel; David Michelinie; Louise Simonson; Roger Stern

Superman: The Wedding Album is an American comic book published in 1996 by DC Comics. It is notable for featuring the wedding of Superman/Clark Kent and Lois Lane in DC Comics continuity, an event that was nearly 60 years in the making.

Written by the five principal writers for the Superman titles at the time (Dan Jurgens, Karl Kesel, David Michelinie, Louise Simonson, and Roger Stern) and bearing a cover date of December 1996, the issue was published during the week of October 6, 1996, coinciding with an episode of the television series Lois & Clark: The New Adventures of Superman which also featured the wedding of the two characters.

Previous weddings involving the two characters had all been hoaxes, dreams, imaginary tales or in an alternate universe.

== Plot ==
The story follows after a yearlong breakup between Lois and Clark. Lois returns to Metropolis from her job as a foreign correspondent and agrees to marry Clark. The wedding is put together quickly, but no corners are cut. During this storyline, Clark is without his powers as Superman, having lost them during the previous Final Night crossover. There are brief cameos by many DC superheroes and a short passage with Batman, who offers an apartment owned by him to the couple and gets the superheroes of the DC Universe to look after Metropolis while Clark goes on his honeymoon.

Jimmy Olsen serves as best man, with Lucy Lane serving as maid of honor. The wedding is a traditional Christian variety in a big church (the Metropolis Chapel of United Faiths) although Lois is estranged with her father Sam Lane at the time and refuses to be walked down the aisle by him. Despite this, Sam attends his daughter's wedding as a witness, refusing to miss this moment. The priest that presides over the wedding is drawn to look like Jerry Siegel, one of the creators of Superman. The pews are also filled up with the writers and artists that have contributed to the Superman comic books over the years, including Joe Shuster, Superman's other creator.

== Honeymoon ==
After The Wedding Album, The Adventures of Superman #541, Action Comics #728 and Superman: The Man of Steel #63 featured Lois and Clark's honeymoon in Hawaii. Clark is captured by Rajiv Naga and needs Lois's help to escape since he does not have any powers, having lost them during The Final Night crossover story arc.

== Artists ==
Nearly every living major artist who had ever worked on a Superman comic title contributed to this issue:

- Murphy Anderson
- Terry Austin
- Jon Bogdanove
- Brett Breeding
- John Byrne
- Nick Cardy
- Kieron Dwyer
- Ron Frenz
- Kerry Gammill
- Dick Giordano
- Tom Grummett
- Jackson Guice
- Doug Hazlewood
- Stuart Immonen
- Dennis Janke

- Dan Jurgens
- Gil Kane
- Barry Kitson
- Jose Marzan Jr.
- Ray McCarthy
- Bob McLeod
- Jim Mooney
- Jerry Ordway
- George Pérez
- Al Plastino
- Denis Rodier
- Joe Rubinstein
- Paul Ryan
- Curt Swan
- Art Thibert

== Collected editions ==
- Superman: The Wedding and Beyond – the wedding and honeymoon of Lois and Clark are collected in one volume, includes Superman #118, Adventures of Superman #541, Action Comic #728, Superman: The Man of Steel #63 and Superman: The Wedding Album, released in November 1997. ISBN 1-56389-392-4
- DC Comics Presents: Superman: Lois & Clark 100-Page Super Spectacular #1 – reprint of Superman: The Wedding Album, released in November 2015 (cover date: January 2016), with cover art by Ryan Sook.
- Superman & Lois Lane: The 25th Wedding Anniversary Deluxe Edition – collecting Superman: The Wedding Album, Superman #118, Adventures of Superman #541, Action Comics #728 and Superman: The Man of Steel #63 and new extras, released in September 2021. ISBN 978-1779510334

== Awards ==
The book was a top vote getter for the Comics Buyer's Guide Fan Award for Favorite Comic-Book Story for 1997.
