= Tom Grummett =

Canadian comics artist and penciller (born 1959)

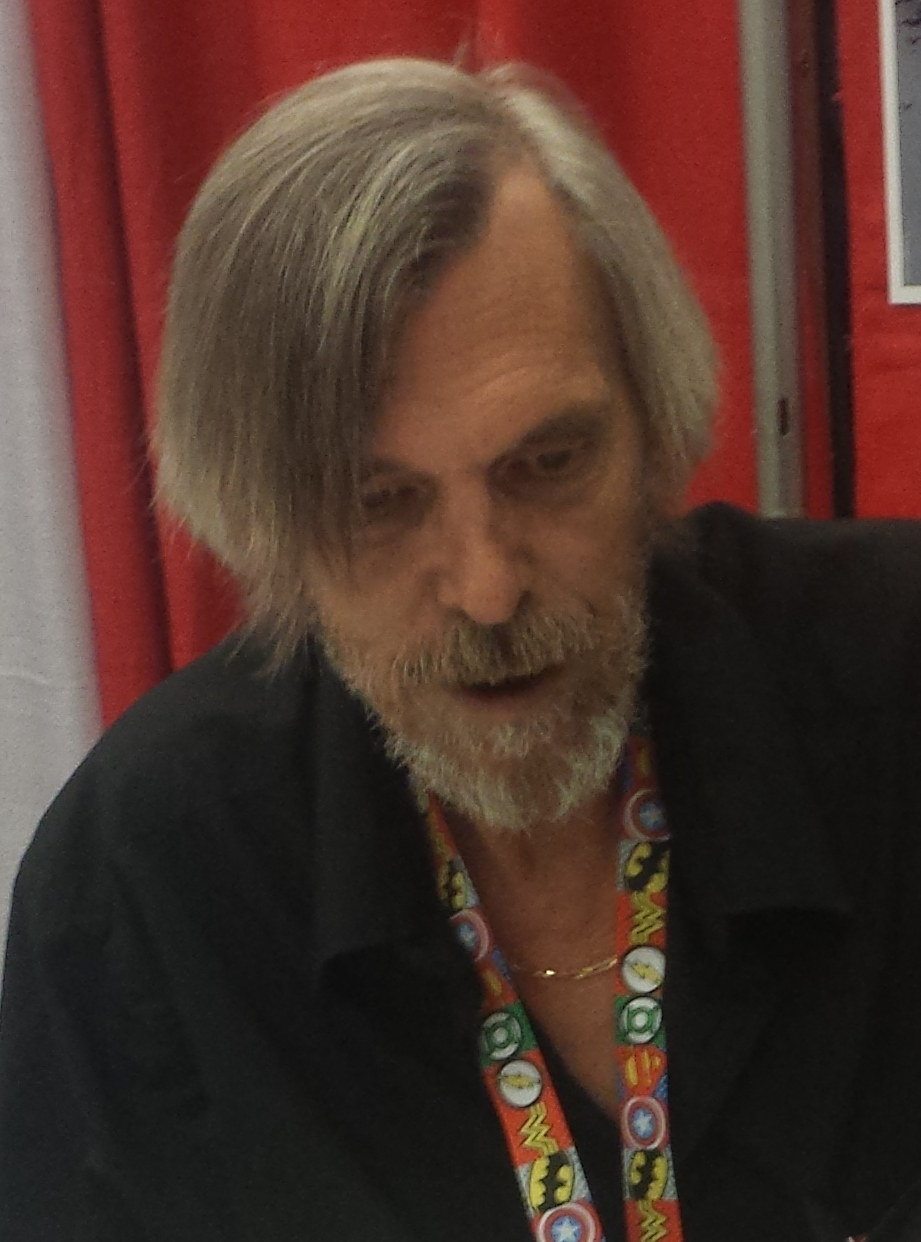
- Grummett in 2016
- Born: Thomas Grummett; 1959 (age 66–67) Saskatoon, Saskatchewan, Canada
- Area: Penciller
- Notable works: Adventures of Superman "The Death of Superman"; Superboy; Robin
- Awards: Inkpot Award 2015

Thomas Grummett (born 1959) is a Canadian comic book artist and penciller. He is best known for his work as penciller on titles such as The New Titans, The Adventures of Superman, Superboy, Power Company, Robin, New Thunderbolts, and Heroes.

== Career ==
=== DC Comics ===
Tom Grummett began providing finished artwork over George Pérez's layouts on The New Titans #58 (Sept. 1989). He worked with Pérez and Marv Wolfman on the "A Lonely Place of Dying" storyline, which introduced Tim Drake as Robin. Grummett remained on The New Titans after Pérez's departure and helped Wolfman revitalize the title. He began a long association with the Superman franchise when he drew Action Comics #665 (May 1991) and then helped writer Louise Simonson and artist Jon Bogdanove launch a new title, Superman: The Man of Steel in July 1991. Grummett drew part of The Adventures of Superman #480 (July 1991) and became the main artist on that series with the following issue and then worked on the "Panic in the Sky" crossover in 1992. During his run on The Adventures of Superman, Grummett and writer Jerry Ordway (along with editor Mike Carlin, Dan Jurgens, Roger Stern and others) were the architects of "The Death of Superman" storyline, in which Superman died and was resurrected. It was during that storyline, that Grummett and writer Karl Kesel, created the new Superboy (Kon-El / Conner Kent) in The Adventures of Superman #500 (June 1993). Grummett drew parts for DC Comics' other major event of the early 1990s, "Batman: Knightfall", contributing parts of "Knightquest" and "KnightsEnd". Grummett launched an ongoing Robin series in November 1993 with writer Chuck Dixon and a Superboy series three months later with Kesel. In Summer 1995, writer Roger Stern and Grummett created a new quarterly series, Superman: The Man of Tomorrow. He was one of the many artists who contributed to the Superman: The Wedding Album one-shot in 1996 wherein the title character married Lois Lane. Other work for DC included collaborating with Chuck Dixon on a Secret Six one-shot (December 1997) as part of the Tangent Comics imprint and co-creating the Power Company series with writer Kurt Busiek in 2002. Grummett drew stories for both The Death of Superman 30th Anniversary Special #1 (January 2023) and The Return of Superman 30th Anniversary Special #1 (December 2023).

=== Gorilla Comics ===
In 2000, Grummett and Kesel created Section Zero as part of the Gorilla Comics imprint at Image Comics. Gorilla Comics was intended to be a creator-owned company financed by a comics related website, eHero.com. The website proved to be a financial failure, leaving the creators to personally finance their own books. Along with the other Gorilla Comics creators, Kesel and Grummett attempted to continue the series they started, but these efforts proved to be unsuccessful. In January 2012, Kesel announced that he and Grummett relaunch Section Zero as a webcomic on the Mad Genius Comics website. The previously published stories were posted on the site and new material was added as it was completed. A Kickstarter campaign in 2017 allowed Kesel and Grummett to finish the story.

=== Marvel Comics ===
At Marvel Comics, he completed a run as penciller on Thunderbolts, with writer Fabian Nicieza and inker Gary Erskine in 2007 and in 2009 he co-created the X-Men Forever series with Chris Claremont.

== Awards ==
Grummett received an Inkpot Award in 2015.

== Bibliography ==
Interior comics art includes:

=== Aircel Publishing ===
- Shadowalker #1 (1988)

=== Archie Comics ===
- Archie 1955 #1–2 (2019)

=== Dark Horse Comics ===
- Ghost #3 (1995)

=== DC Comics ===
- 9-11 - The World's Finest Comic Book Writers & Artists Tell Stories to Remember Volume 2 (2002)
- Action Comics #665, 667, 727–737, Annual #3 (1991–1997)
- The Adventures of Superman #480–482, 484–491, 493-495 497-506, 550–556, 559-562, 564-566 (1991–1999)
- Animal Man #9, 14 (1989)
- Aquaman vol. 6 #14 (2004)
- Astro City vol. 3 #17 (2015)
- Batman: Brotherhood of the Bat #1 (1996)
- Batman: Dark Knight Gallery #1 (1996)
- Convergence: Speedforce 1–2 (2015)
- Crisis on Infinite Earths Giant #1–2 (2019)
- DC Holiday Special 2017 oneshot (Deathstroke) (2017)
- The Death of Superman 30th Anniversary Special #1 (2023)
- Earth-Prime: Superman & Lois #2 (2022)
- Guy Gardner: Warrior #44 (1996)
- Harley Quinn #50 (among others) (2018)
- Heroes vol. 1–2 HC (2007–2009)
- Infinity-Man and the Forever People #2, 5–6 (2014–2015)
- JLA #61 (2002)
- JLA-Z #2 (2003)
- Justice League vol. 2 #52 (2016)
- Justice League: Alien Justice #4 (promo) (2016)
- Legion of Super-Heroes vol. 4 #94 (1997)
- Legion of Super-Heroes / Bugs Bunny Special #1 (2017)
- Mysteries of Love in Space #1 (2019)
- The New Titans #58–59, 61–67, 71–79, 82–93, 97–100, Annual #5–6 (1989–1993)
- Nightwing / Magilla Gorilla Special #1 (2018)
- Power Company #1–18 (2002–2003)
- Return of Superman 30th Anniversary Special #1 (2023)
- Robin vol. 4 #0–5, 7–10, 14-16 (1993–1995)
- Robin 80th Anniversary 100-Page Super Spectacular #1 (2020)
- Secret Origins vol. 2 #39, 44, Annual #3 (1989)
- Secret Six vol. 2 #1 (1997)
- Showcase '95 #11 (1995)
- Showcase '96 #8 (1996)
- Smallville #7 (2004)
- Superboy vol. 3 #0–8, 11–25, 30, 50–53, 57–79, 100, 1000000 (1994–1996, 1998–2000)
- Superboy/Robin: World's Finest Three #1–2 (1996)
- Superman vol. 2 #57, 133, 200 (1991–2004)
- Superman for the Animals #1 (promo) (2000)
- Superman Forever #1 (1998)
- Superman: The Man of Tomorrow #1–6 (1995–1996)
- Superman Red/Superman Blue #1 (1997)
- Superman: The Wedding Album #1 (1996)
- Teen Titans vol. 3 #7–8, 13–15, 20 (2004–2005)
- Titans #50 (among others) (2001)
- Titans vol. 3 Annual #2 (2018)
- Titans Giant #1 (2020)
- Titans Sell-Out Special #1 (1992)
- Who's Who In The DC Universe #1–5, 8, 10, 11, 14, 16 (1990–1992)
- Wonder Woman vol. 2 #32 (1989)
- Worlds Collide #1 (1994)

==== DC Comics / Marvel Comics ====
- Challengers of the Fantastic #1 (1997)

=== Image Comics ===
- George Pérez's Crimson Plague #1 (Section Zero preview) (2000)
- Section Zero #1–3 (2000)

=== Marvel Comics ===
- AAFES Edition #14 (Avengers), #15 (Iron Man), #16 (Thor), #17 (Captain America) (promo) (2013–2014)
- Age of Ultron Vs. Marvel Zombies #2 (2015)
- The Age of the Sentry #2 (one page) (2008)
- The Amazing Spider-Man #400 (1995)
- The Amazing Spider-Man & Silk: The Spider(fly) Effect #2 (2016)
- Avengers Academy #24–26, 29–31, 34, 37–39 (2012–2013)
- Avengers: The Ultron Imperative #1 (among others) (2001)
- Avengers/Thunderbolts #3–6 (2004)
- Captain America Homecoming #1 (2014)
- Chaos War: Dead Avengers #1–3 (2011)
- Exiles #100 (2008)
- Fantastic Four #525–526, 645 (2005, 2015)
- Fantastic Four vol. 3 #50 (2002)
- Fantastic Four vol. 5 Annual #1 (2014)
- Fear Itself: FF #1 (2011)
- Generation X #9–10, 12–13, 15–16 (1995–1996)
- Guardians of the Galaxy: Rocket's Powerful Plan #1 (promo) (2015)
- Incredible Hulks #635 (2011)
- Indestructible Hulk #18–19 (2014)
- Mystic Arcana Black Knight #1 (2007)
- New Exiles #1–4, 7–10, 13, Annual #1 (2008–2009)
- New Thunderbolts #1–8, 10–14, 17–18 (2005–2006)
- Open Space #1–2 (1989–1990)
- The Prox Transmissions OGN (among others) (2017)
- Silver Surfer vol. 3 #134–137 (1997–1998)
- Thor Annual 2001 #1 (2001)
- Thunderbolts #100–109 (2006–2007)
- Thunderbolts '97 #1 (1997)
- Thunderbolts Presents Zemo Born Better #1–4 (2007)
- Ultimate FF #1–2 (with Mario Guevara) (2014)
- Uncanny X-Men #322, 490, Annual '93 (1993, 1995, 2007)
- X-Men Forever #1–5, 11–15, 18, 24 (2009–2010)
- X-Men Forever 2 #1–3, 6 (2010)

=== Ocean Comics ===
- Popeye Special #2 (1989)

=== Panic Button Press ===
- Holiday Panic! oneshot (2020)
- Section Zero #0 (2018)

=== Star Rider Productions ===
- Star Rider and the Peace Machine #1–2 (1982)

=== Vanguard Graphics ===
- The Privateers #1–2 (1987)

Preceded by George Pérez	The New Titans artist 1989–1993	Succeeded by Bill Jaaska
Preceded by Dan Jurgens	The Adventures of Superman artist 1991–1993	Succeeded by Barry Kitson
Preceded by n/a	Robin artist 1993–1995	Succeeded by Phil Jimenez
Preceded by n/a	Superboy artist 1994–1996	Succeeded by Paul Ryan
Preceded by Tom Morgan	Action Comics artist 1996–1997	Succeeded by Stuart Immonen
Preceded by Manuel Garcia	Thunderbolts artist 2004–2007	Succeeded by Mike Deodato
