= Karl Kesel =

American comic book writer and artist (born 1959)

- Born: January 7, 1959 (age 67) Victor, New York, U.S.
- Areas: Writer, Inker
- Notable works: The Adventures of Superman; Fantastic Four; Daredevil; Harley Quinn; Hawk and Dove (vol. 2 and 3); Superboy (vol. 3); Superman (vol. 2)

Karl Kesel (/ˈkiːsəl/; born January 7, 1959) is an American comics writer and inker whose works have primarily been under contract for DC Comics. He is a member of Periscope Studio and is known for his collaborations with fellow artist Tom Grummett on The Adventures of Superman, Superboy, and Section Zero, as well as the first Harley Quinn comic title.

== Biography ==
=== DC Comics ===
After a friend at college complimented his inking, Karl Kesel began submitting his portfolio to Marvel Comics and DC Comics. Kesel's first work for DC Comics appeared in New Talent Showcase #4 (April 1984). He soon became the inker on Tales of the Legion of Super-Heroes — so soon, in fact, that he suspected that he was assigned New Talent Showcase #8 as a test run to see how well he jelled with Tales of the Legion penciller Terry Shoemaker. Kesel was discouraged that inks which looked smooth and clear on his original pages appeared clunky in the printed comics, and with guidance from Dick Giordano he studied how to draw in a way that would appear better on the printed page. Kesel worked with Stephen DeStefano on the 'Mazing Man series, as well as providing inks over the pencils of George Pérez on History of the DC Universe and John Byrne on Legends and Superman vol. 2. With his then-wife Barbara Kesel, he co-wrote a Hawk and Dove miniseries in 1988 which was drawn by Rob Liefeld. Kesel and artist Tom Grummett are the creators of the modern Superboy character, Kon-El / Conner Kent, who debuted in the "Reign of the Supermen" story arc, starting from The Adventures of Superman #500 (June 1993). Kesel and Grummett also worked on Superboy's solo series, which began publishing in February 1994. In 1996, Kesel and artist Stuart Immonen produced The Final Night limited series. That same year, Kesel was one of the many creators who contributed to the Superman: The Wedding Album one-shot, where Superman and Lois Lane married. Kesel wrote the 10-issue miniseries Batman and Superman: World's Finest (April 1999–January 2000), which explored the post-Crisis history of the eponymous characters, with each of the ten issues taking place one year after the other. Kesel and artist Terry Dodson launched a Harley Quinn ongoing series in December 2000.

=== Marvel Comics ===
Kesel's first work for Marvel Comics was inking a Vision story in Avengers Spotlight #23 (Oct. 1989). He inked Mark Bagley's cover art for the Japan-exclusive Super Famicom video game The Amazing Spider-Man: Lethal Foes in 1995. Kesel wrote Daredevil issues #353–364 (June 1996 – May 1997) and in 2002 wrote the story "Remembrance of Things Past" in which it was revealed that Ben Grimm, the Thing of the Fantastic Four, is Jewish. Kesel wrote and drew a "lost" Captain America comic strip from the 1940s which was published on Marvel Digital Comics Unlimited. In 2011, Kesel scripted a Hulk and the Human Torch story which had been plotted by Jack C. Harris and drawn by Steve Ditko in the 1980s. It was published by Marvel as Incredible Hulk and the Human Torch: From the Marvel Vault #1 (August 2011).

=== Dark Horse Comics ===
Kesel worked with comic book illustrator Brandon McKinney on issues #6 and #13 of the comic series Aliens: Space Marines published by Dark Horse Comics, which accompanied alien figures in the first line of Alien figures released by Kenner in 1992.

=== Gorilla Comics ===
In 2000, Kesel and his former Superboy collaborator Tom Grummett created Section Zero as part of the Gorilla Comics imprint at Image Comics. Gorilla Comics was intended to be a creator-owned company financed by a comics-related website, eHero.com. The website proved to be a financial failure, leaving the creators to personally finance their own books. Along with the other Gorilla Comics creators, Kesel and Grummett attempted to continue the series they started, but these efforts proved to be unsuccessful. In January 2012, Kesel announced that he and Grummett would relaunch Section Zero as a webcomic on the Mad Genius Comics website. The previously published stories were posted on the site and new material was added as it was completed. A Kickstarter campaign in 2017 allowed Kesel and Grummett to finish the story.

== Personal life ==
For several years, Kesel was married to fellow comics writer Barbara Kesel (née Randall), with whom he wrote Hawk and Dove; they have since divorced.

== Awards ==
Kesel was nominated for the Eisner Award for "Best Inker" in 1991 and 1992. In 2016, he was nominated for Inkwell Awards Favorite Inker.

== Bibliography ==
Comics work (as writer unless noted) includes:

=== Dark Horse Comics ===
- Dark Horse Presents #33 (1989)
- Indiana Jones and the Sargasso Pirates #1–4 (1995–1996)

=== DC Comics ===
- Action Comics #692–695, 701 (1993–1994)
- The Adventures of Superman #500–533, 535, 537–550, 552–562, 564–567, #0, Annual #5–7 (1993–1999)
- Aquaman: Sword of Atlantis #46–47 (2006–2007)
- Atari Force #20 (1985)
- Batman and Superman: World's Finest #1–10 (1999–2000)
- Batman '66 Meets The Man from U.N.C.L.E. #1–6 (inker) (2016)
- Batman '66 Meets Wonder Woman '77 #1–10, 12 (inker) (2016–2017)
- DCU Holiday Bash III (1999)
- The Final Night #1–4 (1996)
- Future Quest #3 (inker) (2016)
- Guardians of Metropolis #1–4 (1994–1995)
- Harley Quinn #1–25 (2000–2002)
- Harley Quinn: Our Worlds At War #1 (2001)
- Hawk and Dove vol. 2 #1–5 (also inker) (1988–1989)
- Hawk and Dove vol. 3 #1–25, 28, Annual #1 (1989–1991)
- Hellblazer #9 (inker) (2017)
- History of the DC Universe #1–2 (as inker) (1987)
- Legends #1–6 (as inker) (1986–1987)
- Legends of the DC Universe 80-Page Giant #2 (2000)
- 'Mazing Man #1–12, Special #1–3 (as inker) (1986–1990)
- New Gods Secret Files #1 (1998)
- The New Titans #68–69 (1990)
- Secret Files President Luthor #1 (2001)
- Secret Origins vol. 2 #43; #49 (also artist) (1989–1990)
- Secret Origins 80-Page Giant #1 (1998)
- Showcase '94 #6 (1994)
- Showcase '95 #3 (1995)
- Showcase '96 #8 (1996)
- Silver Age: Challengers of the Unknown #1 (2000)
- Silver Age: Green Lantern #1 (2000)
- Sins of Youth: Superman, Jr. / Superboy, Sr. #1 (2000)
- Superboy vol. 3 #1–10, 12–19, 21–30, 50–79, 100, #0, #1,000,000, Annual #1–2 (1994–2002)
- Superboy / Risk Double-Shot #1 (1998)
- Superboy / Robin: World's Finest Three #1–2 (1996)
- Superboy and the Ravers #1–10, 13–19 (1996–1998)
- Supergirl Annual #1 (1996)
- Supergirl vol. 7 #24 (inker) (2017)
- Superman vol. 2 #4–16, 18, 20 (as inker); #54–56 (as writer and inker) (1987–1991)
- Superman & Savage Dragon: Metropolis #1 (1999)
- Superman / Toyman #1 (1996)
- Superman Forever #1 (1998)
- Superman Red/Superman Blue #1 (1998)
- Superman Secret Files #1 (1998)
- Superman: King of the World #1 (1999)
- Superman: The Legacy of Superman #1 (1993)
- Superman: The Man of Steel #69, #1,000,000 (1997–1998)
- Superman: The Wedding Album #1 (1996)
- Tangent Comics / The Joker #1 (1997)
- Tangent Comics / The Joker's Wild #1 (1998)
- Team Superman Secret Files #1 (1998)
- Who's Who in the DC Universe #2–4, 6 (1990–1991)

=== DC Comics and Marvel Comics ===
- Challengers of the Fantastic #1 (1997)
- Spider-Boy Team-Up #1 (1997)

=== Image Comics ===
- George Pérez's Crimson Plague #1 (Section Zero preview) (2000)
- Section Zero #1–3 (2000)

=== Marvel Comics ===
- All Winners Comics 70th Anniversary Special #1 (2009)
- Amazing Fantasy vol. 2 #13–14 (2005)
- The Amazing Spider-Man Annual #37 (2010)
- The Amazing Spider-Man Family #1 (2008)
- The Avengers vol. 8 #11–12 (inker) (2019)
- Captain America / Citizen V '98 (1998)
- Captain America: Patriot #1–4 (2010–2011)
- Captain America The 1940s Newspaper Strip #1–3 (also artist) (2010)
- Daredevil #353–357, 359-364 (1996–1997)
- Fantastic Four vol. 3 #51–56 (2002)
- Fantastic Four #514–516, 525–526 (writer); #642–644 (inker); #645 (writer/inker) (2004–2005, 2015)
- Fantastic Four / Fantastic 4 '98 (1998)
- Fantastic Four 2099 #1–5 (1996)
- Human Torch #1–12 (2003–2004)
- Marvel Apes #1–4 (2008–2009)
- Marvel Holiday Special '96 (1996)
- Marvels Comics: Fantastic Four #1 (2000)
- Spider-Man Family #7 (2008)
- Ultimate X-Men #72 (2006)
- Web of Spider-Man Super Special #1 (1995)
- What If Doctor Doom Had Become the Thing? #1 (2005)
- X-Men vol. 2 #187 (2006)
- X-Men Unlimited #34 (2002)

=== Marvel Comics and DC Comics ===
- Spider-Boy #1 (1996)
- Unlimited Access #1–4 (1997–1998)

Preceded by Jerry Ordway	The Adventures of Superman writer 1993–1999	Succeeded by Louise Simonson
Preceded by n/a	Superboy vol. 3 writer 1994–1996	Succeeded by Eddie Berganza
Preceded by J. M. DeMatteis	Daredevil writer 1996–1997	Succeeded by Joe Kelly
Preceded by Barbara Kesel	Superboy vol. 3 writer 1998–2000	Succeeded by Jay Faerber
Preceded by n/a	Harley Quinn writer 2000–2002	Succeeded by A. J. Lieberman
Preceded by Carlos Pacheco, Rafael Marín, and Jeph Loeb	Fantastic Four writer 2002 (with Carlos Pacheco and Rafael Marín in early 2002)	Succeeded by Adam Warren
Preceded by Mark Waid	Fantastic Four writer 2005	Succeeded by J. Michael Straczynski
Preceded by Matt Fraction	Fantastic Four writer 2013–2014 (with Matt Fraction)	Succeeded by James Robinson
