= Barry Kitson =

British comics artist

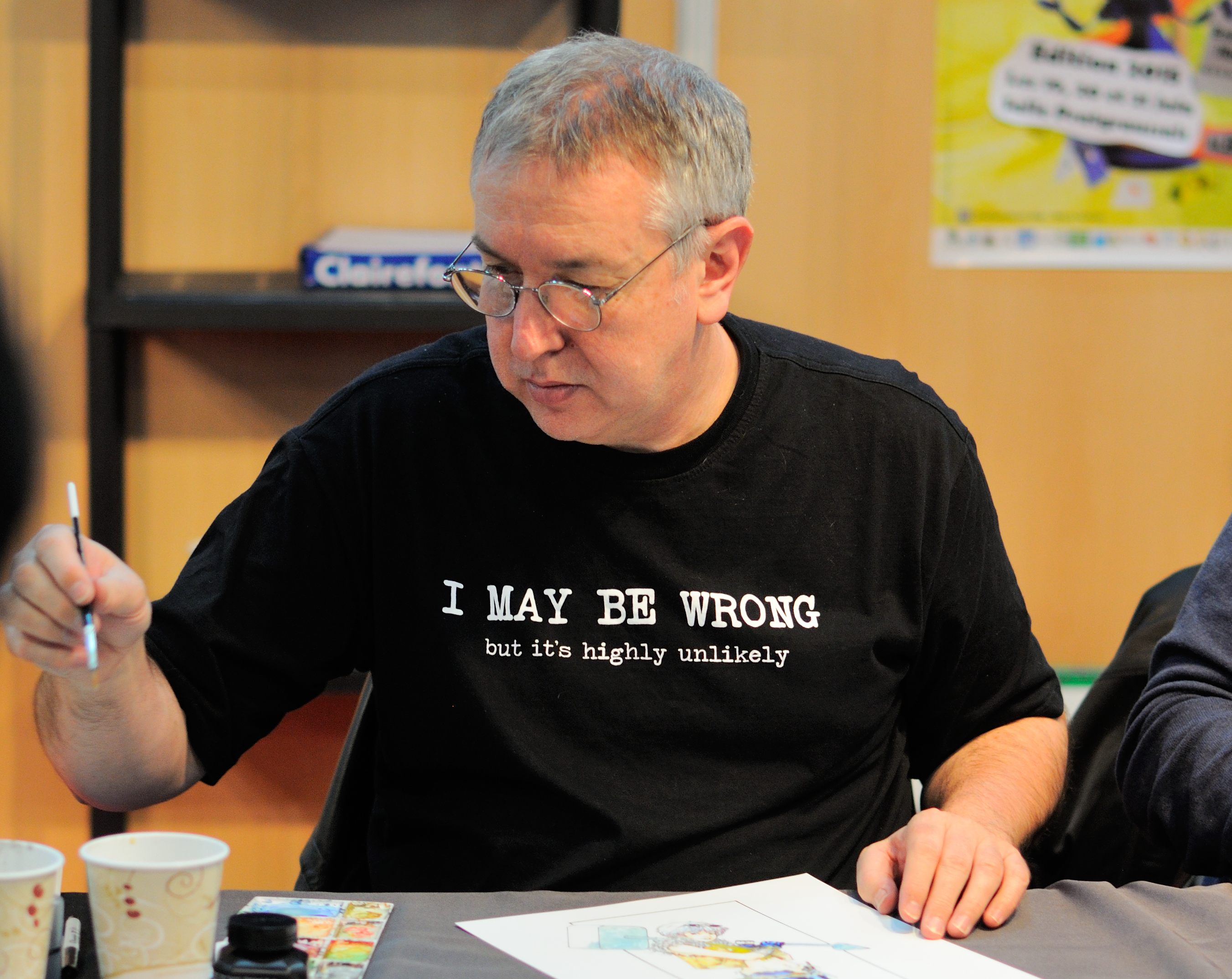
- Kitson in 2014
- Born: December 7, 1957 (age 68)
- Areas: Writer, Penciller, Inker
- Notable works: Azrael; Empire; L.E.G.I.O.N. Legion of Super-Heroes

Barry Kitson is a British comic book artist.

== Biography ==
Kitson's first professional work was Spider-Man for Marvel UK. He also drew many stories for 2000 AD, beginning with a "Future Shocks" tale written by Peter Milligan as well as others by Grant Morrison, and going on to achieve great acclaim with his detailed work on Judge Anderson written by Alan Grant.

Kitson provided illustrations for "Osgood Peabody's Big Green Dream Machine", a Superman text story written by Grant Morrison which appeared in the 1986 British Superman Annual. His first American work for DC Comics was a Batgirl Special published in 1988. He and writers Keith Giffen and Alan Grant launched the L.E.G.I.O.N. series in February 1989. The Azrael series was crafted by Kitson and writer Dennis O'Neil beginning in February 1995. While drawing Azrael, Kitson drew part of the "Contagion" storyline which crossed-over through the various Batman-related titles. Kitson was one of the many artists who contributed to the Superman: The Wedding Album one-shot in 1996 wherein the title character married Lois Lane. With writers Mark Waid and Brian Augustyn, Kitson produced the JLA: Year One limited series which clarified elements of the team's origin. In 2000, Kitson drew a series titled Empire which was written by Waid, whose protagonist was a Doctor Doom-like supervillain named Golgoth who had defeated all superheroes and conquered the world. The series was originally published by Gorilla Comics, a company formed by Waid, Kurt Busiek and several others, but the company folded after only two issues were published. Empire was completed under the DC Comics label in 2003 and 2004. In 2002 he began a run on The Titans and in 2004, he and Waid relaunched Legion of Super-Heroes. for DC Comics and continued on it for two and a half years ending with issue No. 31.

Kitson has worked with Marvel Comics since 2007 on titles including The Order, Secret Invasion: Fantastic Four, and The Amazing Spider-Man. In addition, he has worked on The Incredible Hulk, an Iron Man miniseries, and FF. In 2017, Kitson and Mark Waid collaborated on an Avengers limited series. That same year, Kitson drew a Wonder Woman/Tasmanian Devil one-shot for DC Comics.

== Bibliography ==
=== DC Comics ===
- 9-11: The World's Finest Comic Book Writers & Artists Tell Stories to Remember, Volume Two (2002)
- Action Comics (Catwoman) #611–614 (1988)
- The Adventures of Superman #507–513, 515, 0, 517–519 (1993–1995)
- Azrael #1–19, 21–28, Annual #1–2 (1995–1997)
- Batgirl Special #1 (1988)
- Batman: Book of the Dead, Elseworlds miniseries #1–2 (1999)
- Batman: Legends of the Dark Knight #63, 146–148 (artist); Annual #6 (co-writer) (1994–2001)
- Batman/Punisher: Lake of Fire (1994)
- Batman: Shadow of the Bat #35–38, 43–44, 50 (1995–1996)
- DC Universe: Trinity #1–2 (1993)
- Detective Comics #670 (1994)
- Empire, miniseries, #0, 1–6 (2003–2004)
- Fables #59, 130 (2007–2013)
- Fairest #14 (2013)
- The Flash #84 (1993)
- Flash & Green Lantern: The Brave and the Bold miniseries, #1–6 (1999–2000)
- JLA: Year One limited series #1–12 (1998)
- JSA: All Stars, miniseries, #3 (2003)
- JSA Strange Adventures miniseries #1–6 (2004–2005)
- The Kingdom: Planet Krypton #1 (1999)
- L.E.G.I.O.N. #1–18 (artist); #25–27, 29–37, 39–43, 46–47, 49-50, 53-55, 57 (writer/artist); #38, 44-45, 48, 52, 58-60, Annual #3 (writer) (1989–1993)
- Legends of the Legion #1–4 (1998)
- Legion of Super Heroes vol. 3 Annual #4 (1988)
- Legion of Super-Heroes vol. 5 #1–3, 5–7, 10–13, 16–17, 19, 23–28, 30 (2005–2007)
- Lobo #37 (1997)
- Magnetic Men Featuring Magneto #1 (1997)
- Silver Age: Dial H for Hero #1 (2000)
- Superman vol. 4 #39 (2018)
- Superman Annual (1986)
- Superman: The Wedding Album #1 (1996)
- Teen Titans/Legion Special #1 (2004)
- The Titans #37–40, 42–44, 47–50 (2002–2003)
- Wonder Woman/Tasmanian Devil #1 (2017)
- Worlds' Finest #11 (2013)

=== IPC Magazines ===
- 2000 AD (Future Shocks): #437, 440, 473, 475, 482, 501 (1985–1986); (Judge Anderson): #520–531 (1987); (Judge Dredd): #464–465, 481, 484, 491, 493, 506, 540–541, 557, 562–564, 587, 622, 629–630 (1986–1989)
- Judge Dredd Megazine, vol. 2, #18 (1992)

=== Marvel Comics ===
- Alpha Flight #122–123 (1993)
- The Amazing Spider-Man #558, 574, 577, 583, 586, 590–591, 594, 602, 604, 659 (2008–2011)
- The Avengers #1.1–5.1 (2017)
- Avengers Assemble #18–19 (2013)
- Avengers/Thunderbolts miniseries #1–2 (2004)
- Captain America and Iron Man #633–635 (2012)
- Doctor Strange vol. 6 #12–17 (2019)
- Fantastic Four #602–603 (2012)
- FF #4–5, 10–11 (2011)
- Incredible Hulks #614–616 (2010–2011)
- Iron Man #288, Annual #12 (among other artists) (1991–1993)
- Iron Man 2: Public Identity miniseries #1–3 (2010)
- Iron Man 2.0 #1–3 (among other artists) (2011)
- Marvel Apes #1 (2008)
- The Order #1–4, 6–8 (2007–2008)
- Secret Invasion: Fantastic Four miniseries #1–4 (2008)
- Thor #12.1, 22 (2012)
- Weapon X #13 (2003)
- Web of Spider-Man, vol. 2, #2, 4 (2010)
- Wild Cards #1–4 (1990)
- Wolverine #28–29 (1990)

=== Marvel UK ===
- Spider-Man Weekly #607, 609 with Mike Collins, Mark Farmer and Jerry Paris
- "Spacethieves" in Captain Britain monthly #5–10, with Dave Harper, John Stokes and Jeff Anderson
- Transformers #31–32, 45–46, 48, 50, 59–60, 64 (with Simon Furman, October 1985 – June 1986)

=== Other publishers ===
- Empire #1–2 (with Mark Waid, Gorilla Comics, May–September 2000)

Preceded by n/a	L.E.G.I.O.N. penciller 1989–1993	Succeeded by Arnie Jorgensen
Preceded by Tom Grummett	The Adventures of Superman penciller 1993–1995	Succeeded by Stuart Immonen
Preceded by n/a	Azrael penciller 1995–1997	Succeeded by Doug Braithwaite
Preceded by M. D. Bright	Batman: Shadow of the Bat penciller 1995	Succeeded by Mike Dutkiewicz
