= The Secret of The K-Metal =

Unpublished Superman story

- Cover artwork by Angel Criado and Bob Rivard from the K-Metal from Krypton project website.
- Publisher: Superman Through the Ages!
- Publication date: 2003-2025
- Genre: Superhero
- Main character(s): Superman; Lois Lane

Creative team
- Writer: Jerry Siegel
- Artist: Joe Shuster Studio (original material)
- Penciller(s): Jon Bogdanove, Wayne Boring, Paul Cassidy, Angel Criado, Shane Foley, Leo Nowak, Joe Shuster, John Sikela
- Inker(s): Jon Bogdanove, Wayne Boring, Angel Criado, Ed Dobrotka, Shane Foley, Don Komisarow, Leo Nowak, Bob Rivard, Randy Sargent, Joe Shuster, John Sikela, Costin Stefan
- Letterer(s): Audrey Kinlok, Joe Shuster Studio
- Colorist(s): Angel Criado, Bob Rivard, Randy Sargent, Costin Stefan (restoration)
- Editor: Audrey Kinlok

"The Secret of The K-Metal" is the second installment of The K-Metal from Krypton Trilogy; originally an unpublished Superman comic book story written by Jerry Siegel in 1940 and illustrated by the Joe Shuster Studio. National Comics Publications (later to become DC Comics) never published the story. Although the comic contained plot elements that the publishers may have seen as potentially damaging to the franchise, such as Superman revealing his secret identity to Lois Lane, the reason that the story was never published is ultimately not known. This storyline features the precursor to Kryptonite called "K-Metal" and Lois learning that Clark Kent is Superman.

The story remained forgotten and unknown from 1941 until 1988, when Jerry Siegel's original script and story outline were rediscovered in deep storage in the DC Comics library by Mark Waid.

== Restoration ==
The currently known original story pages were worked on by Wayne Boring, Paul Cassidy, Dan Komisarow, Leo Nowak, John Sikela, and Joe Shuster. Additional contemporary artists contributed to the restoration effort, including Jon Bogdanove, who contributed two pages of new artwork to the project. The comic has been restored, colored, and published online as a mixture of finished original pages and finished pages of contemporary artwork. The website includes all completed pages. Where available, scans of the original 1940 artwork are also included. The restoration team is looking for any additional copies of missing pages that can be found; and aim to replace any redrawn pages with restorations of originals when available.

== The Trilogy ==
The initial goal of the K-Metal restoration project had been to complete and present the original 1940 K-Metal story, previously lost to history. When it became apparent that the completion of this goal was nearing, the team discussed their various ideas for how to continue and expand the project. Ultimately, they agreed on the concept of a trilogy based around the original K-Metal story: adding a prequel episode that consists of Siegel and Shuster's earlier The Reign of the Superman extended with an additional epilogue, and concluding the trilogy with their own all-original, final sequel episode.
