= History of the DC Universe =

Comic book issue by DC Comics

- The cover to the History of the DC Universe trade paperback. Art by Alex Ross.

Publication information
- Publisher: DC Comics
- Format: Limited series
- Publication date: 1986
- No. of issues: 2
- Main character: Harbinger

Creative team
- Created by: Marv Wolfman; George Pérez
- Written by: Marv Wolfman
- Penciller: George Pérez
- Inker: Karl Kesel
- Colorist: Tom Ziuko
- Editor: Mike Gold

Collected editions
- History of the DC Universe: ISBN 1-56389-798-9

History of the DC Universe is a two-issue American comic book limited series created by writer Marv Wolfman and artist George Pérez which was published by DC Comics following the end of Crisis on Infinite Earths.

== Publication history ==
History of the DC Universe was an attempt to summarize the new history of the DC Universe to establish what was canonical after Crisis on Infinite Earths reformed the multiverse into a single universe. In the original planning of Crisis on Infinite Earths, the History would have formed the final two issues, following the destruction of the Multiverse at the beginning of time, but this was changed. History of the DC Universe had been one of the working titles for Crisis on Infinite Earths.

The loose plotline of the series involves the character Harbinger chronicling the past, present, and future of the post-Crisis DC Universe. The history is mostly told through one- and two-page splash pages, accompanied by brief prose. At the end of the series, Harbinger places the history in a capsule and launches it into space. In the subsequent series Millennium, this history is intercepted by the Manhunters and used against Earth's superheroes.

== Portfolio ==
The Next Men characters made a prototypical appearance as "Freaks" in a lithography plate that was published within the History of the DC Universe Portfolio in 1986. Writer/artist John Byrne had originally pitched the series to DC Comics but it never surfaced there. With some changes, Byrne changed the concept to fit in with his work on the graphic novel 2112, to become the John Byrne's Next Men series. Two characters from the "Freaks" artwork somewhat retained their physical looks and became the lead characters of the Next Men series: heroine Jasmine and villain Aldus Hilltop.

The other plates in the portfolio included art by Stephen R. Bissette, Brian Bolland, José Luis García-López, Keith Giffen, Dick Giordano, Joe Kubert, Steve Lightle, Jerry Ordway, George Pérez, Curt Swan, and John Totleben. The cover was painted by Bill Sienkiewicz.

== Collected edition ==
The series was reprinted in hardcover by Graphitti Designs in 1988 with a painted cover by Bill Sienkiewicz. It featured additional material not included in the original series including an introduction by Wolfman and the following:

- essay and Superman illustration by Neal Adams
- essay by Julius Schwartz
- essay by Jerry Siegel with Superman illustration by Joe Shuster
- essay by Bob Kane with Batman illustration by Dick Sprang
- essay and Sgt. Rock illustration by Joe Kubert
- essay by Roy Thomas with Marvel Family illustration by Kurt Schaffenberger
- essay by Paul Levitz with Legion of Super-Heroes illustration by Steve Lightle
- essay by Len Wein with Swamp Thing illustration by Stephen R. Bissette and John Totleben
- essay by Jack Kirby with New Gods illustration by Kirby and Steve Rude
- essay and Aquaman illustration by Ramona Fradon
- essay by George Pérez with Wonder Woman illustration by Trina Robbins and Pérez
- an afterword by Frank Miller
- a gatefold poster featuring 53 characters drawn by Arthur Adams, Neal Adams, Murphy Anderson, Jim Aparo, Stephen R. Bissette, Bret Blevins, Brian Bolland, Pat Broderick, Howard Chaykin, Gene Colan, Ernie Colón, Denys Cowan, Jan Duursema, Ramona Fradon, Dave Gibbons, Keith Giffen, Michael T. Gilbert, Dick Giordano, Mike Grell, Irwin Hasen, Gilbert Hernandez, Jamie Hernandez, Carmine Infantino, Michael Kaluta, Bob Kane, Gil Kane, Jack Kirby, Andy Kubert, Joe Kubert, Steve Lightle, Frank McLaughlin, Jim Mooney, Gray Morrow, Martin Nodell, Paul Norris, Joe Orlando, George Pérez, Mike Royer, Steve Rude, P. Craig Russell, Kurt Schaffenberger, Bill Sienkiewicz, Walt Simonson, Dan Spiegle, Jim Starlin, Joe Staton, Jim Steranko, Dave Stevens, Curt Swan, Frank Thorne, John Totleben, Matt Wagner, Al Williamson, and Mary Wilshire

The series was reprinted as a trade paperback in 2002. It had a new cover painting by Alex Ross but did not include the bonus material from the 1988 hardcover edition. In October 2015 the series was collected once again when it was included as an extra in the Crisis on Infinite Earths Deluxe Edition hardcover collection.

== History of the DCU ==
After the events of Infinite Crisis, DC included a backup feature titled "History of the DCU" in 52, running in issues #2–11 and written by Dan Jurgens. In this version, Donna Troy, now in possession of Harbinger's orb, tells the story of the history of the DCU up to Infinite Crisis.

== History of the Multiverse ==
The backup feature, History of the Multiverse, appears in issues #49–38 of Countdown, as told from the perspective of the Monitors. It was written by Dan Jurgens as well.
