= Gorilla Comics =

American comic book publisher

Gorilla Comics was an American comic book imprint launched in 2000 by creators Kurt Busiek, Tom Grummett, Stuart Immonen, Karl Kesel, Barry Kitson, George Pérez, Mark Waid, and Mike Wieringo. Characters were creator-owned, and books were published through Image Comics.

== Titles ==
- Crimson Plague by George Pérez (originally published through Event Comics)
- Empire by Mark Waid and Barry Kitson (later completed through DC Comics)
- Section Zero by Karl Kesel and Tom Grummett
- Shockrockets by Kurt Busiek and Stuart Immonen
- Superstar by Kurt Busiek and Stuart Immonen
- Tellos by Todd Dezago and Mike Wieringo (originally published through Image Central)

== Closure ==
The founders intended to finance the company through a comics-themed website, eHero.com, which proved unsuccessful. This left creators financing their own books, and only a handful of issues saw print. Only Shockrockets and Tellos completed their initial storylines. The last Gorilla Comics book, Superstar, consisted of a single issue printed in 2001.

Shockrockets was later reprinted in paperback by Dark Horse Comics in August 2004. It was reprinted by IDW Publishing as a hardcover in November 2010. Further Tellos stories were self-published directly through Image Comics. Empire was later completed as a mini-series at DC Comics and released as a paperback in June 2004. Superstar was released by IDW Publishing in April 2011.

In 2012, Karl Kesel and Tom Grummett relaunched Section Zero as a webcomic on the Mad Genius Comics website. The previously published stories were posted on the site and new material was added.

Kesel and Grummett launched a Kickstarter project in May 2017 to publish Section Zero as a standalone graphic novel. Two pledge levels include mini-prints of Section Zero members by George Pérez, Stuart Immonen, Barry Kitson, Mike Wieringo and Tom Grummett, all inked by Karl Kesel. A poster of the "Women of Section Zero" by Adam Hughes, in the style of the "Women of DC" print, was also planned to be made. The project was successfully funded, and the book premiered at the Baltimore Comic Con 2018 in September.
