= Jon Bogdanove =

American comics artist and writer

- Born: May 7, 1958 (age 68) Albany, New York, U.S.
- Areas: Writer, Penciller, Inker
- Notable works: Power Pack; Superman: The Man of Steel
- Awards: Inkpot Award 2013

Jon Bogdanove is an American comics artist and writer. He is best known for his work on Power Pack and Superman: The Man of Steel, as well as for creating the character Steel with writer Louise Simonson in 1993.

== Career ==
=== Comics ===
After attending the School of Visual Arts, Jon Bogdanove's first work for Marvel Comics was Alpha Flight #32 (March 1986). He then became the regular artist on Power Pack as of #22 (May 1986) and would draw that title for the next three years, followed by three months where he wrote it while guest artists handled the drawing. Bogdanove collaborated with writer Chris Claremont on the Fantastic Four vs. the X-Men limited series in 1987 and with Louise Simonson on Power Pack in 1986-1987 and on the X-Factor series the following year. In 1991, Bogdanove began drawing for DC Comics. He, Louise Simonson, and editor Mike Carlin launched a new Superman title, Superman: The Man of Steel – which Bogdanove would draw for nearly eight years until #85 (Jan. 1999). He contributed to the "Panic in the Sky" storyline in 1992. That same year, Bogdanove and Simonson (along with Carlin, Dan Jurgens, Roger Stern and others) were the architects of The Death of Superman storyline, in which Superman died and was resurrected. It was during that storyline, in The Adventures of Superman #500 (June 1993), that Simonson and Bogdanove introduced their character Steel, who graduated to his own title in February 1994. The character went on to feature in an eponymous feature film starring Shaquille O'Neal in 1997. The Bogdanove-drawn Superman: The Man of Steel #30 (Feb. 1994) had a variant edition packaged in a polybag. The logo and all cover copy were printed on the bag and vinyl clings (similar to Colorforms) were included for a do-it-yourself front and back cover. Bogdanove was one of the many artists who contributed to the Superman: The Wedding Album one-shot in 1996 wherein the title character married Lois Lane.

After leaving the Superman: The Man of Steel title, Bogdanove drew two intercompany crossovers for DC Comics: Superman & Savage Dragon: Metropolis (Nov. 1999) co-published with Image Comics and Superman / Aliens II: God War (May 2002 – Nov. 2002) co-published with Dark Horse Comics. Bogdanove reunited with Louise Simonson for the DC Retroactive: Superman – The '90s one-shot in October 2011. In 2023, he drew two new Steel stories, written by Simonson, for The Death of Superman 30th Anniversary Special #1 and The Return of Superman 30th Anniversary Special #1.

=== Film ===
Bogdanove has participated with his son, Kal-El Bogdanove, on assorted film projects including Hansel & Gretel (2006) and the Lady of the Isle television series.

== Awards ==
Bogdanove received an Inkpot Award at San Diego Comic-Con in 2013.

== Relatives ==
Bogdanove is the grandson of muralist Abraham Bogdanove.

== Bibliography ==
=== DC Comics ===
- 52 #15 (Origin of Steel) (2006)
- Action Comics #600 (one page only), #667 (1988, 1991)
- Adventures of Superman #480, 500 (1991–1993)
- Batman #566 (1999)
- Batman '66 #24 (2015)
- Batman '66 Meets the Green Hornet #5 (2014)
- Countdown #21, 15 (2008)
- DC Comics Presents: The Atom #1 (2004)
- DC Infinite Halloween Special #1 (2007)
- DC Retroactive: Superman – The 90's #1 (2011)
- The Death of Superman #11 (webcomic) (2018)
- The Death of Superman 30th Anniversary Special #1 (2023)
- The Multiversity Guide Book #1 (2015)
- Newstime #1 (1993)
- The Return of Superman 30th Anniversary Special #1 (2023)
- Sandman Special #1 (2017)
- Secret Origins of Super-Villains 80–Page Giant #1 (1999)
- Steel #1–3 (writer) (1994)
- Steel Annual #1 (Elseworlds) (writer) (1994)
- Steel: The Official Movie Adaptation (1997)
- Superman vol. 2 #57, 200 (1991, 2004)
- Superman vol. 3 #50 (2016)
- Superman Forever #1 (1998)
- Superman Red/Superman Blue #1 (1998)
- Superman: Secret Files & Origins 2004 (Mxyzptlk story) (2004)
- Superman: The Man of Steel #1–7, 9-14, 16-27, 29-30, 32-37, 39-41, 43-48, 50-53, 55-56, 59-63, 66-68, 75–76, 78-82, 85, #0, 134 (1991–1999, 2003)
- Superman: The Wedding Album #1 (1996)
- Who's Who in the DC Universe #11–13 (1991)
- Who's Who in the DC Universe Update 1993 #1–2 (1992–1993)
- Who's Who Update '87 #5 (1987)

==== DC Comics and Dark Horse Comics ====
- Superman/Aliens II: God War #1–4 (2002)

==== DC Comics and Image Comics ====
- Superman & Savage Dragon: Metropolis #1 (1999)

=== Malibu Comics ===
- Firearm #5 (1994)

=== Marvel Comics ===
- Adventures in Reading Starring the Amazing Spider-Man #1 (promo) (1990)
- Alpha Flight #32 (1986)
- Fantastic Four vs. the X-Men #1–4 (1987)
- The Incredible Hulk vol. 3 #33 (2001)
- The New Mutants Annual #5, 7 (1989–1991)
- Official Handbook of the Marvel Universe #7, 10, 12 (1986)
- Power Pack #22–27, 29, 31–33, 35–36, 42–44, (Note: Due to an editorial mistake, the credits for #45 were also printed in #44, resulting in Jon Bogdanove receiving no credit for #44, which the letters column of Power Pack #47 confirms he both wrote and drew.) 47–52, 54 (1986–1990)
- Solomon Kane #5 (1986)
- What The--?! #1, 8 (1988–1990)
- X-Factor #58, 60–62, Annual #4–5 (1989–1991)
- X-Terminators #1–4 (1988–1989)

=== Storm King Comics ===
- John Carpenter's Tales for a HalloweeNight vol. 1–3 (2015–2017)

== Notes ==
Preceded by Brent Anderson	Power Pack artist 1986–1989	Succeeded by Steve Buccellato
Preceded by Andy Kubert	X-Factor artist 1990–1991	Succeeded by Whilce Portacio
Preceded by n/a	Superman: The Man of Steel artist 1991–1999	Succeeded by Scot Eaton
