= Section Zero =

- Cover to Section Zero #1, art by Tom Grummett and Karl Kesel

Publication information
- Publisher: Image Comics
- Schedule: Monthly
- Format: Ongoing
- Publication date: June–September 2000
- No. of issues: 3
- Main characters: Sam Wildman; Dr. Titania Challenger; Tesla; Thom Talesi; Sargasso

Creative team
- Created by: Karl Kesel and Tom Grummett
- Written by: Karl Kesel
- Penciller: Tom Grummett
- Inker: Karl Kesel

Section Zero is an American comic book series, published in 2000 by Gorilla Comics, a minor comic book company that also acted as an imprint of Image Comics. It was written by Karl Kesel with artwork provided by Tom Grummett.

The series featured a fictional covert organization working for the United Nations. Their mission being the investigation and containment of unexplained phenomena from around the world.

At its start Section Zero was intended to be an ongoing series, but due to financial problems experienced by Gorilla Comics, only three issues were published.

== Publication history ==
The three published issues of Section Zero were dated June, July, and September 2000. A fourth issue was solicited but never published. Gorilla Comics was intended to be a creator-owned company financed by a comics-related website, eHero.com. The website proved a financial failure, leaving the creators to personally finance their own books. Along with the other Gorilla Comics creators, Kesel and Grummett attempted to continue the series they started, but these efforts were unsuccessful. In 2012, Kesel and Grummett relaunched Section Zero as a webcomic on the Mad Genius Comics website. The previously published stories were posted on the site and new material was added.

Kesel and Grummett launched a Kickstarter project in May 2017 to collect all Section Zero work and complete the storyline. The project was successfully funded, and the book premiered at the Baltimore Comic Con 2018 in September. The book and related items began shipping out shortly afterwards.

Kesel and Grummett launched a new website as part of the Kickstarter project, which replaced the older Mad Genius Comics site. The new Panic Button Press site includes information for Section Zero material, and an online store for people to purchase the Kickstarter book, mini-prints, and a full-color print from Adam Hughes.

In December 2018, Kesel teased a new project, which was officially announced as Section Zero 1959 to the original Kickstarter backers in the following month. The Kickstarter for this project launched in Q1 2019 and was successfully funded.

== Characters ==
- Sam Wildman, the team's field leader.
- Dr. Titania Challenger, the last living member of a family of scientific adventurers. She is also Sam Wildman's ex-wife.
- Tesla, a childlike alien who pilots the team's flying saucer. Tesla has no memory of his life before he began working for Section Zero.
- Thom Talesi, an American teenager of Asian descent. Tom has a magical tattoo that allows him to transform into an insect-like being for a 24-hour period.
- A. J. Keeler, the group's leader. Keeler also secretly leads the Ghost Soldiers, a second covert group that may or may not be working against the best interests of Section Zero.
- Sargasso, a reptilian being who worked for Section Zero in the 1960s and 1970s only to be found in the present.

== Plot synopsis ==
In the first issue, after rescuing Thom Talesi from a murderous mob in the Southeast Asian country Siatok, Sam Wildman, Titania Challenger, and Tesla recruit him into Section Zero. Shortly after returning to the abandoned Air Force base that serves as Section Zero's HQ, the team is sent to investigate a series of livestock killings in Australia. After they leave, A.J. Keeler contacts the Ghost Soldiers and orders them to follow.

Issue #2 finds the team discovering and rescuing Sargasso from a cave inside Ayers Rock. Not long after this, they find themselves in a fight with a saber-toothed tiger that ends when it drags Titania Challenger though a portal shaped like a ring of fire.

In the third issue, after attempting to seek the Ring of Fire, the team journeys to its last known stable location, the abandoned subway tunnels beneath New York City. There they face the forces of the Rat King. After defeating their foes, the team is confronted by the Ghost Soldiers.

Although it was never released, issue #4 had a brief plot teaser at the bottom of issue #3's letters page:

Doc Challenger fights alone in a forgotten land of monsters, myths and legend—uncovering an important clue to the unexplained phenomena that haunts our world. But will she live to use it? Also: is she friend or foe? Introducing the fiery femme fatale known as—Lava!
