= Superman Red/Superman Blue =

DC comic book storylines

"The Amazing Story of Superman-Red and Superman-Blue!" "Superman Red/Superman Blue"
- Cover of Superman Red/Superman Blue #1 (February 1998), art by Dan Jurgens.
- Publisher: DC Comics
- Publication date: (original); July 1963 (adaptation); February–June 1998
- Genre: Superhero; Crossover
Title(s)
(original)
Superman #162
(adaptation)
Action Comics #742-744
The Adventures of Superman #555-557
Aquaman (vol. 4) #43
Challengers of the Unknown (vol. 5) #15
Steel (vol. 2) #50
Supergirl (vol. 4) #20
Superman (vol. 2) #132-135
Superman: The Man of Steel #77-79
Superman: The Man of Tomorrow #10
Superman Red/Superman Blue #1
Teen Titans (vol. 2) #19
- Main character: Superman

"Superman Red/Superman Blue" refers to two comic book storylines published by DC Comics featuring Superman.

== Silver Age ==
Supergirl is introduced to Superman-Red and Superman-Blue, art by Curt Swan.

The original Superman-Red/Superman-Blue tale, "The Amazing Story of Superman-Red and Superman-Blue!", is an Elseworlds tale that first appeared in Superman #162 (July 1963). The script was written by Leo Dorfman, with art by Curt Swan.

In the story, Superman is compelled to finish a list of unaccomplished goals, which includes restoring the shrunken city of Kandor to its original size and eliminating crime and evil from Earth. In order to accomplish these goals, Superman invents a machine, powered by various types of kryptonite, that will increase his intelligence. The machine works, increasing Superman's intelligence a hundredfold, but with the unexpected side effect of splitting Superman into twin beings, sporting red and blue costumes.

The Supermen, using their enhanced intellects, first repair Brainiac's "enlarging ray". They then create a means to bring all the fragments of Krypton together, creating a "New Krypton" (eliminating all existing kryptonite in the process), and successfully enlarge Kandor on its surface. At the urging of Lori Lemaris, the Supermen create an underwater world for the citizens of Atlantis and arrange an interstellar voyage to transport them to their new home. The two Supermen go on to create an "anti-evil" ray which can cure criminal tendencies in anyone. They place the ray into satellites in orbit around the Earth, curing not only villains such as Lex Luthor and Mr. Mxyzptlk, but reforming Communists such as Nikita Khrushchev and Fidel Castro. The reformed Luthor goes on to invent a serum that cures all known diseases, which the Supermen put into the water supply. Supergirl then releases the Phantom Zone inmates, also reformed by the ray, and they immigrate to New Krypton in a spaceship provided by the Legion of Super-Heroes.

With nearly all of the world's problems solved, the two Supermen now have the opportunity to deal with personal matters. The split allows them to resolve the love triangle between Superman, Lois Lane, and Lana Lang. Superman-Red proposes to Lois, while Superman-Blue asks Lana to marry him. Each woman claims her own Superman, and they have a triple wedding: Superman-Blue and Lana, Superman-Red and Lois, and Lucy Lane marrying Jimmy Olsen. Red decides to live on New Krypton with Lois, renouncing his powers and raising a family, while Blue remains on Earth and retires to devote his life to scientific research.

== Bronze Age ==
Superman-Red and Superman-Blue appeared again in a story that was first published in 1981 in Germany, with the issue Superman Album. The story was published in English in 1982 in the oversized issue Superman Spectacular. In this story, red kryptonite causes Superman to be temporarily split into Superman-Red and Superman-Blue. The two Superman work together to battle Lex Luthor and Terra-Man.

== Modern Age ==
The second incarnation of Superman Red and Superman Blue began in a 1998 storyline. While temporarily deprived of the solar energy required to give him powers, Superman had developed energy-based abilities, which forced him to use a containment suit to prevent his energy from dispersing. Superman also gained the ability to turn his powers "off", though this takes time to control and leaves him with the durability of a normal human in his depowered state.

In the Superman Red/Superman Blue one-shot (February 1998), a trap created by Cyborg Superman and Toyman causes Superman to split into two beings who represent different aspects of his personality, with each believing himself to be the original. Superman Blue is the more cerebral entity, preferring to think his way out of situations. Superman Red is more rash, but also more decisive, preferring action over taking the time to think. Over time, the two Superman grow apart, with neither wanting to recombine. Following a battle with the Millennium Giants (Cabraca, Cerne and Sekhmet), the two Supermen reunite, with Superman returning to his original powers and costume.

== DC Rebirth ==
The story arc "Superman Reborn" references Superman Red and Superman Blue by associating Superman's post-New 52 self with red and the pre-New 52 Superman with blue. The story concludes with the merging of both halves into one complete version of Superman with a history combining elements of both.

A version of Superman-Blue from the Dark Multiverse appears in Dark Nights: Metal. In Adventures of Superman: Jon Kent, Jon Kent develops electric powers similar to those of the Supermen.

Superman Red & Blue is also the name of a 2021 anthology miniseries with a stylistically muted color palette, emphasizing the red and blue of Superman's costume.

== In other media ==
- Superman-Red and Superman-Blue appear in the Superman 75th Year Anniversary short.
- Superman-Red and Superman-Blue serve as inspiration for the Justice League Action episode "Superman Red vs Superman Blue", where Lex Luthor accidentally splits Superman using a kryptonite weapon.
- Superman-Red and Superman-Blue is referenced in the My Adventures with Superman episode "My Adventures with Supergirl". After charging in the Sun's core, Superman and Supergirl respectively manifest blue and red energy.
- Superman-Red and Superman-Blue's costumes appear in the Harley Quinn episode "The Big Apricot" as exhibits in the Metropolis Superman Museum.
