= Superman: The Man of Steel =

Comic book series by DC Comics (1991-2003)

- Superman: The Man of Steel #1 (July 1991), cover art by Jon Bogdanove.

Publication information
- Publisher: DC Comics
- Schedule: Monthly
- Format: Ongoing while in publication
- Publication date: July 1991 – March 2003
- No. of issues: 136 (#1–134 plus issues numbered #0 and #1,000,000) and 6 Annuals
- Main character: Superman

Creative team
- Written by: Mark Schultz; Louise Simonson
- Penciller(s): Jon Bogdanove; Doug Mahnke
- Inker(s): Dennis Janke; Tom Nguyen

Superman: The Man of Steel is a monthly American comic book series that ran for 136 issues from 1991 to 2003, featuring Superman and published by DC Comics. As a result of introducing this series alongside its already existing titles, DC Comics was able to publish a new Superman comic each week. Included in these 136 issues were two special issues: #0 (October 1994, published between issues #37 and #38) and #1,000,000 (November 1998, published between issues #83 and #84), which were tie-ins to Zero Hour: Crisis in Time and DC One Million, respectively.

== Publication history ==
The first issue was written by Louise Simonson and featured pencils by Jon Bogdanove, Tom Grummett, Bob McLeod, and Dan Jurgens. Inks were by Dennis Janke, Jerry Ordway, and Brett Breeding. Simonson wrote issues #1–56, 59–83, 86, #0 and Annuals #2, 4, and 6 from 1991 to 1999. Bogdanove pencilled issues #1–68, 75–82, 85, and #0 during the same period and returned for the final issue, #134, in 2003.

Issues #9 and 10 were part of the "Panic in the Sky" storyline in 1992. Issues #22 through 26 were a part of "The Reign of the Supermen" storyline which received the Comics Buyer's Guide Fan Award for "Favorite Comic-Book Story" for 1993. After his introduction in The Adventures of Superman #500 (June 1993), Steel briefly became the starring character of the Superman: The Man of Steel series. Issue #30 (Feb. 1994) had a variant edition packaged in a polybag. The logo and all cover copy were printed on the bag and vinyl clings (similar to Colorforms) were included for a do-it-yourself front and back cover. Writer Mark Schultz and artist Doug Mahnke became the new creative team on the title with issue #87 (March 1999). Schultz and Mahnke introduced a new version of Superman's Fortress of Solitude in issue #100 (May 2000).

== Annuals ==
From 1992 to 1997, DC published six issues of Superman: The Man of Steel Annual. The stories tied into the crossover or themes that were featured in DC's annuals that year. These were:

- Annual #1 (1992) – Eclipso: The Darkness Within
- Annual #2 (1993) – Bloodlines
- Annual #3 (1994) – Elseworlds
- Annual #4 (1995) – Year One
- Annual #5 (1996) – Legends of the Dead Earth
- Annual #6 (1997) – Pulp Heroes

== Gallery ==
In December 1995, a special Superman: The Man of Steel Gallery #1 was published. It features 22 pin-ups drawn by several artists.

== Collected editions ==
- Superman: Panic in the Sky includes Superman: The Man of Steel #9–10, 188 pages, March 1993, ISBN 1-56389-094-1
- The Death of Superman includes Superman: The Man of Steel #17–19, 172 pages, January 1993, ISBN 1-56389-097-6
- World Without a Superman includes Superman: The Man of Steel #20–21, 240 pages, April 1993, ISBN 1-56389-118-2
- The Return of Superman includes Superman: The Man of Steel #22–26, 480 pages, September 1993, ISBN 1-56389-149-2
- The Death and Return of Superman Omnibus includes Superman: The Man of Steel #17–26, 784 pages, September 2007, ISBN 1-4012-1550-5
- Superman: The Death of Clark Kent includes Superman: The Man of Steel #44–46, 320 pages, May 1997, ISBN 1-56389-323-1
- Superman: The Trial of Superman includes Superman: The Man of Steel #50–52, 272 pages, November 1997, ISBN 1-56389-331-2
- Superman: The Wedding and Beyond includes Superman: The Man of Steel #63, 192 pages, January 1998, ISBN 1-56389-392-4
- Superman: Transformed! includes Superman: The Man of Steel #64 and 67, 197 pages, April 1998, ISBN 1-56389-406-8
- Superman vs. the Revenge Squad includes Superman: The Man of Steel #61 and 65, 144 pages, February 1999, ISBN 1-56389-487-4
- Superman: No Limits! includes Superman: The Man of Steel #95–97, 212 pages, November 2000, ISBN 1-56389-699-0
- Superman: Endgame includes Superman: The Man of Steel #98, 180 pages, January 2001, ISBN 1-56389-701-6
- Superman: 'Til Death Do Us Part includes Superman: The Man of Steel #99–100, 228 pages, December 2001, ISBN 1-56389-862-4
- Superman: Critical Condition includes Superman: The Man of Steel #101–102, 196 pages, February 2003, ISBN 1-56389-949-3
- Superman: Emperor Joker includes Superman: The Man of Steel #104–105, 256 pages, January 2007, ISBN 1-4012-1193-3
- Superman: President Lex includes Superman: The Man of Steel #108–110, 244 pages, June 2003, ISBN 1-56389-974-4
- Superman: Our Worlds at War, Vol. 1 includes Superman: The Man of Steel #115–116, 264 pages, September 2002, ISBN 1-56389-915-9
- Superman: Our Worlds at War, Vol. 2 includes Superman: The Man of Steel #117, 264 pages, September 2002, ISBN 1-56389-916-7
- Superman: Our Worlds at War Complete Edition includes Superman: The Man of Steel #115–117, 512 pages, June 2006, ISBN 1-4012-1129-1
- Superman: Return to Krypton includes Superman: The Man of Steel #111 and 128, 212 pages, February 2004, ISBN 1-4012-0194-6
- Superman: Ending Battle includes Superman: The Man of Steel #130–131, 192 pages, May 2009, ISBN 1-4012-0194-6

=== Superman: The Man of Steel trade paperback series ===
The title, Superman: The Man of Steel, would be used again for a series of trade paperbacks collecting the early adventures of the post-Crisis Superman. The first volume collects and retitles The Man of Steel limited series.

Volume	Material collected	ISBN
1	The Man of Steel #1–6	ISBN 978-0930289287
2	Superman vol. 2, #1–3; Action Comics #584–586; The Adventures of Superman #424–426	ISBN 1-40120-005-2
3	Superman vol. 2, #4–6; Action Comics #587–589; The Adventures of Superman #427–429	ISBN 1-40120-246-2
4	Superman vol. 2, #7–8; The Adventures of Superman #430–431; Action Comics #590–591; Legion of Super-Heroes #37–38	ISBN 1-40120-455-4
5	The Adventures of Superman #432–435; Action Comics #592–593; Superman vol. 2, #9–11	ISBN 1-40120-948-3
6	Superman vol. 2, #12; Superman Annual #1; Action Comics #594–595; Action Comics Annual #1; The Adventures of Superman Annual #1; Booster Gold #23	ISBN 1-40121-679-X
7	Superman vol. 2 #13–15; Action Comics #596–597; Adventures of Superman #436–438	SC: 1-40123-820-3
8	Action Comics #598–600, Superman vol. 2 #16–18 and Adventures of Superman #439–440	978-1401243913
9	Superman vol. 2 #19–22; Adventures of Superman #441–444 and Superman Annual #2; Doom Patrol vol. 2 #10	978-1401266370
