= Rex the Wonder Dog =

- Rex the Wonder Dog from Green Lantern (vol. 3) #30 (October 1992).

Publication information
- Publisher: DC Comics
- First appearance: Rex the Wonder Dog #1 (January/February 1952)
- Created by: Robert Kanigher; Alex Toth

In-story information
- Alter ego: Rex
- Species: Domestic dog (Canis lupus familiaris)
- Team affiliations: Bureau of Amplified Animals; K-9 Corps; Ravers; Shadowpact; Space Canine Patrol Agents
- Notable aliases: Wondrous Rex
- Abilities: Ability to communicate to all humans and animals, longevity, exceptional strength, speed, stamina, and intelligence, unspecified mystical powers/strengths.

Rex the Wonder Dog is a superhero dog appearing in American comic books published by DC Comics. Created in 1952 by Robert Kanigher of Wonder Woman fame and artist Alex Toth, Rex has sometimes been compared to Superman's dog Krypto, who was created three years later. While the two canine crime fighters do share some similarities, they are decidedly different.

Rex shares his name with a canine film actor "Rex the Wonder Dog", from numerous silent films of the 1920s.

== Publication history ==
Rex the Wonder Dog first starred in his own bi-monthly series, The Adventures of Rex the Wonder Dog #1 – 46 (January/February 1952 – September/October 1959), titled Rex the Wonder Dog for issues #1 and #2. The series was written by Robert Kanigher, and was illustrated for the first three issues by Alex Toth and Sy Barry. From issue #2 (March/April 1952) almost every issue had one Rex story written by Kanigher and one written by John Broome. From issue #4, the stories were drawn by Gil Kane and mostly inked by Bernard Sachs, although from issue #29 (September/October 1956) a few issues had scripts by Bob Haney instead of Kanigher. Gil Kane and Sy Barry also drew all of the distinctive covers. The title was cancelled after issue #46 (November–December 1959).

After the cancellation, Rex did not appear again for another 18 years, until he was re-introduced by writer Steve Englehart in Justice League of America #144 (July 1977), a flashback issue to 1960 which featured a number of minor 1950s DC Comics characters that had once had their own series. After this there were only sporadic appearances: a 'Whatever happened to ...' tale in DC Comics Presents #35 (July 1981) written by Mike Tiefenbacher with art by Gil Kane, Secret Origins #48 (April 1990), The Flash (vol. 2) #46 – 47 (January – February 1991), Green Lantern (vol. 3) #30 – 31 (October 1992) and the linked The Flash (vol. 2) #70 (November 1992), and Guy Gardner: Warrior #29 (March 1995). Rex then had a supporting role in Superboy and the Ravers (September 1996 – March 1998), and later Day of Vengeance: Infinite Crisis Special #1 (March 2006), which led directly into Rex making a number of appearances in Shadowpact (July 2006 – July 2008).

== Fictional character biography ==
Rex is a White Shepherd dog who spent his early years in the U.S. Army's K-9 Corps, alongside his brother, Pooch. Early in his training it became apparent that Rex had great potential, which resulted in Dr. Anabolus selecting him as a test subject for a super-soldier serum. After receiving an injection of the serum, Rex found himself endowed with great strength, speed, stamina, and intelligence. Dr. Anabolus was killed by a Nazi spy soon after, and as Anabolus left no records, this led to Rex being the only dog of his kind. Rex served during World War II, acting during the Italian campaign and earning an unspecified medal for saving his handler Lieutenant Dennis from a German patrol, and later receiving a Silver Star for saving POWs. He and then Captain, later Major, Dennis followed this by serving in the Pacific campaign against Japan, and later in Korea.

After his army career, Rex was adopted by Major Dennis and his family. Not long after moving into his new home, Rex began a new career as a crime solver when Dennis's son Phillip was accused of murder and, when the police were unable to solve the crime, Rex succeeded in finding all the requisite clues to clear Phillip's name. Soon after, he was made an honorary Forest Ranger and became a Hollywood stunt dog. In most of his subsequent adventures, he would be seen accompanying Phillip's younger brother Danny.

Over the next few years, as well as solving a never-ending series of burglaries, robberies, murders and other crimes, becoming a film star and a circus actor, and daring natural disasters such as forest fires and thick snow, Rex also managed to survive attacks from lions, wolves, bears, panthers, and even octopuses (twice). He could ride a horse, or bull, and proved an expert bullfighter. He often operated small appliances such as cameras, swung on ropes and vines to save people. Many of Rex's adventures took place in the American Midwest, but a number happened in Europe, Asia and especially Africa (largely as a result of Major Dennis being involved in various archaeological expeditions). Rex added to his military medals when he was decorated for bravery by the French Foreign Legion in North Africa, after one of several adventures with them, and added further to his awards when he became an honorary Native American Indian Chief, and an Honorary Fire Chief.

Occasionally Rex was forced to perform heroic acts in strange circumstances. Wearing very cool protective shades he once witnessed a nuclear explosion, then fought the Tyrannosaurus rex and pterodactyl that appeared from an underground world as a result of the seismic shift, and fought frozen mammoths on several occasions. In Australia he met an alien, Xstar, and helped him recapture an escaped creature. He soon met Xstar again to solve an outer space crime becoming 'Wonder Dog of Earth' in the process. While staying with a scientist friend of the family, John Rayburn, who created a formula to shrink living beings to microscopic size. They had a number of adventures at a much-reduced size in a sub-atomic world. Pre-empting Ray Palmer, The Atom by over a year, using the formula in reverse, they had several adventures in a giant-sized 'super-atomic world'.

Around this time, Rex was involved in thwarting an attempted invasion of Earth by Martians with the future founding members of the Justice League of America: The Flash, Superman, Wonder Woman, Batman and Green Lantern, among others. After this, he and Danny Dennis became a circus act for many years, where Detective Chimp came to see them and got involved in an adventure with an aging Rex. Taken to the Caribbean, Rex and Detective Chimp accidentally drank from the lost Fountain of Youth and were both rejuvenated. Some years later, Lt. Colonel Daniel Dennis and Rex became part of a U.S. Moon landing team, Rex becoming 'America's first Wonder Dog on The Moon' in the process.

By 1991, it became clear that more than a new lease of life had happened to Rex. While saving the world from Gorilla Grodd, 'the dog at the heart of the world, the dog for whom the universe has waited' (as he now described himself) confidently communicated with the newly sentient animals of Central City, and persuaded them to fight against Grodd. No reason was given for this new ability, but shortly afterwards Rex joined 'The Bureau of Amplified Animals', an organisation of animals with abnormally high intellect run by Detective Chimp to help mankind, and was instrumental in defeating Grodd again, also revealing that he can speak, and possesses 'the knowledge of force of mind, and how to use it'. Detective Chimp later explained that both his and Rex's new powers were another effect of drinking from the Fountain of Youth.

=== Working without Danny ===
At some point after this, it appears that Danny and Rex parted company, as the now ageing Danny does not feature in Rex's later adventures. After being (accidentally) involved in a fight between almost every DC hero and many villains at the opening of Guy Gardner's bar 'Warriors', Rex later became attached to Hero Cruz (also known as HERO) sometime before he became a member of 'Superboy and The Ravers', and lived with him in Metropolis. Hero, owner of the "H-Dial" from 'Dial H for Hero', later made reference to having discovered Rex imprisoned in a metal box. It is known that Hero found the H-Dial and other heroic relics after breaking into a weapons cache owned by the villainous Scavenger; but it is unknown whether, although likely that, Rex had previously been captured and was found during the same raid. Rex's part in the Ravers adventures was minor, and showed little of his powers. How long he stayed with Hero afterwards is unknown, but Rex was next seen, without Hero, assisting the mystical team Shadowpact in battling the Seven Deadly Enemies of Man, which had been loosed in Gotham City. During this event, Rex was taken over by the entity known as 'Sloth' – a situation rectified by his friend Detective Chimp.

Shortly afterwards it is confirmed that Rex held a place in DCs pantheon of mystical powered characters when first he was called as one of Earth's most powerful magical characters to aid the Spectre in saving the universe. Soon after he is one of the many agents tasked by the Phantom Stranger to monitor a mystical bubble that contained the town of Riverrock, Wyoming and the newly formed Shadowpact vowing to stay until Detective Chimp was freed, and as a result ended up staying a year. The Shadowpact free themselves through other means. He later deliberately allows himself to be influenced by the Huntsman's Hellhound Pack to infiltrate them, but became trapped with the pack, and spent a considerable amount of time using his intelligence to become their leader, although he eventually aided Shadowpact to beat The Huntsman and return to Earth.

=== Relatives ===
His brother, Billy, affectionately known as 'Pooch', became the mascot of Gunner and Sarge of 'Losers' during World War II. His adventures were documented in 'Our Fighting Forces' and several series of 'The Losers' for DC Comics and the Vertigo imprint. Without Rex's powers, Pooch followed Gunner and Sarge through thick and thin, was wounded multiple times and received the honorary rank of Sergeant. He perished alongside Gunner, Sarge, and The Losers near the end of World War II. An alternate-universe story places the death of those heroes on Dinosaur Island.

== Powers and abilities ==
Originally Army trained, Rex has augmented abilities far beyond those of normal dogs derived from the Fountain of Youth. These include exceptional strength, speed, stamina, longevity, and intelligence, as well as the ability to communicate with most humans and all animals. He has also exhibited unspecified other enhanced powers as a result of this, and is acknowledged as a member of DC's magical and mystical community.
