= David Graves =

David Graves may refer to:

- David Graves (politician) (born 1947), member of the Georgia House of Representatives
- David Graves (character), a DC Comics supervillain
- David Graves (bishop) (born 1958), United Methodist bishop
- David W. Graves (born 1953), American educator and theologian
- David Bibb Graves (1873–1942), governor of Alabama
