= Rutland Halloween Parade =

Annual event

The Rutland Halloween Parade is an annual event held on (or around) Halloween in the city of Rutland, Vermont, since 1960. The parade has a strong superhero theme and has been the setting for a number of fictional comic book adventures. Local officials maintain that it is one of the largest and longest running Halloween parades in the United States.

== History ==
Tom Fagan (1932–2008), a local writer and comic book fan, is credited with having a hand in the parade's early development and superhero theme. The parade began as an annual tradition in 1959; Fagan had letters and text pieces promoting the parade published in a number of DC and Marvel titles, including DC's Detective Comics #327 (May 1964) and Marvel's Avengers #88 (May 1971). According to a 2006 Boston Globe article, "in 1965 ... the Joker, Plastic Man, and Dr. Strange were roaming the streets of Rutland, along with Batman (presumably Fagan, but like Bruce Wayne, the Caped Crusader wouldn't divulge his identity). More comic book heroes appeared every year. ... " According to a 2008 Comics Buyer's Guide obituary of Fagan ...

5,000 spectators watched the 11th annual parade in 1970, with marchers who included the Black Panther, Scarlet Witch, Black Widow, Medusa, Wasp, Quicksilver, Vision, Captain America, and Havok. Riding on a float were Thor and Sif, along with the Norn Queen. The Red Skull hitched a ride on the float for no known thematic reason. ... Also present were Nighthawk, Batman, and Captain Marvel — and probably a few other DC heroes that Fagan was discreet enough not to mention. The parade kicked off, he noted, with the familiar cry of "Avengers Assemble!" and ended on the same note."

The 2006 Boston Globe story explains that "... Fagan was friends with many comic book authors and artists, most of whom hailed from New York. Fagan persuaded some of them to take part in the Rutland Halloween Parade in comic book character costumes. Many creators stayed as guests at Fagan's 24-room mansion outside of Rutland, which has since become the Antique Mansion Bed & Breakfast. Comic book creators known to have attended the parade over the years include Steve Englehart, Gerry Conway, Marv Wolfman, Bernie Wrightson, Dennis O'Neil, Roy Thomas, Alan Weiss, Wendy and Richard Pini, Dave Cockrum, and Len Wein.

=== After Fagan ===
By the mid-2000s, Fagan was no longer directly involved in the planning of the parade. The event continued nonetheless, with Fagan and a close personal friend of the 'inner circle' attending as a guest in 2006 and 2007, sitting with the judges. Fagan planned to attend the parade in 2008, but died on October 21 of that year. An article eulogizing Fagan in the Rutland Herald stated, "Without Tom, there wouldn't be a Halloween parade in Rutland. ... That's his legacy." The parade celebrated its 50th anniversary in 2009.

== Appearances in comics ==
The Rutland Halloween Parade as portrayed in Avengers #83, by Roy Thomas, John Buscema, and Tom Palmer (Marvel Comics, Dec. 1970).

In the 1970s, the Rutland Halloween Parade achieved a degree of fame when it was used as the setting of a number of superhero comic books, in titles published by industry rivals DC Comics and Marvel Comics. The first appearance of the parade was in Avengers #83, published by Marvel with a cover-date of December 1970; this was followed by DC's Batman #237, with a cover-date of December 1971.

Tom Fagan appeared as a character in a number of stories, usually depicted as an acquaintance of the title characters. Due to the nature of the masquerade parade, these issues often saw people dressed as Marvel heroes appearing in DC publications, and vice versa, marking some of the first (unofficial) intercompany crossovers in comics. Caution was exercised, however, over widespread use of the competition's characters — Fagan (who in real life typically hosted the parade dressed as Batman), was usually drawn as Nighthawk in Marvel-published Rutland Halloween stories.

In the fall of 1972, writers Steve Englehart, Gerry Conway, and Len Wein crafted a loose three-part story spanning titles from both companies. Each comic featured Englehart, Conway, Wein, and Wein's wife Glynis interacting with Fagan and Marvel or DC characters. Beginning in Amazing Adventures #16 (by Englehart with art by Bob Brown and Frank McLaughlin), Beast hitches a ride from Englehart, who is driving the Weins and Conway to Rutland. The story terminates after Juggernaut attempts to steal Englehart's car. The action continues in Justice League of America #103 (by Wein, Dick Dillin and Dick Giordano), with Batman and other Justice League members wind up leading the parade while attempting to capture Felix Faust. Faust steals Englehart's car, but is pulled over by the police. In the third part of the unofficial crossover, Thor #207 (by Conway, John Buscema, and Vince Colletta), the three comics creators (and one wife) again visit Fagan, during which Faust stealing Englehart's car is depicted for a second time.

In the letters page of What If? #22 (August 1980), a reader asked, "Does Rutland, Vermont, annually become a nexus of realities similar to that existing in the swamp near Citrusville, Florida?". Marvel editor Mark Gruenwald, writing as the Watcher, responded, "While the nexus in Citrusville is a natural aperture, the nexus near Rutland is an artificial one that fluctuates in size and accessibility. For reasons that I have not investigated, it has not been opened in recent years."

In 1986, the parade again appeared in WaRP Graphics' Thunderbunny #5. The town of Rutland was portrayed in DC's Animal Man #50 (1992), but not the Halloween parade itself. Most recently, the parade was featured in Marvel Comic's Generation X #22 (1996) and Superboy and the Ravers #16 (1997) from DC Comics.

=== Chronological list of appearances ===
note: Not all of these appearances feature the Halloween Parade. Some feature Tom Fagan and some simply the town of Rutland.

- Avengers #83 — "Come On In, The Revolution's Fine!" by Roy Thomas, John Buscema, and Tom Palmer (Marvel, Dec. 1970)
- Batman #237 — "Night of the Reaper!" by Dennis O'Neil, Neal Adams, and Dick Giordano (DC, Dec. 1971)
- Marvel Feature #2 — "Nightmare on Bald Mountain!" by Roy Thomas, Ross Andru, and Sal Buscema (Marvel, Mar. 1972)
- Thor #206 — "Rebirth!" by Gerry Conway, John Buscema, and Vince Colletta (Marvel, Dec. 1972)
- Justice League of America #103 — "A Stranger Walks among Us!" by Len Wein, Dick Dillin, and Dick Giordano (DC, Dec. 1972)
- Amazing Adventures #16 — "...And the Juggernaut Will Get You ... If You Don't Watch Out!" by Steve Englehart, Marie Severin, Bob Brown, and Frank McLaughlin (Marvel, Jan. 1973)
- Thor #207 — "Firesword!" by Gerry Conway, John Buscema, and Vince Colletta (Marvel, Jan. 1973)
- Avengers #119 — "Night of The Collector," by Steve Englehart, Bob Brown, and Don Heck (Marvel, Jan. 1974)
- Thor #232 — "Lo, the Raging Battle!" by Gerry Conway, John Buscema, Dick Giordano, and Terry Austin (Marvel, Feb. 1975)
- Occult Files of Dr. Spektor #18 — "Masque Macabre," by Donald F. Glut and Jesse Santos (Gold Key, Dec. 1975)
- Freedom Fighters #6 — "Witching Hour for the Warrior Wizards!" by Bob Rozakis, Ramona Fradon, and Bob Smith (DC, Jan./Feb. 1977)
- Justice League of America #145 — "The Carnival of Souls!" by Steve Englehart, Dick Dillin, and Frank McLaughlin (DC, Aug. 1977)
- DC Super Stars #18 — "The Gargoyles," by Martin Pasko, Romeo Tanghal, and Dick Giordano (DC, Jan./Feb. 1978)
- Ghosts #95 — "All the Stage Is a Haunt," by Paul Kupperberg, Michael R. Adams, and Tex Blaisdell (DC, Dec. 1980)
- Defenders #100 — by J. M. DeMatteis, Don Perlin, and Joe Sinnott (Marvel, Oct. 1981)
- Thunderbunny #5 "Moonlight Miss," by Martin L. Greim and Brian Buniak (WaRP Graphics, Feb. 1986)
- Animal Man #50 — "Journal of a Plague Year," by Tom Veitch and Steve Dillon (DC, Aug. 1992)
- Generation X #22 — "All Hallows Eve," by Scott Lobdell, Chris Bachalo, Al Vey, and Scott Hanna (Marvel, Dec. 1996)
- Superboy and the Ravers #16 — "Half-Life of the Party," by Steve Mattsson, Karl Kesel, Josh Hood, and Dan Davis (DC, Dec. 1997)
