= Scavenger (comics) =

Publication information
- Publisher: DC Comics
- First appearance: (Mortimer); Aquaman #37 (January 1968) (Unrevealed); Superboy (vol. 4) #2 (March 1994)
- Created by: (Mortimer); Henry Boltinoff (writer); Nick Cardy (artist) (Unrevealed); Karl Kesel (writer); Tom Grummett (artist)

In-story information
- Alter ego: Peter Mortimer; Unrevealed
- Species: Human
- Team affiliations: (Unrevealed) Secret Society of Super-Villains
- Notable aliases: (Mortimer) Barracuda
- Abilities: Both were humans using advanced technology.

The Scavenger is the name of two supervillains appearing in American comic books published by DC Comics. The first Scavenger was Peter Mortimer, an Aquaman villain who debuted in Aquaman #37 (January 1968), and was created by Bob Haney and Nick Cardy. He is re-introduced in the New 52 series Aquaman by writer Geoff Johns and artist Paul Pelletier.

The second Scavenger first appeared in Superboy (vol. 4) #2 (March 1994), and was created by Karl Kesel and Tom Grummett.

== Fictional character biography ==
=== Peter Mortimer ===
In his first appearance, the first Scavenger seeks the Time Decelerator, an alien device left on Earth, which transports him to a timeless, limbo-like dimension. He later escapes and is transported to Skartaris, where he gains mystical powers and battles the Warlord.

In his next appearance, the Scavenger reforms and befriends Aquaman. However, a later encounter with Hawkman retconned his redemption, stating that Peter Mortimer was secretly part of a child sex ring. Moreover, he now calls himself Barracuda and explains that he is the avatar of the barracuda, just as Hawkman is the avatar of the hawk. After Barracuda attempts to kill both Aquaman and Hawkman, Hawkman kills him.

In The New 52, after the events of Throne of Atlantis, Mortimer begins scouring the ocean floor for Atlantean technology and weaponry to sell to the highest bidder. He, along with villains such as the Weapons Master, the Key, the Scarecrow, Captain Cold, and the Cheetah are attacked, captured, tortured, and interrogated by David Graves, who intends to acquire information on the members of the Justice League.

Mortimer is among the villains recruited by the Crime Syndicate of America during the events of the Forever Evil story arc. He is later captured along with several other members of the Secret Society by the reformed Justice League in the aftermath of the Crime Syndicate's defeat.

=== Second Scavenger ===
The second Scavenger first appeared in Superboy (vol. 4) #2. He is an old man, with a wide range of weaponry at his disposal. Little of the man's history has been revealed. In Superboy and the Ravers, he claims to have been a member of the Argonauts who challenged the gods, which led to his dilemmas later in life. He believes he is being persecuted by an enemy from his past, and stockpiles weapons and gadgets to be ready when the enemy strikes. Scavenger later joins the Secret Society headed by Alexander Luthor Jr. and is sent to Gotham City, where he and several other villains attack the Gotham police.

== Other versions ==
Two alternate universe variants of Scavenger appear in the Flashpoint universe/timeline. The first was a member of Deathstroke's pirate crew before being killed by Aquaman. The second appeared in Flashpoint Beyond as a hitman who killed Barry Allen and Harvey Dent before being killed in turn by the Thomas Wayne version of Batman.

== In other media ==
- An original incarnation of Scavenger named Petyr Mortikov appears in Aquaman: King of Atlantis, voiced by Andrew Morgado.
- The Flashpoint incarnation of Scavenger appears in Justice League: The Flashpoint Paradox.
- The second Scavenger appears as a character summon in Scribblenauts Unmasked: A DC Comics Adventure.
