= Hero Cruz =

Publication information
- Publisher: DC Comics
- First appearance: Superboy and the Ravers #1 (September 1996)
- Created by: Karl Kesel (writer); Steve Mattsson (artist)

In-story information
- Alter ego: Hero Cruz
- Team affiliations: The Ravers; The Titans
- Abilities: Derive from Hero Dial artifact

Hero Cruz is a fictional character in comic books published by DC Comics. Within the narrative of the fictional DC Universe, Hero is a portrayal of a Latino gay superhero of African descent. He first appeared in Superboy and the Ravers (September 1996) and was created by Karl Kesel and Steve Mattsson.

According to Richard T. Rodríguez in Graphic Borders, Hero is an updated take on the concept of a gay superhero: "Unlike the earlier, effeminate characterization of Extraño nine years before, Hero Cruz was fashioned as a character who was unmistakably masculine and who didn't wear his homosexuality on his sleeve".

== Fictional character biography ==
Hero Cruz is introduced as a member the superhero team The Ravers, founded by Superboy. He is a frequent regular of the Event Horizon, an intergalactic rave featuring hipsters and partiers from all over the galaxy. Though at first it was unclear what, if any, powers he possessed, it is later revealed that his Achilles Vest emits a force field that protects him from physical attacks. Hero eventually loses the vest, but discovers the "H-Dial". By spelling H-E-R-O on its dial, he gains the powers of and persona of one of several superheroes, supposedly merging with them using hypertime. Hero's superhero personas appear to be heterosexual, causing various "configurations of straight and gay expressions of desire".

Since acquiring this device, Hero has taken on the roles of heroes like BadAxe (an axe-wielding warrior), and Human Justice (a powerful, deity-like figure). Later in the series, he assumes the form of Titanic in a bid to impress his female teammate Sparx, but is unsuccessful. Hero becomes distant from Sparx, eventually avoiding her altogether. Following a trip to Sparx's family ranch in Canada, Hero finally admits that he is gay. Near the end of the Ravers series, Sparx begins to lose her powers, and in frustration tells Hero that she does not want to be his friend any more and that what he was doing was "not natural" and "wrong". Hero has since been in a relationship with the alien Leander and has decided to keep tabs on everyone else in the Rave.

Hero was also an associate of Titans L.A. in The Titans.

== Powers and abilities ==
The H-Dial (Hero Dial) gives Hero the ability to turn into any of a number of superheroes. The extent of this power is unknown, yet it appears to utilize hypertime. Among the hero forms he has used are:

- Badaxe
- Human Justice
- Stormfront
- Titanic
- Feathered Serpent
- Hot Head
- Death's Head Moth
- Ferronaut
- Captain Elastic
- Diamond Lord
- Isis
- Radio Ranger
- Faust
- Caduceus the Healer
- Viridian Paladin
- Port
