= Snapper Carr =

- Snapper Carr as depicted in Dial H for Hero #5 (September 2019). Art by Joe Quinones.

Publication information
- Publisher: DC Comics
- First appearance: The Brave and the Bold #28 (February–March 1960)
- Created by: Gardner Fox (writer); Mike Sekowsky (artist)

In-story information
- Full name: Lucas "Snapper" Carr
- Team affiliations: Justice League; Blasters; Young Justice; Checkmate
- Notable aliases: Pawn 922; Star-Tsar
- Abilities: Computer operation Demolitions expert Electrical engineering Espionage; Skilled hacker Surveillance; Teleportation

Lucas "Snapper" Carr is a character appearing in American comic books published by DC Comics. The character was created by writer Gardner Fox and penciller Mike Sekowsky, and first appeared in The Brave and the Bold in February 1960. From 1960 to 1969, Snapper Carr appeared as a supporting character to the Justice League of America. The character occasionally appeared in comics featuring the Justice League from 1969 to 1989, when he gained superpowers during the Invasion! event.

Snapper was associated with a new superhero team, The Blasters, in various comics until 1993, when he lost his powers and became a main character in the Hourman comic book, beginning in 1999. After the cancellation of Hourman in April 2001, he became a main character in the Young Justice comic book beginning in December 2001. Young Justice was cancelled in May 2003, and he became associated with the governmental organization Checkmate, a role revealed when the character played a small but important role in the 2007–2008 limited series comic book 52 Aftermath: The Four Horsemen. The character made major appearances in Final Crisis: Resist in December 2008 and Justice League of America 80-Page Giant in November 2009.

== Creation and early characterization ==
In 1959, after the successful revival of the Flash and Green Lantern, DC Comics editor Julius Schwartz decided to update the Justice Society of America using a new group of heroes under the name Justice League of America (JLA). (Note: Schwartz's suggestion may have been prompted by a proposal from comic book artist and writer Larry Ivie, who earlier that same year had met with DC Comics editors and pitched both an updated JSA (which he called "Justice League") and a "sons and daughters of" version of the Justice Society of America.) According to Schwartz, DC Comics Executive Editor Whitney Ellsworth (Note: His exact title is not clear, as most sources use the term "Executive Editor", while an authoritative source within the comic book industry uses the term "Editor-in-Chief".) not only insisted that a teenager be a member of the Justice League but also that this teenager be hip. Ellsworth wanted the new superhero team to tap into the emerging and economically powerful youth culture, and specifically told Schwartz to have the character emulate the hip-talking, leather jacket-wearing, finger-snapping "Kookie" Kookson character on the popular television series 77 Sunset Strip. The teenager had to be a "civilian" (i.e., non-superhero). A hip version of an existing teenage superhero, such as Robin, Supergirl, or existing teenage "civilian" such as Jimmy Olsen was ruled out, as these characters would tend to over-emphasize the hero with whom they were already associated. To preserve the "team" nature of the new comic book, therefore, a "neutral" civilian character had to be created.

Ellsworth specifically coined the name "Snapper Carr", the character's first name indicating his habit of snapping his fingers when excited or making a point. Snapper's given name of Lucas was not revealed until 1978.

Snapper Carr made his first appearance, alongside the first appearance of the JLA, in the comic book The Brave and the Bold #28, released on December 29, 1959, but with a cover date of February–March 1960.

Snapper Carr was not intended to be a superhero, but rather a supporting character for the Justice League. Because of the critical role he played in the League's first adventure, he was formally made an "honorary member" of the JLA, and was often referred to as the team's mascot. At the end of the first adventure, Snapper received a belt with a signal device embedded in the buckle, with which he can summon members of the JLA. In keeping with his "hip" character, Justice League members later rebuilt a hot rod car so that it could fly and whisk Snapper to JLA meetings.

As written by Gardner Fox, Snapper Carr had the most distinctive personality of all the members of the Justice League. Snapper not only had the most distinctive means of speaking (with his extreme hipster slang), but he had the most clearly written and individualist character of all the recurring characters in the comic book. Within a few years, Fox got rid of the hipster slang and had Snapper speak in a more mainstream way.

Snapper's parents are identified in The Brave and the Bold #28 as Mr. and Mrs. John Carr. Two years later, readers learn in 1961 that he has a younger brother, Jimmy Carr. Snapper Carr was given a girlfriend, Midge, in Justice League of America #7 (November 1961). Snapper was also shown in 1974 to have a sister, Janet. In 1998, readers learned that Snapper had an uncle, Simon Carr, who played a major role in the founding of the Justice League. A year later, Snapper mentioned in Hourman #1 that he has a brother nicknamed "Spitter" Carr (for his habit of spitting). It is unclear if Spitter and Jimmy are the same person, or if Snapper was merely being sarcastic.

== Fictional character biography ==
=== Membership in the Justice League ===
In The Brave and the Bold #28, the Justice League of America (Note: The story makes it clear that the Justice League has existed for some time before the events of the story.) faces the threat of Starro, a starfish-like alien with mind-control powers. Snapper Carr, who is spreading lime on his family's lawn, is unaffected by Starro when the alien takes mental control of the population of Happy Harbor, Rhode Island. Members of the Justice League realize that Starro can be incapacitated using lime, and the alien is defeated. Comic book historian Ramzi Fawaz has argued that this adventure is a critical one in the development of the modern comic book. Not only does it mark the beginning of the superhero who identifies as a defender of the world rather than a nation, it marks the first time that a world-destroying (rather than nation-destroying) threat was depicted in comics. Snapper Carr's inclusion was also important. Whereas pre-World War II social norms had emphasized family connections as the most important relationships in a young person's life, the Justice League offered a new kind of relationship, based solely on "ethical commitments to the world", which could supplant the family. Snapper also represented a new egalitarian future, one in which youth could be accepted alongside older adults rather than patronized or excluded. For example, Snapper's first year as an honorary member of the JLA coincided with his senior year of high school. In "Man, Thy Name Is—Brother!", three League members donate their time to help Snapper write a paper about brotherhood.

In the 1985–1986 crossover Crisis on Infinite Earths, DC Comics rebooted its fictional universe and the back-stories of nearly all its characters. This required retellings of many of origin stories, including that of the Justice League of America. The first adventures of the Justice League, and that of Snapper Carr, were retold in the 12-issue maxi-series comic book JLA: Year One. The first several issues of the maxi-series involved the alien Appellaxians, which had first appeared in Justice League of America #9 (February 1962). In the fictional character chronology, this story occurs before and shortly after The Brave and the Bold #28, but in the publication history of the character it is printed in 1998. In the story, the Appellaxians conspired with a new criminal organization, Locus, to take over Earth. Snapper's uncle, Simon Carr, made his first appearance in the second issue. It is revealed that Simon is a contact for an ultra-wealthy individual (later revealed to be Oliver Queen) who wishes to financially support the Justice League in its mission. Simon introduced the League to college student and genius inventor Ted Kord (who would become the superhero Blue Beetle), who provided them with some technology, and to his nephew, Snapper. The adventure with Starro took place between JLA: Year One issues #3 and #4, and Snapper played a critical role in issue #9 in alerting the League to the Appellaxian attack on Earth. In issue #10, he deduced that his uncle had been possessed by the Appellaxian leader, and had the League defeat Simon and then free him from alien control.

==== Betrayal of the JLA ====
Gardner Fox left Justice League of America with issue #65, and Dennis O'Neil took over scripting duties. By this time, Snapper Carr was immensely unpopular. O'Neil felt Snapper was outdated and no longer fit with the Justice League. He considered two options: Letting the character disappear without explanation, or writing the character out of the book. O'Neil decided on the latter, even if it seemed abrupt.

By the time the story "Snapper Carr—Super Traitor!" appeared, Snapper Carr had not been present in any Justice League of America stories for some time. The story begins with Snapper shown to be upset by the fact that people are interested in him only because of what he knows about the Justice League, and not because he is a hero in his own right. He is confronted by John Dough, "the most average man in America", who wants to rid the world of superheroes. Snapper helps Dough kidnap Batman, and addresses a public rally condemning superheroes. The crowd riots, and the Justice League members (except for new member Black Canary) lose control of their powers. After a fake Batman attacks people attending a congressional hearing into causes of the riot, Snapper resigns his honorary membership in the Justice League. When the League returns to its Secret Sanctuary (located in a seaside cave near Happy Harbor), they are attacked by Dough—who turns out to be the Joker. Joker reveals that Snapper told him the location of the League's Secret Sanctuary. The League captures the Joker, but Snapper has departed.

Although the Secret Sanctuary had been compromised seven times before, (Note: The hideout had been located and breached by Weapons Master in The Brave and the Bold #29 (May 1960); by Despero in Justice League of America #1 (November 1960); by Kanjar Ro in Justice League of America #3 (March 1961); by Captain Cold, Clock King, Doctor Destiny, Electric Man, Getaway Mastermind, Puppet Master, and Professor Menace] in Justice League of America #5 (July 1961); by Doctor Light in Justice League of America #12 (June 1962); by Joe Parry in Justice League of America #3 (November 1964); and by the Key in Justice League of America #3 (December 1965).) the JLA now decided to abandon the base and build a new headquarters, the Justice League Satellite. It occupied this orbital hideout in February 1970. (Note: According to O'Neil, he decided on a satellite rather than an earthbound headquarters because it seemed "cooler" and because it fit with the science fiction-style stories which had predominated in Justice League of America for the past several years.)

"Snapper Carr—Super Traitor!" was the last Joker story for four years, and the last time the Silver Age Joker was seen in print. A much darker, more gothic Joker later appeared in Batman #251, and is the first appearance of the modern Joker. This story also arguably marked the end of the Silver Age version of the Justice League of America as well. Although Snapper Carr was, in later comic book appearances, shown to have made money by writing a memoir about his time with the League, he was also depicted as feeling immense shame for having been tricked by the Joker into betraying the team.

==== Role in the Justice League ====
Snapper's role in the Justice League was a varied one. In many early adventures, he often (and unintentionally) provided information or scientific clues which enabled the League to solve mysteries or defeat enemies. For example, in the team's third published adventure, "Case of the Stolen Super Powers!", several important zoo specimens have gone missing. Snapper mentions a few facts about long-lived creatures that he's incorporating into a term paper. Members of the JLA realize that the missing animals were all long-lived. This enables them to deduce the plans of Professor Ivo (who is trying to create an immortality serum) and defeat his android, Amazo.

Usually, Snapper was depicted on "monitor duty", using the JLA computers and satellites to monitor national and world events for trouble to which the heroes could respond. Later, he was depicted as being a journalist, reporting on the League's activities and providing the "official" record of their exploits, as well as overseeing the JLA's mail handling and processing and responding to fans and admirers. Throughout the comic book series JLA: Year One, Snapper was also depicted as a mechanic and I.T. worker, overseeing the installation of a great deal of technology in the Secret Sanctuary and maintaining the hideout's machinery.

=== Post-JLA ===
In the character's fictional biography, Snapper Carr made a number of appearances between 1969 and 1989.

His first appearance came in 1972 100th issue, a story in which the JLA has a celebration. Snapper is invited to attend, but is too ashamed by his betrayal of the League to do so.

His second appearance came in 1974, when Justice League of America writer Len Wein decided to have Snapper and his family get kidnapped by a mentally ill man calling himself Anakronus. Anakronus claims to be a supervillain who has attacked the Justice League numerous times, but Snapper knows that the man has never tangled with the League before. Snapper succeeds in having Anakronus tell his (rather lengthy) stories about how he destroyed the League. This prevents the man from killing the Carr family for several hours. Members of the JLA show up and easily apprehend Anakronus.

=== The Star-Tsar ===
The Snapper Carr character was depicted as a supervillain in 1977.

The Key was a villain who had brainwashed Snapper in 1965, and induced him to poison the JLA's food. In 1968, Key implanted a post-hypnotic suggestion in the members of the JLA, which forced them to stay in their headquarters for one hour. At the end of that time, they would kill one another. Key planned for Snapper to kill Superman with a kryptonite ray-gun. Key battled the Justice League again in 1974, attempting to blow up the city of St. Louis, Missouri, but Snapper Carr was not present for this event (having resigned from the JLA five years earlier).

The Key's 1977 involvement with Snapper Carr came in the story "The Face of the Star-Tsar!" Doctor Light, a long-time JLA foe, attempts to access the JLA Satellite. Mark Shaw, the former villainous Manhunter now in a new guise as the heroic Privateer, tries to stop him but is defeated. The JLA arrives and Light flees, only to run into a new villain—the Star-Tsar. When the JLA catches up to the two villains, the Star-Tsar flees to Washington, D.C. and attacks an embassy there. The JLA apprehend the Star-Tsar's henchmen and find Snapper Carr lurking nearby. The JLA then rush off to Doctor Light's underwater lair in a lake in New York City's Central Park. Anticipating their arrival, Doctor Light traps the heroes with a device that phases them into another dimension. The Star-Tsar helps the Justice League escape before fleeing himself. Trapped in his own hideout by the JLA, Light blows a hole in the wall and escapes. Leaving the villain's lair, the JLA discover the unconscious Star-Tsar, who had been knocked out by debris from the blast. They unmask him, only to discover that the Star-Tsar is Snapper Carr.

The story continued in "The Key—Or Not The Key", with Snapper/Star-Tsar freed by Star-Tsar henchmen. Several League members trace the henchmen's flying getaway vehicles to the Star-Tsar's lair. They are swiftly captured by Key. Meanwhile, in Happy Harbor, other JLA members try to talk to Snapper Carr's family in an attempt to understand why Snapper would have turned to crime. Janet Carr bitterly tells the heroes that Snapper was unable to attend college or find employment because of his past association with the Justice League, and had been living a life of misery and poverty. As Janet spoke to them, the Star-Tsar attacked Happy Harbor. But after seeing Janet, he broke off his attack and fled. The JLA members followed the Star-Tsar to Key's hideout, but Snapper—dressed as the Star-Tsar—tried to warn them that they were falling into a trap. A second Star-Tsar appeared and incapacitated everyone. Later, this second Star-Tsar set off bombs in Washington, D.C., and threatened President Jimmy Carter with more explosions if he did not pay a ransom. In Key's hideout, Snapper found himself imprisoned alongside the other JLAers. He told them how Key found him, destitute and depressed, and offered to supply him with weapons and money if he attacked the JLA. Desperate to feel good about himself, Snapper agreed to participate in Key's plan. Snapper said Key, disguised as the Star-Tsar, must have attacked the embassy in Washington. Feeling remorse for attacking his friends, Snapper decided to expose Key by attacking Happy Harbor (knowing full well that the JLA would easily track him). The JLA soon free themselves, and discovered that Key had suffered a horrible accident that left him with a doll-sized body but normal-sized head. The heroes deduced that since Key could not run in his robotic, humanoid body, there must be a third Star-Tsar. Red Tornado then exposes Mark Shaw as the third Star-Tsar. (Note: Red Tornado explains that Shaw was not among those imprisoned by the second Star-Tsar. While the JLA was imprisoned, the bomb attack on Washington occurred. Shaw unwittingly revealed that he knew about the attack, even though he should not have had this information. These coincidences and observations led Red Tornado to deduce that Shaw had not reformed, and was a third Star-Tsar.) At the end of the story, Superman says he will not send Snapper Carr to jail, and has something else in mind for him.

=== Post-Star-Tsar ===
The Snapper Carr character made a number of appearances in The Superman Family comic book from 1978 to 1982. Superman gets Snapper at job at S.T.A.R. Labs, a research corporation devoted to creating high-tech weapons and prisons to handle various supervillain and alien menaces. Snapper surreptitiously stole the wreck of a Kryptonian space-sled in the story "Birthright of Power!", and briefly appeared in the story "Kandor vs. Supergirl" as a witness at the trial of Supergirl. He helped defend her in the follow-on story by gathering letters of recommendation from Justice League members, and then was hired as an assistant by Supergirl's foster father Fred Danvers. Three issues later, he made a brief appearance in the Supergirl story "What Goes Up Can't Come Down" and its conclusion "The Gravity War". At the end of "Nightmare in New Athens", Snapper is shown to have used the space-sled to fix a Superboy robot, (Note: It was established in the comic book Superman's Pal Jimmy Olsen in June 1959 that Superboy built androids with limited superpowers to help protect his secret identity (so he could appear alongside "Superboy" as Clark Kent, or vice versa), to safeguard his parents, to protect Earth when he was away on extended space missions, and to handle situations involving kryptonite. Superman also built Superman robots as well. The robots were essentially written out of the comic books involving Superboy and Superman in 1971, when stories established that rising pollution levels in Earth's atmosphere made them unstable and unusable.) but a disembodied intelligence takes control of the android. In "The Screamin' Demon", it is revealed that student teacher Paul French has tried to wipe the memories of his criminal past by developing a "transistorized brain". Somehow, it all went wrong, and while he slept his unconscious mind seized control of the robot (Supergirl briefly battled the robot before Paul woke).

The Snapper Carr character also played a role in the resignation of Green Arrow from the JLA. The story, which is told in flashback, depicted Black Canary and Green Arrow investigating an explosion at the Star City Museum. They were attacked by the Star-Tsar, felled, and hospitalized. Snapper Carr, who just happened to be in Star City, arrives at the hospital to tell them that his Star-Tsar suit was stolen from the Metropolis police by an astronomer named Richard Rigel, who was working on technology powered by starlight. Green Arrow manages to stop the new Star-Tsar by deducing where he will attack next, but not before members of the JLA almost allow the villain to kill thousands of people. In annoyed at the JLA's conduct, Green Arrow resigned from the Justice League.

Writer Gerry Conway brought Snapper Carr back to the Justice League for the comic book's 200th issue. A post-hypnotic suggestion makes the League's original seven members try to reassemble the seven Appellaxian meteorites from the 1962 adventure and use them to clone new Appellaxians who will initiate a second invasion of Earth. Snapper Carr waits with superhero Firestorm aboard the JLA Satellite, while the other heroes battle the aliens.

The Snapper Carr character appeared again in 1999 in the comic book Legends of the DC Universe. In the fictional character chronology, this story occurs some time after Green Arrow's 1980 resignation from the Justice League, but before Green Arrow rejoins the League in 1982. In this story ("Critical Mass Stages 1-5"/"Critical Mass Stages 6-16"), Snapper witnesses five JLA members growing to monstrous size. He believes this is a side-effect of a long-ago attack by a minor villain named Packrat. Snapper finds Green Arrow, who locates Packrat's shrink ray and restores the heroes to their correct size. As Snapper departs, Green Arrow tells the boy that he needs to forgive himself.

=== The Blasters ===
In 1989, DC Comics published a three-issue limited series titled Invasion!. The Dominators, an alien race usually seen in the Legion of Super-Heroes comics, decide to invade Earth to learn the secret of the metagene—a gene that can give certain human beings superpowers. In the first issue of Invasion!, it is revealed that thousands of Earthlings have been kidnapped and taken to the Dominator homeworld, where they are forced to run a gauntlet of traps and experiments known as "the Blaster". Six humans, including Snapper Carr, survive the Blaster, an indication that they have the metagene. The Blaster itself forces the metagene in each person to manifest, and Snapper gains the ability to teleport whenever he snaps his fingers. In the third issue, these six new heroes are transferred to Starlag, a Dominator prison. There, they meet up with the extraterrestrial superhero team the Omega Men. They also meet Brainiac 2 and his super-team, the Licensed Extra-Governmental Interstellar Operatives Network (L.E.G.I.O.N.). Together, the three groups break out of Starlag and flee aboard a shuttle piloted by the feline alien, Churljenkins. They run into a superhero task force led by Superman, and assist in the invasion of the Dominator homeworld. There, they discover a cure for the Dominators' "gene bomb" (a device which accelerates metagene activity and destabilizes superpowers, ending with the death of the person with the metagene). Snapper and his group, now called the Blasters, return to Earth while Churljenkins joins the Omega Men and flies off into space.

The Snapper Carr character next appeared in a one-shot comic, Blasters. The story in this comic book begins with Snapper Carr in an alien insane asylum. Snapper had decided to keep his eyes open during a teleport, to see what occurs. On his dismay, he witnessed an eternity of time passing, and was driven temporarily insane. The reader also learns that each of the Blasters has had trouble adjusting to their new superpowers, and are also incarcerated in the asylum. Snapper escapes by teleporting directly to Churljenkins' ship, which had broken down on an alien world. Churljenkins restores Snapper's sanity, and the two of them repair the ship and flee—stranding the Omega Men. They learn that the Dominators have destroyed the Churljenkins' home planet, so they return to Earth. On the journey there, they discover that the Spider Guild (an alien race of humanoid arachnids) has created a weapons depot near Earth. Snapper breaks the Blasters out of the hospital, and the team destroys the depot.

==== Valor and the loss of Snapper's hands ====
The Snapper Carr character next appeared in the comic book Valor. The planet Daxam had helped the Dominators invade Earth, but were convinced by Superman to switch sides. The Daxamites, a sub-species of Kryptonian, also gain superpowers under a yellow sun, and this vast army of supermen helped turn the tide and save Earth. The father of Lar Gand (later named Mon-El) died during this battle. Deciding to honor his father, Lar Gand becomes a superhero, joins L.E.G.I.O.N., and meets Superman—who gives him the name Valor. Snapper Carr's involvement in the Valor story begins after Valor is accidentally imprisoned on Starlag II, a Dominator prison near a red sun. Valor signals for help, and his artificial intelligence unit sends for the Blasters. By this time, the Blasters had a number of adventures (none of them depicted in the comic book, just mentioned by the characters) which had turned out poorly, and were about to disband. While rescuing Valor, the team accidentally releases the energy being known as The Unimaginable. (Note: The Unimaginable had first appeared as an enemy of the Justice League in 1966. Snapper Carr was not part of that story.) Valor and the Blasters battle The Unimaginable, and Valor escapes Starlag II. The Blasters, however, become trapped there.

Some time thereafter, Snapper Carr and the Blasters are able to escape Starlag II, but Snapper becomes separated from his friends (their escape, and how Snapper became separated from them, is not depicted in any comic). In stories first published in 2000, but occurring in the character's chronology at a point after the adventure with Valor, Snapper finds himself being pursued by the Khunds, an aggressive alien species. Snapper is captured, and his fingers are locked together to prevent him from teleporting. Snapper mulls over his past, and concludes that he has always been a disappointment—first to the Justice League, then to the Blasters. The Khunds torture Snapper, then cut off his hands—depriving him of the ability to teleport. At some point soon thereafter, Snapper Carr is reunited with Brainiac 2 on the planet Cairn, where Brainiac gives him new hands, but Snapper still cannot teleport.

=== Encountering the Hourman android ===
The character of Snapper Carr is a main character in the Hourman comic book, which was published from April 1999 to April 2001. Throughout the comic book's run, a running gag depicts Snapper wearing a series of T-shirts, each emblazoned with a different superhero's logo or uniform colors. In this comic book, Hourman is an android from the 853rd century. He was built by Tyler ChemoRobotics, a company founded by Hourman (Rick Tyler) in the late 20th century. The Hourman android traveled permanently to the 20th century, which is the one place he believed he could grow and evolve as a lifeform. He joined the Justice League, and at one point accessed all of Batman's memories of the League. These memories made the Hourman android realize that Snapper Carr would be a good "humanity coach". The reader learns that, after having his hands restored, Snapper returned to Earth. He married and was divorced by a young woman named Bethany Lee (whose mother is the Happy Harbor chief of police). Snapper is depicted spending most of his time at a trendy if run-down Happy Harbor coffeehouse, the Mad Yak Café, and caring for his pet cat, whom he has named Starro. (Note: "The Mad Yak" is a poem by Beat poet Gregory Corso. Snapper Carr was originally depicted as a "beatnik". The poem, written from the perspective of a cow going to slaughter, discusses feelings of being used for raw materials rather than being treated like an individual. Snapper's feelings in Hourman reflect those expressed in the poem.)

Throughout the run of Hourman, Snapper is subjected to a wide range of horrors and bad experiences. Snapper is turned into an android by Amazo after Amazo gains the ability to not just capture a person's super-powers but their humanity as well. Starro is injured, and Hourman reverses the "humanization" effect. In a tie-in to "Day of Judgment", Snapper fantasizes about two alternative futures—one in which he never betrays the Justice League and becomes a super-hero, and one in which he betrays them and becomes a washed-up alcoholic. Snapper is able to deduce that demons are harassing him and his friends, causing these fantasies, and he not only gets rid of the demons but convinces one of them to reject evil and become good by (feeding it cheesecake). Shortly thereafter, Snapper Carr and his friends are accidentally trapped aboard Hourman's timeship for months, nearly going insane. After being freed, Snapper is kidnapped by demons and tortured for several days, but is freed by Hourman. Snapper is shown suffering from severe depression after this experience. Hourman asks Snapper to tell him about his time with the Justice League, and in flashback Snapper relates the events of Justice League of America #77. The reader learns that Snapper regrets quitting the Justice League, and that Bethany divorced him because Snapper felt he was not good enough for her. Hourman says that Snapper fights for the common man, and that's what people like about him. This lifts Snapper out of his depression. (Note: This issue of Hourman breaks the fourth wall: In reviewing Snapper's journal entries about his time with the JLA, Hourman sees that Snapper has given each entry a title, such as "Doom of the Star Diamond" and "Snapper Carr—Super Traitor!". These are the titles of the stories in Justice League of America Vol. 1 #4 and Justice League of America #77. This creates a meta-story, in which Snapper's newspaper reports about the JLA's exploits become the titles of stories published by DC Comics. They also serve as an in-joke, depicting Snapper's own feelings of (first) innocent bravado and melodrama and (second) deep self-loathing.) Amazo returns and appears to kill Snapper Carr. Snapper is not dead but back in time, caught in a loop where he is forced to relive the loss of his hands over and over. Hourman merges his body with Amazo's, and is able to retrieve Snapper from the time-loop. Realizing he has learned as much about being human as he can, Hourman decides to return to the 853rd century.

=== Helping Young Justice ===
The character of Snapper Carr has a major recurring role in the comic book Young Justice, a group consisting of teenagers and young adults. Initially, the group is mentored by Red Tornado, but in Young Justice #38, Impulse (Bart Allen) decides to leave the group to live a life away from super-heroics. Robin (Tim Drake) resigns, too, feeling no one trusts him. Wonder Girl (Cassie Sandsmark) asks Red Tornado for help, and he persuades Snapper Carr to provide daily oversight of the group. Snapper Carr appears irregularly over the remaining publication history of Young Justice.

During and after Snapper Carr's run in Young Justice, the character appeared in cameos three times in other comic books. The first appearance was when he attended Green Arrow's funeral. The second appearance showed him hanging out with the Justice League during a meeting with the Avengers from Marvel Comics. The third appearance was when he attended Green Arrow's wedding to Black Canary. In this last outing, Snapper's invitation to the wedding is stolen and restolen by a host of villains, but Snapper manages to attend the event all the same. (Note: A clue to Snapper Carr's intelligence is given in this comic one-off. Previously, Green Arrow was shown to be sympathetic to Snapper, and advised him to forgive himself for betraying the Justice League. Now, Green Arrow is shown to consider Snapper to be an idiot. His statement, he tells Black Canary, is not meant as a cruel put-down but as an honest assessment of Snapper's intelligence.)

=== Working for Checkmate ===
DC Comics rebooted their comic universe in 1985 and 1986 in the crossover event Crisis on Infinite Earths, again in Zero Hour: Crisis in Time in 1994, then in Infinite Crisis in 2005 and 2006, in Final Crisis in 2008, in Flashpoint and "The New 52" in 2011. The initial reboot was intended to resolve continuity problems which had crept into the DC Comics universe over the past 50 years, and the subsequent reboots were to correct problems created by Crisis on Infinite Earths. (Note: Flashpoint and "The New 52" have been called a "soft reboots", because most of the changes wrought were minor in nature. The purpose of Flashpoint and "The New 52" were to allow DC Comics writers to ignore the continuity of the past 60 years, if they chose, in order to make each superhero and their stories more accessible to new readers.)

During the build-up to Infinite Crisis, DC Comics published a limited series titled Identity Crisis. Batman is surprised to discover that many supervillains have gained access to the JLA Satellite, the Justice League Watchtower (a base on the moon), and (after the Watchtower's destruction) the new JLA Satellite. Worse, many villains have learned the secret identity of a wide range of heroes. Zatanna, a sorceress and Justice League member, has (with the consent of nearly all members of the League) been wiping the memories of these villains. Batman, who opposed this decision, also had his memories wiped. It is revealed that Batman designed and constructed an artificial intelligence and placed it aboard a satellite called Brother MK I, nicknamed "Brother Eye". The purpose of Brother Eye is to keep track of superhero activities in case Batman's memories are wiped again. The hero-turned-villain Alexander Luthor Jr. gives the satellite sentience (Note: Luthor's involvement was not fully revealed until Infinite Crisis #4 (March 2006).) and Maxwell Lord, leader of the government agency Checkmate, (Note: Maxwell Lord was a corporate executive who became the "manager" of the Justice League in 1987, and transformed it into the Justice League International. The Countdown to Infinite Crisis one-shot established that Lord hated superheroes, had done his best to render the Justice League International as ineffective as possible, and was using Checkmate to further his goal of wiping out the world's superheroes.) takes control of it. (Note: In the fictional chronology of the world in DC Comics, the Justice Society of America disbands in 1951. President Harry S. Truman then forms Task Force X, a group of supervillains (on parole) and superheroes (with questionable moral codes) who act on behalf of the United States government. Task Force X (more colloquially known as the Suicide Squad) generally operated internationally. A domestic arm, known as Argent, operated domestically. In 1986, "The Agency" was formed as a small, quasi-independent unit within Task Force X to deal with terrorist organizations. The Agency was reorganized as Checkmate in 1988. In 2006, Checkmate was turned over to a fictional version of the United Nations Security Council, and continues to operate under that body's jurisdiction.) Lord secretly alters millions of people around the globe with Checkmate technology, turning them into "Observational Metahuman Activity Constructs" (OMACs)—superpowered creatures which will do Lord's bidding. Brother Eye frames Wonder Woman for Lord's death (Note: Various DC Comics publications establish that the Dominators' "gene bomb" had caused Lord's latent metagene to also express, giving him mind-control superpowers. He took permanent control of Superman, turning him wild with the fear that his loved ones were being constantly threatened. When Wonder Woman captured Lord in Wonder Woman #219 and used her Lasso of Truth on him, Lord admitted that the only way to free Superman was to kill Lord himself. Wonder Woman did so. Brother Eye edited the footage to make it appear as if Wonder Woman killed Lord for no reason whatsoever.) and then unleashes a quarter million OMACs against the world's heroes. Brother Eye is eventually defeated, although hundreds of thousands of people still have OMAC technology within their bodies.

The storyline 52 included several one-off and limited series comic books. One of these limited series was the six-part comic book 52: Aftermath. 52 had established the existence of the Science Squad, a group of supervillain mad scientists based in the nation of Oolong Island (which is ruled by evil superscientist Veronica Cale). The Science Squad unleashes the Four Horsemen of Apokolips—Yurrd (famine), (Note: Yurrd was created by Doctor Sivana, and was the first of the Four Horseman to appear. He infiltrated the Black Marvel Family by pretending to be a timid, mutated crocodile.) Rogga (war), Zorrm (pestilence), and Azraeuz (death). These bioengineered beings (Note: According to the story, the existence of the Four Horsemen was prophesied in an occult reference work known as the "Crime Bible", where they were said to be associated with the evil being Darkseid of the New Gods and living on his planet, Apokolips.) were created specifically to attack the Black Marvel Family, rulers of the Middle Eastern nation of Kahndaq. Black Adam's lover, the superheroine Isis, dies after being infected by Zorrm, and Yurrd eats her brother, Osiris. Black Adam goes mad with rage and grief and murders every person in Bialya (where he believes the Four Horsemen originated). After being briefly imprisoned by the Science Squad, Black Adam is freed by his friend Atom Smasher and kills hundreds of thousands of people in Italy and China. Black Adam is finally stopped by Captain Marvel.

The Four Horsemen return in a new limited series comic book, 52 Aftermath: The Four Horsemen, which began publication in November 2007 (six months after the events of 52 and World War III). In this story, the spirits of the bioengineered beings survived their destruction by Black Adam and flee to Bialya, where millions of bodies lay unburied. Veronica Cale (hoping to regain control of the beings) secretly gives them "morphogenetic technology" to make their bodies more adaptable to Earth and less capable of being destroyed. Superman, Batman, and Wonder Woman arrive in Bialya in time to see the Four Horsemen constructing new bodies from the millions of corpses lying around them. Snapper Carr appears at the end of the second issue, where he is shown monitoring the three heroes for Checkmate. Snapper reveals himself to the heroes in the third issue, and explains that he not only joined Checkmate during the OMAC crisis but has been secretly monitoring the Justice League's activities since the dissolution of Young Justice. Superman is angered by this and demands an end to Snapper's spying, but Batman argues that Snapper can help in case the battle against the Four Horsemen does not go well. Superman rescues Batman and Snapper from an advancing army of zombies resurrected by Azraeuz. Superman is infected by Zorrm, and Batman voices concern for him. Snapper Carr blithely tells him that "Clark can take care of himself", and Batman slaps him for pretending an over-friendly familiarity with a hero he barely knows. (Note: Batman implies that he has not forgiven Snapper for betraying the JLA to the Joker, and that his work for Checkmate is yet another betrayal. Even though Snapper knows the secret identities of many members of the Justice League, Batman implies that Snapper no longer has the moral right to use to their real names.) In the fourth issue of the limited series, Mister Terrific, one of the four heads of Checkmate, arrives on Oolong Island. He teleports Snapper, Superman, and Batman out of Bialya and to Oolong Island, where he tells the heroes that the Science Squad is alarmed that the Four Horsemen remain out of their control. The villains, he says, are now attempting to build a device to contain them, and Checkmate is assisting that effort. Snapper is present when Batman, Superman, and Wonder Woman defeat the Four Horsemen, and is left behind on the island by the heroes when they leave.

=== Final Crisis: Resist ===
The Final Crisis storyline begins with Darkseid's death, and his spirit and the spirit of all the Apokoliptian New Gods falling to Earth. This creates a quantum singularity that will consume all creation. The supervillain Libra seizes control of a large number of nations and organizations on Earth on behalf of Darkseid. Darkseid obtains a new body, and releases the Anti-Life Equation, a metaphysical virus which allows Darkseid to control the mind of anyone it infects. After a month, nearly all the people of Earth are under Darkseid's control. So are most superheroes and supervillains, whom Darkseid organizes into a terrorist unit called the Justifiers. (Note: The Justifiers first appeared in the Forever People comic book in 1971. The New God character Glorious Godfrey, a minion of Darkseid, does not believe a solution can be found that will activate the Anti-Life Equation. Instead, he calls for "manufactured Anti-Life" by means of indoctrination, torture, propaganda, enslavement, and giving in to emotion. The Justifiers are his indoctrinated, mindless shock troops who wear anonymizing blank-faced steel helmets and put Darkseid's plans into motion.) Darkseid is eventually defeated, and the universe rebooted by Superman using the Miracle Machine.

The one-off publication Final Crisis: Resist features Snapper Carr. It begins the same day the Anti-Life Equation is released, and the events in the story take place over the next few days. In the book's opening pages, Snapper is shown to be at Checkmate's headquarters in Antarctica. While nearly all Checkmate staff, heroes, and villains are infected with Anti-Life, a few barricade themselves inside the compound, which is protected by force fields. Snapper, whose teleportation abilities have now remanifested (how is not explained in the story), spends the first few days after the release of Anti-Life teleporting around the globe disrupting Darkseid's hold on various scientific organizations. But supplies are almost nonexistent at the Checkmate base. After several days, Snapper teleports to France to seek food for the Checkmate hold-outs. He is attacked by the Anti-Life-infected hero Firehawk, but the supervillain Cheetah knocks Firehawk unconscious. A few days later, Snapper teleports to a hospital in the United States to find medical supplies. He is sickened to see children being infected with Anti-Life. He discovers Cheetah in an empty medical ward of the hospital, bandaging an injury. Cheetah reacts to Snapper's presence by seducing him, and they end up having sex. (Note: In the retconned backstory, Barbara Ann Minerva is an archeologist who ingests berries and leaves of the plant god, Urzkartaga. This transforms her into a cheetah-like feline humanoid with super-speed and super-strength (among other powers), but also leaves her with an insatiable sex drive and bloodlust.) Cheetah tells Snapper she is impressed by his physical endowment and love-making skills. Their post-coital interlude is interrupted by the Justifier Gorilla Grodd. Snapper teleports himself and Cheetah to Checkmate headquarters, but the strain of teleporting another person (which he is doing for the first time) burns out his teleportation power. Mister Terrific activates OMACs worldwide to help defeat Darkseid, with Snapper leading a group of OMACs, Mister Terrific, Cheetah, and the remaining Checkmate staff in a charge out of the bunker.

=== Battle against Epoch ===
The next appearance of the Snapper Carr character occurred in 2009 in Justice League of America 80-Page Giant.

In this story, Snapper Carr is biding his time at the Secret Sanctuary in Happy Harbor, and summons Cheetah for some romance and perhaps sex. (Note: Snapper reveals in the story that he knows Cheetah's real name, Barbara, and that he's been using the JLA computers to track her. The implication is that not only has the Justice League permitted its technology to remain at the Secret Sanctuary, but also that it allows Snapper to use it—indicating a healing of the breach between the League and Snapper. Additionally, League trophies remain on display at the Secret Sanctuary, another indication that the League is still using the site.) Their tryst is interrupted by the appearance of the supervillain Time Commander (who had recently battled Hourman). Time Commander claims that his grandmother is about to be born today, and that the supervillain Epoch (formerly known as the Lord of Time, and an old JLA enemy) wants to kill the infant so that Time Commander will never be born. Epoch, he says, is already in the hospital and searching for the child. Furthermore, Epoch is also trying to kill the Justice League by attacking them when they were children. Time Commander has already scattered the JLA through time in an attempt to stop Epoch from carrying out his plans (if the Justice League never survives infancy, they will not form the League and Snapper Carr will not be around to help Time Commander). Most of the issue follows the adventures of six teams, composed of one or more League members, as they try to stop Epoch at various points in the past. At the end of the issue, Snapper persuades Cheetah to help by distracting Epoch so Snapper can teleport into the hospital, grab Epoch, and then teleport himself and Epoch back outside. Having done so, Snapper then grabs Epoch's "time gauntlet" and teleports to the side of the Time Commander—with Epoch's forearm and hand in his grasp (the re-emergence of Snapper's teleportation powers is not explained in the story). With Epoch's technology (and limb) stolen, the attack in the past ceases. The JLA reappear and quickly subdue Epoch. Cheetah, Snapper, and Time Commander bid goodbye to the newborn grandmother in the hospital, and Time Commander takes Epoch to the Timepoint (a frozen moment in time that serves as a prison). In the story's final panels, Cheetah reveals that the baby is not Time Commander's grandmother. Snapper realizes he has been duped: The Time Commander merely wanted to distract Snapper so that he could steal Hourman's time machine.

=== DC Rebirth ===
In 2016, DC Comics implemented a relaunch of its books called "DC Rebirth" which restored its continuity to a form much as it was prior to "The New 52". Snapper Carr makes an appearance in the 2019 run of Dial H for Hero. The H-Dial (which can turn a person into a wide range of super-powered beings) is found by Miguel Montez. The H-Dial proves to be addictive, so that anyone who has used it in the past now craves to possess and use it. The mysterious villain Mister Thunderbolt is one of these seeking the device. Snapper was seen reacting to the H-Dials's re-emergence. Miguel and his friend Summer Pickens arrive at the Justice League's Detroit headquarters and meet Snapper Carr, who is managing robotic doubles of the Justice League. (Note: The robotic doubles were created by Professor Ivo in 1987 to attack the Justice League.) As Snapper Carr tries to contact the Hall of Justice, Mister Thunderbolt programs the robots to attack Miguel, Summer, and Snapper. Using the H-Dial, Summer transforms into Chimp Change, Snapper turns into Alien Ice Cream Man, and Miguel turns into Lil' Miguelito. As Chimp Change and Alien Ice Cream Man subdue the robots, Mister Thunderbolt tricks Miguel into dialing "S" for Sockamagee. This releases Mister Thunderbolt from his prison. Summer and Snapper return to normal. Mister Thunderbolt disappears into a dimensional portal, and Miguel follows him. With Snapper still unable to contact the Hall of Justice, Summer borrows the Supermobile and flies to Metropolis to find Superman.

== Powers and abilities ==
Snapper Carr is an expert at computer hacking, computer operating, demolitions, electrical engineering, espionage, and surveillance.

Experimentation from the Dominators gave Snapper Carr the ability to teleport by snapping his fingers. Though he lost this ability when the Khunds chopped off his hands, it returned to him while he was working for Checkmate.

== Other versions ==
=== Earth 3 ===
An alternate universe version of Snapper Carr from Earth-Three appears in Young Justice (vol. 3) as a member of the Crime Syndicate of America.

=== JLA: The Island of Doctor Moreau ===
An alternate universe version of Snapper Carr appears in Elseworlds one-shot JLA: The Island of Dr. Moreau.

=== Son of Superman ===
An alternate universe version of Snapper Carr appears in Son of Superman.

== In other media ==
=== Television ===
- Snapper Carr appears in Justice League, voiced by Jason Marsden. This version is a television reporter.
- Snapper Carr appears in Young Justice, voiced by Greg Weisman. This version is a history teacher at Happy Harbor High School who later becomes its principal and adopts Harper and Cullen Row.
- Snapper Carr appears in Supergirl, portrayed by Ian Gomez. This version is the editor-in-chief of CatCo Magazine.

=== Film ===
An illusory version of Snapper Carr appears in Justice League: Warworld.

=== Video games ===
- Snapper Carr appears as a character summon in Scribblenauts Unmasked: A DC Comics Adventure.
- Snapper Carr appears in Justice League: Cosmic Chaos. This version is the mayor of Happy Harbor.

=== Miscellaneous ===
Snapper Carr appears in the Young Justice tie-in comic.

== Bibliography ==
- Beatty, Scott (2008). "Checkmate". In Dougall, Alastair (ed.). The DC Comics Encyclopedia. New York: Dorling Kindesley. ISBN 9781405328913.
- Coletta, Charles (2014). "Joker". In Booker, M. Keith (ed.). Comics Through Time: A History of Icons, Idols, and Ideas. Santa Barbara, Calif.: Greenwood Press. ISBN 9780313397516.
- Cowsill, Alan (2010). DC Comics Year By Year: A Visual Chronicle. New York: DK Publishing. ISBN 9780756667429.
- Eury, Michael (2005). The Justice League Companion: A Historical and Speculative Overview of the Silver Age Justice League of America. Raleigh, N.C.: TwoMorrows. ISBN 9781893905481.
- Fawaz, Ramzi (2016). The New Mutants: Superheroes and the Radical Imagination of American Comics. New York: New York University Press. ISBN 9781479814336.
- Greenberger, Robert (2008). "Carr, Snapper". In Dougall, Alastair (ed.). The DC Comics Encyclopedia. New York: Dorling Kindersley. ISBN 9781405328913.
- Greenberger, Robert (2008). "Cheetah II". In Dougall, Alastair (ed.). The DC Comics Encyclopedia. New York: Dorling Kindersley. ISBN 9781405328913.
- Greenberger, Robert (2008). The Essential Batman Encyclopedia. New York: Del Rey/Ballantine Books. ISBN 9780345501066.
- Harmon, Jim; Glut, Donald F (1972). The Great Movie Serials: Their Sound and Fury. Garden City, N.Y.: Doubleday. ISBN 9780385090797.
- Jimenez, Phil; Wells, John (2010). The Essential Wonder Woman Encyclopedia: The Ultimate Guide to the Amazon Princess. New York: Del Rey/Ballantine Books. ISBN 9780345501073.
- Morrow, John; Kirby, Jack (2004). The Collected Jack Kirby Collector. Vol. 4. Raleigh, N.C.: TwoMorrows. ISBN 9781893905009.
- Oropeza, Brisio J. (2005). The Gospel According to Superheroes: Religion and Popular Culture. New York: Lang. ISBN 9780820474229.
- Pitts, Michael R. (2010). Columbia Pictures: Horror, Science Fiction and Fantasy Films, 1928-1982. Jefferson, N.C.: McFarland Publishing. ISBN 9780786444472.
- Romagnoli, Alex S.; Pagnucci, Gian S. (2013). Enter the Superheroes: American Values, Culture, and the Canon of Superhero Literature. Lanham, Md.: The Scarecrow Press. ISBN 9780810891715.
- Serchay, David S. (2010). "Justice League of America". In Booker, M. Keith (ed.). Encyclopedia of Comic Books and Graphic Novels. Santa Barbara, Calif.: Greenwood Press. ISBN 9780313357466.
- Rose, Tony (2014). "Cold War". In Booker, M. Keith (ed.). Comics Through Time: A History of Icons, Idols, and Ideas. Santa Barbara, Calif.: Greenwood Press. ISBN 9780313397516.
- Shutt, Craig (2003). Baby Boomer Comics: The Wild, Wacky, Wonderful Comic Books of the 1960s!. Iola, Wisc.: Krause Publications. ISBN 9781440225130.
- Tondro, Jason (2011). Superheroes of the Round Table: Comics Connections to Medieval and Renaissance Literature. Jefferson, N.C.: McFarland Publishing. ISBN 9780786488766.
- Voger, Mark (2006). The Dark Age: Grim, Great and Gimmicky Post-Modern Comics. Raleigh, N.C.: TwoMorrows. ISBN 9781893905535.
- Wallace, Dan (2008). "Blasters". In Dougall, Alastair (ed.). The DC Comics Encyclopedia. New York: Dorling Kindersley. ISBN 9781405328913.
- Weaver, Weaver (2012). Comics for Film, Games, and Animation: Using Comics to Construct Your Transmedia World Story. Burlington, Mass.: Focal Press. ISBN 9780240823782.
- Wells, John (2014). American Comic Book Chronicles: The 1960s, 1965-1969. Raleigh, N.C.: TwoMorrows. ISBN 9781605490557.
- York, Rafael (2014). "Crisis on Infinite Earths". In Booker, M. Keith (ed.). Comics Through Time: A History of Icons, Idols, and Ideas. Santa Barbara, Calif.: Greenwood Press. ISBN 9780313397516.
