= Glynis Oliver =

Comics artist

- Born: Glynis Oliver; October 26, 1949 (age 77)
- Area: Colourist
- Pseudonym: Glynis Wein
- Spouse: Len Wein (divorced)

Glynis Oliver, also credited as Glynis Wein (/wiːn/), is an artist who has worked as a colorist in the comics industry. For several years, she was married to Len Wein. She returned to her maiden name in 1985.

== Work ==
In the fall of 1972, Len Wein and writers Gerry Conway and Steve Englehart crafted a metafictional unofficial crossover spanning titles from both major comics companies. Each comic featured Englehart, Conway, and Len Wein, as well as Glynis Wein, interacting with Marvel or DC characters at the Rutland Halloween Parade in Rutland, Vermont. Beginning in Amazing Adventures #16 (by Englehart with art by Bob Brown and Frank McLaughlin), the story continued in Justice League of America #103 (by Len Wein, Dick Dillin and Dick Giordano), and concluded in Thor #207 (by Conway and penciler John Buscema).

== Awards ==
She has been recognized for her work in the industry with a Shazam Award for Best Colorist in 1973.

== Bibliography ==
Comics work includes (incomplete):

- 2001: A Space Odyssey #4–5
- Adventure Comics #457–459, 467–471, 473
- Amazing Adventures #16, 17, 20
- Amazing Adventures Vol. 2 #1
- The Amazing Spider-Man #127, 151–182, 184, 198, 200, 223–225, 228–230, 233, 235, 239, 241, 252–253, 255, Annual 13, Giant-Size 1–2
- Astonishing Tales #1
- Avengers #110, 119, 155
- Batman #308, 313–315, 317–319, 321–322
- Battlestar Galactica #5, 23
- Fantastic Four #137, 154–155, 161, 184–188, 190–192, 196, 203, 205, 208–209, 232–233, 236–237, 239–244, 246–248, 251–263, 265–306, 308–309, 316
- G.I. Joe #1
- The Incredible Hulk (1962) #354-401, 403–432, 434-453
- Magik (Illyana and Storm) #1–3
- New Mutants #1–5, 7–11, 13–15, 17–34, 37–39, 41, 43, 45–51, 53–60, 62, 64–73, 75–78, 80, 82–86, 88, 90
- New Mutants Annual #2–4
- Nova #9, 12, 25
- Phoenix (1984) #1
- Power Man (1974) #17–19, 31, 62
- Power Pack #1–10
- Prince Namor, The Submariner #1–2
- Rom #2, 16, 62
- Sabre #1
- Spectacular Spider-Man #3, 45, 47, 60, 69–70, 84, 89, 91, 94
- Spider-Man Megazine #1, 3
- Spider-Woman #1, 7, 24–25
- Star Wars #5, 28, 39, 41–44, 46–47, 53–54, 56, 61, 64–70, 75–86, 89, 91–92
- Star-Lord Special #1
- Strange Tales #169–174, 179
- Submariner #60, 63–64, 69
- Superboy #247
- Superman #336–344
- Supernatural Thrillers #8, 10
- Thor #208–210, 213, 219–220, 225, 242–248, 250–253, 255–271, 277–279, 284, 286, 288, 291, Annual 6–7
- Tomb of Dracula #8–9, 19–20, 57
- Uncanny X-Men #113–114, 116–133, 136–148, 150, 153, 155, 157–163, 166–168, 171–204, 206–235, 237–253, 255–260, 262–263, 267–272, 275, 279, 294, 300, Annual 3–8, 11–12, 17
- Untold Legend of the Batman #1–3
- Werewolf By Night #5–8
- What If? #2, 13, 18, 28, 32–33, 35
- Wolverine (1982) #1–6, 12–13, 15–18
- Worlds Unknown #4, 7
