= Steve Mattsson =

American comic book artist and writer (born 1959)

- Born: December 16, 1959 (age 66) Salt Lake City, Utah
- Areas: Writer, Editor, Colourist
- Notable works: Boris the Bear, Green Lantern, Night Thrasher, Superboy, Superboy and the Ravers, Black Panther, and Untold Tales of Spider-Man

Steve Mattsson (born December 16, 1959) is an American comic book writer and colorist.

His career began in the mid-1980s, with contributions to Dark Horse Comics's project Boris the Bear.

He also served as co-creator, co-writer, and writer of DC's Superboy and the Ravers.
