= Sparx (character) =

- Sparx as depicted in Superboy and the Ravers #1 (September 1996). Art by Paul Pelletier (penciler), Dan Davis (inker), John Kalisz (colorist), and Kevin Cunningham (letterer).

Publication information
- Publisher: DC Comics
- First appearance: The Adventures of Superman Annual #5 (1993)
- Created by: Karl Kesel (writer); Tom Grummett (artist); Ed Hannigan (artist)

In-story information
- Alter ego: Donna Carol Force
- Team affiliations: The Ravers; Blood Pack; Force Family
- Notable aliases: D.C. Force
- Abilities: Electrical form and projection, flight

Sparx (Donna Force) is a superheroine published by DC Comics. She first appeared in The Adventures of Superman Annual #5 (1993) and was created by Karl Kesel, Tom Grummett and Ed Hannigan.

== Fictional character biography ==
Donna Carol Force, nicknamed D.C., is part of the metahuman superhero team of Canada, known as the "Force Family". With her metagene not having been activated, D.C. travels to Metropolis and allows herself to be bitten by alien parasites, hoping to gain superpowers. This plan succeeds, activating her metagene and giving her electric superpowers. Some time later, D.C. assumes the name Sparx and auditions for the Blood Pack, a team of fellow metahumans whose powers were activated by the aliens. The team only lasts a short while before disbanding.

Sparx later loses her powers while battling the Predators, a race of emotion-influencing beings. Despite her loss of power, Sparx appears in Superman/Batman #32 (2007), powered up and under the control of Despero. Sparx also makes minor appearances in Infinite Crisis and Final Crisis.

== In other media ==
Sparx appears as a character summon in Scribblenauts Unmasked: A DC Comics Adventure.
