= David Graves (character) =

- Graves as depicted in Justice League volume 2 #9 (July 2012). Art by Jim Lee (penciller), Scott Williams (inker), and Alex Sinclair (colorist).

Publication information
- Publisher: DC Comics
- First appearance: Justice League (vol. 2) #6 (April 2012)
- Created by: Geoff Johns; Jim Lee

In-story information
- Alter ego: David Graves
- Team affiliations: Asuras
- Notable aliases: Graves
- Abilities: Uses spirits to feed off people's misery

David Graves is a DC Comics supervillain and an enemy of the Justice League. He was created by Geoff Johns and Jim Lee, and first appeared in Justice League (vol. 2) #6 (April 2012) during "The New 52".

== Creation ==
David Graves was created by Justice League writer Geoff Johns and artist Jim Lee. Johns described Graves as inverting the "hero's journey" narrative device, illustrating how a villain would go through a twisted version of it and become a major threat for the Justice League.

== Fictional character biography ==
David Graves was a historian and published author, interested in fringe history. He wrote a series of books, on subjects such as Atlantis, the miracles of Fatima, the Nazca lines, and how they could affect the modern world. Shortly after the Justice League was established, Graves, his wife Jennifer, and their two children Jason and Emma are attacked by Darkseid's forces, but are saved by the Justice League. Believing that the superheroes were a modern incarnation of the gods of antiquity, Graves set out to research a book about the heroes. It became his most popular title, "Justice League: Gods Among Men".

Within a year of the formation of the Justice League, Graves developed an unspecified malady which left him using a wheelchair and unlikely to last another year. Faced with the knowledge that his family was gone and the heroes were not going to save him, Graves snaps, shoots his doctor, and vanished. Four years later, Graves returns completely unrecognizable from his former self, with the faces of his children on his arm. Vowing to destroy the Justice League for their hubris, Graves breaks into the Black Room, a secret facility where A.R.G.U.S. stores mystical items.

Graves determines that the best way to destroy the Justice League would be through their public liaison Steve Trevor. Graves interrogates Key, Weapons Master, Scarecrow, Cheetah, Captain Cold and Scavenger to discover the weaknesses of each Justice League member. He then kidnaps Steve Trevor and tortures him, threatening to kill his family.

== Powers and abilities ==
Graves is able to use spirits to feed off people's misery, an ability derived from the Asura gods. He was able to take on most of the Justice League by using their inner fears against them.
