= David Graves (bishop) =

United Methodist bishop

Bishop David Graves
- Born: 1958 (age 67–68); Knoxville, Tennessee
- Occupation: Bishop
- Spouse: Nancy Graves
- Children: Casey and Gregg

David W. Graves (born 1958) is an American clergyman in the United Methodist Church who is bishop of the Tennessee-Western Kentucky Annual Conference, Kentucky Annual Conference, and the Central Appalachian Missionary Conference. He was elected July 13, 2016 to the episcopacy at the Southeastern Jurisdictional Conference quadrennial meeting at Lake Junaluska, N.C. He served as resident bishop of the Alabama-West Florida Conference from 2016, and the South Georgia Conference from 2021. He became resident bishop of the Tennessee-Western Kentucky Annual, Kentucky Annual, and Central Appalachian Missionary Conferences on September 1, 2024.

== Dismissal of complaint against Jeff Sessions ==
On June 18, 2018, over 600 members of the United Methodist Church issued a formal complaint to the church, accusing fellow member Jeff Sessions of racial discrimination, child abuse, and spreading "doctrines contrary to the standards of doctrine of the United Methodist Church." As attorney general in the Trump administration, Sessions was overseeing the administration's policy of family separation at the border. Sessions had defended this policy and used the Bible to justify his actions, which the complaint argued was both contrary to the values espoused by the UMC and against the church's Book of Discipline. On June 14, Sessions had cited Romans 13, which reminds readers that Christians should also follow secular law, to justify his actions and the administration's policy. Many biblical scholars and fellow Methodists harshly criticized Sessions for his interpretation of the text, with one scholar calling it cherry picking because Sessions at the same time ignored Bible passages that called for people to defend children. The family separation policy has faced bipartisan criticism in Congress, and the Trump administration received a federal court order to reunite children separated from their parents.

Rev. Debora Bishop, who is district superintendent of the church's Alabama-West Florida Conference (in which Sessions' home church is located), dismissed the complaint on July 30, writing that a government official's actions in their official capacity are separate from their actions as a private person. The Conference's resident bishop David Graves agreed with Rev. Bishop's opinion, arguing that "political action is not personal conduct when the political officer is carrying out official policy". He also said that because Sessions is a layperson his actions aren't "covered by the chargeable offense provisions of The Book of Discipline."

Seemingly against his earlier decision on Sessions, Graves and many other United Methodist bishops has issued statements calling for the reunification of families.

== Education ==
- Bachelor of Science in Business Administration, University of Tennessee, Knoxville, TN
- Master of Divinity, Candler School of Theology, Emory University, Atlanta, GA

== Personal life ==
Graves is married to Nancy Graves. Together they have two children.

== Awards ==
Clergy Denman Award, 2013

Holston Denman Evangelism Award, 2013

== Ordained ministry ==
- Fountain City UMC | Knoxville, Tenn.
- Second UMC | Knoxville, Tenn.
- Hixson UMC | Chattanooga, Tenn.
- Pastor, St. Matthew and Mountainview UMC | Kingsport, Tenn.
- Senior Pastor, Ooltewah UMC | Ooltewah, Tenn.
- District Superintendent, Kingsport District | Kingsport, Tenn.
- Senior Pastor, Church Street UMC | Knoxville, Tenn.

== Links ==
- http://www.davidwgraves.com/
