= Boris the Bear =

American comic character

- Publisher: Dark Horse Comics

Creative team
- Creators: James Dean Smith; Mike Richardson

Original publication
- Date of publication: 1986–1991 (original run) 2007 (revival)
- Language: English

Boris the Bear is a fictional comic book character featured in several comic book titles published between 1986 and 2008. The series began as a response to the popularity of the wave of anthropomorphic animal titles that began with the publishing of Teenage Mutant Ninja Turtles in 1984. That title, itself a parody of popular comic books at the time such as Daredevil, inspired numerous knock-offs and parodies like Adolescent Radioactive Black Belt Hamsters, Pre-Teen Dirty-Gene Kung-Fu Kangaroos, Mildy Microwaved Pre-Pubescent Kung Fu Gophers and Geriatric Gangrene Jujitsu Gerbils which led to what many refer to as the Black-and-White Boom of the mid-1980s. The Boris character started as bear who was tired of these comic books and decides to kill them in a hyper-violent style reminiscent of 1980s films such as Rambo. After the first issue, Boris the Bear continued to fight parodies of the Transformers, Marvel Comics, Swamp Thing, and Elfquest before moving on to more character-driven stories.

== Publication history ==
Starting in July 1986 and created by James Dean Smith and written by Mike Richardson and Randy Stradley, Boris the Bear was the second title published by Dark Horse Comics. Telling the story of an anthropomorphic bear, who is soon revealed to be a robot, the book parodied many other comic book characters while also satirizing the comic book industry as a whole. Often extremely violent, the book was a black comedy that developed a cult following. The title also served as the introduction to Wacky Squirrel, created by Mike Richardson and Jim Bradrick, who gained his own popularity and went on to star in his own series and specials published by Dark Horse.

Early issues of Boris the Bear centered on parodies of industry trends at the time. For example, the first issue, titled Boris the Bear Slaughters the Teenage Radioactive Black Belt Mutant Ninja Critters, features Boris disposing of characters resembling the Teenage Mutant Ninja Turtles, Usagi Yojimbo, Cerebus the Aardvark, the Adolescent Radioactive Black Belt Hamsters, Hamster Vice, and others in an extremely violent matter. The trend continued through the early issues of the title with Boris confronting or parodying characters resembling the Transformers, the heroes of the Marvel Universe, Swamp Thing, Batman, and Elfquest. It was not long before Boris even met the actual T.H.U.N.D.E.R. Agents.

The popularity of Boris led to two early appearances in the third and fourth issues of the first volume of Dark Horse Presents as well as full color reprints of the first three issues of his own book under the title Boris the Bear Instant Color Classics. The character's popularity also led to parodies of Boris himself and “revenge” stories appearing in titles such as Blackthorne Publishing’s Laffin’ Gas, Slave Labor Graphics' Samurai Penguin and Eclipse Comics’ Adolescent Radioactive Black Belt Hamsters.

In 1987, a disagreement with Dark Horse, over the direction of the title, convinced Smith to take Boris back from Dark Horse after the twelfth issue and begin self-publishing the book under his own Nicotat Comics banner. The book picked up with the thirteenth issue, one month after the departure from Dark Horse. Nine months later, Nicotat introduced what was intended to be an ongoing second title, Boris’ Adventure Magazine. The original Boris continued to parody other comic books, although in a less vicious way, while also maturing into more of a somewhat serious adventure title. As the title changed and the book began shipping more and more infrequently, readership dropped and sales decreased. Eventually, despite Smith having the title plotted through the fortieth issue, Nicotat ended its run with the thirty-fourth issue in November, 1991.

In 1992, Boris briefly returned to Dark Horse with a short story in the sixty-fourth issue of Dark Horse Presents.

In July, 1996, Nicotat returned to the Boris character with a second issue of Boris’ Adventure Magazine. The title ran bi-monthly for two more issues, through November, 1996. Solicitations for the fifth and sixth issues were sent to retailers but the actual issues were never published. The book was officially canceled in 1997.

James Dean Smith began self-publishing again under the name Oasis Comics, testing the waters with small digital print runs. Smith handled writing, art, lettering, editing, and production chores on a brand new Boris the Bear titles. He published Boris the Bear #1 in April 2007. Boris The Bear: A Fall Into Spring Special followed in May 2008. That same year, Smith announced that he was working on a Boris the Bear online comic strip, as well as a new one-shot comic book titled Boris the Bear: Pissed, but neither of these projects materialized. He published the last issue called Boris the Bear: My Neighbor... My Enemy in March 2010. It featured three other parody characters Smith was working on at Oasis Comics - Sir Walter, Lil' Monsters, and Bernardo the Shark.
