= Key (character) =

Two supervillains in DC Comics

- The Key as depicted in a page of JLA Secret Files & Origins #1 (July 1997). Art by Doug Mahnke).

Publication information
- Publisher: DC Comics
- First appearance: Justice League of America #41 (December 1965)
- Created by: Gardner Fox (writer); Mike Sekowsky (artist)

In-story information
- Species: Metahuman
- Team affiliations: Intergang; Injustice League; Secret Society of Super Villains
- Notable aliases: Star-Tsar
- Abilities: Key-shaped blaster; Enhanced senses, super-intelligence and telepathy due to psycho-chemical use; Uses psycho-chemicals and viruses to control others; Telepathic control over others (former power)

The Key is a supervillain appearing in media published by DC Comics, primarily as an enemy of the Justice League. The character continues to appear in Justice League and Batman comics, with a ghoulish appearance since 1997.

== Publication history ==
The Key first appeared in Justice League of America #41, and was created by Gardner Fox and Mike Sekowsky.

== Fictional character biography ==
The Key debuted in Justice League of America #41 (December 1965). The unidentified man known as the Key develops mind-expanding "psycho-chemicals" that activate his 10 senses. Assisted by henchmen known as "Key-Men" and a "key blaster" gun, the Key has several failed run-ins with the Justice League of America (JLA). The Key first drugs the Leaguers, which not only causes them to disband the Justice League, but also physically blinds them to the existence of the Key and his Key-Men. The Key fails to take into account Hawkman's sidekick, Hawkgirl, who frees him from the drug's effects. They free the other Leaguers, and the Key is imprisoned.

The Key returns three years later. During his last attack on the League, he left a subconscious command in their minds that would not allow them to leave the League's headquarters for one hour. At the end of that time, each Leaguer would turn on another and kill him or her. Superman defeats the Key by going back in time and sending his un-hypnotized self forward in time. He defeats each Leaguer in turn, and then imprisons the Key in the Fortress of Solitude in suspended animation.

The Key appeared to die six years later. He wires an entire city block of St. Louis, Missouri, with bombs, forcing the Justice League to pass through a series of traps to reach the device which will stop the detonation. The Key reveals that he was freed by a judge who found Superman's actions an unconstitutional use of cruel and unusual punishment. Incarcerated in a regular prison, he learns the psychoactive drugs he has taken have left him terminally ill. Released on humanitarian grounds, he attempts to destroy the League. The Phantom Stranger impersonates one of the Key-Men, helping to save the League. Green Lantern John Stewart drives the explosive force of the bombs down into the ground, and the Key escapes at the last moment.

The Key appears again in Justice League of America #150 (January 1978). The Manhunter Mark Shaw has given up his old identity to become a new hero named the Privateer. Doctor Light attempts to gain access to the Justice League Satellite, but is driven off by the Privateer. Light encounters a new villain, the Star-Tsar, and they briefly engage in battle. Eventually, the League discovers that Shaw is the Star-Tsar and used Snapper Carr and the Key as proxies. Additionally, the Key was deformed after being exposed to radiation in his previous encounter with the League.

Still in his dwarfish, barely mobile form, the Key attempts to cure himself by reactivating Amazo, which was stored in the Justice League Satellite. Zatanna uses magic to cure the Key, restoring the powers to the League. The Key makes a cameo appearance in Justice League of America #240 (July 1985). The time-traveling villain Dr. Anomaly observes the Key's second battle with the Justice League before launching his own attack on the superhero group.

The most recent incarnation of the Key is introduced in JLA #6 (June 1997), by Howard Porter and Grant Morrison, in a teaser at the beginning of the issue. The Moon begins to fall out of orbit in JLA #7 (July 1997), and the Key is seen to not be responsible. As the Leaguers return to the Justice League Watchtower on the Moon, the Key immobilizes them. The Key's new look is explained in JLA #8 (August 1997): The Key spent years in a drug-induced coma to unlock even more potential in his brain. The "psycho-chemicals" altered his appearance so that now the Key is a pale, cadaverous, white-haired humanoid with greatly heightened mental abilities. The Key uses a programmable "psycho-virus" to knock the Justice League's members unconscious and trap them in a shared dream. The League is saved when Connor Hawke defeats the Key, after which he is imprisoned in Arkham Asylum and Martian Manhunter renders him comatose.

The Key next appears in Gotham City, where he uses his psycho-chemicals to remove Batman's inhibition against killing. The Key's goal is to have Batman kill him, so that he might unlock the secret of death. Batgirl and Azrael must prevent Batman from committing murder until the drug wears off. The Key makes an appearance, along with a large group of villains, attacking the Justice League and Marvel Comics' the Avengers in 2003.

The JLA disbands in the "World Without a Justice League" storyline in 2006, in which the Key plays a major part. Unable to disable his telepathy, the Key comes close to insanity before realizing that killing people helps calm the voices. He commits mass murder using his psychic powers before the Justice League stop him. Afterward, Manitou Dawn sends the Key to a peaceful dream world.

In Infinite Crisis, the Key is shown during the Battle of Metropolis, although whether this takes place just before the events of "World without a Justice League" or after is not clear. He is later briefly seen to be a member of the Injustice League.

The Key reappears in Justice League of America (vol. 2) #17-18 (March–April 2008), although neither his cure nor his escape from the "dream plane" are explained. The Suicide Squad is collecting the world's supervillains to send them to the prison planet Salvation. Several villains, led by the Key, take refuge with the Justice League and are imprisoned. The villains assume that, once the danger of exile is past, the Key will be able to free them whenever they wish, but a dampening field in the prison prevents the Key from using his enhanced intelligence. The Key next appears having escaped from the Justice League's prison (somehow), and is briefly depicted as a member of the Secret Society of Super-Villains. He is next seen meeting with the supervillain Roulette a year later to receive information she had collected on the League. The Key is apparently working for someone else, but who it is, is never revealed.

The Key's next major appearance came in Batman: The Dark Knight (vol. 2) #1 (November 2011). The Key is depicted incarcerated in Arkham Asylum (although how he got there is unclear). An aggression-enhancing toxin is released into the air at Arkham, and Batman must battle the Key and a number of other villains as he penetrates the hospital to reach Two-Face. The Key makes another major appearance in the Justice League comic a year later, when he is freed from his cell during a riot at Arkham Asylum. Although quickly captured by Batman, Superman and Cyborg, the Key reveals that he and the Weapons Master were broken out of their cells only so that they could be interrogated by a new villain, David Graves, who wanted to know the weaknesses of the Justice League.

The Key appeared in a flashback in Black Canary and Zatanna: Bloodspell (July 2014).

=== DC Rebirth ===
In DC Rebirth reboot, the Key works with Troia, an evil alternate version of Donna Troy; captures Batman, Nightwing, Wonder Woman, Donna Troy, Barry Allen, Wally West, Aquaman, and Tempest; and traps them in a specially designed prison to manipulate them into destroying each other. However, the heroes escape and force the Key to retreat.

In World's Finest #8 (December 2022), the Key instills entamaphobia (the fear of doors) in everyone in Gotham City, leaving them afraid to leave their homes, and demands five billion dollars in ransom.

== Powers and abilities ==
Originally, the Key carried a blaster in the shape of a key. The psycho-chemicals he created also allowed him to access the unused portions of the brain, giving him enhanced intelligence and senses.

The Key is a master of chemistry, and utilizes chemicals (most often in the form of drugs) as weapons. He used drugs to bend the Justice League to his will twice, and Batman once. More recently, the Key created a programmable hallucinogenic psycho-virus. He created a machine that allowed him to steal energy from the mind of the infected person, and conceivably could make him the most powerful telepath in the universe (even able to open dimensional doorways at will).

The Key has shown an extraordinary capacity for creating androids and various kinds of machines. Aside from building his own Key-Man servant (which has some resistance to physical attacks and limited offensive capabilities), he was able to control Amazo as well. The Key built weapons and other devices capable of harnessing stellar radiation for their power, altering the Moon's orbit, harnessing dream-energy, and regenerating his own body using radiation. On one occasion, the Key developed a "vibrational prison" which was capable of immobilizing a wide range of heroes (including Superman). More recently, the Key altered his key-blaster so that instead of firing energy bolts, it fires debilitating psycho-chemicals.

== Other versions ==
An unrelated Key appears in All Star Comics #57 (March 1951). He is the head of a major crime syndicate before being killed during a battle with the Justice Society.

== In other media ==
=== Television ===
- The Key appears in Justice League Unlimited, voiced by Corey Burton. This version is a member of Gorilla Grodd's Secret Society who specializes in penetrating secure areas, possesses a form of intangibility, and wields a key-shaped gun that can easily open doors as well as operate like a regular gun. In audio commentary, the series producers stated that the Key was originally going to be possessed by, or be connected to, Brainiac, and play a larger role in the episode "Alive!". In the aforementioned episode, the Key is killed by Darkseid.
- The Key appears in Beware the Batman, voiced by JB Blanc. This version is a diminutive, elderly shopkeeper who can mold his fingers to fit any lock and download information from computers into his brain.

=== Film ===
The Key makes a cameo appearance in Justice League: The New Frontier.

=== Video games ===
- The Key appears as a boss in Justice League Heroes, voiced by Carlos Alazraqui. This version is affiliated with Brainiac.
- The Key appears as a character summon in Scribblenauts Unmasked: A DC Comics Adventure.

=== Miscellaneous ===
- The Key appears in the Green Lantern Corps Quarterly short story "G'nortin' But Trouble".
- The Key appears in Batman: The Brave and the Bold #5.
- The Key appears in DC Super Friends #6.

== See also ==
- List of Batman family enemies
