= Weapons Master =

- Cover art for The Brave and the Bold #29 (May 1960), art by Mike Sekowsky and Murphy Anderson.

Publication information
- Publisher: DC Comics
- First appearance: The Brave and the Bold #29 (May 1960)
- Created by: Gardner Fox; Mike Sekowsky

In-story information
- Alter ego: Xotar
- Abilities: Super-intelligence; Capable of building high-tech weapons

The Weapons Master (Xotar) is a supervillain who appears in various DC Comics publications. He was created by artist Mike Sekowsky and writer Gardner Fox. He first appeared in The Brave and the Bold #29.

== Fictional character biography ==
=== Pre-Crisis ===
Xotar was one of the first villains ever faced by the Justice League of America. He was a highly intelligent supervillain from the year A.D. 11,960. After obtaining the diary of Snapper Carr, he learned that he successfully destroyed the Justice League after travelling to the past using one of his four most powerful weapons. The diary was damaged, however, so he had to fight the Justice League in small groups until he could determine which weapon defeated them. His first battle was against the Flash at a missile base. Xotar used a shrinking ray which he called a microscopitor. Flash used his size to sneak inside the giant robot body Xotar used, destroyed the microscopitor and returned to normal size. Xotar then attacked the Panama Canal and battled Aquaman and the Martian Manhunter. Xotar used his de-evolutionizer and appeared to destroy the Martian Manhunter, though he actually turned invisible and destroyed the de-evolutionizer as Aquaman distracted him. He then battled Wonder Woman, Batman, and Green Lantern at Mount Rushmore. Xotar used his magneto-bubble weapon, which traps people in magnetic bubbles that are pulled towards the Sun. Green Lantern managed to break the bubbles with his power ring, and Wonder Woman snatched the machine with her lasso. He then battled all the Justice Leaguers with his illusion-maker weapon that would trick them into destroying each other. Superman's special vision allowed him to see past it and to destroy the fourth weapon. Xotar was then taken back to the future and turned over to law enforcement. As it turned out, the diary Xotar read actually told of his defeat, but it was so damaged that it looked like it said that he had won the fight.

Later Superman, Green Lantern and Wonder Woman are visiting a carnival when they stumble upon a plot by Xotar, whose race plans to conquer the Earth and set up the carnival in order to stop the Justice League. Taking the three heroes prisoner, and using their advanced technology to make two of their members look like Green Lantern and Flash, the aliens hope to trap the rest of the Justice League. While trying to trick Aquaman in the same trap, the captured League members manage to break free, and although their physical forms are distorted by a cosmic funhouse mirror, they manage to stop the impostors and their plot to take over the Earth.

=== Post-Crisis ===
When Guy Gardner, Booster Gold and Blue Beetle decide to restart the Justice League, their first meeting is attacked by the Weapons Master. With a veritable arsenal of futuristic weaponry at his command, he quickly takes down all combatants. With the League defeated, the Weapons Master claims Guy Gardner's power ring. As he turns to leave, he finds a new hero ready to face him – Bloodwynd. Bloodwynd channels the spirits of the dead to fight the Weapons Master. Unable to counter Bloodwynd's magic, the Weapons Master abducts the five fallen heroes and disappears, but the League eventually defeats him. The character also had set his target towards Superman but was again arrested.

=== The New 52 ===
In The New 52, Iron Heights Penitentiary is attacked by an unknown person looking for Cotar (revised from Xotar). Inmate Cotar survives the attack, only to be captured by Green Lantern and Flash before being interrogated by Wonder Woman. Cotar reveals the attacker to be David Graves, who has been viciously attacking a number of the Justice League's enemies, wanting to know how to hurt the Justice League.

== Powers and abilities ==
Xotar is super-intelligent and capable of building incredible weapons, though he actually steals most of the weapons that he uses.
