= Superboy and the Ravers =

American comic book series

- Cover of Superboy and the Ravers #1 (September 1996). Art by Paul Pelletier.

Publication information
- Publisher: DC Comics
- Schedule: Monthly
- Format: Ongoing when in publication
- Publication date: September 1996 - March 1998
- No. of issues: 19
- Main character(s): Superboy (Kon-El); Hero Cruz; Aura; Kaliber; Sparx; Half-Life; Kindred Marx; DJ

Creative team
- Created by: Karl Kesel, Steve Mattsson, and Paul Pelletier
- Written by: Karl Kesel; Steve Mattsson
- Penciller: Paul Pelletier
- Inker: Dan Davis

Superboy and the Ravers is an American comic book series that ran for 19 issues, from September 1996 to March 1998. The comic book chronicles the adventures of Superboy (Kon-El) and a group of superhumans called the Ravers.

== Plot ==
Sparx arrives and tells Superboy of a neverending party that she has joined. One night she takes Superboy there by teleportation. Superboy also meets Hero Cruz and Aura, after an altercation with some of the partygoers where Superboy finds that he does not understand their language. Superboy meets Kindred Marx, the proprietor of the rave called The Event Horizon. He marks Superboy with the symbol of a rising sun on his right hand, which enables him to travel to and from the Event Horizon.

Superboy is confronted by Kaliber, a juvenile delinquent from the planet Qward, who accuses Superboy of mocking Superman and attacks him. After Marx warns them that there is no fighting in the Rave, he transports them to the arena where they begin to fight. The Rave's DJ informs Marx that they are being pursued and leaves without Superboy and Kaliber, who discover that their pursuers are a group called Inter.C.E.P.T.

Kaliber and Superboy manage to fight off Inter.C.E.P.T. and thus Kaliber gains respect for Superboy, defending him from threats that have little chance of harming him.

Aura and her group calling themselves the fashion police are confronted by a mysterious zombie-like teenager calling himself Half-Life. Half-Life is a 1950s teenager who was killed by an alien spaceship's wreck. Its technology kept him alive by converting half his body into green slime. He has vowed revenge for the death of his family and girlfriend (whom he later reveals had been pregnant). He feels he does not fit in with the Ravers at first. Later, he wins a fancy alien motorcycle in a game of Truth or Dare, as well as becoming more a part of the group.

During an altercation with some Khundians who have repeatedly violated the rules of the Event Horizon, Marx revokes their passes. When one of them says that sending them back would be like signing their death warrants, Marx shows no remorse in taking them. He says, "I am prepared to face the consequences of my actions, prepare to face yours", showing that he will take the pass from anyone that violates the rules of the Event Horizon if they cross him, even if it means that they return to their homes and face death. It is also revealed that the Event Horizon is on the run from the Darkstars.

The Ravers group played vital parts in the limited series Genesis. The teleportation abilities the group were able to utilize were vital for the collected heroes of Earth. They also provided muscle during the battle against the forces of Darkseid and the simultaneous trip into the Source Wall, a battle in which Kaliber lost his vision after seeing the Source directly.

On a trip to Metropolis, they confront the villain Metallo. After his defeat, his enormous, metallic fists remained behind. The group converts them into housing for the needy.

Tensions arise in the group when Sparx discovers she cannot handle Hero Cruz's homosexuality.

The long-lived sentient canine Rex the Wonder Dog made several appearances in the book, associated with his new 'owner', Hero Cruz.

== Aftermath ==
- Superboy would go on to join Young Justice, and eventually become a member of the Teen Titans.
- Hero Cruz joined up with the Teen Titans's California-based branch, Titans West, before it was disbanded.
- Sparx was considered for membership in the Teen Titans, but was declined.
- Aura was chosen by Tim Drake as a candidate for the Teen Titans during a membership drive. Cyborg struck down the nomination, saying her habit of binge drinking could prove problematic.
