= Daily Planet (DC Comics house advertisement) =

The Daily Planet of January 22, 1979 (vol. 79, issue #3).

Daily Planet was a promotional page appearing in DC Comics publications from 1976 to 1981. The Daily Planet contained previews of upcoming stories, as well as recurring features like "The Answer Man", where DC writer/editor Bob Rozakis would answer questions sent in by readers, and a comic strip by cartoonist Fred Hembeck which poked fun at DC characters. Edited by Rozakis, the Daily Planet was set in the format of a page from the fictional Metropolis newspaper where Clark Kent worked.

== Publication history ==
The Daily Planet first appeared in House of Secrets #141, cover-dated May 1976. The volume numbers started at 76, to correspond with the debut year 1976. Each week, a new issue of the Planet appeared in selected issues of DC's lineup. As time went on, new materials and features were added, including puzzles, crosswords, and trivia.

Beginning in 1980, the Daily Planet was rotated with its sister publication, the "Feature Page", which often featured an expanded "Answer Man" column and "DC Profiles" of company creators. In 1981, the Planet was moved exclusively to DC Dollar Comics The Superman Family and World's Finest Comics. With only seven issues produced in 1981, the Daily Planet feature was discontinued after the December 1981 issue (DC cover date March 1982). The "Direct Currents" section was continued sporadically on some comics' letters pages.

212 editions of the Daily Planet were produced from 1976 to 1981.

=== Successors ===
In 1983, DC instituted a monthly column much more in the vein of Marvel's "Bullpen Bulletins". Titled "Meanwhile...", it was written by DC Executive Editor Dick Giordano for most of its history, which ran into the early 1990s. Unlike "Bullpen Bulletins", which was characterized by an ironic, over-hyped tone, Giordano's columns "were written in a relatively sober, absolutely friendly voice, like a friend of your father's you particularly liked and didn't mind sitting down to listen to". Giordano closed each "Meanwhile..." column with the characteristic words, "Thank you and good afternoon".

As the "Meanwhile..." column started to peter out, it was succeeded by a similar page called "DCI with Johnny DC". The Johnny DC column featured miscellaneous DC news items, often spotlighting certain books or creators, and also included a partial checklist of current DC titles.

== Recurring features ==
- The Answer Man — Rozakis answering reader-submitted questions ranging from basic trivia to obscure facts about DC characters.
  - What It's Worth? — Short-lived "sub-feature" created in response to frequent inquiries about the value of back issues.
- Hembeck — Three-panel strip that ran from 1978 until the Daily Planet's demise in 1981.
- Direct Currents — Checklist of DC comics on sale that week.

== Quotes ==
Writer Kurt Busiek:

But where the 'Bullpen Bulletins' talked about what the [Marvel Comics] staff was doing, and teased new projects in the works and such, the Daily Planet was a mock newspaper front page that ran in all the books, that had two or three 'articles' about books that'd be out on the stands the following week, plus a full checklist of what would be out next week, a list of what was on the stands this week, a cartoon by Fred Hembeck or a Q&A column with Bob 'The Answer Man' Rozakis, that sort of thing. And every week, I'd read those articles and that checklist, and I'd think, 'Huh, Batman meets Scalphunter in the next Brave & Bold. Do I want to buy that?' And, well, no, I didn't, not in that case — but at least I was more aware of what was coming out, and I thought about buying books I'd never even have looked at otherwise. That page probably sold me a lot of DC Comics over the years, and it made me aware of DC as a line, everything from Superman to Weird War Tales, from Justice League to Jonah Hex.

== See also ==
- The Amazing World of DC Comics
- DC Releases
- Johnny DC
- "Bullpen Bulletins"
- Comic book letter column
