= The Amazing World of DC Comics =

- Carmine Infantino's cover art for The Amazing World of DC Comics #1.
- Editor: Carl Gafford #1; Allan Asherman #2–7; Bob Rozakis #8; Neal Pozner #9; Paul Levitz #10–14, Special Edition #1; Cary Burkett #15–17
- Categories: DC Comics news and publicity
- Frequency: Bimonthly
- Publisher: DC Comics
- First issue: July/August 1974
- Final issue Number: April 1978; 17
- Country: United States
- Based in: New York City
- Language: English

The Amazing World of DC Comics was DC Comics' self-produced fan magazine of the mid-1970s. Running 17 issues, the fanzine featured DC characters and their creators, and was exclusively available through mail order. Primarily text articles, with occasional strips and comics features, Amazing World offered a great deal of insight into Bronze Age DC corporate and creative culture.

The bulk of the issues were edited by Allan Asherman and later by Paul Levitz and then Cary Burkett; individual issues were edited by Carl Gafford, Bob Rozakis, and Neal Pozner.

Contributors included Burkett, Ramona Fradon, Jack C. Harris, Nestor Redondo, Steve Skeates, Michael Uslan, Wally Wood, and Mark Gruenwald (in one of his few credits outside of Marvel Comics).

== Publication history ==
DC production manager Sol Harrison conceived of the idea of a DC "pro-zine", and assigned Bob Rozakis—who got his start in the industry through his many letters to comic book letter columns—to oversee its development. In addition to editing, Rozakis wrote for the publication and oversaw the letters page. Amazing World was co-edited by a group of fellow young fans-turned-DC Comics editorial employees that Rozakis termed the "Junior Woodchucks". Carl Gafford was a key contributor to the zine, doing editing, writing, production work and color separations.

Cost for a single issue subscription was US$1.50.

== Contents ==
Amazing World occasionally featured previously unpublished stories and artwork, including:

- Jack Kirby material intended for In the Days of the Mob #2 "Murder Inc"
- Tony DeZuniga artwork for Jonah Hex
- John Rosenberger's last penciled pages, originally intended for Wonder Woman

The premiere issue contained the following features:

- "The Celebrated Mr. K: Joe Kubert", by Guy H. Lillian III – an interview with Kubert conducted in his Dover, New Jersey, home
- "Direct Currents" – July & August coming attractions
- "Wonder Woman: TV Super-Agent", by Carl Gafford – article on the ABC "Tuesday Movie of the Week" featuring Cathy Lee Crosby as Wonder Woman
- "The Adventures of Superman" by Allan Asherman – overview of the television series and the two George Reeves movies it spawned
- "Meet the Woodchucks" – short bios and photos of the Amazing World staff
- "The Shadow" center spread, by Michael Kaluta – an unused cover from The Shadow
- "Remembering", by Allan Asherman – Sol Harrison discusses the beginnings of DC Comics
- "In Memoriam: Bill Finger", by E. Nelson Bridwell – short biography of Finger written on a tombstone with a Dick Giordano illustration of Batman at the gravesite
- "Sergio Takes a Look at DC", by Sergio Aragonés – one-panel gags about DC staff
- "The Letter Column: All Stars of Tomorrow?" by Bob Rozakis – Rozakis evaluates letterhacks with the potential, like him, to become comics professionals
- "Yesteryear", by E. Nelson Bridwell – a decade-by-decade retrospective
- "Murder, Inc.", by Jack Kirby and Mike Royer – unpublished 10-page story from the also unpublished In the Days of the Mob #2
- "How a Comic Book is Created", by Paul Levitz – the first in an ongoing in-depth feature on creating a story or comic from start to finish
- "It's a Bird, It's a Plane, It's... Superman in Technicolor", by Steve Mitchell – retrospective & index of the Max Fleischer Superman cartoons

Issue #7 promoted The Legend of King Arthur and the Knights of the Round Table by Gerry Conway and Nestor Redondo, a four-part King Arthur treasury edition series that was never published.

Issue #14 (March 1977) stated that Clark Kent's hometown of Smallville was in Maryland. Some years later, the Maryland location was supported in the actual comics with a map of Smallville and the surrounding area that was published in New Adventures of Superboy #22 (October 1981), which situated Smallville a few miles west of a large bay very similar to Delaware Bay. The same map placed Metropolis and Gotham City on the east and west sides of the bay, thus placing Gotham in New Jersey.

In addition to the 17 regular issues, in 1976 DC published an Amazing World of DC Comics Special Edition in conjunction with the Super DC Con '76 comic book convention, held between February 27 and 29, at the Americana Hotel, in New York City.

== Character contest ==
The Amazing World of DC Comics sponsored character-design contests that resulted in three winners:

- Nightwing (alter-ego: Lara Londo) – created by long-time Legion of Super-Heroes fan Robert Harris. The character's name was later changed to Nightwind and her alter-ego was renamed "Berta Harris" after her creator. She was introduced in Amazing World #12.
- Crystal Kid (alter-ego: Rondo Kane) – created by Robert Cohen of Calgary, Alberta, Canada. The character's alter-ego was renamed "Bobb Kohan" in honor of his creator. He was introduced in Amazing World #14.
- Lamprey (alter-ego: Angela Majors) – created by Scott Taylor of Portland, Texas. Lamprey's alter-ego was later changed to "Tayla Skott" in honor of her creator. She was introduced in Amazing World #14.

All three characters appeared in DC continuity as Legion Academy students in Legion of Super-Heroes vol. 2, #272 (Feb. 1981).

== See also ==
- FOOM
- Charlton Bullseye (fanzine)
- Daily Planet (DC Comics house advertisement)
- Johnny DC
