= Marvel Superheroes: What the--?! =

Animated web-series

- Genre: Animated sitcom; Superhero
- Based on: What The--?!
- Country of origin: United States

Production
- Production company: Marvel Entertainment

Original release
- Network: YouTube
- Release: 2009

Marvel SuperHeroes: What The--?! is Marvel Comics' self-parody stop-motion animated web-series. The series uses superhero action figures to create the stop motion animation. The series began in 2009.

== Episodes ==
=== Regular episodes ===
1. "There's No Business Like Snow Business"
2. "Red Carpet M.O.D.O.K."
3. "The Problem with Pirates"
4. "San Diego or Bust"
5. "M.O.D.O.K.'s M.O.M.E.N.T.S."
6. "Grumpy Old Man Logan"
7. "Thriller-er"
8. "Twi Harder"
9. "99 Hulk Balloons"
10. "The M.O.D.O.K. Holiday Special Featuring Tori Amos!"
11. "Deadpool - For Your Consideration"
12. "Iron Mania 2010"
13. "The Hero Your Hero Could Smell Like"
14. "X-Men vs. Vampires: Bite Me"
15. "Dr. Strange and the Magical Mixup"
16. "A Very Merry Spidey Day"
17. "Captain America vs. Iron Man: The Big Game!"
18. "For Your Consideration (Again)"
19. "M.O.D.O.K. Makes A Meme!"
20. "X-Men: The True Early Years!"
21. "Wolverine in "Partial Recall""
22. "Strange Halloween Tales of Suspense to Astonish!"
23. "Howard the Duck's Silver Anniversary!"
24. "The Amazing Spider-Date"
25. "Obnoxio The Clown Returns!!"
26. "The Age Of ULTRON"
27. "Ep. 27"
28. "San Diego Comic Con 2013 Special"
29. "Holiday Special with Iron Man & Deadpool"
30. "Deadpool Vs. The Punisher"
31. "Go Undercover with Captain America in Marvel Super Heroes"
32. "The Inferior Spider-Man"
33. "Daredevil Vs. She-Hulk"
34. "Thanos Returns to Comic-Con"
35. "Catchphrase Workshop"
36. "Avengers & X-Men: AXIS"
37. "2014 Halloween Spooktacular"
38. "Holiday Spectacular 2014"
39. "Ultron's Master Plan"
40. "Happy Valentine's Day?"
41. "Ultron & Vision: Robo Roomies"
42. "Wonder Man's Secret Wars"
43. "Ant-Man's No Small Feats"
44. "All-New, All-Different Avengers"
45. "Halloween Spooktacular 2015"
46. "Holiday Spectacular 2015"
47. "New Years Resolutions!"
48. "A Magical Valentines Special"
49. "Daredevil vs. Punisher"
50. "50th Episode Extravaganza!"
51. "Happy Fourth of July!"
52. "The Other Agents of S.H.I.E.L.D."
53. "Captain America's Wartime Friends!"
54. "Doctor Strange's Strange Tales"
55. "Father's Day Special 2017"
56. "Stark Tank | NOT another ULTRON
57. "Who will win Marvel Bad Guy Island?!"
58. "Marvel Super Heroes What The --?! will return soon."
59. "Meet the Real Heroes of Westchester County. 💅"
60. "Villain$¢on"
61. “The 86th Watcher Awards”
62. "Galactus Almost Rage Quits"
63. "Marvel Zombies: The Musical"
64. "Doctor Doom Says Come Visit Latveria"
65. "Animal Avengers... Assemble!"
66. "Civil War - Class Reunion"
67. "The X-Men do an X-Scape Room"

=== Special episodes ===
1. "Pilot"
2. "Unleash The Fury"
3. "Extended Comic-Con Special"
4. "All-New Promo"
5. "SIEGE Promo"
6. "MarvelFest Extravaganza!"
7. "Winter Games Coverage!"
8. "Winter Games: Day 1"
9. "Winter Games: Day 2"
10. "Winter Games: Day 3"
11. "Winter Games: Day 9"
12. "Winter Games: Day 11"
13. "Winter Games: Day 12"
14. "Winter Games: Day 14"
15. "Winter Games: Day 15"
16. "Winter Games: Day 16"
17. "Winter Games: Day 17"
18. "Shadowland Promo"
19. "NYCC Promo"
20. "Mean Deadpool Big Game Ad"
21. "MODOK 1984—er, 2011"
22. "Marvel Frogs Big Game Ad"
23. "127 Seconds (For Your Consideration)"
24. "Legitimate Moxie (For Your Consideration)"
25. "The Red Hulk (For Your Consideration)"
26. "Earth Day!"
27. "Thor Joins 7-Eleven"
28. "Harley Davidson Special"
29. "Who Watches The Watcher - Official Theme Song Music Video"
30. "The Incredible Drive: Part One"
31. "The Incredible Drive: Part Two"
32. "The Incredible Drive: Part Three"
33. "The Incredible Drive: Part Four"
34. "Avengers vs. X-Men Part 1"
35. "Avengers vs. X-Men Part 2"
36. "Avengers vs. X-Men Part 3"
37. "The Perfect Combination"
38. "Marvel vs. Capcom!"
39. "Valentine's Day Special"
40. "Vans Special"
41. "Guardians of the Galaxy Special"
42. "Wolverine Adamantium Collection"
43. "GEEK WEEK"
44. "Unlimited Plus"
45. "NYCC 2013"
46. "Huawei Special Pt. 1"
47. "The Lost Episode"
48. "NYCC 2015 Teaser"
49. "Western Union Special"
50. "The Secret Origin of Delivery-Man"
51. "A Tall Order"
52. "Civil War"
53. "Send Money with Your Phone!"
54. "Out of the Blue!"
55. "Strange Destinations"
56. "Strange Destinations (Alternate Ending)"
57. "Cooking with Galactus"

== See also ==
- Not Brand Echh
- What The--?!
- Robot Chicken
- What If...?
- List of television series based on Marvel Comics publications
