= What The--?! =

Marvel Comics comic book series self-parodying the Marvel Universe

- Cover to What The--?! #26, the last issue of the series, art by Doug Rice.

Publication information
- Publisher: Marvel Comics
- Format: Ongoing series
- Genre: Superhero
- Publication date: August 1988 – Winter 1993
- No. of issues: 26

What The--?! is a Marvel Comics comic book series self-parodying the Marvel Universe as well as characters from the DC Comics Universe. Similar in vein to the 1960s series Not Brand Echh, it was billed as "The Marvel mag of mirth and mayhem!" The series ran for 26 issues, from August 1988 through Winter 1993, with issue #26 being a Fall Special. It typically contained a series of short stories with comedic takes on Marvel heroes, and villains, such as having Spider-Ham substitute for Spider-Man.

== Concept ==
What The--?! spotlighted some of the top artists and writers at the time. Many, such as Stan Lee and John Byrne, contributed works that spoof some of their all-time greatest successes. For example, in issue #2, Byrne creates a tale pitting his work on the Fantastic Four franchise against his work with Superman. The issue goes so far as to have the Lex Luthor character complain about the changes Byrne made to the Superman legend after DC Comics' Crisis on Infinite Earths.

Though it carried the Marvel Comics label on the front left corner, What The--?! touted itself as being published by "Marble Comics". What The--?! parodied Marvel institutions such as the legendary Marvel Comics fan mail page, with staged articles called "The Marble Mailbag" and the "What The...Mail". The title also did not contain any "true" advertisements. Instead, What The--?! hosted a number of fake advertisements that made fun of classic comic book advertisements such as Charles Atlas, novelty by-mail companies, and the Hostess snack food ads of the 1970s and 1980s.

== History ==
What The--?! was originally published as a four-issue limited series. The last issue closed with an appeal from Fred Hembeck for readers to write to Marvel if they wanted to see more of the comic book. Several months later, What The--?! returned, resuming its numbering at issue #5.

Marvel.com has a web series called "Marvel Superheroes: What the--?!", mainly featuring MODOK and Deadpool.

== List of What The--?! issues ==
Issue #	Characters	Characters parodied	Notable writers/artists	Year/month published
1	The Pulverizer, the Bower Brats, Clunk and Dagnabbit, the X-Persons and New Pubescents, the Watchman	The Punisher, Power Pack, Cloak and Dagger, the X-Men and related mutant teams of the time, the Watcher, the Beyonder	Peter B. Gillis, Hilary Barta, June Brigman, John Severin, Terry Austin, Jon Bogdanove, Steve Ditko, Al Milgrom	August 1988
2	The Fantastical Four, Superbman, Knick Furey, Woof R' Ream, Doctor Deranged	The Fantastic Four, Superman, Nick Fury, Wolverine, Doctor Strange	John Byrne, John Severin	September 1988
3	Spider-Ham, Vizzion and Scarlett Wench, Bat-Man, Scaredevil, Mutant Beach Party Chapter 1	Spider-Man, the Vision and the Scarlet Witch, Batman, Daredevil, assorted mutants	Glenn Herdling, Alex Saviuk, Kurt Busiek, Joe Sinnott, Fred Hembeck	October 1988
4	Mutant Beach Party Chapter 2, Doctor Deranged, Shang-Chew, Starchy, Lone Wolvie and Chris	The X-Men, the New Mutants, Doctor Strange, Shang-Chi, Archie, Lone Wolf and Cub	John Byrne, Kurt Busiek, Peter David, Fred Hembeck, David Schwartz	November 1988
5	The Pulverizer vs. Wolvoream, the Alien-ated Legion	The Punisher, Wolverine, the Alien Legion	Peter B. Gillis, Erik Larsen, Al Gordon, Terry Austin, Jim Lee, Chuck Dixon, Larry Stroman, Walt Jaschek, Whilce Portacio, Al Milgrom, Al Williamson, Hilary Barta, Doug Rice	July 1989
6	Smacks of Vengeance, Man-Thang, Swamp Thang, Sore, the Pulverizer	Acts of Vengeance, the Man-Thing, the Swamp Thing, Thor, the Punisher	Stan Lee, John Byrne, Terry Austin, Hilary Barta, Doug Rice, Howard Mackie, Peter B. Gillis	January 1990
7	The Revengers, Just-A-League, Awful Flight	The Avengers, the Justice League of America, Alpha Flight	Scott Lobdell, Marc McLauren, Tom DeFalco	April 1990
8	The Goon Knight, Son of Santa, Klang	The Moon Knight, the Son of Satan, Kang the Conqueror, Forbush Man returns	Scott Lobdell, Kurt Busiek	July 1990
9	Wolvie	Wolverine	John Byrne, Peter David, Scott Lobdell, Don McGregor	October 1990
10	What The--?! X-Mas Special: Milk and Cookies, Santa Doom, Chaplain America	Cloak and Dagger, Doctor Doom, Captain America	Scott Lobdell, John Byrne, AKIRA (Ayehearya)	January 1991
11	Wolverina	Wolverine		March 1991
12	Moanin' the Bavarian, Scarlet Itch	Conan the Barbarian, the Scarlet Witch	Rurik Tyler, Darren Auck	May 1991
13	Silver Burper, Bratman, Goose Rider, My-Fist-Toe	The Silver Surfer, Batman, the Ghost Rider, Mephisto	Stan Lee, Joe Quesada, Darren Auck	July 1991
14				September 1991
15	Strange Young Fighting Frogs, Tony Stork, Captain Ultra	The Teenage Mutant Ninja Turtles, Tony Stark	Scott Lobdell, Joe Quesada, Darren Auck	November 1991
16	Ock Around the Christmas Tree, Milk and Cookies, Ka-Mart, the Vault of What The--?!	'Twas the Night Before Christmas, Cloak and Dagger, Ka-zar, The Vault of Horror (EC Comics)	Scott Lobdell, Darren Auck	January 1992
17	Environmental issue: Wolverweenie and Pulverizer save the rainforest	Wolverine, the Punisher		March 1992
18				May 1992
19	Ghost Writer, the Pulverizer, Wolvie, Knick Furey, Doctor Deranged	The Ghost Rider, the Punisher, Wolverine, Nick Fury, Doctor Strange	Scott Lobdell, Rick Stasi, Mike DeCarlo, Sholly Fisch, Rurik Tyler, Doug Rice, Hilary Barta	July 1992
20	The Infinity Wart, Pork Grind	The Infinity War, Venom		August 1992
21	Sheeza-Hulk, Toast Rider	The She-Hulk, the Ghost Rider, Weapon X	Marie Severin, Darren Auck, Hilary Barta	September 1992
22	The Pulverizer, Wolverweenie, Spider-Ham, Hazards of Being a Supervillain, Salem's Pot	The Punisher, Wolverine, Spider-Man, supervillains, Forbush Man	Joe Quesada, Hilary Barta, Roger Brown	October 1992
23	Superb Pro, Nick Furious, New Worriers	Super Pro, Nick Fury, the New Warriors, Forbush Man	Hilary Barta	November 1992
24	Roasting the Infinity Gauntlet	The Infinity Gauntlet		December 1992
25	Mutant parody issue	The X-Men, the New Mutants, X-Factor, X-Force		Summer 1993
26	Spider-Ham 15.88	Spider-Man 2099		Winter 1993
