= Marvel Age =

Comic book-sized magazine

- Marvel Age #1 (April 1983), cover art by Walt Simonson.

Publication information
- Publisher: Marvel Comics
- Schedule: Monthly
- Format: Ongoing series
- Genre: Superhero
- Publication date: April 1983 – September 1994
- No. of issues: 140 issues, 4 annuals, 2 preview issues, 2 specials

Marvel Age was a promotional comic book-sized magazine from Marvel Comics published from 1983 to 1994. Basically a comic-length edition of the Bullpen Bulletins page, Marvel Age contained previews of upcoming Marvel comics, as well as interviews with comics professionals and other features, including occasional original comic strips. It is also notable for early work by Marvel writers such as Peter David and Kurt Busiek.

== Publication history ==
Marvel Age published 140 issues, four annuals, two preview issues, and two specials during its eleven-year run.

Regular features of Marvel Age included:

- Coming Attractions — listings all of Marvel books on sale by the week they were supposed to come out.
- News Watch — an expansion of the gossipy news items featured in Bullpen Bulletins pages.
- Behind the Line — Marvel editors writing about the business from their side of the creative process.
- A regular humor comic by Fred Hembeck poking fun at Marvel's history and characters.
- Creator interviews.
- Articles about and ads for current Marvel titles.
- Letters — similar to most letters pages in comics at the time, this one addressed more general questions and commentary relating to the Marvel Universe. The column had a different humorous title in every issue, selected from reader submissions.

The superhero parody character Forbush Man, previously the mascot for Marvel's satirical comic book, Not Brand Echh, appeared or was at least mentioned as the mascot of Marvel Age in issues #8 through #112.

== See also ==
- DC Releases
- Direct Currents
- FOOM
- Pizzazz
- Marvel Adventures (also originally titled Marvel Age)
