= Snafu (magazine) =

Comic magazine

Publication information
- Publisher: Marvel Comics
- Schedule: Irregular
- Genre: Humor/comedy
- Publication date: November 1955 – March 1956
- No. of issues: 3
- Main character: Irving Forbush

Snafu is a short-lived satirical comic book published by Marvel Comics in the mid-1950s. One notable contribution of Snafu is that it introduced the character Irving Forbush, the alter ego of Forbush Man (created by Stan Lee). Snafu was an attempt to duplicate the success of Mad magazine, which had much greater success and longevity.

The only three issues of Snafu were published in November 1955, January 1956 and March 1956, respectively.

Personnel who worked on Snafu included Stan Lee (the primary writer) and artists John Severin, Bill Everett and Joe Maneely.

Ten years later, when Stan Lee wrote promotional text for the new Marvel Comics line, he started dropping the name Irving Forbush as an in-joke. In 1967, Forbush was embodied in Not Brand Echh as Forbush-Man.
