= Johnny DC =

- 2006 version of Johnny DC

Publication information
- Publisher: DC Comics

In-story information
- Full name: Johnny DC
- Supporting character of: Various DC Comics properties, Ambush Bug
- Notable aliases: Jonni DC, Continuity Cop

Johnny DC is a character that DC Comics has used at various times as a mascot for its lines of comic books, and occasionally as a metafictional character who comments on the comics in which he appears.

== History ==
The character originally appeared in various Silver Age DC Comics advertisements, and was used to promote DC's entire line of comics. He had a cartoonish face, wore a mortarboard, had stick figure lines for his arms and legs, and a body that consisted of the DC Comics logo.

In the late 1980s, Johnny DC hosted a DC promo page called "DCI with Johnny DC" which appeared in many comics of the era. Like Marvel's "Bullpen Bulletins"—and DC's previous incarnation, the late 1970s/early 1980s Daily Planet feature—"DCI with Johnny DC" featured miscellaneous DC news items, often spotlighting certain books or creators, and also included a partial checklist of current DC titles.

In the mid-1990s, Johnny DC appeared in the satirical special Sergio Aragonés Destroys DC. He is shown as having become disillusioned with the modern direction of DC's superhero comics, criticizing the various members of the Justice League and accusing them of having changed for the worse, before turning into a "psychotic and badly-drawn" pastiche of 1990s comic book anti-heroes in an attempt to destroy the heroes, only to be defeated when Batman tricks him into saying his name backwards à la Mr. Mxyzptlk.

In 2004, Johnny DC was revived and redesigned, as a mostly-silhouette cartoonish child. His name is now used as the name of DC Comics' imprint of comics marketed primarily to children, approximately ages 8–13. The line consists primarily of books based on Warner Bros. and Cartoon Network animated TV series. These have included series that began as animated features (e.g. Scooby-Doo and Looney Tunes) and those based on DC Comics animated series (Krypto the Superdog, The Batman Strikes!, Teen Titans Go!, Legion of Super Heroes in the 31st Century, Justice League Unlimited and Super Friends, based on the eponymous Imaginext toyline). The letter columns of these titles are supposedly edited by Johnny DC.

In April 2012, Johnny DC imprints has been discontinued and replaced with DC Comics "swirl" imprints.

Johnny DC also appears in the game Lego DC Super-Villains as the character that helps the player to solve puzzles and that gives the player the location of the several golden bricks across the free roam.

== Jonni DC ==
A female version of the character appears in Ambush Bug comics from 1986 to 1992 as "Jonni DC, Continuity Cop". In early appearances, she investigated Ambush Bug's casual violations of DC Universe canon. In the 2008 miniseries Ambush Bug: Year None, Ambush Bug is called in to investigate Jonni DC's apparent murder. Later she rises again as a sedated, controlled Black Lantern.

In 2018–19, Jonni appears in The New 52 universe in Harley Quinn comics. She vows to stop Harley Quinn from destroying the continuity of the entire DC Universe.
