= Booby prize =

Joke prize given for last place

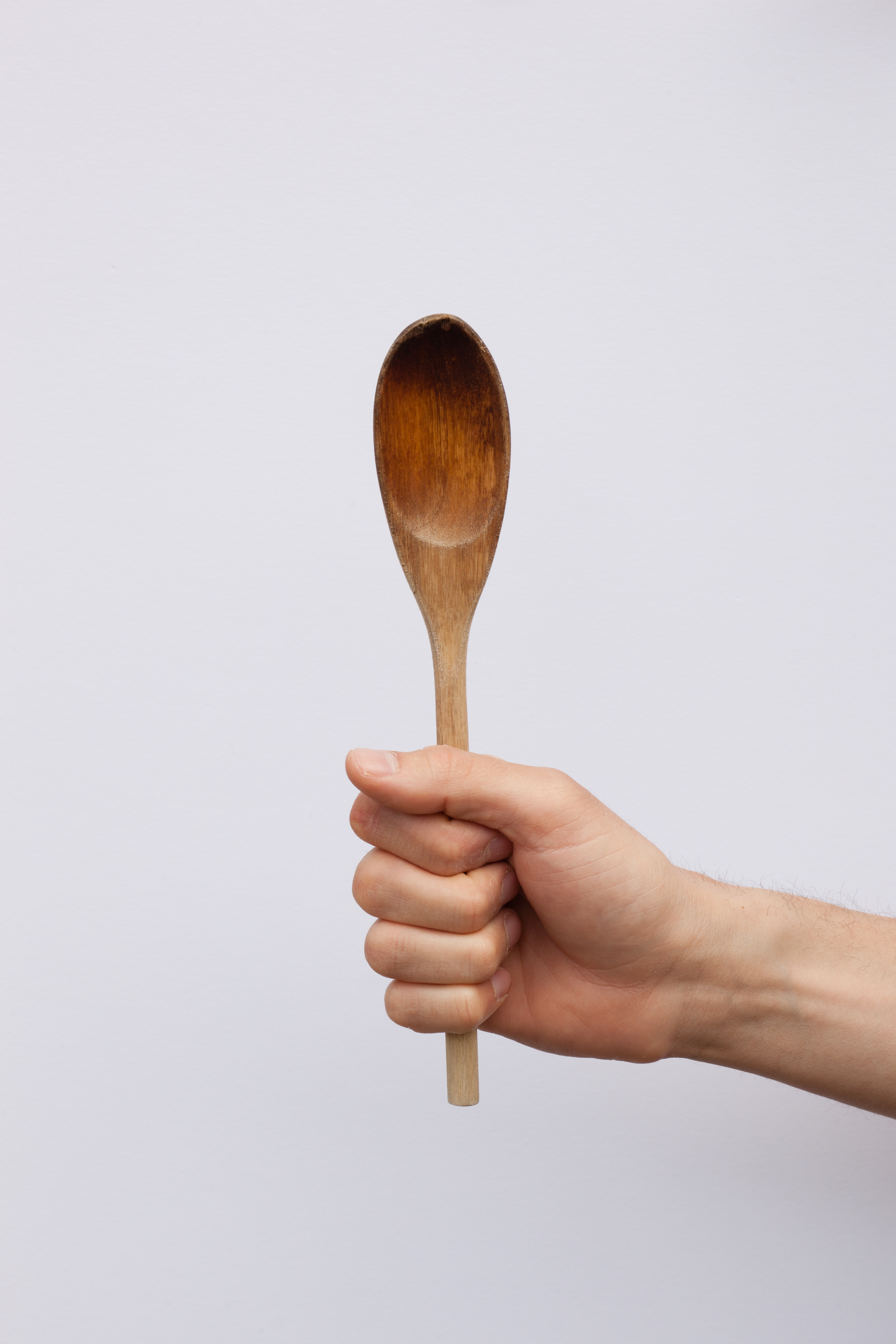
A wooden spoon is a common booby prize in sporting events

A booby prize is a joke prize usually given in recognition of a terrible performance or a last-place finish. Booby prizes are typically worthless, but they are sometimes jokingly coveted as an object of pride. Notable examples of booby prizes include the wooden spoon, which originated at the University of Cambridge as an award for the lowest grade in a mathematics exam before becoming popular in sports, and the title of lanterne rouge, given to the last-place finisher of the Tour de France.

The word booby stems from the Spanish bobo meaning silly, which in turn came from the Latin balbus meaning stammering; the word booby to mean dunce appeared in 1599. Booby prize literally means "idiot's prize". The OED dates this usage to 1893. Booby trap and booby hatch are related terms.

== See also ==
- Darwin Awards
- Golden Raspberry Awards
- Ig Nobel Prize
- Marvel No-Prize
