= Prize =

Award given to recognise or reward actions

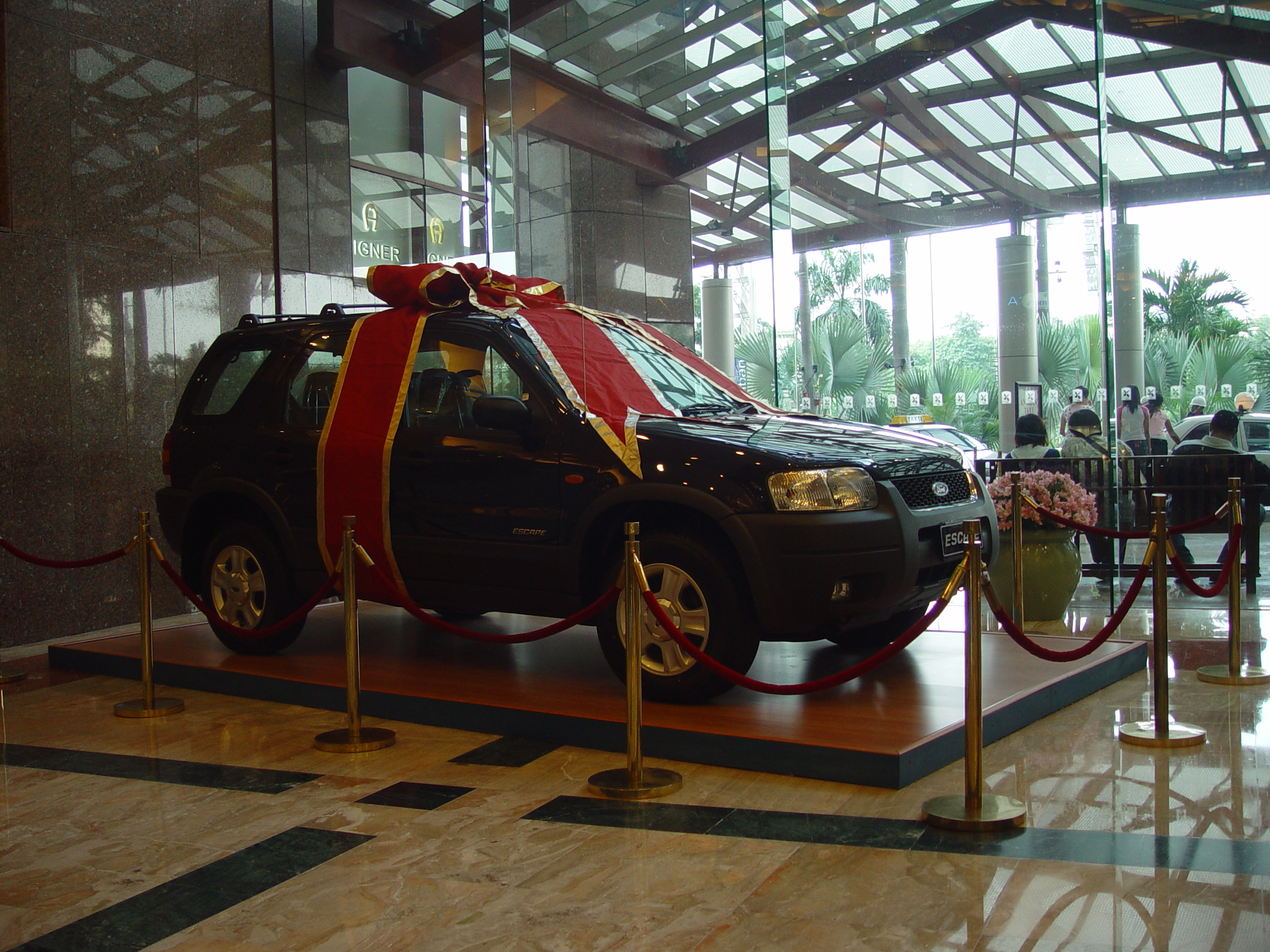
A car prize at a shopping mall in Indonesia

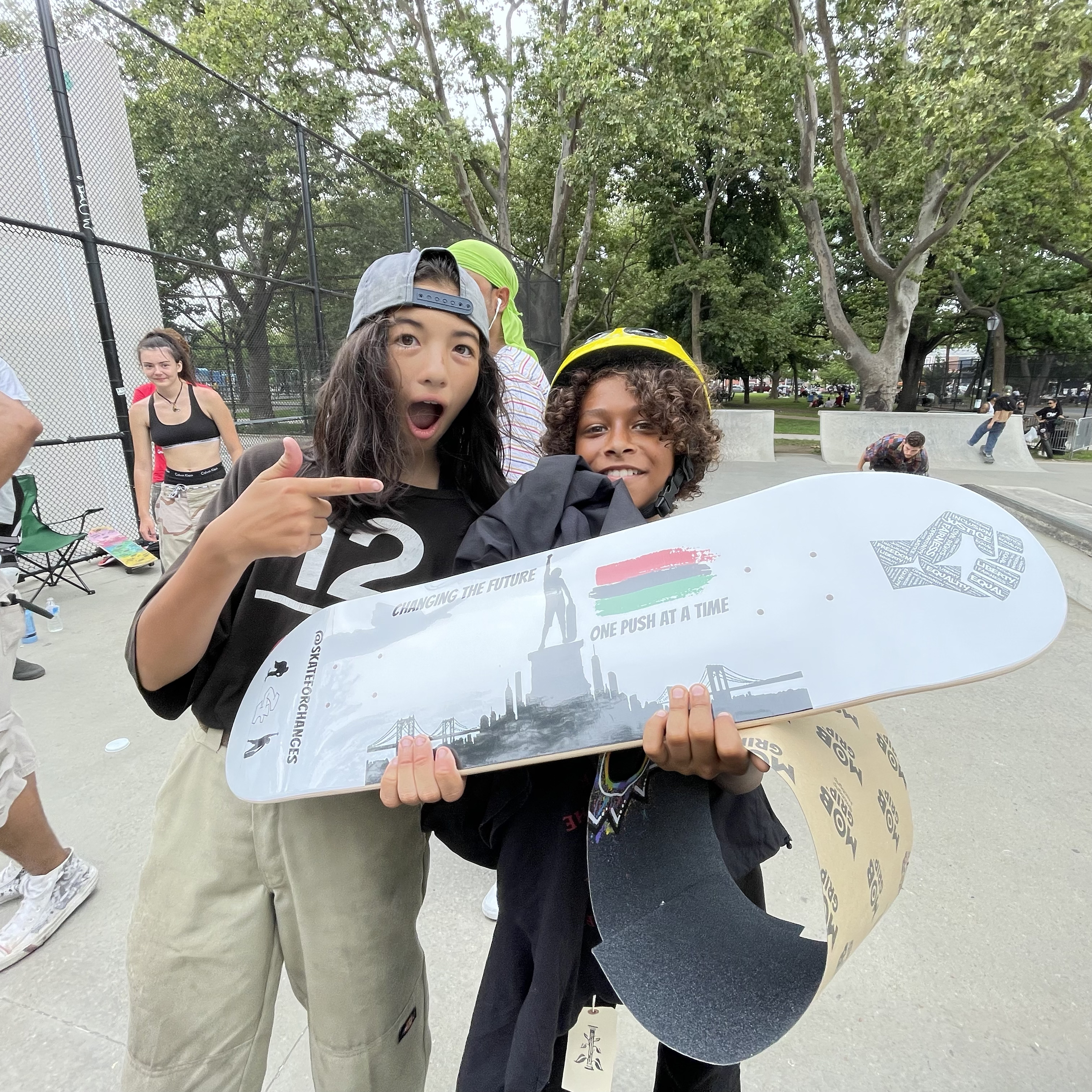
Skateboarders excited to receive a free skateboard deck as a prize at a skate contest, 2021

A prize is an award to be given to a person or a group of people (such as sporting teams and organizations) to recognize and reward their actions and achievements. Official prizes often involve monetary rewards as well as the fame that comes with them. Some prizes are also associated with extravagant awarding ceremonies, such as the Academy Awards.

Prizes are also given to publicize noteworthy or exemplary behaviour, and to provide incentives for improved outcomes and competitive efforts. In general, prizes are regarded in a positive light, and their winners are admired. However, many prizes, especially the more famous ones, have often caused controversy and jealousy.

Specific types of prizes include:

- Booby prize: typically awarded as a joke or insult to whoever finished last (e.g., wooden spoon award).
- Consolation prize: an award given to those who do not win but are deemed worthy of recognition.
- Hierarchical prizes, where the best award is "first prize", "grand prize", or "gold medal". Subordinate awards are "second prize", "third prize", etc., or "first runner-up" and "second runner-up", etc., or "silver medal" and "bronze medal". (In some contests, "grand prize" is more desirable than "first prize".)
  - On game shows in the UK, the term is "star prize", while in Australia, it is "major prize".
- Purchase prize or acquisition prize: a monetary prize given in an art competition in exchange for the winning work.
- Winnings from an inducement prize contest, usually a reward for accomplishing a specific feat of use to the sponsor or society at large

== See also ==
- Award
- Medal
- Prize (law)
- Prize money, monetary award that is given to someone after they have won a competition.
- Prizes named after people
- Repechage
