= DC Releases =

Comics newsletter

DC Releases was a monthly promotional newsletter published by DC Comics from 1984 to 1988.

== Background ==
DC Releases was a replacement for DC's previous promotional newsletter, Coming Attractions, and ran for 48 issues. In 1988, it was replaced by Direct Currents.

The format of DC Releases was a four-page, 8.5" by 11" pamphlet, similar to Coming Attractions. It was printed in black and white (although early issues would use a color surprint), on white (and later, color) paper. The first page featured a story about one or more DC Comics titles being released that month. The other three pages would contain additional articles and a list of that month's new releases. For several issues, DC Releases contained interviews with DC staff, conducted by Lynn Vannucci. Each issue was distributed free of charge by local comic book shops.

== List of issues ==
No.	Cover Date	Cover Story	Notes
1	June 1984	Blue Devil ongoing series	
2	July 1984	Sun Devils maxi-series	
3	August 1984	New Teen Titans vol. 2 and Legion of Super-Heroes vol. 3 deluxe format series	
4	September 1984	Jemm, Son of Saturn maxi-series	
5	October 1984	Superman #400 (anniversary issue) and The Superman #400 Portfolio	
6	November 1984	New Gods vol. 2 #6 (the conclusion to the New Gods storyline)	
7	December 1984	Spanner's Galaxy mini-series	Jenette Kahn interview
8	January 1985	Jonni Thunder AKA Thunderbolt mini-series	Len Wein interview
9	February 1985	V ongoing series	Julius Schwartz interview
10	March 1985	Who's Who: The Definitive Directory of the DC Universe maxi-series	Neal Pozner interview
11	April 1985	Crisis on Infinite Earths maxi-series	Alan Moore interview
12	May 1985	The Shadow War of Hawkman mini-series	Bob Rozakis interview
13	June 1985	Ambush Bug mini-series	Joe Orlando interview
14	July 1985	Red Tornado mini-series	Judy Fireman interview
15	August 1985	Green Lantern vol. 2 #191 (the identity of the Predator)	
16	September 1985	Hex ongoing series	
17	October 1985	Crisis on Infinite Earths #7 (the death of Supergirl)	
18	November 1985	The Outsiders ongoing series	
19	December 1985	Me and Joe Priest graphic novel	
20	January 1986	'Mazing Man ongoing series	
21	February 1986	Booster Gold ongoing series	
22	March 1986	Deadman vol. 2 mini-series	
23	April 1986	Secret Origins vol. 2 ongoing series	
24	May 1986	Electric Warrior ongoing series	
25	June 1986	Blue Beetle ongoing series	
26	July 1986	Metalzoic graphic novel	
27	August 1986	Angel Love maxi-series	
28	September 1986	Watchmen maxi-series	
29	October 1986	The Man of Steel mini-series	
30	November 1986	Legends mini-series and crossover	
31	December 1986	Cosmic Boy mini-series	
32	January 1987	Superman vol. 2, The Adventures of Superman, and Action Comics ongoing series	
33	February 1987	Wonder Woman vol. 2 ongoing series	
34	March 1987	Captain Atom ongoing series; Detective Comics #572 (50th anniversary issue)	
35	April 1987	The Spectre vol. 2 ongoing series	
36	May 1987	Justice League ongoing series	
37	June 1987	The Flash vol. 2 ongoing series	
38	July 1987	Doctor Fate mini-series	
39	August 1987	Green Arrow: The Longbow Hunters mini-series	
40	September 1987	Silverblade maxi-series	
41	October 1987	The Doom Patrol vol. 2 ongoing series	
42	November 1987	Slash Maraud mini-series	
43	December 1987	Sonic Disruptors maxi-series	
44	January 1988	Millennium maxi-series and crossover	
45	February 1988	Millennium maxi-series and crossover; Green Arrow vol. 2 ongoing series	
46	March 1988	Blackhawk vol. 2 mini-series	
47	April 1988	The Weird mini-series; Legion of Super-Heroes' 30th anniversary (Legion of Super-Heroes vol. 3 #45, Who's Who in the Legion of Super-Heroes mini-series, and Secret Origins vol. 2 #25)	
48	May 1988	Action Comics #600 (anniversary issue) and Superman: The Earth Stealers one-shot	

== See also ==
- Comic Shop News
- Marvel Age
