= Direct Currents =

DC Comics promotional feature

Direct Currents is the name of several promotional features by DC Comics, including a long-running newsletter.

== History ==
Direct Currents was first used as the name of a text feature appearing in DC's comics beginning in 1966. In the 1970s, the feature appeared in DC's fan magazine The Amazing World of DC Comics. From the late 1970s to the early 1980s, the name was also used for one of the features in DC's Daily Planet house ads.

From November 1976 to July 1977, DC had a toll-free phone number called the Direct Currents Hot-Line, where fans could hear pre-recorded messages from DC staff about upcoming titles. The phone number was very popular, receiving an average of 100,000 calls a week toward its end, and had to be shut down due to strain on the telephone system.

Beginning in 1978 and lasting a little more than a year, Direct Currents was the name for a one-page newsletter. The newsletter, which was available by subscription, featured a 13" by 18" poster cover.

In 1988, Direct Currents became the title of a free monthly newsletter distributed by comic book stores, containing articles about DC Comics titles being released that month as well as a checklist of the month's new releases. It was a replacement for DC's previous newsletter, DC Releases. Unlike DC Releases, which was printed in black and white and magazine-sized, Direct Currents was printed in color and was the size of a regular comic book. Eventually, Direct Currents contained a flipbook format, with one side containing features about DC Universe titles, and the other containing features about titles from DC's Vertigo and Paradox Press imprints. The newsletter ran for a total of 92 issues, ending in 1995, and also produced two specials.

Beginning in November 2016, the name was used for a free quarterly magazine offering sneak peeks of every DC title. However, the book was cancelled after only one issue.

== List of Direct Currents issues ==
=== 1988-1997 ===
Issue Number	Date (Note: Date refers to the books' shipping dates from issues 1-49, and the books' cover dates from issue 50 on.)	Cover Story	Notes
1	February 9 - March 8, 1988	Flash Gordon maxi-series	
2	March 15 - April 5, 1988	Action Comics Weekly ongoing series; Superman vol. 2 ongoing series becomes twice-monthly	
3	April 12 - May 10, 1988	Power of the Atom ongoing series	
4	May 17-31, 1988	V for Vendetta maxi-series	
5	June 7-28, 1988	Hawk and Dove vol. 2 mini-series	
6	July 5-26, 1988	Cosmic Odyssey mini-series	
7	August 2-30, 1988	The Prisoner mini-series	
8	September 6-27, 1988	Plastic Man vol. 2 mini-series	
9	October 4-25, 1988	Invasion! mini-series	
10	November 1-29, 1988	Black Orchid mini-series	
11	December 6-20, 1988	The Greatest Joker Stories Ever Told hardcover	
12	January 3-31, 1989	The Huntress ongoing series	
13	February 1989	Justice League Europe ongoing series	
14	March 1989	"The Janus Directive" crossover	
15	April 1989	Skreemer mini-series	
16	May 1989	Lex Luthor: The Unauthorized Biography one-shot	
17	June 1989	The Batman Movie Adaptation one-shot	
18	July 1989	Justice, Inc. vol. 2 mini-series	
19	August 1989	The Shadow Strikes! ongoing series	
20	September 1989	The Legion of Super-Heroes vol. 4 ongoing series; The Legion of Super-Heroes: The Great Darkness Saga trade paperback	
21	October 1989	Arkham Asylum: A Serious House on Serious Earth graphic novel	
22	November 1989	Deadman: Love after Death mini-series	
23	December 1989	The Greatest Golden Age Stories Ever Told hardcover	
24	January 1990	Adam Strange mini-series	
25	February 1990	Batman: Digital Justice graphic novel	
26	March 1990	The Butcher mini-series	
27	April 1990	Hawkworld vol. 2 ongoing series	
28	May 1990	The Demon vol. 3 ongoing series	
29	June 1990	World's Finest mini-series	
30	July 1990	Enemy Ace: War Idyll graphic novel	
31	August 1990	The Doom Patrol vol. 2 #37 (Rhea Jones awakes from her coma)	
32	September 1990	Twilight mini-series	
33	October 1990	Batman 3D graphic novel	
34	November 1990	The Books of Magic mini-series	Flip book
34	November 1990	Robin mini-series	Flip book
35	December 1990	The Greatest Flash Stories Ever Told hardcover	
36	January 1991	Angel and the Ape vol. 2 mini-series	
37	February 1991	Kid Eternity mini-series	
38	March 1991	Armageddon 2001 mini-series and crossover	
39	April 1991	Star Trek's 25th anniversary (Star Trek: The Mirror Universe Saga trade paperback)	
40	May 1991	Impact Comics line debuts (The Legend of the Shield ongoing series)	Includes 16-page Impact Comics preview
41	June 1991	Impact Comics line continues (The Comet and The Jaguar ongoing series)	
42/43	July 1991	War of the Gods mini-series and crossover	Double issue flip book
42/43	August 1991	The Psycho mini-series	Double issue flip book
44	September 1991	Sandman-related releases	
45	October 1991	Robin II: The Joker's Wild mini-series	
46	November 1991	The Lobo Paramilitary Christmas Special one-shot	
47	December 1991	Batman Versus Predator mini-series, Batman: Master of the Future one-shot, Batman: Blind Justice trade paperback, and DC Comics hologram buttons	
48	January 1992	Batman: Gotham Nights mini-series	
49	February 1992	New creative teams on Justice League America and Justice League Europe, Justice League Spectacular one-shot, and other Justice League-related releases	
50	May 1992	Lobo's Back mini-series	
51	June 1992	Green Lantern vol. 3 #25 (Hal Jordan versus Guy Gardner), Green Lantern Corps Quarterly and Green Lantern: Mosaic ongoing series, and other Green Lantern-related releases	
52	July 1992	Batman: Shadow of the Bat ongoing series and other Batman-related releases	
53	August 1992	Batman Returns Movie Adaptation one-shot	
54	September 1992	Team Titans ongoing series	
55	October 1992	Batman: Sword of Azrael mini-series	
56	November 1992	Green Lantern: Ganthet's Tale one-shot	
57	December 1992	Robin III: Cry of the Huntress mini-series	
58	January 1993	Superman vol. 2 #75 ("The Death of Superman")	
59	February 1993	Batman: Seduction of the Gun one-shot	
60	March 1993	The Legacy of Superman one-shot	First DC/Vertigo flip book
60	March 1993	Vertigo imprint launches	First DC/Vertigo flip book
61	April 1993	Milestone Media debuts (Hardware and Blood Syndicate ongoing series)	
61	April 1993	Sandman Mystery Theatre ongoing series	
62	May 1993	The Atom Special one-shot	
62	May 1993	Kid Eternity vol. 2 ongoing series	
63	June 1993	Adventures of Superman #500 (Superman returns from the dead) and the "Reign of the Supermen!" storyline	
63	June 1993	The Sandman vol. 2 #50 (anniversary issue)	
64	July 1993	"Bloodlines" crossover	
64	July 1993	Skin Graft: The Adventures of a Tattooed Man mini-series	
65	August 1993	Catwoman vol. 2 ongoing series	
65	August 1993	Jonah Hex: Two-Gun Mojo mini-series	
66	September 1993	Hawkman vol. 3 ongoing series	
66	September 1993	Vertigo's "Second Wave" (Vertigo-related releases and improvements to existing titles)	
67	October 1993	Batman #500 (conclusion of the "Knightfall" storyline)	
67	October 1993	Hellblazer Special one-shot	
68	November 1993	Robin vol. 2 ongoing series, plus the Robin: Tragedy and Triumph trade paperback	
68	November 1993	The Sandman: Fables & Reflections hardcover	
69	December 1993	Lobo vol. 2 ongoing series, plus the Lobo standup and Lobo: Smokin'! poster	
69	December 1993	"The Children's Crusade" crossover	
70	January 1994	"Shadow War" crossover	
70	January 1994	Death: The High Cost of Living hardcover, Death Gallery one-shot, Death T-shirt, and Death watch	
71	February 1994	Superboy vol. 3 and Steel ongoing series, Supergirl vol. 3 and Legends of the World's Finest mini-series, and other Superman-related releases	
71	February 1994	The Sandman vol. 2 #57 (beginning of "The Kindly Ones" storyline) and The Sandman: Fables & Reflections trade paperback	
72	March 1994	The Power of Shazam! graphic novel	
72	March 1994	Swamp Thing vol. 2 #140 (writing team of Grant Morrison and Mark Millar begins)	
73	April 1994	Green Lantern vol. 3 #51 (Kyle Rayner becomes Green Lantern)	
73	April 1994	The Mystery Play graphic novel	
74	May 1994	Batman/Spawn: War Devil one-shot	
74	May 1994	The Books of Magic vol. 2 ongoing series	
75	June 1994	Superman/Doomsday: Hunter/Prey mini-series	
75	June 1994	Witchcraft mini-series	
76	July 1994	"Worlds Collide" crossover	
76	July 1994	The Heart of the Beast graphic novel	
77	August 1994	"KnightsEnd" storyline	
77	August 1994	Vamps mini-series	
78	September 1994	Zero Hour: Crisis in Time! mini-series and crossover	
78	September 1994	The Invisibles ongoing series	
79	October 1994	Zero Month (every DC title gets a #0 issue)	
79	October 1994	The Sandman: A Gallery of Dreams one-shot	
80	November 1994	Starman vol. 2 ongoing series	
80	November 1994	Shadows Fall mini-series	
81	December 1994	Batman Versus Predator II: Bloodmatch mini-series	
81	December 1994	The Tragical Comedy or Comical Tragedy of Mr. Punch graphic novel	
82	January 1995	Batman: Bloodstorm graphic novel	
82	January 1995	Paradox Press imprint launches	
83	February 1995	Azrael ongoing series	
83	February 1995	Tainted one-shot	
84	March 1995	The Power of Shazam! ongoing series	
84	March 1995	Jonah Hex: Riders of the Worm and Such mini-series	
85	April 1995	Flash vol. 2 #100 (anniversary issue)	
85	April 1995	Preacher ongoing series	
86	May 1995	Superman vol. 2 #100 ("The Death of Clark Kent" storyline)	
86	May 1995	Tank Girl Movie Adaptation one-shot	
Special 1	1995		
87	June 1995	Justice League America #100 (anniversary issue)	
87	June 1995	Tank Girl: The Odyssey mini-series	
88	July 1995	Sovereign Seven ongoing series	
88	July 1995	Chiaroscuro: The Private Lives of Leonardo da Vinci maxi-series	
89	August 1995	Batman Forever Movie Adaptation one-shot and other Batman-related releases	
89	August 1995	The Sandman vol. 2 #70 ("The Wake" storyline)	
90	September 1995	Wonder Woman vol. 2 #101 (John Byrne takes over as writer/artist)	
90	September 1995	Sandman Midnight Theatre one-shot	
91	October 1995	Batman: Man-Bat mini-series	
91	October 1995	Stuck Rubber Baby graphic novel	
92	November 1995	Underworld Unleashed mini-series and crossover	
92	November 1995	The Tragical Comedy or Comical Tragedy of Mr. Punch softcover	
1997 Special	1997		

=== 2016 ===
Issue Number	Date	Cover Story	Notes
1	Winter 2017	Justice League vs. Suicide Squad mini-series	

== See also ==
- Comic Shop News
- Marvel Age
