= Marvel No-Prize =

Satirical award distributed by Marvel Comics

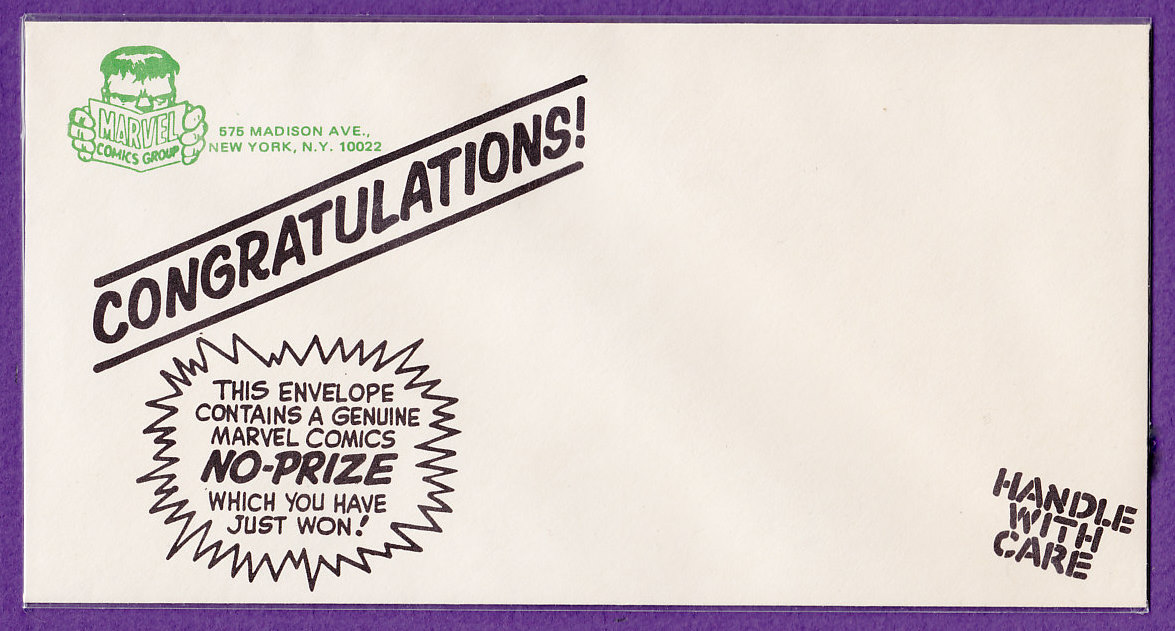
- An official Marvel No-Prize envelope from the 1960s
- Type: Booby prize
- Awarded for: Identifying continuity errors in comics
- Description: Empty envelope
- Presented by: Marvel Comics

The Marvel No-Prize is a fake or satirical award given out by Marvel Comics to readers. Originally for those who spotted continuity errors in the comics, the current "No-Prizes" are given out for charitable works or other types of "meritorious service to the cause of Marveldom". As the No-Prize evolved, it was distinguished by its role in explaining away potential continuity errors. Initially awarded simply for identifying such errors, a No-Prize was later given only when a reader successfully explained why the continuity error was not an error at all.

== History ==
=== Predecessors and antecedents of the No-Prize ===
The No-Prize was inspired by the policies of many other comic book publishers of the early 1960s—namely, that if a fan found a continuity error in a comic and wrote a letter to the publisher of the comic, the fan would receive a prize of cash, free comics, or even original artwork.

In a similar vein, in 1962, Marvel Comics writer/editor Stan Lee promised, in the letters page of Fantastic Four #4, that he would send five dollars to a reader who would write in with the best explanation for a continuity error from an earlier issue. When the Marvel offices were inundated with suggestions, Lee awarded the $5 to the first letter received, and printed the names of all the other correspondents who had sent in good answers.

=== The first No-Prizes ===
This sort of interaction with the readers continued, with contests and polls being run on the Fantastic Four letters page for the next few years. In the letters page for issue #22, featuring a contest for which reader had the largest comics collection, Lee announced that "no prizes" would be given ("because we're cheapskates!"). The winner of the contest was announced in issue #25, where it was officially dubbed a "No-Prize."

In Fantastic Four #26, Lee ran a contest asking readers to send in their definition of what "the Marvel Age of Comics" really meant. As part of the letter, Lee wrote "there will be no prizes, and therefore, no losers". Originally, the "prize" was simply Lee publishing the letter and informing the letter-writer that they had won a No-Prize, which was actually nothing.

Other No-Prize contests asked readers questions and rewarded the most creative responses. One example asked readers for proof of whether the Sub-Mariner was a mutant or not (it has since been firmly established in continuity that the Sub-Mariner is a mutant). Winners had their letters printed, along with Lee congratulating them on winning a No-Prize.

=== For "meritorious service" ===
The No-Prize had been intended as a reminder to Marvel readers to "lighten up" and read comics for pleasure; to not write in for prizes, but instead for the thrill of being recognized for their efforts. Letters soon multiplied, however, as fans wrote in looking for errors in every comic they could, and suddenly the non-existent prize was in high demand. In response, Lee took on a new approach. Since other comic companies had given out prizes for pointing out oversights and continuity errors in their books, Lee began awarding No-Prizes in such situations only "to the fan who could explain a seemingly unexplainable situation." The reader who inspired this version of the No-Prize was a teenage George R. R. Martin, later a successful novelist.

The No-Prize soon evolved into a reward to those who performed "meritorious service to the cause of Marveldom": readers who first spotted a mistake, or came up with a plausible way to explain a mistake others spotted, or made some great suggestion or performed a service for Marvel in general.

=== No-Prize distribution ===
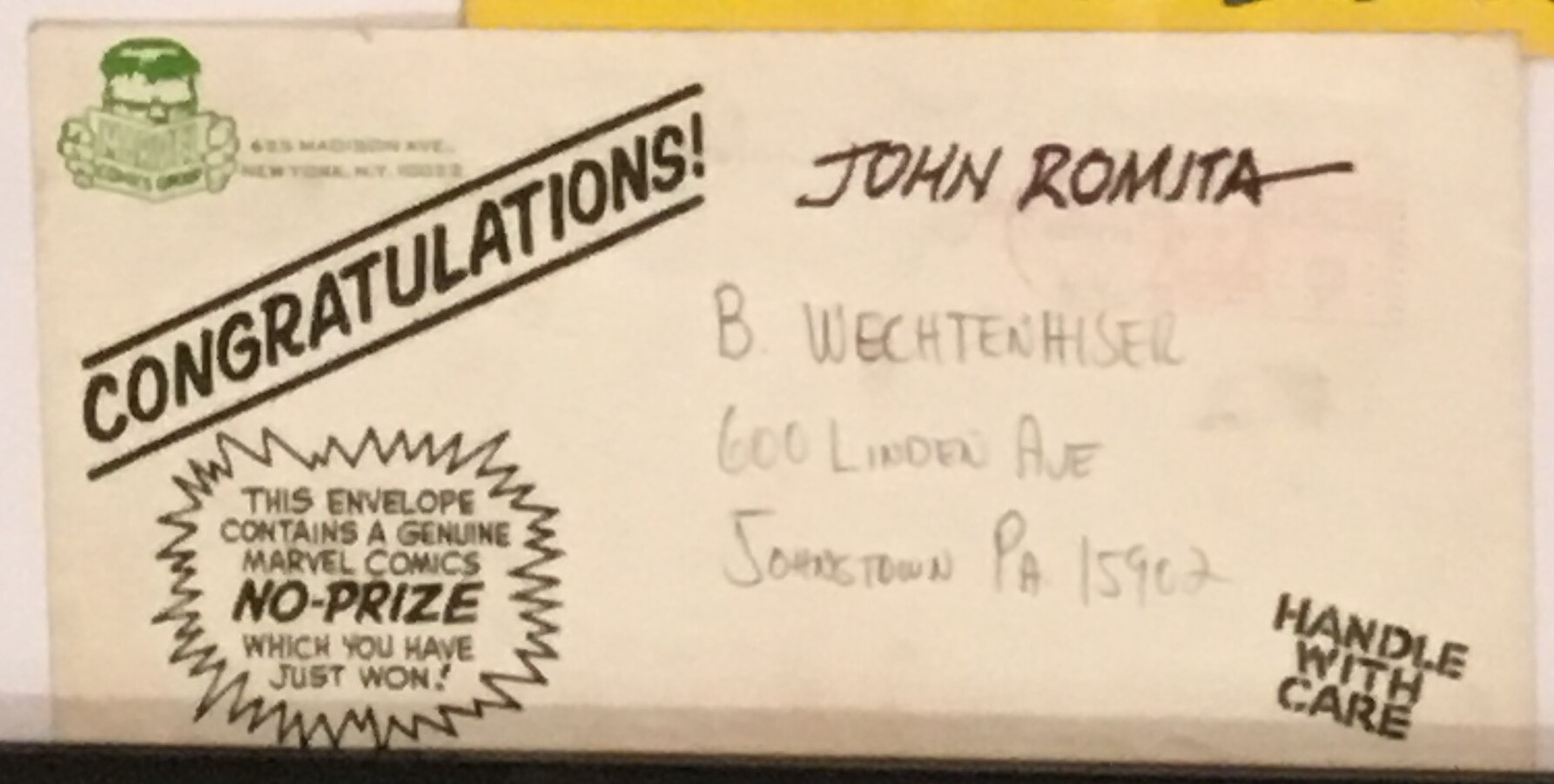
A No-Prize from 1972, autographed by John Romita Sr. in 2019

As time went by, some recipients of the "award" began to write Lee and ask why they had not received an actual prize. In response, in 1967 Lee began mailing No-Prize-winners pre-printed empty envelopes that said "Congratulations, this envelope contains a genuine Marvel Comics No-Prize which you have just won!" However, some uncomprehending fans wrote back asking where their prize was, even going so far as to suggest their prize had fallen out of the envelope.

=== Confusion and decline ===
After Lee stepped down as Marvel editor-in-chief in 1972 (becoming Marvel's publisher), Marvel's various editors, who were left in charge of dispensing No-Prizes, developed differing policies toward awarding them. By 1986, these policies ranged from Ralph Macchio's practice of giving them away to anyone who wrote a letter asking for one to Mike Higgins' policy of not awarding them at all. As reported in Iron Man #213 (Dec. 1986), these were the various editors' policies:

- Ann Nocenti (X-Men): "The spirit of the No-Prize is not just to complain and nitpick but to offer an exciting solution. Do that and you will get one from me."
- Carl Potts (Alpha Flight and Power Pack): "If someone points out a major story problem I'm not aware of and solves it to my satisfaction, I'll award a No-Prize. I give away very few."
- Mike Higgins (Star Brand): "No No-Prizes for New Universe no-no's no way!"
- Larry Hama (Conan, G.I. Joe): "No one writes in for them in the Conan books so we don't award them. On G.I. Joe, which I write, I give them to people who get me out of jams if they are very ingenious about it."
- Archie Goodwin (Epic): "We acknowledge our mistakes in print, but Epic Comics doesn't award No-Prizes."
- Bob Budiansky (Secret Wars II): "If someone finds a clever enough explanation for what seems to be a mistake, I'll send them a No-Prize."
- Bob Harras (The Incredible Hulk, X-Factor): "My policy is if a certain mistake wouldn't have bothered me when I was a kid, it's not worth a No-Prize. But if someone does really help us out, I'll send them one."
- Don Daley (Captain America): "First I place a temporal statute of limitations on No-Prize mistakes. If the mistake is more than six issues old, it doesn't qualify anymore. Second, I only give them out for things that count, not trivial nitpicking and faultfinding. Third, the explanation should not only be logical but emotionally appealing. I don't award many of them."
- James Owsley (Spider-Man): "We only mail them out to people who send us the best possible explanations for important mistakes. Panels where someone's shirt is colored wrong do not count. We send out the No-Prize envelopes to everyone who gets the same best answer, and sometimes will send out postcards to runners-up who come close."
- Ralph Macchio (Daredevil): "The No-Prize is an honored Marvel tradition. Of course I give them away—for just about any old stupid thing. I have a million of them."

A typical mid-1980s attempt at a No-Prize comes from the letters page of The Incredible Hulk #324 (Oct. 1986), in response to Hulk #321: ". . . On page 12, panel 5, Wonder Man's glasses are knocked off, but in following panels on the next page, he has them on. He didn't have enough time to get them after they fell off, and Hawkeye's explosive arrow probably would have destroyed them when it detonated on the Hulk. Never fear, though. I have the solution — while flying down to help Hawkeye, Wonder Man pulled out an extra pair he carries in case of just such emergencies." (Editor Bob Harras awarded the writer a No-Prize.)

Editor Mark Gruenwald believed the quest for No-Prizes negatively impacted the quality of letters sent to comic book letter columns, as readers were becoming more focused on nitpicking and pointing out errors than in responding to the comics' stories themselves (he even cited one letter which focused on Captain America's glove being yellow in one panel, instead of the correct color red). Gruenwald then temporarily adopted a new policy, which was to award No-Prizes to readers who not only pointed out an error but also devised a clever explanation as to why it was not really an error (Gruenwald was also known for awarding the "fred-prize" to readers of Captain America). But in 1986, still believing that the quest for No-Prizes was degrading the quality of reader communication, Gruenwald informed the public that his office would no longer award No-Prizes at all.

In January 1989, Marvel was purchased by Ronald Perelman. One of the first casualties of the new financial belt-tightening was the No-Prize, considered in one memo to be "a silly, expensive extravagance to mail out".

=== Early 1990s reinstatement ===
In 1991, then-Marvel editor-in-chief Tom DeFalco reinstated the No-Prize, introducing the "meritorious service to Marvel above and beyond the call of duty" criteria:

What constitutes 'meritorious service'? Lots of things could! Like sending a box of comics to the children's wing of a hospital. Or compiling a chronological cross-title index to a character's appearance. Or coming up with an explanation for a major discontinuity or discrepancy. So if you think spotting a misspelled word or miscolored boot is worth a No-Prize, you're living in the wrong decade! This policy is in effect for all Marvel titles whose editors award No-Prizes.

In the late 1990s, Stan Lee returned to writing the Bullpen Bulletins column. He would answer fan questions, and anyone whose question was used would receive a physical No-Prize.

No-Prizes were still irregularly offered for any number of reasons. In one instance, for example, the first reader to name the last story Stan Lee wrote before becoming Marvel's publisher was promised a No-Prize.

=== Digital No-Prize ===
On July 31, 2006, Marvel executive editor Tom Brevoort instituted the digital No-Prize to be awarded for "meritorious service to Marveldom". The first was awarded on August 12, 2006, to a group of Marvel fans who donated a large number of comics to U.S. service members stationed in Iraq.

=== 2023 variants ===
In February 2023, Marvel released three variant covers featuring No-Prize envelopes. The covers were printed on Amazing Spider-Man #19, Black Panther #14, and Hulk #12.

== No-Prize book ==
In late 1982 (cover dated January 1983), Marvel published a humorous one-shot comic featuring some of their most notorious goofs. Subtitled "Mighty Marvel's Most Massive Mistakes", the book was organized and spearheaded by Jim Owsley and had a cover which was deliberately printed upside-down. In the comic's story Lee, with the help of artists Bob Camp and Vince Colletta, exposes and pokes fun at typos, misspellings and other errors.

== See also ==
- Bullpen Bulletins
- Comic book letter column
- Merry Marvel Marching Society
- Blooper
