= Bullpen Bulletins =

Marvel Comics news and information page

The first official "Marvel Bullpen Bulletins" page, from The Amazing Spider-Man #31 (Dec. 1965).

"Bullpen Bulletins" (originally titled "Marvel Bullpen Bulletins") was the news and information page that appeared in most regular monthly comic books from Marvel Comics. In various incarnations from its inception in 1965 until its demise in 2001, it included previews of upcoming Marvel publications (the "Mighty Marvel Checklist"), profiles of Marvel staff members, and a monthly column written by Stan Lee known as "Stan's Soapbox" or "Stan Lee's Soapbox".

With "Bullpen Bulletins", Lee created the friendly, chatty editorial voice of Marvel Comics — "a style that could be characterized as High Hipster — two parts Lord Buckley, one part Austin Powers", putting "himself on a first-name basis with the readership at a time when the rival DC editors generally came across... as... stodgy adults".

The "Bullpen Bulletins" page was where Lee rhapsodized about the Marvel "bullpen", the stable of in-house creators who produced the company's comics. He often bestowed colorful sobriquets on Marvel staffers and creators; nicknames such as Stan "The Man" Lee and Jack "King" Kirby permeated into mass culture. The fictional Marvel staffer Irving Forbush also appeared regularly — as the butt of Lee's humor. Similarly, phrases like "Excelsior!", "'Nuff said", "True Believer", and "Make Mine Marvel", as well as other company mainstays like the No-Prize, were popularized there as well.

Lee often used "Marvel Bullpen Bulletins" and "Stan's Soapbox" to needle other comic book publishers, which he referred to as the "Distinguished Competition" (i.e., DC) or, more disparagingly, "Brand Echh". "Brand Echh" was a play on an advertising convention of the time, in which a competitor's product was not referred to by name, but simply as "Brand X".

== Publication history ==
=== Origins, 1965–1972 ===
The tone of "Bullpen Bulletins" was inspired by a series of boys' adventure books Lee read as a child. Penned by Leo Edwards, the end of each Jerry Todd book had the unusual feature of printed letters from readers and the author's warm, informal responses to them. As Lee said in a 1992 interview: "I don't know if I consciously remembered those books when I set out to do the Bullpen page years later, or if I was unconsciously influenced and only afterwards realized where I got the idea from. I do know that talking to the readers informally and indirectly seemed like the natural thing to do".

What became "Bullpen Bulletins" started out as part of the letters section of Marvel's flagship title Fantastic Four. This two-page section often concluded with a "Special Announcements Section" where Lee responded to general letters and promoted other Marvel titles. "The Mighty Marvel Checklist" appeared for the first time — embedded in the Special Announcements Section — in Fantastic Four #33 (Dec. 1964).

A separate "The Merry Marvel Bullpen Page" appeared in comics cover-dated July and August 1965, but the checklist and special announcements were still on the letters pages. Finally, the first stand-alone "Marvel Bullpen Bulletins" page, complete with checklist and special announcements, debuted in the issues cover-dated December 1965.

For many years, starting around this time, each edition of "Bullpen Bulletins" included an alliterative subtitle. The first one read "More mirthful, monumental, mind-staggering memoranda from your Marvel madmen!" Other memorable subtitles include "A Profound Potpourri of Perplexing Pronouncements and Preposterous Philosophy, all Portending Practically Nothing!", and "A Riotous Roundup of Ridiculous Rumors and Rabelaisian Reports". Editor Archie Goodwin eliminated the alliterative subtitle with "Zounds! A Zealful Zetetic of Zestful Zanies to Zap the Zeitgeist", which ran in Marvel Comics cover-dated June 1977.

"Stan's Soapbox" first appeared in the "Marvel Bullpen Bulletins" of June 1967. Later on, when filling in for Lee in the space that was originally slotted for "Stan's Soapbox", Thomas's column would be titled "Roy's Rostrum".

=== Post-Lee: Roy Thomas through Archie Goodwin, 1972–1978 ===
After Stan Lee stepped down as editor-in-chief in 1972, "Marvel Bullpen Bulletins" was put together (with the exception of "Stan's Soapbox", which Lee continued to write on a regular basis) by his successors, including Roy Thomas (1972–1974), Archie Goodwin (1976–1978), and Jim Shooter (1978–1987).

By 1973, much of the space formerly used in the "Bullpen Bulletins" page for inside info and Bullpen gossip had been taken over by the checklist and special announcements. From at least 1974–1975, Marvel ran a "Bullpen Bonus Page", which hosted the checklist, fan page information, and announcements; freeing up the original "Bullpen Bulletins" page for the cherished "inside info" traditionally featured in that spot. For the most part during these years, however, the page retained the tone and flavor of when Lee edited it.

=== The Shooter years, 1978–1987 ===
During Jim Shooter's tenure as editor-in-chief, "Bullpen Bulletins" underwent various format changes. An abbreviated checklist returned, the gossipy "Items" came and went, and except for one month in 1981, the page disappeared entirely from Marvel's books. When it returned in issues cover-dated January 1982, the page was missing the checklist and "Stan's Soapbox", and was for the first time actually signed by its author: Shooter. Shooter rededicated the page on its return, promising readers that:

"Soapbox Specials" which will appear on this page from time to time in the future — whenever [Stan Lee]'s got some big news to announce and he can spare ten minutes to write! ...We'll also present on this page occasional announcements, gossip, news, and nonsense from Al Milgrom, Denny O'Neil, Jim Salicrup, and Louise Jones, pertaining to the particular comics and magazines they edit. You'll also hear from Larry Hama about CRAZY! doings... and once in a while Archie Goodwin, Editorial Director of EPIC ILLUSTRATED, will enlighten us all about the latest goings on in his domain... In between all those special things, I'll be giving you the general lowdown on things Marvel-ous. I'm not Stan Lee, but as Editor-in-Chief, I am right here in the middle of things, and I can fill you in on most of the important current events. And I will.

Throughout the rest of his tenure, Shooter gradually did away with the traditional tone of the page — for instance, eliminating the colorful nicknames for Marvel staffers — in favor of a new idiosyncratic voice where Shooter wrote in the first person and even signed his name. New innovations included guest columns written by various freelancers, a Hype Box, and tongue-in-cheek photo features.

In the early 1980s, Shooter also created a separate page, titled "Bullpen Bulletins Specials", which ran only in Marvel's direct market titles Moon Knight, Ka-Zar, and Micronauts. These "Bullpen Bulletins Specials" featured Shooter's interviews with various Marvel creative talents.

In 1983, Shooter launched Marvel Age, which was essentially a comic book-length version of "Bullpen Bulletins", filled with company news, creator interviews, and previews of upcoming books.

By the end of Shooter's tenure, "Bullpen Bulletins" contained very little original material, as it was mostly filled with design elements and an abbreviated Marvel Comics checklist. "Stan's Soapbox" had been revived in the pages of Marvel Age (beginning with issue #41). After Shooter's departure from the company (corresponding with comics cover-dated February 1987), there were no "Bullpen Bulletins" for three months.

=== Mark Gruenwald, 1987–1996 ===
Tom DeFalco took over Marvel's editorial reins in 1987, and for the first time, someone other than the editor-in-chief was put in charge of "Bullpen Bulletins": writer/editor Mark Gruenwald. During this period, a single-panel comic called "The Bull's Eye" was often featured on the page. Created by Rick Parker and Barry Dutter, "The Bull's Eye" often featured DeFalco, as well as Gruenwald, who was often depicted as a caricature and foil for DeFalco's antics. Other recurring "Bullpen Bulletins" features during Gruenwald's rein included the "Pro File", short Marvel Handbook-style profiles of Marvel staff-members; and the "COOLometer", a light-hearted list of current pop-culture fads. Gruenwald edited "Bullpen Bulletins" until his death of a heart attack in 1996.

=== Demise, 1996–2001 ===
In the late 1990s, Stan Lee returned to writing the Bullpen Bulletins column. Readers were invited to write to Lee with questions, and anyone whose question was chosen to be answered in the column received a Marvel No-Prize.

In 1999, Marvel began running Chris Giarrusso's "Bullpen Bits" strip on the "Bullpen Bulletins" page. Many of the strips featured "Mini-Marvels", cutesy takes on the various Marvel heroes as kids. Marvel discontinued the "Bullpen Bulletins" page in 2001.

== Collected edition ==
In January 2009, Marvel Comics/The Hero Initiative published Stan's Soapbox: The Collection (ISBN 0979760291), a 144-page softcover containing all the "Stan's Soapbox" columns from 1967 to 1980, with commentary from Joe Quesada, Roy Thomas, and many others. The book was also published in a hardcover edition limited to 250 copies.

== Quotes ==
Author Jonathan Lethem:

...a page of Marvel gossip and advertising featured in every issue of every comic, written in a style that could be characterized as High Hipster — two parts Lord Buckley, one part Austin Powers. Stan Lee was a writer gone Barnum, who'd abandoned new work in favor of rah-rah moguldom. He was Marvel's media liaison and their own biggest in-house fan, a schmoozer.

Writer Mark Evanier:

I... really liked the friendly editorial 'voice' [Lee] established in his letter columns, house ads and especially in the 'Bullpen Bulletins'. He put himself on a first-name basis with the readership at a time when the rival DC editors generally came across not only as adults but stodgy adults. He simultaneously bragged about the greatness of Marvel and expressed such humility that when they screwed up, as they occasionally did, you were willing to cut them a lot of slack.

== The actual Marvel bullpen ==
A map of the Marvel Comics offices circa 1982, artwork by Bob Camp.

In 1982, in an edition of "Bullpen Bulletins", then Marvel editor-in-chief Jim Shooter defined and described the Marvel Bullpen:

[I]n the old days, virtually every comics company had a big room where all the artists and writers sat together, creating their works of four-color wonder. Creative folks generally being the garrulous sort, typically, quite a bit of 'bull' got tossed around these legendary rooms, so the nickname 'bullpen' was a natural.... At any rate, these days, most comics artists and writers prefer to work in their own studios, but, still, here at Marvel, we have a big room, a production bullpen, where all of our art/production people work doing our paste-ups, lettering corrections, art corrections, and such — and even though the editorial folks are bunched in small offices off to the sides we still refer to the whole shebang as the Marvel Bullpen. It's a tradition dating back to the days when we actually were a one-room operation!

== See also ==
- Merry Marvel Marching Society
- Comic book letter column
- List of Marvel Comics nicknames
- Marvel Age
- Not Brand Echh
- Daily Planet (DC Comics house advertisement)
