= Edward Edson Lee =

American novelist

- Born: September 2, 1884; Meriden, Illinois, United States
- Died: September 28, 1944 (aged 60); Rockford, Illinois, US
- Occupation: Novelist
- Writing career
- Pen name: Leo Edwards
- Genre: Young adult adventure fiction
- Notable works: Jerry Todd series, Poppy Ott series, Trigger Berg series, Andy Blake series, Tuffy Bean series

Edward Edson Lee (September 2, 1884 – September 28, 1944), who wrote under the pen name of Leo Edwards, was a popular children's literature author in the 1920s and 1930s.

== Biography ==
Lee had a difficult childhood, dropping out of school to go to work in his early teens. He got his start as a writer writing serialized stories, most notably in The American Boy magazine. His first book, Andy Blake in Advertising, was published in 1922 (reprinted in 1928 as the first volume in the Andy Blake series).

He wrote five series of books: the Jerry Todd series of sixteen books; the Poppy Ott series of eleven books; the Trigger Berg series of four books; the Andy Blake series of four books; and the Tuffy Bean series of four books. All of the series were interrelated in some way; the Todd and Ott stories took place in the town of Tutter, Illinois, a fictional town modeled on the town of Utica, which Lee experienced in his childhood. The supporting characters in the Todd and Ott books — "Red" Meyers, "Scoop" Ellery, and "Peg" Shaw — were real boys that Lee befriended around the time he began writing the stories while living in Shelby, Ohio.

Edward Edson Lee is buried in Beloit, Wisconsin.

== Legacy ==
Initially forgotten after his death, Lee's books (most of them graced by the gaudy and idiosyncratic illustrations of Bert Salg) have become highly valued by juvenile book collectors.

The end of each Jerry Todd book had the unusual feature of printed letters from readers and Lee's warm, informal responses to them. This tradition — and intimate tone — was later imitated by Marvel Comics editor/publisher Stan Lee (no relation) in the "Marvel Bullpen Bulletins" pages printed in the pages of all Marvel comics.

The 1990s power pop band Cockeyed Ghost took its name from one of Edwards' more obscure books, Trigger Berg and the Cock-Eyed Ghost.

In his autobiography, "Where's the Rest of Me?" Ronald Reagan wrote that, growing up in Tampico, Illinois, he had a boyhood much like Jerry Todd.

== List of works ==
=== Andy Blake series ===
1. Andy Blake (originally Andy Blake in Advertising) - 1922, republished 1928
2. Andy Blake's Comet Coaster - 1928
3. Andy Blake's Secret Service - 1929
4. Andy Blake and the Pot of Gold - 1930

=== Jerry Todd series ===
1. Jerry Todd and the Whispering Mummy - 1923
2. Jerry Todd and the Rose-Colored Cat - 1924
3. Jerry Todd and the Oak Island Treasure - 1925
4. Jerry Todd and the Waltzing Hen - 1924
5. Jerry Todd and the Talking Frog - 1925
6. Jerry Todd and the Purring Egg - 1925
7. Jerry Todd in the Whispering Cave - 1927
8. Jerry Todd, Pirate - 1928
9. Jerry Todd and the Bob-Tailed Elephant - 1929
10. Jerry Todd, Editor-In-Grief - 1930
11. Jerry Todd, Caveman - 1932
12. Jerry Todd and the Flying Flapdoodle - 1934
13. Jerry Todd and the Buffalo Bill Bathtub - 1936
14. Jerry Todd's Up-The-Ladder Club - 1937
15. Jerry Todd's Poodle Parlor - 1938
16. Jerry Todd's Cuckoo Camp - 1940

=== Poppy Ott series ===
1. Poppy Ott and the Stuttering Parrot - 1926
2. Poppy Ott's Seven-League Stilts - 1926
3. Poppy Ott and the Galloping Snail - 1927
4. Poppy Ott's Pedigreed Pickles - 1927
5. Poppy Ott and the Freckled Goldfish - 1928
6. Poppy Ott and the Tittering Totem - 1929
7. Poppy Ott and the Prancing Pancake - 1930
8. Poppy Ott Hits The Trail - 1933
9. Poppy Ott & Co., Inferior Decorators - 1937
10. The Monkey's Paw - 1938
11. The Hidden Dwarf - 1939

=== Trigger Berg series ===
1. Trigger Berg and the Treasure Tree - 1930
2. Trigger Berg and His 700 Mousetraps - 1930
3. Trigger Berg and the Sacred Pig - 1931
4. Trigger Berg and the Cock-Eyed Ghost - 1933

=== Tuffy Bean series ===
1. Tuffy Bean's Puppy Days - 1931
2. Tuffy Bean's One-Ring Circus - 1931
3. Tuffy Bean At Funny Bone Farm - 1931
4. Tuffy Bean and the Lost Fortune - 1932
