= Neal Pozner =

American art director and writer

- Born: 1955
- Died: June 21, 1994 (aged 38–39)
- Areas: Writer, Editor
- Notable works: DC Comics design director, Group Editor – Creative Services

Neal Pozner (1955 – June 21, 1994), sometimes credited as Neil Pozner, was an American art director, editor, and writer known for his work in the comic book industry. He worked with DC Comics at two points, first as a design director and later as Group Editor, Creative Services until his death.

== Career ==
As a young man, Pozner published a comics fanzine from 1969 to 1972, when he joined CAPA-alpha. He was an active member in CAPA-alpha at least until 1984. He graduated from The Cooper Union.

Before joining DC's staff, Pozner designed the first gay-themed bus ads for New York City as well several posters for Lincoln Center. He also designed record covers for musicians like The Kinks, Jimi Hendrix, George Benson, and Carmen McRae, as well as the Brooklyn Philharmonic Symphony Orchestra. In addition, he designed for CBS/Broadcast Group and was briefly the associate art director of National Lampoon magazine.

Pozner first worked for DC Comics in 1975 when he edited The Amazing World of DC Comics #9 (Nov.–Dec. 1975). A few years later, he designed the front cover for All-New Collectors' Edition #C–62, a tabloid-format book based on the then-upcoming Superman movie. He was subsequently hired as DC's first real production designer.

Pozner wrote the 1986 Aquaman miniseries, as well as designing the character's blue "camouflage" uniform. He was also responsible for incorporating DC Comics characters into a series of AIDS awareness house ads published in the company's comics.

One of Pozner's many tasks as Group Editor, Creative Services, at DC was recruiting new talent. Travis Charest, Gene Ha, Stuart Immonen, and Phil Jimenez are among the pencillers Pozner "discovered."

He also designed posters for Lincoln Center's Speed the Plow and Six Degrees of Separation.

=== Death ===
In the aftermath of Pozner's 1994 death from AIDS complications, artist Phil Jimenez, whom Pozner had hired to work at DC, and with whom Pozner had had a romantic relationship, came out in a tribute to Pozner in the pages of the DC title Tempest.

== Awards and tributes ==
Pozner was recognized with awards from professional associations such as the Royal Society of Arts and the Graphic Arts Technical Foundation. His work was published in Novum Gebrausch Grafik. Pozner received the awards from the American Illustration Annual, the American Institute of Graphic Arts, the Art Directors Club of New York, Print Magazine Regional Design Annual, and the Society of Illustrators.

Comics writer Christopher Priest, who worked with Pozner at DC, based the personality of the character Triumph on Pozner, describing him this way:

Neal was, likely, the sharpest tool in the shed. He dressed better and had better hair than anybody on the floor, veeps included. He was aggressive, passionate about his convictions, willing to stick his neck out for his ideals and for the people he was charged with defending. Neal swung a (political) bat at the major-major Powers That Be at DC on my behalf once, a political move I didn't expect Neal to survive. I marveled at his courage and his dignity, even as some braced against him for being very direct and headstrong and for always being right. Neal, write this down someplace, was always right. He was. At the end of the day, Neal would be proven right. That fact, more than anything else, annoyed many staffers beyond reason. Not that Neal would rub your nose in it — you'd rub your own nose. That's how right he was. [Italics in the original.]

== Bibliography ==
As editor unless otherwise noted

=== DC Comics ===
- The Amazing World of DC Comics #9 (1975)
- Aquaman vol. 2 #1–4 (writer and editor) (1986)
- Batman Gallery #1 (1992)
- Showcase '93 #1–12 (1993)
- Showcase '94 #1–12 (1994)
- Superman Gallery #1 (1993)
