= Forbush Man =

Fictional character

Publication information
- Publisher: Marvel Comics
- First appearance: As Irving Forbush: Snafu #1 (November 1955); As Forbush Man: Not Brand Echh #1 (August 1967)
- Created by: Stan Lee; Jack Kirby

In-story information
- Alter ego: Irving Forbush
- Species: Human
- Place of origin: Earth-665
- Team affiliations: The New Paramounts
- Abilities: Forbush vision (shows the recipient a Hell of their own creation)

Forbush Man (spelled Forbush-Man in his early appearances) is a character appearing in American comic books published by Marvel Comics. Originally the mascot of Marvel's Not Brand Echh, he is the alter-ego of Irving Forbush, a fictional employee of "Marble Comics" (a parody of Marvel). Forbush was devised in 1955 by Marvel editor Stan Lee to refer to an imaginary low-grade colleague who was often the butt of Lee's jokes. In his guise of Forbush-Man, he first appeared in 1967.

According to Marvel Comics' Alternate Universes 2005, Forbush Man is a native of Earth-665 as opposed to Marvel's regular Earth-616.

== Publication history ==
Irving Forbush was introduced in Marvel's short-lived satirical comic book Snafu as a mascot. Forbush was given a line in the magazine's content page where he was credited as Snafu's founder. Another Forbush family member, Melvin, was mentioned in the letters column reference, "Losted [sic] by his cousin, Melvin Forbush". During Snafu's three-issue run, starting in November 1955, the "actual face" of Irving Forbush was often shown, though this face was of someone not named Irving Forbush.

Forbush-Man first appeared on the cover of the first issue of the satirical Not Brand Echh (cover-dated Aug. 1967), drawn by Jack Kirby and featuring Doctor Doom, the Fantastic Four and the Silver Surfer cowering in fear as Forbush Man approaches. Forbush-Man is a wannabe superhero with no superpowers who wears a costume comprising red long johns with the letter F on the front, black galoshes and a cooking pot with eye-holes on his head.

Forbush-Man's first major appearance was in the lead story of Not Brand Echh #5 (December 1967): "The Origin of Forbush-Man", which was "conceived, created and cluttered-up" by Lee and Kirby. In this story, Forbush-Man's secret identity is revealed as Irving Forbush, the fictitious office gofer at Marble Comics. The character has a shrewish maiden aunt (Auntie Mayhem) who is indirectly responsible for her nephew becoming a superhero: in a fit of pique, she slams the fabled cooking pot over Irving's head, inadvertently providing him with the disguise he'd been looking for. The fictional October 13, 1939, edition of the Daily Bugle claims an "Irving Forbush" was born on Friday the 13th, his parents Stan and Jacqueline wanting a daughter instead. Like his better-known Marvel contemporaries, Forbush-Man triumphs over a number of super powered adversaries, starting with 'The Juggernut' in Not Brand Echh #5. All of his victories are purely accidental; lacking superhuman powers, dumb luck plays a major role in all his adventures.

Forbush-Man's next appearance came in Not Brand Echh #8 (June 1968), when he applies for membership with the Avengers parody the Revengers, the S.H.I.E.L.D. parody S.H.E.E.S.H, and finally the X-Men parody The Echhs-Men. His third major appearance came in Not Brand Echh #13 (May 1969, the comic's final issue), which finds him in a loose parody of Silver Surfer #5 (April 1969). In the final two panels, Stan Lee appears as Marble Comics' "Fearless Leader".

=== Continued references ===
On page 3 of Fantastic Four Annual #3 (1965) as the crowd gathers for the wedding of Reed Richards and Sue Storm, chants of "We Want Irving Forbush, We Want Irving Forbush" are seen in the background.

He is mentioned by Spider-Man on page 15 of The Amazing Spider-Man #35 (April 1966). When Molten Man says nobody would be able to stop him after defeating Spider-Man, the latter remarks, "There's always Irving Forbush."

In the 1978 instructional paperback How To Draw Comics The Marvel Way, Chapter Five focuses on drawing a humanoid figure. The introduction states, "...Most anyone can draw a stick figure. (Even Irving Forbush!)"

In the early 1990s, when Comics Buyer's Guide begin their annual fan awards, Marvel came up with its own award for assistant editors as they were ineligible for the CBG awards. Some ballots, which appeared on Marvel's letters pages, listed Forbush as a choice for top assistant editor.

=== Later appearances ===
During the 1980s and 1990s, Forbush Man became the mascot of the Marvel Age news magazine. He also was a main cast member in What The--?!, a satirical ensemble book. In 1993, Forbush Man was killed fighting Dumsday in a parody of DC Comics' "The Death of Superman".

Forbush Man appears in the 2006 series Nextwave: Agents of H.A.T.E. as a member of "The New Paramounts", a team consisting of Not Brand Echh characters. He is later killed by Tabitha Smith after failing to control her mind.

Forbush Man appears in the 2010 one-shot Captain America: Who Won't Wield the Shield. He is killed while defending Marvel Comics employees from critics who believe that they have made comics too dark, but soon returns as a zombie.

== Powers and abilities ==
The original Forbush Man had no superpowers. The Forbush Man who appeared in Nextwave can project deadly hallucinations into the minds of others, with this power normally being blocked by his helmet.

== Other versions ==
=== Amalgam Universe ===
During the DC/Marvel Amalgam Universe crossover, Irving Forbush was fused with DC's AL to form Al Forbush, proprietor of Lobo the Duck's favorite diner in the series' parody installment. He wears Forbush Man's trademark cooking pot with eye holes on his head.

=== Earth-616 ===
A version of Irving Forbush appears on Earth-616. He was born on February 13, 1939 to Stan and Jacqueline Forbush. Years later, Irving Forbush is shown to work as an funeral director.

=== Marvel Adventures ===
In the "Marvel Adventures" reality, Irving Forbus was a mathlete who got hired at Van Dyne Tech.

=== Marvel Apes ===
In the "Marvel Apes" reality, there was a monkey version of Forbush Man called Forbush Ape.

=== Ultimate Universe ===
An alternate universe version of Forbush Man appears in The Ultimates. He is among the prisoners of H.A.N.D. until Wasp frees him.

== In other media ==
=== Television ===
Irving Forbush makes non-speaking cameo appearances in photographs depicted in the Marvel Cinematic Universe series Daredevil, Jessica Jones, Luke Cage, Iron Fist, The Defenders, and The Punisher, portrayed by Stan Lee. This version is a police captain and attorney.

=== Video games ===
Forbush Man appears as a playable character in Lego Marvel Super Heroes 2.
