= Fred Hembeck =

American cartoonist (born 1953)

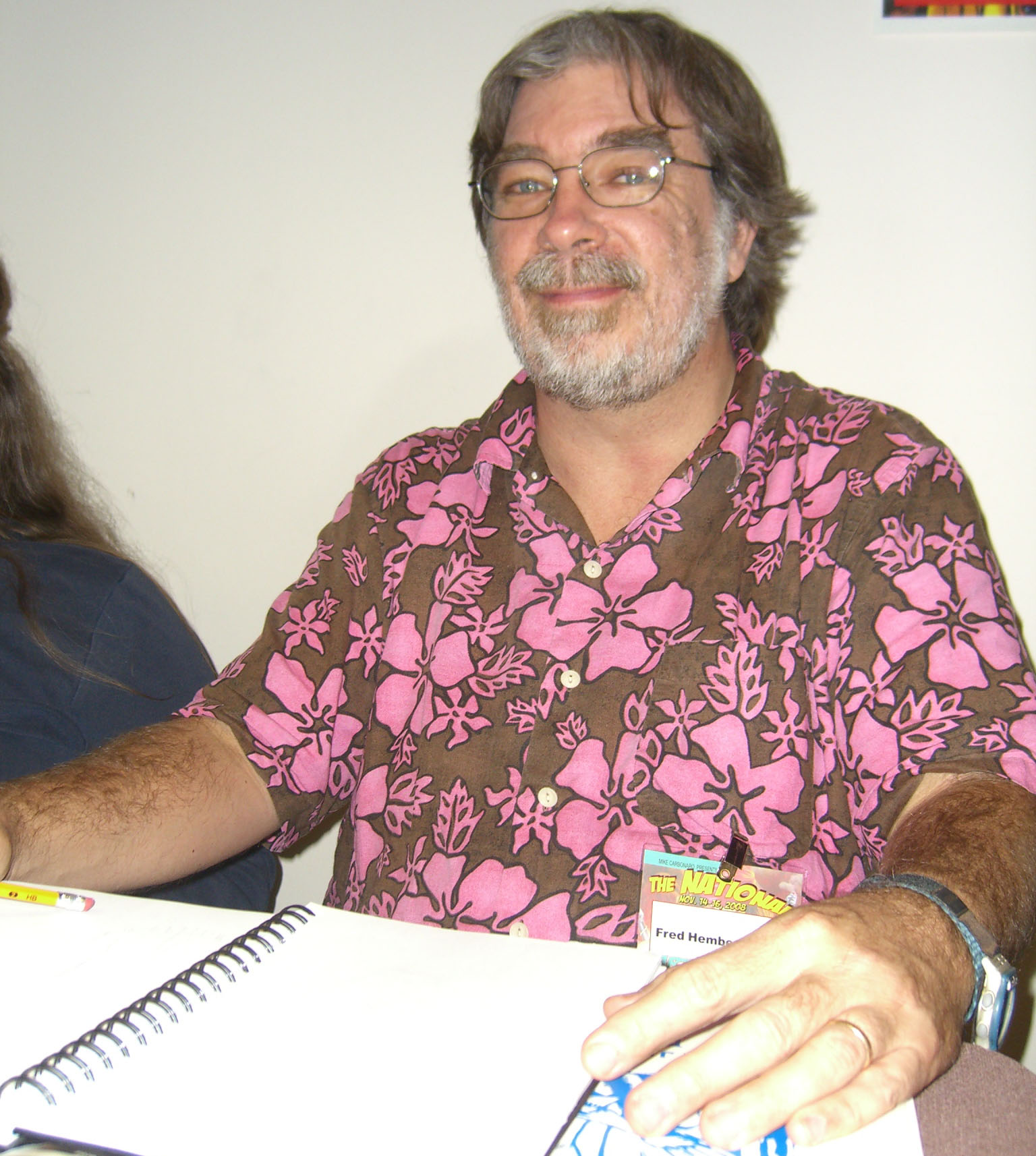
- Fred Hembeck at the November 2008; Big Apple Con in Manhattan
- Born: Frederick George Hembeck; January 30, 1953 (age 73) Yaphank, New York, US
- Areas: Cartoonist, Writer, Penciller
- Notable works: "Dateline:@#$%", Dial H for Hembeck, Fantastic Four Roast, Fred Hembeck Destroys the Marvel Universe
- Awards: Comics Buyer's Guide Fan Awards "Favorite Fan Artist," 1982–1984

Fred Hembeck (born January 30, 1953) is an American cartoonist best known for his parodies of characters from major American comic book publishers. His work has frequently been published by the firms whose characters he spoofs. His characters are always drawn with curlicues at the elbows and knees. He often portrays himself as a character in his own work, in the role of "interviewer" of various comic book characters. Interviewer Daniel Best has said of his work, "If you take your comic books seriously, and think that those characters are real, then you're probably not a fan of Hembeck."

== Early life ==
Hembeck was born January 30, 1953. He grew up in Yaphank, Long Island.

== Career ==
The cover from Hembeck's Bah, Hembeck (1980)

Fresh out of college, and failing to get work as a traditional comic book artist, Hembeck developed a unique artistic style based on the version of himself he used to write illustrated letters to his college friends. Hembeck used this character to conduct comedic "interviews" with Spider-Man and The Flash, which he sent to the leading fan publication of the day, The Buyer's Guide for Comic Fandom (later known as the Comics Buyer's Guide). Much to his surprise, the submissions were published, and Hembeck's strip, called "Dateline: @!!?#", became a popular feature. The "best" of these strips were published in Hembeck: The Best of Dateline: @!!?#, put out by Eclipse Comics in 1979 and reprinted by FantaCo Enterprises in 1980.

From 1979 to 1981, Hembeck wrote and drew a one-tier, multi-panel comic strip that appeared in the Daily Planet page of DC comic books. (The Daily Planet featured news on current and upcoming DC comics and answers to reader questions.)

From 1980 to 1983, FantaCo produced a series of black-and-white magazine-format books featuring Hembeck's stories and strips. Hembeck also contributed humor pieces to other FantaCo titles, including Smilin’ Ed, the Chronicles series, Gates of Eden, and Alien Encounters. Hembeck wrote and laid out the artwork for Fantastic Four Roast #1 (May 1982), a one-shot which commemorated the 20th anniversary of the Fantastic Four series.

=== Marvel Age and Brother Voodoo ===
Hembeck was especially visible in the 1980s when his strips appeared regularly in Marvel Age, a Marvel Comics promotional magazine. Because Hembeck has a particular fascination with the minor Marvel Comics character Brother Voodoo, he regularly featured the character in the cartoons he drew each month in Marvel Age, generally depicting him as a lame character constantly trying (and failing) to get his own series. He introduced Brother Voodoo's sister and nephew: Sister Voodoo and Voodoo Chile.

When Brother Voodoo finally got his own solo story in Marvel Super-Heroes vol. 2 #1, Hembeck drew it, in a serious art style very different from his normal cartooning look.

In his cartoon in the final issue of Marvel Age Hembeck claimed he had only begun mocking Brother Voodoo because he had the character confused with an "even lamer" Silver Age character, DC's Brother Power the Geek.

=== Other publications ===
Hembeck has also been published by First Comics, Krause Publications, Comic Shop News, Fantagraphics Books, Topps Comics, TwoMorrows Publishing, and Archie Comics.

Many of Hembeck's past strips are available through his website.

== Parody ==
Although most of Hembeck's work is itself parody, Hembeck and his drawing style have also been the subject of parody:

- In issue #3 of the first Omega Men series (drawn by Keith Giffen), a team member named "Humbek" appears, drawn in a style approximating that of Hembeck (as opposed to the more representational art of the rest of the issue). His thoughts reveal him to be an underground cartoonist exiled from his homeworld. Seconds later, he is killed by Lobo.
- Later in issue #307 of the second volume of the Legion of Super-Heroes (also drawn by Giffen), the words "I killed Fred Humbeck" appear in the filigree of a panel border.

== Bibliography ==
=== FantaCo Hembeck series ===
- #1: Hembeck: The Best of Dateline: @!!?# (first published by Eclipse in 1979, reprinted with 8 new pages by FantaCo in 1980)
- #2: Hembeck 1980 (1980)
- #3: Abbott and Costello Meet the Bride of Hembeck (1980)
- #4: Bah, Hembeck! (1980)
- #5: The Hembeck File (1981)
- #6: Jimmy Olsen's Pal, Fred Hembeck (1981)
- #7: Dial H for Hembeck (1983)

=== DC ===
- 'Mazing Man #7–10 (1986)

=== Marvel ===
- Fantastic Four Roast (1982)
- Spectacular Spider-Man #86 (1984)
- Marvel Age Annual #3 (1987)
- Fred Hembeck Destroys the Marvel Universe (1989)
- Fred Hembeck Sells the Marvel Universe (1990)
- Marvel Super-Heroes vol. 3 #1 (1990)
- Marvel Universe According to Hembeck (2016) (collects Fantastic Four Roast, Fred Hembeck Destroys the Marvel Universe, Fred Hembeck Sells the Marvel Universe, Spectacular Spider-Man #86 and more)

=== Image Comics ===
- The Nearly Complete Essential Hembeck Archives Omnibus (2008)—900-plus-page compilation of previously published strips and comics not owned by other companies, including all of the books published by FantaCo. Introduction by Stan Lee. ISBN 978-1-58240-872-9.

== General and cited references ==
- Fred Hembeck at the Comic Book DB (archived from the original)
- Hembeck bio at Lambiek.net
