= Not Brand Echh =

Marvel Comics comic book series

- Not Brand Echh #2 (Sept. 1967). Cover art by Marie Severin, featuring parodies of Marvel characters as well as those of DC, Gold Key, and Tower Comics.

Publication information
- Publisher: Marvel Comics
- Schedule: Monthly
- Format: Ongoing series
- Genre: Humor/comedy, superhero
- Publication date: August 1967 – May 1969
- No. of issues: 13; 14th issue in 2017
- Main character: Forbush Man

Not Brand Echh is a satiric comic book series published by Marvel Comics that parodied its own superhero stories as well as those of other comics publishers. Running for 13 issues (cover-dated Aug. 1967 to May 1969), it included among its contributors such notable writers and artists as Stan Lee, Jack Kirby, Gene Colan, Bill Everett, John and Marie Severin, and Roy Thomas. With issue #9, it became a 68-page, 25¢ "giant", relative to the typical 12¢ comics of the times. In 2017, a 14th issue was released.

Its mascot, Forbush Man, introduced in the first issue, was a superhero wannabe with no superpowers and a costume of red long johns emblazoned with the letter "F" and a cooking pot, with eye-holes, covering his never-revealed head. His secret identity was eventually revealed in issue #5 (Dec. 1967) as Irving Forbush, Marvel's fictitious office gofer.

== Publication history ==
Marvel Comics' superhero-satire comic book Not Brand Echh ran an initial 13 issues (cover-dated Aug. 1967 - May 1969), with a 14th issue published in 2017. Editors Roy Thomas and Gary Friedrich pitched a comics series that would poke fun of other companies' characters, but Stan Lee decided that it should focus its satiric lens on Marvel's own output.

The series title was a play on an advertising convention of the time, in which a competitor's product was not referred to by name, but simply as "Brand X"; DC was sometimes playfully called "Brand Echh" in Marvel "Bullpen Bulletins" and letters pages, hence this comic was "Not Brand Echh". The title of the comic in its postal indicia was Brand Echh for its first four issues, and afterward Not Brand Echh, the trademarked cover title from the start.

Typical stories and name transpositions included Ironed Man (Iron Man) vs. Magnut, Robot Biter (Gold Key Comics' Magnus, Robot Fighter); "Best Side Story", with Dr. Deranged (Dr. Strange) in a West Side Story pastiche; "The Origin of...Stuporman", a Superman takeoff recalling Wally Wood's influential "Superduperman" in Mad #4 (May 1952); the Ecchs-Men in "If Magneat-O Should Clobber Us", parodying not only the X-Men and Magneto, but also the high melodrama of 1960s Marvel titles; and Marvel characters visually standing-in for the baseball-player protagonists of the otherwise faithfully rendered famous poem "Casey at the Bat". Events took place in the "Marble Universe", a play on the Marvel Universe.

In broader topical references, Gary Friedrich, writer of Sgt. Fury and His Howling Commandos, and cartoonist and Marvel production manager John Verpoorten contributed a Marvel-character version of the Beatles' Sgt. Pepper's Lonely Hearts Club Band record album art. Robert Crumb's album cover art for Big Brother and the Holding Company was parodied by Herb Trimpe. Later issues had parodies of famous films such as Guess Who's Coming to Dinner and Camelot and features about superhero poetry, superhero carnival and "Rent A Super-Hero", in which children employed their favorite heroes to help with mundane tasks like family plumbing problems. Warren Publishing editor Bill DuBay drew and co-wrote one story in his only Marvel appearance. Issue #10 featured solely reprints from earlier issues.

Radio and TV personality Paul Gambaccini said that he coined the term "Brand Echh" in his letter published in The Amazing Spider-Man #7 (Dec. 1963).

== Similar Marvel publications ==
Marvel published a humor comic called Spoof that ran from 1970 to 1973. In 1988, Marvel published What The--?!, a four-issue miniseries (Aug.–Nov. 1988), followed by an additional 22 issues continuing the numbering (July 1989 – Sept. 1993). One story, for instance, featured "Superbman vs. The Fantastical Four" — the same name as in Not Brand Echh for a parodistic Fantastic Four. Not Brand Echh mascot Forbush Man made a cover-featured return appearance in issue #8 (July 1990). Two one-shots, Wha...Huh? in 2005, and Marvel: Now What?! in 2013 revisited the concept.

The Official Handbook to the Marvel Universe: Alternate Universes (2005) designated the Earth of Not Brand Echh and What The--?! as Earth-665.

Characters inspired by those in Not Brand Echh made an appearance in Marvel's Nextwave series.

== Reprints ==
Several stories were reprinted in the three-issue Marvel comic Crazy! (Feb.–June 1973), not to be confused with Marvel's black-and-white magazine Crazy Magazine.

In the UK, the comic was published in a tabloid-like black-and-white format in the early 1980s and renamed Marvel Madhouse.

In 2022, NFT app VeVe reissued 10,000 copies of issue #1 with five variant covers.

== Collected editions ==
Title	Material collected	Published date	ISBN
Marvel Masterworks: Not Brand Echh	Not Brand Echh #1-13 and material from Daredevil Annual #1, Fantastic Four Annual #5, Sgt. Fury Annual #4, Avengers Annual #2, The Amazing Spider-Man Annual #5	June 2015	978-0785190707
Not Brand Echh: The Complete Collection	Not Brand Echh #1-14 and material from Daredevil Annual #1, Fantastic Four Annual #5, Sgt. Fury Annual #4, Avengers Annual #2, The Amazing Spider-Man Annual #1, 5	June 2019	978-1302918828
