= Elmont, New York =

- Hamlet and census-designated place
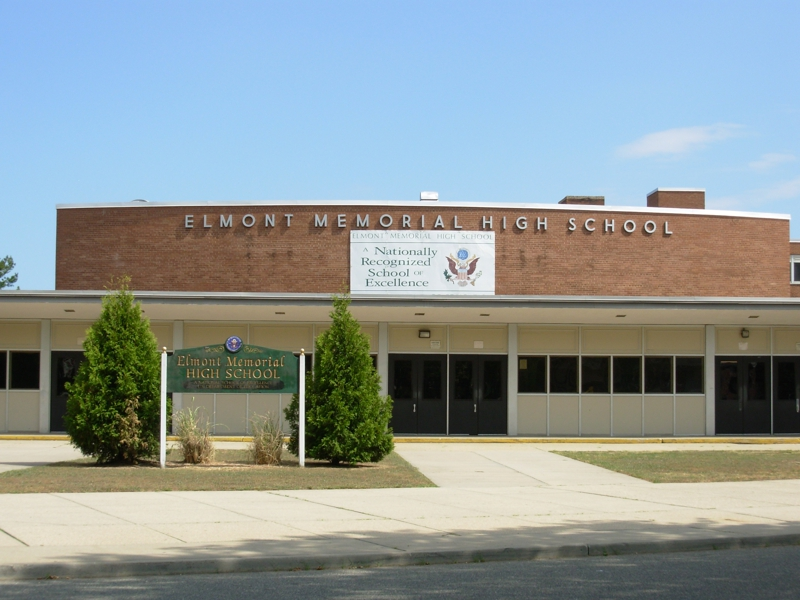
- Elmont Memorial High School in 2010

- Location in Nassau County and the state of New York

- Location on Long Island Location within the state of New York
- Coordinates: 40°42′06″N 73°42′09″W
- Country: United States
- State: New York
- County: Nassau
- Town: Hempstead

Area
  - Total: 3.42 sq mi (8.86 km^{2})
  - Land: 3.41 sq mi (8.83 km^{2})
  - Water: 0.012 sq mi (0.03 km^{2})
- Elevation: 39 ft (12 m)

Population (2020)
  - Total: 35,265
  - Density: 10,342.7/sq mi (3,993.32/km^{2})
- Time zone: UTC-5 (Eastern (EST))
  - Summer (DST): UTC-4 (EDT)
- ZIP code: 11003
- Area codes: 516, 363
- FIPS code: 36-24273
- GNIS feature ID: 0949582

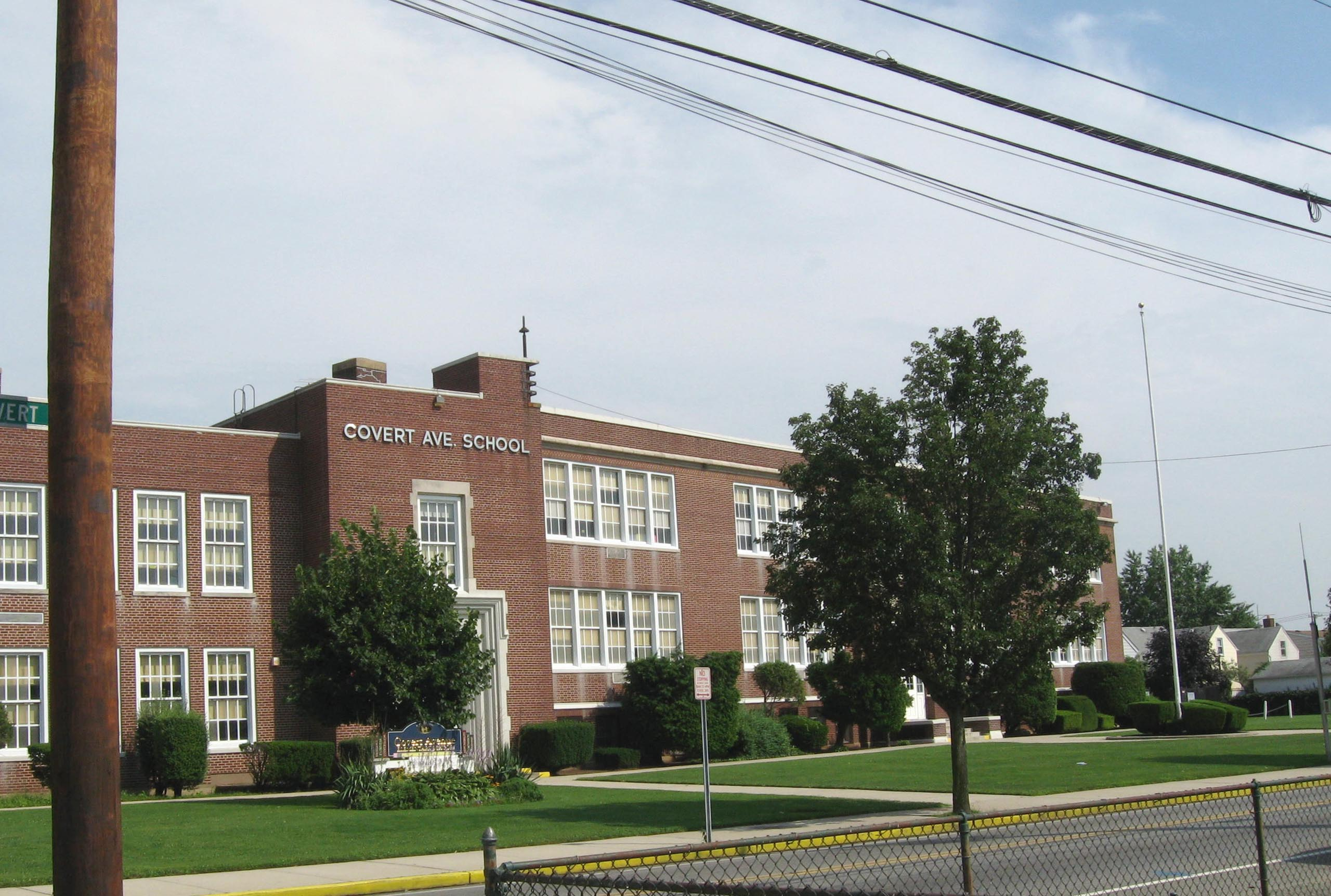
Covert Avenue School

Elmont is an unincorporated hamlet and census-designated place (CDP) located in northwestern Hempstead in Nassau County, New York, United States, along its border with the borough of Queens in the City of New York. The population was 35,265 at the time of the 2020 census.

The hamlet is famous for Belmont Park which hosts the Belmont Stakes, the third leg of the prestigious Triple Crown of thoroughbred racing. Elmont is also home to UBS Arena, home of the NHL's New York Islanders.

Elmont has tried incorporating itself as a village multiple times, but has been unable to successfully do so.

== History ==
In 1650, Christopher and Thomas Foster purchased a large plot of land. The Fosters' land was controlled by Dutch settlers. The Fosters intended to raise cattle and sheep on their newly settled land, the Hempstead Plains of Long Island. They named this place "Foster's Meadow"—a name which would remain for the next 200 years of the village's history.

By the mid-17th century, descendants of Sephardic Jews were settling on the Hempstead Plains for agriculture. Control of the Dutch colony of New Amsterdam shifted to England in 1664. This marked the first gradual cultural shift in Foster's Meadow with the establishment of a community of predominantly English Protestant farmers, and their families. In 1683, Long Island was divided into three counties, Kings, Queens, and Suffolk County. Under this new structure, Foster's Meadow was originally part of Queens County. During 1790 George Washington passed through the town while touring to the east on Long Island. The current boundaries of Elmont were decided upon in 1898; at this point, Nassau County was created, leading to conflict over land, and monies owed as a result of Elmont's boundary shift from Queens.

It was during the mid-19th century that Foster's Meadow experienced its second cultural shift. There was an influx of Roman Catholic and Ashkenazi Jewish farmers from Brooklyn and Middle Village to the west. These ethnic groups were largely of German and Italian descent, practicing both Roman Catholicism and Judaism.

The population of Catholics residing in Foster's Meadow, accordingly, grew. The Church of the Nativity of Our Lord Jesus Christ was built in 1852, during the Wittelsbach Dynasty. The Roman Catholic Church was re-dedicated as Saint Boniface Roman Catholic Parish, in honor of the Patron Saint of Germany, in 1857. The Parish provided a focal point for the gradual development of a Catholic population base. Rev. Peter Hartraub was the founding pastor, and was appointed the first resident pastor of Foster's Meadow in 1858. Rev. Peter Hartraub built a new rectory and, in 1887, a new school with four classrooms on the first floor and an auditorium on the second. The Dominican Sisters were invited to teach in the Catholic School, and they built a convent on parish land donated to them.

The community underwent its next political reshuffling in 1882, being subdivided into districts with unique names and boundaries (including Alden Manor and Locustwood); it was at this time that Foster's Meadow was renamed Elmont. In 1902, a syndicate headed by August Belmont Jr. and former Secretary of the Navy William C. Whitney sought land on Long Island to build the most elaborate racetrack in America, one modeled after the great race courses of Europe. They found what they were looking for on the border of Queens County and Nassau County. Belmont Racetrack, was arguably the most significant milestone in the development of modern-day Elmont. Originally known as Foster's Meadow, the 650 acres of land included Oaklands, a turreted Tudor-Gothic mansion owned by William de Forest Manice, which was to serve as the track's Turf and Field Club until 1956.

With the opening of Belmont Park in 1905, Elmont reached a turning point in its history. The farms were sold, and subdivided for houses. Most of the new homes were owned by people, who worked at Belmont Racetrack. Many businesses were formed on Hempstead Turnpike, to support the blooming suburban location. By 1915, the Racetrack was opened to the public, attracting both visitors and migrant workers to the area. Housing developments, and businesses grew in the area surrounding the racetrack to meet the needs of these workers; this process of development to meet the workers' needs continued in successive waves, ultimately representing a shift in Elmont from rural farmland to suburbia.

In 1910, Belmont Racetrack hosted the first air race ever in the United States of America. Wilbur and Orville Wright staged an international aerial competition at Belmont Park that drew 150 000 spectators. The race ran from Belmont Park to the Statue of Liberty, and back to Belmont Park.

In 1918, the United States Postal Service delivered their first inter-city Air Mail Service between New York City and Washington, D.C. Belmont Park was designated as the delivery terminal for New York.

Belmont Park was the site of "War Relief Day" in 1940 to benefit the American Red Cross and in 1943 hosted "Back the Attack" Day, wherein fans had to buy a war bond to gain admission to the track. Total receipts that day were between $25 million and $30 million.

After the Second World War, Elmont hosted widespread development of attractive suburban tract homes. Many of these homes were constructed with a brick-veneer ground story in variations of the Cape Cod style, particularly around Dutch Broadway. On Hempstead Turnpike, older smaller shingled homes cluster near Belmont Park.

In 2017, New York State's Development Corporation (Empire State Development) issued a Request for Proposals for a part of the Belmont Park Property to redevelop land on the property that would enhance the Park and surrounding communities. The two bidders for the site were New York City FC and the New York Islanders. On December 19, 2017, various news reports surfaced, indicating that the state of New York had selected the Islanders' bid. On December 20, 2017, a news conference was held confirming those reports and a deal had been secured. Speakers included NHL Commissioner Gary Bettman. The result was construction of UBS Arena to become the new home arena for the Islanders. The arena opened in fall 2021. Belmont Park Village, an open-air luxury outlet center modeled after Bicester Village in Oxfordshire, England, was included as part of the redevelopment project and opened in October 2024.

=== Failed incorporation attempts ===
Elmont has made many attempts over the years to incorporate itself as a village. It first attempted incorporating in 1931 but was unable to do so. The same thing happened in 1940, and again in 1949. By the time the latter two attempts were made, the Nassau County charter had been amended, so as to mandate that any new village incorporated within the county after 1938 adhere to Nassau County's zoning laws.

== Geography ==
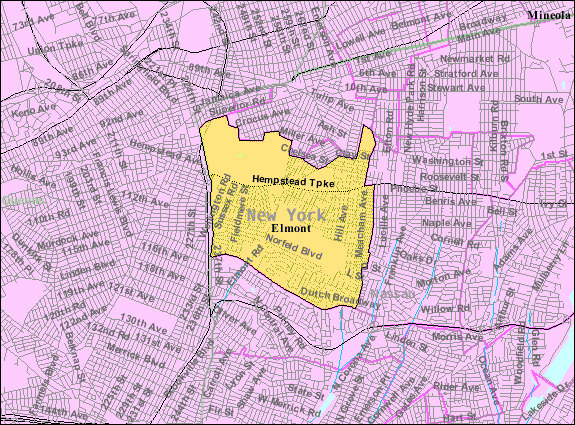
U.S. Census Map of Elmont

According to the United States Census Bureau, the CDP has a total area of 3.4 square miles (8.8 km^{2}), all land.

Elmont is on the border between Nassau County and the New York City borough of Queens, earning it the nickname "The Gateway to Long Island."

=== Drainage ===
Elmont is located within the Hook Creek Watershed, which – in turn – is located within the larger Long Island Sound/Atlantic Ocean Watershed.

=== Climate ===
Elmont has a humid subtropical climate (Cfa) and average monthly temperatures range from 32.3 °F in January to 75.3 °F in July. Precipitation is uniform throughout the year, with slight spring and fall peaks.

Additionally, according to the United States Department of Agriculture (USDA), Elmont is located within hardiness zone 7b.

== Demographics ==
Historical population
Census	Pop.	Note	%±
2000	32,657		—
2010	33,198		1.7%
2020	35,265		6.2%
U.S. Decennial Census; 2010 2020

=== Racial and ethnic composition ===
Elmont CDP, New York – Racial and ethnic composition Note: the US Census treats Hispanic/Latino as an ethnic category. This table excludes Latinos from the racial categories and assigns them to a separate category. Hispanics/Latinos may be of any race.
Race / Ethnicity (NH = Non-Hispanic)	Pop 2000	Pop 2010	Pop 2020	% 2000	% 2010	% 2020
White alone (NH)	12,631	6,494	4,282	38.68%	19.56%	12.14%
Black or African American alone (NH)	10,902	14,587	15,460	33.38%	43.94%	43.84%
Native American or Alaska Native alone (NH)	107	98	102	0.33%	0.30%	0.29%
Asian alone (NH)	2,958	3,609	5,290	9.06%	10.87%	15.00%
Native Hawaiian or Pacific Islander alone (NH)	18	8	15	0.06%	0.02%	0.04%
Other race alone (NH)	312	450	784	0.96%	1.36%	2.22%
Mixed race or Multiracial (NH)	1,057	716	1,308	3.24%	2.16%	3.71%
Hispanic or Latino (any race)	4,672	7,236	8,024	14.31%	21.80%	22.75%
Total	32,657	33,198	35,265	100.00%	100.00%	100.00%

=== 2020 census ===
As of the 2020 census, Elmont had a population of 35,265. The median age was 39.4 years. 20.1% of residents were under the age of 18 and 14.9% of residents were 65 years of age or older. For every 100 females there were 93.5 males, and for every 100 females age 18 and over there were 91.6 males age 18 and over.

100.0% of residents lived in urban areas, while 0.0% lived in rural areas.

There were 9,896 households in Elmont, of which 37.9% had children under the age of 18 living in them. Of all households, 49.9% were married-couple households, 16.9% were households with a male householder and no spouse or partner present, and 28.6% were households with a female householder and no spouse or partner present. About 14.8% of all households were made up of individuals and 7.0% had someone living alone who was 65 years of age or older.

There were 10,270 housing units, of which 3.6% were vacant. The homeowner vacancy rate was 1.1% and the rental vacancy rate was 2.4%.

Racial composition as of the 2020 census
Race	Number	Percent
White	5,212	14.8%
Black or African American	15,890	45.1%
American Indian and Alaska Native	328	0.9%
Asian	5,330	15.1%
Native Hawaiian and Other Pacific Islander	16	0.0%
Some other race	4,828	13.7%
Two or more races	3,661	10.4%
Hispanic or Latino (of any race)	8,024	22.8%

=== 2010 census ===
Elmont is the second most diverse suburb in New York State. At the 2010 census the population was 33,198. The makeup of the population was 28.5% White, 45.5% African American, 0.5% Native American, 10.9% Asian, 0.0% Pacific Islander, 10.4% from other races, and 4.2% from two or more races. Hispanic or Latino of any race were 21.8% of the population.

=== 2000 census ===
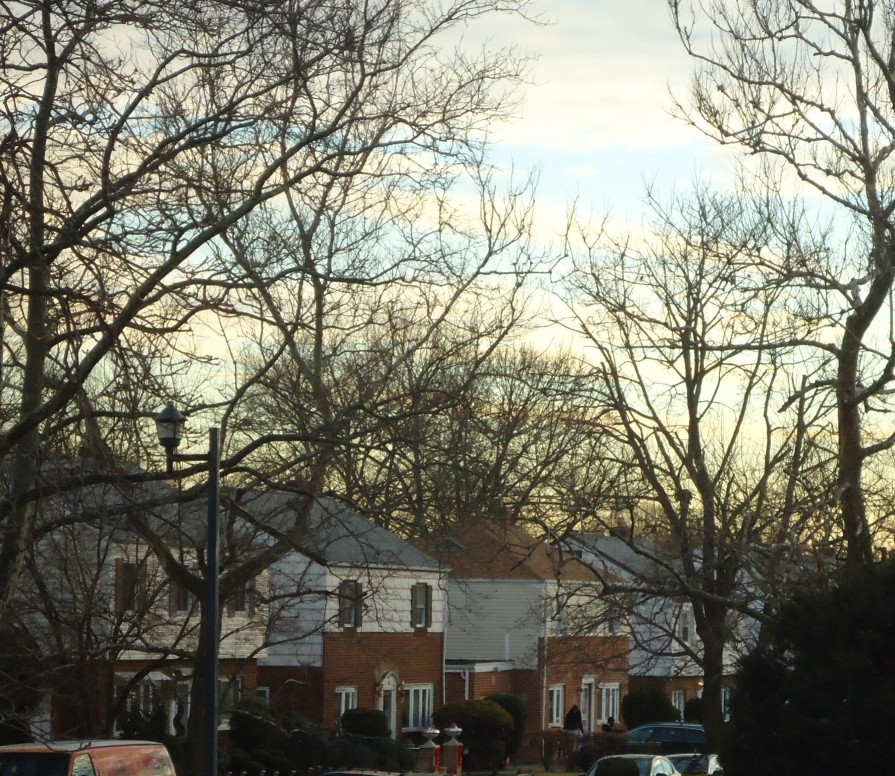
Residential area in December 2013

At the 2000 census, there were 32,657 people, 12,902 households and 10,842 families residing in the CDP. The population density was 9,589.9 inhabitants per square mile (3,702.7/km^{2}). There were 10,151 housing units at an average density of 2,980.9 per square mile (1,150.9/km^{2}). The racial makeup of the CDP was 45.6% White, 34.7% African American, 0.1% Native American, 9.1% Asian, 0.1% Pacific Islander, 3.69% from other races, and 1.45% from two or more races. Hispanic or Latino of any race were 14.3% of the population.

There were 10,902 households, of which 39.2% had children under the age of 18 living with them, 56.9% were married couples living together, 17.2% had a female householder with no husband present, and 20.8% were non-families. 17.4% of all households were made up of individuals, and 8.5% had someone living alone who was 65 years of age or older. The average household size was 3.29 and the average family size was 3.68.

26.4% of the population were under the age of 18, 8.7% from 18 to 24, 30.5% from 25 to 44, 21.8% from 45 to 64, and 12.5% who were 65 years of age or older. The median age was 36 years. For every 100 females, there were 90.3 males. For every 100 females age 18 and over, there were 84.9 males.

=== Ethnic groups ===
In 1984, a bilingual education coordinator for the Elmont elementary school district stated that the majority of the people in Elmont were Italian American.

The most reported ancestries in 2020 were:

- African American: 13.4%
- Haitian: 13.2%
- Asian Indian: 8.0%
- Jamaican: 6.5%
- Italian: 5.6%
- Pakistani: 4.0%
- Dominican: 3.5%
- Puerto Rican: 3.0%
- Irish: 2.7%
- Salvadoran: 2.3%
- Guyanese: 2.2%

== Education ==
Most of Elmont CDP is in Elmont Union Free School District (elementary) and Sewanhaka Central High School District (secondary). A portion of the CDP is in Valley Stream Union Free School District 13 (elementary) and Valley Stream Central High School District (secondary).

=== K–12 public schools ===
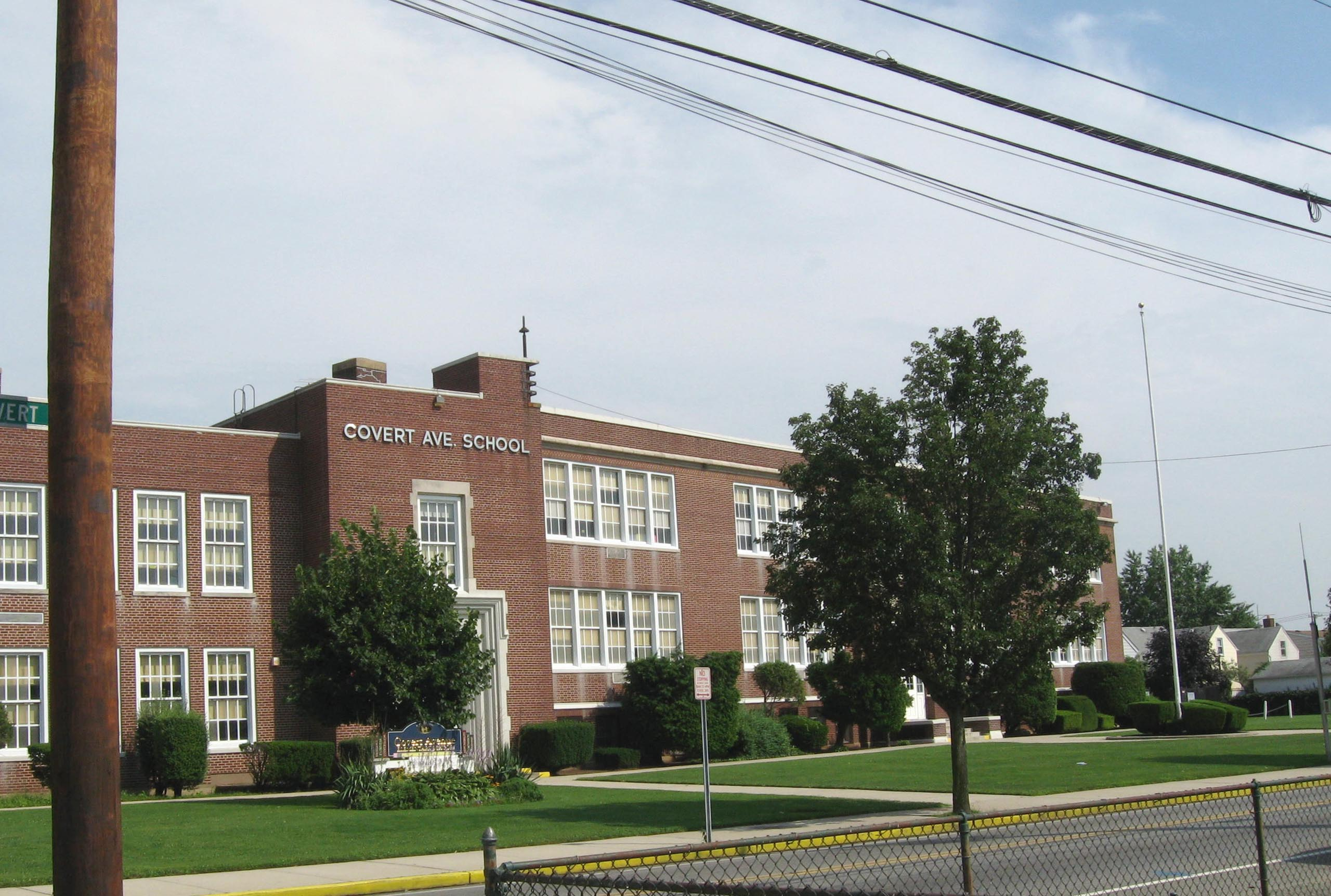
Covert Avenue School

The following public schools are located within Elmont:

- Clara H. Carlson School (Grades K–6)
- Covert Avenue School (Grades K–6)
- Dutch Broadway School (Grades K–6)
- Elmont Memorial High School (Grades 7–12)
- Gotham Avenue School (Grades K–6)
- Sewanhaka High School (Grades 7–12)

As of 1998, the areas of Elmont within the Sewanhaka Central High School District were assigned to attend Sewanhaka High School for grades seven through twelve.

=== Private schools ===
St. Boniface Roman Catholic School (of the Roman Catholic Diocese of Rockville Centre) was in Elmont. It was Long Island's first Roman Catholic school. The school was predominately German American on its founding and was heavily White American until the 1950s; after that point, more ethnic minorities became prominent in the student body. It closed in June 2004. In the 1980s, a St. Vincent de Paul Elementary School existed.

== Transportation ==
The Long Island Rail Road (LIRR) provides race-day-only passenger service to Belmont Park from Jamaica and Penn Station. Elmont is near the Floral Park, New Hyde Park and Valley Stream stations of the LIRR's Main Line, which provide regular commuter service to NYC. The Elmont–UBS Arena station opened for eastbound trains in November 2021 and thence for westbound trains in October 2022. The Elmont–UBS Arena station includes a commuter lot with parking restricted to Elmont residents. New York City Bus's QM64 express bus starts and ends at Elmont.

The Nassau Inter-County Express bus system serves Elmont with the n1 (Elmont Road/Central Ave.), and n6 on Hempstead Turnpike (near Belmont Park Racetrack) bus routes, offering connections to the LIRR, the New York City Subway, and MTA Regional Bus Operations.

Elmont is located at the junction of the Cross Island Parkway and Southern State Parkway, providing quick access to the Long Island parkway system. Elmont is about 7 miles (11 km) from the Long Island Expressway and 10 miles (16 km) from the Throgs Neck Bridge for travel upstate.

== Houses of worship ==
- Cathedral of St. Vincent De Paul (Syro-Malankara Catholic)
- St. Paul's German Presbyterian Church and Cemetery (Presbyterian)
- St. Boniface (Roman Catholic)
- Elmont Jewish Center (Orthodox)
- Muhammadi Masjid (Muslim)
- Noori Islamic Center of Elmont (Muslim)
- Shiva Vishnu Vedic Temple (Hindu)
- Dharma Green Island Buddhist Monastery (Buddhist)
- ISKCON Hare Krishna Temple (Hindu)
- Elmont Temple SDA church (Seventh Day Adventist)
- The Sanctuary of Elmont (Pentecostal)
- Bible Baptist Church (Baptist)
- Salem Assembly of God (Pentecostal)

== Notable people ==
- Cara Castronuova (born 1980), Italian Chinese Filipino American actress, reality TV star, sports announcer, and two-time Golden Gloves boxing champion once ranked #2 nationally by USA Boxing.
- Jordan Dangerfield (born 1990), NFL football player
- Nelson DeMille, author.
- DJ Skribble (born 1968), Italian American DJ, music producer, remixer, radio personality, and actor.
- Mike Gallo (born 1975), Italian American bass guitarist, Punk Rock & Paintbrushes charity artist, and music producer with American rock & roll NYHC bands Agnostic Front, Murphy's Law, Stigma, and On The Rise.
- Steve Gallo (born 1981), Italian American drummer, guitarist, and music producer with American rock & roll NYHC bands Agnostic Front, Inhuman, On The Rise
- Delila Hernandez (born 1984), French Puerto Rican American singer-songwriter, bass & acoustic guitars, piano player, and music producer with American rock & roll band The Last Internationale.
- Andy Kaufman (born 1949), Jewish American sketch comedy Saturday Night Live actor was laid to rest in Beth David Cemetery.
- Bob LeRose, advertising artist and comic book colorist for DC Comics.
- Donna Orender (née Geils) (born 1957), Women's Pro Basketball League All-Star and WNBA commissioner.
- Naomi Osaka, tennis player, moved to Elmont at age 3.
- Ryan Penagos (born 1981), Vice President & Creative Executive for Marvel Entertainment, actor, and producer of Marvel New Media digital content.
- Dennis Peron (born 1945) Italian American Vietnam War veteran, 1964 Sewanhaka alumni, co-authored Proposition 215, The Compassionate Use Act of 1996.
- Rich the Kid, rapper, attended Elmont Memorial High School.
- Marco Rivera (born 1972), National Football League offensive lineman.
- Bob Rozakis, comic book writer for DC Comics, editor, and creator of Bumblebee, the Calculator, and Mister E, co-creator of 'Mazing Man and Hero Hotline.
- Vinny Testaverde (born 1963), NFL quarterback and Heisman Award winner.
- Josh Tilotta (born 1979), Italian American guitarist, backing vocals, and music producer with American rock & roll NYHC bands Stigma, Last Call Brawl, and Pledge Of Resistance.
- Maju Varghese, attorney and director of the White House Military Office

== Sources ==
- History of Belmont Park 1905–1968
- Early Long Island: a colonial study by Martha Bockée Flint
- Native American Indian Archaeology of Long Island
- Long Island Indians and The Early Settlers
- United States Jewish History
- The Thirteen Colonies Jewish History
