= Mr. America =

Mr. America may refer to:

- Mr. America (film), a 2013 Italian film
- Mr. America (contest), American bodybuilding contest
- "Mr. America" Gene Stanlee, a professional wrestler in the early 1900s
- Mr. America, a character played by Hulk Hogan in WWE in 2003
- Mr American, a 1980 novel by George MacDonald Fraser
- Mister America (comics), three characters
  - Mister America (Jeffrey Graves), a superhero from DC Comics
  - Mister America (Tex Thompson), a superhero from DC Comics
- Harmon Mister America, 1970s American single-seat light sports aircraft
- "Mr America" (song), a song by Russell Morris, (1970)
- Mr America (EP), an EP by Russell Morris, 1972
- Mister America, a 2019 film associated with the On Cinema at the Cinema web series

== See also ==
- Mr. and Mrs. America, a 1945 War Bonds promotion
