= Bernard Baily =

American cartoonist

- Born: April 5, 1916
- Died: January 19, 1996 (aged 79)
- Areas: Writer, Artist, Editor, Publisher
- Pseudonyms: Glenda Carrol, Glenda Carol
- Notable works: The Spectre, Hourman

Bernard Baily (April 5, 1916 – January 19, 1996) was an American comic book artist best known as co-creator of the DC Comics characters the Spectre and Hourman, and a comics publisher, writer, and editor.

== Biography ==
=== Early life and career ===
More Fun Comics #52 (Feb. 1940). Debut of the Spectre. Art by Baily.

Bernard Bailynson was the son and the oldest of four children of two immigrant parents from Vitebsk. His father's name was Anglicized from Beilinsohn to Bailynson, which Bernard shortened to Baily. He began his comics career under S. M. "Jerry" Iger, editor of Wow - What a Magazine!, one of the seminal American comic books. The title ran four issues (cover-dated July-Sept. & Nov. 1936). Like many other creators during the late-1930s and 1940s period fans and historians call the Golden Age of Comic Books, Baily transitioned to the newly formed studio Eisner & Iger, a prominent comic book packager that produced comics on demand for publishers entering the new medium. There through the late 1930s, Baily worked on such fillers as the one-page movie-star biographies "Star Snapshots" for publisher Quality Comics' Smash Comics, as well as on a syndicated comic strip, Phyllis.

For DC Comics precursor National Comics, Baily co-created and drew the adventure feature "Tex Thomson" in Action Comics #1 (June 1938), the landmark comic book that introduced Superman. The Thomson feature ran through Action Comics #32 (Jan. 1941), after which the character adopted the superhero identities Mister America (Action Comics #33-52) and the Americommando (Action Comics #53-74, reaching to cover-date July 1944). Baily also wrote and drew the pirate-adventure feature "Buccaneer" in National's More Fun Comics #32-51 (June 1938 - Jan. 1940).

The spirit of Jim Corrigan sees his own corpse: More Fun Comics #52 (Feb. 1940). Script by Jerry Siegel, art by Baily.

In More Fun Comics #52 (Feb. 1940), Baily and writer Jerry Siegel, Superman's co-creator, introduced DC's violent spirit of vengeance, the Spectre. The afterlife alter ego of murdered police detective Jim Corrigan, the character would become one of the longest-enduring comic-book creations, revived during the mid-1950s to 1960s Silver Age of Comic Books and continuing into the 21st century. One compilation of the top hundred American comics artists writes that, "Baily crafted a mood of menace and suspense, using bravura layouts featuring the Spectre's otherworldly powers and size. He was also a fabulous cover artist who contributed reams of great images."

Baily co-created the frequently revived DC superhero Hourman (dubbed Hour-Man in his earliest appearances), with writer Ken Fitch, in Adventure Comics #48 (April 1940).

The Golden Age Spectre's feature ran through More Fun #101 (Feb. 1945), with the Spectre also appearing as part of the superhero team the Justice Society of America in All Star Comics #1-23 (Summer 1940 - Winter 1944/45), from All-American Publications, one of the early companies that merged with National to form the modern-day DC. Hourman ran through Adventure Comics #83 (Feb. 1943).

Baily also drew the short-lived syndicated comic strips Vic Jordan (which ran from 1944 to 1945 in the New York City newspaper PM) and Stories of the Opera (running from 1949 to 1950).

=== Later career ===
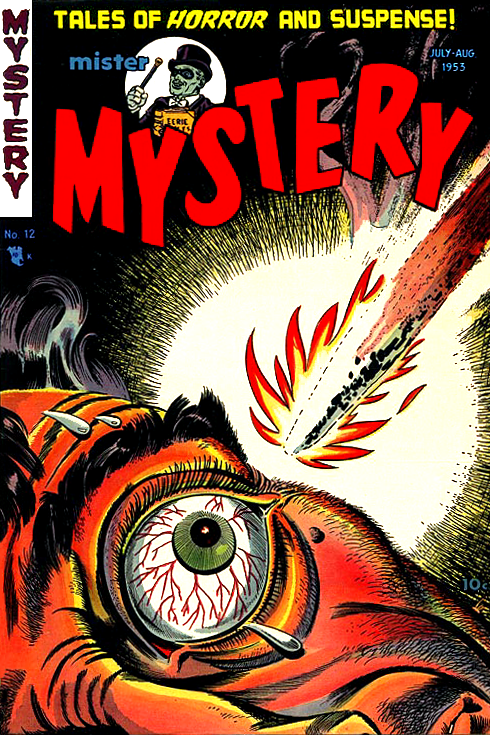
Mister Mystery #12, (July 1953), art by Baily

In 1943, Baily founded the publishing company Baily Publications, also known as Baily Publishing Company and Baily Art Publishing Company, and, with artist Mac Raboy, the comics packager Bernard Baily Studio. The latter concern, which lasted through 1946, was the outsource producer of such comics as Cambridge House Publishers' single-issue Star Studded Comics and Gold Medal Comics (both 1945). Other publishers for whom his studio created comics included the Rural Home Publishing imprint Croyden; Jay Burtis; Narrative; Lindsay Baird; Feature Comics; Neal Publications; the Spotlight Comics imprint Novack '45; R.B. Leffingwell; and Holyoke Publications. Among the fledgling artists gaining a foothold in the industry at Baily's studio were Gil Kane, Carmine Infantino, and Frank Frazetta, who at 16 assisted the established artist John Giunta there. Other personnel included Dan Barry, Dick Briefer, Manny Stallman, and Nina Albright, one of a handful of Golden Age women comic-book artists.

Baily himself drew for a number of companies in the 1950s, including DC Comics (House of Mystery, House of Secrets, Tales of the Unexpected, and the TV-series adaptations Mr. District Attorney and Gang Busters); Fawcett Comics (This Magazine is Haunted, Beware! Terror Tales); Key Publications (Mister Mystery, Weird Mystieres, Weird Chills, Weird Tales of the Future); St. John Publications (Strange Terrors); and Marvel Comics precursor Atlas Comics (Astonishing, Journey into Mystery, Strange Tales, Tales of Justice, Uncanny Tales, World of Fantasy, and others). He also wrote and drew the syndicated comic strip Gilda Gay through the 1950s, and contributed to Major Publications' satirical magazine Cracked.

From the late 1950s through the mid-1960s, Baily teamed with writer Jack Schiff to produce a slew of one-page public-service announcements, such as "Children of Tomorrow," commemorating United Nations Day, "What's Your B.Q.? (Brotherhood Quotient)", and "Bike Safety = Bike Fun!" Through the next decade, he concentrated on drawing supernatural-mystery and science fiction stories for such DC anthology series as The Phantom Stranger, Strange Adventures, Weird War Tales, Witching Hour, and others. He also drew the cover of Stanley Publications' black-and-white horror-comics magazine Chilling Tales of Horror #1 (June 1969).

During the 1970s, Baily published farm periodicals. His last known comics work was penciling the eight-page "His Brother's Keeper", written by Jack Oleck, in DC's House of Mystery #279 (April 1980). Baily was living in Putnam County, New York, at the time of his death at age 79.
