= Justice Leagues =

2001 DC Comics storyline

- Cover of Justice Leagues: JL? #1 (March 2001), art by George Pérez.
- Publisher: DC Comics
- Publication date: March 2001
- Genre: Superhero
Title(s)
Justice Leagues: JL? #1
Justice Leagues: Justice League of Amazons #1
Justice Leagues: Justice League of Atlantis #1
Justice Leagues: Justice League of Arkham #1
Justice Leagues: Justice League of Aliens #1
Justice Leagues: JLA #1

"Justice Leagues" is a storyline which ran through six one-shot comics. Published in 2001 by DC Comics, it introduced a revamped Justice League of America. Each issue was supposedly the first of a new series featuring one of the alternate teams, although they were just one-offs. Featured Justice League were the "Justice League of Aliens", led by Superman and Martian Manhunter; the "Justice League of Amazons", led by Wonder Woman; the "Justice League of Arkham", led by Batman; and the "Justice League of Atlantis", led by Aquaman. Cameo appearances were made by the "Justice League of Adventure" which is led by Flash (Wally West); the "Justice League of Air", led by Green Lantern (Kyle Rayner); the "Justice League of Anarchy", led by Plastic Man; and the "Justice League of Apostles", led by Zauriel.

== Premise ==
In the arc, alien invaders, working through a human-seeming agent known as the "Advance Man", use Hector Hammond, a telepathic supervillain, to cause the world to forget the existence of the Justice League of America. When Hammond discovered the Advance Man's true motives, he attempted to reverse the process but was only able to transmit the partial phrase "Justice League of A--" before being incapacitated by the alien emissary. It was found that the individual members of the Justice League were instinctively creating new crime-fighting organizations beginning with the "Justice League of A" to fill the void.

== Justice League divisions ==
=== Justice League of Amazons ===
The Justice League of Amazons was a team of all female superheroes:

- Wonder Woman (leader)
- Supergirl (Linda Danvers)
- Huntress (Helena Bertinelli)
- Big Barda
- Zatanna
- Power Girl
- Black Orchid

The goal of the Justice League of Amazons was to use their powers and abilities to "protect and defend mother earth and her children". The women went to the Selva Basin to investigate the disappearance of some logging camps. When they arrived, they found a group of loggers who were about to start destroying some of the rainforest. However, there was a shaman standing in their way and preventing them from moving forward. The loggers attacked both the shaman and the Justice League of Amazons, and a fight ensued. The loggers were quickly defeated. After the fight, the shaman returned home. It was then revealed that he was actually the Advance Man in disguise. He used the Justice League of Amazons to remove the loggers from the area so that he would be able to find an unknown spider that carried a virus capable of "exterminating the human surplus". While the Justice League of Amazons were relaxing at the Amazon River, Aquaman appeared with several other heroes and asked Power Girl to join the "Justice League of Atlantis".

=== Justice League of Anarchy ===
The Justice League of Anarchy was a team composed of comedy-themed superheroes:

- Plastic Man (leader)
- 'Mazing Man
- Ambush Bug
- Creeper
- Trickster
- Harley Quinn

=== Justice League of Atlantis ===
The Justice League of Atlantis was a team of aquatic superheroes:

- Aquaman (leader)
- Mera
- Tempest
- Arion
- Power Girl
- Lori Lemaris
- Devilfish

Aquaman formed the Justice League of Atlantis while he was investigating an area nearby Atlantis. While he was there, he discovered cybernetic dolphins and sharks swimming together. He followed them to a large metal object with tentacles that was absorbing metals and minerals from the ocean floor. The Justice League of Atlantis was brought together, and they searched the metal structure. There, they easily defeated the cybernetic dolphins and sharks. Devilfish destroyed the structure before anyone could figure out its purpose. Devilfish left the group and joined the Advance Man, where other similar metal structures existed.

=== Justice League of Apostles ===
The Justice League of Apostles was a team of superheroes based around the theme of religion or the supernatural:

- Zauriel (leader)
- Phantom Stranger
- Doctor Fate (Hector Hall)
- Deadman
- Zatanna

=== Justice League of Adventure ===
The Justice League of Adventure was a team of superheroes. Unlike the other divisions, this team contains no obvious connecting theme:

- Flash (Wally West) (leader)
- Mister Miracle (Scott Free)
- Atom (Ray Palmer)
- Beast Boy
- Black Canary

=== Justice League of Arkham ===
The Justice League of Arkham was a team of Batman supporting characters:

- Batman (leader)
- Nightwing
- Joker
- Catwoman
- Riddler
- Ventriloquist
- Poison Ivy

After learning of the Advance Man's plan to release a toxic gas that reacts with water to kill all life forms that come in contact with it in Gotham City, Batman freed The Joker from the Slab. He also freed Riddler, Poison Ivy, and Ventriloquist from Arkham Asylum so that they could aid him in stopping the Advance Man. The Justice League of Arkham broke into the processing plant in which the Advance Man was planning to release the toxic gas and captured him. While interrogating him, the Joker escaped. Both Batman and Nightwing went into pursuit. During this time, the Advance Man convinced the remaining super-villains to abandon Batman. After they left, the Advance Man freed himself and teleported to San Francisco.

=== Justice League of Aliens ===
The Justice League of Aliens was a team of alien superheroes:

- Martian Manhunter (leader)
- Superman
- Orion
- Starfire
- Lobo
- Guy Gardner
- Starman (Mikaal Tomas)

Martian Manhunter formed the Justice League of Aliens as a way for the alien heroes that occupy Earth to show the humans that they can trust them. Not everyone that J'onn had gathered was interested in becoming part of the League, however. Both Starman and Orion felt they did not need to be part of a team. Starman left the team, but Orion remained. The Advance Man's large metal structures that he had created during the "Justice League of Atlantis" became active, and they started to transform people who had the correct DNA sequence into monsters. These new "monsters" were being created as a host for the Advance Man's boss, Plura, to come to Earth and take over. The Justice League of Aliens fought several of the "monsters", but they were unable to prevent Plura from overtaking any of those remaining.

=== Justice League of Air ===
The Justice League of Air was a team of flying superheroes:

- Green Lantern (Kyle Rayner) (leader)
- Black Condor (Ryan Kendall)
- Captain Atom
- Ray (Ray Terrill)
- Firestorm (Ronnie Raymond)
- Doctor Light (Kimiyo Hoshi)
- Red Tornado

== Issues ==
1. Justice Leagues: JL? #1
2. Justice Leagues: Justice League of Amazons #1
3. Justice Leagues: Justice League of Atlantis #1
4. Justice Leagues: Justice League of Arkham #1
5. Justice Leagues: Justice League of Aliens #1
6. Justice Leagues: JLA #1
