= Laurie Rozakis =

American writer

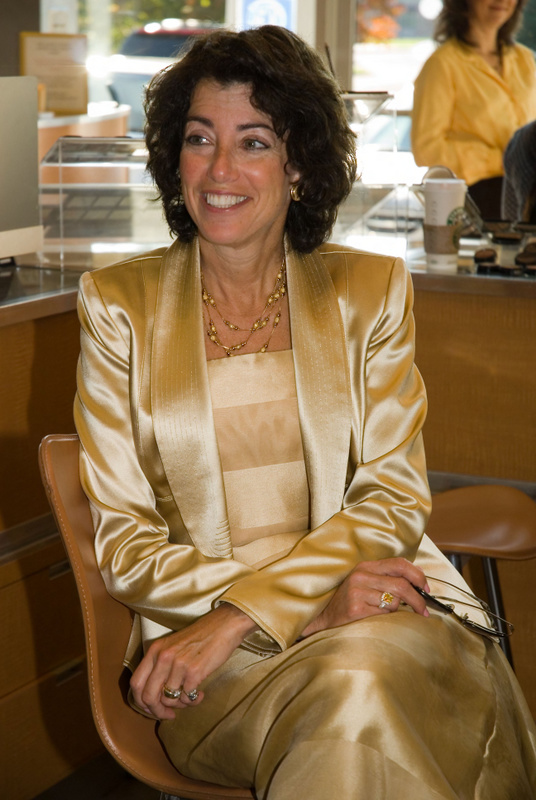
- Born: Laurie Ellen Neu; July 20, 1952 (age 74); New York City, U.S.
- Education: Hofstra University (BA, MA); Stony Brook University (PhD)
- Occupations: Writer, editor, professor, public speaker
- Spouse: Bob Rozakis
- Children: Charles Rozakis; Samantha Rozakis
- Website: www.laurierozakis.com

Laurie Rozakis (born July 20, 1952) is a writer of the Complete Idiot's books and an expert on writing, grammar, usage, test preparation, and coaching writers. She earned her Bachelor of Arts from Hofstra University in 1973; her Master of Arts from Hofstra in 1975; and her PhD from the State University of New York at Stony Brook in 1984.

== Career ==
Rozakis got her start as a writer in 1981 when she published a review book on the Advanced Placement exam in English Literature with ARCO. To date, she has published more than 100 books and articles.

In addition to writing, Rozakis taught for 42 years.

Rozakis's first work was a series of books for test preparation (The New GED, College English Placement and Proficiency Exam, Reading Power: Getting Started, and Power Reading.) She continued writing widely on test preparation, publishing three test prep books for elementary and middle-school students through Scholastic.

=== Complete Idiot's Guides ===
Between 1995 and 2003, Rozakis wrote more than a dozen books in the Complete Idiot's Guides series, including The Complete Idiot's Guide to Creative Writing, The Complete Idiot's Guide to Research Methods and The Complete Idiot's Guide to Grammar and Style. She has revised many of the books for subsequent editions.

=== Scholarship ===
Rozakis's early scholarship focused on writing, including articles on evaluating writing for SUNY Councils on Writing, The Missouri English Bulletin, Exercise Exchange, and Kansas English. Subsequently, she turned to early American literature, publishing "A New Source for Hawthorne's Hester Prynne" in American Transcendental Quarterly: A Journal of New England Writers (1986). This was followed by “Puritan Punishment for Adulterous Conduct” in The Nathaniel Hawthorne Review (1990). In 2004, she wrote essays on Louis Simpson and Alicia Ostriker for the Encyclopedia of Multiethnic American Literature. She wrote an analysis of classic American novels for the PBS televisions series The American Novel (2007).

=== Video instruction ===
Rozakis has combined her expertise with writing and speaking in a series of instructional videos. These include a 10 CD/video series: Upgrade Your Writing Skills (2006–07) and a four CD/video series: SAT Subject Test, English (2008) for Video Aided Instruction.

=== Writing coach ===
Rozakis also works as a writing coach for fiction (novels and short stories), academic writing, and memoirs, helping writers organize their ideas, craft their sentences and find their individual voice.

=== Speaking career ===
Rozakis has a career as a public speaker, giving frequent lectures, seminars, and interviews. Her television work includes serving as the "Vocabulary Judge" in the Word of the Day final contest on Live with Regis and Kelly, being a grammar expert on Good Day New York, and being part of a panel on the CBS The Morning Show and another on the Maury Povich Show.

She has been interviewed for Newsday, the Los Angeles Times, The Sacramento Bee, The New York Times, the Chicago Tribune, National Public Radio's Morning Edition, New York Daily News, The Newark Star-Ledger, Seventeen magazine, the New York Post, The Dallas Morning News, and Newsday, on grammar and test preparation,

== Personal life ==
Rozakis is married to former comic book writer and editor Bob Rozakis, with whom she has collaborated on a few comic book stories, as well as The Complete Idiot's Guide to Office Politics They have two children, son Charles "Chuck", who wrote his Princeton University thesis on the business viability of webcomics, and daughter Samantha "Sammi".

In 1973, Laurie and Bob Rozakis drove the DC Comicmobile, a van which sold comic books "like the ice cream man did".

== Honors and awards ==
Rozakis has received a number of noteworthy awards including being named the Town of Oyster Bay "Woman of Distinction" in the Arts (2008). She won The State University of New York Chancellor's Award for Excellence in Teaching in 1994 and number of fellowships, including several Joint Labor/Management Committee Individual Development Awards, a Porter Fellowship, a Farmingdale College Foundation Faculty Merit Award, and an Empire State Challenger Fellowship. Her career and life are profiled in the reference books Contemporary Authors and Something About the Author.

== Bibliography (selected) ==
=== Books ===
- New GED, College English Placement and Proficiency Exam (ARCO)
- Reading Power: Getting Started (ARCO)
- Power Reading (ARCO)
- Holistic Evaluation: A Primer, Kansas English (University of Topeka: Topeka, Kansas).
- The Complete Idiot's Guide to Office Politics (with Bob Rozakis) (Alpha Books, 1998) ISBN 0-02-862397-5
- The Complete Idiot’s Guide to Creative Writing (Alpha Books)
- The Complete Idiot’s Guide to Research Methods (Alpha Books)
- The Complete Idiot’s Guide to Grammar and Style (Alpha Books)

=== Articles ===
- “Holistic Evaluation of Writing: A Grading Practicum” Proceedings of the SUNY Council on Writing 3rd Annual Conference (pp. 97–112)
- “To Change the Things that Can be Changed.” The Missouri English Bulletin.
- “A Placement Writing Program,” Exercise Exchange (Utah State University: Logan, Utah.)
- “Establishing, Administering, and Holistically Scoring an English Placement Writing Assessment.” The Minnesota English Journal (St. Cloud State University, MN)
- “A New Source for Hawthorne’s Hester Prynne,” American Transcendental Quarterly: A Journal of New England Writers (1986).
- “Puritan Punishment for Adulterous Conduct” The Nathaniel Hawthorne Review (Vol. XV, No. 2, 1990).
- Essays on Louis Simpson and Alicia Ostriker for Encyclopedia of Multiethnic American Literature. Greenwood Press, Emmanuel S. Nelson, ed. (2004).
