= Mister America (comics) =

Mister America, in comics, is the name of three fictional DC Comics superheroes:

1. Tex Thompson, the Golden Age Mister America, first appeared in June 1938 in Action Comics #1.

2. Trey Thompson (a descendant of his predecessor Tex Thompson) is the prelude to the modern day Mr. America. He first appeared in Justice Society of America (vol. 3) #1 (February 2007) as an FBI special agent who took justice into his own hands after a murderer he captured is set free. Vandal Savage hires the super-thug Catalyst to murder Thompson's entire family, and Savage himself murders Trey Thompson in the following issue.

3. Jeffrey Graves is the modern day Mr. America. Trey's former FBI contact is first seen donning the mask of Mr. America in Justice Society of America (vol. 3) #4 after he is fired due to his connection with Trey. He stumbles into the Justice Society Headquarters at the end of Justice Society of America (vol. 3) #12, seeking help to defeat his mysterious pursuer.

== See also ==
- Mister America (disambiguation)
