= Stephen DeStefano =

American comic book artist (born 1966)

- Born: Stephen DeStefano; January 18, 1966 (age 60) Jamaica, Queens, New York, U.S.
- Areas: Writer, Penciller, Inker
- Notable works: 'Mazing Man; Hero Hotline

Stephen DeStefano (born January 18, 1966) is an American comics artist, animator and storyboard artist best known as the co-creator of 'Mazing Man and Hero Hotline with writer Bob Rozakis.

== Early life ==
DeStefano was born in Jamaica, Queens, New York and attended the High School of Art and Design.

== Career ==
DeStefano's first credit in the comics industry was as the creator of the character Captain Electron in Adventure Comics #479 (March 1981), and then the characters Zeep and Thumbelina in the "Dial H for Hero" story in Adventure Comics #483 (July 1981). His first professionally published comics artwork was a one-page parody of the "I…Vampire" feature in House of Mystery #306 (July 1982). DeStefano wrote and drew "The Mini (Mis)Adventures of Nick O. Tyme" in New Talent Showcase #6–12 (June–December 1984). He then teamed with writer Bob Rozakis to create 'Mazing Man, a character introduced in an eponymous series beginning in January 1986. After the cancellation of that series, the Rozakis-DeStefano team created Hero Hotline in Action Comics Weekly #637 (January 1989). After a four-issue run as a back-up feature, Hero Hotline received its own six-issue limited series. In the 1990s, DeStefano was a frequent contributor to The Big Book Of series published by Paradox Press. His other comics work includes credits at Dark Horse Comics, Disney Comics, Fantagraphics Books, and Marvel Comics. As an animator, DeStefano has worked on such series as The Ren & Stimpy Show and Futurama. He inked the Cage limited series drawn by Genndy Tartakovsky in 2016–2017. In 2020, DeStefano won the Outstanding Individual Achievement in Animation Emmy for Character Design on the Genndy Tartakovsky series Primal. In 2024, he contributed art to the Alex Hirsch book The Book of Bill.

== Filmography ==
=== Television ===
Year	Title	Writer	Storyboard artist	Art director	Animator	Notes
1992–96	The Ren and Stimpy Show	Yes	Yes		Yes	background designer, layout artist, layout supervisor, and background assistant
1993	2 Stupid Dogs				Yes	background designer
1994	Beethoven				Yes	character designer
1995	The Baby Huey Show		Yes			ep: "Operation Immunization"
1995	The Twisted Tales of Felix the Cat	Yes				also assistant director
1996	Earthworm Jim		Yes			
1998	Superman: The Animated Series		Yes		Yes	background key designer
1998	The New Batman Adventures		Yes			
1999–2001	What a Cartoon!		Yes		Yes	three episodes; models ("King Crab: Space Crustacean") and prop designer ("Foe Paws")
1999	Courage the Cowardly Dog		Yes			ep: "The Demon in the Mattress"
1999–2000	The New Woody Woodpecker Show		Yes			
2001	Imp, Inc.				Yes	animation layout
2002	Poochini's Yard		Yes			ep: "Diva Dog"
2002	Welcome to Eltingville		Yes			TV short
2002	Private Eye Princess		Yes			TV short
2003	Xiaolin Showdown		Yes			
2004–10	The Venture Bros.		Yes	Yes	Yes	character designer
2006	Minoriteam				Yes	illustrator; ep: "Tribe and Prejudice"
2006	The X's		Yes			ep: "Homebody"
2006	Plastic Man in: Puddle Trouble		Yes		Yes	model designer; TV short
2006	The Grim Adventures of Billy & Mandy	Story	Yes			ep: "Anger Mismanagement"
2006–07	Drawn Together		Yes			
2007–09	Random! Cartoons		Yes			two episodes
2007	The Modifyers				Yes	character designer
2010–11	Sym-Bionic Titan		Yes		Yes	character designer
2011	Batman: The Brave and the Bold	Yes	Yes			ep: "Four-Star Spectacular!"
2012	Ben 10: Ultimate Alien				Yes	character designer; ep: "Catch a Falling Star"
2012	Secret Mountain Fort Awesome	Yes	Yes			ep: "Festro Gets Glasses"
2012	Kick Buttowski: Suburban Daredevil		Yes			two episodes
2012	The Avengers: Earth's Mightiest Heroes		Yes			
2012	Dreamworks Dragons		Yes			two episodes
2012	New Teen Titans		Yes			ep: "Apprentice: Part Three"
2012	The Looney Tunes Show		Yes			
2012–13	Scooby Doo! Mystery Incorporated		Yes			storyboard revisionist
2013	POV		Yes			ep: "Listening Is an Act of Love: A StoryCorps"
2013–18	Mickey Mouse				Yes	character and prop designer
2017	Samurai Jack		Yes		Yes	storyboard layout, storyboard clean-up, and layout keys
2018–19	Rise of the Teenage Mutant Ninja Turtles				Yes	character designer
2019	Primal				Yes	character designer
2020–23	Looney Tunes Cartoons				Yes	character designer
2022	The Cuphead Show!				Yes	character designer
2023	Unicorn: Warriors Eternal				Yes	character designer

==== As voice actor ====
Year	Title	Role(s)
1994	The Ren and Stimpy Show	Chalky Cheesefist
1995	The Twisted Tales of Felix the Cat	Additional voices
2002	Private Eye Princess	Hildegard the Maid
2008	The Venture Bros.	Dr. Paul Entmann

=== Film ===
Year	Title	Storyboard artist	Animator	Notes
1995	Runaway Brain		Yes	Visual development artist
2006	Teen Titans: Trouble in Tokyo	Yes		TV movie
2007	Futurama: Bender's Big Score	Yes		Direct-to-video
2008	Futurama: The Beast with a Billion Backs	Yes		Direct-to-video
2012	Big Top Scooby-Doo!	Yes		Direct-to-video
2015	Hotel Transylvania 2		Yes	character designer
2018	Hotel Transylvania 3: Summer Vacation		Yes	character designer
2022	Hotel Transylvania: Transformania		Yes	character designer
2025	Fixed		Yes	character designer

== Bibliography ==
Apple Comics

- 101 Other Uses for a Condom #1 (1991)

Dark Horse Comics

- Cheval Noir #26, 44 (1992–1993)
- Hellboy, Jr. #1–2 (1999)
- Hellboy, Jr., Halloween Special #1 (1997)
- Instant Piano #1–4 (1994–1995)
- Wolf & Red #2 (1995)

DC Comics

- Action Comics Weekly #637–640 ("Hero Hotline" feature) (1989)
- Billy Batson and the Magic of Shazam! #6 (2009)
- Bizarro Comics #1 (2001)
- Blackhawk vol. 3 #3–4 (1989)
- The Brave and the Bold #200 (one page) (1983)
- Cartoon Cartoons #16, 22–23, 32 (2003–2004)
- Cartoon Network Action Pack #7 (2007)
- Cartoon Network Block Party #3 (2005)
- Cool World #1–4 (movie adaptation) (1992)
- Dexter's Laboratory #11, 30 (2000–2002)
- Elvira's House of Mystery Special #1 (1987)
- Fast Forward #2 (1993)
- The Flash Secret Files and Origins #2 (1999)
- Flintstones and the Jetsons #4 (1997)
- Hero Hotline #1–6 (1989)
- House of Mystery #306, 311, 313–315, 321 (1982–1983)
- Just Imagine Stan Lee... Secret Files and Origins #1 (one page) (2002)
- Legion #9 (2002)
- Looney Tunes #100, 150 (2003–2007)
- Looney Tunes Magazine #6 (1991)
- 'Mazing Man #1–12 (1986)
- 'Mazing Man Special #1–3 (1987–1990)
- New Talent Showcase #6–12 (1984)
- Scooby-Doo #28–29, 45, 77, 79 (1999–2004)
- Secret Origins vol. 2 #16 ('Mazing Man), #30 (Plastic Man), #34 (G'nort) (1987–1988)
- Superman and Batman: World's Funnest #1 (2001)
- Superman Villains Secret Files and Origins #1 (1998)
- Sweatshop #1–3 (2003)
- Wednesday Comics HC (one page) (2010)
- Who's Who in the DC Universe #8 (1991)
- Who's Who in the Legion of Super-Heroes #3 (1988)
- Who's Who: The Definitive Directory of the DC Universe #7, 13, 15–16 (1985–1986)
- Who's Who Update '88 #1 (1988)

Paradox Press

- The Big Book of Bad (1998)
- The Big Book of Little Criminals (1996)
- The Big Book of Scandal (1997)
- The Big Book of Urban Legends (1994)
- The Big Book of Vice (1999)

Disney Comics

- Disney Adventures #97–1, #97–8 (1997)
- Walt Disney's Mickey Mouse Adventures #1–2, 7–11 (1990–1991)

Fantagraphics

- Critters #32, 38, 50 (1989–1990)
- Itchy Planet #3 (one page) (1988)

Harvey Pekar

- American Splendor #14 (1989)

Hyperion Avenue Books

- The Book of Bill (2024)

Marvel Comics

- Bill & Ted's Bogus Journey #1 (movie adaptation) (1991)
- Bill & Ted's Excellent Comic Book #1–3 (1991–1992)
- Cage #1–4 (2016–2017)
- Video Jack #4, 6 (1988)

NBM Publishing

- Classics Desecrated (1995)

Oni Press

- Jingle Belle #1–2 (1999)
- Oni Double Feature #13 (1999)
- Oni Press Summer Vacation Supercolor Fun Special #1 (2000)
- Paul Dini's Jingle Belle Winter Wingding #1 (2002)
- Paul Dini's Jingle Belle's All-Star Holiday Hullabaloo #1 (2000)

Palliard Press

- XXXenophile #6 (1992)

Renegade Press

- Renegade Romance #1–2 (1987–1988)

United Plankton Pictures, Inc.

- SpongeBob Comics #4–5, 34, 43 (2011–2015)
