= The Golden Age (comics) =

1993 limited series published by DC Comics

- Cover to The Golden Age trade paperback

Publication information
- Publisher: DC Comics
- Schedule: Monthly
- Format: Limited series
- Publication date: Summer 1993 – Spring 1994
- No. of issues: 4
- Main character: Various DC Comics Golden Age characters

Creative team
- Written by: James Robinson
- Artist: Paul Smith
- Colorist: Richard Ory

Collected editions
- The Golden Age: ISBN 1-56389-203-0
- JSA: The Golden Age: ISBN 1-4012-0711-1

The Golden Age is a 1993 four-issue Elseworlds comic book miniseries by writer James Robinson and artist Paul Smith. It concerns the Golden Age DC Comics superheroes entering the 1950s and facing the advent of McCarthyism.

== Plot ==
The series opens by showing how various Golden Age heroes have adjusted to life after World War II. The members of the Justice Society of America and All-Star Squadron have mostly retired. Tex Thompson, formerly known as the Americommando and Mr. America, has returned from Europe a war hero and has used his fame to start a political career, resulting in him being elected a senator. He then recruits several former heroes to create a new group of heroes for the 1950s. The group includes Robotman (who is slowly losing touch with his humanity), the Atom and Johnny Thunder (who are both looking for somewhere to belong), and Dan the Dyna-Mite (Daniel Dunbar), who is lost after the death of his mentor TNT. Thompson oversees various experiments on Dunbar which change him into the incredibly powerful Dynaman.

Other retired heroes are suffering from their own problems. The McCarthy hearings have resulted in Green Lantern being blacklisted due to his job as the head of a media corporation. Johnny Quick and Liberty Belle were married and eventually divorced. Quick is now a television reporter while Belle is dating journalist John Law (formerly the Tarantula). Starman has suffered a nervous breakdown after realizing that his research into cosmic energy helped in the development of the atom bomb. Captain Triumph (Lance Gallant) has retired and is trying to lead a normal life, despite his twin brother Michael's ghost urging him to become a hero again. Hourman is fighting his addiction to the Miraclo pill that gives him his powers.

The hero Manhunter (Paul Kirk), who has also returned from Europe, is suffering from memory loss and being hunted by strange men. He meets up with Thompson's former sidekick from his Mr. America days, Bob Daley AKA Fatman, and hides out while coming to terms with his demons. Eventually, the two of them seek the help of Hawkman, who helps Manhunter regain his memories. Those memories reveal a dark secret about Thompson: during the final days of the war, the super-villain known as the Ultra-Humanite, who worked as one of Hitler's scientists at Dachau, transferred his brain into Thompson's body.

While Manhunter is recovering his memories, Thompson's aide and lover Joan Dale, the former Miss America discovers his personal diary. Concerned with Thompson and Dunbar's increasingly strange behavior, she enlists former thief Paula Brooks, also known as the Tigress, to pick the lock and open the diary. The two of them, along with Gallant (whom Brooks was dating), discover not only that Thompson is actually the Ultra-Humanite, but also that he had performed another brain swap, that of Adolf Hitler's brain into Dunbar's body. They call Johnny Quick to inform him about the contents of the diary at about the same time Carter Hall calls him about Manhunter's revelations. This sets the stage for an explosive and tragic final showdown in Washington, D.C.

As Miss America attempts to reveal the truth about Tex Thompson and Dynaman before the assembled heroes, she is murdered by Robotman, who knew but didn't care about Tex and Dynaman's secrets. The Atom is finally convinced by Hourman that Tex and Dynaman are evil. Johnny Thunder, still brainwashed by Thompson's "dream" and blinded by his desire to belong somewhere, orders Yz, his thunderbolt, to kill Hourman. Yz attempts to obey the command but is so torn between his duties to his master and his own moral standards that he suffers a breakdown and flies, screaming, into the heavens (presumably forever) leaving Thunder guilt-ridden. Dynaman admits the truth about himself and proceeds to kill several heroes, including Tarantula, Human Bomb, Sportsmaster (a reformed villain), Doll Man and Red Bee, as well as disabling Doctor Mid-Nite by destroying his goggles and Hawkman by tearing off his wings. Thompson battles Manhunter, who snaps Thompson's neck after both of them fall out of a window. Lance Gallant and Robotman fight and kill each other. Dynaman is killed when Liberty Belle rams what is left of Starman's cosmic rod through his chest. She is able to do this after Dynaman is distracted by Adam Blake AKA Captain Comet, a young hero who joins the others in the fighting.

Despite numerous injuries and deaths, the heroes are triumphant. The last pages show Manhunter recovering and returning to Africa (he disappeared in 1951); Paula returns to a life of crime after being driven over the edge at witnessing Lance's death; Ted Knight recovers and marries; Al Pratt grows more mature after the incident, in contrast to Johnny Thunder who "never changed", and Johnny Quick and Liberty Belle reconcile. Meanwhile, a new generation of superheroes, led by Captain Comet, is born and Quick looks forward to "a new age, as pure as sterling silver". The last page is a splash page showing Captain Comet and various other Silver Age heroes including Martian Manhunter (hovering behind his human identity John Jones), the Challengers of the Unknown, the Doom Patrol, Green Arrow, Elongated Man, Aquaman, Adam Strange, Animal Man, The Creeper, and Metamorpho, as well as successors such as Hal Jordan (Alan Scott's successor as Green Lantern), Ray Palmer (Al Pratt's successor as The Atom), Cliff Steele (Robert Crane's successor as Robotman and a member of the Doom Patrol), and Barry Allen (Jay Garrick's successor as The Flash).

== Continuity ==
The Golden Age takes place outside normal DC Universe continuity and is labeled as an "Elseworlds", but writer James Robinson later incorporated elements of the series into his Starman series. Additionally, some elements of the miniseries were used by writer Geoff Johns in a JSA story arc, bringing some elements of this story into continuity (including Starman helping to develop the atom bomb, the McCarthy hearings blacklisting the JSA — though a variation of this previously appeared in the final issue of the Justice Society's run in Adventure Comics in 1979). The most notable elements that are out of continuity are the fates of Dan the Dyna-Mite (who in DC continuity became a member of "Old Justice", a team that fought Young Justice), Tarantula (who has appeared in the pages of Nightwing), Robotman, who was not destroyed in the 1950s but spent two decades in suspended animation before having his human brain transplanted into the preserved body of his former assistant Chuck Grayson, and Miss America (who appears in the series Freedom Fighters).

== Collected editions ==
The series was collected as a trade paperback (ISBN 1-56389-203-0) in 1995. A new printing of the trade paperback was published in 2005, with the book retitled as JSA: The Golden Age (ISBN 1-4012-0711-1).

== Critical reception and awards ==
Writer Geoff Johns credits James Robinson's work on this book for igniting his love for the characters in it, and for his decision to accept writing duties on JSA in 2000.

Awards

- 1994: Nominated for "Best Finite Series" Eisner Award

== See also ==
- List of Elseworlds publications
