= Mister America (Jeffrey Graves) =

DC Comics superhero

Mr. America
- Mr. America in Justice Society of America (vol. 3) #37 (May 2010).

Publication information
- Publisher: DC Comics
- First appearance: Cameo: Justice Society of America (vol. 3) #1 (February 2007); Full appearance: Justice Society of America (vol. 3) #4 (May 2007)
- Created by: Geoff Johns (writer); Dale Eaglesham (artist)

In-story information
- Alter ego: Jeffrey Graves
- Team affiliations: Justice Society of America; Federal Bureau of Investigation
- Partnerships: All-American Kid
- Abilities: Possesses two explosive whips Maximum physical condition Skilled detective and hand to hand combatant

Mister America (Jeffrey Graves) is a superhero appearing in American comic books published by DC Comics, the official third and current character to take up the Mr. America mantle and a member of the Justice Society of America. Mr. America made his first full appearance as Jeffrey Graves in Justice Society of America (vol. 3) #4 (May 2007), and was created by Geoff Johns and Dale Eaglesham.

Jeffrey bears no relation to the previous heroes, Tex and Trey Thompson, who took the Mr. America mantle. However, he was connected to Trey, as he had formerly worked with him in the FBI. While serving as the second Mr. America, Trey had been murdered. His murderer was later revealed to be Vandal Savage. Jeffrey decided to continue the legacy by becoming the new Mr. America.

== Publication history ==
Jeffrey Graves made his first, non-speaking appearance in the first issue of the third volume of the Justice Society of America series in 2007. In issue #4, he made his first full appearance and then appeared again in issue #11 as the superhero, Mr. America. He appeared in three more issues after this, and then only made occasional appearances.

In 2009, Mr. America began to make more significant appearances in the series, starting with issue #29. Later in the year, Mr. America appeared in Justice Society of America 80-Page Giant #1 and in the six-issue mini-series JSA vs. Kobra.

Later, in 2010, he appeared in Justice Society of America Annual #2 and Blackest Night: JSA #1. He later appeared in issues #45 through #48 in the second volume of the Justice League of America series, due to the Brightest Day tie-in JLA/JSA crossover story.

In 2011, Mr. America appeared in issue #36 of the fourth volume of Outsiders.

== Fictional character biography ==
Jeffrey Graves was a Special Agent who worked for the Federal Bureau of Investigation. His former partner, Trey Thompson was currently working as the superhero Mr. America, who Jeffrey supplied information to about the crimes that went on so Trey could investigate them alongside the FBI. Jeffrey was the only one who knew about Trey's secret identity and he had to pretend to not know Mr. America. However, when Trey's family was murdered, he revealed his identity to the FBI. After discovering and brutally interrogating his family's murderer, a villain named Catalyst, on who had hired him to kill his family, Trey was later murdered. Trey's murderer was revealed to be Vandal Savage, who was killing all of the descendants of early superheroes who had their legacies carried on. Savage was eventually defeated by the Justice Society of America. Jeffrey then lost his job when the FBI discovered he supplied information to Trey, as Trey used to be with the FBI until he took vengeance on a murderer. Jeffrey, while cleaning out his office, took out Mr. America's costume and put his mask on.

=== Joining the Justice Society ===
Later, Jeffrey appeared at a crime scene in the Mr. America costume with two whips, claiming himself to be the new Mr. America. Soon, while investigating more murders by himself, Mr. America was attacked and brutally beaten by Gog. He later stumbled into the Justice Society of America Brownstone, barely breathing. He lived and it was revealed that Gog was murdering metahuman criminals who claimed to be gods. Mr. America was then submitted as a member of the Justice Society. During this moment, Gog appeared and took on the JSA. Mr. America was not seen throughout the rest of the story arc, but Gog was absorbed by the one true Gog, a god who rose on earth. The JSA eventually defeated him.

Mr. America is betrayed by his partner.

Mr. America later recruited his new sidekick, All-American Kid. On the day that Mr. America brought All-American Kid to the Brownstone, most of the team left for battle, leaving All-American Kid, Mr. Terrific and King Chimera as the only ones left at the Brownstone. All-American Kid then went to Mr. Terrific and stabbed him in the back. When the JSA came back and found Mr. Terrific injured, they interrogated All-American Kid. After watching the security tape of All-American Kid resisting, it was concluded that he was mind controlled. When the villains that the JSA previously fought attacked the Brownstone, Mr. America was knocked out by his sidekick. Throughout the rest of the arc, it was revealed that All-American Kid was actually a sociopath named Jeremy Karne. He stabbed Mr. Terrific so he would not figure out who he was and he wanted to infiltrate the Justice Society to kidnap Obsidian.

After Jeremy's infiltration, the Justice Society decided to split into two teams. Mr. America stayed on the regular JSA team. Mr. Terrific, who was alive and was recovering from his injuries, gave Mr. America his whip, saying he made some improvements on it. When Mr. America, along with Lightning at his side, tried his whip out by striking it on some cinder blocks, they exploded, with the impact knocking both of them a few feet back. At the same time, Mr. America soon helped his team defeat Mordru and then later The Fourth Reich, a Nazi team associated with Jeremy.

=== Blackest Night ===
Around the same time during the fight with Mordru, Mr. America helped his team in the fight against the Black Lanterns in New York City. He expressed willpower as he fought against a Black Lantern. Mr. America growled to it, "Come on, you monster". He was later seen defeated and being held by Flash, who sped him to safety at S.T.A.R. Labs.

=== Brightest Day ===
Quickly after defeating The Fourth Reich, Mr. America was then present when Alan Scott had been taken over by the Starheart. The JSA then teamed up with the Justice League and the newly resurrected Jade to stop Alan and other metahumans who had also been corrupted by the Starheart. After a series of events, Batman figured out that Jade was able to drain the Starheart's power by using her powers against Alan enough where he could take back control of the Starheart. This attempt led to success, which gave Alan control back over his powers and setting every other metahuman back to normal.

== Characterization ==
Although not being explored into much more development after his debut, Mr. America has been shown to be a polite, kind-hearted man. He proves to be just as strong and valiant as his teammates when it comes to being a superhero. While having a nice personality, he is serious and vicious when dealing with his enemies. Before joining the Justice Society, he stated he helped the FBI track down a missing girl whose kidnapper viciously brutalized her. Mr. America had made the kidnapper fall down the stairs to the cellar where the kidnapper kept the girl and then fall "back up" the stairs. When it was said that the kidnapper might never walk again, Mr. America said: "Next time I'll make sure".

Mr. America is close friends with his teammate Lightning, as the two often talk and pair up together during battles. When Lightning once called him Mr. Graves, he told her to call him Jeff, as he did not want to feel elderly and reminded her that he was closer in age with her than he is to the veterans of the team. Mr. America is also distasteful against the idea of the military using children, saying it's "ridiculous to let children go into battle".

=== Depiction ===
Unlike Tex and Trey, both who had black hair and mustaches, Jeffrey has brown hair and no mustache. Jeffrey's costume colors are red, white and blue, which symbolizes the American flag. He wears a blue mask, a white shirt with blue cuffs, a red cape with a blue stripe at the bottom of it with white stars running across it, a blue collar with one gold star on each side, blue pants, blue boot shin guards and a brown belt. His costume is almost identical to the one Tex and Trey wore, except with a few minor changes. The original Mr. America costume consisted of a red belt, white collar, one blue star on each side of the collar, blue gloves, no cuffs on the shirt, and white shin guards. Jeffrey's costume has a brown belt, blue collar, one gold star on each side of the collar, no gloves, blue cuffs on his shirt, and blue shin guards.

== Powers and abilities ==
Mr. America makes a crate explode with his whips.

Mr. America is one of the few people on his team who doesn't have any superhuman powers or abilities. He is a skilled detective and is skilled at hand-to-hand combat as he is a former Special Agent and he had worked for the FBI. He is also in maximum physical condition for a regular person. While Tex and Trey had only used one whip as their weapon, Jeffrey uses two whips. He used two regular whips as his weapons until Mr. Terrific upgraded them, making them explode whatever they strike. It was never revealed how Mr. Terrific managed to do this, as all he said to Jeffrey was that he had "tinkered" with the whip and had "made a few improvements" on it.

Mr. Terrific also never clearly stated why he made the improvements to the whips but it can be assumed that he did it to simply make the whips more effective during battles and help Mr. America become more of a threat to super powered enemies, as he is a non-powered human and his two regular whips had proved to be ineffective many times, thus causing him many injuries. At the time when he was beaten by Gog and still using his regular whips, Mr. America said: "I tried to stop him. Guess what? Power staff beats whip".
