= Tex Thompson =

DC Comics superhero

- Tex Thompson (far left) as Mr. America, the Americommando, in Action Comics #52.

Publication information
- Publisher: DC Comics
- First appearance: Action Comics #1 (June 1938)
- Created by: Ken Fitch; Bernard Baily

In-story information
- Alter ego: Harry "Tex" Thompson (originally Thomson)
- Team affiliations: All-Star Squadron; OSS; Hero Hotline
- Notable aliases: Mr. America, Americommando, The Coordinator
- Abilities: Detective skills Espionage training Expert marksman Skilled with explosives Expert with whip Cape capable of flight Expert hand-to-hand combat Martial artist

Harry "Tex" Thompson (Thomson pre-1993) is a superhero owned by DC Comics who later became the masked crime-fighter Mr. America and then became an espionage operative called Americommando. He was often aided by his best friend Bob Daley, who for a brief time operated as his costumed sidekick "Fatman". Created by Ken Fitch and Bernard Baily, Tex debuted in Action Comics #1 (June 1938), the same comic that introduced Superman. During his original stories of the 1940s, several of his enemies were based on Yellow Peril stereotypes. Several of his earliest stories featured Gargantua T. Potts, a character based around minstrel show stereotypes about African-Americans.

The "Tex Thomson" series in Action Comics featured Tex and his friend Bob Daley investigating various crimes and mysteries, sometimes alongside law enforcement. When Tex took on the identity Mr. America, he used a whip as his weapon of choice. Later on, he used a scientific experiment to endow his cape with the power of flight. When he joined the Office of Strategic Services as the Americommando, he became a trained spy and field operative, gaining skills in combat, weapons, explosives, and military vehicles.

The 1993 DC Comics mini-series The Golden Age featured Tex. The story's writer James Robinson misspelled his last name as "Thompson". All later comics followed this spelling.

The 1999 comic The Justice Society Returns: National Comics #1 heavily implies Americommando died in 1945 in Dresden, Germany, during its bombing by Allied forces.

== Publishing history ==
Originally introduced as an independently wealthy adventurer named "Tex" Thomson, the hero regularly used a gift for detective skills to solve crimes he heard about or came across. He also explored hidden societies and fought spies and terrorists who threatened America. Starting with his second story, Tex was often seen in the company of his overweight, good-natured friend Bob Daley. Another frequent ally during his earliest adventures was Gargantua T. Potts, a black character designed around racist stereotypes. Gargantua had exaggerated features, spoke in broken English, and was simple-minded and highly emotional. He acted as a servant of Tex Thomson, whom he called "Mr. Tex".

In Action Comics #26 (1940), readers were told Gargantua had left Tex's company to pursue his own fate. The same issue had Tex receive a warning to stay away from "Maloney". Tex later met and befriended District Attorney Maloney, becoming the DA's special investigator. The same story also introduced the mysterious Miss X, who didn't wear a costume or mask but hid her identity with the aid of a fedora and dark glasses. Later on, Tex met Maloney's daughter, first called Janice then later called Peggy (later comics corrected this by saying her full name was Margaret Janice Maloney, and that she called herself "Peggy" as is common with some people named Margaret). The stories strongly implied Peggy was Miss X and Tex himself came to this conclusion, but it was never confirmed in-story. Maloney and Miss X dropped out of Tex's stories during 1941.

To take advantage of the rising popularity of superheroes, Action Comics #33 (1941) rebranded Tex as a masked hero called Mr. America, armed him with a whip. The initial idea was that Tex was believed dead and left his identity behind to now act exclusively as Mr. America, similar to the earlier heroes the Lone Ranger and the Spirit, but this idea was dropped after a few months and Tex resumed a civilian identity under his real name. In Action Comics #42, his friend Bob Daley became "Fatman", a costumed sidekick who mainly provided comic relief or acted as someone Mr. America would need to frequently save. The same issue featured Mr. America endow his cape with the power of flight (similar to a magic flying carpet) thanks to special chemical treatments and a remote control built into his sash. In several stories, Mr. America fights spies and operatives of the Axis Powers. Many of these enemies, particularly those who are meant to be Japanese, are designed around cultural stereotypes and Yellow Peril ideas.

In Action Comics #52 (1942), Mr. America and Fatman are referred to as "Americommandos". In the next issue, this nickname only applies to Mr. America. It is not treated as a new codename, but rather as a nickname, in the same way that Superman is called the "Man of Steel" or "Man of Tomorrow" and Batman is called "the Dark Knight" or "Darknight Detective". In Action Comics #54 (1942), President Franklin Delano Roosevelt is depicted in the comic and asks Tex to operate as a spy and special operative for the Allies in the European theatre. In this story, Tex remarks that the training he'll receive before taking this assignment will make him an "Americommando" and FDR agrees that this is a perfect designation for him: "Mr. America, Americommando!"

For the rest of his Golden Age adventures, Tex infiltrates and disrupts various Axis Powers operations, sometimes in costume and sometimes while wearing civilian clothing or disguised as a Nazi, at one point establishing the identity of Hauptmann Riker. In Action Comics #56, this identity was exposed by his new enemy Dr. Ito, a half-German/half-Japanese mastermind known also as "the Little One", described by the story's narrator as "mystery man of two worlds, in whose blood the treachery of Japan and the savagery of Prussia have curdled to form a fearsome brew of terror". As the Golden Age ended, Tex's stories were cancelled and he was not revived for Silver Age stories during the 1950s and 1960s.

According to Jess Nevins' Encyclopedia of Golden Age Superheroes, Tex Thompson "explores lost cities, fights ape armies, woos the Queen of the Malays, has a recurring nemesis in the person of the cyclopean Yellow Peril Gorrah, fights zombies, island demons, spies, the half-German, half-Japanese dwarf 'master of assassination' Dr. Ito, and the female crime lord Queen Bee, and he kills lots of Germans and Japanese during the war".

In the series All-Star Squadron (1981-1987), writer Roy Thomas retroactively made it official DC canon that during World War II the company's Golden Age heroes (as well as new characters and Golden Age heroes from other companies DC later acquired) were drafted under "Article X" to serve together in a special war-time organization. The series revealed Mr. America served with this organization, the All-Star Squadron, while he still operated in the US. This allowed DC Comics to retroactively establish several meetings and team-ups between Tex and other DC heroes. Tex is first seen with the Squadron in All-Star Squadron #31, when he arrives with many other heroes for the group's first full roster general meeting at the site of the New York World's Fair. He only makes brief cameos during this issue and a few later ones. In issue #27 of the spin-off series Young All-Stars, it is said Tex's special training to become Americommando involved becoming an expert in different martial arts, such as jujutsu. The same issue features Tex bidding goodbye to several Squadron colleagues before leaving for Europe, indicating he formed genuine friendships with several of them in off-panel scenes.

In an Action Comics storyline in 1989, the Hero Hotline was introduced as a commercial service operating in the modern-day. This service was managed by a mysterious character called "Coordinator" who supplied "substitute heroes" for those who called the hotline. This was followed by the 6-issue 1989 series Hero Hotline. Writer Bob Rozakis later revealed he intended the Coordinator to be Tex Thomson, still alive decades after World War II, but this was never confirmed in-story.

Still considered a relatively obscure character, Tex gained great attention in 1993 in the popular mini-series The Golden Age which features an alternate history of how DC's Golden Age era heroes experienced the years following the end of World War II. Tex is a major character in the story, praised as a hero who killed Hitler but eventually revealed to be one of the secret villains of the mini-series. In this story, writer James Robinson spelled his name as "Thompson" instead of "Thomson". Robinson is known for occasionally misspelling or altering certain character names in his stories (for example, in his 1990s Starman series, Robinson had instances where he referred to superhero Jay Garrick as Jay Garrett and Dinah Lance as Diana Lance). As most modern storytellers knew about Tex primarily from The Golden Age mini-series rather than from his original, obscure stories, the new spelling became the norm in all subsequent DC Comics stories.

In 1999, DC Comics published an event The Justice Society Returns, involving several one-shot issues featuring at least two Golden Age era heroes joining forces. This event publicized the upcoming new series JSA which would feature modern-day stories with characters who either operated during the Golden Age or carried on the legacy of Golden Age heroes. One chapter of this event, the one-shot The Justice Society Returns: National Comics #1, had the original Mister Terrific (Terry Sloane) journey to Dresden, Germany alongside the original Flash (Jay Garrick). Mr. Terrific encounters a Gestapo whom he realizes is actually the Americommando. The same story implies the Americommando dies during the bombing of Dresden, in which case he was not the Coordinator of Hero Hotline decades later (or he was but then his history was changed by the reality reboot that occurred in 1994's Zero Hour: Crisis in Time).

The third volume of the series Justice Society of America (2007-2011) showed two legacy characters taking up the mantle of Mr. America. The first was Trey Thompson, whom the character Dr. Mid-Nite referred to as the "last of the Thompson bloodline". The next was Jeffrey Graves, who joined the modern-day incarnation of the JSA.

== Fictional character biography ==
Thompson is originally a blond-haired young man from Texas who leaves behind the possibility of becoming an oil baron to pursue a more adventurous lifestyle with his friend, Bob Daley. The two enjoy many adventures in Texas as well as hidden cities and mysterious regions. They also have several encounters with criminals and con-artists. They also work with Gargantua T. Potts. After Gargantua leaves to pursue his own life and agenda, Tex establishes a friendship with District Attorney Maloney and accepts a job as the man's special investigator, tasked with helping crack down on organized crime. The same day, he meets the mysterious Miss X, who helps him on other adventures. After meeting Maloney's daughter Margaret Janice "Peggy" Maloney, Tex concludes she might be Miss X herself.

=== Mr. America ===
In 1941, Thompson resigns his duties as an investigator and accepts a special war relief. He leaves aboard the Angelus, a ship carrying food supplies to Europe. Tex discovers a Nazi saboteur on board but is too late to prevent the man from planting an explosive. The explosion causes the ship to sink but Thompson survives and makes it to safety. Returning to America, he takes advantage of the public believing him to be dead and operates clandestinely, tracking down the bomber and his leader Pratt, who manages an entire sabotage crime. Donning a mask and patriotic costume, dyeing his hair black, and arming himself with a bull whip, Tex calls himself "Mr. America" and brings Pratt to justice. After a few more adventures, Tex decides to resume his civilian life, once again joining forces with Bob Daley.

Months after beginning his costumed career, Mr. America uses experimental chemicals to give his cape the power of flight. At the same time, Bob Daley decides to a costumed hero to complement Mr. America and act as his official sidekick. Like the original Red Tornado, Daley creates a disguise out of homemade items (such as a lampshade he uses as a mask). Wielding a broom as his weapon, Daley calls himself "Fatman" and joins Mr. America on several adventures. Despite Fatman's bumbling behavior and sometimes ridiculous antics, Mr. America appreciates his help and loyalty. A recurring adversary for the duo during this time is the woman crime lord known as the Queen Bee.

When the US official enters World War II, President Franklin D. Roosevelt creates "Article X", drafting America's superheroes to unify as a special war-time organization called the All-Star Squadron. Mr. America answers the draft, working with the Squadron on a few occasions and meeting several other masked heroes of the time. He formed friendships with some of his All-Star Squadron colleagues, such as Johnny Quick, Firebrand, Tarantula, and the organization's chairperson Liberty Belle.

=== Americommando ===
In 1942, President Roosevelt summons Mr. America, whom he is aware is really Harry "Tex" Thompson. Impressed with the man's work against spies and organized crime in America, FDR requests Tex undergo intensive military and combat training so he can then operate overseas for the OSS as the "Americommando". Thompson agrees, saying goodbye to Bob Daley who is not authorized to join him. After his training, Thompson arrives in the European Theatre and helps the Allies defeat several operations of the Axis Powers. Americommando stays behind enemy lines for the rest of World War II. During these adventures, he didn't use his flying cape. Over time, Tex came to realize that while he had cause to hate the Nazi party, many Germans were good people and victims of their own country's government.

In time, Thompson adopts the identity of "Hauptmann Riker" and infiltrates the Gestapo. In 1945, he is stationed in Dresden when he meets the original American hero called Mr. Terrific (Terry Sloane). The allies are bombing the city and Terrific has been told this is due to the presence of munitions factories. Thompson informs Terrific that Dresden has no munitions factories and this fact is known to the Allies. As the bombing continues, Thompson enters a burning building to save a German civilian. As soon as he does, a bomb hits the building, destroying it instantly and knocking Mr. Terrific backward. The Americommando is never seen again.

=== Hero Hotline ===
In the modern era, a mysterious figure known as the Coordinator established the Hero Hotline organization. A commercial enterprise, Hero Hotline provided "substitute heroes" for those who called with emergencies or special situations where help was needed. The Coordinator's identity was never revealed in-story, but writer Bob Rozakis later said he intended the Coordinator to be Tex Thompson, still alive and semi-active decades after World War II.

=== Legacy Heroes ===
In the modern era, an ex-FBI agent named Trey Thompson, implied to be related to Tex Thompson, decides to become a vigilante and dons the Mr. America identity. He is quickly killed in the field, but his former FBI contact Jeffrey Graves later assumes the Mr. America mantle. Graves uses a whip that is later modified by the second Mr. Terrific, who equips it with an explosive tip.

== Powers and abilities ==
When first introduced, Tex Thompson is an intelligent person with a talent for detective work and great skill at hand-to-hand combatant. He becomes formidable with a whip, his weapon of choice as Mr. America. For some of his adventures as Mr. America, he also employed a chemically treated cape capable of going rigid and achieving flight, comparing it to a flying rug from legend. To control the cape's functions, Mr. America used a remote control built into his sash and pressed certain buttons when needed.

As an official US government operative called Americommando, Tex receives intensive military training, learning espionage techniques, as well as how to operate certain military vehicles and explosives. Americommando's government training makes him a proficient marksman in various firearms and an expert in different martial arts, including jujutsu. He also learns German and is able to speak it fluently while disguising his native accent from most people (only Mr. Terrific's special skills were able to detect the presence of an American dialect).

== Other versions ==
Tex Thompson played a central role in the Golden Age miniseries, which takes place outside DC canon and offered an alternative history of the fates of DC's Golden Age heroes following World War II. He is still a crime-fighter who leaves for Europe in 1942 to fight the Nazi threat from within. In this version of events, he kills the German metahuman Parsifal, who has the ability to disable the powers of other metahumans. He meets his end when, captured by the enemy, his brain is removed and replaced by that of the Ultra-Humanite. At the end of the war, the Ultra-Humanite/Thompson is credited with killing Adolf Hitler himself and returns to America as a hero. He becomes a senator and has aspirations to be President of the United States before being revealed as a villain.
