= 'Mazing Man =

- Cover to 'Mazing Man #1.

Publication information
- Publisher: DC Comics
- First appearance: 'Mazing Man #1 (January 1986)
- Created by: Bob Rozakis (script); Stephen DeStefano (art)

In-story information
- Alter ego: Sigfried Horatio Hunch III
- Team affiliations: Justice League of Anarchy

'Mazing Man is the title character of a comic book series created by Bob Rozakis and Stephen DeStefano and published by DC Comics. The series ran for twelve issues in 1986, with additional special issues in 1987, 1988, and 1990. Additionally, a 'Mazing Man origin story was featured in Secret Origins #16, and an original one-page story that appeared as an ad in Comics Buyer's Guide.

== Series overview ==
'Mazing Man depicts the misadventures of Sigfried Horatio Hunch III, a civilian from Queens who dresses in a homemade costume and performs local good deeds. Viewed as a harmless kook by his neighbors, he saves a child from being hit by a truck in the first issue, earning him some respect and attention. Hunch also happens to be a millionaire after winning a magazine subscription company's sweepstakes, but he does not flaunt his wealth or live an opulent lifestyle.

The series also has a backup feature, "Zoot Sputnik", drawn by Fred Hembeck, that serves as a parody of Golden Age comics.

In Ambush Bug: Year None, 'Mazing Man is revealed to be on death row.

== Reception ==
The original series was acclaimed, but short-lived. Comics artist Frank Miller contributed a cover for issue #12, the final issue of the monthly series, with the lead characters of The Dark Knight Returns. This created enough interest for three irregularly-issued 'Mazing Man Special comics.

== Other characters ==
Denton Fixx
'Maze's best friend and writer for BC Comics. Although human, he resembles a dog.
Brenda Valentine
A rising star at a local advertising agency. She is married to Eddie Valentine.
Eddie Valentine
The assistant manager of the South Richmond Bank. Eddie is married to Brenda. He plays baseball recreationally and is a Gold Glove winner at John Quincy High School.
K.P. Watson
Denton's half-sister.
Guido Garibaldi
A jock simpleton who lives in the same building as Denton, 'Maze, Eddie, and Brenda. He works in three shoe stores and spends most of his time wondering which one he's called in sick at, drinking beer and hopelessly pursuing women.
Sgt. Muldavey
A local police officer who is plagued by 'Maze's "heroics".
Mrs. Costinas
The landlady of Maze, Denton, and K.P., Costinas. She is most often seen sweeping the front steps of their building. She never smiles and usually grunts at passersby.
Helenita Trialdo
A baby whose appearances revolve around her lack of hair.
Senora Tiraldo
Helenita's mother.
Walter Vanderplatz
Eddie's supervisor at the South Richmond Bank. He is more than a bit of a stuffed shirt.

== In other media ==
'Mazing Man appears in the Batman: The Brave and the Bold episode "Four Star Spectacular!", voiced by Tom Kenny. This version idolizes Batman and derives his costume from his.

== See also ==
- List of DC Comics publications
