= Bob Rozakis =

American comic book writer and editor

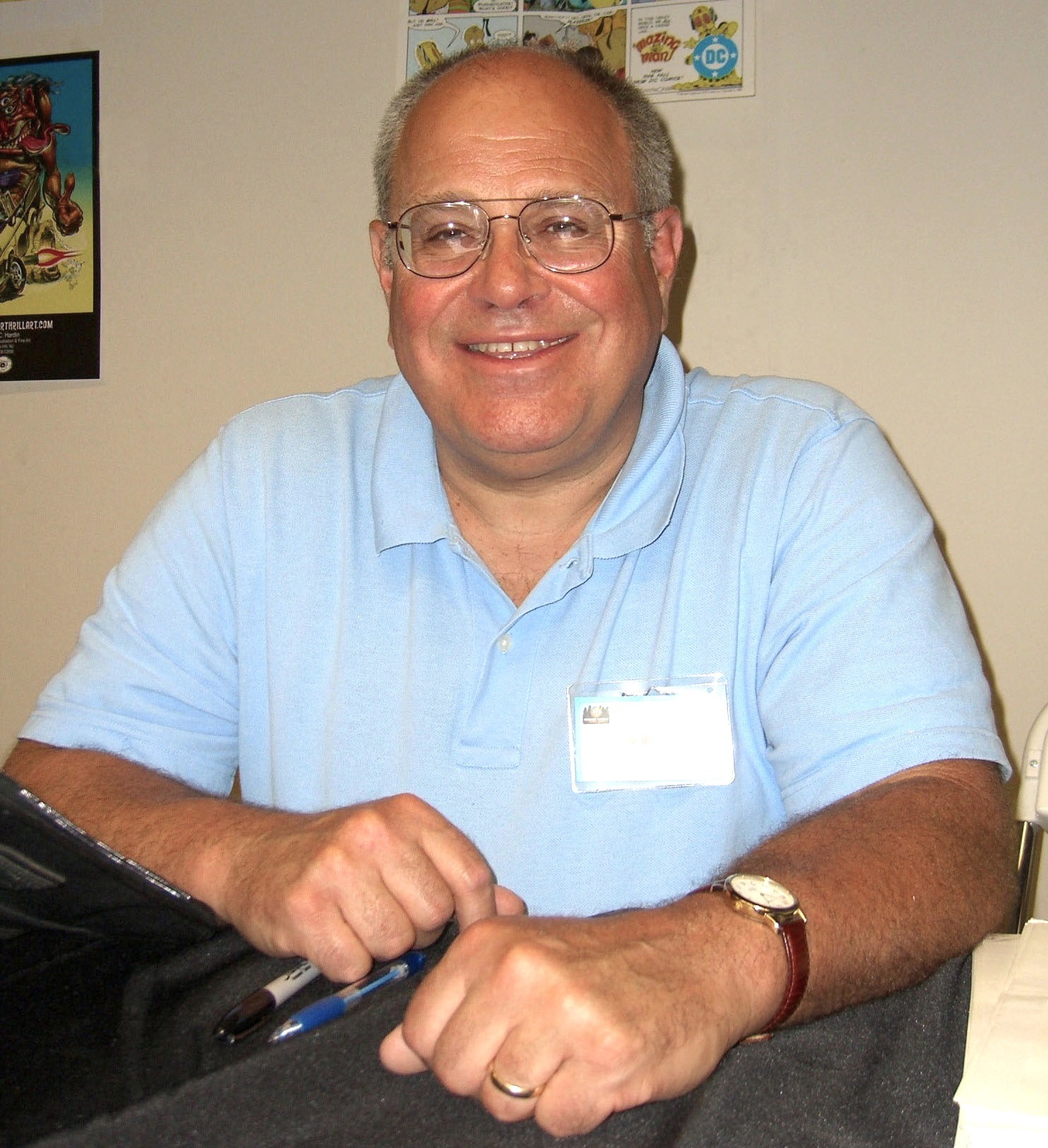
- Rozakis at the Big Apple Convention, May 21, 2011
- Born: Robert H. Rozakis; April 4, 1951 (age 75)
- Areas: Writer, Editor
- Pseudonyms: The Answer Man; Boris Zabok; Ted P. Skimmer
- Notable works: 'Mazing Man
- Spouse: Laurie Rozakis
- Children: Charles Rozakis and Samantha Rozakis

Robert "Bob" Rozakis (/rəˈzækɪs/; born April 4, 1951) is an American comic book writer and editor known mainly for his work in the 1970s and 1980s at DC Comics, as the writer of 'Mazing Man and in his capacity as DC's "Answer Man".

== Career ==
Bob Rozakis got his start in the comics industry through his many letters to comic book letter columns. Among his earliest credits is that of editor on DC Comics "Pro-zine" ("Professional fanzine") The Amazing World of DC Comics between 1974 and 1978. In addition to editing, Rozakis wrote for the bi-monthly publication and oversaw the letters page.

He is known as DC's "Answer Man", answering trivia questions from readers in the Daily Planet promotional page in many late–1970s comics and he has had an online presence in that capacity since the mid-1990s. Other pen names used by Rozakis are Boris Zabok and Ted P. Skimmer.

=== DC Production Department ===
Between 1981 and 1998, Rozakis ran DC Comics' production department, and as Executive Director of Production, he was instrumental in the development of offset-printed comic books in a wide variety of formats. He was the leading proponent of "computerized color separations and typesetting, electronic page preparation, and computer-to-plate printing", and as a result of his efforts on DC's behalf, the look of comic books across the entire industry changed, DC won "over one hundred awards for printing excellence", and Rozakis himself was profiled in Publishing & Production Executive on two separate occasions. In 2003, Rozakis announced his retirement from the comic book industry.

== Comics credits ==
His first comics credit was in Detective Comics #445 (March 1975), as writer of the back-up feature "The Touchdown Trap", with back-up stories in Action Comics, The Flash and Batman Family soon following. He was assistant editor to Julius Schwartz on issues of Action Comics, Detective Comics, and Superman. His writing credits consist largely of back-up features, especially for Action Comics featuring Air-Wave, Aquaman, and the Atom. Rozakis stated in a 2014 interview that "I don't recall how we ended up with the three of them. It may have simply been that all three had names that began with 'A' and it was a backup in Action Comics".

His credits during his 25-year career with DC total "almost four hundred stories" featuring most DC characters, "plus dozens of features, puzzles, and activities pages".

In 1976, Rozakis and Paul Levitz co-wrote a revival of the Teen Titans. Among his characters he created during this time are Duela Dent; the Bumblebee; and the Calculator. He revived Batwoman and the original Bat-Girl. Rozakis and artist Juan Ortiz crafted an origin for the Teen Titans in issue #53 of the series.

He was the writer for Secret Society of Super Villains when it was cancelled as part of the DC Implosion. Issue 15 was the last published, but the unpublished issues 16 and 17 appeared in Cancelled Comics Cavalcade, and later in a hardcover collected edition published in 2012.

He and artist Dan Spiegle created the character Mister E in Secrets of Haunted House #31 (Dec. 1980). Rozakis wrote seven stories for the "Whatever Happened to...?" backup feature in DC Comics Presents in 1980 and 1981 and the Superman: The Secret Years miniseries in 1985. He scripted the comics adaptations of such movies as Rainbow Brite and the Star Stealer (1985), Superman IV: The Quest for Peace (1987), and Bill & Ted's Excellent Adventure (1989). He was the writer of the syndicated comic strip The Superman Sunday Special for two years.

His most well-known writing came in the twelve-issue 1986 series 'Mazing Man, featuring the misadventures of self-declared homemade hero Sigfried Horatio Hunch III, which Rozakis co-created with artist Stephen DeStefano. The two returned to the character for three specials and for Secret Origins #16 (July 1987), to tell "The Closest Thing To A Secret Origin of 'Mazing Man You Will Ever Get". Rozakis co-created the series Hero Hotline with DeStefano, on which Rozakis provided the coloring.

Rozakis' comic book work in 1998–2000 was a variety of custom publications including the "Celebrate the Century" comic books for the United States Postal Service, as well as publications for Con Edison, the San Francisco Giants and the United Nations Land Mine Awareness program. In 2008, he began writing a series of "alternate reality" articles titled "The Secret History of All-American Comics Inc." for Alter Ego and Back Issue! magazines.

== Personal life ==
Rozakis is married to author Laurie E. Rozakis, a professor of English, grammar expert and "author of more than 100 books", and Bob Rozakis' co-writer on Detective Comics #464 (Oct. 1976). The two have collaborated on The Complete Idiot's Guide to Office Politics. They have two children: son Charles "Chuck", who wrote his Princeton University thesis on the business viability of webcomics, and daughter Samantha "Sammi". In 1973, Laurie and Bob drove the DC Comicmobile, a van which sold comic books "like the ice cream man did".

Preceded by Bob Haney (in 1973)	Teen Titans writer 1976–1978	Succeeded by Marv Wolfman (in 1980)
